= Cork–Wexford hurling rivalry =

Cork-Wexford
- Location: County Cork; County Wexford
- Teams: Cork; Wexford
- First meeting: Wexford 1-6 - 2-2 Cork; 1890 All-Ireland final (16 November 1890)
- Latest meeting: Wexford 0-23 - 1-17 Cork; All-Ireland qualifier (9 July 2016)
- Next meeting: TBA

Statistics
- Total meetings: 12
- Top scorer: Charlie McCarthy (2-17)
- All-time series: Championship: Cork 10-2 Wexford (1 draw)
- Largest victory: Cork 1-27 - 0-12 Wexford; 2004 All-Ireland semi-final (15 August 2004)

The Cork-Wexford rivalry is a hurling rivalry between Irish county teams Cork and Wexford, who first played each other in 1890. The fixture has been an irregular one due to both teams playing in separate provinces. Cork's home ground is Páirc Uí Chaoimh and Wexford's home ground is Innovate Wexford Park, however, most of their championship meetings have been held at neutral venues, usually Croke Park.

While Cork are regarded as one of the "big three" of hurling, with Kilkenny and Tipperary completing the trio, Wexford are ranked joint fifth in the all-time roll of honour and have enjoyed sporadic periods of dominance at various stages throughout the history of the championship. The two teams have won a combined total of 36 All-Ireland Senior Hurling Championship titles.

As of 2015 Cork and Wexford have met twelve times in the hurling championship including meeting six times at the All Ireland final stage where Cork hold the upper hand with five victories to Wexford's sole triumph.

== History ==
=== 1954-1956: the friendly rivalry ===
...the warmth between the counties may have been
partly produced by the enjoyment Cork took from
meeting a new team. After the endless and often
personal wars of attrition against Tipperary and
Kilkenny, meeting the purple and gold jerseys of
Wexford must have been a liberating experience.

— Jim English describes the respect behind Cork
and Wexford's fifties rivalry.

On 5 September 1954 a record crowd of 84,856 packed Croke Park to see the first championship clash of Cork and Wexford in over half a century. Cork scored the opening point after just two minutes, while Christy Ring kept the scoreboard ticking over with some fine points. A palmed goal by Tom Ryan and a series of points from Nicky Rackard had Wexford ahead by 1-3 to 0-5 at the interval. With a strong breeze in their favour in the second half, Cork looked in a very strong position. Nicky Rackard had switched from full-forward to centre -forward to curb the long clearances of Vincy Twomey. By the tenth minute points from Tim Flood and Paddy Kehoe had Wexford 1-6 to 0-5 ahead. Ring and Twomey points cut the deficit to two and with four minutes left young Johnny Clifford trapped the ball on the end line, dribbled it along the ground and shot past Art Foley from a narrow angle. Injury-time points gave Cork a 1-9 to 1-6 victory and a third successive All-Ireland crown.

Two years later on 23 September 1956, Cork and Wexford, the two All-Ireland champions of the previous two years, faced each other in the decider once again. Wexford got off to a great start and had a 1-1 to no score lead after just three minutes courtesy of Tim Flood and Padge Kehoe. Cork regrouped but still trailed by 1-6 to 0-5 at the interval. Wexford stretched their lead to seven points in the second half before a Christy Ring goal from a free, followed shortly by a point, had Cork back in the game and trailing by three. Paddy Barry got Cork's second goal while a Ring point gave the Rebels a one-point lead. Wexford then scored three points on the spin. In the dying moments of the game and Wexford holding onto that two-point lead, the sliotar broke to Christy Ring and he headed straight for goal with the Wexford back line in pursuit. When he got to the 21-yard line he let off a shot that was set to rattle the back of the net, but the shot was somehow blocked by goalkeeper Art Foley and then cleared. Within a minute the sliotar dropped into Foley again and after it was cleared it made its way up the pitch and was buried in the back of the Cork net by Nicky Rackard giving Wexford a 2-14 to 2-8 victory. In spite of Cork's defeat, Wexford's Nick O'Donnell and Bobby Rackard, in an unparalleled display of sportsmanship in any game, raised Cork's Christy Ring onto their shoulders and carried him off the field. Wexford had won the game but there was no doubt in their minds that the real hero was Ring.

=== 1970-1977: Cork dominate in All-Ireland finals ===
On 6 September 1970 Cork and Wexford faced each other in the first 80-minute All-Ireland final. Wexford took the lead in the fifth minute when a goal resulted from a melee of confusion in the parallelogram. Wexford's lead only lasted five minutes as Cork powered on when Eddie O'Brien flicked the sliotar overhead to the net for Cork's first goal in the eleventh minute. He got his second in the 34th minute when he deflected a Willie Walsh shot to the net. O'Brien completed his hat-trick in the 33rd minute of the second half when he soloed through the Wexford defence before fisting home another goal for Cork. Wexford's hopes of a comeback came to nothing as Cork powered to a 6-20 to 5-11 victory.

After emerging from their respective provinces, Cork and Wexford faced each other in the All-Ireland decider again on 5 September 1976. Cork got off to one of the worst ever starts in a decider, when two goals from Martin Quigley left them trailing by 2-2 to no score after just six minutes. Cork fought back through the brilliance of Pat Moylan's long-range free-taking, while a Ray Cummins goal brought the sides level at the interval. Wexford started brighter with a Tony Doran goal restoring their lead once again, however, Cork went looking for their own goal. An opportunistic first-time pull by Charlie McCarthy found its way to the net and gave Cork a one-point lead. Cork 'keeper Martin Coleman brought off some marvelous saves to deny the Wexford forwards on a number of occasions and to secure a 2-21 to 4-11 victory for Cork.

The second successive meeting of Cork and Wexford in the All-Ireland decider on 4 September 1977 failed to live up to the expectations of the previous year. Cork's preparations were hampered during a pre-match warm-up in front of Hill 16 when Seánie O'Leary got hit in the face with a sliotar, suffering a broken nose. He missed the parade before the game due to his injury but played for the full seventy minutes, being described throughout the game by RTÉ commentator Michael O'Hehir as "the man who nearly didn't play." In spite of this injury O'Leary scored the decisive goal for Cork as the game entered the last quarter. Goalkeeper Martin Coleman came to the rescue for Cork once again when Wexford rallied. Christy Keogh sent a thundering shot at goal and it looked like the certain equaliser, only for Coleman to reach for it and leave those in attendance confident they had witnessed one of the greatest saves in an All-Ireland final. A 1–17 to 3–8 victory gave Cork their second title as part of a famous three-in-a-row.

=== 2003-2004: All-Ireland semi-final clashes ===
After a 26-year absence, Cork and Wexford renewed their rivalry in the All-Ireland semi-final on 10 August 2003. Played in brilliant sunshine, the match opened at a blistering place, with Joe Deane pucking over the first score before a Paul Codd goal for Wexford in the sixth minute. The frenetic opening pace began to slow half way through the first half but the quality of Wexford's play did not dip at all and the Model County led by 1-11 to 0-10 at the interval. Wexford stretched the lead to six points early on, however, Cork began to fight back with a goal from Setanta Ó hAilpín helping their cause. On 56 minutes Deane got his eighth score when, after a scramble in the Wexford square, he found space to knock in Cork’s second goal. Wexford looked in trouble but their nerve held and goalkeeper Damien Fitzhenry drove straight down the other end. Larry Murphy collected and passed to Mitch Jordan, who drove it straight to the back of the net to leave the score 2-17 to 2-15. Both sides traded points but, with less than two minutes to go, Cork notched unanswered points and looked the likely victors, however, Fitzhenry's puck-out after Alan Browne's point went the length of the pitch and fell to Rory McCarthy who drilled it to the back of the net to level the match at 3-17 to 2-20 with the very last puck of the game in the most dramatic manner possible.

The replay a week later on 16 August 2003 showed early signs that it may live up to the frenetic pace of the drawn encounter. After John Gardner and Niall McCarthy had given Cork an early two point lead, Wexford's Mitch Jordan pounced on some uncertainty in the Cork defence and cheekily flicked the sliotar past Donal Óg Cusack in the Cork net for the opening goal of the game. A long puck out from Damien Fitzhenry was met by more shaky Cork defending, and as the ball broke loose about 20 yards out, it was hit first time by Larry Murphy whose shot was too hard for Cusack to stop. Unfazed, Cork stuck to their game plan and were back in the game when Alan Browne struck low, through a forest of legs, and across the goal past Fitzhenry. The goal count was brought level soon afterwards when Timmy McCarthy latched onto an Alan Browne hand pass. Wexford trailed by 2-8 to 2-3 at the interval, however, as Diarmuid O'Sullivan and Seán Óg Ó hAilpín shored up the defence, Cork went on to win the second half by 1-9 to 0-4.

For the third time in two seasons, Cork and Wexford faced off in an All-Ireland semi-final on 15 August 2004. This time it was a similar story as Wexford were no match for the firepower of Cork's forward line. Ben and Jerry O'Connor were in sparkling form as between them the brothers contributed 14 points. Tom Kenny scored a spectacular goal in the 29th minute which signalled the end of Wexford's challenge as they went into the interval trailing 1-13 to 0-4. Cork continued to fire over points from all angles at ease as they booked their place in the decider against Kilkenny for the second year running.

=== 2012-2015: All-Ireland qualifier meetings ===
On 14 July 2012 Cork and Wexford faced off in a do-or-die qualifier meeting at Semple Stadium. The game started with a welter of goals, Luke O'Farrell’s early effort for Cork was immediately matched by Diarmuid Lyng, but O’Farrell continued to impress, scoring his second goal before earning a penalty that was emphatically despatched by goalkeeper Anthony Nash. Still Wexford continued to pose a threat through Rory Jacob and Lyng landed a couple of sideline cuts – one of which was scarcely credible – to cut the half-time deficit to 3-7 to 1-11. Cork had the breeze on the resumption though and gradually took control of the game, and with Patrick Horgan and Niall McCarthy in form they pulled away. Garrett Sinnott pulled a goal back for Wexford but the score – along with the late dismissal of Wexford’s David Redmond – had little influence on the game which Cork won by 3-24 to 2-17.

Three years later on 4 July 2015, Cork and Wexford met in yet another do-or-die qualifier. The Rebels dominated the opening exchanges and had three points on the scoreboard before Wexford’s Ian Byrne landed a free on four minutes to get the home side off the mark. Goals by Conor Lehane and Séamus Harnedy helped Cork to a fourteen-point half-time lead. The Model County landed the next eight scores in a row to pull the deficit back to six points. Cork only managed five points in the second half, however, it was Lehane's two scores at a vital time which helped Cork to a 2-22 to 0-20 victory.

== Statistics ==
Up to date as of 2023 season

Team	All-Ireland	Provincial	National League	Total
Cork	30	54	14	98
Wexford	6	21	4	31
Combined	36	75	18	129

== All-time results ==
=== Legend ===
Cork win
Wexford win
Drawn game

=== Senior ===
No.	Date	Winners	Score	Runners-up	Venue	Stage
1.	16 November 1890	Cork (1)	1-6 - 2-2	Wexford	Clonturk Park	All-Ireland final
2.	14 June 1903	Cork (2)	2-8 - 0-6	Wexford	Carrick-on-Suir	All-Ireland home final
3.	5 September 1954	Cork (3)	1-9 - 1-6	Wexford	Croke Park	All-Ireland final
4.	23 September 1956	Wexford (1)	2-14 - 2-8	Cork	Croke Park	All-Ireland final
5.	6 September 1970	Cork (4)	6-21 - 5-10	Wexford	Croke Park	All-Ireland final
6.	5 September 1976	Cork (5)	2-21 - 4-11	Wexford	Croke Park	All-Ireland final
7.	4 September 1977	Cork (6)	1-17 - 3-8	Wexford	Croke Park	All-Ireland final
8.	10 August 2003	Cork	2-20 - 3-17	Wexford	Croke Park	All-Ireland semi-final
9.	16 August 2003	Cork (7)	3-17 - 2-7	Wexford	Croke Park	All-Ireland semi-final replay
10.	15 August 2004	Cork (8)	1-27 - 0-12	Wexford	Croke Park	All-Ireland semi-final
11.	14 July 2012	Cork (9)	3-24 - 2-17	Wexford	Semple Stadium	All-Ireland qualifier
12.	4 July 2015	Cork (10)	2-22 - 0-20	Wexford	Innovate Wexford Park	All-Ireland qualifier
13.	9 July 2016	Wexford (2)	0-23 - 1-17	Cork	Semple Stadium	All-Ireland qualifier

=== Intermediate ===
No.	Date	Winners	Score	Runners-up	Venue	Stage
1.	16 August 1964	Wexford (1)	2-8 - 1-5	Cork	Walsh Park	All-Ireland home final
2.	15 August 1965	Cork (1)	3-7 - 2-6	Wexford	Enniscorthy	All-Ireland home final
3.	29 October 2001	Cork (2)	2-17 - 2-8	Wexford	Fraher Field	All-Ireland final
4.	9 August 2014	Cork (3)	2-18 - 2-12	Wexford	Nowlan Park	All-Ireland final

=== Junior ===
No.	Date	Winners	Score	Runners-up	Venue	Stage
1.	4 August 1940	Cork (1)	5-8 - 3-2	Wexford	Wexford Park	All-Ireland semi-final
2.	25 July 1987	Cork (2)	3-11 - 2-13	Wexford	Semple Stadium	All-Ireland final
3.	15 August 1992	Cork	0-13 - 2-7	Wexford	Walsh Park	All-Ireland final
4.	30 August 1992	Wexford (1)	0-13 - 1-8	Cork	Walsh Park	All-Ireland final replay

=== Under-21 ===
No.	Date	Winners	Score	Runners-up	Venue	Stage
1.	1 October 1966	Cork	3-12 - 5-6	Wexford	Nowlan Park	All-Ireland final
2.	23 October 1966	Cork	4-9 - 4-9	Wexford	Gaelic Grounds	All-Ireland final replay
3.	13 November 1966	Cork (1)	9-9 - 5-9	Wexford	Croke Park	All-Ireland final second replay
4.	14 September 1969	Cork (2)	5-13 - 4-7	Wexford	Walsh Park	All-Ireland final
5.	11 October 1970	Cork	3-8 - 2-11	Wexford	Croke Park	All-Ireland final
6.	1 November 1970	Cork (3)	5-17 - 0-8	Wexford	Croke Park	All-Ireland final replay
7.	12 September 1971	Cork (4)	7-8 - 1-11	Wexford	Croke Park	All-Ireland final
8.	13 November 1966	Cork (5)	2-10 - 4-2	Wexford	Davin Park	All-Ireland final
9.	7 September 1997	Cork (6)	2-12 - 1-6	Wexford	Fraher Field	All-Ireland semi-final

=== Minor ===
No.	Date	Winners	Score	Runners-up	Venue	Stage
1.	4 September 1966	Wexford	6-7 - 6-7	Cork	Croke Park	All-Ireland final
2.	16 October 1966	Wexford (1)	4-1 - 1-8	Cork	Croke Park	All-Ireland final replay
3.	3 September 1967	Cork (1)	2-15 - 5-3	Wexford	Croke Park	All-Ireland final
4.	1 September 1968	Wexford (2)	2-13 - 3-7	Cork	Croke Park	All-Ireland final
5.	1 September 1985	Cork (2)	3-10 - 0-12	Wexford	Croke Park	All-Ireland final

== Records ==
=== Scorelines ===
- Biggest championship win:
  - For Cork: Cork 1-27 - 0-12, All-Ireland semi-final, Croke Park, 15 August 2004
  - For Wexford: Wexford 2-14 - 2-8 Cork, All-Ireland final, Fraher Field, 23 September 1956
- Highest aggregate:
  - Cork 6-21 - 5-10 Wexford, All-Ireland final, Croke Park, 6 September 1970

=== Most appearances ===
Team	Player	Championship games	Total
Cork	Tom Kenny	2003, 2003, 2004, 2012	4
Cork	Niall McCarthy	2003, 2003, 2004, 2012	4
Cork	Seán Óg Ó hAilpín|	2003, 2003, 2004, 2012	4

=== Top scorers ===
Team	Player	Score	Total
Cork	Charlie McCarthy	2-17	23
Cork	Patrick Horgan	0-23	23
Wexford	Mick Butler	2-9	15

- Top scorer in a single game:
  - For Cork: 1-9
    - Charlie McCarthy, Cork 6-21 - 5-10 Wexford, All-Ireland final, Croke Park, 6 September 1970
  - For Wexford: 0-13
    - Conor McDonald, Wexford 0-23 - 1-17 Cork, All-Ireland qualifier, Semple Stadium, 9 July 2016

=== Attendances ===
- Highest attendance:
  - 84,856 - Cork 1-9 - 1-6 Wexford, All-Ireland final, Croke Park, 23 September 1956
- Lowest attendance:
  - 20,142 - Cork 3-24 - 2-17 Wexford, All-Ireland qualifier, Semple Stadium, 14 July 2012
