= Billy Rackard =

Irish hurler and Gaelic footballer (1930–2009)

Personal information
- Native name: Liam Mac Riocaird (Irish)
- Nickname: Billy
- Born: 14 April 1930 Killane, County Wexford, Ireland
- Died: 23 March 2009 (aged 78) Oylegate, County Wexford, Ireland
- Occupation: Draper

Sport
- Sport: Hurling
- Position: Centre-back
Club
- Years: Club
- Rathnure
Club titles
- Wexford titles: 5
Inter-county
- Years: County
- 1949–1964: Wexford
Inter-county titles
- Leinster titles: 6
- All-Irelands: 3
- NHL: 2

Billy Rackard (14 April 1930 – 23 March 2009) was an Irish hurler and Gaelic footballer who played as a centre-back for the Wexford senior teams.

Regarded as one of Wexford's greatest players of all-time, Rackard made his first appearance for the team during the 1949–50 National League and was a regular member of the starting fifteen until his retirement before the 1964 championship. During that time he won three All-Ireland medals, six Leinster medals and two National Hurling League medals. Rackard was an All-Ireland runner-up on three occasions.

At club level Rackard was a five-time county club championship medalist with Rathnure.

Rackard's brothers, Nicky and Bobby, also experienced All-Ireland success with Wexford.

== Playing career ==
=== Club ===
Rackard played his club hurling with Rathnure and enjoyed much success in a lengthy career.

In 1948 he was a key member of the defence as Rathnure reached only their second championship decider ever. A 3–5 to 0–2 trouncing of reigning champions St. Aidan's gave Rackard his first championship medal.

After failing to retain their title the following year, Rathnure were back in the county decider once again in 1950. Another convincing 5–10 to 2–6 defeat of old rivals St. Aidan's gave Rackard his second championship medal.

It was 1955 before Rathnure qualified for another championship decider and four-in-a-row hopefuls St. Aidan's provided the opposition once again. A close game developed, however, a 2–9 to 2–5 victory gave Rackard a third championship medal.

After a number of years out of the limelight Rathnure reached the county final once again in 1961. A fourth defeat of St. Aidan's gave Rackard, who scored two goals from his full-forward berth, a fourth and final championship medal.

Rackard won a fifth and final championship medal in 1967.

=== Inter-county ===
Rackard first came to prominence on the inter-county scene as a member of the Wexford minor hurling team in the late 1940s. He enjoyed little success in this grade but was called up to the senior team in 1949 and made his debut in a National League game.

After losing the provincial final in 1950, Rackard was at wing-back the following year as Wexford faced Laois in the eastern decider. A 3–12 to 4–3 victory gave him his first Leinster medal as Wexford claimed the provincial crown for the first time since 1918. The subsequent All-Ireland decider saw three-in-a-row hopefuls Tipperary providing the opposition. Nicky Rackard's goal-scoring ability was quelled by Tipp goalkeeper Tony Reddin, while Séamus Bannon, Tim Ryan and Paddy Kenny scored key goals which powered Tipp to a 7–7 to 3–9 victory.

After back to back Leinster defeats over the next two years, Wexford faced Dublin in the 1954 decider. A huge 8–5 to 1–4 victory gave Rackard his second Leinster medal. A record crowd of 84,856 attended the subsequent All-Ireland decider with Cork providing the opposition. Wexford had a four-point lead with seventeen minutes left to play, however, history was against Rackard's side when Johnny Clifford scored the winning goal for Cork with just four minutes left. A 1–9 to 1–6 victory secured a third successive All-Ireland for Cork.

In 1955 Wexford continued their provincial dominance with Rackard collecting a third Leinster medal following a 5–6 to 3–9 defeat of Kilkenny in a replay of the Leinster final. Galway, who got a bye into the final without picking up a hurley, provided the opposition and took a half-time lead. A Tim Flood goal nine minutes from the end clinched a 3–13 to 2–8 victory and a first All-Ireland medal for Rackard. It was Wexford's first All-Ireland triumph in forty-five years.

Rackard added a National Hurling League medal to his collection in 1956 as Tipperary were bested by 5–9 to 2–14. The subsequent championship campaign saw Wexford reach the provincial final once again. A narrow 4–8 to 3–10 defeat of Kilkenny gave Rackard his fourth Leinster medal. Galway fell heavily in the All-Ireland semi-final, allowing Wexford to advance to an All-Ireland final meeting with Cork. The game has gone down in history as one of the all-time classics as Christy Ring was bidding for a record ninth All-Ireland medal. The game turned on one important incident as the Wexford goalkeeper, Art Foley, made a miraculous save from a Ring shot and cleared the sliotar up the field to set up another attack. Nicky Rackard scored a crucial goal with two minutes to go giving Wexford a 2–14 to 2–8 victory.

Two year later in 1958 Rackard added a second National League medal to his collection following a 5–7 to 4–8 defeat of Limerick.

In 1960 Wexford were back in the provincial decider. A narrow 3–10 to 2–11 defeat of Kilkenny gave Rackard his fifth Leinster medal. The All-Ireland decider saw Tipperary provide the opposition. A pitch invasion at the end resulted in much confusion, however, goals by Mick Hassett and Oliver McGrath gave Wexford a merited 2–15 to 0–11 victory. It was Rackard's third All-Ireland medal.

After surrendering their titles the following year, Wexford were back in 1962 with Rackard as captain. Another narrow 3–9 to 2–10 defeat of Kilkenny gave him a sixth Leinster medal. The All-Ireland final was a repeat of 1960 with Tipp, the reigning champions, lining out in opposition. Wexford got off to a disastrous start when Tom Moloughney and Seán McLoughlin scored goals for Tipp inside the first minute. Wexford fought back, however, Rackard's side were bested on a 3–10 to 2–11 score line.

Wexford faced early championship exits over the next two years and Rackard called time on his inter-county career in 1964.

=== Inter-provincial ===
Rackard also had the honour of being selected for Leinster in the inter-provincial series of games and enjoyed some success.

In 1954 he was on the extended panel as Leinster reached the final against Munster. He was introduced as a substitute and collected a Railway Cup medal following a low-scoring 0–9 to 0–5 victory.

Two years later he was on the starting fifteen as Leinster faced Munster once again. A 5–11 to 1–7 trouncing of their fierce rivals gave Rackard a second Railway Cup medal.

After five years of Munster dominance, Leinster fought back in 1962. A narrow 1–11 to 1–9 defeat of the six-in-a-row hopefuls gave Rackard a third Railway Cup medal.

Two years later Rackard added a fourth and final Railway Cup medal to his collection as Munster were bested once again in the decider.

== Post-playing career ==
Rackard sought election to Dáil Éireann but did not win.

== Honours ==
Rathnure

- Wexford Senior Hurling Championship (5): 1948, 1950, 1955, 1961

Wexford

- All-Ireland Senior Hurling Championship (3): 1955, 1956, 1960
- Leinster Senior Hurling Championship (6): 1951, 1954, 1955, 1956, 1960, 1962
- National Hurling League (2): 1955–56, 1957–58

Leinster

- Railway Cup (4): 1954, 1956, 1962, 1964

Sporting positions
Preceded by Ned Wheeler	Wexford Senior Hurling Captain; 1962	Succeeded by
Awards
Preceded by Jackie Power (Limerick)	GAA All-Time All-Star Award shared with Bobby Rackard; 1992	Succeeded by Pat Stakelum (Tipperary)
