= 1956 All-Ireland Senior Hurling Championship final =

1956 All-Ireland Senior Hurling Final
- Event: 1956 All-Ireland Senior Hurling Championship
Wexford	Cork
2-14	2-8
- Date: 23 September 1956
- Venue: Croke Park, Dublin
- Referee: T. O'Sullivan (Limerick)
- Attendance: 83,096

The 1956 Final was the 69th final of the All-Ireland Senior Hurling Championship and the culmination of the 1956 All-Ireland Senior Hurling Championship, an inter-county hurling tournament for the top teams in Ireland. The match was held at Croke Park, Dublin, on 23 September 1956, between Cork and Wexford. The Munster champions lost to their Leinster opponents on a score line of 2-14 to 2-8.

With 83,096 spectators present, this game has the second highest attendance of any hurling final since 1887. The final was delayed for a number of weeks because of an outbreak of polio in Cork.

== All-Ireland final ==
=== Overview ===
The All-Ireland senior hurling finale between Cork and Wexford took place in 1956 on Sunday September 23. The game was postponed by three weeks due an outbreak of Polio across Munster. Cork was appearing in their fourth championship decider in five years, having won the previous three finals. Wexford last appeared in the championship decider in 1955, when they defeated Galway to capture their second All-Ireland title ever. Cork and Wexford last met in the All-Ireland final in 1954 with Cork taking the spoils on that occasion.

Once again, a huge crowd of 83,096 turned out in Croke Park to see another eagerly anticipated All-Ireland hurling finale between the two teams. While the attendance was marginally smaller than the sides last encounter, the interest was just as great. Christy Ring was going for his eighth All-Ireland winners medal while Wexford was seeking the ultimate endorsement of greatness; victory over Cork in an All-Ireland finale and second championship in a row.

=== Match report ===
At 3:15pm the sliothar was thrown-in and the game began in earnest. Cork got off to a bad start with a point by Tim Flood and a goal by Padge Kehoe giving Wexford a strong lead after just three minutes. Cork's fortunes failed to turn when Tony O'Shaughnessy was forced to retire early with a head injury while Vincy Twomey came on as the substitute. Three points by Christy Ring and one each by Mick Regan and Éamonn Goulding kept Cork within striking distance at the interval. Wexford could have been in real trouble in the first half, but for the quick thinking of Mick Morrissey who swept the sliothar away from the goal line denied Cork an almost certain goal. Tim Flood, Nicky Rackard, Martin Codd, and Tom Dixon chipped in with further points for Wexford to ensure a 1-6 to 0-5 lead at half-time.

In the dressing room at half-time the Cork selectors toyed with the idea of reintroducing Tony O’Shaughnessy while also moving Willie John Daly up to the attack where he could be more effective. This plan was rejected and Cork made no changes at the break. Wexford were much better immediately after the restart with the Rackard brothers, Nicky and Bobby, converting two more frees. Martin Codd had Wexford seven points ahead shortly afterwards when Martin Codd sent the sliothar between he posts after a lively solo run. Just when it looked as if the game was running away from Cork, Christy Ring stood up to take a close-in free. He had only one thing on his mind as the sliothar ended up being rifled into the Wexford net for a goal. Immediately after the puck-out, Ring went on the attack again, racing through the Wexford defence before sending a left-handed shot over the crossbar for another point. These scores lifted Cork, however, Padge Kehoe fought back with a fine point before Paddy Barry responded with an even finer score that went straight between the posts. Cork was definitely on the way up after these scores. Terry Kelly sent the sliothar in towards the goal mouth and it was promptly gobbled up by Paddy Barry. The Sarsfields hurler headed toward goalkeeper, Art Foley, and there was no mistake in sending the sliothar straight into the net. Cork had taken a remarkable lead as the red and white flags and bunting popped up all over the stadium. Soon afterwards the sliothar came to Ring, who busted through the defence once again. Although hindered by Bobby Rackard, he was still able to palm the sliothar over the crossbar to give Cork a one-point lead with ten minutes left to play. The Wexford men, who were in the same position two years earlier, steadied themselves and began the fight back. The play moved to the other end of the field, and Nicky Rackard made no mistake in scoring the equalizer within a minute of Ring's point. The Cork defence was under severe trouble, and conceded two frees which Rackard promptly converted. Wexford had a two-point cushion once again.

=== Final moments ===
The decisive passage of play came within three minutes to go. In the blink of an eye the play switched to the Cork attackers, as Christy Ring caught the sliothar in the left full-forward position. He made a dash across the goalmouth shouldering his teammate, Paddy Barry, out of the way en route. Ring sent in a shot towards the net, but Art Foley blocked it, deflected it into his hand and cleared it down the field. A whole host of legends have developed about the save that has gone down in history as one of the most important plays of the championship. Michael O'Hehir, commentating live on Radio Éireann, described it as follows:

Paddy Philpott, standing all alone, 50 yards from his own goal, gets the ball and sends it up into the centre of the field. The clash of the ash as it blocks down there by Terry Kelly. Terry Kelly up there to Christy Ring. Ring in front of the goal is going through. He steadies himself, he takes a shot. It's blocked by Art Foley and it's cleared out by Art Foley. Oh, a great clearance there by Art Foley.

Moments later, following another intervention by Foley, Wexford struck for their second goal. The sliothar was moved up the field where it was caught by Tom Ryan. Ryan passed the sliothar to Nicky Rackard who made no mistake in sending it into the Cork net, past goalkeeper Mick Cashman. This score, which clinched the game for Wexford, was quickly followed by the final score of the game, a point for Wexford by Tom Dixon. This passage of play was described by O'Hehir as follows:

Time ticking away now and English sends it away up the field. Wexford attacking again and the ball goes out on the wing to Tom Ryan. Tom Ryan and Vin Twomey going for it. Ryan trying to solo his way through. His way is blocked by Vin Twomey. He goes back for the ball, he hand-passes it across the centre. Out comes Nicky Rackard, 21 yards out, he can take a shot. He takes a shot, and it's a goal. It's a goal. It's a goal and you've never seen such excitement in all your life. Hats, coats, everything you can think of have gone into the air and the whole of Croke Park has gone stark staring wild. And with time ticking away, Wexford lead 2-13, 2-13 to 2-8, and one of the Cork backs is down injured in front of his parallelogram. And there goes a shot now taken by Tom Dixon and it's gone over the bar for a point for Wexford to leave it 2-14 to 2-8.

A score line of 2-14 to 2-8 gave victory to Wexford and a first-ever defeat over Cork. When the final whistle was sounded, the huge crowd at Croke Park witnessed an unprecedented display of sportsmanship as an exuberant Nick O’Donnell, a shy and soft-spoken farmer, planted a large kiss on Ring's cheek. He then helped Bobby Rackard and Art Foley carry Ring shoulder-high off the pitch.

=== Statistics ===
1956-09-23
15:15 UTC+1
Final

Wexford	2-14 – 2-8	Cork
N. Rackard (1-5), Padge Kehoe (1-1), T. Flood (0-3), T. Dixon (0-2), M. Codd (0-2), Billy Rackard (0-1).		C. Ring (1-5), P. Barry (1-1), M. Regan (0-1), É. Goulding (0-1).

Croke Park, Dublin
Attendance: 83,096
Referee: T. O'Sullivan (Limerick)

Wexford	Cork
