= Jimmy Rackard =

Irish hurler (1925–1985

Personal information
- Native name: Séamus Mac Riocaird (Irish)
- Born: 5 October 1925 Killane, County Wexford, Ireland
- Died: 19 June 1985 (aged 59) Dublin, Ireland

Sport
- Sport: Hurling
- Position: Goalkeeper
Club
- Years: Club
- Rathnure
Club titles
- Wexford titles: 2
Inter-county
- Years: County
- Wexford
Inter-county titles
- Leinster titles: 1
- All-Irelands: 0
- NHL: 0

James Joseph Rackard (5 October 1925 – 19 June 1985) was an Irish hurler. At club level, he played with Rathnure and at inter-county level with the Wexford senior hurling team.

== Career ==
Rackard first played hurling at club level with Rathnure. He was part of the Rathnure teams that won Wexford SHC titles in 1948 and 1950. These victories brought him to the attention of the Wexford senior hurling team selectors and he soon joined his brothers – Nicky, Bobby and Billy - on the team. Rackard won a Leinster SHC as goalkeeper in 1951, following a 3–12 to 4–03 win over Laois in the final. He was dropped from the team for the subsequent All-Ireland SHC final defeat by Tipperary.

== Death ==
Rackard died on 19 June 1985, at the age of 59.

== Honours ==
Rathnure

- Wexford Senior Hurling Championship: 1948, 1950

Wexford

- Leinster Senior Hurling Championship: 1951
