= Sam Thorpe =

Irish hurler

Personal information
- Native name: Somhairle Ó Torpaigh (Irish)
- Nickname: Wilkie
- Born: 3 March 1919 Enniscorthy, County Wexford, Ireland
- Died: 1 November 2005 (aged 86) Enniscorthy, County Wexford, Ireland
- Occupation: Army officer
- Height: 5 ft 8 in (173 cm)

Sport
- Sport: Hurling
- Position: Right wing-back
Clubs
- Years: Club
- Slaney Harriers; Starlights; St Aidan's Enniscorthy
Club titles
- Wexford titles: 4
Inter-county
- Years: County
- 1946-1953: Wexford
Inter-county titles
- Leinster titles: 1
- All-Irelands: 0
- NHL: 0

Samuel Thorpe (3 March 1919 – 1 November 2005), known as Wilkie Thorpe, was an Irish Gaelic footballer and hurler. At club level, he played with Slaney Harriers, Starlights and St Aidan's Enniscorthy and at inter-county level was a dual player with Wexford.

== Playing career ==
Thorpe played both Gaelic football and hurling with a range of different clubs. He won a Wexford MFC medal with Starlights before later lining out in various Army championships during the Emergency. Thorpe later won consecutive Wexford SHC medals with St Aidan's Enniscorthy in 1946 and 1947, as well as claiming a Wexford JFC with Slaney Harriers in the latter year. He ended his club career by winning further Wexford SHC medals with St Aidan's in 1952 and 1953.

Thorpe first appeared on the inter-county scene with Wexford as a member of the minor team beaten by Cavan in the 1937 All-Ireland MFC final. He made his Wexford senior football team debut in a National League game against Dublin in May 1946. Thorpe joined the Wexford senior hurling team shortly after his. He won a Leinster SHC medal before losing to Tipperary in the 1951 All-Ireland SHC final. Thorpe also lined out with Leinster in both codes.

== Death ==
Thorpe died on 1 November 2005, at the age of 86.

== Honours ==
Slaney Harriers

- Wexford Junior Football Championship: 1947

St Aidan's Enniscorthy

- Wexford Senior Hurling Championship: 1946, 1947, 1952, 1953

Wexford

- Leinster Senior Hurling Championship: 1951
- Leinster Minor Football Championship: 1937
