= Martin Codd =

Irish singer, author and hurler

Personal information
- Native name: Máirtín Mac Oda (Irish)
- Born: 1929 Clonroche, County Wexford, Ireland
- Died: 2 May 2008 (aged 78–79) Clonroche, County Wexford, Ireland
- Occupation: Farmer

Sport
- Sport: Hurling
- Position: Centre-forward
Club
- Years: Club
- Rathnure
Club titles
	Football	Hurling
Wexford titles	1	3
Inter-county
- Years: County
- 1949–1965: Wexford
Inter-county titles
- Leinster titles: 65
- All-Irelands: 56
- NHL: 58

Martin Codd (1929 – 2 May 2008) was an Irish singer, author and hurler who played as a centre-forward for the Wexford senior teams.

Martin Codd made his first appearance for the team during the 1949 championship and was a regular member of the starting fifteen until his retirement before the 1965 championship. During that time he won one All-Ireland medal, one Leinster medal and ine National Hurling League medal. Codd was an All-Ireland runner-up on one occasion.

At club level Codd was a three-time county club championship medalist with Rathnure.

Codd's grandson, Paul Codd, was also an All-Ireland medalist with Wexford.

== Playing career ==
=== Club ===
Codd played his club hurling and Gaelic football with Rathnure and enjoyed much success in a lengthy career.

In 1950 he was a key member of the team as Rathnure reached only their third championship decider ever. A 5-10 to 2-6 defeat of old rivals St. Aidan's gave Codd his first championship medal.

Two years later in 1952 Codd was captain of the Rathnure senior football team. A defeat of Gusserane O'Rahilly's gave him a Wexford Senior Football Championship medal.

It was 1955 before Rathnure qualified for another hurling championship decider and four-in-a-row hopefuls St. Aidan's provided the opposition once again. A close game developed, however, a 2-9 to 2-5 victory gave Codd a second championship medal.

After a number of years out of the limelight Rathnure reached the county final once again in 1961. Another defeat of St. Aidan's gave Codd, who was captain of the team, a third and final championship medal.

He has a grandson named Bobby Codd

=== Inter-county ===
Codd first came to prominence on the inter-county scene when he joined the Wexford senior team in 1949. His appearances for the team were sporadic as he failed to command a regular place on the starting 15.

After playing no part in the successful provincial campaign in 1956, Codd was later named at centre-forward as Wexford advanced to an All-Ireland final meeting with Cork. The game has gone down in history as one of the all-time classics as Christy Ring was bidding for a record ninth All-Ireland medal. The game turned on one important incident as the Wexford goalkeeper, Art Foley, made a miraculous save from a Ring shot and cleared the sliotar up the field to set up another attack. Nicky Rackard scored a crucial goal with two minutes to go giving Wexford a 2-14 to 2-8 victory. The victory also gave Codd an All-Ireland medal.

Two year later in 1958 Codd added a National Hurling League medal to his collection following a 5-7 to 4-8 defeat of Limerick.

After a prolonged absence from the team Codd was back at full-forward in 1965. He won his first Leinster medal on the field of play that year following a narrow 2-11 to 3-7 defeat of Kilkenny. The subsequent All-Ireland decider saw Tipperary aiming to capture a remarkable fourth championship in five years. Wexford were completely outclassed courtesy of two unorthodox hand-passed goals by Seán McLoughlin and seven unanswered points in the last quarter. The 2-16 to 0-10 defeat brought the curtain down on Codd's inter-county career.

== Post-playing career ==
When his playing days ended Codd turned to music and toured with the popular Herdsmen showband. The band played professionally on the roads from 1969 taking in some seven years when they played at all the leading venues throughout Ireland and Britain. Codd also had a large musical following at Fleadh Cheoil competitions throughout the country, resulting in the making of several CDs in the late nineties. During his professional playing career, one of Codd's and the band's biggest hits 'Whisper Your Mother's Name' was in the Irish charts for some time, while in later years he recorded 'Cuchulainn's Son'.'

2006 saw the publication of "The Way I Saw It: Nicky Rackard leads Wexford to Hurling Glory", written by Codd himself, which chronicles the path of the Wexford hurling team he was part.

== Honours ==
=== Team ===
Rathnure

- Wexford Senior Club Hurling Championship (3): 1950, 1955, 1961 (c)
- Wexford Senior Club Football Championship (1): 1952 (c)

Wexford

- All-Ireland Senior Hurling Championship (1): 1956
- Leinster Senior Hurling Championship (1): 1965
- National Hurling League (1): 1957-58
