= Jim English =

Wexford hurler (1932–2008)

Personal information
- Native name: Séamus Inglis (Irish)
- Born: October 1932 Ballindoney, County Wexford, Ireland
- Died: 23 February 2008 (aged 75) Muine Bheag, County Carlow, Ireland
- Occupation: Foreman
- Height: 5 ft 9 in (175 cm)

Sport
- Sport: Hurling
- Position: Right wing-back
Clubs
- Years: Club
- Rathnure; Erin's Own
Inter-county
- Years: County
- 1951–1964: Wexford
Inter-county titles
- Leinster titles: 5
- All-Irelands: 3
- NHL: 2

Jim English (October 1932 – 23 February 2008) was an Irish hurler who played as a right wing-back for the Wexford senior team.

English joined the team during the 1951 championship and subsequently became a regular member of the starting fifteen until his retirement after the 1964 championship. During that time he won three All-Ireland medals, five Leinster medals and two National Hurling League medals. In 1956 English captained the team to the All-Ireland title.

At club level English enjoyed a successful career with Rathnure in Wexford and later with Erin's Own in Carlow. He won numerous club championship winners' medals in both codes.

== Playing career ==
=== Club ===
English began his club hurling career with Rathnure and enjoyed much success.

In 1955 he was a key member of the defence as Rathnure reached only the championship decider with four-in-a-row hopefuls St Aidan's provided the opposition. A close game developed, however, a 2–9 to 2–5 victory gave English a Wexford Senior Hurling Championship medal.

English later transferred to the Erin's Own club in Muine Bheag.

=== Inter-county ===
English first came to prominence on the inter-county scene as a member of the Wexford minor hurling team during their unsuccessful championship campaign in 1950.

In 1951 English joined the Wexford senior hurling team. He was an unused substitute that year as the team secured a first Leinster crown since 1918 but later lost the All-Ireland decider to Tipperary.

After back to back Leinster defeats over the next two years, Wexford faced Dublin in the 1954 decider. A huge 8–5 to 1–4 victory gave English his first Leinster medal on the field of play. A record crowd of 84,856 attended the subsequent All-Ireland decider with Cork providing the opposition. Wexford had a four-point lead with seventeen minutes left to play, however, history was against Rackard's side when Johnny Clifford scored the winning goal for Cork with just four minutes left. A 1–9 to 1–6 victory secured a third successive All-Ireland for Cork and defeat for English.

In 1955 Wexford continued their provincial dominance with English collecting a second Leinster medal following a 5–6 to 3–9 defeat of Kilkenny in a replay of the Leinster final. Galway, who got a bye into the final without picking up a hurley, provided the opposition and took a half-time lead. A Tim Flood goal nine minutes from the end clinched a 3–13 to 2–8 victory and a first All-Ireland medal for English. It was Wexford's first All-Ireland triumph in forty-five years.

English was captain of the side in 1956 and added a National Hurling League medal to his collection as Tipperary were bested by 5–9 to 2–14. The subsequent championship campaign saw Wexford reach the provincial final once again. A narrow 4–8 to 3–10 defeat of Kilkenny gave English his third Leinster medal. Galway fell heavily in the All-Ireland semi-final, allowing Wexford to advance to an All-Ireland final meeting with Cork. The game has gone down in history as one of the all-time classics as Christy Ring was bidding for a record ninth All-Ireland medal. The game turned on one important incident as the Wexford goalkeeper, Art Foley, made a miraculous save from a Ring shot and cleared the sliotar up the field to set up another attack. Nicky Rackard scored a crucial goal with two minutes to go giving Wexford a 2–14 to 2–8 victory. It was English's second All-Ireland medal while he also had the honour of lifting the Liam MacCarthy Cup.

Two year later in 1958 English added a second National League medal to his collection following a 5–7 to 4–8 defeat of Limerick.

In 1960 Wexford were back in the provincial decider. A narrow 3–10 to 2–11 defeat of Kilkenny gave English his fourth Leinster medal. The All-Ireland decider saw Tipperary provide the opposition. A pitch invasion at the end resulted in much confusion, however, goals by Mick Hassett and Oliver McGrath gave Wexford a merited 2–15 to 0–11 victory. It was English's third All-Ireland medal.

After surrendering their titles the following year, Wexford were back in 1962. Another narrow 3–9 to 2–10 defeat of Kilkenny gave English a sixth Leinster medal. The All-Ireland final was a repeat of 1960 with Tipperary, the reigning champions, lining out in opposition. Wexford got off to a disastrous start when Tom Moloughney and Seán McLoughlin scored goals for Tipp inside the first minute. Wexford fought back, however, English's side were bested on a 3–10 to 2–11 score line.

Wexford faced early championship exits over the next two years and English called time on his inter-county career in 1964.

=== Inter-provincial ===
English also had the honour of being selected for Leinster in the inter-provincial series of games and enjoyed some success.

In 1956 he was on the starting fifteen as Leinster faced Munster. A 5–11 to 1–7 trouncing of their fierce rivals gave English a Railway Cup medal.

After five years of Munster dominance, Leinster fought back in 1962. A narrow 1–11 to 1–9 defeat of the six-in-a-row hopefuls gave English a second Railway Cup medal.

== Post-playing career ==
In retirement from play English maintained a keen interest in hurling. In 1972 he was elected Leinster Council delegate for Carlow, serving in that position until 1992. That year English became Chairman of the Carlow County Board.

== Personal life ==
Jim English was born in Ballindoney, County Wexford in 1932. Son of Thomas & Mary Kate, Brothers Paddy, Tommy, Matty, John, Joe & Sisters Maggie (Rowe) Maureen (Walsh) He grew up on the family farm and from a young age he showed a great interest in the game of hurling. English was educated locally and later attended New Ross CBS where he first tasted hurling success.

Sporting positions
Preceded by Nick O'Donnell	Wexford Senior Hurling Captain; 1956	Succeeded by Tom Ryan
Achievements
Preceded by Nick O'Donnell (Wexford)	All-Ireland SHC winning captain 1956	Succeeded by Mickey Kelly (Kilkenny
