= 1956 Wexford Senior Hurling Championship =

Annual hurling competition season

- Champions: St Aidan's Enniscorthy (6th title)
- Runners-up: Cloughbawn

The 1956 Wexford Senior Hurling Championship was the 46th completed staging of the Wexford Senior Hurling Championship since its establishment by the Wexford County Board in 1889.

Rathnure entered the championship as the defending champions.

The final was played on 7 October 1956 at the Bellefield Grounds in Enniscorthy, between St Aidan's Enniscorthy and Cloughbawn. St Aidan's Enniscorthy won the match by 5–08 to 1–08 to claim their sixth championship title overall and a first title in two years.

== Results ==
=== Final ===
7 October 1956 Final	St Aidan's Enniscorthy	5-08 - 1-08	Cloughbawn	Bellefield Grounds
