= Nick O'Donnell (hurler) =

Kilkenny and Wexford hurler (1925–1988

Personal information
- Native name: Nioclás Ó Dónaill (Irish)
- Nickname: Nicko
- Born: 4 September 1925 Graiguenamanagh, County Kilkenny, Ireland
- Died: 11 June 1988 (aged 62) Enniscorthy, County Wexford, Ireland
- Occupation: Roadstone employee

Sport
- Sport: Hurling
- Position: Full-back
Clubs
- Years: Club
- Éire Óg; St Aidan's Enniscorthy
Club titles
- Wexford titles: 7
Inter-county*
Years	County	Apps (scores)
1947–1950 1951–1962	Kilkenny; Wexford	0 (0–0); 35 (0–0)
Inter-county titles
- Leinster titles: 6
- All-Irelands: 3
- NHL: 2
- *Inter County team apps and scores correct as of 23:25, 16 July 2013.

Nicholas "Skinny" O'Donnell (4 September 1925 – 11 June 1988) was an Irish hurler who played as a full-back for the Kilkenny and Wexford senior teams.

Born in Graiguenamanagh, County Kilkenny, O'Donnell first played competitive hurling whilst at school in St Kieran's College. He arrived on the inter-county scene at the age of twenty-one when he first linked up with the Kilkenny junior team. He joined the senior team for the 1947 championship, however, after failing to secure a place on the starting fifteen he later joined the Wexford team. O'Donnell went on to play a key part for Wexford during a golden age for the team, and won three All-Ireland medals, six Leinster medals and two National Hurling League medals. An All-Ireland runner-up on three occasions, O'Donnell also captained the team to All-Ireland victory in 1955 and 1960.

As a member of the Leinster inter-provincial team for five years, O'Donnell won just one Railway Cup medal. At club level he won seven championship medals with St Aidan's Enniscorthy, having earlier played for Éire Óg.

After a fifteen-year inter-county career, O'Donnell retired from inter-county hurling following Wexford's defeat by Tipperary in the 1962 championship

O'Donnell is widely regarded as the undisputed greatest full-back in the history of the game. During his playing days he was named Texaco Hurler of the Year in 1960. He has been repeatedly voted onto teams made up of the sport's greats, including at full-back on the Hurling Team of the Century in 1984 and the Hurling Team of the Millennium in 2000.

== Biography ==
Nicholas O'Donnell was born in Graiguenamanagh, County Kilkenny in 1925. He was educated locally and was known as a shy and retiring gentleman. O'Donnell lived in Graiguenamanagh until 1950 when he moved to Enniscorthy, County Wexford to work with Roadstone Ltd. He remained in his adopted county until his death in 1988. Due to his noticeably slender frame, he received the nickname "skinny" early on in his career.

== Playing career ==
=== Club ===
O'Donnell began his club hurling career with Éire Óg in Kilkenny.

In 1947 he lined out in his first championship decider. Tullaroan provided the opposition, however, a 3–10 to 0–13 victory gave O'Donnell a Kilkenny Senior Hurling Championship medal.

A move to Wexford saw O'Donnell join the St Aidan's Enniscorthy club in Enniscorthy. In 1952 the club reached the county decider. Horsewood provided the opposition, however, a victory for St. Aidan's gave O'Donnell his first championship medal with his adopted club.

It was the first of three-in-a-row for St. Aidan's, as subsequent victories over Geraldine O'Hanrahan's in 1953 and Horsewood in 1954 gave O'Donnell two more championship medals.

Four-in-a-row proved beyond St. Aidan's, however, the club bounced back in 1956 with O'Donnell winning a fourth championship medal in Wexford. Once again St. Aidan's went on to dominate the club championship and secured four successive championship titles, bringing O'Donnell's overall medal tally to seven.

=== Inter-county ===
O'Donnell first played at inter-county level with the Kilkenny junior team in 1946. Unable to dislodge Pat "the Diamond" Hayden from the full-back position on the team, he won a set of Leinster and All-Ireland medals as a non-playing substitute.

Success in this grade earned O'Donnell a call-up to the Kilkenny senior team. Once again, Hayden stood in the way of O'Donnell being picked on the starting fifteen. In spite if this he was an unused substitute when Kilkenny captured the Leinster crown. O'Donnell was a substitute again when Kilkenny later defeated Cork by 0–14 to 2–7 in, what has been described as, the greatest All-Ireland final of all time. In spite of being a named substitute, he received no All-Ireland medal. Kilkenny had a panel of twenty-two for the game but only received twenty-one All-Ireland medals. O'Donnell was deemed the last man, a decision which rankled with him for the rest of his life. He later said: "Kilkenny, my native county, still 'owes' me an All-Ireland senior hurling championship medal – the one I never got when I was a member of the panel of Kilkenny's championship of 1947. I was never bitter about it, but I always felt very disappointed about it. It was my first All-Ireland senior one."

O'Donnell soldiered with the Kilkenny team for another few years without any hope of breaking onto the starting fifteen.

A move to Wexford saw him declare for their senior hurling team in 1951. He made his debut at full-back against Dublin that year, before later lining out in his first provincial decider. A 3–12 to 4–3 defeat of Laois gave O'Donnell his first Leinster medal. A subsequent defeat of Galway saw Wexford qualify for the All-Ireland final on 2 September 1951, their first appearance in the decider since 1918. Tipperary provided the opposition as they aimed to secure a hat-trick of championship titles for the first time in over half a century. Nicky Rackard, Wexford's goal-scoring machine, was nullified by Tipp goalkeeper Tony Reddin, while Séamus Bannon, Tim Ryan and Paddy Kenny scored key goals which powered Tipp to a 7–7 to 3–9 victory.

Wexford faced back-to-back provincial decider defeats over the next two years, however, in 1954 the team regrouped. A huge 8–5 to 1–4 defeat of Dublin gave O'Donnell a second Leinster medal. Cork provided the opposition in the subsequent All-Ireland final on 5 September 1954 and, once again, it was a historic occasion as Cork's Christy Ring was provided with an opportunity of capturing a record-breaking eighth All-Ireland medal. A record attendance of 84,856 packed into Croke Park, and Wexford had the reigning champions and three-in-a-row hopefuls rattled. O'Donnell's side had a 1–3 to 0–5 lead at the interval, however, he was forced to leave the field with an injured collarbone after a clash with Ring. Wexford still had a four-point lead at the three-quarter stage, however, Johnny Clifford scored a vital goal to secure a 1–9 to 1–6 victory for Cork.

In 1955 O'Donnell was honoured with the captaincy, as Wexford continued their provincial dominance. He collected a third Leinster medal that year following a 5–6 to 3–9 defeat of Kilkenny in a replay of the Leinster final. Galway, who got a bye into the All-Ireland final without picking up a hurley, provided the opposition on 4 September 1955. A Tim Flood goal nine minutes from the end clinched a 3–13 to 2–8 victory for Wexford and a first All-Ireland medal for O'Donnell, while he also had the honour of lifting the Liam MacCarthy Cup. It was Wexford's first All-Ireland triumph in forty-five years.

Wexford continued their dominance in 1956. A 5–9 to 2–14 defeat of Tipperary gave O'Donnell a first National Hurling League medal. The subsequent championship campaign saw Wexford reach the provincial final once again. A narrow 4–8 to 3–10 defeat of Kilkenny gave O'Donnell his fourth Leinster medal. Galway fell heavily in the All-Ireland semi-final, allowing Wexford to advance to an All-Ireland final meeting with Cork on 23 September 1956. The game has gone down in history as one of the all-time classics as Christy Ring was bidding for a record ninth All-Ireland medal. The game turned on one important incident as the Wexford goalkeeper, Art Foley, made a miraculous save from a Ring shot and cleared the sliotar up the field to set up another attack. Nicky Rackard scored a crucial goal with two minutes to go giving Wexford a 2–14 to 2–8 victory. In spite of Cork's loss Wexford's O'Donnell]] and Rackard, in an unparalleled display of sportsmanship in any game, raised Christy Ring onto their shoulders and carried him off the field. Wexford had won the game and O'Donnell had collected his second All-Ireland medal but there was no doubt in their minds that the real hero was Ring.

Two years later in 1958, O'Donnell added a second National League medal to his collection following a 5–7 to 4–8 defeat of Limerick.

In 1960 O'Donnell was captain once again, and Wexford were back in the provincial decider. A narrow 3–10 to 2–11 defeat of Kilkenny gave O'Donnel his fifth Leinster medal. The All-Ireland decider on 4 September 1960 saw Tipperary provide the opposition. A pitch invasion at the end resulted in much confusion, however, goals by Mick Hassett and Oliver McGrath gave Wexford a merited 2–15 to 0–11 victory. It was O'Donnell's third All-Ireland medal and his second time lifting the Liam MacCarthy Cup.

After surrendering their titles the following year, Wexford were back in 1962. Another narrow 3–9 to 2–10 defeat of Kilkenny gave O'Donnell a sixth Leinster medal. The All-Ireland final on 2 September 1962 was a repeat of 1960 with Tipperary, the reigning champions, lining out in opposition. Wexford, however, were not the force of old and the side got off to possibly the worst start ever by a team in a championship decider. After just ninety seconds the Leinster champions were down by two goals, courtesy of Tom Moloughney and Seán McLoughlin. The game, however, turned out to be much closer than people expected. Tipp eventually secured the win on a score line of 3–10 to 2–11. O'Donnell retired from inter-county hurling following this defeat.

=== Inter-provincial ===
In 1956, having previously been told that there was no place for him on the team, O'Donnell took over the full-back position on the Leinster inter-provincial team. That year he captained his province to victory and was accompanied on the team by nine of his fellow Wexford players. He continued to play with Leinster until 1961, however, Munster were the dominant force in the Railway Cup at the time.

== Recognition ==
Over twenty years after his retirement from playing, O'Donnell received the ultimate honour during the GAA's centenary year in 1984 when he was chosen at full-back on the Hurling Team of the Century. His reputation as the undisputed greatest full-back of all time was further cemented in 2000 when he was named in the same position on the Hurling Team of the Millennium.

Sporting positions
Preceded by Padge Kehoe	Wexford Senior Hurling Captain; 1955	Succeeded by Jim English
Preceded by	Wexford Senior Hurling Captain; 1960	Succeeded by Ned Wheeler
Achievements
Preceded by Christy Ring (Cork)	All-Ireland SHC winning captain 1955	Succeeded by Jim English (Wexford)
Preceded by Frankie Walsh (Waterford)	All-Ireland SHC winning captain 1960	Succeeded by Matt Hassett (Tipperary)
Awards
Preceded by Christy Ring (Cork)	Texaco Hurler of the Year; 1960	Succeeded by Liam Devaney (Tipperary)
