= 1955 Wexford Senior Hurling Championship =

Annual hurling competition season

- Champions: Rathnure (3rd title); Jim English (captain)
- Runners-up: St Aidan's Enniscorthy; Tom Dixon (captain)

The 1955 Wexford Senior Hurling Championship was the 45th completed staging of the Wexford Senior Hurling Championship since its establishment by the Wexford County Board in 1889.

St Aidan's Enniscorthy entered the championship as the defending champions.

The final was played on 6 November 1955 at O'Kennedy Park in New Ross, between Rathnure and St Aidan's Enniscorthy. Rathnure won the match by 2–09 to 2–05 to claim their third championship title overall and a first title in five years.

== Results ==
=== Final ===
6 November 1955 Final	Rathnure	2-09 - 2-05	St Aidan's Enniscorthy	O'Kennedy Park
