= 1959 Wexford Senior Hurling Championship =

Annual hurling competition season

- Champions: St Aidan's Enniscorthy (9th title)
- Runners-up: Faythe Harriers

The 1959 Wexford Senior Hurling Championship was the 49th completed staging of the Wexford Senior Hurling Championship since its establishment by the Wexford County Board in 1889.

St Aidan's Enniscorthy entered the championship as the defending champions.

The final was played on 1 November 1959 at Wexford Park, between St Aidan's Enniscorthy and Faythe Harriers. St Aidan's Enniscorthy won the match by 1–07 to 1–05 to claim their ninth championship title overall and a record fourth consecutive title.

== Results ==
=== Final ===
1 November 1959 Final	St Aidan's Enniscorthy	1-07 - 1-05	Faythe Harriers	O'Kennedy Park
