= 1962 All-Ireland Senior Hurling Championship =

Championship details
- Dates: 15 April – 2 September 1962
- Teams: 12

All-Ireland champions
- Winning team: Tipperary (19th win)
- Captain: Jimmy Doyle

All-Ireland Finalists
- Losing team: Wexford
- Captain: Billy Rackard

Provincial champions
- Munster: Tipperary
- Leinster: Wexford
- Ulster: Not Played
- Connacht: Not Played

Championship statistics
- No. matches played: 12
- Goals total: 75 (6.25 per game)
- Points total: 215 (19.9 per game)
- Top Scorer: Jimmy Doyle (4–24)
- Player of the Year: Donie Nealon
- All-Star Team: See here

The 1962 All-Ireland Senior Hurling Championship was the 76th staging of the All-Ireland hurling championship since its establishment by the Gaelic Athletic Association in 1887. The championship began on 15 April 1962 and ended on 2 September 1962.

Tipperary were the defending champions, and retained the championship after defeating Wexford by 3–10 to 2–11 in the All-Ireland final.

== Teams ==
A total of twelve teams contested the championship.

=== Team summaries ===
Team	Colours	Most recent success		
Team	Colours	All-Ireland	Provincial	League
Clare	Saffron and blue	1914	1932	1945–46
Cork	Red and white	1954	1956	1952–53
Dublin	Blue and navy	1938	1961	1938–39
Galway	Maroon and white	1923		1950–51
Kilkenny	Black and amber	1957	1959	1962–63
Laois	Blue and white	1915	1949	
Limerick	Green and white	1940	1955	1946–47
Offaly	Green, white and gold			
Tipperary	Blue and gold	1961	1961	1960–61
Waterford	White and blue	1959	1959	
Westmeath	Maroon and white			
Wexford	Purple and gold	1960	1960	1957–58

== Results ==
=== Leinster Senior Hurling Championship ===
First round

15 April 1962 First round	Laois	5–8 – 2–1	Offaly	O'Moore Park
	J Conroy 2–0, P Keenan 1–2, D O'Donovan 1–0, P Delaney 1–0, J Rafter 0–3, S Cashin 0–2, J Alley 0–1.		P Molloy 1–0, N Feehan 1–0, B Loughnane 0–1.	Referee: P Johnston (Kilkenny)

Quarter-final

29 April 1962 Quarter-final	Westmeath	4–3 – 4–5	Laois	O'Connor Park
	J Rooney 1–1, P Loughlin 1–1, M Bolger 1–0, N Bruer 1–0.		S Cashin 1–1, O Fennell 1–0, D O'Donovan 1–0, P Delaney 1–0, J Alley 0–1, J Lyons 0–1, J Rafter 0–1, P Dillon 0–1.	Attendance: 2,500; Referee: P Johnston (Kilkenny)

Semi-finals

1 July 1962 Semi-final	Kilkenny	4–16 – 1–10	Dublin	Nowlan Park
	E Keher 1–4, S Clohessy 1–3, B Dwyer 1–3, D Heaslip 1–2, O Gogh 0–4.		A Young 1–1, A Boothman 0–3, L Shannon 0–3, F Whelan 0–1, M Bermingham 0–1, B Boothman 0–1.	Referee: T Coleman

8 July 1962 Semi-final	Wexford	5–14 – 3–6	Laois	Croke Park
	P Kehoe 2–3, Jimmy O'Brien 1–3, N Wheeler 1–1, T Flood 1–1, P Lynch 0–3, W Rackard 0–1, O McGrath 0–1, John Nolan 0–1.		M McDonald 3–1, P Keenan 0–3, J Conroy 0–1, O Fennell 0–1.	Attendance: 9,758; Referee: C Foley

Final

22 July 1962 Final	Wexford	3–9 – 2–10	Kilkenny	Croke Park
	N Wheeler 1–2, P Kehoe 0–5, P Lynch 1–0, O McGrath 1–0, T Flood 0–2.		W Dwyer 1–1, D Heaslip 1–0, E Keher 0–3, O Gough 0–2, W Murphy 0–2, S Clohessy 0–1.	Attendance: 45,303; Referee: J Hatton (Laois)

=== Munster Senior Hurling Championship ===
Quarter-finals

20 May 1962 Quarter-final	Clare	3–00 – 4–11	Waterford	Thurles Sportsfield
	G Ryan 1–0, J Cullinan 1–0, L Danaher 1–0.		J Kiely 2–1, P Grimes 0–6, S Power 1–1, J Barron 1–0, L Guinan 0–2, F Walsh 0–1.	Attendance: 3,000; Referee: G Fitzgerald

27 May 1962 Quarter-final	Limerick	2–13 – 2–7	Galway	Cusack Park
	E Carey 2–1, M Rainsford 0–4, P Hartnett 0–3, O O'Neill 0–2, T McGr.. 0–1, L Hogan 0–1, S Quaid 0–1.		J Gillane 2–0, M Cullinane 0–3, T Sweeney 0–2, J Conroy 0–1, L Salmon 0–1.	Attendance: 12,000; Referee: M Hayes

Semi-finals

1 July 1962 Semi-final	Tipperary	3–12 – 4–9	Limerick	Cork Athletic Grounds
	J Doyle 2–4, D Nealon 1–3, T Moloughney 1–0, L Devaney 0–3, T Ryan 0–1, M Burns 0–1.		PJ Keane 1–2, T McGarry 0–4, E Carey 1–0, P Murphy 1–0, E O'Neill 1–0, M Rainsford 0–1, P Hartnett 0–1, S Quaid 0–1.	Attendance: 21,998; Referee: J Smyth (Clare)

8 July 1962 Semi-final	Cork	1–16 – 4–10	Waterford	Thurles Sportsfield
	P Harte 1–6, C Ring 0–3, T Corbett 0–2, T Kelly 0–2, J Barry 0–1, J Sullivan 0–1, L Dowling 0–1.		P Grimes 1–4, J Kiely 1–1, M Flanelly 1–0, T Cheasty 1–0, J Barron 0–2, F Walsh 0–2, S Power 0–1.	Attendance: 31,705; Referee: G Fitzgerald (Limerick)

22 July 1962 Semi-final replay	Tipperary	5–13 – 2–4	Limerick	Cork Athletic Grounds
	Jimmy Doyle 1–6, T Moloughney 2–1, S Loughlin 1–0, D Nealon 1–0, J McKenna 0–2, T Ryan 0–2, M Burns 0–1, L Devaney 0–1.		T Casey 1–1, P Keane 1–0, P Murphy 0–2, T McGarry 0–1.	Attendance: 24,300; Referee: P Cronin

Final

5 August 1962 Final	Tipperary	5–14 – 2–3	Waterford	Gaelic Grounds
	Jimmy Doyle 1–10, L Devaney 2–1, J McKenna 1–0, S McLoughlin 1–0, T Ryan 0–1, D Nealon 0–1, T Moloughney 0–1.		J Kiley 1–0, J Condon 1–0, P Grimes 0–3.	Attendance: 31,197; Referee: G Fitzgerald (Limerick)

=== All-Ireland Senior Hurling Championship ===
Final

2 September 1962 Final	Tipperary	3–10 – 2–11	Wexford	Croke Park
	S McLoughlin 1–2, Jimmy Doyle 0–4, T Ryan 1–0, D Nealon 0–3, L Connolly 0–1.		N Wheeler 1–1, P Kehoe 0–4, J O'Brien 1–0, P Lynch 0–2, T Flood 0–2, O McGrath 0–1, W Rackard 0–1.	Attendance: 75,039; Referee: J Dowling (Offaly)

== Championship statistics ==
=== Top scorers ===
Top scorers overall

Rank	Player	Club	Tally	Total	Matches	Average
1	Jimmy Doyle	Tipperary	4–24	36	4	9.00
2	Padge Kehoe	Wexford	2–12	18	3	6.00
3	John Kiely	Waterford	4-02	14	3	4.66
4	Ned Wheeler	Wexford	3-04	13	3	4.33
5	Donie Nealon	Tipperary	2-07	13	4	3.25

Top scorers in a single game

Rank	Player	Club	Tally	Total	Opposition
1	Jimmy Doyle	Tipperary	1–10	13	Waterford
2	M. McDonald	Laois	3-01	10	Wexford
2	Jimmy Doyle	Tipperary	2-04	10	Limerick
3	Padge Kehoe	Wexford	2-03	13	Laois
3	Jimmy Doyle	Tipperary	1-06	9	Limerick
3	Patsy Harte	Cork	1-06	9	Waterford
4	John Kiely	Waterford	2-01	7	Clare
4	Eamon Carey	Limerick	2-01	7	Galway
4	Tom Moloughney	Tipperary	2-01	7	Limerick
4	Liam Devaney	Tipperary	2-01	7	Waterford
4	Eddie Keher	Kilkenny	1-04	7	Dublin
4	Phil Grimes	Waterford	1-04	7	Cork

=== Scoring ===
- Widest winning margin: 20 points
  - Tipperary 5–14 – 2–3 Waterford (Munster final, 5 August 1962)
- Most goals in a match: 8
  - Laois 4–5 – 4–3 Westmeath (Leinster quarter-final, 19 April 1962)
  - Wexford 5–14 – 3–6 Laois (Leinster semi-final, 8 July 1962)
- Most points in a match: 26
  - Kilkenny 4–16 – 1–10 Dublin (Leinster semi-final, 1 July 1962)
  - Cork 1–16 – 4–10 Waterford (Munster semi-final, 8 July 1962)
- Most goals by one team in a match: 5
  - Laois 5–8 – 2–1 Offaly (Leinster first round, 15 April 1962)
  - Wexford 5–14 – 3–6 Laois (Leinster semi-final, 8 July 1962)
  - Tipperary 5–13 – 2–4 Limerick (Munster semi-final replay, 22 August 1962)
  - Tipperary 5–14 – 2–3 Waterford (Munster final, 5 August 1962)
- Most goals scored by a losing team: 4
  - Westmeath 4–3 – 4–5 Laois (Leinster quarter-final, 29 April 1962)

=== Miscellaneous ===
- The All-Ireland final between Tipperary and Wexford becomes the first championship game to be broadcast live on Telefís Éireann.

== Broadcasting ==
The following matches were broadcast live on television in Ireland on Telefís Éireann. Commentary was provided by Seán Óg Ó Ceallacháin in English and Micheál Ó Muircheartaigh in Irish.

Round	Telefís Éireann
All-Ireland final	Tipperary vs Wexford

== Sources ==
- Corry, Eoghan, The GAA Book of Lists (Hodder Headline Ireland, 2005).
- Donegan, Des, The Complete Handbook of Gaelic Games (DBA Publications Limited, 2005).
- Sweeney, Éamonn, Munster Hurling Legends (The O'Brien Press, 2002).
