= 1957 Wexford Senior Hurling Championship =

Annual hurling competition season

- Champions: St Aidan's Enniscorthy (7th title)
- Runners-up: Rathnure

The 1957 Wexford Senior Hurling Championship was the 47th completed staging of the Wexford Senior Hurling Championship since its establishment by the Wexford County Board in 1889.

St Aidan's Enniscorthy entered the championship as the defending champions.

The final was played on 22 September 1957 at Wexford Park, between St Aidan's Enniscorthy and Rathnure. St Aidan's Enniscorthy won the match by 5–10 to 2–05 to claim their seventh championship title overall and a second consecutive title.

== Results ==
=== Final ===
22 September 1957 Final	St Aidan's Enniscorthy	5-10 - 2-05	Rathnure	Wexford Park
