= 1958 Wexford Senior Hurling Championship =

Annual hurling competition season

- Champions: St Aidan's Enniscorthy (8th title)
- Runners-up: Geraldine O'Hanrahans

The 1958 Wexford Senior Hurling Championship was the 48th completed staging of the Wexford Senior Hurling Championship since its establishment by the Wexford County Board in 1889.

St Aidan's Enniscorthy entered the championship as the defending champions.

The final was played on 21 September 1958 at Wexford Park, between St Aidan's Enniscorthy and Geraldine O'Hanrahans. St Aidan's Enniscorthy won the match by 3–11 to 2–10 to claim their eighth championship title overall and a third consecutive title.

== Results ==
=== Final ===
21 September 1958 Final	St Aidan's Enniscorthy	3-11 - 2-10	Geraldine O'Hanrahans	Wexford Park
