= Mick Regan =

Irish hurler

Personal information
- Native name: Mícheál Ó Ríogáin (Irish)
- Born: 1931 Cloughduv, County Cork, Ireland
- Died: 8 December 2018 (aged 87) Merrion Road, Dublin, Ireland
- Occupation: Garda Síochána
- Height: 5 ft 11 in (180 cm)

Sport
- Sport: Hurling
- Position: Right wing-forward
Clubs
- Years: Club
- Doneraile; New Ireland
Club titles
- Cork titles: 0
Inter-county
Years	County	Apps (scores)
1955-1959	Cork	8 (1-05)
Inter-county titles
- Munster titles: 1
- All-Irelands: 0
- NHL: 0

Michael Regan (1931 - 8 December 2018) was an Irish hurler who played for club sides Doneraile and New Ireland. He played for the Cork senior hurling team between 1955 and 1959, during which time he usually lined out as a right wing-forward.

== Honours ==
Cork

- Munster Senior Hurling Championship (1): 1956

Munster

- Railway Cup (1): 1958
