= Art Foley =

Wexford hurler (1928–2019)

Personal information
- Native name: Airt Ó Foghlú (Irish)
- Born: 14 December 1928 Enniscorthy, County Wexford, Ireland
- Died: 28 October 2019 (aged 90) Long Island, New York, United States
- Occupation: TWA crew chief
- Height: 5 ft 8 in (173 cm)

Sport
- Sport: Hurling
- Position: Goalkeeper
Club
- Years: Club
- St Aidan's Enniscorthy
Club titles
- Wexford titles: 7
Inter-county
- Years: County
- 1946–1957: Wexford
Inter-county titles
- Leinster titles: 3
- All-Irelands: 2
- NHL: 1

Michael Arthur Foley (14 December 1928 – 28 October 2019) was an Irish hurler who played as a goalkeeper for the Wexford senior team.

Born in Enniscorthy, County Wexford, Foley first arrived on the inter-county scene at the age of seventeen when he first linked up with the Wexford minor team. He joined the senior panel during the 1946–47 league. Foley later became a regular member of the starting fifteen, and won two All-Ireland medals, three Leinster medals and one National Hurling League medal. He was an All-Ireland runner-up on one occasion.

As a member of the Leinster inter-provincial team on a number of occasions, Foley won one Railway Cup medal. At club level he was a seven-time championship medallist with St Aidan's Enniscorthy.

Foley retired from inter-county hurling following the conclusion of the 1957 championship. He died in the United States in October 2019.

== Playing career ==
=== Club ===
Foley played his club hurling with his local St Aidan's Enniscorthy club, with whom he won senior county titles in 1946, 1947, 1952, 1953, 1954 and 1956. His team mates at the club included hurler of the year (and later "team of the century" inductee) Nick O'Donnell.

=== Inter-county ===
==== Beginnings ====
Foley first played for Wexford as a member of the minor team in 1946. After leaving the minor ranks, he was added to the Wexford senior team and made his championship debut in the quarter-finals of the 1947 Leinster Championship in a 3–12 to 2–10 victory over Laois. Bobby Rackard and Padge Kehoe also made their championship debuts in the same game. Foley did not consistently maintain his position in the team however. After Wexford's 6–7 to 3–4 defeat to Galway in the 1950-51 National Hurling League final, Foley was dropped from the starting team and squad for the duration of the 1951 hurling championship. Horeswood's Paddy Shannon, Rathnure's Jim Rackard, and UCD's Ray Brennan were tried as alternative replacements. Wexford went on to make the All-Ireland Final that year, but lost on a scoreline of 7–7 to 3–9 to Tipperary. Foley was then reinstated as first choice goalkeeper in the 1951 Oireachtas Cup Final victory over Kilkenny.

Billy Rackard in his 1996 book 'No Hurling at the Dairy Door' wrote:

"In the league final against Galway, an unfortunate event happened which had an unsettling effect on our team. Our star goalkeeper, Art Foley, appeared to lose his nerve on that occasion, and there were several attempts to find a suitable replacement, one being my brother Jim who played in the Leinster final. Ray Brennan, a Wexford native, was giving outstanding displays in goal for UCD around that time. He was brought in for the All-Ireland semi-final and final. Although Brennan was a fine goalkeeper, too much was expected of him, especially in the final. In retrospect, it was a mistake to drop Foley, a brilliant goalkeeper who later proved his worth in no uncertain fashion."

==== Early career ====
After back-to-back Leinster defeats over the next two years, Wexford faced Dublin in the 1954 decider. A 8–5 to 1–4 victory gave Foley his first Leinster medal. A record crowd of 84,856 attended the subsequent All-Ireland decider on 5 September 1954 with Cork providing the opposition. Wexford had a four-point lead with seventeen minutes left to play, however, history was against Foley's side when Johnny Clifford scored the winning goal for Cork with just four minutes left. A narrow 1–9 to 1–6 victory secured a third successive All-Ireland for Cork.

In 1955, Wexford continued their provincial dominance with Foley collecting a second Leinster medal following a 5–6 to 3–9 defeat of Kilkenny in a replay of the Leinster final. Galway, who had been given a bye to the final without playing a game, provided the opposition in the subsequent All-Ireland final on 4 September 1955. At half-time, Galway led by 2–5 to 2–3 courtesy of two goals from eighteen-year-old Paddy Egan. A goal by Tim Flood nine minutes from the end clinched a 3–13 to 2–8 victory and a first All-Ireland medal for Foley. It was Wexford's first All-Ireland win in forty-five years.

==== All-Ireland-winning save ====
Foley added a National Hurling League medal to his collection in 1956 as Tipperary were beaten by 5–9 to 2–14. The subsequent championship campaign saw Wexford reach the provincial final once again. A narrow 4–8 to 3–10 defeat of Kilkenny gave Foley his third successive Leinster medal. Galway were beaten in the All-Ireland semi-final, allowing Wexford to advance to an All-Ireland final meeting with Cork on 23 September 1956. A key moment in Foley's career came in the dying minutes of that game. With seconds remaining in the final, and Wexford holding onto a two-point lead, the ball broke to Christy Ring and he headed straight for goal with the Wexford back line in pursuit. When he got to the 21-yard line he let off a shot that was set to rattle the back of the net, but the shot was somehow blocked by Foley and then cleared by him too. Ring remarked in an interview many years later; "When I got through I thought I had it, but Foley had other ideas, and fair play to him he made a great save." According to Martin Codd's 2005 book The Way I Saw It, once the sliotar had been cleared, Ring raced in and grabbed Foley by the hair and said "You little black bastard you've beaten us". Foley replied "It's about so and so time someone did" before both men shook hands and Ring congratulated him on his save. Within a minute the ball dropped into Foley again and after it was cleared it made its way up the pitch and was buried in the back of the Cork net by Nicky Rackard giving Wexford a 2–14 to 2–8 victory. It was Foley's second All-Ireland medal.

==== Retirement ====
In 1958, Foley was on a tour with the Wexford team in New York City when he decided to end his inter-county career and stay in the United States.

=== Inter-provincial ===
Foley was selected for the Leinster inter-provincial team as goalkeeper in 1956. A 5–11 to 1–7 victory over Munster gave Foley a Railway Cup medal.

== Honours ==
=== Team ===
St Aidan's

- Wexford Senior Hurling Championship (7): 1946, 1947, 1952, 1953, 1954, 1956, 1957

Wexford

- All-Ireland Senior Hurling Championship (2): 1955, 1956
- Leinster Senior Hurling Championship (3): 1954, 1955, 1956
- National Hurling League (1): 1955–56

Leinster

- Railway Cup (1): 1956
