= 1955 All-Ireland Senior Hurling Championship final =

1955 All-Ireland Senior Hurling Final
- Event: 1955 All-Ireland Senior Hurling Championship
| Wexford | Galway |
| 3–13 | 2–8 |
- Date: 4 September 1955
- Venue: Croke Park, Dublin
- Referee: R. Stakelum (Tipperary)
- Attendance: 72,854

The 1955 All-Ireland Senior Hurling Championship Final was the 68th All-Ireland Final and the culmination of the 1955 All-Ireland Senior Hurling Championship, an inter-county hurling tournament for the top teams in Ireland. The match was held at Croke Park, Dublin, on 4 September 1955, between Wexford and Galway. The Connacht men lost to their Leinster opponents on a score line of 3–13 to 2–8.

== Match details ==
1955-09-04
15:15 IST
Final

| Wexford | 3–13 – 2–8 | Galway |

Croke Park, Dublin
Attendance: 72,854
Referee: R. Stakelum (Tipperary)

| Wexford | Galway |
