= Ned Wheeler =

Irish hurler (1932–2019)

Personal information
- Native name: Éamonn Ó Faoláir (Irish)
- Born: 8 May 1932 Rathdowney, County Laois, Ireland
- Died: 6 June 2019 (aged 87) Waterford, Ireland
- Occupation: Oil salesman
- Height: 6 ft 2 in (188 cm)

Sport
- Sport: Hurling
- Position: Midfield
Clubs
- Years: Club
- St Martin's; Faythe Harriers
Club titles
- Wexford titles: 3
Inter-county*
Years	County	Apps (scores)
1949–1965	Wexford	39 (8–16)
Inter-county titles
- Leinster titles: 7
- All-Irelands: 3
- NHL: 2
- *Inter County team apps and scores correct as of 17:28, 7 June 2019.

Ned Wheeler (8 May 1932 – 6 June 2019) was an Irish hurler who played for Wexford Senior Championship club Faythe Harriers. He played for the Wexford senior hurling team for 16 years, during which time he usually lined out at midfield but was also deployed at full-forward. A master of the overhead stroke, his blonde hair and long, sweeping strides made him a cult hero of Wexford hurling.

Wheeler began his hurling career at club level with St Martin's. At 16 years of age he experienced his first success when the club won the 1948 Wexford Junior Championship title. He later captained the club to the Wexford Minor Championship in 1950. Wheeler later transferred to the Faythe Harriers club, with whom he won Wexford Senior Championship medals in 1960, 1962 and 1965.

At inter-county level, Wheeler joined the Wexford senior team as a 17-year-old in 1949. From his debut, he was ever-present either at half-back, midfield or full-forward and made numerous National League and Championship appearances in a career that ended with his last game in 1965. During that time Wheeler was part of three All-Ireland Championship-winning teams – in 1955, 1956 and 1960. He also secured seven Leinster Championship medals and two National Hurling League medals.

At inter-provincial level, Wheeler was selected to play in several championship campaigns with Leinster, with Railway Cup medals being won in 1954, 1956 and 1964.

== Honours ==
St Martin's

- Wexford Junior Hurling Championship (1): 1948
- Wexford Minor Hurling Championship (1): 1950

Faythe Harriers

- Wexford Senior Hurling Championship (3): 1960, 1962, 1965

Wexford

- All-Ireland Senior Hurling Championship (3): 1955, 1956, 1960
- Leinster Senior Hurling Championship (7): 1951, 1954, 1955, 1956, 1960, 1962, 1965
- National Hurling League (2): 1955–56, 1957–58

Leinster

- Railway Cup (3): 1954, 1956, 1964

Sporting positions
Preceded by Nick O'Donnell	Wexford Senior Hurling Captain; 1961	Succeeded by Billy Rackard
