= 1956 Railway Cup Hurling Championship =

Irish hurling competition

1956 Railway Cup
- Date: 19 February 1956 - 17 March 1956
- Teams: Connacht; Leinster; Munster; Ulster
- Champions: Leinster (7th title); Nick O'Donnell (captain)
- Runners-up: Munster; Dermot Kelly (captain)

Tournament statistics
- Matches played: 3
- Goals scored: 20 (6.67 per match)
- Points scored: 53 (17.67 per match)
- Top scorer(s): Nicky Rackard (3-08)

The 1956 Railway Cup Hurling Championship was the 30th series of the inter-provincial hurling Railway Cup. Three matches were played between 19 February 1956 and 17 March 1956 to decide the title. It was contested by Connacht, Leinster, Munster and Ulster.

Munster entered the championship as the defending champions.

On 17 March 1956, Leinster won the Railway Cup after a 5-11 to 1-07 defeat of Munster in the final at Croke Park, Dublin. It was their seventh Railway Cup title overall and their first title since 1954.

Leinster's Nicky Rackard was the Railway Cup top scorer with 3-08.

== Results ==
Semi-finals

19 February 1956 Semi-final	Ulster	2-06 - 5-13	Munster	Casement Park, Belfast
	D Cormican 1-2, K Armstrong 1-0, R McMullan 0-2, J Gibson 0-1, P Morgan 0-1.		C Ring 2-2, S Power 2-1, J Hartnett 1-0, J Carney 0-3, P Stakelum 0-3, J Smyth 0-2, J O'Connor 0-1, D Kelly 0-1.	Referee: C McLoughlin (Leinster)

26 February 1956 Semi-final	Connacht	2-09 - 5-07	Leinster	Dunlo GAA Grounds, Ballinasloe
	P Egan 1-2, B Conway 1-0, B Duffy 0-3, M Cullinane 0-2, T Kelly 0-1, J Molloy 0-1.		T Flood 2-1, L Cashin 2-0, N Rackard 1-2, S Clohessy 0-3, S Hearne 0-1.	Referee: J Fitzgerald (Limerick)

Final

17 March 1956 Final	Munster	1-07 - 5-11	Leinster	Croke Park, Dublin
	D Kelly 1-1, J Smyth 0-3, C Ring 0-2, S Power 0-1.		N Rackard 2-6, T Flood 1-2, L Cashin 1-1, N Wheeler 1-0, S Clohessy 0-1, McGrath 0-1.	Attendance: 46,278; Referee: J Gallagher (Galway)

== Top scorers ==
Overall

Rank	Player	County	Tally	Total	Matches	Average
1	Nicky Rackard	Leinster	3-08	17	2	8.50
2	Tim Flood	Leinster	3-03	12	2	6.00
3	Liam Cashin	Leinster	3-01	10	2	5.00
3	Christy Ring	Munster	2-04	10	2	5.00

Single game

Rank	Player	County	Tally	Total	Opposition
1	Nicky Rackard	Leinster	2-06	12	Munster
2	Christy Ring	Munster	2-02	8	Ulster
3	Séamus Power	Munster	2-01	7	Ulster
3	Tim Flood	Leinster	2-01	7	Connacht

== Sources ==
- Donegan, Des, The Complete Handbook of Gaelic Games (DBA Publications Limited, 2005).
