= 1952 Wexford Senior Hurling Championship =

Annual hurling competition season

- Champions: St Aidan's Enniscorthy (3rd title)
- Runners-up: Horeswood

The 1952 Wexford Senior Hurling Championship was the 42nd completed staging of the Wexford Senior Hurling Championship since its establishment by the Wexford County Board in 1889.

Cloughbawn entered the championship as the defending champions.

The final was played on 5 October 1952 at O'Kennedy Park in New Ross, between St Aidan's Enniscorthy and Horeswood. St Aidan's Enniscorthy won the match by 2–12 to 0–02 to claim their third championship title overall and a first title in five years.

== Results ==
=== Final ===
7 October 1952 Final	St Aidan's Enniscorthy	2-12 - 0-02	Horeswood	O'Kennedy Park
