= St Aidan's Enniscorthy GAA =

Former GAA club in Enniscorthy, County Wexford, Ireland

St Aidan's
- Naomh Aodán
- Founded: 1938
- County: Wexford
- Grounds: Bellefield Grounds

Senior Club Championships
| | All Ireland | Leinster champions | Wexford champions |
|---|---|---|---|
| Football: | 0 | 0 | 2 |
| Hurling: | 0 | 0 | 9 |

St Aidan's Enniscorthy GAA was a Gaelic Athletic Association club in Enniscorthy, County Wexford, Ireland. The club fielded teams in both hurling and Gaelic football.

== History ==
Located in the town of Enniscorthy, a town dominated by Gaelic football, St Aidan's GAA Club was established in 1938 following a series of meetings between Seán Browne and other like-minded individuals. The club was named St Aidan's, after the patron saint of the Diocese of Ferns. St Aidan's had their first success by winning the Wexford MHC title in 1938.

A number of strides were made in establishing an adult team in the years that followed. St Aidan's won the Wexford JHC title 1945. This was followed by consecutive Wexford SHC titles in 1946 and 1947. St Aidan's also fielded a Gaelic football team and won consecutive Wexford SFC titles in 1950 and 1951. The club went on to dominated club hurling in Wexford for the rest of that decade and won seven Wexford SHC titles in eight years between 1952 and 1959.

St Aidan's went into a period of decline following this successful period. The club merged with Shamrocks, Starlights and Emmetts to create the Rapparees Starlights club in 1972.

== Honours ==
- Wexford Senior Football Championship (2): 1950, 1951
- Wexford Senior Hurling Championship (9): 1946, 1947, 1952, 1953, 1954, 1956, 1957, 1958, 1959
- Wexford Junior Hurling Championship (1): 1945

== Notable players ==
- Tom Dixon: All-Ireland SHC-winner (1956)
- Art Foley: All-Ireland SHC-winner (1955, 1956)
- Padge Kehoe: All-Ireland SHC-winner (1955, 1956, 1960)
- Nick O'Donnell: All-Ireland SHC-winner (1955, 1956, 1960)
