= Tom Dixon (hurler) =

Wexford hurler (1930–2003)

Personal information
- Native name: Tomás Mac Riocaird (Irish)
- Born: 1930 Castlebridge, County Wexford, Ireland
- Died: 9 February 2003 (aged 72) Barntown, County Wexford, Ireland
- Occupation: Administrator / Farmer

Sport
- Sport: Hurling
- Position: Left corner-forward
Club
- Years: Club
- St Aidan's Enniscorthy
Club titles
- Wexford titles: 7
Inter-county
- Years: County
- 1953–1957: Wexford
Inter-county titles
- Leinster titles: 1
- All-Irelands: 1
- NHL: 1

Tom Dixon (1930 – 9 February 2003) was an Irish hurler who played as a left corner-forward for the Wexford senior team.

Dixon made his first appearance for the team during the 1953 championship and was a regular member of the starting fifteen for the next few seasons until his retirement after the 1957 championship. During that time he won one All-Ireland medal, one Leinster medal and one National League medal.

At club level Dixon was a seven-time county championship medalist with St Aidan's Enniscorthy.
