= Padge Kehoe =

Wexford hurler and Gaelic footballer (1925–2007)

Personal information
- Native name: Pádraig Mac Eochaidh (Irish)
- Nickname: Padge
- Born: 27 July 1925 Enniscorthy, County Wexford, Ireland
- Died: 2 February 2007 (aged 81) Enniscorthy, County Wexford, Ireland
- Occupation: Guinness sales rep.
- Height: 5 ft 10 in (178 cm)

Sport
- Sport: Hurling
- Position: Centre-forward
Club
- Years: Club
- St Aidan's Enniscorthy
Club titles
	Football	Hurling
Wexford titles	3	9
Inter-county
- Years: County
- 1944–1964: Wexford
Inter-county titles
- Leinster titles: 6
- All-Irelands: 3
- NHL: 2

Pádraig "Padge" Kehoe (27 July 1925 – 2 February 2007) is a former Irish sportsman. He played hurling with his local club St Aidan's Enniscorthy and with the Wexford senior inter-county team in the 1950s and 1960s.

== Playing career ==
=== Club ===
Kehoe played his club hurling with the St Aidan's Enniscorthy club in Enniscorthy and enjoyed much success. He won his first senior county title in 1946. Incidentally, it was the club's first senior triumph as well. He won a second county title in 1947, before playing a key role in helping the club to capture a three-in-a-row of county victories in 1952, 1953 and 1954. St Aidan's lost their county title in 1955; however, the team bounced back with Kehoe collecting four consecutive county medals in 1956, 1957, 1958 and 1959.

=== Inter-county ===
Kehoe first came to prominence as a member of the Wexford senior inter-county team in the late 1940s, however, it was 1951 before he won his first Leinster title. He subsequently lined out in his first All-Ireland final appearance, however, Tipperary trounced Wexford by ten points to capture a third All-Ireland title in-a-row. Three years later in 1954 Kehoe was captain of the county team as he captured a second Leinster title. Wexford later faced Cork in the All-Ireland final; however, the result was much closer than Wexford's last final appearance. Cork still won the game by three points Cork a third championship title in-a-row and giving Christy Ring a record eighth All-Ireland medal. The following year Kehoe won a third Leinster title. Once again, Wexford lined out in the All-Ireland final with Galway providing the opposition. The men from the West were granted a bye into the final, however, it was Wexford who triumphed by eight points. Kehoe had finally captured an All-Ireland medal. In 1956 Kehoe added a National Hurling League medal to his collection as Wexford were quickly becoming one of the most popular hurling teams in history. A fourth Leinster title was quickly followed by a fourth All-Ireland final appearance. Cork provided the opposition once again in one of the most famous championship deciders ever. Kehoe got Wexford's first goal after just three minutes; however, the game is remembered Art Foley's great save of a Christy Ring shot at goal. The sliothar was quickly scrambled up the field where Nicky Rackard captured a second goal for the Slaneysiders. That save from Foley denied Ring a ninth All-Ireland medal, however, it gave Kehoe a second consecutive winners' medal. Wexford lost their provincial crown in 1957; however, Kehoe won a second National League medal in 1958. Two years later in 1960 he won a fifth Leinster title before lining out in another All-Ireland final. An overconfident Tipperary provided the opposition yet again; however, a goal from a 21-yard free by Kehoe secured the victory for Wexford, giving the Glencarrig man a third All-Ireland medal. In 1962 Kehoe won his sixth and final Leinster title. He later lined out in his final Croke Park appearance in the All-Ireland final as old rivals Tipperary provided the opposition. It was not to be Wexford's day, as Tipp won on a score line of 3–10 to 2–11. Kehoe retired from inter-county hurling following that defeat.

Kehoe also played with the Wexford Gaelic football team as well in the 1950s. He had little success in this code, however; his most famous moment as a footballer came when he scored a goal to famously put Dublin out of the Leinster Championship.

=== Provincial ===
Kehoe also lined out with Leinster in the Railway Cup inter-provincial competition. In an era when Munster dominated the competition Kehoe never captured a winners' medal.

== Post-playing career ==
In retirement Kehoe remained heavily involved in Wexford hurling. He coached the Wexford team that defeated old rivals Tipperary to capture the All-Ireland title in 1968. It was Wexford's fifth All-Ireland title ever and Kehoe has the remarkable record of being involved in five of those victories.

He was married and had two children: Niall, Brian, as well as having two sisters Kitty and Mary.

Preceded by	Wexford Senior Hurling Captain; 1954	Succeeded by Nick O'Donnell
