= 1954 Wexford Senior Hurling Championship =

Annual hurling competition season

- Champions: St Aidan's Enniscorthy (5th title)
- Runners-up: Horeswood

The 1954 Wexford Senior Hurling Championship was the 44th completed staging of the Wexford Senior Hurling Championship since its establishment by the Wexford County Board in 1889.

St Aidan's Enniscorthy entered the championship as the defending champions.

The final was played on 28 November 1954 at O'Kennedy Park in New Ross, between St Aidan's Enniscorthy and Horeswood. St Aidan's Enniscorthy won the match by 5–05 to 0–05 to claim their fifth championship title overall and a third consecutive title.

== Results ==
=== Final ===
28 November 1954 Final	St Aidan's Enniscorthy	5-05 - 0-05	Horeswood	O'Kennedy Park
