= Tim Flood (hurler) =

Wexford hurler (1927–2014)

Personal information
- Native name: Tadhg Ó Maoltuile (Irish)
- Born: 8 January 1927 Clonroche, County Wexford, Ireland
- Died: 3 July 2014 (aged 87) Newtown Road, Wexford, Ireland
- Occupation: Farmer

Sport
- Sport: Hurling
- Position: Left corner-forward
Club
- Years: Club
- 1945–1969: Cloughbawn
Club titles
- Wexford titles: 2
Inter-county*
Years	County	Apps (scores)
1947–1962	Wexford	38 (26–59)
Inter-county titles
- Leinster titles: 6
- All-Irelands: 3
- NHL: 2
- *Inter County team apps and scores correct as of 13:54, 4 July 2014.

Timothy Flood (8 January 1927 – 3 July 2014) was an Irish hurler who played as a left corner-forward for the Wexford senior team.

Born in Clonroche, County Wexford, Flood first arrived on the inter-county scene at the age of twenty two when he first linked up with the Wexford senior team. He made his senior debut in the 1947–48 National Hurling League. Flood went on to win three All-Ireland medals, six Leinster medals and two National Hurling League medals. He was an All-Ireland runner-up on three occasions.

As a member of the Leinster inter-provincial team on a number of occasions, Flood won two Railway Cup medals in 1954 and 1956. At club level he won three championship medals with Cloughbawn.

Flood's career tally of 26 goals and 59 points marks him out as Wexford's fourth highest championship scorer of all-time.

Throughout his inter-county career, Flood made 38 championship appearances for Wexford. His retirement came following the conclusion of the 1962 championship.

His brother-in-law, Oliver "Hopper" McGrath, and his son, Seán Flood, also enjoyed All-Ireland success with Wexford.

In retirement from playing Flood became involved in team management and coaching. He served as coach of the Cloughbawn junior hurling team before later serving as a selector.

Flood is regarded as 'one of the greatest hurlers of his era' and has been voted onto teams made up of the sport's greats, including at left corner-forward on a 'specially-chosen greatest ever Wexford side in 2002.'

== Playing career ==
=== Club ===
Flood played his club hurling with Cloughbawn and, after playing just two minor championship games, joined the club's junior team in 1946, winning a junior championship medal that same year.

In 1949 Flood was a key member of the club's senior team, as Cloughbawn reached the final of the senior championship for the first time ever. A defeat of reigning champions Rathnure gave him his first championship medal.

Cloughbawn surrendered their championship title in 1950, however, the team reached the decider again in 1951. A 1–13 to 3–7 draw with Horsewood necessitated a replay. Flood scored 2–4 in that game and collected a second championship medal as Cloughbawn triumphed by 3–7 to 1–9.

=== Inter-county ===
Flood made his senior debut for Wexford on 26 October 1947 in a 7–4 to 4–11 defeat by Dublin in the opening round of the 1947-46 National League. It would be another two years before he was picked again for league action, however, after an impressive display against Tipperary he became a regular member of the starting fifteen.

After losing the provincial final to Kilkenny in 1950, Flood was at left corner-forward the following year as Wexford faced Laois in the Leinster decider. A 3–12 to 4–3 victory gave him his first Leinster medal as Wexford claimed the provincial crown for the first time since 1918. The subsequent All-Ireland decider on 2 September 1951 saw three-in-a-row hopefuls Tipperary providing the opposition. Nicky Rackard's goal-scoring ability was quelled by Tipperary goalkeeper Tony Reddin, while Séamus Bannon, Tim Ryan and Paddy Kenny scored key goals which powered Tipp to a 7–7 to 3–9 victory.

After back to back Leinster defeats over the next two years, Wexford faced Dublin in the 1954 decider. A huge 8–5 to 1–4 victory gave Flood his second Leinster medal. A record crowd of 84,856 attended the subsequent All-Ireland decider on 5 September 1954 with Cork providing the opposition. Wexford had a four-point lead with seventeen minutes left to play, however, history was against Flood's side when Johnny Clifford scored the winning goal for Cork with just four minutes left. A narrow 1–9 to 1–6 victory secured a third successive All-Ireland for Cork.

In 1955 Wexford continued their provincial dominance with Flood collecting a third Leinster medal following a 5–6 to 3–9 defeat of Kilkenny in a replay of the Leinster final. Galway, who had been given a bye to the final without ever playing a game, provided the opposition in the subsequent All-Ireland final on 4 September 1955. At half-time the men from the west led by 2–5 to 2–3 courtesy of two goals from eighteen-year-old schoolboy Paddy Egan. A goals by Flood nine minutes from the end clinched a 3–13 to 2–8 victory and a first All-Ireland medal. It was Wexford's first All-Ireland triumph in forty-five years.

Flood added a National Hurling League medal to his collection in 1956 as Tipperary were bested by 5–9 to 2–14. The subsequent championship campaign saw Wexford reach the provincial final once again. A narrow 4–8 to 3–10 defeat of Kilkenny gave Flood his fourth Leinster medal. Galway fell heavily in the All-Ireland semi-final, allowing Wexford to advance to an All-Ireland final meeting with Cork on 23 September 1956. The game has gone down in history as one of the all-time classics as Christy Ring was bidding for a record ninth All-Ireland medal. The game turned on one important incident as the Wexford goalkeeper, Art Foley, made a miraculous save from a Ring shot and cleared the sliotar up the field to set up another attack. Nicky Rackard scored a crucial goal with two minutes to go giving Wexford a 2–14 to 2–8 victory.

Two year later in 1958 Flood added a second National League medal to his collection following a 5–7 to 4–8 defeat of Limerick.

In 1960 Wexford were back in the provincial decider. A narrow 3–10 to 2–11 defeat of Kilkenny gave Flood his fifth Leinster medal. The All-Ireland decider on 4 September 1960 saw red-hot favourites Tipperary provide the opposition. The game ended in remarkable circumstances as the crowd invaded the pitch with a minute to go, mistaking the referee's whistle for the end of the game. When the crowd were finally moved off the pitch Tipperary continued playing with only twelve men. Goals by Padge Kehoe and Oliver "Hopper" McGrath gave Wexford a merited 2–15 to 0–11 victory. It was Flood's third All-Ireland medal.

After surrendering their titles the following year, Wexford were back in 1962. Another narrow 3–9 to 2–10 defeat of Kilkenny gave Flood a sixth Leinster medal. The All-Ireland final on 2 September 1962 was a repeat of 1960 with Tipp, the reigning champions, lining out in opposition. Wexford got off to a disastrous start when Tom Moloughney and Seán McLoughlin scored goals for Tipperary inside the first minute. Wexford fought back, however, Flood's side were bested on a 3–10 to 2–11 score line. This defeat brought the curtain down on Flood's inter-county career.

=== Inter-provincial ===
Flood was selected for the Leinster inter-provincial team in 1951, however, arch rivals Munster dominated the competition at the time.

In 1954 Flood won his first Railway Cup medal as Leinster broke back after thirteen years in the wilderness and defeated Munster by 0–9 to 0–5.

Two years later in 1956, Leinster enjoyed one of their biggest ever defeats of Munster. A 5–11 to 1–7 victory gave Flood a second Railway Cup medal.

== Coaching career ==
After Flood drew a close to his twenty-five-year club career, he quickly became involved in coaching. He was appointed coach of the Cloughbawn hurling team before later serving as a selector. He enjoyed little success during either tenure.

== Sheepdog trials ==
After finishing with hurling, Flood was heavily involved in sheepdog trials, and represented Cloughbawn, Wexford, Leinster and Ireland on numerous occasions. He competed in his first national trial in 1970 and made his debut on the Irish team in 1972. He and a collie called Cosy won the national title in 1975, the first of his twelve All-Ireland titles. Six of the dozen were in the singles event, while six were doubles, working with a brace of dogs. Flood also made several appearances on the BBC's One Man and His Dog.

== Personal life ==
Married to Kathleen McGrath, a sister of his Wexford team mate Oliver "Hopper" McGrath, the couple had four children – Séamus, Norma, Sean and Garry. Flood was a farmer all his life, until an outbreak of BSE destroyed his herd in 2002. He also played music all his life and was the mainstay of the Castleboro Céili Band.

Flood died at the Farnogue Residential Health Care Unit at Wexford General Hospital on 3 July 2014.

== Honours ==
=== Team ===
Cloughbawn

- Wexford Senior Hurling Championship (2): 1949, 1951
- Wexford Junior Hurling Championship (1): 1946

Wexford

- All-Ireland Senior Hurling Championship (3): 1955, 1956, 1960
- Leinster Senior Hurling Championship (6): 1951, 1954, 1955, 1956, 1960, 1962
- National Hurling League (2): 1955–56, 1957–58

Leinster

- Railway Cup (2): 1954, 1956
