= Rathnure GAA =

Gaelic sports club in County Wexford, Ireland

Rathnure St Anne's
- Ráth an Iúir
- Founded: 1931
- County: Wexford
- Colours
- Grounds: Nicky Rackard Park
- Coordinates: 52°29′52″N 6°45′57″W

Playing kits
Standard colours

Senior Club Championships
	All Ireland	Leinster champions	Wexford champions
Football:	0	0	1
Hurling:	0	6	20
Camogie:	1	4	-

Rathnure St Anne's GAA is a Gaelic Athletic Association club located in Rathnure, County Wexford, Ireland. The club is affiliated to the Wexford County Board and fields teams in hurling, Gaelic football and camogie.

== History ==
Located in the village of Rathnure, about 12 km from Enniscorthy, Rathnure St Anne's GAA Club was founded in 1931. The club spent its formative years operating in the junior grade and had its first major success in 1940, when the Wexford JHC title was won with a team featuring an 18-year-old Nicky Rackard. This success also secured senior status for the club.

Rathnure won its first Wexford SHC title in 1948, following a 3–05 to 0–02 win over St Aidan's Enniscorthy in the final. This was the first of a record 20 Wexford SHC titles for the club. Rathnure dominated at county and provincial levels throughout the 1970s, when six Wexford SHC titles were subsequently converted into three Leinster Club SHC titles between 1971 and 1977. In spite of this, the club faced All-Ireland Club SHC final defeats by Blackrock (1972 and 1974) and St Finbarr's (1978).

Rathnure had further Leinster Club SHC title wins in 1986, 1987 and 1998, however, the All-Ireland Club SHC title eluded the club on each of those occasions. A camogie section was established in 1968 and won four Leinster Club SCC titles between 1992 and 2000. The high point for this team came with the winning of the All-Ireland Club SCC in 1995, following a 4–09 to 1–05 win over Toomevara in the final.

The 21st century saw the club win its 20th Wexford SHC title in 2006, however, the club went into a period of decline after achieving this record. It remains their last title success. In August 2023, the club's 82-year tenure in the Wexford SHC ended when they were relegated after losing a playoff to Oylegate–Glenbrien. Rathnure returned to the top tier after winning the Wexford IHC and Leinster Club IHC titles in 2024.

== Grounds ==
Rathnure's home ground is Nicky Rackard Park. It is named in honour of Nicky Rackard (1922–1976), a Rathnure clubman who is regarded as Wexford's greatest ever hurler. The official opening took place on 13 August 1982.

== Honours ==
- All-Ireland Senior Club Camogie Championship (1): 1995
- Leinster Senior Club Camogie Championship (4): 1992, 1995, 1996, 2000
- Leinster Senior Club Hurling Championship (6): 1971, 1973, 1977, 1986, 1987, 1998
- Wexford Senior Hurling Championship (20): 1948, 1950, 1955, 1961, 1967, 1971, 1972, 1973, 1974, 1977, 1979, 1980, 1986, 1987, 1990, 1996, 1998, 2002, 2003, 2006
- Wexford Senior Football Championship (1): 1952
- Leinster Intermediate Club Hurling Championship (1): 2024
- Wexford Intermediate Hurling Championship (2): 1971, 2024
- Wexford Junior Hurling Championship (4): 1940, 1981, 1983, 2018
- Wexford Junior Football Championship (1): 1950
- Wexford Under-21 Hurling Championship (11): 1970 (with Duffry Rovers), 1971 (with Duffry Rovers), 1983 (with Cushinstown), 1991, 1995, 1996, 1997, 1998, 1999, 2000, 2016, 2025
- Wexford Minor Hurling Championship (14): 1941, 1942, 1945, 1963, 1964, 1973 (with Duffry Rovers), 1980 (with Cushinstown), 1983 (with Cushinstown), 1992, 1993, 1994, 1996, 1997, 2001, 2013, 2023

== Notable players ==
- Jim English: All-Ireland SHC-winner (1955, 1956 (c), 1960)
- Rod Guiney: All-Ireland SHC-winner (1996)
- Dan Quigley: All-Ireland SHC-winner (1968 (c))
- Nicky Rackard: All-Ireland SHC-winner (1955, 1956)
