= Nicky Rackard =

Irish hurler and Gaelic footballer (1922–1976)

Nickey Rackard

Personal information
- Native name: Nioclás Mac Riocaird (Irish)
- Born: 28 April 1922 Killane, County Wexford, Ireland
- Died: 10 April 1976 (aged 53) Elm Park, Dublin, Ireland
- Occupation: Veterinary surgeon
- Height: 6 ft 6 in (198 cm)

Sport
- Football Position: Full-forward
- Hurling Position: Full-forward
Clubs
- Years: Club
- St Anne's Rathangan/Clearistown; Rathnure
Club titles
	Football	Hurling
Wexford titles	0	4
Inter-county*
Years	County	Apps (scores)
1942–1957	Wexford	36 (59–96)
Inter-county titles
	Football	Hurling
Leinster Titles	1	4
All-Ireland Titles	0	2
League titles	0	1
- *Inter County team apps and scores correct as of (12:56, 19 September 2006 (UTC)).

Nicholas Rackard (28 April 1922 – 10 April 1976) was an Irish hurler whose league and championship career with the Wexford senior team spanned seventeen years from 1940 to 1957. He established many championship scoring records, including being the top championship goal-scorer of all time with 59 goals. Rackard is widely regarded as one of the greatest hurlers in the history of the game.

Born in Killane, County Wexford, Rackard was introduced to sport by his father who had hoped he would become a cricketer. His uncle, John Doran, won an All-Ireland medal as a Gaelic footballer with Wexford in 1918 and it was hurling and Gaelic football that Rackard developed a talent for.

Rackard played competitive hurling as a boarder at St. Kieran's College in Kilkenny. Here he won back-to-back Leinster medals in 1938 and 1939, however, an All-Ireland medal remained elusive. By this stage Rackard had started playing for the local Rathnure St. Anne's club, winning a county junior championship medal in 1940. As a member of the club's senior team, he won four county senior championship medals.

Rackard made his debut on the inter-county scene when he was selected for the Wexford minor panel. He was just out of the minor grade when he was selected for the Wexford senior team in 1940. Over the course of the next seventeen years, Rackard won two All-Ireland medals as part of the Wexford hurling breakthrough in 1955 and 1956. He also won four Leinster medals, one National Hurling League medal and one Leinster medal as a Gaelic footballer. He played his last game for Wexford in August 1957.

By the late 1940s, Rackard was a regular in the full-forward line on the Leinster inter-provincial team. Success came in the twilight of his career and he claimed his sole Railway Cup medal in 1956.

Rackard's brothers, Billy and Bobby, also experienced All-Ireland success with Wexford.

In retirement from playing Rackard became involved in team management and coaching. It was with the Wexford senior team that he enjoyed his greatest successes as a selector when, in 1968, he helped the team secure the All-Ireland title.

Rackard was most famous for his scoring prowess and was the all-time top championship scorer at the time of his retirement from hurling. His private life was marred by periods of excessive drinking, which had started during his university studies, and eventually developed into alcoholism. After quitting drinking completely in 1970, Rackard travelled the country as a counsellor with Alcoholics Anonymous. In an interview in the Irish Press in 1975, he detailed his life as a recovering alcoholic and became one of the first sportspeople to break the taboo of alcoholism in Ireland. Rackard's death from cancer in April 1976 saw a huge outpouring of grief amongst the hurling community. He was posthumously honoured by being named on the Hurling Team of the Century in 1984, however, he was sensationally omitted from the Hurling Team of the Millennium in favour of Ray Cummins.

== Early life ==
Nickey Rackard was born in Killanne, County Wexford in 1922. The eldest son in a family of five boys and four girls. His parents were Robert (Bob) Rackard and Anastasia Doran, who had been married in 1918. He was born into a family that was mildly interested in sport. His granduncle had played with the famous Wexford football team that captured four All-Ireland titles in-a-row between 1915 and 1918. Rackard's father Bob had planned that his son would play cricket, however, young Rackard was much more interested in Gaelic games. He was educated locally and later attended St. Kierans College, Kilkenny, a virtual academy for young hurling talent. Rackard later attended University College Dublin where he studied to be a veterinary surgeon. In all, his studies took eight years to complete because of his huge commitment to his sporting exploits.

== Playing career ==
=== Club ===
Rackard played his club hurling with his local Rathnure club and enjoyed much success. He won his first senior county title in 1948. It was Rathnure's first-ever championship triumph. Two years later in 1950, Rackard captured a second county title, a victory which allowed him to take over the captaincy of the county senior team for the following year. He won his third and final county medal in 1955.

=== Inter-county ===
Rackard's early successes on the inter-county scene were as a footballer with the Wexford team with whom he won a Leinster Senior Football Championship title in 1945. At the time the county's hurling team was in the doldrums, however, things were about to change. Rackard made his debut for the county team in 1940 and spent much of the decade at midfield. By the start of the 1950s, he had moved into the forward lines and it was here that he captured his first Leinster title in 1951. Wexford later faced Tipperary in the All-Ireland final, a team that was attempting to capture a third championship title in a row. The game itself saw Rackard give a remarkable display of hurling artistry; however, Tipp's forward line ran riot and scored seven goals. The final score of 7–7 to 3–9 tells its own story.

Wexford lost their Leinster crown in 1952, however, two years later in 1954 Wexford regained the title following a huge victory over Dublin. That game saw Rackard score a grand total of five goals and five points from Wexford's tally of 8–5. The subsequent All-Ireland semi-final saw Wexford face Antrim. Once again, Rackard ran riot in the forward line and amassed a personal tally of seven goals and seven points. A 12–17 to 2–3 victory gave Wexford an easy passage to the championship decider where they faced Cork. On this occasion 'the Rebels' were attempting to capture a third All-Ireland title on the trot and a record crowd turned out in Croke Park to see Rackard and Christy Ring do battle. In the end, it was Johnny Clifford who turned out to be the hero as Cork won the day on a score line of 1–9 to 1–6.

In 1955 Rackard won his third Leinster title, however, an All-Ireland medal still eluded his collection. Wexford later defeated Limerick in the All-Ireland semi-final before later facing Galway in the championship decider. At half-time the men from the West led by 2–5 to 2–3, however, a Tim Flood goal nine minutes from full-time gave Wexford a deserved 3–13 to 2–8 win. It was the county's first championship title since 1910 and it was Rackard's first All-Ireland medal. In 1956 Wexford captured their first National Hurling League title and breezed through the provincial championship once again with Rackard collecting his fourth Leinster title. The subsequent All-Ireland final saw Wexford aiming to retain their title and gain revenge over Cork for the defeat in 1954. The game has gone down in history as one of the all-time classics as Christy Ring was bidding for a ninth All-Ireland medal. The game turned on one important incident as the Wexford goalkeeper, Art Foley, made a miraculous save from a Ring shot and cleared the sliothar up the field to set up another attack. Rackard scored a crucial goal with two minutes to go giving Wexford a 2–14 to 2–8 victory. In spite of Cork's loss Wexford's Nick O'Donnell and Bobby Rackard, in an unparalleled display of sportsmanship in any game, raised Christy Ring onto their shoulders and carried him off the field. Wexford had won the game but there was no doubt in their minds that the real hero was Ring. After defeat in the Leinster final of 1957 Nicky Rackard decided to retire from inter-county hurling.

=== Inter-provincial ===
By the late 1940s, Rackard had become a key feature on the Leinster team that participated in the annual Railway Cup inter-provincial series. Munster dominated the competition at this time; however, he captured his sole Railway Cup title in 1956.

== Career statistics ==
=== Inter-county ===
Team	Year	National League			Leinster		All-Ireland		Total	
Team	Year	Division	Apps	Score	Apps	Score	Apps	Score	Apps	Score
Wexford	1942–43	Division 1	0	0-00	0	0-00	—		0	0-00
Wexford	1943–44	Division 1	0	0-00	0	0-00	0	0-00	0	2–00
Wexford	1944–45	Division 1	—		0	0–00	0	0–00	0	0–00
Wexford	1945–46	Division 1	—		0	0-00	0	0-00	0	0-00
Wexford	1946–47	Division 1	—		0	0-00	0	0-00	0	0-00
Wexford	1947–48	Division 1	—		0	0-00	—		0	4-03
Wexford	1948–49	Division 1	0	0–00	0	0–00	0	0-00	0	0–00
Wexford	1949–50	Division 1	0	0-00	0	0–00	0	0-00	0	5–07
Wexford	1950–51	Division 1	0	0–00	0	0-00	—		0	9–18
Wexford	1951–52	Division 1	0	0–00	0	0-00	—		0	2–04
Wexford	1952–53	Division 1	0	0-00	0	0-00	—		0	3–03
Wexford	1953–54	Division 1	0	0-00	0	0-00	—		0	12–19
Wexford	1954–55	Division 1	0	0-00	0	0-00	0	0-00	0	7–10
Wexford	1955–56	Division 1	0	0–00	0	0–00	0	0-00	0	12–15
Wexford	1956–57	Division 1	0	0–00	0	0-00	0	0-00	0	2–04
Career total			65	92–123	00	00–000	36	60-96	101	152–219

=== Inter-provincial ===
Team	Year	Railway Cup	
Team	Year	Apps	Score
Leinster	1944	1	0-01
Leinster	1945	1	0-00
Leinster	1946	1	0-00
Leinster	1947	1	1-01
Leinster	1948	2	2-02
Leinster	1949	1	0-00
Leinster	1950	1	0-01
Leinster	1951	2	3-02
Leinster	1952	1	1-01
Leinster	1953	2	2-01
Leinster	1954	0	0-00
Leinster	1955	0	0-00
Leinster	1956	2	3-08
Leinster	1957	2	1-01
Total		17	13-18

Championship scores

- 1940 - N/A
- 1941 - N/A
- 1942 - N/A
- 1943 - N/A
- 1944 - 2-00*
- 1945 - 2-03 (Wexford Football)
- 1946 - 0-00
- 1947 - 0-00
- 1948 - 4-03
- 1949 - 0-00
- 1950 - 5-07
- 1951 - 9-18
- 1952 - 2-04
- 1953 - 3-03
- 1954 - 12-19
- 1955 - 7-10
- 1956 - 12-15
- 1957 - 2-04

== Post-playing career ==
Rackard's personal life away from the hurling pitch was a deeply troubled one, marred by excessive drinking. His problems with alcohol began while he was studying to be a veterinary surgeon in Dublin. In 1951 he suddenly gave up alcohol in a pledge not to drink again after a friend, who was a priest, died. When Wexford celebrated All-Ireland success in 1955 and 1956 Rackard was a teetotaller. During a visit to New York in 1957, however, Rackard began drinking again and the habit grew progressively worse over the next 12 years. In 1965, then a serious alcoholic, he had his first period of hospitalisation to treat the illness. At that stage he was drinking daily, however, the treatment didn't work. He finally quit by 1970 after joining Alcoholics Anonymous. When Rackard quit drinking for the final time he was practically broke. He pieced his life together again, rebuilt his veterinary practice and indulged his passion for horses, enjoying wins in point-to-points and other major race events.

With the AA he travelled the country helping people who were troubled by alcohol. In February 1974 Rackard noticed strange lumps on his neck which he had later removed. Later that year he was told he needed another operation and was said to be making good progress. In 1975 he spoke out in the Irish Press newspaper about his alcoholism, becoming one of the first people to break the taboo of alcoholism in Ireland. Shortly after this, it was revealed that the cancer that had previously troubled him had unfortunately not been completely annihilated and had returned. Rackard died at St. Vincent's Hospital in Dublin in 1976 and was universally mourned by the GAA community throughout Ireland.

== Recognition ==
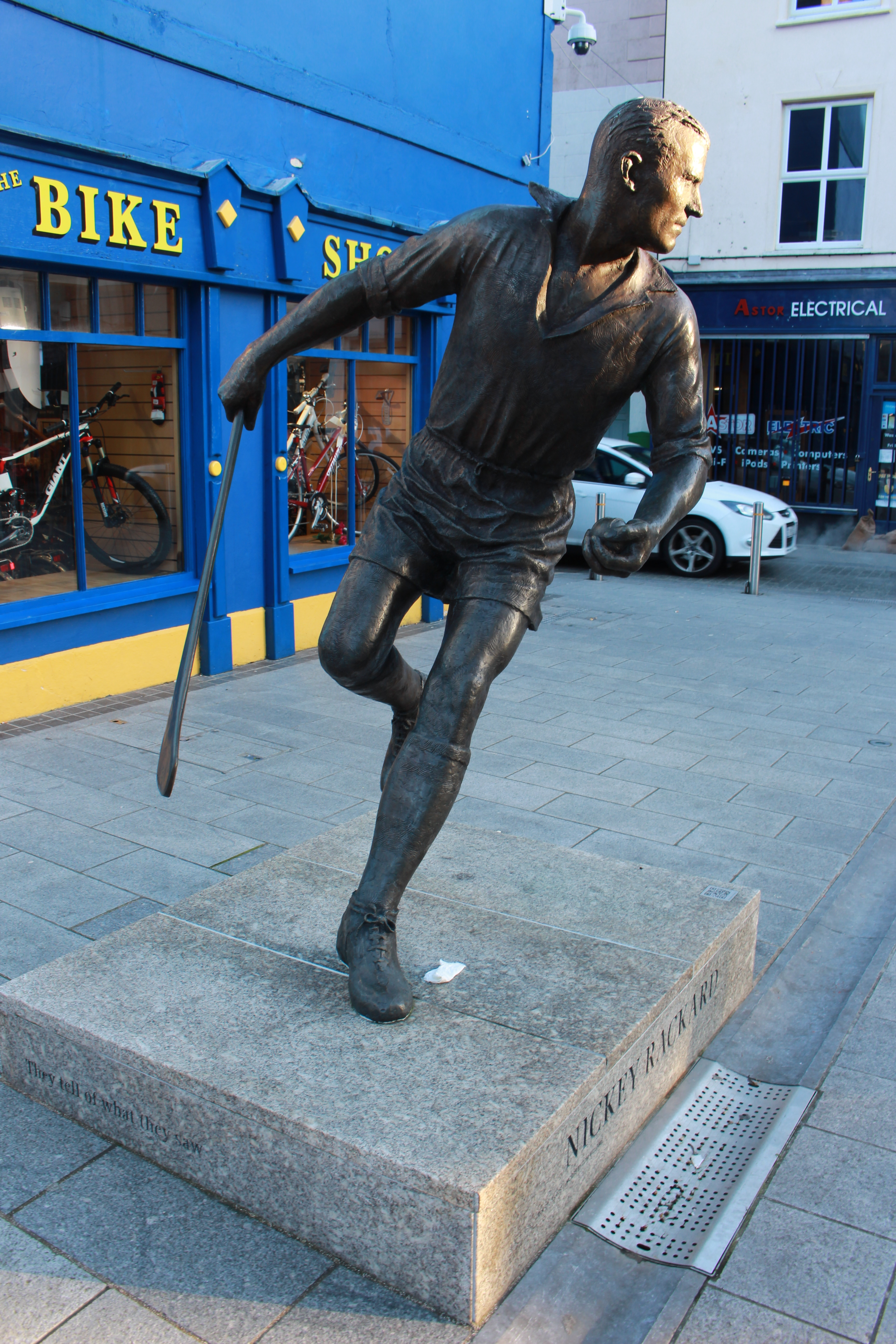
Statue of Rackard in Wexford

Nickey Rackard is generally regarded as perhaps one of the greatest hurlers of all time. He was personally honoured by being posthumously named on the Hurling Team of the Century in 1984. He was not named on the Hurling Team of the Millennium in 2000, with the full-forward position going to Cork's Ray Cummins. His scoring prowess has also earned Rackard a place on the top ten list of all-time scoring greats. In 2005 the GAA further honoured Rackard by naming the Nicky Rackard Cup, the hurling competition for Division 3 teams, in his honour.

In 2006, author Tom Williams wrote a biography of Rackard entitled Cuchulainn's Son – The Story of Nickey Rackard. The same author also penned a now well-known song about Rackard many years earlier, also titled "Cuchulainn's Son" and has been recorded by various artists over the last 20 years and is a lament for the sportsman.

A statue of Rackard was erected in Wexford in 2012.

== Honours ==
Rathnure

- Wexford Senior Hurling Championship (3): 1948, 1950, 1955

Wexford

- All-Ireland Senior Hurling Championship (2): 1955, 1956
- Leinster Senior Hurling Championship (4): 1951, 1954, 1955, 1956
- Leinster Senior Football Championship (1): 1945
- National Hurling League (1): 1955–56

Leinster

- Railway Cup (2): 1954, 1956

== Sources ==
- Colm Keane, Hurling's Top 20. Mainstream Publishing, 2002.
- Billy Rackard, No Hurling at the Dairy Door. Dublin: Blackwater Press, 1996. ISBN 0-86121-893-0.

Sporting positions
Preceded by	Wexford Senior Hurling Captain; 1951	Succeeded by
