= 1955 All-Ireland Senior Hurling Championship =

1954 All-Ireland Senior Hurling Championship
Championship details
- Dates: 24 April – 4 September 1954
- Teams: 14

All-Ireland champions
- Winning team: Wexford (2nd win)
- Captain: Nick O'Donnell

All-Ireland Finalists
- Losing team: Galway
- Captain: Jimmy Duggan

Provincial champions
- Munster: Limerick
- Leinster: Wexford
- Ulster: Not Played
- Connacht: Not Played

Championship statistics
- No. matches played: 14
- Top Scorer: Nicky Rackard (7–10)
- All-Star Team: See here

The 1955 All-Ireland Senior Hurling Championship was the 69th staging of the All-Ireland hurling championship since its establishment by the Gaelic Athletic Association in 1887. The championship began on 24 April 1955 and ended on 4 September 1955.

Cork were the defending champions, however, they were defeated in the provincial series. Wexford won the title following a 3–13 to 2–8 defeat of Galway in the final.

== Teams ==
A total of fourteen teams contested the championship, the same as the previous championship, however, there were some changes on personnel. Antrim withdrew from the senior championship, while Wicklow fielded a team in the Leinster Senior Hurling Championship.

=== Team summaries ===
Team	Colours	Most recent success		
Team	Colours	All-Ireland	Provincial	League
Clare	Saffron and blue	1914	1932	1945–46
Cork	Red and white	1954	1954	1952–53
Dublin	Blue and navy	1938	1952	1938–39
Galway	Maroon and white	1923		1950–51
Kilkenny	Black and amber	1947	1953	1932–33
Laois	Blue and white	1915	1949	
Limerick	Green and white	1940	1940	1946–47
Meath	Green and gold			
Offaly	Green, white and gold			
Tipperary	Blue and gold	1951	1951	1954–55
Waterford	White and blue	1948	1948	
Westmeath	Maroon and white			
Wexford	Purple and gold	1910	1954	
Wicklow	Blue and gold			

== Provincial championships ==
=== Leinster Senior Hurling Championship ===
First round

24 April 1955 First round	Meath	2–06 – 2–02	Wicklow	Parnell Park, Dublin
				Referee: M Leahy

24 April 1955 First round	Westmeath	2–11 – 2–03	Offaly	Cusack Park, Mullingar
	J McGrath 0–6, J Daly 1–2, D O'Callaghan 1–1, J Carey 0–2,		M Connors 1–0, T Errity 1–0, J Spain 0–1, M Mullins 0–1, W Nevin 0–1.	Referee: J Conroy (Laois)

Second round

15 May 1955 Second round	Kilkenny	7–10 – 3–06	Meath	O'Moore Park, Portlaoise
	S Clohessy 2–4, S O'Brien 2–1, P Fitzgerald 2–0, R Carroll 0–5, W Walshe 1–1.		F Foran 1–2, F Kelly 1–1, B Smyth 1–0, M Kane 0–2, F O'Brien 0–1.	Attendance: 3,000; Referee: P Lalor (Laois)

22 May 1955 Second round	Westmeath	4–08 – 2–03	Laois	O'Connor Park, Tullamore
	T Walsh 1–2, D O'Callaghan 1–1, P Maxwell 1–1, F Smyth 1–0, J McGrath 0–3, R McMahon 0–1.		P Hogan 1–2, P Lalor 1–0, M Byrne 0–1.	Referee: P Connell

Semi-finals

26 June 1955 Semi-final	Kilkenny	4–15 – 5–08	Dublin	Croke Park, Dublin
	D Rockett 3–0, R Carroll 0–8, S Clohessy 1–3, J Sutton 0–2, M Kelly 0–1, J Murphy 0–1.		T Maher 1–3, N Allen 1–1, V Bell 1–1, P Shanahan 1–0, M Ryan 1–0, C Murphy 0–3.	Attendance: 36,367; Referee: M Spain (Offaly)

26 June 1955 Semi-final	Wexford	5–09 – 3–04	Westmeath	Croke Park, Dublin
	T Flood 3–1, N Rackard 2–2, N Wheeler 0–3, H Connors 0–3.		D Callaghan 2–0, B McMahon 1–1, J McGrath 0–3.	Attendance: 36,367; Referee: J Mulcahy (Kilkenny)

Finals

17 July 1955 Final	Wexford	2–07 – 2–07	Kilkenny	Croke Park, Dublin
	T Flood 1–3, N Rackard 1–1, Padge Kehoe 0–2, N Wheeler 0–1.		S Clohessy 1–1, R Carroll 0–4, M Kelly 1–0, D Rockett 0–1, J Murphy 0–1.	Attendance: 41,226; Referee: C Mcloughlin (Dublin)

31 July 1955 Final replay	Wexford	5–06 – 3–09	Kilkenny	Croke Park, Dublin
	N Rackard 3–0, O Gough 1–1, T Ryan 1–0, T Flood 0–3, Padge Kehoe 0–2.		S Clohessy 1–2, D Rockett 1–1, Murphy 1–0, S O'Brien 0–3, R Carroll 0–2, J Sutton 0–1.	Attendance: 37,079; Referee: M Spain (Offaly)

=== Munster Senior Hurling Championship ===
First round

5 June 1955 First round	Clare	3–08 – 2–10	Cork	Thurles Sportsfield, Thurles
	J Carney 1–4, D Dillon 1–2, J Greene 1–0, J Smyth 0–2.		C Ring 0–5, WJ Daly 1–1, Hartnett 1–0, J Clifford 0–1, O McAuliffe 0–1, M McAuliffe 0–1, Murphy 0–1.	Attendance: 25,256; Referee: T O'Sullivan

Semi-finals

22 May 1955 Semi-final	Limerick	4–05 – 3–05	Waterford	Cork Athletic Grounds, Cork
	V Cobbe 2–4, T Casey 1–0, M Fitzgibbon 1–0, J Fitzgibbon 0–1, McInerney 0–1.		P Grimes 1–2, S Power 1–1, M Óg Morrissey 1–0, Healy 0–2.	Referee: T Twomey

19 June 1955 Semi-final	Tipperary	0–08 – 1–06	Clare	Gaelic Grounds, Limerick
	L Devaney 0–4, T Wall 0–2, S Bannon 0–1, T English 0–1.		J Carney 1–1, J Smyth 0–3, D Dillon 0–2.	Attendance: 38,000; Referee: C Conway

Final

10 July 1955 Final	Limerick	2–16 – 2–06	Clare	Gaelic Grounds, Limerick
	D Kelly 1–12, V Cobbe 1–0, R Prendergast 0–2, S Ryan 0–1, L Ryan 0–1.		J Greene 2–0, J Smyth 0–6.	Attendance: 23,125; Referee: C Conway

== All-Ireland Senior Hurling Championship ==
=== All-Ireland semi-finals ===
7 August 1955 Semi-final	Wexford	2–12 – 2–03	Limerick	Croke Park, Dublin
	Paddy Kehoe 1–1, T Ryan 1–1, N Rackard 0–4, T Flood 0–2, N English 0–2, Padge Kehoe 0–1, B Rackard 0–1.		V Cobbe 1–0, S Leonard 1–0, D Kelly 0–3.	Attendance: 50,840; Referee: C McLoughlin

=== All-Ireland final ===
4 September 1955 Final	Wexford	3–13 – 2–08	Galway	Croke Park, Dublin
	N Rackard 1–3, N Wheeler 1–2, T Flood 1–2, Padge Kehoe 0–2, Paddy Kehoe 0–1, S Hearne 0–1, T Ryan 0–1, J Morrissey 0–1.		P Egan 2–0, B Duffy 0–4, P Duggan 0–3, J Salmon 0–1.	Attendance: 72,854; Referee: B Stakelum (Tipperary)

== Championship statistics ==
=== Scoring ===
Top scorers overall

Rank	Player	Club	Tally	Total	Matches	Average
1	Nicky Rackard	Wexford	7–10	31	5	6.20
2	Tim Flood	Wexford	5–11	26	5	5.20
3	Seán Clohessy	Kilkenny	5–10	25	4	6.25
4	Dick Carroll	Kilkenny	0–19	19	4	4.75
5	Vivian Cobbe	Limerick	4-04	16	3	5.33
6	Dermot Kelly	Limerick	1–12	15	3	5.00
7	Dinny O'Callaghan	Westmeath	4-02	14	3	4.66
7	Dick Rockett	Kilkenny	4-02	14	4	3.50
8	John McGrath	Westmeath	0–12	12	3	4.00
9	Jimmy Carney	Clare	2-05	11	3	3.66
9	Jimmy Smyth	Clare	0–11	11	3	3.66

Top scorers in a single game

Rank	Player	Club	Tally	Total	Opposition
1	Dermot Kelly	Limerick	1–12	15	Clare
2	Tim Flood	Wexford	3-01	10	Westmeath
2	Vivian Cobbe	Limerick	2-04	10	Waterford
2	Seán Clohessy	Kilkenny	2-04	10	Meath
3	Dick Rockett	Kilkenny	3-00	9	Dublin
3	Nicky Rackard	Wexford	3-00	9	Kilkenny
4	Nicky Rackard	Wexford	2-02	8	Westmeath
4	Dick Carroll	Kilkenny	0-08	8	Dublin
5	Seánie O'Brien	Kilkenny	2-01	7	Meath
5	Jimmy Carney	Clare	1-04	7	Cork

=== Miscellaneous ===
- The attendance of 23,125 is one of the lowest attendances at a Munster final in recent years.
- The attendance of 50,840 at the game between Limerick and Wexford was a new record for an All-Ireland semi-final.
- Wexford win their second All-Ireland title, their first since 1910.

== Sources ==
- Corry, Eoghan, The GAA Book of Lists (Hodder Headline Ireland, 2005).
- Donegan, Des, The Complete Handbook of Gaelic Games (DBA Publications Limited, 2005).
