= Cork GAA =

County board of the Gaelic Athletic Association in Ireland

- Irish: Corcaigh; CLG Coiste Contae Chorcaí
- Nickname(s): The Rebels; The Leesiders; The Blood and Bandage
- Province: Munster
- Dominant sport: Dual county
- Ground(s): Páirc Uí Chaoimh; Páirc Uí Rinn
- County colours: Red White

County teams
- NFL: Division 2
- NHL: Division 1A
- Football Championship: Sam Maguire Cup
- Hurling Championship: Liam MacCarthy Cup
- Ladies' Gaelic football: Brendan Martin Cup
- Camogie: O'Duffy Cup

The Cork County Board of the Gaelic Athletic Association (GAA; Irish: Cumann Luthchleas Gael Coiste Contae Chorcaí), or Cork GAA, is one of the 32 county boards of the GAA in Ireland, and is responsible for Gaelic games in County Cork and the Cork county teams. It is one of the constituent counties of Munster GAA.

Cork is one of the few dual counties in Ireland, competing in a similar level in both football and hurling. However, despite both teams competing at the top level of the game for most of the county's history, the county hurling team has experienced more success, winning the All-Ireland Senior Hurling Championship on thirty occasions. By comparison, the county football team has won All-Ireland Senior Football Championship (SFC) on seven occasions, most recently in 2010. Cork was the third county from the province of Munster both to win an All-Ireland Senior Football Championship, as well as to appear in the final, following Limerick and Tipperary.

Traditionally football is strongest in the western and northern portions of the county, with the O'Donovan Rossa club of Skibbereen the only Cork team from outside the city to have an All-Ireland Club Football title. Hurling is the dominant sport in the east, with teams such as Sarsfields and Midleton having won Cork's club championship multiple times. Naturally, there are exceptions to this rule of thumb, with hurling pockets in football areas and vice versa. One example is Fermoy in east Cork, which has seven Cork football titles to its name.

The city of Cork traditionally has strong teams in both sports, with Nemo Rangers being the record-holders for All-Ireland Club Football Championships won, and Blackrock having three All-Ireland Club Hurling titles. As well as this, the St Finbarr's club in the city has ten Cork football titles and twenty six in hurling.

As of 2009, there were 260 clubs affiliated to Cork GAA — the highest, ahead of Dublin (215) and Antrim and Limerick, which each had 108.

== Colours and symbols ==
Cork city coat of arms

Cork's current GAA crest is based on the traditional coat of arms of Cork city. Like the coat of arms, the crest features the King's old castle and the Queen's old castle with the Shandon Steeple in between. The centre foreground of the crest features a ship, as does the coat of arms. This is due to Cork's history as a port city, also shown in the city motto "Statio Bene Fida Carinis", which translates to "A safe harbour for ships". The badge also features two footballs, along with a crossed pair of hurleys.

Cork's former colours (1888–1919)

Cork's traditional colours are red and white, but this was not always the case. In its early days of competing, the county wore a blue jersey with a saffron-coloured 'C' emblazoned on the chest. This was changed in 1919 when the Cork hurlers were preparing to play Dublin in the All-Ireland Final. In the week leading up to the game, British forces broke into the county board offices on Maylor Street in the city centre and seized the Cork jerseys. Because of the loss of their kit, the county board borrowed jerseys from the now-defunct Father O'Leary Temperance Association team. Cork went on to win the game, ending a sixteen-year spell without a trophy. Following this win Cork decided to wear the 'lucky' red jerseys in their future games.

This red and white colour scheme has led to the Cork strip being nicknamed the blood and bandage. A colour clash with Louth in the 1957 All-Ireland Football Final saw Cork wear the blue jerseys again, but this occasion saw the team wear the blue jersey of the province of Munster. In 1976 Cork's footballers became involved in an incident known as 'the three stripes affair'. Before the Munster football final Cork were offered a set of Adidas jerseys. The use of these jerseys caused controversy as it seemed to undermine the promotion of Irish manufacturers.

Cork's alternative colours are traditionally white jerseys and white shorts. These alternate colours were worn in the 1973 All-Ireland Football Final when Cork defeated Galway to claim their fourth title. They were worn again in the 2010 Final when Cork defeated Down for their seventh title. Since then, Cork have generally worn their traditional red jerseys on all occasions. All-white strips are the usual choice for Cork's football goalkeepers, while the hurling goalkeepers have traditionally worn red and white hooped shirts.

== Football ==
=== Clubs ===
The city of Cork's clubs Nemo Rangers are the record-holders for All-Ireland Club Football Championships won, while the St Finbarr's club in the city have eight Cork football titles.

=== County team ===
Football has always been seen as the weaker of the two sports in Cork. The game is strongest in the west of the county, in the north of the county and in Cork city. Success, especially at senior level, has been much more sporadic that with hurling. The biggest hindrance to success has been the presence of next-door neighbours Kerry. Cork has been the second strongest county in Munster since the 1940s and often one of the best in the country. Many very good Cork teams were unable to overcome Kerry when they met in the Munster Senior Football Championship final. Cork began the 1970s with three Munster titles in 4 years and the 1973 All-Ireland Senior Football Championship. But they then ran up against the great Kerry team of the 1970s and 1980s. In 1976, the two teams drew in the final of the Munster. The replay went to extra-time before two very controversial refereeing decisions saw Kerry victorious. Cork fell back after that for a number of years.

In 1983 Kerry was aiming to capture a record ninth consecutive Munster title; however, Cork pulled off one of their surprise victories. Kerry, however, won the next three Munster and All-Ireland titles. In 1987 Billy Morgan was back with Cork, this time as manager. That year Cork reclaimed the Munster Championship crown from the Kingdom. It was the first of four Munster titles in-a-row. They reached the All-Ireland final that year only to be defeated by Meath. In 1988 Cork were defeated by Meath for the second consecutive year after a replay. Having lost the previous two All-Ireland finals Cork were even hungrier for achievement in 1989. That year they captured the National Football League before facing Mayo in the championship decider. The game ended in victory for Cork who claimed their fifth-ever All-Ireland title. In 1990 Cork squared up to Meath in the All-Ireland final for the third time in four years. In a close game, Cork emerged victorious by two points to claim a second consecutive championship.

Cork surrendered their provincial title for the next two years; however, they reclaimed it in 1993. That year they reached another All-Ireland final; however, it was Derry who won their first All-Ireland title on that occasion. Cork won the next two Munster titles as well, however, they were later defeated in the All-Ireland semi-final on both those occasions. The defeat in 1995 brought an end to one of Cork's greatest-ever periods in football history. Four years later in 1999 Cork won the Munster title for the fifth time of the decade. They later faced old rivals, Meath, in the All-Ireland final; however, victory went to the Leinster men on that occasion.

While it was expected that the team would build on the success of 1999, Cork went into decline as Kerry began to dominate in Munster. In 2002 Cork triumphed again and captured the Munster title after a victory over Tipperary in a replay. The subsequent All-Ireland semi-final saw Cork take on Kerry. It was a historic occasion as it was the first time that the two sides had met in Croke Park. Unfortunately, Cork was trounced on a scoreline of 3–19 to 2–7. The year ended with the Cork hurling team going on strike. In turn, the football team joined in a sympathy strike. The players, who had been seeking better conditions, refused to play or train with the county again until the dispute with the county board was resolved. The player's demands included having their own doctor at all Championship and League games, resolving disputes over travel arrangements and providing players with free gymnasium access. The strike was eventually resolved and all the demands were met.

Following the strike, the fortunes of the Cork football team took a turn for the worse. A series of defeats in 2003 and 2004 saw the Cork football team almost at an all-time low. In 2005 Cork narrowly lost the Munster final but qualified for the All-Ireland semi-final where Kerry was again waiting. The scoreline of 1–19 to 1–9 in favour of the men from the Kingdom tells its own story. In 2006 Cork won their first Munster title in four years following a defeat of Kerry. The two sides met again in the All-Ireland semi-final; however, in a similar pattern Kerry was victorious. In 2007 Cork lost their Munster crown to Kerry; however, they made use of the qualifiers and found themselves in the All-Ireland final. Kerry, the old rivals, provided the opposition in the first all-Munster All-Ireland final. The game started on a level pegging; however, Kerry ran riot and captured the title with a 3–13 to 1–9 victory. It was one of Cork's most humiliating defeats.

The Cork senior footballers and hurlers withdrew their services for almost 100 days from November 2007 until February 2008. For more on this see 2007–08 Cork players' strike. In spite of this, Cork reached the All-Ireland semi-final where they lost to old rivals Kerry after a replay. Cork retained their Munster crown in 2009. The team advanced to the All-Ireland Final, overcoming 2008 champions Tyrone along the way, to meet Kerry in the final. Cork lost on a scoreline of 1–9 to 16 points for Kerry.

In April 2010, Cork won the National Football League Division 1 title with a 1–17 to 0–12 win against Mayo at Croke Park in front of a crowd of 27,005. On 19 September 2010, Cork won the All Ireland football title beating Down 0–16 to 0–15 in Croke Park. In April 2011, Cork retained the National Football League after a 0–21 to 2–14 win against Dublin.

== Hurling ==
=== Clubs ===
The city of Cork's clubs Blackrock have won three All-Ireland Club Hurling titles, while the St Finbarr's club in the city has 25 Cork hurling titles.

==== Current Championship Pyramid 2022 ====
Grade	Level on Pyramid	Championship						
Senior	1	Cork Premier Senior Hurling Championship 12+8 clubs and divisions – 1 relegation						
Senior	2	Cork Senior A Hurling Championship 12 clubs – 1 promotion, 1 relegation						
Intermediate	3	Cork Premier Intermediate Hurling Championship 12 clubs – 1 promotion, 1 relegation						
Intermediate	4	Cork Intermediate A Hurling Championship 12 clubs – 1 promotion, 1 relegation						
Junior	5	Cork Premier Junior Hurling Championship 12 clubs – 1 promotion, 1 relegation						
Junior	6	Duhallow Junior A Hurling Championship 7 Clubs – 0 or 1 promotion	North Cork Junior A Hurling Championship 14 Clubs – 0 or 1 promotion	Mid Cork Junior A Hurling Championship 10 Clubs – 0 or 1 promotion	West Cork Junior A Hurling Championship 11 Clubs – 0 or 1 promotion	City Junior A Hurling Championship 13 Clubs – 0 or 1 promotion	South East Junior A Hurling Championship 9 Clubs – 0 or 1 promotion	East Cork Junior A Hurling Championship 9 Clubs – 0 or 1 promotion
Junior	7	Duhallow Junior B Hurling Championship 5 Clubs – 0 or 1 promotion	North Cork Junior B Hurling Championship 8 Clubs – 0 or 1 promotion	Mid Cork Junior B Hurling Championship 8 Clubs – 0 or 1 promotion	West Cork Junior B Hurling Championship 5 Clubs – 0 or 1 promotion	City Junior B Hurling Championship 10 Clubs – 0 or 1 promotion	South East Junior B Hurling Championship 4 Clubs – 0 or 1 promotion	East Cork Junior B Hurling Championship 12 Clubs – 0 or 1 promotion

=== County team ===
In the early days Cork had been one of the few teams that was interested in fielding a hurling team in the first All-Ireland championship in 1887, however, a dispute over which team should represent the county led to Cork not taking part at all. The county entered a team in 1888 and went on to win their first All-Ireland title in 1890 when Aughabullogue beat Castlebridge of Wexford.

In the early years of the competition the various county champions represented their county in the All-Ireland series, however, all this changed in 1892 when Cork contested, and won, their second All-Ireland final with a team consisting of the best players from the various clubs all over the county. Further All-Ireland titles in 1893 and 1894 meant Cork became the first team to win the coveted three-in-row. This record stood until it was later equalled by Kilkenny and Tipperary. Between 1901 and 1905 Cork appeared in five successive All-Ireland finals, however, victory only came in the form of a two-in-a-row in 1902 and 1903. Following this Cork's hurlers faced a barren spell of sixteen years until their next All-Ireland win in 1919. A further five All-Ireland finals were contested by Cork between 1926 and 1931 with victory coming on four occasions.

==== Cork's Greatest ever team? ====
By one important measure the Cork team of the 1940s is regarded as one of the two greatest teams of all-time. They are one of only three teams to win four All-Ireland hurling titles in-a-row (the other two being the Kilkenny team of 2006 to 2009 and the Limerick team of 2020-2023). In 1941 an optimistic Cork were buoyed up for an All-Ireland victory that had eluded them since 1931 (Cork had been beaten in the 1939 final). A bizarre turn of events, however, eventually allowed Cork to be declared champions but also cast doubt over the value of their victory. An outbreak of foot-and-mouth disease in the midlands forced Tipperary and Kilkenny to withdraw from the competition. As a result, Cork faced Limerick in the Munster final, and defeated them, before hammering Dublin in the All-Ireland decider for one of the handiest championships ever won. Following the All-Ireland final Cork played Tipperary in the delayed Munster final and lost, thus becoming the very first All-Ireland champions but provincial runners-up. For these reasons Cork's first win of four in-a-row is often dismissed by their opponents.

In 1942 Jim Barry and his Cork team set out to prove that their victory had not been a fluke caused by outside events. They defeated Tipperary in the Munster final and silenced their critics, before going on to claim their second consecutive All-Ireland title by defeating Dublin again. In 1943 Cork were again Munster champions and qualified for the All-Ireland final where their opponents were expected to be Kilkenny. The "cats", however, were surprisingly defeated by Antrim, a junior team, in the All-Ireland semi-final. Cork went on to record a comprehensive victory over the Ulstermen in the final and claim a third consecutive All-Ireland victory. In 1944 Cork were again Munster champions, defeating Mick Mackey's Limerick side in the decider. They just about prevented an upset in the All-Ireland semi-final, squeezing past Galway before walloping their old enemy Dublin in the final. Cork were on their best form in that final, and set a record of four All-Ireland titles in-a-row that has never been equalled.

Five consecutive All-Ireland titles were beyond this Cork team as they were defeated in the 1945 Munster final. They returned in 1946, however, winning back their Munster crown and defeating Kilkenny in the All-Ireland final. It was one of the great one-man shows by Christy Ring who, at the age of 25, collected his fifth All-Ireland winner medal. The story of this Cork team's success was bookended by defeat the classic 1947 All-Ireland final. This match has come to be known as the "thunder and lightning final." On the day before World War II broke out, Cork faced a Kilkenny side who were playing in their fourth final in five years. The game was played at a frantic pace with both sides remaining level for much of the game. Just as the game reached its climax a crack of thunder interrupted the play and the rain bucketed down. After a tense battle Kilkenny emerged victorious by a solitary point. This defeat brought an end to the unprecedented run of success of the Cork team of the 1940s.

==== The 1950s ====
Between 1949 and 1951 Cork had met Tipperary every year in the Munster final. Each year Tipp had won and went on to claim the All-Ireland title. By 1952 Cork had an extra motivating factor because they realised that if Tipperary beat them again, they would almost certainly win a fourth consecutive All-Ireland title and equal the record set by Cork in the 1940s. At the start of the 1952 championship Tipp were hot favourites to retain their All-Ireland crown. It looked like the same old story in the Munster final as Cork conceded a goal after just three minutes of play. A goal for Cork from Mossie O'Riordan was the turning point of the match, however, and Cork ended Tipp's hopes of four in-a-row with a scoreline of 1–11 to 2–7. Christy Ring, who had again proved instrumental in the victory, was shouldered off the field with blood streaming down his face and a bandage around his head. Cork went on to narrowly defeat Galway in the All-Ireland semi-final before hammering Dublin in the final.

In 1953 Cork set out to defend their title. They defeated their old rivals Tipperary in the Munster final and set up a meeting with Galway in the All-Ireland decider. The game would go down in history as the dirtiest All-Ireland final ever played. Galway believed that the physical route was the best way to upset Cork and it did. In a low scoring game Cork won by a single point, however, the battle didn't stop at Croke Park. Later that night some of the Galway players arrived at the Gresham Hotel where Cork were staying. A fight broke, with Christy Ring getting a punch in the face and falling down some steps. The melee ended just as quick as it had begun. In 1954 Cork were the favourites to complete another three in-a-row. They defeated Tipperary again in the Munster final, before storming past Galway in the All-Ireland semi-final. The Corkmen then advanced to play Wexford in one of the most eagerly anticipated All-Ireland finals ever. Wexford were hotly tipped to spoil Cork's quest for another treble, however, on the day Cork's defence were on top form. They won on a scoreline of 1–9 to 1–6, with Christy Ring becoming the first player to win eight All-Ireland medals.

In 1955 Cork were beaten by Clare in the opening round of the Munster championship, however, they returned for one final swansong in 1956. They regained their Munster crown, courtesy of a hat-trick by Christy Ring, and set up another All-Ireland final showdown with Wexford. It was another classic encounter but sides at their peak. The turing point of the game came when Wexford were two points up. Their goalkeeper, Art Foley, saved a great shot by Christy Ring and cleared the ball. Within seconds Nicky Rackard scored a goal to win the game for Wexford. The final score was 2–14 to 2–8. Ring had been denied his ninth All-Ireland medal. In a show of solidarity Bobby Rackard and Nick O'Donnell of Wexford shouldered Ring off the field. It would be Cork's last All-Ireland final appearance for ten years.

==== Another three-in-a-row ====
The Cork hurling team that captured a third All-Ireland title in-a-row in 1978.

In 1966 Cork came from nowhere to win their first Munster title in a decade and advanced to an All-Ireland final decider against Kilkenny. None of the Cork team had ever played in Croke Park before, however, for Kilkenny it was like their home stadium. There was even speculation that Christy Ring, the age of 45, was about to come out of retirement to play for Cork, however, this didn't happen. While Kilkenny were the favourites Gerald McCarthy captained one of the youngest Cork teams ever to victory. Kilkenny had their revenge over Cork in 1969, however, in 1970 Cork captured the Liam MacCarthy Cup with a massive win over Wexford.

The 1970s was to be a glorious decade for Cork's hurlers. In 1975 Cork won their first Munster title since 1972. It was to be the first of five Munster Championship victories in-a-row. An All-Ireland semi-final loss to Galway raised certain doubts over Cork's ability. They silenced their critics in 1976 when Cork faced Wexford in the All-Ireland final. After 8 minutes Cork were in severe trouble, having conceded two goals and two points. It looked as if the game was going to be a repeat of the 1956 final, however, Cork fought back to win what has been referred to as Pat Moylan's All-Ireland final.

In 1977 Cork were back in the All-Ireland final taking on Wexford for the second consecutive year. The game didn't start as quickly as the previous year, however, it was no less as exciting. Cork's captain, Martin O'Doherty, and the team's goalkeeper, Martin Coleman, were the heroes of the day, as Cork won on a scoreline of 1–17 to 3–8. The three-in-a-row was the major talking-point yet again and Cork didn't disappoint, making it to the All-Ireland final again. This time their opponents were Kilkenny. They gave Cork a fright when they scored an early goal, however, an opportunistic goal by Cork's Jimmy Barry-Murphy sealed victory for the Leesiders. Sporting history was made. The possibility of completing a famous four-in-a-row looked extremely likely in 1979 when Cork captured their fifth Munster title. A defeat at the All-Ireland semi-final stage by Galway ended Cork's run of success, and brought an end to the careers of many of their most famous players.

==== 1980s and 1990s ====
After little success in the early 1980s Cork reclaimed their Munster Championship crown in 1982. It was the first of five Munster titles in-a-row. They reached the All-Ireland final that year only to be defeated by Kilkenny. In 1983 Cork were defeated by "the cats" for the second consecutive year. 1984 was a special year for Gaelic games as it was the centenary year of the Gaelic Athletic Association. Having lost the previous two All-Ireland finals Cork were even hungrier for success in 1984. The plan nearly came unstuck in the Munster final when Tipperary were up by four points with four minutes to go. Two goals from Seánie O'Leary and Tony O'Sullivan sealed victory for "the Rebels" and they advanced to an easy win over Offaly in the All-Ireland final at Semple Stadium.

In 1986 Cork were back in the All-Ireland final, this time facing hot favourites Galway. Cork scored four goals on that day and, in spite of a late goal by Galway's P.J. Molloy, Cork won the day on a scoreline of 4–13 to 2–15. Four years later in 1990 Cork were Munster champions again before taking part in another final against Galway. Again Cork were the underdogs coming into the final. In one of the most high-scoring finals in years Cork emerged victorious again with a scoreline of 5–15 to 2–21. The 1990s which started so well were to prove difficult for the Cork hurlers. After losing to Kilkenny in the All-Ireland final in 1992 it would take until 1999 for Cork to re-emerge as Munster and All-Ireland champions. Jimmy Barry-Murphy, who had given so much service as a player, masterminded the youngest Cork team ever to another All-Ireland victory.

==== 1999–present ====
While it was expected that the team would build on the success of 1999 the exact opposite happened. After a defeat to Offaly in the All-Ireland semi-final in 2000 the team went into terminal decline. In 2002 the entire senior hurling panel took the unprecedented move of going on strike. The players, who had been seeking better conditions, refused to play or train with the county again until the dispute with the county board was resolved. The players demands included having their own doctor at all Championship, League, resolving disputes over travel arrangements and providing players with free gymnasium access. The strike was eventually resolved and all the demands were met, but not before the Cork footballers also went on strike in sympathy.

Following the strike the Cork hurlers came back stronger than ever, winning three out of the next four Munster championships. Cork became the best team in the country reaching four consecutive All-Ireland finals with victories coming in 2004 and 2005. In 2006 Cork attempted to capture an elusive three-in-a-row, however, they were defeated by Kilkenny.

== Camogie ==
The Cork County Board of the Camogie Association oversees camogie in County Cork. A county team contests the All-Ireland Senior Camogie Championship.

Cork have a rich Camogie history, winning the most titles in all Senior competitions. 16 National League titles, 24 Munster Championship titles and 30 All Ireland Championship titles.

St Finbarr's National Hurling & Football Club are the reigning Cork Senior Camogie Championship winners as they defeated St Catherines GAA 0-15 to 0-9 in the 2025 final to gain back to back titles.

Their various intercounty teams had a good season in 2025.

While they gained success, winning The inaugural Munster U23 competition, The Munster Minor Championship, Munster U16 ‘A’ Championship, Munster U16 ‘B’ Championship, All Ireland U16 ‘B’ / Development Championship, as well as the Munster U17 ‘A’ Shield Competition.

There was also heartbreak as they lost out in 4 All Ireland Finals, Senior, U23A, Minor A & U16A. 3 of those defeats came against major rivals Galway.

After losing the 2025 All Ireland final and getting through Hannah’s Looney dismissal, 14 of the girls involved in that were not involved in playing for championship 2026, a third of the team and nearly half of the panel going. But the manager Ger Manley and his team of Liam Cronin and Wesley O’Brien remained committed to the cause.

== Ladies' football ==
The Cork County Board of the Ladies' Gaelic Football Association oversees ladies' football in County Cork. At present, there are 84 registered ladies' football clubs in County Cork. The Cork county ladies' football team contests the All-Ireland Senior Ladies' Football Championship.

== Handball ==
The Cork Handball Board of the Gaelic Athletic Association oversees handball in County Cork.

== Rounders ==
The Cork County Board of the Gaelic Athletic Association also oversees rounders in County Cork.
