= Bill O'Donnell (hurler) =

Tipperary hurler

Personal information
- Native name: Liam Ó Dónaill (Irish)
- Born: William O'Donnell; 13 January 1912 Golden, County Tipperary, Ireland
- Died: 28 January 1980 (aged 68) Dundrum, County Tipperary, Ireland
- Occupation: National school principal

Sport
- Sport: Hurling
- Position: Left wing-forward
Clubs
- Years: Club
- Golden–Kilfeacle; Éire Óg Annacarty
Club titles
- Tipperary titles: 1
Inter-county
- Years: County
- 1934–1944: Tipperary
Inter-county titles
- Munster titles: 2
- All-Irelands: 1
- NHL: 0

William O'Donnell (13 January 1912 – 28 January 1980) was an Irish hurler. At club level he played for Golden–Kilfeacle and Éire Óg Annacarty and was the left wing-forward on the Tipperary senior hurling team that won the 1937 All-Ireland Championship.

A native of Golden, County Tipperary, O'Donnell was educated at Rockwell College, where he won a Harty Cup medal in 1930. He began his club career with Golden–Kilfeacle but won a Tipperary Senior Championship medal with Éire Óg Annacarty in 1943, after transferring to them in January of that year.

O'Donnell made his first appearance for the Tipperary senior hurling team during the 1934 Munster Championship and had a number of successes as a forward over the following decade. In 1937 he won an All-Ireland Championship medal when Tipperary defeated Kilkenny, having earlier won a Munster Championship medal. O'Donnell won a second Munster Championship medal in 1941.

== Honours ==
Rockwell College

- Dr Harty Cup (1): 1930

Éire Óg Annacarty

- Tipperary Senior Hurling Championship (1): 1943

Tipperary

- All-Ireland Senior Hurling Championship (1): 1937
- Munster Senior Hurling Championship (2): 1937, 1941

Munster

- Railway Cup (4): 1938, 1940, 1942 (c), 1943

Achievements
Preceded by Bobby Hinks	Railway Cup Hurling Final winning captain 1942	Succeeded by Jack Lynch
