= 1955 Railway Cup Hurling Championship =

Irish hurling competition

1955 Railway Cup
- Date: 13 March 1955 - 3 April 1955
- Teams: Connacht; Leinster; Munster; Ulster
- Champions: Munster (22nd title); Christy Ring (captain)
- Runners-up: Connacht

Tournament statistics
- Matches played: 3
- Goals scored: 21 (7 per match)
- Points scored: 45 (15 per match)
- Top scorer(s): Christy Ring (3-09)

The 1955 Railway Cup Hurling Championship was the 29th series of the inter-provincial hurling Railway Cup. Three matches were played between 13 March 1955 and 3 April 1955 to decide the title. It was contested by Connacht, Leinster, Munster and Ulster.

Leinster entered the championship as the defending champions, however, they were defeated by Munster at the semi-final stage.

On 3 April 1955, Munster won the Railway Cup after a 6-08 to 3-04 defeat of Connacht in the final at Croke Park, Dublin. It was their 22nd Railway Cup title overall and their first title since 1953.

Munster's Christy Ring was the Railway Cup top scorer with 3-09.

== Results ==
Semi-finals

13 March 1955 Semi-final	Ulster	2-04 - 5-10	Connacht	Casement Park, Belfast
	Bob Elliott 1-0, Brendan Elliott 1-0, McDonald 0-3, O'Neill 0-1.		M Elwood 1-1, P Duggan 1-0, B Duffy 1-0, P Manton 1-0, T Boyle 1-0, P O'Donoghue 0-2, P Fahy 0-2, P Egan 0-2, T Glynn 0-1, M Murphy 0-1, M Cullinane 0-1.	Referee: C McLoughlin (Dublin)

17 March 1955 Semi-final	Leinster	2-09 - 3-10	Munster	Croke Park, Dublin
	Allen 1-1, Morrissey 1-1, S Clohessy 0-3, Maher 0-2, T Flood 0-1, Walsh 0-1.		C Ring 1-5, J Smyth 1-1, J Hartnett 1-0, D Dillon 0-2, WJ Daly 0-1, P Stakelum 0-1.	Attendance: 40,826; Referee: R Stakelum (Tipperary)

Final

3 April 1955 Final	Connacht	3-04 - 6-08	Munster	Croke Park, Dublin
	E Monaghan 1-1, J Fives 1-0, T Glynn 1-0, J Salmon 0-1, P Duggan 0-1, M Cullinane 0-1.		C Ring 2-4, WJ Daly 2-1, J Hartnett 1-0, J Greene 1-0, D Dillon 0-2, S Power 0-1.	Attendance: 11,799; Referee: C McLoughlin (Dublin)

== Top scorers ==
Overall

Rank	Player	County	Tally	Total	Matches	Average
1	Christy Ring	Munster	3-09	18	2	9.00
2	Willie John Daly	Munster	2-02	8	2	4.00
3	Josie Hartnett	Munster	2-00	6	2	3.00

Single game

Rank	Player	County	Tally	Total	Opposition
1	Christy Ring	Munster	2-04	10	Connacht
2	Christy Ring	Munster	1-05	8	Ulster
3	Willie John Daly	Munster	2-01	7	Connacht

== Sources ==
- Donegan, Des, The Complete Handbook of Gaelic Games (DBA Publications Limited, 2005).
