= 2004 Interprovincial Hurling Championship =

- Date: 23 October 2004 - 5 December 2004
- Teams: Connacht; Leinster; Munster; Ulster
- Sponsor: M Donnelly & Co
- Champions: Connacht (11th title); Ollie Fahy (captain)
- Runners-up: Munster

Tournament statistics
- Matches played: 3
- Goals scored: 6 (2 per match)
- Points scored: 83 (27.67 per match)
- Top scorer(s): Niall Healy (0-12); Eoin Kelly (0-12)

The 2004 Interprovincial Hurling Championship was the 77th series of the inter-provincial hurling championship, also known as the Railway Cup. Three matches were played between 23 October 2004 and 5 December 2004 to decide the title. It was contested by Connacht, Leinster, Munster and Ulster.

Leinster entered the championship as the defending champions, however, they were defeated by Munster at the semi-final stage.

On 5 December 2004, Connacht won the Railway Cup after a 1-15 to 0-09 defeat of Munster in the final at Pearse Stadium in Galway. It was their 11th Railway Cup title overall and their first title since 1998.

Connacht's Niall Healy and Munster's Eoin Kelly were the Interprovincial Championship joint top scorers with 0-12 each.

== Results ==
Semi-finals

23 October 2004 Semi-final	Ulster	2-11 - 2-24	Connacht	Casement Park, Belfast
	B McFall (1-4, frees), M Herron (1-2), G Johnson (0-3), B McGourty (0-2).	Report	N Healy (0-11, five frees), E Tannaghan (2-2), O Fahy (0-3), A Kerins (0-2), D Tierney (0-2); F Healy (0-2), D O'Brien (0-1), D Collins (0-1).	Referee: B Gavin (Offaly)

24 October 2004 Semi-final	Leinster	0-13 - 1-21	Munster	Croke Park, Dublin
	J Young (0-5, 65, 3f); E Brennan (0-2), M Jacob (0-2), B Murphy (0-2), J Hoyne (0-1), R Mullally (0-1).	Report	N Gilligan (0-6, two 65's), J Deane (1-2), E Kelly (0-5, four frees), O Moran (0-2); E Corcoran (0-2), J Mullane (0-2), T Browne (0-1), D Bennett (0-1).	Referee: T McIntyre (Antrim)

Final

5 December 2004 Final	Connacht	1-15 - 0-09	Munster	Pearse Stadium, Galway
	M Kerins (0-6, 3 frees), D Donoghue (1-1), O Fahy (0-4), K Broderick (0-2); D Collins (0-1), N Healy (0-1).		E Kelly (0-7, frees), N Gilligan (0-2, 1 free, 1 65).	Attendance: 815; Referee: É Morris (Dublin)

== Top scorers ==
Overall

Rank	Player	County	Tally	Total	Matches	Average
1	Niall Healy	Connacht	0-12	12	2	6.00
1	Eoin Kelly	Munster	0-12	12	2	6.00

Single game

Rank	Player	County	Tally	Total	Opposition
1	Niall Healy	Connacht	0-11	11	Ulster
2	Enda Tannaghan	Connacht	2-02	8	Ulster
3	Brian McFall	Ulster	1-04	7	Connacht
3	Eoin Kelly	Munster	0-07	7	Connacht

== Sources ==
- Donegan, Des, The Complete Handbook of Gaelic Games (DBA Publications Limited, 2005).
