= 1998 Railway Cup Hurling Championship =

Irish hurling competition

- Dates: 8 November 1998 - 22 November 1998
- Teams: 4
- Champions: Leinster
- Runners-up: Connacht

Tournament statistics
- Matches played: 3
- Goals scored: 8 (2.67 per match)
- Points scored: 79 (26.33 per match)
- Top scorer(s): Charlie Carter (1-09)

The 1998 Railway Cup Hurling Championship was the 70th staging of the Railway Cup since its establishment by the Gaelic Athletic Association in 1927. The cup began on 8 November 1998 and ended on 22 November 1998.

Munster were the defending champions, however, they were beaten by Leinster in the semi-final.

On 22 November 1998, Leinster won the cup after a 0-16 to 2–09 defeat of Connacht in the final at Nowlan Park. This was their 21st Railway Cup title overall and their first title since 1993.

== Results ==
=== Semi-finals ===
| 8 November 1998 Semi-final | Leinster | 2-15 - 0-09 | Munster | Nowlan Park, Kilkenny |
| | C Carter 1-5, D Cuddy 0-6, M Storey 1-1, J Troy 0-2, A Fenlon 0-1. | | P Flynn 0-3, S McGrath 0-2, M Galligan 0-2, O Moran 0-1, T Dunne 0-1. | Referee: G Devlin (Armagh) |

| 8 November 1998 Semi-final | Ulster | 1-12 - 3-18 | Connacht | Corrigan Park, Belfast |
| | A Elliott 1-2, Greg O'Kane 0-5, O Collins 0-3, G McGonigle 0-1, P McKillen 0-1. | | C Moore 1-7, A Kelly 1-2, A Kerins 1-2, O Fahy 0-4, D Greally 0-3. |

=== Final ===
| 22 November 1998 Final | Leinster | 0-16 - 2-09 | Connacht | Nowlan Park, Kilkenny |
| | D Cuddy 0-5, C Carter 0-4, M Storey 0-3, B McEvoy 0-1, J Troy 0-1, DJ Carey 0-1, N Moloney 0-1. | | K Broderick 1-1, A Kerins 1-1, O Fahy 0-2, A Kelly 0-2, C Moore 0-1, N Kenny 0-1, J Rabbitte 0-1. | Referee: G Devlin (Armagh) |

== Bibliography ==
- Donegan, Des, The Complete Handbook of Gaelic Games (DBA Publications Limited, 2005).
