= 1947 Railway Cup Hurling Championship =

Irish hurling competition

1947 Railway Cup
- Dates: 9 March 1947 - 6 April 1947
- Teams: Connacht; Leinster; Munster; Ulster
- Champions: Connacht (1st title); Seánie Duggan (captain)
- Runners-up: Munster; Christy Ring (captain)

Tournament statistics
- Matches played: 3
- Goals scored: 16 (5.33 per match)
- Points scored: 24 (8 per match)
- Top scorer(s): Jerry O'Riordan (4-00)

The 1947 Railway Cup Hurling Championship was the 21st series of the inter-provincial hurling Railway Cup. Three matches were played between 9 March and 6 April 1947. It was contested by Connacht, Leinster, Munster and Ulster.

Munster entered the championship as the defending champions.

On 6 April 1947, Connacht won the Railway Cup after a 2–05 to 1–01 defeat of Munster in the final at Croke Park, Dublin. This was their first ever title.

Munster's Jerry O'Riordan was the Railway Cup top scorer with 4-00.

== Results ==
Semi-finals

9 March 1947 Semi-final	Connacht	2-06 - 2-05	Leinster	Croke Park, Dublin
	S Gallagher 1-1, H Gordon 1-1, J Gallagher 0-2, P Jordan 0-1, P Gantley 0-1.		N Rackard 1-1, J Mulcahy 1-0, S Óg Ó Ceallacháin 0-2, L Reidy 0-1, T Leahy 0-1.

16 March 1947 Semi-final	Munster	9-07 - 0-00	Ulster	Croke Park, Dublin
	T Doyle 3-1, J O'Riordan 3-0, M O'Riordan 2-0, M Ryan 1-1, V Baston 0-2, C Ring 0-2, M Hayes 0-1.

Final

6 April 1947 Final	Connacht	2-05 - 1-01	Munster	Croke Park, Leinster
	H Gordon 1-0, J Kelly 1-0, J Gallagher 0-3, S Gallagher 0-1, J Killeen 0-1.		J O'Riordan 1-0, C Ring 0-1.	Referee: S Conroy (Laois)

== Top scorers ==
Overall

Rank	Player	County	Tally	Total	Matches	Average
1	Jerry O'Riordan	Munster	4-00	12	2	6.00
2	Tommy Doyle	Munster	3-01	10	2	5.00
3	Stephen Gallagher	Connacht	1-02	5	2	2.50
3	Josie Gallagher	Connacht	0-05	5	2	2.50

Single game

Rank	Player	County	Tally	Total	Opposition
1	Tommy Doyle	Munster	3-01	10	Ulster
2	Jerry O'Riordan	Munster	3-00	9	Ulster
3	Mossy O'Riordan	Munster	2-00	6	Ulster

== Sources ==
- Donegan, Des, The Complete Handbook of Gaelic Games (DBA Publications Limited, 2005).
