= 1945 Railway Cup Hurling Championship =

Irish hurling competition

1945 Railway Cup
- Dates: 11 February – 17 March 1945
- Teams: Connacht; Leinster; Munster; Ulster
- Champions: Munster (13th title)

Tournament statistics
- Matches played: 4
- Goals scored: 24 (6 per match)
- Points scored: 37 (9.25 per match)
- Top scorer(s): Mick Mackey (3-06)

The 1945 Railway Cup Hurling Championship was the 19th series of the inter-provincial hurling Railway Cup. Four matches were played between 11 February and 17 March 1945. It was contested by Connacht, Leinster, Munster and Ulster.

Munster entered the championship as the defending champions.

On 17 March 1945, Munster won the Railway Cup after a 6–08 to 2–00 defeat of Ulster in the final at Croke Park, Dublin. This was their 13th title over all and their fourth title in succession.

Munster's Mick Mackey was the Railway Cup top scorer with 3–06.

== Results ==
Semi-finals

11 February 1945 Semi-final	Ulster	3–01 – 2–03	Leinster	Corrigan Park, Belfast
	White 2–0, Mulholland 1–0, N Campbell 0–1.		Hassett 1–2, O'Riordan 1–1, Cantwell 1–0, N Wade 0–1.

11 February 1945 Semi-final	Connacht	2–05 – 2–05	Munster	Pearse Stadium, Galway
	Gallagher 2–4, Thornton 0–1.		M Mackey 2–1, D Stokes 0–1, J Power 0–1, M Hickey 0–1, P Clohessy 0–1.

4 March 1945 Semi-final replay	Munster	4–08 – 3–07	Connacht	Gaelic Grounds, Limerick
	T Purcell 1–1, J Power 1–1, M Quane 1–0, J Quirke 1–0, M Mackey 0–3, C Ring 0–3.		Molloy 2–1, J Gallagher 0–4, Colgan 1–0, Cunningham 0–2.

Final

17 March 1945 Final	Munster	6–08 – 2–00	Ulster	Croke Park, Dublin
	J Quirke 2–2, M Mackey 1–2, D Stokes 1–1, T Purcell 1–0, PJ Quane 1–0, C Cottrell 0–1, J Young 0–1, C Ring 0–1.		C Mullan 1–0, Denvir 1–0.	Attendance: 31,704

== Top scorers ==
Overall

Rank	Player	County	Tally	Total	Matches	Average
1	Mick Mackey	Munster	3–06	15	3	5.00
2	Josie Gallagher	Conancht	2–08	14	2	7.00
3	Johnny Quirke	Munster	3–02	11	3	3.66

Single game

Rank	Player	County	Tally	Total	Opposition
1	Josie Gallagher	Connacht	2–04	10	Munster
2	Johnny Quirke	Munster	2–02	8	Connacht
3	T. Molloy	Connacht	2–01	7	Munster

== Sources ==
- Donegan, Des, The Complete Handbook of Gaelic Games (DBA Publications Limited, 2005).
- Fennelly, Teddy and Dowling, Paddy, "Ninety Years of GAA in Laois" (Leinster Express, 1975)
