= 1943 Railway Cup Hurling Championship =

Irish hurling competition

1943 Railway Cup
- Dates: 14 February – 17 March 1943
- Teams: Connacht; Leinster; Munster
- Champions: Munster (11th title)

Tournament statistics
- Matches played: 2
- Goals scored: 13 (6.5 per match)
- Points scored: 15 (7.5 per match)
- Top scorer(s): Jim Langton (2-04)

The 1943 Railway Cup Hurling Championship was the 17th series of the Railway Cup, an annual hurling championship organised by the Gaelic Athletic Association. The championship took place between 14 February and 17 March 1943. It was contested by Connacht, Leinster and Munster.

Munster entered the championship as the defending champions.

On 17 March 1943, Munster won the Railway Cup after a 3-05 to 4-03 defeat of Leinster in the final at Croke Park, Dublin. It was their 11th Railway Cup title overall and their second title in succession.

Leinster's Jim Langton was the Railway Cup's top scorer with 2-04.

== Results ==
Semi-final

14 February 1943 Semi-final	Munster	3-05 - 3-02	Connacht	MacDonagh Park, Nenagh
	C Ring 2-1, J Quirke 1-0, B O'Donnell 0-3, J Lynch 0-1, D Stokes 0-1.		MJ Flaherty 1-1, Ryan 1-0, S Thornton 1-0, Baston 0-1.

Final

17 March 1943 Final	Leinster	3-05 - 4-03	Munster	Croke Park, Dublin
	J Langton 2-4, J Walsh 1-1.		B O'Donnell 1-0, J Quirke 1-0, J Power 1-0, J Mackey 1-0, C Ring 0-2, J Lynch 0-1.

== Top scorers ==
Overall

Rank	Player	County	Tally	Total	Matches	Average
1	Jim Langton	Leinster	2-04	10	2	10.00
2	Christy Ring	Munster	2-03	9	2	4.50
3	Johnny Quirke	Munster	2-00	6	2	3.00
3	Bill O'Donnell	Munster	1-03	6	2	3.00

Single game

Rank	Player	County	Tally	Total	Opposition
1	Jim Langton	Leinster	2-04	10	Munster
2	Christy Ring	Munster	2-01	7	Connacht
3	Jimmy Walsh	Leinster	1-01	4	Munster
3	M. J. Flaherty	Connacht	1-01	4	Munster

== Sources ==
- Donegan, Des, The Complete Handbook of Gaelic Games (DBA Publications Limited, 2005).
