= 1937 Railway Cup Hurling Championship =

Irish hurling competition

1937 Railway Cup
- Dates: 14 February – 17 March 1937
- Teams: 3
- Champions: Munster (7th title); Mick Mackey (captain)
- Runners-up: Leinster; Jack Duggan (captain)

Tournament statistics
- Matches played: 2
- Goals scored: 11 (5.5 per match)
- Points scored: 16 (8 per match)
- Top scorer: Mick Mackey (1-07)

The 1937 Railway Cup Hurling Championship was the 11th staging of the Railway Cup since its establishment by the Gaelic Athletic Association in 1927. The cup began on 14 February 1937 and ended on 17 March 1937.

Leinster were the defending champions.

On 17 March 1937, Munster won the cup following a 1-09 to 3-01 defeat of Leinster in the final at Croke Park. This was their sixth Railway Cup title overall and their first title since 1934.

== Results ==
Semi-final

14 February 1937 Semi-final	Munster	4-05 - 3-01	Connacht	Cusack Park, Ennis
	M Mackey 1-3, D Clohessy 1-1, M Brennan 1-0, M Hennessy 1-0, L Blake 0-1.		Behan 1-0, Hoban 1-0, Darcy 1-0, Gill 0-1.	Referee: J O'Regan (Cork)

Final

17 March 1937 Final	Leinster	3-01 - 1-09	Munster	Croke Park
	M Whyte 1-0, H Gray 1-0, N Wade 1-0, P Phelan 0-1.		M Mackey 0-4, M Brennan 1-0, J Quirke 0-2, J Mackey 0-1, C Moylan 0-1, J Cooney 0-1.	Attendance: 14,483; Referee: I Harney (Galway)

== Sources ==
- Donegan, Des, The Complete Handbook of Gaelic Games (DBA Publications Limited, 2005).
