= 1939 Railway Cup Hurling Championship =

Irish hurling competition

1939 Railway Cup
- Dates: 26 February – 17 March 1939
- Teams: Connacht; Leinster; Munster
- Champions: Munster (8th title)

Tournament statistics
- Matches played: 2
- Goals scored: 13 (6.5 per match)
- Points scored: 17 (8.5 per match)
- Top scorer(s): Locky Byrne (3-01)

The 1939 Railway Cup Hurling Championship was the 13th series of the Railway Cup, an annual hurling championship organised by the Gaelic Athletic Association. The championship took place between 26 February and 17 March 1939. It was contested by Connacht, Leinster and Munster.

Munster entered the championship as the defending champions.

On 17 March 1939, Munster won the Railway Cup after a 4–04 to 1–06 defeat of Leinster in the final at Croke Park, Dublin. It was their 8th Railway Cup title overall and their third in succession.

Munster's Locky Byrne was the Railway Cup's top scorer with 3-01.

== Results ==
Semi-final

26 February 1939 Semi-final	Munster	8-05 - 0-02	Connacht	St. Brendan's Park, Birr
	M Brennan 2-1, C Moylan 2-1, L Byrne 2-1, J Quirke 1-1, M Mackey 1-0, J Mackey 0-1.		J Costello 0-1, J Hanniffy 0-1.

Final

17 March 1939 Final	Leinster	1-06 - 4-04	Munster	Croke Park, Dublin
	M Flynn 1-0, P Phelan 0-3, H Gray 0-1, M McDonald 0-1, M Gill 0-1.		J Mackey 1-0, M Mackey 1-0, L Byrne 1-0, J Mullane 1-0, N Wade 0-3, M Brennan 0-1.	Referee: I Harney (Galway)

== Top scorers ==
Overall

Rank	Player	County	Tally	Total	Matches	Average
1	Locky Byrne	Munster	3-01	10	2	5.00
2	Micka Brennan	Munster	2-02	8	2	4.00
3	Christy Moylan	Munster	2-01	7	2	3.50
4	Mick Mackey	Munster	2-00	6	2	3.00
5	John Mackey	Munster	1-01	4	2	2.00
5	Johnny Quirke	Munster	1-01	4	2	2.00

Single game

Rank	Player	County	Tally	Total	Opposition
1	Micka Brennan	Munster	2-01	7	Connacht
1	Christy Moylan	Munster	2-01	7	Connacht
1	Locky Byrne	Munster	2-01	7	Connacht
2	Johnny Quirke	Munster	1-01	4	Connacht
3	Mick Mackey	Munster	1-00	3	Connacht
3	Mick Flynn	Leinster	1-00	3	Munster
3	Mick Mackey	Munster	1-00	3	Leinster
3	John Mackey	Munster	1-00	3	Leinster
3	Locky Byrne	Munster	1-00	3	Leinster
3	Jim Mullane	Munster	1-00	3	Leinster
3	Paddy Phelan	Leinster	0-03	3	Munster
3	Ned Wade	Munster	0-03	3	Leinster

== Sources ==
- Donegan, Des, The Complete Handbook of Gaelic Games (DBA Publications Limited, 2005).
