= 1949 Railway Cup Hurling Championship =

Irish hurling competition

1949 Railway Cup
- Date: 13 February 1949 - 17 March 1949
- Teams: Connacht; Leinster; Munster; Ulster
- Champions: Munster; Jim Ware (captain)
- Runners-up: Connacht

Tournament statistics
- Matches played: 3
- Goals scored: 17 (5.67 per match)
- Points scored: 42 (14 per match)
- Top scorer(s): Josie Gallagher (3-09)

The 1949 Railway Cup Hurling Championship was the 23rd series of the inter-provincial hurling Railway Cup. Three matches were played between 13 February 1949 and 17 March 1949 to decide the title. It was contested by Connacht, Leinster, Munster and Ulster.

Munster entered the championship as the defending champions.

On 17 March 1949, Munster won the Railway Cup after a 5-03 to 2-09 defeat of Connacht in the final at Croke Park, Dublin. It was their 17th Railway Cup title overall and their second title in succession. The attendance of 40,091 set a new record for the Railway Cup finals.

Connacht's Josie Gallagher was the Railway Cup top scorer with 3-09.

== Results ==
Semi-finals

13 February 1949 Semi-final	Munster	2-08 - 1-08	Leinster	Croke Park, Dublin
	C Ring 2-2, J Keane 0-3, J Devitt 0-1, W Carroll 0-1, V Baston 0-1.		P Lalor 1-0, J Kennedy 0-3, J Langton 0-2, D Dillon 0-2, S Downey 0-1.	Attendance: 17,371; Referee: MJ Flaherty (Galway)

13 February 1949 Semi-final	Connacht	5-07 - 2-07	Ulster	Croke Park, Dublin
	J Gallagher 2-4, Scanlan 1-2, MJ Flaherty 1-0, S Marmion 1-0, T Moroney 0-1.		S McDonnell 0-6, M Guilfoyle 1-0, S Fogarty 1-0, K Armstrong 0-1.	Attendance: 17,371; Referee: MJ Quane (Clare)

Final

17 March 1949 Final	Munster	5-03 - 2-09	Connacht	Croke Park, Dublin
	C Ring 2-3, E Daly 1-0, J Keane 1-0, M Daly 1-0.		J Gallagher 1-5, B Power 1-0, T Kelly 0-3, H Gordon 0-1.	Attendance: 40,091; Referee: MJ Quane (Clare)

== Top scorers ==
Overall

Rank	Player	County	Tally	Total	Matches	Average
1	Josie Gallagher	Connacht	3-09	18	2	9.00
2	Christy Ring	Munster	4-05	17	2	8.50

Single game

Rank	Player	County	Tally	Total	Opposition
1	Josie Gallagher	Connacht	2-04	10	Ulster
2	Christy Ring	Munster	2-03	9	Connacht
3	Christy Ring	Munster	2-02	8	Leinster
3	Josie Gallagher	Connacht	1-05	8	Munster

== Sources ==
- Donegan, Des, The Complete Handbook of Gaelic Games (DBA Publications Limited, 2005).
