= 1984 Railway Cup Hurling Championship =

Irish hurling competition

- Dates: 17 March 1984 - 18 March 1984
- Teams: 4
- Champions: Munster (36th title); John Fenton (captain)
- Runners-up: Leinster

Tournament statistics
- Matches played: 3
- Goals scored: 9 (3 per match)
- Points scored: 70 (23.33 per match)
- Top scorer(s): Joe McKenna (2-08)

The 1984 Railway Cup Hurling Championship was the 58th staging of the Railway Cup since its establishment by the Gaelic Athletic Association in 1927. The cup began on 17 March 1984 and ended on 18 March 1984.

Connacht were the defending champions, however, they were beaten by Leinster in the semi-final.

On 18 March 1984, Munster won the cup after a 1-18 to 2-09 defeat of Leinster in the final at Cusack Park. This was their 36th Railway Cup title overall and their first title since 1981.

== Results ==
=== Semi-finals ===
17 March 1984 Semi-final	Connacht	0-05 - 2-10	Leinster	Duggan Park, Ballinasloe
	F Gantley 0-4, J Connolly 0-1.		B Fitzpatrick 1-4, PJ Cuddy 1-0, P Critchley 0-2, C Heffernan 0-1, G Fennelly 0-1, J Delaney 0-1, A Fogarty 0-1.

17 March 1984 Semi-final	Munster	3-21 - 1-07	Ulster	Gaelic Grounds, Limerick
	J McKenna 2-6, K Hennessy 0-3, B Ryan 0-2, O O'Connor 0-2, G McInerney 0-2, S Stack 0-1, T Mulcahy 0-1, D Fitzgerald 0-1.		E Sheehan 0-4, W Avena 1-0, D Donnelly 0-2, B Donnelly 0-1.

=== Final ===
18 March 1984 Final	Munster	1-18 - 2-09	Leinster	Cusack Park, Ennis
	J Fenton 0-5, T Mulcahy 1-0, B Ryan 0-3, G McInerney 0-2, J McKenna 0-2, N English 0-2, J Carroll 0-2, D Fitzgerald 0-2.		PJ Cuddy 1-0, M Cosgrove 1-0, G Fennelly 0-3, C Heffernan 0-2, A Fogarty 0-1, F Cummins 0-1, P Critchley 0-1, J Conran 0-1.	Referee: N O'Donoghue (Dublin)

== Scoring statistics ==
Top scorers overall

Rank	Player	Club	Tally	Total	Matches	Average
1	Joe McKenna	Munster	2-08	14	2	7.00
2	Billy Fitzpatrick	Leinster	1-04	7	2	3.50
3	P. J. Cuddy	Leinster	2-00	6	2	3.00

== Bibliography ==
- Donegan, Des, The Complete Handbook of Gaelic Games (DBA Publications Limited, 2005).
