= 1948 Railway Cup Hurling Championship =

Irish hurling competition

1948 Railway Cup
- Date: 15 February 1948 - 17 March 1948
- Teams: Connacht; Leinster; Munster; Ulster
- Champions: Munster; Willie Murphy (captain)
- Runners-up: Leinster

Tournament statistics
- Matches played: 3
- Goals scored: 21 (7 per match)
- Points scored: 26 (8.67 per match)
- Top scorer(s): Jackie Cahill (3-00); Christy Ring (1-06)

The 1948 Railway Cup Hurling Championship was the 22nd series of the inter-provincial hurling Railway Cup. Three matches were played between 15 February 1948 and 17 March 1948 to decide the title. It was contested by Connacht, Leinster, Munster and Ulster.

Connacht entered the championship as the defending champions, however, they were defeated by Munster at the semi-final stage.

On 17 March 1948, Munster won the Railway Cup after a 5-05 to 3-05 defeat of Leinster in the final at Croke Park, Dublin. It was their 16th Railway Cup title overall and their first Railway Cup title since 1946. The attendance of 37,103 set a new record for the Railway Cup finals.

Leinster's Jackie Cahill (3-00) and Munster's Christy Ring (1-06) were the Railway Cup top scorers.

== Results ==
Semi-finals

15 February 1948 Semi-final	Ulster	4-02 - 5-05	Leinster	Lurgan
	Butler 1-1, Lenagh 1-0, Guilfoyle 1-0, Doherty 1-0, Mullan 0-1.		J Cahill 3-0, N Rackard 1-1, J Langton 0-2, T Leahy 0-1, M Hassett 0-1.

15 February 1948 Semi-final	Connacht	1-04 - 6-05	Munster	Dunlo GAA Grounds, Ballinasloe
	J Brophy 1-0, J Gallagher 0-2, P Mahony 0-1, W Fahy 0-1.		S Herbert 2-1, C Ring 1-4, M Daly 2-0, T Doyle 1-0.	Referee: J Conroy (Laois)

Final

17 March 1948 Final	Munster	3-05 - 2-05	Leinster	Croke Park, Dublin
	V Baston 2-0, E Daly 1-1, C Ring 0-2, M Daly 0-1, M O'Riordan 0-1.		N Rackard 1-1, J Langton 0-4, S Downey 1-0.	Attendance: 37,103; Referee: MJ Flaherty (Galway)

== Top scorers ==
Overall

Rank	Player	County	Tally	Total	Matches	Average
1	Jackie Cahill	Leinster	3-00	9	1	9.00
1	Christy Ring	Munster	1-06	9	2	4.50
2	Nicky Rackard	Leinster	2-02	8	2	4.00
3	Mick Daly	Munster	2-01	7	2	3.50

Single game

Rank	Player	County	Tally	Total	Opposition
1	Jackie Cahill	Leinster	3-00	9	Ulster
2	Seán Herbert	Munster	2-01	7	Connacht
2	Christy Ring	Munster	1-04	7	Connacht
3	Vin Baston	Munster	2-00	6	Leinster

== Sources ==
- Donegan, Des, The Complete Handbook of Gaelic Games (DBA Publications Limited, 2005).
