= 1954 Railway Cup Hurling Championship =

Irish hurling competition

1954 Railway Cup
- Date: 21 February 1954 - 17 March 1954
- Teams: Connacht; Leinster; Munster; Ulster
- Champions: Leinster (6th title); Johnny McGovern (captain)
- Runners-up: Munster; Christy Ring (captain)

Tournament statistics
- Matches played: 3
- Goals scored: 16 (5.33 per match)
- Points scored: 41 (13.67 per match)

The 1954 Railway Cup Hurling Championship was the 28th series of the inter-provincial hurling Railway Cup. Three matches were played between 21 February 1954 and 17 March 1954 to decide the title. It was contested by Connacht, Leinster, Munster and Ulster.

Munster entered the championship as the defending champions.

On 17 March 1954, Leinster won the Railway Cup after a 0-09 to 0-05 defeat of Leinster in the final at Croke Park, Dublin. It was their sixth Railway Cup title overall and their first title since 1941. The final, which had a record attendance of 49,023, was the first which failed to produce a goal from either team.

== Results ==
Semi-finals

21 February 1954 Semi-final	Munster	4-12 - 3-07	Connacht	Croke Park, Dublin
	C Ring 1-4, J Smyth 2-0, WJ Daly 1-2, J Hartnett 0-2, M Nugent 0-2, J Kiely 0-1, S Bannon 0-1.		B Duffy 1-4, T Glynn 1-0, G Dolan 1-0, J Molloy 0-3.	Attendance: 18,336; Referee: J Mulcahy (Kilkenny)

21 February 1954 Semi-final	Leinster	8-07 - 1-01	Ulster	Croke Park, Dublin
	M Kelly 3-0, P Fitzgerald 3-0, J Langton 1-1, T Flood 1-1, M Ryan 0-2, N Wheeler 0-2, N Allen 0-1.		S Fitzgerald 1-0, R McMullan 0-1.	Attendance: 18,336; Referee: M Leahy (Dublin)

Final

17 March 1954 Final	Munster	0-05 - 0-09	Leinster	Croke Park, Dublin
	C Ring 0-3, J Kiely 0-1, S Bannon 0-1.		J Langton 0-3, J Sutton 0-2, M Kelly 0-1, P Fitzgerald 0-1, N Allen 0-1, T Flood 0-1,	Attendance: 49,023; Referee: MJ Flaherty (Connacht)

== Top scorers ==
Overall

Rank	Player	County	Tally	Total	Matches	Average
1	Mickey Kelly	Leinster	3-01	10	2	5.00
1	Paul Fitzgerald	Leinster	3-01	10	2	5.00
1	Christy Ring	Munster	1-07	10	2	5.00

Single game

Rank	Player	County	Tally	Total	Opposition
1	Mickey Kelly	Leinster	3-00	9	Ulster
1	Paul Fitzgerald	Leinster	3-00	9	Ulster
2	Christy Ring	Munster	1-04	7	Connacht
2	Billy Duffy	Connacht	1-04	7	Munster
3	Jimmy Smyth	Munster	2-00	6	Connacht

== Sources ==
- Donegan, Des, The Complete Handbook of Gaelic Games (DBA Publications Limited, 2005).
