= 1961 Railway Cup Hurling Championship =

Irish hurling competition

1960 Railway Cup
- Date: 19 February - 17 March 1961
- Teams: Connacht; Leinster; Munster; Ulster
- Champions: Munster; Tony Wall (captain)
- Runners-up: Leinster

Tournament statistics
- Matches played: 3
- Goals scored: 19 (6.33 per match)
- Points scored: 51 (17 per match)
- Top scorer(s): Jimmy Doyle (2-10)

The 1961 Railway Cup Hurling Championship was the 35th series of the inter-provincial hurling Railway Cup. Three matches were played between 19 February 1961 and 17 March 1961 to decide the title. It was contested by Connacht, Leinster, Munster and Ulster.

Munster entered the championship as the defending champions.

On 17 March 1961, Munster won the Railway Cup after a 4-12 to 3-09 defeat of Leinster in the final at Croke Park, Dublin. It was their fifth Railway Cup title in succession.

Munster's Jimmy Doyle was the Railway Cup top scorer with 2-10.

== Results ==
Semi-final

19 February 1961 Semi-final	Ulster	1-02 - 3-13	Munster	Casement Park, Belfast
	D Gallagher 1-0, J McVeigh 0-1, P Mullaney 0-1.		C Ring 2-1, J Smyth 1-2, J Doyle 0-4, L Devaney 0-4, T Kelly 0-1, S Power 0-1.	Referee: A McCallan (Antrim)

19 February 1961 Semi-final	Connacht	3-07 - 5-08	Leinster	Duggan Park, Ballinasloe
	S Gohery 1-4, P Sweeney 1-0, PJ Lawless 1-0, J Salmon 0-2, J Conroy 0-1.		B Dwyer 2-1, P Kehoe 1-4, S O'Brien 1-1, O McGrath 1-0, E Keher 0-2.

Final

17 March 1961 Final	Munster	4-12 - 3-09	Leinster	Croke Park, Dublin
	J Doyle 2-6, T Cheasty 1-1, L Devaney 1-0, C Ring 0-2, T Wall 0-1, F Walsh 0-1, T English 0-1.		T Flood 1-4, S Quaid 1-2, O McGrath 1-1, D Foley 0-1, S Clohessy 0-1.	Attendance: 34,856; Referee: J Dowling (Offaly)

== Top scorers ==
=== Overall ===
Rank	Player	County	Tally	Total
1	Jimmy Doyle	Munster	2-10	16
2	Christy Ring	Munster	2-03	9

=== Single game ===
Rank	Player	County	Tally	Total	Opposition
1	Jimmy Doyle	Munster	2-06	12	Leinster
2	Christy Ring	Munster	2-01	7	Ulster
2	Billy Dwyer	Leinster	2-01	7	Connacht
2	Séamus Gohery	Connacht	1-04	7	Leinster
2	Padge Kehoe	Leinster	1-04	7	Connacht
2	Tim Flood	Leinster	1-04	7	Munster
3	Jimmy Smyth	Munster	1-02	5	Ulster
3	Séamus Quaid	Leinster	1-02	5	Munster
