= 1935 Railway Cup Hurling Championship =

Irish hurling competition

- Dates: 24 February 1935 – 17 March 1935
- Teams: 3
- Champions: Munster (6th title); Timmy Ryan (captain)
- Runners-up: Leinster; Charlie McMahon (captain)

Tournament statistics
- Matches played: 2
- Goals scored: 17 (8.5 per match)
- Points scored: 13 (6.5 per match)
- Top scorer(s): Mick Hennessy (6-01)

The 1935 Railway Cup Hurling Championship was the ninth staging of the Railway Cup since its establishment by the Gaelic Athletic Association in 1927. The cup began on 24 February 1935 and ended on 17 March 1935.

Munster were the defending champions.

On 17 March 1935, Munster won the cup following a 3–04 to 3–00 defeat of Leinster in the final at Croke Park. This was their sixth Railway Cup title overall and their first second title in succession.

== Results ==
=== Semi-final ===
24 February 1935 Semi-final	Connacht	4-04 - 7-05	Munster	Portumna Sportsfield, Portumna
	R Donoghue 1-1, Ryan 1-0, G Heenan 1-0, Teehan 1-0, W Vaughan 0-1.		M Hennessy 5-1, M Mackey 2-1, T Ryan 0-1, J Barrett 0-1, M Brennan 0-1.

=== Final ===
17 March 1935 Final	Leinster	3-00 - 3-04	Munster	Croke Park, Dublin
	J Dunne 1-0, Mattie Power 1-0, L Byrne 1-0.		S Harrington 1-0, M Hennessy 1-0, M Kennedy 1-0, M Mackey 0-2, G Garrett 0-2.	Referee: S Jordan (Galway)

== Top scorers ==
Top scorers overall

Rank	Player	Club	Tally	Total	Matches	Average
1	Mick Hennessy	Munster	6-01	19	2	9.50
2	Mick Mackey	Munster	2-03	9	2	4.50
3	R. Donoghue	Connacht	1-01	4	1	4.00

== Bibliography ==
- Donegan, Des, The Complete Handbook of Gaelic Games (DBA Publications Limited, 2005).
