= 1972 Railway Cup Hurling Championship =

Irish hurling competition

- Dates: 30 January – 17 March 1972
- Teams: Combined Universities; Connacht; Leinster; Munster; Ulster
- Champions: Leinster

Tournament statistics
- Matches played: 5
- Goals scored: 15 (3 per match)
- Points scored: 92 (18.4 per match)

The 1972 Railway Cup Hurling Championship was the 46th series of the Railway Cup, an annual hurling tournament and organised by the Gaelic Athletic Association. The tournament took place between 26 January and 17 March 1972.

For the first time ever five teams participated. These included the four historic provinces of Ireland, Connacht, Leinster, Munster and Ulster, as well as a team representing the Combined Universities.

The tournament was won by Leinster.

== Participants ==
Since the inaugural tournament in 1927 Connacht, Leinster and Munster had participated in every running of the championship since then. Ulster joined the tournament in 1944 and immediately became regular participants. In late 1971 an application from the Universities' Council to enter a Combined Universities team in both the hurling and Gaelic football Railway Cup competitions was discussed by the Central Council of the GAA. The proposal was readily accepted and the Combined Universities team was permitted to participate.

== Results ==
=== Railway Cup ===
30 January
Preliminary round
14:45 IST/GMT+0 (UTC+0)

Combined Universities	0-5 – 1-1	Ulster
J. Ryan (0-2); M. Crotty (0-2); H. Goff (0-1)		E. Donnelly (1-0); A. Hamill (0-1)

Croke Park, Dublin
Referee: C. Foley (Dublin)

6 February
Preliminary round refixture
14:00 IST/GMT+0 (UTC+0)

Combined Universities	0-14 – 1-7	Ulster
J. Ryan (0-5); M. Crotty (0-4); J. Buckley (0-2); W. Moore (0-2); H. O'Sullivan (0-1)		M. Coleman (1-1); S. Richmond (0-2); P. Braniff (0-2); J. Hughes (0-1); W. Richmond (0-1)

Croke Park, Dublin
Referee: C. Foley (Dublin)

20 February
Semi-final
14:15 IST/GMT+0 (UTC+0)

Leinster	3-12 – 2-13	Combined Universities
T. Doran (2-0); P. Delaney (1-2); E. Keher (0-4); M. Brennan (0-2); H. Dalton (0-2); J. Walsh (0-1); B. Moylan (0-1)		J. Ryan (1-8); W. Moore (1-2); E. Moore (0-1); S. Hogan (0-1); M. Crotty (0-1)

Croke Park, Dublin
Referee: J. Hatton (Wicklow)

20 February
Semi-final
15:00 IST/GMT+0 (UTC+0)

Connacht	2-8 – 2-10	Munster
T. Ryan (1-2); P. Fahy (0-2); B. O'Connor (0-2); J. Connolly (0-1); A. Henry (0-1)		R. Bennis (1-4); É. Cregan (1-0); F. Loughnane (0-3); N. O'Dwyer (0-1); J. Kirwan (0-1); M. Moroney (0-1)

Portumna
Referee: M. Spain (Offaly)

17 March
Final
15:45 IST/GMT+0 (UTC+0)

Leintser	3-12 – 1-10	Munster
E. Keher (1-6); A. Doran (1-0); M. Bermingham (1-0); K. Purcell (0-2); B. Moylan (0-2); P. Delaney (0-1); P. Wilson (0-1)		R. Ryan (1-1); F. Loughnane (0-4); M. Roche (0-4); É. Cregan (0-1)

Croke Park, Dublin
Referee: N. Dalton (Waterford)

== Top scorers ==
=== Championship ===
Rank	Player	Team	Tally	Total	Matches	Average
1	Jack Ryan	Combined Universities	1–15	18	3	6.00
2	Eddie Keher	Leinster	1–10	13	2	6.50

== Media coverage ==
The Railway Cup final was broadcast live and in colour on RTÉ Television.
