= 2002 Railway Cup Hurling Championship =

Irish hurling competition

2002 Railway Cup
- Date: 2 November 2002 - 3 November 2002
- Teams: Connacht; Leinster; Munster; Ulster
- Champions: Leinster (22nd title); Andy Comerford (captain)
- Runners-up: Munster

Tournament statistics
- Matches played: 4
- Goals scored: 17 (4.25 per match)
- Points scored: 126 (31.5 per match)
- Top scorer(s): Eddie Brennan (2-06); Henry Shefflin (0-12)

The 2002 Railway Cup Hurling Championship was the 75th series of the inter-provincial hurling Railway Cup. Four matches were played between 2 November 2002 and 3 November 2002 to decide the title. It was contested by Connacht, Leinster, Munster and Ulster.

Munster entered the championship as the defending champions.

On 3 November 2002, Leinster won the Railway Cup after a 4-15 to 3-17 defeat of Munster in the final at Nowlan Park, Kilkenny. It was their 22nd Railway Cup title overall and their first title since 1997. In the Railway Shield final, Connacht defeated Ulster by 0-19 to 0-16.

Leinster's Eddie Brennan (2-06) and Henry Shefflin (0-12) were the Railway Cup joint top scorers.

== Results ==
Semi-finals

2 November 2002 Semi-final	Leinster	3-18 - 2-13	Connacht	Nowlan Park, Kilkenny
	E Brennan 1-3, H Shefflin 0-5, B Murphy 1-1, D Hyland 0-4, J Hoyne 1-0, C Keaney 0-3, D Lyng 0-1, J Brady 0-1.		M Kerins 1-1, D Donoghue 1-0, D Forde 0-3, C Moore 0-3, K Brady 0-2, F Forde 0-2, G Farragher 0-2.	Referee: S McMahon (Clare)

2 November 2002 Semi-final	Munster	5-18 - 0-10	Ulster	Nowlan Park, Kilkenny
	J Deane 2-2, K McGrath 0-6, T Griffin 1-2, T Dunne 1-1, B Begley 1-1, B O'Connor 0-3, E McGrath 0-2, S McMahon 0-1.		L Richmond 0-3, B McFall 0-3, P Richmond 0-2, C McCambridge 0-1, C McGuckian 0-1.	Referee: B Kelly (Westmeath)

Shield final

3 November 2002 Shield final	Connacht	0-19 - 0-16	Ulster	Nowlan Park, Kilkenny
	F Forde 0-7, F Healy 0-3, M Kerins 0-3, G Farragher 0-3, D O'Brien 0-1, D Donoghue 0-1, A Cullinane 0-1.		J Connolly 0-4, C Herron 0-3, C McCambridge 0-2, C McGuckian 0-2, B McFall 0-2, P Richmond 0-1, L Richmond 0-1, C Kelly 0-1.	Referee: S McMahon (Clare)

Final

3 November 2002 Final	Leinster	4-15 - 3-17	Munster	Nowlan Park, Kilkenny
	H Shefflin 0-7 (6f), E Brennan 1-3, C Keane, B Murphy 1-1 each, J Hoyne 1-0, J Coogan 0-2, D Lyng 0-1.		T Dunne 0-7 (1f, '65), E McGrath 2-1, K McGrath 0-3 (1f), P O'Connell 1-0, J Deane 0-2 (fs), B O'Connor 0-1 (f), A O'Shaughnessy, E Kelly, T Griffin 0-1 each.	Referee: G Devlin (Armagh)

== Top scorers ==
Overall

Rank	Player	County	Tally	Total	Matches	Average
1	Eddie Brennan	Leinster	2-06	12	2	6.00
1	Henry Shefflin	Leinster	0-12	12	2	6.00
2	Tommy Dunne	Munster	1-08	11	2	5.50
3	Joe Deane	Munster	2-04	10	2	5.00
4	Eoin McGrath	Munster	2-03	9	2	4.50
4	Ken McGrath	Munster	0-09	9	2	4.50
4	Francis Forde	Connacht	0-09	9	2	4.50
5	Brendan Murphy	Leinster	2-02	8	2	4.00

Single game

Rank	Player	County	Tally	Total	Opposition
1	Joe Deane	Munster	2-02	8	Ulster
2	Eoin McGrath	Munster	0-07	7	Leinster
2	Francis Forde	Connacht	0-07	7	Ulster
2	Henry Shefflin	Leinster	0-07	7	Munster
2	Tommy Dunne	Munster	0-07	7	Leinster
3	Eddie Brennan	Leinster	1-03	6	Connacht
3	Eddie Brennan	Leinster	1-03	6	Munster
3	Ken McGrath	Munster	0-06	6	Ulster

== Sources ==
- Donegan, Des, The Complete Handbook of Gaelic Games (DBA Publications Limited, 2005).
