= 1958 Railway Cup Hurling Championship =

Irish hurling competition

1958 Railway Cup
- Date: 16 February 1958 - 17 March 1958
- Teams: Connacht; Leinster; Munster; Ulster
- Champions: Munster; Phil Grimes (captain)
- Runners-up: Leinster

Tournament statistics
- Matches played: 3
- Goals scored: 20 (6.67 per match)
- Points scored: 48 (16 per match)
- Top scorer(s): Christy O'Brien (4-00)

The 1958 Railway Cup Hurling Championship was the 32nd series of the inter-provincial hurling Railway Cup. Three matches were played between 16 February 1958 and 17 March 1958 to decide the title. It was contested by Connacht, Leinster, Munster and Ulster.

Munster entered the championship as the defending champions.

On 17 March 1958, Munster won the Railway Cup after a 3–07 to 3–05 defeat of Leinster in the final at Croke Park, Dublin. It was their second Railway Cup title in succession.

Leinster's Christy O'Brien was the Railway Cup top scorer with 4-00.

== Results ==
Semi-finals

16 February 1958 Semi-final	Ulster	3-03 - 8-10	Leinster	Casement Park, Belfast
	S Fitzgerald 2-0, R Polly 1-0, S Wright 0-2, J Gibson 0-1.		C O'Brien 4-0, A Young 2-0, D Heaslip 1-3, H McGrath 1-0, N Wheeler 0-3, M Brophy 0-2, M Kenny 0-2.	Referee: J Howard (Dublin)

2 March 1958 Semi-final	Connacht	1-08 - 2-15	Munster	Pearse Stadium, Galway
	J Gill 1-0, J Salmon 0-3, PJ Lally 0-2, M Cullinane 0-1, J Lyons 0-1, J Quigley 0-1.		J Smyth 1-3, C Ring 0-4, P Grimes 1-0, L Moloney 0-3, J Doyle 0-3, D Kelly 0-2.	Referee: M Spain (Offaly)

Final

17 March 1958 Final	Munster	3-07 - 3-05	Leinster	Croke Park, Dublin
	J Smyth 0-4, D Whelan 1-0, J Doyle 1-0, P Barry 1-0, L Moloney 0-1, T Wall 0-1, C Ring 0-1.		M Kenny 1-4, B Dwyer 1-1, D Heaslip 1-0, N Wheeler 0-1.

== Top scorers ==
Overall

Rank	Player	County	Tally	Total	Matches	Average
1	Christy O'Brien	Leinster	4-00	12	2	6.00
2	Jimmy Smyth	Munster	1-07	10	2	5.00
3	Denis Heaslip	Leinster	2-03	9	2	4.50
3	Mick Kenny	Leinster	1-06	9	2	4.50

== Sources ==
- Donegan, Des, The Complete Handbook of Gaelic Games (DBA Publications Limited, 2005).
