= 1993 Railway Cup Hurling Championship =

1993 competition

- Dates: 10 October 1993 - 7 November 1993
- Teams: 4
- Champions: Leinster (20th title)
- Runners-up: Ulster

Tournament statistics
- Matches played: 3
- Goals scored: 7 (2.33 per match)
- Points scored: 82 (27.33 per match)

The 1993 Railway Cup Hurling Championship was the 65th staging of the Railway Cup since its establishment by the Gaelic Athletic Association in 1927. The cup began on 10 October 1993 and ended on 7 November 1993. Connacht – the defending champions – were beaten by Leinster in the semi-final. On 7 November 1993, Leinster won the cup after a 1-15 to 2–06 defeat of Ulster in the final. This was their 20th Railway Cup title overall and their first title since 1988.

== Results ==
=== Semi-finals ===
10 October 1993 Semi-final	Leinster	3-13 - 1-09	Connacht	O'Connor Park, Tullamore
	DJ Carey 0-5, P Potterton 1-2, A Ronan 1-1, M Storey 1-0, M Phelan 0-2, L O'Gorman 0-2, E Morrissey 0-1.		C Helebert 1-0, F Forde 0-3, M Headd 0-3, M Coleman 0-2, E Keville 0-1.

10 October 1993 Semi-final	Ulster	0-21 - 0-18	Munster	Casement Park, Belfast
	A Elliott 0-5, D O'Prey 0-3, N Sands 0-3, G O'Kane 0-2, S McMullen 0-2, M Mallon 0-1, C Mageean 0-1, P McKillen 0-1, J Carson 0-1, M Bailie 0-1, S McKillop 0-1.		B Egan 0-9, P Fox 0-4, J Leahy 0-3, D Carr 0-1, M Houlihan 0-1.

=== Final ===
7 November 1993 Final	Ulster	2-06 - 1-15	Leinster	Casement Park, Belfast
	A Elliott 1-1, N Sands 1-0, J O'Kane 0-2, D O'Prey 0-1, P McKillen 0-1, C Mageean 0-1.		E Morrissey 1-4, DJ Carey 0-4, A Ronan 0-3, M Storey 0-1, J Power 0-1, P O'Neill 0-1, M Phelan 0-1.

== Bibliography ==
- Donegan, Des, The Complete Handbook of Gaelic Games (DBA Publications Limited, 2005).
