= 2003 Railway Cup Hurling Championship =

Irish hurling competition

2003 Railway Cup
- Date: 18 October 2003 - 8 November 2003
- Teams: Connacht; Leinster; Munster; Ulster
- Champions: Leinster (23rd title); Michael Kavanagh (captain); Noel Skehan (manager)
- Runners-up: Connacht

Tournament statistics
- Matches played: 3
- Goals scored: 15 (5 per match)
- Points scored: 83 (27.67 per match)
- Top scorer(s): Henry Shefflin (4-06); Eugene Cloonan (3-09)

The 2003 Railway Cup Hurling Championship was the 76th series of the inter-provincial hurling Railway Cup. Three matches were played between 18 October 2003 and 8 November 2003 to decide the title. It was contested by Connacht, Leinster, Munster and Ulster.

Leinster entered the championship as the defending champions.

On 8 November 2003, Leinster won the Railway Cup after a 4–09 to 2–12 defeat of Connacht in the final at the Giulio Onesti Sports Complex in Rome. It was their 23rd Railway Cup title overall and their second title in succession.

Leinster's Henry Shefflin (4-06) and Connacht's Eugene Cloonan (3-09) were the Railway Cup joint top scorers.

== Results ==
Semi-finals

18 October 2003 Semi-final	Munster	1-16 - 1-20	Connacht	Gaelic Grounds, Limerick
	E Kelly 0-7, T Griffin 1-0, C Lynch 0-3, B O'Connor 0-2, S Brick 0-1, E Corcoran 0-1, C Gleeson 0-1, P Kelly 0-1.	Report	E Cloonan 1-6, M Kerins 0-5, K Borderick 0-4, A Kerins 0-2, T Óg Regan 0-1, K Burke 0-1, J Conroy 0-1.	Referee: B Kelly (Westmeath)

19 October 2003 Semi-final	Ulster	2-10 - 5-16	Leinster	Casement Park, Belfast
	B McFall 1-2, G Johnson 1-1, P Braniff 0-3, A Delargy 0-1, L Watson 0-1, C Herron 0-1, C McGuckian 0-1.	Report	H Shefflin 2-4, T Walsh 1-2, J Hoyne 1-1, R Jacob 1-1, B Carroll 0-3, R Hanniffy 0-2, C Keaney 0-1, J Young 0-1, D Hyland 0-1.	Referee: S Roche (Tipperary)

Final

8 November 2003 Final	Leinster	4-09 - 2-12	Connacht	Giulio Onesti Sports Complex, Rome
	H Shefflin (2-2), J Hoyne (1-1), R Hanniffy (1-1); T Walsh (0-2), C Keaney (0-1), D Lyng (0-1), G Hanniffy (0-1).		E Cloonan (2-3), R Gantley (0-2), A Kerins (0-2), M Kerins (0-2), D Forde (0-2), T Óg Regan (0-1).

== Top scorers ==
Overall

Rank	Player	County	Tally	Total	Matches	Average
1	Henry Shefflin	Leinster	4-06	18	2	9.00
1	Eugene Cloonan	Connacht	3-09	18	2	9.00
2	John Hoyne	Leinster	2-02	9	2	4.00
3	Tommy Walsh	Leinster	1-04	7	2	3.50
3	Mark Kerins	Connacht	0-07	7	2	3.50
3	Eoin Kelly	Munster	0-07	7	1	7.00

Single game

Rank	Player	County	Tally	Total	Opposition
1	Henry Shefflin	Leinster	2-04	10	Ulster
2	Eugene Cloonan	Connacht	2-03	9	Munster
2	Eugene Cloonan	Connacht	1-06	9	Leinster
3	Henry Shefflin	Leinster	2-02	8	Connacht
4	Eoin Kelly	Munster	0-07	7	Leinster
5	Tommy Walsh	Leinster	1-02	5	Ulster
5	Mark Kerins	Connacht	0-05	5	Munster

== Sources ==
- Donegan, Des, The Complete Handbook of Gaelic Games (DBA Publications Limited, 2005).
