= 1952 Railway Cup Hurling Championship =

Irish hurling competition

1952 Railway Cup
- Date: 17 February 1952 - 17 March 1952
- Teams: Connacht; Leinster; Munster; Ulster
- Champions: Munster (20th title); Pat Stakelum (captain)
- Runners-up: Connacht

Tournament statistics
- Matches played: 3
- Goals scored: 26 (8.67 per match)
- Points scored: 42 (14 per match)
- Top scorer(s): Christy Ring (4-05)

The 1952 Railway Cup Hurling Championship was the 26th series of the inter-provincial hurling Railway Cup. Three matches were played between 17 February 1952 and 17 March 1952 to decide the title. It was contested by Connacht, Leinster, Munster and Ulster.

Munster entered the championship as the defending champions.

On 17 March 1952, Munster won the Railway Cup after a 5–11 to 4–02 defeat of Connacht in the final at Croke Park, Dublin. It was their 20th Railway Cup title overall and their fifth title in succession.

Munster's Christy Ring was the Railway Cup top scorer with 4-05.

== Results ==
Semi-finals

17 February 1952 Semi-final	Munster	4-08 - 3-05	Leinster	Cork Athletic Grounds, Cork
	M Ryan 2-0, P Kenny 1-2, C Ring 1-2, S Bannon 0-2, P Stakelum 0-1, P Shanahan 0-1.		P Kehoe 2-1, N Rackard 1-1, W Walsh 0-2, J Langton 0-1.	Attendance: 12,000; Referee: J Phelan (Kilkenny)

17 February 1952 Semi-final	Ulster	3-00 - 7-06	Conancht	Corrigan Park, Belfast
	Lynn 1-0, Carroll 1-0, Elliott 1-0.		MJ Flaherty 4-0, Killeen 1-1, Manton 1-0, J Burke 1-0, J Gallagher 0-3, Duignan 0-2.

Final

17 March 1952 Final	Munster	5-11 - 4-02	Connacht	Semple Stadium, Thurles
	C Ring 3-3, M Ryan 1-1, P Kenny 1-1, P Shanahan 0-3, S Kiely 0-2, S Bannon 0-1.		J Gallagher 1-2, P Manton 1-0, MJ Flaherty 1-0, P Nolan 1-0.	Attendance: 41,416; Referee: S Whelan

== Sources ==
- Donegan, Des, The Complete Handbook of Gaelic Games (DBA Publications Limited, 2005).
