= 1950 Railway Cup Hurling Championship =

Irish hurling competition

1950 Railway Cup
- Date: 12 February 1950 - 17 March 1950
- Teams: Connacht; Leinster; Munster; Ulster
- Champions: Munster; Pat Stakelum (captain)
- Runners-up: Leinster

Tournament statistics
- Matches played: 3
- Goals scored: 18 (6 per match)
- Points scored: 34 (11.33 per match)
- Top scorer(s): Jimmy Kennedy (4-01)

The 1950 Railway Cup Hurling Championship was the 24th series of the inter-provincial hurling Railway Cup. Three matches were played between 12 February 1950 and 17 March 1950 to decide the title. It was contested by Connacht, Leinster, Munster and Ulster.

Munster entered the championship as the defending champions.

On 17 March 1950, Munster won the Railway Cup after a 0-09 to 1-03 defeat of Leinster in the final at Croke Park, Dublin. It was their 18th Railway Cup title overall and their third title in succession.

Munster's Jimmy Kennedy was the Railway Cup top scorer with 4-01.

== Results ==
Semi-finals

12 February 1950 Semi-final	Munster	9-04 - 3-02	Ulster	Croke Park, Dublin
	J Kennedy 4-0, M O'Riordan 3-0, M Ryan 1-2, C Ring 1-1, S Kenny 0-1.		G Lenagh 2-0, P McManus 1-1, T Best 0-1.	Referee: G Rosengrave (Dublin)

12 February 1950 Semi-final	Connacht	2-06 - 3-10	Leinster	Dunlo GAA Grounds, Ballinasloe
	L Fahy 1-0, H Gordon 1-0, J Gallagher 0-3, J Salmon 0-1, F Duignan 0-1, T Moroney 0-1.		J Langton 0-5, J Styles 1-1, P Kehoe 1-1, S Downey 1-0, N Rackard 0-1, T Herbert 0-1, P Donnelly 0-1.	Referee: T Semple (Tipperary)

Final

17 March 1950 Final	Munster	0-09 - 1-03	Leinster	Croke Park, Dublin
	C Ring 0-4, V Baston 0-2, M O'Riordan 0-1, J Kennedy 0-1, W McAllister 0-1.		T Herbert 1-0, S Downey 0-2, J Styles 0-1.	Attendance: 40,256

== Top scorers ==
Overall

Rank	Player	County	Tally	Total	Matches	Average
1	Jimmy Kennedy	Munster	4-01	13	2	6.50
2	Mossy O'Riordan	Munster	3-01	10	2	5.00
3	Christy Ring	Munster	1-05	8	2	4.00

== Sources ==
- Donegan, Des, The Complete Handbook of Gaelic Games (DBA Publications Limited, 2005).
