= 2017 GAA Interprovincial Championships =

2017 GAA season
- Football Champions: N/A
- Hurling Champions: N/A

The 2017 GAA Interprovincial Championships (formerly known as the Railway Cups) was a senior GAA competition in which the four provinces of Ireland were due to compete in Gaelic football and hurling. The provincial squads are made up of players from the county panels in each province.

Ulster were the reigning football champions and Munster were the reigning hurling champions from 2016.

The matches were due to be played on the weekend of 9 and 10 December 2017, but following Connacht's decision to withdraw from the competition, the ties were postponed. With no date set for the competition within the GAA's 2018 Master Fixtures plan, it was reported to be unlikely that the competition would return in the near future. The competition returned in 2024.

== Football Championship ==
=== Football Semi-finals ===
9 December 2017
Semi-final

Connacht	N/A	Munster
	Source

9 December 2017
Semi-final

Leinster	N/A	Ulster
	Source

=== Football final ===
10 December 2017
Final

Winner Semi-final 1	N/A	Winner Semi-final 2
	Source

== Hurling Championship ==
=== Hurling Semi-finals ===
9 December 2017
Semi-final

Connacht	N/A	Munster
	Source

9 December 2017
Semi-final

Leinster	N/A	Ulster
	Source

=== Hurling final ===
10 December 2017
Final

Winner Semi-final 1	N/A	Winner Semi-final 2
	Source
