= 1928 Railway Cup Hurling Championship =

Irish hurling competition

1928 Railway Cup
- Dates: 12 February 1928 – 17 March 1928
- Teams: 3
- Champions: Munster (1st title); Seán Óg Murphy (captain)
- Runners-up: Leinster; Mick Gill (captain)

Tournament statistics
- Matches played: 2
- Goals scored: 12 (6 per match)
- Points scored: 11 (5.5 per match)

The 1928 Railway Cup Hurling Championship was the second series of the inter-provincial hurling Railway Cup. Two matches were played between 12 February and 17 March 1928. It was contested by Connacht, Leinster and Munster.

Leinster entered the championship as the defending champions.

On 17 March 1928, Munster won the Railway Cup after a 2-02 to 1-02 defeat of Leinster in the final at Croke Park, Dublin. This was their first Railway Cup title.

== Teams ==
Province	Captain
Connacht	Jim Power
Leinster	Mick Gill
Munster	Seán Óg Murphy

== Results ==
=== Semi-final ===
12 February 1928 Semi-final	Connacht	2-04 - 7-03	Munster	Parkmore Sportsfield, Tuam
				Referee: S Robbins (Offaly)

=== Final ===
17 March 1928 Final	Leinster	1-02 - 2-02	Munster	Croke Park, Dublin
	M Power 1-0, N Fahy 0-1, M Gill 0-1.		JJ Callanan 2-0, T Considine 0-1, P Cahill 0-1.	Attendance: 15,000; Referee: W Walsh (Waterford)

== Sources ==
- Donegan, Des, The Complete Handbook of Gaelic Games (DBA Publications Limited, 2005).
