= 1946 Railway Cup Hurling Championship =

Irish hurling competition

1946 Railway Cup
- Dates: 17 February – 17 March 1945
- Teams: Connacht; Leinster; Munster; Ulster
- Champions: Munster (14th title); Ger Cornally (captain)

Tournament statistics
- Matches played: 3
- Goals scored: 13 (4.33 per match)
- Points scored: 49 (16.33 per match)
- Top scorer(s): Josie Gallagher (1-12)

The 1946 Railway Cup Hurling Championship was the 20th series of the inter-provincial hurling Railway Cup. Four matches were played between 11 February and 17 March 1945. It was contested by Connacht, Leinster, Munster and Ulster.

Munster entered the championship as the defending champions.

On 17 March 1946, Munster won the Railway Cup after a 3-12 to 4-08 defeat of Connacht in the final at Croke Park, Dublin. This was their 14th title over all and their fifth title in succession.

Connacht's Josie Gallagher was the Railway Cup top scorer with 1-12.

== Results ==
Semi-finals

17 February 1946 Semi-final	Munster	0-06 - 1-02	Leinster	Waterford Sportsfield, Waterford
	C Ring 0-3, M Mackey 0-2, M Ryan 0-1.		J Gargan 1-0, J Langton 0-1, D Kennedy 0-1.

17 February 1946 Semi-final	Connacht	4-14 - 1-07	Ulster	Croke Park, Dublin
	M Nestor 3-0, J Gallagher 0-6, M Doyle 0-4, Flynn 1-0, S Gallagher 0-3, J Jordan 0-1,		T Fitzgerald 1-0, N Campbell 0-2, J McGlynn 0-2, B Denvir 0-1, M Butler 0-1.

Final

17 March 1946 Final	Munster	3-12 - 4-08	Connacht	Croke Park, Leinster
	C Ring 1-7, T Doyle 1-1, P Fitzgerald 1-0, A O'Brien 0-1, J Young 0-1, P Lyons 0-1, J Power 0-1.		J Gallagher 1-6, F Gantley 1-0, J Flynn 1-0, M Nestor 1-0, J Killeen 0-1, MJ Flaherty 0-1.	Attendance: 35,170

== Sources ==
- Donegan, Des, The Complete Handbook of Gaelic Games (DBA Publications Limited, 2005).
