= 1969 Railway Cup Hurling Championship =

Irish hurling competition

1969 Railway Cup
- Dates: 23 February – 6 April 1969
- Teams: Connacht; Leinster; Munster; Ulster
- Champions: Munster (31st title)

Tournament statistics
- Matches played: 4
- Goals scored: 20 (5 per match)
- Points scored: 69 (17.25 per match)
- Top scorer(s): Jimmy Doyle (1–12)

The 1969 Railway Cup Hurling Championship was the 43rd series of the hurling Railway Cup. Four matches were played between 23 February and 6 April 1969. It was contested by Connacht, Leinster, Munster and Ulster.

Munster were the winners for the second year in-a-row and for the 31st occasion overall.

== Format ==
Preliminary round: (1 match) This was a single match between Connacht and Ulster, generally regarded as the two 'weakest' teams in the championship. One team was eliminated at this stage while the winning team advanced to the semi-final.

Semi-final: (1 match) This was a single match between the winners of the preliminary round and Leinster. One team was eliminated at this stage while the winning team advanced to the final.

Final: (1 match) This winners of the semi-final and Munster, who received a bye to this stage, contested this game.

== Results ==
=== Railway Cup ===
February 23
Preliminary round

Ulster	3–8 – 3–9	Connacht
M. Stafford (0–5), B. McGarry (1–0), B. Faloone (1–0), A. Hamill (1–0), N. Wheeler (0–1), S. Burns (0–1), P. Braniff (0–1).		B. Mitchell (3–1), P. Fahy (0–3), B. O'Connor (0–3), J. Connolly (0–2).

Casement Park, Belfast
Referee: C. Foley (Dublin)

March 2
Semi-final

Connacht	1–11 – 2–6	Leinster
B. O'Connor (1–1), J. Connolly (0–4), P. Mitchell (0–2), D. Coen (0–2), M. O'Connor (0–1), W. Murphy (0–1).		J. Berry (1–1), T. Doran (1–0), E. Keher (0–2), P. J. Whelahan (0–2), P. Molloy (0–1).

Duggan Park, Ballinasloe
Referee: E. O'Brien (Westmeath)

March 17
Final

Munster	2–9 – 2–9	Connacht
J. Doyle (0–5), É. Cregan (1–1), J. Callinan (1–0), J. Flanagan (0–2), J. McCarthy (0–1).		B. O'Connor (1–1), D. Coen (1–0), J. Connolly (0–3), M. O'Connor (0–2), P. Fahy (0–1), W. Murphy (0–1), S. Stanley (0–1).

Croke Park, Dublin
Referee: C. Foley (Dublin)

April 6
Final Replay

Connacht	4–4 – 3–13	Munster
P. Fahy (3–1), B. O'Connor (1–0), J. Connolly (0–2), W. Murphy (0–1).		J. Doyle (1–7), N. O'Dwyer (1–1), C. Cullinane (1–0), É. Cregan (0–2), J. McCarthy (0–1), L. Gaynor (0–1), P. J. Ryan (0–1).

Pearse Stadium, Galway
Referee: C. Foley (Dublin)

== Top scorers ==
=== Season ===
Rank	Player	County	Tally	Total	Matches	Average
1	Jimmy Doyle	Munster	1–12	15	2	7.50
2	Paddy Fahy	Connacht	3–5	14	3	4.66
2	Bernie O'Connor	Connacht	3–5	14	3	4.66

== Sources ==
- Donegan, Des, The Complete Handbook of Gaelic Games (DBA Publications Limited, 2005).
