= 1931 Railway Cup Hurling Championship =

Irish hurling competition

1931 Railway Cup
- Dates: 8 February 1931 – 17 March 1931
- Teams: 3
- Champions: Munster (4th title); Phil Purcell (captain)
- Runners-up: Leinster

Tournament statistics
- Matches played: 2
- Goals scored: 14 (7 per match)
- Points scored: 29 (14.5 per match)
- Top scorer(s): Mick Ahern (6-08)

The 1931 Railway Cup Hurling Championship was the fifth series of the inter-provincial hurling Railway Cup. Two matches were played between 8 February and 17 March 1931. It was contested by Connacht, who returned after a three-year absence, Leinster and Munster.

Munster entered the championship as the defending champions.

On 17 March 1931, Munster won the Railway Cup after a 1–12 to 2–06 defeat of Leinster in the final at Croke Park, Dublin. This was their fourth title over all and their fourth title in succession.

Munster's Mick Ahern was the Railway Cup top scorer with 6-08.

== Results ==
=== Semi-final ===
8 February 1931 Semi-final	Munster	10-09 - 1-02	Connacht	St. Brendan's Park, Birr
	M Ahern 6-5, P Cahill 1-1, M Cross 1-1, T Treacy 1-2, E Coughlan 1-0.		Cummins 1-0, Keating 0-1, I Harney 0-1.

=== Final ===
17 March 1931 Final	Leinster	2-06 - 1-12	Munster	Croke Park, Dublin
	M Power 2-1, S Hegarty 0-2, T Quinlan 0-1, Thompson 0-1, C Griffin 0-1.		T Considine 1-1, M Ahern 0-3, P Cahill 0-3, J Hurley 0-2, E Coughlan 0-1, M Kennedy 0-1.	Attendance: 12,700; Referee: S Jordan (Galway)

== Top scorers ==
Top scorers overall

Rank	Player	County	Tally	Total	Matches	Average
1	Mick Ahern	Munster	6-08	26	2	13.00
2	Matty Power	Leinster	2-01	7	1	7.00
2	Phil Cahill	Munster	1-04	7	2	3.50

== Sources ==
- Donegan, Des, The Complete Handbook of Gaelic Games (DBA Publications Limited, 2005).
