= 1951 Railway Cup Hurling Championship =

Irish hurling competition

1951 Railway Cup
- Date: 18 February 1951 - 17 March 1951
- Teams: Connacht; Leinster; Munster; Ulster
- Champions: Munster; Seán Kenny (captain)
- Runners-up: Leinster

Tournament statistics
- Matches played: 3
- Goals scored: 22 (7.33 per match)
- Points scored: 40 (13.33 per match)
- Top scorer(s): Shem Downey (5-02)

The 1951 Railway Cup Hurling Championship was the 25th series of the inter-provincial hurling Railway Cup. Three matches were played between 18 February 1951 and 17 March 1951 to decide the title. It was contested by Connacht, Leinster, Munster and Ulster.

Munster entered the championship as the defending champions.

On 17 March 1951, Munster won the Railway Cup after a 4-09 to 3-06 defeat of Leinster in the final at Croke Park, Dublin. It was their 19th Railway Cup title overall and their fourth title in succession.

Leinster's Shem Downey was the Railway Cup top scorer with 5-02.

== Results ==
Semi-finals

18 February 1951 Semi-final	Leinster	7-09 - 0-02	Ulster	Croke Park, Dublin
	S Downey 3-2, N Rackard 2-1, J Langton 1-3, P Kehoe 1-0, D Kennedy 0-2, N Allen 0-1.		W Lambert 0-2.	Attendance: 13,264; Referee: C Murphy (Cork)

18 February 1951 Semi-final	Munster	6-07 - 2-07	Connacht	Croke Park, Dublin
	C Ring 1-4, D McCarthy 2-0, M Nugent 1-2, P Kenny 1-1, M Ryan 1-0.		M Glynn 1-1, F Marmion 1-0, J Gallagher 0-3, J Molloy 0-1, M Burke 0-1, H Gordon 0-1.	Attendance: 13,264; Referee: J Phelan (Kilkenny)

Final

17 March 1951 Final	Munster	4-09 - 3-06	Leinster	Croke Park, Dublin
	C Ring 1-4, D McCarthy 2-0, M Ryan 1-1, P Kenny 0-4.		S Downey 2-0, N Rackard 1-1, T Flood 0-2, J Langton 0-1, P Kehoe 0-1, Morrissey 0-1.	Attendance: 36,684

== Top scorers ==
Overall

Rank	Player	County	Tally	Total	Matches	Average
1	Shem Downey	Leinster	5-02	17	2	8.50
2	Christy Ring	Munster	2-08	14	2	7.00
3	Derry McCarthy	Munster	4-00	12	2	6.00
4	Nicky Rackard	Leinster	3-02	11	2	5.50

Single game

Rank	Player	County	Tally	Total	Opposition
1	Shem Downey	Leinster	3-02	11	Ulster
2	Nicky Rackard	Leinster	2-01	7	Ulster
2	Christy Ring	Munster	1-04	7	Connacht
2	Christy Ring	Munster	1-04	7	Leinster

== Sources ==
- Donegan, Des, The Complete Handbook of Gaelic Games (DBA Publications Limited, 2005).
