= 2014 GAA Interprovincial Championships =

2014 GAA season
- Football Champions: Connacht
- Hurling Champions: Leinster

The 2014 GAA Interprovincial Championships was a senior GAA competition in which all 4 provinces of Ireland competed in football and hurling tournaments. The provincial squads are made up of players from county panels in each respective province.

On Sunday 23 February, Connacht defeated Ulster 2-19 to 1-07 in what was their first football Interprovincial Championship title in 45 years.

On Saturday 1 March, Leinster defeated Connacht 1-23 to 0-16 in what was their 29th overall Hurling Interprovincial Championship title.

== Football championship ==
=== Fixtures ===
Semi-finals		Final
Connacht	3-19
Munster	2-16	Connacht	2-19
Leinster	3-21	Ulster	1-07
Ulster	2-26

==== Semi-finals ====
16 February 2014
14:00
Semi-final

Connacht	3-19 - 2-16	Munster
C Cregg 1-7, P Conroy & E Mulligan (2fs) 0-5 each, A O'Shea and D Kelly 1-0 each, M Conroy and E Concannon 0-1 each	Report	B Hurley 2-2, D Goulding 0-5 (1f, 1 '45'), P Kerrigan & D O'Connor (1f), 0-2, J Lyne, M Collins, D Walsh, M Geaney and BJ Keane 0-1 each

St Jarlath's Park, Tuam
Referee: Cathal O Hagan
16 February 2014
14:00
Semi-final

Leinster	3-21 - 2-26	Ulster
M Newman (4fs), E O'Flaherty (1f) 0-4 each, L Glynn, P Cribben 1-1 each, B Menton 1-0, P McMahon, MD MacAuley, G Reilly, E O'Gara 0-2 each, J O'Loughlin, K McManamon, T Moolick 0-1 each	Report	M Murphy 0-8 (6fs, 1 '45), C McManus 1-4, E Keating 0-6, P Harte 1-1, D McCurry 0-2 (2fs), S Cavanagh, D Givney, J Kielt (f), K Hughes, M Donnelly 0-1 each

Páirc Tailteann, Navan
Referee: Eamon O Grady

==== Final ====
23 February 2014
14:30
Final

Connacht	2-19 - 1-07	Ulster
M Conroy and D Kelly 1-1 each; R Hennelly 0-3 (2f, 1 ’45), C Cregg and S Armstrong 0-3 each; K McLoughlin 0-2 (1f), K Higgins 0-2; N Daly, A O’Shea, E Mulligan and P Conroy 0-1 each.	Report	C Cavanagh 1-0; C McManus 0-3 (3f); N Morgan, S Cavanagh and M Murphy 0-1 (1f) each, M Poland 0-1.

St Jarlath's Park, Tuam
Referee: Derek O Mahoney

== Hurling championship ==
=== Fixtures ===
Semi-finals		Final
Connacht	1-18
Munster	0-16	Connacht	0-16
Leinster	8-18	Leinster	1-23
Ulster	1-21

==== Semi-finals ====
9 February 2014
14:00
Semi-final

Connacht	1-18 - 0-16	Munster
C Cooney 0-11 (7fs, 0-1pen), J Flynn 0-3, D Glennon 1-0, P Brehony 0-2, C Mannion & R Cummins 0-1 each	Report	P Horgan 0-6 (4fs), D Kearney, N McGrath, A Nash (2f) & C Ryan (1f) 0-2 each, P Maher & S Walsh 0-1 each

Dunlo GAA Grounds, Ballinasloe
Referee: Paud O Dwyer
9 February 2014
14:00
Semi-final

Leinster	8-18 - 1-21	Ulster
C Fennelly 2-2, J Bergin 2-0, E Larkin 1-3 (1f), P Ryan (1-0 pen), J Guiney 1-2 each, R O'Dwyer 1-1, D Currams 0-3, P Murphy, C Keaney 0-2 each, J McCaffrey 0-1	Report	P Shiels 1-5 (1-4fs), N McManus 0-5 (0-1 pen), N McKenna, C Clarke 0-4 each, C Woods, A Grant, D McKernan 0-1 each

St. Loman's Park, Trim
Referee: John Keane

==== Final ====
1 March 2014
17:00
Final

Connacht	0-16 - 1-23	Leinster
C Cooney 0-8, J Flynn 0-2, R Commins 0-2, N Healy 0-2, P Brehony 0-1, P Landers 0-1	Report	E Larkin 0-12 (5f, 4 '65), C Fennelly 0-3, L Ryan 0-3, R O'Dwyer 1-0, C Keaney 0-2, R Hogan 0-1, W Walsh 0-1, D Currams 0-1

Croke Park, Dublin
Referee: Eamon Hasson

== Bibliography ==
- Results and fixtures
