= 1936 Railway Cup Hurling Championship =

Irish hurling competition

1936 Railway Cup
- Dates: 16 February 1936 – 17 March 1936
- Teams: 3
- Champions: Leinster (4th title); Paddy Larkin (captain)
- Runners-up: Munster; Mick Mackey (captain)

Tournament statistics
- Matches played: 2
- Goals scored: 9 (4.5 per match)
- Points scored: 23 (11.5 per match)
- Top scorer(s): Johnny Dunne (2-02)

The 1936 Railway Cup Hurling Championship was the 10th staging of the Railway Cup since its establishment by the Gaelic Athletic Association in 1927. The cup began on 16 February 1936 and ended on 17 March 1936.

Munster were the defending champions.

On 17 March 1936, Leinster won the cup following a 2-08 to 3-04 defeat of Munster in the final at Croke Park. This was their fifth Railway Cup title overall and their first title since 1933.

== Teams ==
Province	Captain
Connacht	Mick Gill
Leinster	Paddy Larkin
Munster	Mick Mackey

== Results ==
=== Semi-final ===
16 February 1936 Semi-final	Leinster	2-07 - 2-04	Connacht	St. Cronan's Park, Roscrea
	N Wade 1-1, J Dunne 1-0, E Byrne 0-3, M Daniels 0-2, J Walsh 0-1.		G O'Reilly 1-0, J Greene 1-0, I Harney 0-2, P Iclan 0-1, M Gill 0-1.	Referee: P Purcell (Tipperary)

=== Final ===
17 March 1936 Final	Leinster	2-08 - 3-04	Munster	Croke Park, Dublin
	J Dunne 1-2, M Power 1-0, J Walsh 0-2, E Byrne 0-2, P Whelan 0-1, T Leahy 0-1,		P McMahon 1-0, M Hennessy 1-0, M Brennan 1-0, M Mackey 0-2, T Ryan 0-2.	Attendance: 20,000; Referee: S McKeown (Antrim)

== Sources ==
- Donegan, Des, The Complete Handbook of Gaelic Games (DBA Publications Limited, 2005).
