= 1929 Railway Cup Hurling Championship =

Irish hurling competition

- Date: 17 March 1929
- Teams: 3
- Champions: Munster (2nd title); Seán Óg Murphy (captain)
- Runners-up: Leinster; Mick Gill (captain)

Tournament statistics
- Matches played: 1
- Goals scored: 8 (8 per match)
- Points scored: 4 (4 per match)
- Top scorer(s): Connie Keane (3-01)

The 1929 Railway Cup Hurling Championship was the third series of the inter-provincial hurling Railway Cup. One match was played on 17 March 1929 to decide the title. It was contested by Leinster and Munster. Connacht were struck out of the tournament.

Munster entered the championship as the defending champions.

On 17 March 1929, Munster won the Railway Cup after a 5-03 to 3-01 defeat of Leinster in the final at Croke Park, Dublin. This was their second title over all and their second title in succession.

Munster's Connie Keane was the Railway Cup top scorer with 3-01.

== Participants ==
The teams involved were:

Province	Captain
Leinster	Mick Gill
Munster	Seán Óg Murphy

== Results ==
=== Final ===
17 March 1929 Final	Munster	5-03 - 3-01	Leinster	Croke Park, Dublin
	C Keane 3-1, M Kennedy 1-0, E Coughlan 1-0, P Cahill 0-1, Ahern 0-1.		T Barry 2-0, D O'Neill 1-0, M Gill 0-1,

== Sources ==
- Donegan, Des, The Complete Handbook of Gaelic Games (DBA Publications Limited, 2005).
