= 1930 Railway Cup Hurling Championship =

Championship

1930 Railway Cup
- Date: 17 March 1930
- Teams: 2
- Champions: Munster (3rd title); Dinny Barry-Murphy (captain)
- Runners-up: Leinster; Wattie Dunphy (captain)

Tournament statistics
- Matches played: 1
- Goals scored: 6 (6 per match)
- Points scored: 13 (13 per match)
- Top scorer(s): Tommy Treacy (3-00)

The 1930 Railway Cup Hurling Championship was the fourth series of the inter-provincial hurling Railway Cup. One match was played on 17 March 1930 to decide the title. It was contested by Leinster and Munster.

Munster entered the championship as the defending champions.

On 17 March 1930, Munster won the Railway Cup after a 4-06 to 2-07 defeat of Leinster in the final at Croke Park, Dublin. This was their second title over all and their third title in succession.

Munster's Tommy Treacy was the Railway Cup top scorer with 3-00.

== Teams ==
Province	Captain
Leinster	Wattie Dunphy
Munster	Dinny Barry-Murphy

== Results ==
=== Final ===
17 March 1930 Final	Munster	4-06 - 2-07	Leinster	Croke Park, Dublin
	T Treacy 3-0, M Kennedy 1-1, P Cahill 0-2, J Hurley 0-1, T Considine 0-1, M Cross 0-1.		S Thompson 1-0, P Walsh 1-0, L Meagher 0-2, Martin Power 0-2, M Gill 0-2, Matty Power 0-1.	Attendance: 10,552

== Sources ==
- Donegan, Des, The Complete Handbook of Gaelic Games (DBA Publications Limited, 2005).
