= 1992 Railway Cup Hurling Championship =

Irish hurling competition

1992 Railway Cup
- Date: 14 March 1992 - 15 March 1992
- Teams: Connacht; Leinster; Munster; Ulster
- Champions: Munster (38th title); Noel Sheehy (captain)
- Runners-up: Ulster

Tournament statistics
- Matches played: 4
- Goals scored: 10 (2.5 per match)
- Points scored: 79 (19.75 per match)
- Top scorer(s): Eamon Morrissey (2-05)

The 1992 Railway Cup Hurling Championship was the 64th series of the inter-provincial hurling Railway Cup. Four matches were played between 14 March 1992 and 15 March 1992 to decide the title. It was contested by Connacht, Leinster, Munster and Ulster.

Connacht entered the championship as the defending champions, however, they were defeated by Ulster at the semi-final stage.

On 15 March 1992, Munster won the Railway Cup after a 3–12 to 1–08 defeat of Ulster in the final at Nowlan Park, Kilkenny. It was their 38th Railway Cup title overall and their first title since 1985.

Leinster's Eamon Morrissey was the Railway Cup top scorer with 2-05.

== Results ==
Semi-finals

| 14 March 1992 Semi-final | Ulster | 2-06 - 0-07 | Connacht | Nowlan Park, Kilkenny |
| | N Sands 1-1, C Barr 1-0, P Jennings 0-1, P McKillen 0-1, A McCarry 0-1, K Coulter 0-1, S Downey 0-1. | | M Coleman 0-4, É Burke 0-2, M McGrath 0-1. | Attendance: 3,500; Referee: A Mac Suibhne (Dublin) |

| 14 March 1992 Semi-final | Munster | 1-12 - 0-10 | Leinster | Nowlan Park, Kilkenny |
| | G Kirby 1-4, C Carey 0-3, A Ryan 0-2, M Cleary 0-2, D Carr 0-1. | | É Morrissey 0-4, B McMahon 0-2, DJ Carey 0-2, J Power 0-1, R Mannion 0-1. | Attendance: 3,500; Referee: J Cody (Galway) |

Shield final

| 15 March 1992 Final | Leinster | 3-09 - 0-15 | Conancht | Nowlan Park, Kilkenny |
| | É Morrissey 2-1, J Dooley 1-0, DJ Carey 0-3, M Mullins 0-2, P Kelly 0-1, M Phelan 0-1, T Dempsey 0-1. | | E Burke 0-7, A O'Donoghue 0-2, M Coleman 0-2, L Burke 0-1, B Keogh 0-1, M McGrath 0-1, R Duane 0-1. | Referee: J O'Leary (Cork) |

Final

| 15 March 1992 Final | Munster | 3-12 - 1-08 | Ulster | Nowlan Park, Kilkenny |
| | M Cleary 1-2, C Walsh 1-1, A Ryan 0-4, M Houlihan 1-0, G Kirby 0-2, J O'Connell 0-1, C Carey 0-1, B O'Sullivan 0-1. | | S Downey 1-2, O McFetridge 0-2, D Hughes 0-1, J Carson 0-1, N Sands 0-1, G O'Kane 0-1. | Referee: A Mac Suibhne (Dublin) |

== Top scorers ==
Overall

| Rank | Player | County | Tally | Total | Matches | Average |
|---|---|---|---|---|---|---|
| 1 | Eamon Morrissey | Leinster | 2-05 | 11 | 2 | 5.50 |

== Sources ==
- Donegan, Des, The Complete Handbook of Gaelic Games (DBA Publications Limited, 2005).
