= 1927 Railway Cup Hurling Championship =

Irish hurling competition

- Dates: 21 November 1926 – 17 March 1927
- Teams: 3
- Champions: Leinster (1st title); Tommy Daly (captain)
- Runners-up: Munster; Seán Óg Murphy (captain)

Tournament statistics
- Matches played: 2
- Goals scored: 13 (6.5 per match)
- Points scored: 28 (14 per match)
- Top scorer(s): Din O'Neill (5-04)

The 1927 Railway Cup Hurling Championship was the inaugural series of the inter-provincial hurling Railway Cup. Two matches were played between 26 November 1926 and 17 March 1927. It was contested by Connacht, Leinster and Munster.

Leinster were the inaugural winners of the Railway Cup after defeating Connacht in the semi-final and Munster in the final at Croke Park, Dublin on 17 March 1927.

Leinster's Din O'Neill was the Railway Cup top scorer with 5-04.

== Teams ==
Province	Captain(s)
Connacht	Ignatius Harney
Leinster	Dick Grace / Tommy Daly
Munster	Seán Óg Murphy

== Results ==
=== Semi-final ===
21 November 1926 Semi-final	Leinster	7-06 - 3-05	Connacht	O'Moore Park, Portlaoise
	D O'Neill 5-1, M Power 1-0, G Howard 1-0, H Meagher 0-3, L Meagher 0-1, D Walsh 0-1,		M King 1-1, J Deely 1-0, M Gilligan 1-0, I Harney 0-3, J Shaughnessy 0-1.	Referee: P Dunphy (Dublin)

=== Final ===
17 March 1927 Final	Munster	2-06 - 1-11	Leinster	Croke Park, Dublin
	P Ahern 1-0, M Kennedy 1-0, E Coughlan 0-3, P Cahill 0-1, W Gleeson 0-1, M Ahern 0-1.		M Power 1-2, D O'Neill 0-3, L Meagher 0-3, J Meagher 0-1, J Roberts 0-1, H Meagher 0-1.	Referee: S Jordan (Galway)

== Top scorers ==
Top scorers overall

Rank	Player	County	Tally	Total	Matches	Average
1	Din O'Neill	Leinster	5-04	19	2	9.50
2	Matty Power	Leinster	2-02	8	2	4.00
3	Mick King	Connacht	1-01	4	1	4.00
3	Lory Meagher	Leinster	0-04	4	2	2.00
3	Henry Meagher	Leinster	0-04	4	2	2.00

== Sources ==
- Donegan, Des, The Complete Handbook of Gaelic Games (DBA Publications Limited, 2005).
