= 1960 Railway Cup Hurling Championship =

Irish hurling competition

1960 Railway Cup
- Date: 21 February - 17 March 1960
- Teams: Connacht; Leinster; Munster
- Champions: Munster; Frankie Walsh (captain)
- Runners-up: Leinster

Tournament statistics
- Matches played: 3
- Goals scored: 27 (9 per match)
- Points scored: 43 (14.33 per match)
- Top scorer: Paddy Barry (4-01)

The 1960 Railway Cup Hurling Championship was the 34th series of the inter-provincial hurling Railway Cup. Three matches were played between 21 February 1960 and 17 March 1960 to decide the title. It was contested by Connacht, Leinster, Ulster and Munster.

Munster entered the championship as the defending champions.

On 17 March 1960, Munster won the Railway Cup after a 6-06 to 2-07 defeat of Leinster in the final at Croke Park, Dublin. It was their fourth Railway Cup title in succession.

Munster's Paddy Barry was the Railway Cup top scorer with 4-01.

== Results ==
Semi-finals

21 February 1960 Semi-final	Munster	5-12 - 1-09	Connacht	Gaelic Grounds, Limerick
	P Barry 2-1, Jimmy Doyle 2-0, C Ring 1-2, J Smyth 0-3, F Walsh 0-3, T Cheasty 0-1, John Doyle 0-1, S Power 0-1.		PJ Lawless 1-0, T Sweeney 0-3, T Conway 0-1, S Gohery 0-1, G O'Malley 0-1, J Conroy 0-1, F Egan 0-1, J Salmon 0-1.	Attendance: 5,000; Referee: S Spain (Offaly)

21 February 1960 Leinster 8-6 - 5-3 Ulster Semi-final

Final

17 March 1960 Final	Leinster	2-07 - 6-06	Munster	Croke Park, Dublin
	P Kehoe 0-6, C O'Brien 1-0, S Clohessy 1-0, T O'Connell 0-1.		P Barry 2-0, J Smyth 2-0, F Walsh 1-1, P Grimes 1-0, Jimmy Doyle 0-2, C Ring 0-2, T Cheasty 0-1.	Attendance: 40,473; Referee: C Foley (Dublin)

== Top scorers ==
=== Overall ===
Rank	Player	County	Tally	Total	Matches	Average
1	Paddy Barry	Munster	4-01	13	2	6.50
2	Jimmy Smyth	Munster	2-03	9	2	4.50
3	Jimmy Doyle	Munster	2-02	8	2	4.00
4	Frankie Walsh	Munster	1-04	7	2	3.50
4	Christy Ring	Munster	1-04	7	2	3.50

=== Single game ===
Rank	Player	County	Tally	Total	Opposition
1	Paddy Barry	Munster	2-01	7	Connacht
2	Jimmy Doyle	Munster	2-00	6	Connacht
2	Paddy Barry	Munster	2-00	6	Leinster
2	Jimmy Smyth	Munster	2-00	6	Leinster
2	Padge Kehoe	Leinster	0-06	6	Munster
