= 1934 Railway Cup Hurling Championship =

Irish hurling championship

1934 Railway Cup
- Dates: 25 February 1934 – 17 March 1934
- Teams: 3
- Champions: Munster (5th title); Timmy Ryan (captain)
- Runners-up: Leinster; Johnny Dunne (captain)

Tournament statistics
- Matches played: 2
- Goals scored: 20 (10 per match)
- Points scored: 17 (8.5 per match)
- Top scorer(s): Jimmy Walsh (3-02)

The 1934 Railway Cup Hurling Championship was the seventh staging of the Railway Cup since its establishment by the Gaelic Athletic Association in 1927. The cup began on 25 February 1934 and ended on 17 March 1934.

Leinster were the defending champions.

On 17 March 1976, Munster won the cup following a 4-03 to 3-02 defeat of Leinster in the final at Croke Park. This was their fifth Railway Cup title overall and their first title since 1931.

== Results ==
=== Semi-final ===
25 February 1934 Semi-final	Leinster	7–06 – 4–06	Connacht	St. Cronan's Park, Roscrea
	J Walsh 3-1, J Dunne 2-0, Hegarty 1-2, Mattie Power 1-1, Martin Power 0-1, Fitzpatrick 0-1.		M King 2-3, A Kelly 2-0, Hardy 0-1, M Gill 0-1.

=== Final ===
17 March 1934 Final	Leinster	3–02 – 6–03	Munster	Croke Park, Dublin
	Mattie Power 1-1, J Dunne 1-0, Fitzpatrick 1-0, J Walsh 0-1.		M Mackey 3-0, D Wyse 2-0, M Kennedy 1-0, T Treacy 0-1, J Kenneally 0-1, L Blake 0-1.	Attendance: 17,000; Referee: S Jordan (Galway)

== Top scorers ==
Top scorers overall

Rank	Player	Club	Tally	Total	Matches	Average
1	Jimmy Walsh	Leinster	3-02	11	2	5.50
2	Mick Mackey	Munster	3-00	9	1	9.00
2	Johnny Dunne	Leinster	3-00	9	2	4.50
2	Mick King	Connacht	2-03	9	1	9.00
3	Matty Power	Leinster	2-02	8	2	4.00

== Bibliography ==
- Donegan, Des, The Complete Handbook of Gaelic Games (DBA Publications Limited, 2005).
