= 1953 Railway Cup Hurling Championship =

1953 Irish sports competition

1953 Railway Cup
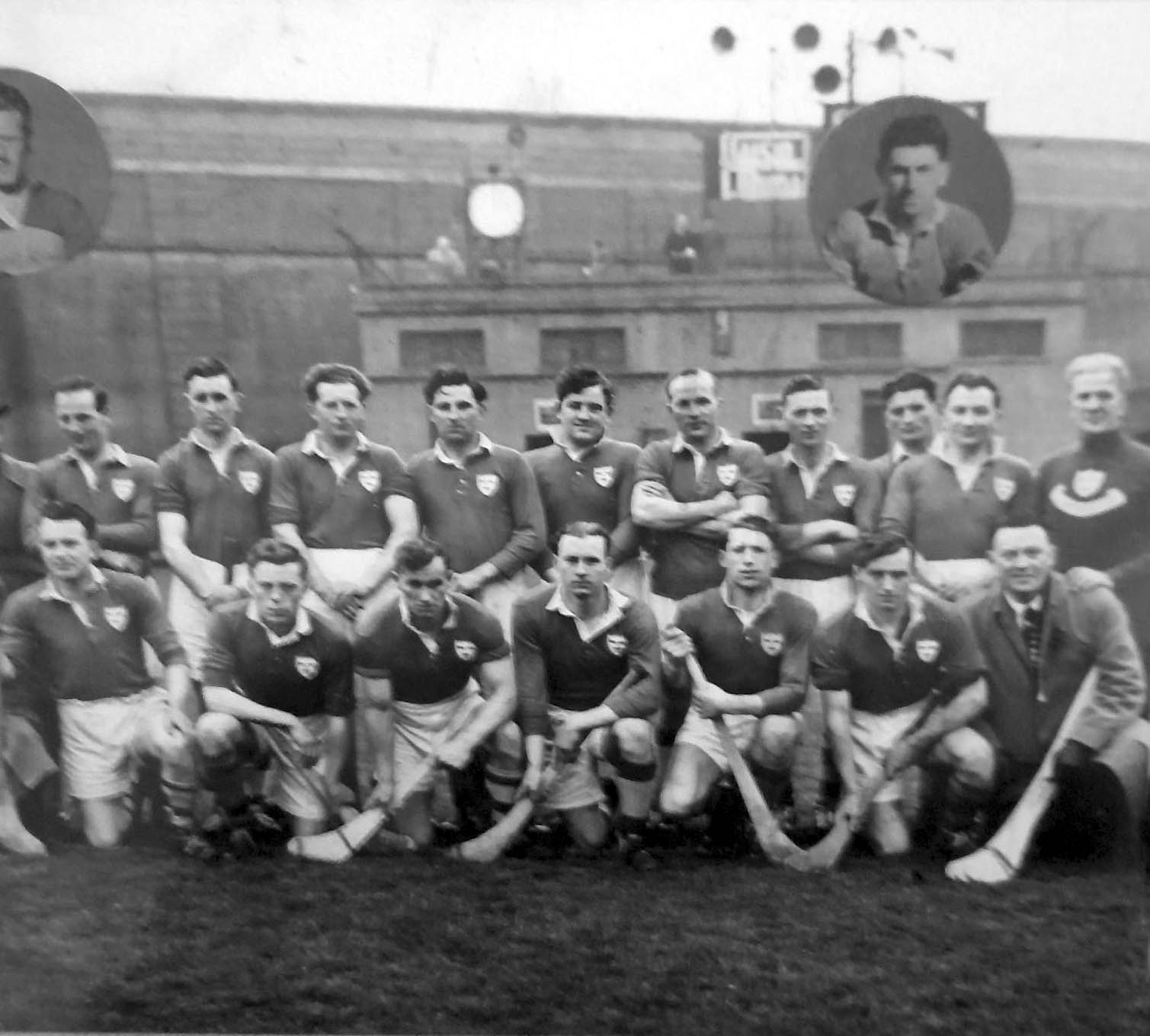
- Winning Munster team
- Date: 8 February 1953 - 17 March 1953
- Teams: Connacht; Leinster; Munster; Ulster
- Champions: Munster (21st title); Christy Ring (captain)
- Runners-up: Leinster

Tournament statistics
- Matches played: 3
- Goals scored: 30 (10 per match)
- Points scored: 35 (11.67 per match)
- Top scorer(s): Christy Ring (3-05)

The 1953 Railway Cup Hurling Championship was the 27th series of the inter-provincial hurling Railway Cup. Three matches were played between 8 February 1953 and 17 March 1953 to decide the title. It was contested by Connacht, Leinster, Munster and Ulster.

Munster entered the championship as the defending champions.

On 17 March 1953, Munster won the Railway Cup after a 5-07 to 5-05 defeat over Leinster in the final at Croke Park, Dublin. It was their 21st Railway Cup title overall and their sixth title in succession.

Munster's Christy Ring was the Railway Cup top scorer with 3-05.

== Results ==
Semi-finals

8 February 1953 Semi-final	Munster	8-06 - 1-05	Ulster	Croke Park, Dublin
	C Ring 3-2, D McCarthy 3-0, WJ Daly 1-3, P Kenny 1-0, J Fives 0-1.		K Armstrong 1-0, S McDonnell 0-1, A Coulter 0-1, B Elliott 0-1, C Lynn 0-1, P Mullaney 0-1.	Referee: D O'Shea (Dublin)

22 February 1953 Semi-final	Leinster	7-09 - 4-03	Connacht	O'Moore Park, Portlaoise
	Paddy Kehoe 3-3, N Wheeler 2-1, T Maher 1-2, T Flood 1-1, C Murphy 0-1, N Rackard 0-1.		Nolan 3-0, McInerney 1-0, J Gallagher 0-2, Killeen 0-1.	Attendance: 8,415; Referee: C Murphy (Cork)

Final

17 March 1953 Final	Munster	5-07 - 5-05	Leinster	Croke Park, Dublin
	S Bannon 2-0, P Stakelum 1-3, M Nugent 1-0, D McCarthy 1-0, C Ring 0-3, WJ Daly 0-1.		N Rackard 2-0, N Wheeler 2-0, T Flood 1-1, Walsh 0-2, B Rackard 0-1, N Allen 0-1.	Attendance: 41,180; Referee: J Gallagher (Galway)

== Railway Cup statistics ==
=== Top scorers ===
Overall

Rank	Player	County	Tally	Total	Matches	Average
1	Christy Ring	Munster	3-05	14	2	7.00
2	Ned Wheeler	Leinster	4-01	13	2	6.50
3	Derry McCarthy	Munster	4-00	12	2	6.00
3	Paddy Kehoe	Leinster	3-03	12	2	6.00

Single game

Rank	Player	County	Tally	Total	Opposition
1	Paddy Kehoe	Leinster	3-03	12	Connacht
2	Christy Ring	Munster	3-02	11	Ulster
3	Derry McCarthy	Munster	3-00	9	Ulster
3	P. Nolan	Connacht	3-00	9	Leinster

=== Miscellaneous ===
- In the semi-final between Munster and Ulster, the referee, Dick O'Shea, blew the full-time whistle with 8 minutes of the second half remaining. Munster were leading by 22 points at that stage.

== Sources ==
- Donegan, Des, The Complete Handbook of Gaelic Games (DBA Publications Limited, 2005).
