= 1942 Railway Cup Hurling Championship =

Irish hurling competition

1942 Railway Cup
- Dates: 15 February – 17 March 1942
- Teams: Connacht; Leinster; Munster
- Champions: Munster (10th title)

Tournament statistics
- Matches played: 2
- Goals scored: 19 (9.5 per match)
- Points scored: 29 (14.5 per match)
- Top scorer(s): Mossy McDonnell (4-06)

The 1942 Railway Cup Hurling Championship was the 16th series of the Railway Cup, an annual hurling championship organised by the Gaelic Athletic Association. The championship took place between 15 February and 17 March 1942. It was contested by Connacht, Leinster and Munster.

Leinster entered the championship as the defending champions.

On 17 March 1942, Munster won the Railway Cup after a 4-09 to 4-05 defeat of Leinster in the final at Croke Park, Dublin. It was their 10th Railway Cup title overall and their first since 1940. Christy Ring made his first appearance for Munster in the final and won the first of a record 18 Railway Cup winners' medals.

Leinster's Mossy McDonnell was the Railway Cup's top scorer with 4-06.

== Results ==
Semi-final

15 February 1942 Semi-final	Connacht	4-07 - 7-08	Leinster	Duggan Park, Ballinasloe
	MJ Flaherty 0-6, B Mooney 1-1, L Connaire 1-0, M Duggan 1-0, T Doyle 1-0.		M McDonnell 1-5, J Langton 2-1, C Downes 1-0, N Wade 1-0, J Mulcahy 1-0, P Larkin 1-0, J Walsh 0-1, J Byrne 0-1.	Referee: M Hennessy (Clare)

Final

17 March 1942 Final	Munster	4-09 - 4-05	Leinster	Croke Park, Dublin
	J Power 2-0, J Lynch 0-4, B O'Donnell 1-0, C Moylan 1-0, C Ring 0-3, W Barron 0-1, D Stokes 0-1.		M McDonnell 3-1, F White 1-0, J Mulcahy 0-2, P Phelan 0-1, J Langton 0-1.

== Top scorers ==
Overall

Rank	Player	County	Tally	Total	Matches	Average
1	Mossy McDonnell	Leinster	4-06	18	2	9.00
2	Jim Langton	Leinster	2-02	8	2	4.00
3	Jackie Power	Munster	2-00	6	1	6.00

Single game

Rank	Player	County	Tally	Total	Opposition
1	Mossy McDonnell	Leinster	3-01	10	Munster
2	Mossy McDonnell	Leinster	1-05	8	Connacht
3	Jim Langton	Leinster	2-01	7	Connacht
4	Jackie Power	Munster	2-00	6	Leinster
5	M. J. Flaherty	Connacht	0-06	6	Leinster

== Sources ==
- Donegan, Des, The Complete Handbook of Gaelic Games (DBA Publications Limited, 2005).
