= 1983 Railway Cup Hurling Championship =

Irish hurling competition

- Dates: 6 February 1983 - 17 March 1983
- Teams: 4
- Champions: Connacht (4th title); Sylvie Linnane (captain)
- Runners-up: Leinster; Noel Skehan (captain)

Tournament statistics
- Matches played: 3
- Goals scored: 6 (2 per match)
- Points scored: 57 (19 per match)
- Top scorer(s): Liam Fennelly (2-03)

The 1983 Railway Cup Hurling Championship was the 57th staging of the Railway Cup since its establishment by the Gaelic Athletic Association in 1927. The cup began on 6 February 1983 and ended on 17 March 1983.

Connacht were the defending champions.

On 17 March 1983, Connacht won the cup after a 0-10 to 1-05 defeat of Leinster in the final at Breffni Park. This was their fourth Railway Cup title overall and their second title in succession.

== Results ==
=== Semi-finals ===
6 February 1983 Semi-final	Leinster	3-16 - 1-08	Ulster	Croke Park, Dublin
	L Fennelly 2-2, P Carroll 0-7, S Kinsella 1-1, B Fitzpatrick 0-3, G Fennelly 0-1, S Kinsella 0-1, M Cuddy 0-1.		D Donnelly 1-3, A McNaughton 0-2, B Donnelly 0-2, P Boyle 0-1.	Referee: S Brennan (Galway)

6 February 1983 Semi-final	Munster	0-09 - 1-09	Connacht	Gaelic Grounds, Limerick
	P Horgan 0-3, J Greene 0-2, M Walsh 0-2, T Crowley 0-1, T Casey 0-1.		B Forde 1-3, PJ Molloy 0-4, F Burke 0-1, N Lane 0-1.	Referee: P Long (Kilkenny)

=== Final ===
17 March 1983 Final	Connacht	0-10 - 1-05	Leinster	Breffni Park, Cavan
	I Clarke 0-2, M Connolly 0-2, N Lane 0-2, PJ Molloy 0-2, B Lynskey 0-2.		M Cuddy 1-0, B Fitzpatrick 0-2, P Delaney 0-1, P Carroll 0-1, L Fennelly 0-1.	Referee: G Ryan (Tipperary)

== Scoring statistics ==
Top scorers overall

Rank	Player	Club	Tally	Total	Matches	Average
1	Liam Fennelly	Leinster	2-03	9	2	4.50
2	Pat Carroll	Leinster	0-08	8	2	4.00
3	Dinny Donnelly	Ulster	1-03	6	1	6.00
3	Bernie Forde	Connacht	1-03	6	2	3.00

== Bibliography ==
- Donegan, Des, The Complete Handbook of Gaelic Games (DBA Publications Limited, 2005).
