= 1938 Railway Cup Hurling Championship =

Irish hurling competition

1938 Railway Cup
- Dates: 20 February – 17 March 1938
- Teams: Connacht; Leinster; Munster
- Champions: Munster (8th title)

Tournament statistics
- Matches played: 3
- Goals scored: 20 (6.67 per match)
- Points scored: 25 (8.33 per match)
- Top scorer(s): Mick Daniels (3-01)

The 1938 Railway Cup Hurling Championship was the 12th series of the Railway Cup, an annual hurling championship organised by the Gaelic Athletic Association. The championship took place between 20 February and 17 March 1938. It was contested by Connacht, Leinster and Munster.

Munster entered the championship as the defending champions.

On 17 March 1938, Munster won the Railway Cup after a 6-02 to 4-03 defeat of Leinster in the final at Croke Park, Dublin. It was their 8th Railway Cup title overall and their second in succession.

Leinster's Mick Daniels was the Railway Cup's top scorer with 3-01.

== Results ==
Semi-finals

20 February 1938 Semi-final	Conancht	3-06 - 3-06	Leinster	Duggan Park, Ballinasloe
	MJ Flaherty 1-0, W Cullinane 2-0, M Gill Snr 0-3, J Donohue 0-1, T Molloy 0-1, M Gill Jnr 0-1.		M Daniels 2-1, H Gray 1-0, M Leahy 0-1, N Wade 0-1, C McMahon 0-1, E Moynihan 0-1, T Leahy 0-1.	Referee: M Hennessy (Clare)

27 February 1938 Semi-final replay	Leinster	4-05 - 0-03	Connacht	O'Connor Park, Tullamore
	W Delaney 2-0, N Wade 1-1, Mccormack 1-0, P Phelan 0-3, T Leahy 0-1,		Burke 0-2, M Gill Snr 0-1.	Referee: M Hennessy (Clare)

Final

17 March 1938 Final	Munster	6-02 - 4-03	Leinster	Croke Park, Dublin
	J Quirke 3-0, J Mackey 1-1, T Ryan 1-0, J Barrett 1-0, M Mackey 0-1,		W Delaney 1-0, N Wade 1-0, M Daniels 1-0, C McMahon 1-0, P Phelan 0-2, T Leahy 0-1.	Attendance: 18,120

== Top scorers ==
Overall

Rank	Player	County	Tally	Total	Matches	Average
1	Mick Daniels	Leinster	3-01	10	3	3.33
2	Johnny Quirke	Munster	3-00	9	1	9.00
2	Willie Delaney	Leinster	3-00	9	3	3.00

Single game

Rank	Player	County	Tally	Total	Opposition
1	Johnny Quirke	Munster	3-00	9	Leinster
2	Mick Daniels	Leinster	2-01	7	Connacht
3	Willie Delaney	Leinster	2-00	6	Connacht
3	Willie Cullinane	Connacht	2-00	6	Leinster

== Sources ==
- Donegan, Des, The Complete Handbook of Gaelic Games (DBA Publications Limited, 2005).
