= 1944 Railway Cup Hurling Championship =

Irish hurling competition

1944 Railway Cup
- Dates: 13 February – 17 March 1944
- Teams: Connacht; Leinster; Munster; Ulster
- Champions: Munster (12th title)

Tournament statistics
- Matches played: 3

The 1944 Railway Cup Hurling Championship was the 18th series of the Railway Cup, an annual hurling tournament and organised by the Gaelic Athletic Association. The tournament took place between 13 February and 17 March 1944.

Four teams participated in the championship. These included all of the four historic provinces of Ireland, Connacht, Leinster, Munster and Ulster.

The tournament was won by Munster.

== Results ==
Semi-final

13 February 1944 Semi-final	Leinster	1-05 - 4-05	Connacht	St. Brendan's Park, Birr
	S O'Brien 1-0, T Walsh 0-2, J Langton 0-2, N Rackard 0-1.		Brennan 1-3, M Nestor 1-2, Fennessy 1-0, MJ Flaherty 1-0.	Referee: M Heffernan (Tipperary)

20 February 1944 Semi-final	Munster	9-03 - 3-01	Ulster	Croke Park, Dublin
	D Stokes 2-0, C Ring 2-0, J Quirke 2-0, PJ Quane 1-2, J Mackey 1-0, J Young 1-0, J Lynch 0-1.		D McAllister 2-0, S Mulholland 1-0, B Clarkin 0-1.

Final

17 March 1944 Final	Connacht	4-04 - 4-10	Munster	Croke Park, Dublin
	M Nestor 2-0, Fennessy 1-0, T Brennan 1-0, P Thornton 0-1, R Forde 0-1, J Gallagher 0-1, D Flynn 0-1.		J Mackey 2-0, S Condon 1-2, J Quirke 1-1, J Lynch 0-4, D Stokes 0-2, PJ Quane 0-1.

== Top scorers ==
Overall

Rank	Player	County	Tally	Total	Matches	Average
1	M. Nestor	Connacht	3-02	11	2	5.50
2	Johnny Quirke	Munster	3-01	10	2	5.00
3	John Mackey	Munster	3-00	9	2	4.50
3	Tony Brennan	Connacht	2-03	9	2	4.50

Single game

Rank	Player	County	Tally	Total	Opposition
1	Dick Stokes	Munster	2-00	6	Ulster
1	Christy Ring	Munster	2-00	6	Ulster
1	Johnny Quirke	Munster	2-00	6	Ulster
1	Danny McAllister	Ulster	2-00	6	Munster
1	M. Nestor	Connacht	2-00	6	Munster
1	John Mackey	Munster	2-00	6	Connacht
1	Tony Brennan	Connacht	1-03	6	Leinster
2	M. Nestor	Connacht	1-02	5	Leinster
2	P. J. Quane	Munster	1-02	5	Ulster
2	Seán Condon	Munster	1-02	5	Connacht

== Sources ==
- Donegan, Des, The Complete Handbook of Gaelic Games (DBA Publications Limited, 2005).
