= 1941 Railway Cup Hurling Championship =

Irish hurling competition

1941 Railway Cup
- Dates: 16 February – 16 March 1941
- Teams: Connacht; Leinster; Munster
- Champions: Leinster (5th title); Bobby Hinks (captain)

Tournament statistics
- Matches played: 2
- Goals scored: 11 (5.5 per match)
- Points scored: 20 (10 per match)
- Top scorer(s): Jack Lynch (2-02)

The 1941 Railway Cup Hurling Championship was the 15th series of the Railway Cup, an annual hurling championship organised by the Gaelic Athletic Association. The championship took place between 16 February and 16 March 1941. It was contested by Connacht, Leinster and Munster.

Munster entered the championship as the defending champions.

On 16 March 1941, Leinster won the Railway Cup after a 2–05 to 2–04 defeat of Munster in the final at Croke Park, Dublin. It was their 6th Railway Cup title overall and their first since 1936.

Munster's Jack Lynch was the Railway Cup's top scorer with 2-02.

== Results ==
Semi-final

16 February 1941 Semi-final	Connacht	0–06 – 7–05	Munster	Pearse Stadium, Salthill
	M O'Leary 0–2, MJ Flaherty 0–2, B Mooney 0–1, P Thornton 0–1.		J Mullane 2–0, J Lynch 2–0, J Quirke 1–2, M Mackey 1–1, J Mackey 1–1, D Stokes 0–1.	Referee: J Flaherty (Offaly)

Final

16 March 1941 Final	Leinster	2–05 – 2–04	Munster	Croke Park, Dublin
	J Langton 1–2, P McSweeney 1–1, J Kelly 0–1, J Mulcahy 0–1.		C Buckley 1–0, J Power 1–0, J Lynch 0–2, B Campbell 0–1, J Quirke 0–1.	Referee: M King (Galway)

== Top scorers ==
Overall

Rank	Player	County	Tally	Total	Matches	Average
1	Jack Lynch	Munster	2-02	8	2	4.00
2	Jim Mullane	Munster	2-00	6	2	3.00
2	Johnny Quirke	Munster	1-03	6	2	3.00

Single game

Rank	Player	County	Tally	Total	Opposition
1	Jim Mullane	Munster	2-00	6	Connacht
1	Jack Lynch	Munster	2-00	6	Connacht
2	Johnny Quirke	Munster	1-02	5	Connacht
2	Jim Langton	Leinster	1-02	5	Munster
3	Mick Mackey	Munster	1-01	4	Connacht
3	John Mackey	Munster	1-01	4	Connacht
3	Paddy McSweeeny	Leinster	1-01	4	Munster

== Sources ==
- Donegan, Des, The Complete Handbook of Gaelic Games (DBA Publications Limited, 2005).
