= 1997 Railway Cup Hurling Championship =

Irish hurling competition

- Dates: 8 November 1997 - 9 November 1997
- Teams: 4
- Champions: Munster (41st title); Brian Lohan (captain)
- Runners-up: Leinster

Tournament statistics
- Matches played: 3
- Goals scored: 6 (2 per match)
- Points scored: 83 (27.67 per match)
- Top scorer(s): Johnny Dooley (0-18)

The 1997 Railway Cup Hurling Championship was the 69th staging of the Railway Cup since its establishment by the Gaelic Athletic Association in 1927. The cup began on 8 November 1997, and ended on 9 November 1997.

Munster were the defending champions.

On 9 November 1997, Munster won the cup after a 0-14 to 0–10 defeat of Leinster in the final at Duggan Park. This was their 41st Railway Cup title overall and their third title in succession.

== Results ==
=== Semi-finals ===
8 November 1997 Semi-final	Leinster	2-16 - 1-09	Ulster	Duggan Park, Ballinasloe
	Johnny Dooley 0-8, C Carter 1-3, N Moloney 1-0, D Rooney 0-3, R McCarthy 0-2.		Greg O'Kane 0-5, B Coulter 1-0, G McGrattan 0-1, J Carson 0-1, A Elliott 0-1, M Coulter 0-1.	Referee: J Cooney (Galway)

8 November 1997 Semi-final	Connacht	2-15 - 1-19	Munster	Duggan Park, Ballinasloe
	O Fahy 2-1, E Cloonan 0-6, J Rabbitte 0-3, M Cullinane 0-2, M Coleman 0-2, K Flaherty 0-1.		M Galligan 0-9, L Cahill 1-1, K McGrath 0-2, S McGrath 0-2, L Doyle 0-1, M Foley 0-1, PJ O'Connell 0-1, O Moran 0-1, N Gilligan 0-1.	Referee: T McIntyre (Antrim)

=== Final ===
9 November 1997 Final	Munster	0-14 - 0-10	Leinster	Duggan Park, Ballinasloe
	M Galligan 0-7, T Dunne 0-2, N Gilligan 0-2, C Lynch 0-1, K McGrath 0-1, S McGrath 0-1.		Johnny Dooley 0-10.

== Bibliography ==
- Donegan, Des, The Complete Handbook of Gaelic Games (DBA Publications Limited, 2005).
