= GAA Interprovincial Championship =

Interprovincial championship

A Railway Cup medal (1995)

The GAA Interprovincial Championship (Irish: An Corn Idir-Chúigeach) or Railway Cup (Corn an Iarnróid) is the name of two annual Gaelic football and hurling competitions held between the provinces of Ireland. The Connacht, Leinster, Munster and Ulster GAA teams are composed of the best players from the counties in each province. The games are organised by the Gaelic Athletic Association.

The Railway Cup was a revival of the Railway Shield which ran from 1905 to 1907 (football) and from 1905 to 1908 (hurling). The first Railway Cup competitions (the name is due to the donation of the trophy by Irish Rail) were held in 1927, with Munster winning the first football title and Leinster winning the first hurling title. Presently, Ulster hold the record for the most football Railway Cup wins with 30, while Munster has won the most hurling titles with 43. The longest hurling streak was Munster's six-in-a-row from 1948 to 1953, while Ulster won a football five-in-a-row from 1991 to 1995.

The Railway Cup has gone into severe decline in recent years. Some blame the GAA for this decline due to the low level of promotion given and the lack of a fixed date to be played each year. The finals, held on Saint Patrick's Day, attracted huge crowds in the 1950s and 1960s, however, by the 1990s attendances at the once prestigious competition had reduced to only a few hundred. The All-Ireland Club Finals have superseded them in popularity and have taken over the Saint Patrick's Day fixture in Croke Park.

== Hurling ==
Interprovincial Hurling Championship Railway Cup Hurling Championship
- Irish: An Corn Idir-Chúigeach; Corn an Iarnróid
- Code: Hurling
- Founded: 1927
- Abolished: 2017
- Region: Ireland (GAA)
- Trophy: Railway Cup
- No. of teams: 3-5
- Last Title holders: Munster (2016) (47th title)
- Most titles: Munster (47 titles)
- Sponsors: Martin Donnelly

The GAA Interprovincial Hurling Championship (known for sponsorship reasons as the M Donnelly Interpro and formerly referred to as the Railway Cup) was an annual inter-provincial hurling competition organised by the Gaelic Athletic Association and traditionally contested by the four historic provinces of Ireland, deciding the competition winners through a knockout format. Starting in 1927, it was contested until its abolition in 2017.

Connacht, Leinster and Munster were the first participating provinces, before being joined by Ulster in 1944 and the Combined Universities in 1972. The final, traditionally held at Croke Park on St. Patrick's Day, was the culmination of a series of knock-out games, with the winning team receiving the Railway Cup. At its peak it was one of the most prestigious competitions in Gaelic games, with players regarding it as a great honour to be included on their provincial team. Crowds of up to 50,000 regularly attended the final, however, interest waned since its heyday with only 562 attending the last final in 2016.

The title was won by three different teams, all of whom won the title more than once. The all-time record-holders are Munster, who won the championship on 47 occasions.

=== History ===
After the success of the inter-county All-Ireland Championship, which had been held since 1887, the Gaelic Athletic Association launched an inter-provincial competition in 1905. Sponsored by the Great Southern and Western Railway, the Railway Shield ran until 1908 when the competition ended after Leinster retained the title for a second successive year.

After a lapse of nearly 20 years, the idea of an inter-provincial tournament was resurrected. The Railway Cup, once again sponsored by the Great Southern Railways, was first held in 1927, with Ulster being the only province not to field a team. The very first match took place at Portlaoise on 21 November 1926, with Leinster beating Connacht by 7-06 to 3-05. Leinster went on to win the inaugural title after a 1-11 to 2-06 win over Munster in the final. The holding of the final at Croke Park on St. Patrick's Day (17 March) set a precedent that linked the competition to that date for many years to follow.

The 1944 Railway Cup was the first occasion when all four provinces took part, with Ulster fielding a team for the first time. They reached the 1945 final, after beating Leinster in the semi-final, but lost out to Munster. In late 1971 an application from the Universities' Council to enter a Combined Universities team was discussed by the Central Council of the Association. The proposal was readily accepted and the Combined Universities team was permitted to participate in the 1972 Railway Cup.

=== Sponsorship ===
Iarnród Éireann became the first title sponsor of the championship, serving in that capacity from 1991 until 1993. After a sponsor-less decade, businessman Martin Donnelly offered financial support in terms of sponsorship in 2002. He withdrew his sponsorship of the competition in 2014.

=== Venues ===
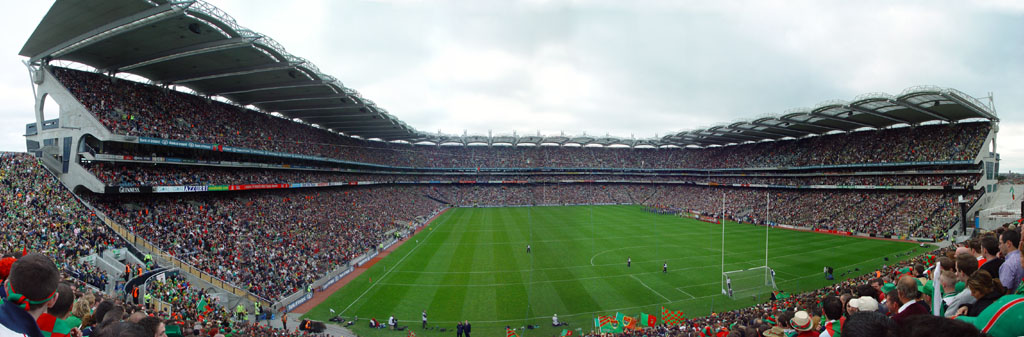
Croke Park in Dublin hosted every final between 1927 and 1977.

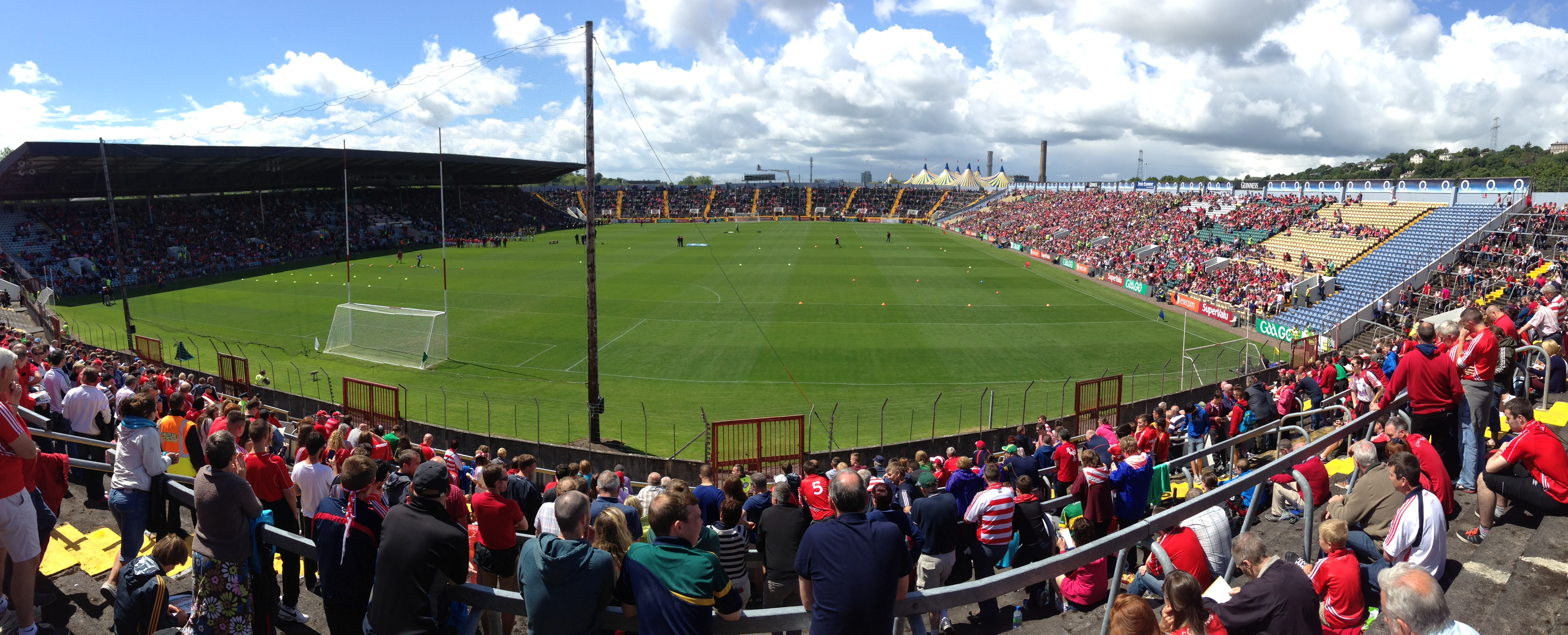
The newly-built Páirc Uí Chaoimh in Cork hosted the 1978 final.

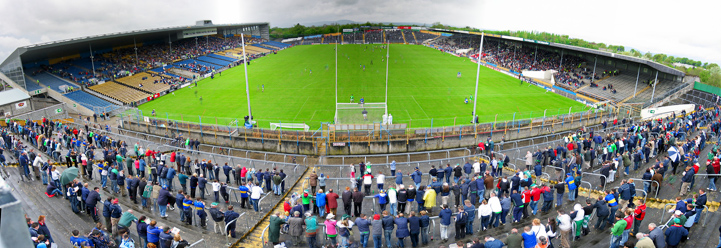
Semple Stadium in Thurles hosted five finals, including the last one in 2016.

==== Early rounds ====
Fixtures in the early rounds of the Railway Cup were usually played at a neutral venue that was deemed halfway between the participating teams. On occasions, Connacht and Ulster received home advantage, hosting semi-finals at Pearse Stadium, Duggan Park, Parkmore Sportsfield, Corrigan Park and Casement Park. The midlands regularly provided venues for Leinster-Connacht and Munster-Connacht matches, with O'Moore Park, O'Connor Park, St. Brendan's Park, St. Cronan's Park and MacDonagh Park being used.

==== Final ====
The final was played at Croke Park in Dublin every year from 1927 until 1977. A decline in popularity, coupled with the All-Ireland Club Championship taking the St. Patrick's Day slot at Croke Park, led to the Railway Cup final being moved around the country for the following 25 years. Páirc Uí Chaoimh, Semple Stadium, Cusack Park, Breffni Park, Nowlan Park and a number of smaller grounds all hosted the final at various stages

In 2003, the final was held in the Giulio Onesti Sports Complex in Rome. The success of that overseas trip led GAA chiefs to look into the possibility of making the staging of the final in Europe a regular date in the calendar. The final never returned to Europe, however, the 2005 final took place at the Irish Cultural Centre in Boston, while the 2009 final was held at Ghantoot Racing and Polo Club in Abu Dhabi.

The final returned to Croke Park for one final time in 2014, while Semple Stadium hosted the very last Railway Cup final in 2016.

=== Managers ===
Managers in the Railway Cup were involved in the day-to-day running of the team, including the training, team selection, and sourcing of players. The manager was usually assisted by a team of two or three selectors and a backroom team consisting of various coaches.

Winning managers
Manager	Team	Wins	Winning years
John Conran	Leinster	3	2006, 2008, 2009
Noel Skehan	Leinster	2	2002, 2003
Joe Dooley	Leinster	2	2012, 2014
Vincent Mullins	Connacht	1	2004
Joe O'Leary	Munster	1	2005
Michael Ryan	Munster	1	2007
Liam Sheedy	Munster	1	2013
Anthony Daly	Munster	1	2016

=== Roll of Honour ===
Province	Wins	Years won
Munster	47	1928, 1929, 1930, 1931, 1934, 1935, 1937, 1938, 1939, 1940, 1942, 1943, 1944, 1945, 1946, 1948, 1949, 1950, 1951, 1952, 1953, 1955, 1957, 1958, 1959, 1960, 1961, 1963, 1966, 1968, 1969, 1970, 1976, 1978, 1981, 1984, 1985, 1992, 1995, 1996, 1997, 2000, 2001, 2005, 2007, 2013, 2016
Leinster	28	1927, 1932, 1933, 1936, 1941, 1954, 1956, 1962, 1964, 1965, 1967, 1971, 1972, 1973, 1974, 1975, 1977, 1979, 1988, 1993, 1998, 2002, 2003, 2006, 2008, 2009, 2012, 2014
Connacht	11	1947, 1980, 1982, 1983, 1986, 1987, 1989, 1991, 1994, 1999, 2004
Ulster	0	Second place: 1945, 1992, 1993, 1995

=== Records and statistics ===
==== Final ====
===== Teams =====
- Most wins: 47:
  - Munster (1928, 1929, 1930, 1931, 1934, 1935, 1937, 1938, 1939, 1940, 1942, 1943, 1944, 1945, 1946, 1948, 1949, 1950, 1951, 1952, 1953, 1955, 1957, 1958, 1959, 1960, 1961, 1963, 1966, 1968, 1969, 1970, 1976, 1978, 1981, 1984, 1985, 1992, 1995, 1996, 1997, 2000, 2001, 2005, 2007, 2013, 2016)
- Most consecutive wins: 6:
  - Munster (1948, 1949, 1950, 1951, 1952, 1953)
- Most appearances in a final: 74:
  - Munster (1927, 1928, 1929, 1930, 1931, 1932, 1933, 1934, 1935, 1936, 1937, 1938, 1939, 1940, 1941, 1942, 1943, 1944, 1945, 1946, 1947, 1948, 1949, 1950, 1951, 1952, 1953, 1954, 1955, 1956, 1957, 1958, 1959, 1960, 1961, 1962, 1963, 1964, 1965, 1966, 1967, 1968, 1969, 1970, 1971, 1972, 1973, 1974, 1975, 1976, 1977, 1978, 1980, 1981, 1984, 1985, 1986, 1989, 1991, 1992, 1995, 1996, 1997, 1999, 2000, 2001, 2002, 2004, 2005, 2007, 2008, 2013, 2016)
- Most appearances in a final without ever winning: 4:
  - Ulster (1945, 1992, 1993, 1995)
- Most appearances in a final without losing (streak): 6
  - Munster (1948, 1949, 1950, 1951, 1952, 1953)
- Most consecutive defeats: 5:
  - Munster (1971, 1972, 1973, 1974, 1975)
- Most defeats: 37
  - Leinster (1928, 1929, 1930, 1931, 1934, 1935, 1937, 1938, 1939, 1940, 1942, 1943, 1948, 1950, 1951, 1953, 1957, 1958, 1960, 1961, 1963, 1966, 1968, 1970, 1976, 1978, 1981, 1982, 1983, 1984, 1987, 1994, 1996, 1997, 2000, 2005, 2016)

==== Individual ====
- Most wins by a player: 18, Christy Ring (Munster) (1942, 1943, 1944, 1945, 1946, 1948, 1949, 1950, 1951, 1952, 1953, 1955, 1957, 1958, 1959, 1960, 1961, 1963)

==== Team ====
===== By decade =====
The most successful team of each decade, judged by number of Railway Cup titles, is as follows:

- 1920s: 2 for Munster (1928–29)
- 1930s: 7 for Munster (1930-31-34-35-37-38-39)
- 1940s: 8 for Munster (1940-42-43-44-45-46-48-49)
- 1950s: 8 for Munster (1950-51-52-53-55-57-58-59)
- 1960s: 6 for Munster (1960-61-63-66-68-69)
- 1970s: 7 for Leinster (1971-72-73-74-75-77-79)
- 1980s: 6 for Connacht (1980-82-83-86-87-89)
- 1990s: 4 for Munster (1992-95-96-97)
- 2000s: 5 for Leinster (2002-03-06-08-09)
- 2010s: 2 each for Leinster (2012–14) and Munster (2013–16)

===== Gaps =====
Longest gaps between successive Railway Cup titles:

- 33 years: Connacht (1947–1980)
- 13 years: Leinster (1941–1954)
- 9 years: Leinster (1979–1988)

==== Top scorers ====
===== All time =====
Rank	Name	Team	Goals	Points	Total
1	Christy Ring	Munster	43	106	235
2	Eddie Keher	Leinster	19	124	181
3	Jimmy Doyle	Munster	15	72	117
4	Jimmy Smyth	Munster	15	28	73
5	Niall Healy	Connacht	1	65	68

===== By year =====
Year	Top scorer	Team	Score	Total
1994	Pat Potterton	Leinster	2-05	11
1995	Michael Cleary	Munster	0-17	17
1996	Gary Kirby	Munster	4-08	20
1997	Johnny Dooley	Leinster	0-18	18
1998	Charlie Carter	Leinster	1-09	12
1999	Tommy Dunne	Munster	1-10	13
2000	Joe Deane	Munster	1-11	14
2001	Alan Browne	Munster	2-13	19
2002	Eddie Brennan	Leinster	2-06	12
2002	Henry Shefflin	Leinster	0-12	12
2003	Henry Shefflin	Leinster	4-06	18
2003	Eugene Cloonan	Connacht	3-09	18
2004	Niall Healy	Connacht	0-12	12
2004	Eoin Kelly	Munster	0-12	12
2005	James Young	Leinster	0-19	19
2006	Eugene Cloonan	Connacht	2-15	21
2007	Eoin Kelly	Munster	1-20	23
2008	Eoin Kelly	Munster	1-12	15
2009	Niall Healy	Connacht	1-13	16
2010	No competition			
2011	No competition			
2012	Richie Power	Leinster	1-15	18
2013	Patrick Horgan	Munster	0-15	15
2014	Conor Cooney	Conancht	0-19	19
2015	No competition			
2016	Séamus Callanan	Munster	1-14	17

===== In a single game =====
Year	Top scorer	Team	Score	Total
2000	Charlie Carter	Leinster	1-07	10
2001	Alan Browne	Munster	1-08	11
2002	Joe Deane	Munster	2-02	8
2003	Henry Shefflin	Leinster	2-04	10
2004	Niall Healy	Connacht	0-11	11
2005	James Young	Leinster	0-12	12
2006	Eugene Cloonan	Connacht	2-06	12
2007	Eoin Kelly	Munster	1-10	13
2008	Richie Power	Leinster	0-09	9
2009	Niall Healy	Connacht	1-06	9
2009	Henry Shefflin	Leinster	1-06	9
2010	No competition			
2011	No competition			
2012	Richie Power	Leinster	0-10	10
2013	Neil McManus	Ulster	1-07	10
2014	Eoin Larkin	Leinster	0-12	12
2015	No competition			
2016	Séamus Callanan	Munster	1-07	10

===== In finals =====
Final	Top scorer	Team	Score	Total
1927	Matty Power	Leinster	1-02	5
1928	John Joe Callanan	Munster	2-00	6
1929	Connie Keane	Munster	3-01	10
1930	Tommy Treacy	Munster	3-00	9
1931	Matty Power	Leinster	2-01	7
1932	Martin Kennedy	Munster	3-01	10
1933	Martin Kennedy	Munster	3-01	10
1934	Mick Mackey	Munster	3-00	9
1935	Seán Harrington	Munster	1-00	3
1935	Mick Hennessy	Munster	1-00	3
1935	Martin Kennedy	Munster	1-00	3
1935	Johnny Dunne	Leinster	1-00	3
1935	Locky Byrne	Leinster	1-00	3
1935	Matty Power	Leinster	1-00	3
1936	Johnny Dunne	Leinster	1-02	5
1937	Mick Mackey	Munster	0-04	4
1938	Johnny Quirke	Munster	3-00	9
1939	Mick Flynn	Leinster	1-00	3
1939	Mick Mackey	Munster	1-00	3
1939	John Mackey	Munster	1-00	3
1939	Locky Byrne	Munster	1-00	3
1939	Jim Mullane	Munster	1-00	3
1939	Paddy Phelan	Leinster	0-03	3
1939	Ned Wade	Munster	0-03	3
1940	Jimmy Phelan	Leinster	3-01	10
1941	Jim Langton	Leinster	1-02	5
1942	Mossy McDonnell	Leinster	3-01	10
1943	Jim Langton	Leinster	2-04	10
1944	John Mackey	Munster	2-00	6
1944	M. Nestor	Connacht	2-00	6
1945	Johnny Quirke	Munster	2-02	8
1946	Christy Ring	Munster	1-07	10
1947	Hubert Gordon	Connacht	1-00	3
1947	Tadhg Kelly	Connacht	1-00	3
1947	Jerry O'Riordan	Munster	1-00	3
1947	Josie Gallagher	Connacht	0-03	3
1948	Vin Baston	Munster	2-00	6
1949	Christy Ring	Munster	2-03	9
1950	Christy Ring	Munster	0-04	4
1951	Christy Ring	Munster	1-04	7
1952	Christy Ring	Munster	3-03	12
1953	Séamus Bannon	Munster	2-00	6
1953	Nicky Rackard	Leinster	2-00	6
1953	Ned Wheeler	Leinster	2-00	6
1953	Pat Stakelum	Munster	1-03	6
1954	Christy Ring	Munster	0-03	3
1954	Jim Langton	Leinster	0-03	3
1955	Christy Ring	Munster	2-04	10
1956	Nicky Rackard	Leinster	2-06	12
1957	Christy Ring	Munster	3-05	14
1958	Mick Kenny	Leinster	1-04	7
1959	Christy Ring	Munster	4-05	17
1960	Jimmy Doyle	Munster	2-00	6
1960	Paddy Barry	Munster	2-00	6
1960	Jimmy Smyth	Munster	2-00	6
1960	Padge Kehoe	Leinster	0-06	6
1961	Jimmy Doyle	Munster	2-06	12
1962	Liam Devaney	Munster	0-05	5
1963	Denis Heaslip	Leinster	3-00	9
1963	Jimmy Doyle	Munster	2-03	9
1964	Eddie Keher	Leinster	2-05	11
1965	Mick Bermingham	Leinster	2-02	8
1966	Frankie Walsh	Munster	2-07	13
1967	Eddie Keher	Leinster	2-06	12
1968	Mick Roche	Munster	0-04	4
1969	Paddy Fahy	Connacht	3-01	10
1969	Jimmy Doyle	Munster	1-07	10
1970	Eddie Keher	Leinster	0-07	7
1971	Eddie Keher	Leinster	0-09	9
1972	Eddie Keher	Leinster	1-06	9
1973	Eddie Keher	Leinster	0-07	7
1974	Eddie Keher	Leinster	1-07	10
1975	Eddie Keher	Leinster	0-07	7
1976	Eddie Keher	Leinster	2-02	8
1977	Tony Doran	Leinster	1-03	6
1977	Eddie Keher	Leinster	0-06	6
1978	Ned Buggy	Leinster	0-08	8
1979	John Connolly	Connacht	1-04	7
1980	Seán Silke	Connacht	1-00	3
1981	Éamonn Cregan	Munster	1-06	9
1982	P. J. Molloy	Connacht	2-02	8
1983	Martin Cuddy	Leinster	1-00	3
1984	John Fenton	Munster	0-05	5
1985	Nicky English	Munster	2-00	6
1986	Noel Lane	Connacht	2-01	7
1987	Ger Fennelly	Leinster	0-05	5
1988	Michael Connolly	Connacht	0-07	7
1988	Mark Corrigan	Leinster	0-07	7
1989	Éanna Ryan	Connacht	2-02	8
1990	No competition			
1991	Michael McGrath	Connacht	1-04	7
1991	Michael Cleary	Munster	0-07	7
1992	Séamus Downey	Ulster	1-02	5
1992	Michael Cleary	Munster	1-02	5
1993	Eamon Morrissey	Leinster	1-04	7
1994	Tom Dempsey	Leinster	0-05	5
1994	Liam Burke	Connacht	0-05	5
1995	Michael Cleary	Munster	0-08	8
1996	Gary Kirby	Munster	1-04	7
1997	Johnny Dooley	Leinster	0-10	10
1998	David Cuddy	Leinster	0-05	5
1999	Tommy Dunne	Munster	1-05	8
2000	Charlie Carter	Leinster	1-07	10
2001	Alan Browne	Munster	1-08	11
2002	Eoin McGrath	Munster	2-01	7
2002	Henry Shefflin	Leinster	0-07	7
2002	Tommy Dunne	Munster	0-07	7
2003	Eugene Cloonan	Connacht	2-03	9
2004	Eoin Kelly	Munster	0-12	12
2005	Ben O'Connor	Munster	0-07	7
2005	James Young	Leinster	0-07	7
2006	Eugene Cloonan	Connacht	0-09	9
2007	Niall Healy	Connacht	0-11	11
2008	Richie Power	Leinster	0-09	9
2009	Henry Shefflin	Leinster	1-06	9
2010	No competition			
2011	No competition			
2012	Richie Power	Leinster	0-10	10
2013	Patrick Horgan	Munster	0-09	9
2014	Eoin Larkin	Leinster	0-12	12
2015	No competition			
2016	T. J. Reid	Leinster	1-06	9

== Football ==
=== Managers ===
Managers in the Railway Cup were involved in the day-to-day running of the team, including the training, team selection, and sourcing of players. The manager was usually assisted by a team of two or three selectors and a backroom team consisting of various coaches.

Winning managers
Manager	Team	Wins	Winning years
Brian McEniff	Ulster	13	1983, 1984, 1989, 1991, 1992, 1993, 1994, 1995, 1998, 2000, 2003, 2004, 2007
Joe Kernan	Ulster	3	2009, 2012, 2013
Luke Dempsey	Leinster	2	2001, 2002
Val Andrews	Leinster	2	2005, 2006
Ger O'Sullivan	Munster	1	2008
John Tobin	Connacht	1	2014
Pete McGrath	Ulster	1	2016

=== Roll of Honour ===
Province	Wins	Years Won
Ulster	33	1942, 1943, 1947, 1950, 1956, 1960, 1963, 1964, 1965, 1966, 1968, 1970, 1971, 1979, 1980, 1983, 1984, 1989, 1991, 1992, 1993, 1994, 1995, 1998, 2000, 2003, 2004, 2007, 2009, 2012, 2013, 2016, 2024
Leinster	28	1928, 1929, 1930, 1932, 1933, 1935, 1939, 1940, 1944, 1945, 1952, 1953, 1954, 1955, 1959, 1961, 1962, 1974, 1985, 1986, 1987, 1988, 1996, 1997, 2001, 2002, 2005, 2006
Munster	15	1927, 1931, 1941, 1946, 1948, 1949, 1972, 1975, 1976, 1977, 1978, 1981, 1982, 1999, 2008
Connacht	10	1934, 1936, 1937, 1938, 1951, 1957, 1958, 1967, 1969, 2014
Combined Universities	1	1973

=== Records and statistics ===
==== Final ====
===== Teams =====
- Most wins: 33:
  - Ulster (1942, 1943, 1947, 1950, 1956, 1960, 1963, 1964, 1965, 1966, 1968, 1970, 1971, 1979, 1980, 1983, 1984, 1989, 1991, 1992, 1993, 1994, 1995, 1998, 2000, 2003, 2004, 2007, 2009, 2012, 2013, 2016, 2024)
- Most consecutive wins: 5:
  - Ulster (1991, 1992, 1993, 1994, 1995)

==== Individual ====
- Most wins by a player: 8, Seán O'Neill (Ulster) 1960, 1963, 1964, 1965, 1966, 1968, 1970, 1971

==== Team ====
===== By decade =====
The most successful team of each decade, judged by number of Railway Cup titles, is as follows:

- 1920s: 2 for Leinster (1928–29)
- 1930s: 5 for Leinster ( 1930-32-33-35-39)
- 1940s: 4 for Munster (1941-46-48-49)
- 1950s: 5 for Leinster (1952-53-54-55-59)
- 1960s: 6 for Ulster (1960-63-64-65-66-68)
- 1970s: 5 for Munster (1972-75-76-77-78)
- 1980s: 4 each for Ulster (1980-83-84-89) and Leinster (1985-86-87-88)
- 1990s: 6 for Ulster (1991-92-93-94-95-98)
- 2000s: 5 for Ulster (2000-03-04-07-09)
- 2010s: 3 for Ulster (2012-13-16)

===== Gaps =====
Longest gaps between successive Railway Cup titles:

- 45 years: Connacht (1969–2014)
- 23 years: Munster (1949–1972)
- 17 years: Munster (1982–1999)
- 13 years: Connacht (1938–1951)
- 12 years: Leinster (1962–1974)

== History ==
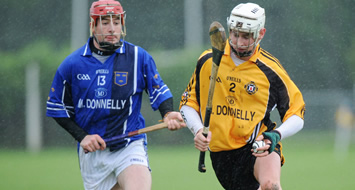
Munster's Andrew O'Shaughnessy (left) chasing Ulster's Arron Graffin in the 2008 Railway Cup hurling semi-final

Up to and including 1986, the Inter-pros were played in the Spring, with the semi-finals usually in February and the finals on Saint Patrick's Day. From 1987 to 1989 then were given an Autumn slot, moving back to the Spring in 1991 (there was no competition in 1990). 1993 saw the competition played again in the Autumn, but all others from 1991 until 2000 were played in the early part of the year, with the semi-finals even being played in January in 1997, 1998 and 2000. However the rescheduling of the commencement of the National Football and National Hurling Leagues to the start of the calendar year, has seen the Railway Cup moved to the latter part of the year from 2001 onwards. In an effort to combat the declining popularity of the competition, some including Ulster manager Joe Kernan have suggested playing the finals as double-headers with the respective All-Ireland Club Football and All-Ireland Club Hurling Championship finals in the early part of the year in Croke Park and Semple Stadium respectively. The 2009 hurling semi-finals were held in February, and the final took place in March in Abu Dhabi in the United Arab Emirates. Abu Dhabi joined a list of foreign cities including Boston, Paris and Rome to have hosted finals. Plans to stage the 2014 Inter-Provincial finals in Texas fell through.

Attendances at the matches have fallen. However players seem to love playing in the competition. Former Armagh player Martin McQuillan said it gave players not accustomed to success at county level, a chance to taste victory.

On 23 February 2014, Connacht defeated Ulster by 2-19 to 1-7 at Tuam Stadium to win the Inter-provincial football championship for the first time since 1969.

=== Combined Universities ===
In 1971 the Universities Council of the GAA (Comhairle na nOllscoil) applied to the Central Council of the GAA for permission to compete in the Railway Cup football and hurling series. The request had been studied by the Executive of the Central Council. The Universities Council estimated that there were about 70 inter-county players in the Sigerson and Fitzgibbon competitions studying at U.C.D, U.C.G., U.C.C., Q.U.B., T.C.D., U.U. Coleraine and St Patrick's Maynooth. At the Central Council meeting held on 23 October 1971, the proposal of Comhairle na nOllscoil was approved unanimously. While the idea was looked upon positively by some elements of the Press as a way of injecting life back into this inter-provincial tournament, other feared that the public would tire of this innovation as they had in the case of the Combined Universities v (Rest of) Ireland tests long before they lingered to an unlamented death and doubted whether the Combined Universities would revive the Railway Cup. Pat McDonnell of UCC and Cork full-back, Texaco Hurler of the Year in 1969, had the honour of captaining the first Combined Universities team to compete in the Railway Cup against Ulster at Croke Park. The University hurlers defeated Ulster in the preliminary round, but were narrowly beaten by Leinster in the semi-final, while the University footballers did not survive the preliminary round of the football Railway Cup.

In 1973 the Combined Universities footballers beat Connacht to win the Railway Cup in a final replay at Athlone. This is the only occasion in the history of the Railway Cup that it was not won by a provincial team. The hurlers again beat Ulster but were again beaten by Leinster in the semi-final. In 1974 both the University hurlers and footballers reached the semi-finals, losing to Munster and Leinster, respectively.

The Railway Cup experiment was meeting criticism from within the Universities sector because it was interfering with University League fixtures. In May 1974 Comhairle na nOllscoil decided to opt out of the Railway Cup competition.

=== Demise and return ===
The fixtures for the 2017 competition were indefinitely postponed after Connacht pulled out, citing fixture demands on players and lack of spectator interest. The Irish Times reported that the other three provinces had "indicated that they believe the end has come for the 90-year-old competition" and no dates were scheduled for the competition in 2018 and beyond. The competition returned in 2024 after an eight-year hiatus.

== See also ==
- Interprovincial Hurling Championship
- Interprovincial Football Championship
