= Josie Gallagher =

Irish hurler

Personal information
- Native name: Seosamh Ó Gallchóir (Irish)
- Born: Gort, County Galway
- Height: 5 ft 7 in (170 cm)

Sport
- Sport: Hurling
- Position: Forward
Club
- Years: Club
- Gort
Inter-county
- Years: County
- 1942-1954: Galway
Inter-county titles
- Connacht titles: 0
- All-Irelands: 0
- NHL: 1

Josie Gallagher (1923 – September 1998) was an Irish sportsperson. He played hurling with his local club Gort and with the Galway senior inter-county team from 1942 until 1954.

== Playing career ==
=== Club ===
Gallagher played his club hurling with his local club in Gort, however, he enjoyed little success. His playing days coincided with a downturn in the club's fortunes.

=== Inter-county ===
Gallagher first came to prominence with the Galway senior inter-county team in the 1940s. Galway hurling was in the doldrums at the time. The fact that the county faced no competition in Connacht meant that Galway went straight into the All-Ireland series every single year. This was not a happy hunting ground for the county.

Gallagher first tasted success with Galway in 1951. That year his side reached the finals of the National Hurling League. Galway defeated Wexford and New York giving Gallagher a league title.

Two years later in 1953 Galway defeated a star-studded Kilkenny team in the penultimate stage of the championship. This victory allowed Gallagher's side to advance to the All-Ireland final where Cork provided the opposition. The game itself is remembered as one of the ugliest championship deciders ever and is clouded in controversy due to the injury to the Galway captain, Mick Burke. Galway lost the game by 3-3 to 0-8. After the match at the Gresham Hotel in Dublin a fight broke out when another Galway player struck Cork's Christy Ring. The following morning another fight broke out when another member of the Galway panel attempted to hit Ring. The fights, however, ended just as quickly as they had started.

Gallagher's inter-county hurling career ended in 1954.

=== Provincial ===
Gallagher also lined out with Connacht in the inter-provincial hurling competition. He won his sole Railway Cup medal in 1947 as his side defeated Munster.
