= Centenary of the Gaelic Athletic Association =

Centenary celebrations of foundation of the Gaelic Athletic Association

Centenary of the GAA
- Date: 1984
- Location: Ireland
- Organised by: Gaelic Athletic Association

The centenary of the Gaelic Athletic Association celebrated 100 years since the foundation of the Gaelic Athletic Association (GAA) with a series of events, commemorative releases, merchandise and competitions throughout 1984.

== Background ==
The GAA was established in Hayes Hotel in Thurles, County Tipperary on 1 November 1884 to foster and preserve Ireland's unique games and athletic pastimes. In an address to the Association, Taoiseach Garret Fitzgerald stated "During this hundred years, the association has made a profound contribution to Ireland. In a unique way, it has created a sense of community among Irish people both at home and abroad".

Plans to celebrate the centenary began in 1978, with redevelopment of Semple Stadium estimated at £500,000.

== Commemorative productions and events ==
=== Booklet ===
A special booklet, published by the GAA entitled "A Centenary of Service" was launched by GAA President Paddy Buggy, containing messages of congratulations from civic and religious leaders and other personalities.

=== Medal ===
A special commemorative medal was designed by Dublin jeweller Thomas Gear, whose previous work included similar items for the 1979 Papal visit to Ireland of Pope John Paul II and the Joyce centenary. It featured on one side a hurling player about to strike a sliotar surrounded by the text Cumann Lúthchleas Gael – GAA – Comórad Céad Bliain. On the obverse, it features a relief of Hayes Hotel, Thurles. The medals were produced in limited quantities in 20 carat gold, Irish silver and bronze. The silver was made specially available by the Bank of Ireland, smelted from silver ore from the Tynagh Mines in County Galway.

=== Centennial Salute ===
The 'Centennial Salute' is a piece of music written specifically for the centenary by Joe Lynch, then musical director of the Artane Boys Band.

=== Exhibition ===
A special exhibition was held at the RDS Dublin between 16 and 20 May 1984 which featured historical artifacts from across Ireland. The exhibition was officially opened by Minister for Public Service John Boland.

=== Late Late Show special ===
A special edition of the Late Late Show, Ireland's most popular talk show, was broadcast on 22 September 1984 and hosted by Gay Byrne featured GAA personalities Paddy Buggy, Liam Mulvihill, Liz Howard and former Taoiseach and six-time All-Ireland winner Jack Lynch.

=== Wexford play ===
The Wexford Centenary committee commissioned writer Nicky Furlong to write a play-pageant to outline the Association's activity in the county. It was directed by Tomás Mac Anna, director and producer of Dublin's Abbey Theatre.

== Centenary cups ==
Two inter-county competitions, one each in football and hurling were organised. This competition differed from the traditional All-Ireland Championships in that it was an open draw across all the participating counties, rather than following the provincial championship format.

The football competition began on 8 April, the hurling competition on 15 April, with both finals played in Croke Park on 20 May.

=== Football final ===
20 May 1984
Final

Meath	0–10 – 0–8	Monaghan
P Lyons 0–1, M McCabe 0–3, L Smith 0–4, C O'Rourke 0–2		H Clerkin 0–1, K Finlay 0–3, E Hughes 0–4

Croke Park, Dublin
Referee: Seamus Aldridge (Kildare)

=== Hurling final ===
20 May 1984
Final

Cork	2–21 – 1–09	Laois
T Mulcahy 1–2, J Fenton 0–5, K Hennessy 1–1, J Barry-Murphy 0–4, S O'Leary 0–3, D Walsh 0–3, J Hartnett 0–1, P Horgan 0–1, D MacCurtain 0–1.		B Bohane 0–4, PJ Cuddy 1–0, P Critchley 0–1, M Cuddy 0–1, M Brophy 0–1, E Fennelly 0–1, C Jones 0–1.

Croke Park
Referee: N O'Donoghue (Dublin)

== All-Ireland Championships ==
That year's All-Ireland Hurling Final was played at Semple Stadium in Thurles on 2 September, the first time the final had been played outside Croke Park since 1937. The final was contested between Cork and Offaly, which Cork won by 3–16 to 1–12.

=== 1984 All Ireland Senior Hurling Championship final ===
2 September 1984
15:30 BST

Cork	3–16 – 1–12	Offaly
S. O'Leary (2–1); J.Fenton (0–7)(4f); T. O'Sullivan (0–6); K. Hennessy (1–0); T. Mulcahy (0–1); P. Hartnett (0–1)		M. Corrigan (1–2); P. Carroll (0–4); P. Delaney (0–4)(1f, 3 65's); P. Horan (0–2)(1f)

Semple Stadium, Thurles
Attendance: 59,814
Referee: Paschal Long (Kilkenny)

The football final was contested between Kerry and Dublin on 23 September. Kerry won the game 0–14 to 1–6.

=== 1984 All Ireland Senior Football Championship final ===
23 September 1984
Final

Kerry	0–14 – 1–6	Dublin
J Kennedy 0–5, P Spillane 0–4, E Liston 0–3, J O'Shea 0–1, D Moran 0–1.		B Rock 1–5, T Conroy 0–1.

Croke Park, Dublin
Attendance: 68,365
Referee: Paddy Collins (Westmeath)

== International Rules series ==
Gaelic football had long been compared to Australian Rules Football. Touring Australian teams had undertaken tours of Ireland in 1967 and 1969, playing an early form of International Rules. Ireland played Australia in the first official International rules football series with three games played between 21 October and 4 November in Cork and Dublin.

The Australian team won the test series 2–1 and finished with a superior aggregate of 222 points to Ireland's 208.

== Teams of the century ==
Four teams of the century were selected, one in football and one in hurling, and another set covering both codes involving players who had never won an All-Ireland Championship.

The players on the teams were nominated by Sunday Independent readers and were selected by a panel of experts and former players.

GAA Teams of the Century
Position	Football (All Ireland Winners)	Hurling (All Ireland Winners)	Football (non-All Ireland Winners)	Hurling (non-All Ireland Winners)
Goalkeeper	Dan O'Keefe	Tony Reddin	Aidan Bradey	Seánie Duggan
Full Back	Enda Colleran	Bobby Rackard	Willie Casey	Jim Fives
Full Back	Paddy O'Brien	Nick O'Donnell	Eddie Boyle	Noel Drumgoole
Full Back	Seán Flanagan	John Doyle	John McKnight	John Joe 'Goggles' Doyle
Half Back	Seán Murphy	Jimmy Finn	Gerry O'Reilly	Seán Herbert
Half Back	John Joe O'Reilly	John Keane	Gerry O'Malley	Seán Stack
Half Back	Stephen White	Paddy Phelan	Seán Quinn	Colm Doran
Midfield	Mick O'Connell	Lory Meagher	Jim McKeever	Joe Salmon
Midfield	Jack O'Shea	Jack Lynch	Tommy Murphy	John 'Jobber' McGrath
Half Forward	Seán O'Neill	Christy Ring	Sean O'Connell	Josie Gallagher
Half Forward	Seán Purcell	Mick Mackey	Packy McGarty	Martin Quigley
Half Forward	Pat Spillane	Jim Langton	Michael Kearins	Kevin Armstrong
Full Forward	Mikey Sheehy	Jimmy Doyle	Charlie Gallagher	Jimmy Smith
Full Forward	Tommy Langan	Nicky Rackard	Willie McGee	Christy O'Brien
Full Forward	Kevin Heffernan	Eddie Keher	Dinny Allen	Mick Bermingham
