= 1949 All-Ireland Senior Hurling Championship final =

1949 All-Ireland Senior Hurling Final
- Event: 1949 All-Ireland Senior Hurling Championship
Tipperary	Laois
3-11	0-3
- Date: 4 September 1949
- Venue: Croke Park, Dublin
- Referee: M. J. 'Inky' Flaherty (Galway)
- Attendance: 67,168

The 1949 All-Ireland Senior Hurling Championship Final was the 62nd All-Ireland Final and the culmination of the 1949 All-Ireland Senior Hurling Championship, an inter-county hurling tournament for the top teams in Ireland. The match was held at Croke Park, Dublin, on 4 September 1949, between Tipperary and Laois. The Leinster champions lost to their Munster opponents on a score line of 3-11 to 0-3.

Laois trailed 1-5 to 0-3 at half time but failed to score again in the second half.

== Match details ==
4 September 1949
15:15 UTC+1

Tipperary	3-11 – 0-3	Laois
Kennedy 2‑4; S. Kenny 1‑3; Stakelum, T. Ryan, Shanahan, P. Kenny 0‑1 each		Styles 0‑2; Dargan 0‑1

Croke Park, Dublin
Attendance: 67,168
Referee: M. J. Flaherty (Galway)

Tipperary	Laois

1	Tony Reddin	Lorrha
2	Mickey Byrne	Thurles Sarsfields
3	Tony Brennan	Clonoulty
4	John Doyle	Holycross
5	Pat Stakelum	Holycross	captain
6	Flor Coffey	Boherlahan
7	Tommy Doyle	Thurles Sarsfields
8	Seán Kenny	Borrisoleigh
9	Phil Shanahan	Toomevara
10	Tommy Ryan	Thurles Sarsfields
11	Mick Ryan	Dicksboro
12	Jimmy Kennedy	UCD
13	Jack Ryan	Roscrea
14	Sonny Maher	Boherlahan
15	Séamus Bannon	St. Mary's Nenagh
Substitutes:
	Paddy Kenny	Borrisoleigh	for Coffey [between 10th and 20 minute]
	Pat Furlong	Knockavilla	unused
	Jim Devitt	Cashel King Cormacs	unused
	Ned Gorman	Holycross	unused
	Bob Stakelum	Holycross	unused
	Jimmy Maher	Boherlahan	unused

1	Timmy Fitzpatrick	Kilcotton
2	Liam White	Borris-in-Ossory
3	Jackie Bergin	Abbeyleix
4	Paddy McCormack	Rathdowney
5	Jimmy Murray	Errill
6	Tom Byrne	Rovers
7	Paddy Ruschitzko	Clonad	captain
8	Billy Bohane	Clonad
9	Joe Styles	Clonad
10	Paddy Hogan	Rathdowney
11	Harry Gray	Faughs
12	Paddy O'Brien	Faughs
13	Paddy Lalor	Abbeyleix
14	Dinny Ford	Clonaslee
15	Paddy Kelly	Abbeyleix
Substitutes:
	Billy Dargan	Clonad	for O'Brien [within the first 5 minutes]
	Andy Dunne	Clonad	for Ruschitzko
	Jack Donovan	Clonad	unused
	Dinny Cooke	Rovers	unused
	Peter Fitzpatrick	Kilcotton	unused
	Arty Ring	Abbeyleix	unused
