= Hurling Team of the Millennium =

Fantasy hurling team

The An Post GAA Hurling Team of the Millennium was chosen in 2000 to comprise, as a fifteen-member side divided as one goalkeeper, three full-backs, three half-backs, two midfielders, three half-forwards and three full-forwards, the best hurling team of all-time.

The team, announced by GAA President Seán McCague on 24 July 2000 at a special function in Croke Park, was selected by a special committee, comprising five past GAA presidents - Joe McDonagh, Con Murphy, Paddy Buggy, Pat Fanning and Séamus Ó Riain - as well as GAA director-general Liam Mulvihill and four Gaelic games journalists: Paddy Downey, Mick Dunne, Seán Óg Ó Ceallacháin and Jim O'Sullivan.

The initiative was sponsored by An Post, who issued special commemorative stamps of the millennium team members.

Position	Player	County team	Club team(s)	Team number	All-Ireland SHC, NHL, All-Stars and other awards
Goalkeeper	Tony Reddin	Tipperary (1947–1957)	Mullagh; Lorrha	1	All-Ireland SHC (1949, 1950, 1951); Munster SHC (1949, 1950, 1951); National Hurling League (1949, 1950, 1952, 1954)
Right corner-back	John Doyle	Tipperary (1949–1967)	Holycross-Ballycahill	2	All-Ireland SHC (1949, 1950, 1951, 1958, 1961, 1962, 1964, 1965); Munster SHC (1949, 1950, 1951, 1958, 1960, 1961, 1962, 1964, 1965, 1967); National Hurling League (1950, 1952, 1954, 1955, 1957, 1959, 1960, 1961, 1964, 1965)
Full-back	Nick O'Donnell	Wexford (1951–1962)	St Aidan's	3	All-Ireland SHC (1955, 1956, 1960)
Left corner-back	Bobby Rackard	Wexford (1945–1957)	Rathnure	4	All-Ireland SHC (1955, 1956); Leinster SHC (1951, 1954, 1955, 1956); National Hurling League (1956)
Right wing-back	Paddy Phelan	Kilkenny (1931–1940)	Tullaroan	5	All-Ireland SHC (1932, 1933, 1935, 1939); Leinster SHC (1931, 1932, 1933, 1935, 1936, 1937, 1939, 1940); National Hurling League (1933)
Centre-back	John Keane	Waterford (1935–1951)	Mount Sion	6	All-Ireland SHC (1948); Munster SHC (1938,1948)
Left wing-back	Brian Whelahan	Offaly (1989–2006)	Birr	7	All-Ireland SHC (1994, 1998); Leinster SHC (1989, 1990, 1994, 1995); National Hurling League (1991); Texaco Hurler of the Year (1994, 1998); All-Star Awards (1992, 1995, 1998, 1999)
Midfield	Jack Lynch	Cork (1936–1950)	Glen Rovers	8	All-Ireland SHC (1941, 1942, 1943, 1944, 1946); Munster SHC (1939, 1942, 1943, 1944, 1946, 1947); National Hurling League (1940, 1941, 1948); GAA All-Time All Star Award (1981)
Midfield	Lory Meagher	Kilkenny (1924–1936)	Tullaroan	9	All-Ireland SHC (1932, 1933, 1935); Leinster SHC (1925, 1926, 1931, 1932, 1933, 1935); National Hurling League (1933)
Right wing-forward	Christy Ring	Cork (1940–1962)	Glen Rovers	10	All-Ireland SHC (1941, 1942, 1943, 1944, 1946, 1952, 1953, 1954); Munster SHC (1942, 1943, 1944, 1946, 1947, 1952, 1953, 1954, 1956); National Hurling League (1940, 1941, 1953)
Centre-forward	Mick Mackey	Limerick (1930–1946)	Ahane	11	All-Ireland SHC (1934, 1936, 1940); Munster SHC (1933, 1934, 1935, 1936, 1940); National Hurling League (1934, 1935, 1936, 1937, 1938); GAA All-Time All Star Award (1980)
Left wing-forward	Jim Langton	Kilkenny (1938–1950)	Éire Óg GAA (Kilkenny)	12	All-Ireland SHC (1939, 1947); Leinster SHC (1939, 1940, 1943, 1945, 1946, 1947, 1950); GAA All-Time All Star Award (1984)
Left corner-forward	Eddie Keher	Kilkenny (1959–1977)	Rower-Inistioge	13	All-Ireland SHC (1963, 1967, 1969, 1972, 1974, 1975); Leinster SHC (1963, 1964, 1966, 1967, 1969, 1971, 1972, 1973, 1974, 1975); National Hurling League (1962, 1976); Texaco Hurler of the Year (1972); Cú Chulainn Awards (1963, 1966, 1967, 1969); All-Star Awards (1971, 1972, 1973, 1974, 1975)
Full-forward	Ray Cummins	Cork (1969–1982)	Blackrock	14	All-Ireland SHC (1970, 1976, 1977, 1978); Munster SHC (1969, 1970, 1972, 1975, 1976, 1977, 1978, 1979, 1982); National Hurling League (1970, 1972, 1980); All-Ireland Club SHC (1974, 1979); Munster Club SHC (1973, 1975, 1978, 1979); All-Star Hurling Awards (1971, 1972, 1977); All-Ireland SFC (1973); Munster SFC (1971, 1973, 1974); All-Star Football Awards (1971, 1973)
Right corner-forward	Jimmy Doyle	Tipperary (1957–1973)	Thurles Sarsfields	15	All-Ireland SHC (1958, 1961, 1962, 1964, 1965, 1971); Munster SHC (1958, 1960, 1961, 1962, 1964, 1965, 1967, 1968, 1971); National Hurling League (1957, 1959, 1960, 1961, 1964, 1965)

== Controversy ==
While universal agreement on such a team would prove impossible, the selection committee came in for some criticism regarding omissions and changes from the earlier GAA Hurling Team of the Century.

Kilkenny's D. J. Carey was seen as a shock omission from the team. As the holder of a then record seven All-Stars, Carey, whose inter-county career began in 1989, was seen as one of the greatest goal-scorers of his era and was hotly tipped to get one of the half-forward spots for which he was nominated.

The 1990s were regarded as a golden age of hurling with many new teams emerging, however, this was not reflected in the team. Clare's Brian Lohan had been tipped for full-back but Wexford's Nick O'Donnell held on. There were no places for any of the Clare team that emerged to win two championships in the nineties. Brian Whelehan was the only player from the previous 20 years to make the team.

An absence of players from Galway also sparked off major controversy in that county where the selection committee were accused of belittling the county by not recognising any of its heroes.

There was anger too in Wexford over the dropping of full-forward Nicky Rackard from the Team of the Century. Former midfielder Dave Bernie, who won an All-Ireland medal in 1968, when Rackard was a selector, said Wexford fans were stunned by the news he had not been included.
