= Andy Fleming (Irish sportsman) =

Irish hurler and Gaelic footballer

Personal information
- Native name: Aindrias Pléimeann (Irish)
- Born: 16 April 1916 Belmont, County Offaly, Ireland
- Died: 27 March 2011 (aged 94) Ferrybank, County Waterford, Ireland
- Occupation: CIÉ employee

Sport
- Sport: Hurling
- Position: Right corner-back
Clubs
- Years: Club
- Mount Sion; Stradbally
Club titles
	Football	Hurling
Waterford titles	5	6
Inter-county
- Years: County
- 1939-1951: Waterford
Inter-county titles
- Munster titles: 1
- All-Irelands: 1

Andrew Thomas Fleming (16 April 1916 – 27 March 2011) was an Irish hurler and Gaelic footballer. At club level he played with Mount Sion and Stradbally, and was part of the Waterford senior hurling team that won the All-Ireland SHC title in 1948.

== Early life ==
Fleming was born in Belmont, County Offaly, where his father worked for the Great Southern Railway. The family later settled in Durrow, County Waterford, where his father became station master. Fleming attended the local national school, before receiving his secondary education at Mount Sion CBS.

== Club career ==
Fleming grew up in an area when Gaelic football was the dominant game and he played with the Stradbally club. Having played hurling as student at Mount Sion CBS, he was invited to play with Kilmacthomas in a junior game in 1938. Fleming transferred to the Mount Sion club the following year and won his first Waterford SHC medal, following a 2–04 to 2–02 win over Erin's Own. He also won a Waterford JFC title that year.

Fleming continued to hurl for Moun Sion after transferring back to Stradbally for football. He won five Waterford SFC title in succession between 1940 and 1944. He also claimed a second Waterford SHC medal in 1940, after Mount Sion's two–point defeat of Dungarvan. Fleming won six Waterford SHC medals in total, with further victories in 1943, 1945, 1948 and 1949.

== Inter-county career ==
Fleming's performance for Kilmacthomas in a junior game in August 1938 resulted in calls for him to be immediately added to the Waterford senior team that had qualified for the 1938 All-Ireland final. The call-up never came, however, he was added to the senior team in 1939. Fleming lined out in Waterford's 2–13 to 3–08 defeat by Cork in the 1943 Munster final.

Five years later, Fleming was at right corner-back when Waterford won their first Munster SHC title in a decade, following a one–point win over Cork in the final. He was again at right corner-back on the first Waterford team to win the All-Ireland SHC, when Dublin were beaten by 6–07 to 4–02 in the 1948 All-Ireland final.

== Inter-provincial career ==
Fleming played in eight Railway Cup campaigns with Munster between 1943 and 1951. Lining out at wing-back, he won four successive Railway Cup medals between 1943 and 1946. Munster were beaten by Connacht in 1947, with Fleming being left out of the team in 1948. Waterford's All-Ireland SHC success and his part in it resulted in Fleming being recalled to the Munster team. He won a further three successive Railway Cup titles between 1949 and 1951. Fleming completely retired from hurling following Munster's win over Leinster in the 1949 Railway Cup final.

== Death ==
Fleming died on 27 March 2011, aged 94.

== Honours ==
Mount Sion

- Waterford Senior Hurling Championship (6): 1939, 1940, 1943, 1945, 1948, 1949
- Waterford Junior Football Championship (1): 1939

Stradbally

- Waterford Senior Football Championship (5): 1940, 1941, 1942, 1943, 1944

Waterford

- All-Ireland Senior Hurling Championship (1): 1948
- Munster Senior Hurling Championship (1): 1948

Munster

- Railway Cup (7): 1943, 1944, 1945, 1946, 1949, 1950, 1951
