= Seán Feeney =

Irish hurler (1912–1970)

John Joseph "Seán" Feeney (3 April 1912 – 21 September 1970) was an Irish hurler. At club level he played for Ballyduff and was midfield partner to Christy Moylan on the Waterford senior hurling team that lost the 1938 All-Ireland final.
