= Mullagh =

Mullagh may refer to:

== Places in Ireland ==
- Mullagh, County Cavan
- Mullagh, County Clare
- Mullagh, County Down, a townland in the civil parish of Killyleagh, County Down, Northern Ireland
- Mullagh, County Galway
- Mullagh, County Londonderry, a townland in County Londonderry, Northern Ireland
- Mullagh, County Meath, see List of townlands of County Meath
- Mullagh, County Tyrone, a townland in the civil parish of Ardstraw, County Tyrone, Northern Ireland

== Other uses ==
- Johnny Mullagh (1841-1891), Australian cricketer
- Mullagh GAA, a Gaelic Athletic Association club based in the parish of Mullagh, County Galway, Ireland
