= 1948 All-Ireland Senior Hurling Championship final =

1948 All-Ireland Senior Hurling Final
- Event: 1948 All-Ireland Senior Hurling Championship
| Waterford | Dublin |
| 6–7 | 4–2 |
- Date: 5 September 1948
- Venue: Croke Park, Dublin
- Referee: Con Murphy (Cork)
- Attendance: 61,742

The 1948 All-Ireland Senior Hurling Championship Final was the 61st All-Ireland Final and the culmination of the 1948 All-Ireland Senior Hurling Championship, an inter-county hurling tournament for the top teams in Ireland. The match was held at Croke Park, Dublin, on 5 September 1948, between Waterford and Dublin. The Leinster champions lost to their Munster opponents on a score line of 6–7 to 4–2.

A medal won by one of the Waterford players went missing during a burglary in County Wexford in November 2022.

== Match details ==
1948-09-05
15:15 BST

| Waterford | 6-7 – 4-2 | Dublin |

Croke Park, Dublin
Attendance: 61,742
Referee: C. Murphy (Cork)

Dublin team

- 1 K. Matthews
- 2 N. Dunphy
- 3 D. Walsh
- 4 S. Cronin
- 5 T. Herbert
- 6 J. Butler
- 7 P. Donnelly
- 8 M. Hassett
- 9 L. Donnelly
- 10 J. Kennedy
- 11 D. Cantwell
- 12 S. Óg Ó Ceallacháin
- 13 M. Williams
- 14 J. Prior
- 15 F. Cummins (c)

Substitutes
16 J. O'Callaghan
17 S. Coughlan
18 O. Keeley
19 P. Thornton
20 C. Keeley
21 J. Drumgoole
22 D. Dillon

Waterford Team

1 Jim Ware 2 Andy Fleming 3 John Cusack 4 Jackie Goode 5 Mick Hickey 6 Vin Baston 7 Mick Hayes 8 Johnny O'Connor 9 Eddie Carew 10 Kevin O'Connor 11 John Keane 12 Christy Moylan 13 Billy Galvin 14 Eddie Daly 15 Tom Curran Substitutes 16 Patrick Waters 17 James Galvin 18 Joseph Murphy 19 Patrick Neville 20 Larry Fanning 21 Michael Healy 22 Michael Feeney Manager/Selector Charlie Ware snr Trainer Jim Ware
