= 1948 All-Ireland Senior Hurling Championship =

All-Ireland champions
- Winning team: Waterford (1st win)
- Captain: Jim Ware

All-Ireland Finalists
- Losing team: Dublin
- Captain: Frank Cummins

Provincial champions
- Munster: Waterford
- Leinster: Dublin
- Ulster: Antrim
- Connacht: Not Played

Championship statistics
- Top Scorer: John Keane (4–8); Jimmy Kennedy (4–8)
- All-Star Team: See here

The 1948 All-Ireland Senior Hurling Championship was the 62nd staging of the All-Ireland hurling championship since its establishment by the Gaelic Athletic Association in 1887. The championship began on 16 May 1948 and ended on 5 September 1948.

Kilkenny entered the championship as the defending champions, however, they were beaten by Laois in the Leinster semi-finals.

The All-Ireland final was played on 5 September 1948 at Croke Park in Dublin, between Waterford and Dublin, in what was their second meeting in the final overall and a first meeting in the final in 10 years. Waterford won the match by 6–07 to 4–02 to claim their first ever All-Ireland title

== Format ==
The All-Ireland Senior Hurling Championship was run on a provincial basis as usual. All games were played on a knockout basis whereby once a team lost they were eliminated from the championship. The format for the All-Ireland series of games ran as follows:

- The winners of the Leinster Championship advanced directly to the first All-Ireland semi-final.
- The winners of the Munster Championship advanced directly to the second All-Ireland semi-final.
- Antrim, the representatives from the Ulster Championship, were drawn to play the Leinster champions in the All-Ireland semi-final.
- Galway, a team who faced no competition in the Connacht Championship, entered the championship at the All-Ireland semi-final stage where they were drawn to play the Munster champions.

== Provincial championships ==
=== Leinster Senior Hurling Championship ===
First round

16 May 1948 First round	Wexford	8–05 – 2–04	Offaly	St. James' Park, Kilkenny
	N Rackard 4–0, Paddy Kehoe 2–1, Kielty 1–1, Fenlon 1–0, Murphy 0–2, Padge Kehoe 0–2.		Sheeran 1–2, Geraghty 1–0, Burke 0–1, Marshall 0–1.

23 May 1948 First round	Laois	7–10 – 3–00	Westmeath	O'Connor Park, Tullamore
	White 2–4, F Moloney 2–0, McCabe 2–0, H Gray 1–3, P O'Brien 0–3.		Fitzsimons 1–0, Fagan 1–0, Callaghan 1–0.

Semi-finals

27 June 1948 Semi-final	Laois	4–05 – 2–07	Kilkenny	O'Moore Park, Portlaoise
	P Lalor 3–0, H Gray 0–4, F Moloney 1–0, P O'Brien 0–1.		J Langton 0–5, T Walton 1–1, J Mulcahy 1–1.

27 June 1948 Semi-final	Wexford	3–09 – 6–04	Dublin	Enniscorthy
	Fenlon 2–0, Paddy Kehoe 1–0, T Russell 0–3, N Rackard 0–3, Stamp 0–2, B Rackard 0–1.		J Kennedy 1–2, D Cantwell 1–1, S Óg Ó Ceallacháin 1–1, M Williams 1–0, J Prior 1–0, F Cummins 1–0.

Final

11 July 1948 Final	Dublin	5–09 – 3–03	Laois	O'Connor Park, Tullamore
	M Williams 2–1, J Kennedy 1–2, P Thornton 1–1, J Prior 1–0, L Donnelly 0–3, S Óg Ó Ceallacháin 0–2.		F Moloney 1–1, H Gray 1–0, P Lalor 1–0, B Bohane 0–1, O'Brien 0–1.	Attendance: 25,719; Referee: J Flaherty (Offaly)

=== Munster Senior Hurling Championship ===
First round

27 June 1948 First round	Tipperary	6–04 – 8–04	Limerick	Cork Athletic Grounds, Cork
	J Devitt 2–1, H Goldsboro 2–0, AN Other 1–0, P Madden 1–0, W Carroll 0–1, T Doyle 0–2.		J Power 3–0, J McCarthy 2–0, D Stokes 1–2, J Mackey 1–0, T O'Brien 1–0, P Fitzgerald 0–1, J Mulcahy 0–1.	Referee: PJ Quane (Clare)

Semi-finals

23 May 1948 Semi-final	Waterford	4–08 – 5–03	Clare	Thurles Sportsfield, Thurles
	E Daly 2–0, V Baston 0–4, G Power 1–0, J O'Connor 1–0, J Keane 0–3, E Carew 0–1.		W McAllister 3–0, J Whelan 1–0, A Hannon 1–0, M Daly 0–2, M Murphy 0–1.	Referee: P Purcell (Tipperary)

18 July 1948 Semi-final	Cork	5–03 – 2–05	Limerick	Thurles Sportsfield, Thurles
	J Lynch 2–1, M O'Riordan 1–1, B Murphy 1–0, WJ Daly 1–0, E O'Sullivan 0–1.		J Power 1–0, D McCarthy 1–0, D Stokes 0–2, M Ryan 0–1, T O'Brien 0–1, Sadlier 0–1.	Referee: PJ Quane (Clare)

Final

1 August 1948 Final	Waterford	4–07 – 3–09	Cork	Thurles Sportsfield, Thurles
	T Curran 1–1, W Galvin 1–0, J O'Connor 1–0, C Moylan 1–0, J Keane 0–3, D Carew 0–2, V Baston 0–1.		C Ring 1–4, J Lynch 1–1, W Murphy 1–0, WJ Daly 0–3, C Murphy 0–1.	Referee: J Roche (Limerick)

== All-Ireland Senior Hurling Championship ==
=== All-Ireland semi-finals ===
1 August 1948 Semi-final	Dublin	8–13 – 2–06	Antrim	Croke Park, Dublin
	J Prior 3–2, M Williams 3–0, S Óg Ó Ceallacháin 1–4, F Cummins 1–1, M Hassett 0–4, J Kennedy 0–2.		McDonald 1–2, T Sheehan 1–0, Owens 0–1, Campbell 0–1, H Sheehan 0–1, D Cormican 0–1.	Referee: D O'Riordan (Kildare)

15 August 1948 Semi-final	Waterford	3–07 – 1–06	Galway	Croke Park
	J Keane 2–0, V Baston 1–1, W Galvin 0–2, C Moylan 0–2, E Carew 0–1, T Curran 0–1.		J Gallagher 1–4, Duignan 0–1, Hanniffy 0–1.	Attendance: 31,843; Referee: J Flaherty (Offaly)

=== All-Ireland Final ===
5 September 1948 Final	Waterford	6–07 – 4–02	Dublin	Croke Park, Dublin
	J Keane 2–2, W Galvin 2–0, C Moylan 1–3, E Daly 1–0, V Baston 0–1, K O'Connor 0–1.		J Kennedy 2–2, F Cummins 1–0, S Óg Ó Ceallacháin 1–0.	Attendance: 61,742; Referee: C Murphy (Cork)

== Championship statistics ==
=== Top scorers ===
Overall

Rank	Player	County	Tally	Total	Matches	Average
1	John Keane	Waterford	4-08	20	4	5.00
1	Jimmy Kennedy	Tipperary	4-08	20	4	5.00
2	Mickey Williams	Dublin	6-01	19	4	4.75
3	Jim Prior	Dublin	5-02	17	4	4.25
4	Seán Óg Ó Ceallacháin	Dublin	3-07	16	4	4.00
5	Nicky Rackard	Wexford	4-03	15	2	7.50
6	Fint Moloney	Laois	4-01	13	3	4.66
6	Harry Gray	Laois	2-07	13	3	4.66
7	Jackie Power	Limerick	4-00	12	2	6.00
7	Paddy Lalor	Laois	4-00	12	3	4.00

In a single game

Rank	Player	County	Tally	Total	Opposition
1	Nicky Rackard	Wexford	4-00	12	Offaly
2	Jim Prior	Dublin	3-02	11	Antrim
3	Liam White	Laois	2-04	10	Westmeath
4	Paddy Lalor	Laois	3-00	9	Kilkenny
4	Jackie Power	Limerick	3-00	9	Tipperary
4	Willie McAllister	Clare	3-00	9	Waterford
4	Mickey Williams	Dublin	3-00	9	Antrim
5	John Keane	Waterford	2-02	8	Dublin
5	Jimmy Kennedy	Dublin	2-02	8	Waterford
6	Paddy Kehoe	Wexford	2-01	7	Offaly
6	Mickey Williams	Dublin	2-01	7	Laois
6	Jim Devitt	Tipperary	2-01	7	Limerick
6	Jack Lynch	Cork	2-01	7	Limerick
6	Christy Ring	Cork	1-04	7	Waterford
6	Seán Óg Ó Ceallacháin	Dublin	1-04	7	Antrim
6	Josie Gallagher	Galway	1-04	7	Waterford

== Sources ==
- Corry, Eoghan, The GAA Book of Lists (Hodder Headline Ireland, 2005).
- Donegan, Des, The Complete Handbook of Gaelic Games (DBA Publications Limited, 2005).
