= Galway–Waterford hurling rivalry =

Hurling rivalry between two Irish teams

Galway-Waterford
- Location: County Galway; County Waterford
- Teams: Galway; Waterford
- First meeting: Waterford 4-8 - 3-1 Galway; 1938 All-Ireland semi-final (7 August 1938)
- Latest meeting: Galway 3-20 - 1-30 Waterford; 2021 All-Ireland qualifier (24 July 2021)

Statistics
- Total meetings: 12
- Top scorer: Joe Canning (1-24)
- All-time series: Galway 1-11 Waterford
- Largest victory: Waterford 7-11 - Galway 0-8; 1959 Munster quarter-final (29 June 1959)

The Galway-Waterford rivalry is a hurling rivalry between Irish county teams Galway and Waterford, who first played each other in 1938. The rivalry has been an infrequent one due to both teams playing in different provincial championships. Galway's home ground is Pearse Stadium and Waterford's home ground is Walsh Park, however, most of their championship meetings have been held at neutral venues.

== Statistics ==
Up to date as of 2023 season

Team	All-Ireland	Provincial	National League	Total
Galway	5	28	11	44
Waterford	2	9	4	15
Combined	7	36	13	59

== All time results ==
=== Legend ===
Galway win
Waterford win

=== Senior championship ===
No.	Date	Winners	Score	Runners-up	Venue	Stage
1.	7 August 1938	Waterford (1)	4-8 - 3-1	Galway	Cusack Park	All-Ireland semi-final
2.	15 August 1948	Waterford (2)	3-7 - 1-6	Galway	Croke Park	All-Ireland semi-final
3.	28 July 1957	Waterford (3)	4-12 - 0-11	Galway	Croke Park	All-Ireland semi-final
4.	29 June 1959	Waterford (4)	7-11 - 0-8	Galway	Gaelic Grounds	Munster quarter-final
5.	26 June 1960	Waterford (5)	9-8 - 4-8	Galway	Gaelic Grounds	Munster quarter-final
6.	3 July 1966	Waterford (6)	2-16 - 1-9	Galway	Gaelic Grounds	Munster semi-final
7.	26 July 1998	Waterford (7)	1-20 - 1-10	Galway	Croke Park	All-Ireland quarter-final
8.	2 July 2006	Waterford (8)	1-25 - 2-20	Galway	Walsh Park	All-Ireland qualifier
9.	26 July 2009	Waterford (9)	1-16 - 0-18	Galway	Semple Stadium	All-Ireland quarter-final
10.	25 July 2011	Waterford (10)	2-23 - 2-13	Galway	Semple Stadium	All-Ireland quarter-final
11.	3 September 2017	Galway (1)	0-26 - 2-17	Waterford	Croke Park	All-Ireland final
12.	24 July 2021	Waterford (11)	1-30 - 3-20	Galway	Semple Stadium	All-Ireland qualifiers
