= Gerry Coone =

Irish former sportsperson

Personal information
- Native name: Gearóid Ó Cuan (Irish)
- Born: Mullagh, County Galway
- Height: 5 ft 7 in (170 cm)

Sport
- Position: Right wing-forward
Club
- Years: Club
- 1960s–1980s: Mullagh
Inter-county
- Years: County
- 1970s: Galway
Inter-county titles
- All-Irelands: 0
- All Stars: 0
	Football	Hurling
League titles		1

Gerry Coone (born 1951 in Mullagh, County Galway) is an Irish former sportsperson. He played hurling with his local club Mullagh and was a member of the Galway senior inter-county team in the 1970s.
