= Joe Clarke (Galway hurler) =

Irish hurler

Personal information
- Native name: Seosamh Ó Cléireacháin (Irish)
- Born: Mullagh, County Galway
- Height: 5 ft 11 in (180 cm)

Sport
- Position: Full-back
Club
- Years: Club
- 1960s-1980s: Mullagh
Inter-county
- Years: County
- 1970s: Galway
Inter-county titles
- All-Irelands: 0
- All Stars: 0
| | Football | Hurling |
| League titles | | 1 |

Joe Clarke (born 23 April 1951) is a former Irish sportsperson. He played hurling with his local club Mullagh and was a member of the Galway senior inter-county team in the 1970s.
