= Mick Feeney =

Irish hurler

Michael Feeney was an Irish hurler. At club level he played for Ballyduff and was a substitute on the Waterford senior hurling team that won the 1948 All-Ireland Championship.
