= Ronan Glennon =

Irish hurler

Personal information
- Native name: Rónán Mag Leannáin (Irish)
- Nickname: Ronie
- Born: 1999 (age 26–27) Mullagh, County Galway, Ireland

Sport
- Sport: Hurling
- Position: Midfield
Club
- Years: Club
- Mullagh
Club titles
- Galway titles: 0
College
- Years: College
- Galway-Mayo Institute of Technology
College titles
- Fitzgibbon titles: 0
Inter-county*
| Years | County | Apps (scores) |
| 2022- | Galway | 0 (0-00) |
Inter-county titles
- Leinster titles: 1
- All-Irelands: 0
- NHL: 0
- All Stars: 0
- *Inter County team apps and scores correct as of 22:52, 4 March 2022.

Ronan Glennon (born 1999) is an Irish hurler who plays for Galway Championship club Mullagh and at inter-county level with the Galway senior hurling team.

== Career ==
Glennon first played hurling at juvenile and underage levels with Mullagh before eventually joining the club's senior team. He simultaneously lined out as a schoolboy with St Brigid's College in Loughrea and later with the Galway-Mayo Institute of Technology. Glennon first lined out at inter-county level during a two-year stint with the Galway minor hurling team. He lined out at right wing-back when Galway beat Cork in the 2017 All-Ireland minor final. Glennon later spent a season with the Galway under-20 hurling team before joining the senior team in advance of the 2022 National League.

== Career statistics ==
As of 27 February 2022.

| Team | Year | National League | | | Munster | | All-Ireland | | Total | |
| Team | Year | Division | Apps | Score | Apps | Score | Apps | Score | Apps | Score |
|---|---|---|---|---|---|---|---|---|---|---|
| Galway | 2022 | Division 1A | 3 | 0-04 | 0 | 0-00 | 0 | 0-00 | 3 | 0-04 |
| Career total | | | 3 | 0-04 | 0 | 0-00 | 0 | 0-00 | 3 | 0-04 |

== Honours ==
Galway

- All-Ireland Minor Hurling Championship: 2017
