= Pat Neville =

Irish hurler

Patrick Neville was an Irish hurler. At club level he played for Dungarvan and was a substitute on the Waterford senior hurling team that won the 1948 All-Ireland Championship.
