= Christy Moylan =

Waterford hurler

Personal information
- Born: Dungarvan, County Waterford
- Height: 5 ft 9 in (175 cm)

Sport
- Sport: Hurling
- Position: Forward
Club
- Years: Club
- Dungarvan
Club titles
- Waterford titles: 1
Inter-county
- Years: County
- 1935–1949: Waterford
Inter-county titles
- Munster titles: 2
- All-Irelands: 1
- All Stars: 1

Christopher "Christy" Moylan (4 December 1914 - 6 August 1996) was an Irish hurler who played for his local club Dungarvan and at senior level for the Waterford county team from 1935 until 1949.

== Playing career ==
=== Club ===
Moylan played his club hurling with his local club in Dungarvan, and won a senior county title with the club in 1941. This was Dungarvan's last victory in the county championship.

=== Inter-county ===
Moylan first joined the Waterford inter-county squad in the 1930s. He made his senior debut with the team in 1935.

In 1938, Moylan lined out in his first Munster final. The game saw Clare providing the opposition. In a close game, Waterford emerged as the victors on a score line of 3–5 to 2–5. Not only was it Moylan's first Munster Senior Hurling Championship medal, but it was also the first time that Waterford had won the provincial title. Waterford later beat Galway, allowing Moylan's side to advance to their first-ever All-Ireland final. Dublin provided the opposition in the final, and Declan Goode scored a goal for Waterford after just six minutes. However, Dublin fought back with goals of their own, and Dublin won on a score line of 2–5 to 1–6.

Waterford went into decline following this defeat. A two-point loss to Cork in the Munster final of 1943 was the only high point for Moylan.

In 1948, then years after their first provincial title, Waterford were back in the Munster final, this time against Cork. Waterford emerged victorious on a score line of 4–7 to 3-9 giving Moylan his second Munster medal. Galway fell again in the penultimate game of the championship, allowing Waterford to advance to the All-Ireland final. Just like ten years previously, Dublin provided the opposition. Once again Waterford got off to a good start and led by nine points at half-time. Four goals followed in the second-half courtesy of John Keane, Willie Galvin, Eddie Daly and Moylan. Waterford won on a score line of 6–7 to 4-2 giving Moylan his first All-Ireland Senior Hurling Championship medal.

Moylan continued playing in 1949, however, Waterford surrendered their provincial and All-Ireland crowns at the first hurdle. Moylan retired from inter-county hurling following this defeat.

=== Provincial ===
Moylan also lined out with Munster in the inter-provincial hurling competition. He first lined out for his province in 1937 and captured his first Railway Cup medal in 1937. It was the first of four inter-provincial titles in-a-row. Moylan won his fifth and final Railway Cup medal in 1942.

== Post-playing career ==
In retirement from playing Moylan maintained an interest in the game. Long after his playing days were over, his skill as a player was recognised when he was the recipient of the GAA All-Time All-Star award. Past winners of the award included Mick Mackey, Jack Lynch and Jim Langton.

| Preceded by Tommy Doyle (Tipperary) | GAA All-Time All-Star Award; 1987 | Succeeded by Paddy 'Fox' Collins (Cork) |
