= Willie Barron =

Irish hurler

William Barron (20 December 1914 – 22 July 1999) was an Irish hurler. At club level he played for Dungarvan, winning a Waterford Senior Championship title in 1941, and was the right wing-forward on the Waterford senior hurling team that lost the 1938 All-Ireland final.
