= Jimmy Mountain =

Irish hurler

James Mountain was an Irish hurler. At club level he played for Dungarvan, winning a Waterford Senior Championship title in 1941, and was the left wing-back on the Waterford senior hurling team that lost the 1938 All-Ireland final.
