= Séamus Coen =

Irish hurler

Personal information
- Native name: Séamus Ó Cadhain (Irish)
- Born: 1 February 1958 (age 68) Mullagh, County Galway, Ireland
- Occupations: Fitter and welder
- Height: 5 ft 10 in (178 cm)

Sport
- Sport: Hurling
- Position: Left wing-back
Club
- Years: Club
- Mullagh
Club titles
- Galway titles: 0
Inter-county
Years	County	Apps (scores)
1979–1986	Galway	13 (0-00)
Inter-county titles
- All-Irelands: 1
- NHL: 0
- All Stars: 1

Séamus Coen (born 1 February 1958) is an Irish retired hurler who played as a left wing-back for the Galway senior team.

Born in Mullagh, County Galway, Coen first played competitive hurling in his youth. After first joining the Galway under-21 team, he made his senior debut during the 1979 All-Ireland Senior Hurling Championship. Coen went on to win one All-Ireland Senior Hurling Championship medal and one National Hurling League medal with Galway. He was an All-Ireland runner-up on one occasion.

As a member of the Connacht inter-provincial team at various times throughout his career, Coen won two Railway Cup medal. At club level he played with Mullagh.

Throughout his career Coen made 13 championship appearances for Galway. His retirement came following the conclusion of the 1986 championship.

In retirement from playing, Coen became involved in team management and coaching. He has served as a selector with the Galway senior team and is currently a selector with the Mullagh hurling team.

== Playing career ==
=== Club ===
In 1982 Coen was at centre-back as Mullagh faced Tynagh in the final if the intermediate championship. A 3–13 to 1–8 victory gave him a championship medal.

=== Inter-county ===
Coen first played inter-county hurling as a member of the Galway under-21 team that reached the All-Ireland decider in 1978. Tipperary provided the opposition on that occasion, with the game ending in a draw. Galway won the replay on a 3–15 to 2–8 scoreline. It was Coen's first All-Ireland medal.

In 1979 Coen was in his final year on the under-21 team. Galway faced Tipperary in the All-Ireland decider for the second year in succession. Tipperary secured a 2–12 to 1–9 victory.

Coen made his senior championship debut for Galway in a 1–23 to 3–10 All-Ireland quarter-final defeat of Laois in 1979. However, he played no part in Galway's subsequent All-Ireland final defeat by Kilkenny.

In 1980 Coen was a regular member of the starting fifteen as Galway defeated Kildare and Offaly to reach a second consecutive All-Ireland final. Munster champions Limerick provided the opposition on this occasion. Bernie Forde and P. J. Molloy goals for Galway meant that they led by 2–7 to 1–5 at half-time. Éamonn Cregan single-handedly launched the Limerick counter-attack in the second-half. Over the course of the game he scored 2–7, including an overhead goal and a point in which he showed the ball to full-back Conor Hayes and nonchalantly drove the ball over the bar. It was not enough to stem the tide and Galway went on to win the game by 2–15 to 3–9. It was Galway's first All-Ireland title since 1923, with Coen picking up a winners' medal.

1981 saw Galway reach a third consecutive All-Ireland final and Offaly were the opponents. With twenty-three minutes left in the game Galway led by six points, however, they failed to score for the rest of the game. Johnny Flaherty hand-passed Offaly's second goal with just three minutes remaining. At the final whistle Galway were defeated by 2–12 to 0–15.

Galway shocked reigning All-Ireland champions Cork in the semi-final to reach the decider once again in 1985. Offaly provided the opposition in the subsequent All-Ireland final. Pat Cleary of Offaly scored the first of the day after twenty-five minutes of play and got his second less than half a minute after the restart. Joe Dooley had a goal disallowed halfway through the second-half while a long Joe Cooney effort, which seemed to cross the goal line, was not given. P. J. Molloy was Galway's goal scorer, however, the day belonged to Offaly. A 2–11 to 1–12 score line resulted in defeat for Galway. In spite of this defeat Coen picked up an All-Star award.

Coen played his last championship game for Galway in the 1986 All-Ireland quarter-final defeat of Kerry.

=== Inter-provincial ===
Coen also lined out with Connacht in the inter-provincial series of games and enjoyed much success.

In 1982 Coen was at right corner-back as Connacht reached the inter-provincial decider. A 3–8 to 2–9 defeat of Leinster gave Coen his first Railway Cup medal. Defeat of the same opposition in 1983 allowed Connacht to retain the title for the first time in their history, giving Coen a second Railway Cup medal.

== Managerial career ==
=== Galway ===
On 11 December 2002, Conor Hayes was appointed manager of the Galway senior team, with Coen joining the management team as selector. The highlight of his tenure with the backroom team was a shock 5–18 to 4–18 All-Ireland semi-final defeat of Kilkenny, however, Galway were later defeated by Cork in the All-Ireland decider.

=== Mullagh ===
In January 2014 Coen joined Mike McNamara's management team as a selector to the Mullagh senior hurling team.

== Honours ==
=== Player ===
Mullagh

- Galway Intermediate Hurling Championship (1): 1982

Galway

- All-Ireland Senior Hurling Championship (1): 1980
- All-Ireland Under-21 Hurling Championship (1): 1978

Connacht

- Railway Cup (2): 1982, 1983

=== Individual ===
Awards

- All-Star (1): 1985
