= Mick Healy =

Irish hurler

Michael Healy was an Irish hurler. At club level he played for Mount Sion and was a substitute on the Waterford senior hurling team that won the 1948 All-Ireland Championship.
