= Kevin Armstrong =

Kevin Armstrong may refer to:

- Kevin Armstrong (dual player)
- Kevin Armstrong (guitarist)
