= Iggy Clarke =

Galway hurler

Personal information
- Native name: Eighneachán Ó Cléireacháin (Irish)
- Born: Mullagh, County Galway
- Height: 5 ft 10 in (178 cm)

Sport
- Sport: Hurling
- Position: Half-back
Club
- Years: Club
- Mullagh
Inter-county
- Years: County
- 1972–1984: Galway
Inter-county titles
- All-Irelands: 1
- NHL: 1
- All Stars: 4

Iggy Clarke (born 1952 in Mullagh, County Galway) is an Irish former hurler who played for his local club Mullagh and at senior level for the Galway county team from 1972 until 1984. Clarke is regarded as one of Galway's greatest-ever players.

== Playing career ==
=== Club ===
Clarke played his club hurling with his local Mullagh club. He experienced little success with the club and never won a senior county title during his playing days.

=== Fitzgibbon Cup ===
A Student at St Patrick's College, Maynooth, he represented them in the Fitzgibbon Cup alongside Sean Silke (Galway) and Sean Stack (Clare), in an era when Maynooth won the Cup twice, and was runners up twice.

=== Inter-county ===
Clarke first came to prominence on the inter-county scene with the Galway minor team in the late 1960s. In 1970 Clarke's side reached the All-Ireland final; however, Galway were defeated by Cork on that occasion.

Clarke subsequently joined the county under-21 panel and enjoyed more success. In 1972 Galway reached the All-Ireland final in that grade. Dublin provided the opposition on that occasion; however, victory went to Galway and Clarke collected an All-Ireland Under-21 Hurling Championship medal.

By this stage Clarke had already made his debut with the Galway senior team. He first experienced major success in 1975 as Galway won the National Hurling League title. It was a sign of things to come for the team. Later that summer Clarke's side trounced Westmeath and shocked Cork to book their place in the All-Ireland final. Kilkenny, the reigning champions, provided the opposition on that occasion. Galway got off to a good start and took a 0–9 to 1–3 lead at half-time. Kilkenny, inspired by marvelous displays by Eddie Keher and Liam 'Chunky' O'Brien, powered on to win by 2–22 to 2–10. In spite of this defeat Clarke was later presented with his first All-Star award.

Galway faced a series of defeats at the penultimate stage of the championship for the next few seasons; however, Clarke captured a second All-Star award in 1978. The following year Galway shocked Cork in the All-Ireland semi-final for the second time of the decade. Once again the All-Ireland final saw Galway play Kilkenny. In one of the least exciting finals of the decade Galway continued their losing streak and capitulated to 'the Cats' by 2–12 to 1–8. In spite of the defeat Clarke claimed a third All-Star.

In 1980 Galway defeated Kildare and Offaly to reach a second consecutive All-Ireland final. However, disaster struck for Clarke in the game as he sustained a serious shoulder injury that meant he would miss the final. On that occasion Limerick provided the opposition. Galway got off to a good start with two goals and led by 2–7 to 1–5 at the interval. Limerick fought back in the second-half; however, Galway secured the victory by 2–15 to 3–9. It was Clarke's first All-Ireland medal and Galway's first since 1923. Despite missing the game, Clarke certainly wasn't forgotten and when captain Joe Connolly's memorable acceptance speech, delivered in Irish, referenced Clarke, the Galway crowd chanted his name until Connolly called him to hoist the Liam MacCarthy Cup with his 'good' right arm. The celebrations at Croke Park on that occasion surpassed anything that had ever been seen before. Clarke capped off the year by collecting a fourth All-Star award.

In 1981 both Galway and Limerick met in the All-Ireland semi-final; however, it took a replay to find a winner. Galway emerged to take part in their third All-Ireland final in-a-row. Offaly, a team that Clarke's side defeated on the way to the championship the previous year now provided the opposition. In another close encounter Galway looked set to make history as they took a six-point lead after the interval. The team, however, failed to score for the last twenty-three minutes and Offaly took their first All-Ireland title.

The next three seasons saw Galway defeated at the All-Ireland semi-final stage. Clarke retired from inter-county hurling in 1984.

=== Provincial ===
Clarke also lined out with Connacht in the inter-provincial hurling competition. He captured his first Railway Cup title in 1980 as Connacht defeated Munster. Clarke captured further Railway Cup medals in 1982 and 1983.

Achievements
Preceded by Pat McDonnell (Cork)	All-Ireland Under-21 HC winning captain 1972	Succeeded by Martin O'Doherty (Cork)
