= John Joe Doyle =

Irish hurler (1906–2000)

John Joe "Goggles" Doyle
Personal information
- Native name: Seán Seosamh Ó Dúil (Irish)
- Nickname: Goggles
- Born: 14 June 1906 Newmarket-on-Fergus, County Clare, Ireland
- Died: 11 August 2000 (aged 94) Nenagh, County Tipperary, Ireland
- Occupation: Social welfare worker

Sport
- Sport: Hurling
- Position: Left corner-back
Club
- Years: Club
- Newmarket-on-Fergus
Club titles
- Clare titles: 6
Inter-county
- Years: County
- 1926–1938: Clare
Inter-county titles
- Munster titles: 1
- All-Irelands: 0
- NHL: 0
- All Stars: 1

John Joe "Goggles" Doyle (14 June 1906 – 11 August 2000) was an Irish hurler who played as for the Clare senior team from 1926 to 1938. He was a left corner-back.

Doyle made his first appearance for the team during the 1926 championship and was a regular member of the starting fifteen until his retirement after the 1938 championship. During that time he won one Munster medal. Doyle was an All-Ireland runner-up on one occasion.

At club level Doyle was a six-time county club championship medalist with Newmarket-on-Fergus.

He was known as "Goggles" because of the goggles he designed and made to protect his glasses while hurling. They were made of bicycle spokes, medical bandages, and elastic.

In retirement from playing Doyle was recognised as one of a number of the "greatest players never to have won an All-Ireland medal". In 1990 Doyle was presented with the GAA All-Time All-Star Award.

== Playing career ==
=== Club ===
'Goggles' Doyle played his club hurling with his local club in Newmarket-on-Fergus. He won his first senior county title in 1925, the first of a three-in-a-row for Newmarket. Doyle captured another set of back-to-back county medals in 1930 and 1931. He won his sixth and final county championship title in 1936.

=== Inter-county ===
Doyle first came to prominence for the Clare senior inter-county team in 1926 when he made championship debut. Clare's campaign finished early that season; however, in 1927 Doyle's side reached the Munster final. Cork provided the opposition on that occasion and went on to win the game by 5–3 to 3–4.

1928 saw Clare take on Cork for the second consecutive year in the Munster final. That year Doyle's side nearly pulled off a shock result, however, both sides finished level after recording 2–2. The replay saw Clare beaten by Cork trounced 6–4 to 2–2.

Two years later in 1930 Doyle was back in the provincial decider. Tipperary were the opponents on that occasion, however, a scoreline of 6–4 to 2–8 gave victory to Tipperary.

In 1932 Doyle was appointed captain of the Clare senior hurling team. For the fourth time in six years Clare reached the Munster final. Once again, Cork, a team that had defeated Doyle's side on several occasions, provided the opposition. The game itself saw Clare triumph for the first time since 1914. A score line of 5–2 to 4–1 gave Doyle his first Munster medal. The subsequent All-Ireland semi-final saw Clare emerge victorious over Galway by 9–4 to 4–14. This victory allowed Clare to advance to the All-Ireland final where Kilkenny provided the opposition. In a low-scoring game, Clare's Tull Considine scored two goals and was foiled for what would almost certainly have been a third. These goals were negated by Kilkenny's three goal-scoring players Matty Power, Martin White and Lory Meagher. The final score of 3–3 to 2–3 gave victory to Kilkenny.

Clare went into decline following this game as Limerick emerged as the dominant force in Munster. In 1938 Doyle was back and played in his final provincial final. Waterford provided the opposition on that occasion and, once again, Clare almost escaped with the victory. Waterford, however, went on to win the game by 3–5 to 2–5. Doyle retired from inter-county hurling following this defeat.

=== Provincial ===
Doyle also lined out with Munster in the inter-provincial hurling competition. He first played for his province in 1929 as Munster defeated Leinster to win the Railway Cup. It was the first of three successive Railway Cup medals for Doyle. He won a fourth and final medal in 1934.

== Post-playing career ==
In retirement from playing 'Goggles' Doyle maintained an interest in the game. Long after his playing days were over, the Gaelic Athletic Association celebrated its centenary year in 1984. Throughout the year a series of special events were held while special team selections were also named. While a special GAA Hurling Team of the Century was named, a special team of players who never won an All-Ireland medal was also selected. Doyle's contribution as a player was recognised when he was picked in the left corner-back position on that team. Six years later in 1990, Doyle's reputation was further recognised when he was the recipient of the GAA All-Time All-Star award.

1995 was a special year for 89-year-old Doyle and for Clare hurling. That year's Munster final saw Clare captain Anthony Daly bridge a sixty-three-year gap since Doyle captained Clare to the provincial crown. Doyle was also present in Croke Park as Clare later defeated Offaly to win their first All-Ireland title since 1914.

Sporting positions
Preceded by	Clare Senior Hurling Captain; 1932	Succeeded by
Awards
Preceded by M.J. 'Inky' Flaherty (Galway)	GAA All-Time All-Star Award; 1990	Succeeded by Jackie Power (Limerick
