= Eddie Daly =

Irish hurler

Personal information
- Native name: Éamonn Ó Dálaigh (Irish)
- Born: 1918 (age 107–108) Lismore, County Waterford, Ireland
- Occupation: National school teacher
- Height: 5 ft 11 in (180 cm)

Sport
- Sport: Hurling
- Position: Full-forward
Clubs
- Years: Club
- Lismore; University College Dublin
Club titles
- Waterford titles: 2
College
- Years: College
- 1943-1948: University College Dublin
College titles
- Fitzgibbon titles: 2
Inter-county
- Years: County
- Waterford
Inter-county titles
- Munster titles: 1
- All-Irelands: 1
- NHL: 0

Eddie Daly (born 1918) was an Irish hurler who played as a full-forward for the Waterford senior team.

Born in Lismore, County Waterford, Daly first played competitive hurling in his youth. He joined the Waterford senior team during the 1938 championship. Daly subsequently became a regular member of the starting fifteen and won one All-Ireland medal and one Munster medal.

As a member of the Munster inter-provincial team on a number of occasions, Daly won three Railway Cup medals. At club level he was a two-time championship medallist with University College Dublin.

== Honours ==
=== Team ===
University College Dublin

- Dublin Senior Hurling Championship (2): 1947, 1948
- Fitzgibbon Cup (2): 1944, 1948

Waterford

- All-Ireland Senior Hurling Championship (1): 1948
- Munster Senior Hurling Championship (1): 1948
