= 1949 All-Ireland Senior Hurling Championship =

Championship details
- Dates: 15 May – 4 September 1949
- Teams: 14

All-Ireland champions
- Winning team: Tipperary (14th win)
- Captain: Pat Stakelum

All-Ireland Finalists
- Losing team: Laois
- Captain: Paddy Ruschitzko

Provincial champions
- Munster: Tipperary
- Leinster: Laois
- Ulster: Not Played
- Connacht: Not Played

Championship statistics
- No. matches played: 14
- Goals total: 83 (5.9 per game)
- Points total: 223 (15.9 per game)
- Top Scorer: Jimmy Kennedy (6–35)
- All-Star Team: See here

The 1949 All-Ireland Senior Hurling Championship was the 63rd staging of the All-Ireland hurling championship since its establishment by the Gaelic Athletic Association in 1887. The championship began on 15 May 1949 and ended on 4 September 1949.

Waterford were the defending champions, however, they were defeated in the provincial championship. Tipperary won the title following a 3–11 to 0–3 defeat of Laois.

== Teams ==
=== Team summaries ===
Team	Colours	Most recent success		
Team	Colours	All-Ireland	Provincial	League
Antrim	Saffron and white		1946	
Clare	Saffron and blue	1914	1932	1945–46
Cork	Red and white	1946	1947	1947–48
Dublin	Navy and blue	1938	1948	1938–39
Galway	Maroon and white	1923	1922	1930–31
Kilkenny	Black and amber	1947	1947	1932–33
Laois	Blue and white	1915	1915	
Limerick	Green and white	1940	1940	1946–47
Meath	Green and gold			
Offaly	Green, white and gold			
Tipperary	Blue and gold	1945	1945	1948–49
Waterford	Blue and white	1948	1948	
Westmeath	Maroon and white			
Wexford	Purple and gold	1910	1918	

== Provincial championships ==
=== Leinster Senior Hurling Championship ===
15 May 1949 Quarter-final	Wexford	1–04 – 4–11	Kilkenny	Wexford Park, Wexford
	Kielty 1–0, T Russell 0–3, Padge Kehoe 0–1.		T Leahy 0–7, J Walton 1–1, J Cahill 1–0, S Downey 1–0, M Fripps 1–0, J Langton 0–2, B Walsh 0–1,

15 May 1949 Quarter-final	Offaly	4–02 – 7–05	Laois	St. Brendan's Park, Birr
	M Ryan 1–0, Sheehan 1–0, Bermingham 1–0, Sheeran 1–0, Flannery 0–1, Grogan 0–1.		P Lalor 3–2, H Gray 2–0, Forde 1–0, P Kelly 1–0, W Bohane 0–3.

22 May 1949 Quarter-final	Meath	6–10 – 3–02	Westmeath	St. Loman's Park, Trim
	J Loughran 2–4, Kelly 2–1, M Brien 1–3, B Smyth 1–1.		Lenehan 2–0, J Daly 1–1, Gaffney 0–1.

Semi-finals

19 June 1949 Semi-final	Kilkenny	4–13 – 2–06	Meath	O'Moore Park, Portlaoise
	J Cahill 2–0, J Walton 1–2, J Langton 0–5, T Leahy 1–0, S Downey 0–3, S Clohessy 0–2, J Heffernan 0–1.		Gerrard 1–0, Kelly 1–0, T Donnelly 0–2, Loughran 0–2, Foran 0–1, B Smyth 0–1,

26 June 1949 Semi-final	Laois	6–06 – 3–07	Dublin	Nowlan Park, Kilkenny
	P Lalor 2–1, P Hogan 1–2, V Kelly 1–0, W Dargan 1–0, D Forde 1–0, J Styles 0–2, H Gray 0–1.		P Kennedy 2–1, M Williams 1–0, J Lynch 0–2, T Herbert 0–1, L Donnelly 0–1, M Lyons 0–1, N Drumgoole 0–1.	Referee: P Grace (Kilkenny)

Final

17 July 1949 Final	Kilkenny	3–06 – 3–08	Laois	Nowlan Park, Kilkenny
	S Downey 2–1, J Walton 1–0, J Langton 0–2, J Kelly 0–2, D Kennedy 0–1.		P O'Brien 1–0, P Lalor 1–0, P Hogan 1–0, H Gray 0–3, W Dargan 0–2, J Styles 0–1, T Byrne 0–1, W Bohane 0–1.	Attendance: 22,000; Referee: E Long (Carlow)

=== Munster Senior Hurling Championship ===
First round

29 May 1949 First round	Tipperary	3–10 – 3–10	Cork	Gaelic Grounds, Limerick
	J Kennedy 1–7, Carroll 1–0, S Maher 1–0, J Ryan 0–1, S Bannon 0–1, M Ryan 0–1.		J Lynch 1–6, B Murphy 1–2, G Murphy 1–0, WJ Daly 0–1, C Ring 0–1.

26 June 1949 First round replay	Tipperary	2–08 – 1–09 (aet)	Cork	Gaelic Grounds, Limerick
	J Kennedy 1–6, M Ryan 1–1, S Maher 0–1.		G Riordan 1–1, J Lynch 0–3, M Riordan 0–1, W Murphy 0–1, B Murphy 0–1, WJ Daly 0–1, J Hartnett 0–1.

Semi-finals

12 June 1949 Semi-final	Limerick	3–08 – 3–03	Waterford	Thurles Sportsfield, Thurles
	J Power 2–0, G Fitzgerald 1–1, D Stokes 0–3, Mulcahy 0–2, E Stokes 0–1, T Cregan 0–1.		Galvin 1–1, K O'Connor 1–0, T Curran 1–0, J Keane 0–2.

3 July 1949 Semi-final	Tipperary	1–15 – 1–07	Clare	Gaelic Grounds, Limerick
	J Kennedy 0–7, M Ryan 1–2, T Ryan 0–3, P Kenny 0–2, B Stakelum 0–1.		W McAllister 1–2, J Minogue 0–2, M Daly 0–2, M Nugent 0–1.

Final

17 July 1949 Final	Tipperary	1–16 – 2–10	Limerick	Cork Athletic Grounds, Cork
	J Kennedy 0–11, T Ryan 0–4, S Bannon 1–0, M Ryan 0–1.		D Stokes 0–5, Maher 1–1, J Power 1–1, E Stokes 0–1, Boland 0–1, Mulcahy 0–1.	Attendance: 35,000

== All-Ireland Senior Hurling Championship ==
=== All-Ireland semi-finals ===
31 July 1949 Semi-final	Tipperary	6–18 – 1–4	Antrim	Croke Park, Dublin
	J Kennedy 3–5, S Maher 3–3, T Ryan 0–4, M Ryan 0–4, P Shanahan 0–1, J Ryan 0–1.		McDonnell 1–0, Campbell 0–2, H Sheehan 0–1, Fogarty 0–1.

7 August 1949 Semi-final	Laois	4–6 – 3–5	Galway	Croke Park, Dublin
	H Gray 2–2, P Kelly 2–0, J Styles 0–2, P Lalor 0–1, P Hogan 0–1.		J Gallagher 1–4, F Duignan 1–0, T Moroney 1–0, J Killeen 0–1.	Referee: C Murphy (Cork)

=== All-Ireland Final ===
4 September 1949 Final	Tipperary	3–11 – 0–3	Laois	Croke Park, Dublin
	J Kennedy 2–4, P Kenny 1–2, S Kenny 0–2, P Stakelum 0–1, P Shanahan 0–1, T Ryan 0–1.		J Styles 0–2, B Dargan 0–1.	Attendance: 67,168

== Championship statistics ==
=== Top scorers ===
Overall

Rank	Player	County	Tally	Total	Matches	Average
1	Jimmy Kennedy	Tipperary	7–40	61	6	10.16
2	Paddy Lalor	Laois	6-04	22	5	4.40
3	Harry Gray	Laois	4-06	18	5	3.60
4	Sonny Maher	Tipperary	4-04	16	6	2.66
5	Mick Ryan	Tipperary	2-09	15	6	2.50
6	Shem Downey	Kilkenny	3-04	13	3	4.33
7	Jim Walton	Kilkenny	3-03	12	3	4.00
7	Jim Loughran	Meath	2-06	12	2	6.00
7	Jack Lynch	Cork	1-09	12	2	6.00
7	Tommy Ryan	Tipperary	0–12	12	6	2.00

In a single game

Rank	Player	County	Tally	Total	Opposition
1	Jimmy Kennedy	Tipperary	3-05	14	Antrim
2	Sonny Maher	Tipperary	3-03	12	Antrim
3	Paddy Lalor	Laois	3-02	11	Offaly
3	Jimmy Kennedy	Tipperary	0–11	11	Limerick
4	Jimmy Kennedy	Tipperary	2-04	10	Laois
4	Jim Loughran	Meath	2-04	10	Westmeath
4	Jimmy Kennedy	Tipperary	1-07	10	Cork
5	Jack Lynch	Cork	1-06	9	Tipperary
5	Jimmy Kennedy	Tipperary	1-06	9	Cork
6	Harry Gray	Laois	2-02	8	Galway

=== Scoring ===
- Widest winning margin: 29 points
  - Tipperary 6–18 – 1–4 Antrim (All-Ireland semi-final, 31 July 1949)
- Most goals in a match: 11
  - Offaly 4–2 – 7–5 Laois (Leinster quarter-final, 15 May 1949)
- Most points in a match: 26
  - Tipperary 1–16 – 2–10 Limerick (Munster final, 17 July 1949)
- Most goals by one team in a match: 7
  - Laois 7–5 – 4–2 Offaly (Leinster quarter-final, 15 May 1949)
- Most goals scored by a losing team: 4
  - Offaly 4–2 – 7–5 Laois (Leinster quarter-final, 15 May 1949)
- Most points scored by a losing team: 10
  - Limerick 2–10 – 1–16 Tipperary (Munster final, 17 July 1949)

=== Miscellaneous ===
- Laois win the Leinster championship for the first time since 1915.
- The All-Ireland final meeting of Laois and Tipperary is their first ever championship meeting.

== Sources ==
- Corry, Eoghan, The GAA Book of Lists (Hodder Headline Ireland, 2005).
- Donegan, Des, The Complete Handbook of Gaelic Games (DBA Publications Limited, 2005).
- Sweeney, Éamonn, Munster Hurling Legends (The O'Brien Press, 2002).
