= All-Time All Star Award (football) =

The All-Time All Star Award in Football was an award given on an annual basis to a sportsperson who had made a long-running and considerable contribution to the sport of Gaelic football in Ireland. In existence from 1980 until 1994 the award was presented to a former player who, more than likely, would have received an All Star had the awards scheme been in existence during their playing days.

== List of winners ==
Year	Recipients	County
1980	Larry Stanley	Kildare
1981	Tommy Murphy	Laois
1982	Paddy Moclair	Mayo
1983	Jim McCullough	Armagh
1985	J.J. 'Purty' Landers; Tim 'Roundy' Landers	Kerry
1986	Alf Murray	Armagh
1987	Mick Higgins	Cavan
1988	Kevin Armstrong	Antrim
1989	Peter McDermott	Meath
1990	Eddie Boyle	Louth
1991	Seán Purcell	Galway
1992	Seán Flanagan	Mayo
1993	Jimmy Murray	Roscommon
1994	Bill Delaney	Laois

== See also ==
- All-Time All Star Award (hurling)
