= Bobby Rackard =

Wexford hurler (1927–1996)

Personal information
- Native name: Riobaird Mac Riocaird (Irish)
- Nickname: Bobby
- Born: 6 January 1927 Killane, County Wexford, Ireland
- Died: 19 October 1996 (aged 69) Killane, County Wexford, Ireland
- Occupation: Farmer

Sport
- Sport: Hurling
- Position: Right corner-back
Club
- Years: Club
- Rathnure
Club titles
- Wexford titles: 4
Inter-county
- Years: County
- 1945–1957: Wexford
Inter-county titles
- Leinster titles: 4
- All-Irelands: 2
- NHL: 1

Robert "Bobby" Rackard (6 January 1927 – 19 October 1996) was an Irish hurler who played as a right corner-back for the Wexford senior team.

Rackard made his first regular appearance for the team during the 1947 championship and was a regular member of the starting fifteen until his retirement before the 1957 championship. During that time he won two All-Ireland medals, four Leinster medals and one National Hurling League medal. Rackard was an All-Ireland runner-up on two occasions.

At club level, Rackard was a four-time county club championship medalist with Rathnure.

Rackard's brothers, Nicky and Billy, also experienced All-Ireland success with Wexford.

== Playing career ==
=== Club ===
Rackard played his club hurling with Rathnure and enjoyed much success in a lengthy career.

In 1948 he was a key member of the defence as Rathnure reached only their second championship decider ever. A 3–5 to 0–2 trouncing of reigning champions St. Aidan's gave Rackard his first championship medal.

After failing to retain their title the following year, Rathnure were back in the county decider once again in 1950. Another convincing 5–10 to 2–6 defeat of old rivals St. Aidan's gave Rackard his second championship medal.

It was 1955 before Rathnure qualified for another championship decider and four-in-a-row hopefuls St. Aidan's provided the opposition once again. A close game developed, however, a 2–9 to 2–5 victory gave Rackard a third championship medal.

After a number of years out of the limelight Rathnure reached the county final once again in 1961. A fourth defeat of St. Aidan's gave Rackard, who scored two goals from his full-forward berth, a fourth and final championship medal.

=== Inter-county ===
Rackard first came to prominence on the inter-county scene as a member of the Wexford minor hurling team in the early 1940s. He enjoyed little success in this grade but was called up to the senior team in 1947.

After losing the provincial final in 1950, Rackard was at centre-back the following year as Wexford faced Laois in the eastern decider. A 3–12 to 4–3 victory gave him his first Leinster medal as Wexford claimed the provincial crown for the first time since 1918. The subsequent All-Ireland decider saw three-in-a-row hopefuls Tipperary providing the opposition. Nicky Rackard's goal-scoring ability was quelled by Tipp goalkeeper Tony Reddin, while Séamus Bannon, Tim Ryan and Paddy Kenny scored key goals which powered Tipp to a 7–7 to 3–9 victory.

After back-to-back Leinster defeats over the next two years, Wexford faced Dublin in the 1954 decider. A huge 8-5 to 1–4 victory gave Rackard his second Leinster medal. A record crowd of 84,856 attended the subsequent All-Ireland decider with Cork providing the opposition. Wexford had a four-point lead with seventeen minutes left to play, however, history was against Rackard's side when Johnny Clifford scored the winning goal for Cork with just four minutes left. A 1–9 to 1–6 victory secured a third successive All-Ireland for Cork.

In 1955 Wexford continued their provincial dominance with Rackard collecting a third Leinster medal following a 5–6 to 3–9 defeat of Kilkenny in a replay of the Leinster final. Galway, who got a bye into the final without picking up a hurley, provided the opposition and took a half-time lead. A Tim Flood goal nine minutes from the end clinched a 3–13 to 2–8 victory and a first All-Ireland medal for Rackard. It was Wexford's first All-Ireland triumph in forty-five years.

Rackard added a National Hurling League medal to his collection in 1956 as Tipperary were bested by 5–9 to 2–14. The subsequent championship campaign saw Wexford reach the provincial final once again. A narrow 4–8 to 3–10 defeat of Kilkenny gave Rackard his fourth and final Leinster medal. Galway fell heavily in the All-Ireland semi-final, allowing Wexford to advance to an All-Ireland final meeting with Cork. The game has gone down in history as one of the all-time classics as Christy Ring was bidding for a record ninth All-Ireland medal. The game turned on one important incident as the Wexford goalkeeper, Art Foley, made a miraculous save from a Ring shot and cleared the sliotar up the field to set up another attack. Nicky Rackard scored a crucial goal with two minutes to go giving Wexford a 2–14 to 2–8 victory. In spite of Cork's loss Wexford's Nick O'Donnell and Rackard, in an unparalleled display of sportsmanship in any game, raised Christy Ring onto their shoulders and carried him off the field. Wexford had won the game and Rackard had collected his second All-Ireland medal but there was no doubt in their minds that the real hero was Ring.

A farm accident in 1957 brought an end to Rackard's inter-county career.

=== Inter-provincial ===
Rackard also had the honour of being selected for Leinster in the inter-provincial series of games and enjoyed some success.

In 1956 he lined out in his only inter-provincial decider. A 5–11 to 1–7 trouncing of Munster gave Rackard a Railway Cup medal.

== Post-playing career ==
In retirement Rackard, along with his brothers Nicky and Billy, came to be regarded as one of the greatest hurling families of all time. In 1984, the centenary year of the foundation of the Gaelic Athletic Association, he was named on the Hurling Team of the Century selection. In 1992 both Billy and Bobby Rackard's brilliance was recognised when they were presented with the All-Time All-Star Award for hurling. Rackard was also posthumously named on the Hurling Team of the Millennium in 1999.

== Honours ==
=== Team ===
Rathnure

- Wexford Senior Club Hurling Championship (1): 1948, 1950, 1955, 1961

Wexford

- All-Ireland Senior Hurling Championship (2): 1955, 1956
- Leinster Senior Hurling Championship (4): 1951, 1954, 1955, 1956
- National Hurling League (1): 1955–56

Leinster

- Railway Cup (1): 1956

Awards
| Preceded by Jackie Power (Limerick) | GAA All-Time All-Star Award shared with Billy Rackard; 1992 | Succeeded by Pat Stakelum (Tipperary) |
