= Michael John Flaherty =

Galway hurler

Inky Flaherty
Personal information
- Native name: M. S. Ó Flaithearta (Irish)
- Nickname: Inky
- Born: 27 September 1917 Galway, Ireland
- Died: 20 May 1992 (aged 74)
- Occupation: Psychiatric nurse

Sport
- Sport: Hurling
- Position: Half back
Clubs
- Years: Club
- Liam Mellows; Ballinasloe
Club titles
- Galway titles: 2 (1 Mellows, 1 Ballinasloe)
Inter-county
Years	County	Apps (scores)
1936–1953	Galway	18
Inter-county titles
- All-Irelands: 0
- NHL: 1

M. J. "Inky" Flaherty (27 September 1917 – 20 May 1992) was an Irish hurler who played at senior level for the Galway county team from 1936 until 1953, and was also a noted boxer. Flaherty trained the Galway hurling team in the 1950s, and again in the 1970s, leading the side to league success in 1975. Starting out playing hurling for the Liam Mellows club, Flaherty went on to spend most of his inter-club days representing Ballinasloe in both hurling and football. Also contributing as a coach and referee, his lifelong dedication to the GAA was recognized in 1989 when he was presented with a GAA All-Time All-Star Award. The currently uncontested Connacht Senior Hurling Championship was named in his honour.

== Playing career ==
A native of Bohermore in Galway city, Inky played in his first county championship final for Liam Mellows in 1935. Only 17 years old, he scored three goals, helping Mellows to their first county senior hurling title. After moving to Ballinasloe in 1940 for work purposes, Flaherty joined St Brigid's hurling team, Ballinasloe, which made the transition to senior level that same year. With Ballinasloe he reached another county championship final in 1943, but was denied the win by his former club, Liam Mellows. He finally got a county hurling medal with Ballinasloe when they won the championship in 1951.

Flaherty played inter-county hurling for Galway from 1936 to 1953, captaining the side to a National Hurling League title in 1951 in New York. He also won a Railway Cup (inter-provincial) medal with Connacht in 1947.

== Refereeing career ==
Flaherty was also a referee, regularly officiating club and county matches at different levels throughout the 1940s, 1950s and 1960s. He refereed the 1949 All-Ireland Senior Hurling Championship Final, a clash between Tipperary and Laois, which saw Tipp winning the first of three consecutive titles by a scoreline of 3–11 to 0–3. At the age of 32, Flaherty was yet to contest a hurling final of his own.

Achievements
Preceded by Jim Barry	All-Ireland MHC Final referee 1946	Succeeded by John Conroy
Preceded by Con Murphy	All-Ireland SHC Final referee 1949	Succeeded by Con Murphy
