= Kevin Armstrong (dual player) =

Irish hurler and Gaelic footballer (1922–1992)

Personal information
- Native name: Caoimhín Ó Labhradha Tréan (Irish)
- Nickname: Army
- Born: Belfast, County Antrim

Sport
- Football Position: Forward
- Hurling Position: Forward
Club
- Years: Club
- O'Connell's
Club titles
| | Football | Hurling |
| Antrim titles | 1 | 4 |
Inter-county
- Years: County
- 1940s–1951 1940–1961: Antrim (F); Antrim (H)
Inter-county titles
| | Football | Hurling |
| Ulster Titles | 2 | 8 |
| All-Ireland Titles | 0 | 0 |

Kevin Armstrong (1922–1992), known as "Army", was a dual player who played football and hurling for his local club O'Connell's and for the Antrim senior inter-county teams in both codes from the 1940s until the 1960s.

He was one of the greatest players never to have won an All-Ireland hurling medal, as seen through the Gaelic Athletic Association's centenary year in 1984 when a special Hurling Team of the Century was named. Composed of players who never won an All-Ireland medal, Armstrong was among the fifteen, at left wing-forward. Four years later, his reputation as a footballer was further cemented when he was the recipient of the GAA All-Time All-Star Award.

== Playing career ==
=== Club ===
Armstrong played his club hurling and football with O'Connell's. He first tasted success with the club's hurling team in 1940. That year he won his first senior county title, the first of three county victories in-a-row for Armstrong. He won a fourth county hurling medal in 1945. Two years later in 1947 Armstrong captured a senior county title with the O'Connell's football team.

=== Inter-county ===
Armstrong first came to prominence on the inter-county scene with the Antrim senior hurling team in 1940. He made his debut for the team that year and later collected his first Ulster title following a 4–4 to 1–3 defeat of Down. Ulster hurling, however, was the poor relation of the other three provinces and, as such, the provincial champions were not allowed to contest the senior All-Ireland series of games. The following year Down captured the Ulster title before the Ulster Championship was abandoned in 1942.

In 1943 the senior hurling championship faced a number of problems. Chief amongst these was that the Emergency forced the All-Ireland minor and junior to be cancelled, resulting in the Ulster teams having no hurling competition. Because of this the Ulster champions were allowed to participate in the All-Ireland senior championship for the first time since 1925. That year Armstrong collected his second Ulster title before lining out against Galway in the All-Ireland quarter-final. That game, played at Corrigan Park in Belfast, threw up a surprise result as Antrim defeated Galway by 7–0 to 6–2. This allowed Armstrong's side to advance to an All-Ireland semi-final meeting with Kilkenny and, once again, the game was played at Corrigan Park. It was another historic win for Antrim as 'the Cats' were defeated by 3–3 to 1–6 in a major shock For the first time a team from Ulster had qualified for the All-Ireland final. Cork, the champions of the previous two years, provided the opposition on this occasion. Before the game, the economic realities of the time surfaced. Jimmy Walsh, the Antrim captain presented a quantity of butter to the Cork captain, Seán Condon, who in turn presented his counterpart with a quantity of tea. Once the pre-match festivities were over the game began and Cork crushed Antrim by 5–16 to 0–4.

In 1944 Armstrong added a third Ulster medal to his collection. It was the first of six provincial titles in-a-row for Armstrong and his county, however, on each occasion Antrim were heavily defeated in the All-Ireland semi-final. Following their defeat in 1949 the Ulster championship was abolished.

By this stage, however, Armstrong had become a key player on the Antrim senior football team. In 1946 he captured his first Ulster title with the 'big ball' code as Antrim defeated Cavan who were attempting to capture an eighth Ulster title in-a-row. Armstrong's side later lined out against Kerry in the All-Ireland semi-final. The game was an exciting one; however, victory went to the Munster men by 2–7 to 0–10.

Five years later in 1951 Armstrong collected a second Ulster football medal as Antrim triumphed over Cavan once again. The subsequent All-Ireland semi-final saw Antrim take on Meath. Armstrong ended up on the losing side again as Meath won by 2–6 to 1–7.

Armstrong retired from inter-county football some years later; however, he continued lining out for his county's hurling team until 1961.

=== Provincial ===
Armstrong also lined out with Ulster in the inter-provincial hurling and football competitions. He captured his first Railway Cup medal with the Ulster footballers in 1942 as Ulster defeated Munster. This success was repeated in 1943 with a victory over Leinster. Armstrong captured two more Railway Cup medals in 1947 and 1950 as Ulster triumphed over Leinster in both finals. Armstrong also lined out with the Ulster hurling team, however, he had little success.

== Honours ==
Hurling

- Ulster Senior Hurling Championship (8) 1940 1942 1943 1944 1945 1946 1947 1948
- Antrim Senior Hurling Championship (4) 1940 1941 1943 1945
- National Hurling League Division 2 (1) 1956

Football

- Ulster Senior Football Championship (2) 1946 1951
- Dr McKenna Cup (4) 1941 1942 1945 1946
- Dr Lagan Cup (3) 1944 1946 1948
- Antrim Senior Football Championship (1) 1947
- Railway Cup 1942 1943 1947 1950

== Post-playing career ==
In retirement from playing Armstrong maintained a keen interest in Gaelic games.

Awards
| Preceded by Mick Higgins (Cavan) | GAA All-Time All-Star Award in Football; 1988 | Succeeded by Peter McDermott (Meath |
