= Hurling Team of the Century =

Hypothetical best team in hurling

The Hurling Team of the Century was chosen as part of the Gaelic Athletic Association's centenary year celebrations in 1984 to comprise, as a fifteen-member side divided as one goalkeeper, three full-backs, three half-backs, two midfielders, three half-forwards and three full-forwards, the best hurling players of the first one hundred years of the Gaelic Athletic Association. The players on the team were nominated by Sunday Independent readers and were selected by a panel of experts and former players.

A team was also selected of players who had never won an All Ireland.

Position	Player	County team	Club team(s)	Team number	All-Ireland SHC, NHL, All-Stars and other awards
Goalkeeper	Tony Reddin	Tipperary (1947–1957)	Mullagh (Galway); Lorrha (Tipperary)	1	All-Ireland SHC (1949, 1950, 1951); Munster SHC (1949, 1950, 1951); National Hurling League (1949, 1950, 1952, 1954)
Right corner-back	Bobby Rackard	Wexford (1945–1957)	Rathnure	2	All-Ireland SHC (1955, 1956); Leinster SHC (1951, 1954, 1955, 1956); National Hurling League (1956)
Full-back	Nick O'Donnell	Wexford (1951–1960)	Éire Óg (Kilkenny); St. Aidan's (Wexford)	3	All-Ireland SHC (1955, 1956, 1960); Leinster SHC (1951, 1954, 1955, 1956, 1960, 1962); National Hurling League (1956, 1958); Texaco Hurler of the Year (1960)
Left corner-back	John Doyle	Tipperary (1949–1967)	Holycross-Ballycahill	4	All-Ireland SHC (1949, 1950, 1951, 1958, 1961, 1962, 1964, 1965); Munster SHC (1949, 1950, 1951, 1958, 1960, 1961, 1962, 1964, 1965, 1967); National Hurling League (1950, 1952, 1954, 1955, 1957, 1959, 1960, 1961, 1964, 1965); Texaco Hurler of the Year (1964); Cú Chulainn Awards (1963, 1964)
Right wing-back	Jimmy Finn	Tipperary (1950–1959)	Borris-Ileigh	5	All-Ireland SHC (1950, 1951, 1958); Munster SHC (1949, 1950, 1951, 1958); National Hurling League (1950, 1952, 1954, 1955, 1957, 1959)
Centre-back	John Keane	Waterford (1935–1951)	Mount Sion	6	All-Ireland SHC (1948); Munster SHC (1938,1948)
Left wing-back	Paddy Phelan	Kilkenny (1931–1940)	Tullaroan	7	All-Ireland SHC (1932, 1933, 1935, 1939); Leinster SHC (1931, 1932, 1933, 1935, 1936, 1937, 1939, 1940); National Hurling League (1933)
Midfield	Lory Meagher	Kilkenny (1924–1935)	Tullaroan	8	All-Ireland SHC (1932, 1933, 1935); Leinster SHC (1925, 1926, 1931, 1932, 1933, 1935); National Hurling League (1933)
Midfield	Jack Lynch	Cork (1936–1950)	Glen Rovers	9	All-Ireland SHC (1941, 1942, 1943, 1944, 1946); Munster SHC (1939, 1942, 1943, 1944, 1946, 1947); National Hurling League (1940, 1941, 1948); GAA All-Time All Star Award (1981)
Right wing-forward	Christy Ring	Cork (1940–1962)	Glen Rovers	10	All-Ireland SHC (1941, 1942, 1943, 1944, 1946, 1952, 1953, 1954); Munster SHC (1942, 1943, 1944, 1946, 1947, 1952, 1953, 1954, 1956); National Hurling League (1940, 1941, 1953); Texaco Hurler of the Year (1959)
Centre-forward	Mick Mackey	Limerick (1930–1946)	Ahane	11	All-Ireland SHC (1934, 1936, 1940); Munster SHC (1933, 1934, 1935, 1936, 1940); National Hurling League (1934, 1935, 1936, 1937, 1938); GAA All-Time All Star Award (1980)
Left wing-forward	Jim Langton	Kilkenny (1939–1950)	Éire Óg	12	All-Ireland SHC (1939, 1947); Leinster SHC (1939, 1940, 1943, 1945, 1946, 1947, 1950); GAA All-Time All Star Award (1984)
Right corner-forward	Jimmy Doyle	Tipperary (1957–1973)	Thurles Sarsfields	13	All-Ireland SHC (1958, 1961, 1962, 1964, 1965, 1971); Munster SHC (1958, 1960, 1961, 1962, 1964, 1965, 1967, 1968, 1971); National Hurling League (1957, 1959, 1960, 1961, 1964, 1965); Texaco Hurler of the Year (1965); Cú Chulainn Awards (1963, 1964, 1965)
Full-forward	Nicky Rackard	Wexford (1940–1956)	Rathnure	14	All-Ireland SHC (1955, 1956); Leinster SHC (1951, 1954, 1955, 1956); National Hurling League (1956)
Left corner-forward	Eddie Keher	Kilkenny (1959–1977)	Rower-Inistioge	15	All-Ireland SHC (1963, 1967, 1969, 1972, 1974, 1975); Leinster SHC (1963, 1964, 1966, 1967, 1969, 1971, 1972, 1974, 1975); National Hurling League (1962, 1976); Texaco Hurler of the Year (1972); Cú Chulainn Awards (1963, 1966, 1967, 1969); All-Star Awards (1971, 1972, 1973, 1974, 1975)
