= Belmont, County Offaly =

Village in County Offaly, Ireland

Belmont An Lios Dearg
- Village
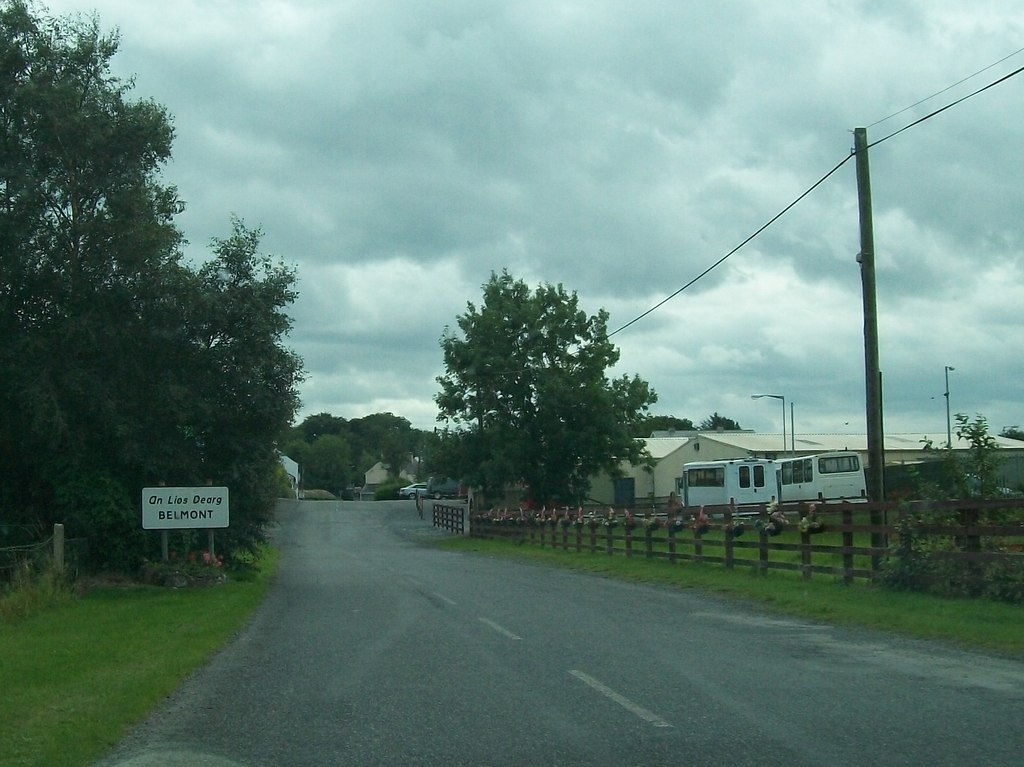
- Entering Belmont from the north

- Location in Ireland
- Coordinates: 53°15′18″N 7°53′37″W
- Country: Ireland
- Province: Leinster
- County: Offaly

Population (2016)
  - Total: 200
- Time zone: UTC+0 (WET)
  - Summer (DST): UTC-1 (IST (WEST))

Belmont (Irish: An Lios Dearg, meaning 'the red ring-fort') is a village in County Offaly, Ireland.

The village is located approximately 5 km west of Ferbane and just north of the Grand Canal. The River Brosna, just south of the village, is crossed by the mid-18th century Belmont Bridge. The nearby Belmont House (or Bellmount estate) was built in the early 19th century. Together with the nearby Belmont Mills, this estate was purchased by the Perry family in 1859, and operated as a flour and oat mill (as Robert Perry Limited) until the late 20th century. Belmont Mill now operates as an artists studio, and Belmont House and estate as a stud farm.

Belmont village itself had (as of 2016) a population of 200 people, a shop, pub and several small businesses.
