= Frank Cummins (Dublin hurler) =

Irish hurler

Personal information
- Native name: Prionsias Ó Coimin (Irish)
- Born: 1925 Littleton, County Tipperary, Ireland
- Died: 1967 (aged 41–42) Dublin, Ireland
- Occupation: Doctor

Sport
- Sport: Hurling
- Position: Left corner-forward
Club
- Years: Club
- 1943–1948: Collegians
Club titles
- Dublin titles: 2
Inter-county
- Years: County
- 1947–1948: Dublin
Inter-county titles
- Leinster titles: 1
- All-Irelands: 0
- NHL: 0

Dr. Frank Cummins (1925–1967) was an Irish hurler who played as a left corner-forward for the Dublin senior team from 1947 until 1948.

Cummins made his first appearance for the team during the 1947 championship and became a regular player for the next two seasons. During that time he won Leinster SHC winner's medal and was captain of the side that lost the All-Ireland SHC final to Waterford in 1948.

At club level Cummins played with the Collegians club in Dublin, winning back-to-back county club championship winners' medals.

Sporting positions
Preceded by	Dublin Senior Hurling Captain; 1948	Succeeded by
