= Tony Reddin =

Irish hurler (1919–2015)

Personal information
- Native name: Máirtín Cathal Ó Roideacháin (Irish)
- Nickname: Thaudy
- Born: 22 November 1919 Mullagh, County Galway, Ireland
- Died: 1 March 2015 (aged 95) Banagher, County Offaly, Ireland
- Occupation: Bord na Móna employee
- Height: 5 ft 9 in (175 cm)

Sport
- Sport: Hurling
- Position: Goalkeeper
Clubs
- Years: Club
- Mullagh; Lorrha
Club titles
- Tipperary titles: 0
Inter-county*
Years	County	Apps (scores)
1941–1947 1948–1957	Galway; Tipperary	1 (0-00); 25 (0-00)
Inter-county titles
- Munster titles: 3
- All-Irelands: 3
- NHL: 5
- *Inter County team apps and scores correct as of 01:43, 2 July 2013.

Martin Charles Reddington (22 November 1919 – 1 March 2015), better known as Tony Reddin, was an Irish hurler who played as a goalkeeper for the Galway and Tipperary senior teams.

Born in Mullagh, County Galway, Reddin first played competitive hurling at juvenile levels with his club. He arrived on the inter-county scene at the age of seventeen when he first linked up with the Galway minor team before later joining the junior team. He made his senior debut during the 1941 championship. Reddin later joined the Tipperary team during the 1947–48 league and went on to play a key part for almost a decade. During that time he won three All-Ireland medals, three Munster medals and five National Hurling League medals.

As a member of the Connacht and Munster inter-provincial teams on a number of occasions, Reddin won five Railway Cup medals. At club level, he played with Mullagh in Galway and Lorrha in Tipperary.

Throughout his career, Reddin made a combined total of 26 championship appearances. His retirement came during a tour of the United States in October 1957.

In retirement from playing Reddin became involved in team management and coaching. As the trainer of the St Rynagh's team, he guided them to two Leinster titles and ten Offaly titles.

Reddin has been repeatedly voted onto teams made up of the sport's greats, including as goalkeeper on the Hurling Team of the Century in 1984 and the Hurling Team of the Millennium in 2000.

At the time of his death in 2015 Reddin was the oldest living senior All-Ireland medal winner, a mantle he had held since the death of Tommy Cooke in 2014.

== Playing career ==
=== Club ===
Reddin began his club hurling career as a juvenile with Mullagh in 1933. It was a successful debut season as he finished the year with an East Board championship medal. Reddin was a wing forward on the same team the following year, before moving to centre-forward when he joined the Mullagh junior team in 1938.

In 1939 Reddin was first picked as a goalkeeper. The following year he made his senior championship debut and held his position as first-choice 'keeper for a number of years without success.

A move to County Tipperary at the end of the decade saw Reddin join the Lorrha. Success was immediate with the club qualifying for a north championship decider in 1948. Borrisokane provided the opposition, however, an outstanding display of goalkeeping by Reddin secured a 5–4 to 2–4 victory.

Eight years elapsed before Lorrha enjoyed success again. A narrow 0–18 to 4–8 victory gave Reddin a second north championship medal.

=== Inter-county ===
==== Beginnings ====
Reddin first played at inter-county level as a member of the Galway minor team, however, he enjoyed little success in this grade before joining the Galway junior team in 1940. He won a Connacht medal that year following a 6–5 to 1–4 defeat of Roscommon. On 25 August 1940, Reddin was between the posts as Galway faced Cork in the All-Ireland decider. A narrow 3–3 to 3–1 defeat was the result on that occasion.

After progressing onto the Galway senior team, Reddin was the second-choice goalkeeper to Seánie Duggan for much of the decade. In 1946, he played at full-forward for Galway in the Monaghan Cup against Tipperary in London and later that year was sub-goalie when the westerners lost to Cork in the All-Ireland semi-final.

As Reddin approached his thirtieth birthday, a realisation that he would never supplant Duggan from the Galway 'keeper's position, together with some impressive club championship performances led to him joining the Tipperary senior team in 1948.

==== Three-in-a-row ====
Reddin immediately became a regular member of the starting fifteen, and won his first National Hurling League medal in 1949 following a 3–5 to 3–3 defeat of Cork in the decider. On 29 May 1949 Reddin made his senior championship debut in a 3–10 apiece Munster quarter-final draw with Cork. Tipperary triumphed in the replay and later qualified for a Munster decider with Limerick following a semi-final defeat of Clare. After trailing at the interval, Tipp eventually triumphed by 1–16 to 2–10, giving Reddin his first Munster medal. On 4 September 1949, Tipperary and Laois faced off in the All-Ireland decider. In a one-sided affair, Tipp opened with a Paddy Kenny goal before Jimmy Kennedy added two more goals in the second half. At full-time Tipperary won by 3–11 to 0–3 and Reddin won his first All-Ireland medal.

Tipperary qualified for a second Munster decider in 1950, with Cork providing the opposition once again. In one of the toughest games of his career, Reddin came in for some unwanted treatment from some Cork supporters behind his goal. After a ten-minute stoppage to clear some of the 55,000 crowd who had invaded the field, Reddin's goalmouth area quickly became surrounded. Bottles, cans, sods and even an overcoat were thrown at him while he was also barracked and pushed during the closing stages. Tipperary eventually won the game by 2–17 to 3–11, however, in spite of collecting a second Munster medal, it took several hours before Reddin could leave the field due to an angry Cork crowd. He later lined out in his second successive All-Ireland final on 3 September 1950, with age-old rivals Kilkenny providing the opposition. In a dull affair, Tipp looked to be heading for victory when Seán Kenny scored a goal to put the team four points ahead with just one minute left to play. Kilkenny fought back and a Jimmy Kelly goal from the puck-out reduced the deficit to just one point again. As "the Cats" were about to launch one final attack, the referee blew the whistle and Tipperary had won by 1–9 to 1–8. Reddin had secured his second All-Ireland medal. He rounded off the year by winning a second National League medal following a 1–12 to 3–4 defeat of New York.

Tipperary's dominance of the provincial championship continued in 1951, with Reddin lining out against Cork in a third successive Munster decider. Cork's Christy Ring gave one of his best displays, however, the Tipperary full-back line of John Doyle, Tony Brennan and Mickey "the Rattler" Byrne also gave a defiant performance. A 2–11 to 2–9 victory gave Reddin a third Munster medal. The subsequent All-Ireland decider against Wexford on 2 September 1951 provided Tipperary with the chance to secure a hat-trick of championship titles for the first time in over half a century. Nicky Rackard, Wexford's goal-scoring machine, was nullified by Reddin in goal, while Séamus Bannon, Tim Ryan and Paddy Kenny scored key goals which powered Tipp to a 7–7 to 3–9 victory. It was Reddin's third All-Ireland medal.

Reddin won a third National League medal in 1952, as New York were bested on a 6–14 to 2–5 score line. The dream of a fourth successive All-Ireland triumph came to an end when Cork defeated Tipperary in the provincial decider.

==== Decline ====
Tipperary went into a period of decline following this, as Cork and Wexford had a stranglehold on the All-Ireland crown. In spite of this, Doyle added two more National League medals to his collection following defeats of Kilkenny in 1954 and Wexford in 1955.

Remembered for his wonderful anticipation, sharp reflexes and his vision, Reddin suffered from deafness and associated speech limitations throughout his career. In 1950 his ability to hear and speak improved when he got his first hearing aid during a trip to New York with the Tipperary hurlers. In 1957 he visited New York again where he got a smaller hearing aid. The hearing aids helped Reddin as a goalkeeper, however, by the mid-1950s his career was coming to a close. Shortly after winning his sixth National League title in 1957, albeit as a substitute, Reddin retired from inter-county hurling.

=== Inter-provincial ===
In 1950 Reddin was in goal as the Munster inter-provincial team faced their age-old rivals Leinster in the championship decider. A narrow 0–9 to 1–3 gave him a first Railway Cup medal. It was the first of four-in-a-row for Munster, as subsequent defeats of Leinster (1951 and 1953) and Connacht (1952) brought Reddin's winners' medal tally to four.

Five-in-a-row proved beyond Munster, however, the team bounced back in 1955. A 6–8 to 3–4 defeat of Connacht gave Reddin a fifth and final Railway Cup medal.

== Coaching career ==
After moving to Banagher, Reddin continued to work as a hurley maker while he also became involved in coaching. In 1965 he was trainer of the St Rynagh's senior hurling team that contested only their second championship decider ever. A 2–12 to 1–9 defeat of Coolderry gave St Rynagh's the title. He won thirteen championship medals, all but one of which was won on the field of play. Further success followed in 1966 as St. Rynagh's retained the Seán Robbins Cup following a defeat of Drumcullen.

Two years later in 1968, the Reddin-trained St Rynagh's team added a third championship. The 1–12 to 3–4 defeat of Coolderry was the first of three championship titles in succession for St Rynagh's, as Kinnitty were accounted for in the following two deciders. In 1970 Reddin's side collected the Leinster title following a 4–10 to 2–9 defeat of Rathnure. St Rynagh's later faced Roscrea in the inaugural All-Ireland final; however, the Offaly side were defeated by 4–5 to 2–5.

Four county championships in a row proved beyond St Rynagh's; however, the club bounced back in 1972. A defeat of Kinnitty in the county decider kick-started a run of success that yielded a record-breaking five championships in succession. As well as this, Reddin's adopted side collected a second Leinster medal in 1972 as St Rynagh's narrowly defeated old rivals Rathnure by 5–5 to 2–13.

== Recognition ==
Almost thirty years after his retirement from playing, Reddin received the ultimate honour during the GAA's centenary year in 1984 when he was chosen goalkeeper on the Hurling Team of the Century. He retained that position sixteen years later on the Hurling Team of the Millennium in 2000, while he was also named on special Munster and Tipperary all-time teams.

Following his death in 2015, Tipperary County Board chairman Michael Bourke said: "The name of Tony Reddin will go down in hurling folklore as one of hurling's legends. His achievements list high among the greats not only of his own era but also of those of modern times. However, his goalkeeping genius which inspired many is as vibrant today, not alone to Tipperary people, but all Gaels in general as we recall the greatness of his unique talent."

Brendan Cummins, one of Reddin's successors as Tipperary custodian, described him as "[the] greatest hurling goalie of all time".

== Personal life ==
Martin Charles Reddington was born in Mullagh, County Galway on 15 November 1919. His family, although having the surname Reddington, were always known as the Reddins, with Martin being referred to by his nickname of Thaudy. This nickname eventually evolved to Tony.

Reddin grew up on the family farm and was educated at the local national school. He learned his hurling skills on the family farm. When ploughing the fields he would carry a hurley and ball, striking the ball into the air and trapping it on the stick on its way down. To sharpen his reflexes he would practice against a rough stone wall from a close distance, catching the sliotar as it rebounded in different directions. Times were tough, however, in post-war Ireland. He tried in vain to make a living on a small holding of land also being farmed by his brother and the rest of their family, so at the age of twenty-eight he made the decision to leave. England was booming, however, the Mullagh man had a great love for the game of hurling and when he got the offer of a job on a farm in Lorrha in Tipperary he took it.

In 1956 Reddin married Maura Smyth from Rathcabbin and the couple had nine children; Catherine, Eamon, Jacinta, Majella, Collette, Dermot, Brenda, Noelle and Cathal. Four years later a job with Bord na Móna led to a move to Banagher where he lived for the rest of his life.

Reddin died on 1 March 2015 at the age of 95 following a short illness.

== Honours ==
=== Player ===
Mullagh

- East Board Juvenile Hurling Championship (1): 1933

Lorrha

- North Tipperary Senior Hurling Championship (2): 1948, 1956

Galway

- Connacht Junior Hurling Championship (1): 1940

Tipperary

- All-Ireland Senior Hurling Championship (3): 1949, 1950, 1951
- Munster Senior Hurling Championship (3): 1949, 1950, 1951
- National Hurling League (5): 1948–49, 1949–50, 1951–52, 1953–54, 1954–55, 1956–57 (sub)

Munster

- Railway Cup (5): 1950, 1951, 1952, 1953, 1955

=== Trainer ===
St Rynagh's

- Leinster Senior Club Hurling Championship (2): 1970, 1972
- Offaly Senior Club Hurling Championship (10): 1965, 1966, 1968, 1969, 1970, 1972, 1973, 1974, 1975, 1976,

=== Individual ===
Honours

- GAA Hurling Team of the Millennium: Goalkeeper
- GAA Hurling Team of the Century: Goalkeeper
- Munster Hurling Team of the Century: Goalkeeper
- Tipperary Team of the Century: Goalkeeper
- GAA Hall of Fame Inductee: 2013
- The 125 greatest stars of the GAA: No. 25
