= Tommy Murphy (Gaelic footballer) =

Irish Gaelic footballer

Personal information
- Native name: Tomas Ó Murchú (Irish)
- Born: County Laois, Ireland

Sport
- Sport: Gaelic football
- Position: Midfield/Forward
Club
- Years: Club
- ?: Graguecullen GAA
Club titles
- Laois titles: 8
- Leinster titles: ?
Inter-county
- Years: County
- 1937–1953: Laois
Inter-county titles
- Leinster titles: 3
- All Stars: 0

Tommy Murphy (1920–1985) was a Gaelic footballer from County Laois.

== Biography ==
Murphy was born in Graiguecullen, County Laois on 5 November 1920. He was educated in the nearby Knockbeg College in Carlow. Murphy played for the Laois Minors when he was just 15 and came to prominence in 1937 when he played his first senior championship match against Offaly. Despite being only a 16-year-old schoolboy, Murphy lined out against Kerry in the All-Ireland SFC semi-final that same year.

During the late 1930s and 1940s Murphy was a household name all over Ireland. He won Leinster provincial medals in 1937, 1938, and 1946. In all Murphy won eight Laois Senior Football Championship medals and two Railway Cup medals for Leinster. His last game for Laois was against Wexford in the 1953 Championship and two years later he played the last game for his club, Graiguecullen.

For many years Murphy worked as a land steward and later he was employed with the Department of Post and Telegraphs. He contested the 1948 general election for Laois–Offaly as a Clann na Poblachta candidate but failed to get elected.

Murphy died of a heart attack on 17 May 1985 and was buried in St Mary's Cemetery in his native Graiguecullen. He had a wife, Breda Keating, with whom he had five sons and four daughters.

== Honours ==
In recognition of his skills and long-running contribution to the sport, Murphy was awarded the 1981 All-time All Star Award as no All Stars Awards were being issued at the time of his playing career. In 1999, the GAA honoured Murphy by naming him on the Gaelic football "Team of the Millennium." He was further honoured in 2004 when the organisation named a new football competition, the Tommy Murphy Cup, in his honour.

== See also ==
- List of people on the postage stamps of Ireland
