= Sonny Maher =

Irish hurler

Martin Maher
Personal information
- Native name: Máirtín Ó Meachair (Irish)
- Nickname: Sonny
- Born: 10 November 1921 Nodstown, County Tipperary, Ireland
- Died: 11 February 1999 (aged 77) Dublin, Ireland
- Occupation: Farmer
- Height: 5 ft 11 in (180 cm)

Sport
- Sport: Hurling
- Position: Full-forward
Club
- Years: Club
- Boherlahan–Dualla
Club titles
- Tipperary titles: 1
Inter-county
- Years: County
- 1943-1952: Tipperary
Inter-county titles
- Munster titles: 3
- All-Irelands: 3
- NHL: 3

Martin Joseph Maher (10 November 1921 – 11 February 1999) was an Irish hurler. At club level he played with Boherlahan–Dualla and was also a member of the Tipperary senior hurling team.

== Career ==
Maher's hurling career began as a schoolboy when, in 1934, he was a member of the Ballytarsna team that won the initial rural juvenile title. He later joined the Boherlahan–Dualla club and won a Tipperary SHC title in 1941. Maher continued to line out at club level until 1956, by which time he had also won two Mid Tipperary SHC titles.

Maher never played in the minor or junior grades with Tipperary, but joined the senior team in 1943. After a period away from the team he was recalled and lined out at full-forward when Tipperary won three successive All-Ireland SHC titles from 1949 to 1951. Maher also won three successive Munster SHC medals and three National League titles before his inter-county career ended in 1952.

== Personal life ==
Maher was born in Nodstown, County Tipperary in November 1921. His uncle, Mikey Maher, won five All-Ireland SHC medals with Tipperary and became the first player to captain a team to three All-Ireland victories. His father, Jack Maher, also won All-Ireland honours in 1898, while his cousin, Michael Maher, played with Holycross-Ballycahill and won five All-Ireland medals with Tipperary between 1958 and 1965.

Maher died after a period of ill health at St. Vincent's Hospital in Dublin on 11 February 1999, aged 77.

== Honours ==
Boherlahan–Dualla

- Tipperary Senior Hurling Championship: 1941
- Mid Tipperary Senior Hurling Championship: 1941, 1953

Tipperary

- All-Ireland Senior Hurling Championship: 1949, 1950, 1951
- Munster Senior Hurling Championship: 1949, 1950, 1951
- National Hurling League: 1948-49, 1949-50, 1951-52
