= Seán Herbert =

Irish hurler (1923–1993)

Personal information
- Native name: Seán Hoireabard (Irish)
- Born: 1923 Ahane, County Limerick, Ireland
- Died: 1993 (aged 70) County Limerick, Ireland

Sport
- Sport: Hurling
- Position: Half-back
Club
- Years: Club
- Ahane
Club titles
- Limerick titles: 8
Inter-county
- Years: County
- 1942–1953: Limerick
Inter-county titles
- Munster titles: 0
- All-Irelands: 0
- NHL: 1

Seán Herbert (1923–1993) was an Irish sportsperson. He played hurling with his local club Ahane and with the Limerick senior inter-county team from 1942 until 1953.

== Playing career ==
=== Club ===
Herbert played his club hurling with the famous Ahane club in Limerick, and won his first senior county title in 1942 in the company of fellow player Mick Mackey. It was the first of seven county championship victories in-a-row for Herbert and his club. He won an eighth county medal in 1955.

=== Inter-county ===
Herbert's performances with his club brought him to the attention of the Limerick selectors. He made his senior debut for the team in 1942.

Two years later in 1944 Herbert lined out in his first Munster final. Cork, a team attempting to capture a fourth successive All-Ireland title, provided the opposition. The game was an exciting one with thousands of people walking to the match in Thurles as a result of war-time travel restrictions. The spectators were not disappointed, however, the game ended in a draw – Cork 4–13, Limerick 6–7. Cork however won the replay.

In 1945 Herbert played in his second Munster final. Tipperary were the opponents on that occasion, however, for the second time he ended up on the losing side. Tipp claimed the victory by 4–3 to 2–6.

The year 1946 saw Herbert play in a third provincial decider. Cork, the victors at the same stage two years earlier, provided the opposition once again. Limerick, however, had defeated All-Ireland champions Tipperary in the Munster semi-final and looked a good bet to take the title. Cork however won the game by 3–8 to 1–3.

In 1947, Herbert had his only success with the Limerick team as he captured a National Hurling League medal. Once again his side reached the Muster final as the All-Ireland champions Cork played the League champions. The game was a close affair, however, for the fourth year in-a-row Limerick were defeated.

Two years later in 1949 Herbert was back in his fifth Munster final. Once again it looked as if Limerick might claim the victory. Tipperary were the opponents on this occasion and it was that team that claimed a 1–16 to 2–10 victory. This was Herbert's last big occasion with Limerick. He continued playing with his county until 1953.

=== Provincial ===
Herbert also lined out with Munster in the inter-provincial hurling competition. He captured his first Railway Cup title in 1946 as Munster defeated Ulster. Herbert captured further Railway Cup medals in 1948, 1949, 1952 and 1953.

== Death ==
On 12 September 1993, it was announced that Herbert had died at the age of 70.
