= Tommy Ryan (Thurles Sarsfields hurler) =

Irish hurler

Personal information
- Born: Thurles, County Tipperary

Sport
- Sport: Hurling
- Position: Forward
Club
- Years: Club
- 1940s-1950s: Thurles Sarsfields
Inter-county
- Years: County
- 1940s-1950s: Tipperary
Inter-county titles
- Munster titles: 3
- All-Irelands: 3 (2 as Sub)

Tommy Ryan was an Irish sportsperson. He played hurling with his local club Thurles Sarsfields and with the Tipperary senior inter-county team in the 1940s and 1950s. He won three All Ireland Senior hurling titles with Tipperary, starting in the half forward position in the 1949 final against Laois. He was a used substitute in the 1950 final against Kilkenny, and an unused substitute in the 1951 final against Wexford.

== Honours ==
=== Tipperary ===
- All-Ireland Senior Hurling Championship:
  - Winner (3): 1949, 1950, 1951
- Munster Senior Hurling Championship:
  - Winner (3): 1949, 1950, 1951
- National Hurling League:
  - Winner (2): 1948-1949, 1949–1950
