= Des Dillon (hurler) =

Irish hurler and handballer

Personal information
- Native name: Deasún Diolún (Irish)
- Nickname: The brown doctor
- Born: 1926 Lisdoonvarna, County Clare, Ireland
- Died: 24 November 1964 (aged 38) Booterstown, County Dublin, Ireland
- Occupation: Doctor

Sport
- Sport: Hurling
- Position: Centre-forward
Clubs
- Years: Club
- Birr; UCD
Club titles
- Offaly titles: 2
Inter-county
- Years: County
- 1946–1947 1948–1951 1954–1955: Offaly; Dublin; Clare
Inter-county titles
- Munster titles: 0
- Leinster titles: 0
- All-Irelands: 0
- NHL: 0

Desmond Dillon (1926 – 24 November 1964) was an Irish hurler and handballer who played as a centre-forward for the Offaly, Dublin and Clare senior teams.

Born in Lisdoonvarna, County Clare, Dillon first played competitive hurling during his schooling at the Cistercian College, Roscrea. He arrived on the inter-county scene at the age of twenty when he first linked up with the Offaly senior team, before later lining out with the Dublin and Clare sides. He made his senior debut in the 1946 championship. Dillon went on to enjoy a sporadic career over the next decade, and won one Oireachtas medal. He was an All-Ireland runner-up as a non-playing substitute on one occasion.

Dillon represented the Combined Universities, Munster and Leinster inter-provincial teams at various times, winning one Railway Cup medal in 1955. At club level he won two championship medals with Birr before later winning a third championship medal with University College Dublin.

With University College Dublin Dillon also won four Fitzgibbon Cup medals.

His retirement came following the conclusion of the 1955 Oireachtas Championship.

Dillon also earned renown as a handballer, winning Munster medals and representing Ireland at the World Handball Championships.

== Honours ==
=== Player ===
Birr

- Offaly Senior Club Hurling Championship (2): 1944, 1946

University College Dublin

- Dublin Senior Club Hurling Championship (1): 1948
- Fitzgibbon Cup (4): 1948 (sub), 1950, 1951, 1952

Dublin

- Leinster Senior Hurling Championship (1): 1948 (sub)

Clare

- Oireachtas Cup (1): 1954

Munster

- Railway Cup (1): 1955
