= Willie McGee (Gaelic footballer) =

Irish Gaelic footballer (born 1947)

Personal information
- Native name: Liam Mag Aoidh (Irish)
- Born: 1947 (age 78–79) Burrishoole, County Mayo, Ireland
- Occupation: Retired Garda superintendent
- Height: 6 ft 1 in (185 cm)

Sport
- Sport: Gaelic football
- Position: Full-forward
Club
- Years: Club
- 1965–1985: Burrishoole
Club titles
- Mayo titles: 0
Inter-county*
Years	County	Apps (scores)
1967–1976	Mayo	17 (7–11)
Inter-county titles
- Connacht titles: 1
- All-Irelands: 0
- NFL: 1
- *Inter County team apps and scores correct as of 21:57, 14 December 2016.

William McGee (born 1947) is an Irish former Gaelic footballer. His league and championship career at senior level with the Mayo county team spanned nine seasons from 1967 to 1976.

McGee made his debut on the inter-county scene when he was selected for the Mayo minor team. A Connacht runner-up in this grade, he later won an All-Ireland medal with the Mayo under-21 team in 1967. McGee made his senior debut during the 1967–68 league. Over the course of the next nine seasons, he won one Conncaht medal and one National Football League medal. He played his last game for Mayo in March 1976.

== Honours ==
Mayo

- Connacht Senior Football Championship (1): 1969
- National Football League (1): 1969–70
