= Eddie Boyle (Gaelic footballer) =

Irish Gaelic football player

Personal information
- Native name: Éamonn Ó Baoill (Irish)
- Nickname: Prince of full-backs
- Born: 1915 Greenore, County Louth, Ireland
- Died: December 2000 (aged 85) Greenore, County Louth, Ireland
- Occupation: Breadman

Sport
- Sport: Gaelic football
- Position: Full-back
Clubs
- Years: Club
- Cooley Kickhams; Seán McDermotts (Dublin)
Club titles
- Louth titles: 2
Inter-county
- Years: County
- Louth
Inter-county titles
- Leinster titles: 2
- All-Irelands: 0
- NFL: 0

Eddie Boyle (1915 - December 2000) was an Irish Gaelic footballer who played as a full-back for the Louth senior team.

Born in Greenore, County Louth, Boyle first arrived on the inter-county scene at the age of seventeen when he first linked up with the Louth minor team before later joining the junior side. He later made his senior championship debut. Boyle enjoyed a lengthy career and won two Leinster medals.

As a member of the Leinster inter-provincial team on a number of occasions, Boyle won five Railway Cup medals. At club level he was a two-time championship medallist with Cooley Kickhams.

In retirement from playing, Boyle was chosen at full-back on a special Team of the Century made up of players who never won an All-Ireland medal.

In 1990 the Taoiseach, Charles Haughey, presented Boyle with the All-Time All Star Award at a ceremony in Dublin in recognition of his achievements.

Boyle was posthumously selected on the Louth Football Team of the Millennium in 2000.

Preceded by Jimmy Coyle	Louth Senior Football Captain; 1936	Succeeded by Jim Culligan
