= John Keane (hurler) =

Waterford hurler

Personal information
- Native name: Seán Ó Catháin (Irish)
- Born: 18 February 1917 Waterford, Ireland
- Died: 1 October 1975 (aged 58) Tarbert, County Kerry, Ireland
- Occupation: Commercial representative
- Height: 6 ft 0 in (183 cm)

Sport
- Sport: Hurling
- Position: Centre-back
Club
- Years: Club
- 1934–1955: Mount Sion
Club titles
	Football	Hurling
Waterford titles	2	8
Inter-county*
Years	County	Apps (scores)
1935–1951	Waterford	24 (7–19)
Inter-county titles
- Munster titles: 2
- All-Irelands: 1
- NHL: 0
- *Inter County team apps and scores correct as of 16:10, 17 July 2013.

John Keane (18 February 1917 – 1 October 1975) was an Irish hurler who played as a centre-back at senior level for the Waterford county team.

Born in Waterford, Keane first played competitive hurling during his school days at Mount Sion CBS. He arrived on the inter-county scene at the age of fifteen when he first linked up with the Waterford minor team, before later lining out with the junior side. He made his senior debut in the 1934–35 National Hurling League. Keane went on to play a key part for a Waterford team that made a long overdue breakthrough, and won one All-Ireland medal and two Munster medals.

As a representative of the Munster inter-provincial team for twelve years, Keane won seven Railway Cup medals during that period. At club level, he won eight championship medals with Mount Sion.

Keane's retirement came following the conclusion of the 1951 championship.

In retirement from playing, Keane became involved in team management and coaching. As trainer of the Waterford senior team in 1959, he guided them to Munster and All-Ireland victory. He was also heavily involved with training various Mount Sion teams.

Keane has been repeatedly voted onto teams made up of the sport's greats, including at centre-back on the Hurling Team of the Century in 1984 and the Hurling Team of the Millennium in 2000.

== Early life ==
John Keane was born in Waterford, on 18 February 1917, into a family that was steeped in the traditions of Gaelic Ireland. His childhood years were spent among like-minded neighbours in the city's Barrack Street. Keane was educated at Mount Sion School, a great hurling nursery and a cradle of all things Gaelic and nationalist where he became the star hurler – going on to represent the Munster colleges team for three successive years.

== Playing career ==
=== Club ===
Keane played his club hurling with the Mount Sion club in Waterford city. He won his first senior county title in 1938, the first senior title won by Mount Sion. Keane captained the club to further county titles in 1939, 1940, 1943, 1945, 1948, 1949 and 1951. On his retirement from hurling in 1951, he was the only man in his club who had played on every championship-winning team. He continued playing football for his club until 1955, winning two county senior medals.

=== Inter-county ===
Keane made his inter-county debut with Waterford in a Munster quarter-final defeat of Cork on 15 May 1932. His four-year tenure with the minor team was largely unsuccessful, apart from one Munster final appearance in 1934.

In 1934 Keane was just seventeen when he became a central figure on the Waterford junior hurling team that reached the provincial decider. A huge 7–10 to 5–2 defeat of Cork gave him a Munster medal in that grade. London provided the opposition on the subsequent All-Ireland decider. A close game developed, however, Waterford triumphed by 3–5 to 3–3, giving Keane an All-Ireland Junior Hurling Championship medal.

Keane's performances in the minor and junior grades brought him to the attention of the senior selectors. He made his senior debut in a National Hurling League game against Cork on 10 February 1935.

In 1938 Keane was a dominant force in defence as Waterford defeated Cork to reach the Munster decider. Clare provided the opposition, however, a narrow 3–5 to 2–5 victory gave Waterford their first-ever provincial crown. Keane later lined out in his first All-Ireland final on 4 September 1938, with Dublin standing in the way of a first championship. After battling hard for the hour, a more experienced Dublin secured a narrow 2–5 to 1–6 victory.

A decade in the doldrums followed Waterford's breakthrough season and, apart from a Munster final defeat in 1943, Keane enjoyed little success.

In 1948 Waterford made the breakthrough once again by reaching the provincial decider. Cork, a team aiming for a sixth All-Ireland title in nine championship seasons, provided the opposition. After falling behind by five points early in the game, Waterford fought back to lead by a point at the interval. Goalkeeper Charlie Ware made some great saves while Johnny O'Connor stymied Cork's chief scorer Christy Ring to secure a 4–7 to 3–9 victory. It was Keane's second Munster medal. The subsequent All-Ireland final on 5 September 1948 pitted Waterford against Dublin. "The Decies" started well and took a commanding 2–5 to 0–2 lead at the interval, with Keane scoring one of the Waterford goals. Dublin rallied in the second half, however, Waterford quickly regained the upper hand and powered to a 6–7 to 4–2 victory. Playing at centre-forward Keane gave a masterclass, scoring three goals and two points and made most of the other scores. The victory also gave him an All-Ireland medal.

Keane retired from inter-county hurling without any further success following Waterford's exit from the 1951 championship.

== Post-playing career ==
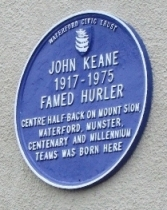
Blue Heritage plaque on the house where John Keane was born in Barrack St., Waterford

In retirement from playing Keane became heavily involved in training both club and county teams. He trained his own Mount Sion club to many county victories in the 1950s and 1960s including a record-equalling nine Waterford senior hurling titles in succession. In the eighteen years between 1948 and 1965 the Mount Sion club won fifteen county senior hurling titles and John was associated as player or coach with every success.

As the trainer of the Waterford county senior hurling team, he experienced a run of success when the county won three Munster titles, one All-Ireland, one National League and one Oireachtas title. Keane's side won the Munster title in 1957 but Waterford later lost the All-Ireland final by just one point to Kilkenny. After losing the Munster final in 1958 Keane's side bounced back in 1959 to win another Munster medal. That year the Decies faced Kilkenny in the All-Ireland final once again and, after a drawn game, Waterford overwhelmed Kilkenny in the replay to claim a second-ever All-Ireland title. In 1962 Keane guided Waterford to an Oireachtas title and the following year to National Hurling League and Munster honours. However, Waterford fell to Kilkenny in an exciting All-Ireland final.

In his final years Keane, who smoked cigarettes through most of his life, suffered from ill health. A heart condition and circulation problems reduced the mobility of one of Ireland's greatest-ever hurlers. He knew that his time on earth was limited so, shortly before his death, Keane embarked on a tour of the country to visit many of his former hurling opponents. It was a heroic journey that also proved to be his last. First, he travelled to Kilkenny to visit his great friend and opponent Jim Langton. Then back to Waterford where he spent a restless night tossing and turning with the pain. On the following day, he travelled to Kinsale where he called on Jack Barrett, an old hurling colleague from his Munster Railway Cup days. After visiting Jackie Power in Tralee Keane was travelling to Limerick when he died on the side of the road near Tarbert, County Kerry, on 1 October 1975. He was just fifty-eight years old.

The following day his remains were brought back to Waterford and Mount Sion where the thousands waited silently in the wind and the rain to say a last farewell to the man who had made them all feel so proud and on the following day he was buried in the cemetery overlooking the broad sands of Tramore.

Keane was posthumously honoured by being named on the Hurling Team of the Century in 1984 and the Hurling Team of the Millennium in 2000. He was picked for the centre-back position on both teams, marking him as the greatest number six in the history of the game.

In 2009 the Waterford City Trust erected a blue heritage plaque on the house where John was born in Barrack Street, Waterford and in 2010 a long overdue biography of John was published – THE UNCONQUERABLE KEANE: John Keane and the rise of Waterford hurling by David Smith.

== Administrative career ==
All through his life Keane was heavily involved in the administrative side of the GAA with both club and county. At various times in his career as a player with his club, he was chairman, selector, coach and captain. With the county, he filled the role of team selector, team coach and, for two years, county treasurer.

== Achievements ==
=== Mount Sion ===
- Waterford Senior Hurling Championship:
  - Winner (8): 1938, 1939, 1940, 1943, 1945, 1948, 1949, 1951
  - Runner-up (2): 1941, 1950
- Waterford Minor Hurling Championship:
  - Winner (3): 1931, 1933 1934
  - Runner-up (1):1932
- Waterford Senior Football Championship:
  - Winner (2): 1953, 1955
- Waterford Junior Football Championship:
  - Winner (1): 1939

=== Waterford ===
- All-Ireland Senior Hurling Championship:
  - Winner (1): 1948
  - Runner-up (1): 1938
- Munster Senior Hurling Championship:
  - Winner (2): 1938, 1948
  - Runner-up (1): 1943
- National Hurling League:
  - Runner-up (1): 1939
- Munster Junior Hurling Championship:
  - Winner (1): 1934
- All-Ireland Junior Hurling Championship:
  - Winner (1): 1934
- Munster Junior football championship:
  - Winner (1): 1948

=== Munster ===
- Railway Cup:
  - Winner (7): 1937, 1938, 1939, 1940, 1942, 1943, 1949
  - Runner-up (2): 1941, 1947,

== See also ==
- List of people on the postage stamps of Ireland
