= Jackie Power =

Irish hurler and Gaelic footballer

Personal information
- Native name: Seán de Paor (Irish)
- Born: 30 May 1916 Annacotty, County Limerick
- Died: 23 February 1994 (aged 77)
- Height: 5 ft 8 in (173 cm)

Sport
- Football Position: Half-forward
- Hurling Position: Half-forward
Club
- Years: Club
- Ahane
Club titles
- Limerick titles: 15
Inter-county
- Years: County
- 1935-1948 1930s-1940s: Limerick (H); Limerick (F)
Inter-county titles
	Football	Hurling
Munster Titles	-	2
All-Ireland Titles	-	2
League titles	-	4
All-Stars	-	1

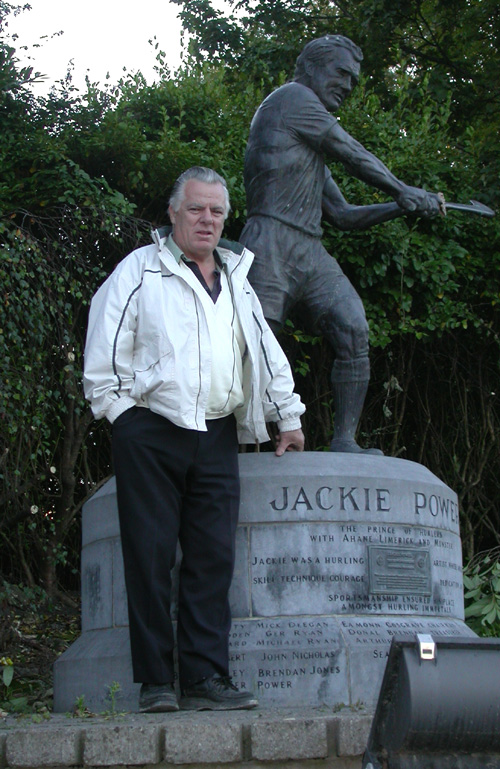
Jackie Power memorial in Annacotty

Jackie Power (30 May 1916 – 23 February 1994) was an Irish sportsperson. A renowned dual player, he played both hurling and Gaelic football with his local club Ahane and with the Limerick senior inter-county teams in both codes from 1935 until 1949. He later played with the Kerry senior hurling team.

== Early life ==
Jackie Power was born in Annacotty, County Limerick in 1916. He was educated at his local national school where he was introduced to the game of hurling by his teacher. In his teens Power showed promise at athletics, however, he decided to forfeit this interest and concentrate on Gaelic games.

== Playing career ==
=== Club ===
Power played his club hurling and football with his local club in Ahane and enjoyed much success. Ahane, spearheaded by Mick Mackey, John Mackey and Power, were the kingpins of Limerick hurling at the time. He won his first senior county title with the club as a seventeen-year-old in 1933. It was the first of seven county championship victories in-a-row for Power and his club. He won an eighth county medal in 1942, the first of another seven county victories in-a-row. Power captured his fifteenth county hurling medal with Ahane in 1955.

Power also enjoyed much success as a member of the Ahane senior football team. He won five senior county football titles in-a-row with Ahane between 1935 and 1939.

=== Inter-county ===
Power played junior and senior football with Limerick in the 1930s, however, it was at hurling that he had major success. He made his senior inter-county debut in 1935, winning a Munster Championship medal that same year. Limerick were later defeated by Kilkenny in the All-Ireland final. By 1936 Power was a regular fixture on the team. He won a second Munster title that year before claiming his first All-Ireland medal with an emphatic victory over Kilkenny. Four years later in 1940 Power won his third Munster medal which was subsequently converted into a second All-Ireland medal. 1940 was a watershed for Limerick's hurlers. It was their last Munster and All-Ireland titles for 33 years. Power continued inter-county hurling until 1949, captaining Limerick to a National Hurling League title in 1947. It was his fourth NHL medal in all, with previous victories in 1936, 1937 and 1938.

He won a Munster Junior Championship medal with Limerick in 1939.

=== Provincial ===
Power also lined out with Munster in the inter-provincial hurling competition. He collected his first Railway Cup medal in his debut year in 1940 as Munster defeated Leinster. Power later collected five inter-provincial medals in-a-row between 1942 and 1946. He won a seventh and final Railway Cup medal in 1948.

== Post-playing career ==
After retiring from playing Power's work with CIÉ, the Irish railway company, caused him to move from Limerick to Tralee. He continued, however, to maintain a keen interest in Gaelic games and became involved with the Austin Stacks club in his adopted home.

In 1969 Power's skill and talent was recognised when he was presented with the Cú Chulainn award for the outstanding hurler of the past. In the early 1970s he became involved as coach to his own native Limerick. Power first tasted success as a coach in 1971 when his team captured the National League title andboth Munster and All-Ireland victory in 1973.

Power also saw his son, Ger Power, win a record eight All-Ireland medals with Kerry’s footballers between 1975 and 1986. His daughter Sheila Power also won an ALL-Ireland medal whilst playing for the Kerry Ladies and his grandson Stephen McNamara played on the Clare All-Ireland Senior Hurling winning team in 1995.

In 1991 Power's reputation as one of the all-time greats was recognised yet again when he was the recipient of the All-Time All-Star Award.

Jackie Power died on 23 February 1994. In 1996, a life-size bronze statue of him was erected in his native Annacotty.

Awards
Preceded by John Joe Doyle (Clare)	GAA All-Time All-Star Award; 1991	Succeeded by Billy Rackard; Bobby Rackard (Wexford)
