= Seán Óg Ó Ceallacháin =

Journalist, broadcaster, Dublin hurler

Seán Óg Ó Ceallacháin

Seán Óg Ó Ceallacháin (12 May 1923 – 17 February 2013) was a journalist, broadcaster and sportsman. He played Gaelic football and hurling for the Eoghan Ruadh club and also played for the Dublin county hurling team.

== Biography ==
Ó Ceallacháin was born in Newcastlewest, County Limerick, and grew up in Fairview, County Dublin, where he attended a Gaelscoil. He twice won the Feis Ceoil competition for his singing talents in the Irish language. He married Anna McDonagh in 1954. They had three children. Finín, Caitríona, and Sinéad. He lived most of his married life in Raheny, Dublin.

He represented Dublin from 1943 to 1953 in hurling and played in the 1948 All-Ireland Senior Hurling Championship final, scoring a goal, and also played in the 1945–46 National Hurling League final.

Ó Ceallacháin had a Sunday night radio programme on Raidió Teilifís Éireann (RTÉ) entitled Gaelic Sports Results, which was the longest running continuously broadcast radio feature in the world. He took over the show in place of his father in 1953 and retired after the broadcast of 8 May 2011, fifty-eight years later. The Gaelic Sports Results programme had a worldwide audience amongst the Irish diaspora through satellite and web broadcasting. He began his media career with The Evening Press and continued until its closure in 1995. Ó Ceallacháin died on Sunday 17 February 2013 aged 89.

== Honours ==
- Leinster Senior Hurling Championship (3): 1944, 1948, 1952

== Books ==
- His Own Story, Brophy Books, 1988.
- The Birth of a Building,
- History of Hermitage Golf Club: Celebrating 100 Years (1905 to (2005),
- Tall Tales and Banter, Eason & Son
- My Greatest Sporting Memory, Calmac Publishing, 2000.
- The Dubs, Gill & Macmillan, 2006.
- Giants of Gaelic Football, Gill & Macmillan Ltd (Oct 2007)

== Plays ==
- A Scent of Hawthorn
- A Man from the Island

== Radio plays ==
- An Braon Searbh
- Aedin agus an Cailleach

== Video ==
- History of Hermitage Golf Course
