= All-Time All Star Award (hurling) =

The All-Time All Star Award in Hurling was an award given on an annual basis to a sportsperson who had made a long-running and considerable contribution to the sport of hurling in Ireland. In existence from 1980 until 1994 the award was presented to a former player who, more than likely, would have received an All Star had the awards scheme been in existence during their playing days.

== List of winners ==
Year	County	Winner	Era	Rationale
1980	Limerick	Mick Mackey	1930–1947	A two-time All-Ireland-winning captain, his honours include three All-Ireland medals, five consecutive National Hurling League medals and five Munster medals.
1981	Cork	Jack Lynch	1936–1950	Regarded as the greatest midfielder of his time, he won a record five All-Ireland medals, six Munster medals and three National League medals.
1982	Limerick; Dublin	Garrett Howard	1921–1936	One of the brilliant hurlers of his era, he had the distinction of winning All-Ireland and National League medals with two counties and Railway Cup medals with two provinces.
1983	Clare; Dublin	Pa 'Fowler' McInerney	1913–1933	In a twenty-year inter-county career that spanned three decades, he won All-Ireland medals with Clare and Dublin.
1984	Kilkenny	Jim Langton	1938–1954	One of the great Kilkenny players of his era, he won two All-Ireland medals and seven Leinster medals.
1985	Cork	Eudie Coughlan	1919–1931	
1986	Tipperary	Tommy Doyle	1937–1953	
1987	Waterford	Christy Moylan	1935–1949	
1988	Cork	Paddy 'Fox' Collins	1929–1938	
1989	Galway	M. J. 'Inky' Flaherty	1936–1953	
1990	Clare	John Joe 'Goggles' Doyle	1926–1938	
1991	Limerick	Jackie Power	1935–1948	
1992	Wexford	Billy Rackard; Bobby Rackard	1945–1964	
1993	Tipperary	Pat Stakelum	1947–1957	
1994	Kilkenny	Martin White	1931–1938	

== See also ==
- All-Time All Star Award (football)

== Sources ==
- Donegan, Des, The Complete Handbook of Gaelic Games (DBA Publications Limited, 2005).
