= Jim Devitt =

Irish hurler

Personal information
- Native name: Séamus Mac Daibhéid (Irish)
- Born: 11 October 1921 Cashel, County Tipperary, Ireland
- Died: 20 November 1988 (aged 67) Cashel, County Tipperary, Ireland
- Occupation: Soldier
- Height: 5 ft 10 in (178 cm)

Sport
- Sport: Hurling
- Position: Right corner-back
Club
- Years: Club
- 1939–1962: Cashel King Cormacs GAA
Club titles
- Tipperary titles: 0
Inter-county
- Years: County
- 1945–1950: Tipperary GAA
Inter-county titles
- Munster titles: 1
- All-Irelands: 1
- NHL: 1

James Devitt (11 October 1921 – 20 November 1988) was an Irish hurler who played as a right corner-back for the Tipperary senior team.

Devitt joined the team during the 1945 championship and was a regular member of the starting fifteen until his retirement after the 1950 championship. During that time he won one All-Ireland medal, one Munster medal and one National Hurling League medal. At club level Devitt enjoyed a lengthy career with Cashel King Cormacs GAA.
