= Paddy Ruschitzko =

American-born Irish hurler for Laois

Personal information
- Nickname: Rusty
- Born: 29 April 1917 New York City, United States
- Died: 4 March 2004 (aged 86)
- Occupation: Mill manager

Sport
- Sport: Hurling
- Position: Left wing-back
Club
- Years: Club
- 1930s–1950s: Clonad
Inter-county
- Years: County
- 1930s–1950s: Laois
Inter-county titles
- Leinster titles: 1
- All-Irelands: 0
- NHL: 0

Paddy "Rusty" Ruschitzko (29 April 1917 – 4 March 2004) was an American-born Irish sportsman who played hurling with his local club Clonad and at senior level for the Laois county team from the 1930s until the 1950s. Ruschitzko captained Laois in their last All-Ireland SHC final appearance in 1949. A contemporary of Rusty's, Rathdowney's Bill Maher hailed his team mate as 'one of the greats, a true Laois legend.'

== Early and personal life ==
Patrick Ruschitzko was brought up in Bagenalstown, County Carlow, where his mother brought the family on the death of her husband.

Ruschitzko was educated locally, however, the family later moved to Mountmellick, County Laois. It was here that his hurling skills were first noted. Ruschitzko, however, later emigrated to England for a period. On his return he joined the staff of Irish Worsted Mills in Portlaoise. He ended up as manager of the mills and remained there until the firm's closure in 1973.

He married Lillian Dunne and had three children, two girls and one boy who died at a very young age.

Paddy Ruschitzko died 4 March 2004.

== Playing career ==
=== Club ===
With his club, Clonad, Ruschitzko won over 20 major honours and was part of the three-in-a-row team that won the Laois Senior Hurling Championship in 1946, ‘47 and ‘48.

=== Inter-county ===
Having moved to live in Mountmellick, he starred on the Laois minor team which was denied All-Ireland Minor Hurling Championship glory in 1934 in the final, which Tipperary won by one point after a long period of injury time.

In 1949, Paddy was captain of the Laois team which won the Leinster Senior Hurling Championship. Playing at left half-back he marked Jimmy Langton and Laois scored a shock 4–5 to 2–7 win over a powerful Kilkenny team.

In the All-Ireland SHC semi-final, Laois defeated Galway 4–6 to 3–5, leaving Paddy to lead out his team in the All-Ireland SHC final parade opposite his old school colleague, Pat Stakelum, who was captain of the Tipperary team. Tipperary ran out easy winners but Ruschitzko's place in Gaelic Athletic Association history is secure as Laois haven't won a Leinster SHC title since.
