= Jim Prior (hurler) =

Irish hurler

Personal information
- Native name: Séamus Mac an Phríora (Irish)
- Born: 1923 Borrisoleigh, County Tipperary, Ireland
- Died: 12 November 1980 (aged 57) Grangegorman, Dublin, Ireland
- Occupation: Board of Works employee
- Height: 5 ft 10 in (178 cm)

Sport
- Sport: Hurling
- Position: Centre-back
Clubs
- Years: Club
- 1940s 1940s-1950s: Borris–Ileigh; Faughs
Club titles
- Dublin titles: 5
Inter-county
Years	County	Apps (scores)
1944-1957	Dublin	19 (12-09)
Inter-county titles
- Leinster titles: 2
- All-Irelands: 0
- NHL: 0

Jim Prior (1923 – 12 November 1980) was an Irish sportsperson. He played hurling with his local clubs Borris–Ileigh and Faughs and was a member of the Dublin senior inter-county team from 1944 until 1957.

Sporting positions
Preceded by	Dublin Senior Hurling Captain; 1952	Succeeded by
