= Harry Gray (hurler) =

Irish hurler (1915–1978)

Personal information
- Native name: Anraí Mac Cathail Riabhaigh (Irish)
- Born: 7 July 1915 Rathdowney, County Laois, Ireland
- Died: 7 September 1978 (aged 63) Rathdowney, County Laois, Ireland
- Occupation: Gresham Hotel doorman

Sport
- Sport: Hurling
- Position: Centre-forward
Clubs
- Years: Club
- Rathdowney; Faughs
Club titles
- Dublin titles: 7
Inter-county
Years	County	Apps (scores)
1936-1937 1938-1947 1948-1954	Laois; Dublin; Laois	3 apps, 0-00 (0pts); 30 apps, 4-33 (55pts); 18 apps, 13-27 (66pts)
Inter-county titles
- Leinster titles: 5
- All-Irelands: 1
- NHL: 1

Henry Gray (7 July 1915 – 7 September 1978) was an Irish hurler who played as a centre-forward for the Laois and Dublin senior team.

Gray made his first appearance for the Laois team during the 1936 championship and later joined the Dublin team. He ended his career with Laois after the 1954 championship. During that time he won one All-Ireland medal, five Leinster medals and one National Hurling League medal.

At club level Gray won numerous county club championship medals with Rathdowney in Laois and Faughs in Dublin.

The trophy for the Laois minor hurling championship is named in his honour.
