= Mullagh GAA =

Gaelic sports club in County Galway, Ireland

Mullagh
- Mullach
- Founded: 1884
- County: Galway
- Colours: Green and White

Playing kits
Standard colours

Senior Club Championships
	All Ireland	Connacht champions	Galway champions
Hurling:	-	-	3
Camogie:	1	-	5

Mullagh GAA is a Gaelic Athletic Association club based in the parish of Mullagh, County Galway, Ireland. The club is primarily concerned with the game of hurling.

== History ==
Gaelic games had been played in the Mullagh area for more than 100 years before the foundation of the Gaelic Athletic Association. A game called "hurling over the ditch" was said to have been played and is part of the old folklore of the area. A history of 'The GAA in Mullagh' was published in 1987 by historian Paul O'Donnell.

== Honours ==
- Galway Senior Club Hurling Championships (3): 1906, 1929, 1932
- Galway Senior B Hurling Championship (1): 2023
- All-Ireland Senior Club Camogie Championships (1): 1990
- Galway Senior Camogie Championships (5): 1989, 1990, 1991, 1993, 2014

== Notable players ==
- Iggy Clarke
- Joe Clarke
- Séamus Coen
- Gerry Coone
- Pete Finnerty
- Davey Glennon
- Ronan Glennon
- Derek Hardiman
- Tony Reddin
