= Jimmy Kennedy (hurler, born 1926) =

Irish hurler

Personal information
- Native name: Séamus Ó Cinnéide (Irish)
- Born: Kildangan, County Tipperary

Sport
- Sport: Hurling
- Position: Forward
Clubs
- Years: Club
- Kildangan; University College Dublin
Inter-county
Years	County	Apps (scores)
1946–1948 1949–1951	Dublin; Tipperary	6 (5-10); 14 (12-66)
Inter-county titles
- Munster titles: 2
- All-Irelands: 2
- NHL: 2

Jimmy Kennedy (1926–2007) was an Irish sportsperson. He played hurling at various times with his local clubs Kiladangan in Tipperary and UCD in Dublin. Kennedy also played with the Tipperary and Dublin senior inter-county teams from 1946 until 1951.

== Biography ==
Jimmy Kennedy was born in Kildangan, County Tipperary in 1926. He was educated at the local national school and later attended St. Flannans College in Ennis, County Clare. Here his hurling skills were fully developed and he won Harty Cup and All-Ireland colleges titles in 1944. Kennedy capped off a memorable year with membership of the victorious Munster colleges inter-provincial team.

Kennedy subsequently studied agricultural science at University College Dublin. He achieved his degree in the late 1940s and took up employment with Minch Norton Maltings in Nenagh in 1950. He moved to the firm's Goresbridge depot as manager in 1961 before transferring to the Guinness Maltings in Midleton in 1964 where he stayed for seven years.

In 1954 Kennedy married Rita McCormack. Together they had four daughters and one son. In 1971 the Kennedys took over the J.K. Moloney drapery business in Liberty Square, Thurles. Kennedy’s wife died in 1983 and on his retirement from his drapery business he came back go his native Puckane.

Jimmy Kennedy died in 2007.

== Playing career ==
=== Club ===
Kennedy played his club hurling with his local club in Kiladanagn. He won a North Tipperary junior championship medal with the club in 1944. Kennedy later played with the University College Dublin hurling club and enjoyed further successes. He won a Fitzgibbon Cup medal with the college club in the 1947-48 running of the intervarsity’s championship. He later added two Dublin county titles to his collection in 1947 and 1948. Kennedy later returned to his native Kiladangan club and continued playing until the mid-1950s.

=== Inter-county ===
It was during his time playing for UCD that Kennedy came to the attention of the Dublin senior inter-county selectors. He made his debut for ‘the Metropolitans’ in 1946 and played in his first Leinster final in 1947. Kilkenny were victorious on that occasion.

1948 saw Kennedy line out in his second provincial final. Laois provided the opposition on that occasion, however, ‘the Dubs’ trounced Laois by 5-9 to 3-3 giving Kennedy a Leinster title. Antrim fell heavily in the penultimate game of the championship, allowing Dublin to advance to an All-Ireland final meeting with Waterford. Dublin were far off the pace on that occasion and Waterford claimed the Liam MacCarthy Cup for the first time ever.

Kennedy’s performances with Dublin brought him to the attention of the selectors of his own native-county who attempted to poach him back to Tipperary. Former GAA President Seamus Gardiner, Fr. Johnnie Minehan and county secretary Phil Purcell traveled to Dublin and met Kennedy. He wasn’t intending to move as liked the Dublin hurling scene. In the end, however, he agreed and declared for Tipperary in 1949. It proved to be a shrewd decision. A short time after making his debut for Tipp Kennedy captured a National Hurling League medal. He later added a Munster title to his collection as Tipp defeated Limerick in the provincial decider. The subsequent All-Ireland final saw Tipp play Laois, the surprise winners of the Leinster final. The game turned into a rout as the Munster men completely overpowered the Leinster men. Kennedy collected his first All-Ireland medal following a 3-11 to 0-3 victory.

In 1950 Kennedy began the year by winning a second National League title with Tipp. Tipperary later took on Cork in the Munster final. The stakes were high as both sides realized that whoever won would be the favourites to take the All-Ireland title. The game itself has gone down in history as a nadir in the history of crowd-troubled matches. It is estimated that up to 50,000 people packed into FitzGerald Stadium to witness the game as gates were broken down, walls were scaled and the playing field was frequently invaded. Oranges, sods of earth and overcoats were thrown at Tipp goalkeeper Tony Reddin as he tried to do his duty. In the end Tipp won the game by 2-17 to 3-11. In the All-Ireland final Tipperary faced Kilkenny. The game failed to live up to expectations; however, Kennedy added a second All-Ireland medal to his collection following a 1-9 to 1-8 victory.

In 1951 Tipp were attempting to capture a third All-Ireland medal in-a-row. Kennedy began the campaign in the Munster quarter-final against Waterford; however, he was dropped for the semi-final against Limerick and only came on as a sub. He later played in the Munster final against Cork although he was badly hampered with cracked ribs. There was, however, no place for him on the All-Ireland final line up. Furthermore, although he had played two matches, he was the only member of the panel of twenty two to lose out on an All-Ireland medal. There were twenty one medals presented and Kennedy was the only member of the panel to lose out.

A few weeks later Kennedy was selected to play in the Oireachtas series of games, however, he declined and informed the authorities that he did not wish to be considered for inclusion any more. This brought Kennedy’s inter-county career to an end.

=== Provincial ===
Kennedy also lined out with Leinster in the inter-provincial hurling competition. He captained the team in the Railway Cup competition in 1949; however, he had little success. After moving to Tipperary Kennedy was eligible to play for Munster. He captured his sole Railway Cup winners’ medal in 1950.
