= 1938 All-Ireland Senior Hurling Championship final =

1938 All-Ireland Senior Hurling Final
- Event: 1938 All-Ireland Senior Hurling Championship
Dublin	Waterford
2–5	1–6
- Date: 4 September 1938
- Venue: Croke Park, Dublin
- Referee: Ignatius Harney (Galway)
- Attendance: 37,129

The 1938 All-Ireland Senior Hurling Championship Final was the 51st All-Ireland Final and the culmination of the 1938 All-Ireland Senior Hurling Championship, an inter-county hurling tournament for the top teams in Ireland. The match was held at Croke Park, Dublin, on 4 September 1938, between Waterford and Dublin. The Munster champions lost to their Leinster opponents on a score line of 2–5 to 1–6.

== Match details ==
1938-09-04
15:15 UTC+1

Dublin	2–5 – 1–6	Waterford

Croke Park, Dublin
Attendance: 37,129
Referee: I. Harney (Galway)
