= Mullagh, County Galway =

Parish in County Galway, Ireland

Coordinates: 53.223°N 8.395°W

Mullagh (Irish: An Mullach) is a parish in the Roman Catholic Diocese of Clonfert in County Galway, Ireland. It is in the south-east of the county, close to the towns of Loughrea, Ballinasloe, and Portumna. Mullagh lies in the civil parish of Abbeygormacan, and spans the townlands of Mullagh Beg (Irish: An Mullach Beag) and Mullagh More (An Mullach Mór).

A community centre was opened in the area in the early 1980s, and there are cemeteries in Abbeygormacan and Finnure.

Mullagh GAA, the local hurling club, competes in the Galway Senior Hurling Championship.
