= 1945 All-Ireland Senior Camogie Championship =

Camogie championship

All-Ireland Senior Camogie Championship 1945
Winners
- Champions: Antrim (1st title)
- Captain: Marie O'Gorman

Runners-up
- Runners-up: Waterford
- Captain: Bríd Nic Craith

Other
- Matches played: 2

The 1945 All-Ireland Senior Camogie Championship was the high point of the 1945 season in Camogie. The championship was won by Antrim, who defeated Waterford by a six-point margin in the final.

== Structure ==
Because of the splits in the Association and the disaffiliation of the Leinster counties only three teams entered the championship from outside Ulster. Waterford won the Munster championship for the first time when they defeated Tipperary 4–1 to 2–1 and received a bye to the All-Ireland final as Leinster had withdrawn from the Camogie Association.

== Final ==
Antrim's team travelled by five cars in wartime to Waterford for the final.

=== Final stages ===
16 September
Semi-Final

Antrim	3–1 – 1–3	Galway

Corrigan Park

17 December
Final

Antrim	5–2 – 3–2	Waterford

Cappoquin

Antrim	Waterford

ANTRIM:
GK	1	Patsy Smith
FB	2	Celia Quinn
RWB	3	Kathleen Rainey
CB	4	Marie O'Gorman (Capt) (0–1)
LWB	5	Marjorie Griffin
MF	6	Peg Dooey
MF	7	Claire McDermott
MF	8	Winnie Storey
RWF	9	Sue McKeown (1–0)
CF	10	Mavis Madden (0–1)
LWF	11	Roisin McCamphill (2–0)
FF	12	Bridie O'Neill (2–0)

WATERFORD:
GK	1	Cáit Flynn
FB	2	Maura Curran
RWB	3	Mamie O'Meara
CB	4	Nellie Breen
LWB	5	Nora Hennessy
MF	6	Kitty O'Sullivan (0–1)
MF	7	Bríd McGrath (Capt) (1–1)
MF	8	Josie McNamara
RWF	9	Teresa Hynes
CF	10	Angela Spencer
LWF	11	Nora Healy
FF	12	May Kennedy (2–0)

Match Rules

- 50 minutes
- Replay if scores level
- Maximum of 3 substitutions

== Alternative All-Ireland final ==
A complex series of disagreements, splits in the Camogie Association, the foundation of two new bodies, and other altercations between the years 1939 and 1952 had a series impact on the All-Ireland Senior Camogie Championship and led to the absence of the two most prominent camogie-playing counties Cork and Dublin among several others.

Dublin missed the All Ireland championships of 1939, 1940, 1945 and 1946, in a dispute over the ban on hockey players and was represented by a one club selection in 1941, 1947 and 1948, the CIÉ Club. As a result of a separate dispute over male officials Cork missed the eight championships between 1944 and 1952.

On the first year both were non participants they staged an "alternative" All Ireland final.

From the outset events in the Camogie Association did not follow the normal course of events in sporting disputes.

== Alternative All-Ireland final: Dublin ==
When Dublin proposed that the ban on hockey players be removed in 1939 a special delegate conference was called. Ulster Council wanted a single delegate per county at this conference, in effect enabling them to outvote Dublin, which had three quarters of the members and half the registered clubs of the association at the time.

Ulster Council then organised a boycott of the special delegate conference at which the Dublin and Kildare delegates unanimously removed the ban on hockey players. The rest of the affiliated counties seceded en masse as did the Central Council of the Camogie Association, but not, crucially the president Máire Gill or the secretary Esther Ryan. The Dublin-based Camogie Association life president Agnes O'Farrelly and the energetic national organiser Sean O'Duffy kept contact with both sides.

This left Dublin and its client clubs in Leinster as the only remaining members of the "old association" while the rest discussed a "new" National Camógaíocht Association at Jury's Hotel in Dublin on 23 July 1939. It was established soon afterwards at a meeting in Jury's Hotel on 26 August, at which Rosemary Marron of Antrim presided, with Jean Condon from Ashbourne as its president. Delegates attended from Wexford, Meath and Cork as well as the Ulster counties and letters of support were read from Galway, Louth and a few Dublin clubs that were in favour of the retention of the ban. They sought the help of the GAA to further their objectives and expected to stage their All-Ireland final at Croke Park on the first Sunday that the ground was available in November.

Dublin's strong league structure and access to playing fields in the Phoenix Park enabled it to carry on as normal without any change to practice. In the meantime the National Camógaíocht Association organised the All Ireland championships in 1939 and 1940, albeit without the O'Duffy Cup, which remained in Dublin custody. In 1941 the CIÉ Club affiliated to the Central Council and qualified for the All Ireland semi-final, setting an important precedent and putting Dublin's position of isolation under pressure.

In October 1941 Pádraig Ó Caoimh, General Secretary of the GAA mediated a settlement under which Dublin reaffiliated, Máire Gill and Esther Ryan stood down, Lil Kirby was elected new president and Jean McHugh became new secretary of the Camogie Association. The reaffiliated Dublin team met Cork in the All Ireland finals of 1942 and 1943, re-establishing their hegemony as the two leading counties in the game.

== Alternative All-Ireland final: Cork ==
Cork withdrew in 1944 over a separate issue, the debate over a females-only administration for camogie. Their eight-year withdrawal from the championship has been characterised by the game's official historian as the act of an individual, Cork chairman Idé Bean Uí Shé. Mary Moran wrote in her 2011 history of camogie, A Game of Our Own:

Readers must wonder how an individual could withdraw Cork from the Association and get away with it. I have put that question to camogie people of the time. The usual reply was 'we were unable to challenge her'. Idé Bean Uí Shé lectured in Irish at U.C.C. whereas many of the delegates that attended the Cork County Board had left school in their early teens. If someone disputed the point with her, she immediately switched to speaking Irish, leaving the delegate at a disadvantage. On the other hand, some delegates were happy to let Idé lead the way and they followed without question. The situation dragged on for years. Eventually, Old Aloysians came up with the idea of making her Life President of the Cork Board. She was delighted with the honour. A new chairperson was elected and Cork affiliated.

Cork defeated Dublin a week before Dublin won the 1944 Championship, raising questions about Dublin's claim as All Ireland champions.

== Alternative All-Ireland final: Dublin again ==
The peace in Dublin did not last either. The Leinster counties withdrew from the Association in May 1945, listing a catalogue of grievances, a time described by Mary Moran as "the darkest hour in the history of the Association".

For the first time neither of the two strongest counties in Camogie were participants in the All Ireland champions and when they met in an "alternative" or "unofficial" All Ireland final it was played at Croke Park as opposed to the "official" All Ireland championship in Cappoquin.

== Alternative All Ireland final: The matches ==
Dublin and Cork organised an alternative All Ireland final as a show of strength, showing their vastly superior playing numbers and support above that of the National Camógaíocht Association. They played at Croke Park on 14 October 1945, drawing 1–1 each. Dublin beat Cork 4–2 to 1–1 in the replay at the Mardyke on 18 November. It was a high profile event covered in the national newspapers, as opposed to the National Camógaíocht Association final in Cappoquin in which Antrim defeated Waterford with a smaller crowd and no national coverage. It is in effect Dublin's "missing" 27th All Ireland title. The winners received a set of hurleys presented by Denis Guiney, Managing Director of Clery & Co. Ltd.

Dublin	Cork

Dublin:
GK	1	Bríd Kenny (Col San Dominic)
FB	2	Rose Martin (Austin Stacks)
RWB	3	Patty Kenny (Col San Dominic)
CB	4	Rose Fletcher (Scoil Bríghde)
LWB	5	Sheila McMahon (Austin Stacks)
MF	6	Īde O'Kiely (UCD)
MF	7	Kathleen Cody (GSR)
MF	8	Kathleen Mills (GSR)
RWF	9	N Mahon
CF	10	Doreen Rogers (Austin Stacks)
LWF	11	Maura Moore (Optimists)
FF	12	Sophie Brack (GSR)

Cork:
GK	1	Peggy Hogg
FB	2	Bernie Cashman
RWB	3	Maureen Cashman
CB	4	Mary Fitzgerald (capt)
LWB	5	Mona Hobbs
MF	6	E Horgan
MF	7	R Barry
MF	8	S O'Leary
RWF	9	Maureen Hegarty
CF	10	Kathleen Barry
LWF	11	L Cronin
FF	12	Kathleen Coughlan

Match Rules

- 50 minutes
- Replay if scores level
- Maximum of 3 substitutions

== Alternative All-Ireland: aftermath ==
The National Camógaíocht Association's All Ireland Championship was saved by the rise of Antrim and the revival of interest in camogie in Belfast city, which staged high-profile All Ireland finals in 1946 and in 1947 at Corrigan Park.

Another "unified" camogie body (the third) Comhaltas Camógaíochta na hÉireann was formed in Dublin on 21 April 1947, and Leinster Council disbanded. A new Leinster Council was formed but it was only able to attract two counties to affiliate. Once again CIÉ Club affiliated to the Central Council from Dublin in 1947 and were able to qualify unopposed as Leinster champions and reach the All-Ireland final. They formed an alternative Dublin County Board on 30 September and went a step further in the 1948 championship when they won the competition without assistance from any other Dublin clubs. The success opened the way for unity talks chaired by Síghle Nic an Ultaigh from Down, who persuaded Dublin and the Leinster counties to re-affiliate in 1949. Cork re-affiliated in 1952 after an eight-year absence from the championship.

== See also ==
- All-Ireland Senior Hurling Championship
- Wikipedia List of Camogie players
- National Camogie League
- Camogie All Stars Awards
- Ashbourne Cup

Preceded by 1944 All-Ireland Senior Camogie Championship	All-Ireland Senior Camogie Championship; 1932–present	Succeeded by 1946 All-Ireland Senior Camogie Championship
