= Gaelic Senior Softball Doubles =

- Founded: 1925
- Title holders: Eoin Kennedy; Egin Jensen (?th title)
- First winner: Kilkenny
- Most titles: Kilkenny (19 titles)

The Gaelic Senior Softball Doubles title is an inter-county Gaelic Athletic Association title contested by handball players from the Island of Ireland. The competition began in 1925 with T. Behan & J. Norton of Kilkenny winning the inaugural title.

== Winning Counties ==
	Team	Number of Wins	Winning Years
1	Kilkenny	19	1925, 1929, 1939, 1940, 1941, 1954, 1965, 1980, 1981, 1985, 1987, 1988, 1989, 1990, 1991, 1993, 1995, 1996, 1997.
2	Kerry	12	1951, 1952, 1955, 1956, 1960, 1961, 1962, 1963, 1964, 1968, 1971, 1973
3	Tipperary	8	1934, 1935, 1936, 1937, 1938, 1942, 1949, 1950
	Wexford	8	1957, 1970, 1972, 1974, 1975, 1977, 1979, 1982
5	Limerick	6	1958, 1959, 1976, 1983, 1984, 1986
6	Dublin	5	1927, 1946, 1948, 2005, 2006
7	Meath	4	1967, 1992, 1994, 1998
8	Wicklow	3	1930, 1931, 1969.
9	Roscommon	2	1932, 1933.
10	Galway	1	1926.
	Clare	1	1978
	Waterford	1	1928
	Sligo	1	1947
	Cork	1	1953
	Mayo	1	1966

- Information missing for 1999, 2000, 2001, 2002, 2003, 2004.
- There was no competition between 1943 and 1945.

== See also ==
- Gaelic Senior Hardball Singles
- Gaelic Senior Softball Singles
