= Charlie McMahon (hurler) =

Irish hurler (1904–1987)

Personal information
- Native name: Cathal Mac Mathúna (Irish)
- Born: 3 August 1904 Ballina, County Mayo, Ireland
- Died: 5 December 1987 (aged 83) Phoenix Park, Dublin, Ireland
- Occupation: Quantity surveyor

Sport
- Sport: Hurling
- Position: Left corner-back
Clubs
- Years: Club
- Kevin's; O'Tooles; Young Irelands
Club titles
- Dublin titles: 2
Inter-county
- Years: County
- 1928–1941: Dublin
Inter-county titles
- Leinster titles: 4
- All-Irelands: 1
- NHL: 2

Charles Eugene McMahon (3 August 1904 – 5 December 1987) was an Irish hurler. At club level, he played with Young Irelands and at inter-county level with the Dublin senior hurling team.

== Rebel activities ==
Born in Ballina, County Mayo in August 1904, McMahon and his family later moved to Dublin. He was a member of Na Fianna Éireann and was present at the arms landing in Howth in 1914. An 11-year-old McMahon spent three days in the GPO during the 1916 Easter Rising, doing despatch and food deliveries, before being ordered home due to his age. He later joined the Irish Volunteers and took part in several ambushes during the War of Independence.

During the IRA's attack of the Custom House in May 1921, McMahon was wounded after being shot in the head. Surgeons were unable to remove the bullet and a metal plate was fitted to his skull. MacMahon later suffered epileptic fits and partial deafness from his head wound and was unable to work. Nevertheless, he joined the new National Army and saw action during the Civil War, before being medically discharged in January 1924.

== Sporting career ==
McMahon played club hurling with Kevin's and later Young Irelands, with whom he won Dublin SHC medals in 1932 and 1937. He also played Gaelic football with O'Tooles.

At inter-county level, McMahon first played hurling for Dublin as a member of the junior team in 1924, before later being a member of the senior team that won the National Hurling League title in 1929. He won his first Leinster SHC medal the following year and later lined out in Dublin's 5–06 to 3–06 defeat by Tipperary in the 1930 All-Ireland SHC final. McMahon was team captain in 1932, before winning his second Leinster SHC medal in 1934. He once again ended up on the losing side in the 1934 All-Ireland SHC final.

McMahon claimed a third Leinster SHC medal in 1938, after a replay defeat of Kilkenny in the final. He later won an All-Ireland SHC medal, after lining out at corner-back in the 2–05 to 1–06 win over Waterford in the 1938 All-Ireland SHC final. McMahon added a second National League medal to his collection in 1939, before ending his career with a defeat by Cork in the 1941 All-Ireland SHC final.

== Personal life and death ==
McMahon suffered increasing agonies from his head wound and sought medical help. The overwhelming advice was against surgery, however, the bullet was successfully removed from his skull in December 1925. He made a full recovery and resumed his work as a quantity surveyor. McMahon married Róise MacMullan in 1937 and they had six children.

McMahon died on 5 December 1987, at the age of 83.

== Honours ==
Kevin's

- Dublin Intermediate Hurling Championship: 1924

Young Irelands

- Dublin Senior Hurling Championship: 1932, 1937

Dublin

- All-Ireland Senior Hurling Championship: 1938
- Leinster Senior Hurling Championship: 1930, 1934, 1938, 1941
- National Hurling League: 1928–29, 1938–39

Leinster

- Railway Cup: 1932, 1933, 1936

Ireland

- Tailteann Games: 1932
