= 1932 All-Ireland Senior Camogie Championship =

Camogie championship

All-Ireland Senior Camogie Championship 1932
Championship details
- Dates: N/A – 30 July 1933

All-Ireland champions
- Winners: Dublin (1st win)
- Captain: Máire Gill

All-Ireland runners-up
- Runners-up: Galway
- Captain: Peg Morris

The 1932 All-Ireland Senior Camogie Championship was the high point of the 1932 season in Camogie. The championship was won by Dublin, who defeated Galway by a nine-point margin in the final for a historic first success in a new championship. The match was played alongside a senior hurling challenge between Galway and Cork at Galway Sportsgrounds on July 30, 1933.

== Structure ==
Sean O'Duffy had donated a trophy for inter-county competition but previous efforts to stage an All Ireland championship in 1911, 1917, 1923 and 1928 had not been successful. The 1932 championship, the first to be completed, was organised on an open draw basis, a format that was to be restored to camogie in 1974. Ten counties entered the championship, which were supposed to take place during the summer of 1932. The entire series was postponed until the autumn due to the Tailteann Games and the difficulties of Wexford in fielding a team, causing it to overrun to the summer of 1933. Because inter-county camogie was a new experience, county teams took the field in the colours of their county champions or a co-operative club. Cork used the gymfrocks of the UCC club.

== Trophy ==
Seán O'Duffy donated a silver cup for the All-Ireland Championship to be known from August 1933 as the O'Duffy Cup. The trophy was hand-crafted by silversmiths in Weirs of Dublin.

== Semi-finals ==
Jean Hannon scored five goals for Dublin in their 8–1 to 1–1 semi-final defeat of Wexford with the other goals coming from Maura McGuinness, Ita McNeill and Dillon Bowden. Galway beat Louth by 4–3 to 4–2 in the second semi-final, a closely fought game that did much to popularise the new championship.

== Change of Referee ==
JJ McDonnell (Meath) was appointed to referee the match but did not officiate. Stephen Jordan the Athenry-based TD, who had refereed the hurling match did so instead and became the first person to referee All-Ireland senior hurling and camogie finals.

== Final ==
Dublin held a trial match the weekend before the final in which Jean Hannon scored eight goals as the B team defeated the A team by 10–1 to 4–1. Galway held a trial match on the Tuesday before the game. Dublin travelled by train from Broadstone at 2.15 on the Saturday was met at Galway by members of the GAA and local camogie clubs. A major reception had been planned by Galway City Council for the camogie players and the Cork hurling team, which were making their first visit to Galway as All Ireland champions. The players were preceded by two bands and in a torchlit procession on the Oranmore Road to the Royal Hotel in Eyre Square where they were staying.

The elaborate preparations were all in vain. The rain was so bad on the day of the final that the event, which was anticipated to attract between 6,000 and 10,000 spectators was attended by fewer than 1,000 sodden souls, including Urban Council Members JT Costello, W Sammon, M O'Flaherty, Frank Kelly, JS Young, J Redington and JK Browne. Cork won a (shortened) hurling challenge. When the camogie match went ahead after a debate, Dublin won the toss and tore into attack. The first score in an All Ireland final was registered by Jean Hannon of Dublin. Dublin's team included four Wicklow based players, Eileen Windsor, Jean Hannon, Dillon Bowden and Queenie Dunne, members of the Bray United club, which participated in Dublin competitions at the time.

== Presentation ==
Seán O'Duffy donated a cup for the competition. As Máire Gill was both President of the Camogie Association and captain of the winning team, Seán O'Duffy presented his cup to her after the game.

== Championship Results ==
=== First round ===
| Kilkenny | 2–0 – 0–1 | Waterford |

| Wexford | 4–1 – 3–1 | Kilkenny |

| Meath | 3–0 – 2–0 | Cavan |

| Laois | 3–0 – 1–0 | Kildare |

| Meath | 2–1 – 0–0 | Wicklow |

June 11, 1933

| Louth | 8–4 – 2–1 | Meath |

Navan

=== Final stages ===
June 25, 1933
Semi-Final

| Dublin | 8–1 – 1–1 | Wexford |

Wexford Park

June 25, 1933
Semi-Final

| Galway | 4–3 – 4–2 | Louth |

Phoenix Park

July 30, 1933
Final

| Dublin | 3–2 – 0–2 | Galway |

Galway Sportsgrounds

| Dublin | Galway |

Dublin:
| GK | 1 | Bríd Kenny Dominican College Past |
| FB | 2 | Mary Walsh (UCD) |
| RWB | 3 | Essie Forde (Civil Service) |
| CB | 4 | Máire Gill (Crokes) (Capt) |
| LWB | 5 | Kathleen O'Byrne (Crokes) |
| MF | 6 | Máire O'Kelly (UCD) |
| MF | 7 | Queenie Dunne (Bray United) (2–2) |
| MF | 8 | Eileen Windsor (Crokes) |
| RWF | 9 | Maura McGuinness (Civil Service) |
| CF | 10 | Ita McNeill (UCD) |
| LWF | 11 | Dillon Bowden (Bray United) |
| FF | 12 | Jean Hannon (Bray United) (1–0) |

Galway:
| GK | 1 | Bridie Murray (Technical Institute) |
| FB | 2 | Kitty Hynes (Headford) |
| RWB | 3 | Peg Lahiffe (Kilbeacanty) |
| CB | 4 | Nora Heneghan (Tuam) |
| LWB | 5 | Una O'Riordan (UCG) |
| MF | 6 | Nora Conroy (Technical Institute) |
| MF | 7 | Peg Morris (Headford) (Capt) |
| MF | 8 | Dell Kearney (Currandrum) |
| RWF | 9 | Sheila Belton (Tech Inst) |
| CF | 10 | Bríd O'Beirne (UCG) (0–1) |
| LWF | 11 | Kathleen Walsh (Tuam) (0–1) |
| FF | 12 | Rita Cosgrave (UCG) |

Match Rules

- 40 minutes
- Replay if scores level
- No substitutions except in case of injury

== See also ==
- All-Ireland Senior Hurling Championship
- Wikipedia List of Camogie players
- National Camogie League
- Camogie All Stars Awards
- Ashbourne Cup

| Preceded by None | All-Ireland Senior Camogie Championship; 1932–present | Succeeded by 1933 All-Ireland Senior Camogie Championship |
