= 1947 All-Ireland Senior Camogie Championship =

Camogie championship

All-Ireland Senior Camogie Championship 1947
Winners
- Champions: Antrim (3rd title)
- Manager: Charlie McMahon
- Captain: Celia Quinn

Runners-up
- Runners-up: Dublin
- Captain: Sophie Brack

The 1947 All-Ireland Senior Camogie Championship was the high point of the 1947 season in Camogie. The championship was won by Antrim, who defeated Dublin by a three-point margin in the final. The semi-final between Dublin and Galway ranks alongside the disputed semi-final of 1966 between Dublin and Tipperary as the most controversial in camogie history.

== Structure ==
With the resumption of a second round of hostilities between Dublin County Board and the Central Council of the Camogie Association in 1944, only the (CIÉ club) remained affiliated in Dublin. The county was represented by one club selection in the championship, albeit one that included three of the leading exponents of the game of that era or the entire history of the 12-a-side game, Kathleen Cody, Kathleen Mills and Sophie Brack. Galway beat Mayo in the Connacht final. Tipperary won the Munster championship for the first time in the absence of Cork.

== Semi-finals ==
Eileen Walsh (Tipperary) and Bridie O'Neill (Antrim) scored three goals each as Antrim defeated Tipperary in the All Ireland semi-final. The Irish Independent reported that the other semi-final between Dublin and Galway at Ballinasloe, ended with hundreds of spectators rushing onto the field "to voice their displeasure at the referee", Barney McDonnell from Wicklow, who had stood in for Michael Hennessy of Clare. Gardaí restored order and escorted the referee away by car. Galway led by 2–1 to 0–1 at the interval until goals from Kathleen Cody and Kathleen Mills gave Dublin victory by 2–3 to 2–1. Galway were pushing for an equaliser when the final whistle was blown. A letter-writer to the Connacht Tribune proposed that in future only lady referees should be appointed to camogie matches in future.

== Final ==
Antrim had got off to a great start in the final and had 1–1 on the scoreboard within five minutes. Kathleen Cody shot for goal towards the end of the final, the ball sank in the sea of mud that filled the goal area. Antrim goalkeeper Kathleen Madden retrieved the ball and cleared it. Dublin appeals that the ball had crossed the line were not entertained and Antrim retained their title.

=== Final stages ===
October 5
Semi-Final

Antrim	5–2 – 4–1	Tipperary

Corrigan Park

October 12
Semi-Final

Dublin	2–3 – 2–1	Galway

Ballinasloe

October 5
Semi-Final

Antrim	5–2 – 4–1	Tipperary

Corrigan Park

November 9
Final

Antrim	2–4 – 2–1	Dublin

Corrigan Park

Antrim	Dublin

Antrim:
GK	1	Kathleen Madden
FB	2	Celia Quinn (Capt)
RWB	3	Nancy Mulligan
CB	4	Kathleen Dooey
LWB	5	Marjorie Griffin
MF	6	Kathleen Rainey
MF	7	Mavis Madden (0–4)
MF	8	Mary McGarry
RWF	9	Mary Keenan
CF	10	Rita McGarry
LWF	11	Sue McKeown
FF	12	Bridie O'Neill (2–0)

Dublin:
GK	1	Rita Manifold (CIÉ)
FB	2	Teresa O'Donoghue (CIÉ)
RWB	3	Catherine Bowler (CIÉ)
CB	4	May Fitzpatrick (CIÉ)
LWB	5	Caramel Nulty (CIÉ)
MF	6	Thelma Tighe (CIÉ)
MF	7	Kathleen Cody (CIÉ)
MF	8	Kathleen Mills (CIÉ)
RWF	9	Brenda Neville (CIÉ)
CF	10	Joan Cosgrove (CIÉ) (1–0)
LWF	11	May Neville (CIÉ)
FF	12	Sophie Brack (CIÉ) (1–1)

Match Rules

- 50 minutes
- Replay if scores level
- Maximum of 3 substitutions

== See also ==
- All-Ireland Senior Hurling Championship
- Wikipedia List of Camogie players
- National Camogie League
- Camogie All Stars Awards
- Ashbourne Cup

Preceded by 1946 All-Ireland Senior Camogie Championship	All-Ireland Senior Camogie Championship; 1932–present	Succeeded by 1948 All-Ireland Senior Camogie Championship
