= James Andrew Walsh =

Irish hurler

Photographic proof for Sporting Heroes cigarette card

James Andrew Walsh (20 November 1908 – 16 May 1985) was an Irish hurler.

== Early life ==
He was born in Waterford, Ireland, the son of James Walsh of New Ross, Co. Wexford, and Ellen Stafford of Carrick-on-Bannow, Co. Wexford. He attended Mount Sion school in Waterford City, the first school founded and run by the Congregation of Christian Brothers. The Irish Christian Brothers were staunch champions of Irish nationalism, the Irish Language Revival and Irish sports. Mount Sion established a tradition of hurling, which attracted Jimmy as a youth.

The founder of Mount Sion, Edmund Ignatius Rice, undertook to develop ‘the whole student’, adopting the ancient Greek concept of arete. When Walsh sat the exams for the Leaving Certificate, he achieved the nation's highest score for mathematics.

In the archives of the Leinster GAA (Gaelic Athletic Association), James is referred to as Jim Walsh (Civil Service). This was done to avoid confusing him with other hurlers of the same name, but it also signifies that Walsh was among Ireland's first generation of civil servants. Fluent in the Irish language, he passed the Civil Service Entrance Examination for Executive Officers, ranking 12th out of the 250 candidates in 1926. His entry into the Civil Service meant moving from Waterford to Dublin. He first worked in the Department of Education, was seconded briefly to the Department of Finance, and eventually settled in the Department of Defence.

== Hurling Highlights ==
Walsh played half-back (see Gaelic football, hurling and camogie positions) for Dublin and Leinster. He was on the team that won the 1932 Railway Cup Hurling Championship and the 1933 Railway Cup Hurling Championship. He also played in the Leinster SHC of 1932 and 1933. His team won the Leinster SHC in 1934, and played Limerick in the 1934 All-Ireland Senior Hurling Championship at Croke Park, Dublin. Leinster lost after a hard-fought replay in the game that marked the Golden Anniversary of the Gaelic Athletic Association. Walsh won medals and appeared on a National Sporting Heroes cigarette card published about 1934-5 by W.D. & H.O. Wills.

=== News coverage ===
==== Walsh the Pick of the Dublin Bunch ====
"Jimmy Walsh, the Civil Service representative, was the pick of the Dublin team. He struck back a great number of balls throughout the whole hour. He was always in the picture and completely eclipsed Martin Power. He certainly gave a very nice display."

==== Who's Who ====
"Jimmie Walsh (Civil Service) -- Right half back. Native of Waterford. Played for his native County and for the Dublin Juniors, and for Dublin seniors in last year's National League Final for the first time as a back. Doubtful if there is a better half-back playing. Excellent in both matches against Kilkenny."

==== Walsh as Good as Previously ====
"Last week I expressed the view that Jimmy Walsh at right half-back was the pick of the bunch. The same can be said without any doubt on this occasion. The Civil Service man was everywhere at the right time; got rid of the ball in the proper manner, followed up to anticipate a possible return. And when the returns came he got them safe and sound. If anything he was too strong during the first half, but who then could expect a defence man to cut his stroke? He is a topping hurler without question."

==== Half-backs Good ====
"Jimmy Walsh and Caniffe were the best of the challengers."

==== Thrilling Hurling Battle Ends in Draw ====
"The encounter between Dublin and Limerick was truly an epic. On the whole, it must be said that Limerick had the best of the play, and the fact that Dublin compelled a draw was due to the close tackling of its players, to the cool, cleverness of Walsh, and the magnificent savings of Forde, the goalie...Dublin positions were rearranged. Jimmy Walsh moved into midfield, and this move largely determined the result of the match."

==== Great Opposition ====
(An interview with Mick Mackey, arguably Ireland's greatest hurler)
"When I again turned Mick's thoughts to the 1934 All-Ireland, he commented that Dublin had a wonderful half-back line...Jimmy Walsh, a Waterford man, was also great for Dublin; he did some terrible (i.e. formidably great) hurling for his side on the day of the replay."

James Walsh on Wills's Cigarette card, circa 1934.

Verso of cigarette card.

== Personal life ==
While at the Department of Education, Walsh met Nora Fitzpatrick of Kinsale, Co. Cork. She had travelled to Dublin to embark on a Civil Service career. They married, and had four children: Margaret, Patricia, John Finbarr (Barry) and Elizabeth.

== See also ==
- Civil Service Hurling Club
