= 1932 All-Ireland Senior Camogie Championship final =

1932 All-Ireland Senior Camogie Final
- Event: All-Ireland Senior Camogie Championship 1932
| Dublin | Galway |
| 3-2 | 0-2 |
- Date: 30 July 1933
- Venue: Galway Sportsgrounds, Galway
- Referee: Stephen Jordan (Galway)
- Attendance: 4,000

The 1932 All-Ireland Senior Camogie Championship Final was the 1st All-Ireland Final and the deciding match of the 1932 All-Ireland Senior Camogie Championship, an inter-county camogie tournament for the top teams in Ireland.

Dublin won the first All-Ireland, captained by Maura Gill.
