= Ducksy Walsh =

Irish handball player

Ducksie Walsh (born Michael Walsh; 3 May 1966 – 4 August 2016) was an Irish handball player for Kilkenny. He contested the 2007 M Donnelly 60 x 30 Singles Handball final against Eoin Kennedy of Dublin.

Michael won all of the Senior Softball Singles titles between 1985 and 1997. He won again in 1999, 2000 and 2001. He won ten All Ireland Softball Doubles with fellow Kilkennyman Eugene Downey.

Even up until his death he was still competing at the highest level of 60x30 Handball. The week before his death he won the senior Irish Nationals, settling the score with Eoin Kennedy, Dublin. And in 2015 he reached the Senior Doubles 60x30 All Ireland final with Ciaran Neary. Here he lost out in the tie break and followed this up weeks later by winning the All Ireland Masters 60x30 Singles title.

== Honours ==
- 16 All-Ireland 60x30 Senior Singles titles
- 7 All-Ireland 40x20 Senior Singles titles
- 10 All-Ireland 60x30 Senior Doubles titles
- 5 All-Ireland 40x20 Senior Doubles Titles
- 1 Waterford National Crystal Singles
- 7 Handballer of the Year awards
- Numerous underage All-Ireland, USA and world titles, etc.
- Holds record thirteen successive Senior Softball Singles titles 1985–1997.
- Holds record thirty-eight All-Ireland Senior medals.
- 10 All Ireland Masters 40x20 Singles
- 2 World Championships in 2015 — Masters 40x20 Singles
- Masters One Wall Singles

== Death ==
Walsh died on 4 August 2016, aged 50, after a short illness.
