= 1946 All-Ireland Senior Camogie Championship =

Camogie championship

All-Ireland Senior Camogie Championship 1946
Winners
- Champions: Antrim (2nd title)
- Captain: Marjorie Griffin

Runners-up
- Runners-up: Galway
- Captain: Monica Duggan

Other
- Matches played: 2

The 1946 All-Ireland Senior Camogie Championship was the high point of the 1946 season in Camogie. The championship was won by Antrim, who defeated Galway by a four-point margin in the final.

== Structure ==
With Leinster and Cork unaffiliated, there were just four entrants for the championship. Tipperary beat Kerry 3–4 to nil in Cahir. Clare beat Tipperary 2–2 to 1–1 in Nenagh and had a bye from unaffiliated Cork in the final to win the Munster championship. Galway beat Mayo 5–0 to 2–1 in the Connacht final at Coyne's field in Westport.

Clare then took and lost a six-point lead against Galway in the All Ireland semi-final with goals from Mary Mulcahy and Nora Donnelly, then led again through another two goals from Sadlier and O'Donnell before goals from Kitty Greally and Josie Melvin and a point from Rita Clinton gave Galway victory. Dublin beat Wicklow in the final of an alternative Leinster championship.

== Final ==
Gate receipts at the final at Corrigan Park were £250.

=== Final stages ===
Semi-Final

Galway	5–2 – 4–0	Clare

Nenagh

September 29
Final

Antrim	4–1 – 2–3	Galway

Corrigan Park

Antrim	Galway

Antrim:
GK	1	Mary Ann Donnelly (Ballycastle)
FB	2	Celia Quinn
RWB	3	Kathleen Rainey (Dunloy)
CB	4	Kathleen Dooey (Dunloy)
LWB	5	Marjorie Griffin (Capt)
MF	6	Nancy Mulligan (Deirdre)
MF	7	Patsy Smith (Gael Uladh)
MF	8	Ita O'Reilly
RWF	9	Mavis Madden (Gael Uladh) (1–0)
CF	10	Winnie Storey (1–0)
LWF	11	Sue McKeown (2–0)
FF	12	Eithne Henry (Loughgiel) (0–1)

Galway:
GK	1	Kathleen McGinn (UCG)
FB	2	Catherine Griffin (Galway City)
RWB	3	Monica Duggan (Galway City) (Capt)
CB	4	Philomena Noone (Caltra)
LWB	5	Ann Glynn (Fohenagh)
MF	6	Mary Lohan (Tuam)
MF	7	Annie McDermott (Caltra) (0–2)
MF	8	Rita Clinton (Fohenagh) (0–1)
RWF	9	Kitty Greally (Maree)
CF	10	KP Greally (Maree)
LWF	11	Josie Melvin (Galway City)
FF	12	Celia Mulholland (Galway City) (2–0)

Match Rules

- 50 minutes
- Replay if scores level
- Maximum of 3 substitutions

== See also ==
- All-Ireland Senior Hurling Championship
- Wikipedia List of Camogie players
- National Camogie League
- Camogie All Stars Awards
- Ashbourne Cup

Preceded by 1945 All-Ireland Senior Camogie Championship	All-Ireland Senior Camogie Championship; 1932–present	Succeeded by 1947 All-Ireland Senior Camogie Championship
