= 1948 All-Ireland Senior Camogie Championship =

Camogie championship

All-Ireland Senior Camogie Championship 1948
Winners
- Champions: Dublin (8th title)
- Captain: Sophie Brack

Runners-up
- Runners-up: Down
- Captain: Peg Dooey

The 1948 All-Ireland Senior Camogie Championship was the high point of the 1948 season in Camogie. The championship was won by Dublin, who defeated Down by a 23-point margin in the final. It marked the return of Dublin to the roll of honour after an eight-year hiatus when it was separated from the rest of the camogie playing community, as the CIÉ club, which could call on the two greatest players of the era Kathleen Cody and Kathleen Mills, chose to affiliate to Central Council and their one-club selection won the All-Ireland championship.

== Structure ==
Reigning champions Antrim were favourites to meet Dublin in the All Ireland final. Instead Down shocked Derry 4–5 to 1–0 at Kilclief.

== Final ==
The All-Ireland final between Dublin and Down was played on a Saturday for the first time.

=== Final stages ===
October 3
Semi-Final

Down	1–4 – 1–1	Galway

Roscrea

October 10
Semi-Final

Dublin	1–5 – 1–1	Tipperary

Roscrea

October 23
Home Final

Dublin	11–4 – 4–2	Down

Croke Park

October 23
Final Proper

Dublin	9–3 – 2–2	London

Croke Park

Dublin	Down

Dublin:
GK	1	Rita Manifold (CIÉ)
FB	2	Mamie O'Meara (CIÉ)
RWB	3	Catherine Bowler (CIÉ)
CB	4	May Fitzpatrick (CIÉ)
LWB	5	Carmel Nulty (CIÉ)
MF	6	Jean Hannon (CIÉ) (0–1)
MF	7	Kathleen Cody (CIÉ) (3–1)
MF	8	Kathleen Mills (CIÉ) (0–1)
RWF	9	Brenda Neville (CIÉ) (2–0)
CF	10	Joan Cosgrave (CIÉ) (3–0)
LWF	11	May Neville (CIÉ)
FF	12	Sophie Brack (CIÉ) (3–1)

Down:
GK	1	Bernie Kelly
FB	2	Anna Kerr
RWB	3	Rosaleen Denvir
CB	4	Peg Dooey (2–2)
LWB	5	Kathleen Mallon
MF	6	Jean McGrath
MF	7	Sheila Keary (1–0)
MF	8	Anna Hollywood
RWF	9	Una Kelly
CF	10	Mary Fay (1–0)
LWF	11	Betty Curran
FF	12	Angela Denvir

Match Rules

- 50 minutes
- Replay if scores level
- Maximum of 3 substitutions

== See also ==
- All-Ireland Senior Hurling Championship
- Wikipedia List of Camogie players
- National Camogie League
- Camogie All Stars Awards
- Ashbourne Cup

Preceded by 1947 All-Ireland Senior Camogie Championship	All-Ireland Senior Camogie Championship; 1932–present	Succeeded by 1949 All-Ireland Senior Camogie Championship
