= 1933 Railway Cup Hurling Championship =

Irish hurling competition

- Dates: 19 February 1933 – 17 March 1933
- Teams: 3
- Champions: Leinster (3rd title); Eddie Doyle (captain)
- Runners-up: Munster; John Joe Doyle (captain)

Tournament statistics
- Matches played: 2
- Goals scored: 14 (7 per match)
- Points scored: 24 (12 per match)
- Top scorer(s): Martin Kennedy (5-01)

The 1933 Railway Cup Hurling Championship was the seventh series of the inter-provincial hurling Railway Cup. Two matches were played between 19 February and 17 March 1933. It was contested by Connacht, Leinster and Munster.

Leinster entered the championship as the defending champions.

On 17 March 1933, Leinster won the Railway Cup after a 4-06 to 3-06 defeat of Munster in the final at Croke Park, Dublin. This was their second title in succession and their third title over all.

Munster's Martin Kennedy was the Railway Cup top scorer with 5-01.

== Results ==
=== Semi-final ===
19 February 1933 Semi-final	Connacht	3–07 – 4–05	Munster	Portumna Sportsfield, Portumna
	Ryan 1-1, Deely 1-0, Donohue 1-0, M King 0-3, Grififn 0-1, McInerney 0-1, Morgan 0-1.		M Kennedy 2-0, T Considine 1-2, G Garrett 1-1, T Treacy 0-2.

=== Final ===
17 March 1933 Final	Leinster	4–06 – 3–06	Munster	Croke Park, Dublin
	J Dunne 2-0, D O'Neill 1-1, J Walsh 1-1, L Meagher 0-3, E Byrne 0-1.		M Kennedy 3-1, J Houlihan 0-3, W Clancy 0-1, T Ryan 0-1.	Referee: S Jordan (Galway)

== Top scorers ==
Top scorers overall

Rank	Player	County	Tally	Total	Matches	Average
1	Martin Kennedy	Munster	5-01	16	2	8.00
2	Johnny Dunne	Leinster	2-00	6	1	6.00
3	Tull Considine	Munster	1-02	5	1	5.00

== Sources ==
- Donegan, Des, The Complete Handbook of Gaelic Games (DBA Publications Limited, 2005).
