= Kathleen Mills =

Dublin Camogie player

Personal information
- Born: October 8, 1923 Dublin, Ireland
- Died: August 11, 1996 (aged 72)

Sport
- Sport: Camogie
- Position: Left wing
Club
- Years: Club
- GSR/CIE GAA
Inter-county titles
- Leinster titles: 18
- All-Irelands: 15

Kathleen "Kay" Mills-Hill (8 October 1923 – 11 August 1996) was an Irish sportsperson who played senior camogie with Dublin from 1941 until 1961. She is regarded as one of the greatest players of all-time, winning 15 All Ireland Senior Medals.

== Early life and family ==
Katherine Rosaleen Mills was born in 31 South Square, Inchicore, Dublin, on 8 October 1923. Her mother, Winifred (née Wills), was from Inchicore and her father, Thomas, was from Glanmire, County Cork. Her father worked for Great Southern Railways. She had three siblings, Gertrude, Ada and Robert. When she was just eighteen months old her mother died, leaving her to be raised by her maternal grandmother, Charlotte Wills, who lived 1 Abercorn Terrace, Inchicore. She was educated in the local convent school at Goldenbridge, where she played table tennis and soccer as well as doing gymnastics. However, camogie was her first love, which she started playing at age 5. She left school at a young age, and went to work in Lamb's jam factory.

Through her father, Mills was able to participate in and avail of the sporting activities in the GSR Athletic Union. Two pence per week were deducted from the worker’s wages to go towards the financing of the sports activities in the Railway. In 1947, Mills married George Hill. They ran the Red Seal Handbag Company from the North Circular Road, and later Hill Street. Later they became vintners, running the Seventh Lock public house on the Grand Canal, Ballyfermot.

== Playing career ==
Mills made her camogie debut with the Great Southern Railways club in Dublin in 1938 at the age of 14, and was promoted to the senior team for her second match. Three years later in 1941 she made her debut for Dublin while still 16 and played in Dublin's unsuccessful All-Ireland final against Cork, winning her first All-Ireland medal after a replay against Cork a year later.

In 1943 the same counties met in the All-Ireland final for the third year in-a-row. Once again Mills ended up claiming an All-Ireland medal, her goal from fifty yards range being described as the highlight of the match. The following year, 1944, brought a third All-Ireland medal. In 1945 and 1946 a dispute in the camogie association kept Dublin out of the All-Ireland championship in spite of being Leinster champions in both years. In 1948 Dublin were back on form and Mills captured a fourth All-Ireland medal. She took no part in the 1949 championship, however, the 1950s would bring much success to Mills.

From 1950 to 1955, Mills captured six All-Ireland titles in-a-row. In 1956 "the Dubs" surrendered their crown to Anrtim but it was soon reclaimed in 1957. In 1958 Mills was appointed captain of the Dublin camogie team. Led by her, Dublin defeated Tipperary to capture yet another All-Ireland title. She captured three more All-Ireland medals in 1959, 1960 and 1961. The occasion of the 1961 final was special as it was Mills' 38th birthday and her last outing in a Dublin jersey.

== Retirement ==
In her playing days Mills was regarded as one of the all-time greats. She is regarded as camogie’s first superstar she has often been described as the Christy Ring, Mick Mackey, Nicky Rackard and Lory Meagher of the camogie world. With a haul of 15 senior All-Ireland medals, Mills was the most decorated player in the history of Gaelic games at the time of her retirement. Since then Rena Buckley and Briege Corkery have won more than Mills.

== Death and legacy ==
Kathleen Mills-Hill died on 11 August 1996 from undisclosed causes, at her home on the Naas Road, Dublin. She was buried in Palmerstown cemetery. In 2010 the camogie trophy for the annual inter-county All Ireland Championship for counties graded Junior was named in her honour. The Kay Mills Cup is a replica of the O'Duffy Cup. A plaque to Mills was erected at her former home, 1 Abercorn Terrace, Inchicore.

== Honours ==
=== Camogie ===
Dublin

- All-Ireland Senior Camogie Championship
  - Winners: (15) 1942, 1943, 1944, 1948, 1950, 1951, 1952, 1953, 1954, 1955, 1957, 1958 (c), 1959, 1960, 1961
  - Runners-Up: (2) 1941, 1947
- Leinster Senior Camogie Championship
  - Winners: (20) 1941, 1942, 1943, 1944, 1945, 1946, 1947, 1948, 1950, 1951, 1952, 1953, 1954, 1955, 1956, 1957, 1958, 1959, 1960, 1961

Preceded by Eileen Duffy (Dublin)	All-Ireland Camogie Final winning captain 1958	Succeeded by Bríd Reid (Dublin)
