= Eileen Duffy =

Personal information
- Native name: Éibhlín Ní Dhubhthaigh (Irish)
- Born: Dublin, Ireland

Sport
- Sport: Camogie
Club
- Years: Club
- Celtic
Club titles
- titles: 5
Inter-county
- Years: County
- Dublin
Inter-county titles
- All-Irelands: 8

Eileen Duffy-O'Mahoney was an Irish sportsperson who played senior camogie with Dublin from 1949 until 1957.

== Background ==
Eileen Duffy was born in Dublin. She showed great skill at the game of camogie in her youth and quickly joined her local Celtic camogie club. It was with this club that Duffy first tasted success, and she later won five Dublin county camogie titles. She quickly came to the attention of the Dublin senior camogie selectors and made her senior inter-county debut in 1949.

== Career ==
It was a golden era for Dublin camogie, and Duffy won seven All-Ireland medals in-a-row, beginning in her debut year. Her skills were particularly noted in 1951 as she was named as Sports Star of the Year, an honour she won again in 1957. Three years later in 1954 Duffy was the Leinster goalkeeper when the first inter-provincial game was played in Navan to mark the Golden Jubilee of Cumann Camogaíochta na nGael in 1954. In 1956 Antrim brought an end to Dublin's camogie dominance, however, "the Dubs" returned in 1957 with Duffy as captain. It was another successful year as she captured her eighth and final All-Ireland medal.

== Citation ==
In 2004, Duffy was honoured by being named as the goalkeeper of the Camogie Team of the Century. Her citation read: "quick to react between the posts, sure and confident, she had a great understanding with her backs, her lengthy clearance and long puck out were other features of her game."

== Family ==
She retired from camogie after she got married because "it was not considered ladylike; to continue playing. Her daughters Niamh, Sheila and Gráinne played for Celtic and Gráinne played for Dublin.

Preceded by Madge Rainey (Antrim)	All-Ireland Camogie Final winning captain 1957	Succeeded by Kathleen Mills (Dublin)
