= Pat Raftery (camogie) =

Personal information
- Native name: Pádraigín Ní Reachtaire (Irish)
- Born: Dublin, Ireland

Sport
- Sport: Camogie
- Position: half forward
Club*
Years	Club	Apps (scores)
	Coláiste San Dominic	?
Inter-county**
Years	County	Apps (scores)
	Dublin	?
- * club appearances and scores correct as of (16:31, 30 June 2010 (UTC)). **Inter County team apps and scores correct as of (16:31, 30 June 2010 (UTC)).

Patricia ‘Pat’ Raftery is a former camogie player, captain of the All Ireland Camogie Championship winning team in 1950. She won a previous All Ireland senior medal in 1949.

== Career ==
With Coláiste San Dominic she featured on the 10946 team which won a surprise Dublin senior championship.
