= Martin Kennedy (hurler) =

Irish hurler

Personal information
- Native name: Máirtín Ó Cinnéide (Irish)
- Born: 20 November 1898 Toomevara, County Tipperary, Ireland
- Died: 17 July 1983 (aged 84) Nenagh, County Tipperary, Ireland

Sport
- Sport: Hurling
- Position: Forward
Club
- Years: Club
- Toomevara
Inter-county
- Years: County
- 1922-1936: Tipperary
Inter-county titles
- Munster titles: 4
- All-Irelands: 2
- NHL: 1

Martin Kennedy (20 November 1898 – 17 July 1983) was an Irish sportsperson. He played hurling with his local club Toomevara and with the Tipperary senior inter-county team from 1922 until 1936. Kennedy is regarded as one of Tipperary's greatest-ever players.

== Playing career ==
=== Club ===
Kennedy first played club hurling as a goalkeeper with the Borrisoleigh club. He had been born in that portion of the parish and contested two county intermediate finals before transferring his allegiance to the Toomevara club in 1919. It was only when the regular full-forward on that team got injured that Kennedy was used in this position and he went on to enjoy much success. He won his first senior county title in 1919 and added further county medals in 1923, 1930 and 1931. Kennedy continued to play until well into his forties and joined the Kildangan club after marrying and settling there. He later played at full-forward with an LDF selection in Limerick during the Emergency.

=== Inter-county ===
Kennedy made his debut with the Tipperary senior inter-county team in the championship of 1922. In his very first game, played against Cork in Cork, he lined out at full-forward against Seán Óg Murphy and scored four goals. Kennedy's side won the game; however, it would be 2008 before Tipp defeated Cork at home again. The subsequent Munster final saw Tipperary draw with Limerick. The replay gave Tipp a comprehensive victory and gave Kennedy his first Munster title. The All-Ireland final pitted Tipp against Kilkenny for the first time in almost a decade. With three minutes left in the game Kennedy's side were leading by three points and looked set for victory, however, Paddy Donoghue and Dick Tobin scored two quick goals. Kennedy missed a late goal chance in that game when his scooped effort ended up on top of the net. Kilkenny won the game by 4-2 to 2-6.

Two years later in 1924 Kennedy captured a second Munster title as Tipp defeated reigning provincial champions Limerick by 3-1 to 2-2. The subsequent All-Ireland semi-final saw Galway, the reigning All-Ireland champions, defeat Kennedy's side by just a single point.

Tipp retained their provincial crown in 1925 with an overwhelming defeat of Watreford by 6-6 to 1-2. It was Kennedy's third Munster medal. Tipp later trounced Antrim to qualify for and All-Ireland final with Galway. Kennedy's side got off to a great start with two quick goals and never looked back. Tipperary won the game by 5-6 to 1-5 giving Kennedy his first All-Ireland medal.

1926 saw Tipperary surrender their Munster title to Cork after an exciting three-game saga. Prior to this the Tipperary team embarked on a tour of North America in May, playing and winning six games. Kennedy scored 27 goals on the tour, including seven in one game.

The next few years saw Cork dominate the provincial championship; however, Kennedy captured a National Hurling League medal with Tipp in 1928. Tipp bounced back two years later in 1930 with Kennedy collecting a fourth Munster medal at the expense of Clare. The subsequent All-Ireland final saw Dublin provide the opposition. The first half was a close affair; however, goals by Kennedy and captain John Joe Callanan gave Tipp the edge. The Munster men hung on to win by 2-7 to 1-3, giving Kennedy his second All-Ireland medal.

Tipp went into decline for the next few years as Limerick emerged as the dominant team in Munster. Kennedy continued to play with Tipp until a serious injury forced his retirement from the inter-county scene in 1936.

=== Provincial ===
Kennedy also lined out with Munster in the inter-provincial hurling competition. He first played for his province in the inaugural year of the Railway Cup competition in 1927, however, Leinster were the victors on that occasion. Kennedy collected his first Railway Cup winners’ medal in 1928. It was the first of four titles in-a-row. He won his fifth and final Railway Cup medal in 1934.

== Post-playing career ==
In retirement from playing Murphy maintained a keen interest in Tipperary's hurling and football affairs. He served as a selector on various Tipperary hurling teams during the golden period in the 1950s and 1960s.

Martin Kennedy died in 1983. He was posthumously honoured in 2000 when he was named in the full-forward position on the Tipperary Hurling Team of the Century.
