= Gaelic Senior Softball Singles =

The All-Ireland Senior Softball Singles title (M Donnelly 60 x 30 Singles) is an all-Ireland Gaelic Athletic Association competition between all 32 counties of Ireland which first commenced in 1925. The first senior hardball singles title was won by M. Joyce of Dublin, a player from Urlingford, County Kilkenny. Kilkenny have won the most titles, with a total of 22.

The 2007 final will was contested by Michael 'Ducksy' Walsh of Kilkenny and Eoin Kennedy of Dublin and Saint Brigid's GAA. Eoin won the final in two straight games by winning 21-20 and 21-6 to retain his title. Eoin then went on to win it in 2008, 2009 and 2010, which means he has now won the title seven times in a row. Since then, he has won three more titles, while Robbie McCarthy of Westmeath and Mullingar Handball Club won seven titles.

== Champions ==
Year	Champion	County
1925	M. Joyce	Dublin
1926	T. Behan	Kilkenny
1927	W. McGuire	Dublin
1928	J. McNally	Mayo
1929	D. Brennan	Kilkenny
1930	P. Perry	Roscommon
1931	P. Perry	Roscommon
1932	P. Perry	Roscommon
1933	P. Perry	Roscommon
1934	P. Perry	Roscommon
1935	P. Perry	Roscommon
1936	P. Perry	Roscommon
1937	P. Perry	Roscommon
1938	J.J. Gilmartin	Kilkenny
1939	J.J. Gilmartin	Kilkenny
1940	M. Walsh	Galway
1941	J. Dunne	Kilkenny
1942	No championship	
1943	No championship	
1944	No championship	
1945	No championship	
1946	J.J. Gilmartin	Kilkenny
1947	L. Rowe	Dublin
1948	J. Bergin	Tipperary
1949	L. Rowe	Dublin
1950	J. Bergin	Tipperary
1951	L. Rowe	Dublin
1952	J. Ryan	Wexford
1953	M. Griffin	Cork
1954	J. Ryan	Wexford
1955	J. Ryan	Wexford
1956	J. Ryan	Wexford
1957	J. Ryan	Wexford
1958	P. Downey	Kerry
1959	F. Confrey	Louth
1960	F. Confrey	Louth
1961	P. Downey	Kerry
1962	J.Delaney	Kilkenny
1963	J. Maher	Louth
1964	J. Maher	Louth
1965	R. Lyng	Wexford
1966	S. McCabe	Monaghan
1967	S. McCabe	Monaghan
1968	J. Maher	Louth
1969	J. Maher	Louth
1970	J. Maher	Louth
1971	R. Lyng	Wexford
1972	P. Murphy	Wexford
1973	J. Maher	Louth
1974	P. Kirby	Clare
1975	P. Kirby	Clare
1976	P. Kirby	Clare
1977	P. Kirby	Clare
1978	R. Lyng	Wexford
1979	T. O'Rourke	Kildare
1980	P. Ryan	Dublin
1981	P. Reilly	Kilkenny
1982	O. Harold	Kilkenny
1983	A. Ryan	Tipperary
1984	T. O'Rourke	Kildare
1985	M. Walsh	Kilkenny
1986	M. Walsh	Kilkenny
1987	M. Walsh	Kilkenny
1988	M. Walsh	Kilkenny
1989	M. Walsh	Kilkenny
1990	M. Walsh	Kilkenny
1991	M. Walsh	Kilkenny
1992	M. Walsh	Kilkenny
1993	M. Walsh	Kilkenny
1994	M. Walsh	Kilkenny
1995	M. Walsh	Kilkenny
1996	M. Walsh	Kilkenny
1997	M. Walsh	Kilkenny
1998	W. O'Connor	Meath
1999	M. Walsh	Kilkenny
2000	M. Walsh	Kilkenny
2001	M. Walsh	Kilkenny
2002	E. Kennedy	Dublin
2003	T. Sheridan	Meath
2004	E. Kennedy	Dublin
2005	E. Kennedy	Dublin
2006	E. Kennedy	Dublin
2007	E. Kennedy	Dublin
2008	E. Kennedy	Dublin
2009	E. Kennedy	Dublin
2010	E. Kennedy	Dublin
2011	R. McCarthy	Westmeath
2012	R. McCarthy	Westmeath
2013	R. McCarthy	Westmeath
2014	E. Kennedy	Dublin
2015	R. McCarthy	Westmeath
2016	R. McCarthy	Westmeath
2017	R. McCarthy	Westmeath
2018	R. McCarthy	Westmeath
2019	E. Kennedy	Dublin
2020	R. McCarthy	Westmeath
2021	No championship	
2022	R. McCarthy	Westmeath
2023		

== Winners by County ==
	Team	Number of Wins	Winning Years
1	Kilkenny	25	1926, 1929, 1938, 1939, 1941, 1946, 1962, 1981, 1982, 1985, 1986, 1987, 1988, 1989, 1990, 1991, 1992, 1993, 1994, 1995, 1996, 1997, 1999, 2000, 2001
2	Dublin	16	1925, 1927, 1947, 1949, 1951, 1980, 2002, 2004, 2005, 2006, 2007, 2008, 2009, 2010, 2014, 2019
3	Westmeath	9	2011, 2012, 2013, 2015, 2016, 2017, 2018, 2020, 2022
–	Wexford	9	1952, 1954, 1955, 1956, 1957, 1965, 1971, 1972, 1978
5	Roscommon	8	1930, 1931, 1932, 1933, 1934, 1935, 1936, 1937
–	Louth	8	1959, 1960, 1963, 1964, 1968, 1969, 1970, 1973
7	Clare	4	1974, 1975, 1976, 1977
8	Tipperary	3	1948, 1950, 1983
9	Kerry	2	1958, 1961
–	Monaghan	2	1966, 1967
–	Kildare	2	1979, 1984
–	Meath	2	1998, 2003
13	Mayo	1	1928
–	Galway	1	1940
–	Cork	1	1953

== See also ==
- Gaelic handball
- Gaelic Senior Hardball Singles
