= Coláiste San Dominic Camogie Club =

Irish camogie club

- Coláiste San Dominic
- Founded: 1934
- County: Dublin
- Grounds: Phoenix Park

Playing kits
Standard colours

Senior Club Championships
	All Ireland	Leinster champions	Dublin champions
Camogie:	0	0	4

Coláiste San Dominic is a camogie club that won the Dublin Senior championship on several occasions. Coláiste San Dominic wore a navy gym tunic with a dark blue and white checked blouse.

== Notable players ==
Notable players include Pat Rafferty (later to become a President of the Camogie Association) and All Ireland Camogie Championship winning captains Peggy Griffin and Pat Raftery.
