= The Sportsground =

Multi-purpose stadium in Galway, Ireland

Dexcom Stadium
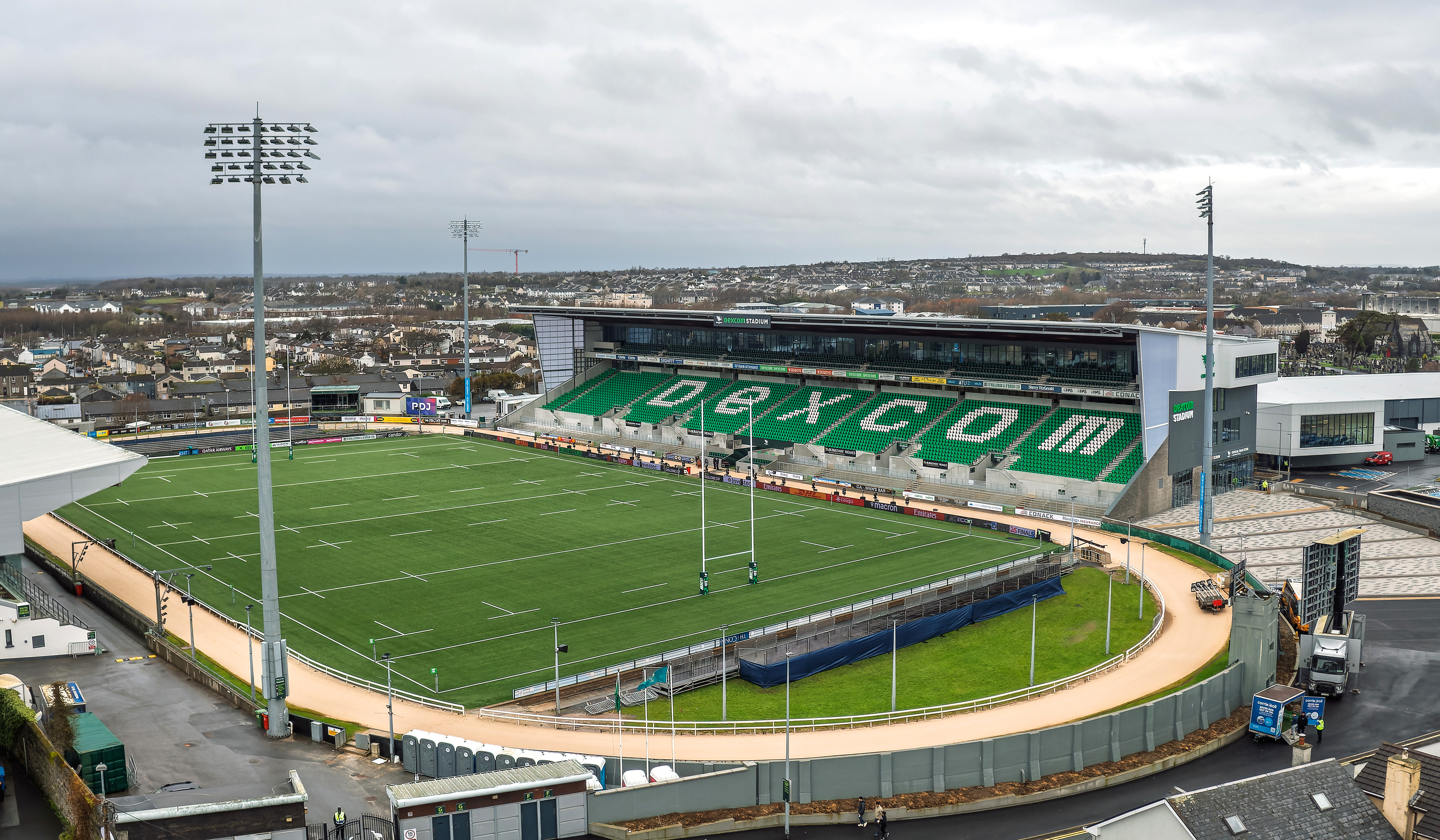
- Aerial view of Dexcom Stadium, Galway.
- Interactive map of Dexcom Stadium
- Location: College Road, Galway, Ireland
- Coordinates: 53.2790°N 9.0397°W
- Owner: The Galway Agricultural & Sports Society Ltd.
- Capacity: 10,500; 12,500 (expandable) Capacity history: 5,500 (2003–2011) 7,800 (2013–2016) 8,129 (2016–2024) 6,170 (2024–2025) 3,928 (2025) 12,500 (2026–present)
- Surface: Pitch (3G synthetic surface)
- Record attendance: 12,481 (Connacht vs Leinster, 24 January 2026)
- Public transit: Galway railway station

Construction
- Opened: 1928

Tenants
- Connacht Rugby (1927–present); Greyhound Racing Ireland; Galway United (1993)

Website
- Rugby

Dexcom Stadium (formerly The Sportsground) in Galway, Ireland is the home of Connacht Rugby. It opened in 1927 and holds up to 10,500 people without temporary seating, 12,500 with temporary seating. When greyhound racing takes place there and at adjoining premises, it trades as the Galway Greyhound Stadium.

== History ==
=== 20th Century ===
The Sports Ground, or Sports Field as it was also known, opened in 1928. The first rugby team to use the ground was Galwegians RFC who used the ground after moving from the Grammar School grounds. In the 1930s, it hosted the varsity matches and Connacht Senior Cup matches for the University of Galway.

=== Renovations (2011–2016) ===
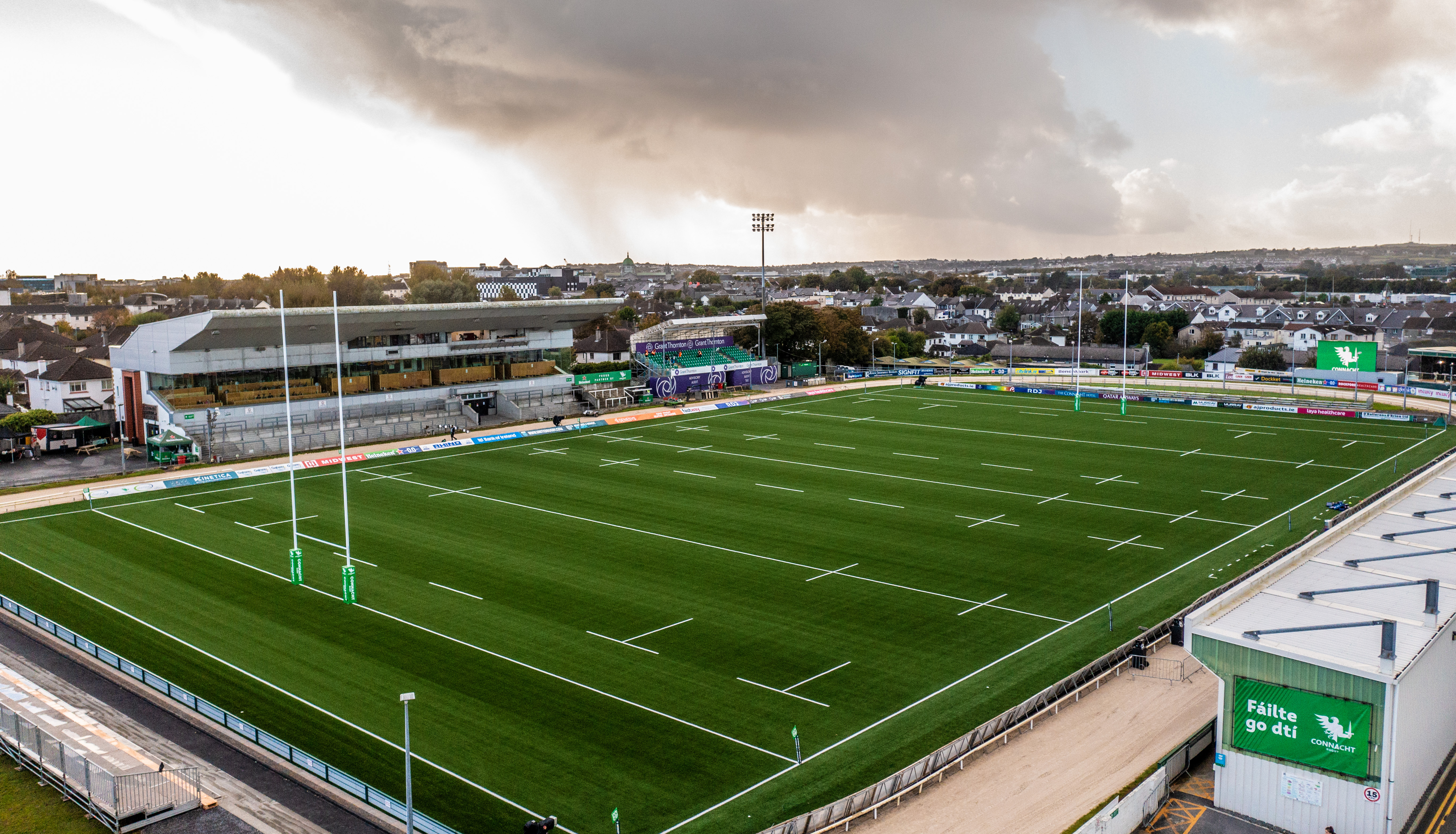
View of The Sportsground prior to the new Clan Stand

Up until 2011, the regular capacity of The Sportsground was 5,500. The stadium was modified and extended in 2011, and again in 2016, instigated by the success of Connacht Rugby. The facilities include the:

- Main Stand – which has enclosed corporate facilities and covered terrace underneath
- Clan Terrace – a covered terrace on the clubhouse side of the ground
- Covered Stand – a covered seated stand to the side of the main stand which holds 300 people
- Uncovered terracing – at the Bohermore and College Road ends of the ground

On 19 November 2011, a then record crowd of 9,120 watched Connacht take on Toulouse in the team's first ever home Heineken Cup match.

Connacht's participation in European rugby's most prestigious club competition, the Heineken Cup, for the first time in the 2011–12 season spurred a new phase of development at the Sportsground to extend formal capacity to 7,500 supporters. The existing Clubhouse Terrace was knocked down to be replaced by the new covered "Clan Terrace". This terrace primarily houses season ticket holders. Ancillary work was also undertaken behind the terrace which saw the construction of a new bar (The Clan Bar), food outlets and restroom facilities on the clubhouse side of the ground. A temporary covered and seated "West Stand", adjacent to the existing main stand was also erected for the season. This series of improvements came on the back of developments which the IRFU had helped to fund in the preceding years, such as a new playing surface, a new clubhouse and floodlighting, while a new gymnasium had been built in 2008.

In 2011, planning permission was granted to redevelop the Clan Terrace by building a seated tier above the terrace. This was ultimately not completed.

In the summer of 2016, work was completed on an additional seated and covered stand which can hold 300 people. The stand, situated next to the Main Stand, increased the ground's regular capacity to 8,100. Following a naming rights deal, it was christened as the Grant Thornton Stand.

=== Redevelopment (2022–present) ===
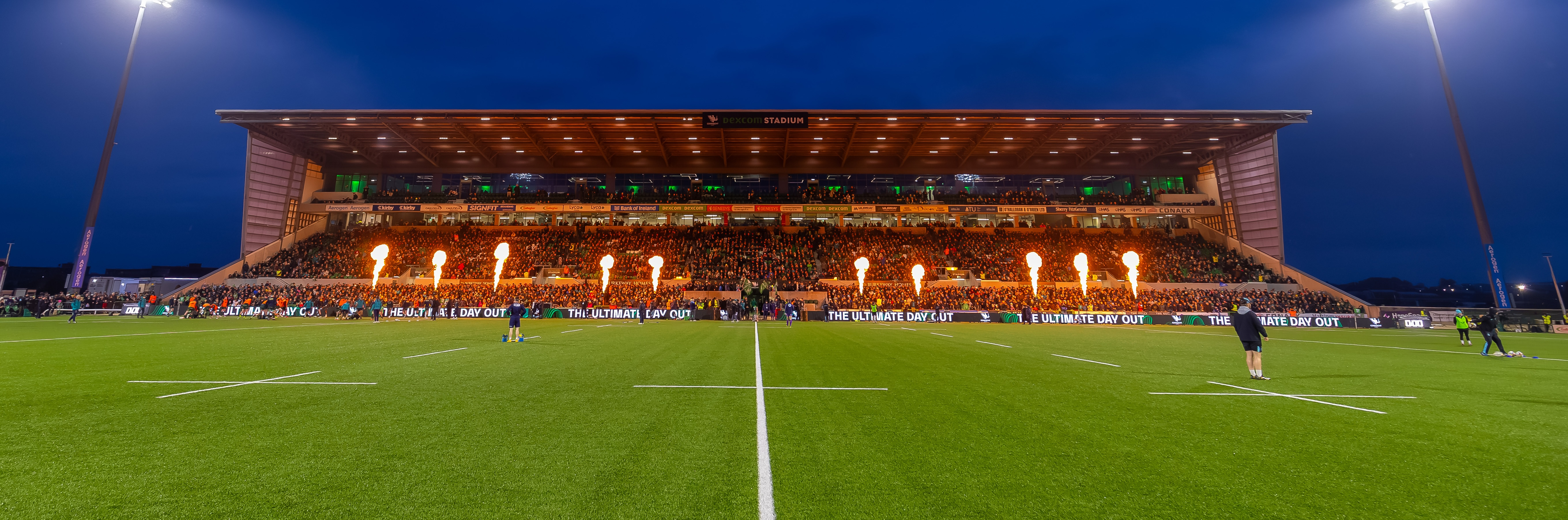
View of the Clan stand on its grand opening on 24 January 2026.

In October 2018, Connacht unveiled plans for a €30m redevelopment of Dexcom Stadium to turn it into a 12,000 seater stadium with the redevelopment to also include a high-performance training centre. Plans were submitted to Galway City Council the following December with full planning permission secured in May 2019.

In January 2020, the Government announced funding totaling €20m towards the project, with €10m coming from the Large Scale Sports Infrastructure Fund, and a further €10m from the Project 2040 fund in line with the Government's commitment to "balanced regional development".

Following a delay due to the COVID-19 pandemic, Phase 1 of the redevelopment began after the 2021/22 season with the installation of a new 3G pitch and LED floodlights.

In 2023, Connacht Rugby Stadium Limited entered into a new lease with Greyhound Racing Ireland. Connacht Rugby Stadium Limited acquired the exclusive naming rights to the property. In January 2024 Connacht Rugby sold the Sportsground naming rights to US healthcare company Dexcom.

On 19 January 2024, Connacht Rugby confirmed that Phase 2 of the redevelopment would begin in March, with building works beginning on the new high-performance centre beside the existing gym. Construction on the new North Stand began after the 2023/24 season, following the demolition of existing Clan Terrace and Clubhouse. The official opening of the €40m redevelopment project took place on 24 January 2026 as Connacht took on Leinster in front of 12,481 fans. The new Clan Stand is three-tier stand with a capacity of over 6,500 including an Atlantic premium level that can cater to over 800 supporters. The new Clan stand’s capacity is broken down into 1,600 terrace, 4,119 seated and 836 hospitality seats. A total of 10 bars and food outlets are spread across three levels along with over 150 toilets.

== International rugby ==
Ireland Development rugby union matches
Date	Home	Score	Opponent	Report
1 December 1984	Ireland B	23–20	Scotland A	
1 November 1994	Ireland Development	13–20	United States	
25 January 2013	Ireland Wolfhounds	10–14	England A	

== Other sports ==
The venue has occasionally hosted Gaelic games fixtures, including the 1932 All-Ireland Senior Camogie Championship Final and the 1942 Galway County Hurling Final.

When Terryland Park was being renovated in 1993, Galway United played at the Sportsgrounds for the first part of that season. It also hosted Galway's first game in European competition in the 1985–86 European Cup Winners' Cup.

== See also ==
- Connacht Rugby
