= Gaelic Senior Hardball Singles =

Gaelic Athletic Association competition

The All-Ireland Senior Hardball Singles title is an all-Ireland Gaelic Athletic Association competition between all 32 counties of Ireland which first commenced in 1925. The first senior hardball singles title was won by W. Aldridge. The current All-Ireland Senior Hardball champion is Robbie McCarthy, who represents Westmeath and Mullingar Handball Club.

== Top winners ==
	Team	Number of Wins	Winning years
1	Dublin	20	1926, 1927, 1928, 1929, 1930, 1931, 1944, 1948, 1949, 1951, 1954, 1955, 2003, 2004, 2005, 2007, 2009, 2010, 2014, 2015
2	Kilkenny	13	1932, 1936, 1937, 1938, 1939, 1940, 1941, 1942, 1945, 1946, 1947, 1986, 1992
3	Louth	12	1961, 1963, 1964, 1968, 1969, 1970, 1991, 1993, 1994, 1995, 1996, 1997
3	Mayo	12	1965, 1967, 1972, 1973, 1974, 1975, 1976, 1977, 1982, 1983, 2006, 2008
4	Kildare	11	1925, 1943, 1950, 1978, 1981, 1984, 1985, 1988, 1989, 1990, 2013
5	Limerick	5	1979, 1980, 2012, 2016, 2017
6	Meath	4	1933, 1935, 1998, 2001
6	Wexford	4	1952, 1953, 1956, 1957
6	Kerry	4	1958, 1959, 1960, 1962
7	Carlow	2	1934, 2002
7	Tipperary	2	1966, 1971
7	Westmeath	2	2011, 2019
8	Roscommon	1	1987

== Previous winners ==
Year	Player	County
1925	W. Aldridge	Kildare
1926	T. Soye	Dublin
1927	T. Soye	Dublin
1928	T. Soye	Dublin
1929	T. Soye	Dublin
1930	T. Soye	Dublin
1931	T. Soye	Dublin
1932	J. Lucas	Kilkenny
1933	P. Bell	Meath
1934	P. Reid	Carlow
1935	S. Tormey	Meath
1936	J.J. Gilmartin	Kilkenny
1937	J.J. Gilmartin	Kilkenny
1938	J.J. Gilmartin	Kilkenny
1939	J.J. Gilmartin	Kilkenny
1940	J.J. Gilmartin	Kilkenny
1941	J.J. Gilmartin	Kilkenny
1942	J.J. Gilmartin	Kilkenny
1943	M. Dowling	Kildare
1944	A. Clarke	Dublin
1945	J.J. Gilmartin	Kilkenny
1946	J.J. Gilmartin	Kilkenny
1947	J.J. Gilmartin	Kilkenny
1948	A. Clarke	Dublin
1949	A. Clarke	Dublin
1950	R. Grattan	Kildare
1951	A. Clarke	Dublin
1952	J. Ryan	Wexford
1953	J. Ryan	Wexford
1954	A. Clarke	Dublin
1955	A. Clarke	Dublin
1956	J. Ryan	Wexford
1957	J. Ryan	Wexford
1958	P. Downey	Kerry
1959	P. Downey	Kerry
1960	P. Downey	Kerry
1961	J. Maher	Louth
1962	P. Downey	Kerry
1963	J. Maher	Louth
1964	J. Maher	Louth
1965	P. McGee	Mayo
1966	P. Hickey	Tipperary
1967	P. McGee	Mayo
1968	J. Maher	Louth
1969	J. Maher	Louth
1970	J. Maher	Louth
1971	P. Hickey	Tipperary
1972	P. McGee	Mayo
1973	P. McGee	Mayo
1974	P. McGee	Mayo
1975	P. McGee	Mayo
1976	P. McGee	Mayo
1977	P. McGee	Mayo
1978	C. Winders	Kildare
1979	P. McGarry	Limerick
1980	P. McGarry	Limerick
1981	P. Winders	Kildare
1982	P. McGee	Mayo
1983	P. McGee	Mayo
1984	P. Winders	Kildare
1985	T. O’Rourke	Kildare
1986	B. Bourke	Kilkenny
1987	M. Walsh	Roscommon
1988	T. O’Rourke	Kildare
1989	T. O’Rourke	Kildare
1990	T. O’Rourke	Kildare
1991	P. McAuley	Louth
1992	B. Bourke	Kilkenny
1993-97	P. McAuley	Louth
1994	P. McAuley	Louth
1995	P. McAuley	Louth
1996	P. McAuley	Louth
1997	P. McAuley	Louth
1998	W. O’Connor	Meath
1999	No Championship	
2000	No Championship	
2001	W. O’Connor	Meath
2002	K. Kane	Carlow
2003	E. Kennedy	Dublin
2004	E. Kennedy	Dublin
2005	E. Kennedy	Dublin
2006	D. Keegan	Mayo
2007	E. Kennedy	Dublin
2008	D. Keegan	Mayo
2009	E. Kennedy	Dublin
2010	E. Kennedy	Dublin
2011	R. McCarthy	Westmeath
2012	S. O'Carroll	Limerick
2013	N. O'Connor	Kildare
2014	E. Kennedy	Dublin
2015	E. Kennedy	Dublin
2016	C.J. Fitzpatrick	Limerick
2017	C.J. Fitzpatrick	Limerick
2018	No Championship	
2019	R. McCarthy	Westmeath
2025	Gary McConnell	Meath

== See also ==
- Gaelic handball
- Gaelic Senior Softball Singles
