= Peggy Hogg =

Personal information
- Born: 7 July 1919 Tralee, County Kerry, Ireland
- Died: 9 October 1994 (aged 75)

Sport
- Sport: Camogie
- Position: goal keeper
Club
- Years: Club
- Old Aloysius Camogie Club
Inter-county titles
- All-Irelands: 3

Peggy Hogg (7 July 1919 – 9 October 1994) was an Irish camogie player for Cork.

== Early life and family ==
Peggy Hogg was born Margaret Mary Hogg in Tralee, County Kerry, on 7 July 1919. Her parents were Margaret (née McCarthy) and John Hogg, a commercial traveller. She was an only child. The family moved to Cork soon after Hogg's birth, and lived at Highfield West, College Road. She attended St Aloysius School, Cork, and Le Bon Sauveur Convent, Holyhead, Wales. After school, she worked as an insurance official in Cork. As well as camogie, Hogg played tennis, both for the Glenanaar tennis club and at inter-provincial level for Munster. She also played hockey at Le Bon Sauveur.

She married Jack Fitzgerald in 1949. He was the brother of her teammate, Mary Fitzgerald. He worked for the Cork harbour commissioners. They had two children: a son, Peter, and a daughter, Geraldine.

== Playing career ==
Hogg joined the Old Aloysius Camogie Club when she finished school, where she took up the goal keeping position. Known for her athleticism, she was promoted to the Cork senior team. During this period, Cork dominated camogie in Munster, winning the provincial title for a number of years. Hogg won her first all-Ireland medal with the Cork team in 1935. She became well known for her performance during the 1939 All-Ireland Camogie Championship semi-final, when she deflected all but one goal from Hanratty of the Louth team.

The team Hogg played with against Galway at Croke Park in 1940 had ten players from Hogg's club, Old Aloysians. Due to the clash in the team County colours, the Cork team wore their Old Aloysians kit. The teams met again for the all-Ireland final that year, with Cork taking the title. Playing against Dublin the next year, Cork achieved a hat trick of all-Ireland titles. Hogg captained Cork in 1942, again meeting Dublin in the all-Ireland final in Mardyke. The first match was a draw, with both sides finishing at 1–1. Dublin won the replay at Croke Park. Hogg missed the 1943 all-Ireland final due to an injury to her arm. Because of a dispute, Cork did not play in the championship for another eight years, by which time Hogg had retired.

== Later life and legacy ==
Hogg's style and efficiency as a goal keeper has led to comparisons with Dublin hurling goal keeper, Tommy Daly. She was awarded the Cú Chulainn Hall of Fame award in 1960, and in 1964 Club na nGael listed her on their roll of honour for GAA players, "stars of the past". Hogg died at her home, Meadowlands, Wilton Road, Cork on 9 October 1994.
