= Fohenagh =

Civil parish in County Galway, Ireland

Coordinates: 53.386°N 8.386°W

Fohenagh or Fohanagh (Irish: Fothannach) is a small village and civil parish in County Galway, Ireland. Fohenagh has a school, a community hall, a community sports pitch and a Roman Catholic church. The village is approximately 15 km from Ballinasloe and 4 km from Ahascragh village. The local GAA club, Ahascragh-Fohenagh Hurling Club, was formed in the 1990s following the amalgamation of two former village clubs.
