= Tom Sheridan (handballer) =

Gaelic handball player

Tom Sheridan is a GAA handball player from Ireland who represents his county Meath.

== Past achievements ==
- 1979 U12 60 x 30 Doubles (with M McGovern)
- 1980 U12 60 x 30 Doubles (with M McGovern)
- 1982
  - U14 40 x 20 Doubles (with A McGovern)
  - U14 60 x 30 Doubles (with A McGovern)
- 1983
  - U16 40 x 20 Doubles (with A McGovern)
  - U16 60 x 30 Doubles (with A McGovern)
  - 1984
  - U16 40 x 20 Doubles (with D Gough)
  - U16 60 x 30 Doubles (with B Ferguson)
- 1985
  - Minor 40 x 20 Doubles (with W O’Connor)
  - Minor 60 x 30 Doubles (with W O’Connor)
  - Minor Hardball Singles
  - Minor Hardball Doubles (with W O’Connor)
- 1986
  - Minor 60 x 30 S
  - Minor 60 x 30 Doubles (with W O’Connor)
  - Minor Hardball Doubles (with W O’Connor)
- 1987
  - Senior 40 x 20 Doubles (with J McGovern)
  - Junior 60 x 30 Doubles (with J McGovern)
- 1988 Senior 40 x 20 Doubles (with J McGovern)
- 1989 Junior Hardball Doubles (with C McGovern)
- 1990 Senior 40 x 20 Doubles (with J McGovern)
- 1992
  - Senior 40 x 20 Doubles (with J McGovern)
  - Senior 60 x 30 Doubles (with J McGovern)
  - Senior Hardball Doubles (with W O’Connor)
- 1993 Senior 40 x 20 Doubles (with J McGovern)
- 1994
  - Senior Hardball Doubles (with W O’Connor)
  - Senior 60 x 30 Doubles (with J McGovern)
- 1996 Senior 40 x 20 Doubles (with E Jensen)
- 1997 Senior 40 x 20 Doubles (with E Jensen)
- 1998
  - Senior 60 x 30 Doubles (with W O’Connor)
  - Senior Hardball Doubles (with W O’Connor)
- 1999 Senior 60 x 30 Doubles (with W O’Connor)
- 2000 Senior 40 x 20 Doubles (with W O’Connor)
- 2001 Senior 60 x 30 Doubles (with W O’Connor)
- 2002
  - Senior 40 x 20 Doubles (with W O’Connor)
  - Senior 60 x 30 Doubles (with W O’Connor)
- 2003
  - Senior 60 x 30 Singles
  - Senior 60 x 30 Doubles (with W O’Connor)
- 2004 Senior 60 x 30 Doubles (with W O’Connor)
