= 1932 Railway Cup Hurling Championship =

Irish hurling competition

1932 Railway Cup
- Dates: 28 February 1932 – 17 March 1932
- Teams: 3
- Champions: Leinster (2nd title); Jim Dermody (captain)
- Runners-up: Munster; Eudie Coughlan (captain)

Tournament statistics
- Matches played: 2
- Goals scored: 18 (9 per match)
- Points scored: 24 (12 per match)
- Top scorer(s): Din O'Neill (5-04)

The 1932 Railway Cup Hurling Championship was the sixth series of the inter-provincial hurling Railway Cup. Two matches were played between 28 February and 17 March 1932. It was contested by Connacht, Leinster and Munster.

Munster entered the championship as the defending champions.

On 17 March 1932, Leinster won the Railway Cup after a 6-08 to 4-04 defeat of Munster in the final at Croke Park, Dublin. This was their second title over all and their first since 1927. The final was notable in that the first ever point scored directly from a sideline cut occurred in it, after a rule change by Central Council the day before. Paddy Drennan of Leinster is credited as being the first scorer.

Leinster's Din O'Neill was the Railway Cup top scorer with 5-04.

== Results ==
=== Semi-final ===
| 28 February 1932 Semi-final | Leinster | 6-08 - 2-04 | Connacht | St. Brendan's Park, Birr |
| | D O'Neill 3-1, J Dunne 2-1, P Drennan 1-2, T Leahy 0-3, Matty Power 0-1, J Leahy 0-1. | | M King 1-0, Curran 1-0, M Gill 0-2, J Cunningham 0-1, I Harney 0-1. |

=== Final ===
| 17 March 1932 Final | Munster | 4-04 - 6-08 | Leinster | Croke Park, Dublin |
| | M Kennedy 3-1, M Ahern 1-1, M Cross 0-2. | | D O'Neill 2-3, S Hegarty 2-0, T Leahy 1-1, E Byrne 1-0, P Drennan 0-2, Matty Power 0-1, P Phelan 0-1. | Attendance: 13,339; Referee: S Jordan (Galway) |

== Top scorers ==
Top scorers overall

| Rank | Player | County | Tally | Total | Matches | Average |
|---|---|---|---|---|---|---|
| 1 | Din O'Neill | Leinster | 5-04 | 19 | 2 | 9.50 |
| 2 | Martin Kennedy | Munster | 3-01 | 10 | 1 | 10.00 |
| 3 | Johnny Dunne | Leinster | 2-01 | 7 | 2 | 3.50 |
| 3 | Tommy Leahy | Leinster | 1-04 | 7 | 2 | 3.50 |
| 3 | Paddy Drennan | Leinster | 1-04 | 7 | 2 | 3.50 |

== Sources ==
- Donegan, Des, The Complete Handbook of Gaelic Games (DBA Publications Limited, 2005).
- Fennelly, Teddy and Dowling, Paddy, "Ninety Years of GAA in Laois" (Leinster Express, 1975)
