= Seán O'Duffy =

Irish sports administrator (1886–1981)

Seaghán Ua Dúbhthaigh
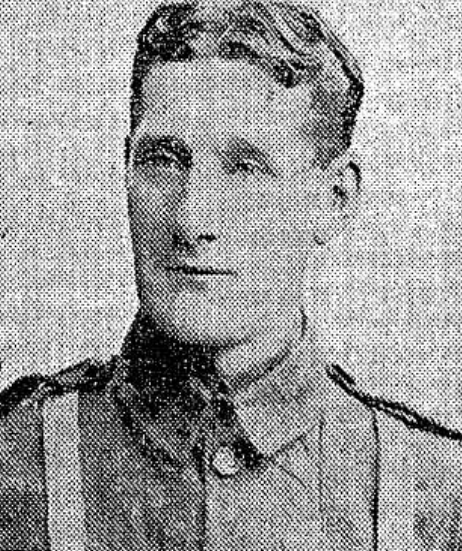
- O'Duffy in his volunteer uniform, aged 31

1st Honorary Administrator of the Camogie Association
- In office 1924–1980
- Preceded by: Áine Ní Ríain
- Succeeded by: Jo Golden

Personal details
- Born: 1886 Killawalla, County Mayo, Ireland
- Died: 20 October 1981 (aged 94–95) Meath Hospital, Dublin, Ireland

Seán O'Duffy (Irish: Seaghán Ua Dúbhthaigh; 1886 – 20 October 1981) was an Irish sports administrator. For 40 years, he was heavily involved in the development of camogie in Ireland; coordinating it on a national level. O'Duffy's contributions to camogie have been widely respected and the title "Mr. Camogie," is often associated with him.

== Early life ==
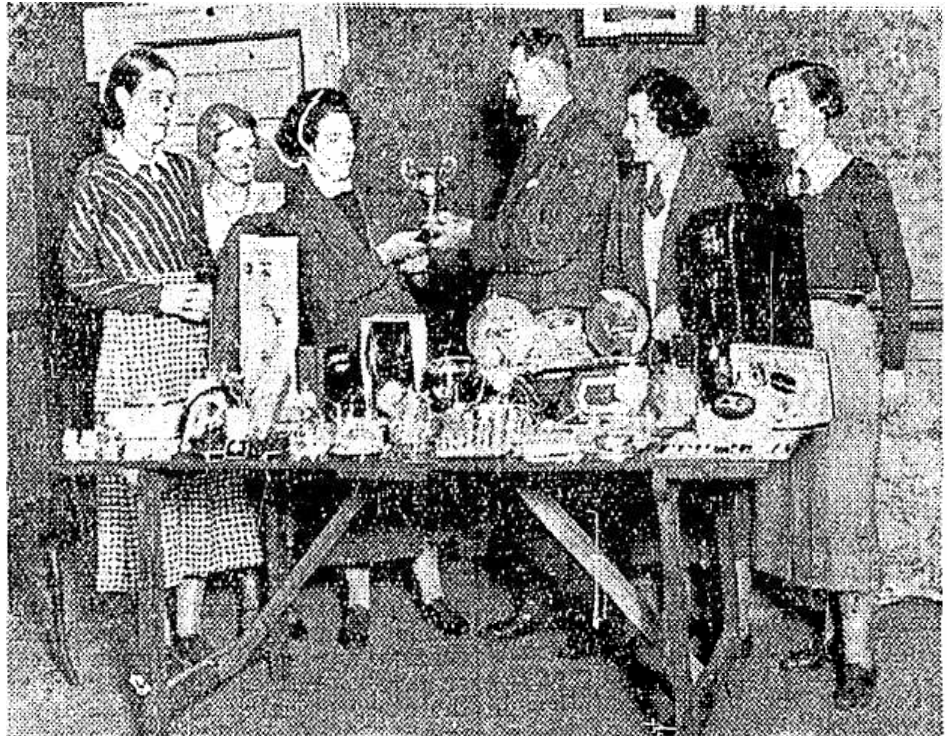
Sean O'Duffy and Kathleen Mckeown before their marriage

O'Duffy was born in the year 1886, in Cill an Bhaile (Killawalla), County Mayo, Ireland; a town not far from Westport. He lived there until the age of 14, arriving in Dublin during the year 1900. During his time in Dublin, O'Duffy resided in Kenilworth Park, Harold's Cross, an inner suburb located in the south of Dublin. Throughout his life, O'Duffy had a strong interest in Camoige, but was also involved in political activities, taking part in the Dublin lock-out in 1913; a strike led by Jim Larkin, who was said to be O'Duffy's "hero" in his early life. In the year 1940, O'Duffy married a girl named Kathleen McKeown, from Omeath, County Louth; whom he worked with to regularly supply newspapers with camogie updates.

== Career ==
A soccer player and referee in the early 1910s, he became a founder member of Crokes GAA Club and a GAA referee, handling up to five matches on Sundays and refereeing as far away as Innisfail Park in New York in 1930. He was one of the group of people who sponsored the movement to have the Jones's Road Sportsground dedicated to Archbishop Thomas Croke. He was present at the reorganisation convention of the Camogie Association under the auspices of the Crokes cub in 1910 which resulted in the spread of camogie to 11 counties.

== Roles in Republican Organisations ==
O'Duffy joined the Irish Volunteers in time for the Easter Rising on 1 April 1916. He fought the entire week and remained part of the Irish Volunteers until 31 March 1919. O'Duffy was a member of the A Company in the 1st Battalion, in the Four Courts Garrison, under his commanding officer, D. O'Callaghan. He fought in the most hectic battlegrounds in North King Street to Church Street sector, including: North King St., Columbhille Hall, North Brunswick St., the Linenhall Barracks on Lisborn St., and Church St. One family recounts the story of how when one of their family members fell, according to witness reports, O’Duffy helped to carry their fallen kin to the hospital. He was imprisoned after the Rising in Stafford Jail until August 1916. He joined again as soon he was released from his imprisonment and was even promoted to 2nd Lieutenant in 1917. O'Duffy would later be promoted again, this time to Captain for his assistance in Irish intelligence work with Michael Collins. He sided with he Republican side after the Easter Rising and was part of the Irish Republican Army from 1 April 1919 until 11 July 1921. O'Duffy would eventually return to civilian life in Dublin. Nevertheless, even after the Easter Rising and his imprisonment, he managed to hold onto the uniform, a greenish-grey fabric, that identified him as part of the Volunteer Army. He kept the uniform for 50 years, wearing it again during the Golden Jubilee Commemoration of the Easter Rising.

== Later life and death ==
In his later years, O'Duffy became established in the world of GAA (Gaelic Athletic Association), and, the traditional Irish sport of camogie. O'Duffy, known as "Mr. Camogie", donated the O’Duffy cup for the winners of the first All-Ireland Camogie Championship in 1932. O’Duffy also campaigned to the Dublin Corporation for more playing fields in 1934. In 1940 he married Kathleen McKeown from Omeath, a prominent camogie referee. In 1966, O'Duffy marched at the head of the veterans for the 1916 memorial service when they marched to the GPO. Shortly after, on 29 March 1979, the radio programme 'Highways and Byways' interviewed O'Duffy for their 1916 archives, in which he described finding out Patrick Pearse had surrendered during the 1916 rising.

He joined the Irish Civil Service in 1925 and worked there until his retirement, living in 50 Cashmir Road in Harold's Cross, Dublin. He died on 20 October 1981 in Meath Hospital after a short illness and is buried in Glasnevin Cemetery.
