= Eoin Kennedy =

Irish handball player

Eoin Kennedy is an Irish handball player from County Dublin, Ireland. He is a member of Dublin GAA club St Brigid's. By profession he is an engineer and a former lecturer at NUI Maynooth.

The holder of fourteen senior handball titles, Kennedy has also won three Irish Nationals Open Singles and a Collegiate title in 2001 while representing Dublin City University in Minneapolis, USA. In 1999, he won the US Nationals Open Singles and two years later won the Canadian singles final with a resounding win over Canadian player Merv Deckert in Halifax, Nova Scotia, Canada. He has three Vodafone All Star Awards. In August 2006, he partnered Cork's Tony Healy to beat reigning champions Paul Brady and Michael Finnegan from Cavan in the Men's Open Doubles final in the World Championships in Edmonton, Alberta, Canada.

Kennedy has won several awards for his play; these include All Star Awards in 2002 and 2004 and he was presented with the Vodafone All Star Player of the Year Award in February 2006.

== Career ==
=== 2005 ===
In 2005, Kennedy won the All-Ireland Senior Doubles 40 x 20, and 60 x 30 Championships with Egin Jensen, becoming the first pair representing Dublin GAA to win the Senior Doubles title since the Rowe brothers won back in 1948. Kennedy also won the 2005 hardball singles.

=== 2006 ===
Kennedy was sponsored by Vogue Bathrooms for his 2006 and 2007 seasons.

Kennedy defeated Michael 'Duxie' Walsh 21-20 to 21-16 to line up an All-Ireland Senior Singles Final showdown with Meath's Tom Sheridan. The Final was set to take place on Sept 2nd 2006. Eoin won his second consecutive All-Ireland Softball (60x30) with a valiant performance against Sheridan at Croke Park on 3 September 2006. It took a full three games for Kennedy to beat the 2003 All-Ireland champion Sheridan, he beat Sheridan in the end with a scoreline of 21-5. This means that Kennedy has enjoyed a very successful period having picked up the World Open doubles championship in August 2006.

Eoin Kennedy and Egin Jensen of Na Fianna claimed their first ever All-Ireland hardball senior doubles title on Saturday, 28 October 2006. They defeated Meath rivals Tom Sheridan and Walter O'Connor (both Kells) in the final in Mullingar.

Honours:

World Men’s Doubles Champion (with Tony Healy, Cork), Canada 2006

9 All-Ireland Senior Singles titles (4 60x30, 1 40x20, 4 hardball) 5 All-Ireland Senior Doubles titles (with Egin Jensen, 2 60x30, 1 40x20, 2 hardball) 3 Men’s Irish Open Singles titles Winner of International Collegiate Singles title (representing DCU), 2001 Winner of USA and Canadian Open Singles titles (1999 and 2001 respectively) Numerous underage All-Ireland, USA and World titles etc.

3 Vodafone/GAA All-Star awards

=== 2007 ===
Kennedy contended the M Donnelly 60 x 30 Singles Handball final for the second year in a row. He played as reigning champion against Michael 'Ducksy' Walsh of Kilkenny and won by 21-20 and 21-6 in the second game. Eoin completed the treble in the senior softball doubles along with his partner Egin Jensen.

=== 2009 ===
Kennedy won his 21st consecutive All-Ireland senior title this year and also travelled to the USA where he competed in the 40 x 20 World championships at which he won the doubles with his partner Michael Finnigan.

=== 2010 ===
Kennedy was named as handball player of the year for 2010. He received his award at a banquet at Croke Park on Saturday, 27 November 2010.

=== 2014 ===
Kennedy was crowned GAA Handball M Donnelly 60x30 champion once more in 2014. He defeated favourite three-in-a-row champion Robbie McCarthy at 35 years of age.
