= Celia Quinn =

Irish camogie player

Personal information
- Native name: Síle Nic Coinn (Irish)
- Born: County Antrim, Northern Ireland

Sport
- Sport: Camogie
- Position: full back
Club*
Years	Club	Apps (scores)
	Club	?
Inter-county**
Years	County	Apps (scores)
	Antrim	?
- * club appearances and scores correct as of (16:31, 30 June 2010 (UTC)). **Inter County team apps and scores correct as of (16:31, 30 June 2010 (UTC)).

Celia Quinn is a former camogie player, captain of the All Ireland Camogie Championship winning team in 1947. She previously won All Ireland senior medals in 1945 and 1946.
