= Johnny Dunne =

Irish hurler

Personal information
- Native name: Seán Ó Duinn (Irish)
- Nickname: Lovely Johnny Dunne
- Born: 1 December 1903 Bennettsbridge, County Kilkenny, Ireland
- Died: 7 September 1954 (aged 50) Bennettsbridge, County Kilkenny, Ireland
- Occupation: Postman

Sport
- Sport: Hurling
- Position: Full-forward
Clubs
- Years: Club
- Mooncoin; Dicksboro
Club titles
- Kilkenny titles: 1
Inter-county
- Years: County
- 1928-1938: Kilkenny
Inter-county titles
- Leinster titles: 3
- All-Irelands: 2
- NHL: 1

Johnny Dunne (1 December 1903 – 7 September 1954) was an Irish hurler who played as a full-forward for the Kilkenny senior team.

Born in Bennettsbridge, County Kilkenny, Dunne first arrived on the inter-county scene at the age of twenty-three when he first linked up with the Kilkenny senior team. Dunne went on to play a key part for Kilkenny during a successful era for the team, and won two All-Ireland medals, three Leinster medals and one National Hurling League medal. He was an All-Ireland runner-up on one occasion.

As a member of the Leinster inter-provincial team, Dunne won two Railway Cup medals. At club level he won one championship medal with Mooncoin.

Dunne's retirement came following the conclusion of the 1938 championship.
