= Máire Gill =

Irish political activist (1891–1977)

Máire Gill, Máire Ní Ghiolla
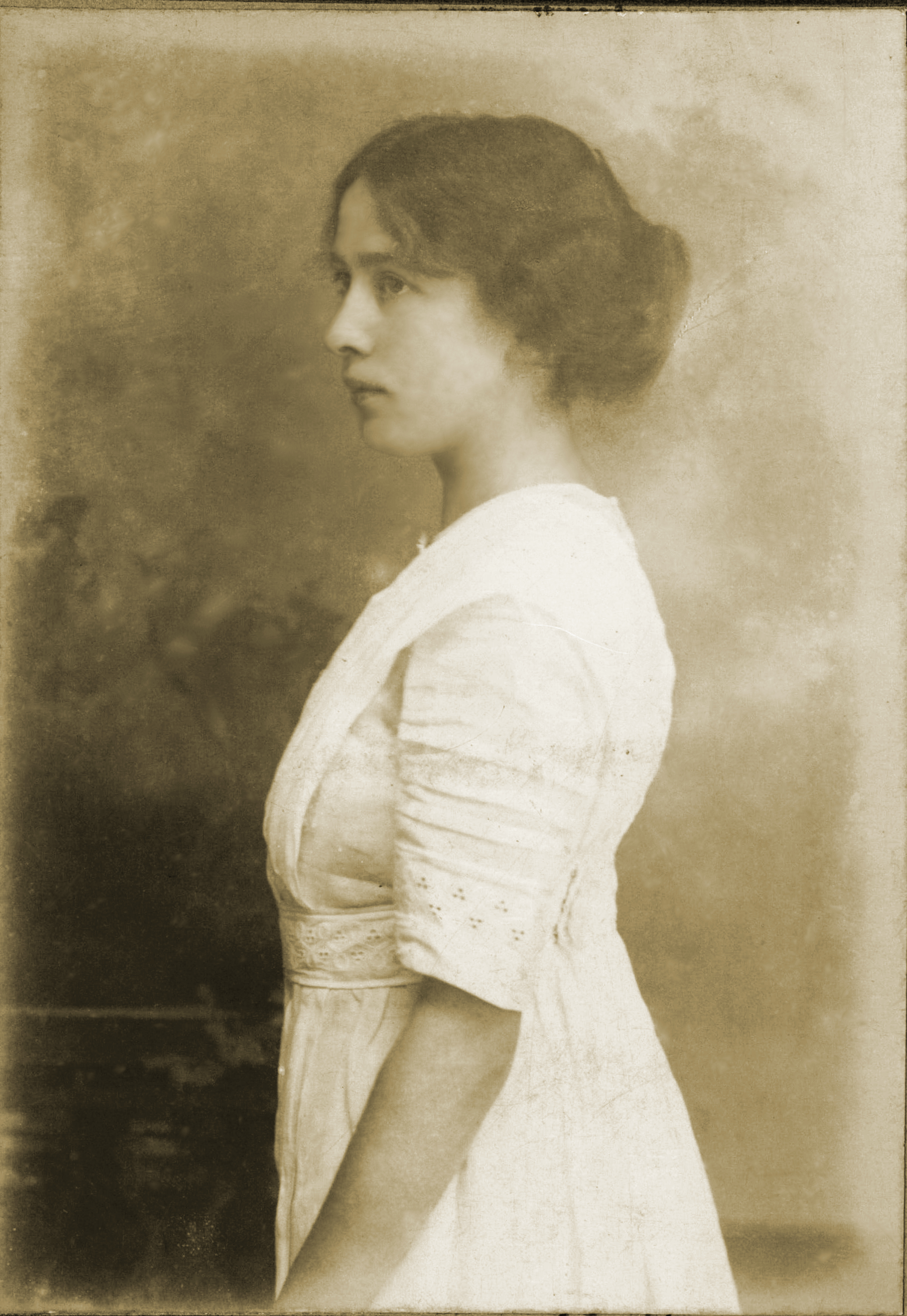

3rd President of the Camogie Association
- In office 1923–1941
- Succeeded by: Agnes O'Farrelly

Personal details
- Born: 24 March 1891 Murphystown, County Dublin
- Died: 25 May 1977 (aged 86) Dublin, Ireland
- Profession: Printer

Máire ‘Mollie’ Gill (Máire Ní Ghiolla) (1891–1977) was a political activist who became third and longest-serving president of the Camogie Association and captained a Dublin team to an All Ireland championship while serving as president of the association.

== Family and early life ==
Máire, or as known more commonly by her nickname 'Mollie', Gill was born in County Dublin to James and Jane Gill on 24 March 1891. Gill's father James was employed as a boot-maker in Dublin while her mother was solely focused on domestic duties within the home. She was the second eldest child in a family of eight. She resided in a second-class cottage in the townland of Murphystown in Sandyford with her parents, brothers James and Michael J. and sister Margaret. Gill was raised in a Roman Catholic household. Gill was the only member of her family who was able to read and write in both English and Irish, and had Irish classes orgnaised for her by the Yeats family as well as lessons in drama.

When she was 11 years old Gill’s older sister Jane Gill left their family home in Murphystown to work with Susan Mary "Lily" and Elizabeth "Lolly" Yeats, of the well-known Irish arts and literary Yeats family, in Dun Emer Industries, which would later be known as the Cuala Press. Dun Emer Industries was founded by Elizabeth Yeats and Evelyn Gleeson in 1902 who published work by Irish writers including several works by Elizabeth's brother W. B. Yeats. At the age of 17 Gill herself was employed by the Yeats sisters as an assistant printer at the then Cuala Press which was located on Baggot Street, Dublin 2, specialising as a printer publishing the work of Irish writers. Throughout her camogie career and political activism Gill would continue to work at the Cuala Press into her later life, moving on to be the principle compositor of the press.

Gill was very interested in immersing herself in Irish culture from a young age through learning Irish and taking part in cultural activities. Her camogie career started in her youth as she became a member of the Crokes Hurling club, which set up their camogie section in 1906. Her active involvement in the Crokes and Inghinidhe na hÉireann encouraged her to expand her knowledge of Irish culture, literature, history and art as well as the language itself.

== Cultural activism ==
Molly went to work with the Dun Emer industries established by Evelyn Gleeson to promote Irish crafts and industries and then with Cuala Press. She befriended the sisters of William Butler Yeats, Elizabeth and Lily, started learning Irish, and joined Inghinidhe na hÉireann and Cumann na mBan, serving on the executive committee of the Irish Republican Prisoners Dependant Fund. She took the anti-treaty side during the Civil War, and was arrested in May 1923 alongside the secretary of the Camogie Association, Áine Ní Riain, and was interned in Kilmainham for several months. She continued to work in Cuala Press until 1969.

== Camogie playing career ==
She joined Crokes football and hurling club where Harry Boland was a member and marched with the Dublin camogie delegation to the funeral of Jeremiah O'Donovan Rossa. By 1922 she was one of Dublin's most prominent referees and presided over meetings of the Dublin league.

== Camogie President ==
When Cualacht Luithchleas na mBan Gaedheal was revived in 1923 she was elected president. Rules were changed, and lighter sticks were used contributing to a revival in the game, particularly in Dublin and its schools. She served as camogie's representative on the Tailteann Games committee and supported the controversial withdrawal of the sport from the Tailteann festival in 1924, having captained the Dublin team that played London in an alternative international match a few weeks earlier.

She continued to referee and play for both Crokes and Dublin and in 1925 was described as Dublin’s star player in a match against Kilkenny In 1928 she played on the Leinster team which won the inter-provincial Tailteann competition and captained Dublin to victory in the first All Ireland final in 1932.

== Camogie legacy ==
The first decade of her term of office saw considerable progress. The game, which had stagnated around 1910 after an initial period of growth ("whether through lack of encouragement or enthusiasm she did not know," she told the 1933 Camogie congress) increased its presence after meeting indifference outside of Dublin to a position of strength, with 80 clubs in Dublin and 320 clubs in all. This rapid growth was negated considerably by the imposition of a ban on hockey in 1934 and a split in the Association after that ban was removed in 1939, briefly repaired in 1941–43 but which rumbled on until 1951. The association was renamed the National Camoguidheacht Association in 1939.

== Death ==
She died in 1977 and was buried in Glencullen Cemetery Co Dublin.
