= Tipperary GAA =

County board of the Gaelic Athletic Association in Ireland

Tiobraid Árann
- Irish: Tiobraid Árann
- Nickname(s): The Premier County; Tipp; The Home of Hurling; The Blue and Gold
- Province: Munster
- Dominant sport: Hurling
- Ground(s): Semple Stadium, Thurles
- County colours: Blue Gold

County teams
- NFL: Division 4
- NHL: Division 1A
- Football Championship: Sam Maguire Cup
- Hurling Championship: Liam MacCarthy Cup
- Ladies' Gaelic football: Brendan Martin Cup
- Camogie: O'Duffy Cup

The Tipperary County Board of the Gaelic Athletic Association (GAA) (Irish: Cumann Lúthchleas Gael Coiste Chontae Thiobraid Árann) or Tipperary GAA is one of the 32 county boards of the GAA in Ireland, and is responsible for Gaelic games in County Tipperary and the Tipperary county teams.

County Tipperary holds an honoured place in the history of the GAA as the organisation was founded in Hayes' Hotel, Thurles, on 1 November 1884.

The county football team was the second from the province of Munster both to win an All-Ireland Senior Football Championship (SFC) title, as well as to appear in a final, following Limerick.

The county hurling team is third in the all-time rankings for All-Ireland Senior Hurling Championship (SHC) titles, behind only Kilkenny and Cork.

== Governance ==
Tipperary GAA has jurisdiction over the area that is associated with the traditional county of County Tipperary. There are 9 officers on the Board including the Cathaoirleach (Chairperson), Sean Nugent.

=== Past presidents ===
Four Tipperary men have served as president of the GAA. Maurice Davin from Tipperary is the only man to have served two terms as president, while Seán Ryan represented Dublin from 1928 to 1932, though a native of Kilfeacle, County Tipperary. Ryan, a solicitor based in the capital, was the Association's legal advisor over a long period and played a central role in the acquisition and vesting of many club and county grounds in the GAA.

- Maurice Davin: 1884–1887
- Maurice Davin: 1888–1889 (second term)
- Seán Ryan: 1928–1932
- Séamus Gardiner: 1943–1946
- Séamus Ó Riain: 1967–1970

== Colours, crest and symbols ==
Tipperary's team colours are royal blue and gold. Tipperary teams wear blue jerseys with a horizontal gold bar across the center along with white shorts and blue socks.

The Tipperary crest features the Rock of Cashel prominently, with two crossed hurleys and a football below. In the year '1884', when Tipperary GAA was founded, is in the centre of the crest. The original crest was the coat of arms of the Butler family, Dukes and Earls of Ormond, whose arms were adopted by local authorities within their geographic area of influence in South Leinster and East Munster — most notably the county councils of Tipperary (South Riding), Kilkenny, Carlow and Wexford, and which — among other refinements — included a central band of colours, surrounded by star-like designs. This crest was used until the late 1990s when the current crest — depicting the Rock of Cashel with two crossed hurleys and a football — was adopted.

Tipperary did not have an official jersey in the early days of the GAA. Tipperary wore the colours of the county champion club. One example was a white jersey with a green diagonal sash. This jersey design is associated with Tipperary's most historic match in either code, the Bloody Sunday senior football encounter with Dublin at Croke Park in 1920. The current jersey is blue with a gold central band. Those colours were adopted from the Boherlahan, who were county champions in 1925. Those colours were also the colours of the Tubberadora team, which later became Boherlahan. There have been several minor adjustments, especially to the sleeve and collar areas over the years, and — especially — since the introduction of sponsorship in recent decades, which necessitates the reservation of space for company logos.

== Hurling ==
=== Clubs ===
Clubs contest the Tipperary Senior Hurling Championship. That competition's most successful club is Thurles Sarsfields, with 36 titles.

=== County team ===
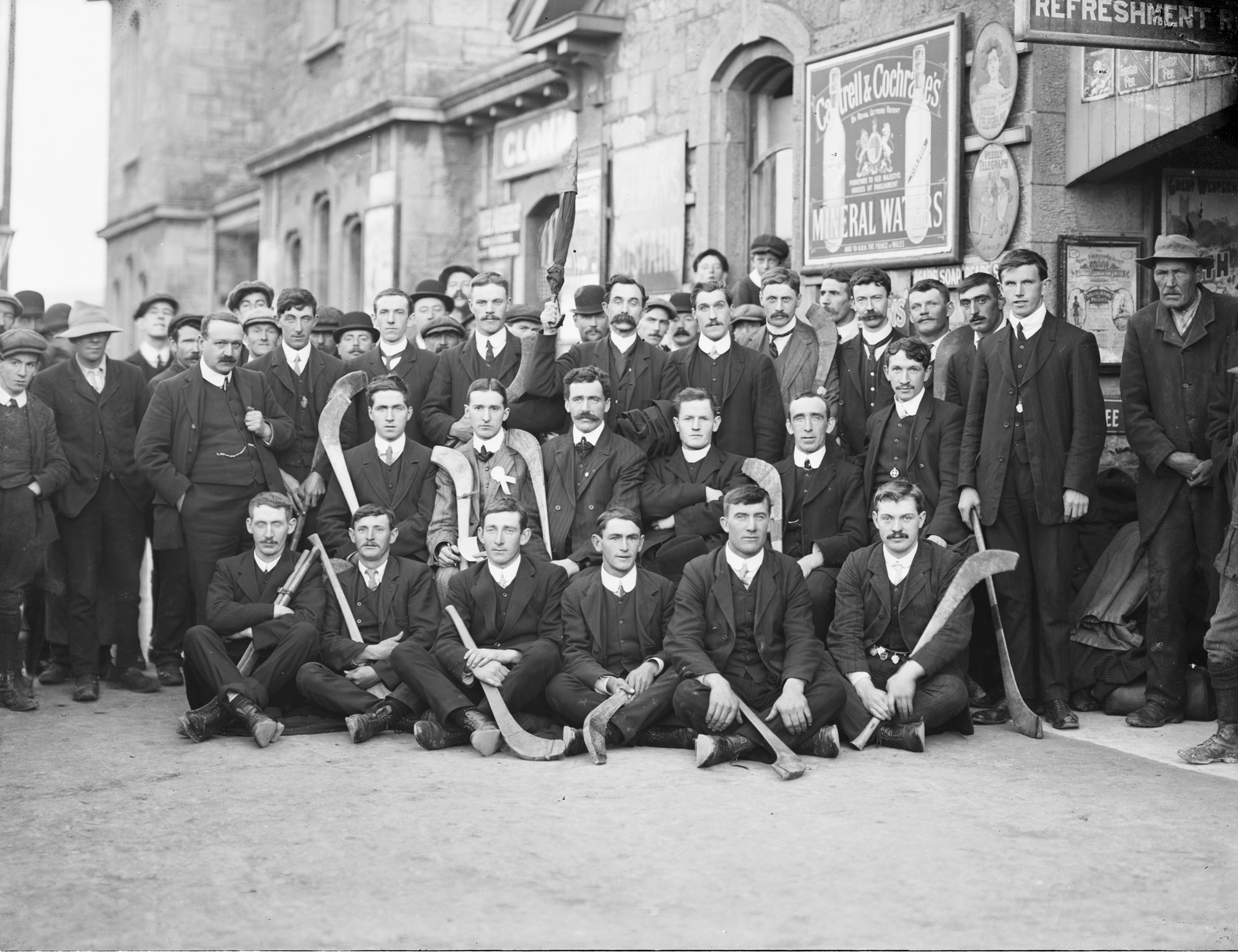
Tipperary Hurling Team outside Clonmel railway station, August 26, 1910

The teams of the Tipperary County Board, together with those of Kilkenny GAA and Cork GAA, lead the roll of honour in the All-Ireland Senior Hurling Championship (SHC). The Board's teams have won 29 All-Ireland SHC titles as of 2025; the third most successful of all county boards. Three teams also have the distinction of twice winning three consecutive All-Ireland finals (1898, 1899, 1900) and (1949, 1950, 1951). The team of the 1960s is considered the greatest of all Tipperary teams. The county's fortunes declined during the latter half of the twentieth century to the extent that only seven All-Ireland SHC titles were won in the period 1966–2019; however, new systems and extensive work at underage level brought SHC titles to Tipperary in 2010, 2016 and 2019, with old rival Kilkenny defeated in all three. As well as being victorious in four minor and three U21 All-Ireland hurling finals since 2006. For more detail on hurling history, see here.

Historically, the captain of the Tipperary senior hurling team for each season was decided by the club that won the preceding Tipperary Senior Hurling Championship. For example, Willie Ryan was the team captain for 2009, as chosen by his club Toomevara. This system, however, meant there was little consistency from year to year and often meant that the team captain was not an integral part of the team or even a first choice player (as in the Willie Ryan example). For the 2010 inter-county season the responsibility for choosing the captain of the senior team was given to the Tipperary management team, with Eoin Kelly from the Mullinahone club becoming the first captain selected under this system and Declan Fanning acting as vice-captain.

== Football ==
=== Clubs ===
Clubs contest the Tipperary Senior Football Championship. That competition's most successful clubs are Fethard and Clonmel Commercials, with 21 titles each.

=== County team ===
Tipperary won the All-Ireland Senior Football Championship (SFC) on four occasions: in 1889, 1895, 1900 and 1920. As the football championship is contested by a much larger number of teams than in hurling, success is hard won because of the high standard attained by many counties. For details on football history, see here.

== Camogie ==
Under Camogie's National Development Plan 2010–2015, "Our Game, Our Passion", five new camogie clubs were to have been established in the county by 2015. St Patrick's, Glengoole won the All Ireland senior club championship title in 1966 and 1967. Cashel won the All Ireland senior club championship title in 2007 and 2009.

From the late-1940s onwards, Tipperary's county team contested five unsuccessful All-Ireland SCC finals during Dublin's period of dominance in the game, also losing to Antrim in 1979. Tipperary won the inaugural National Camogie League (click on the year for teams) in 1976, and Tipperary then won the title for a second occasion in 2004. Tipperary's rapid progress to senior status (a junior title in 1992, then an intermediate title in 1997) was followed by five All-Ireland SCC titles in a six-year period between 1999 and 2004.

The 2007 season ended abruptly for Tipperary, an All-Ireland SCC semi-final exit meaning the team did not play in the All-Ireland SCC final for the first time since 1999. This marked the beginning the team's sudden decline, even more sudden than the progress of the previous decade, with the situation failing to improve in the years since then. McGrath succeeded Tony Delaney as Tipperary manager at the end of a 2007 that had finished then, by Tipperary's previous standards, in an early championship exit.

Bill Mullaney had a five-year spell as Tipperary senior camogie manager, from 2018 onwards. Mullaney brought Denis Kelly of Toomevara in as a coach–selector ahead of the 2021 season, joining Dinny Ferncombe, who had the same role. Kelly then succeeded Mullaney as Tipperary manager at the end of the 2022 season. Ahead of the 2024 season, Kelly was ratified for another year as senior camogie manager, while Mullaney took over as junior camogie manager when his predecessor Bill Sullivan moved to the Offaly intermediates. As of the 2024 season, the senior management team consisted of manager Denis Kelly of Borris–Ileigh, coach–selector Michael Ferncombe of Clonoulty–Rossmore, coach–selector Kevin Moran of Moycarkey–Borris, and selector Eamon Corcoran of Borris–Ileigh.

Liz Howard, the daughter of Limerick hurler Garrett Howard, is a former president of the Camogie Association.

Deirdre Hughes, who was played in the "full forward" position, was a member of "The Sligo Boyz".

Among the All-Ireland SCC winning captains for Tipperary were Jovita Delaney (2000 All-Ireland SCC-winning captain), Emily Hayden (2001 All-Ireland SCC-winning captain), Una O'Dwyer (2003 All-Ireland SCC-winning captain), and Joanne Ryan (2004 All-Ireland SCC-winning captain).

One Tipperary player, Deirdre Hughes, was included on the "team of the century". Other notable players include the Eimear McDonnell, who is a niece of Cork football manager Billy Morgan, the "butcher's daughter" Una O'Dwyer, Therese Brophy, an eight-time All-Ireland SCC finalist, with five All-Ireland SCC winners' medals, recipient of the seventh episode of Series 22 of Laochra Gael, Ciara Gaynor, and Biddy Phillips, who had many roles, including being involved when Tipperary won their first All Ireland camogie title in 1999. A Tipperary camogie player also died of pleurisy in 2025, at the age of 22.

Camogie All Star winners
Awards	Players
3	Claire Grogan
2	Jovita Delaney, Philly Fogarty
1	Úna O'Connor, Ciara Gaynor, Therese Brophy, Deirdre Hughes, Sinéad Millea, Julia Kirwan, Suzanne Kelley, Joanne Ryan, Patricia O'Halloran

== Ladies' football ==
Ladies' Football All Star winners
Awards	Players
2	Ann Maher, Lilian Gorey
1	Josie Stapleton, Marion O'Shea, Edel Hanly

== Handball ==
Tipperary have not just excelled or contested the team sports regularly, Tipp also have competed in the handball competitions. By winning Senior titles in both Senior Hardball and Softball singles, Tipp are the only county to have won an All-Ireland in every sport under the GAA except Rounders, in which there is no official Senior inter-county championship.

=== Hardball singles ===
Tipperary have won two All-Ireland Senior Hardball singles titles. These have been both won by Pat Hickey in 1966 and 1971. Tipp are currently 10th on the all time Hardball roll of honour, 11 titles behind 2nd place, 13-time winners Kilkenny and 15 times winners, 1st place Dublin

=== Hardball doubles ===
Tipperary have won eight All-Ireland Senior Hardball doubles titles. These were won in 1929, 1931, 1962, 1968, 1972, 1975, 1989 and 1995.

=== Softball singles ===
Tipperary have won three All-Ireland Senior Softball singles titles. These were won in 1948, 1950 and 1983. Tipp are currently 7th in the all time Softball roll of honour, 9 behind 12 times winners, 2nd place Dublin and way behind 25 times winners Kilkenny.

=== Softball doubles ===
Tipperary have won eight All-Ireland Senior Softball doubles titles. These were won in 1934, 1935, 1936, 1937, 1938, 1942, 1949 and 1950. Tipp are currently 3rd on the all time roll of honour, just 4 behind Kerry in second place with 12 and Kilkenny in first place, with 19.

=== 40x20 singles ===
Tipperary have won five All-Ireland Senior 40x20 Singles titles. They were won in 1981, 1982, 1983, 1993 and 1994.

=== 40x20 doubles ===
Tipperary won an All-Ireland Senior 40x20 Doubles title in 1991.

== Stadium information ==
- Name: Semple Stadium
- Town: Thurles
- Capacity: 55,500
- Inauguration: 1981
- Stand(s): Ardan O'Choinneain; Ardan O'Ríain
- Terrace(s): Killinan End; Town End

Also known as Thurles Sportsfield, re-developed in 1981 and renamed 'Semple Stadium' after Tom Semple, one of the famous Thurles Blues. The second biggest GAA stadium in Ireland.

== See also ==
- Kilfeacle and District RFC
