= Dublin GAA =

County board of the Gaelic Athletic Association in Ireland

- Irish: Áth Cliath
- Nickname(s): The Dubs; The Jacks; The Boys in Blue; The Liffeysiders; The Metropolitans
- Founded: 1886; 140 years ago
- Province: Leinster
- Dominant sport: Dual County
- Ground(s): Parnell Park, Donnycarney; Croke Park, Dublin
- County colours: Sky blue Navy

Clubs
- Total: 215
- SFC champions: Cuala
- SHC champions: Na Fianna

County teams
- NFL: Division 1
- NHL: Division 1B
- Football Championship: Sam Maguire Cup
- Hurling Championship: Liam MacCarthy Cup
- Ladies' Gaelic football: Brendan Martin Cup
- Camogie: O'Duffy Cup

The Dublin County Board of the Gaelic Athletic Association (GAA) (Irish: Cumann Luthchleas Gael Coiste Contae Átha Cliath) or Dublin GAA is one of the 32 county boards of the GAA in Ireland, and is responsible for Gaelic games in County Dublin and the Dublin county teams. The teams and their fans are known as "The Dubs" or "Boys in Blue". The fans have a special affiliation with the Hill 16 end of Croke Park.

The county football team is second to Kerry in its total number of wins of All-Ireland Senior Football Championship.

As of 2009, there were 215 clubs affiliated to Dublin GAA – the second highest, ahead of Antrim and Limerick, which each had 108.

== Governance ==
Dublin GAA has jurisdiction over the area of County Dublin. There are 9 officers on the Board, including the Cathaoirleach (chairperson), Mick Seavers, Vice-chairman, Ken O'Sullivan and Treasurer, Finbarr O'Mahony.

The Board is subject to the Leinster GAA Provincial Council.

=== Notable officers ===
The following members have also held notable positions in the GAA:

- James Boland, elected chairman of the Dublin County Committee in 1892, was the Dublin County representative on the Central Council the next two years. His son, Harry was elected chairman of the Dublin County Committee four times between 1911 and 1914.
- Tom Loftus, former chairman of the Dublin County Board was appointed Vice Chairman of the GAA Leinster Council (1969–1972) and later chairman of the GAA Leinster Council (1972–1974)
- Four men from the Dublin GAA organisation have served as president of the GAA:
  - Daniel McCarthy, 1921–1924
  - Seán Ryan, 1928–1932
  - Dr Joseph Stuart, 1958–1961
  - John Horan, 2018–2021

In addition, the politician John Bailey was chairman for 10 years.

=== Clubs ===
For details on the board's clubs, see this category and the list of Gaelic games clubs in Ireland#Dublin.

=== Restructuring ===
The GAA conducted a review of the structure of the Dublin GAA organisation in 2002 because of the huge population inequities and investigated the feasibility of dividing the County into more population-appropriate structures. Plans to divide Dublin into two teams – North Dublin and South Dublin – were proposed in 2002 but rejected by the Dublin County Board. Currently, the Board has only decided to divide its development teams. These teams are not considered to be a move towards dividing the county but are in fact a move designed to identify and develop young talent for the county as a whole. The restructured developments teams are North, South and West.

== Crest and symbols ==
In 2003/4, the Dublin County Board tried unsuccessfully to copyright the Dublin crest in use at the time. The crest at the time was declared to be in the public domain by the Irish High Court as it was too similar to other crests in use by Dublin City Council and other Dublin sports bodies. In line with other county boards and in order to prevent further loss of revenue, the county board designed a new crest drawing from the county's historical past which could be copyrighted and registered as a trademark.

The symbolism of the crest is three castles in flame which signifies the city of Dublin; a raven which signifies the county of Fingal; a Viking longboat which signifies the county of Dún Laoghaire-Rathdown; a book which signifies the county of South Dublin. The name Áth Cliath in Irish replaces the previous name "Dublin".

== Sponsorship ==
In October 2013, Dublin signed a new sponsorship deal with insurance firm AIG in excess of €4m over a five-year period. The deal would also incorporate ladies' football and camogie for the first time.

On 15 November Dublin announced that StayCity Aparthotels would be their primary sponsor, taking over from AIG who had sponsored the Dubs since 2013,

== Football ==
=== Clubs ===
The Dublin Senior Football Championship is an annual club competition between the top Dublin clubs. The winners of the Dublin Championship qualify to represent their county in the Leinster Championship and in turn, go on to the All-Ireland Senior Club Football Championship. The current (2024) Dublin County Champions are Cuala. They went on to win the 2025 All-Ireland Senior Club Football Championship. The first winners of the Dublin football championship were Erins Hope in 1887, who were the student club attached to St Patrick's Teacher Training College, Drumcondra. St Vincent's have won the most titles with a total of 26.

The Dublin Intermediate Football Championship is the second-tier football championship. The Intermediate champions go on to play in the Senior football Championship. The 2024 Dublin Intermediate County Champions are Naomh Mearnóg who became champions with a win over Clanna Gael Fontenoy. St Brigid's are the most successful intermediate club, having won on five occasions.

The Dublin Junior Football Championship is the tertiary football championship. This is split between JF1 and JFC2 for Clubs first teams. The 2024 JFC1 Champions are Craobh Chiaráin and the current JFC2 Champions are Beann Eadair

The Junior All County Championship is to cater for clubs additional teams.

Parnell Park and O'Toole Park hosts the majority of games in the Dublin club football championships.

=== County team ===
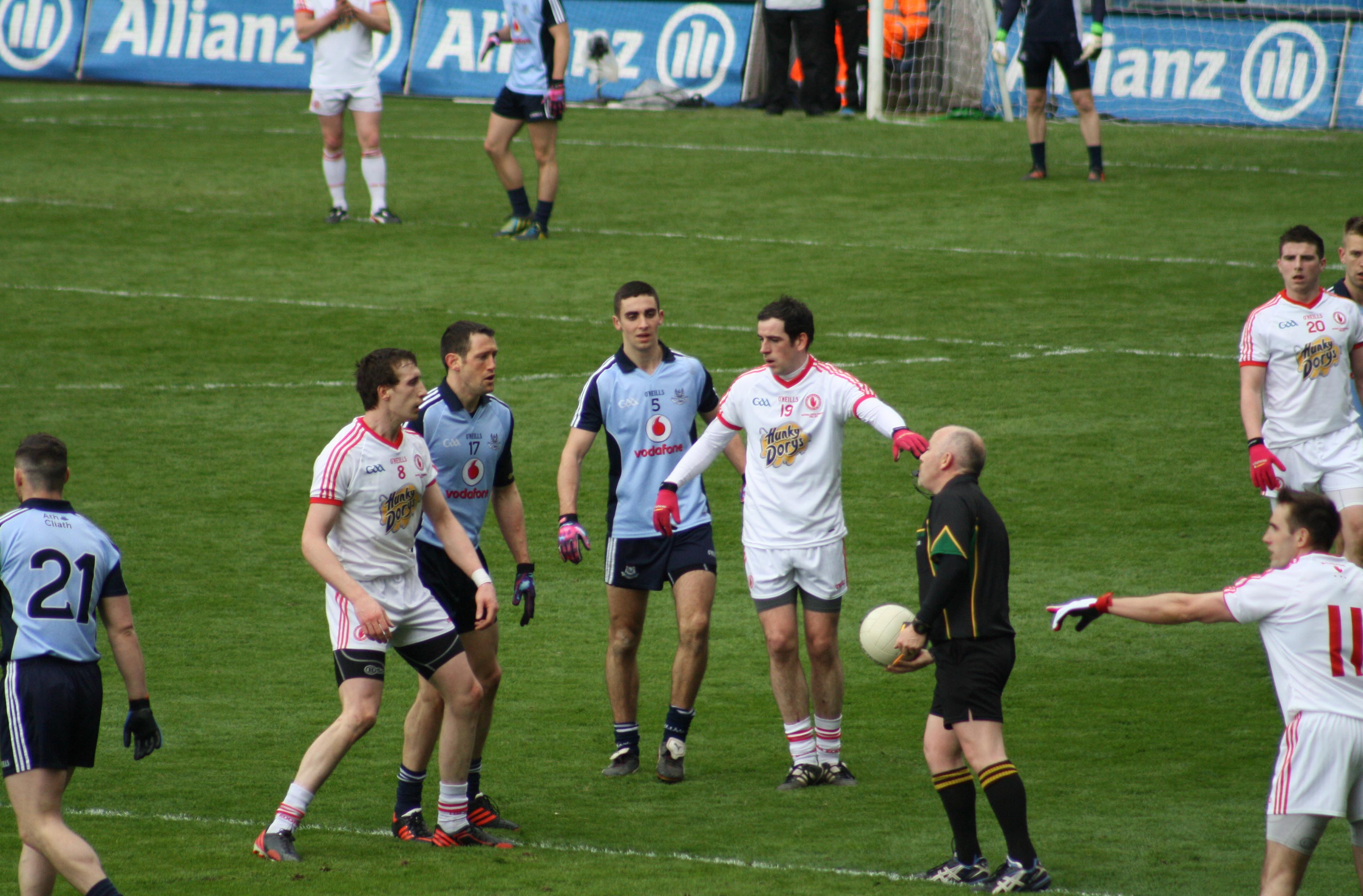
Dublin against Tyrone in the 2013 National Football League Final

Dublin first won the All-Ireland Senior Football Championship (SFC) in 1891 by defeating Cork by a margin of 2–1 to 1–1. It won the All-Ireland SFC the following year as well, with victory over Kerry.

The Dublin team of the 1970s won three All-Ireland SFCs (1974, 1976, 1977) and won seven Leinster Senior Football Championship (SFC) titles (six of which were consecutive). It was also the first team to play in six consecutive All-Ireland SFC finals (from 1974 to 1979), a feat later matched by Kerry in 2009. Several members of the 1970s era team also went on to win All-Ireland medals in 1983.

Dublin and Meath were involved in one of the most famous of Leinster championship encounters in 1991, the Dublin and Meath four-parter. The teams had to go to three replays in their Leinster SFC first-round match before a winner could be found. This series of games had the added factor of Dublin and Meath being long-time fierce rivals, a rivalry that intensified when Meath won four from the previous five Leinster SFCs and two All-Ireland SFCs over the previous five years, to replace Dublin as the strongest team in the province of Leinster. Meath eventually won the series, thanks to a last-minute goal scored by Kevin Foley, and a point scored by David Beggy, in the third replay. Foley took seven steps for the winning goal.

In the 2010s, Dublin won seven All-Ireland SFCs. Between 2015 and 2020, they won six consecutive SFCs (the 'six in a row'), the first team to achieve this feat.

On 25 March 2017, when beating Roscommon by 2–29 to 0–14 in a National League game at Croke Park, Dublin set a new record of playing 35 games in League and Championship without defeat. The previous record, held by Kerry, had stood for 84 years.

The three most significant historical achievements occurred in the years 2018, 2019 and 2020. Dublin set new records for both the county and on national levels. 2018 saw the Dublin footballers win a fourth consecutive All Ireland championship for the very first time in their proud counties’ history and in doing so equalling the feats of Wexford 1915 to 1918, Kerry 1929 to 1932 and Kerry once more from 1978 to 1981. 2019 was the year of two new national records set, beginning with a ninth provincial title followed by an unprecedented fifth All Ireland championship in succession. In doing so besting the attempts of Kerry in 1982, narrowly defeated by Offaly by 1–15 to 0–17. Then in 2020, Dublin broke their own provincial and national records by successfully defending its title for tenth consecutive season and successfully defending its sixth consecutive All Ireland victory. Dublin had the longest unbeaten run in the All Ireland Championship stretching from 31 August 2014 until 14 August 2021 spanning 2,541 days; 42 games plus 3 draws for a total of 45 games unbeaten.

== Hurling ==
=== Clubs ===
The Dublin Senior Hurling Championship is an annual club competition between the top Dublin clubs. The winners of the Dublin Championship qualify to represent their county in the Leinster Senior Club Hurling Championship and in turn, go on to the All-Ireland Senior Club Hurling Championship. The 2013 Dublin County Champions were Ballyboden St Enda's. The first winners of the Dublin hurling championship were Metropolitans in 1888. Faughs have won the most titles with a total of 31.

The (2013) champions of the Dublin Minor Hurling Championship are Ballyboden St Enda's. 2014 Champions were Croke's 2015 Champions were Cuala who were runners up in the Leinster Final 2016 Champions are Cuala who won the Leinster Final for the first time since Crumlin 79/80.Cuala also became the first Dublin Hurling Club to win the All Ireland Senior Club Hurling Championship, with back to back wins in 2017 and 2018

Parnell Park hosts all the major games in the Dublin club hurling championships.

=== County team ===
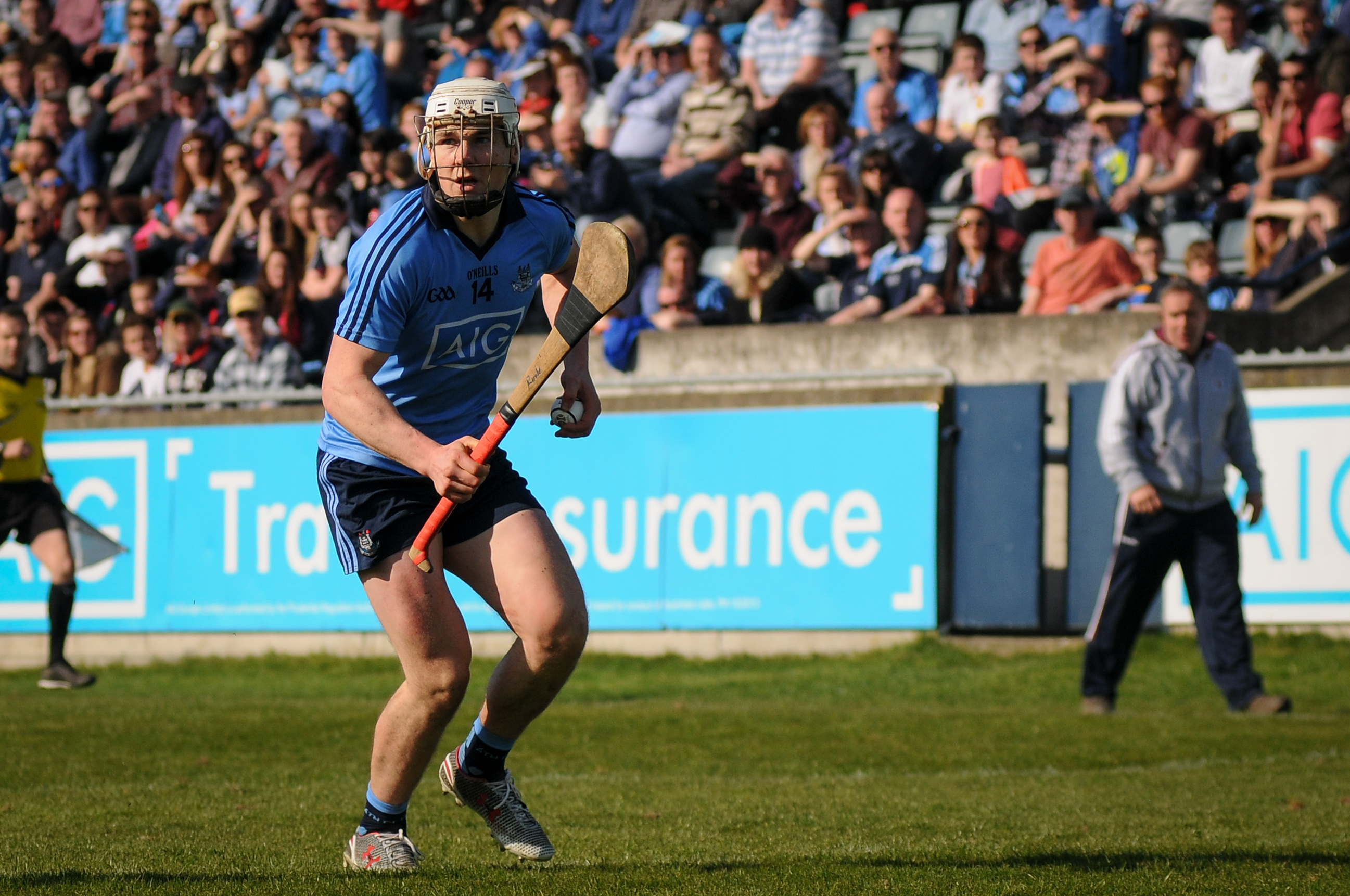
Liam Rushe in action for the Dublin hurlers against Galway in the Allianz Hurling League

Dublin's hurlers have failed to replicate the success of the county's football side, having won the Senior All-Ireland Hurling final on 6 occasions, most recently in 1938. In terms of All-Ireland titles, they are significantly behind hurling's big three of Kilkenny, Cork and Tipperary. Their six titles do however place them fifth in the overall winners' list, jointly tied with Wexford.

Dublin has won the Leinster Championship on 24 occasions, the second most Leinster titles of any side, although they remain well behind Kilkenny, who have won the Leinster Championship 70 times.

Dublin have won the National Hurling League three times: in 1929, 1939 and 2011. This places them joint seventh (with Clare) on the overall winners list, having won 16 fewer titles than top-ranked Tipperary.

In 2009, former Clare manager, Anthony Daly was appointed manager of Dublin. Under his management, Dublin contested the Leinster Final, but lost by 2 goals to Kilkenny.

Dublin won the National Hurling League in May 2011 after a 12-point win over Kilkenny, their first national title since they won the All Ireland in 1938.

On 7 July 2013, Dublin won the Leinster Final against Galway on a 2–25 to 2–13 scoreline, scoring 2–21 from play. This was the first time they had won the competition since 1961. The Goalkeeper from the 1961 team presented the Dublin Captain, Johnny McCaffrey, with the Bob O'Keefe trophy.

== Handball ==
=== Hardball Singles winners ===
Dublin has won the Senior hardball singles All-Ireland title on 15 occasions, two more than their nearest rivals Kilkenny. The 2005 All-Ireland senior hardball singles title was won by Dubliner Eoin Kennedy who plays his club handball for St Brigid's. Other former winners for Dublin are T. Soye and A. Clarke.

=== Softball Singles winners ===
Dublin has won the Senior softball singles on nine occasions, more than any county other than Kilkenny (who have twenty-five wins to date). The former winners for Dublin include M. Joyce 1925, W. McGuire 1927, L. Rowe 1947, 1949 and 1951, P. Ryan 1980 and E. Kennedy 2004, 2005 and 2006.

== Camogie ==
The structure of the women's field sport of camogie in Dublin was arguably the most successful in the country, and differed from its provincial counterparts. The league and championship were organised in the winter months, and weekly programmes of Dublin Senior Club Camogie League, Dublin Senior Club Camogie Championship and Isle of Man Cup matches were contested by clubs such as Austin Stacks, Celtic, CIE, Cuchulainns, Eoghan Ruadh, Jacobs, Muiris O'Neills, Naomh Aoife, and Optimists on a dedicated camogie ground in the Phoenix Park (first used 1922, reopened 1933, new pitch opened 1987) although Celtic had a ground in Coolock and CIE had a ground in Inchicore. This left Dublin camogie to concentrate on a summer closed season which contributed to its successes in the but led to difficulties when Dublin clubs began to compete in the provincial and All Ireland club championship in the 1960s. Although Celtic was the first winner of the All Ireland, the club did not compete the following year.

Three Dublin clubs won the All-Ireland Senior Club Camogie Championship in its early days: they were Austin Stacks, in 1971 and 1972; Eoghan Ruadh, in 1967, and Crumlin, in 1985. However, no Dublin club has won the competition since the 1980s.

Under Camogie's National Development Plan 2010–2015, "Our Game, Our Passion", five new camogie clubs were to be established in the county by 2015.

Dublin is the second most successful county in the women's field sport of camogie, Máire Gill and Máire Ní Chinnéide were notable early presidents of the Camogie Association. During the period from 1932 to 1966, the county had nearly one-third of the affiliated clubs in the Association and won all but eight of the championships it contested, winning a ten consecutively and an eight consecutively in a period interrupted only by a controversial 1956 All-Ireland semi-final defeat to Antrim. In a period of revival, the team won three National Camogie League titles between 1979 and 1983, as well as the 1984 All-Ireland Senior Camogie Championship. The total could have been greater had not Dublin County Board disaffiliated during two periods of unrest in the 1940s.

As of 2009, Peter Lucey was manager of the team. Denis Murphy, described as "a proper hurling man" and "a great man manager [who] will be able to get on well with the girls", was appointed as manager ahead of the 2011 season. Another former manager, PJ Donohue, was described as "one of the most successful managers in the sport". Former Kilkenny hurler David Herity quit as manager of the team in 2018. Frank Browne succeeded Herity as manager of the team later that year. It was while Browne was manager that the Dublin Camogie Board brought Dublin All-Ireland SFC winner Philly McMahon on board in agreement with Bedo7.

The 2020 management team resigned, shortly after news broke that three senior players had tested positive for COVID-19. John Treacy of Cuala managed the team until January 2021; then Adrian O'Sullivan, a native of Limerick, managed the team between 2021 and 2022. He resigned in frustration, after becoming disillusioned with the sport, saying: "The quality of officiating isn't up to standard either, or what you’d get in hurling. Even club hurling".

Paul Kelly, the Tipperary hurler, was appointed manager of the team on a three-year term in October 2022. Among the All-Ireland SCC winning captains for Dublin were Mary Walsh (1937), Emmy Delaney (1938), Peggy Griffin (1942 and 1943), Bríd Reid (1959, returning by air from her honeymoon in The Isle of Man), Doreen Brennan (1960), Gerry Hughes (1961 and 1962), and Anne Colgan (1984). Three Dublin players, K Mills, Duff O'Mahoney and Úna O'Connor, were named on a "team of the century".

== See also ==
- The Dubs: Dublin GAA since the 1940s
- Dublin county football team
