= 1942 All-Ireland Senior Camogie Championship =

Camogie championship

All-Ireland Senior Camogie Championship 1942
Winners
- Champions: Dublin (5th title)
- Captain: Peggy Griffin

Runners-up
- Runners-up: Cork
- Captain: Peggy Hogg

The 1942 All Ireland Camogie Championship was won by Dublin, beating Cork in a replayed final. Cork thought they had won the initial final at the Mardyke when Renee Fitzgerald scored first an equalising, then a late winning goal. Referee Sean Gleeson said he had blown the whistle before Fitzgerald's second goal. The replay was the first All Ireland final to have a match programme and the first to be broadcast by Radio Éireann.

== Final stages ==
In the All Ireland semi-finals Cork beat Galway 7–4 to 2–0 and Dublin beat Antrim 12–0 to 1–0. Cork had a goal disallowed in the last minute of the drawn final.

=== Final stages ===
Semi-Final

| Cork | 7–4 – 2–0 | Galway |

The Mardyke

Semi-Final

| Dublin | 12–0 – 2–0 | Antrim |

Dolphin's Barn

1942-10-25
Final
14:00 BST

| Dublin | 1–2 – 1–2 | Cork |

The Mardyke, Cork
Attendance: 4,000
Referee: Sean Gleeson Tipperary
1942-11-15
Replay
14:00 BST

| Dublin | 4–1 – 2–2 | Cork |

Croke Park, Dublin
Attendance: 4,000
Referee: Vera Campbell Antrim

| Dublin | Cork |

Dublin:
| GK | 1 | Maura O'Carroll (Scoil Brighde) |
| FB | 2 | Rose Martin (Austin Stacks) |
| RWB | 3 | Patricia Kenny ([Colaiste San Dominic Camogie Club|Col San Dominic]) |
| CB | 4 | Peggy Griffin (Col San Dominic) (captain) |
| LWB | 5 | Kathleen Kearns (Optimists) |
| MF | 6 | Eva Moran (Col San Dominic) |
| MF | 7 | Kathleen Cody GSR |
| MF | 8 | Kathleen Mills GSR |
| RWF | 9 | Īde O'Kiely (UCD) |
| CF | 10 | Rose Fletcher (Scoil Brighde) 1–0 |
| LWF | 11 | Doreen Rogers (Austin Stacks) (3–0) |
| FF | 12 | Maura Moore (Optimists) (1–0) |
Substitutes:
| MF | | Josie Kelly (UCD) for Eva Moran (substituted in) 20' |

Cork:
| GK | 1 | Peggy Hogg (captain) |
| FB | 2 | Joan Cotter |
| RWB | 3 | Maureen Cashman |
| CB | 4 | Mary Fitzgerald |
| LWB | 5 | Maureen Hegarty |
| MF | 6 | Mary Vallelly |
| MF | 7 | Kathleen Coughlan |
| MF | 8 | Kathleen Barry |
| RWF | 9 | Kitty Buckley (Old Aloysius) 1–2 |
| CF | 10 | Patty Hegarty |
| LWF | 11 | Eileen Casey 1–0 |
| FF | 12 | Renee Fitzgerald (Old Aloysius) |
Substitutes:
| MF | | Mona Hobbs for Kathleen Barry (substituted in) 35' |

Match Rules

- 50 minutes
- Replay if scores level
- Maximum of 3 substitutions allowable only if player was injured

== See also ==
- All-Ireland Senior Hurling Championship
- Wikipedia List of Camogie players
- National Camogie League
- Camogie All Stars Awards
- Ashbourne Cup

| Preceded by 1941 All-Ireland Senior Camogie Championship | All-Ireland Senior Camogie Championship; 1932–present | Succeeded by 1943 All-Ireland Senior Camogie Championship |
