= 1967 All-Ireland Senior Camogie Championship =

Camogie championship

All-Ireland Senior Camogie Championship 1967
Winners
- Champions: Antrim (5th title)
- Manager: Nancy Murray
- Captain: Sue Cashman

Runners-up
- Runners-up: Dublin
- Captain: Kathleen Lyons

The 1967 All-Ireland Senior Camogie Championship was the high point of the 1967 season in Camogie. The championship was won by Antrim who defeated Dublin by a four-point margin in the final, which went to a replay. It ended a remarkable record of 18 All Ireland titles in 19 years by Dublin, an eight-in-row 1948-‘55 and a ten-in-a-row 1957-’66.

== Season ==
Cork won the Munster championship and succumbed to five Antrim goals from Lily Scullion in the All Ireland semi-final.

== Final ==
The final took place in a downpour and resulted in a draw thanks to a late point by Sue Ward-Cashman. The replay was staged as a curtain-raiser to the Oireachtas Hurling Final between Kilkenny and Clare at Croke Park on 15 October, which attracted an attendance of 15,879. Agnes Hourigan wrote in the Irish Press:

Giving a truly spectacular exhibition of the game that drew round after round of applause from the appreciative Oireachtas crowd, Antrim deservedly won. Only for a brief three-minute period in the second half did they lose command of proceedings. In those three minutes the game took a really dramatic turn. Leading by seven points 2-8 to 0-7 and even against wind and elements, seemed cruising to victory with just ten minutes to go, the Antrim side were rocked back on their heels when goals by Kit Kehoe and Úna O'Connor followed by a neat point from Una, brought the sides level in an amazing two-minute spell. But the Antrim mentors quickly reacted to the challenge. They moved Eileen Collins to right wing and Mairéad Carabine to left forward and the change brought quick dividends. Three minutes later a great line ball by Sue Cashman was finished to the net by Mairéad Carabine for the decisive goal of the match. She scored again but this time the goal was disallowed for a square infringement and it was left to Marion McFetridge to clinch Antrim’s victory with a well taken point two minutes from time.

The winning team adjourned to the Old Sheiling in Raheny to celebrate their success. Their mascot was 10-month-old Paula McFetridge.

=== Final stages ===
13 August
Semi-Final

| Antrim | 5-7 – 2-2 | Cork |

The Mardyke

27 August
Semi-Final

| Dublin | 7-7 – 2-0 | Mayo |

Parnell Park

17 September
Final

| Antrim | 4-2 – 4-2 | Dublin |

Croke Park

15 October
Final Replay

| Antrim | 3-9 – 4-2 | Dublin |

Croke Park

=== Drawn Final 17 September Antrim 4-2 Dublin 4-2 ===
| Antrim | Dublin |

ANTRIM:
| GK | 1 | Teresa Kearns-Cassidy (Dunloy) |
| FB | 2 | Moya Forde (Ahoghill) |
| RWB | 3 | Ethna Dougan (Dunloy) |
| CB | 4 | Maeve Gilroy (St Malachy's Randalstown) |
| LWB | 5 | Kathleen Kelly (Moneyglass) |
| MF | 6 | Mairéad Carabine (St Teresa's Belfast) |
| MF | 7 | Sue Ward-Cashman (Deirdre) (Capt) (0-1) |
| MF | 8 | Mairéad McAtamney (Portglenone) |
| RWF | 9 | Marion McFetridge (St Malachy's Randalstown) (3-0) |
| CF | 10 | Mairéad Quinn (Creggan) |
| LWF | 11 | Eileen Collins (St Malachy's Randalstown) |
| FF | 12 | Lily Scullion (Ahoghill) (1-1). |

DUBLIN:
| GK | 1 | Eithne Leech (Celtic) |
| FB | 2 | Mary Ryan (Austin Stacks) |
| RWB | 3 | Kitty Murphy (Celtic) |
| CB | 4 | Ally Hussey (Celtic) |
| LWB | 5 | Kay Lyons (Eoghan Rua) (Capt) |
| MF | 6 | Mary Sherlock (Austin Stacks) (0-1) |
| MF | 7 | Patricia Timmins (Naomh Aoife) |
| MF | 8 | Orla Ní Síocháin (Austin Stacks) (1-1) |
| RWF | 9 | Kit Kehoe (Celtic) |
| CF | 10 | Anne McAllister (Austin Stacks) |
| LWF | 11 | Judy Doyle (CIÉ) (2-0) |
| FF | 12 | Úna O'Connor (Celtic (1-0) |

MATCH RULES

- 50 minutes
- Replay if scores level
- Maximum of 3 substitutions

=== Replay Oct 17 Antrim 3-9 Dublin 4-2 ===
| Antrim | Dublin |

ANTRIM:
| GK | 1 | Teresa Kearns-Cassidy (Dunloy) |
| FB | 2 | Moya Forde (Ahoghill) |
| RWB | 3 | Ethna Dougan (Dunloy) |
| CB | 4 | Maeve Gilroy (St Malachy's Randalstown) |
| LWB | 5 | Kathleen Kelly (Moneyglass) |
| MF | 6 | Mairéad Carabine (St Teresa's Belfast) (1-0) |
| MF | 7 | Sue Ward-Cashman (Deirdre) (Capt) (0-1) |
| MF | 8 | Mairéad McAtamney (Portglenone) (0-5) |
| RWF | 9 | Marion McFetridge (St Malachy's Randalstown) (0-1) |
| CF | 10 | Mairéad Quinn (Creggan) (1-0) |
| LWF | 11 | Eileen Collins (St Malachy's Randalstown) (1-0) |
| FF | 12 | Lily Scullion (Ahoghill) (0-2). |

DUBLIN:
| GK | 1 | Eithne Leech (Celtic) |
| FB | 2 | Mary Ryan (Austin Stacks) |
| RWB | 3 | Kitty Murphy (Celtic) |
| CB | 4 | Ally Hussey (Celtic) |
| LWB | 5 | Kay Lyons (Eoghan Rua) (Capt) |
| MF | 6 | Mary Sherlock (Austin Stacks) |
| MF | 7 | Patricia Timmins (Naomh Aoife) |
| MF | 8 | Orla Ní Síocháin (Austin Stacks) |
| RWF | 9 | Kit Kehoe (Celtic) (2-1) |
| CF | 10 | Anne McAllister (Austin Stacks) (1-0) |
| LWF | 11 | Judy Doyle (CIÉ) |
| FF | 12 | Una O'Connor (Celtic (1-1) |

MATCH RULES

- 50 minutes
- Replay if scores level
- Maximum of 3 substitutions

== See also ==
- All-Ireland Senior Hurling Championship
- Wikipedia List of Camogie players
- National Camogie League
- Camogie All Stars Awards
- Ashbourne Cup

| Preceded by All-Ireland Senior Camogie Championship 1966 | All-Ireland Senior Camogie Championship; 1932 – present | Succeeded by All-Ireland Senior Camogie Championship 1968 |
