= Kathleen Buckley =

Irish camogie player

Kitty Buckley
Personal information
- Native name: Caitlín Ní Bhuachalla (Irish)
- Born: County Cork, Ireland

Sport
- Sport: Camogie
- Position: forward
Clubs*
Years	Club	Apps (scores)
	Old Aloysius and UCC	?
Inter-county**
Years	County	Apps (scores)
	Cork	?
Inter-county titles
- All-Irelands: 4
- * club appearances and scores correct as of (16:31, 30 June 2010 (UTC)). **Inter County team apps and scores correct as of (16:31, 30 June 2010 (UTC)).

Kathleen 'Kitty' Buckley is a former camogie player, five time All Ireland senior medalist and captain of the All Ireland Camogie Championship winning team in 1941. In the final of that year, she scored a record six goals of Cork's seven. She had previously featured on All Ireland senior final panels in 1934 (as a substitute), 1935, 1936, 1939, and 1940.

== Career ==
With UCC, she won Ashbourne Cup medals in 1936 and 1937. She was a prolific goalscorer with both club and county, reportedly scoring nine goals for Cork in their 14–0 to 1–1 defeat of Clare in the first round of the championship on the week before Cusack Park, Ennis was opened in 1936, and scoring two goals in the All Ireland final of that year. She scored a goal in the 1938 final, in which Cork were beaten by Dublin, a further goal each in both the 1939 and 1940 finals when Cork beat Galway and in the 1942 replay when Cork lost to Dublin.

== Other sports ==
She played inter-provincial tennis for Munster.
