= 1965 All-Ireland Senior Camogie Championship =

Camogie championship

All-Ireland Senior Camogie Championship 1965
Winners
- Champions: Dublin (24th title)
- Captain: Kathleen Ryder

Runners-up
- Runners-up: Tipperary
- Captain: Ann Carroll

The 1965 All-Ireland Senior Camogie Championship was the high point of the 1965 season in Camogie. The championship was won by Dublin who defeated Tipperary by a 13-point margin in the final.

== Arrangements ==
Goals from Ann Carroll and Margo Loughnane gave Tipperary a 2-6 to 0-6 victory over Cork in the Munster final.

== Final ==
Two goals each from Kit Kehoe and Judy Doyle in the third quarter decided the outcome of the final. Agnes Hourigan, president of the Camogie Association, wrote in the Irish Press:

Four great goals flashed home in a decisive offensive early in the second half by the quick silver Dublin forwards ended Tipperary’s hopes of camogie honours in a spectacular and often thrilling All Ireland final.

== Date of Final ==
It marked an important departure in the history of the competition, the first time that the camogie final was given an established date on the calendar, being played in Croke Park on the Sunday after the All-Ireland final for men’s teams in hurling. Of the previous 34 finals, eight had been played in August, five had been played in September, 12 had been played in October, six in November, two in December and one the following July

=== Final stages ===
August 29
Semi-Final

Tipperary	8-5 – 0-0	Galway

Tuam Stadium

Semi-Final

Dublin	10-1 – 7-5	Antrim

Glenariffe

September 19
Final

Dublin	10-1 – 5-3	Tipperary

Croke Park

Dublin	Tipperary

DUBLIN:
GK	1	Eithne Leech (Celtic)
FB	2	Mary Ryan (Austin Stacks)
RWB	3	Bríd Keenan (Austin Stacks)
CB	4	Ally Hussey (Celtic)
LWB	5	Kay Lyons (Eoghan Rua)
MF	6	Mary Sherlock (Austin Stacks)
MF	7	Patricia Timmins (Naomh Aoife)
MF	8	Orla Ní Síocháin (Austin Stacks)
RWF	9	Kit Kehoe (Celtic) (3-0)
CF	10	Kay Ryder (Naomh Aoife) (Capt) (1-0)
LWF	11	Judy Doyle (CIÉ) (5-0)
FF	12	Úna O'Connor (Celtic) (1-1).

TIPPERARY:
GK	1	Sally Long (Glengoole) (substituted off) 45'
FB	2	Peg Moloney (Roscrea)
RWB	3	Anna Graham (Glengoole)
CB	4	Margaret Phelan (Elmville)
LWB	5	Mary Graham (Glengoole)
MF	6	Ann Carroll (Glengoole) (Capt) (2-1)
MF	7	Peggy Graham (Glengoole) (1-0)
MF	8	Brenie Moloney (Roscrea)
RWF	9	Margo Loughnane (Roscrea) (0-1)
CF	10	Katleen Griffin (Roscrea) (1-0) (substituted off) 16' (substituted in) 45'
LWF	11	Honor O'Flynn (Elmville) (0-1)
FF	12	Terry Griffin (Roscrea) (1-0).
Substitutes:
LCF		Maureen Hall (Elmville) for Griffin (substituted in) 16' (substituted off) 30'
LCF		Monica Ryan (Glengoole) for Hally (substituted in) 30'
LCF		Katleen Griffin (Roscrea) for Long (substituted in) 45'

Subs used: and.

MATCH RULES

- 50 minutes
- Replay if scores level
- Maximum of 3 substitutions

== See also ==
- All-Ireland Senior Hurling Championship
- Wikipedia List of Camogie players
- National Camogie League
- Camogie All Stars Awards
- Ashbourne Cup

Preceded by All-Ireland Senior Camogie Championship 1964	All-Ireland Senior Camogie Championship; 1932 – present	Succeeded by All-Ireland Senior Camogie Championship 1966
