= 1963 All-Ireland Senior Camogie Championship =

Camogie championship

All-Ireland Senior Camogie Championship 1963
Winners
- Champions: Dublin (22nd title)
- Captain: Úna O'Connor

Runners-up
- Runners-up: Antrim
- Captain: Sue Ward

The 1963 All-Ireland Senior Camogie Championship was the high point of the 1963 season in Camogie. The championship was won by Dublin who defeated Antrim by a 13-point margin in the final.

== Structure ==
Cork led Dublin 2-1 to 1-1 at half time in the All Ireland semi-final at The Mardyke then stretched their lead to 3-4 to 1-2, before Una O'Connor and Mary Sherlock responded with goals and Sherlock added an equalising point three minutes from the end. Three goals each from Judy Doyle and Una O'Connor and further goals from Mary Sherlock and Brid Keenan secured Dublin's place in the final on a day that Cork's train broke down en route to Dublin.

== Final ==
Two goals from Una O'Connor and a third from Bríd Keenan at the start of the second half secured the championship for Dublin. Agnes Hourigan wrote in the Irish Press:

The scoreline did scant justice to the see saw nature of the exchanges. Far greater craft, combination and cohesion in attack, together with a back line that made only one mistake in the full fifty minutes, despite long spells of Antrim pressure, gave Dublin the title after a scintillating game. At al times but more especially so in the second half, Antrim had as much if not more of the play than the victors but whereas the Dublin forwards scored from almost every possible opportunity, the Ulster champions blazed wide time and again when well placed. Una O’Connor, who won her tenth All Ireland medal, roamed well outfield from her normal full-forward post, and, too mobile for opposing full-back Moya Forde, distributed the bal magnificently to a brilliant pair of corner-forwards Judy Doyle and Bríd Keenan, whose well taken scores made all the difference.

=== Final stages ===
14 July
Semi-Final

Dublin	3-2 – 3-2	Cork

The Mardyke

21 July
Semi-Final Replay

Dublin	8-4 – 1-0	Cork

Parnell Park

Semi-Final

Antrim	4-6 – 1-3	Galway

Craughwell

17 December
Final

Dublin	7-3 – 2-5	Antrim

Croke Park

Dublin	Antrim

Dublin
GK	1	Concepta Clarke (Austin Stacks)
FB	2	Betty Hughes (CIÉ)
RWB	3	Sheila Ware (Eoghan Rua)
CB	4	Ally Hussey (Celtic)
LWB	5	Kay Lyons (Eoghan Rua)
MF	6	Maureen McEvoy (Presentation Terenure Pat)
MF	7	Mary Sherlock (Austin Stacks) (0-2)
MF	8	Mary Ryan (Austin Stacks)
RWF	9	Bríd Keenan (Austin Stacks) (3-0)
CF	10	Kay Ryder (Naomh Aoife)
LWF	11	Judy Doyle (CIÉ) (2-1)
FF	12	Úna O'Connor (Celtic) (Capt) (2-0)

Antrim
GK	1	Teresa Kearns (Dunloy)
FB	2	Moya Forde (Ahoghill)
RWB	3	Margo Kane (St Teresa's Belfast)
CB	4	Chris Hughes-O’Boyle (St Malachy's Randalstown)
LWB	5	Mairéad McAtamney (Portglenone)
MF	6	Betty Smith (Gael Uladh)
MF	7	Sue Ward (Deirdre) (Capt) (0-2)
MF	8	Leontia Carabine (St Teresa's Belfast) (0-1)
RWF	9	Marion Kearns (St Malachy's Randalstown) (1-0)
CF	10	Mary Phil Jameson (Ballycastle) (1-1)
LWF	11	Marie Laverty (Deirdre)
FF	12	Maeve Gilroy (St Malachy's Randalstown) (0-1).

MATCH RULES

- 50 minutes
- Replay if scores level
- Maximum of 3 substitutions

== See also ==
- All-Ireland Senior Hurling Championship
- Wikipedia List of Camogie players
- National Camogie League
- Camogie All Stars Awards
- Ashbourne Cup

Preceded by All-Ireland Senior Camogie Championship 1962	All-Ireland Senior Camogie Championship; 1932 – present	Succeeded by All-Ireland Senior Camogie Championship 1964
