= 1961 All-Ireland Senior Camogie Championship =

Camogie championship

All-Ireland Senior Camogie Championship 1961
Winners
- Champions: Dublin (20th title)
- Captain: Betty Hughes

Runners-up
- Runners-up: Tipperary
- Captain: Katleen Downes

The 1961 All-Ireland Senior Camogie Championship was the high point of the 1961 season in Camogie. The championship was won by Dublin who defeated Tipperary by a ten-point margin in the final.

== Championship ==
The practice of giving Dublin a bye into the Leinster final was ended in 1961 and they had to play Wexford in a first round championship match. Judy Doyle scored three goals for Dublin on her inter-county debut as Dublin beat Laois by 8–4 to 2–1 to win the Leinster title at Parnell Park. Judy Doyle scored another three goals for Dublin against Galway in the semi-final and Una O’Connor two. Tipperary defeated Cork by 3–0 to 0–1 to win the Munster title at Clonmel with two goals by Katleen Downes and a third by Katleen Griffin. Antrim missed their full back Moya Forde from the All Ireland semi-final, a factor in Tipperary's morale-boosting win in Casement Park during which Katleen Downes scored three goals, Tess Moloney two and Terry Cummins the sixth.

== Final ==
Tipperary trailed by just one point at half-time but lost by ten. Agnes Hourigan, president of the Camogie Association, wrote in the Irish Press:

Dublin kept the trophy because of their better team work and crafty combination and yet this was a game in which Tipperary were not far behind the victors. Tipperary were by far the longer strikers and in the first half their forward looked more dangerous but failed to combine. Just before the interval Katleen Downes left Tipperary supporters happy with a goal which left a point between the sides. Thought now against the wind, Dublin stretched the lead by 1–1 at the start of the second half. Although Tipp fought back, Dublin's teamwork now proved decisive. After Kathleen Mills had put Dublin on the way to victory with a goal, Judy Doyle negated a Tipp goal with a similar score for Dublin. Brídie Scully was Tipperary's star, playing first on the left wing, then switching to left back midway through the first half and ending up in her customary position of centre back in the second half.

== Kathleen Mills retires ==
It was Kathleen Mills last match for Dublin. Agnes Hourigan, president of the Camogie Association, wrote in the Irish Press:

Kathleen Mills, the most famed camogie player of all time, bade farewell to the game in a blaze of glory at Croke Park where she played a big part in Dublin's victory. Kathleen won her 15th All-Ireland medal, an achievement unequalled in any team tame. No wonder the crowd cheered the blonde winger from CIE club when, carrying the O’Duffy Cup, she was chaired by her teammates.

=== Final stages ===
July 16
Semi-Final

Dublin	5-2 – 0-5	Galway

Pearse Stadium

July 30
Semi-Final

Tipperary	6-3 – 3-3	Antrim

Casement Park

October 8
Final

Dublin	7-2 – 4-1	Tipperary

Croke Park

Dublin	Tipperary

DUBLIN:
GK	1	Eithne Leech (Celtic)
FB	2	Betty Hughes (Celtic) (Capt)
RWB	3	Nuala Murney (UCD)
CB	4	Ally Hussey (Celtic)
LWB	5	Nancy Timmins (CIÉ)
MF	6	Collette Nolan (Eoghan Rua)
MF	7	Kay Ryder (Naomh Aoife)
MF	8	Kathleen Mills (CIÉ) (1-0)
RWF	9	Mary Ryan (Austin Stacks) (1-0)
CF	10	Joan Kinsella (Civil Service) (1-1)
LWF	11	Judy Doyle (Celtic) (3-0)
FF	12	Úna O'Connor (Celtic) (1-1)

TIPPERARY:
GK	1	Maura Treacy (Elmville)
FB	2	Kitty Flaherty (Cahir)
RWB	3	Peg Moloney (Roscrea)
CB	4	Bridie Scully (Roscrea)
LWB	5	Katleen England (Roscrea)
MF	6	Terry Griffin (Roscrea)
MF	7	Terry Cummins (Roscrea)
MF	8	Phyllis Ryan (Elmville)
RWF	9	Tess Moloney (Roscrea) (2-0)
CF	10	Katleen Griffin (Roscrea)
LWF	11	Katleen Downe (Roscrea) (2-1)
FF	12	Brid McGrath (Cahir)

MATCH RULES

- 50 minutes
- Replay if scores level
- Maximum of 3 substitutions

== See also ==
- All-Ireland Senior Hurling Championship
- Wikipedia List of Camogie players
- National Camogie League
- Camogie All Stars Awards
- Ashbourne Cup

Preceded by All-Ireland Senior Camogie Championship 1960	All-Ireland Senior Camogie Championship; 1932 – present	Succeeded by All-Ireland Senior Camogie Championship 1962
