= 1962 All-Ireland Senior Camogie Championship =

Camogie championship

All-Ireland Senior Camogie Championship 1962
Winners
- Champions: Dublin (21st title)
- Captain: Betty Hughes

Runners-up
- Runners-up: Galway
- Captain: Sheila Tonry

The 1962 All-Ireland Senior Camogie Championship was the high point of the 1962 season in Camogie. The championship was won by Dublin who defeated Galway by a 14-point margin in the final.

== Season ==
Emer Walsh had two goals for Galway in their semi-final win over Cork. Dublin's semi-final win over Antrim was described as "lucky but deserved" as Dublin fought back from seven points behind at half-time. Una O'Connor, Judy Doyle and Patricia Timmins picked up two goals each and Marion Kearns and Maeve Gilroy responded, also with two goals each, and Mairead McAtamney and Breda Smyth scored a goal each. Writing about the Dublin-Antrim semi-final Pádraig Puirséil, husband of Camogie Association president Úna Uí Phuirséil/Agnes Hourigan, wrote in the Irish Press:

I have seen some stage of every All_ireland camogie championship ever played since the O'Duffy cup competition began in the 1932-'33 season but I cannot remember a more effective right wing than Antrim's Mairead McAtamney on Sunday last. Right had or left, whether the ball was on the ground or in the air, she looked the most accomplished player of the day. Her nearest rival was her team mate, right forward Marion Kearns who also gave a classic display.

.

== Final ==
Dublin led by 4–3 at half-time, their first goal coming from 15-year-old Patricia Timmins. Agnes Hourigan, president of the Camogie Association, wrote in the Irish Press:

While there could be no doubt whatever about the superiority of the winners, the game itself fell well below expectations. Close marking kept spectacular play to an absolute minimum while Dublin's pronounced superiority at midfield meant that, for three quarters of the game, the battle was almost entirely confined to a hard fought struggle between the Dublin forwards and the Galway backs. The western forwards, poorly served by their midfielders, had to travel far out for the ball and rarely troubled the Dublin defence, though it must be recorded in their favour that they did snatch the only two real chances they got, one in each half.

Galway's case in the final was not helped by the injury to their star defender Veronica Heneghan. The Connacht Tribune reported

Dublin who started firm favourites were more than a little surprised by the tenacity of the Galway girls, who fought all the way. There was always that lingering feeling that Galway may finish in front. Galway's twelve layers never gave an inch in a hard-hitting, hard-tackling and close-marking game. The fact that marking was so close that polished and spectacular play was reduced to an absolute minimum. Although the game was lacking in finesse, it was not lacking in excitement. The game held interest in the end and was always entertaining. Galway did not win, but their goalie, Eileen Naughton of St Mary's was the most outstanding player on the field. She gave a superb and first rate display. She let in five goals, but it must be remembered that, in spite of some bad coverage by the backs, she saved at least ten other scores. Eileen;s clearances brought round after round of applause from the crowd, the largest attendance ever at a camogie final.

=== Final stages ===
15 July
Semi-Final

Galway	3–1 – 1–4	Cork

Fermoy

22 July
Semi-Final

Dublin	6–4 – 6–2	Antrim

12 August
Final

Dublin	5–5 – 2–0	Galway

Croke Park

Dublin	Galway

DUBLIN:
GK	1	Eithne Leech (Celtic)
FB	2	Betty Hughes (CIÉ) (Capt)
RWB	3	Nuala Murney (UCD)
CB	4	Ally Hussey (Celtic)
LWB	5	Kay Lyons (Eoghan Rua)
MF	6	Kay Ryder (Naomh Aoife)
MF	7	Mary Sherlock (Austin Stacks)
MF	8	Mary Ryan (Austin Stacks) (0-2)
RWF	9	Patricia Timmins (Naomh Aoife) (1–0)
CF	10	Bríd Keenan (Austin Stacks) (0–1)
LWF	11	Judy Doyle (CIÉ) (3–1)
FF	12	Úna O'Connor (Celtic) (1–1)

GALWAY:
GK	1	Ellen Naughton (St Mary's)
FB	2	Pauline Colclough (St Mary's)
RWB	3	Rita Flaherty (Castlegar)
CB	4	Ronnie Heneghan (Castlegar) (substituted in) 36'
LWB	5	Sheila Tonry (Castlegar) (Capt)
MF	6	Kathleen Higgins (Athenry)
MF	7	Kay Quinn (Castlegar)
MF	8	Chris Conway-Furey (Castlegar)
RWF	9	Frances Fox (St Mary's)
CF	10	Kathleen Clancy (St Mary's) (1–0)
LWF	11	Kathleen Flaherty (Castlegar) (1-0)
FF	12	Emer Walsh (Castlegar)
Substitutes:
LCF		Bridie Newell (Castlegar) for Ronnie Heneghan (substituted in) 36'

MATCH RULES

- 50 minutes
- Replay if scores level
- Maximum of 3 substitutions

== See also ==
- All-Ireland Senior Hurling Championship
- Wikipedia List of Camogie players
- National Camogie League
- Camogie All Stars Awards
- Ashbourne Cup

Preceded by All-Ireland Senior Camogie Championship 1961	All-Ireland Senior Camogie Championship; 1932 – present	Succeeded by All-Ireland Senior Camogie Championship 1963
