= 1966 All-Ireland Senior Camogie Championship =

Camogie championship

All-Ireland Senior Camogie Championship 1966
Winners
- Champions: Dublin (25th title)
- Captain: Kathleen Ryder

Runners-up
- Runners-up: Antrim
- Manager: Nancy Murray
- Captain: Eileen McGrogan

Other
- Matches played: 2

The 1966 All-Ireland Senior Camogie Championship was the high point of the 1966 season in Camogie. The championship was won by Dublin who defeated Antrim by a two-point margin in the final. The semi-final between Dublin and Tipperary ranks alongside the disputed semi-final of 1947 between Dublin and Galway as the most controversial in camogie history.

== Controversy over the one-point victory ==
Most Tipperary people believed that the All Ireland semi-final between Tipperary and Dublin at Cahir had finished as a one-point victory for Tipperary, although because of a disputed point by Ann Carroll from a free eight minutes into the second half some others thought it was a draw. The referee said it was a one-point victory for Dublin. Tipperary appealed against the result but their objection failed and the referee's score of Dublin 5–0, Tipperary 3–5 was confirmed. Dublin had two goals each from Úna O'Connor and Kit Kehoe and a fifth from Judy Doyle while Tipperary had two goals from Katleen Griffin, 1-1 from Peggy Grahame (one of three sisters on the Tipperary side), three or four points (depending on your interpretation) from Ann Carroll and two points from and Margo Loughnane. Some of the Tipperary supporters acted in an unruly manner for which the county received a six-month suspended sentence. The Irish Press commented that the game was "The game was very fast and often spectacular but unfortunately was betimes robust.." The Irish Press reported

There was considerable confusion at the end of this tremendously exciting All Ireland camogie semi-final at Cahir yesterday and only after an emergency meeting of the central Council in the Galtee Hotel after the game was it announced by the President, Miss Lil O'Grady (Cork) that Dublin the holders had got through to yet another final, by a single point.

The Nenagh Guardian reported under the scoreline Tipperary 3-7 Dublin 5-0:

Elation, disappointment, despair, absolute exasperation, these are al the words that could be used to describe the feelings of the Tipperary camogie team after last Sunday's All Ireland semi-final against Dublin in Cahir. The excitement and the cheering when the referee announced after the game that Tipperary had own by a point was tremendous, and the exhausted Tipperary girls jumped for joy. But amid fantastic confusion there were doubts as to whether one of Tipperary's points had been allowed or not. Despite this disappointment that the game could possibly be a draw, the absolute bombshell that was dropped when it was announced in the Galtee Hotel that Dublin had won by a point really completed a day of frustration. That a referee in an All Ireland semi-final could forget to mark down scores of one of the team is really inexplicable. All the Tipperary girls and officials were simply stunned that such a thing could happen. It was like a nightmare come true. How the referee could change so quickly from Tipperary winning by one point to the impossibility of Dublin actually winning is beyond comprehension. Margo Loughnane coolly tapped over the equalizer and seconds before the final whistle, Ann Carroll pointed to break the Dublin bogey for Tipperary camogie players for ever, no mater what the referee says. It was their tremendous spirit and determination that brought Tipperary to victory in the end. They moved as a unit with one purpose in mind, and even a deficit of eight points did not deter them from attaining the purpose, and they succeeded as far as flagged scored were concerned.

== Final ==
A goal in the second minute from Úna O'Connor, winning her 13th All-Ireland medal, put Dublin on course to victory, they led 1-1 to 0-2 at half time. Antrim leveled with two Mairéad McAtamney points five minutes after the restart. Orla Ní Síocháin put Kit Kehoe in possession for what proved to be the decisive goal for Dublin 12 minutes from the end. Antrim besieged the Dublin goal at the end and Mairéad Carabine scored a point then doubled on a falling ball to send it inches over the crossbar when a goal would have earned a replay. Agnes Hourigan, president of the Camogie Association, wrote in The Irish Press:

The game was one of the most exciting in recent years, If Mairéad Carabine, who scored Antrim’s last point, had kept the ball low, the sides would have finished level. Dublin just deserved to snatch victory as they wasted few chances. They were filed on many occasions by goalkeeper Theresa Kearns, who had a brilliant game for Antrim. Antrim had more of the play and must regret their wasted chances. They had 12 wides in the second half and 16 in all, against five for Dublin. Dublin owe a great deal to their defence. Eithne Leech was always sound in goal, and Kathleen Lyons and Mary Ryan were seldom beaten. Kitty Murphy had a brilliant first half but was less conspicuous after the interval when Mary Phil Jameson moved out.

Kathleen Ryder made her last appearance for Dublin as she got married and retired from inter county camogie the following month.

=== Final stages ===
August 14
Semi-Final

Antrim	4-4 – 3-0	Galway

Ballinasloe

August 21
Semi-Final

Dublin	5-0 – 3-5	Tipperary

Cahir

September 18
Final

Dublin	2-2 – 0-6	Antrim

Croke Park

Dublin	Antrim

DUBLIN:
GK	1	Eithne Leech (Celtic)
FB	2	Mary Ryan (Austin Stacks)
RWB	3	Bríd Keenan (Austin Stacks)
CB	4	Kitty Murphy
LWB	5	Kay Lyons (Eoghan Rua)
MF	6	Mary Sherlock (Austin Stacks)
MF	7	Kay Ryder (Naomh Aoife)
MF	8	Orla Ní Síocháin (Austin Stacks)
RWF	9	Kit Kehoe (Celtic) (1-0)
CF	10	Anne McAllister
LWF	11	Judy Doyle (CIÉ)
FF	12	Úna O'Connor (Celtic (1-2)

ANTRIM:
GK	1	Theresa Kearns
FB	2	Moya Forde
RWB	3	Ethna Dougan
CB	4	Maeve Gilroy
LWB	5	Kathleen Kelly
MF	6	Betty Smith
MF	7	Mairéad Quinn
MF	8	Mairéad McAtamney (0-4)
RWF	9	Mairéad Carabine (0-2)
CF	10	Margaret Finn
LWF	11	Eileen McGrogan
FF	12	Mary Phil Jameson.

MATCH RULES

- 50 minutes
- Replay if scores level
- Maximum of 3 substitutions

== See also ==
- All-Ireland Senior Hurling Championship
- Wikipedia List of Camogie players
- National Camogie League
- Camogie All Stars Awards
- Ashbourne Cup

Preceded by All-Ireland Senior Camogie Championship 1965	All-Ireland Senior Camogie Championship; 1932 – present	Succeeded by All-Ireland Senior Camogie Championship 1967
