= 1934 All-Ireland Senior Camogie Championship =

Camogie championship

All-Ireland Senior Camogie Championship 1934
Championship details
- Dates: N/A – 28 October 1934

All-Ireland champions
- Winners: Cork (1st win)
- Captain: Kate Dunlea

All-Ireland runners-up
- Runners-up: Louth
- Captain: Rose Quigley

The 1934 All-Ireland Senior Camogie Championship was the high point of the 1934 season in Camogie. The championship was won by Cork, who defeated Louth by an eight-point margin in the final.

== Structure ==
After two championships had been run on an open draw basis, provincial championships were introduced in 1934, Cork defeated Limerick, Kerry and Waterford to win the Munster championship, Louth defeated Laois (6–4 to nil), Dublin, Kilkenny and Meath to claim the Leinster title, Galway and Antrim won their first provincial championships.

== Final ==
Kathleen Hanratty had already acquired the nickname as camogie's Lory Meagher by the time the final was played, "her rising and striking was a treat to witness" The Irish Press reported, commenting she was the most skilled player on the field. Cork had an early goal from a 25 by Kitty McCarthy to take a 1–2 to 0–2 half time lead, Betty Riordan and Kate Dunlea (var. Kathleen Delea) added Cork goals early in the second half.

Máire Ní Cheallaigh wrote in The Irish Press:

Yesterday at Croke Park 3,000 spectators were treated to a high class game which never lost interest to the end. The teams played with great dash and though Louth were the more spectacular, Cork were better strikers and had a sound forward line.

== Presentation ==
After the match Agnes O'Farrelly presented the O'Duffy Cup to Cork and William O'Reilly of the New Ireland Assurance Company presented the Leinster Cup to Louth. The 15-year-old Betty Riordan was the youngest player to win an All-Ireland senior medal.

== Aftermath ==
Cork forward Mary Kenneall was a sister of John Kenneally, who won an All-Ireland senior hurling medal in 1929.

== Championship results ==
=== Final stages ===
September 9
Semi-Final

Cork	4–1 – 2–0	Antrim

Croke Park

September 16
Semi-Final

Louth	2–3 – 2–1	Galway

Darver

October 28
Final

Cork	4–3 – 1–4	Louth

Croke Park

Cork	Louth

Cork:
GK	1	Nora Clarke
FB	2	Monica Cotter
RWB	3	Essie Staunton
CB	4	Lena Delaney
LWB	5	Kitty McCarthy (1–2)
MF	6	Monie O'Hea
MF	7	Lil Kirby
MF	8	May McCarthy
RWF	9	Kate (Kathleen) Dunlea (Capt) (2–0)
CF	10	Mary Kenneall
LWF	11	Betty Riordan (1–1)
FF	12	Josie McGrath

Louth:
GK	1	Sarah McGuinness Darver
FB	2	Nan Hanratty Darver
RWB	3	Mary McArdle Darver
CB	4	Bridget McKeown https://web.archive.org/web/20140208092728/http://www.joesgfc.com/ Darver]
LWB	5	Aggie McCluskey Darver
MF	6	Kathleen Johnson Knockbridge
MF	7	Mary McKeever https://web.archive.org/web/20140208092728/http://www.joesgfc.com/ Darver]
MF	8	Rose Quigley Darver (Capt)
RWF	9	Nellie McDonnell Darver
CF	10	Kathleen Hanratty Darver (0–3)
LWF	11	Bridie Donnelly Knockbridge (1–0)
FF	12	Mary Murtagh Darver (0–1).

Match Rules

- 50 minutes
- Replay if scores level
- Maximum of 3 substitutions

== See also ==
- All-Ireland Senior Hurling Championship
- Wikipedia List of Camogie players
- National Camogie League
- Camogie All Stars Awards
- Ashbourne Cup

Preceded by All-Ireland Senior Camogie Championship 1933	All-Ireland Senior Camogie Championship; 1932–present	Succeeded by All-Ireland Senior Camogie Championship 1935
