= 1958 All-Ireland Senior Camogie Championship =

Camogie championship

All-Ireland Senior Camogie Championship 1958
Winners
- Champions: Dublin (17th title)
- Manager: Nell McCarthy
- Captain: Kathleen Mills

Runners-up
- Runners-up: Tipperary
- Manager: Brenie Sands
- Captain: Alica Hanley

The 1958 All-Ireland Senior Camogie Championship was the high point of the 1958 season in Camogie. The championship was won by Dublin who defeated Tipperary by a 15-point margin in the final.

== Championship ==
Tipperary were trained by 1930s hurler Bernard Sands. Mary England Katleen Downes, Katleen Griffin (two each), Edie Merrigan and Breda Scully scored in Tipperary's dramatic eight goals to 5-1 semi-final victory over Antrim at Roscrea. The match produced such a high standard of hurling that the spectators were applauding for most of the game, The Nenagh Guardian reported. Galway described the semi-final encounter as its biggest ever camogie fixture.

== Final ==
The final was played after the Tipperary v Kilkenny hurling semi-final with some 6–7,000 of the 53,357 attendance staying on to view the camogie match. Financial restraints prevented Tipperary from booking into a hotel and so players had made their own way to Dublin and some had stayed overnight with relatives. They took the lead with a goal from Katleen Downes in the first minute of the game. from the tenth minute Dublin asserted their dominance. Mitchel Cogley wrote in the Irish Independent:

Tipperary flattered only to deceive for the opening ten minutes and even allowing for a couple of fine efforts later on, they were defending for most of the game. For once Kathleen Mills did not display her general all-round ability, but as a contribution to winning her 13th All-Ireland medal she scored a wonder goal which must rank as the greatest ever seen. From fully 45 yards out on the sideline, the CIE club girl with deadly accuracy gave Cathleen Carroll no chance. Dublin's strength lay in the ability of Kathleen Ryder and Una O'Connor to make the most of their chances against a Tipperary defence that put in extremely hard work for a major portion of the second half. Cathleen Carroll, the Roscrea girl who kept goal for Tipperary played well and added to the numerous goalmouth thrills by bringing off a couple of freakish saves.

=== Final stages ===
July 13
Semi-Final

Dublin	5-4 – 0-1	Galway

Pearse Stadium

July 20
Semi-Final

Tipperary	8-0 – 5-1	Antrim

Roscrea

August 10
Final

Dublin	5-4 – 1-1	Tipperary

Croke Park

Dublin	Tipperary

DUBLIN:
GK	1	May Kavanagh (Col San Dominic)
FB	2	Betty Hughes (CIÉ)
RWB	3	Doris Nolan (Celtic)
CB	4	Doreen Brennan (UCD)
LWB	5	Kay Lyons (Celtic)
MF	6	Bríd Reid (Austin Stacks)
MF	7	Anette Corrigan (UCD) (0-2)
MF	8	Kathleen Mills (CIÉ) (Capt) (2-0)
RWF	9	Mary O'Sullivan (Civil Service)
CF	10	Kay Ryder (Naomh Aoife) (1-0)
LWF	11	Annie Donnelly (UCD) (0-1)
FF	12	Úna O'Connor (Celtic) (2-1)

TIPPERARY:
GK	1	Catherine Carroll (Roscrea)
FB	2	Kitty Flaherty (Cahir)
RWB	3	Peg Moloney (Roscrea)
CB	4	Katleen England (Roscrea)
LWB	5	Bridie Scully (Roscrea)
MF	6	Terry Griffin (Roscrea)
MF	7	Alica Hanley (Cahir)
MF	8	Mary England (Roscrea) (0-1)
RWF	9	Edie Merrigan (Sean Treacy's Hollyford)
CF	10	Mary O'Neill (Newcastle)
LWF	11	Katleen Downes (Roscrea) (1-0)
FF	12	Katleen Griffin (Roscrea)

MATCH RULES

- 50 minutes
- Replay if scores level
- Maximum of 3 substitutions

== See also ==
- All-Ireland Senior Hurling Championship
- Wikipedia List of Camogie players
- National Camogie League
- Camogie All Stars Awards
- Ashbourne Cup

Preceded by All-Ireland Senior Camogie Championship 1957	All-Ireland Senior Camogie Championship; 1932 – present	Succeeded by All-Ireland Senior Camogie Championship 1959
