= 1957 All-Ireland Senior Camogie Championship =

Camogie championship

All-Ireland Senior Camogie Championship 1957
Winners
- Champions: Dublin (16th title)
- Manager: Nell McCarthy
- Captain: Eileen Duffy

Runners-up
- Runners-up: Antrim
- Captain: Maeve Gilroy

Other
- Matches played: 2

The 1957 All-Ireland Senior Camogie Championship was the high point of the 1957 season in camogie. The championship was won by Dublin who defeated Antrim by a two-point margin in the final thus gaining revenge for Antrim's semi-final victory of the previous year that interrupted would have been a sequence of 19 All-Ireland championships in a row by Dublin.

== Structure ==
Dublin's surprise semi-final defeat in the 1956 semi-final might well have been followed by an even more surprising defeat to Wicklow in the Leinster final at Parnell Park on August 11, 1957. Dublin found themselves a point behind, 1-1 to 1-0 with six minutes remaining before a goal by Úna O'Connor and points from Phyllis Campbell and Mary O'Sullivan gave them a 2-3 to 1-1 victory. Antrim also had to come from behind against Mayo in the All Ireland semi-final. With time running out and trailing by a point, Antrim moved Maeve Gilroy to centre-forward. Her subsequent goal ensured a place in the final. Cork defeated Tipperary by 4-5 to 3-4 in the Munster final at Roscrea despite three goals from Mary England.

== The Final ==
The final may have been the greatest in the 12-a-side phase of the history of camogie. There were less than two minutes left when Bríd Reid scored Dublin's winning goal in the final. The goal came from an Una O'Connor pass and happened immediately after Eilish Camphill had gone off injured and The Irish News reported “Antrim looked unsettled at this stage.” Antrim led 2-3 to 0-2 at half-time. Maureen Cairns had met a dropping ball and sent straight to the net to give Antrim a four-point lead with ten minutes to go. Anne Donnelly scored a goal and Kathleen Mills cut the Antrim lead to one with a point, before Reid struck for the winner. The attendance was 7,000.

Agnes Hourigan wrote in The Irish Press:

Just before yesterday’s camogie final some unknown admirer presented Dublin midfielder Annette Corrigan with a four leafed clover. And if ever a lucky charm worked overtime, that clover-leaf must have done so. Dublin who had been training behind Antrim right from the start, snatched their 16th All-Ireland title from a snap goal against the run of play two minutes from time. Antrim came storming back but were foiled by Dublin goalie Eileen Duffy whose last-second save of a glorious shot from Marion Kearns was a fitting climax to a glorious hour.

The Irish Independent reported:

The Antrim team made a gallant bid to hold their crown and were foiled only by the grand display of the Dublin goalkeeper and captain, Eileen Duffy.

Agnes Hourigan continued in The Irish Press:

Eileen Duffy was the star and inspiration of the Dublin team. Several of her first half saves were almost uncanny while in the closing stages she made several profitable dashes outfield.

Eileen Duffy was accorded the Irish Independent sports star of the week for her performance. Early in the game she had performed a wonderful triple save, claimed by Agnes Hourigan as one of the best sequential saves in the history of the game, when Antrim were leading by 1-1 to nil at the start of the match. At this stage two or three Antrim scores which appeared to be points were signalled wide by the umpires to the disappointment of the Antrim supporters.

=== Final stages ===
Aug 18
Semi-Final

Antrim	2-1 – 1-2	Mayo

MacHale Park

September 8
Semi-Final

Dublin	5-4 – 1-3	Cork

Parnell Park

October 6
Final

Dublin	3-3 – 3-1	Antrim

Croke Park

Dublin	Antrim

DUBLIN:
GK	1	Eileen Duffy (Celtic) (Capt)
FB	2	May Kavanagh (Col San Dominic)
RWB	3	Doris Nolan (Celtic)
CB	4	Doreen Brennan (UCD)
LWB	5	Kay Lyons (Celtic) (substituted off) 45'
MF	6	Bríd Reid (Austin Stacks) (1-0)
MF	7	Annette Corrigan (UCD) (0-2)
MF	8	Kathleen Mills (CIÉ) (0-1)
RWF	9	Maura Murphy (1-0)
CF	10	Mary O'Sullivan (Civil Service) (substituted off) 30'
LWF	11	Annie Donnelly (UCD) (1-0)
FF	12	Betty Hughes (CIÉ)
Substitutes:
CF		Úna O'Connor (Celtic) for O'Sullivan (substituted in) 30'
LWB		Brid Shannon for Lyons (substituted in) 45'

ANTRIM:
GK	1	Teresa Kearns
FB	2	Moya Forde
RWB	3	Agnes Dillon
CB	4	Winnie Kearns
LWB	5	Deirdre O'Gorman
MF	6	Eilis McCamphill (1-0) (substituted off) 45'
MF	7	Madge Rainey
MF	8	Maeve Gilroy (Capt) (1-1)
RWF	9	Marion Kearns (1-0)
CF	10	Margo Kane
LWF	11	Chris Hughes
FF	12	Frances Forde
Substitutes:
MF		C Cairns for Campbell (substituted in) 45'

MATCH RULES

- 50 minutes
- Replay if scores level
- Maximum of 3 substitutions

== See also ==
- All-Ireland Senior Hurling Championship
- Wikipedia List of Camogie players
- National Camogie League
- Camogie All Stars Awards
- Ashbourne Cup

Preceded by 1956 All-Ireland Senior Camogie Championship	All-Ireland Senior Camogie Championship; 1932–present	Succeeded by 1958 All-Ireland Senior Camogie Championship
