= Marie O'Gorman =

Irish camogie player

Personal information
- Native name: Máire Ní Ghormáin (Irish)
- Born: County Antrim, Ireland

Sport
- Sport: Camogie
Club*
Years	Club	Apps (scores)
	Deirdre	?
Inter-county**
Years	County	Apps (scores)
	Antrim	?
- * club appearances and scores correct as of (16:31, 30 June 2010 (UTC)). **Inter County team apps and scores correct as of (16:31, 30 June 2010 (UTC)).

Marie O'Gorman is a former camogie player, captain of the All Ireland Camogie Championship winning team in 1945.

== 1945 final ==
The final was played at Cappoquin, at a time both Cork and Dublin were suspended by camogie central council.

== Presentation ==
Prior to the 1945 final she exchanged gifts with her Waterford counterpart Biddy McGrath, receiving a box of chocolates and presenting a pound of tea, reflecting war-time shortages in the two jurisdictions. The O'Duffy Cup was not presented as Dublin, in dispute with the Camogie Association, had not returned it.
