= 2021 All-Ireland Senior Camogie Championship =

Gaelic games season

All-Ireland Senior Camogie Championship 2021
Championship details
- Dates: 17 July – 12 September 2021
- Teams: 12

All-Ireland champions
- Winners: Galway (4th win)
- Captain: Sarah Dervan
- Manager: Donal O'Rourke

All-Ireland runners-up
- Runners-up: Cork
- Captain: Linda Collins
- Manager: Paudie Murray

Championship statistics
- Matches played: 25

The 2021 All-Ireland Senior Camogie Championship was the premier inter-county competition of the 2021 camogie season.

The winners received the O'Duffy Cup. Galway defeated Cork in the final to claim their 4th title.

== Teams ==
Twelve county teams competed in the Senior Championship. 22 lower-ranked county teams competed in the Intermediate and Junior Championships.

== Format ==
Group stage

The twelve teams were drawn into three group, each containing four teams. Each team played each other team in its group once. Two points were awarded for a win and one for a draw.

Knock-out stage

The runners-up in groups 1, 2 and 3 and the winners of one group played in the quarter-finals. The other 2 group winners got a bye to the semi-final stage.

The bottom team in each group had to play-off to decide the team relegated to the Intermediate Championship.

== Group stage ==
Group games took place between 17 July and 1 August.

Key to colours
Advance to semi-finals
Advance to quarter-finals
Relegation playoff

=== Group 1 ===
Team	Pld	W	D	L	Diff	Pts
Tipperary	3	3	0	0	+38	6
Wexford	3	2	0	1	0	4
Limerick	3	1	0	2	-12	2
Offaly	3	0	0	3	-26	0

17 July 2021; 14:30; Group stage Round 1	Limerick	1-13 (16) (18) 2-12	Wexford	Newcastle West; Referee: Liz Dempsey
17 July 2021; 14:30; Group stage Round 1		Report		Newcastle West; Referee: Liz Dempsey

18 July 2021; 14:30; Group stage Round 1	Offaly	1-12 (15) (32) 3-23	Tipperary	St Rynagh's, Banagher; Referee: Philip McDonald
18 July 2021; 14:30; Group stage Round 1		Report		St Rynagh's, Banagher; Referee: Philip McDonald

24 July 2021; 14:30; Group stage Round 2	Wexford	4-10 (22) (15) 0-15	Offaly	Wexford Park; Referee: Ray Kelly
24 July 2021; 14:30; Group stage Round 2		Report		Wexford Park; Referee: Ray Kelly

25 July 2021; 14:00; Group stage Round 2	Tipperary	2-20 (26) (14) 1-11	Limerick	Nenagh Éire Óg; Referee: Justin Heffernan
25 July 2021; 14:00; Group stage Round 2		Report		Nenagh Éire Óg; Referee: Justin Heffernan

31 July 2021; 14:00; Group stage Round 3	Offaly	2-09 (15) (17) 0-17	Limerick	St Rynagh's, Banagher; Referee: Justin Heffernan
31 July 2021; 14:00; Group stage Round 3		Report		St Rynagh's, Banagher; Referee: Justin Heffernan

1 August 2021; 14:00; Group stage Round 3	Tipperary	4-11 (23) (14) 1-11	Wexford	Semple Stadium, Thurles; Referee: Andy Larkin
1 August 2021; 14:00; Group stage Round 3		Report		Semple Stadium, Thurles; Referee: Andy Larkin

=== Group 2 ===
Team	Pld	W	D	L	Diff	Pts
Cork	3	3	0	0	+27	6
Waterford	3	2	0	1	+7	4
Dublin	3	1	0	2	-26	2
Down	3	0	0	3	-8	0

17 July 2021; 14:00; Group stage Round 1	Waterford	0-16 (16) (15) 0-15	Down	Walsh Park; Referee: Justin Heffernan
17 July 2021; 14:00; Group stage Round 1		Report		Walsh Park; Referee: Justin Heffernan

18 July 2021; 14:00; Group stage Round 1	Cork	2-19 (25) (12) 0-12	Dublin	Páirc Uí Rinn, Cork; Referee: Kevin O'Brien
18 July 2021; 14:00; Group stage Round 1		Report		Páirc Uí Rinn, Cork; Referee: Kevin O'Brien

24 July 2021; 15:00; Group stage Round 2	Down	0-10 (10) (16) 1-13	Cork	Páirc Esler, Newry; Referee: Gavin Donegan
24 July 2021; 15:00; Group stage Round 2		Report		Páirc Esler, Newry; Referee: Gavin Donegan

24 July 2021; 17:00; Group stage Round 2	Dublin	0-09 (9) (23) 2-17	Waterford	Parnell Park, Dublin; Referee: John Dermody
24 July 2021; 17:00; Group stage Round 2		Report		Parnell Park, Dublin; Referee: John Dermody

31 July 2021; 17:00; Group stage Round 3	Cork	2-19 (25) (17) 3-08	Waterford	Páirc Uí Rinn, Cork; Referee: Barry Nea
31 July 2021; 17:00; Group stage Round 3		Report		Páirc Uí Rinn, Cork; Referee: Barry Nea

31 July 2021; 17:00; Group stage Round 3	Down	0-11 (11) (12) 1-09	Dublin	Páirc Esler, Newry; Referee: Eamon Cassidy
31 July 2021; 17:00; Group stage Round 3		Report		Páirc Esler, Newry; Referee: Eamon Cassidy

=== Group 3 ===
Team	Pld	W	D	L	Diff	Pts
Galway	3	3	0	0	+24	6
Kilkenny	3	2	0	1	+14	4
Clare	3	1	0	2	-6	2
Westmeath	3	0	0	3	-32	0

17 July 2021; 13:00; Group stage Round 1	Galway	3-16 (25) (8) 1-05	Westmeath	Kenny Park, Athenry; Referee: Ray Kelly
17 July 2021; 13:00; Group stage Round 1		Report		Kenny Park, Athenry; Referee: Ray Kelly

17 July 2021; 14:00; Group stage Round 1	Clare	0-16 (16) (22) 0-22	Kilkenny	Sixmilebridge; Referee: Andy Larkin
17 July 2021; 14:00; Group stage Round 1		Report		Sixmilebridge; Referee: Andy Larkin

24 July 2021; 14:00; Group stage Round 2	Westmeath	1-11 (14) (23) 2-17	Kilkenny	Cusack Park, Mullingar; Referee: Kevin O'Brien
24 July 2021; 14:00; Group stage Round 2		Report		Cusack Park, Mullingar; Referee: Kevin O'Brien

24 July 2021; 16:00; Group stage Round 2	Galway	2-12 (18) (12) 2-06	Clare	Kenny Park, Athenry; Referee: Liz Dempsey
24 July 2021; 16:00; Group stage Round 2		Report		Kenny Park, Athenry; Referee: Liz Dempsey

31 July 2021; 14:00; Group stage Round 3	Clare	2-12 (18) (12) 0-12	Westmeath	Cusack Park, Ennis; Referee: Cathal McAllister
31 July 2021; 14:00; Group stage Round 3		Report		Cusack Park, Ennis; Referee: Cathal McAllister

31 July 2021; 17:00; Group stage Round 3	Kilkenny	0-15 (15) (16) 1-13	Galway	John Lockes, Callan; Referee: John Dermody
31 July 2021; 17:00; Group stage Round 3		Report		John Lockes, Callan; Referee: John Dermody

== Relegation play-off ==
14 August 2021; 14:00; Relegation Semi-final	Down	1-16 (19) (27) 5-12	Offaly	Kingspan Breffni Park, Cavan; Referee: Ray Kelly
14 August 2021; 14:00; Relegation Semi-final		Report		Kingspan Breffni Park, Cavan; Referee: Ray Kelly

21 August 2021; 13:30; Relegation Final	Westmeath	2-04 (10) (20) 1-17	Down	Inniskeen; Referee: Gavin Donegan
21 August 2021; 13:30; Relegation Final		Result		Inniskeen; Referee: Gavin Donegan

== Knockout stage ==
21 August 2021; 17:00; Quarter-final	Wexford	1-12 (15) (28) 3-19	Kilkenny	Páirc Uí Chaoimh; Referee: Andrew Larkin (Cork)
21 August 2021; 17:00; Quarter-final		Report		Páirc Uí Chaoimh; Referee: Andrew Larkin (Cork)

21 August 2021; 18:45; Quarter-final	Tipperary	0-17 (17) (11) 0-11	Waterford	Páirc Uí Chaoimh; Referee: Liz Dempsey (Kilkenny)
21 August 2021; 18:45; Quarter-final		Report		Páirc Uí Chaoimh; Referee: Liz Dempsey (Kilkenny)

29 August 2021; 14:00; Semi-final	Galway	1-13 (16) (12) 0-12	Tipperary	Croke Park; Referee: Ray Kelly (Kildare)
29 August 2021; 14:00; Semi-final		Report		Croke Park; Referee: Ray Kelly (Kildare)

29 August 2021; 16:00; Semi-final	Cork	0-15 (15) (14) 1-11	Kilkenny	Croke Park; Referee: John Dermody (Westmeath)
29 August 2021; 16:00; Semi-final		Report		Croke Park; Referee: John Dermody (Westmeath)

12 September 2021; 16:15; 2021 All-Ireland Final	Cork	1-12 (15) (18) 1-15	Galway	Croke Park; Referee: Liz Dempsey (Kilkenny)
12 September 2021; 16:15; 2021 All-Ireland Final		Report		Croke Park; Referee: Liz Dempsey (Kilkenny)
