= 1959 All-Ireland Senior Camogie Championship =

Camogie championship

All-Ireland Senior Camogie Championship 1959
Winners
- Champions: Dublin (18th title)
- Manager: Nell McCarthy
- Captain: Bríd Reid

Runners-up
- Runners-up: Mayo
- Manager: PJ Hennelly
- Captain: Josie Ruane

Other
- Matches played: 11

The 1959 All-Ireland Senior Camogie Championship was the high point of the 1959 camogie season. The championship was won by Dublin who defeated surprise finalists Mayo by a 33-point margin in one of the most one-sided finals in camogie history. The match drew an attendance of 4,000. The championship was the first to have a match televised, when a BBC television crew covered the All-Ireland semi-final between Antrim and Dublin in Belfast.

== Early rounds ==
Boosted by the presence of the talented Josie Ruane from Keelogues at full-back and later at centre-back, and by the interest of PJ Hennelly, who later became general manager of the Connaught Telegraph, and Gerry Bracken of Newport, editor of The Mayo News, Mayo surprised Galway in Mulranny on May 31 in the Connacht semi-final and defeated Sligo 7–2 to 0–3 in the most unusual Connacht final in camogie history at Manulla on 5 July, with three goals from Peggy Coughter, two from Eileen Clarke and one each from Josie Ruane and Bridie Kilroy.

Waterford won the Munster championship for the first time with an outstanding full back Josie McNamara, who refereed the All Ireland semi-final between Dublin and Antrim, and was also a noted badminton player. With outstanding performances from Geraldine Power, Lilian Howlett and Pat Doyle, Waterford defeated Clare by 19 points in the first round of the Munster championship, then Limerick, Cork and London in the All Ireland quarter-final. Dublin beat Wexford in the lienster final.

== Semi-finals ==
The unlikely pairing of Mayo and Waterford met in a farcical semi-final at Newport on an unplayable field. The match, the first inter-county fixture to be drawn since the 1942 final, went into extra time and Waterford were leading by three points when Eileen Clarke pounced for an equalising goal. There was a suggestion that the teams play another period of extra time but the captains refused to continue. Instead the All-Ireland final fixed for 16 August was postponed to enable a replay in Roscrea.

Waterford led 1–5 to 1–1 at half-time in the replay before a great fight-back and a last minute victory for Mayo, who had 2-2 from Eileen Clarke a goal from Peggy Coughter and a point from Josie Ruane. Mayo snatched a last-minute victory, with a long-range point from centre-back, Josie Ruane, by 3–4 to 2–6. In the other semi-final between Dublin and Antrim Una O'Connor scored two goals, the first by pouncing on a bad clearance, and Kathleen Mills got the third with Dublin going on to win by two points.

== Final ==
Dublin went into the lead from the throw-in of the final, when Úna O'Connor raced through for a goal and eventually ran up a remarkable tally of 5–2. By half time Dublin led by 6–2 to 0–1, Mayo rallied briefly after the interval but Dublin continued to dominate exchanges and pile up the scores. It was late in the game before Mayo registered their only score from play, a well-taken goal by Eileen Clarke which was greeted with the greatest cheer of the evening. Agnes Hourigan wrote in the Irish Press:

Dublin’s superiority stemmed from midfield where the hard-working Annette Corrigan, Kay Mills and captain Brid Reid, who had flown back from her honeymoon to play, were always in complete control. These three laid on perfect passes for their clever forwards, who cut through the Mayo defence almost at will. Mayo seldom showed us anything of the fine form that had characterized their earlier victories. Sole exception was their captain, Josie Ruane, who did Trojan work at centre-back all through, and who was deadly accurate from frees, scoring all of her team’s points. Their lack of experience told against them and some of their players seemed over-awed by the setting and the occasion.

=== Final stages ===
2 August
Semi-Final

Dublin	3-3 – 2-4	Antrim

Casement Park

2 August
Semi-Final

Mayo	3-3 – 2-4	Waterford

Newport

16 August
Semi-Final Replay

Mayo	3-4 – 2-6	Waterford

Roscrea

17 September 1959
Final
15:00 BST

Dublin	11-6 – 1-3	Mayo
Annette Corrigan 0-1, Kathleen Mills 1-1, Mary O'Sullivan 2-1, Kay Ryder 2-0, Annie Donnelly 2-0, Una O'Connor 3-3		Eileen Clarke 1-0, Josie Ruane 0-3

Croke Park, Dublin
Attendance: 4,000
Referee: Nancy Murray (Antrim)

Dublin	Mayo

DUBLIN:
GK	1	Eithne Leech (Celtic)
FB	2	Betty Hughes (CIE)
RWB	3	Nuala Murney (UCD)
CB	4	Doreen Brennan (Austin Stacks)
LWB	5	Kay Lyons (Celtic)
MF	6	Bríd Reid (Austin Stacks) (Capt)
MF	7	Annette Corrigan (UCD) (0-1)
MF	8	Kathleen Mills (CIE) (1-1)
RWF	9	Mary O'Sullivan (Civil Service) (2-1)
CF	10	Kay Ryder (Naomh Aoife) (2-0)
LWF	11	Annie Donnelly (UCD) (2-0)
FF	12	Úna O'Connor (Celtic) (3-3)

(MAYO):
GK	1	Mary Maguire (Islandeady) (substituted off) 30'
FB	2	Margaret Kelly (Newport)
RWB	3	Kathleen Staunton (Islandeady)
CB	4	Josie Ruane (Manulla) (0-3)
LWB	5	Margaret Clarke (Manulla)
MF	6	Marcella McDonnell (Manulla)
MF	7	Vera McDonnell (Manulla)
MF	8	Carmel McHugh (Manulla) (substituted off) 25'
RWF	9	Eileen Clarke (Manulla) (1-0)
CF	10	Bríd Moran (Newport) (substituted off) 16'
LWF	11	Teresa Hoban (Newport)
FF	12	Bridie Kilroy (Newport)
Substitutes:
CF		Peggy Coughter (Manulla) for Moran (substituted on) 16'
MF		Rose Conway (Newport) for McHugh (substituted on) 25'
GK		Mary Daly for Maguire (substituted on) 30'

MATCH RULES

- 50 minutes
- Replay if scores level
- Maximum of 3 substitutions

== See also ==
- All-Ireland Senior Hurling Championship
- Wikipedia List of Camogie players
- National Camogie League
- Camogie All Stars Awards
- Ashbourne Cup

Preceded by All-Ireland Senior Camogie Championship 1958	All-Ireland Senior Camogie Championship; 1932 – present	Succeeded by All-Ireland Senior Camogie Championship 1960
