= 1991 All-Ireland Senior Camogie Championship =

Camogie championship

All-Ireland Senior Camogie Championship 1991
Championship details
- Dates: 8 June – 22 September 1991

All-Ireland champions
- Winners: Kilkenny (11th win)
- Captain: Angela Downey

All-Ireland runners-up
- Runners-up: Cork
- Captain: Therese O’Callaghan

Championship statistics
- Matches played: 7

The 1991 All-Ireland Senior Camogie Championship was won by Kilkenny who defeated Cork by a seven-point margin in the final. The match drew an attendance of 3,024, including President Mary Robinson.

== Final ==
Breda Holmes scored three goals for Kilkenny. Angela Downey’s ingenuity contributed to two of the goals, Marina Downey was the architect of the third. According to Kathryn Davis in the Irish Times:

An emotional Angela Downey, who was beset by cramp in the final minute and who looked as if she would not actually make it up the steps to receive the O'Duffy Cup put it more succinctly when she said: “it was pure stubbornness. We were written off but we came back for one last hurrah.”

=== Final stages ===
August 4
Semi-Final

Kilkenny	2-13 – 2-7	Wexford

Enniscorthy

August 11
Semi-Final

Cork	2-13 – 1-4	Galway

Ballinlough

September 22
Final

Kilkenny	3-8 – 0-10	Cork

Croke Park, Dublin

Kilkenny	Cork

KILKENNY:
GK	1	Marie Fitzpatrick (St Brigid’s Ballycallan)
FB	2	Biddy O'Sullivan (Shamrocks)
RWB	3	Una Murphy (Tullogher)
CB	4	Deirdre Malone (St Brigid’s Ballycallan)
LWB	5	Frances Rothwell (Mooncoin) (substituted off) 46'
MF	6	Marina Downey (Lisdowney)
MF	7	Ann Downey (Lisdowney) (0-3)
MF	8	Gillian Dillon (St Lachtain's) (2-0)
RWF	9	Sinéad Millea (St Brigid’s Ballycallan)
CF	10	Bridget Mullally (Glenmore)
LWF	11	Angela Downey (Lisdowney) (Capt) (0-4)
FF	12	Breda Holmes (Lisdowney) (1-1)
Substitutes:
LWB		Tracy Millea (St Brigid’s Ballycallan) for Rothwell (substituted in) 46'

CORK:
GK	1	Marian McCarthy
FB	2	Liz Dunphy
RWB	3	Paula Goggins
CB	4	Breda Kenny
LWB	5	Liz Towler
MF	6	Colette O’Mahony (0-3) (substituted in) 36'
MF	7	Therese O’Callaghan (Capt)
MF	8	Sandie Fitzgibbon (0-1)
RWF	9	Linda Mellerick
CF	10	Ger McCarthy (0-1)
LWF	11	Liz O’Neill
FF	12	Irne O’Leary (0-5)
Substitutes:
MF		Ine O'Keeffe for O’Mahoney (substituted in) 36'

Preceded by All-Ireland Senior Camogie Championship 1989	All-Ireland Senior Camogie Championship; 1932 – present	Succeeded by All-Ireland Senior Camogie Championship 1992
