= Kathleen Flaherty =

Kathleen Flaherty may refer to:

- Kathleen Flaherty (camogie), All-Ireland Senior Camogie Championship 1960
- Kathleen Flaherty, character in Best Friends Together
