= 1984 All-Ireland Senior Camogie Championship =

Camogie championship

All-Ireland Senior Camogie Championship 1984
Championship details
- Dates: June – 9 September 1984

All-Ireland champions
- Winners: Dublin (26th win)
- Captain: Anne Colgan

All-Ireland runners-up
- Runners-up: Tipperary
- Captain: Deirdre Lane

Championship statistics
- Matches played: 7

The 1984 All-Ireland Senior Camogie Championship was the high point of the 1984 season. The championship was won by Dublin who defeated Tipperary by a 14-point margin in the final. The match drew an attendance of 4,219.

== Quarter-finals ==
Dublin defeated Kilkenny by 6–6 to 4–4 in the preliminary round on a day Angela Downey scored 4-3 of Kilkenny;’s 4-4 total. Marie Connell got three goals for Dublin, Joan Gormley two and Barbara Redmond the sixth.

== Semi-finals ==
A last-minute goal by Genny English, a cousin of Nicholas English, forced the Tipperary-Wexford semi-final to a replay. Tipperary had a two-minute lead with three minutes to go when Nancy Griffin sealed their place in the final.

== Final ==
Dublin's victory came at the third attempt in successive finals. Their first goal came from right full back Germaine Noonan in the 13th minute when her long shot was let drop through the fingers of Tipperary goalkeeper Breda Kennedy. Three minutes later Marie Connell struck for a second goal and Dublin were not caught afterwards. They led by 3-5 to 0-2 at half time. Sean Kilfeather wrote in the Irish Times:

With the wind behind them Dulbi started strongly and, driving the ball great distances, they kept Tipperary under a constant barrage in the early part of the game. Tipperary kept their heads under pressure, however, and might have taken the lead but for a splendid save by the Dublin goalkeeper Yvonne Redmond from a shot by Deirdre Lane. By the 13th minute Tipperary were quite happy to be in arrears by only two points.

=== Final stages ===
July 8
First round

Tipperary	5-17 – 1-0	Louth

July 8
First round

Limerick	3-9 – 1-4	Down

July 8
First round

Wexford	7-3 – 1-1	Antrim

July 8
First round

Cork	4-7 – 1-4	Clare

July 15
First Round

Dublin	6-6 – 4-4	Kilkenny

Parnell Park

July 29
Quarter-final

Dublin	3-9 – 1-4	Limerick

Adare

July 29
Quarter-final

Wexford	3-9 – 1-4	Down

Portaferry

Aug 12
Semi-Final

Dublin	3-4 – 1-9	Cork

Parnell Park

Aug 12
Semi-Final

Tipperary	1-4 – 0-7	Wexford

Monamolin

Aug 26
Semi-Final replay

Tipperary	1-10 – 1-4	Wexford

Borrisokane

1984-9-9
Final
15:00 BST

Dublin	2-5 – 1-4	Tipperary
Edel Murphy 0-7, Marie Connell 2-0, Joan Gormley 1-1, Germaine Noonan 1-0, Una Crowley 1-0, Mary Mernagh 0-1.		Triona Bonnar 0-1, Deirdre Lane 2-0, Genny English 0-2, Susan Hickey 0-1

Croke Park, Dublin
Referee: Kathleen Quinn (Galway)

Dublin	Tipperary

DUBLIN:
GK	1	Yvonne Redmond (Cúchulainn Crumlin)
FB	2	Marion Conroy (Austin Stacks)
RWB	3	Germaine Noonan (UCD) (1-0)
CB	4	Bernie Toner (Cuala Naomh Mhuire) (substituted off) 48'
LWB	5	Catherine Ledwidge (Phoenix)
MF	6	Una Crowley (Celtic) (1-0)
MF	7	Mary Mernagh (Cuala Naomh Mhuire) (0-1)
MF	8	Barbara Redmond (Cúchulainn Crumlin)
RWF	9	Joan Gormley (UCD) (1-1)
CF	10	Anne Colgan (Celtic) (Capt)
LWF	11	Edel Murphy (UCD) (0-7)
FF	12	Marie Connell (Celtic) (2-0) (substituted off) 46'
Substitutes:
FF		Toni O'Byrne (Phoenix) for Connell (substituted on) 46'
CB		Noelle Fleming (Celtic) for Toner (substituted on) 48'

TIPPERARY:
GK	1	Breda Kennedy (Portroe)
FB	2	Mary Sheedy (Portroe)
RWB	3	Maura Hackett (Portroe)
CB	4	Siobhán McDonnell (St Culain’s)
LWB	5	Margaret Madden (Portroe)
MF	6	Rosie Ryan (Roscrea)
MF	7	Geraldine Ryan (Cappawhite) (substituted off) 35'
MF	8	Anne Gleeson (Templederry)
RWF	9	Triona Bonnar (Cashel) (0-1) (substituted off) 44'
CF	10	Deirdre Lane (Celtic) & (Lorrha) (Capt) (2-0)
LWF	11	Genny English Emly (0-2)
FF	12	Mary Griffin (St Mary’s Clonmel) (substituted off) 44'
Substitutes:
LCF		Susan Hickey (Portroe) (0-1) for Geraldine Ryan (substituted on) 35'
CF		Kirsty McCluskey (Cashel) for Griffin (substituted on) 44'
CF		Eithne Bonnar (Cashel) for Triona Bonnar (substituted on) 44'

MATCH RULES

- 50 minutes
- Replay if scores level
- Maximum of 3 substitutions

== See also ==
- All-Ireland Senior Hurling Championship
- Wikipedia List of Camogie players
- National Camogie League
- Camogie All Stars Awards
- Ashbourne Cup

Preceded by All-Ireland Senior Camogie Championship 1983	All-Ireland Senior Camogie Championship; 1932 – present	Succeeded by All-Ireland Senior Camogie Championship 1985
