= Gretta =

Gretta may refer to:

== People ==
- Gretta Bowen (1880–1981), self-taught Irish artist
- Gretta Chambers (1927–2017), Canadian journalist and former Chancellor of McGill University
- Gretta Cohn, American cellist and radio producer
- Gretta Duisenberg (born 1942), Dutch political activist
- Gretta Kehoe-Quigley, former camogie player, captain of the All Ireland Camogie Championship
- Gretta Kok (born 1944), retired Dutch breaststroke swimmer
- Gretta Lange Bader (1931–2014), American sculptor
- Gretta Melsted, American softball coach
- Gretta Pecl, Australian marine ecologist
- Gretta Sarfaty Marchant, international artist and curator
- Gretta Taslakian (born 1985), Lebanese sprinter of Armenian descent
- Gretta Taylor (née Francis), musician and teacher from Trinidad and Tobago
- Gretta Vosper (born 1958), Canadian minister, writer and leader within the Progressive Christianity movement

== See also ==
- Greta (disambiguation)
