= 1936 All-Ireland Senior Camogie Championship =

Camogie championship

All-Ireland Senior Camogie Championship 1936
Championship details
- Dates: N/A – 11 October 1936

All-Ireland champions
- Winners: Cork (3rd win)
- Captain: Kitty Cotter

All-Ireland runners-up
- Runners-up: Louth
- Captain: Rose Quigley

The 1936 All-Ireland Senior Camogie Championship was the high point of the 1936 season in Camogie. The championship was won by Dublin, who defeated Louth by a ten-point margin in the final.

== Leinster Final ==
When Louth defeated Dublin 5–4 to 4–1 in the Leinster final on 26 July 1936, it was the last time Dublin would lose a match in the Leinster championship until they lost to Kilkenny on 23 June 1968. Dublin led through goals from Jean Hannon and Ita McNeill at half time against 1–2 from Kitty Hanratty, Dublin added a goal from Eva Moran immediately after half time but Louth replied with a goal from Nellie McDonald and then took control in the last quarter with three more goals from Kitty Hanratty. Máire Ní Cheallaigh wrote in The Irish Press:

Playing with a dash and spirit that could not be checked, Louth regained the Leinster Camoguidheacht championship after a thrilling final in Killester yesterday. Fleet of foot and keen of eye, the Louth girls buikled into their work with a rare zest from the first whistle. They set a pace that Dublin did well to match but the end found the girls from the wee county lasting that pace the better, and it was in the last quarter of an hour that they earned a great victory. There was a weak link in the team from Brighde McGuinness in goal to Kitty Hanratty at full forward, there was an understanding that covered what few individual weaknesses existed. Rose Quigley delighted the crowd with her lengthy kicks that she brought into operation when she found her hurley blocked. In a lively and accurate Louth attack Kitty Hanratty was the star, with Bernie Donnelly and Nellie McDonald little behind her. In this department Louth held the advantage despite the great efforts of Maura Walsh and Peggy Griffin.

== Matches ==
Cork beat Clare 14–0 to 1–1, in a match in which Chris Markham of Clare became the first player to score a goal at the original Cusack Park in Ennis, a week before its opening. Galway defeated Sligo in the Connacht final. Galway were 2–2 to 0–2 ahead of Louth at half time in the semi-final but 1–3 from Kathleen Hanratty equalised the scores, Nellie McDonnell scored a goal to give Louth the lead and after a Galway point Kathleen Hanratty scored another goal.

== Final ==
Having clawed their way back into the semi-final from six points down, Louth fell 3–1 to 1–1 behind at half time in the final and then 4–1 to 1–1 immediately on the resumption. They then looked like they were about to stage another great recovery. This time goals from Cork's Josie McGrath and Anne Barry in a three-minute period killed off their revival. Joan and Kitty Cotter became the first sisters to win All-Ireland medals.

== Championship Results ==
=== Final stages ===
20 September
Semi-Final

Louth	3–6 – 2–3	Galway

Killester

20 September
Semi-Final

Cork	5–2 – 0–0	Antrim

Killester

11 October
Final

Cork	6–4 –3–3	Louth

Croke Park

Cork	Louth

Cork:
GK	1	Nora O'Sullivan
FB	2	Lena Delaney
RWB	3	Essie Stanton
CB	4	Mollie Higgins
LWB	5	Maura Cronin
MF	6	Kitty Cotter (Capt) (substituted off) 36'
MF	7	Lil Kirby (0–2)
MF	8	May McCarthy
RWF	9	Kitty Buckley (1–2)
CF	10	Josie McGrath (1–0)
LWF	11	Sheila Brennan (1–0)
FF	12	Anne Barry (3–0)
Substitute:
LCF		Mary Madden for Kitty Cotter (substituted in) 36'

Louth:
GK	1	Sarah McGuinness Darver
FB	2	Nan Hanratty Darver
RWB	3	Mary McArdle Darver
CB	4	Bridget McKeown Darver
LWB	5	Aggie McCluskey Darver
MF	6	Rose Quigley Darver (Capt)
MF	7	Bríd Sharkey Darver
MF	8	Mary McKeever Darver
RWF	9	Nellie McDonnell Darver
CF	10	Kathleen Hanratty Darver (0–3)
LWF	11	Bridie Donnelly Knockbridge (2–0).
FF	12	Kathleen Johnson Knockbridge (1–0)

Match Rules

- 50 minutes
- Replay if scores level
- Maximum of 3 substitutions

== See also ==
- All-Ireland Senior Hurling Championship
- Wikipedia List of Camogie players
- National Camogie League
- Camogie All Stars Awards
- Ashbourne Cup

Preceded by 1935 All-Ireland Senior Camogie Championship	All-Ireland Senior Camogie Championship; 1932–present	Succeeded by 1937 All-Ireland Senior Camogie Championship
