= 1940 All-Ireland Senior Camogie Championship =

Camogie championship

All-Ireland Senior Camogie Championship 1940
Tournament details
- Date: 19 May – 12 October

Winners
- Champions: Cork (5th title)
- Captain: Lil Kirby

Runners-up
- Runners-up: Galway
- Captain: Peg Morris

Other
- Matches played: 2

The 1940 All-Ireland Senior Camogie Championship was the high point of the 1940 season in Camogie. The championship was won by Cork, who defeated Galway by a five-point margin in the final.

== Structure ==
Dublin were still in isolation, the only remaining members left of the old Camogie association while the other country boards affiliated to the National Camogie Association after a dispute over lifting the ban on hockey players. Cork defeated Waterford by 5–3 to 1–4 in the only match played in Munster, a match refereed by dual All-Ireland medallist and future Taoiseach, Jack Lynch. Antrim, champions for five years in Ulster, were surprisingly beaten by Derry, who then lost the Ulster final to Cavan. Celia Mulholland, Eileen O'Beirne, Peg Morris and Frances Coen scored Galway's goals in their semi-final defeat of Cavan. Louth had most of the play and did most of the attacking in the second half when they lost to Cork in the semi-final at Darver. Renee Fitzgerald, Eileen Casey, Kathleen Barry Murphy and Casey again were Cork's goalscorers.

== Final ==
Cork led Galway by 4–1 to 0–1 by half-time in the final and won despite being kept Cork scoreless for the remainder of the game and Galway's recovery goals from Peg Morris and Celia Mulholland.

=== Final stages ===
29 September
Semi-Final

Cork	4–3 – 1–5	Louth

Darver

29 September
Semi-Final

Galway	4–2 – 0–3	Cavan

14 October
Final

Cork	4–1 – 2–2	Galway

Croke Park

Cork	Galway

Dublin:
GK	1	Peggy Hogg
FB	2	Kathleen Coughlan
RWB	3	Maura Brennan
CB	4	Joan Cotter
LWB	5	Mary Fitzgerald
MF	6	Kitty Buckley (1–0)
MF	7	Lil Kirby (Capt) (1–1)
MF	8	Nan O'Dowd
RWF	9	Patty Hegarty (1–0)
CF	10	Eileen Casey
LWF	11	Renee Fitzgerald (1–0)
FF	12	Maureen Cashman

Galway:
GK	1	Josie Melvin
FB	2	Kathleen Keyes
RWB	3	Monica Duggan
CB	4	Catherine Griffin
LWB	5	Nora Conroy
MF	6	Kathleen Cosgrove (0–1)
MF	7	Frances Coen
MF	8	Hilda Murphy
RWF	9	Peg Morris (Capt) (1–1)
CF	10	Eileen O'Beirne
LWF	11	Nora O'Connell
FF	12	Celia Mulholland (1–0)

Match Rules

- 50 minutes
- Replay if scores level
- Maximum of 3 substitutions

== See also ==
- All-Ireland Senior Hurling Championship
- Wikipedia List of Camogie players
- National Camogie League
- Camogie All Stars Awards
- Ashbourne Cup

Preceded by 1939 All-Ireland Senior Camogie Championship	All-Ireland Senior Camogie Championship; 1932–present	Succeeded by 1941 All-Ireland Senior Camogie Championship
