= 1935 All-Ireland Senior Camogie Championship =

Camogie championship

All-Ireland Senior Camogie Championship 1935
Championship details
- Dates: N/A – 17 December 1935

All-Ireland champions
- Winners: Cork (2nd win)
- Captain: Josie McGrath

All-Ireland runners-up
- Runners-up: Dublin
- Captain: Mollie Gill

The 1935 All-Ireland Senior Camogie Championship was the high point of the 1935 season in Camogie. The championship was won by Cork, who defeated Dublin by a single point margin in the final.

== Structure ==
Antrim beat Derry 7–0 to 0–0 and Down 9–0 to 1–1 to win the Ulster championship. Cork beat Clare 10–0 to 1–5 and Tipperary 8–5 to 4–0 to win the Munster Championship. Galway beat Roscommon 2–1 to 1–1 and Mayo 4–2 to 1–1 to win the Connacht Championship, while Dublin beat Meath 5–2 to 3–1, Longford 11–3 to 0–0, reigning champions Louth 5–4 to 3–1 and Wexford 7–4 to 1–0 to win the Leinster Championship. The semi-finals were played together in Croke Park.

== Final ==
St Aloysius School had won the Cork Senior Championship so 17-year-old Josie McGrath captained the team alongside schoolmate Kitty Buckley and Peggy Hogg a late withdrawal from the team. Jean Hannon scored an early Dublin goal but Cork led by two points at half time and had pulled ahead until two Dublin goals for Angela Egan set up an exciting finish.

The Irish Press reported,

Two worthier exponents of the code could not be found, and after one of the greatest games ever played, Cork retained their title. The pace was a cracker from start to finish and the exchanges were tremendously exciting, particularly in the second half. Despite the narrow margin there was little doubt about the Cork girls' superiority. Territorially they were a good deal more of the play and were it not for Dublin's grand defence in which Misses Gill, Egan and Kenny were the stars, Cork would have had a more substantial win.

== Championship Results ==
=== Final stages ===
10 November
Semi-Final

Cork	4–1 – 2–4	Antrim

Croke Park

10 November
Semi-Final

Dublin	8–5 – 2–1	Galway

Croke Park

17 December
Final

Cork	3–4 – 4–0	Dublin

Croke Park

Cork	Dublin

Cork:
GK	1	May Kelleher
FB	2	Joan Cotter
RWB	3	Essie Stanton
CB	4	Lena Delaney
LWB	5	Dolly Quirke
MF	6	May McCarthy
MF	7	Lil Kirby (0–3)
MF	8	Margaret Delaney
RWF	9	Kitty Buckley (2–1)
CF	10	Josie McGrath (Capt)
LWF	11	Sheila Brennan (1–0)
FF	12	Maura Cronin

Dublin:
GK	1	Bríd Kenny (Col San Dominic)
FB	2	Mary Walsh (UCD)
RWB	3	Eileen Windsor (Crokes)
CB	4	Emmy Delaney (UCD)
LWB	5	Louise Doran (Optimists)
MF	6	Angela Egan (Col San Dominic)
MF	7	Máire Gill (Crokes)
MF	8	Máire O'Kelly (Col San Dominic)
RWF	9	Nuala Sheehan (UCD) (1–0)
CF	10	Queenie Dunne (Bray United)
LWF	11	Ita McNeill (UCD)
FF	12	Jean Hannon (Bray United) (3–0).

Match Rules

- 50 minutes
- Replay if scores level
- Maximum of 3 substitutions

== See also ==
- All-Ireland Senior Hurling Championship
- Wikipedia List of Camogie players
- National Camogie League
- Camogie All Stars Awards
- Ashbourne Cup

Preceded by 1934 All-Ireland Senior Camogie Championship	All-Ireland Senior Camogie Championship; 1932–present	Succeeded by 1936 All-Ireland Senior Camogie Championship
