= 2026 All-Ireland Senior Camogie Championship =

Camogie competition in Ireland

All-Ireland Senior Camogie Championship 2026
Championship details
- Dates: 16 May – 9 August, 2026
- Teams: 10

All-Ireland champions
- Winners: Cork (31st win)
- Captain: Meabh Cahalane
- Manager: Ger Manley

All-Ireland runners-up
- Runners-up: Galway
- Captain: Carrie Dolan
- Manager: Cathal Murray

Championship statistics
- Matches played: 27

The 2026 All-Ireland Senior Camogie Championship, known for sponsorship reasons as the Glen Dimplex Senior All-Ireland Championship, was the premier inter-county competition of the 2026 camogie season. Ten county teams from Ireland competed. Cork were the winners, defeating Galway in the final.

== Format ==
Group stage

The ten teams were in two groups. Group 1 had the four teams who made the semi finals in 2025; Group 2 had the remaining six teams. Each team plays every other team in its group once, with 3 points are awarded for a win and 1 for a draw.

Relegations

The bottom 2 teams in Group 2 had a play off, with the loser relegated to the All-Ireland Intermediate Camogie Championship for 2027.

Knock-out stage

The top 2 teams in Group 1 advanced to the semi-finals. The remaining 2 teams in Group 1 will play the top teams in Group 2 in the quarter final round.

== Group stage ==
=== Group 1 ===
| Pos | Team | Pld | W | D | L | PF | PA | PD | Pts | Qualification |
|---|---|---|---|---|---|---|---|---|---|---|
| 1 | Cork | 3 | 3 | 0 | 0 | 55 | 39 | +16 | 9 | Advance to All-Ireland semi-final |
| 2 | Galway | 3 | 2 | 0 | 1 | 53 | 46 | +7 | 6 | Advance to All-Ireland semi-final |
| 3 | Waterford | 3 | 1 | 0 | 2 | 39 | 45 | −6 | 3 | Advance to All-Ireland quarter-final |
| 4 | Tipperary | 3 | 0 | 0 | 3 | 46 | 63 | −17 | 0 | Advance to All-Ireland quarter-final |

Source: camogie.ie

| 6 June 2026; 14:00; Round 1 | Galway | 1-08 - 0-18 | Cork | Kenny Park, Athenry |
| 6 June 2026; 14:00; Round 1 | | Report | | Kenny Park, Athenry |

| 7 June 2026; 15:30; Round 1 | Waterford | 0-16 - 1-10 | Tipperary | Walsh Park |
| 7 June 2026; 15:30; Round 1 | | Report | | Walsh Park |

| 14 June 2026; 14:00; Round 2 | Waterford | 0-13 - 1-13 | Galway | Walsh Park |
| 14 June 2026; 14:00; Round 2 | | Report | | Walsh Park |

| 14 June 2026; 15:30; Round 2 | Tipperary | 0-18 - 0-21 | Cork | Semple Stadium |
| 14 June 2026; 15:30; Round 2 | | Report | | Semple Stadium |

| 28 June 2026; 15:30; Round 3 | Galway | 3-17 - 0-15 | Tipperary | Kenny Park |
| 28 June 2026; 15:30; Round 3 | | Report | | Kenny Park |

| 28 June 2026; 15:30; Round 3 | Cork | 1-13 - 0-10 | Waterford | Páirc Uí Rinn |
| 28 June 2026; 15:30; Round 3 | | Report | | Páirc Uí Rinn |

=== Group 2 ===
| Pos | Team | Pld | W | D | L | PF | PA | PD | Pts | Qualification |
|---|---|---|---|---|---|---|---|---|---|---|
| 1 | Kilkenny | 5 | 5 | 0 | 0 | 121 | 68 | +53 | 15 | Advance to All-Ireland quarter-final |
| 2 | Clare | 5 | 4 | 0 | 1 | 83 | 81 | +2 | 12 | Advance to All-Ireland quarter-final |
| 3 | Limerick | 5 | 2 | 1 | 2 | 89 | 102 | −13 | 7 | |
| 4 | Offaly | 5 | 2 | 0 | 3 | 80 | 99 | −19 | 6 | |
| 5 | Dublin | 5 | 1 | 1 | 3 | 92 | 91 | +1 | 4 | Relegation playoff |
| 6 | Wexford (R) | 5 | 0 | 0 | 5 | 67 | 91 | −24 | 0 | Relegation playoff |

Source: camogie.ie
(R) Relegated to Intermediate Championship

| 16 May 2026; Round 1 | Offaly | 2-10 - 1-12 | Wexford | Glenisk O'Connor Park |
| 16 May 2026; Round 1 | | Report | | Glenisk O'Connor Park |

| 23 May 2026; Round 1 | Kilkenny | 3-19 - 1-11 | Limerick | UPMC Nowlan Park |
| 23 May 2026; Round 1 | | Report | | UPMC Nowlan Park |

| 23 May 2026; Round 1 | Clare | 2-16 - 3-10 | Dublin | Cusack Park (Ennis) |
| 23 May 2026; Round 1 | | Report | | Cusack Park (Ennis) |

| 30 May 2026; Round 2 | Limerick | 3-13 - 1-14 | Offaly | TUS Moylish |
| 30 May 2026; Round 2 | | Report | | TUS Moylish |

| 30 May 2026; Round 2 | Dublin | 1-12 - 2-16 | Kilkenny | Parnell Park |
| 30 May 2026; Round 2 | | Report | | Parnell Park |

| 30 May 2026; Round 2 | Wexford | 1-11 - 3-9 | Clare | Chadwicks Wexford Park |
| 30 May 2026; Round 2 | | Report | | Chadwicks Wexford Park |

| 6 June 2026; Round 3 | Kilkenny | 5-15 - 3-09 | Offaly | UPMC Nowlan Park |
| 6 June 2026; Round 3 | | Report | | UPMC Nowlan Park |

| 6 June 2026; Round 3 | Dublin | 1-18 - 0-08 | Wexford | Parnell Park |
| 6 June 2026; Round 3 | | Report | | Parnell Park |

| 6 June 2026; Round 3 | Clare | 1-13 - 0-11 | Limerick | Cusack Park (Ennis) |
| 6 June 2026; Round 3 | | Report | | Cusack Park (Ennis) |

| 20 June 2026; 15:30; Round 4 | Wexford | 3-11 - 1-18 | Limerick | Chadwicks Wexford Park |
| 20 June 2026; 15:30; Round 4 | | Report | | Chadwicks Wexford Park |

| 2026-06-20; Round 4 | Kilkenny | 4-14 - 1-08 | Clare | UPMC Nowlan Park |
| 2026-06-20; Round 4 | | Report | | UPMC Nowlan Park |

| 20 June 2026; Round 4 | Offaly | 0-18 - 1-13 | Dublin | St Brendan's Park |
| 20 June 2026; Round 4 | | Report | | St Brendan's Park |

| 27 June 2026; Round 5 | Offaly | 1-08 - 0-16 | Clare | St Brendan's Park |
| 27 June 2026; Round 5 | | Report | | St Brendan's Park |

| 27 June 2026; Round 5 | Wexford | 1-07 - 1-12 | Kilkenny | Chadwicks Wexford Park |
| 27 June 2026; Round 5 | | Report | | Chadwicks Wexford Park |

| 27 June 2026; 15:30; Round 5 | Limerick | 3-12 - 1-18 | Dublin | Cappamore GAA |
| 27 June 2026; 15:30; Round 5 | | Report | | Cappamore GAA |

== Relegation playoff ==
| 5 July 2026; 16:00 | Dublin | 0-17 (17) – 1-10 (13) | Wexford | Nowlan Park |

Wexford are relegated to the All-Ireland Intermediate Camogie Championship for 2027.

== Knockout stage ==
=== Bracket ===
Quarter-finals; 4/5 July
Kilkenny (a.e.t.) | 2-19
Waterford | 1-19
Tipperary | 3-20
Clare | 3-13

Semi-finals; 25 July
Galway | 1-14
Kilkenny | 0-11
Cork | 2-16
Tipperary | 0-17

Final; 9 August
Galway | 0-19
Cork | 2-14

=== Results ===
RTÉ2

4 July 2026
13:00
Quarter-final

Report

| Waterford | 1-19 (22) – (25) 2-19 (a.e.t.) | Kilkenny |
|---|---|---|
(HT: 0-09 – 0-07) (FT: 0-15 – 0-15)

Croke Park, Dublin
Referee: Joe Mullins (Clare)

RTÉ2

5 July 2026
13:30
Quarter-final

Report

| Tipperary | 3-20 (29) – (22) 3-13 | Clare |
|---|---|---|
(HT: 0-10 – 0-04)

Croke Park, Dublin
Referee: Gavin Donegan (Dublin)

RTÉ2

25 July 2026
16:00
Semi-final

Report

| Galway | 1-14 (17) – (11) 0-11 | Kilkenny |
|---|---|---|
(HT: 0-7 – 0-5)

Semple Stadium, Thurles
Referee: Andy Larkin
Attendance: 10,311

RTÉ2

25 July 2026
18:00
Semi-final

Report

| Cork | 2-16 (22) – (17) 0-17 | Tipperary |
|---|---|---|
(HT: 2-11 – 0-8)

Semple Stadium, Thurles
Referee: Barry Nea (Westmeath)
Attendance: 10,311

RTÉ2
RTÉ News Now

9 August 2026
16:15
Final

Report

| Galway | 0-19 (19) – (20) 2-14 | Cork |
|---|---|---|
(HT: 0-9 – 0-7)
| Pts: C Dolan 5 (4fs), N Niland 4, C Kelly 3, A Donohue 3, D Higgins 1, N McPeake 1, M Dillon 1, S Healy 1(f) | | Gls: S McCarthy 1, O Cahalane 1 Pts: A O’Connor 5 (4fs), S McCartan 4, S McCarthy 2 (1f), O Cahalane 1, E Murphy 1, L Hayes 1 |

Croke Park, Dublin
Referee: G. Donegan (Dublin)
Attendance: 33,419
