= 1960 All-Ireland Senior Camogie Championship =

Camogie championship

All-Ireland Senior Camogie Championship 1960
Winners
- Champions: Dublin (19th title)
- Manager: Nell McCarthy
- Captain: Doreen Brennan

Runners-up
- Runners-up: Galway
- Captain: Kathleen Corcoran

The 1960 All-Ireland Senior Camogie Championship was the high point of the 1960 season in Camogie. The championship was won by Dublin who defeated Galway by a 14-point margin in the final.

== Changes in the old order ==
Dublin needed twenty minutes of extra time to beat Tipperary in the semi-final after what Agnes Hourigan, president of the Camogie Association, described in the Irish Press as "one of the hardest, fastest and most exciting camogie matches ever played". Tipperary led 1–1 to nil at half time through a goal from Brid Scully, the score was 2–1 each at full time, Kathleen Mills shot a spectacular long range goal from a free in the first minute of extra time and Dublin never subsequently lost the lead, although Tipperary cut the lead back to a point. Galway shocked Antrim in the All Ireland semi-final at Casement Park with a bizarre match-winning goal. Antrim, led until three minutes from the end, when Chris Conway dropped a high lobbing ball into the Antrim goalmouth. The ball struck the in-rushing Emer Walsh on the top of the head and was deflected out of the reach of the Antrim goalkeeper for the winner.

== Final ==
Interest in the final had evaporated by the time it was played, delayed by the drawn All Ireland senior football final.

=== Final stages ===
July 17
Semi-Final

Dublin	5–1 – 3–3 after extra time	Tipperary

Parnell Park

July 31
Semi-Final

Galway	3–1 – 2–3	Antrim

Casement Park

November 13
Final

Dublin	6–2 – 2–0	Galway

Croke Park

Dublin	Galway

DUBLIN:
GK	1	Eithne Leech (Celtic)
FB	2	Betty Hughes (CIÉ)
RWB	3	Nuala Murney (UCD)
CB	4	Doreen Brennan (UCD) (Capt)
LWB	5	Anne Nulty (CIÉ)
MF	6	Collette Nolan (Eoghan Rua)
MF	7	Ally Hussey (Celtic)
MF	8	Kathleen Mills (CIÉ)
RWF	9	Joanne Kinsella (Civil Service) (3–0)
CF	10	Kay Ryder (Naomh Aoife)
LWF	11	Ann Donnelly (UCD) (1–0)
FF	12	Úna O'Connor (Celtic) (2–2)

GALWAY:
GK	1	Ellen Naughton (St Mary's)
FB	2	Pasty Colclough (St Enda's)
RWB	3	Evelyn Niland (St Mary's)
CB	4	Ronnie Heneghan (Castlegar)
LWB	5	Sheila Tonry (Castlegar)
MF	6	Chris Conway (Castlegar)
MF	7	Kathleen Higgins (Athenry) (1–0)
MF	8	Kathleen Corcoran (Castlegar) (Capt)
RWF	9	Frances Fox (St Enda's) (1–0)
CF	10	Kathleen Clancy (St Mary's)
LWF	11	Kathleen Flaherty (Castlegar)
FF	12	Emer Walsh (Castlegar)

MATCH RULES

- 50 minutes
- Replay if scores level
- Maximum of 3 substitutions

== See also ==
- All-Ireland Senior Hurling Championship
- Wikipedia List of Camogie players
- National Camogie League
- Camogie All Stars Awards
- Ashbourne Cup

Preceded by All-Ireland Senior Camogie Championship 1959	All-Ireland Senior Camogie Championship; 1932 – present	Succeeded by All-Ireland Senior Camogie Championship 1961
