= 1941 All-Ireland Senior Camogie Championship =

Camogie championship

All-Ireland Senior Camogie Championship 1941
Tournament details
- Date: 27 April – 12 October

Winners
- Champions: Cork (6th title)
- Captain: Josie McGrath

Runners-up
- Runners-up: Dublin
- Captain: Josie Dempsey

The 1941 All-Ireland Senior Camogie Championship was the high point of the 1941 season in Camogie. The championship was won by Cork, who defeated Dublin by a 21-point margin in the final.

== Structure ==
Dublin were in isolation from the camogie establishment, the sole remaining members of the "old association" since mid-1939 but one Dublin club had affiliated to the central Council of the Camogie Association and represented the county, Great Southern Railway, which had two young players who were to become the leading exponents of the game in their generation, Kathleen Cody and Kathleen Mills. In the All Ireland semi-final at Breffni Park the CIE Dublin team drew with Cavan, who had won a delayed Ulster championship because of difficulties getting the Ulster final played in wartime conditions. When it took place on 14 September, Cavan, who had earlier defeated Fermanagh and Monaghan, beat Antrim 2–3 to 1–2. The following week they played Dublin in the All Ireland semi-final in Breffni Park, Rita Sullivan scoring Cavan's fourth goal and the equalising score in the final seconds of play.

Four points from Kathleen Cody and goals from Sheila Cunningham, Laura Blunn and May Neville helped Dublin to a 3–4 to 1–4 semi-final victory over Cavan in the replay at Inchicore. Ann Fitzpatrick scored Cavan's goal at the beginning of the second half. It was a robust match in which two players retired injured in the first half. While the Anglo Celt reported

"Cavan were quick to appreciate the worth of the opposition and their spoiling tactics effectively cramped the overhead style of the Dublin cailíní, which, if allowed to develop, might have brought serious developments."

the Irish Independent reported,

referee Peg Morris had difficulty controlling a game which also produced the unedifying spectacle of girls indulging in fisticuffs.

== Final ==
Kitty Buckley scored six goals in Cork's victory. Maureen and Patty Hegarty were the first twins to win All-Ireland medals. Dublin full-back Tess Leahy, was the first Kilkenny woman to play in an All-Ireland final. Her brother, Terry, scored the winning point for Kilkenny in the 1947 All-Ireland hurling final.

=== Final stages ===
21 September
Semi-Final

Cork	8–3 – 0–2	Galway

The Mardyke

21 September
Semi-Final

Dublin	3–3 – 4–0	Cavan

Breffni Park

28 September
Semi-Final Replay

Dublin	3–4 – 1–1	Cavan

Inchicore

12 October
Final

Cork	7–5 – 1–2	Dublin

Croke Park

Cork	Dublin

Cork:
GK	1	Peggy Hogg
FB	2	Joan Cotter
RWB	3	Maureen Hegarty
CB	4	Lil Kirby
LWB	5	Mary Fitzgerald
MF	6	Kathleen Coughlan (0–3)
MF	7	Mary Vallelly
MF	8	Mona Hobbs
RWF	9	Patty Hegarty
CF	10	Kitty Buckley (Capt) (6–0)
LWF	11	Eileen Casey (1–0)
FF	12	Kathleen Barry (0–2).

Dublin:
GK	1	Mary Bergin (GSR)
FB	2	Tess Leahy (GSR)
RWB	3	Eileen Stack (GSR)
CB	4	Dolly Byrne (GSR)
LWB	5	Queenie Hackett (GSR)
MF	6	Josie Dempsey (GSR)
MF	7	Kathleen Cody (GSR) (0–2)
MF	8	Kathleen Mills (GSR)
RWF	9	May Neville (GSR)
CF	10	Kathleen Lanigan (GSR) (1–0)
LWF	11	Sheila Cunningham (GSR)
FF	12	Laura Blunn (GSR)

Match Rules

- 50 minutes
- Replay if scores level
- Maximum of 3 substitutions

== See also ==
- All-Ireland Senior Hurling Championship
- Wikipedia List of Camogie players
- National Camogie League
- Camogie All Stars Awards
- Ashbourne Cup

Preceded by 1940 All-Ireland Senior Camogie Championship	All-Ireland Senior Camogie Championship; 1932–present	Succeeded by 1942 All-Ireland Senior Camogie Championship
