= All-Ireland Senior Camogie Championship =

Camogie championship

All Ireland Senior Camogie Championship
- Current season or competition: 2026 All-Ireland Senior Camogie Championship
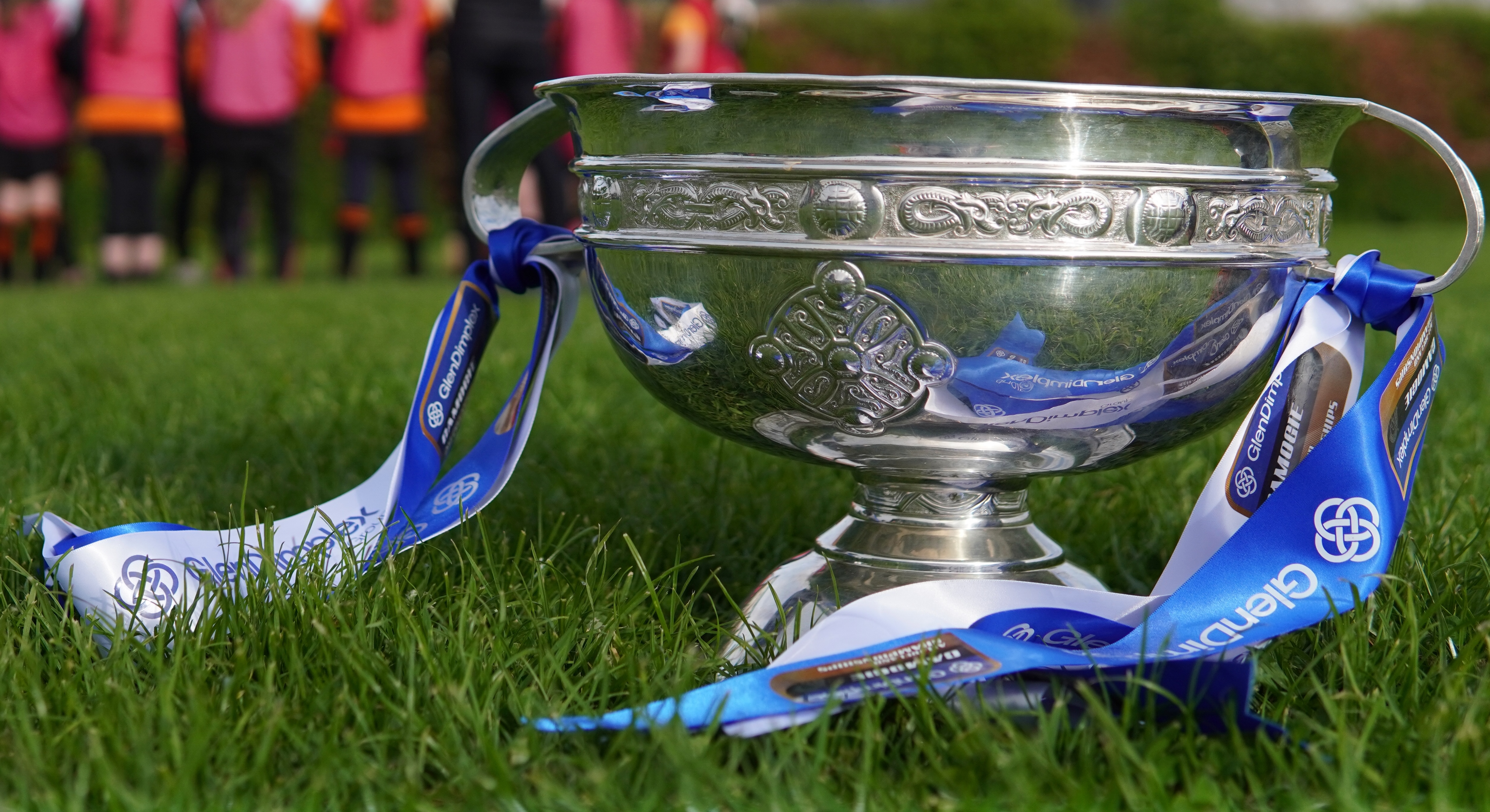
- Irish: Craobh Shinsir Camógaíochta na hÉireann
- Founded: 1932
- Trophy: O'Duffy Cup
- Title holders: Cork (31st title)
- Most titles: Cork (31 titles)
- Sponsors: Glen Dimplex
- TV partner: RTÉ Sport

The All-Ireland Senior Camogie Championship is a competition for inter-county teams in the women's field sport of game of camogie played in Ireland. The series of games are organised by the Camogie Association and are played during the summer months with the All-Ireland Camogie Final being played in Croke Park, Dublin. The prize for the winning team is the O'Duffy Cup.

Cork have been the most successful team (especially in the 21st century), having won 31 championships (and been runners-up 23 times) as at 2026.

The men's equivalent tournament is the All-Ireland Senior Hurling Championship.

== History ==
=== Highlights and incidents ===
Highlights and incidents through the history of the championship include:

- The first final in which Dublin, captained by Association president Máire Gill and helped by two Bray players, beat Galway 3–2 to 0–2 at Galway Sportsfield in the summer of 1933, refereed by Stephen Jordan TD.
- Six goals (of Cork's seven) scored by Kitty Buckley of Old Aloysius for Cork v Dublin n the 1941 final.
- The 1942 final, broadcast on radio for the first time and the 1943 final between Dublin and Cork which set an attendance record of 9,136. In the absence of accurate figures for the 1962 final which may have had a higher attendance, it set a record that stood until 1995.
- The rival 1945 “official” and “unofficial” finals, the result of splits in the association which occurred intermittently between 1938 and 1951, with a number of "official" and "unofficial" competitions, "new" and "old" associations and widespread confusion. Cork had pulled out of the 1944 Munster championship and Dublin pulled out of the 1945 All-Ireland championship over the dispute over male officials.
- The 1946 final in Corrigan Park on front of a gate of £230, in which Antrim defeated Cork, leading to Corrigan Park's depiction by the press as the "home of camogie."
- The 1948 final won by CIÉ club who represented Dublin en masse, as the county board was in dispute with the association.
- The 1949 home final in which Kathleen Cody scored 6-7 of Dublin's 8-7 total in the final.
- Dublin's winning streak, longest in the history of Gaelic games, winning 18 out of 19 titles between 1948 and 1966. They were unbeaten in the Leinster championship between July 26, 1936, and June 2, 1968. Kathleen Mills won 15 All-Ireland medals between 1941 and 1962, Sophie Brack won eight All-Ireland medals in succession and competed in nine successive finals. Úna O'Connor won ten All-Ireland medals.
- Sophie Brack's four goals in the 1951 final.
- The 1955 final between Dublin and Cork, regarded as the greatest of its era, with the performance of Sophie Brack rated as the best individual display.
- Antrim's victory over Dublin in the 1956 semi-final to prevent 9-in-a-row, with Marian Kearns scoring the winning goal. Theresa Cairns, who played for Antrim in the semi-final and final victory over Cork, was just 14.
- Dublin's revenge victory over Antrim in 1957 with a last-minute winning goal from Bríd Reid followed by a dramatic goal line save by Eileen Duffy.
- Judy Doyle's four goals in the 1964 final and five in the 1965 final.
- The extraordinary end to the 1966 semi-final between Dublin and Tipperary when Tipperary, expecting to have won by a point, were told instead that they had lost by a point after a hastily convened Central Council meeting in a nearby hotel.
- The “and Mairéad must score” moment at the end of the 1966 final when Mairéad Carabine doubled on a falling ball to send it inches over the crossbar when a goal would have earned a replay for Antrim against Dublin.
- Sue Cashman's equalising point for Antrim in the 1967 final; they won the replay with a great display by Mairéad McAtamney.
- Wexford's breakthrough victory in 1968
- The display by Liz Garvan in bringing Cork back to the podium in 1970, scoring 3-6 of Cork's 5–7 in the final.
- The 1973 season when the All-Ireland championship reverted to its original format, the open draw.
- Cally Riordan of Cork becoming the only person male or female to win two All Ireland medals in the one day when appearing for both Junior and Senior teams in the 1973 finals.
- Kilkenny's emergence after a replayed final in 1974, with the help of a winning goal by Ursula Grace and a player of the match performance from a young Angela Downey.
- Gretta Quigley's performance in captaining Wexford to victory in 1975 the day after she was married
- Cork's last gasp point from Mary O’Leary, sister of Seánie, to win the 1982 final.
- Angela Downey's famous goal in 1989, scored despite the fact she lost both hurley and skirt as she bore down on goal.
- Kilkenny winning 7 All-Ireland titles in a row in the modern era of camogie from 1985 to 1991.
- Lynn Dunlea's three goals in the 1993 final.
- Linda Mellerick's last minute goal in 1995 to secure Cork's victory over Kilkenny.
- Galway's breakthrough victory in 1996 with two goals from 18-year-old Denise Gilligan
- Irene O'Keeffe's two first half goals in 1998 to help Cork win the first final to be shown live on television.
- Tipperary's breakthrough victory in 1999, with the 14-year-old Claire Grogan on the team, and retention of title the following year with two early goals from Deirdre Hughes and subsequent rivalry with Cork. Tipperary won five All Irelands in six years.
- Six goals exchanged in the 2012 All-Ireland Senior Camogie Championship, which is considered to be one of the best games of all time with Wexford running out winners in the end, with Ursula Jacob scoring 2-7 of Wexford's 3–13.
- Galway's first All-Ireland since 1996 in the 2013 All-Ireland Senior Camogie Championship and Therese Maher's stand out performance as she got her elusive medal after 16 years
- Waterford's first appearance in an All-Ireland senior camogie final in 78 years 2023 All-Ireland Senior Camogie Championship, losing to Cork in the final.

== Teams ==
=== 2026 teams ===
Ten teams competed in the 2026 Senior Championship: Clare, Cork, Dublin, Galway, Kilkenny, Limerick, Offaly, Tipperary, Waterford and Wexford.

County	Province	Position in 2026 championship	Championship titles	Last championship title
Clare	Munster	Quarter-finals	0	—
Cork	Munster	Champion	31	2026
Dublin	Leinster	Relegation playoff winners	26	1984
Galway	Connacht	Runners-up	5	2025
Kilkenny	Leinster	Semi-finals	15	2022
Limerick	Munster	Group stage	0	—
Offaly	Leinster	Group stage	0	—
Tipperary	Munster	Semi-finals	5	2004
Waterford	Munster	Quarter-finals	0	—
Wexford	Leinster	Relegation playoff losers	7	2012

== Format ==
The counties participate in a group series with the top teams progressing to the knock-out stages. The eight teams were divided into two groups of four in 2009. In every other year the teams were placed in a single group of between six and eight teams. The first two championships were played on an open draw basis until in 1934 the championship was changed to the traditional quadro-provincial structure traditional to Gaelic games. Following the withdrawal of Connacht from the inter-provincial senior semi-finals the competition changed to an open-draw knockout system in 1974.

=== Introduction of group system in 2006 ===
The championship structure was changed from a knockout to a round-robin system in 2006. The system was retained despite some initial criticism. An anomaly occurred in four of the first six championships under the new format (2006, 2008, 2010 and 2011) with the defeated All-Ireland finalists beating the eventual champions in the group stages, only to eventually lose to the same opposition in the All-Ireland final:

- In 2006 Tipperary beat Cork by 3–8 to 1–10 in the group stages only to lose the final 0–12 to 0–4
- In 2008, Galway beat Cork 1–9 to 0–8 in the group stages only to lose the final 2–10 to 1–8,
- In 2010, Galway beat Wexford 1–8 to 0–10 in the group stages only to lose the final 1–12 to 1–10
- and in 2011 involving the same counties, Galway beat Wexford by a massive 2–14 to 0–9 in the group stages only to lose the final 2–7 to 1–8.

== Roll of Honour ==
=== Winners by team ===
Cork have won the All-Ireland Senior Camogie Championship the most times, earning a 31st title in 2026. Dublin are in second place in the roll of honour with 26 titles. Dublin won their first championship in 1932 and dominated the competition for the next thirty five years. Between 1948 and 1955 they won eight consecutive titles. Two years later in 1957 Dublin began another great run of success which ended in 1966 with the capturing of their tenth consecutive All-Ireland title. Antrim won a hat-trick of titles from 1945‐1947. For a twenty-year period from 1974 until 1994 the Kilkenny camogie team dominated the championship. Between 1999 and 2006 Tipp won five All-Ireland titles from eight consecutive final appearances.

Six counties - Louth (1934 and 1936), Waterford (1945 and 2023), Down (1948), Derry (1954), Mayo (1959) and Limerick (1980) have appeared in a final without ever winning the O’Duffy Cup, while London appeared in the All-Ireland final "proper", effectively a play-off between the All-Ireland champions and British provincial champions in 1949 and 1950. Three counties, Kildare (1933), Cavan (1940 and 1941) and Clare (1944, and 1978) have contested the All-Ireland semi-final without qualifying for a final. The following is a list of the top county teams by number of wins.

Click on the year for details and team line-outs from each individual championship.

County	Wins	Runner-up	Years won	Years runner-up
Cork	31	23	1934, 1935, 1936, 1939, 1940, 1941, 1970, 1971, 1972, 1973, 1978, 1980, 1982, 1983, 1992, 1993, 1995, 1997, 1998, 2002, 2005, 2006, 2008, 2009, 2014, 2015, 2017, 2018, 2023, 2024, 2026	1938, 1942, 1943, 1955, 1956, 1968, 1974, 1975, 1981, 1987, 1988, 1989, 1991, 1996, 2000, 2003, 2004, 2007, 2012, 2016, 2021, 2022, 2025
Dublin	26	10	1932, 1933, 1937, 1938, 1942, 1943, 1944, 1948, 1949, 1950, 1951, 1952, 1953, 1954, 1955, 1957, 1958, 1959, 1960, 1961, 1962, 1963, 1964, 1965, 1966, 1984	1935, 1941, 1947, 1967, 1976, 1978, 1982, 1983, 1985, 1986
Kilkenny	15	11	1974, 1976, 1977, 1981, 1985, 1986, 1987, 1988, 1989, 1990, 1991, 1994, 2016, 2020, 2022	1970, 1972, 1995, 1999, 2001, 2009, 2013, 2014, 2017, 2018, 2019
Wexford	7	5	1968, 1969, 1975, 2007, 2010, 2011, 2012	1971, 1977, 1990, 1992, 1994
Antrim	6	10	1945, 1946, 1947, 1956, 1967, 1979	1944, 1950, 1951, 1952, 1957, 1963, 1964, 1966, 1969, 1973
Galway	5	18	1996, 2013, 2019, 2021, 2025	1932, 1933, 1937, 1939, 1940, 1946, 1960, 1962, 1993, 1997, 1998, 2008, 2010, 2011, 2015, 2020, 2024, 2026
Tipperary	5	10	1999, 2000, 2001, 2003, 2004	1949, 1953, 1958, 1961, 1965, 1979, 1984, 2002, 2005, 2006
Louth	0	2		1934, 1936
Waterford	0	2		1945, 2023
Down	0	1		1948
Derry	0	1		1954
Mayo	0	1		1959
Limerick	0	1		1980

=== Winners by Province ===
Province	Wins
Leinster	48
Munster	35
Ulster	6
Connacht	5

== All-Ireland Senior Camogie Finals ==
Click on the year for details and team line-outs from each individual championship.

The first numeral in the scoreline of each team is the number of goals scored (equal to 3 points each) and the second numeral is the number of points scored, the figures are combined to determine the winner of a match in Gaelic games. Match duration was raised from 40 minutes to 50 minutes for the 1934 championship and subsequent championships up to 1987, and from 50 minutes to 60 minutes for the 1988 and subsequent championships. The points bar was removed for the 1979 and subsequent championships. Teams were increased from 12-a-side to 15-a-side for the 1999 and subsequent championships.

Year	Date	Winner	Score	R-up	Score	Venue	Attend.	Captain	Referee
1932	30 Jul 1933	Dublin	3-02	Galway	0-02	Galway Sp.	1,000	Máire Gill	Stephen Jordan (Galway)
1933	17 Dec	Dublin	9-02	Galway	4-00	Killester	1,000	Máire Gill	Julian McDonnell (Meath)
1934	28 Oct	Cork	4-03	Louth	1-04	Croke Park	3,500	Kathleen Delea	Tommie Ryan (Tipperary)
1935	24 Nov	Cork	3-04	Dublin	4-00	Cork Ath Gds	2,000	Josie McGrath	Tommie Ryan (Tipperary)
1936	11 Oct	Cork	6-04	Louth	3-03	Croke Park	2,000	Kathleen Cotter	Peg Morris (Galway)
1937	28 Nov	Dublin	9-04	Galway	1-00	Croke Park	5,000	Mary Walsh	Lil Kirby (Cork)
1938	30 Oct	Dublin	5-00	Cork	2-03	Cork Ath Gds	2,000	Emmy Delaney	Peg Morris (Galway)
1939	12 Nov	Cork	6-01	Galway	1-01	Croke Park	5,000	Renee Fitzgerald	Vera Campbell (Tyrone)
1940	13 Oct	Cork	4-01	Galway	2-02	Croke Park	3,000	Lil Kirby	Vera Campbell (Tyrone)
1941	12 Oct	Cork	7-05	Dublin	1-02	Croke Park	4,000	Kathleen Buckley	Peg Morris (Galway)
1942	25 Oct	Dublin	1-02	Cork	1-02	Croke Park	4,000	Peggy Griffin	Seán Gleeson (Tipperary)
Replay	15 Nov	Dublin	4-01	Cork	2-02	Croke Park	6,100	Peggy Griffin	Seán Gleeson (Tipperary)
1943	17 Oct	Dublin	8-00	Cork	1-01	Croke Park	9,136	Peggy Griffin	Vera Campbell (Tyrone)
1944	5 Nov	Dublin	5-04	Antrim	0-00	Corrigan Pk	2,600	Doreen Rogers	Seán Gleeson (Tipperary)
1945	30 Sept	Antrim	5-02	Waterford	3-02	Cappoquin	2,500	Marie O'Gorman	Seán Gleeson (Tipperary)
1946	29 Sept	Antrim	4-01	Galway	2-03	Corrigan Pk	5,000	Marjorie Griffin	Michael Hennessy Clare
1947	9 Nov	Antrim	2-04	Dublin	2-01	Corrigan Pk	5,000	Celia Quinn	Celia Mulholland (Galway)
1948	23 Oct	Dublin	11-04	Down	4-02	Croke Park	1,500	Sophie Brack	James Byrne (Waterford)
1949	30 Oct	Dublin	8-06	Tipperary	4-01	Roscrea	6,000	Doreen Rogers	Celia Mulholland (Galway)
	4 Dec	Dublin	9-03	London	2-02	Croke Park	700	Doreen Rogers	Kathleen O'Duffy (Dublin)
1950	3 Dec	Dublin	6-05	Antrim	4-01	Croke Park	3,000	Pat Raftery	Celia Mulholland (Galway)
	26 Mar	Dublin	8-02	London	1-02	Mitcham	1,300	Pat Raftery
1951	19 Aug	Dublin	8-06	Antrim	4-01	Croke Park	4,000	Sophie Brack	Celia Mulholland (Galway)
1952	10 Aug	Dublin	5-01	Antrim	4-02	Croke Park	4,000	Sophie Brack	Celia Mulholland (Galway)
1953	2 Aug	Dublin	8-04	Tipperary	1-03	Croke Park	4,000	Sophie Brack	Lily Spence (Antrim)
1954	22 Aug	Dublin	10-04	Derry	4-02	Croke Park	2,000	Sophie Brack	Noreen Murphy (Cork)
1955	28 Aug	Dublin	9-02	Cork	5-06	Croke Park	4,192	Sophie Brack	Lily Spence (Antrim)
1956	30 Sept	Antrim	5-03	Cork	4-02	Croke Park	4,100	Madge Rainey	Kathleen O'Duffy (Dublin)
1957	6 Oct	Dublin	3-03	Antrim	3-01	Croke Park	7,000	Eileen Duffy	Noreen Murphy (Cork)
1958	10 Aug	Dublin	5-04	Tipperary	1-01	Croke Park	6,000	Kathleen Mills	Nancy Murray (Antrim)
1959	13 Sept	Dublin	11-06	Mayo	1-03	Croke Park	4,000	Bríd Reid	Nancy Murray (Antrim)
1960	13 Nov	Dublin	6-02	Galway	2-00	Croke Park	2,800	Doreen Brennan	Eithne Neville (Limerick)
1961	8 Oct	Dublin	7-02	Tipperary	4-01	Croke Park	4,000	Gerry Hughes	Maeve Gilroy (Antrim)
1962	12 Aug	Dublin	5-05	Galway	2-00	Croke Park	9,000	Gerry Hughes	Maeve Gilroy (Antrim)
1963	8 Sept	Dublin	7-03	Antrim	2-05	Croke Park	3,500	Úna O'Connor	Gloria Lee (Kildare)
1964	4 Oct	Dublin	7-04	Antrim	3-01	Croke Park	3,500	Úna O'Connor	Vera McDonnell (Mayo)
1965	19 Sept	Dublin	10-01	Tipperary	5-03	Croke Park	3,500	Kathleen Ryder	Nuala Kavanagh (Sligo)
1966	18 Sept	Dublin	2-02	Antrim	0-06	Croke Park	3,500	Kathleen Ryder	Bernie Byrne (Mon’n)
1967	17 Sept	Antrim	4-02	Dublin	4-02	Croke Park	15,879	Sue Cashman	Eithne Neville (Limerick)
Replay	15 Oct	Antrim	3-09	Dublin	4-02	Croke Park	3,000	Sue Cashman	Eithne Neville (Limerick)
1968	15 Sept	Wexford	4-02	Cork	2-05	Croke Park	4,500	Mary Walsh	Nancy Murray (Antrim)
1969	21 Sept	Wexford	4-04	Antrim	4-02	Croke Park	4,500	Bridget Doyle	Lil O'Grady (Cork)
1970	20 Sept	Cork	5-07	Kilkenny	3-02	Croke Park	4,000	Ann Comerford	Nancy Murray (Antrim)
1971	19 Sept	Cork	4-06	Wexford	1-02	Croke Park	4,000	Betty Sugrue	Lily Spence (Antrim)
1972	17 Sept	Cork	2-05	Kilkenny	1-04	Croke Park	4,000	Hannah Dineen	Lily Spence (Antrim)
1973	16 Sept	Cork	2-05	Antrim	3-01	Croke Park	4,000	Marie Costine	Phyllis Breslin (Dublin)
1974	15 Sept	Kilkenny	3-08	Cork	4-05	Croke Park	4,000	Teresa O'Neill	Jane Murphy (Galway)
Replay	6 Oct	Kilkenny	3-03	Cork	1-05	Croke Park	5,000	Teresa O'Neill	Jane Murphy (Galway)
1975	21 Sept	Wexford	4-03	Cork	1-02	Croke Park	4,000	Gretta Quigley	Jane Murphy (Galway)
1976	19 Sept	Kilkenny	0-06	Dublin	1-02	Croke Park	6,000	Mary Fennelly	Jane Murphy (Galway)
1977	18 Sept	Kilkenny	3-04	Wexford	1-03	Croke Park	4,000	Angela Downey	Mary Lynch (Monaghan)
1978	17 Sept	Cork	6-04	Dublin	1-02	Croke Park	4,000	Nancy O'Driscoll	Helena O'Neill (Kilkenny)
1979	9 Sept	Antrim	2-03	Tipperary	1-03	Croke Park	2,900	Mairéad McAtamney	Sheila McNamee (Dublin)
1980	14 Sept	Cork	2-07	Limerick	3-04	Croke Park	2,700	Mary Geaney	Rosina MacManus (Antrim)
Replay	28 Sept	Cork	1-08	Limerick	2-02	Croke Park	3,013	Mary Geaney	Rosina MacManus (Antrim)
1981	13 Sept	Kilkenny	3-09	Cork	3-09	Croke Park	3,000	Liz Neary	Phyllis Breslin (Dublin)
Replay	4 Oct	Kilkenny	1-09	Cork	0-07	Croke Park	3,000	Liz Neary	Phyllis Breslin (Dublin)
1982	26 Sept	Cork	2-07	Dublin	2-06	Croke Park	3,000	Pat Lenihan	Belle O'Loughlin (Down)
1983	25 Sept	Cork	2-05	Dublin	1-06	Croke Park	3,413	Cathy Landers	Kathleen Quinn (Galway)
1984	9 Sept	Dublin	5-09	Tipperary	2-04	Croke Park	4,219	Anne Colgan	Kathleen Quinn (Galway)
1985	15 Sept	Kilkenny	0-13	Dublin	1-05	Croke Park	3,500	Bridie McGarry	Miriam Higgins (Cork)
1986	14 Sept	Kilkenny	2-12	Dublin	2-03	Croke Park	5,000	Liz Neary	Betty Joyce (Cork)
1987	27 Sept	Kilkenny	3-10	Cork	1-07	Croke Park	5,496	Bridie McGarry	Anne Redmond (Dublin)
1988	25 Sept	Kilkenny	4-11	Cork	3-08	Croke Park	4,000	Angela Downey	Belle O'Loughlin (Down)
1989	24 Sept	Kilkenny	3-10	Cork	2-05	Croke Park	3,024	Ann Downey	Kathleen Quinn (Galway)
1990	23 Sept	Kilkenny	1-14	Wexford	0-07	Croke Park	4,000	Breda Holmes	Miriam Murphy (Cork)
1991	22 Sept	Kilkenny	3-08	Cork	0-10	Croke Park	4,000	Angela Downey	Miriam O'Callaghan (Offaly)
1992	27 Sept	Cork	1-20	Wexford	2-06	Croke Park	4,000	Sandie Fitzgibbon	Áine Derham (Dublin)
1993	26 Sept	Cork	3-15	Galway	2-08	Croke Park	5,400	Linda Mellerick	Miriam O'Callaghan (Offaly)
1994	25 Sept	Kilkenny	2-11	Wexford	0-08	Croke Park	5,000	Ann Downey	Maria Pollard (Waterford)
1995	24 Sept	Cork	4-08	Kilkenny	2-10	Croke Park	9,874	Denise Cronin	Áine Derham (Dublin)
1996	22 Sept	Galway	4-08	Cork	1-15	Croke Park	10,235	Imelda Hobbins	Áine Derham (Dublin)
1997	7 Sept	Cork	0-15	Galway	2-05	Croke Park	10,212	Linda Mellerick	Biddy Phillips (Tipperary)
1998	6 Sept	Cork	2-13	Galway	0-15	Croke Park	10,436	Eithne Duggan	John Morrissey (Tipperary)
1999	5 Sept	Tipperary	0-12	Kilkenny	1-08	Croke Park	15,084	Meadhbh Stokes	Áine Derham (Dublin)
2000	3 Sept	Tipperary	2-11	Cork	1-09	Croke Park	12,880	Jovita Delaney	Áine Derham (Dublin)
2001	16 Sept	Tipperary	4-13	Kilkenny	1-06	Croke Park	16,354	Emily Hayden	Áine Derham (Dublin)
2002	15 Sept	Cork	4-09	Tipperary	1-09	Croke Park	13,287	Úna O'Donoghue	Aileen Lawlor (Westmeath)
2003	21 Sept	Tipperary	2-11	Cork	1-11	Croke Park	16,183	Úna O'Dwyer	Áine Derham (Dublin)
2004	19 Sept	Tipperary	2-11	Cork	0-09	Croke Park	24,567	Joanne Ryan	Úna Kearney (Armagh)
2005	18 Sept	Cork	1-17	Tipperary	1-13	Croke Park	14,350	Elaine Burke	John Pender (Kildare)
2006	10 Sept	Cork	0-12	Tipperary	0-04	Croke Park	20,685	Joanne O'Callaghan	Fintan McNamara (Clare)
2007	9 Sept	Wexford	2-07	Cork	1-08	Croke Park	33,154	Mary Leacy	John Morrissey (Tipperary)
2008	14 Sept	Cork	2-10	Galway	1-08	Croke Park	18,727	Cathriona Foley	Eamonn Browne (Tipperary)
2009	13 Sept	Cork	0-15	Kilkenny	0-07	Croke Park	25,924	Amanda Regan	Úna Kearney (Armagh)
2010	12 Sept	Wexford	1-12	Galway	1-10	Croke Park	17,290	Una Leacy	Karl O'Brien (Dublin)
2011	11 Sept	Wexford	2-07	Galway	1-08	Croke Park	14,974	Ursula Jacob	Mike O'Kelly (Cork)
2012	16 Sept	Wexford	3-13	Cork	3-06	Croke Park	15,900	Karen Atkinson	Alan Lagrue (Kildare)
2013	15 Sept	Galway	1-09	Kilkenny	0-07	Croke Park	15,063	Lorraine Ryan	Ger O'Dowd (Limerick)
2014	14 Sept	Cork	2-12	Kilkenny	1-09	Croke Park	12,476	Anna Geary	John Dolan (Clare)
2015	13 Sept	Cork	1-13	Galway	0-09	Croke Park	16,610	Ashling Thompson	Ray Kelly (Kildare)
2016	11 Sept	Kilkenny	1-13	Cork	1-09	Croke Park	20,037	Michelle Quilty	Eamon Cassidy (Derry)
2017	10 Sept	Cork	0-10	Kilkenny	0-09	Croke Park	20,438	Rena Buckley	Owen Elliott (Antrim)
2018	9 Sept	Cork	0-14	Kilkenny	0-13	Croke Park	21,467	Aoife Murray	Eamon Cassidy (Derry)
2019	8 Sept	Galway	3-14	Kilkenny	0-17	Croke Park	24,730	Sarah Dervan	Ray Kelly (Kildare)
2020	12 Dec	Kilkenny	1-14	Galway	1-11	Croke Park	0	Lucinda Gahan	Owen Elliott (Antrim)
2021	12 Sept	Galway	1-15	Cork	1-12	Croke Park		Sarah Dervan	Liz Dempsey (Kilkenny)
2022	7 Aug	Kilkenny	1-13	Cork	1-12	Croke Park	23,426	Aoife Prendergast	Ray Kelly (Kildare)
2023	6 Aug	Cork	5-13	Waterford	0-09	Croke Park	30,191	Amy O'Connor	John Dermody (Meath)
2024	11 Aug	Cork	1-16	Galway	0-16	Croke Park	27,811	Molly Lynch	Liz Dempsey (Kilkenny)
2025	10 Aug	Galway	1-14	Cork	1-13	Croke Park	28,795	Carrie Dolan	Justin Heffernan (Wexford)
2026	9 Aug	Cork	2-14	Galway	0-19	Croke Park	33,419	Méabh Cahalane	G. Donegan (Dublin)

== See also ==
- All-Ireland Senior Hurling Championship
- National Camogie League
- Camogie All Stars Awards
- Ashbourne Cup
