= Hannah Dineen =

Personal information
- Native name: Áine Ní Dhuinnín (Irish)
- Born: County Cork, Ireland

Sport
- Sport: Camogie
- Position: centre back
- Position: centre back
Inter-county
- Years: County
- 1966-78: Cork

Hannah Dineen Cotter is a former camogie player from County Cork in Ireland. She captained the Cork team which won the All Ireland Camogie Championship title in 1972. She previously won All Ireland senior medals in 1970 and 1971 and completed Cork's four in a row in 1973, under her married name Hannah Cotter.

At college level, she represented University College Cork (UCC) in their 1965 Ashbourne Cup win and played again for UCC in the unsuccessful Ashbourne Cup final of 1966. In 1970, she featured on the Cork team that won the All Ireland after 41 years and retained her place for the subsequent four in a row and two more finals over the following eight years before retiring in 1978. Her last appearance was in the 1977-78 National Camogie League final.
