= Peggy Griffin =

Irish camogie player

Personal information
- Native name: Mairéad Ní Ghríofa (Irish)
- Born: Dublin, Ireland

Sport
- Sport: Camogie
- Position: full back
Club*
Years	Club	Apps (scores)
	Coláiste San Dominic	?
Inter-county**
Years	County	Apps (scores)
	Dublin	?
Inter-county titles
- All-Irelands: 4
- * club appearances and scores correct as of (16:31, 30 June 2010 (UTC)). **Inter County team apps and scores correct as of (16:31, 30 June 2010 (UTC)).

Margaret ‘Peggy’ Griffin is a former camogie player, captain of the All Ireland Camogie Championship winning team in 1942 and 1943. She won two further All Ireland senior medals in 1937 and 1938 but missed the 1938 final through injury.
