= Kathleen Cotter =

Irish camogie player

Personal information
- Native name: Caitlín Níc Oitir (Irish)
- Born: County Cork, Ireland

Sport
- Sport: Camogie
- Position: forward
Club*
Years	Club	Apps (scores)
	Mayfield Naomh Brighid	?
Inter-county**
Years	County	Apps (scores)
	Cork	?
- * club appearances and scores correct as of (16:31, 30 June 2010 (UTC)). **Inter County team apps and scores correct as of (16:31, 30 June 2010 (UTC)).

Kathleen Cotter is a former camogie player, captain of the All Ireland Camogie Championship winning team in 1936. She was substituted in the course of the All Ireland final.
