= Kathleen Delea =

Irish camogie player

Kathleen Dunlea (Delea)
Personal information
- Native name: Caitlín Ní Dhuilé (Irish)
- Born: County Cork, Ireland

Sport
- Sport: Camogie
- Position: half forward
Club
- Years: Club
- Muskerry
Inter-county**
Years	County	Apps (scores)
1932-4	Cork	?
- **Inter County team apps and scores correct as of (16:31, 30 June 2010 (UTC)).

Kathleen Dunlea (referred as Delea in newspaper cuttings from the time) is a former camogie player, captain of the All Ireland Camogie Championship winning team in 1934, scoring two goals in Cork's 4-3 to 1–4 victory over Louth.
