= Gerry Hughes (camogie) =

Camogie player

Personal information
- Native name: Betty Nic Aodha (Irish)
- Born: Dublin, Ireland

Sport
- Sport: Camogie
- Position: full back
Club*
Years	Club	Apps (scores)
	CIÉ	?
Inter-county**
Years	County	Apps (scores)
1957-63	Dublin	?
Inter-county titles
- All-Irelands: 6
- * club appearances and scores correct as of (16:31, 30 June 2010 (UTC)). **Inter County team apps and scores correct as of (16:31, 30 June 2010 (UTC)).

Betty‘Gerry’ Hughes is a former camogie player, captain of the All Ireland Camogie Championship winning team in 1961 and 1962.

== Career ==
She won six All Ireland senior medals in all. Her best display may have been Dublin's 8–4 to 1–0 victory over Cork in the 1964 All Ireland semi-final.
