= Old Aloysius Camogie Club =

- Cumann Camogaiochta Old Aloysius
- Founded: 1934
- County: Cork
- Colours: Green and grey

Senior Club Championships
	All Ireland	Munster champions	Cork champions
Camogie:	0	0	16

Playing colours
- Full name: Old Aloysius Camogie Club

Old Aloysius was a camogie club in County Cork. Notable players included Lil Kirby, Peggy Hogg, Kathleen Buckley, Renee Fitzgerald and Mary Moran (both later to become Presidents of the Camogie Association).

== Colours ==
Cork wore the Old Aloysius colours green and grey instead of their red and white tunics in the 1939 All Ireland final to avoid a clash of colours with Galway.

== Achievements ==
- Cork Senior Camogie Championship Winners (16) 1932, 1938, 1939, 1940, 1941, 1943, 1944, 1945, 1946, 1949, 1953, 1955, 1956, 1959, 1960, 1961
