= Anne Colgan =

Irish camogie player

Personal information
- Native name: Áine Ní Cholgan (Irish)
- Born: Liscarroll, County Cork, Ireland

Sport
- Sport: Camogie
- Position: half back
Club*
Years	Club	Apps (scores)
	Celtic	?
Inter-county**
Years	County	Apps (scores)
	Dublin	?
- * club appearances and scores correct as of (16:31, 30 June 2010 (UTC)). **Inter County team apps and scores correct as of (16:31, 30 June 2010 (UTC)).

Anne Colgan is a former camogie player, captain of the All Ireland Camogie Championship winning team in 1984.

== Career ==
Promoted to the senior team after winning junior League honours with Dublin in 1982 she played at right back. After Dublin's All Ireland victory she retired from the game, returning briefly in 1988–89.
