= Gretta Kehoe-Quigley =

Gretta Quigley
Personal information
- Native name: Mairéad Uí Choigligh (Irish)
- Born: Wexford, Ireland

Sport
- Sport: Camogie
- Position: centre back
Club*
Years	Club	Apps (scores)
	Cloughbawn-Adamstown	?
Inter-county**
Years	County	Apps (scores)
1969-1975	Wexford	?
- * club appearances and scores correct as of (16:31, 30 June 2010 (UTC)). **Inter County team apps and scores correct as of (16:31, 30 June 2010 (UTC)).

Gretta Kehoe-Quigley is a former camogie player, captain of the All Ireland Camogie Championship winning team in 1975, the day after she was married to Ray Quigley, the trainer of her club camogie team.

== Career ==
She made her debut with the Wexford junior team in 1969 and played in the 1972 All-Ireland final. She made her senior debut in the 1972 Leinster championship, in which Wexford were narrowly beaten 6–4 to 5–6 in the final by Kilkenny. She won a Leinster senior championship medal in 1974.

== Family background ==
She is one of three sisters from Palace, Poulpeasty in County Wexford, who won All Ireland medals together in 1975, the others were Kit Codd and Bridget Doyle, winner of the 1975 B+I Star of the Year award. Two other sisters, Annie and Josie both played on Wexford's 1968 All Ireland winning team. Two other sisters, Annie and Josie both played on Wexford's 1968 All Ireland winning team, and two more, seven in all, also played inter-county for Wexford.
