= Elmville, Ohio =

Unincorporated community in Ohio, US

Coordinates: 39°03′54″N 83°27′07″W

Elmville is an unincorporated community in Highland County, in the US state of Ohio.

== History ==
A post office called Elmville was established in 1855, and remained in operation until 1905. The community most likely was named for a nearby grove of elm trees.
