= Lil Kirby =

Irish camogie player (1921–1987)

Lil Kirby, Éilís Ní Chiarbha
- Kirby in 1937 as UCC captain

5th President of the Camogie Association
- In office 1942–1945
- Succeeded by: Agnes Hennessy

Personal details
- Born: 24 January 1921 Cork, Ireland
- Died: 30 November 1987 (aged 66) Bandon, Ireland
- Spouse: David Crowley

Elizabeth "Lil" Kirby (Irish: Éilís Ní Chiarbha; 1921–1987) was a camogie player who won six All Ireland medals and became fifth president of the Camogie Association.

== Early life ==
She was the daughter of DW Kirby of Carrigpeter, Bishopstown Park, Model Farm Road, Cork. She went to University College Cork, and played on Ashbourne Cup camogie teams, joined Sunday's Well swimming club (winning the ocean swim from Crosshaven to Ocean's Point in 1940), Muskerry golf club, and became captain of her local Reserve Defence Forces during The Emergency. Members of Old Aloysians camogie club formed an archway of hurleys when she married David Crowley on 18 April 1941 in the Honan Chapel, University College Cork.

== Playing career ==
She won All Ireland medals at midfield in 1934, 1935, 1936, 1939, 1940 and 1941, when she captained the team. She also refereed the 1937 All Ireland final between Dublin and Galway. Her record of six All Ireland medals was not equalled until 1953 and not by a Cork player until Pat Maloney and Marion McCarthy both won their sixth medal in 1980.

== Achievements ==
Lil Kirby was a decorated player. She is one of thirteen players to have six All-Ireland camogie medals. These are from the years 1934, 1935, 1936, 1938, 1940 and 1941. She captained the team in 1940, leading them to success over Galway in the final. She captained then UCC university team and led them to win the Ashbourne Cup in the year 1936. She also captained the team in 1937, where they were beaten by UCD in the final. The Ashbourne Cup is an Irish inter-varsity camogie championship played every year, the cup for which was donated by Lord Ashbourne in 1915. Kirby also refereed matches during the course of her career including the 1937 All Ireland Final between Dublin and Galway as well as a senior match between Glen Rovers and Barryroc in 1936. Kirby was the first female chair of the Cork County Board, a position she held from the year 1938 to 1942. According to the Camogie Association's website, the board "benefited from her firm and capable leadership". Kirby was also the first woman to become president of the Camogie Association. She held this position from 1942 to 1945 inclusive. She took on this position soon after a dispute occurred between the Cork and Dublin county boards. This dispute was over the GAA banning GAA players from playing "foreign" sports, such as football and hockey. Kirby was also described as a "top class swimmer" and swam over two miles from White Bay to Graball Bay across Cork Harbour in 1931. She was the first woman to finish the swim, and second overall.

== Later life ==
She became involved in the Irish Countrywoman's Association and continued to play whist after her husband died in 1975.
