= O'Duffy Cup =

Trophy for the sport of camogie

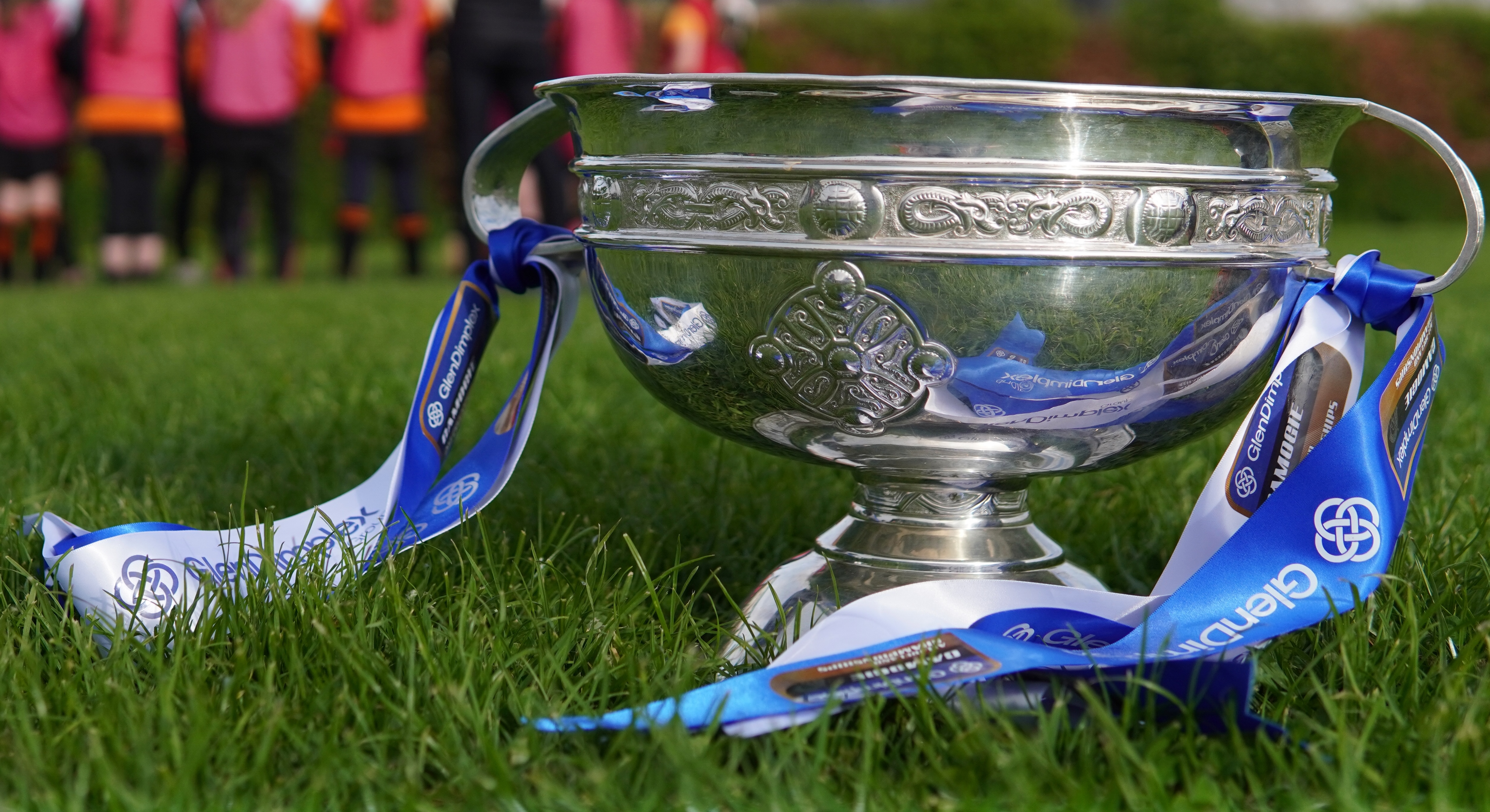
The O'Duffy Cup

The O'Duffy Cup (Irish: Corn Uí Dúbhthaigh) is the prize presented to the winners of the All-Ireland Senior Camogie Championship.

The cup is named after Seán O'Duffy, a member and administrator of the Kilmacud Crokes club in Dublin, who presented the trophy to the sport's governing body, the Camogie Association of Ireland, now the Camogie Association or in 1932.

An updated cup, modelled on the Ardagh Chalice, was presented in September 2007, valued at €25,000, with Wexford captain Mary Leacy the first player to lift it. Wexford were crowned champions for the first time since 1975.
