= Mairéad McAtamney =

Irish camogie player

Máiréad McAtamney
Personal information
- Born: Portglenone, County Antrim

Sport
- Sport: Camogie
- Position: Midfield
Club
- Years: Club
- Portglenone
Inter-county
- Years: County
- 1958-1983: Antrim
Inter-county titles
- All-Irelands: 2

Máiréad McAtamney-Magill (born c. 1944 in Portglenone, County Antrim) is a retired Irish sportsperson. She played camogie with her local club Portglenone and with the Antrim senior inter-county team from 1958 until 1983. McAtamney captained Antrim to the All-Ireland title in 1979.

== Sources ==
- Corry, Eoghan, The GAA Book of Lists (Hodder Headline Ireland, 2005).
- Donegan, Des, The Complete Handbook of Gaelic Games (DBA Publications Limited, 2005).
- Fullam, Brendan, Captains of the Ash, (Wolfhound Press, 2002).
