= Judy Doyle =

Irish camogie player

Personal information
- Native name: Iúidít Ní Dhubhgháil (Irish)
- Born: Dublin, Ireland

Sport
- Sport: Camogie
- Position: forward
Clubs*
Years	Club	Apps (scores)
	CIÉ & Naomh Aoife	?
Inter-county**
Years	County	Apps (scores)
1960-1973	Dublin	?
Inter-county titles
- All-Irelands: 6
- * club appearances and scores correct as of (16:31, 30 June 2010 (UTC)). **Inter County team apps and scores correct as of (16:31, 30 June 2010 (UTC)).

Judy Doyle is an Irish former camogie player who was one of the leading goalscorers of her generation, the scorer of three goals for Dublin against Tipperary in the 1961 All Ireland final, four goals for Dublin against Antrim in the 1964 All Ireland final and five goals for Dublin against Tipperary in the 1965 All Ireland final.

She won six All Ireland senior medals in all. She won six All Ireland medals from 1961 to 1966 and five Gael Linn Cup medals.

== Career ==
She first played for Dublin in the 1960 championship, scoring four goals against Laois in her first Leinster final, and quickly struck up a lethal partnership with Úna O’Connor, with whom she had an uncanny relationship on the field of play.

Judy scored more goals in the Gael Linn Cup series than any other player in history. Including three of Leinster's seven in the 1968 final and three of Leinster’s twelve in the 1970 final, both against Ulster, and four goals in the 1969 and 1971 semi-finals.

She scored three goals for Dublin against Mayo in the 1967 All Ireland semi-final. Usually a forward, she played in goal for Naomh Aoife against Austin Stacks in a Dublin League match that Naomh Aoife won by a point to nil in 1971.

She scored the first of Naomh Aoife’s four goals in their 4-1 to 0-1 championship final breakthrough victory over Celtic in 1966. In

1967 she scored 7-2 of Naomh Aoife’s total of 10-4 in a Dublin League match against UCD. In 1973 she was recalled to the Dublin team for their championship campaign.

== See also ==
- List of Camogie players
