= CIE Camogie Club =

CIE
- Córas Iompair Éireann
- Founded: 1934
- County: Dublin
- Colours: Wine and green
- Grounds: Inchicore
Standard
colours

Senior Club Championships
	All Ireland	Leinster champions	Dublin champions
Camogie:	1	0	4

Córas Iompair Éireann CIE Camogie Club, (Córas Iompair Éireann Camogie Club originally Great Southern Railways Camogie Club) was one of the most successful clubs in the history of the Irish women's field sport of camogie.

== 1948 final ==
They supplied all of the members of the Dublin team that won the All-Ireland Senior Camogie Championship of 1948 and dominated the Dublin senior championship for part of an era when Dublin won 18 All Ireland titles in 19 years.

== Players ==
Notable members include Sophie Brack, Kathleen Mills, Gerry Hughes, Kathleen Cody, Judy Doyle, Mona Walsh and Elizabeth McNicholl.

== Origin ==
The club grew out of the Great Southern Railways Athletic Union. Two pence per week were deducted from the worker's wages to go towards the financing of the sports activities in the Railway. The families of members were allowed avail of the facilities. In 1938 this facility attracted to the club the daughters of two men who worked at Inchicore railway works, Kathleen Cody and Kathleen Mills

== Promotion ==
The club was promoted from intermediate in 1938 and defeated senior champions UCD in their first match, all their scores being scored by "the young Kathleen Cody," who was 14 at the time. Within weeks another 14-year-old, Kathleen Mills played for the juniors and was promoted to the senior team for her second match.

== Challenge matches ==
Much of the success of the GSR team was based on their use of free rail travel facilities to play challenge matches in other parts of the country, often against full-strength teams. They beat full strength county teams from Antrim and Meath in 1940.

== Greatest era ==
In 1951 won the three most prized trophies in club camogie at the time, the Isle of Man cup, the Dublin league and the Dublin championship, a feat never before accomplished by any single team in one season. They were unbeaten for two years 1953-55.

== Disunity ==
The club disaffiliated from Dublin County Board during two periods of unrest in the 1940s and affiliated directly to Central Council o the Camogie Association, in 1939-41 and 1945-48. This meant that the club had little or no opposition in Dublin or Leinster when their one-club selection represented Dublin, most famously to contest the Al Ireland finals of 1941 and 1947 and winning the All Ireland title in 1948. The club even set up an alternative Dublin county board in 1947 but were asked by central Council not to pursue this policy.

== Grounds ==
Their grounds were at Inchicore.
