= List of All-Ireland Senior Camogie Championship finals =

This page is a list of final matches of the All-Ireland Senior Camogie Championship, the premier inter-county competition in camogie.

Season	Winner	Score	Runners–up	Venue	Attendance
1932	Dublin	3-2 – 0-2	Galway	Galway Sportsgrounds, Galway	4,000
1933	Dublin	9-2 – 4-0	Galway	Parnell Park, Killester	1,000
1934	Cork	4-3 – 1-4	Louth	Croke Park, Dublin	3,500
1935	Cork	3-4 – 4-0	Dublin	Cork Athletic Grounds, Cork	2,000
1936	Cork	6-4 – 3-3	Louth	Croke Park, Dublin	2,000
1937	Dublin	9-4 – 1-0	Galway	Parnell Park, Killester	1,000
1938	Dublin	5-0 – 2-3	Cork	Cork Athletic Grounds, Cork	5,000
1939	Cork	6-1 – 1-1	Galway	Croke Park, Dublin	5,000
1940	Cork	4-1 – 2-2	Galway	Croke Park, Dublin	3,000
1941	Cork	7-5 – 1-2	Galway	Croke Park, Dublin	4,000
1942	Dublin	1-2 – 1-2	Cork	University College Cork, Cork	4,000
1942	Dublin	4-1 – 2-2	Cork	Croke Park, Dublin	6,100
1943	Dublin	8-0 – 1-1	Cork	Croke Park, Dublin	9,136
1944	Dublin	5-4 – 0-0	Antrim	Corrigan Park, Belfast	2,600
1945	Antrim	5-2 – 3-2	Waterford	Cappoquin GAA Grounds, Cappoquin	2,500
1946	Antrim	4-1 – 2-3	Galway	Corrigan Park, Belfast	5,000
1947	Antrim	2-4 – 2-1	Dublin	Corrigan Park, Belfast	5,000
1948	Dublin	11-4 – 4-2	Down	Croke Park, Dublin	1,500
1949	Dublin	8-6 – 4-1	Tipperary	St. Cronan's Park, Roscrea	1,200
1950	Dublin	8-2 – 1-2	London	Mitcham, London	1,300
1951	Dublin	5-1 – 4-2	Antrim	Croke Park, Dublin	4,000
1952	Dublin	8-6 – 4-1	Antrim	Croke Park, Dublin	4,000
1953	Dublin	8-4 – 1-3	Tipperary	Croke Park, Dublin	4,000
1954	Dublin	10-4 – 1-2	Derry	Croke Park, Dublin	2,000
1955	Dublin	9-2 – 5-6	Cork	Croke Park, Dublin	4,192
1956	Antrim	5-3 – 4-2	Cork	Croke Park, Dublin	4,100
1957	Dublin	3-3 – 3-1	Antrim	Croke Park, Dublin	7,000
1958	Dublin	5-4 – 1-1	Tipperary	Croke Park, Dublin	53,357
1959	Dublin	11-6 – 1-3	Mayo	Croke Park, Dublin	4,000
1960	Dublin	6-2 – 2-0	Galway	Croke Park, Dublin	2,800
1961	Dublin	7-2 – 4-1	Tipperary	Croke Park, Dublin	4,000
1962	Dublin	5-5 – 2-0	Galway	Croke Park, Dublin	3,000
1963	Dublin	10-4 – 1-2	Derry	Croke Park, Dublin	3,500
1964	Dublin	7-4 – 3-1	Antrim	Croke Park, Dublin	3,500
1965	Dublin	10-1 – 5-3	Tipperary	Croke Park, Dublin	3,500
1966	Dublin	2-2 – 0-6	Antrim	Croke Park, Dublin	3,500
1967	Antrim	4-2 – 4-2	Dublin	Croke Park, Dublin	3,500
1967	Antrim	3-9 – 4-2	Dublin	Croke Park, Dublin	2,000
1968	Wexford	4-2 – 2-5	Cork	Croke Park, Dublin	4,500
1969	Wexford	4-4 – 4-2	Antrim	Croke Park, Dublin	4,500
1970	Cork	5-7 – 3-2	Kilkenny	Croke Park, Dublin	4,500
1971	Cork	4-6 – 1-2	Wexford	Croke Park, Dublin	4,000
1972	Cork	2-5 – 1-4	Kilkenny	Croke Park, Dublin	4,500
1973	Cork	2-5 – 3-1	Antrim	Croke Park, Dublin	4,000
1974	Kilkenny	3-8 – 4-5	Cork	Croke Park, Dublin	4,000
1974	Kilkenny	3-3 – 1-5	Cork	Croke Park, Dublin	5,000
1975	Wexford	4-4 – 4-2	Antrim	Croke Park, Dublin	4,500
1976	Wexford	4-3 – 1-2	Cork	Croke Park, Dublin	6,000
1977	Kilkenny	3-4 – 1-3	Wexford	Croke Park, Dublin	4,000
1978	Cork	6-4 – 1-2	Dublin	Croke Park, Dublin	4,000
1979	Antrim	2-3 – 1-3	Tipperary	Croke Park, Dublin	2,900
1980	Cork	2-7 – 3-4	Limerick	Croke Park, Dublin	2,700
1980	Cork	1-8 – 2-2	Limerick	Croke Park, Dublin	3,013
1981	Kilkenny	3-9 – 3-9	Cork	Croke Park, Dublin	3,000
1981	Kilkenny	1-9 – 0-7	Cork	Croke Park, Dublin	3,000
1982	Cork	2-7 – 2-6	Dublin	Croke Park, Dublin	3,000
1983	Cork	2-5 – 1-6	Dublin	Croke Park, Dublin	3,413
1984	Dublin	5-9 – 1-4	Tipperary	Croke Park, Dublin	4,219
1985	Kilkenny	0-13 – 1-5	Dublin	Croke Park, Dublin	4,500
1986	Kilkenny	2-12 – 2-3	Dublin	Croke Park, Dublin	5,000
1987	Kilkenny	3-10 – 1-7	Cork	Croke Park, Dublin	5,496
1988	Kilkenny	4-11 – 3-8	Cork	Croke Park, Dublin	4,000
1989	Kilkenny	3-10 – 2-5	Cork	Croke Park, Dublin	3,024
1990	Kilkenny	1-14 – 0-7	Wexford	Croke Park, Dublin	4,000
1991	Kilkenny	3-8 – 0-10	Cork	Croke Park, Dublin	4,000
1992	Cork	1-20 – 2-6	Wexford	Croke Park, Dublin	4,000
1993	Cork	3-15 – 2-8	Galway	Croke Park, Dublin	5,400
1994	Kilkenny	2-11 – 0-8	Wexford	Croke Park, Dublin	5,000
1995	Cork	4-8 – 2-10	Wexford	Croke Park, Dublin	4,000
1996	Galway	4-8 – 1-16	Cork	Croke Park, Dublin	4,000
1997	Cork	0-15 – 2-5	Galway	Croke Park, Dublin	10,212
1998	Cork	2-13 – 0-15	Galway	Croke Park, Dublin	10,436
1999	Tipperary	0-12 – 1-8	Kilkenny	Croke Park, Dublin	15,084
2000	Tipperary	2-11 – 1-9	Cork	Croke Park, Dublin	12,880
2001	Tipperary	4-13 – 1-6	Kilkenny	Croke Park, Dublin	16,354
2002	Cork	4-9 – 1-9	Tipperary	Croke Park, Dublin	13,287
2003	Tipperary	2-11 – 1-11	Cork	Croke Park, Dublin	16,183
2004	Tipperary	1-14 – 0-7	Cork	Croke Park, Dublin	24,567
2005	Cork	1-17 – 1-13	Tipperary	Croke Park, Dublin	14,350
2006	Cork	0-12 – 0-4	Tipperary	Croke Park, Dublin	20,685
2007	Wexford	2-7 – 1-8	Cork	Croke Park, Dublin	33,154
2008	Cork	2-10 – 1-8	Galway	Croke Park, Dublin	18,727
2009	Cork	0-15 – 0-7	Kilkenny	Croke Park, Dublin	25,924
2010	Wexford	1-12 – 1-10	Galway	Croke Park, Dublin	17,290
2011	Wexford	2-7 – 1-8	Galway	Croke Park, Dublin	14,974
2012	Wexford	3-13 – 3-6	Cork	Croke Park, Dublin	15,900
2013	Galway	1-9 – 0-7	Kilkenny	Croke Park, Dublin	15,063
2014	Cork	2-12 – 1-9	Kilkenny	Croke Park, Dublin	12,473
2015	Cork	1-13 – 0-9	Galway	Croke Park, Dublin	16,610
2016	Kilkenny	1-13 – 1-9	Cork	Croke Park, Dublin	20,037
2017	Cork	0-10 – 0-9	Kilkenny	Croke Park, Dublin	20,438
2018	Cork	0-14 – 0-13	Kilkenny	Croke Park, Dublin	21,453
2019	Galway	3-14 – 0-17	Kilkenny	Croke Park, Dublin	24,730
2020	Kilkenny	1-14 – 1-11	Galway	Croke Park, Dublin	0
2021	Galway	1-15 – 1-12	Cork	Croke Park, Dublin	
2022	Kilkenny	1-13 – 1-12	Cork	Croke Park, Dublin	23,426
2023	Cork	5-13 – 0-8	Waterford	Croke Park, Dublin	30,191
2024	Cork	1-16 – 0-16	Galway	Croke Park, Dublin	27,811
2025	Galway	1-14 – 1-13	Cork	Croke Park, Dublin	28,795
2026	Cork	2-14 – 0-19	Galway	Croke Park, Dublin	33,419
