= 1951 All-Ireland Senior Camogie Championship =

Camogie championship

All-Ireland Senior Camogie Championship 1951
Winners
- Champions: Dublin (11th title)
- Captain: Sophie Brack

Runners-up
- Runners-up: Antrim
- Captain: Sarah O'Neill

Other
- Matches played: 2

The 1951 All-Ireland Senior Camogie Championship was the high point of the 1951 season in Camogie. The championship was won by Dublin who defeated Antrim by a 17-point margin in the final. The final was played at Croke Park.

== Structure ==
London entered the championship at the quarter-final stage and beat Galway 3–4 to 2-2, with strong performances from Nora Scully, Kathleen Waters, Noreen Collins and Bridie Ennis. They lost heavily in the semi-final at New Eltham with Deirdre O’Gorman, Moya Forde and Peg Dooey leading Antrim's effort.

== Final ==
Sophie Brack scored 4-2 for Dublin in the final. Unaccustomed to the surroundings of Croke Park surroundings the Antrim team did not find their feet until near the end of the first half, by which time Dublin had run up a big score and led 5–3 to 0–1. Antrim did better after half time, their forwards played with more confidence and scored three goals in the opening minutes of the second half and four in all, two from Mary McKeever, and one each from Sarah O'Neill and Madge Rainey. The match was played on front of what was described as a “large attendance” and according to the Irish Independent

“The colours were lavishly displayed by the supporters, the sky-blue of Dublin contrasting with the saffron and white of the Ulster supporters.”

The newspaper commented:

“In Eileen Duffy the winners had a goalkeeper whose anticipation and clearances must surely have disconcerted the most goal hungry forward line. At times she was inspired, one of her saves being superb.”

The Irish Press reports:

“The game as a whole failed to reach the heights expected following last year’s great tussle between the teams. Antrim in particular were disappointing, their defence being very lax, especially in the first half.”

=== Final stages ===
Semi-Final

| Antrim | 5-1 – 0-1 | London |

New Eltham

Semi-Final

| Dublin | 6-6 – 0-1 | Tipperary |

Roscrea

August 19
Final

| Dublin | 8-6 – 4-1 | Antrim |

Croke Park, Dublin

| Dublin | Antrim |

DUBLIN:
| GK | 1 | Eileen Duffy (Celtic) |
| FB | 2 | Nan Mahon |
| RWB | 3 | Carmel Walsh (CIÉ) |
| CB | 4 | Deborah Dunne (Austin Stacks) |
| LWB | 5 | Mona Walsh |
| MF | 6 | Joan Cosgrave |
| MF | 7 | Kathleen Cody (CIÉ) (0-3) |
| MF | 8 | Kathleen Mills (CIÉ) (0-1) |
| RWF | 9 | Patsy Cooney (1-0) |
| CF | 10 | Annie Donnelly (1-0) |
| LWF | 11 | Eileen Bourke (UCD) (2-0) |
| FF | 12 | Sophie Brack (CIÉ) (Capt) (4-2) |

ANTRIM:
| GK | 1 | Pat Rafferty |
| FB | 2 | Nancy Murray |
| RWB | 3 | Moya Forde |
| CB | 4 | Deirdre O’Gorman |
| LWB | 5 | Geraldine Swindles |
| MF | 6 | Ethna Dougan (0-1) |
| MF | 7 | Sue McMullen |
| MF | 8 | Mary McGarry |
| RWF | 9 | Madge Rainey (1-0) |
| CF | 10 | Sarah O’Neill (1-0) |
| LWF | 11 | Mary McKeever (2-0) |
| FF | 12 | Mary Rua McGarry |

MATCH RULES

- 50 minutes
- Replay if scores level
- Maximum of 3 substitutions

== See also ==
- All-Ireland Senior Hurling Championship
- Wikipedia List of Camogie players
- National Camogie League
- Camogie All Stars Awards
- Ashbourne Cup

| Preceded by All-Ireland Senior Camogie Championship 1950 | All-Ireland Senior Camogie Championship; 1932 – present | Succeeded by All-Ireland Senior Camogie Championship 1952 |
