= 1955 All-Ireland Senior Camogie Championship final =

1955 All-Ireland Senior Camogie Final
- Event: All-Ireland Senior Camogie Championship 1955
Dublin	Cork
9-2	5-6
- Date: 28 August 1955
- Venue: Croke Park, Dublin
- Referee: Lily Spence (Antrim)
- Attendance: 4,192

The 1955 All-Ireland Senior Camogie Championship Final was the 23rd All-Ireland Final and the deciding match of the 1955 All-Ireland Senior Camogie Championship, an inter-county camogie tournament for the top teams in Ireland.

This final is regarded as one of the greatest in camogie history. Cork took an early lead, but trailed 3–2 to 1–4 at half-time. Dublin powered through to win by eight points. Top scorers for Dublin were Sophie Brack and Frances Maher(three goals each), while Noreen Duggan scored 3-2 for Cork.
