= 1949 All-Ireland Senior Camogie Championship =

Camogie championship

All-Ireland Senior Camogie Championship 1949
Tournament details
- Date: 4 December

Winners
- Champions: Dublin (9th title)
- Captain: Doreen Rogers

Runners-up
- Runners-up: Tipperary
- Captain: Madeline Bowers

The 1949 All-Ireland Senior Camogie Championship was the high point of the 1949 season in Camogie. The championship was won by Dublin, who defeated London by a 22-point margin in the final "proper" at Croke Park having earlier defeated Tipperary by a 17-point margin in a poorly attended home final in Roscrea. They were to play London in a final "proper" on 4 December, which fell through.

== Structure ==
It was clear that CIÉ clubmates Kathleen Cody and Sophie Brack had hit their top form together throughout the championship. When Dublin beat Wexford 8–7 to nil in the Leinster final at New Ross the Sophie Brack scored six goals and Kathleen Cody scored 0–7, Doreen Rogers and Pat Rafferty scoring the other goals. They then beat Down by 3–4 to 1–3 at Kilclief, with the help of an own goal by a Down defender and goals by Kathleen O'Keeffe and Sophie Brack. Dublin had just two surviving players from their controversial 1948 side, Kathleen Cody and Sophie Brack Tipperary beat Galway 3–2 to 1–3 in the All Ireland semi-final at Roscrea before 1,000 spectators and a match described as "the best in many years".

The game was one of the best seen in the championship this year and the net minding of Kathleen Griffin for the visitors won rounds of applause.

Of particular note was the exchange of goals midway through the first half by May Hynes of Tipperary and Scully of Galway.

== Final ==
Kathleen Cody scored a soft goal in the opening minute of the final at St Cronan's Park in Roscrea and ended up scoring a total of 6–7 for Dublin, all but two goals of Dublin's total of 8–7. The Irish Independent reported:

A feature of the game was the outstanding individual play of Kathleen Cody, who several times went right through the Tipperary defence from midfield. Tipperary were not able to cope with Dublin in any section of the field and soft scores in the first half left Dublin ahead 7–4 to 1–1 at half time.

The Irish Press reported,

There was no denying that Dublin were the better side. They combined much better and were more accurate in shooting. They were vastly superior in the first half and had the game won at the interval. This time Sophie Brack scored six goals and Kathleen Cody scored 2–3.

The gate receipts at Roscrea were wiped out by the expenses incurred in staging the event, including a large bill submitted by local stewards. Radio Éireann did not broadcast the final because of the expense of taking a unit to Roscrea.

== Final proper ==
London defeated Lancashire "after a hard struggle" and Warwickshire to qualify for the All Ireland final as British champions, a match in which Dublin had a facile win over London. The Irish Press reported of the match:

Were it not for an obvious easing off on the part of the forwards in the second half their final score would have been a far more impressive one. The standard of play was not as low as the scores would seem to indicate and an otherwise uninteresting game was at times relieved by some bright passages of play. Chief interest centred on the brilliant individual displays of Noreen Collins of London and Kathleen Cody of Dublin, who, in particular, delighting the crowds with some wonderful scores and delightful solo runs.

Three Waters sisters played for London in the final. Dublin and London teams were entertained in the CIE hall in Phibsboro after the match on Sunday evening after the final. Agnes O'Farrelly sent a message to the teams:

It is heartening to think of our kindred from England returning to the home of their people as trained athletes.

The match had taken place less than eighteen months after the revival of camogie in Britain. Matches in London were played on a full-sized hurling pitch, leaving their players with the additional handicap of adapting to the smaller space.

=== Final stages ===
October 2
Semi-Final

Tipperaryy	3–2 – 1–3	Galway

Roscrea

October 16
Semi-Final

Dublin	3–4 – 1–3	Down

Kilclief

October 30
Home Final

Dublin	8–7 – 4–1	Tipperary

Roscrea

December 4
Final Proper

Dublin	9–3 – 2–2	London

Croke Park

== Home final: Dublin 8–7 Tipperary 4–1 ==
Dublin	Tipperary

Dublin:
GK	1	Eileen Duffy (Celtic)
FB	2	Anna Young (Celtic)
RWB	3	Patricia O'Connor (Celtic)
CB	4	Rose Fletcher (Scoil Bríghde)
LWB	5	Mona Walsh (Eoghan Rua)
MF	6	Nancy Caffrey (Eoghan Rua)
MF	7	Kathleen Cody (CIÉ) (6–7)
MF	8	Mary Kelly (Celtic)
RWF	9	Kathleen O'Keeffe (Optimists) (1–0)
CF	10	Pat Raftery (Col San Dominic)
LWF	11	Doreen Rogers (Austin Stacks) (Capt) (1–0)
FF	12	Sophie Brack (CIÉ).

Tipperary:
GK	1	Marie Flanagan (Roscrea)
FB	2	Terry Griffin (Roscrea)
RWB	3	Mary Ann O'Brien (Roscrea) (1–1)
CB	4	Madeline Bowers (Roscrea) (Capt)
LWB	5	Kitty Gleeson (Loughmore)
MF	6	Kitty Callanan (Loughmore)
MF	7	Mary Power (Clonmel)
MF	8	Joan Maher (Roscrea)
RWF	9	Eileen Walsh (Loughmore) (2-0)
CF	10	May Hynes (Roscrea) (substituted off) 36'
LWF	11	Maura Curran (Carrick-on-Suir)
FF	12	Margaret Walsh (Loughmore)
Substitute:
LCF		Lizzie Aherne (Roscrea) 1–0 (substituted in) 36'

Match Rules

- 50 minutes
- Replay if scores level
- Maximum of 3 substitutions

== Final "proper": Dublin 9–3 London 2–2 ==
Dublin	London

Dublin:
GK	1	Eileen Duffy (Celtic)
FB	2	Anna Young (Celtic)
RWB	3	Patricia O'Connor (Celtic)
CB	4	Rose Fletcher (Scoil Bríghde)
LWB	5	Mona Walsh (Eoghan Rua)
MF	6	Kathleen Cody (CIÉ) 2–3
MF	7	Nancy Caffrey (Eoghan Rua)
MF	8	Rose Blake (Austin Stacks)
RWF	9	Mary Kelly (Celtic) Kathleen O'Keeffe (Optimists)
CF	10	Kathleen O'Keeffe (Optimists)
LWF	11	Sophie Brack (CIÉ) 6–0
FF	12	Doreen Rogers (Austin Stacks) 1–0(Capt)

London:
GK	1	Nora Waters Cuchulainns & Tipperary
FB	2	Bridie Ennis Cuchulainns & Tipperary
RWB	3	J Keohane St Monica's & Tipperary
CB	4	Kathleen O'Reilly Sarsfields & Meath
LWB	5	Kathleen Waters Cuchulainns & Tipperary
MF	6	Brigid Kelly Sarsfields & Galway
MF	7	A Lee Cuchulainns & Cavan
MF	8	M Kelly 1–0 St Monica's & Kilkenny
RWF	9	Noreen Collins Sarsfields & Kerry 0–2
CF	10	M Ward & Sarsfields & Meath 1–0
LWF	11	Lil Ward Sarsfields & Meath (captain)
FF	12	I Cotter Cuchulainns & Cork

Match Rules

- 50 minutes
- Replay if scores level
- Maximum of 3 substitutions

== See also ==
- All-Ireland Senior Hurling Championship
- Wikipedia List of Camogie players
- National Camogie League
- Camogie All Stars Awards
- Ashbourne Cup

Preceded by 1948 All-Ireland Senior Camogie Championship	All-Ireland Senior Camogie Championship; 1932–present	Succeeded by 1950 All-Ireland Senior Camogie Championship
