= 1951 All-Ireland Senior Camogie Championship final =

1951 All-Ireland Senior Camogie Final
- Event: All-Ireland Senior Camogie Championship 1951
Dublin	Antrim
8-6	4-1
- Date: 19 August 1951
- Venue: Croke Park, Dublin
- Referee: Celia Mulholland (Galway)
- Attendance: 4,000

The 1951 All-Ireland Senior Camogie Championship Final was the twentieth All-Ireland Final and the deciding match of the 1951 All-Ireland Senior Camogie Championship, an inter-county camogie tournament for the top teams in Ireland.

Dublin rushed into a 4–3 to 0–1 lead within twelve minutes, and never looked worried. Sophie Brack was their top scorer with 4–2, while Eileen Burke scored two goals.
