= 1943 All-Ireland Senior Camogie Championship final =

1943 All-Ireland Senior Camogie Final
- Event: All-Ireland Senior Camogie Championship 1943
Dublin	Galway
8-0	1-1
- Date: 17 October 1943
- Venue: Croke Park, Dublin
- Referee: Vera Campbell (Tyrone)
- Attendance: 9,136

The 1943 All-Ireland Senior Camogie Championship Final was the twelfth All-Ireland Final and the deciding match of the 1943 All-Ireland Senior Camogie Championship, an inter-county camogie tournament for the top teams in Ireland.

Dublin dominated the game and won with 8 goals, including three by Doreen Rogers and two by E. Mulcahy.
