= 1950 All-Ireland Senior Camogie Championship =

Camogie championship

All-Ireland Senior Camogie Championship 1950
Winners
- Champions: Dublin (10th title)
- Captain: Pat Raftery

Runners-up
- Runners-up: Antrim & London
- Captain: Peg Dooey

The 1950 All-Ireland Senior Camogie Championship was the high point of the 1950 season in Camogie. The championship was won by Dublin who defeated London by a 21-point margin in the final, having already defeated Antrim by a ten-point margin in the home final.

== Structure ==
Galway defeated Roscommon by 7–7 to nil in the Connacht final. Kathleen Cody and Kathleen Mills dominated midfield and as Dublin beat Galway 9–7 to 2–1 at Parnell Park while goals from Madge Rainey, Sarah O'Neill and Mary Rua McGarry gave Antrim victory over Munster champions Tipperary at Corrigan Park

== Home Final ==
Sophie Brack’s goal for Dublin in the first minute of the final was disallowed. Goals from Madge Rainey and Mary McKeever helped Antrim take a 2-0 to 0-3 lead before Brack scored just before half time from close range. It was level at half time Dublin 2-3 to Antrim 2-0. Antrim levelled again with a Madge Rainey goal with 15 minutes to go before Dublin pulled away with four goals, one each from Sophie Brack and Patsy Cooney, 1-1 from Kathleen Cody and another Sophie Brack goal. It was played, according to the Irish Independent“at a fast and exciting tempo”:

Dublin captured the title for the eleventh time by outstaying a rejuvenated Antrim side in the last quarter of the match. Until that all important final quarter the Ulster girls matched the holders puck for puck, and score for score and showed spirit and gameness in fighting back time after time when Dublin seemed to be getting on top. For all their great-hearted efforts Antrim lacked the finesse, the high degree of polished stick work and positional skill displayed by the star-studded Dublin team. The Antrim forwards never attempted to emulate the delightful combined movements of the winners attack, but in and around the goalmouth they seized on the slightest slip by a defender. Mary Rua McGarry was particularly adept at these tactics.

The Irish Press noted:

None of those who saw the match would agree there were ten points in the difference. It was a game which surpassed all expectations. This was not only a complete vindication of the wisdom of staging an All Ireland championship in this code, but was a most eloquent tribute to the tenacity and purposefulness of the enthusiasts in Antrim, who have kept the game going there. As a game it was a treat to watch and the whole sixty minutes sparkled with good play. Every girl on the field had her heart in her job and the appreciative cheers of the 3,000 people present were eloquent testimony to the very high level of play set up by this gallant 24.”

== Final Proper ==
Dublin then travelled to Belfast to play London in the “final proper” played alongside the Ward Cup match between Meath and Mayo before a large crowd. London were hampered in the loss of their captain Noreen Collins in the first ten minutes. Dublin led 4–2 to nil at half time, Patsy Cooney scoring three of their eight goals in an 8–2 to 1–2 victory,

=== Final stages ===
August 27
Semi-Final

| Dublin | 9-7 – 2-1 | Galway |

August 27
Semi-Final

| Antrim | 3-2 – 1-0 | Tiperary |

Corrigan Park

December 3
Final

| Dublin | 6-5 – 4-1 | Antrim |

Croke Park

| Dublin | Antrim |

DUBLIN:
| GK | 1 | Eileen Duffy (Celtic) |
| FB | 2 | Nan Mahon |
| RWB | 3 | Anna Young (Celtic) |
| CB | 4 | Sadie Hayes |
| LWB | 5 | Mona Walsh (Eoghan Rua) |
| MF | 6 | Nancy Caffrey (Eoghan Rua) |
| MF | 7 | Kathleen Cody (CIÉ) (0-4) |
| MF | 8 | Kathleen Mills (CIÉ) (0-1) |
| RWF | 9 | Patsy Cooney (2-0) |
| CF | 10 | Joan Cosgrave (1-0) |
| LWF | 11 | Pat Raftery (Col San Dominic) (Capt) |
| FF | 12 | Sophie Brack (CIÉ). (3-0) |

ANTRIM:
| GK | 1 | Betty McFaul |
| FB | 2 | Peg Dooey (Capt) |
| RWB | 3 | Moya Forde |
| CB | 4 | Kathleen Dooey |
| LWB | 5 | Geraldine Swindles |
| MF | 6 | Sue McMullan |
| MF | 7 | Mary McGarry |
| MF | 8 | Ethna Dougan |
| RWF | 9 | Sarah O'Neill |
| CF | 10 | Madge Rainey (2-0) |
| LWF | 11 | Mary McKeever (2-0) |
| FF | 12 | Mary Rua McGarry (0-1) |

MATCH RULES

- 50 minutes
- Replay if scores level
- Maximum of 3 substitutions

== See also ==
- All-Ireland Senior Hurling Championship
- Wikipedia List of Camogie players
- National Camogie League
- Camogie All Stars Awards
- Ashbourne Cup

| Preceded by All-Ireland Senior Camogie Championship 1949 | All-Ireland Senior Camogie Championship; 1932 – present | Succeeded by All-Ireland Senior Camogie Championship 1951 |
