= 1949 All-Ireland Senior Camogie Championship final =

Camogie championship match

1949 All-Ireland Senior Camogie Final
- Event: All-Ireland Senior Camogie Championship 1949
Dublin	Tipperary
8-7	4-2
- Date: 30 October 1949
- Venue: St. Cronan's Park, Roscrea
- Referee: Celia Mulholland (Galway)
- Attendance: 1,200

The 1949 All-Ireland Senior Camogie Championship Final was the eighteenth All-Ireland Final and the deciding match of the 1949 All-Ireland Senior Camogie Championship, an inter-county camogie tournament for the top teams in Ireland.

Dublin led 7–4 to 1–1 at half-time, and although Tipperary made a slight comeback, Dublin still won easily. Kathleen Cody scored 6-7 of Dublin's total.
