= 1937 All-Ireland Senior Camogie Championship =

Camogie championship

All-Ireland Senior Camogie Championship 1937
Tournament details
- Date: 23 May – 17 December

Winners
- Champions: Dublin (3rd title)
- Captain: Mary Walsh

Runners-up
- Runners-up: Galway
- Captain: Peg Morris

The 1937 All-Ireland Senior Camogie Championship was the high point of the 1937 season in Camogie. The championship was won by Dublin, who defeated Galway by a 25-point margin in the final on front of what the Irish Independent reported was one of the biggest crowds ever at a camogie match.

== Structure ==
Dublin beat Louth 5–0 to 1–3 in the Leinster semi-final and Meath 6–3 to 1–1 in the final. Antrim beat surprise finalists Monaghan 4–2 to 0–2 in the Ulster final. Galway beat Sligo by 4–0 to 1–2 in the sparsely attended Connacht final in Castlerea. Galway led Antrim by 2–0 to 1–2 at half time in the semi–final, then Antrim's Winnifred Storey equalised with ten minutes to go. As the Irish Press reported:

Unfortunately for Antrim the excitement seemed to spread to some of their players. They spoiled chances through over eagerness and their marking was not so keen. Galway took their chance and two quick goals from Celia Mulholland and Mary Joyce settled the issue, although Winnie Storey got another goal for Antrim just before the end. Thanks to their livelier forwards and their cleaner and more accurate striking Galway qualified for the All Ireland camóguidheacht final.

== Final ==
Jean Hannon and Angela Egan had Dublin two goals up within three minutes of the start of the final. Eveleen O'Beirne pulled a goal back for Galway but they never recovered. The Connacht Sentinel reported that Galway "were best served by Jo Melvin in the goal who drew frequent rounds of applause for her saves".

=== Final stages ===
15 August
Semi-Final

Dublin	3–2 – 2–1	Cork

Croke Park

10 October
Semi-Final

Galway	5–0 – 3–3	Antrim

Killester

17 December
Final

Dublin	9–4 – 1–0	Galway

Croke Park

Dublin	Galway

Dublin:
GK	1	Mary Lahiffe (UCD)
FB	2	Mary Walsh (UCD) (Capt)
RWB	3	Patty Kenny (Col San Dominic)
CB	4	Peggy Griffin (Col San Dominic)
LWB	5	Rose Fletcher (Scoil Bríghde)
MF	6	Sheila Hodgins (Optimists)
MF	7	Emmy Delaney (UCD)
MF	8	Angela Egan (Col San Dominic) (1–0)
RWF	9	Eva Moran (Col San Dominic) (2–0)
CF	10	Nuala Sheehan (UCD) (0–2)
LWF	11	Doreen Rogers (Austin Stacks) (2–0)
FF	12	Jean Hannon (Crokes) (4–0).

Galway:
GK	1	Josie Melvin (Galway City)
FB	2	Monica Duggan (Galway City)
RWB	3	Peg Morris (Headford) (Capt)
CB	4	Frances Coen (Galway City)
LWB	5	Nora Conroy (Galway City)
MF	6	Kathleen Cosgrave (Galway City)
MF	7	Mary Lyons (Galway City)
MF	8	Nora O'Connell (Galway City)
RWF	9	Mary Joyce (Galway City)
CF	10	Nora Kavanagh (Galway City)
LWF	11	Celia Mulholland (Galway City)
FF	12	Eveleen O'Beirne (UCG) (1–0).

Match Rules

- 50 minutes
- Replay if scores level
- Maximum of 3 substitutions

== See also ==
- All-Ireland Senior Hurling Championship
- Wikipedia List of Camogie players
- National Camogie League
- Camogie All Stars Awards
- Ashbourne Cup

Preceded by 1936 All-Ireland Senior Camogie Championship	All-Ireland Senior Camogie Championship; 1932–present	Succeeded by 1938 All-Ireland Senior Camogie Championship
