= 1948 All-Ireland Senior Camogie Championship final =

1948 All-Ireland Senior Camogie Final
- Event: All-Ireland Senior Camogie Championship 1948
Dublin	Down
11-4	4-2
- Date: 29 September 1946
- Venue: Croke Park, Dublin
- Referee: James Byrne (Waterford)
- Attendance: 1,500

The 1948 All-Ireland Senior Camogie Championship Final was the seventeenth All-Ireland Final and the deciding match of the 1948 All-Ireland Senior Camogie Championship, an inter-county camogie tournament for the top teams in Ireland.

The final, unusually, was played on a Saturday. An inexperienced Down side, playing their first final, lost by twenty-three points. Dublin's Kathleen Cody, Sophie Brack and J. Cosgrave all scored hat-tricks.
