= 1994 All-Ireland Senior Camogie Championship final =

1994 All-Ireland Senior Camogie Final
- Event: All-Ireland Senior Camogie Championship 1994
Kilkenny	Wexford
2-11	0-8
- Date: 25 September 1994
- Venue: Croke Park, Dublin
- Referee: Maria Pollard (Waterford)
- Attendance: 5,000

The 1994 All-Ireland Senior Camogie Championship Final, the 63rd event of its type, is the culmination of the 1994 All-Ireland Senior Camogie Championship.

Kilkenny won a twelfth All-Ireland title, captain Angela Downey scoring 2-3.
