= 1952 All-Ireland Senior Camogie Championship final =

1952 All-Ireland Senior Camogie Final
- Event: All-Ireland Senior Camogie Championship 1952
Dublin	Antrim
5-1	4-2
- Date: 3 August 1952
- Venue: Croke Park, Dublin
- Referee: Celia Mulholland (Galway)
- Attendance: 4,000

The 1952 All-Ireland Senior Camogie Championship Final was the 21st All-Ireland Final and the deciding match of the 1952 All-Ireland Senior Camogie Championship, an inter-county camogie tournament for the top teams in Ireland.

Dublin won an exciting final by two points.
