= 2022 All-Ireland Senior Camogie Championship final =

Gaelic sports match

2022 All-Ireland Senior Camogie Championship Final
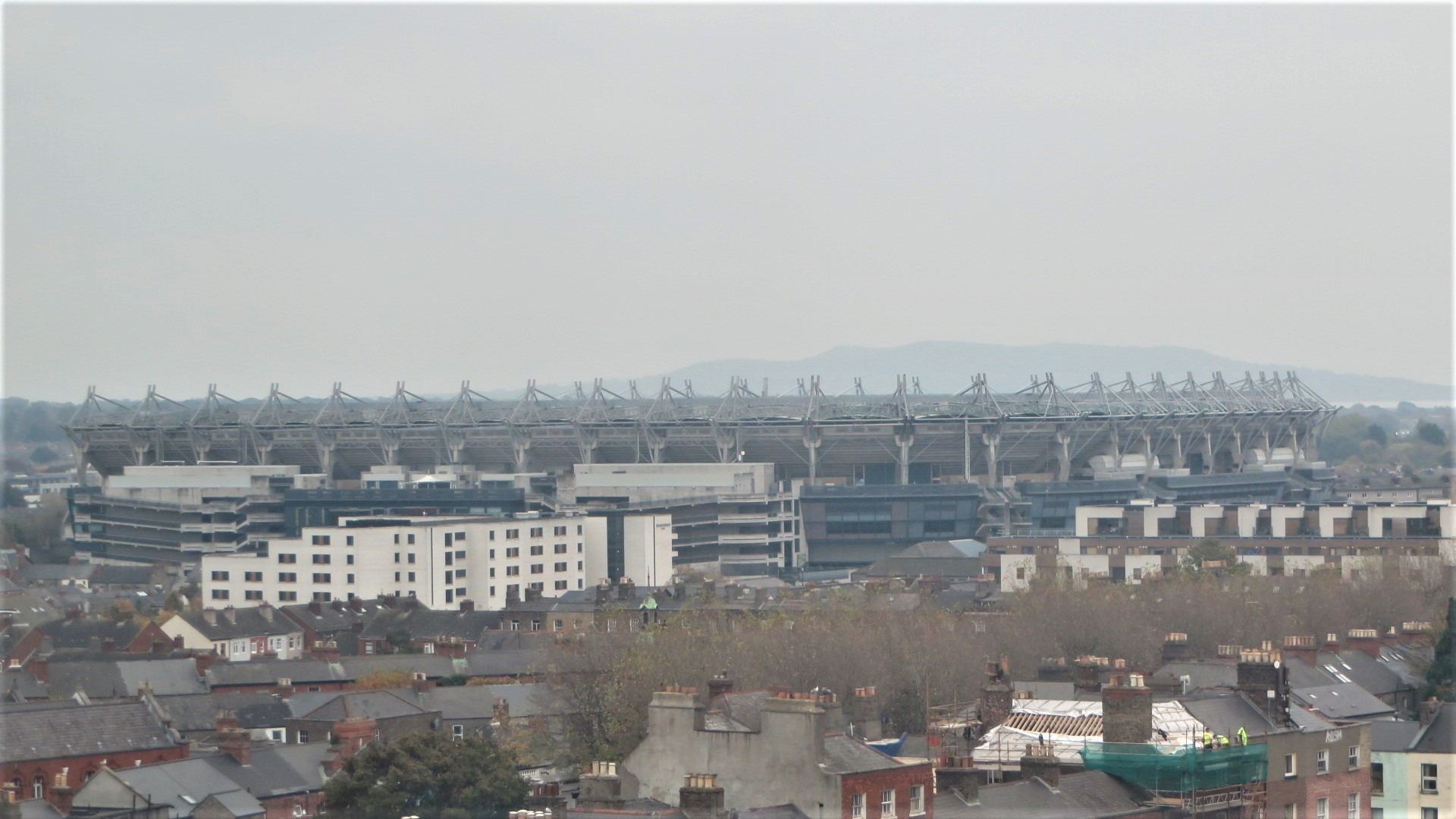
- Event: 2022 All-Ireland Senior Camogie Championship
Cork	Kilkenny
1-12	1-13
- Date: August 7, 2022
- Venue: Croke Park, Dublin
- Player of the Match: Katie Nolan
- Referee: Ray Kelly
- Weather: Dry and sunny spells

The 2022 All-Ireland Senior Camogie Championship Final, the 91st event of its kind and the culmination of the 2022 All-Ireland Senior Camogie Championship, was played at Croke Park on 7 August 2022. The finals of the 2022 All-Ireland Intermediate Camogie Championship and All-Ireland Junior Camogie Championship took place earlier that day at Croke Park.

Kilkenny defeated Cork in the final to win their 15th title. Denise Gaule landed the winning point from a free in injury time.

== Details ==
RTÉ2

August 7, 2022
16:15 IST (UTC+01:00)
Final

Report

Cork	1-12 (15) – (16) 1-13	Kilkenny
(HT: 1-04 - 0-07)
Gls: F Keating; Pts: A O'Connor 5 (5f), K Mackey 3, F Keating 2, H Looney 1, S McCarthy 1		Gls: S Dwyer; Pts: K Nolan 5 (3f), D Gaule 3 (1f), M Walsh 3, M Kenneally 1, T Fitzgerald 1

Croke Park, Dublin
Referee: Ray Kelly
Attendance: 23,426
