= 1956 All-Ireland Senior Camogie Championship final =

1956 All-Ireland Senior Camogie Final
- Event: All-Ireland Senior Camogie Championship 1956
Antrim	Cork
5-3	4-2
- Date: 30 September 1956
- Venue: Croke Park, Dublin
- Referee: Kathleen O'Duffy (Dublin)
- Attendance: 4,100

The 1956 All-Ireland Senior Camogie Championship Final was the 25th All-Ireland Final and the deciding match of the 1956 All-Ireland Senior Camogie Championship, an inter-county camogie tournament for the top teams in Ireland.

Antrim had ended Dublin's eight-year win streak and so were favourites to take the All-Ireland title. They led 4-3 to 4-2 near the end when Antrim's goalkeeper, Teresa Kearns, made a save. The Glenswomen then rushed down the field to score a fifth goal and secure victory.
