= 1959 All-Ireland Senior Camogie Championship final =

1959 All-Ireland Senior Camogie Final
- Event: All-Ireland Senior Camogie Championship 1959
Dublin	Mayo
11-6	1-3
- Date: 13 September 1959
- Venue: Croke Park, Dublin
- Referee: Nancy Murray (Antrim)
- Attendance: 4,000

The 1959 All-Ireland Senior Camogie Championship Final was the 28th All-Ireland Final and the deciding match of the 1959 All-Ireland Senior Camogie Championship, an inter-county camogie tournament for the top teams in Ireland.

Mayo, playing in their first (and, as of 2011, only) All-Ireland final, were well off the pace, and only managed one point in the first half. Dublin won by thirty-three points, still the record for an All-Ireland camogie final.
