= 1943 All-Ireland Senior Camogie Championship =

Camogie championship

All-Ireland Senior Camogie Championship 1943
Tournament details
- Date: June 16 – October 17

Winners
- Champions: Dublin (6th title)
- Captain: Peggy Griffin

Runners-up
- Runners-up: Cork
- Captain: Kathleen Coughlan

Other
- Matches played: 2

The 1943 All-Ireland Senior Camogie Championship was the high point of the 1943 season in Camogie. The championship was won by Dublin, who defeated Cork by a 20-point margin in the final. The match was played at Croke Park, Dublin.

== Final ==
Dublin goalkeeper Peggy Hogg was forced to withdraw through illness on the morning of the match.

== Aftermath ==
Elizabeth Mulcahy, who scored the opening goal for Dublin, was to become one of Ireland's foremost fashion designers.

=== Final stages ===
Semi-Final

Dublin	1–4 – 0–0	Antrim

MacRory Park

Semi-Final

Cork	6–7 – 1–0	Galway

The Mardyke

October 17
Final

Dublin	8–0 – 1–1	Cork

Killester, Dublin

Dublin	Cork

Dublin:
GK	1	Maura O'Carroll (Scoil Bríghde)
FB	2	Rose Martin (Austin Stacks)
RWB	3	Patty Kenny (Col San Dominic)
CB	4	Peggy Griffin (Col San Dominic) (Capt)
LWB	5	Kathleen Kearns (Optimists)
MF	6	Josie Kelly (UCD)
MF	7	Kathleen Cody (GSR)
MF	8	Kathleen Mills (GSR) (1–0)
RWF	9	Īde O'Kiely (UCD) (2–0)
CF	10	Elizabeth Mulcahy (UCD) (1–0)
LWF	11	Doreen Rogers (Austin Stacks) (3–0)
FF	12	Maura Moore (Optimists) (1–0)

Cork:
GK	1	Eily Lyons
FB	2	Mary O'Leary
RWB	3	Maureen Cashman
CB	4	Mary Fitzgerald
LWB	5	Maureen Hegarty
MF	6	Kitty Buckley
MF	7	Kathleen Coughlan (Capt)
MF	8	Mona Hobbs
RWF	9	Kathleen Barry
CF	10	Patty Hegarty (0–1)
LWF	11	Eileen Casey (1–0)
FF	12	Sheila Kelleher

Match Rules

- 50 minutes
- Replay if scores level
- Maximum of 3 substitutions

== See also ==
- All-Ireland Senior Hurling Championship
- Wikipedia List of Camogie players
- National Camogie League
- Camogie All Stars Awards
- Ashbourne Cup

Preceded by 1942 All-Ireland Senior Camogie Championship	All-Ireland Senior Camogie Championship; 1932–present	Succeeded by 1944 All-Ireland Senior Camogie Championship
