= 1954 All-Ireland Senior Camogie Championship final =

1954 All-Ireland Senior Camogie Final
- Event: All-Ireland Senior Camogie Championship 1954
Dublin	Derry
10-4	4-2
- Date: 22 August 1954
- Venue: Croke Park, Dublin
- Referee: Noreen Murphy (Cork)
- Attendance: 2,000

The 1954 All-Ireland Senior Camogie Championship Final was the 23rd All-Ireland Final and the deciding match of the 1954 All-Ireland Senior Camogie Championship, an inter-county camogie tournament for the top teams in Ireland.

Dublin completely dominated the game: they led 6-2 to 0-1 at the break, the Derry side having only entered their opponent's half with the sliotar three times. Dublin eased off in the second half and won an eighth All-Ireland in a row.
