= 1944 All-Ireland Senior Camogie Championship final =

1944 All-Ireland Senior Camogie Final
- Event: All-Ireland Senior Camogie Championship 1944
Dublin	Antrim
5-4	0-0
- Date: 5 November 1944
- Venue: Corrigan Park, Belfast
- Referee: Seán Gleeson (Tipperary)
- Attendance: 2,600

The 1944 All-Ireland Senior Camogie Championship Final was the thirteenth All-Ireland Final and the deciding match of the 1944 All-Ireland Senior Camogie Championship, an inter-county camogie tournament for the top teams in Ireland.

Antrim were the first Ulster team to reach the final, but disappointed on the day, failing to score as Dublin finished a three-in-a-row.
