= 1953 All-Ireland Senior Camogie Championship final =

1953 All-Ireland Senior Camogie Final
- Event: All-Ireland Senior Camogie Championship 1953
Dublin	Tipperary
8-4	1-3
- Date: 2 August 1953
- Venue: Croke Park, Dublin
- Referee: Lily Spence (Antrim)
- Attendance: 4,000

The 1953 All-Ireland Senior Camogie Championship Final was the 22nd All-Ireland Final and the deciding match of the 1953 All-Ireland Senior Camogie Championship, an inter-county camogie tournament for the top teams in Ireland.

A fifteen-year-old Úna O'Connor scored three goals as Dublin won easily.
