= 1970 All-Ireland Senior Camogie Championship final =

1970 All-Ireland Senior Camogie Final
- Event: All-Ireland Senior Camogie Championship 1970
Cork	Kilkenny
5-7	3-2
- Date: 20 September 1970
- Venue: Croke Park, Dublin
- Referee: Nancy Murray (Antrim)
- Attendance: 4,000

The 1970 All-Ireland Senior Camogie Championship Final was the 39th All-Ireland Final and the deciding match of the 1970 All-Ireland Senior Camogie Championship, an inter-county camogie tournament for the top teams in Ireland.

The final was marred by persistent fouls. Cork led by seven points at half-time and won by 11 in end, a young Liz Garvan scoring 3-6.
