= 1947 All-Ireland Senior Camogie Championship final =

1947 All-Ireland Senior Camogie Final
- Event: All-Ireland Senior Camogie Championship 1947
Antrim	Dublin
2-4	2-1
- Date: 9 November 1947
- Venue: Corrigan Park, Belfast
- Referee: C. Mulholland (Galway)
- Attendance: 5,000

The 1947 All-Ireland Senior Camogie Championship Final was the sixteenth All-Ireland Final and the deciding match of the 1947 All-Ireland Senior Camogie Championship, an inter-county camogie tournament for the top teams in Ireland.

Antrim led by 2-2 to 2-0 at half-time and had a three-point lead in the last minute when Kathleen Cody sent in a shot at goal that would have equalised the game. The Antrim 'keeper dug the ball out of a mucky goalmouth and the referee and umpires judged that the sliotar did not cross the line, which was enough to give Antrim their three-in-a-row.
