= 1933 All-Ireland Senior Camogie Championship =

Camogie championship

All-Ireland Senior Camogie Championship 1933
Championship details
- Dates: 2 July – 17 December 1933

All-Ireland champions
- Winners: Dublin (2nd win)
- Captain: Máire Gill

All-Ireland runners-up
- Runners-up: Galway
- Captain: Peg Morris

The 1933 All-Ireland Senior Camogie Championship was the high point of the 1933 season in Camogie. The championship was won by Dublin, who defeated Galway by a 17-point margin in the final. The match was played at Killester.

== Structure ==
The championship was entered by 16 counties, up from 10 in 1932. Kildare qualified for the semi-final for the only time in their history, but found themselves 3–0 to nil down at half time and scoring a late goal through Polly Smith of Newbridge St Theresa's. The decision to name the inter-county cup the O'Duffy Cup after Sean O'Duffy was made at a Central Council meeting on 19 August 1933.

== Final ==
Dillon Bowden scored the first point in the final as Ita McNeill and Jean Hannon shared seven goals between them in the Dublin attack. The Dublin midfield trio of Mollie Gill, Máire O'Kelly and Emmy Delaney dictated the final. Galway stayed in the match until half-time but were swept away in the second period. Monica Duggan, sister of hurling star, Jimmy Duggan played for Galway in the final.

== Championship Results ==
=== First round ===
2 July

Tipperary	5–0 – 0–1	Limerick

Tipperary Sportsfield

Kildare	2–3 – 1–2	Carlow

10 September

Meath	3–1 – 1–0	Laois

Portarlington

10 September

Kilkenny	3–1 – 3–0	Waterford

Walsh Park

31 September

Tipperary	3–1 – 0–1	Kilkenny

Kilkenny

15 October

Dublin	3–0 – 2–1	Tipperary

Kilkenny

4 September

Louth	7–2 – 2–0	Tipperary

Kilkenny

Dublin	11–2 – 1–0	Meath

Phoenix Park

=== Final stages ===
August
Semi-Final

Dublin	9–1 – 5–3	Louth

17 September
Semi-Final

Galway	3–2 – 1–0	Kildare

Roscrea

17 December
Final

Dublin	9–2 – 4–0	Galway

Killester, Dublin

Dublin	Galway

Dublin:
GK	1	Bríd Kenny Dominican College Past
FB	2	Mary Walsh (UCD)
RWB	3	Queenie Dunne (Bray United)
CB	4	Kathleen Mayne (UCD)
LWB	5	Essie Forde (Civil Service)
MF	6	Máire Gill (Crokes) (Capt)
MF	7	Emmy Delaney (UCD)
MF	8	Máire O'Kelly (UCD)
RWF	9	Dillon Bowden (Bray United) (1–1)
CF	10	Maura McGuinness (Civil Service) (1–0)
LWF	11	Ita McNeill (UCD) (4–0)
FF	12	Jean Hannon (Bray United) (3–1)

Galway:
GK	1	Bridie Murray (Technical Institute)
FB	2	Martha O'Connor (Tuam)
RWB	3	Peg Lahiffe (Kilbeacanty)
CB	4	Nora Conroy (Technical Institute)
LWB	5	Monica Duggan (Technical Institute)
MF	6	Una O'Riordan (UCG)
MF	7	Peg Morris (Headford) (Capt)
MF	8	Dell Kearney (Currandrum)
RWF	9	Bríd O'Beirne (UCG) (2–0)
CF	10	Kathleen Maguire (UCG) (2–0)
LWF	11	Kathleen Walsh (Tuam)
FF	12	Maureen Lawless (UCG)

Match Rules

- 40 minutes
- Replay if scores level
- No substitutions except in case of injury

== See also ==
- All-Ireland Senior Hurling Championship
- Wikipedia List of Camogie players
- National Camogie League
- Camogie All Stars Awards
- Ashbourne Cup

Preceded by 1932 All-Ireland Senior Camogie Championship	All-Ireland Senior Camogie Championship; 1932–present	Succeeded by 1934 All-Ireland Senior Camogie Championship
