= 1938 All-Ireland Senior Camogie Championship =

Camogie championship

All-Ireland Senior Camogie Championship 1938
Tournament details
- Date: 24 April – 30 October

Winners
- Champions: Dublin (4th title)
- Captain: Emmy Delaney

Runners-up
- Runners-up: Cork (4th title)
- Captain: Kathleen Coughlan

The 1938 All-Ireland Senior Camogie Championship was the high point of the 1938 season in Camogie. The championship was won by Dublin, who defeated Cork by a six-point margin in the final.

== Structure ==
Cork beat Waterford by 6–3 to nil in the Munster final. Antrim beat Cavan by 3–2 to 2–0 in the Ulster final. Eva Moran scored 2–1 as Dublin beat Antrim by three points in the semi-final in Belfast on a day that GAA President, Paddy McNamee, threw in the ball.

== Final ==
Two late goals by Doreen Rogers gave Dublin victory over Cork in the All-Ireland Final on a heavy pitch at the Cork Athletic Grounds. The match was level with five minutes remaining.

=== Final stages ===
2 October
Semi-Final

Cork	5–1 – 0–1	Galway

The Sportsground

18 September
Semi-Final

Dublin	3–1 – 2–1	Antrim

McRory Park

30 November
Final

Dublin	5–0 – 2–3	Cork

Cork Athletic Grounds

Dublin	Cork

Dublin:
GK	1	Mary Lahiffe (UCD)
FB	2	Rose Martin (Austin Stacks)
RWB	3	Patty Kenny (Col San Dominic)
CB	4	Peggy Griffin (Col San Dominic)
LWB	5	May Fletcher (Scoil Bríghde)
MF	6	Sheila Hodgins (Optimists)
MF	7	Emmy Delaney (UCD) (Capt) (1–0)
MF	8	Angela Egan (Col San Dominic)
RWF	9	Agnes Hourigan (UCD)
CF	10	Nuala Sheehan (UCD) (1–0)
LWF	11	Doreen Rogers (Austin Stacks) (2–0)
FF	12	Ita McNeill (UCD) (1–0).

Cork:
GK	1	Eileen Lyons
FB	2	Kathleen Coughlan (Capt)
RWB	3	Bríd Cronin
CB	4	Nan O'Dowd
LWB	5	Essie Staunton
MF	6	Lil Kirby (0–3)
MF	7	Maura Cronin
MF	8	Chrissie Cashman
RWF	9	Josie McGrath
CF	10	Kitty Buckley (1–0)
LWF	11	Renee Fitzgerald (1–0)
FF	12	Betty Riordan

Match Rules

- 50 minutes
- Replay if scores level
- Maximum of 3 substitutions

== See also ==
- All-Ireland Senior Hurling Championship
- Wikipedia List of Camogie players
- National Camogie League
- Camogie All Stars Awards
- Ashbourne Cup

Preceded by 1937 All-Ireland Senior Camogie Championship	All-Ireland Senior Camogie Championship; 1932–present	Succeeded by 1939 All-Ireland Senior Camogie Championship
