= 1937 All-Ireland Senior Camogie Championship final =

1937 All-Ireland Senior Camogie Final
- Event: All-Ireland Senior Camogie Championship 1937
| Dublin | Galway |
| 9-4 | 1-0 |
- Date: 28 November 1937
- Venue: Croke Park, Dublin
- Referee: Lil Kirby (Cork)
- Attendance: 5,000

The 1937 All-Ireland Senior Camogie Championship Final was the sixth All-Ireland Final and the deciding match of the 1937 All-Ireland Senior Camogie Championship, an inter-county camogie tournament for the top teams in Ireland.

Dublin won by a wide margin, having led 6–2 to 1–0 at half-time.
