= 1944 All-Ireland Senior Camogie Championship =

Camogie championship

All-Ireland Senior Camogie Championship 1944
Winners
- Champions: Dublin (7th title)
- Captain: Doreen Rogers

Runners-up
- Runners-up: Antrim
- Captain: Marcella Quinn

Other
- Matches played: 2

The 1944 All-Ireland Senior Camogie Championship was the high point of the 1944 season in Camogie. The championship was won by Dublin, who defeated Antrim by a 17-point margin in the final. Gate receipts were £211.

== Structure ==
The altercation with Dublin over the ban on hockey players re-emerged in 1943 and was compounded by another with Cork over male officials and they withdrew from the Camogie Association. In the absence of Cork, Clare defeated Waterford 3–1 to 3–0 in the Munster final to win their first Munster championship. They failed to score against Dublin in the semi-final while a late goal from Bridie O'Neill gave Antrim a semi-final victory over Galway.

== Final ==
The weekend before the final Dublin travelled to Cork, who had not participated in the championship, and were defeated 3–0 to 1–3. This raised questions about the validity of the championship, as well as Dublin's legality for having played an unaffiliated team. Bishop of Down and Connor, Daniel Mageean threw in the ball between Dublin and Antrim in final.

=== Final stages ===
Semi-Final

Dublin	8–7 – 0–0	Clare

Inchicore

Semi-Final

Antrim	3–2 – 2–2	Galway

Galway Sportsgrounds

17 December
Final

Dublin	5–4 –0–0	Antrim

Corrigan Park

Dublin	Antrim

Dublin:
GK	1	Bríd Kenny (Col San Dominic)
FB	2	Rose Martin (Austin Stacks)
RWB	3	Patty Kenny (Col San Dominic)
CB	4	Rose Fletcher (Scoil Bríghde)
LWB	5	Sheila McMahon (Austin Stacks)
MF	6	Carmel Keogh (GSR)
MF	7	Kathleen Cody (GSR) (2–2)
MF	8	Kathleen Mills (GSR)
RWF	9	Īde O'Kiely (UCD) (1–0)
CF	10	Elizabeth Mulcahy (UCD) (0–2)
LWF	11	Doreen Rogers (Austin Stacks) (2–0)
FF	12	Maura Moore (Optimists)

Antrim:
GK	1	Patsy Smith
FB	2	Marcella Quinn
RWB	3	Betty Stafford
CB	4	Moya Branigan
LWB	5	Bridie Murray
MF	6	Marie O'Gorman
MF	7	Claire McDermott
MF	8	Winnie Storey
RWF	9	Bridie O'Neill
CF	10	Mavis Madden
LWF	11	Claire Marshall
FF	12	Sue McKeown

Match Rules

- 50 minutes
- Replay if scores level
- Maximum of 3 substitutions

== See also ==
- All-Ireland Senior Hurling Championship
- Wikipedia List of Camogie players
- National Camogie League
- Camogie All Stars Awards
- Ashbourne Cup

Preceded by 1943 All-Ireland Senior Camogie Championship	All-Ireland Senior Camogie Championship; 1932–present	Succeeded by 1945 All-Ireland Senior Camogie Championship
