= 1942 All-Ireland Senior Camogie Championship final =

1942 All-Ireland Senior Camogie Final
- Event: All-Ireland Senior Camogie Championship 1942
Dublin	Cork
1-2	1-2
- Date: 25 October 1942
- Venue: University College Cork, Cork
- Referee: Seán Gleeson (Tipperary)
- Attendance: 4,000

1942 All-Ireland Senior Camogie Final Replay
Dublin	Cork
4-1	2-2
- Date: 15 November 1942
- Venue: Croke Park, Dublin
- Referee: Seán Gleeson (Tipperary)
- Attendance: 6,100

The 1942 All-Ireland Senior Camogie Championship Final was the eleventh All-Ireland Final and the deciding match of the 1942 All-Ireland Senior Camogie Championship, an inter-county camogie tournament for the top teams in Ireland.

Dublin were the better team in the first half, but only led by a point to no score at the break. In the second half, Doreen Rogers scored a goal for Dublin, but Renee Fitzgerald replied with a Cork goal and had another disallowed near the end. The game was drawn.

The replay was played in Croke Park three weeks later, and Dublin led 2–1 to 0–0 at the break, including a controversial Doreen Rogers goal that was argued to have been scored from inside the small rectangle. Dublin maintained their advantage to the end and prevented a Cork four-in-a-row.
