= 1964 All-Ireland Senior Camogie Championship final =

1964 All-Ireland Senior Camogie Final
- Event: All-Ireland Senior Camogie Championship 1964
Dublin	Antrim
7-4	3-1
- Date: 4 October 1964
- Venue: Croke Park, Dublin
- Referee: Vera McDonnell (Mayo)
- Attendance: 3,500

The 1964 All-Ireland Senior Camogie Championship Final was the 33rd All-Ireland Final and the deciding match of the 1964 All-Ireland Senior Camogie Championship, an inter-county camogie tournament for the top teams in Ireland.

Dublin rushed into a 6-0 to 0-1 lead, and won with ease. Judy Doyle scored 4-1.
