= 1933 All-Ireland Senior Camogie Championship final =

1933 All-Ireland Senior Camogie Final
- Event: All-Ireland Senior Camogie Championship 1933
Dublin	Galway
9-2	4-0
- Date: 17 December 1933
- Venue: Parnell Park, Killester
- Referee: Julian McDonnell (Meath)
- Attendance: 1,000

The 1933 All-Ireland Senior Camogie Championship Final was the 2nd All-Ireland Final and the deciding match of the 1933 All-Ireland Senior Camogie Championship, an inter-county camogie tournament for the top teams in Ireland.

Dublin won their second All-Ireland in a row, captained by Máire Gill.
