= 1938 All-Ireland Senior Camogie Championship final =

1938 All-Ireland Senior Camogie Final
- Event: All-Ireland Senior Camogie Championship 1938
Dublin	Cork
5-0	2-3
- Date: 30 October 1938
- Venue: Cork Athletic Grounds, Cork
- Referee: Peg Morris (Galway)
- Attendance: 2,000

The 1938 All-Ireland Senior Camogie Championship Final was the seventh All-Ireland Final and the deciding match of the 1938 All-Ireland Senior Camogie Championship, an inter-county camogie tournament for the top teams in Ireland.

The poor state of the field militated against a fast game. Dublin won by six points.
