= 1952 All-Ireland Senior Camogie Championship =

Camogie championship

All-Ireland Senior Camogie Championship 1952
Winners
- Champions: Dublin (12th title)
- Captain: Sophie Brack

Runners-up
- Runners-up: Antrim
- Captain: Madge Rainey

The 1952 All-Ireland Senior Camogie Championship was the high point of the 1952 season in Camogie. The championship was won by Dublin who defeated Antrim by a two-point margin in the final. The match was played at Croke Park

== Cork's return ==
Galway defeated Mayo by 3–2 to 3–0 in the Connacht final, and lost the semi-final against Dublin 9–5 to 0–1. Cork returned after their eight-year absence from the championship and duly won the Munster title. Antrim defeated Cork 3–2 to 1–6 in a semi-final that drew 3,000 followers to Casement Park. Antrim then defeated London by 5-1 to 1-0 to reach the final.

== Final ==
Sophie Brack scored three goals as Dublin defeated Antrim in the final, including Dublin’s winning goal in the last minute for a two-point victory. Kathleen Cody had retired and was replaced by UCD student, Annette Corrigan. The Celtic Club supplied the entire Dublin defence.

=== Final stages ===
July 20
Semi-Final

Antrim	3-2 – 1-6	Cork

Casement Park

July 27
Semi-Final

Dublin	9-5 – 0-1	Galway

Galway Sportsgrounds

August 10
Final

Dublin	5-1 – 4-2	Antrim

Croke Park

Dublin	Antrim

DUBLIN:
GK	1	Eileen Duffy (Celtic)
FB	2	Doretta Blackton (Celtic)
RWB	3	Carmel Walsh (CIÉ)
CB	4	Deborah Dunne (Austin Stacks)
LWB	5	Pauline Duffy (Celtic)
MF	6	Nancy Caffrey
MF	7	Annette Corrigan (UCD) (0-1)
MF	8	Kathleen Mills (CIÉ)
RWF	9	Eileen Bourke (UCD) (1-0)
CF	10	Nan Mahon (1-0)
LWF	11	Marie Price
FF	12	Sophie Brack (CIÉ) (3-0)

ANTRIM:
GK	1	Anne McGarry
FB	2	Moya Forde
RWB	3	Peg Dooey
CB	4	Mary McGarry
LWB	5	Deirdre O’Gorman
MF	6	Sue McMullan
MF	7	Ita O’Reilly
MF	8	Maeve Gilroy (0-2)
RWF	9	Sarah O’Neill
CF	10	Mary McKeever
LWF	11	Madge Rainey (2-0)
FF	12	Fionnuala Forde (1-0).

MATCH RULES

- 50 minutes
- Replay if scores level
- Maximum of 3 substitutions

== See also ==
- All-Ireland Senior Hurling Championship
- Wikipedia List of Camogie players
- National Camogie League
- Camogie All Stars Awards
- Ashbourne Cup

Preceded by All-Ireland Senior Camogie Championship 1951	All-Ireland Senior Camogie Championship; 1932 – present	Succeeded by All-Ireland Senior Camogie Championship 1953
