= 1950 All-Ireland Senior Camogie Championship final =

1950 All-Ireland Senior Camogie Final
- Event: All-Ireland Senior Camogie Championship 1950
Dublin	London
8-2	1-2
- Date: 26 March 1951
- City: Mitcham, London
- Attendance: 1,300

The 1950 All-Ireland Senior Camogie Championship Final was the nineteenth All-Ireland Final and the deciding match of the 1950 All-Ireland Senior Camogie Championship, an inter-county camogie tournament for the top teams in Ireland.

Dublin had beaten Antrim 6–5 to 4–1 in the "Home" final, and went to London for the All-Ireland final on Easter Monday 1951. They led 4–2 to 0–0 at half-time and won easily. P. Cooney scored three goals. This is the last All-Ireland final to date not to be held at Croke Park.
