= 1968 All-Ireland Senior Camogie Championship final =

1968 All-Ireland Senior Camogie Final
- Event: All-Ireland Senior Camogie Championship 1968
Wexford	Cork
4-2	2-5
- Date: 15 September 1968
- Venue: Croke Park, Dublin
- Referee: Nancy Murray (Antrim)
- Attendance: 4,500
- Weather: Hot and windy

The 1968 All-Ireland Senior Camogie Championship Final was the 37th All-Ireland Final and the deciding match of the 1968 All-Ireland Senior Camogie Championship, an inter-county camogie tournament for the top teams in Ireland.

Cork scored two early goals but Wexford let 3-1 to 2-0 at half-time. Both sides had the benefit of long puck-outs taken by their respective full-backs. Wexford won their first ever title by a three-point margin.
