= 1958 All-Ireland Senior Camogie Championship final =

1958 All-Ireland Senior Camogie Final
- Event: All-Ireland Senior Camogie Championship 1958
Dublin	Tipperary
5-4	1-1
- Date: 10 August 1958
- Venue: Croke Park, Dublin
- Referee: Nancy Murray (Antrim)
- Attendance: 53,357

The 1958 All-Ireland Senior Camogie Championship Final was the 27th All-Ireland Final and the deciding match of the 1958 All-Ireland Senior Camogie Championship, an inter-county camogie tournament for the top teams in Ireland.

The game was played after the Tipperary-Kilkenny hurling semi-final (hence the high attendance figure). Dublin had a comfortable victory.
