= 1988 All-Ireland Senior Camogie Championship final =

1988 All-Ireland Senior Camogie Final
- Event: All-Ireland Senior Camogie Championship 1988
Kilkenny	Cork
4-11	3-8
- Date: 25 September 1988
- Venue: Croke Park, Dublin
- Referee: Belle O'Loughlin (Down)
- Attendance: 4,000
- Weather: Windy

The 1988 All-Ireland Senior Camogie Championship Final, the 57th event of its type, is the culmination of the 1988 All-Ireland Senior Camogie Championship.

Despite the best efforts of Cork's, they trailed 3-3 to 1-5 at the half-time break and Kilkenny went on in the second half to win their fourth title in a row.
