= 2020 All-Ireland Senior Camogie Championship final =

Gaelic sports match

2020 All-Ireland Senior Camogie Championship Final
- Event: 2020 All-Ireland Senior Camogie Championship
Galway	Kilkenny
1–11	1–14
- Date: 12 December 2020
- Venue: Croke Park, Dublin
- Player of the Match: Aoife Doyle (Kilkenny)
- Referee: Owen Elliott (Antrim)
- Weather: 6 °C, cloudy

The 2020 All-Ireland Senior Camogie Championship Final, the 89th event of its kind and the culmination of the 2020 All-Ireland Senior Camogie Championship, was played at Croke Park in Dublin on 12 December 2020.

Kilkenny won their 14th title after defeating Galway by 1-14 to 1-11.

== Details ==
RTÉ 2
Sky Sports

12 December 2020
19:00 GMT
Final

Report

Galway	1-11 (14) – (17) 1-14	Kilkenny
(HT: 1-05 – 0-06)
Gls: O McGrath 1 Pts: C Dolan 6(5fs), S McGrath 2, A O’Reilly 1, N Kilkenny 1, A Donohue 1		Gls: D Gaule 1(pen); Pts: D Gaule 6(4fs, 1 '45'), A Doyle 4, A Dalton 1, M O’Connell 1, K Nolan 1, G Walsh 1

Croke Park, Dublin
Referee: Owen Elliott (Antrim)
Attendance: 0
