= 1967 All-Ireland Senior Camogie Championship final =

1967 All-Ireland Senior Camogie Final
- Event: All-Ireland Senior Camogie Championship 1967
Antrim	Dublin
4-2	4-2
- Date: 17 September 1967
- Venue: Croke Park, Dublin
- Attendance: 3,500
- Weather: Rain

1967 All-Ireland Senior Camogie Final Replay
Antrim	Dublin
3-9	4-2
- Date: 15 October 1967
- Venue: Croke Park, Dublin
- Attendance: 3,000

The 1967 All-Ireland Senior Camogie Championship Final was the 36th All-Ireland Final and the deciding match of the 1967 All-Ireland Senior Camogie Championship, an inter-county camogie tournament for the top teams in Ireland.

Dublin made a stronger start and let at half-time by a goal, but Antrim fought back for a draw. Mairéad McAtamney scored three goals for the Glenswomen.

In the replay, Antrim ended 10 years of Dublin dominance with a four-point win. This match marked the end of an era: having won 18 of the previous 19 titles, Dublin did not win again for 18 years.
