= 1934 All-Ireland Senior Camogie Championship final =

1934 All-Ireland Senior Camogie Final
- Event: All-Ireland Senior Camogie Championship 1934
Cork	Louth
4-3	1-4
- Date: 28 October 1934
- Venue: Croke Park, Dublin
- Referee: Tommie Ryan (Tipperary)
- Attendance: 3,500

The 1934 All-Ireland Senior Camogie Championship Final was the 3rd All-Ireland Final and the deciding match of the 1934 All-Ireland Senior Camogie Championship, an inter-county camogie tournament for the top teams in Ireland.

M. O'Shea scored a goal and Cork led 1–2 to 0–0 at half-time, and they won easily in the end.
