= 2003 All-Ireland Senior Camogie Championship final =

2003 All-Ireland Senior Camogie Final
- Event: All-Ireland Senior Camogie Championship 2003
Tipperary	Cork
2-11	1-11
- Date: 21 September 2003
- Venue: Croke Park, Dublin
- Man of the Match: Emer McDonnell (Cork)
- Referee: Sandy Stiven (Dublin)
- Attendance: 16,183

The 2003 All-Ireland Senior Camogie Championship Final, the 72nd event of its type, is the culmination of the 2003 All-Ireland Senior Camogie Championship.

Cork led Tipp 0-7 to 1-3 at half-time but Tipp rallied to win by a goal to regain the O'Duffy Cup and avenge the previous year's defeat.
