= 1953 All-Ireland Senior Camogie Championship =

Camogie championship

All-Ireland Senior Camogie Championship 1953
Winners
- Champions: Dublin (13th title)
- Captain: Sophie Brack

Runners-up
- Runners-up: Tipperary
- Captain: Mary Ann O'Brien

The 1953 All-Ireland Senior Camogie Championship was the high point of the 1953 season in Camogie. The championship was won by Dublin who defeated Tipperary by a 22-point margin in the final.

== Structure ==
London could not travel to the All Ireland semi-final against Tipperary in Roscrea. No Connacht county entered the championship.

== Final ==
Kathleen Mills had one of her best games, the Nenagh Guardian reported. Her long left handed drives brought about many of Dublin's goals. Dublin hit Tipperary with two goals in the first three minutes, led 5-2 to 0-3 at half time, and scored three more goals early in the second half. Katleen Griffin's goal for Tipperary midway through the second half drew a loud cheer from what was described as a "fair sized attendance."

=== Final stages ===
July 17
Semi-Final

Dublin	9-2 – 2-0	Down

Mayobridge

August 2
Final

Dublin	8-4 – 1-3	Tipperary

Croke Park

Dublin	Tipperary

DUBLIN:
GK	1	Eileen Duffy (Celtic)
FB	2	Doretta Blackton (Celtic)
RWB	3	Carmel Walsh (CIÉ)
CB	4	Pauli Duff (Celtic)
LWB	5	Sheila Donnelly (Eoghan Rua)
MF	6	Nancy Caffrey (Eoghan Rua)
MF	7	Anette Corrigan (UCD)
MF	8	Kathleen Mills (CIÉ)
RWF	9	Úna O'Connor (Celtic) (4-1)
CF	10	Sheila Sleator (Eoghan Rua) (1-0)
LWF	11	Ellen Bourke (UCD)
FF	12	Sophie Brack (Capt) (CIÉ) (3-3)

TIPPERARY:
GK	1	Maura Treacy (Elmville)
FB	2	Kitty Callanan (Clonmel)
RWB	3	Kitty Kirwan (Roscrea)
CB	4	Mary Ann O'Brien (Roscrea) (Capt) (0-1)
LWB	5	Mary Morris (Clonmel)
MF	6	Nancy Folly (Elmville)
MF	7	Mary England (Roscrea) (0-2)
MF	8	Katleen England (Roscrea)
RWF	9	Katleen Griffin (Roscrea) (1-0)
CF	10	Terry Griffin (Roscrea)
LWF	11	Katleen Downes (Roscrea)
FF	12	Tess O'Meara (Clonmel)

MATCH RULES

- 50 minutes
- Replay if scores level
- Maximum of 3 substitutions

== See also ==
- All-Ireland Senior Hurling Championship
- Wikipedia List of Camogie players
- National Camogie League
- Camogie All Stars Awards
- Ashbourne Cup

Preceded by All-Ireland Senior Camogie Championship 1952	All-Ireland Senior Camogie Championship; 1932 – present	Succeeded by All-Ireland Senior Camogie Championship 1954
