= 1966 All-Ireland Senior Camogie Championship final =

1966 All-Ireland Senior Camogie Final
- Event: All-Ireland Senior Camogie Championship 1966
Dublin	Antrim
2-2	0-6
- Date: 18 September 1966
- Venue: Croke Park, Dublin
- Referee: Bernie Byrne (Monaghan)
- Attendance: 3,500

The 1966 All-Ireland Senior Camogie Championship Final was the 35th All-Ireland Final and the deciding match of the 1966 All-Ireland Senior Camogie Championship, an inter-county camogie tournament for the top teams in Ireland.

Antrim were their own worst enemies, hitting sixteen wides (against five by Dublin), and they list by two. This was Dublin's tenth championship in a row, and would prove to be their last for eighteen years.
