= 2010 All-Ireland Senior Camogie Championship final =

2010 All-Ireland Senior Camogie Final
- Event: All-Ireland Senior Camogie Championship 2010
| Wexford | Galway |
| 1-12 | 1-10 |
- Date: 12 September 2010
- Venue: Croke Park, Dublin
- Man of the Match: Emer McDonnell (Cork)
- Referee: Karl O'Brien (Dublin)
- Attendance: 17,290

The 2010 All-Ireland Senior Camogie Championship Final, the 79th event of its type, is the culmination of the 2010 All-Ireland Senior Camogie Championship.

Wexford led 1-8 to 0-4 at half-time, Galway nearly staged a comeback, an injury time goal by Aisling Connolly, with the gap 2 points at the end.
