= 1978 All-Ireland Senior Camogie Championship final =

1978 All-Ireland Senior Camogie Final
- Event: All-Ireland Senior Camogie Championship 1978
Cork	Dublin
6-4	1-2
- Date: 17 September 1978
- Venue: Croke Park, Dublin
- Attendance: 4,000

The 1978 All-Ireland Senior Camogie Championship final, the 47th event of its type, is the culmination of the 1978 All-Ireland Senior Camogie Championship.

Cork bridged a five-year gap since their previous title with what would prove to be an easy victory.
