= 1963 All-Ireland Senior Camogie Championship final =

1963 All-Ireland Senior Camogie Final
- Event: All-Ireland Senior Camogie Championship 1963
Dublin	Antrim
7-3	2-5
- Date: 8 September 1963
- Venue: Croke Park, Dublin
- Referee: Gloria Lee (Kildare)
- Attendance: 3,500

The 1963 All-Ireland Senior Camogie Championship Final was the 32nd All-Ireland Final and the deciding match of the 1963 All-Ireland Senior Camogie Championship, an inter-county camogie tournament for the top teams in Ireland.

Dublin led 3-1 to 1-2 at half-time, mainly due to poor Antrim shooting.Bríd Keenan scored three second-half goals and won by double scores.
