= 1975 All-Ireland Senior Camogie Championship final =

1975 All-Ireland Senior Camogie Final
- Event: All-Ireland Senior Camogie Championship 1975
Wexford	Cork
4-3	1-2
- Date: 21 September 1975
- Venue: Croke Park, Dublin
- Referee: Jane Murphy (Galway)
- Attendance: 4,000

The 1975 All-Ireland Senior Camogie Championship Final, the 44th event of its type, is the culmination of the 1975 All-Ireland Senior Camogie Championship.

Wexford took what was only their second ever All-Ireland camogie title when they won the final with a shock victory against Cork.
