= 1936 All-Ireland Senior Camogie Championship final =

1936 All-Ireland Senior Camogie Final
- Event: All-Ireland Senior Camogie Championship 1936
Cork	Louth
6-4	3-3
- Date: 11 October 1936
- Venue: Croke Park, Dublin
- Referee: Peg Morris (Galway)
- Attendance: 2,000

The 1936 All-Ireland Senior Camogie Championship Final was the fifth All-Ireland Final and the deciding match of the 1936 All-Ireland Senior Camogie Championship, an inter-county camogie tournament for the top teams in Ireland.

Cork went 3–1 to 0–0 up early on and Louth never looked likely to prevent a three-in-a-row. K. Johnston, N. McDonnell and N. Hanratty hit goals for Louth, narrowing the gap to five points (4–4 to 3–2, but Cork won anyway.
