= 1956 All-Ireland Senior Camogie Championship =

Camogie championship

All-Ireland Senior Camogie Championship 1956
Winners
- Champions: Antrim (4th title)
- Captain: Madge Rainey

Runners-up
- Runners-up: Cork
- Captain: Lil Coughlan

The 1956 All-Ireland Senior Camogie Championship was the high point of the 1956 season in Camogie. The championship was won by Antrim who defeated Cork by a four-point margin in the final, having created a major surprise by defeating serial champions Dublin in the semi-final, and interrupting what would otherwise have been a run of 19 championships in a row by Dublin. The championship featured what were reportedly two of the best camogie matches in the history of the game in its 12-a-side phase, the final and the semi-final between Antrim and Dublin.

== Structure ==
Mayo refused to play Cork in the All-Ireland semi-final because of concerns about the polio outbreak there. The semi-final between Dublin and Antrim prevented a run of 19 Al Ireland finals in succession for Dublin. Maeve Gilroy scored 2-2 and Grace Connolly two goals, Mairead Rainey and Marion Kearns a goal each in Antrim’s 6-2 to 6-1 victory. The Irish News described it as

“what was generally voted the greatest camogie game ever played in Ulster. The game was characterised by spates of clever play on both side, with Dublin on the whole the more finished in accurate ground and overhead stickwork. At the three quarter stage they led 5-0 to 4-2 only to fall two points behind when Antrim scored their fifth goal. Dublin however regained the lead with their sixth goal a few minutes later. In a great rally, amid tense excitement, the Ulster champions fought back with great determination for Ita O'Reilly to place Marion Kearns, who crashed home what proved to the match winning goal with a magnificent cross-shot, which caught the Dublin defence out of position and their goalkeeper unsighted.

== Final ==
Teresa Kearns, the 14-year-old Antrim goalkeeper from Cloughmills, made a huge contribution to victory, stopping an array of shots from the Cork attack, including a memorable save from Noreen Duggan. Mitchel Cogley wrote in the Irish Independent

The youngest player on the field made probably the most significant contribution to Antrim’s victory. This was the 14-tyear-old Theresa Kearns, who with Antrim leading 4-3 to 4-2 and Cork pressing desperately, brought off a save from star Cork forward Noreen Duggan which equaled that of Art Foley from Christy Ring the previous week. The parallel went further for, from this escape, Antrim swept away for their fifth goal, which lcinched the issue and brought the title up north. There was nothing between two teams in fleetness of foot, skilful stickwork and length of striking, but Antrim’s defence was the sounder under heavy pressure and the positional play of the forwards was better than that of the Cork girls.

=== Final stages ===
September 9
Semi-Final

| Antrim | 6-2 – 6-1 | Dublin |

September 30
Final

| Antrim | 5-3 – 4-2 | Cork |

Croke Park

| Antrim | Cork |

ANTRIM:
| GK | 1 | Teresa Kearns |
| FB | 2 | Moya Forde |
| RWB | 3 | Ethna Dougan |
| CB | 4 | Winnie Kearns |
| LWB | 5 | Deirdre O’Gorman |
| MF | 6 | Eilis McCamphill |
| MF | 7 | Ita O’Reilly (0-1) |
| MF | 8 | Maeve Gilroy (0-1) |
| RWF | 9 | Marion Kearns (2-0) |
| CF | 10 | Madge Rainey (1-0) (Capt) |
| LWF | 11 | Chris Hughes (1-1) |
| FF | 12 | Grace Connolly (1-0) |

CORK:
| GK | 1 | Sheila Cahill |
| FB | 2 | Bridie Lucey |
| RWB | 3 | Betty Walsh |
| CB | 4 | Joan Clancy |
| LWB | 5 | Teresa Murphy |
| MF | 6 | Lil Coughlan (Captain) |
| MF | 7 | Lily McKay |
| MF | 8 | Anna Crotty (1-0) |
| RWF | 9 | Angela Lane (2-0) |
| CF | 10 | Noreen Duggan (0-2) |
| LWF | 11 | Mona Joyce |
| FF | 12 | Maura Hayes (1-0). |
Substitutes:
| LCF | | L Magowan for Murphy (substituted in) 36' |
| CF | | M Maloney for Coughlan (substituted in) 49' |

MATCH RULES

- 50 minutes
- Replay if scores level
- Maximum of 3 substitutions

== See also ==
- All-Ireland Senior Hurling Championship
- Wikipedia List of Camogie players
- National Camogie League
- Camogie All Stars Awards
- Ashbourne Cup

| Preceded by All-Ireland Senior Camogie Championship 1955 | All-Ireland Senior Camogie Championship; 1932 – present | Succeeded by All-Ireland Senior Camogie Championship 1957 |
