= 1989 All-Ireland Senior Camogie Championship final =

1989 All-Ireland Senior Camogie Final
- Event: All-Ireland Senior Camogie Championship 1989
Kilkenny	Dublin
3-10	2-5
- Date: 24 September 1989
- Venue: Croke Park, Dublin
- Referee: Kathleen Quinn (Galway)
- Attendance: 3,024

The 1989 All-Ireland Senior Camogie Championship Final, the 58th event of its type, is the culmination of the 1989 All-Ireland Senior Camogie Championship.

Dublin had an easy eight point win, Angela Downey scoring 2-1 (losing her skirt while scoring one goal

it was before the TV so photos).
