= 1973 All-Ireland Senior Camogie Championship final =

1973 All-Ireland Senior Camogie Final
- Event: All-Ireland Senior Camogie Championship 1973
Cork	Antrim
2-5	3-1
- Date: 16 September 1973
- Venue: Croke Park, Dublin
- Referee: Phyllis Breslin ( Dublin)
- Attendance: 4,000

The 1973 All-Ireland Senior Camogie Championship Final, the 42nd event of its type, is the culmination of the 1973 All-Ireland Senior Camogie Championship.

It was Cork ended up winning the game and ended up taking the title by the narrowest of margins.
