= 1965 All-Ireland Senior Camogie Championship final =

1965 All-Ireland Senior Camogie Final
- Event: All-Ireland Senior Camogie Championship 1965
| Dublin | Tipperary |
| 10-1 | 5-3 |
- Date: 19 September 1965
- Venue: Croke Park, Dublin
- Referee: Nuala Kavanagh (Sligo)
- Attendance: 3,500
- Weather: Windy

The 1965 All-Ireland Senior Camogie Championship Final was the 34th All-Ireland Final and the deciding match of the 1965 All-Ireland Senior Camogie Championship, an inter-county camogie tournament for the top teams in Ireland.

Tipperary had the wind in the first half, and were only two down shortly after the break, but four quick Dublin goals ended the game as a contest. Judy Doyle scored five goals.
