= 1972 All-Ireland Senior Camogie Championship final =

1972 All-Ireland Senior Camogie Final
- Event: All-Ireland Senior Camogie Championship 1972
Cork	Kilkenny
2-5	1-4
- Date: 17 September 1972
- Venue: Croke Park, Dublin
- Referee: Lily Spence (Antrim)
- Attendance: 4,000

The 1972 All-Ireland Senior Camogie Championship Final, the 41st event of its type, is the culmination of the 1972 All-Ireland Senior Camogie Championship.

The marking was tight on both sides and this impeded the quality of play; Cork won by four points, mostly due to their superior defence.
