= 1995 All-Ireland Senior Camogie Championship final =

1995 All-Ireland Senior Camogie Final
- Event: All-Ireland Senior Camogie Championship 1995
Cork	Kilkenny
4-8	2-10
- Date: 24 September 1995
- Venue: Croke Park, Dublin
- Referee: Áine Derham (Dublin)
- Attendance: 9,874

The 1995 All-Ireland Senior Camogie Championship Final, the 64th event of its type, is the culmination of the 1995 All-Ireland Senior Camogie Championship.

A late goal sealed the victory for Cork. This was Cork's first defeat of Kilkenny in the final in six attempts.
