= 2001 All-Ireland Senior Camogie Championship final =

2001 All-Ireland Senior Camogie Final
- Event: All-Ireland Senior Camogie Championship 2001
Tipperary	Kilkenny
4-13	1-6
- Date: 16 September 2001
- Venue: Croke Park, Dublin
- Referee: Áine Derham (Dublin)
- Attendance: 16,354
- Weather: Windy

The 2001 All-Ireland Senior Camogie Championship Final, the 70th event of its type, is the culmination of the 2001 All-Ireland Senior Camogie Championship.

Tipperary had the wind in the first half, and ran up an eleven-point lead by half-time. Deirdre Hughes was top scorer with 2-2.
