= 2005 All-Ireland Senior Camogie Championship final =

2005 All-Ireland Senior Camogie Final
- Event: All-Ireland Senior Camogie Championship 2005
Cork	Tipperary
1-17	1-13
- Date: 18 September 2005
- Venue: Croke Park, Dublin
- Referee: John Pender (Kildare)
- Attendance: 14,350

The 2005 All-Ireland Senior Camogie Championship Final, the 74th event of its type, is the culmination of the 2005 All-Ireland Senior Camogie Championship.

Tipp led 1-10 to 0-8 at half-time, but Cork's persistence, as well as an Una O'Dwyer own goal, gave Tipp victory in the end.
