= 1999 All-Ireland Senior Camogie Championship final =

1999 All-Ireland Senior Camogie Final
- Event: All-Ireland Senior Camogie Championship 1999
Tipperary	Kilkenny
0-12	1-8
- Date: 5 September 1999
- Venue: Croke Park, Dublin
- Referee: Áine Derham (Dublin)
- Attendance: 15,084

The 1999 All-Ireland Senior Camogie Championship Final, the 68th event of its type, is the culmination of the 1999 All-Ireland Senior Camogie Championship.

Tipperary finally won an All-Ireland final at their eighth attempt. Kilkenny led 1-5 to 0-7 at half-time but Tipp outpaced them in the end.
