= 1941 All-Ireland Senior Camogie Championship final =

1941 All-Ireland Senior Camogie Final
- Event: All-Ireland Senior Camogie Championship 1941
Cork	Dublin
7-5	1-2
- Date: 12 October 1941
- Venue: Croke Park, Dublin
- Referee: Peg Morris (Galway)
- Attendance: 4,000

The 1941 All-Ireland Senior Camogie Championship Final was the tenth All-Ireland Final and the deciding match of the 1939 All-Ireland Senior Camogie Championship, an inter-county camogie tournament for the top teams in Ireland.

Cork led 4–5 to no score at half-time. Kathleen Buckley scored six goals.
