= 1991 All-Ireland Senior Camogie Championship final =

1991 All-Ireland Senior Camogie Final
- Event: All-Ireland Senior Camogie Championship 1991
Kilkenny	Cork
3-8	0-10
- Date: 22 September 1991
- Venue: Croke Park, Dublin
- Referee: Miriam O'Callaghan (Offaly)
- Attendance: 4,000

The 1991 All-Ireland Senior Camogie Championship Final, the 60th event of its type, is the culmination of the 1991 All-Ireland Senior Camogie Championship.

Kilkenny won by seven points, to complete a seven-in-a-row.
