= 1957 All-Ireland Senior Camogie Championship final =

1957 All-Ireland Senior Camogie Final
- Event: All-Ireland Senior Camogie Championship 1957
Dublin	Antrim
3-3	3-1
- Date: 6 August 1957
- Venue: Croke Park, Dublin
- Referee: Noreen Murphy (Cork)
- Attendance: 7,000

The 1957 All-Ireland Senior Camogie Championship Final was the 26th All-Ireland Final and the deciding match of the 1957 All-Ireland Senior Camogie Championship, an inter-county camogie tournament for the top teams in Ireland.

Antrim led 2–1 to 0–2 at half-time but Dublin gradually wore them down, Bríd Reid scoring a last-minute winning goal after Eilish Campbell, Antrim's star player, had gone off injured.
