= 1986 All-Ireland Senior Camogie Championship final =

1986 All-Ireland Senior Camogie Final
- Event: All-Ireland Senior Camogie Championship 1986
Kilkenny	Dublin
2-12	2-3
- Date: 14 September 1986
- Venue: Croke Park, Dublin
- Referee: Betty Joyce (Cork)
- Attendance: 5,000

The 1986 All-Ireland Senior Camogie Championship Final, the 55th event of its type, is the culmination of the 1986 All-Ireland Senior Camogie Championship.

Angela and Ann Downey were the stars (as they were again the year after) as Kilkenny retained their title.
