= 2002 All-Ireland Senior Camogie Championship final =

2002 All-Ireland Senior Camogie Final
- Event: All-Ireland Senior Camogie Championship 2002
Cork	Tipperary
4-9	1-9
- Date: 15 September 2002
- Venue: Croke Park, Dublin
- Referee: Aileen Lawlor (Westmeath)
- Attendance: 13,287

The 2002 All-Ireland Senior Camogie Championship Final, the 71st event of its type, is the culmination of the 2002 All-Ireland Senior Camogie Championship.

"Pocket-Rocket" Fiona O'Driscoll scored 3–2 to prevent a Tipp four-in-a-row.
