= 1971 All-Ireland Senior Camogie Championship final =

1971 All-Ireland Senior Camogie Final
- Event: All-Ireland Senior Camogie Championship 1971
Cork	Wexford
4-6	1-2
- Date: 19 September 1971
- Venue: Croke Park, Dublin
- Referee: Lily Spence (Antrim)
- Attendance: 4,000

The 1971 All-Ireland Senior Camogie Championship Final, the fortieth event of its type, is the culmination of the 1971 All-Ireland Senior Camogie Championship.

Cork won their second title in a row.
