= 1976 All-Ireland Senior Camogie Championship final =

1976 All-Ireland Senior Camogie Final
- Event: All-Ireland Senior Camogie Championship 1976
Kilkenny	Dublin
0-6	1-2
- Date: 19 September 1976
- Venue: Croke Park, Dublin
- Attendance: 6,000

The 1976 All-Ireland Senior Camogie Championship Final, the 45th event of its type, is the culmination of the 1976 All-Ireland Senior Camogie Championship.

In what proved to be a low-scoring final, Kilkenny did become the first team to triumph with the winning of an All-Ireland title without scoring a goal, with the Cats doing it in spite of having trailed by 0-3 to 0-2 at the break and despite the Dubs also scoring the game's only goal.
