= 1981 All-Ireland Senior Camogie Championship final =

1981 All-Ireland Senior Camogie Final
- Event: All-Ireland Senior Camogie Championship 1981
Kilkenny	Cork
3-9	3-9
- Date: 13 September 1981
- Venue: Croke Park, Dublin
- Referee: Phyllis Breslin (Dublin)
- Attendance: 3,000

1981 All-Ireland Senior Camogie Final Replay
Kilkenny	Cork
1-9	0-7
- Date: 4 October 1981
- Venue: Croke Park, Dublin
- Referee: Phyllis Breslin (Dublin)
- Attendance: 3,000
- Weather: Rain

The 1981 All-Ireland Senior Camogie Championship Final, the fiftieth event of its type, is the culmination of the 1981 All-Ireland Senior Camogie Championship.

A pitch intruder disputing with the referee meant that five minutes of stoppage time had to be played, which was enough for Kilkenny to close a six-point gap in the last eight minutes. In the replay, Cork lost Claire Cronin to injury and a late Angela Downey goal gave the Cats a flattering five-point win. Was the pitch intruder a Cat?
