= 2004 All-Ireland Senior Camogie Championship final =

2004 All-Ireland Senior Camogie Final
- Event: All-Ireland Senior Camogie Championship 2004
Tipperary	Cork
2-11	0-9
- Date: 19 September 2004
- Venue: Croke Park, Dublin
- Referee: Úna Kearney (Armagh)
- Attendance: 24,567

The 2004 All-Ireland Senior Camogie Championship Final, the 73rd event of its type, is the culmination of the 2004 All-Ireland Senior Camogie Championship.

This final marked the centenary of the first camogie match, played in 1904. Tipperary won easily, Claire Grogan scoring nine points.
