= 1946 All-Ireland Senior Camogie Championship final =

1946 All-Ireland Senior Camogie Final
- Event: All-Ireland Senior Camogie Championship 1946
Antrim	Galway
4-1	2-3
- Date: 29 September 1946
- Venue: Corrigan Park, Belfast
- Referee: Seán Gleeson (Tipperary)
- Attendance: 5,000

The 1946 All-Ireland Senior Camogie Championship Final was the fifteenth All-Ireland Final and the deciding match of the 1946 All-Ireland Senior Camogie Championship, an inter-county camogie tournament for the top teams in Ireland.

Antrim's superior speed gave them a four-point win.
