= 1961 All-Ireland Senior Camogie Championship final =

1961 All-Ireland Senior Camogie Final
- Event: All-Ireland Senior Camogie Championship 1961
Dublin	Tipperary
7-2	4-1
- Date: 8 October 1961
- Venue: Croke Park, Dublin
- Referee: Maeve Gilroy (Antrim)
- Attendance: 2,800
- Weather: Windy, hot

The 1961 All-Ireland Senior Camogie Championship Final was the thirtieth All-Ireland Final and the deciding match of the 1961 All-Ireland Senior Camogie Championship, an inter-county camogie tournament for the top teams in Ireland.

Tipperary's prospects looked strong at half-time: after playing against the wind with the sun in their eyes, they were only a point down. But Dublin won in end, with Kathleen Mills finishing her career with a record fifteenth All-Ireland medal. Judy Doyle (Dublin) scored a hat-trick.
