= 1954 All-Ireland Senior Camogie Championship =

Camogie championship

All-Ireland Senior Camogie Championship 1954
Winners
- Champions: Dublin (14th title)
- Captain: Sophie Brack

Runners-up
- Runners-up: Derry
- Captain: Patsy McCloskey

Other
- Matches played: 2

The 1954 All-Ireland Senior Camogie Championship was the high point of the 1954 season in Camogie. The championship was won by Dublin who defeated first time finalists Derry by an 18-point margin in the final.

== Final ==
Una O'Connor, Sophie Brack and Sheila Sleator shared ten goals. Rose McAllister, Patsy McCloskey, Anna Bryson and Patsy O'Brien scored Derry goals. The Irish Press noted:

One of the biggest crowds ever turned up at Croke Park on Sunday evening last to see the All Ireland camogie final in which Dublin won the title for the seventh successive year. The Derry girls put up a splendid fight and were rather better than the score suggests, but they were unable to match the stickwork and combination of the more experienced Dublin line-out. Derry did well at the start but could not turn their early advantage into scores and when Dublin settled into their stride they advanced steadily to victory. Dublin led by 6-1 to nil at half-time. There was only one free in the entire game.

=== Final stages ===
Semi-Final

Dublin	5-3 – 3-1	Cork

Croke Park

Home Semi-Final

Derry	5-2 – 0-0	Mayo

Newport

Semi-Final

Derry	3-11 – 0-3	London

Greenlough

August 22
Final

Dublin	10-4 – 4-2	Derry

Croke Park

Dublin	Derry

DUBLIN:
GK	1	Eileen Duffy (Celtic)
FB	2	Doretta Blackton (Celtic)
RWB	3	Betty Hughes (CIÉ)
CB	4	Carmel Walsh (CIÉ)
LWB	5	Sheila Donnelly (Eoghan Rua)
MF	6	Nancy Caffrey (Eoghan Rua)
MF	7	Annette Corrigan (UCD) (0-3)
MF	8	Kathleen Mills (CIÉ)
RWF	9	Úna O'Connor (Celtic) (4-0)
CF	10	Sheila Sleator (Eoghan Rua) (2-0)
LWF	11	Eileen Bourke (UCD)
FF	12	Sophie Brack (Capt) (CIÉ) (Capt) (4-1)

DERRY:
GK	1	Anna McPeake
FB	2	Theresa Clarke
RWB	3	Teresa Halferty
CB	4	Carrie Rankin
LWB	5	Margaret Dorrity
MF	6	Mary McSwiggan
MF	7	Patsy McCloskey (Capt) (1-2)
MF	8	Kathleen McCloskey
RWF	9	Kathleen Madden
CF	10	Patsy O'Brien (1-0)
LWF	11	Anna Bryson (1-0)
FF	12	Rose McAllister (1-0)

MATCH RULES

- 50 minutes
- Replay if scores level
- Maximum of 3 substitutions

== See also ==
- All-Ireland Senior Hurling Championship
- Wikipedia List of Camogie players
- National Camogie League
- Camogie All Stars Awards
- Ashbourne Cup

Preceded by All-Ireland Senior Camogie Championship 1953	All-Ireland Senior Camogie Championship; 1932 – present	Succeeded by All-Ireland Senior Camogie Championship 1955
