= 2012 All-Ireland Senior Camogie Championship final =

2012 All-Ireland Senior Camogie Final
- Event: All-Ireland Senior Camogie Championship 2012
Wexford	Cork
3-13	3-6
- Date: 16 September 2012
- Venue: Croke Park, Dublin
- Referee: A Lagrue (Kildare)
- Attendance: 15,900

The 2012 All-Ireland Senior Camogie Championship Final, the 81st event of its type, is the culmination of the 2012 All-Ireland Senior Camogie Championship.

Wexford won by seven points.
