= 1987 All-Ireland Senior Camogie Championship final =

1987 All-Ireland Senior Camogie Final
- Event: All-Ireland Senior Camogie Championship 1987
Kilkenny	Cork
3-10	1-7
- Date: 26 September 1987
- Venue: Croke Park, Dublin
- Referee: Anne Redmond (Dublin)
- Attendance: 5,496

The 1987 All-Ireland Senior Camogie Championship Final, the 56th event of its type, is the culmination of the 1987 All-Ireland Senior Camogie Championship.

Again, the final was dominated by the Downey sisters, with Kilkenny winning by ten points.
