= 1982 All-Ireland Senior Camogie Championship final =

1982 All-Ireland Senior Camogie Final
- Event: All-Ireland Senior Camogie Championship 1982
Cork	Dublin
2-7	2-6
- Date: 26 September 1982
- Venue: Croke Park, Dublin
- Referee: Belle O'Loughlin (Down)
- Attendance: 3,000

The 1982 All-Ireland Senior Camogie Championship Final, the 51st event of its type, is the culmination of the 1982 All-Ireland Senior Camogie Championship.

This was a year when Cork broke Dublin hearts and went away with the cup and with the title with a last-second goal.
