= 1990 All-Ireland Senior Camogie Championship final =

1990 All-Ireland Senior Camogie Final
- Event: All-Ireland Senior Camogie Championship 1990
Kilkenny	Wexford
1-14	0-7
- Date: 23 September 1990
- Venue: Croke Park, Dublin
- Referee: Miriam Murphy (Cork)
- Attendance: 4,000

The 1990 All-Ireland Senior Camogie Championship Final, the 59th event of its type, is the culmination of the 1990 All-Ireland Senior Camogie Championship.

Wexford did score the first point, but thereafter it was all in favour of Kilkenny with the Downey sisters got 1-9 between them.
