= 1974 All-Ireland Senior Camogie Championship final =

1974 All-Ireland Senior Camogie Final
- Event: All-Ireland Senior Camogie Championship 1974
Kilkenny	Cork
4-5	3-8
- Date: 15 September 1974
- Venue: Croke Park, Dublin
- Referee: Jane Murphy (Galway)
- Attendance: 4,000

1974 All-Ireland Senior Camogie Final Replay
Kilkenny	Cork
3-3	1-5
- Date: 6 October 1974
- Venue: Croke Park, Dublin
- Referee: Jane Murphy (Galway)
- Attendance: 5,000

The 1974 All-Ireland Senior Camogie Championship Final, the 43rd event of its type, is the culmination of the 1974 All-Ireland Senior Camogie Championship.

Cork led in the first game by a point at the half-time break, and the game stayed close right up until the end. Kilkenny sealed their first-ever All-Ireland camogie title in the replay, having a lead of 2–1 to 1–0 at the half-time break and retaining that lead right up until the end.
