= 1969 All-Ireland Senior Camogie Championship final =

1969 All-Ireland Senior Camogie Final
- Event: All-Ireland Senior Camogie Championship 1969
Wexford	Antrim
4-4	4-2
- Date: 21 September 1969
- Venue: Croke Park, Dublin
- Referee: Lil O'Grady (Cork)
- Attendance: 4,500
- Weather: Windy

The 1969 All-Ireland Senior Camogie Championship Final was the 38th All-Ireland Final and the deciding match of the 1969 All-Ireland Senior Camogie Championship, an inter-county camogie tournament for the top teams in Ireland.

Wexford had the wind for the first half, and led 2–3 to 1–0 at the break, Mairéad McAtamney keeping Antrim in the game. Antrim narrowed the gap to two points, and the remainder of the game was touch and go, Catherine Power scoring a late goal to seal Wexford's two-in-a-row.
