= 2007 All-Ireland Senior Camogie Championship final =

2007 All-Ireland Senior Camogie Final
- Event: All-Ireland Senior Camogie Championship 2007
Wexford	Cork
2-7	1-8
- Date: 9 September 2006
- Venue: Croke Park, Dublin
- Man of the Match: Mary Leacy (Wexford)
- Referee: John Morrissey (Tipperary)
- Attendance: 33,154

The 2007 All-Ireland Senior Camogie Championship Final, the 76th event of its type, is the culmination of the 2007 All-Ireland Senior Camogie Championship. This is also the biggest ever attendance for a camogie final - 33,154

Wexford led 2-2 to 0-3 at half-time and kept that lead throughout, giving them their first title for thirty-two years.
