= 1992 All-Ireland Senior Camogie Championship final =

1992 All-Ireland Senior Camogie Final
- Event: All-Ireland Senior Camogie Championship 1992
Cork	Wexford
1-20	2-6
- Date: 27 September 1992
- Venue: Croke Park, Dublin
- Referee: Áine Derham (Dublin)
- Attendance: 4,000

The 1992 All-Ireland Senior Camogie Championship Final, the 61st event of its type, is the culmination of the 1992 All-Ireland Senior Camogie Championship.

Wexford went into the lead with a goal in the first half, but Cork led 1-6 to 1-3 anyway at the halfway mark and won by eleven points in the end, mostly due to their forward player's accurate shooting: scoring ten points, nine of them frees.
