= 1977 All-Ireland Senior Camogie Championship final =

1977 All-Ireland Senior Camogie Final
- Event: All-Ireland Senior Camogie Championship 1977
Kilkenny	Wexford
3-4	1-3
- Date: 18 September 1977
- Venue: Croke Park, Dublin
- Referee: Mary Lynch (Monaghan)
- Attendance: 4,000

The 1977 All-Ireland Senior Camogie Championship Final, the 46th event of its type, is the culmination of the 1977 All-Ireland Senior Camogie Championship.

Kilkenny won a one-sided game. A young Angela Downey was the star, and scored 2-3.
