= 2011 All-Ireland Senior Camogie Championship final =

2011 All-Ireland Senior Camogie Final
- Event: All-Ireland Senior Camogie Championship 2011
Wexford	Galway
2-7	1-8
- Date: 11 September 2011
- Venue: Croke Park, Dublin
- Referee: Mike O'Kelly (Cork)

The 2011 All-Ireland Senior Camogie Championship Final, the 80th event of its type, is the culmination of the 2011 All-Ireland Senior Camogie Championship.

Wexford won by two points.
