= 1935 All-Ireland Senior Camogie Championship final =

1935 All-Ireland Senior Camogie Final
- Event: All-Ireland Senior Camogie Championship 1935
Cork	Dublin
3-4	4-0
- Date: 24 November 1935
- Venue: Cork Athletic Grounds, Cork
- Referee: Tommie Ryan (Tipperary)
- Attendance: 2,000

The 1935 All-Ireland Senior Camogie Championship Final was the fourth All-Ireland Final and the deciding match of the 1935 All-Ireland Senior Camogie Championship, an inter-county camogie tournament for the top teams in Ireland.

The home team won by a single point.
