= 1962 All-Ireland Senior Camogie Championship final =

1962 All-Ireland Senior Camogie Final
- Event: All-Ireland Senior Camogie Championship 1962
Dublin	Galway
5-5	2-0
- Date: 12 August 1962
- Venue: Croke Park, Dublin
- Referee: Maeve Gilroy (Antrim)
- Attendance: 3,000

The 1962 All-Ireland Senior Camogie Championship Final was the 31st All-Ireland Final and the deciding match of the 1962 All-Ireland Senior Camogie Championship, an inter-county camogie tournament for the top teams in Ireland.

Dublin won a sixth title in a row.
