= 1955 All-Ireland Senior Camogie Championship =

Camogie championship

All-Ireland Senior Camogie Championship 1955
Winners
- Champions: Dublin (15th title)
- Captain: Sophie Brack

Runners-up
- Runners-up: Cork
- Captain: Anna Crotty

Other
- Matches played: 2

The 1955 All-Ireland Senior Camogie Championship was the high point of the 1955 season in Camogie. The championship was won by Dublin who defeated Cork by an eight-point margin in the final. The match was played at Croke Park and attracted an attendance of 4,192.

== Championship ==
Mayo beat Galway by a remarkable 6–1 to nil in the Connacht final. They were beaten heavily by Dublin for whom Una O'Connor scored five goals and Sophie Brack three in the semi-final. A great display by Sheila Cahill in the Cork goal helped her county through the other semi-final.

== Final ==
The final was scheduled for August 21 alongside the All Ireland football semi-final but the pitch was so badly cut up by the Dublin v Mayo football semi-final and a thunderstorm caused its cancellation for a week. It meant Cork were able to call on star goalkeeper Sheila Cahill who was not available for the original fixture. The match took place at 7pc, and trains to Cork were delayed to enable supporters to return home, enabling an attendance of 4,192 (it was estimated just 200 had remained for the thunder storm the previous week).

== The Final ==
Cork took an early lead with a goal until Dublin fought back with three goals and a point in a three-minute spell. Dublin successfully defended their lead in a tense second half. Agnes Hourigan wrote in the Irish Press:

For speed, style, long striking and grand stickwork, this final must surely have been the greatest ever played. Through the opening twenty minutes Cork seemed set to win. Inspired by their captain Anna Crotty, who was everywhere, they were beating Dublin all round and deserved their two goals lead. Then a point from a free by Annette Corrigan gave Dublin heart and they got a grip on the game which, though often disputed, they never lost. Star of the Dublin revival was veteran Kathleen Mills, who in her 12th final (she won her tenth All Ireland medal last night) suddenly found her touch. An inspired spell ten minutes from the end of the first half, which brought them from six points behind to four points in front, set Dublin on the high road to victory.

== Aftermath ==
As a result of her performance, Sophie Brack became the first camogie player to be awarded the Irish Independent sports star of the week on the Friday after the final. Angela Lane’s brother Mick Lane of Dolphin, her brother in law Tom Kiernan and her son, Michael Kiernan were Irish rugby internationals. Eileen Duffy’s brother Billy played first team soccer for Arsenal. Cork goalkeeper, Sheila Cahill, married Donie O'Donovan who won Railway Cup medals with Munster and coached Cork to win the 1973 All-Ireland senior football title. Joan Clancy married West Ham soccer player, Jackie Morley and their son Pat Morley played soccer for Cork City, Shelbourne, Limerick and Waterford United. Sophie Brack captained Dublin to win six All-Ireland championships. Eileen Cronin married Paddy Hogan, who hurled for Laois in the 1949 All-Ireland final. Eileen Bourke was a sister of GAA historian, Marcus De Burca.

=== Final stages ===
July 10
Semi-Final

Dublin	11-5 – 1-0	Mayo

Parnell Park

July 10
Semi-Final

Cork	4-1 – 0-3	Antrim

Cork Athletic Grounds

August 28
Final

Dublin	9-2 – 5-6	Cork

Croke Park

Dublin	Cork

DUBLIN:
GK	1	Eileen Duffy (Celtic)
FB	2	Eileen Kelly (Eoghan Rua)
RWB	3	Betty Hughes (CIÉ)
CB	4	Eileen Cronin (Maurice O'Neills)
LWB	5	Sheila Donnelly (Eoghan Rua)
MF	6	Bríd Reid (Austin Stacks) (1-0)
MF	7	Annette Corrigan (UCD) (0-1)
MF	8	Kathleen Mills (CIÉ)
RWF	9	Fran Maher (Maurice O'Neills) (3-0)
CF	10	Eileen Bourke (UCD)
LWF	11	Úna O'Connor (Celtic) (2-1)
FF	12	Sophie Brack (CIÉ) (Capt) (3-0).

CORK:
GK	1	Sheila Cahill
FB	2	Betty Walsh
RWB	3	Bridie Lucey
CB	4	Teresa Murphy
LWB	5	Joan Clancy
MF	6	Anna Crotty (Capt) (0-3)
MF	7	Lily McKay
MF	8	Peg Lucey (substituted off) 42'
RWF	9	Angela Lane (1-1)
CF	10	Noreen Duggan (3-2)
LWF	11	Mona Joyce
FF	12	Maura Hayes (1-0). Sub used: Maura O’Connell
Substitutes:
MF		Maura O'Connell for Lucey (substituted in) 42'

MATCH RULES

- 50 minutes
- Replay if scores level
- Maximum of 3 substitutions

== See also ==
- All-Ireland Senior Hurling Championship
- Wikipedia List of Camogie players
- National Camogie League
- Camogie All Stars Awards
- Ashbourne Cup

Preceded by All-Ireland Senior Camogie Championship 1954	All-Ireland Senior Camogie Championship; 1932 – present	Succeeded by All-Ireland Senior Camogie Championship 1956
