= 2000 All-Ireland Senior Camogie Championship final =

2000 All-Ireland Senior Camogie Final
- Event: All-Ireland Senior Camogie Championship 2000
Tipperary	Cork
2-11	1-9
- Date: 3 September 2000
- Venue: Croke Park, Dublin
- Referee: Áine Derham (Dublin)
- Attendance: 12,880

The 2000 All-Ireland Senior Camogie Championship Final, the 69th event of its type, is the culmination of the 2000 All-Ireland Senior Camogie Championship.

The match was of a very high quality and Tipperary won by 5.
