= 1960 All-Ireland Senior Camogie Championship final =

1960 All-Ireland Senior Camogie Final
- Event: All-Ireland Senior Camogie Championship 1960
Dublin	Galway
6-2	2-0
- Date: 13 November 1960
- Venue: Croke Park, Dublin
- Referee: Eithne Neville (Limerick)
- Attendance: 2,800
- Weather: Cold and wet

The 1960 All-Ireland Senior Camogie Championship Final was the 29th All-Ireland Final and the deciding match of the 1960 All-Ireland Senior Camogie Championship, an inter-county camogie tournament for the top teams in Ireland.

Dublin led 3-2 to no score at half-time, Galway only managing a single shot in the first half, and Dublin won by 14 points. Kathleen Mills won her fourteenth All-Ireland medal.
