= 1984 All-Ireland Senior Camogie Championship final =

1984 All-Ireland Senior Camogie Final
- Event: All-Ireland Senior Camogie Championship 1984
Dublin	Tipperary
5-9	2-4
- Date: 9 September 1984
- Venue: Croke Park, Dublin
- Referee: Kathleen Quinn (Galway)
- Attendance: 4,219
- Weather: Windy

The 1984 All-Ireland Senior Camogie Championship Final, the 53rd event of its type, is the culmination of the 1984 All-Ireland Senior Camogie Championship.

Dublin had the wind for the first half and scored two lucky goals, leading 3–5 to 0–2 at the break and never looking like losing their lead.
