= 1983 All-Ireland Senior Camogie Championship final =

1983 All-Ireland Senior Camogie Final
- Event: All-Ireland Senior Camogie Championship 1982
Cork	Dublin
2-5	1-6
- Date: 25 September 1983
- Venue: Croke Park, Dublin
- Referee: Kathleen Quinn (Galway)
- Attendance: 3,413

The 1983 All-Ireland Senior Camogie Championship Final, the 52nd event of its type, is the culmination of the 1983 All-Ireland Senior Camogie Championship.

Despite Dublin going into the half-time break a lead of 1-4 to 1-3, in the second half a late goal gave Cork their fourth title in six years.
