= 2020 All-Ireland Senior Camogie Championship =

Gaelic sports competition

All-Ireland Senior Camogie Championship 2020
Championship details
- Dates: 17 October – 12 December 2020
- Teams: 11

All-Ireland champions
- Winners: Kilkenny (14th win)
- Captain: Lucinda Gahan
- Manager: Brian Dowling

All-Ireland runners-up
- Runners-up: Galway
- Captain: Sarah Dervan
- Manager: Cathal Murray

Championship statistics
- Matches played: 20

The 2020 All-Ireland Senior Camogie Championship – known as the Liberty Insurance Camogie Championship for sponsorship reasons – is the premier inter-county competition of the 2020 camogie season.

The winners receive the O'Duffy Cup. Due to the impact of the COVID-19 pandemic on Gaelic games, the tournament was delayed to the last months of the year, and was shortened to a season of twenty matches.

Instead original fixtures will be rescheduled for 2021 championships.

== Teams ==
Eleven county teams compete in the Senior Championship. 20 lower-ranked county teams compete in the Intermediate and Junior Championships.

== Format ==
Group Stage

The eleven teams are drawn into three groups. Groups 1 and 2 contain four teams; Group 3 contains three teams. Each team plays each other team in its group once. Three points are awarded for a win and one for a draw.

Knock-out stage

The runners-up in groups 1, 2 and 3 and the winners of Group 3 play in the quarter-finals.

The winners of groups 1 and 2 meet the quarter-final winners in the semi-finals.

== Group stage ==
Group games took place between 17 October and 8 November.

Key to colours
Advance to semi-finals
Advance to quarter-finals

=== Group 1 ===
Team	Pld	W	D	L	Diff	Pts
Galway	3	3	0	0	+36	9
Cork	3	2	0	1	+7	6
Wexford	3	1	0	2	–22	3
Offaly	3	0	0	3	–21	0

- Cork received a walkover from Offaly

=== Group 2 ===
Team	Pld	W	D	L	Diff	Pts
Kilkenny	3	3	0	0	+52	9
Waterford	3	2	0	1	+18	6
Westmeath	3	1	0	2	–41	3
Limerick	3	0	0	3	–29	0

=== Group 3 ===
Team	Pld	W	D	L	Diff	Pts
Tipperary	2	2	0	0	+14	6
Clare	2	1	0	1	+2	3
Dublin	2	0	0	2	–16	0

== Knockout stage ==
=== Quarter-finals ===
RTÉ Two

14 November 2020
13:00 GMT
Quarter-Final

Report

Clare	0-8 (8) – (24) 3-15	Cork
(HT: 0-06 – 0-07)
Pts: C Morey 4fs, A O’Loughlin 2, E Kelly 2		Gls: A O’Connor 2, K Mackey 1 Pts: Cronin 6 (4 f), K Mackey 3, A O’Connor 1, C Sigerson 1f, L Collins 1, S McCarthy 1, C Healy 1, H Looney 1

Páirc Uí Chaoimh, Cork
Referee: Liz Dempsey (Kilkenny)

RTÉ Two

14 November 2020
14:45 GMT
Quarter-Final

Report

Tipperary	1-12 (15) – (10) 0-10	Waterford
(HT: 0-08 – 0-06)
Gls: K Kennedy 1 Pts: C Devane 7 (5f), N Walsh 2, N Treacy 1, G O’Brien 1, M Campion 1		Pts: B Carton 5 (2fs, 1 45), N Rockett 2, A Flynn 2, S Lacey 1

Páirc Uí Chaoimh, Cork
Referee: John Dermody (Westmeath)

=== Semi-finals ===
RTÉ Two

28 November 2020
12:30 GMT
Semi-Final

Report

Cork	1-11 (14) – (16) 2-10	Kilkenny
(HT: 1-07 – 1-08)
Gls: G O’Connor 1 Pts: C Sigerson 4 (1f), O Cronin 3fs, K Mackey 2, A Thompson 2		Gls: A Dalton 1, M Walsh 1 Pts: D Gaule 7 (6fs), M O’Connell 2, A Dalton 1

Páirc Uí Chaoimh, Cork
Referee: Owen Elliott (Antrim)
Attendance: 0

RTÉ Two

28 November 2020
14:15 GMT
Semi-Final

Report

Galway	1-11 (14) – (8) 0-08	Tipperary
(HT: 1-06 – 0-05)
Gls: C Dolan 1 Pts: C Dolan 3 (1f, 1 '45'), O McGrath 2, S McGrath 2 (1 '45', 1 pen), A O’Reilly 1, R Hennelly 1, N Hanniffy 1, N Kilkenny 1		Pts: C Devane 6(4fs), R Howard 1, S Fryday 1

Páirc Uí Chaoimh, Cork
Referee: Ray Kelly (Kildare)
Attendance: 0

=== Final ===
RTÉ 2
Sky Sports

12 December 2020
19:00 GMT
Final

Report

Galway	1-11 (14) – (17) 1-14	Kilkenny
(HT: 1-05 – 0-06)
Gls: O McGrath 1 Pts: C Dolan 6(5fs), S McGrath 2, A O’Reilly 1, N Kilkenny 1, A Donohue 1		Gls: D Gaule 1(pen); Pts: D Gaule 6(4fs, 1 '45'), A Doyle 4, A Dalton 1, M O’Connell 1, K Nolan 1, G Walsh 1

Croke Park, Dublin
Referee: Owen Elliott (Antrim)
Attendance: 0
