= 1994 All-Ireland Senior Camogie Championship =

Camogie championship

All-Ireland Senior Camogie Championship 1994
Championship details
- Dates: June – 25 September 1994

All-Ireland champions
- Winners: Kilkenny (12th win)
- Captain: Ann Downey

All-Ireland runners-up
- Runners-up: Wexford
- Captain: Anna Reddy

Championship statistics
- Matches played: 7

The 1994 All-Ireland Senior Camogie Championship was the high point of the 1994 season. The championship was won by Killkenny who defeated Wexford by a nine-point margin in the final. The match drew an attendance of 5,000.

== Background ==
Angela Downey was coaxed out of retirement at the age of 37 by Kilkenny and her twin sister Ann Downey was named as captain and Kilkenny for the 1992 championship. Newcomers Michelle Fennelly, Sinéad Costello, Marie Meagher and Una Murphy joined the squad. Galway easily beat Kildare in the quarter-finals by 6–23 to 1–9 in St Conleth's Park.

== Semi-finals ==
The returned Angela Downey proved the match-winner once more in the semi-final at Ballinlough, scoring three goals in a three-point victory 4–9 to 2–12. Fiona Dunne, sister of Wexford hurler, Liam Dunne, scored 2–10 for Wexford as they beat Galway in the second semi-final. Galway goalkeeper Tracy Laheen scored a goal from a wind assisted puck-out and Olive Broderick added a second for Galway to lead by 2–2 to 0–3 after only ten minutes before Wexford took over and ran out easy winners by nine points, 3–14 to 2–5.

== Final ==
Angela Downey earned her 12th All Ireland medals despite the Wexford strategy of trying to curb the Downey twins. Stella Sinnott, in the words of Irish Times reporter Kathryn Davis, “stuck like a leech” to Angela in the opening ten minutes until a momentary lapse let her in for the first of two goals, flicked to the net despite the attention of three defenders from a Catherine Dunne pass. Wexford fought back from a 1–3 to 0-34 half time deficit to equalize nine minutes into the second half. A point three minutes later by substitute Brigid Banaville gave Kilkenny the impetus they needed and a second Angela Downey goal in the final minute added a gloss to the scoreline.

== Aftermath ==
Esme Murphy, a star on the Wexford minor team, was just 15 when she played in the All Ireland final. Wexford defeated Kilkenny by 2–9 to 1–10 in the Lienster final at Oylegate on 23 October, with goals by Angie Hearne and Paula Rankin.

=== Final stages ===
21 August
Semi-final

| Kilkenny | 4-9 – 2-12 | Cork |

Ballinlough

28 August
Semi-final

| Wexford | 3-14 – 2-5 | Galway |

Wexford Park

25 September
Final

| Kilkenny | 2-11 – 0-8 | Wexford |

Croke Park, Dublin

| Kilkenny | Wexford |

KILKENNY:
| GK | 1 | Michelle Fennelly (Ballyhale Shamrocks) |
| FB | 2 | Sinéad Costello (St Lachtain's) |
| RWB | 3 | Tracy Millea (St Brigid's Ballycallan) |
| CB | 4 | Gillian Dillon (St Lachtain's) |
| LWB | 5 | Deidre Maloney (St Brigid's Ballycallan) |
| MF | 6 | Marina Downey (Lisdowney) |
| MF | 7 | Ann Downey (Lisdowney) (Capt) (0-3) |
| MF | 8 | Marie Meagher (St Martin’s) |
| RWF | 9 | Bridget Mullally (Glenmore) (0-1) |
| CF | 10 | Catherine Dunne (Carrickshock) (substituted off) 41' |
| LWF | 11 | Angela Downey (Lisdowney) (2-3) |
| FF | 12 | Sinéad Millea (St Brigid's Ballycallan) (0-2) |
Substitutes:
| CF | | Bridget Banaville (Lisdowney) (0-1) for Dunne (substituted in) 41' |

WEXFORD:
| GK | 1 | Terri Butler (Buffers Alley) |
| FB | 2 | Catherine Murphy (Rathnure) |
| RWB | 3 | Stella Sinnott (Buffers Alley) |
| CB | 4 | Paula Rankin (0-1) |
| LWB | 5 | Mary Hayden (Rathnure) |
| MF | 6 | Angie Hearne |
| MF | 7 | Fiona Dunne (0-4) |
| MF | 8 | Orlaith Hernan (substituted in) 53' |
| RWF | 9 | Anne Marie O'Connor (Rathnure) (0-2) |
| CF | 10 | Marian O'Leary (Buffers Alley) |
| LWF | 11 | Esme Murphy (0-1) |
| FF | 12 | Anna Reddy (Rathnure) (Capt) (substituted off) 46' |
Substitutes:
| CF | | Geraldine Codd (Rathnure) for Reddy (substituted in) 46' |
| LCF | | Avis Nolan for Hernan (substituted in) 53' |

MATCH RULES

- 50 minutes
- Replay if scores level
- Maximum of 3 substitutions

== See also ==
- All-Ireland Senior Hurling Championship
- Wikipedia List of Camogie players
- National Camogie League
- Camogie All Stars Awards
- Ashbourne Cup

| Preceded by All-Ireland Senior Camogie Championship 1993 | All-Ireland Senior Camogie Championship; 1932 – present | Succeeded by All-Ireland Senior Camogie Championship 1995 |
