= 2022 All-Ireland Senior Camogie Championship =

Gaelic games season

All-Ireland Senior Camogie Championship 2022
Championship details
- Dates: 21 May – 7 August 2022
- Teams: 12

All-Ireland champions
- Winners: Kilkenny (15 win)
- Captain: Aoife Prendergast
- Manager: Brian Dowling

All-Ireland runners-up
- Runners-up: Cork
- Captain: Amy Lee
- Manager: Matthew Twomey

Championship statistics
- Matches played: 36

The 2022 All-Ireland Senior Camogie Championship, known for sponsorship reasons as the Glen Dimplex Senior All-Ireland Championship, is the premier inter-county competition of the 2022 camogie season.

== Teams ==
Twelve county teams compete in the Senior Championship. 22 lower-ranked county teams compete in the Intermediate and Junior Championships.

== Format ==
Group stage

The twelve teams are drawn into two groups of six teams. The top three teams in each group advance to the knockout stages.

Knock-out stage

The second- and third-placed teams in each group play in the quarter-finals. The quarter-final winners play the two group winners in the semi-finals.

The bottom team in each group play off to decide the team relegated to the Intermediate Championship.

== Group stage ==
=== Group 1 ===
Pos	Team	Pld	W	D	L	PF	PA	PD	Pts	Qualification
1	Cork	5	4	0	1	94	59	+35	12	Advance to All-Ireland semi-finals
2	Waterford	5	3	0	2	86	67	+19	9	Advance to All-Ireland quarter-finals
3	Dublin	5	2	2	1	71	67	+4	8	Advance to All-Ireland quarter-finals
4	Tipperary	5	2	2	1	68	72	−4	8	
5	Wexford	5	1	0	4	61	99	−38	3	
6	Clare	5	0	2	3	59	75	−16	2	Relegation playoff

Updated to match(es) played on 18 June 2022. Source: camogie.ie
Rules for classification: Tiebreakers

21 May 2022; 17:00; Group Stage Round 1	Waterford	0-12 (12) (14) 1-11	Dublin	Walsh Park; Referee: Andy Larkin
21 May 2022; 17:00; Group Stage Round 1		Report		Walsh Park; Referee: Andy Larkin

21 May 2022; 17:00; Group Stage Round 1	Wexford	1-06 (9) (20) 2-14	Cork	Bellefield Road, Enniscorthy; Referee: Gavin Donnegan
21 May 2022; 17:00; Group Stage Round 1		Report		Bellefield Road, Enniscorthy; Referee: Gavin Donnegan

21 May 2022; 17:00; Group Stage Round 1	Tipperary	0-10 (10) (10) 0-10	Clare	The Ragg; Referee: Justin Heffernan
21 May 2022; 17:00; Group Stage Round 1		Report		The Ragg; Referee: Justin Heffernan

28 May 2022; 13:00; Group Stage Round 2	Dublin	0-10 (10) (10) 0-10	Tipperary	Parnell Park; Referee: Liz Dempsey
28 May 2022; 13:00; Group Stage Round 2		Report		Parnell Park; Referee: Liz Dempsey

28 May 2022; 17:00; Group Stage Round 2	Waterford	3-18 (27) (9) 0-09	Wexford	Walsh Park; Referee: Cathal McAllister
28 May 2022; 17:00; Group Stage Round 2		Report		Walsh Park; Referee: Cathal McAllister

28 May 2022; 18:00; Group Stage Round 2	Cork	2-17 (23) (11) 2-05	Clare	Páirc Uí Rinn; Referee: Ray Kelly
28 May 2022; 18:00; Group Stage Round 2		Report		Páirc Uí Rinn; Referee: Ray Kelly

4 June 2022; 14:00; Group Stage Round 3	Clare	0-11 (11) (12) 1-09	Wexford	Sixmilebridge; Referee: Ray Kelly
4 June 2022; 14:00; Group Stage Round 3		Report		Sixmilebridge; Referee: Ray Kelly

4 June 2022; 17:00; Group Stage Round 3	Dublin	0-09 (9) (16) 2-10	Cork	St Peregrines GAA; Referee: Justin Heffernan
4 June 2022; 17:00; Group Stage Round 3		Report		St Peregrines GAA; Referee: Justin Heffernan

5 June 2022; 14:00; Group Stage Round 3	Tipperary	0-13 (13) (19) 1-16	Waterford	Semple Stadium; Referee: Ray Kelly
5 June 2022; 14:00; Group Stage Round 3		Report		Semple Stadium; Referee: Ray Kelly

18 June 2022; 14:00; Group Stage Round 4	Wexford	1-11 (14) (15) 0-15	Tipperary	Bellefield Road, Enniscorthy; Referee: Liz Dempsey
18 June 2022; 14:00; Group Stage Round 4		Report		Bellefield Road, Enniscorthy; Referee: Liz Dempsey

18 June 2022; 17:00; Group Stage Round 4	Clare	1-09 (12) (12) 1-09	Dublin	Cusack Park; Referee: John Dermody
18 June 2022; 17:00; Group Stage Round 4		Report		Cusack Park; Referee: John Dermody

18 June 2022; 17:30; Group Stage Round 4	Waterford	0-10 (10) (16) 0-16	Cork	Walsh Park; Referee: Ray Kelly
18 June 2022; 17:30; Group Stage Round 4		Report		Walsh Park; Referee: Ray Kelly

2 July 2022; 16:00; Group Stage Round 5	Clare	1-12 (15) (18) 1-15	Waterford	Cusack Park; Referee: Gavin Donegan
2 July 2022; 16:00; Group Stage Round 5		Report		Cusack Park; Referee: Gavin Donegan

2 July 2022; 16:00; Group Stage Round 5	Cork	1-16 (19) (20) 1-17	Tipperary	Páirc Uí Rinn; Referee: Justin Heffernan
2 July 2022; 16:00; Group Stage Round 5		Report		Páirc Uí Rinn; Referee: Justin Heffernan

2 July 2022; 16:00; Group Stage Round 5	Wexford	2-11 (17) (26) 4-14	Dublin	Bellefield Road, Enniscorthy; Referee: John Dermody
2 July 2022; 16:00; Group Stage Round 5		Report		Bellefield Road, Enniscorthy; Referee: John Dermody

=== Group 2 ===
Pos	Team	Pld	W	D	L	PF	PA	PD	Pts	Qualification
1	Galway	5	4	1	0	116	51	+65	13	Advance to All-Ireland semi-finals
2	Kilkenny	5	4	1	0	114	64	+50	13	Advance to All-Ireland quarter-finals
3	Limerick	5	3	0	2	61	82	−21	9	Advance to All-Ireland quarter-finals
4	Antrim	5	1	1	3	77	86	−9	4	
5	Down	5	1	1	3	60	103	−43	4	
6	Offaly	5	0	0	5	57	99	−42	0	Relegation playoff

Updated to match(es) played on 25 June 2022. Source: camogie.ie
Rules for classification: Tiebreakers

21 May 2022; 15:00; Group Stage Round 1	Down	1-10 (13) (26) 1-23	Kilkenny	Liatroim Fontenoys GAC; Referee: Eamon Cassidy
21 May 2022; 15:00; Group Stage Round 1		Report		Liatroim Fontenoys GAC; Referee: Eamon Cassidy

21 May 2022; 15:30; Group Stage Round 1	Galway	4-11 (23) (10) 1-07	Limerick	Pearse Stadium; Referee: Aaron Hogg
21 May 2022; 15:30; Group Stage Round 1		Report		Pearse Stadium; Referee: Aaron Hogg

21 May 2022; 17:00; Group Stage Round 1	Offaly	1-10 (13) (30) 4-18	Antrim	St. Brendan's Park; Referee: Barry Nea
21 May 2022; 17:00; Group Stage Round 1		Report		St. Brendan's Park; Referee: Barry Nea

28 May 2022; 14:00; Group Stage Round 2	Down	1-12 (15) (15) 1-12	Antrim	Ballycran; Referee: John Dermody
28 May 2022; 14:00; Group Stage Round 2		Report		Ballycran; Referee: John Dermody

28 May 2022; 16:00; Group Stage Round 2	Kilkenny	1-21 (27) (6) 0-06	Limerick	Nowlan Park; Referee: Andy Larkin
28 May 2022; 16:00; Group Stage Round 2		Report		Nowlan Park; Referee: Andy Larkin

28 May 2022; 17:00; Group Stage Round 2	Offaly	1-06 (9) (18) 2-12	Galway	St. Brendan's Park; Referee: Philip McDonald
28 May 2022; 17:00; Group Stage Round 2		Report		St. Brendan's Park; Referee: Philip McDonald

11 June 2022; 14:00; Group Stage Round 3	Galway	3-23 (29) (6) 0-06	Down	Kenny Park, Athenry; Referee: Gavin Donegan
11 June 2022; 14:00; Group Stage Round 3		Report		Kenny Park, Athenry; Referee: Gavin Donegan

11 June 2022; 14:00; Group Stage Round 3	Antrim	1-09 (12) (18) 1-15	Kilkenny	Dunloy; Referee: Barry Nea
11 June 2022; 14:00; Group Stage Round 3		Report		Dunloy; Referee: Barry Nea

11 June 2022; 17:00; Group Stage Round 3	Limerick	0-11 (11) (9) 0-09	Offaly	Cappamore; Referee: Liz Dempsey
11 June 2022; 17:00; Group Stage Round 3		Report		Cappamore; Referee: Liz Dempsey

25 June 2022; 14:00; Group Stage Round 4	Kilkenny	3-17 (26) (13) 2-07	Offaly	Nowlan Park; Referee: Cathal McAllister
25 June 2022; 14:00; Group Stage Round 4		Report		Nowlan Park; Referee: Cathal McAllister

25 June 2022; 16:00; Group Stage Round 4	Antrim	0-06 (6) (23) 2-17	Galway	Dunloy; Referee: John Dermody
25 June 2022; 16:00; Group Stage Round 4		Report		Dunloy; Referee: John Dermody

25 June 2022; 16:00; Group Stage Round 4	Limerick	2-11 (17) (12) 0-12	Down	Cappamore; Referee: Justin Heffernan
25 June 2022; 16:00; Group Stage Round 4		Report		Cappamore; Referee: Justin Heffernan

2 July 2022; 16:00; Group Stage Round 5	Antrim	1-11 (14) (17) 1-14	Limerick	Corrigan Park; Referee: Andy Larkin
2 July 2022; 16:00; Group Stage Round 5		Report		Corrigan Park; Referee: Andy Larkin

2 July 2022; 16:00; Group Stage Round 5	Down	1-11 (14) (13) 0-13	Offaly	Liatroim Fontenoys GAC; Referee: Eamon Cassidy
2 July 2022; 16:00; Group Stage Round 5		Report		Liatroim Fontenoys GAC; Referee: Eamon Cassidy

2 July 2022; 16:00; Group Stage Round 5	Galway	1-17 (20) (20) 2-14	Kilkenny	Kenny Park, Athenry; Referee: Philip McDonald
2 July 2022; 16:00; Group Stage Round 5		Report		Kenny Park, Athenry; Referee: Philip McDonald

== Knock-out stage ==
=== Quarter-finals ===
16 July 2022; 15:15; Quarter-final	Waterford	3-16 (25) (15) 1-12	Limerick	Semple Stadium; Referee: John Dermody
16 July 2022; 15:15; Quarter-final		Report		Semple Stadium; Referee: John Dermody

16 July 2022; 17:30; Quarter-final	Kilkenny	2-24 (30) (14) 1-11	Dublin	Semple Stadium; Referee: Justin Heffernan
16 July 2022; 17:30; Quarter-final		Report		Semple Stadium; Referee: Justin Heffernan

=== Semi-finals ===
23 July 2022; 15:15; Semi-final	Cork	0-15 (15) (10) 0-10	Waterford	Croke Park; Referee: Ray Kelly
23 July 2022; 15:15; Semi-final		Report		Croke Park; Referee: Ray Kelly

23 July 2022; 17:30; Semi-final	Galway	0-12 (12) (16) 1-13	Kilkenny	Croke Park; Referee: Andy Larkin
23 July 2022; 17:30; Semi-final		Report		Croke Park; Referee: Andy Larkin

=== Final ===
7 August 2022; 16:15; 2022 All-Ireland Final	Cork	1-12 (15) (16) 1-13	Kilkenny	Croke Park; Attendance: 23,426; Referee: Ray Kelly
7 August 2022; 16:15; 2022 All-Ireland Final		Report		Croke Park; Attendance: 23,426; Referee: Ray Kelly

== Relegation playoff ==
16 July 2022; 15:00 IST (UTC+01:00); Relegation playoff	Clare	6-10 (28) (16) 1-13	Offaly	St. Flannan's Park; Referee: Liz Dempsey
16 July 2022; 15:00 IST (UTC+01:00); Relegation playoff		Report		St. Flannan's Park; Referee: Liz Dempsey

Offaly are relegated to All-Ireland Intermediate Camogie Championship for 2023 season.
