= 1988 All-Ireland Senior Camogie Championship =

Camogie championship

All-Ireland Senior Camogie Championship 1988
Championship details
- Dates: June – 25 September 1988
- Teams: 8

All-Ireland champions
- Winners: Kilkenny (12th win)
- Captain: Angela Downey
- Manager: Tom Ryan

All-Ireland runners-up
- Runners-up: Cork
- Captain: Linda Mellerick

The 1988 All-Ireland Senior Camogie Championship. The championship was won by Kilkenny who defeated Cork by a six-point margin in the final. The match drew an attendance of 4,000. It was the first All-Ireland championship to be played over the extended time period of 60 minutes.

== Semi-finals ==
Kilkenny had a massive 21-point victory over Galway and Cork defeated Wexford by seven points in the All-Ireland semi-finals.

== Final ==
Ann Leahy scored after just 12 seconds in one of the quickest goals in a final of the All Ireland camogie championship;. Breda Holmes scored two goals and Clare Jones scored another as Kilkenny won the final. Cork were 2-2 to 1-5 behind at half time in the final. Cork’s jersey numbers proved hard to read. Pat Roche complained in the Irish Times:

Nobody on a losing side wishes to be easily identified but this was stretching it too far. Cork’s challenge may not have faded into obscurity like the numbers of their backs, but they were held at bay long enough for Kilkenny to record their fourth successive triumph.. Though Cork trailed by 3-3 to 1-5 at the interval, they challenged gamely to be in with a chance in the closing stages. That Cork’s chances were alive playing into the teeth of a strong downfield breeze in the closing stages was due to their persistence around the Kilkenny posts and the probings of Linda Mellerick.

=== Final stages ===
August 21
Semi-Final

Cork	2-9 – 2-2	Wexford

Ballinlough

August 28
Semi-Final

Kilkenny	3-19 – 1-4	Galway

Glenamaddy

September 25
Final

Kilkenny	4-11 – 3-8	Cork

Croke Park, Dublin

Kilkenny	Cork

KILKENNY:
GK	1	Marie Fitzpatrick (St Brigid’s Ballycallan)
FB	2	Biddy O'Sullivan (Shamrocks)
RWB	3	Helen Holmes (St Paul’s) (substituted off) 32)'
CB	4	Deirdre Malone (St Brigid’s Ballycallan)
LWB	5	Frances Rothwell (Mooncoin)
MF	6	Clare Jones (St Paul’s) (1-1)
MF	7	Ann Downey (St Paul’s) (0-4)
MF	8	Anna Whelan (Castlecomer)
RWF	9	Breda Cahill (St Brigid’s Ballycallan)
CF	10	Breda Holmes (St Paul’s) (2-1)
LWF	11	Angela Downey (St Paul’s) (Capt) (1-3)
FF	12	Jo Dunne (Carrickshock) (0-1)
Substitutes:
RWF		Marina Downey (St Paul’s) for Helen Holmes (substituted in) 32)'

Sub used: Marina Downey (0-1)

CORK:
GK	1	Marion McCarthy
FB	2	Mary Ring
RWB	3	Mary Spillane (1-0)
CB	4	Cathy Landers Harnedy
LWB	5	Anne O'Donovan
MF	6	Sandie Fitzgibbon (0-1)
MF	7	Clare Cronin
MF	8	Colette O'Mahony (0-1)
RWF	9	Anne Leahy (1-0)
CF	10	Linda Mellerick (0-3)
LWF	11	Irene O'Leary (substituted off) 45)'
FF	12	Mary Geaney (1-3)
Substitutes:
RWF		Liz Dunphy (0-2) for O'Leary (substituted in) 45)'

Preceded by All-Ireland Senior Camogie Championship 1987	All-Ireland Senior Camogie Championship; 1932 – present	Succeeded by All-Ireland Senior Camogie Championship 1989
