= 1964 All-Ireland Senior Camogie Championship =

All-Ireland Senior Camogie Championship 1964
Winners
- Champions: Dublin (24th title)
- Manager: Nell McCarthy
- Captain: Una O'Connor

Runners-up
- Runners-up: Antrim
- Captain: Sue Ward

The 1964 All Ireland Camogie Championship was won by Dublin, their eighth title in succession in a winning streak that would eventually extend to a ten in a row; Dublin beat Antrim in the final. The match was attended by more than 3,000 spectators, according to the report in the Irish Times.

== Semi-finals ==
Dublin beat Connacht champions Galway by 10–2 to nil at Parnell Park on a day when Galway were missing their goalkeeper. Antrim beat Munster champions Tipperary by 6–8 to 2–3 at Glenarriffe.

== Final ==
Three early goals from Judy Doyle finished the match as a contest and Dublin won easily by 7–4 to 3–1. Agnes Hourigan, president of the Camogie Association, wrote in the Irish Press:

Despite the scoreline the final must rank with the greatest and most brilliant camogie matches ever played. Three early goals by their flying full forward Judy Doyle in the first seven minutes of the game proved the really vital factor in Dublin’s victory. Those early goals, all the result of crafty team-work by the experienced Dublin attack, hung heavy on the minds of the Antrim forwards for the rest of the first half. Although with the fresh breeze behind them, they had by far the greater number of chances, they often shot too hurriedly and too wildly and Concepta Clark saved magnificently when they did shoot straight. The result was that, at the interval, Antrim had one point on the board and nine wides, while Dublin, thanks to that wonderful zig-zag solo run and flashing shot by captain Una O'Connor, and a rare piece of opportunism by Bríd Keenan, had stretched their goal total to five and their lead to fourteen points by the half-time whistle. Lesser teams than Antrim might well have accepted defeat at that stage, but the girls in saffron, having switched Lily Scullion to midfield and Maeve Gilroy to centre-forward, restarted as though the game had just begun.

=== Final stages ===
August
Semi-Final

Dublin	9-1 – 5-3	Galway

Parnell Park

Semi-Final

Antrim	3-2 – 1-0	Tipperary

Glenarriffe

1964-10-6
Final
14:00 BST

Dublin	7-4 – 3-1	Antrim
J Doyle 4–1, B Keenan 2–0, U O’Connor 1–3		E Smith 1–0, M Gilroy 1–0, MP Jameson 1–0, M McAtamney 0–1,

Croke Park, Dublin
Attendance: 3,100
Referee: M O'Kelly (Cork)

Dublin	Antrim

DUBLIN:
GK	1	Concepta Clark (Austin Stacks)
FB	2	Mary Ryan (Austin Stacks)
RWB	3	Rose O'Reilly (Na Piarsaigh)
CB	4	Allison Hussey (Celtic)
LWB	5	Kay Lyons (Eoghan Ruadh)
MF	6	Patricia Timmons (Naomh Aoife)
MF	7	Mary Sherlock Austin Stacks
MF	8	Orla Ní Síocháin Austin Stacks
RWF	9	Bríd Keenan (Austin Stacks) 2-0
CF	10	Kay Ryder (Austin Stacks)
LWF	11	Judy Doyle (CIE) 4-1
FF	12	Úna O'Connor (Celtic) (captain) 1-3

ANTRIM:
GK	1	Theresa Kearns (Dunloy)
FB	2	Moya Ford (Ahogill)
RWB	3	Chris Boyle (St Malachy’s)
CB	4	Sue Ward (Deirdre) (captain)
LWB	5	Mairéad Carabine St Theresa’s
MF	6	Betty Smyth (Gael Uladh) 1-0
MF	7	Maeve Gilroy (St Malachy’s) 1-0
MF	8	Mairead McAtamney (Portglenone) 0-1
RWF	9	Marion McFetteridge (St Malachy’s)
CF	10	Lily Scullion (Ahogill)
LWF	11	Kitty Finn (St Agnes’s)
FF	12	Mary Phil Jameson (St Theresa’s) 1-0

MATCH RULES

- 50 minutes
- Replay if scores level
- Maximum of 3 substitutions allowable only if player was injured

== See also ==
- All-Ireland Senior Hurling Championship
- Wikipedia List of Camogie players
- National Camogie League
- Camogie All Stars Awards
- Ashbourne Cup

Preceded by All-Ireland Senior Camogie Championship 1963	All-Ireland Senior Camogie Championship; 1932 – present	Succeeded by All-Ireland Senior Camogie Championship 1965
