= Mary Walsh (Dublin camogie player) =

Irish camogie player

Personal information
- Native name: Máire Bhreathnach (Irish)
- Born: Dublin, Ireland

Sport
- Sport: Camogie
Club*
Years	Club	Apps (scores)
	UCD	?
Inter-county**
Years	County	Apps (scores)
	Dublin	?
- * club appearances and scores correct as of (16:31, 30 June 2010 (UTC)). **Inter County team apps and scores correct as of (16:31, 30 June 2010 (UTC)).

Mary Walsh is a former camogie player, captain of the All Ireland Camogie Championship winning team in 1937. She won a further All Ireland senior medal in 1938.
