= Emmy Delaney =

Camogie player

Emmy Delany
Personal information
- Native name: Éama Ní Dhubhshláine (Irish)
- Born: Dublin, Ireland

Sport
- Sport: Camogie
- Position: centre field
Club*
Years	Club	Apps (scores)
	UCD	?
Inter-county**
Years	County	Apps (scores)
	Dublin	?
- * club appearances and scores correct as of (16:31, 30 June 2010 (UTC)). **Inter County team apps and scores correct as of (16:31, 30 June 2010 (UTC)).

Emily 'Emmie' Delany is a former camogie player. She played for University College Dublin (UCD). She was captain of the All Ireland Camogie Championship winning team in 1938 when she scored the fifth of Dublin's five goals in their 5–0 to 2–3 victory over Cork. Some sources reference her under the name "Emma Emmy Delaney" although her given name was Emily and her family name was Delany with no "e". She won a previous All Ireland senior medal in 1937.

== Ashbourne ==
She captained UCD to Ashbourne Cup success in 1938.

== Personal life ==
She married James Lynch on 19 April 1938. Together they had twelve children: Máire, Ray, Patricia, John, Denise, Patrick, Brendan, Francis, Eamonn, Joe, Imelda, & Dominic.
