= Madge Rainey =

Irish camogie player

Personal information
- Native name: Mairéad Ní Ráine (Irish)
- Born: Antrim, Northern Ireland

Sport
- Sport: Camogie
Club*
| Years | Club | Apps (scores) |
| | Dunloy | ? |
Inter-county**
| Years | County | Apps (scores) |
| | Antrim | ? |
- * club appearances and scores correct as of (16:31, 30 June 2010 (UTC)). **Inter County team apps and scores correct as of (16:31, 30 June 2010 (UTC)).

Margaret Rainey is a former camogie player, captain of the All Ireland Camogie Championship winning team in 1956. She played in the All Ireland senior final of 1951.

== Career ==
She gave an accomplished in All Ireland semi-final and final in 1951 and was a goalscorer on the Antrim team that shocked Dublin in the 1956 All Ireland semi-final. She played again on the Antrim team that narrowly won the 1957 semi-final against Mayo in Castlebar but was not on the team defeated in the 1957 final.
