= Nancy Murray =

16th President of the Camogie Association

Nancy Murray, Neans Uí Mhuirí

16th President of the Camogie Association
- In office 1973–1976
- Succeeded by: Úna Uí Phuirséil

Personal details
- Died: May 16, 2004

Anne "Nancy" Mulligan-Murray (Neans Uí Mhuirí) from Antrim was the 16th president of the Camogie Association.

== Playing career ==
From Deirdre club in Belfast, she won three All Ireland medals at full-back in 1945, 1946 and 1947 as Nancy Mulligan, playing her last match for the county in the All Ireland semi-final of 1970, and also played in the All Ireland Club finals of 1964 and 1965. She trained Antrim to victory in another All Ireland.

== Presidency ==
During her presidency closer co-operation with the GAA was belatedly initiated after a meeting in January 1974. In that year the All Ireland minor county and All Ireland Junior Colleges Championships were inaugurated, and Camogie was included for the first time in the under-14 festival Féile na nGael.

== Nancy Murray Cup ==
In 2007 the camogie trophy for the annual inter-county All Ireland Championship for counties graded Junior A was named in her honour.
