= Kathleen Cody (camogie) =

Irish camogie player (born 1925)

Personal information
- Native name: Caitlín Níc Oda (Irish)
- Born: 1925 Dublin, Ireland

Sport
- Sport: Camogie
- Position: forward, centre-field
Clubs*
Years	Club	Apps (scores)
	Optimists Celtic and CIÉ	?
Inter-county**
Years	County	Apps (scores)
1941-51	Dublin	?
Inter-county titles
- All-Irelands: 7
- * club appearances and scores correct as of (16:31, 30 June 2010 (UTC)). **Inter County team apps and scores correct as of (16:31, 30 June 2010 (UTC)).

Kathleen Cody (born 1925) is an Irish former camogie player, one of the leading players of her generation and one of the game’s most accomplished goalscorers.

== Family background and career ==
The daughter of a Kilkenny father and Tipperary mother, she was a cousin of the Kilkenny All Ireland hurling medalist Jimmy Langton. She was a promising singer on the concert circuit in 1940s Dublin.

== Scoring achievements ==
Cody scored 6-7 of Dublin’s 8-7 total in the 1949 All Ireland final, won by a CIÉ club team who represented Dublin en masse, as the county board was in dispute with the Camogie Association. She won seven All Ireland senior medals in all.

== Career ==
Cody played her first senior match for Dublin on 3 July 1938, at the age of 13, an exhibition match on the Isle of Man. She was described as the "star player" in the exhibition game.

Cody played schools camogie for Loreto Convent Crumlin and Mercy Convent Goldenbridge. She affiliated to three Dublin clubs during her career, winning three championships in two spells with Great Southern Railway club, in 1938-42 and 1945-49 with CIÉ, as they became known and another championship with the Dublin Optimists Camogie Club with whom she played in 1942-45. Eventually she captained the Dublin Celtic Camogie Club to the Dublin championship in 1950, having scored 4-4 in her first match for them against UCD in November 1949.

The report of the 1941 All Ireland final, her first, described her as "the most spectacular player on the field" despite the fact Dublin were beaten. She starred again in the 1942 drawn final, and having missed the 1943 her "all round brilliance" was praised in the report of the 1944 final. She did not play in 1945-6 because of a dispute which tore apart the Camogie Association but when her club broke with Dublin county board she played again in the 1947 final at the end of which she saw her would-be equaliser, which appeared to cross the line, disallowed in the fading light.

Cody scored three of Dublin’s eleven goals in the 1948 All Ireland final against Down and was the star again at centre field in 1950 and remained the play-maker as she won her sixth and seventh All Ireland medals in 1951 and 1952, at which stage her club-mate Sophie Brack had taken over goal scoring duties.

== Administration ==
While still a player she was elected chair of Dublin camogie board.

== Retirement ==
Having won seven All Ireland medals and eleven Leinster championship medals and at the age of just 24, Kathleen Cody announced she was retiring and joining the Holy Faith order convent in Glasnevin in January 1952. She later went to live in Worthing, Sussex, England, and was awarded a medal for heroism when she helped rescue five people from a fire in a flat in April 1975.
