= Doreen Rogers =

Camogie player

Personal information
- Native name: Dóirín Nic Ruairí (Irish)
- Born: Dublin, Ireland

Sport
- Sport: Camogie
Club*
Years	Club	Apps (scores)
	Austin Stacks	?
Inter-county**
Years	County	Apps (scores)
	Dublin	?
- * club appearances and scores correct as of (16:31, 30 June 2010 (UTC)). **Inter County team apps and scores correct as of (16:31, 30 June 2010 (UTC)).

Doreen Rogers is a former camogie player, captain of the All Ireland Camogie Championship winning team in 1944 and 1949.

== Career ==
A prolific goalscorer throughout her career, she won further All Ireland senior medals in 1942 when she scored two of Dublin's four goals in the final and 1943 when she scored three of Dublin's eight goals, against Cork in each case.

== Club exploits ==
She scored a goal for Austin Stacks in their breakthrough Dublin Championship victory over Optimists by 3-4 to 0–1 in 1945, and four goals for Austin Stacks when they beat Coláiste San Dominic by 7-0 to 6–1 in 1948. Her daughter also Doreen scored the second of Naomh Aoife's four goals in their 4-1 to 0-1 championship final breakthrough victory over Celtic in 1966.
