= Sophie Brack =

Personal information
- Native name: Sophie Ní Bhreac (Irish)
- Born: Dublin, Ireland
- Died: 1996

Sport
- Sport: Camogie
- Position: centre-half-forward
Club
- Years: Club
- 1948-1956: CIE
Inter-county
- Years: County
- 1948-1956: Dublin
Inter-county titles
- All-Irelands: 8
- All Stars: 2004 Team of Century

Sophie Brack is a former camogie player who was selected on the camogie team of the century in 2004, and winner of All Ireland medals in 1948, 1949, 1950, 1951, 1952, 1953, 1954 and 1955.

== Background and career ==
She won eight All Ireland medals with Dublin. When the CIE club represented Dublin because of an affiliation dispute in 1948, Sophie captained the team to win the O'Duffy Cup, scoring two goals in the first ten minutes and three goals overall in the final. She went on to captain Dublin winning teams on five other occasions, a record unlikely ever to be equalled. A prolific goalscorer, she also scored three goals in the 1950 "home" final, four goals in the 1951 final, and three goals in each of the 1954 and 1955 finals.

== Citation ==
In 2004, she was named to the Camogie Team of the Century. The official selection citation described her as follows:

the pioneer of full forwards, opening up the play for others and moving into space with great intelligence. Playing at the edge of the square from where she varied her tactics making life difficult for backs and goalkeepers alike. Possessing lightning speed and great positional sense she was a prolific scorer. A legend among her peers she gave great service to the game of Camogie as a player of exceptional ability and as an able administrator. Her untimely death in 1996 robbed the association of an exceptional contributor.
