= Aoife Donohue =

Camogie player for Mullagh and county Galway

Personal information
- Occupation: Teacher

Sport
- Sport: Camogie
- Position: Midfield/Forward
Club
- Years: Club
- Mullagh GAA
Club titles
- Galway titles: 1
College
- Years: College
- University of Galway
Inter-county
- Years: County
- 2013-current: Galway
Inter-county titles
- All-Irelands: 4
- NHL: 5
- All Stars: 6

Aoife Donohue is a camogie player from Galway. She plays as a midfield or forward for her club Mullagh and the Galway county team and works as a Secondary School teacher. She was Camogie Player of the Year in 2021 and 2025.

== Carreer ==
Aoife Donohue started playing camogie she was spotted by the Mullagh U14 manager playing soccer at school. She soon won a Minor All-Ireland with Galway.

In 2013 she won the Galway Senior League and both the All-Ireland Intermediate and Senior Championship.

She could defend the Galway League title in 2014 and won her so far only Galway Senior Camogie Championship.

In 2015 she won her first National Camogie League title with Galway and in 2016 she got her first Camogie All Stars Award.

Galway won both the National League and the All-Ireland Championship in 2019 and Aoife got her third All Stars award.

In 2021 she won her third All-Ireland Championship and was named Camogie Player of the Year.

She could win to more National Camogie Leagues in 2022 and 2023.

Galway won the All-Ireland Senior Camogie Championship again in 2025 and Aoife received her sixth All Stars award and second Player of the Year award.

In 2026 she won he fifth National Camogie League title.

== Titles ==
All-Ireland Senior Camogie Championship: 4

- 2013, 2019, 2021, 2025

National Camogie League: 5

- 2015, 2019, 2022, 2023, 2026

All-Ireland Intermediate Camogie Championship: 1

- 2013

Galway Senior Camogie Championship: 1

- 2014

Galway Senior Camogie League: 4

- 2013, 2014, 2015 & 2018

Purcell Cup: 1

- 2018

All-Ireland Minor Camogie Championship: 1

- 2010

== Awards ==
Player of the Year: 2

- 2021, 2025

Camogie All Stars Awards: 6

- 2016, 2017, 2019, 2021, 2024, 2025
