= Paddy Mullally =

Kilkenny hurler

Personal information
- Native name: Pádraig Ó Maolalaidh (Irish)
- Born: 29 April 1976 (age 50) Glenmore, County Kilkenny, Ireland
- Occupation: Carpenter
- Height: 5 ft 10 in (178 cm)

Sport
- Sport: Hurling
- Position: Midfield
Club
- Years: Club
- Glenmore
Club titles
	Football	Hurling
Kilkenny titles	1	2
Leinster titles	0	1
College
- Years: College
- Waterford RTC
College titles
- Fitzgibbon titles: 1
Inter-county
- Years: County
- 1995–2004: Kilkenny
Inter-county titles
- Leinster titles: 4
- All-Irelands: 2
- NHL: 1
- All Stars: 0

Patrick Joseph Mullally (born 29 April 1976) is an Irish hurling coach and former player. At club level, he played with Glenmore and at inter-county level with the Kilkenny senior hurling team.

== Playing career ==
Born and raised in Glenmore, County Kilkenny, Mullally played hurling and Gaelic football at all levels as a student at Good Counsel College in New Ross. He was part of the school's senior team that won the All-Ireland Colleges SBFC title after a defeat of St Colman's College in 1993. Mullally later attended Waterford Regional Technical College and won a Fitzgibbon Cup medal after a 1–19 to 1–08 win over University of Limerick.

At club level, Mullally first played for Glenmore as a dual player at juvenile and underage levels before progressing to adult level. He was a Leinster Club SHC medal winner in 1995, having earlier claimed his first Kilkenny SHC medal. Mullally was part of Glenmore's Kilkenny SFC title-winning team in 1998, before adding a second SHC medal to his collection the following year. He ended his career by winning a second SFC medal after a 2–07 to 0–10 win over Muckalee in 2009.

Meally first appeared on the inter-county scene with Kilkenny as part of the minor team that won the Leinster MHC title in 1994. He progressed to the under-21 team and was a Leinster U21HC medallist before losing to Tipperary in the 1995 All-Ireland U20HC final.

As well as being part of the under-21 team, Mullally began his association with the senior team in 1995. He spent a number of years as a dual player at senior level and served as captain of the Kilkenny senior football team. Mullally joined the senior hurling team on a full-time basis in 1999 and won the first of four Leinster SHC medals that year. He was an unused substitute when Kilkenny beat Offaly by 5–15 to 1–14 in the 2000 All-Ireland SHC final. Mullally added a National Hurling League title to his collection in 2002, before collecting an All-Ireland SHC medal on the field of play after a three-point defeat of Cork in the 2003 All-Ireland SHC final.

Mullally and his brother Richie were unused substitutes for the 2004 All-Ireland SHC final defeat by Cork. Their father died on the day before the final. Mullally withdrew from the panel in January 2005.

== Management career ==
Mullally first became involved in team management and coaching at club level with Glenmore when he coached the club's under-21 team. He later served as a selector with the club's senior team when they won the All-Ireland Club JHC title in 2016. Mullally was involved in camogie coaching with the Waterford Institute of Technology, before serving as a selector with the Kilkenny senior camogie team when they won the All-Ireland SCC title in 2016. He took over as manager of the Mullinavat senior hurling team in 2018, before spending two years as a coach to the Carlow senior hurling team under the management of his brother Tom.

== Honours ==
=== Player ===
Good Counsel College

- All-Ireland Colleges Senior B Football Championship: 1993
- Leinster Colleges Senior B Football Championship: 1993

Waterford RTC

- Fitzgibbon Cup: 1994

Glenmore

- Leinster Senior Club Hurling Championship: 1995
- Kilkenny Senior Hurling Championship: 1995, 1999
- Kilkenny Senior Football Championship: 1998, 2009

Kilkenny

- All-Ireland Senior Hurling Championship: 2000, 2003
- Leinster Senior Hurling Championship: 1999, 2000, 2001, 2003
- National Hurling League: 2003
- Leinster Under-21 Hurling Championship: 1995
- Leinster Minor Hurling Championship: 1994

=== Management ===
Glenmore

- All-Ireland Junior Club Hurling Championship: 2016
- Leinster Junior Club Hurling Championship: 2016
- Kilkenny Junior Hurling Championship: 2015

Kilkenny

- All-Ireland Senior Camogie Championship: 2016
- National Camogie League: 2016, 2017, 2018
