= 1991 National Camogie League =

Camogie tournament

National Camogie League 1991
Winners
- Champions: Cork (3rd title)
- Captain: Therése O'Callaghan

Runners-up
- Runners-up: Kilkenny

The 1991 National Camogie League is a competition in the women's team field sport of camogie was won by Cork, who defeated Kilkenny in the final, played at Ballinough.

== Arrangements ==
Cork opened their National League campaign in march with a resounding win over dual champions Kilkenny. Kilkenny were short many regulars. The Galway travelled to Ballincollig and defeated Cork, There was a three way tie at the top of Division One between Kilkenny, Galway and Cork. When Galway and Cork drew, Kilkenny reached the semi-finals with Galway and Cork playing off for the other place.

== The Final ==
Kilkenny played with the wind in the first half and scored a goal and a point after five and a half minutes, only to trail 2-7 to 1-4 at half-time. Although Kilkenny scored two quick points at the start of the second half they never looked like regaining the lead. Kilkenny had to wait until the last minute to get their second goal, from Angela Downey.

== Division 2 ==
The Junior National League, known since 2006 as Division Two, was won by Limerick who defeated Roscommon in the final.

=== Final stages ===
June 30
Final

Cork	2-13 – 2-8	Kilkenny

Ballinough

Cork	Kilkenny

Cork:
GK	1	Marian McCarthy (Éire Óg)
FB	2	Liz Dunphy (Sarsfields)
RWB	3	Paula Coggins (Inniscarra)
CB	4	Breda Kenny
LWB	5	Ine O'Keeffe (Inniscarra) 1-1
MF	6	Colette O'Mahony (St Finbarr's) 0-7
MF	7	Therese O'Callaghan (Glen Rovers) (Capt) 0-1
MF	8	Sandie Fitzgibbon (Glen Rovers)
RWF	9	Linda Mellerick (Glen Rovers)
CF	10	Ger McCarthy (Glen Rovers) 0-1
LWF	11	Liz O'Neill (Bishopstown)1-0
FF	12	Irne O'Leary 9-3

Kilkenny:
GK	1	Marie Fitzpatrick (St Brigid’s Ballycallan)
FB	2	Biddy O'Sullivan (Shamrocks)
RWB	3	Una Murphy (Tullogher)
CB	4	Deidre Maloney (St Brigid’s Ballycallan)
LWB	5	Frances Rothwell (Mooncoin)
MF	6	Marina Downey (Lisdowney)
MF	7	Ann Downey (Lisdowney)
MF	8	Gillian Dillon (St Lachtain's) 0-1
RWF	9	Sinéad Millea (St Brigid’s Ballycallan)
CF	10	Bridget Mullally (Glenmore) 1-3
LWF	11	Angela Downey (Lisdowney) (Capt) 1-3
FF	12	Breda Holmes (Lisdowney)

Preceded by National Camogie League 1990	National Camogie League; 1977 – present	Succeeded by National Camogie League 1992
