= 1995 National Camogie League =

Camogie tournament

National Camogie League 1995
Winners
- Champions: Cork (5th title)
- Captain: Denise Cronin

Runners-up
- Runners-up: Armagh

The 1995 National Camogie League is a competition in the women's team field sport of camogie was won by Cork, who defeated Armagh in the final, played at St Finbarr's.

== Arrangements ==
Armagh, who won the All-Ireland Junior title in 1993 and the Intermediate title in 1994, were competing for the first time and created the first of several major shocks when they defeated understrength title holders Galway by 3-8 to 0-13 at Middleton, with the help of a first half goals from Brenie McBride, a kicked goal from Patricia McEvoy as the game entered the last quarter and a late free from Ursula McGiven. Galway led by 0-9 to 1-4 at half time and Sharn Glynn was their only player to score, scoring all of but two of Galway’s points. Armagh then went on to defeat Wexford in the semi-final.

== The Final ==
Two goals each from Collette O'Mahoney and Lyn Delea gave Cork victory against surprise finalists Armagh. Cork led 3-7 to 0-2 at half time. Armagh had three goals in the second half but Cork remained in control.

== Division 2 ==
The Junior National League, known since 2006 as Division Two, was won by Galway intermediates who defeated Down in the final.

=== Final stages ===
May 14
Semi-Final

Cork	3-9 – 1-10	Kilkenny
Lyn Delea 2-0, Stephanie Delea 1-1, Linda Mellerick 0-3, Therese O'Callaghan 0-2, Iren O'Keeffe 0-2, Collette O'Mahoney 0-1		Angela Downey 1-2, Gillian Dillon 0-3, Ann Downey 901, Sinéad Millea 0-1, Marina Downey 0-1.

Páirc Uí Rinn

May 14
Semi-Final

Armagh	2-11 – 2-7	Wexford
Olivia McGeown 1-1, Brenie McBride 1-1, Ursula McGiven 0-6, Patricia McEvoy 0-2, D Connolly 0-1.		A Gordon 1-2, Michelle O'Leary 1-0, Siobhan Dunne 0-4, Finola Dunne 0-1

Portmore

June 21
Final

Cork	5-16 – 3-4	Armagh
Collette O'Mahoney 2-5, Lyn Delea 2-1, Therése O'Callaghan 1-1, Iren O'Keeffe 0-3, Stephanie Delea 0-3, Collette O'Mahoney 0-3.		Patricia McEvoy 1-2, Collette Bryne 1-0, Brenie McBride 1-0, Ursula McGiven 0-2

St Finbarr's

Cork	Armagh

Cork:
GK	1	Cathleen Costine (Killeagh)
FB	2	Eithne Duggan (Bishopstown)
RWB	3	Paula Coggins (Inniscarra)
CB	4	Sandie Fitzgibbon (Glen Rovers)
LWB	5	Mag Finn (Fr O'Neill's)
MF	6	Linda Mellerick (Glen Rovers)
MF	7	Vivienne Harris (Bishopstown) 0-3
MF	8	Stephanie Delea (Glen Rovers) 0-3
RWF	9	Collette O'Mahoney (St Finbarr's) 2-5
CF	10	Therése O'Callaghan (Glen Rovers) 1-1
LWF	11	Iren O'Keeffe (Inniscarra) 0-3
FF	12	Lyn Delea (Glen Rovers) 2-1

Armagh:
GK	1	Margaret McKee
FB	2	Margaret Moriarty
RWB	3	Geraldine Haughey
CB	4	Celine McGreery
LWB	5	S Smith
MF	6	Anne French
MF	7	Mary Black
MF	8	Olivia McGeown
RWF	9	Brenie McBride 1-0
CF	10	Collette Bryne 1-0
LWF	11	Ursula McGiven 0-2
FF	12	Patricia McEvoy 1-2

Preceded by National Camogie League 1994	National Camogie League; 1977 – present	Succeeded by National Camogie League 1996
