= 1997 National Camogie League =

Camogie tournament

National Camogie League 1997
Winners
- Champions: Cork (7th title)
- Captain: Linda Mellerick

Runners-up
- Runners-up: Kilkenny

The 1997 National Camogie League is a competition in the women's team field sport of camogie was won by Cork, who defeated Kilkenny in the final, played at Páirc Uí Rinn.

== Arrangements ==
Kilkenny overpowered Kilkenny 4–17 to 3–10 in the semi-final but had t play the final without Sinéad Millea who had gone to the USA. Cork defeated Galway 0–17 to 1–10 in the semi-final.

== The Final ==
Cork took command of the final almost immediately and ran out 15-point winners.

== Division 2 ==
The Junior National League, known since 2006 as Division Two, was won by Antrim who defeated Down in an all-Ulster final.

=== Final stages ===
June 8
Final

Cork	4-12 – 0-9	Kilkenny

Páirc Uí Rinn

Cork	Kilkenny

Cork:
GK	1	Cora Keohane (Barryroe)
FB	2	Eithne Duggan (Bishopstown)
RWB	3	Denise Cronin (Glen Rovers)
CB	4	Sandie Fitzgibbon (Glen Rovers)
LWB	5	Mag Finn (Fr O'Neill's)
MF	6	Linda Mellerick (Glen Rovers)
MF	7	Vivienne Harris (Bishopstown) (0-4)
MF	8	Mary O'Connor (Killeagh)
RWF	9	Sinéad O'Callaghan (Ballinhassig)
CF	10	Fiona O'Driscoll (Fr O'Neill's)
LWF	11	Ine O'Keeffe (2-0) (Inniscarra)
FF	12	Lyn Delea (Glen Rovers)

Kilkenny:
GK	1	Miriam Holland (Lisdowney)
FB	2	Ann Downey (Lisdowney)
RWB	3	Margaret Hickey (St Lachtain's)
CB	4	Mairéad Costelloe (St Lachtain's)
LWB	5	Kelly Long (St Lachtain's)
MF	6	Gillian Maher (St Lachtain's)
MF	7	Marina Downey(Lisdowney)
MF	8	Caitríona Carey (St Lachtain's)
RWF	9	Margaret Comerford (St Brigid's Ballycallan)
CF	10	Brigid Mullally (Glenmore)
LWF	11	Lizzie Lyng (Rower-Inistioge)
FF	12	Catherine Dunne (Carrickshock)

Preceded by National Camogie League 1996	National Camogie League; 1977 – present	Succeeded by National Camogie League 1998
