= 1989 National Camogie League =

Camogie tournament

National Camogie League 1989
Winners
- Champions: Kilkenny (7th title)
- Captain: Ann Downey

Runners-up
- Runners-up: Cork

The 1989 National Camogie League is a competition in the women's team field sport of camogie was won by Kilkenny, who defeated Cork in the final, played at Nowlan Park. It was the first National League to be played under rules fixing the duration of matches at 60 minutes.

== Arrangements ==
Kilkenny dropped three points early in the league campaign and an understrength team, minus Angela Downey lost to Cork by seven points. Kilkenny won their way back into contention when Dublin faltered and took their semi-final place at Dublin's expense. Both counties had big wins in the semi-finals, Kilkenny scored 6-8 against Galway in the semi-final and a weak Clare team failed to test Cork.

== The Final ==
Angela Downey and Breda Holmes scored two goals each in the final for Kilkenny in the final.

== Division 2 ==
The Junior National League, known since 2006 as Division Two, was won by Kildare who defeated Armagh in the final on July 23.

=== Final stages ===
June 18
Final

Kilkenny	6-7 – 1-11	Cork

Nowlan Park

Kilkenny	Cork

Kilkenny:
GK	1	Marie Fitzpatrick (St Brigid’s Ballycallan)
FB	2	Biddy O'Sullivan (Shamrocks)
RWB	3	Frances Rothwell (Mooncoin)
CB	4	Clare Jones (St Paul’s)
LWB	5	Helen Holmes (St Paul’s)
MF	6	Breda Cahill (St Brigid’s Ballycallan) 1-2
MF	7	Ann Downey (St Paul’s) (Capt)
MF	8	Bridie McGarry (St Paul’s) 0-1
RWF	9	Anne Whelan (Lisdowney)
CF	10	Breda Holmes (St Paul’s) 2-0
LWF	11	Angela Downey (St Paul’s) 2-4
FF	12	Marina Downey (Lisdowney). 0-3

Cork:
GK	1	Marian McCarthy (Éire Óg)
FB	2	Liz Dunphy (Sarsfields) 0-1
RWB	3	Liz O'Neill (Bishopstown)
CB	4	Cathy Harnedy (Killeagh)
LWB	5	Mag Finn (Fr O'Neill’s)
MF	6	Clare Cronin (St Finbarr's)
MF	7	Therese O'Callaghan (Glen Rovers) (substituted off) 55)'
MF	8	Sandie Fitzgibbon (Glen Rovers)
RWF	9	Linda Mellerick (Glen Rovers) 0-1
CF	10	Betty Joyce (Killeagh) (Capt) 0-7
LWF	11	Ger McCarthy (Glen Rovers)
FF	12	Collette O'Mahoney (St Finbarr's) 1-2

Preceded by National Camogie League 1988	National Camogie League; 1977 – present	Succeeded by National Camogie League 1990
