= 1996 National Camogie League =

Camogie tournament

National Camogie League 1996
Winners
- Champions: Cork (6th title)
- Captain: Therése O'Callaghan

Runners-up
- Runners-up: Galway

The 1996 National Camogie League is a competition in the women's team field sport of camogie was won by Cork, who defeated Galway in the final, played at Páirc Uí Rinn.

== Arrangements ==
Cork beat Kilkenny 4-9 to 2-8 and the Galway beat Kilkenny 6-13 to 5-12 in the semi-final, a first ever victory by Galway over Kilkenny at senior level. Martina Harkins scored the match-clinching goal in the last two minutes.

== The Final ==
Galway managed to core the first two points in the final but Cork replied with 1-4 in a five-minute period, the goal coming from Ine O'Keeffe and led 2-11 to 1-4 at half-time. Galway’s last score of the game came ten minutes into the second half. Galway reversed the result in the All-Ireland final three months later.

== Division 2 ==
The Junior National League, known since 2006 as Division Two, was won by Limerick who defeated Down in the final.

=== Final stages ===
June 2
Final

Cork	3-16 – 1-7	Galway

Páirc Uí Rinn

Cork	Galway

Cork:
GK	1	Cathleen Costine (Killeagh)
FB	2	Eithne Duggan (Bishopstown)
RWB	3	Paula Coggins (Inniscarra)
CB	4	Sandie Fitzgibbon (Glen Rovers)
LWB	5	Mag Finn (Fr O'Neill’s)
MF	6	Therése O'Callaghan (Glen Rovers) (Capt)
MF	7	Vivienne Harris (Bishopstown)
MF	8	Linda Mellerick (Glen Rovers) (0-1)
RWF	9	Denise Cronin (Glen Rovers)
CF	10	Mary O'Connor (Killeagh)
LWF	11	Fiona O'Driscoll (Fr O'Neill’s)
FF	12	Lyn Delea (Glen Rovers)

Galway:
GK	1	Louise Curry (Pearses)
FB	2	Olivia Costello (Sarsfields)
RWB	3	Brigid Kilgannon
CB	4	Rita Coen
LWB	5	Caitríona Finnegan
MF	6	Cora Curley
MF	7	Martina Harkins (Pearses)
MF	8	Imelda Hobbins (Mullagh)
RWF	9	Denise Gilligan (Craughwell)
CF	10	Veronica Curtin (Kinvara)
LWF	11	Sharon Glynn (Pearses)
FF	12	Carmel Hannon (Pearses)
Substitutes:
CB		Anna Broderick (Davitts) for Curley (substituted in) 31'
MF		Emer Hardiman for Martine Harkin (substituted in) 34'

Preceded by National Camogie League 1995	National Camogie League; 1977 – present	Succeeded by National Camogie League 1997
