= 1977–78 National Camogie League =

Camogie tournament

National Camogie League 1977
Winners
- Champions: Wexford (1st title)

Runners-up
- Runners-up: Cork

The 1977 National Camogie League is a competition in the women's team field sport of camogie was won by Wexford, who defeated Cork in the final, played at Castleboro.

== Arrangements ==
Cork, who did not compete in 1976-77, won the western zone with full points, defeating holders Tipperary, Clare, Galway and Limerick. Wexford lost in their first outing to Kilkenny, who in turn lost to Dublin, leaving all three counties on two points. In the play-offs Wexford then beat Kilkenny and Dublin but by the time these matches had been played, the final, fixed for mid-November had to be put forward to March. Wexford had beaten Cork by 3-8 to 1-3 in the open draw championship the previous July.

== The Final ==
Bridget Doyle scored two goals as Wexford won the final by seven points. Agnes Hourigan wrote in the Irish Press:

Last year’s runners-up became champions when they defeated a youthful and dashing Cork combination. Cork took some time to settle down. They were forced to make one change in their team before the start, Hannah Cortter replacing Margaret McCarthy. They had first class defenders in Marie Mackey and Betty Joyce, Pat Riordan and Pat Moloney were staunch worker sin centre field and Margarete O'Leary was a sharp-shooting quarter. Deirdre Cousins, Dorothy and Elsie Walsh and Kit Codd did well for the winners.

=== Final stages ===
March 5, 1978
Final

Wexford	6-4 – 1-2	Cork
Brigit Doyle 2-1; Margaret Lacy, D Walsh, E Walsh K Codd 0-1 each.		M O'Leary 0-2; P Maloney 0-2.

Clonroche, Wexford
Attendance: 2,000
Referee: Helena O'Neill (Kilkenny)

Wexford	Cork

Wexford:
GK	1	Kathleen Tonk (Buffers Alley)
FB	2	Jane Murphy (Buffers Alley)
RWB	3	Deidre Cousins (Buffers Alley)
CB	4	Margaret Lacy (Buffers Alley)
LWB	5	Mairead Darcy (St Mary’s Enniscorthy)
MF	6	Dorothy Walshe (Buffers Alley)
MF	7	Brigit Doyle (Buffers Alley)
MF	8	Margaret Murphy (Cloughbawn/Adamstown)
RWF	9	Kit Codd (Cloughbawn-Adamstown)
CF	10	Elsa Walsh (Buffers Alley)
LWF	11	Ellen Kehoe (Cloughbawn/Adamstown)
FF	12	Brigit Doyle (Cloughbawn/Adamstown)

Cork:
GK	1	M O'Sullivan
FB	2	Marie Costine (Cloyne)
RWB	3	Betty Joyce
CB	4	Marie Mackey (Glen Rovers)
LWB	5	Helen Cotter
MF	6	Patricia O'Riordan (Ballinlough)
MF	7	Claire Cronin (Balinlough)
MF	8	Pat Moloney (Killeagh)
RWF	9	Mary O'Leary (Watergrasshill)
CF	10	Mary Geaney (Eire Og)
LWF	11	Marion Sweeney (Killeagh)
FF	12	Nancy O'Driscoll (Éire Óg)

Preceded by National Camogie League 1976	National Camogie League; 1977 – present	Succeeded by National Camogie League 1978
