= 1987 National Camogie League =

Camogie tournament

National Camogie League 1987
Winners
- Champions: Kilkenny (5th title)
- Captain: Bridie McGarry

Runners-up
- Runners-up: Dublin

The 1987 National Camogie League is a competition in the women's team field sport of camogie was won by Kilkenny, who defeated Dublin in the final, played at Nowlan Park.

== Arrangements ==
Kilkenny had already defeated Dublin in the group stages of the League, winning an exciting section one final at Silverpark by 2–4 to 1–6 on May 3. The sides were level 2–0 to 1–3 at half time and Dublin gained a three-point lead five minutes into the second half before Kilkenny equalised and Angela Downey added the winning point. Since then Dublin were depleted. Ann Holden had emigrated, midfielder Mary Mernagh was carrying a leg injury, Breda Kenny, Toni O'Byrne and Marie Connell were in the US, a side effect of the deepest point in Ireland's 1980s recession. Dublin had defeated Clare in the semi-final. In the weekend before the League final Kilkenny lost to Cork and Wexford in an experimental rules 15-a-side tournament. Kilkenny defeated Galway and Dublin defeated Clare by 4–11 to 2–5 in the semi-finals.

== The Final ==
Kilkenny won the final with a fine second half performance. Dublin had most of the play in the first half and could not find the net, Kilkenny led by 1–4 to 0–3 at half time and never looked back. Ann Downey scored 1–4, and Angela Downey 1–2. The Irish Independent noted: "It was a disappointing game which never rose to great heights."

== Division 2 ==
The Junior National League, known since 2006 as Division Two, was won by Dublin's second team who defeated Kildare in the final at Clane on August 2. Kildare led 1–5 to 1–2 at half-time, but after Geraldine Dunne equalised for Dublin with a goal early in the second half, Kildare were then hit with two goals and Dublin won by 6–4 by 1–7. Dublin scored nine goals in the semi-final against Clare.

=== Final stages ===
June 7
Final

Kilkenny	4-8 – 1-6	Dublin

Nowlan Park

Kilkenny	Dublin

Kilkenny:
GK	1	Marie Fitzpatrick (St Brigid's Ballycallan)
FB	2	Rita Weymes
RWB	3	Deirdre Malone (St Brigid's Ballycallan)
CB	4	Bridie McGarry (St Paul's) (Capt)
LWB	5	Biddy O'Sullivan (Shamrocks)
MF	6	Clare Jones (St Paul's)
MF	7	Ann Downey (St Paul's) 1–4
MF	8	Anna Whelan (Lisdowney)
RWF	9	Jo Dunne (Carrickshock) 0–1
CF	10	Breda Holmes (St Paul's) 0–1
LWF	11	Angela Downey (St Paul's) 1–2
FF	12	Liz Neary (St Paul's)

Dublin:
GK	1	Yvonne Redmond (Cúchulainn Crumlin)
FB	2	Marion Conroy (Austin Stacks)
RWB	3	Germaine Noonan (UCD)
CB	4	Breda Kenny (UCD)
LWB	5	Barbara Redmond 1–0
MF	6	Una Crowley (Celtic) (Capt)
MF	7	Mary Mernagh (Cuala Naomh Mhuire)
MF	8	Cathy Walsh (Cúchulainn Crumlin)
RWF	9	Joan Gormley (UCD)
CF	10	Edel Murphy (UCD) 0–4
LWF	11	Carmel O'Byrne (Celtic)
FF	12	Louise Lynch 0–1

Preceded by National Camogie League 1986	National Camogie League; 1977 – present	Succeeded by National Camogie League 1988
