= 2021 National Camogie League =

Gaelic sports competition

League details
- Dates: 15 May – 20 June 2021
- Teams: 39

League champions
- Winners: Kilkenny (15th win)
- Captain: Meighan Farrell
- Manager: Brian Dowling

League runners-up
- Runners-up: Galway
- Captain: Sarah Dervan
- Manager: Cathal Murray

Other division winners
- Division 2: Down
- Division 3: Wexford
- Division 4: Cavan

The 2021 National Camogie League, known for sponsorship reasons as the Littlewoods Ireland Camogie Leagues, took place in Ireland in summer 2021. It was won by Kilkenny.

== Format ==
=== League structure ===
The 2021 National Camogie League consists of four divisions:

- 9 in Division 1, divided into three groups of 3 teams
- 14 in Division 2, divided into four groups of 3 or 4 teams
- 8 in Division 3, divided into two groups of 4 teams
- 8 in Division 4, divided into two groups of 4 teams

Each team plays every other team in its group once. 3 points are awarded for a win and 1 for a draw.

If two teams are level on points, the tie-break is:

- winners of the head-to-head game are ranked ahead
- if the head-to-head match was a draw, ranking is determined by the points difference (i.e. total scored minus total conceded in all games)
- if the points difference is equal, ranking is determined by the total scored

If three or more teams are level on league points, rankings are determined solely by points difference.

=== Finals ===
In Division 1, two group winners (chosen randomly) advance to the semi-finals, while one group winner and the three group runners-up play in the quarter-finals.

In Division 2, the top two teams in each group advance to the quarter-finals.

In Division 3, the top two teams in each group advance to the semi-finals.

In Division 4, the top two teams in each group advance to the semi-finals.

=== Relegation ===
In Division 1, the 3 third-placed teams play a relegation semi-final and relegation final, with the loser relegated.

In Division 2, the last-placed team in each group plays in the relegation semi-finals, with the losers going into the relegation final, with the losers relegated.

In Division 3, the 2 fourth-placed teams play a relegation playoff, with the losers relegated.

== Fixtures and results ==
=== Division 1 ===
Group games were played on 15, 22 and 29 May 2021.

==== Group 1 ====
Team	Pld	W	D	L	Diff	Pts	Notes
Galway	2	2	0	0	+21	6	Advance to NCL semi-final
Limerick	2	1	0	1	–10	3	Advance to NCL quarter-final
Clare	2	0	0	2	–11	0	Relegation playoff

==== Group 2 ====
Team	Pld	W	D	L	Diff	Pts	Notes
Cork	2	2	0	0	+15	6	Advance to NCL semi-final
Tipperary	2	1	0	1	+4	3	Advance to NCL quarter-final
Waterford (R)	2	0	0	2	–19	0	Relegation playoff

==== Group 3 ====
Team	Pld	W	D	L	Diff	Pts	Notes
Kilkenny (C)	2	2	0	0	+30	6	Advance to NCL quarter-final
Offaly	2	1	0	1	–23	3	Advance to NCL quarter-final
Dublin	2	0	0	2	–7	0	Relegation playoff

==== Relegation playoffs ====
12 June 2021; 17:00 IST (UTC+1); Relegation semi-final	Clare	1-17 – 2-11	Dublin	St. Brendan's Park, Birr; Referee: John Dermody
12 June 2021; 17:00 IST (UTC+1); Relegation semi-final		Report		St. Brendan's Park, Birr; Referee: John Dermody

19 June 2021; 14:00 IST (UTC+1); Relegation final	Waterford	1-10 – 1-11	Dublin	St. Brendan's Park, Birr; Referee: John Dermody (Westmeath)
19 June 2021; 14:00 IST (UTC+1); Relegation final	B Carton 0-6(5fs); V Falconer 1-0; N Rockett, A Flynn, C O’Sullivan, S Curran (f) 0-1 each	Report	A Maher 1-7(0-5fs, 0-1 '45'); E Flanagan, K Finnegan 0-2 each	St. Brendan's Park, Birr; Referee: John Dermody (Westmeath)

==== Finals ====
5 June 2021; 17:00 IST (UTC+1); Quarter-final	Kilkenny	2-10 – 0-13	Limerick	St. Brendan's Park, Birr; Referee: John Dermody
5 June 2021; 17:00 IST (UTC+1); Quarter-final		Report		St. Brendan's Park, Birr; Referee: John Dermody

6 June 2021; 14:30 IST (UTC+1); Quarter-final	Tipperary	4-17 – 0-13	Offaly	John Locke's GAA, Callan; Referee: Justin Heffernan
6 June 2021; 14:30 IST (UTC+1); Quarter-final		Report		John Locke's GAA, Callan; Referee: Justin Heffernan

13 June 2021; 13:00 IST (UTC+1); Semi-final	Kilkenny	3-12 – 0-19	Tipperary	Nowlan Park, Kilkenny; Referee: John McDonagh
13 June 2021; 13:00 IST (UTC+1); Semi-final	D Gaule 2-8 (0-8fs, 1-0 pen); K Nolan 1-2; M O’Connell, A Doyle 0-1 each	Report	C Devane 0-11(6fs); E McGrath 0-2; R Howard, S Fryday, E Fryday, N Walsh, G O’Brien, O O’Dwyer 0-1 each	Nowlan Park, Kilkenny; Referee: John McDonagh

13 June 2021; 17:00 IST (UTC+1); Semi-final	Cork	1-17 – 1-19 a.e.t.	Galway	Nowlan Park, Kilkenny; Referee: Liz Dempsey
13 June 2021; 17:00 IST (UTC+1); Semi-final		Report		Nowlan Park, Kilkenny; Referee: Liz Dempsey

20 June 2021; 19:30 IST (UTC+1); 2021 Camogie League Final	Kilkenny	1-18 – 1-15	Galway	Croke Park, Dublin; Attendance: 2,400
20 June 2021; 19:30 IST (UTC+1); 2021 Camogie League Final		Report		Croke Park, Dublin; Attendance: 2,400
