= 1990 National Camogie League =

Camogie tournament

National Camogie League 1990
Winners
- Champions: Kilkenny (8th title)
- Captain: Breda Holmes

Runners-up
- Runners-up: Wexford

The 1990 National Camogie League is a competition in the women's team field sport of camogie was won by Kilkenny, who defeated Wexford in the final, played at Enniscorthy.

== Arrangements ==
Kilkenny lost to Cork (who scored 4-11 against them) but defeated Dublin in an evening semi-final fixture at Danesboro. The team had put in very little by way of preparation for the final.

== The Final ==
Kilkenny led by 0-5 to 0-3 at half-time in the final and won by just three points. Siobhan Dunne availed of a mistake in the Kilkenny defence to put Wexfrod in front five minutes into the second half, Ann Donwey and Bridie McGarry inspired Kilkenny to hold out for victory despite another Wexford goal in the last minute by Angie Hearne.

== Division 2 ==
The Junior National League, known since 2006 as Division Two, was won by Kildare who defeated Kilkenny intermediates in the final. Kildare beat Roscommon and Kilkenny beat Antrim in the semi-final.

=== Final stages ===
June 10
Final

Kilkenny	1-10 – 2-4	Wexford

Enniscorthy

Kilkenny	Wexford

Kilkenny:
GK	1	Marie Fitzpatrick (St Brigid’s Ballycallan)
FB	2	Biddy O'Sullivan (Shamrocks)
RWB	3	Deirdre Malone (St Brigid’s Ballycallan)
CB	4	Bridie McGarry (St Paul’s) 0-1
LWB	5	Frances Rothwell (Mooncoin) 0-1 (substituted off) 35)'
MF	6	Breda Cahill (St Brigid’s Ballycallan)
MF	7	Ann Downey (St Paul’s) (Capt) 0-1
MF	8	Jillian Dillon (St Lachtain's)
RWF	9	Marina Downey (Lisdowney) (substituted off) 32)'
CF	10	Breda Holmes (St Paul’s)
LWF	11	Angela Downey (St Paul’s) 1-2
FF	12	Bridget Mullally (St Paul’s). 1-5
Substitutes:
RWF		N Tierney for Marina Downey (substituted in) 32)'
LWB		Bridget Barnaville (Lisdowney) for Rothwell (substituted in) 35)'

Wexford:
GK	1	Eilis Kavanagh (St Martin’s)
FB	2	Tina Fitzhenry (Duffry Rovers)
RWB	3	Elsie Cody (Buffers Alley)]
CB	4	Stellah Sinnott (Buffers Alley)
LWB	5	Catherine Murphy (Monageer-Boolavogue)
MF	6	Ann Reddy (Rathnure) (Capt) 0-1
MF	7	Joan O'Leary (St Ibar's/Shelmalier)
MF	8	Christine Harding
RWF	9	Jackie Codd (Faythe Harriers)
CF	10	Angie Hearne (St Ibar's/Shelmalier) 1-1
LWF	11	Siobhan Dunne (St Ibar's/Shelmalier) 1-1
FF	12	Clare Cullen (St Ibar's/Shelmalier) 0-1

Preceded by National Camogie League 1989	National Camogie League; 1977 – present	Succeeded by National Camogie League 1991
