= 1985 National Camogie League =

Camogie tournament

National Camogie League 1985
Winners
- Champions: Kilkenny (4th title)
- Captain: Bridie McGarry

Runners-up
- Runners-up: Dublin

The 1985 National Camogie League is a competition in the women's team field sport of camogie was won by Kilkenny, who defeated Dublin in the final, played at Parnell Park.

== Arrangements ==
Dublin were the form team for the competition. As with previous League competitions their earlier county championship contributed to their success. They coasted through their section of the league running up big scores in all their games. Anne Redmond, regular full back since 1979, was unavailable for the 1984 season. Mairon Conroy filled in and stepped aside for the final. Bernie Toner, who did not play in the earlier rounds of the League, rejoining the panel for the final. A nightmare start against Dubin at the same venue put paid to Kilkenny’s 1984 championship aspirations. They started training for the 1985 season earlier than previous years with a panel of 18 including all their recognised senior players.

== The Final ==
The final went to a replay. The first day Kilkenny took a 4-3 to 1-7 half time lead and added points from M Farrell and Angela Downey on the restart before Dublin came back to equalize with a goal from Carmel Byrne and an equalizing point from Edel Murphy. Dublin were without the services of Yvonne Redmond, Germaine Noonan, Marie Connelly and Joanne Gormley while Killkenny had their full championship side for the replay. Exchanges were keen in a fast and furious game, with Kilkenny dominating the first half to lead 3-6 to 0-4 at half time. Dublin made a comeback and trailed by three points with five minutes to go and in a tremendous closing rally were unable to penetrate the Dublin defence staged by Maris Fitzpatrick, Ann Downey and Bridie McGarry.

== Division 2 ==
The Junior National League, known since 2006 as Division Two, was won by Galway’s second team who defeated Kildare by 3-10 to 3-3 in the final at Bulaun, Loughrea. The sides were level 2-5 to 3-2 at half-time but Kildare scored only once in the second half, a point in the dying minutes of the game. Donegal were semi-finalists, the high point in their camogie history of that era, with a side grown from colleges camogie playing their camogie predominantly on the ground. Four of the Donegal side, beaten 6-3 to 2-2 by Kildare, Geraldine Henry, Ita Blake, Gerri Murphy and Brid Ronaghan played in the Dublin championships with Marino and UCD, Six were studying for the Leaving Cert, including Mary Hirrell of Carndonagh community school. Galway had easy wins over Louth, Down and Kilkenny’s second team by ten points. They needed extra time to beat Clare in the quarter-final before winning by a point and beat Derry by 7-7 to 4-4 in the semi-final at Greenlock, County Londonderry. Deirde Costello scored two goals against Clare and four against Derry. Full forward Ann Ryan was a former All-Ireland Feile na nGael skills title holder and sister of hurlers Paschal and John Ryan.

=== Final stages ===
June 2
Final

Kilkenny	4-7 – 2-13	Dublin

Parnell Park
June 23
Final

Kilkenny	4-7 – 3-6	Dublin

Nowlan Park

== Draw June 2 Kilkenny 4-7 Dublin 2-13 ==
Kilkenny	Dublin

Kilkenny:
GK	1	Maris Fitzpatrick (St Brigid’s Ballycallan)
FB	2	Ann Downey (St Paul’s)
RWB	3	Anna Holden (Ballyhale Shamrocks)
CB	4	Bridie McGarry (St Paul’s) (Capt.)
LWB	5	Biddy O'Sullivan (Shamrocks)
MF	6	Liz Neary (St Paul’s)
MF	7	Deidre Maloney (St Brigid’s Ballycallan)
MF	8	[Anne Whelan (Lisdowney) 1-0
RWF	9	Margaret Farrelly (UCD)
CF	10	Angela Downey (St Paul’s) 0-3
LWF	11	Jos Dunne (Carrickshock) 1-1
FF	12	Breda Holmes (St Paul’s). 1-1

Dublin:
GK	1	Yvonne Redmond (Cúchulainn Crumlin)
FB	2	Anna Redmond (Cúchulainn Crumlin)
RWB	3	Catherine Ledwidge (Phoenix)
CB	4	Germaine Noonan (UCD)
LWB	5	Grainne Burke
MF	6	Una Crowley (Celtic)
MF	7	Mary Mernagh (Cuala Naomh Mhuire) (0-1)
MF	8	Barbara Redmond (Cúchulainn Crumlin) 0-2
RWF	9	Joanne Gormley (UCD)
CF	10	Edel Murphy (UCD) (Captain) 1-9
LWF	11	Carmel Byrne 0-2
FF	12	Marie Connelly (Celtic) 1-0

== Replay June 23 Kilkenny 4-7 Dublin 3-6 ==
Kilkenny	Dublin

Kilkenny:
GK	1	Maris Fitzpatrick (St Brigid’s Ballycallan)
FB	2	Ann Downey (St Paul’s)
RWB	3	Anna Holden
CB	4	Bridie McGarry (St Paul’s) (Capt.)
LWB	5	Biddy O'Sullivan (Shamrocks)
MF	6	Liz Neary (St Paul’s) 4-0
MF	7	Deirde Maloney (St Brigid’s Ballycallan)
MF	8	Anne Whelan (Lisdowney) 0-2
RWF	9	Margaret Farrelly
CF	10	Angela Downey (St Paul’s) 0-4
LWF	11	Jos Dunne
FF	12	Breda Holmes (St Paul’s). 0-1
FF		Siobhan Ryan for Margaret Farrell (substituted in) 46'

Dublin:
GK	1	Yvonne Redmond (Cúchulainn Crumlin)
FB	2	Anna Redmond (Cúchulainn Crumlin)
RWB	3	Catherine Ledwidge (Phoenix)
CB	4	Germaine Noonan (UCD)
LWB	5	Brenie Tone (Cuala Naomh Mhuire) 0-1
MF	6	Una Crowley (Celtic) 0-1
MF	7	Mary Mernagh (Cuala Naomh Mhuire) (0-1)
MF	8	Barbara Redmond (Cúchulainn Crumlin) 0-2
RWF	9	Joanne Gormley (UCD)
CF	10	Edel Murphy (UCD) (Captain) 2-4
LWF	11	Carmel Byrne 1-0
FF	12	Marie Connelly (Celtic)

Preceded by National Camogie League 1984	National Camogie League; 1977 – present	Succeeded by National Camogie League 1986
