= 1988 National Camogie League =

Camogie tournament

National Camogie League 1988
Winners
- Champions: Kilkenny (6th title)
- Captain: Angela Downey

Runners-up
- Runners-up: Dublin

The 1988 National Camogie League is a competition in the women's team field sport of camogie was won by Kilkenny, who defeated Dublin in the final, played at O'Toole Park. Dublin were defeated finalists for the fifth year in succession. It was the last National League to be played under the shorter (1934–89) match duration of 50 minutes.

== Arrangements ==
Dublin were missing Ann Colgan through a damaged knee, and Patricia Clinton and Carmel O'Byrne had gone to the USA for the summer. Marie O'Connell was involved in examinations and Una Crowley was unavailable.

== The Final ==
Angela Downey contributed 2-5 of Kilkenny’s total of 3-10 in the final. A solo run by Angela Downey, where she weaved her way around four Dublin defenders before scoring a goal, enabled Kilkenny to lead 1-5 to 1-4 at half-time. The deciding factor in the first half was the midfield domination of Kilkenny’s Deirdre Malone, Anna Wheland and Marina Downey. Angela Downey scored three minutes after the restart, and it was the highlight of fifteen minutes of constant Kilkenny pressure. A goal from Louise Lynch after 42 minutes gave Dublin confidence but Kilkenny regained their composure and Breda Holmes scored a match-clinching goal three minutes later.

== Dublin’s League Record ==
It was Dublin’s fifth successive defeat in a National Camogie League final and their eighth final appearance in ten years. At the time, Dublin’s scheduling of the county championship for earlier in the year than most of their competitors was assumed to give them an advantage in the National League.

== Division 2 ==
The Junior National League, known since 2006 as Division Two, was won by Armagh captained by Denise McStay, who defeated Down in the final on July 3.

=== Final stages ===
June 12
Final

Kilkenny	3-10 – 2-4	Dublin

O'Toole Park

Kilkenny	Dublin

Kilkenny:
GK	1	Marie Fitzpatrick (St Brigid’s Ballycallan)
FB	2	Rita Weymes
RWB	3	Helen Holmes (St Paul’s)
CB	4	Ann Downey (St Paul’s) 0-1
LWB	5	Biddy O'Sullivan (Shamrocks)
MF	6	Clare Jones (St Paul’s)
MF	7	Deirdre Malone (St Brigid’s Ballycallan)
MF	8	Anna Whelan (Lisdowney)
RWF	9	Marina Downey (Lisdowney) 0-2
CF	10	Breda Holmes (St Paul’s) 1-1
LWF	11	Angela Downey (St Paul’s) (Capt) 2-5
FF	12	Jo Dunne (Carrickshock) 0-1

Dublin:
GK	1	Anne Byrne (Capt)
FB	2	Mairéad Cronin
RWB	3	Denise O'Leary
CB	4	Cathy Walsh
LWB	5	Carmel Gray
MF	6	Michelle Donnelly
MF	7	Edel Murphy (UCD) 1-3
MF	8	Germaine Noonan (UCD)
RWF	9	Louise Lynch 1-0
CF	10	Mary Keane
LWF	11	Anne Cooper 0-1
FF	12	Joan Gormley (UCD)

Preceded by National Camogie League 1987	National Camogie League; 1977 – present	Succeeded by National Camogie League 1989
