= 1984 National Camogie League =

National Camogie League 1984
Winners
- Champions: Cork (1st title)
- Captain: Sandie Fitzgibbon

Runners-up
- Runners-up: Dublin

The 1984 National Camogie League is a competition in the women's team field sport of camogie was won by Cork, who defeated Dublin in the final, played at Ballinlough.

== Arrangements ==
Dublin won their group outright with three new forwards in their squad, Anna Colgan, Marie O'Connell and Carmel Byrne. Cork were held to a draw against Tipperary but beat Limerick to top the other group. Agnes Hourigan, president of the Camogie Association, wrote in the Irish Press: "Cork moved Marion Conroy to full back early in the campaign and Angela Higgins got a new life with her chance at number 12."

== The Final ==
Dublin led 0–3 to 0–2 at half-time in a disappointing final but Cork took command when Mary O'Leary deflected the ball to the net at the start of the second half. It was described as Dublin's poorest showing for many years. Clare Cronin moved to centre forward where she opened up the game for the other forwards. Six Cork points followed and Dublin's only reply was a point from Carmel O'Byrne. Agnes Hourigan wrote in the Irish Press:

Cork played for a quarter an hour and won, Dublin did not play at all. Both sides must have asked themselves over and over again how they could have been so bad. Cork had the better of things at midfield and missed the services of the injured Edel Murphy. But their forwards squandered chance after chance. Dublin’s teams of the fifties and early sixties were renowned for their teamwork. Their side on Sunday lacked any plan or leadership. Both counties have an uphill climb to prepare for the championship.

Dublin went on to win the All-Ireland title three months later, defeating Tipperary in the final.

== Division 2 ==
The Junior National League, known since 2006 as Division Two, was won by Dublin’s second team who defeated Armagh in the final. The league was divided into five sections, and Armagh, relying on Patricia Daly, Sally McCone, Ursula McGivern, and Rita McColgan defeated Derry to win their section and Cavan by 3-7 to 1-3 to qualify for the final. Dublin defeated Tyrone in the semi-final.

=== Final stages ===
June 17
Final

Cork	1-8 – 0-4	Dublin

Ballinlough

Cork	Dublin

Cork:
GK	1	Marian McCarthy (Éire Óg)
FB	2	Ellen Dineen (Éire Óg)
RWB	3	Miriam Higgins (Éire Óg)
CB	4	Cathy Landers (Killeagh)
LWB	5	Martha Kearney
MF	6	Clare Cronin (Old Als)
MF	7	Liz Dunphy
MF	8	Sandie Fitzgibbon (Glen Rovers)
RWF	9	Mary O'Leary (Watergrasshill)
CF	10	Val Fitzpatrick (Glen Rovers)
LWF	11	Ger McCarthy (Glen Rovers)
FF	12	Angela Higgins

Dublin:
GK	1	Yvonne Redmond (Cúchulainn Crumlin)
FB	2	Marion Conroy (Austin Stacks)
RWB	3	Catherine Ledwidge (Phoenix)
CB	4	Brenie Toner (Cuala Naomh Mhuire)
LWB	5	Germaine Noonan (UCD)
MF	6	Una Crowley (Celtic)
MF	7	Mary Daune
MF	8	Barbara Redmond (Cúchulainn Crumlin)
RWF	9	Joanne Gormley (UCD)
CF	10	Carmel Byrne
LWF	11	Anna Colgan (Celtic)
FF	12	Marie Connell (Celtic)

Preceded by National Camogie League 1983	National Camogie League; 1977 – present	Succeeded by National Camogie League 1985
