= 1993 National Camogie League =

Camogie tournament

National Camogie League 1993
Winners
- Champions: Kilkenny (9th title)
- Captain: Marina Downey

Runners-up
- Runners-up: Cork

The 1993 National Camogie League is a competition in the women's team field sport of camogie was won by Kilkenny, who defeated Cork in the final, played at Ballyragget.

== Arrangements ==
The tournament was played with 15-a-side on an experimental basis, three years before the rules of camogie were changed to facilitate 15-a-side teams.

== The Final ==
Kilkenny’s victory over three-in-a-row seeking Cork was regarded as a surprise. Angela Downey scored three of their goals and her twin sister Ann the fourth. Kilkenny dominated in most parts of the field. Cork were first to score with a goal after three minutes from Stephanie Delea. Points by Angela Downey and Breda Holmes put Kilkenny ahead after 15 minutes. Three well taken points by Colette O'Mahoney put Cork back in front. Ann and Angela Downey scored goals to give Kilkenny a three-point 2–5 to 1–5 lead at half time. Angela Downey’s second goal came 12 minutes into the second half, giving Kilkenny the advantage and after Cork fought back with points from Colette O'Mahoney and Fiona O'Driscoll, Angela Downey put the icing on the cake for Kilkenny with her third goal in the 16th minute to give Kilkenny a 4–7 to 1–9 lead. Cork pulled the lead back to three points before the final whistle.

== Division 2 ==
The Junior National League, known since 2006 as Division Two, was won by Armagh who defeated Dublin in the final. Armagh defeated Tipperary and Dublin defeated Galway in the semi-finals.

=== Final stages ===
June 6
Final

Kilkenny	4-7 – 1-13	Cork

Ballyragget

Kilkenny	Cork

Kilkenny:
GK	1	Marie Fitzpatrick (St Brigid’s Ballycallan)
RCB	2	Biddy O'Sullivan (Shamrocks)
FB	3	Bridget Banaville (Lisdowney)
LCB	4	Una Murphy (St Brigid’s Ballycallan)
RWB	5	Deidre Maloney (St Brigid’s Ballycallan)
CB	6	Bridie McGarry (St Paul’s)
LWB	7	Tracy Millea (St Brigid’s Ballycallan)
MF	8	Jillian Dillon (St Lachtain's)
MF	9	Marina Downey (Lisdowney) (Capt).
RWF	10	Breda Holmes (St Paul’s) 0-1
CF	11	Ann Downey (St Paul’s) 1-4
LWF	12	Angela Downey (St Paul’s) 3-1
RCF	13	Clare Jones (St Paul’s) (substituted off) 55'
FF	14	Bridget Mullally (Glenmore) 0-1
LCF	15	Joan Aylward (Glenmore) (substituted off) 30'
Substitutes:
FF		Sinéad Costello (St Lachtain's) for Aylward (substituted on) 30'
CF		Martina Meagher (St Martin’s) for Jones (substituted on) 55'

Cork:
GK	1	Cathleen Costine (Cloyne)
RCB	2	Paula Coggins (Inniscarra)
FB	3	Liz Dunphy
LCB	4	Mag Finn
RWB	5	C O'Leary
CB	6	Breda Kenny
LWB	7	Liz Towler
MF	8	Sandie Fitzgibbon (Glen Rovers)
MF	9	Denise Cronin (Glen Rovers) 0-1
RWF	10	Linda Mellerick (Glen Rovers) 0-2
CF	11	C McCarthy (substituted off) 28'
LWF	12	Stephanie Delea (Glen Rovers) 1-0
RCF	13	Ine O'Keeffe (inniscarra) 0-2 (substituted off) 48'
FF	14	Fiona O'Driscoll (Fr O'Neill’s)
LCF	15	Collette O'Mahoney (St Finbarr's)
Substitutes:
CF		Liz O'Neill 0-1 for C McCarthy (substituted on) 28'
RCF		L Lee for O'Keeffe (substituted on) 48'

Preceded by National Camogie League 1992	National Camogie League; 1977 – present	Succeeded by National Camogie League 1994
