= 1983 National Camogie League =

Camogie tournament

National Camogie League 1983
Winners
- Champions: Dublin (3rd title)
- Captain: Barbara Redmond

Runners-up
- Runners-up: Wexford

The 1983 National Camogie League is a competition in the women's team field sport of camogie was won by Dublin, who defeated Wexford in the final, played at Russell Park.

== Arrangements ==
Dublin were becoming known as league specialists as the competition entered its eighth season, partly because the Dublin championship was a winter competition and reached its climax in April and players reached a higher level of fitness than many of their opponents. Dublin defeated Louth, Galway, Kilkenny, Antrim and Down while Wexford defeated All-Ireland champions Cork in their opening game, Clare, Tipperary and Limerick. For the final Dublin had eight of the team that won the league title in 1979 and nine from 1981. Five of the Wexford panel were studying for the Leaving Cert and Marita O'Neill was grand-daughter of Martin O'Neill from Ferns, referee of the 1947 All-Ireland final and former secretary of the Leinster Council of the GAA.

== The Final ==
Dublin were set on course for their 11-point victory in the 17th minute when Mary Mernagh sent a speculative shot towards the Wexford goal, goalkeeper Kathleen Tonk misjudged the shot and it dropped into the net. Dublin led 1-6 to 0-4 at half time and started with second half with a goal from Joanne Gormley. Caroline O'Leary-Farrington collected a rebound from Dublin goalkeeper Yvonne Redmond for a Wexford goal. Joanne Gormley and Una Crowley added Dublin goals before the end.

== Division 2 ==
The Junior National League, known since 2006 as Division Two, was won by Dublin’s second team who defeated Westmeath in the final at Cusack Park, Mullingar. Westmeath had cut the Dublin lead to three points ten minutes from the end before succumbing. Dublin outclassed all their opposition en route to the final winning their matches by margins of seven goals or more. Westmeath defeated Derry 5-6 to 3-2 in the semi-final.

=== Final stages ===
May 22
Final

Dublin	4-8 – 1-6	Wexford

Russell Park

Dublin	Wexford

Dublin:
GK	1	Yvonne Redmond (Cúchulainn Crumlin)
FB	2	Anna Redmond (Cúchulainn Crumlin)
RWB	3	Germaine Noonan (UCD)
CB	4	Brenie Toner (Cuala Naomh Mhuire)
LWB	5	Catherine Docherty (Celtic)
MF	6	Una Crowley (Celtic)
MF	7	Mary Mernagh (Cuala Naomh Mhuire) 1-0
MF	8	Barbara Redmond (Cúchulainn Crumlin)
RWF	9	Edel Murphy (UCD)
CF	10	Anna Colgan (Celtic) 0-3
LWF	11	Marian Conroy (Austin Stacks) 1-5
FF	12	Joanne Gormley (UCD) 2-0

Wexford:
GK	1	Kathleen Tonk (Buffers Alley)
FB	2	Anna Butler (Kilrush St Brigid's)
RWB	3	Stella Sinnott (Buffers Alley)
CB	4	Tina Fitzhenry (Duffry Rovers)
LWB	5	Carmel Higgins (Rathnure)
MF	6	Caroline Farrington (Monageer-Boolavogue) 1-0
MF	7	Elsa Walshe (Buffers Alley) 0-4
MF	8	Anna Redd (Cloughbawn/Adamstown)
RWF	9	Gertrude O'Leary (Buffers Alley)
CF	10	Brenie Higgins (Rathnure) 0-2
LWF	11	Ornie O'Mahony
FF	12	Jackie Codd (Rathnure)

Preceded by National Camogie League 1982	National Camogie League; 1977 – present	Succeeded by National Camogie League 1984
