= 1986 National Camogie League =

Camogie tournament

National Camogie League 1986
Winners
- Champions: Cork (2nd title)

Runners-up
- Runners-up: Dublin

The 1986 National Camogie League is a competition in the women's’ team field sport of camogie was won by Cork, who defeated Dublin in the final, played at O'Toole Park.

== Arrangements ==
Dublin came through their section with full points, beating Kilkenny 3-8 to 2-1 and Galway in their final match at Silver Park. Goalkeeper Yvonne Redmond indicated she would be in the USA and was not considered for selection for the League final. Cork defeated Tipperary 3-10 to 1-3 to top their group.

== The Final ==
Two second half goals from Mary Geaney gave Cork victory in an exciting final. Playing with a strong wind, Dublin, who were without Barbara Redmond, Brenie Toner and Carmel Byrne, led by a point at half time 1-6 to 1-5 largely thanks to five points from Edel Murphy and a goal from Marie Connell. Cork midfielder Sandie Fitzibbon looked very impressive in the half, and with goal scorer Linda Mellerick and Collite O'Mahoney, who scored two points, finding their range. Points from Sandie Fitzgibbon and Ann Leahy put Cork into the lead only minutes after the restart, but Edel Murphy quickly put Dublin back in the lead with two points from frees. It all fell apart for the Dubliners in the 37th minutes when Cork full forward Mary Geaney finished a long ball from the right into the net. Dublin pulled the Cork lead back to a single point twice in the remaining quarter with points from Marie Connell and Anna Condron and with minutes left Marie Connell mishit a shot only yards from goal and Edel Murphy shot just wide from a difficult free before Mary Geaney wrapped it up in the final minute with another opportunist goal.

== Division 2 ==
The Junior National League, known since 2006 as Division Two, was won by Kildare who defeated Dublin in the final, bringing national honours to Miriam Malone who had played for two decades for Kildare. Kildare defeated Cavan and Dublin defeated Clare in the quarter-final and Derry in the semi-final.

=== Final stages ===
May 18
Final

Cork	3-8 – 1-10	Dublin

O'Toole Park

Cork	Dublin

Cork:
GK	1	Marian McCarthy (Éire Óg)
FB	2	Ellen Dineen (Éire Óg)
RWB	3	Mary Spillane (Killeagh)
CB	4	Clare Cronin (Old Als)
LWB	5	A Leahy 0-1
MF	6	Val Fitzpatrick (Glen Rovers) 0-1
MF	7	Liz Dunphy
MF	8	Sandie Fitzgibbon (Glen Rovers) 0-1
RWF	9	Collitte O'Mahoney (St Finbarr's) 0-3
CF	10	Noelle O'Driscoll 0-1
LWF	11	Linda Mellerick 1-0
FF	12	Mary Geaney (Éire Óg) 2-1

Dublin:
GK	1	Gaye Moran (UCD)
FB	2	Marian Conroy (Austin Stacks)
RWB	3	Germaine Noonan (UCD)
CB	4	Brenda Kenny (UCD) ( (substituted off) 40'
LWB	5	Helen Broderick (UCD)
MF	6	Una Crowley (Celtic)
MF	7	Mary Mernagh (Cuala Naomh Mhuire)
MF	8	Edel Murphy (UCD) (Capt) 0-7
RWF	9	Cathy Walsh 0-1 (Cúchulainn Crumlin) ( (substituted off) 30')
CF	10	Joanne Gormley (UCD)
LWF	11	Anna Conlon (Cúchulainn Crumlin) 0-1
FF	12	Marie Connelly (Celtic) 1-1
Substitutes:
RWF		Carmel Byrne (Celtic) for Walsh ( (substituted in) 30')
MF		Catherine Ledwidge (Phoenix) for Kenny ( (substituted in) 40')

Preceded by National Camogie League 1985	National Camogie League; 1977 – present	Succeeded by National Camogie League 1987
