= 1998 National Camogie League =

Women's professional sports season

National Camogie League 1998
Winners
- Champions: Cork (8th title)
- Captain: Eithne Duggan

Runners-up
- Runners-up: Galway

The 1998 National Camogie League is a competition in the women's team field sport of camogie was won by Cork, who defeated Galway in the final, played at Ballinasloe. It was the last National League to be played with 12-a-side.

== Arrangements ==
Galway beat Kilkenny 3–10 to 1–13 in the semi-final on May 24. They fell behind 1–1 to nil before two goals from Sharon Glynn and a third by Anna Forde after Glynn's pass Helped them to a first-ever victory over Kilkenny in camogie at Nowlan Park.

== The Final ==
Cork's victory in the final was largely due to the accuracy of veteran Lyn Delea who scored 12–12 in what was an outstanding individual performance. Galway took the lead with ten minutes to go for the first time from a Sharon Glynn pointed thirty, but it did not last long as Cork's Fiona O'Driscoll equalised before Lyn Delea scored a well worked goal after a pass from substitute Caoimhe Harrington. Galway lost midfielder Carmel Hannon during the first half when she injured her leg in a fall. Sharon Glynn and Vivienne Harris became the first camogie players to be sent off in a National League final when they were red carded following a tussle.

== Division 2 ==
The Junior National League, known since 2006 as Division Two, was won by Down who defeated Cork intermediates in the final at Ballincollig on June 1. Down beat Tipperary 4–12 to 1-10 and Cork beat Galway 3–10 to 1–9 in the semi-finals.

=== Final stages ===
June 1
Final

Cork	1-16 – 2-9	Galway

Ballinasloe

Cork	Galway

Cork:
GK	1	Cora Keohane (Barryroe)
FB	2	Eithne Duggan (Bishopstown) (Capt)
RWB	3	Denise Cronin (Glen Rovers)
CB	4	Vivienne Harris (Bishopstown)
LWB	5	Mag Finn (Fr O'Neill's)
MF	6	Linda Mellerick (Glen Rovers)
MF	7	Mary O'Connor (Killeagh)
MF	8	Ursula Tory (Newtownshandrum)
RWF	9	Ine O'Keeffe (Inniscarra) (substituted off) 30'
CF	10	Sinéad O'Callaghan (Ballinhassig) 0–1
LWF	11	Fiona O'Driscoll (Fr O'Neill's) 0–3
FF	12	Lyn Delea (Glen Rovers) 1-12 (0-6 frees, 0-3 30s)
Substitutes:
RWF		Caiomhe Harrington for O’Keeffe (substituted on) 45)' (substituted on) 30'

Galway:
GK	1	Louise Curry (Pearses) (0–1)
FB	2	Olive Broderick (Davitts) (Capt)
RWB	3	Alva Kelly
CB	4	Tracy Laheen (Pearses) (0–1)
LWB	5	Pamela Nevin (Mullagh) (
MF	6	Denise Gilligan (Craughwell)
MF	7	Sharon Glynn (Pearses) 0-4 (0-2 frees, 0-2 30s)
MF	8	Carmel Hannon (Pearses) (substituted off) 20'
RWF	9	Colette Nevin(Cappataggle 0–2
CF	10	Imelda Hobbins (Mullagh) (substituted off) 50'
LWF	11	Anna Forde (Pearses) 1–0
FF	12	Veronica Curtin (Kinvara) 0–2
Substitutes:
FF		Therese Maher (Athenry) 1-0 for Hannon (substituted on) 20'
FF		Michelle Glynn (Pearses) for Hobbins (substituted on) 50'

Preceded by National Camogie League 1997	National Camogie League; 1977 – present	Succeeded by National Camogie League 1999
