= 2019 National Camogie League =

Gaelic competition structure in Ireland

League details
- Dates: 20 January – 20 April 2019
- Teams: 31

League champions
- Winners: Galway (5th win)
- Captain: Sarah Dervan
- Manager: Cathal Murray

League runners-up
- Runners-up: Kilkenny
- Captain: Anna Farrell and Meighan Farrell
- Manager: Ann Downey

Other division winners
- Division 2: Tipperary
- Division 3: Kildare

The 2019 National Camogie League, known for sponsorship reasons as the Littlewoods Ireland Camogie Leagues, took place in early 2019.

Galway won Division 1, defeating Kilkenny in the final.

== Format ==
=== League structure ===
The 2019 National Camogie League consists of three divisions: 10 in Division 1, 15 in Division 2 and 6 in Division 3; division 1 is divided into two groups and Division 2 is divided into three groups. Each team plays every other team in its group once. 3 points are awarded for a win and 1 for a draw.

If two teams are level on points, the tie-break is:

- winners of the head-to-head game are ranked ahead
- if the head-to-head match was a draw, ranking is determined by the points difference (i.e. total scored minus total conceded in all games)
- if the points difference is equal, ranking is determined by the total scored

If three or more teams are level on league points, rankings are determined solely by points difference.

=== Finals ===
The top two teams in each group in Division 1 contest the National Camogie League semi-finals.

In Division 2, the three group winners and runners-up contest the quarter-finals; the three quarter-final winners then play a semi-final and final.

The top four teams in Division 3 contest the Division 3 semi-finals.

== Fixtures and results ==
=== Division 1 ===
==== Group 1 ====
Team	Pld	W	D	L	Diff	Pts	Notes
Kilkenny	4	4	0	0	+38	12	Advance to NCL semi-finals
Limerick	4	3	0	1	+12	9	Advance to NCL semi-finals
Dublin	4	1	1	2	–13	4
Clare	4	1	0	3	–13	3
Offaly	4	0	1	3	–24	1	Relegation playoff

==== Group 2 ====
Team	Pld	W	D	L	Diff	Pts	Notes
Galway	4	3	1	0	+16	10	Advance to NCL semi-finals
Cork	4	3	1	0	+10	10	Advance to NCL semi-finals
Tipperary	4	2	0	2	–7	6
Waterford	4	1	0	3	–19	3
Wexford	4	0	0	4	n/a	–3	Relegation playoff

- Wexford gave a walkover to Cork and were deducted three points. Because of this, score difference in games involving Wexford are not included when calculating overall score difference.

==== Relegation playoff ====
16 March 2019; 14:00 GMT (UTC±0); Relegation playoff	Offaly	4-15 – 1-6	Wexford	Hawkfield
16 March 2019; 14:00 GMT (UTC±0); Relegation playoff		Report		Hawkfield

==== Finals ====
10 March 2019; 14:00 GMT (UTC±0); Semi-Final	Kilkenny	0-12 – 0-9	Cork	WIT Arena, Carriganore; Referee: John Dermody
10 March 2019; 14:00 GMT (UTC±0); Semi-Final		Report		WIT Arena, Carriganore; Referee: John Dermody

10 March 2019; 14:00 GMT (UTC±0); Semi-Final	Galway	2-14 – 0-4	Limerick	St Brendan's Park, Birr
10 March 2019; 14:00 GMT (UTC±0); Semi-Final		Report		St Brendan's Park, Birr

31 March 2019; 12:00 IST (UTC+1); Final	Kilkenny	2-8 – 0-16	Galway	Croke Park, Dublin; Referee: C Egan (Cork)
31 March 2019; 12:00 IST (UTC+1); Final	M Quilty 1-1(0-1f); D Morrissey 0-3(2fs); A Dalton 1-0; K Power 0-2; D Gaule (f), C Phelan (45) 0-1 each	Report	C Dolan 0-8(7fs, 1 45); A Donohue 0-3; N Kilkenny, N Hanniffy 0-2 each; A O’Reilly 0-1	Croke Park, Dublin; Referee: C Egan (Cork)

=== Division 2 ===
==== Finals ====
30 March 2019; Quarter-Final	Galway Intermediate	1-5 – 1-9	Kilkenny Intermediate	St Rynagh's Park, Banagher

31 March 2019; Quarter-Final	Meath	0-7 – 0-8	Westmeath	Inniskeen Grattans, Inniskeen

31 March 2019; Quarter-Final	Derry	1-7 – 3-10	Tipperary Intermediate	Inniskeen Grattans, Inniskeen

7 April 2019; Semi-Final	Tipperary Intermediate	3-9 – 1-12	Westmeath	St Rynagh's Park, Banagher
7 April 2019; Semi-Final		Report		St Rynagh's Park, Banagher

20 April 2019; 15:00 IST; Final	Kilkenny Intermediate	0-8 – 0-14	Tipperary Intermediate	St Rynagh's Park, Banagher; Referee: Philip McDonald (Cavan)
20 April 2019; 15:00 IST; Final	K Hamilton 0-4(3fs), K Nolan 0-2(fs); C Pelan, L Green (f) 0-1 each	Report	J Grace 0-8(7fs); A Loughnane 0-4; N Treacy, C McKeogh 0-1 each	St Rynagh's Park, Banagher; Referee: Philip McDonald (Cavan)

=== Division 3 ===
==== Finals ====
20 April 2019; 13:00 IST; Final	Kildare	2-9 – 0-11	Limerick Intermediate	St. Rynagh's Park, Banagher; Referee: Barry Nea (Westmeath)
20 April 2019; 13:00 IST; Final	C Shiels 2-0, S Hurley 0-8(4fs, 3 45s), L Sutton 0-1	Report	R Noonan 0-8(2fs, 2 45s, 1 pen), L Browne, C O’Brien, Aisling Cunningham	St. Rynagh's Park, Banagher; Referee: Barry Nea (Westmeath)
