= 2022 National Camogie League =

Camogie tournament

League details
- Dates: 5 February – 9 April 2022
- Teams: 35

League champions
- Winners: Galway (6th win)
- Captain: Sarah Dervan
- Manager: Cathal Murray

League runners-up
- Runners-up: Cork
- Captain: Amy Lee

Other division winners
- Division 2: Wexford
- Division 3: Cavan
- Division 4: Mayo

The 2022 National Camogie League, known for sponsorship reasons as the Littlewoods Ireland Camogie Leagues, commenced in February 2022.

== Format ==
=== League structure ===
The 2022 National Camogie League consisted of four divisions, each divided into several groups:

- Division 1 contained 9 teams, divided into one group of 5 and one group of 4
- Division 2 contained 13 teams, divided into one group of 5 and two groups of 4
- Division 3 contained 9 teams, divided into one group of 5 and one group of 4
- Division 4 contained 4 teams, all in one group

Each team played every other team in its group once. 3 points were awarded for a win and 1 for a draw.

If two teams are level on points, the tie-break is:

- winners of the head-to-head game are ranked ahead
- if the head-to-head match was a draw, ranking is determined by the points difference (i.e. total scored minus total conceded in all games)
- if the points difference is equal, ranking is determined by the total scored

If three or more teams are level on league points, rankings are determined solely by points difference.

=== Finals and relegation ===
In Division 1, the group winners meet in the NCL final, while the last-placed team in each group goes into the relegation playoff.

In Division 2, the top two in each group advance to the knockout phase (two group winners get a bye to the semi-finals), with the division champions promoted, while the three last-placed teams play off in a relegation semi-final and final with one team relegated.

In Division 3, the group winners meet in the final, with the division champions promoted, while the last-placed team in each group goes into the relegation playoff.

In Division 4, the top two teams meet in the final, with the division champions promoted.

== Fixtures and results ==
=== Division 1 ===
==== Group 1 ====
Team	Pld	W	D	L	Diff	Pts	Notes
Galway	4	4	0	0	+50	12	Advance to NCL Final
Tipperary	4	3	0	1	+50	9
Dublin	4	2	0	2	+7	6
Down	4	1	0	3	-51	3
Offaly	4	0	0	4	-56	0	Relegation playoff

==== Group 2 ====
Team	Pld	W	D	L	Diff	Pts	Notes
Cork	3	2	1	0	+34	7	Advance to NCL Final
Kilkenny	3	2	1	0	+9	7
Clare	3	1	0	2	-7	3
Limerick	3	0	0	3	-36	0	Relegation playoff

Round-robin results

==== Finals ====
9 April 2022 Relegation playoff	Offaly	2-07 – 1-06	Limerick

9 April 2022 National Camogie League Final	Galway	2-14 – 1-13	Cork
		(HT: 0-07 - 1-10)		Venue: Croke Park
		Report		Referee: John Dermody (Westmeath)
