= 1992 National Camogie League =

Camogie tournament

National Camogie League 1992
Winners
- Champions: Cork (4th title)
- Captain: Sandie Fitzgibbon

Runners-up
- Runners-up: Wexford

The 1992 National Camogie League is a competition in the women's team field sport of camogie was won by Cork, who defeated Wexford in the final, played at Enniscorthy.

== Arrangements ==
Wexford beat Dublin by 2-14 to 3-3 in the semi-final at O'Toole Park.

== The Final ==
Cork outclassed Wexford in the final on front of a large crowd at Bellefield, Enniscorthy. Two goals just before half time from Fiona O'Driscoll and Collette O'Mahony killed off any chance Wexford had, and left Cork 2-10 to 0-6 at half time. The Irish Press reported:

Wexford squandered too many scoring opportunities during the game, their forwards having a completely off day.

== Division 2 ==
The Junior National League, known since 2006 as Division Two, was won by Limerick who defeated Down in the final.

=== Final stages ===
June 14
Final

Cork	2-17 – 0-11	Wexford

Enniscorthy

Cork	Wexford

Cork:
GK	1	Cathleen Costine (Killeagh)
FB	2	Breda Kenny
RWB	3	Paula Coggins (Inniscarra)
CB	4	Irne O'Leary (substituted off) 49'
LWB	5	Liz Towler
MF	6	Linda Mellerick (Glen Rovers) 0-1
MF	7	Sandie Fitzgibbon (Glen Rovers) (Capt) 0-1
MF	8	Denise Cronin 0-1 (substituted off) 36'
RWF	9	Ine O'Keeffe (inniscarra) 0-3
CF	10	Liz O'Neill 0-3
LWF	11	Colette O'Mahoney (St Finbarr's) 1-5
FF	12	Fiona O'Driscoll (Fr O'Neill’s) 1-5
Substitutes:
FF		Liz Dunphy for Cronin (substituted in) 36'
RWF		Therese O'Callaghan for Irene O'Leary (substituted in) 49'

Wexford:
GK	1	Terri Butler (Buffers Alley)
FB	2	Tina Fitzhenry (Duffry Rovers)
RWB	3	Jean O'Leary (St Ibar's/Shelmalier)
CB	4	Catherine Murphy (Rathnure) (Capt) 0-4
LWB	5	Deidre Hearne (St Ibar's/Shelmalier)
MF	6	Paula Sinnott (Buffers Alley)
MF	7	Stella Sinnott (Buffers Alley) (substituted off) 36'
MF	8	Geraldine Codd (Rathnure)
RWF	9	Anne Marie O'Connor (Rathnure) 0-2
CF	10	Anna Reddy (Rathnure) 0-2
LWF	11	Paula Rankin (Bunclody) 0-1
FF	12	Máire Codd (Rathnure)
Substitutes:
FF		Angie Hearne (St Ibar's/Shelmalier) for Sinnott (substituted in) 36'

Preceded by National Camogie League 1991	National Camogie League; 1977 – present	Succeeded by National Camogie League 1993
