= 2026 National Camogie League =

League details
- Dates: 14 February – 12 April, 2026
- Teams: 27

League champions
- Winners: Galway (8th win)
- Captain: Carrie Dolan
- Manager: Cathal Murray

League runners-up
- Runners-up: Waterford
- Captain: Lorraine Bray
- Manager: Michael Boland

Other division winners
- Division 1B: Clare
- Division 2: Kerry
- Division 3A: Armagh
- Division 3B: Mayo

The 2026 National Camogie League, known for sponsorship reasons as the Centra Camogie Leagues, was held in spring 2026. Galway were the winners. Compared to the 2025 season. Mayo, Monaghan and Donegal participated in the new division 3B.

== Format ==
=== League structure ===
The 2026 National Camogie League consists of five divisions:

- Division 1A contains 6 teams
- Division 1B contains 6 teams
- Division 2 contains 6 teams
- Division 3A contains 5 teams
- Division 3B contains 4 teams

Each team plays every other team in its division once. 3 points are awarded for a win and 1 for a draw.

If two teams are level on points, the tie-break is based on points difference.

=== Finals and relegation ===
In Division 1A, the top two teams meet in the Camogie League final. The last-placed team is relegated to 1B.

In Division 1B, the top two teams meet in the final, with the division champions promoted. The last-placed team is relegated to Division 2.

In Division 2, the top two teams meet in the final, with the division champions promoted to Division 1B. The last-placed team is relegated to Division 3A.

In Division 3A, the top two meet in the final, with the division champions promoted to Division 2. The last-placed team is relegated to Division 3B.

In Division 3B, the top two meet in the final, with the division champions promoted to Division 3A.

== Fixtures and results ==
=== Division 1A ===
Team	Pld	W	D	L	Diff	Pts	Notes
Waterford	5	4	0	1	+12	12	Advance to NCL Final
Galway (C)	5	3	0	2	+9	9	Advance to NCL Final
Kilkenny	5	3	0	2	+4	9
Tipperary	5	2	1	2	+23	7
Cork	5	1	1	3	–5	4
Antrim	5	1	0	4	–31	3	Relegation

==== Final ====
12 April 2026 National Camogie League Final	Waterford	0-11 (11) – (13) 0-13	Galway	Kilkenny
				Venue: UPMC Nowlan Park
		Report		Referee: Liz Dempsey (Kilkenny)

=== Division 1B ===
Team	Pld	W	D	L	Diff	Pts	Notes
Clare (P)	5	4	1	0	+31	13	Advance to Final
Dublin	5	3	1	1	+24	10	Advance to Final
Limerick	5	3	0	2	+1	9
Wexford	5	2	0	3	–3	6
Offaly	5	1	0	4	–23	3
Down	5	1	0	4	–30	3	Relegation

==== Final ====
12 April 2026 Division 1B Final	Clare	3-11 (20) – (17) 0-17	Dublin	Kilkenny
		(HT: 0-5 – 0-7)		Venue: UPMC Nowlan Park
		Report		Referee: Cathal McAllister (Cork)

=== Division 2 ===
Team	Pld	W	D	L	Diff	Pts	Notes
Kerry (P)	5	4	1	0	+51	13	Advance to Final
Meath	5	3	1	1	+19	10	Advance to Final
Laois	5	3	1	1	+1	10
Derry	5	2	0	3	–26	6
Westmeath	5	1	0	4	–5	3
Carlow	5	0	1	4	–13	1	Relegation

==== Final ====
11 April 2026 Division 2 Final	Kerry	1-07 (10) – (8) 0-08	Meath	Banagher
		(HT: 0-2 – 0-6)		Venue: St Rynagh's Park
		Report

=== Division 3A ===
Team	Pld	W	D	L	Diff	Pts	Notes
Armagh (P)	4	4	0	0	+49	12	Advance to Final
Roscommon	4	2	0	2	+9	6	Advance to Final
Kildare	4	2	0	2	+3	6
Tyrone	4	2	0	2	+3	6
Wicklow	4	0	0	4	–65	0	Relegation

==== Final ====
11 April 2026 Division 3A Final	Armagh	1-14 (17) – (11) 1-08	Roscommon	Abbotstown
14:00 IST (UTC+1)		(HT: 1-10 – 0-4)		Venue: National Sports Campus
		Report		Referee: Alan Doheny (Laois)

=== Division 3B ===
Team	Pld	W	D	L	Diff	Pts	Notes
Mayo (P)	3	3	0	0	+33	9	Advance to Final
Monaghan	3	2	0	1	+5	6	Advance to Final
Louth	3	1	0	2	–13	3
Donegal	3	0	0	3	–25	0

==== Final ====
22 March 2026 Division 3B Final	Mayo	2-12 (18) – (9) 1-06	Monaghan	Edgeworthstown
				Venue: Hugh Divine Park
		Report		Referee: Ciaran Groome
