= 2020 National Camogie League =

Camogie tournament

League details
- Dates: 1 February – 8 March 2020 (not completed)
- Teams: 34

League champions

The 2020 National Camogie League, known for sponsorship reasons as the Littlewoods Ireland Camogie Leagues, took place in Ireland in spring 2020. Several new rules are being trialled, to do with contact, persistent fouling, puckouts, dropping the camogie stick, hand-pass goals and penalty shots.

The league was originally scheduled to end in April 2020, but public health measures introduced to combat the spread of the COVID-19 pandemic in Ireland caused the final stages to be delayed. In June 2020 it was announced that the league was to be cancelled.

== Format ==
=== League structure ===
The 2020 National Camogie League consists of three divisions: 9 in Division 1, 14 in Division 2 and 11 in Division 3; divisions 1 and 3 are divided into two groups and Division 2 is divided into three groups. Each team plays every other team in its group once. 3 points are awarded for a win and 1 for a draw.

If two teams are level on points, the tie-break is:

- winners of the head-to-head game are ranked ahead
- if the head-to-head match was a draw, ranking is determined by the points difference (i.e. total scored minus total conceded in all games)
- if the points difference is equal, ranking is determined by the total scored

If three or more teams are level on league points, rankings are determined solely by points difference.

=== Finals ===
The winners of each group in Division 1 contest the National Camogie League final.

In Division 2, the three group winners and runners-up contest the quarter-finals; the three quarter-final winners then play a semi-final and final.

The two group winners in Division 3 contest the Division 3 final.

== Fixtures and results ==
=== Division 1 ===
==== Group 1 ====
Team	Pld	W	D	L	Diff	Pts	Notes
Cork	2	2	0	0	+23	6	Advance to NCL final
Clare	3	2	0	1	+6	6
Waterford	3	2	0	1	–7	4
Kilkenny	3	1	0	2	–10	3
Offaly	3	0	1	2	–12	1	Relegation playoff

- League cancelled with three games still to play (Clare v Cork, Offaly v Cork, Waterford v Kilkenny).

==== Group 2 ====
Team	Pld	W	D	L	Diff	Pts	Notes
Tipperary	3	3	0	0	+22	9	Advance to NCL final
Galway	3	2	0	1	+6	6
Limerick	3	1	0	2	–16	3
Dublin	3	0	0	3	–12	0	Relegation playoff

==== Relegation playoff ====
TBA; Relegation playoff	Offaly/Kilkenny	Cancelled	Dublin

==== Final ====
TBA; Final	Cork/Clare/Waterford	Cancelled	Tipperary
