= 2018 National Camogie League =

Camogie tournament

League details
- Dates: 14 January – 29 April 2018
- Teams: 29

League champions
- Winners: Kilkenny (14th win)
- Captain: Shelly Farrell
- Manager: Ann Downey

League runners-up
- Runners-up: Cork
- Captain: Aoife Murray
- Manager: Paudie Murray

Other division winners
- Division 2: Cork
- Division 3: Kerry

The 2018 National Camogie League, known for sponsorship reasons as the Littlewoods Ireland Camogie Leagues, commenced in January 2018 and was won by Kilkenny.

Kilkenny were the Division 1 champions, their fourth win in five seasons.

== Format ==
=== League structure ===
The 2018 National Camogie League consists of three divisions: eleven teams in Division 1, thirteen teams in Division 2 and four in Division 3; Divisions 1 and 2 are divided into two groups. Each team plays every other team in its group once. 3 points are awarded for a win and 1 for a draw.

If two teams are level on points, the tie-break is:

- winners of the head-to-head game are ranked ahead
- if the head-to-head match was a draw, ranking is determined by the points difference (i.e. total scored minus total conceded in all games)
- if the points difference is equal, ranking is determined by the total scored

If three or more teams are level on league points, rankings are determined solely by points difference.

=== Finals, promotion and relegation ===
The top two teams in each group in Division 1 contest the National Camogie League semi-finals. The last-placed team in each group contest the relegation playoff.

The top two teams in each group in Division 2 contest the Division 2 semi-finals. The last-placed team in each group contest the relegation playoff.

All four teams in Division 3 contest the Division 3 semi-finals.

== Fixtures and results ==
=== Division 1 ===
==== Group 1 ====
Team	Pld	W	D	L	Pts	Diff	Notes
Cork	4	4	0	0	12	+22	Advance to NCL semi-finals
Galway	4	3	0	1	9	+11	Advance to NCL semi-finals
Wexford	4	2	0	2	6	+6
Tipperary	4	1	0	3	3	–10
Offaly	4	0	0	4	0	–29	Relegation playoff

==== Group 2 ====
Team	Pld	W	D	L	Pts	Diff	Notes
Kilkenny	5	4	0	1	12	+45	Advance to NCL semi-finals
Limerick	5	2	2	1	8	+17	Advance to NCL semi-finals
Waterford	5	2	2	1	8	+6
Dublin	5	2	1	2	7	–8
Clare	5	2	1	2	7	–2
Meath	5	0	0	5	0	–58	Relegation playoff

==== Finals ====
11 March 2018; 2 p.m. Semi-Final	Cork	2-17 – 2-13	Limerick	Cork IT

11 March 2018; Semi-Final	Kilkenny	2-10 – 1-9	Galway	St. Rynagh's GAA, Banagher

8 April 2018; Final	Cork	1-11 – 0-15	Kilkenny	Nowlan Park, Kilkenny; Referee: R Kelly (Kildare)
8 April 2018; Final	Orla Cronin 1-01, Orla Cotter 0-03 (0-03 frees), Linda Collins 0-03, Katrina Mackey 0-02, Gemma O’Connor 0-01, Ashling Thompson 0-01	Report	Denise Gaule 0-06 (0-04 frees, 0-01 ’45), Miriam Walshe 0-03, Katie Power 0-02, Jenny Clifford 0-02, Shelly Farrell 0-01, Aoife Doyle 0-01	Nowlan Park, Kilkenny; Referee: R Kelly (Kildare)

=== Division 2 ===
==== Finals ====
22 April 2018; 2 p.m. IST; Semi-Final	Westmeath	3-10 – 1-6	Dublin "B"	Conneff Park, Clane
22 April 2018; 2 p.m. IST; Semi-Final		Report		Conneff Park, Clane

22 April 2018; 2 p.m. IST; Semi-Final	Kilkenny "B"	0-9 – 1-13	Cork "B"	Walsh Park, Waterford
22 April 2018; 2 p.m. IST; Semi-Final	Edel Coonan (0-4); Stefi Fitzgerald (0-3); Lydia Fitzpatrick, Maguerite Hoynes (0-1 each)	Report	Rachel O'Callaghan (1-2); Keeva McCarthy (0-5); Katelyn Hickey (0-3); Caroline Sugrue (0-2); Kate Wall (0-1)	Walsh Park, Waterford

29 April 2018; Final	Westmeath	1-4 – 0-8	Cork "B"	Páirc Lachtáin, Freshford; Referee: J McDonagh (Galway)
29 April 2018; Final	P Greville 1-4(fs)	Report	C Sugrue, K Hickey, K McCarthy (1 '45') 0-2 each; R O’Shea (f), K Wall 0-1 each	Páirc Lachtáin, Freshford; Referee: J McDonagh (Galway)

=== Division 3 ===
==== Finals ====
15 April 2018; 2 p.m. IST; Final	Kerry	2-8 – 0-4	Roscommon	The Ragg, Bouladuff; Referee: Paul Ryan (Kildare)
15 April 2018; 2 p.m. IST; Final	P Diggin 1-4 (1-3fs); A Whelan 1-0; A Behan 0-2; L Collins, C Shanahan 0-1 each	Report	S Spillane 0-3(fs); R Fitzmaurice 0-1	The Ragg, Bouladuff; Referee: Paul Ryan (Kildare)
