= 1994 National Camogie League =

Camogie tournament

National Camogie League 1994
Winners
- Champions: Galway (1st title)
- Captain: Deidre Costello

Runners-up
- Runners-up: Tipperary
- Manager: John Kennedy

The 1994 National Camogie League is a competition in the women's team field sport of camogie was won by Galway for the first time, defeating Tipperary in the final, played at Ballinasloe.

== Arrangements ==
For the second season the National League was played on an experimental basis with 15-a-side in advance of camogie moving to the 15-a-side game in 1999. Tipperary, who had won the Intermediate Championship in 1996, entered the senior league to gain some experience of playing at this level and defeated Wexford, Kildare, Clare and surprised Kilkenny 4–8 to 2–7 in the semi-final to reach their first final since the 1976–77 season. Deirdre Hughes scored 3–3 and Noelle Kennedy 1–8 in the semi-final. Galway pulled off a surprise in the other semi-final as two first half goals by Olive Broderick gave them the platform to defeat Cork by 5–10 to 2–6.

== The Final ==
Galway opened up an early 0–4 to 0–1 lead in the sunshine in the final before Noelle Kennedy put the sides level with a well taken goal for Tipeperary. The sides were level four times between then and half time when the score was Galway -0-7 Tipperary 1-4. Galway broke clear at the beginning of the second half and opened up a five-point lead through two points by Sharon Glynn and a goal by Imelda Hobbins.

== Division 2 ==
The Junior National League, known since 2006 as Division Two, was won by Armagh who defeated Cork intermediates in the final.

=== Final stages ===
June 12
Final

Galway	1-13 – 1-8	Tipperary

Ballinasloe

Galway	Tipperary

Galway:
GK	1	Treace Laheen
RCB	2	Olivia Costello (Sarsfields)
FB	3	Sheila Coen
LCB	4	Brigid Kilgannon]
RWB	5	Carmel Allen (Craughwell)
CB	6	Bride Stratford (Sarsfields)
LWB	7	Pamela Nevin (Mullagh)
MF	8	Imelda Meagher (Athenry) (substituted off) 28'
MF	9	Brigid Fahey
RWF	10	Alicia Murphy (substituted off) 32'
CF	11	Sharon Glynn (Pearses) 0-10 (0-9 frees)
LWF	12	Imelda Hobbins (Mullagh) 1-0
RCF	13	Olive Broderick (Davitts)
FF	14	Deidre Costello (Davitts) 0-1
LCF	15	Ann Ryan
Substitutes:
MF		Dympna Meagher (Athenry) for Imelda Maher (substituted in) 28'
RWF		Martina Harkins (Pearses) for Alice Murphy (substituted in) 32'

Tipperary:
GK	1	Ailish Delaney (Toomevara)
RCB	2	Anna Gleeson (Holycross/Ballycahill)
FB	3	Teresa Burke (Shannon Rovers)
LCB	4	Siobhan Cusack (Toomevara)
RWB	5	Regina O'Mara (Toomevara)
CB	6	Cora Kennedy (Toomevara)
LWB	7	Clare Maddon (Portroe)
MF	8	Meadhbh Stokes (Clonmel)
MF	9	Kaiffe Maloney (Cashel)
RWF	10	Noelle Kennedy (Toomevara) 1-7 (0-6 frees, 1 65)
CF	11	Catherine Burke (Shannon Rovers)
LWF	12	Helen Kiely (Drom-Inch)
RCF	13	Gillian O'Neill (Thurles)
FF	14	Deirdre Hughes (Toomevara) 0-1 free
LCF	15	Anna Gleeson (Toomevara)

Preceded by National Camogie League 1993	National Camogie League; 1977 – present	Succeeded by National Camogie League 1995
