= 1979 National Camogie League =

Camogie tournament

National Camogie League 1979
Winners
- Champions: Dublin (1st title)
- Captain: Anne O'Brien

Runners-up
- Runners-up: Limerick

The 1979 National Camogie League is a competition in the women's team field sport of camogie was won by Dublin, who defeated Limerick in the final, played at Russell Park.

== Arrangements ==
For the first time the league was divided into four, rather than two zones. Dublin defeated Derry, Wicklow and Antrim easily but were held to a draw by Cork in the semi-final, scoring 2-2 in the first ten minutes and leading 3-4 to 0-5 at half-time. They won the replay at Blanchardstown by 5-5 to 3-4 despite another brave second half rally by Cork. Limerick defeated the holders Kilkenny and Clare and then Down in the semi-final.

== The Final ==
The final was the lowest scoring in the history of the League. Agnes Hourigan, who was then president of the Camogie Association, wrote in the Irish Press:

Their busy programme over the past few months was an advantage for Dublin. They were sharper and faster to the ball and would have own by a bigger margin were it not for the superb defensive work of the Limerick side.

=== Final stages ===
October 21
Semi-Final

Limerick	4-2 – 0-4	Down

Adare

October 21
Semi-Final

Limerick	4-9 – 4-9 after extra time	Down

Páirc Uí Chaoimh

November 4
Semi-Final Replay

Limerick	5-5 – 3-4	Down

Russell Park

November 18
Final

Dublin	0-6 – 0-0	Limerick

Russell Park

Dublin	Limerick

Dublin:
GK	1	Anne Carey
FB	2	Annie O'Brien
RWB	3	Sheila Wallace
CB	4	Marian Conroy
LWB	5	Catherine Doherty
MF	6	Ann McManus
MF	7	Mary Murphy
MF	8	Barbra Redmond
RWF	9	Marian Conroy
CF	10	Edel Murphy
LWF	11	Mary Mernagh
FF	12	Barbra O'Brien

Limerick:
GK	1	Helen Butler
FB	2	Vera Mackey
RWB	3	Bernadette O'Brien
CB	4	Geraldine O'Brien
LWB	5	Marjorie Neville
MF	6	Annie O'Sullivan
MF	7	Helen Mulcair
MF	8	Pauline McCarthy
RWF	9	Anna Sheehy
CF	10	Carrie Clancy
LWF	11	Betty Conroy
FF	12	Brenda Strokes

Preceded by National Camogie League 1978	National Camogie League; 1977 – present	Succeeded by National Camogie League 1980
