= 2016 National Camogie League =

Camogie tournament

League details
- Dates: 21 February – 1 May 2016
- Teams: 28

League champions
- Winners: Kilkenny (12th win)
- Captain: Michelle Quilty
- Manager: Ann Downey

League runners-up
- Runners-up: Galway
- Captain: Niamh Kilkenny
- Manager: Ollie Bergin

Other division winners
- Division 2: Meath
- Division 3: Armagh

The 2016 National Camogie League, known for sponsorship reasons as the Irish Daily Star National Camogie League, was held in spring 2016 and won by Kilkenny.

== Format ==
=== League structure ===
The 2016 National Camogie League consists of three divisions: 11 in Division 1, 12 in Division 2 and 5 in Division 3; 1 and 2 are divided into two groups. Each team plays every other team in its group once. 3 points are awarded for a win and 1 for a draw.

If two teams are level on points, the tie-break is:

- winners of the head-to-head game are ranked ahead
- if the head-to-head match was a draw, ranking is determined by the points difference (i.e. total scored minus total conceded in all games)
- if the points difference is equal, ranking is determined by the total scored

If three or more teams are level on league points, rankings are determined solely by points difference.

=== Finals, promotions and relegations ===
The top two teams in each group in Division 1 contest the National Camogie League semi-finals.

The top two teams in each group in Division 2 contest the Division 2 semi-finals.

The top four teams in Division 3 contest the Division 3 semi-finals.

== Fixtures and results ==
=== Division 1 ===
==== Group 1 ====
Team	Pld	W	D	L	Diff	Pts	Notes
Galway	5	5	0	0	+44	15	Advance to NCL semi-finals
Tipperary	5	3	0	2	0	9	Advance to NCL semi-finals
Clare	5	2	0	3	–6	6
Offaly	5	2	0	3	–10	6
Wexford	5	1	1	3	–10	4
Dublin	5	1	1	3	–18	4

==== Group 2 ====
Team	Pld	W	D	L	Diff	Pts	Notes
Kilkenny	4	3	0	1	+35	9	Advance to NCL semi-finals
Limerick	4	3	0	1	+20	9	Advance to NCL semi-finals
Cork	4	3	0	1	+20	9
Waterford	4	1	0	3	–23	3
Derry	4	0	0	4	–52	0	Relegated

- Limerick defeated Cork in a playoff.

==== Finals ====
16 April 2016; Semi-Final	Galway	1-11 – 0-13	Limerick	St Brendan's Park, Birr; Referee: Cathal Egan

17 April 2016; Semi-Final	Kilkenny	2-13 – 0-15; AET	Tipperary	WIT Sports Campus Waterford; Referee: Ray Kelly

1 May 2016; Final	Galway	0-7 – 2-7	Kilkenny	Semple Stadium, Thurles; Referee: Cathal Egan (Cork)
1 May 2016; Final	Niamh McGrath 0-6 (6f), Aoife Donoghue 0-1	Report	Anna Farrell, Julieann Malone 1-1 each; Denise Gaule 0-3 (3f); Ann Dalton, Sarah Ann Quinlan 0-1 each	Semple Stadium, Thurles; Referee: Cathal Egan (Cork)

=== Division 2 ===
==== Finals ====
17 April 2016; Semi-Final	Meath	0-14 – 1-9	Carlow	Conneff Park, Clane; Referee: John McDonagh

17 April 2016; Semi-Final	Kildare	1-9 – 0-13	Galway "B"	The Ragg; Referee: John Dermody

30 April 2016; Final	Meath	1-10 – 2-3	Galway "B"	St Brendan's Park, Birr
30 April 2016; Final		Report		St Brendan's Park, Birr

=== Division 3 ===
==== Finals ====
10 April 2016; Semi-Final	Armagh	1-14 – 2-10	Dublin "B"	Kinnegad
10 April 2016; Semi-Final		Report		Kinnegad

10 April 2016; Semi-Final	Kerry	0-5 – 2-8	Roscommon	Gort

30 April 2016; 2 p.m. Final	Armagh	3-11 – 2-9	Roscommon	Kinnegad
