= 2014 National Camogie League =

Camogie tournament

League details
- Dates: February – 4 May 2014

League champions
- Winners: Kilkenny (11th win)
- Captain: Leann Fennelly

League runners-up
- Runners-up: Clare
- Captain: Kate Lynch

The 2014 National Camogie League, known for sponsorship reasons as the Irish Daily Star National Camogie League, commenced in February 2014 and was won by Kilkenny.
