= 2017 National Camogie League =

Camogie tournament

League details
- Dates: 18 February – 30 April 2017
- Teams: 28

League champions
- Winners: Kilkenny (13th win)
- Captain: Anna Farrell
- Manager: Ann Downey

League runners-up
- Runners-up: Cork
- Captain: Rena Buckley
- Manager: Paudie Murray

Other division winners
- Division 2: Cork
- Division 3: Dublin

The 2017 National Camogie League, known for sponsorship reasons as the Littlewoods Ireland Camogie Leagues, was played in spring 2017.

Kilkenny were the Division 1 champions, their third win in four seasons.

== Format ==
=== League structure ===
The 2017 National Camogie League consists of three divisions: 11 in Division 1, 12 in Division 2 and 5 in Division 3; 1 and 2 are divided into two groups. Each team plays every other team in its group once. 3 points are awarded for a win and 1 for a draw.

If two teams are level on points, the tie-break is:

- winners of the head-to-head game are ranked ahead
- if the head-to-head match was a draw, ranking is determined by the points difference (i.e. total scored minus total conceded in all games)
- if the points difference is equal, ranking is determined by the total scored

If three or more teams are level on league points, rankings are determined solely by points difference.

=== Finals, promotions and relegations ===
The top two teams in each group in Division 1 contest the National Camogie League semi-finals.

The top two teams in each group in Division 2 contest the Division 2 semi-finals.

The top four teams in Division 3 contest the Division 3 semi-finals.

== Fixtures and results ==
=== Division 1 ===
==== Group 1 ====
Team	Pld	W	D	L	Diff	Pts	Notes
Cork	5	5	0	0	+44	15	Advance to NCL semi-finals
Kilkenny	5	3	0	2	+28	9	Advance to NCL semi-finals
Tipperary	5	3	0	2	–8	9
Wexford	5	2	0	3	–9	6
Waterford	5	1	0	4	–33	3
Dublin	5	1	0	4	–22	3

- Kilkenny are ranked ahead of Tipperary as they won the head-to-head game between the teams
- Waterford are ranked ahead of Dublin as they won the head-to-head game between the teams

==== Group 2 ====
Team	Pld	W	D	L	Diff	Pts	Notes
Galway	4	4	0	0	+48	12	Advance to NCL semi-finals
Limerick	4	3	0	1	+8	9	Advance to NCL semi-finals
Offaly	4	2	0	2	–1	6
Clare	4	1	0	3	–18	3
Meath	4	0	0	4	–37	0

==== Finals ====
9 April 2017; 16:00; Semi-Final	Cork	3-15 – 0-12	Limerick	Páirc Uí Rinn, Cork; Referee: Owen Elliott

9 April 2017; Semi-Final	Galway	0-11 – 1-14	Kilkenny	Semple Stadium, Thurles; Referee: Eamon Cassidy

23 April 2017; 15:30; Final	Cork	0-10 – 2-7	Kilkenny	Gaelic Grounds, Limerick; Referee: Owen Elliott (Antrim)
23 April 2017; 15:30; Final	K Mackey 0-4(3fs); O Cotter 0-3(1f); G O’Connor, L Coppinger, H Looney 0-1 each	Report	D Gaule 1-2 (0-1f); M Walsh 1-0; K Power 0-2; A Dunphy, J A Malone, D Morrissey (f) 0-1 each	Gaelic Grounds, Limerick; Referee: Owen Elliott (Antrim)

=== Division 2 ===
==== Finals ====
16 April 2017; 14:00; Semi-Final	Derry	1-11 – 0-11	Kildare	Inniskeen Grattan's GAC, Inniskeen

16 April 2017; 14:00; Semi-Final	Cork B	0-18 – 1-7	Carlow	WIT Sports Campus, Carriganore

30 April 2017; 1:30 p.m. Final	Cork B	2-16 – 1-5	Derry	Coralstown/Kinnegad GAC, Kinnegad; Referee: John Dermody (Westmeath); Man of the Match: Rachel O’Shea (Cork)
30 April 2017; 1:30 p.m. Final	R O’Shea 0-06 (3fs); M McCarthy 0-04; C Sugrue, S Fahy 1-01 each; N McCarthy, K Hickey, F Neville, L Homan 0-01 each	Report	M Hegarty 1-01; K Kielt (fs), A McAllister 0-02 each	Coralstown/Kinnegad GAC, Kinnegad; Referee: John Dermody (Westmeath); Man of the Match: Rachel O’Shea (Cork)

=== Division 3 ===
==== Finals ====
15 April 2017; 2 p.m. Semi-Final	Kerry	0-3 – 0-6	Roscommon	Gort GAA, Gort; Referee: Paul Ryan

16 April 2017; 2 p.m. Semi-Final	Dublin B	1-12 – 0-6	Clare B	Drom-Inch GAA, The Ragg; Referee: Aiden O'Brien

30 April 2017; 3:30 p.m. Final	Roscommon	0-7 – 0-12	Dublin B	Coralstown/Kinnegad GAC, Kinnegad; Referee: Aiden O'Brien (Wexford)
30 April 2017; 3:30 p.m. Final	S Fallon 0-4(2fs); K Hopkins 0-2(fs); N Watson 0-1	Report	L Quinn 0-5(4fs); C Dawson 0-3; A Bugler (1 45), R Drohan 0-2 each	Coralstown/Kinnegad GAC, Kinnegad; Referee: Aiden O'Brien (Wexford)
