= 2025 National Camogie League =

League details
- Dates: 22 February – 13 April 2025
- Teams: 24

League champions
- Winners: Cork (17th win)
- Captain: Meabh Cahalane
- Manager: Ger Manley

League runners-up
- Runners-up: Galway
- Captain: Carrie Dolan
- Manager: Cathal Murray

Other division winners
- Division 1B: Antrim
- Division 2A: Offaly
- Division 3A: Laois

The 2025 National Camogie League, known for sponsorship reasons as the Very Camogie League, was held in spring 2025. It was a secondary competition for camogie county teams in Ireland held in spring prior to the All-Ireland Senior Camogie Championship. Cork were the winners. Compared to the 2024 season intermediate (second-string) teams were not able to play anymore reducing the total number of teams from 36 to 24 teams.

== Format ==
=== League structure ===
The 2025 National Camogie League consists of six divisions:

- Division 1A contains 6 teams
- Division 1B contains 6 teams
- Division 2A contains 6 teams
- Division 3A contains 6 teams

Each team plays every other team in its division once. 3 points are awarded for a win and 1 for a draw.

If two teams are level on points, the tie-break is:

- winners of the head-to-head game are ranked ahead
- if the head-to-head match was a draw, ranking is determined by the points difference (i.e. total scored minus total conceded in all games)
- if the points difference is equal, ranking is determined by the total scored

If three or more teams are level on league points, rankings are determined solely by points difference.

=== Finals and relegation ===
In Division 1A, the top two teams meet in the Camogie League final. The last-placed team is relegated to 1B.

In Division 1B, the top two teams meet in the final, with the division champions promoted. The last-placed team is relegated to Division 2A.

In Division 2A, the top two teams meet in the final, with the division champions promoted to Division 1B. The last-placed team is relegated to Division 3A.

In Division 3A, the top two meet in the final, with the division champions promoted to Division 2A.

== Fixtures and results ==
=== Division 1A ===
Team	Pld	W	D	L	Diff	Pts	Notes
Cork	5	4	0	1	+33	12	Advance to NCL Final
Galway	5	4	0	1	+12	12	Advance to NCL Final
Tipperary	5	2	1	2	0	7
Waterford	5	2	0	3	–2	6
Kilkenny	5	2	0	3	–7	6
Dublin	5	0	1	4	–36	1	Relegation

==== Final ====
13 April 2025 National Camogie League Final	Cork	0-21 (21) – (10) 0-10	Galway	Thurles
14:15 IST (UTC+1)				Venue: Semple Stadium
		Report		Referee: Gavin Donegan (Dublin)

=== Division 1B ===
Team	Pld	W	D	L	Diff	Pts	Notes
Antrim (P)	5	5	0	0	+34	15	Advance to Final
Clare	5	4	0	1	+17	12	Advance to Final
Wexford	5	3	0	2	+43	9
Limerick	5	2	0	3	+1	6
Down	5	1	0	4	–21	3
Westmeath	5	0	0	5	–74	0	Relegation

==== Final ====
31 March 2025 Division 1B Final	Antrim	3-10 (19) – (14) 1-11	Clare	Abbotstown
				Venue: National Games Development Centre
		Report		Referee: Patrick Murphy (Carlow)

=== Division 2A ===
Team	Pld	W	D	L	Diff	Pts	Notes
Offaly	5	5	0	0	+51	15	Advance to Final
Derry	5	4	0	1	+15	12	Advance to Final
Kerry	5	3	0	2	+8	9
Carlow	5	2	0	3	-10	6
Meath	5	1	0	4	-13	3
Armagh	5	0	0	5	-51	0	Relegation

==== Final ====
13 April 2025 Division 2A Final	Offaly	4-13 (25) – (10) 0-10	Derry

=== Division 3A ===
Team	Pld	W	D	L	Diff	Pts	Notes
Laois	5	5	0	0	+82	15	Advance to Final
Roscommon	5	3	1	1	+32	10	Advance to Final
Wicklow	5	3	0	2	+3	9
Tyrone	5	2	0	3	-25	6
Kildare	5	1	1	3	-18	4
Louth	5	0	0	5	-160	0

==== Final ====
12 April 2025 Division 3A Final	Laois	0-14 (14) – (9) 1-6	Roscommon
		Report
