= National Camogie League =

Camogie championship

- Current season or competition: 2026 National Camogie League
- Irish: Sraith Náisiúnta Camógaíochta
- Founded: 1976–1977; 49 years ago
- Region: Ireland (GAA)
- Trophy: AIB Cup
- No. of teams: 36 (2025; includes several junior teams)
- Title holders: Galway (8th title)
- Most titles: Cork (17 titles)
- Sponsors: Centra
- TV partner(s): TG4 and RTÉ Two
- Motto: Style of Play
- Official website: https://camogie.ie/fixtures-results/very-ireland-camogie-leagues/

The National Camogie League, known for sponsorship reasons as the Centra Camogie Leagues, is a competition in the Irish team sport of camogie, played exclusively by women. The competition is held in three divisions graded by ability. It was first played in 1976 for a trophy donated by Allied Irish Banks when Tipperary beat Wexford in a replayed final. Division Two (originally the National Junior League) was inaugurated in 1979 and won by Kildare.

The first two National League competitions started in the autumn and finished in the spring of 1976–77 and 1977–78 respectively. Since then the competition has been completed within the calendar year. The 2001 final was not played until October because of the foot-and-mouth disease outbreak earlier in the year. From 1980 to 2005 the National League was divided into two sections – Senior and Junior. Reserve teams from the leading counties were allowed enter the Junior League after 1982. The current structure with Divisions 1, 2, 3, 4 was introduced in 2006. A one-day blitz competition for fifth tier counties, Division 5, was organised in 2008 and 2009. The second division was known for a period as Division 1B and the third Division was Division 2, they have been reallocated for reasons of consistency in the records below.

The current holders are Galway who defeated Waterford in the 2026 final.

== Roll of honour ==
Team	Wins	Years won	Runner-up	Years runner-up
Cork	17	1984, 1986, 1991, 1992, 1995, 1996, 1997, 1998, 1999, 2000, 2001, 2003, 2006, 2007, 2012, 2013, 2025	11	1977–78, 1981, 1982, 1989, 1993, 2005, 2015, 2017, 2018, 2022, 2023
Kilkenny	15	1978, 1980, 1982, 1985, 1987, 1988, 1989, 1990, 1993, 2008, 2014, 2016, 2017, 2018, 2021	4	1991, 1997, 2010, 2019
Galway	8	1994, 2002, 2005, 2015, 2019, 2022, 2023, 2026	9	1996, 1998, 2001, 2008, 2011, 2016, 2021, 2024, 2025
Wexford	4	1977–78, 2009, 2010, 2011	8	1976–77, 1983, 1990, 1992, 2004, 2007, 2012, 2013
Tipperary	3	1976–77, 2004, 2024	7	1980, 1984, 1999, 2000, 2003, 2006, 2009
Dublin	3	1979, 1981, 1983	5	1984, 1985, 1986, 1987, 1988
Limerick	0		3	1978, 1979, 2002
Armagh	0		1	1995
Waterford	0		1	2026
Clare	0		1	2014

- Tournament unfinished in 2020.

== National Camogie League finals ==
Year	Date	Winner	Score	Runner-up	Score	Venue	Captain
1976–77	Mar 3	Tipperary	2-01	Wexford	2-01	Rathnure	Monica Butler
Replay	Apr 10	Tipperary	4-02	Wexford	1-03	Thurles	Monica Butler
1977–78	Mar 5	Wexford	6-04	Cork	1-02	Castleboro
1978	Nov 12	Kilkenny	2-04	Limerick	1-05	Adare	Mary Fennelly
1979	Nov 18	Dublin	0-06	Limerick	0-00	Russell Park	Anne O'Brien
1980	June 29	Kilkenny	3-08	Tipperary	1-03	Roscrea	Bridie McGarry
1981	June 21	Dublin	1-07	Cork	1-04	Russell Park	Síle Wallace
1982	May 24	Kilkenny	2-05	Cork	1-04	St Johns Park, Kilkenny	Teresa O'Neill
1983	May 22	Dubin	4-08	Wexford	1-06	Russell Park	Barbara Redmond
1984	June 17	Cork	1-08	Dublin	0-04	Ballinlough	Sandie Fitzgibbon
1985	June 2	Kilkenny	4-07	Dublin	2-13	Parnell Park
Replay	June 23	Kilkenny	4-07	Dublin	3-06	Nowlan Park	Bridie McGarry
1986	May 18	Cork	3-08	Dublin	1-10	O'Toole Park	Marian McCarthy
1987	June 7	Kilkenny	4-08	Dublin	1-06	Nowlan Park	Bridie McGarry
1988	June 12	Kilkenny	3-10	Dublin	2-04	O'Toole Park	Angela Downey
1989	June 18	Kilkenny	6-07	Cork	1-11	Nowlan Park	Ann Downey
1990	June 10	Kilkenny	1-10	Wexford	2-04	Enniscorthy	Breda Holmes
1991	June 30	Cork	2-13	Kilkenny	2-08	Ballinlough	Therése O'Callaghan
1992	June 14	Cork	2-17	Wexford	0-11	Enniscorthy	Sandie Fitzgibbon
1993	June 6	Kilkenny	4-07	Cork	1-13	Ballyragget	Marina Downey
1994	June 12	Galway	1-13	Tipperary	1-08	Ballinasloe	Deidre Costello
1995	June 21	Cork	5-16	Armagh	3-04	St Finbarr's	Denise Cronin
1996	June 2	Cork	3-16	Galway	1-07	Páirc Uí Rinn	Therése O'Callaghan
1997	June 8	Cork	4-12	Kilkenny	0-09	Páirc Uí Rinn	Linda Mellerick
1998	June 1	Cork	1-16	Galway	2-09	Ballinasloe	Eithne Duggan
1999	May 22	Cork	9-19	Tipperary	2-04	Thurles	Vivienne Harris
2000	May 20	Cork	3-07	Tipperary	1-10	Tullamore	Vivienne Harris
2001	Oct 27	Cork	6-09	Galway	0-11	Nenagh	Vivienne Harris
2002	May 24	Galway	4-09	Limerick	1-09	Tullamore	Louise Curry
2003	May 11	Cork	3-10	Tipperary	1-12	Páirc Uí Rinn	Stephanie Delea
2004	May 22	Tipperary	3-10	Wexford	2-09	Nowlan Park	Joanne Ryan
2005	May 29	Galway	1-06	Cork	0-06	Thurles	Therese Maher
2006	May 14	Cork	2-07	Tipperary	2-05	Thurles	Joanne O'Callaghan
2007	May 6	Cork	3-08	Wexford	2-10	Nowlan Park	Gemma O'Connor
2008	Apr 26	Kilkenny	3-11	Galway	0-17	Nowlan Park	Marie Connor
2009	Apr 25	Wexford	2-12	Tipperary	0-11	Parnell Park	Aoife O'Connor
2010	Apr 24	Wexford	1-07	Kilkenny	1-06	Thurles	Una Leacy
2011	Apr 17	Wexford	3-10	Galway	0-10	Thurles	Ursula Jacob
2012	May 6	Cork	1-08	Wexford	0-09	Thurles	Julia White
2013	May 5	Cork	0-12	Wexford	1-07	Nowlan Park	Anna Geary
2014	May 4	Kilkenny	1-15	Clare	0-04	Thurles	Leann Fennelly
2015	May 3	Galway	2-15	Cork	2-12	Thurles	Niamh Kilkenny
2016	May 1	Kilkenny	2-07	Galway	0-07	Thurles	Michelle Quilty
2017	April 23	Kilkenny	2-07	Cork	0-10	Limerick	Meighan Farrell
2018	April 8	Kilkenny	0-15	Cork	1-11	Kilkenny	Shelly Farrell
2019	March 31	Galway	0-16	Kilkenny	2-08	Croke Park	Sarah Dervan
2020		Unfinished due to COVID-19
2021	June 20	Kilkenny	1-18	Galway	1-15	Croke Park	Meighan Farrell
2022	April 9	Galway	2-14	Cork	1-13	Croke Park	Sarah Dervan
2023	April 16	Galway	2-13	Cork	1-12	Croke Park	Shauna Healy
2024	April 14	Tipperary	1-13	Galway	0-15	Croke Park	Karen Kennedy
2025	April 13	Cork	0-21	Galway	0-10	Semple Stadium	Meabh Cahalane
2026	April 12	Galway	0-13	Waterford	0-11	Nowlan Park	Carrie Dolan

== Lower division finals ==
=== Division IB ===
- 2023 Waterford 1-22 Wexford 1-06
- 2024 Dublin 2-10 Wexford 2-08
- 2025 Antrim 3-10 Clare 1-11
- 2026 Clare

=== Junior National League / Division 2 ===
Dublin All-Ireland medal-holder, Eileen Bourke presented Corn de Búrca for the Junior National League in memory of her sister, Joan who served as secretary of Leinster Colleges Council.

- 1980 Armagh 2-05 Kildare 2-03
- 1981 Cavan 2-04 Louth 1-07
- Replay Cavan 0-04 Louth 0-02
- 1982 Dublin 6-09 Tyrone 0-02
- 1983 Dublin 3-09 Westmeath 2-05
- 1984 Dublin 2-04 Armagh 1-03
- 1985 Galway 3-10 Kildare 3-03
- 1986 Kildare 2-03 Dublin 1-04
- 1987 Dublin 6-04 Kildare 1-07
- 1988 Armagh 1-09 Down 0-06
- 1989 Kildare 2-14 Armagh 3-08
- 1990 Kildare 2-13 Kilkenny 1-03
- 1991 Limerick 3-13 Roscommon 3-04
- 1992 Limerick 4-13 Down 2-06
- 1993 Armagh 3-08 Dublin 2-01
- 1994 Armagh 1-18 Cork 1-02
- 1995 Galway 4-13 Down 2-09
- 1996 Limerick 5-10 Down 3-07
- 1997 Antrim 5-12 Down 3-16
- 1998 Down 0-20 Cork 0-12
- 1999 Derry 3-07 Wexford 0-07
- 2000 Cork 3-09 Laois 1-05
- 2001 Cork 3-14 Derry 4-03
- 2002 Offaly 3-18 Laois 2-6
- 2003 Galway 2-10 Armagh 1-08
- 2004 Kildare 2-11 Laois 2-06
- 2005 Cork 2-10 Galway 2-07
- 2006 Kilkenny 2-08 Dublin 2-07
- 2007 Limerick 1-14 Cork 0-05
- 2008 Clare 4-08 Derry 3-09
- 2009 Wexford 2-09 Antrim 0-11
- 2010 Wexford 2-09 Offaly 1-09
- 2011 Waterford 0-16 Antrim 2-09
- 2012 Derry 2-11 Meath 0-06
- 2013 Limerick 3-14 Kildare 0-10
- 2014 Cork 2-12 Down 2-06
- 2015 Waterford 3-10 Laois 2-05
- 2016 Meath 1-10 Galway 2-03
- 2017 Cork "B" 2-16 Derry 1-05
- 2018 Cork "B" 0-08 Westmeath 1-04
- 2019 Tipperary 0-14 Kilkenny 0-08
- 2020 Abandoned
- 2021 Down 3-08 Antrim 1-11
- 2022 Wexford 3-12 Antrim 0-14
- 2023 Kerry 0-14 Meath 0-13
- 2024 Westmeath 4-08 Derry 0-16
- 2025 Offaly 4-13 Derry 0-10
- 2026

=== Division 3 ===
- 2006 Clare 1-14 Derry 3-07
- 2007 Waterford 1-18 Down 2-13
- 2008 Antrim 1-10 Offaly 1-10
- Replay Antrim 6-11 Offaly 3-07
- 2009 Down 0-15 Laois 2-08
- 2010 Laois 2-10 Meath 2-05
- 2011 Meath 3-09 Kildare 2-11
- 2012 Kildare 1-08 Armagh 0-10
- 2013 Laois 0-09 Dublin 0-07
- 2014 Westmeath beat Dublin
- 2015 Carlow 0-12 Dublin 1-07
- 2016 Armagh 3-11 Roscommon 2-09
- 2017 Dublin "B" 0-12 Roscommon 0-07
- 2018Kerry 2-08 Roscommon 0-04
- 2019 Kildare 2-09 Limerick 0-11
- 2020 Abandoned
- 2021 Wexford 0-13 Armagh 1-08
- 2022 Cavan 2-05 Wexford 0-09
- 2023 Carlow 0-08 Armagh 0-07
- 2024 Armagh 0-14 Laois 2-07
- 2025 Laois 0-14 Roscommon 1-06

=== Division 4 ===
- 2008 Meath 5-07 Roscommon 1-05
- 2009 Kildare 3-07 Westmeath 1-10
- 2010 Tyrone 3-12 Westmeath 1-09
- 2011 Westmeath 4-06 Cavan 2-07
- 2012 Dublin 1-06 Carlow 0-05
- 2013 Carlow 2-06 Tyrone 2-04
- 2014 Limerick
- 2015Kerry 1-12 Meath 1-04
- 2021 Cavan 3-16 Roscommon 0-07
- 2022 Mayo 2-14 Wicklow 1-06
- 2023 Tyrone 0-18 Mayo 2-09
- 2024 Tyrone 3-16 Wicklow 0-10

=== Division 5 ===
Division 5 was run as a one-day blitz competition. It was discontinued in 2010 with the introduction of a championship structure for the All Ireland Junior B grade (Máire Ní Chinnéide Cup).

- 2006 Monaghan
- 2007 Monaghan
- 2008 Tyrone 2-04 Cavan 1-03
- 2009 Wicklow 2-07 Monaghan 1-01
