= 2023 National Camogie League =

Gaelic games competition in Ireland

League details
- Dates: 18 February – 16 April 2023
- Teams: 36

League champions
- Winners: Galway (7th win)
- Captain: Shauna Healy
- Manager: Cathal Murray

League runners-up
- Runners-up: Cork
- Captain: Amy O'Connor
- Manager: Matthew Twomey

Other division winners
- Division 1B: Waterford
- Division 2A: Kerry
- Division 3A: Carlow
- Division 3B: Clare
- Division 4: Tyrone

The 2023 National Camogie League, known for sponsorship reasons as the Very Ireland Camogie Leagues, was held in Ireland in spring 2023. It is a secondary competition for camogie county teams, as well as some intermediate (second-string) county teams, held in spring prior to the All-Ireland Senior Camogie Championship. Galway were the winners, defeating Cork in the final.

== Format ==
=== League structure ===
The 2023 National Camogie League consisted of six divisions:

- Division 1A contains 6 teams
- Division 1B contains 6 teams
- Division 2A contains 6 teams
- Division 3A contains 8 teams, divided into two groups of 4
- Division 2B contains 5 "second teams"
- Division 3B contains 5 "second teams"

Each team plays every other team in its division once, except in 3A where teams only play the teams in their own group. 3 points are awarded for a win and 1 for a draw.

If two teams are level on points, the tie-break is:

- winners of the head-to-head game are ranked ahead
- if the head-to-head match was a draw, ranking is determined by the points difference (i.e. total scored minus total conceded in all games)
- if the points difference is equal, ranking is determined by the total scored

If three or more teams are level on league points, rankings are determined solely by points difference.

=== Finals and relegation ===
In Division 1A, the top two teams meet in the Camogie League final. The last-placed team is relegated.

In Division 1B, the top two teams meet in the final, with the division champions promoted. The last-placed team is relegated to Division 2A.

In Division 2A, the top two teams meet in the final, with the division champions promoted to Division 1B. The last-placed team is relegated to Division 3A.

In Division 3A, the top two in each group meet in the semi-finals, with the division champions promoted to Division 2A. The bottom two in each group meet in the "Division 4" semi-finals and final, with no promotion.

In Division 2B, the top two teams meet in the final, with no promotion. The last-placed team is relegated to Division 3B.

In Division 3B, the top two teams meet in the final, with the division champions promoted to 2B.

== Division 1 ==
=== Division 1A ===
Team	Pld	W	D	L	Diff	Pts	Notes
Cork	5	4	0	1	+44	12	Advance to NCL Final
Galway (C)	5	4	0	1	+8	12	Advance to NCL Final
Tipperary	5	3	0	2	+32	9
Kilkenny	5	2	0	3	–9	6
Clare	5	1	1	3	–30	4
Dublin	5	0	1	4	–45	1	Relegation

==== Final ====
16 April 2023 National Camogie League Final	Galway	2-13 (19) – (15) 1-12	Cork	Dublin
13:50 IST (UTC+1)		(HT: 1-06 – 1-08)		Venue: Croke Park
		Report		Referee: Justin Heffernan

=== Division 1B ===
Team	Pld	W	D	L	Diff	Pts	Notes
Waterford (P)	5	5	0	0	75	15	Advance to Final
Wexford	5	4	0	1	22	12	Advance to Final
Antrim	5	2	1	2	16	7
Down	5	2	0	3	-30	6
Limerick	5	1	0	4	-40	3
Offaly	5	0	1	4	-43	1	Relegation

==== Final ====
9 April 2023 Division 1B Final	Waterford	1-22 (25) – (9) 1-06	Wexford	Thurles
12:00 IST (UTC+1)		(HT: 1-12 – 1-03)		Venue: Semple Stadium
		Report		Referee: Barry Nea
