= 1980 National Camogie League =

Camogie tournament

National Camogie League 1980
Winners
- Champions: Kilkenny (2nd title)
- Captain: Bridie McGarry

Runners-up
- Runners-up: Tipperary

The 1980 National Camogie League is a competition in the women's team field sport of camogie was won by Kilkenny, who defeated Tipperary in the final, played at Roscrea.

== Arrangements ==
Kilkenny defeated Limerick, Cork and Galway en route to the final. Tipperary defeated Clare, Down and Wexford by 3–9 to 2–7. Tipperary then defeated Dublin in the semi-final while Kilkenny had a bye to the final. Barbra Redmond was missing from the Dublin team for the League semi-final, the second yearthat a league semi-final involving Dublin went to extra time.

== The Final ==
Both sides were without their first choice goalkeepers for the final, Mary O'Brien a student at Thomond College having gone to America and Teresa O'Neill on holiday in America. As a contest the final was over early in the second half when Kilkenny led by 3–4 to 0–1, thanks to two goals from Angea Downey and one from Mary Purcell, Tipperary's only point coming from a placed ball from a thirty. Agnes Hourigan, president of the Camogie Association, wrote in the Irish Press:

From the longest serving members to Anne Whelan from Castlecomer, who was playing in her first final, Kilkenny proved themselves skilled, fast and celevr exponents of the game. Tipperary, who had promised so much in their game with Dublin in the semi-final, did not live up to that performance and must feel very disappointed with how they played.

== Division 2 ==
The Junior National League, known since 2006 as Division Two, was won by Armagh who defeated Kildare in the final.

=== Final stages ===
October 21
Semi-Final

| Tipperary | 3-12 – 2-12 after extra time | Dublin |

Russell Park

June 29
Final

| Kilkenny | 3-8 – 1-3 | Tipperary |

Roscrea

| Kilkenny | Tipperary |

Kilkenny:
| GK | 1 | Bridia Martin (St Paul's) |
| FB | 2 | Ann Downey (St Paul's) |
| RWB | 3 | Mary Holden (Ballyhale Shamrocks) |
| CB | 4 | Bridie Martin (St Paul's) |
| LWB | 5 | Mary Canavany |
| MF | 6 | Helena O'Neill (St Paul's) |
| MF | 7 | Peggy Muldowny (Gowran) |
| MF | 8 | Mary Fennelly (Ballyhale Shamrocks) |
| RWF | 9 | Mary Purcell 1-1 |
| CF | 10 | Angela Downey (St Paul's) 2-4 |
| LWF | 11 | Anne Whelan (Castlecomer) 0-3 |
| FF | 12 | Jo Dunne (Carrickshock) |

Tipperary:
| GK | 1 | Breda Kennedy |
| FB | 2 | Monica Butler |
| RWB | 3 | Maura Hackett |
| CB | 4 | Siobhan O'Donnell] |
| LWB | 5 | Rose Ryan |
| MF | 6 | Agnes Brophy |
| MF | 7 | Deidre Lane 0-3 |
| MF | 8 | Brenie O'Carroll |
| RWF | 9 | Mona Quigley |
| CF | 10 | Sheila Delaney |
| LWF | 11 | Maolmuire Tynan |
| FF | 12 | Mary Griffin |
Substitutes:
| RWB | | Ann Gleeson |

| Preceded by National Camogie League 1979 | National Camogie League; 1977 – present | Succeeded by National Camogie League 1981 |
