= 1976–77 National Camogie League =

Camogie tournament

National Camogie League 1977
Tournament details
- Date: 8 September-20 March
- Teams: 6

Winners
- Champions: Tipperary (1st title)
- Captain: Monica Butler

Runners-up
- Runners-up: Wexford
- Captain: Margaret Lacy

Other
- Matches played: 10

The 1977 National Camogie League was the first to be played in the sport of camogie. It was won by Tipperary who defeated Wexford in a replayed final and became first holders of the AIB Cup, which Eddie Keher presented to Monica Butler. Helena O'Neill refereed.

== Structure ==
Matches commenced in September 1976. Antrim, Dublin, Kilkenny, and Wexford competed in the eastern zone, which was won with Wexford after play-off victories over Dublin and Kilkenny. Tipperary beat Galway 2–3 to 1–4 to win the Western Zone.

== Final ==
The first National League final was staged on a fresh day in Rathnure. Each team scored a goal and a point in the first half, Kit Codd and Eileen O’Gorman for Wexford and Deirdre Lane for Tipperary. Monica Butler at full back for Tipperary, according to The Nenagh Guardian:

“gave an incredible display tirelessly repulsing attack after attack from the sharp-striking Wexford forwards and even when suffering from a painful shoulder injury insisted on staying on to lead her team to fight another day.

Eileen Kehoe scored a goal for Wexford early in the second half and ten minutes from the end Maol Muire Tynan gathered the ball at midfield and set off n a solo run that ended with a memorable goal from an acute angle.

== Replay ==
The replay took place at Semple stadium, with the Upperchurch–Drombane youth band leading the pre match parade. Maol Muire Tynan scored a goal after just 20 seconds, setting the pattern for the game as a confident Tipperary side, despite playing into the breeze kept their rivals under pressure. They had a second goal from Maura Hogan but Wexford kept their hopes alive when Kit Codd scored a goal just before half time. Maol Muire Tynan scored another quick Tipperary goal at the start of the second half and the issue was put beyond doubt shortly afterwards when Deidre Lane scored Tipperary's fourth goal. The Nenagh Guardian reported:

On the day Tipperary were the better side, using the bal intelligently and generally showing greater earnestness in their endeavours.

== Aftermath ==
Maol Muire Tynan later became a journalist with the Sunday Press and Sunday Business Post. Liz Howard later went on to become president of the Camogie Association.

=== Final stages ===
March 6
Final

| Tipperary | 2-1 – 2-1 | Wexford |

Rathnure

April 10
Replay

| Tipperary | 4-2 – 1–3 | Wexford |

Semple Stadium, Thurles

=== Draw March 6 Tipperary 2–1 Wexford 2–1 ===
| Tipperary | Wexford |

TIPPERARY:
| GK | 1 | Noelle Harkin (Drom-Inch) |
| FB | 2 | Monica Butler (Drom-Inch) (Captain) |
| RWB | 3 | Mary O'Brien (Portroe) |
| CB | 4 | Patrica Quigley (St Mary's Newport–Kilcommon) |
| LWB | 5 | Siobhan Tynan (Drom-Inch) |
| MF | 6 | Brenie Feehan (St Bernadette's Roscrea) |
| MF | 7 | Deidre Lane (Celtic) & (Lorrha) 1–1 |
| MF | 8 | Marion Troy (Celtic) |
| RWF | 9 | Maol Muire Tynan (Drom-Inch) 1–0 |
| CF | 10 | Maire Horgan (Portroe) |
| LWF | 11 | Geraldine Feehan (St Bernadette's Roscrea) |
| FF | 12 | Jose Quigley (St Mary's Newport–Kilcommon) |
Substitutes:
| MF | | Kathleen Tynan (Drom-Inch) for Feehan (substituted in) 40' (substituted off) 58' |

WEXFORD:
| GK | 1 | Kathleen Tonk (Buffers Alley) |
| FB | 2 | Margaret Lacy (Buffers Alley) |
| RWB | 3 | Martine Cousins (St Brigid's Kilrush) |
| CB | 4 | Brigit Doyle (Buffers Alley) |
| LWB | 5 | Dorothy Walshe (Buffers Alley) |
| MF | 6 | Brenda Murphy (Cloughbawn–Adamstown) |
| MF | 7 | Elsa Walsh (Buffers Alley) |
| MF | 8 | Geraldine Duggan (Buffers Alley) |
| RWF | 9 | Kit Codd (Cloughbawn–Adamstown) |
| CF | 10 | Anna Kennedy (Buffers Alley) |
| LWF | 11 | Ellen Kehoe (Cloughbawn–Adamstown) |
| FF | 12 | Ellen Gorman (Buffers Alley) |

MATCH RULES

- 50 minutes
- Replay if scores level
- Maximum of 5 substitutions

=== Replay March 20 Tipperary 4–2 Wexford 1–3 ===
| Tipperary | Wexford |

TIPPERARY:
| GK | 1 | Nuala Bonner (Cashel) |
| FB | 2 | Monica Butler (Drom & Inch) (Captain) |
| RWB | 3 | Mary O'Brien (Portroe) |
| CB | 4 | Siobhan Tynan (Drom & Inch) |
| LWB | 5 | Brenie Feehan (St Bernadette's) |
| MF | 6 | Deidre Lane (Celtic) 1–1 |
| MF | 7 | Marion Troy (Celtic) |
| MF | 8 | Kathleen Tynan (Drom & Inch) |
| RWF | 9 | Maol Muire Tynan (Drom & Inch) 2–1 |
| CF | 10 | Maire Horgan (Portroe) 1–0 |
| LWF | 11 | Liz Howard (Drom & Inch) (substituted off) 40' (substituted in) 45' |
| FF | 12 | Jose Quigley (St Mary's) |
Substitutes:
| LWF | | Mary Kelley (Drom & Inch) for Liz Howard (substituted in) 40' |

WEXFORD:
| GK | 1 | Kathleen Tonk (Buffers Alley) |
| FB | 2 | Margaret Lacy (Buffers Alley) |
| RWB | 3 | Dorothy Walshe (Buffers Alley) |
| CB | 4 | Brigit Doyle (Buffers Alley) |
| LWB | 5 | Martine Cousins (St Brigid's Kilrush) |
| MF | 6 | Brenda Murphy (Cloughbawn–Adamstown) (substituted off) 45' |
| MF | 7 | Elsa Walsh (Buffers Alley) |
| MF | 8 | Geraldine Duggan (Buffers Alley) |
| RWF | 9 | Kit Codd (Cloughbawn–Adamstown) 1–0 |
| CF | 10 | Anna Kennedy (Buffers Alley) (substituted off) 40' |
| LWF | 11 | Ellen Kehoe (Buffers Alley) |
| FF | 12 | Ellen Gorman (Buffers Alley) 0–1 |
Substitutes:
| CF | | Margaret Hearn (Buffers Alley) 0–2 for Kennedy (substituted in) 40' |
| MF | | Bride Murphy (St Brigid's Kilrush) for Breda Murphy (substituted in) 45' |

MATCH RULES

- 60 minutes
- Replay if scores level
- Maximum of 5 substitutions

| Preceded by - | National Camogie League; 1977 – present | Succeeded by National Camogie League 1978 |
