= 2015 National Camogie League =

Camogie tournament

League details
- Dates: February – 3 May 2015

League champions
- Winners: Galway (4th win)
- Captain: Niamh Kilkenny

League runners-up
- Runners-up: Cork
- Captain: Ashling Thompson

The 2015 National Camogie League, known for sponsorship reasons as the Irish Daily Star National Camogie League, commenced in February 2015 and was won by Galway.
