= Sinéad Millea =

Irish camogie player

Personal information
- Native name: Sinéad Níc Amhalgaidh (Irish)
- Born: Kilkenny, Ireland

Sport
- Sport: Camogie
- Position: Left corner forward
Clubs
- Years: Club
- St Brigid’s Ballycallan and Cashel
Inter-county
- Years: County
- 1991-2008: Kilkenny
Inter-county titles
- All-Irelands: 2
- All Stars: 1

Sinéad Millea (born in Kilkenny) is a former camogie player for Kilkenny, winner of an All-Star award in 2004 and two All Ireland medals. She was honoured by inclusion in the University of Limericks' Sports Hall of Fame in 2013.

== Family background ==
Her father Joe was a member of the Kilkenny team that won the Liam MacCarthy Cup in 1969. Sinéad went to school at St Brigid's in Callan. Her sister is Tracey Millea.

== Career ==
She played club camogie in Tipperary and Kilkenny, won three All-Ireland Minor titles with Kilkenny and helped her county to the Senior title in 1991 and 1994. She played on the University of Limerick team that won their first Ashbourne Cup in 1995.

Notable sporting achievements include; 2 Senior All-Irelands, 2 National Leagues, 3 Minor All-Irelands, 1 Junior Colleges All-Ireland, 1 Senior Colleges All-Ireland, 1 Ashbourne Cup medal, 1 Ashbourne Shield medal, 7 Leinster Senior Championships, County Championship medals at all levels.

=== Honours ===
- All Ireland Senior Camogie Championship (2)
  - 1991, 1994
- National Camogie League (2)
  - 1993, 2008
- All-Ireland Minor Camogie Championship (3)
  - 1988, 1989, 1991
- All Ireland Colleges Camogie Championship (2)
  - Junior 1990
  - Senior 1993
- Ashbourne Cup (1)
  - 1995
- Leinster Senior Camogie Championship (7)

== See also ==
- Camogie All Stars Awards
- All-Ireland Senior Camogie Championship
- National Camogie League
- Ashbourne Cup
- Wikipedia List of Camogie players
