= 2024 National Camogie League =

League details
- Dates: February – 14 April, 2024
- Teams: 36

League champions
- Winners: Tipperary (3rd win)
- Captain: Karen Kennedy
- Manager: Denis Kelly

League runners-up
- Runners-up: Galway
- Captain: Róisín Black
- Manager: Cathal Murray

Other division winners
- Division 1B: Dublin
- Division 2A: Westmeath
- Division 2B: Cork
- Division 3A: Armagh
- Division 3B: Dublin
- Division 4: Tyrone

The 2024 National Camogie League, known for sponsorship reasons as the Very Camogie League, was held in spring 2024. It is a secondary competition for camogie county teams in Ireland, as well as some intermediate (second-string) county teams, held in spring prior to the All-Ireland Senior Camogie Championship.

Tipperary were the winners after beating Galway in the final.

== Format ==
=== League structure ===
The 2024 National Camogie League consists of six divisions:

- Division 1A contains 6 teams
- Division 1B contains 6 teams
- Division 2A contains 6 teams
- Division 3A contains 8 teams, divided into two groups of 4
- Division 3B contains 5 teams

Each team plays every other team in its division once, except in 3A where teams only play the teams in their own group. 3 points are awarded for a win and 1 for a draw.

If two teams are level on points, the tie-break is:

- winners of the head-to-head game are ranked ahead
- if the head-to-head match was a draw, ranking is determined by the points difference (i.e. total scored minus total conceded in all games)
- if the points difference is equal, ranking is determined by the total scored

If three or more teams are level on league points, rankings are determined solely by points difference.

=== Finals and relegation ===
In Division 1A, the top two teams meet in the Camogie League final. The last-placed team is relegated to 1B.

In Division 1B, the top two teams meet in the final, with the division champions promoted. The last-placed team is relegated to Division 2A.

In Division 2A, the top two teams meet in the final, with the division champions promoted to Division 1B. The last-placed team is relegated to Division 3A.

In Division 3A, the top two in each group meet in the semi-finals, with the division champions promoted to Division 2A. The bottom two in each group meet in the "Division 4" semi-finals and final, with no promotion.

In Division 2B, the top two teams meet in the final, with no promotion. The last-placed team is relegated to Division 3B.

In Division 3B, the top two teams meet in the final, with the division champions promoted to 2B.

== Fixtures and results ==
=== Division 1A ===
Team	Pld	W	D	L	Diff	Pts	Notes
Tipperary (C)	5	4	0	1	+36	12	Advance to NCL Final
Galway	5	4	0	1	+18	12	Advance to NCL Final
Cork	5	3	0	2	+5	9
Waterford	5	2	0	3	+10	6
Kilkenny	5	2	0	3	-3	6
Clare	5	0	0	5	-66	0	Relegation

==== Final ====
14 April 2024 National Camogie League Final	Tipperary	1-13 (16) – (15) 0-15	Galway	Dublin
14:30 IST (UTC+1)				Venue: Croke Park
		Report		Referee: Aaron Hogg

=== Division 1B ===
Team	Pld	W	D	L	Diff	Pts	Notes
Wexford	5	4	0	1	+90	12	Advance to Final
Dublin (P)	5	4	0	1	+43	12	Advance to Final
Limerick	5	3	0	2	+33	9
Antrim	5	3	0	2	+37	9
Down	5	0	1	4	-59	1
Kerry	5	0	1	4	-70	1	Relegation

==== Final ====
13 April 2024 Division 1B Final	Wexford	2-08 (14) – (16) 2-10	Dublin	Carlow
				Venue: South East Technological University
		Report
