= 2012 National Camogie League =

Camogie tournament

League details
- Dates: February – 6 May 2012

League champions
- Winners: Cork (15th win)
- Captain: Julia White

League runners-up
- Runners-up: Wexford
- Captain: Ursula Jacob

The 2012 National Camogie League, known for sponsorship reasons as the Irish Daily Star National Camogie League, commenced in February 2012 and was won by Cork.
