= 1978 National Camogie League =

Camogie tournament

National Camogie League 1978
Winners
- Champions: Kilkenny (1st title)
- Captain: Mary Fennelly

Runners-up
- Runners-up: Limerick

The 1978 National Camogie League is a competition in the women's team field sport of camogie was won by Kilkenny, who defeated Limerick in the final, played at Adare.

== Arrangements ==
Kilkenny, the 1977 senior champions, defeated Antrim, Down, Dublin and Wexford en route to the final while Limerick the 1977 All-Ireland junior champions, defeated Clare, Cork, Galway and Tipperary.

== Final ==
Kilkenny led 1–2 to 0–3 at half–time and responded to an equalising goal by Pauline McCarthy to eventually win a keenly contested final between two well matched sides. Marion Doyle’s point at the very end reduced the margin to two points. Agnes Hourigan, who was then president of the Camogie Association, wrote in the Irish Press:

This was a game that Limerick could have won had they taken their chances. They had three good scoring opportunities in the first half and muffed a 15-yards free in the closing stages. The winner’s experience was the vital difference between the two sides. Helena O'Neill, now Mrs McCormack, interrupted her honeymoon to take part in the final and played a vital role in her side’s victory, scoring all four point. The winners’ success was all the more meritorious as they had to field without two of their star players Liz Neary and Angela Downey.

The O'Brien sisters’ brother Jim was an All-Ireland hurler while Vera Mackey also came from a hurling family.

=== Final stages ===
November 12
Final

Kilkenny	2-4 – 1-5	Limerick
Helena O'Neill 0-4; Ann Downey 1-0, Peg Muldowney 1-0		Pauline McCarthy 1-0; Brid Stokes 0-2, Marian Doyle 0-1. Helen Mulcair 0-1. Carrie Clancy 0-1.

Adare
Attendance: 2,000
Referee: Mary Cribben (Kildare)

Kilkenny	Limerick

Kilkenny:
GK	1	Teresa O'Neill (St Paul’s)
FB	2	Ann Downey (St Paul’s)1-0
RWB	3	Mary Holden (Ballyhale Shamrocks)
CB	4	Bridie Martin (St Paul’s)
LWB	5	Mary Canavan (St Paul’s)
MF	6	Helena O'Neill (St Paul’s)0-4
MF	7	Peggy Muldowney (Gowran) 1-0 (substituted off) 43'
MF	8	Mary Fennelly (St Paul’s)
RWF	9	Mary Purcell
CF	10	Carmel Doyle (St Paul’s)
LWF	11	Margaret Farrell (UCD)
FF	12	Jo Dunne (Carrickshock)
Substitutes:
MF		Kay Dowling for Muldowney (substituted in) 43'

Limerick:
GK	1	Helen Butler (Ballyagrsn)
FB	2	Marjorie Neville (Croagh-Kilfinny)
RWB	3	Bernadette O'Brien (Ballyagran)
CB	4	Geraldine O'Brien (Ballyagran)
LWB	5	Liz Hayes (Ballyagran)
MF	6	Anne O'Sullivan (substituted off) Half time'
MF	7	Helen Mulcair (Croagh-Kilfinny)
MF	8	Pauline McCarthy
RWF	9	Breda Darcy
CF	10	Carrie Clancy (Ahane)
LWF	11	Vera Fitzpatrick
FF	12	Breda Stokes (Croagh-Kilfinny)
Substitutes:
MF		Marian Doyle for Anne O'Sullivan (substituted in) Half time'

Preceded by National Camogie League 1977	National Camogie League; 1977 – present	Succeeded by National Camogie League 1979
