= Sarah Dervan =

Galway Camogie player

Personal information
- Born: 1988 (age 37–38) Galway, Ireland

Sport
- Sport: Camogie
- Position: Full back
Club
- Years: Club
- Mullagh
Inter-county
- Years: County
- Galway
Inter-county titles
- All-Irelands: 3
- All Stars: 7

Sarah Dervan (born 1988) is a camogie player, All-Ireland winning medalist 2013, 2019 and 2021. She was also a member of the Galway senior panel that unsuccessfully contested the All Ireland finals of 2010 and 2011 against Wexford.

== Other awards ==
All Ireland Senior Camogie championship with Galway 2013, Senior County title with club Mullagh 2014, All Star Award winner four years in succession 2013, 2014, 2015 and 2016. Connacht Player of the Year 2010, All Ireland Intermediate medal 2009, Senior Gael Linn Cup 2008, All Ireland Féile Skills 2001. Ashbourne cup winner.
