= Yvonne Redmond =

Irish camogie player

Personal information
- Native name: Úna Ní Réamoinn (Irish)
- Born: Dublin, Ireland

Sport
- Sport: Camogie
- Position: Goalkeeper
Club*
Years	Club	Apps (scores)
	Crumlin	?
Inter-county**
Years	County	Apps (scores)
1980-1987	Dublin	?
Inter-county titles
- All-Irelands: 1
- * club appearances and scores correct as of (16:31, 30 June 2010 (UTC)). **Inter County team apps and scores correct as of (16:31, 30 June 2010 (UTC)).

Yvonne Redmond is a camogie player, winner of the B+I Star of the Year award and an All Ireland medal with Dublin in 1984.

== Family background ==
She was one of four sisters who played together for Crumlin, winning All Ireland club honours in 1985, and Dublin, winning All Ireland and National League honours, Yvonne in goal, Ann at full-back, Barbara at midfield, and Aileen. Two members of the family went on to referee the All Ireland senior final, Anne in 1987 and Aileen in 2002. Aileen became president elect of the Camogie Association in 2011

== Colleges ==
She attended Queen's University Belfast and was one of the team which inflicted the historic defeat of UCG, which allowed Queens into their first ever Ashbourne Cup final in 1984.
