= Therése O'Callaghan =

Irish camogie player

Personal information
- Native name: Treasa Ní Cheallacháin (Irish)
- Born: Cork, Ireland

Sport
- Sport: Camogie
- Position: centre back
Club*
Years	Club	Apps (scores)
	Glen Rovers	?
Inter-county**
Years	County	Apps (scores)
	Cork	?
Inter-county titles
- All-Irelands: 3
- * club appearances and scores correct as of (16:31, 30 June 2010 (UTC)). **Inter County team apps and scores correct as of (16:31, 30 June 2010 (UTC)).

Therése O'Callaghan is a camogie player, captain of the winning National Camogie League team in 1991 and again in 1996. She also captained her club Glen Rovers to the All Ireland club championship of 1990.

== Career ==
She won All Ireland medals in 1992, 1993 and 1995 and Gael Linn Cup inter-provincial medals with Munster in 1990 and 1992. She retired after playing in the last of her eight All Ireland finals with a heavily strapped Achilles tendon injury in 1996. After her retirement she served as Public Relations officer for the Camogie Association and on the advisory committee on the proposed merger between the Camogie Association and Gaelic Athletic Association.
