= Eithne Duggan =

Camogie player

Personal information
- Native name: Eithne Ní Dhuagáin (Irish)
- Born: County Cork, Ireland

Sport
- Sport: Camogie
Club*
Years	Club	Apps (scores)
	Bishopstown	?
Inter-county**
Years	County	Apps (scores)
1994-2000	Cork	?
- * club appearances and scores correct as of (16:31, 30 June 2010 (UTC)). **Inter County team apps and scores correct as of (16:31, 30 June 2010 (UTC)).

Eithne Duggan is a former camogie player, captain of the All Ireland Camogie Championship winning team in 1998.

== Career ==
She came to prominence with the Bishopstown team that won Cork Senior B honours in 1994 and won All Ireland senior medals in 1995, 1997 1998 and 2002
