= Marina Downey =

Personal information
- Native name: Marina Nic Giolla Domhnaigh (Irish)
- Born: Lisdowney, Ireland

Sport
- Sport: Camogie
- Position: centre field, forward
Clubs
- Years: Club
- Lisdowney Camogie Club and Lisdowney
Inter-county
- Years: County
- Kilkenny
Inter-county titles
- All-Irelands: 5

Marina Downey is a camogie player, winner of five All Ireland medals and captain of the Kilkenny team that won the National Camogie League in 1993. Enjoyed success at club level when she played on the Lisdowney team that won the club championship in 1994.

== Career ==
She joined the Kilkenny team in 1988 and won four All Ireland medals in succession by 1991, adding a fifth in 1994. She played her last All Ireland final in 2001.
