= Biddy O'Sullivan =

Irish camogie player

Personal information
- Native name: Bríd Ní Shúilleabháin (Irish)
- Born: Kilkenny, Ireland

Sport
- Sport: Camogie
- Position: Full back
Club*
Years	Club	Apps (scores)
	Tullogher-Rosbercon	?
Inter-county**
Years	County	Apps (scores)
	Kilkenny	?
Inter-county titles
- All-Irelands: 8
- * club appearances and scores correct as of (16:31, 30 June 2010 (UTC)). **Inter County team apps and scores correct as of (16:31, 30 June 2010 (UTC)).

Brigid 'Biddy' O'Sullivan is a former camogie player; winner of the B+I Star of the Year award in 1988 and of eight All Ireland medals with Kilkenny.
