= Offaly GAA =

County board of the Gaelic Athletic Association in Ireland

- Irish: Uíbh Fhailí
- Nickname(s): The Faithful
- Province: Leinster
- Dominant sport: Hurling
- Ground(s): O'Connor Park, Tullamore; St Brendan's Park, Birr
- County colours: Green White Gold

County teams
- NFL: Division 2
- NHL: Division 1A
- Football Championship: Sam Maguire Cup
- Hurling Championship: Liam MacCarthy Cup

The Offaly County Board of the Gaelic Athletic Association (GAA) (Irish: Bord Contae Uíbh Fhailí de Chumann Lúthchleas Gael) or Offaly GAA is one of the 32 county boards of the GAA in Ireland, and is responsible for Gaelic games in County Offaly. Separate county boards are also responsible for the Offaly county teams.

The county hurling team won All-Ireland Senior Hurling Championship (SHC) titles during the 1980s and 1990s. The county football team won All-Ireland Senior Football Championship (SFC) titles during the 1970s and 1980s.

== Hurling ==
=== Clubs ===
Clubs contest the Offaly Senior Hurling Championship. That competition's most successful club is Coolderry, with 31 titles.

=== County team ===
After a scheme developed by the Gaelic Athletic Association in the 1970s to encourage the playing of hurling in non-traditional counties, Offaly was one of the first teams to benefit. As a result, the county won six Leinster Senior Hurling Championship titles in the 1980s, as well as its first All-Ireland Senior Hurling Championship in 1981.

The county team has since gone on to win three other All-Irelands. Perhaps Offaly's most famous win came in the All-Ireland Final of 1994 in what has come to be remembered as the "five minute final." Limerick looked set to win their first All-Ireland title since 1973 until Offaly staged one of the greatest comebacks of all time, scoring two goals and five points in the last five minutes. They defeated Limerick by 3–16 to 2–13.

The Vocational Schools team has made it to 12 All-Ireland Vocational Schools Championship finals but have never won one.

== Football ==
=== Clubs ===
Clubs contest the Offaly Senior Football Championship. That competition's most successful club is Tullamore, with 32 titles.

=== County team ===
Perhaps the most famous moment in football history came in the 1982 All-Ireland Final when Offaly played Kerry. The match was a repeat of the previous year's final; however, not only that but a win for Kerry would have given them an unprecedented fifth consecutive All-Ireland SFC title. Kerry were winning by two points with two minutes to go when Séamus Darby came on as a substitute and scored a critical goal. Kerry fumbled the counterattack which allowed Offaly to win by one single point with a score of 1–15 to 0–17.

The Offaly vocational schools' team have made it to six All-Ireland finals but lost all six, including the first final when they were beaten by the Cork City team in 1961.

== Camogie ==
Nine Offaly camogie clubs were organised in the 1930s.

Drumcullen reached the final of the All Ireland club junior championship in 2003. Kinnity won the Division 3 shield at Féile na nGael in 1997, Drumcullen won the Coiste Chontae an Chláir Shield in 1997.

Offaly entered the Leinster championships of 1935 and 1936, but the game declined amid the Camogie Association disputes of the 1940s and had to be revived by Clare-born Mary O’Brien in 1973, and a county board re-formed in 1979.

Offaly's first major national titles were in 2002 (the second division of the National Camogie League), and in 2009 (beating Waterford in the All Ireland junior final). Notable players include soaring star award winners Karen Brady, Elaine Dermody, Audrey Kennedy, Michaela Morkan, Fiona Stephens and Arlene Watkins.

Miriam O'Callaghan served as president of the Camogie Association.

Offaly Camogie launched home and away jerseys in May 2021.

In 2025 Offaly won both the Division 2 League Final and the Intermediate Championship

== Ladies' football ==
Offaly has a ladies' football team.

== Bibliography ==
- Official History Of Offaly GAA by P J Cunningham and Ricey Scully (1984)
- Ballycumber GAA 1890–1984 edited by Eddie Cunningham
- Tullamore GAA Club History by John Clarke (1984)
