= 2025 All-Ireland Senior Camogie Championship final =

Camogie match

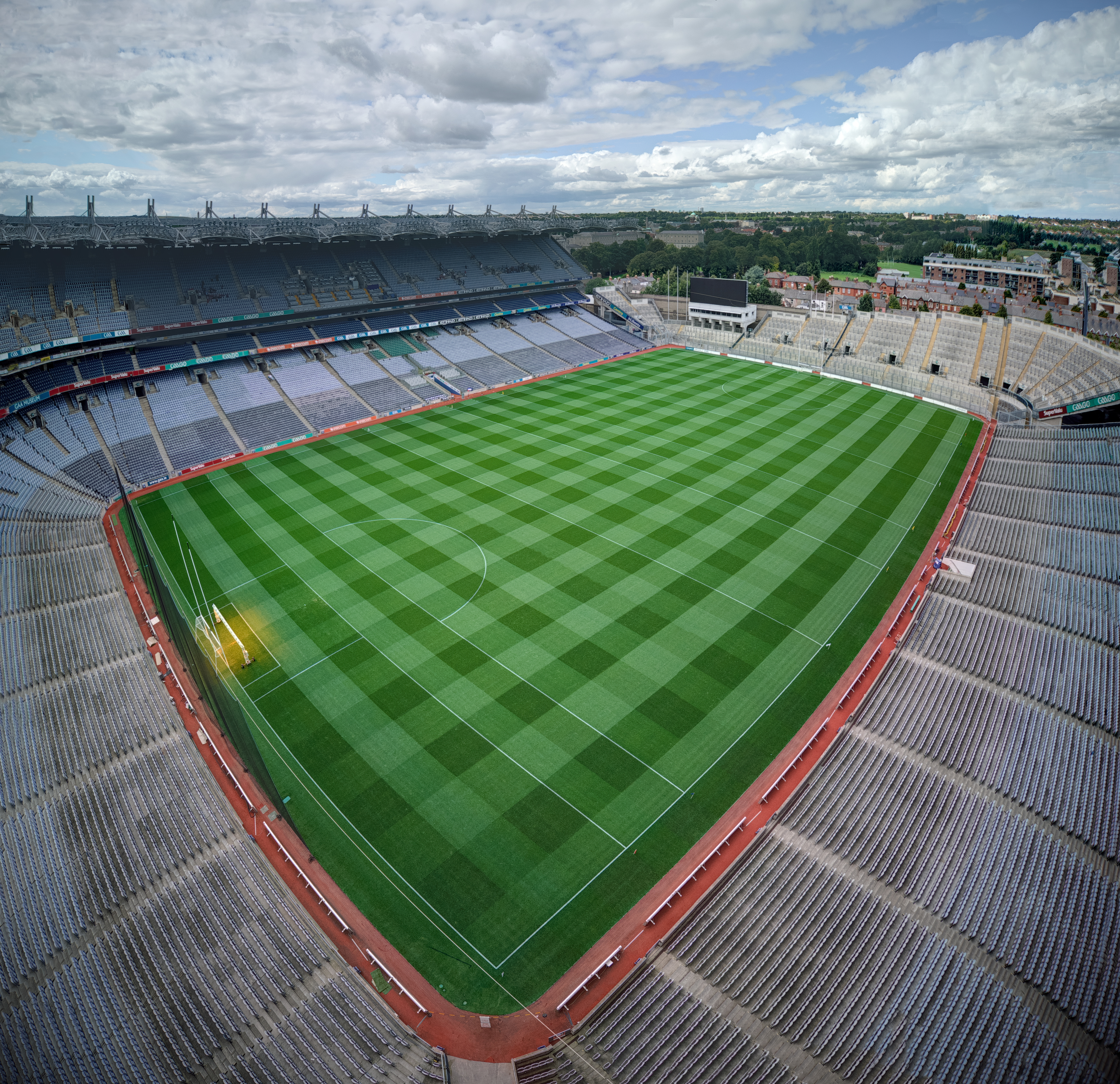
- Event: 2025 All-Ireland Senior Camogie Championship
Galway	Cork
1-14 (17)	1-13 (16)
- Galway win the Camogie All-Ireland
- Date: 10 August 2025
- Venue: Croke Park, Dublin
- Player of the Match: Aoife Donohue (Galway)
- Referee: Justin Heffernan (Wexford)
- Attendance: 28,795
- Weather: 21 °C (70 °F), sunny

The 2025 All-Ireland Senior Camogie Championship final, the 94th event of its kind and the culmination of the 2025 All-Ireland Senior Camogie Championship, was played at Croke Park on 10 August 2025. The finals of the 2025 All-Ireland Intermediate Camogie Championship and All-Ireland Junior Camogie Championship took place earlier that day at Croke Park.

Galway were the winners, defeating Cork by a point.

== Background ==
- Cork are the most successful team in the history of the championship, with 30 titles. They won the All-Ireland in 2023 and 2024; they were aiming to be the first team to complete a three-in-a-row since Wexford in 2010–12.
- Galway had a very poor record in All-Ireland finals, having appeared in 21 and lost all but four (1996, 2013, 2019, 2021) prior to this one.
- The 11th Cork–Galway final. Cork won when the two teams met in 1939, 1940, 1993, 1997, 1998, 2008, 2015 and 2024, while Galway won the finals of 1996 and 2021.

== Paths to the final ==
Cork
Round	Date	Opponent	Venue (H/A/N)	Result	Margin	Score	Ref
Group 1 game	24 May 2025	Limerick	Páirc Uí Rinn (H)	Win	38	6-25 to 0-5	
Group 1 game	31 May 2025	Tipperary	The Ragg (A)	Win	18	3-21 to 1-9	
Group 1 game	21 June 2025	Clare	Páirc Uí Chaoimh (H)	Win	9	0-21 to 1-9	
Group 1 game	28 June 2025	Wexford	Wexford Park (A)	Win	25	5-21 to 0-11	
All-Ireland semi-final	26 July 2025	Waterford	Nowlan Park (N)	Win	10	1-21 to 1-11	

Galway
Round	Date	Opponent	Venue (H/A/N)	Result	Margin	Score	Ref
Group 2 game	24 May 2025	Dublin	Kenny Park (H)	Win	6	0-15 to 1-6	
Group 2 game	31 May 2025	Derry	Owenbeg (A)	Win	32	4-25 to 0-5	
Group 2 game	21 June 2025	Kilkenny	Nowlan Park (A)	Win	8	1-17 to 0-12	
Group 2 game	28 June 2025	Waterford	Kenny Park (H)	Win	6	0-17 to 0-11	
All-Ireland semi-final	26 July 2025	Tipperary	Nowlan Park (N)	Win	7	1-18 to 1-11	

== Details ==
RTÉ 2

10 August 2025
17:15 IST (UTC+1)
Final

Report

Galway	1-14 (17) – (16) 1-13	Cork
(HT: 1-9 – 0-7)
Gls: M Dillon 1 Pts: C Dolan 7fs, A O'Reilly 3, A O'Donoghue 2, N Mallon 1, C Kelly 1		Gls: O Cahalane 1 Pts: S McCarthy 4fs, A O'Connor 3 (2fs, 1 45), E Murphy 2, A Thompson 2, H Looney 1, L Hayes 1

Croke Park, Dublin
Referee: Justin Heffernan (Wexford)
Attendance: 28,795
