= 2024 All-Ireland Senior Camogie Championship final =

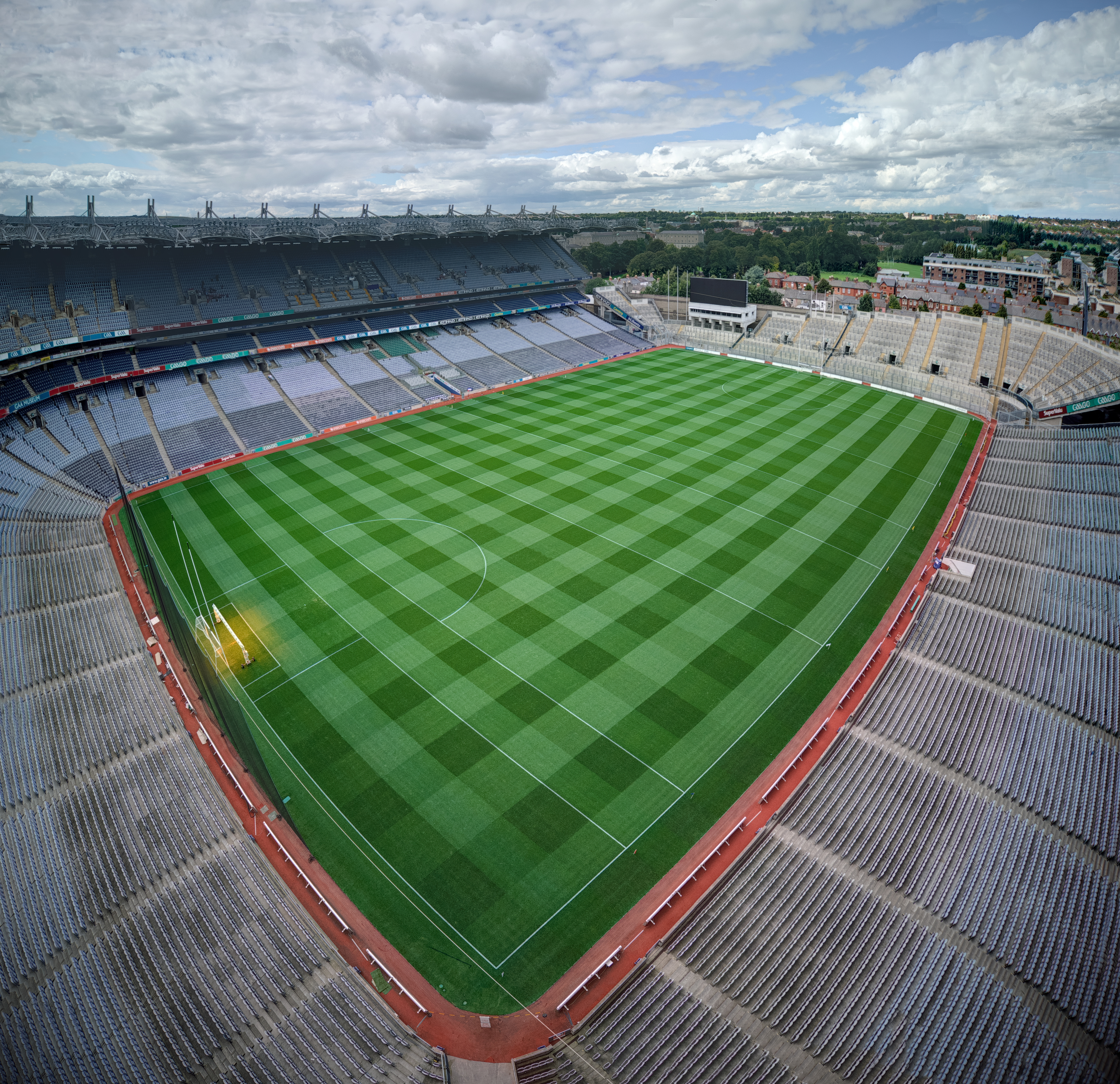
- Event: 2024 All-Ireland Senior Camogie Championship
Cork	Galway
1-16	0-16
- Date: 11 August 2024
- Venue: Croke Park, Dublin
- Player of the Match: Ashling Thompson (Cork)
- Referee: Liz Dempsey (Kilkenny)
- Attendance: 27,811
- Weather: 18–19 °C (64–66 °F), patchy rain

The 2024 All-Ireland Senior Camogie Championship Final, the 93rd event of its kind and the culmination of the 2024 All-Ireland Senior Camogie Championship, was played at Croke Park on 11 August 2024. The finals of the 2024 All-Ireland Intermediate Camogie Championship and All-Ireland Junior Camogie Championship took place earlier that day at Croke Park.

Cork defeated Galway by a goal to win a 30th All-Ireland senior camogie title.

== Background ==
- Cork were the most successful team in the history of the championship, with 29 titles. They won the All-Ireland in the previous year.
- Galway had a very poor record in All-Ireland finals, having appeared in 20 and lost all but four (1996, 2013, 2019, 2021).
- The 10th Cork–Galway final. Cork won when the two teams met in 1939, 1940, 1993, 1997, 1998, 2008 and 2015, while Galway won the finals of 1996 and 2021.

== Paths to the final ==
Cork
Round	Date	Opponent	Venue (H/A/N)	Result	Margin	Score	Ref
Group 2 game	25 May 2024	Wexford	Páirc Uí Rinn (H)	Win	9	1-15 to 1-6	
Group 2 game	1 June 2024	Down	Páirc Esler (A)	Win	23	4-21 to 1-7	
Group 2 game	8 June 2024	Clare	Cusack Park, Ennis (A)	Win	18	2-19 to 1-4	
Group 2 game	22 June 2024	Dublin	Páirc Uí Chaoimh (H)	Win	29	4-22 to 0-5	
Group 2 game	29 June 2024	Galway	Páirc Uí Chaoimh (H)	Win	12	2-16 to 1-7	
All-Ireland semi-final	27 July 2024	Dublin	Nowlan Park (N)	Win	32	4-27 to 0-9	

Galway
Round	Date	Opponent	Venue (H/A/N)	Result	Margin	Score	Ref
Group 2 game	25 May 2024	Dublin	Parnell Park (A)	Win	3	0-17 to 1-11	
Group 2 game	1 June 2024	Wexford	McCauley Park Bellefield (A)	Draw	0	2-15 to 2-15	
Group 2 game	8 June 2024	Down	Pearse Stadium (H)	Win	41	6-27 to 0-4	
Group 2 game	22 June 2024	Clare	Kenny Park (H)	Win	21	3-19 to 0-7	
Group 2 game	29 June 2024	Cork	Páirc Uí Chaoimh (A)	Loss	–12	1-7 to 2-16	
All-Ireland quarter-final	7 July 2024	Waterford	Croke Park (N)	Win	3	1-12 to 1-9	
All-Ireland semi-final	27 July 2024	Tipperary	Nowlan Park (N)	Win	1	1-12 to 1-11	

== Details ==
RTÉ 2
Sky Sports

11 August 2024
17:15 IST (UTC+01:00)

Report

Cork	1-16 (19) – (16) 0-16	Galway
(HT: 0-09 – 0-10)
Gls: K Mackey 1 Pts: A O’Connor 3fs, S McCarthy 3, O Cahalane 2, S McCartan 2, K Mackey 2, F Keating 1, C Healy 1, A Thompson 1, C Finn 1		Pts: C Dolan 8fs, A Donoghue 4, A O’Reilly 2, N Mallon 1, C Hickey 1

Croke Park, Dublin
Referee: Liz Dempsey (Kilkenny)
Attendance: 27,811
