= Gael Linn Cup 1995 =

Winners
- Champions: Munster (10th title)

Runners-up
- Runners-up: Connacht

Other
- Matches played: 3

The 1995 Gael Linn Cup, the most important representative competition for elite level participants in the women's team field sport of camogie, was won by Munster, who defeated Connacht in the final, played at Russell Park, Blanchardstown Co Dublin.

== Arrangements ==
Holders Munster defeated Ulster 3–14 to 2–10 at Russell Park. Connacht defeated Leinster 6–10 to 1–10. Munster won the final 4–13 to 3–10. In the Gael Linn Trophy semi-finals, Connacht defeated Leinster and Munster defeated Ulster 3–10 to 1–4. Mairéad Coyle scored the decisive goal in the Gael Linn trophy final to give Connacht a 1–9 to 0–10 victory over Munster.

=== Final stages ===
Final

Munster	4–13 – 3–10	Connacht

Russell Park

Munster	Connacht

|}

Munster:
GK	1	Cathleen Costine (Cork)
FB	2	Eithne Duggan (Cork)
RWB	3	Paula Coggins (Cork)
CB	4	Sandie Fitzgibbon (Cork)
LWB	5	Claire Madden (Tipperary)
MF	6	Regina O'Meara (Tipperary)
MF	7	Therese O'Callaghan (Cork)
MF	8	Stephanie Delea (Cork)
RWF	9	Ire O'Keeffe (Cork)
CF	10	Linda Mellerick (Cork)
LWF	11	Ly Delea (Cork)
FF	12	Deirdre Hughes (Tipperary)

Connacht:
GK	1	Louise Curry (Galway)
FB	2	Sheila Coen(Galway)
RWB	3	Tracey Laheen (Galway)
CB	4	Carmel Hannon (Galway)
LWB	5	Pamela Nevin(Galway)
MF	6	Olivia Broderick (Galway)
MF	7	Sharon Glynn (Galway)
MF	8	Martina Harkin (Galway)
RWF	9	Anne Ryan (Galway)
CF	10	Imelda Hobbins (Galway)
LWF	11	Deidre Costelloe (Galway)
FF	12	Claire Lynch (Galway)

== Junior Final ==
Final

Connacht	1–9 – 0–10	Munster

Russell Park

Connacht	Munster

|}

Connacht:
GK	1	Fiona Earls (Galway)
FB	2	Olive Costello (Galway)
RWB	3	Mary Grehan(Rocommon)
CB	4	Cora Curley (Galway)
LWB	5	Mary Gannon (Rocommon)
MF	6	Goretta Maher(Galway)
MF	7	Karina Jones (Rocommon)
MF	8	Carmel Hannon(Galway)
RWF	9	Martina Haverty (Galway)
CF	10	Mairéad Coyle (Rocommon)
LWF	11	Denise Gilligan (Galway)
FF	12	Veronica Curtin (Galway)

Munster
GK	1	Breda O'Brien (Limerick)
FB	2	Teresa Burke(Tipperary)
RWB	3	Colette Cronin (Cork)
CB	4	Evelyn Healy (Cork)
LWB	5	Siobhán Cusack (Tipperary)
MF	6	Vivienne Harris (Cork)
MF	7	Alice Deane (Tipperary)
MF	8	Catherine Burke(Tipperary)
RWF	9	Pauline McCarthy (Limerick)
CF	10	Ann Lenihan(Limerick)
LWF	11	Marie Ryan(Tipperary)
FF	12	Kay Borke (Limerick)

Preceded by Gael Linn Cup 1994	Gael Linn Cup; 1954 – present	Succeeded by Gael Linn Cup 1996
