= All-Ireland Senior Club Camogie Championship 1992 =

Camogie championship

Winners
- Champions: Glen Rovers (3rd title)
- Captain: Mary Ring

Runners-up
- Runners-up: Rathnure (Wx)

The 1992 All-Ireland Senior Club Camogie Championship for the leading clubs in the women's team field sport of camogie was won by Glen Rovers, who defeated Rathnure from Wexford in the final, played at Glen Rovers.

== Arrangements ==
The championship was organised on the traditional provincial system used in Gaelic Games since the 1880s, with Portglenone and Pearses winning the championships of the other two provinces. Deep into added time, Bernie Higgins scored an equalizer, Rathnure's first score of the second half. Geraldine Codd and Norma Carty added points. Pearses led by a point at the end of normal time. Portglenone scored two early goals against Glen Rover in their semi-final, before Glen began their comeback with a goal from 45 metres (148 ft) by Sandie Fitzgibbon.

== The Final ==
Glen Rovers had an easy victory in atrocious conditions, fielding five of the players who had helped Cork to win the All-Ireland Senior Championship two months earlier. Galway player, Ann Coleman, sister of All-Ireland hurler, Michael Coleman was the Rovers star alongside Sandie Fitzgibbon, Therese O'Callaghan, Mary Ring and Linda Mellerick Goalkeeper Mary Fleming was the Rathnure star.

=== Final stages ===
September 1
Semi-Final

Glen Rovers	8-17 – 4-2	Portglenone

September 8
Semi-Final

Rathnure (Wx)	2-5 – 1-6	Pearses

November 25
Final

Glen Rovers	1-9 – 0-2	Rathnure (Wx)

Glen Rovers

Glen Rovers	Rathnure

Glen Rovers:
GK	1	Mairéad O'Leary
FB	2	Mary Ring (captain)
RWB	3	Deirdre McCarthy
CB	4	Sandie Fitzgibbon
LWB	5	Diane Deane
MF	6	Mandy Kennefick
MF	7	Therese O'Callaghan
MF	8	Ann Coleman
RWF	9	Linda Mellerick
CF	10	Denise Cronin
LWF	11	Patricia Murphy
FF	12	Claire McCarthy

Rathnure (Wx):
GK	1	Mary Fleming
FB	2	Catherine Murphy
RWB	3	Anna-Mai White
CB	4	Mary Hayden (captain)
LWB	5	Patricia Dreelan
MF	6	Norma Carty
MF	7	Eileen Dillon
MF	8	Ann Reddy
RWF	9	Geraldine Codd
CF	10	Lilian Doyle
LWF	11	Bernie Higgins
FF	12	Bridget Howlin

Preceded by All-Ireland Senior Club Camogie Championship 1991	All-Ireland Senior Club Camogie Championship; 1964 – present	Succeeded by All-Ireland Senior Club Camogie Championship 1993
