= 1998 All-Ireland Senior Camogie Championship =

Camogie championship

All-Ireland Senior Camogie Championship 1998
Championship details
- Dates: 3 June — 5 September 1998
- Teams: 6

All-Ireland champions
- Winners: Cork (19th win)
- Captain: Eithne Duggan

All-Ireland runners-up
- Runners-up: Galway
- Captain: Olivia Broderick
- Manager: Tony Ward

The 1998 All-Ireland Senior Camogie Championship—known as the Bórd na Gaeilge All-Ireland Senior Camogie Championship for sponsorship reasons—was the high point of the 1998 season and the first All-Ireland Camogie Final to be televised live. The championship was won by Cork who defeated Galway by a four-point margin in the final. The match attracted an attendance of 10,436, a then record for the sport of camogie.

== Semi-finals ==
Newly returned to senior ranks, Tipperary had a surprise 3-11 to 3-10 victory over Kilkenny through goals from Noelle Kennedy, Deirdre Hughes and Eimear McDonnell. They played Galway in the All Ireland semi-final without their star forward, Deidre Hughes, while Galway played without Sharon Glynn. A long free by Colette Nevin to Anne Forde who scored a goal followed by two Galway points to secure a three-point win. Sinéad O'Callaghan and Irne O'Keeffe scored goals for Cork in their 2-15 to 1-9 victory over Clare in the second semi-final.

== Final ==
Cork chose to play with the strong wind in the first half and Galway succumbed to two well-taken goals in the first half by O'Keeffe, playing in her last inter-county match. The first came after 17 minutes the second came after Sinead O'Callaghan's shot rebounded off the crossbar.

This enabled Cork to build themselves a winning lead and hold on to survive the best challenges Galway offered. Only the impressive scoring form of Nevin kept Galway in touch, leaving them four points down at half time, 2–7 to 0–9. Ian O'Riordan wrote in The Irish Times:

Last year’s captain, Linda Mellerick, was once again a marvel at midfield and even though she only once made the scoreboard, she created plenty of scores. Considering Mellerick had planned to retire after last season's victory, you just had to wonder where she continues to get her energy and enthusiasm.”

Jim O'Sullivan, who described Mellerick’s performance as her “her best ever in the red and white”, wrote in the Irish Examiner:

Picture the scene: Cork, who could only manage a four-point (2–7 to 0–9) half time lead after playing with the driving wind and rain, were battling with their backs to the wall and a point in front with four minutes to go, as Galway threw everything at them in search of the winning goal. Yet, the Leesiders found reserves of strength to weather the storm...

The double goal scorer O'Keeffe said:

We always thought that there wouldn't be much more in it than a couple of goals. They kept coming at us alright but our back line was very strong and that made a big difference in the end. Winning again against Galway adds a little extra buzz because they're probably our greatest rivals at the moment.

=== Final stages ===
August 21
Semi-Final

Galway	2-11 – 0-14	Tipperary

Nowlan Park, Kilkenny

August 21
Semi-Final

Cork	2-15 – 1-9	Clare

Nowlan Park, Kilkenny

September 6
Final

Cork	2-15 – 1-9	Galway

Croke Park, Dublin

Cork	Galway

CORK:
GK	1	Cora Keohane (Barryroe)
FB	2	Eithne Duggan (Bishopstown) (Capt)
RWB	3	Denise Cronin (Glen Rovers)
CB	4	Vivienne Harris (Bishopstown)
LWB	5	Mag Finn (Fr O'Neill’s)
MF	6	Ursula Tory (Newtownshandrum) (substituted off) 45'
MF	7	Mary O'Connor (Killeagh) (0-1)
MF	8	Linda Mellerick (Glen Rovers)
RWF	9	Sinéad O'Callaghan(Ballinhassig)
CF	10	Fiona O'Driscoll (Fr O'Neill’s) (0-3)
LWF	11	Ine O'Keeffe (2-0) (Inniscarra)
FF	12	Lyn Delea (Glen Rovers) (0-9)
Substitutes:
RWF		Miriam Deasy (Kilbrittain–Timoleague) for Troy (substituted in) 45)' (substituted off) 60'
MF		Paula O'Connor (Newtownshandrum) for Deasy (substituted in) 60'

GALWAY:
GK	1	Louise Curry (Pearses) (0-1)
FB	2	Olivia Broderick (Davitts) (Capt)
RWB	3	Anne Broderick (Davitts)
CB	4	Tracy Laheen(Pearses) (0-1)
LWB	5	Pamela Nevin (Mullagh) (0-1)
MF	6	Therese Maher (Athenry) (0-3)
MF	7	Sharon Glynn (Pearses) (0-1)
MF	8	Āine Hillary (Pearses) (0-1) (0-1)
RWF	9	Colette Nevin (Cappataggle (0-7)
CF	10	Imelda Hobbins (Mullagh) (0-1)
LWF	11	Veronica Curtin (Kinvara) (0-1) (substituted off) 50'
FF	12	Anne Ford (Pearses) (0-1)
Substitutes:
FF		Denise Gilligan (Craughwell) for Curtin (substituted in) 50'

Preceded by All-Ireland Senior Camogie Championship 1997	All-Ireland Senior Camogie Championship; 1932 – present	Succeeded by All-Ireland Senior Camogie Championship 1999
