= 1995 All-Ireland Senior Camogie Championship =

Camogie championship

All-Ireland Senior Camogie Championship 1995
Championship details
- Dates: 3 June – 24 September 1995
- Teams: 6

All-Ireland champions
- Winners: Cork (17th win)
- Captain: Denise Cronin
- Manager: Tom Nott

All-Ireland runners-up
- Runners-up: Kilkenny
- Captain: Angela Downey

Championship statistics
- Matches played: 7

The 1995 All-Ireland Senior Camogie Championship—known as the Bórd na Gaeilge All-Ireland Senior Camogie Championship for sponsorship reasons—was the high point of the 1995 season. The championship was won by Cork who defeated Killkenny by a four-point margin in the final, taking the lead for only the first time in the match with a goal by Linda Mellerick that dropped into the net from a long shot with just 30 seconds of normal time left. The match drew an attendance of 9,874, then the highest for a camogie-only final (one which was not on a jint hurling programme), beating the 52-year-old attendance record set for Dublin v Cork in 1943. Lyn Dunlea scored 4–20 in the championship.

== Sponsorship ==
Bord na Gaeilge became the first sponsor of an All-Ireland camogie championship. At the launch Micheál Ó Muircheartaigh, Cathaoirleach of Bord na Gaeilge, said that "in sponsoring the camogie championship, Bord na Gaeilge is underlining the importance of promoting Irish at community level."

== Semi-finals ==
A powerful finishing 15 minutes saw Cork beat Wexford in the All-Ireland semi-final at Páirc Uí Rinn in a match in which a match in which Lyn Delea scored 3–9. while Kilkenny trailed Galway by 1–6 to 0–6 at half-time in the semi-final at Nowlan Park, before Sinéad Millea’s free-taking yielded eleven points, and Sinéad ran through the Galway defence to place Gillian Dillon for the all-important goal to give Kilkenny a 1-14 to 1-9 victory.

== Final ==
Angela Downey bought her three-year-old daughter Katie in the pre-match parade for the final, a free ridden stop-start affair. She was marked by Paula Coggins in the final. Lyn Delea palmed a Cork goal, Angela Downey’s shot from a free cancelled it out. Cork sent on 17-year-old Vivienne Harris (a niece of international soccer player Miah Dennehy) as a sub and she made an immediate impact. Angela Downey scored another goal from another 15-metre free. Cork captain, Denise Cronin, finished a spectacular solo run through the Kilkenny defence with a goal. Kilkenny were leading by a point when Linda Mellerick gathered a short clearance and landed a speculative ball in the goal giving Cork the lead for the first time. A third close-in free by Angela Downey was defended and Cork won by four points. Kathryn Davis wrote in the Irish Times:

Putting ghosts to rest is a regular pastime at Corke Park and another was laid to rest yesterday when Cork defeated Killkenny for the first time in six final meetings over the past 20 years. A goal by Linda Mellerick with only 30 seconds of normal time remaining saw Cork take the trophy for the 17th time.

Linda Mellerick said:

I knew we were a point down so when I caught the ball I kept going and just hit it. I was not certain whether I had scored as they were a bit slow in putting up the flag, but the crowd was cheering and then I realised that it was a goal. Words cannot describe what it is like beating Kilkenny in a final. With ten minutes to go we were dead and buried and God must have had a hand in it.

== Family links ==
Sisters Lyn and Stephanie Delea were grandnieces of Kate Delea who captained Cork to their first All-Ireland success in 1934.

=== Final stages ===
August 27
Semi-Final

Cork	5-13 – 1-6	Wexford

Páirc Uí Rinn, Cork

August 27
Semi-Final

Kilkenny	1-14 – 1-9	Galway

Nowlan Park, Kilkenny

September 24
Final

Cork	4-8 – 2-10	Kilkenny

Croke Park, Dublin

Cork	Kilkenny

CORK:
GK	1	Kathleen Costine (Killeagh)
FB	2	Eithne Duggan (Bishopstown)
RWB	3	Paula Coggins (Inniscarra)
CB	4	Sandie Fitzgibbon (Glen Rovers)
LWB	5	Mag Finn (Fr O'Neill's)
MF	6	Linda Mellerick (Glen Rovers) (1–0)
MF	7	Denise Cronin (Glen Rovers) (1–0) (Capt)
MF	8	Stephanie Delea (Glen Rovers)
RWF	9	Fiona O'Driscoll (Fr O'Neill's) (1-1)
CF	10	Therése O'Callaghan (Glen Rovers)
LWF	11	Ine O'Keeffe (Inniscarra) (2–0)
FF	12	Lyn Delea (Glen Rovers) (1–7).
Substitutes:
RWF		Vivienne Harris (Bishopstown) (substituted in) 45)'

KILKENNY:
GK	1	Michelle Fennelly (Ballyhale Shamrocks)
FB	2	Deidre Maloney (St Brigid's Ballycallan)
RWB	3	Margaret Hickey (St Lachtain's)
CB	4	Sinéad Costello (St Lachtain's)
LWB	5	Bridget Banaville (Lisdowney)
MF	6	Marina Downey (Lisdowney)
MF	7	Ann Downey (Lisdowney)
MF	8	Marie Meagher (St Martin’s)
RWF	9	Sinéad Millea (St Brigid's Ballycallan) (0–5)
CF	10	Breda Holmes (Lisdowney)
LWF	11	Angela Downey (Lisdowney) (Capt) (2–5)
FF	12	Gillian Dillon (St Lachtain's)
Substitutes:
RWF		Tracy Millea (St Brigid's Ballycallan) (substituted in) 45)'

Preceded by All-Ireland Senior Camogie Championship 1994	All-Ireland Senior Camogie Championship; 1932 – present	Succeeded by All-Ireland Senior Camogie Championship 1996
