= 2023 All-Ireland Senior Camogie Championship final =

2023 All-Ireland Senior Camogie Championship Final
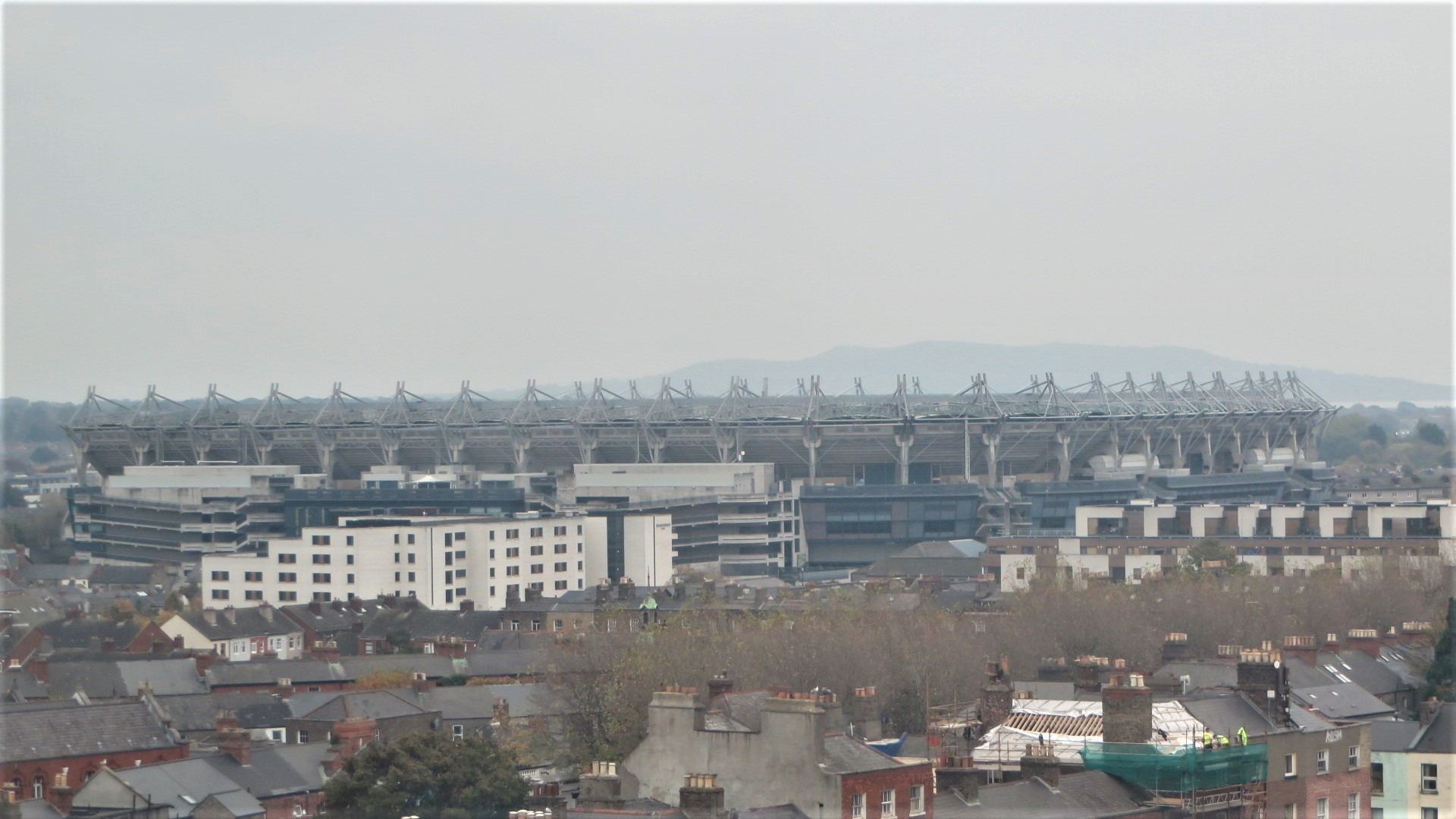
- Event: 2023 All-Ireland Senior Camogie Championship
| Waterford | Cork |
| 0-9 | 5-13 |
- Date: 6 August 2023
- Venue: Croke Park, Dublin
- Player of the Match: Amy O'Connor (Cork)
- Referee: John Dermody (Meath)
- Weather: 15–17 °C (59–63 °F), showers

The 2023 All-Ireland Senior Camogie Championship Final, the 92nd event of its kind and the culmination of the 2023 All-Ireland Senior Camogie Championship, was played at Croke Park on 6 August 2023. The finals of the 2023 All-Ireland Intermediate Camogie Championship and All-Ireland Junior Camogie Championship took place earlier that day at Croke Park. It was won by Cork, who defeated Waterford. Captain Amy O'Connor scored 3-7, giving Cork a record 29th All-Ireland Senior Camogie Championship title. The attendance of 30,191 was the second biggest for a camogie final.

== Background ==
- Waterford made their second final appearance; their first was in 1945, losing to Antrim.
- Cork were the most successful team in the history of the All-Ireland Senior Camogie Championship, with 28 titles. Their last win was in 2018.
- The first all-Munster final since 2006.

== Paths to the final ==
=== Cork ===
| 3 June 2023 Group A | Galway | 1-12 – 0-12 | Cork | Athenry |
| | | | | Stadium: Kenny Park |

| 17 June 2023 Group A | Cork | 3-19 – 1-10 | Down | Cork |
| | | | | Stadium: Páirc Uí Chaoimh |

| 1 July 2023 Group A | Clare | 0-08 – 3-19 | Cork | Ennis |
| | | | | Stadium: Cusack Park |

| 9 July 2023 Quarter-final | Kilkenny | 2-13 – 2-14 | Cork | Dublin |
| | | | | Stadium: Croke Park |

| 22 July 2023 Semi-final | Galway | 2-06 – 0-15 | Cork | Kilkenny |
| | | | | Stadium: Nowlan Park |

=== Waterford ===
| 3 June 2023 Group C | Offaly | 1-09 – 2-26 | Waterford | Banagher |
| | | | | Stadium: Fr. McNally Park |

| 18 June 2023 Group C | Limerick | 0-11 – 2-19 | Waterford | Cappamore |
| | | | | Stadium: Cappamore GAA Grounds |

| 1 July 2023 Group C | Waterford | 5-16 – 0-10 | Antrim | Waterford |
| | | | | Stadium: SETU Arena |

| 22 July 2023 Semi-final | Waterford | 1-12 – 1-11 | Tipperary | Kilkenny |
| | | | | Stadium: Nowlan Park |

== Details ==
| 6 August 2023; 17:00 IST (UTC+1); 2023 All-Ireland Final | Waterford | 0-09 – 5-13 | Cork | Croke Park; Attendance: 30,191; Referee: John Dermody (Meath) |
| 6 August 2023; 17:00 IST (UTC+1); 2023 All-Ireland Final | B Carton 0-7 (5fs); N Rockett, L Forrest 0-1 each | Report | A O’Connor 3-7 (0-5fs); S McCartan 1-1; F Keating 1-0; K Mackey 0-2; H Looney, C Sigerson (f), O Cahalane 0-1 each | Croke Park; Attendance: 30,191; Referee: John Dermody (Meath) |
