= 2019 All-Ireland Senior Camogie Championship final =

2019 camogie match

2019 All-Ireland Senior Camogie Championship Final
- Event: 2019 All-Ireland Senior Camogie Championship
Kilkenny	Galway
0-17	3-14
- Date: 8 September 2019
- Venue: Croke Park, Dublin
- Referee: Ray Kelly (Kildare)
- Weather: 18 °C, fine

The 2019 All-Ireland Senior Camogie Championship Final, the 88th event of its kind and the culmination of the 2019 All-Ireland Senior Camogie Championship, was played at Croke Park in Dublin on 8 September 2019.

Deferred coverage of the final was broadcast by Sky Sports for the first time. Galway were the winners.

== Background ==
Galway were aiming for their third camogie All-Ireland; they previously won in 1996 and 2013.

Kilkenny aimed for their fourteenth title, their first since 2016.

The two teams had only met in the final once before — in 2013, when Galway won.

== Paths to the final ==
=== Galway ===
15 June 2019 Group Stage	Galway	0-14 (14) – (16) 1-13	Kilkenny	Athenry
17:00 IST (UTC+1)				Venue: Kenny Park
				Referee: Cathal Egan

22 June 2019 Group Stage	Offaly	0-06 (6) – (24) 3-15	Galway	Lusmagh
17:00 IST (UTC+1)				Venue: Lusmagh GAA
				Referee: John Dermody

14 July 2019 Group Stage	Galway	2-12 (18) – (13) 1-10	Limerick	Athenry
14:30 IST (UTC+1)				Venue: Kenny Park
				Referee: John Dermody

20 July 2019 Group Stage	Wexford	0-04 (4) – (34) 3-25	Galway	Enniscorthy
17:00 IST (UTC+1)				Venue: Belfield GAA Complex
				Referee: Liz Dempsey

3 August 2019 Quarter-Final	Galway	2-16 (22) – (14) 2-08	Waterford	Thurles
19:15 IST (UTC+1)				Venue: Semple Stadium
		Report		Referee: Owen Elliott (Antrim)

17 August 2019 Semi-Final	Galway	0-14 (14) – (13) 1-10	Cork	Limerick
19:15 IST (UTC+1)				Venue: Gaelic Grounds
		Report		Referee: Liz Dempsey (Kilkenny)

=== Kilkenny ===
15 June 2019 Group Stage	Galway	0-14 (14) – (16) 1-13	Kilkenny	Athenry
17:00 IST (UTC+1)				Venue: Kenny Park
				Referee: Cathal Egan

22 June 2019 Group Stage	Wexford	0-06 (6) – (49) 7-28	Kilkenny	Enniscorthy
17:00 IST (UTC+1)				Venue: Belfield GAA Complex
				Referee: Ray Kelly (Kildare)

29 June 2019 Group Stage	Kilkenny	2-17 (23) – (13) 2-07	Offaly	Kilkenny
17:00 IST (UTC+1)				Venue: Nowlan Park
				Referee: Eamon Cassidy

20 July 2019 Group Stage	Kilkenny	4-23 (35) – (16) 1-13	Limerick	Callan
17:00 IST (UTC+1)				Venue: John Locke's Park
				Referee: Cathal Egan

17 August 2019 Semi-Final	Kilkenny	2-21 (27) – (21) 3-12	Tipperary	Limerick
17:30 IST (UTC+1)				Venue: Gaelic Grounds
		Report		Referee: John Dermody (Westmeath)

== Match info ==
RTÉ 2
Sky Sports

8 September 2019
16:15 IST
Final

Report

Kilkenny	0-17 (17) – (23) 3-14	Galway
(HT: 0-10 – 3-07)
Pts: Michelle Quilty 8 (7f), Denise Gaule 3 (1f), Anne Dalton 2 (1f), Miriam Walsh 1, Davina Tobin 1, Anna Farrell 1, Aoife Doyle 1		Gls: Ailish O'Reilly 2, Niamh Hannify 1 Pts: Carrie Dolan 6 (5f, 1 '45), Niamh Kilkenny 4, Sarah Healy 1, Catherine Finnerty 1, Sarah Spellman 1, Noreen Coen 1

Croke Park, Dublin
Referee: Ray Kelly (Kildare)
Attendance: 24,730
