= 1997 All-Ireland Senior Camogie Championship =

Camogie championship

All-Ireland Senior Camogie Championship 1997
Championship details
- Dates: 3 June — 7 September 1997

All-Ireland champions
- Winners: Cork (18th win)
- Captain: Linda Mellerick

All-Ireland runners-up
- Runners-up: Galway
- Captain: Martina Harkin
- Manager: Tony Ward

The 1997 All-Ireland Senior Camogie Championship—known as the Bórd na Gaeilge All-Ireland Senior Camogie Championship for sponsorship reasons—was the high point of the 1997 season. The championship was won by Cork who defeated Galway by a four-point margin in the final. The match drew an attendance of 10,212, then the second highest in the history of camogie.

== Semi-finals ==
The 22-year-old Sharon Glynn scored 2-12 in the semi-final including a 56th-minute goal just as Kilkenny were clawing their way back into the game in the semi-final at Loughrea. Wexford were outplayed by Cork in the second semi-final at Páirc Uí Rínn.

== Final ==
Angela Downey described the final as a slow-paced match and a poor game, but Cork deserved to win. Although Lynn Dunlea stretched Cork's lead to double scores, 0-14 to 1-4, almost 20 minutes into the second half the game had an unexpectedly exciting finish with Therese Maher being denied a match-saving goal by the Cork goalkeeper Cora Keohane. Pat Roche wrote in the Irish Times:

Weathering a storm of Galway onslaughts in the closing 10 minutes had been an achievement in itself. Avenging last year's defeat by Galway was sheer joy for the team - and for the supporters it was a delight to watch the skills of goalkeeper Cora Keohane, defenders Denise Cronin and Sandie Fitzgibbon, garnished by the delicate scoring touches of Lynn Dunlea, The timing of her scores in the second half was as crucial as the points themselves, as they staved off a threatened Galway storm. The best example of this came in the seventh minute of the second half after Denise Gilligan smashed home Galway's first goal, leaving only three points between the sides. Dunlea added a second to take the good out of that Galway goal and was on the mark again inside the last five minutes when the defiant Galway women got the deficit down to four points with a goal from substitute Veronica Curtin.

Galway manager Tony Ward said:

We threw it away in the first half. We have no excuses, we never played as well as we can."It's a double disappointment, I suppose, to lose two All-Irelands back to back. Still, I don't think anybody can say that there was too much between the teams out there. That extra bit of experience and luck probably saw them through, but we gave them a good match all the same.

=== Final stages ===
August 10
Semi-Final

Galway	4-14 – 2-11	Kilkenny

Loughrea

August 17
Semi-Final

Cork	3-22 – 1-7	Wexford

Páirc Uí Rinn, Cork

September 7
Final

Cork	0-15 – 2-5	Galway

Croke Park, Dublin

Cork	Galway

CORK:
GK	1	Cora Keohane (Barryroe)
FB	2	Eithne Duggan (Bishopstown)
RWB	3	Denise Cronin (Glen Rovers)
CB	4	Sandie Fitzgibbon (Glen Rovers)
LWB	5	Mag Finn (Fr O'Neill’s)
MF	6	Linda Mellerick (Glen Rovers) (Capt)
MF	7	Vivienne Harris (Bishopstown) (0-4)
MF	8	Mary O'Connor (Killeagh) (0-1)
RWF	9	Sinéad O'Callaghan(Ballinhassig)
CF	10	Fiona O'Driscoll (Fr O'Neill’s)
LWF	11	Irne O'Keeffe (2-0) (Inniscarra)
FF	12	Lynn Dunlea (Glen Rovers) (0-10)
Substitutes:
MF		Ellen Buckley (Aghabullogue GAA) (substituted in) 30'

GALWAY:
GK	1	Louise Curry (Pearses)
FB	2	Olivia Costello(Sarsfields)
RWB	3	Olive Broderick (Davitts)
CB	4	Tracy Laheen (Pearses)
LWB	5	Pamela Nevin (Mullagh)
MF	6	Greta Meagher (Athenry)
MF	7	Sharon Glynn (Pearses) (0-3)
MF	8	Dympna Meagher (Athenry)
RWF	9	Martina Harkin (Pearses) (Capt)
CF	10	Imelda Hobbins (Mullagh)
LWF	11	Denise Gilligan (Craughwell) (1-0)
FF	12	Anne Ford (Pearses) (0-1).
Substitutes:
FF		Veronica Curtin (Kinvara) (substituted in) 50'
FF		Therese Maher (Athenry) (substituted in) 50'

Preceded by All-Ireland Senior Camogie Championship 1996	All-Ireland Senior Camogie Championship; 1932 – present	Succeeded by All-Ireland Senior Camogie Championship 1998
