= 1996 All-Ireland Senior Camogie Championship =

Camogie championship

All-Ireland Senior Camogie Championship 1996
Championship details
- Dates: 5 June – 22 September 1996

All-Ireland champions
- Winners: Galway (1st win)
- Captain: Imelda Hobbins
- Manager: Tony Ward

All-Ireland runners-up
- Runners-up: Cork
- Captain: Therese O'Callaghan

The 1996 All-Ireland Senior Camogie Championship—known as the Bórd na Gaeilge All-Ireland Senior Camogie Championship for sponsorship reasons—was the high point of the 1996 season. The championship was won for the first time in the county’s history by Galway who defeated Killkenny by a two-point margin in the final. The match drew an attendance of 10,235, then the highest in the history of camogie.

== Semi-finals ==
Martina Harkin retrieved a ball near the end line and set up the 15-year-old Veronica Curtin for a goal for Galway against Wexford after just two minutes of the All Ireland semi-final for what proved to be the decisive goal of the match. Cork defeated Kilkenny by four points in a disappointing second semi-final at Páirc Uí Rinn. The Connacht Tribune reported:

They built up a nine point lead in the first half and showed a resolve after the break that never let Wexford back into the game. The Wexford goal proved little more than a consolation score, coming in the last few minutes when all was already lost.

Cork had to fight all the way to Beat Kilkenny by four points at Páirc Uí Rinn, having led 0-7 to 0-4 at half-time Sinéad Millea had picked off some fine points to raise Kilkenny hopes before Lynn Dunlea struck for the decisive goal for Cork.

== Final ==
Two goals either side of half time from Denise Gilligan decided the outcome of the final. When midfielder Sharon Glynn pointing from a free in the first minute in the final, the score was not recorded. Galway manager Tony Ward had clarified with referee Aine Derham that the point stood. The players were unaware that the score was actually closer than displayed.

Shortly after scoring, Glynn took a blow to the head which affected her for long periods, particularly in the opening half, with her accuracy deserting her. Her long pucks from midfield frequently went wide, and Galway had five wides in the opening 30 minutes.

Cork, edged ahead 0-5 to 0-4 by the 20th minute, with all their scores coming from frees as Lyn Delea and Fiona O'Driscoll displayed their accuracy have thought that the game was theirs for the taking when Lynn Dunlea displayed remarkable persistence in shaking off the attentions of Olivia Costello to put her side ahead 1-7 to 0-4."

Cork led by three points at half time, it would have been six had not Denise Gilligan scored the first of her two goals. Denise Gilligan received from Sharon Glynn for the first of two goals in three minutes at the start for the second half. Two minutes later Gilligan was also involved in the move that saw the winners edge in front when she found Harkin. Cathleen Costine saved again but Marian Harkin retained her composure to score Galway’s third goal. Galway now led by 3-6 to 1-9.

They set about consolidating their position, and Sharon Glynn pointed from a 30. A further goal from Dympna Meagher, who was another to display remarkable coolness under pressure, made the Cork task that much more difficult, although they still had 18 minutes to retrieve their title. Cork brought it back to a two-point margin, they spurned some easy point chances in search of a goal. Galway won their first All-Ireland in their tenth final appearance 63 years after their first.

Lyn Delea gave the winners moments of anxiety right at the end when she pointed twice one from a placed ball to leave the victory margin only two points.

Galway captain Imelda Hobbins said:

"I knew that if we were below six points behind them at the break that we would win the All Ireland. Those goals just after the break were an almighty boost for us.

[Denise Gilligan said:

"I can't believe it. I thought the final whistle would never go. When Cork were ahead we knew we had it all to play for. But in the second half we got in front of the backs and that was the difference. We were also playing the ball in low to the forwards."

Denise later went to live in London and played for Tara in the All Ireland Junior club final of 2011, 15 years after her two goal All Ireland winning performance.

=== Final stages ===
August 18
Semi-Final

Cork	1-13 – 0-11	Kilkenny

Páirc Uí Rinn, Cork

August 25
Semi-Final

Galway	1-13 – 1-5	Wexford

Loughrea

September 22
Final

Galway	4-8 – 1-15	Cork

Croke Park, Dublin

Galway	Cork

GALWAY:
GK	1	Louise Curry (Pearses)
FB	2	Olivia Costello (Sarsfields)
RWB	3	Anna Broderick(Davitts)
CB	4	Olive Broderick (Davitts) (substituted off) 31'
LWB	5	Pamela Nevin (Mullagh)
MF	6	Dympna Meagher (Shamrocks) (1-0)
MF	7	Sharon Glynn (Pearses) (0-5)
MF	8	Carmel Hannon (Pearses) (substituted off) 34'
RWF	9	Martina Harkin (Pearses) (1-1)
CF	10	Imelda Hobbins (Mullagh) (Capt) (0-1)
LWF	11	Denise Gilligan (Craughwell) (2-0)
FF	12	Veronica Curtin (Craughwell) (0-1).
Substitutes:
CB		Carmel Allen (Craughwell) for Olivia Broderick (substituted in) 31'
MF		Gretta Meagher (Shamrocks) for Hannon (substituted in) 34'

CORK:
GK	1	Cathleen Costine (Killeagh)
FB	2	Eithne Duggan (Bishopstown)
RWB	3	Paula Coggins (Inniscarra) (substituted off) 40'
CB	4	Sandie Fitzgibbon (Glen Rovers)
LWB	5	Mag Finn (Fr O'Neill’s)
MF	6	Therése O'Callaghan (Glen Rovers) (Capt) (substituted off) 55'
MF	7	Vivienne Harris (Bishopstown)
MF	8	Linda Mellerick (Glen Rovers) (0-1)
RWF	9	Denise Cronin (Glen Rovers)
CF	10	Mary O'Connor (Killeagh) (0-1) (substituted off) 35'
LWF	11	Fiona O'Driscoll (Fr O'Neill’s) (0-4)
FF	12	Lyn Delea (Glen Rovers) (1-9).
Substitutes:
CF		Stephanie Delea (Glen Rovers) for O’Connor (substituted in) 35'
RWB		Miriam Deasy (Kilbrittain–Timoleague) for Goggins (substituted in) 40'
MF		Ine O'Keeffe (inniscarra) for O'Callaghan (substituted in) 55'

Preceded by All-Ireland Senior Camogie Championship 1995	All-Ireland Senior Camogie Championship; 1932 – present	Succeeded by All-Ireland Senior Camogie Championship 1997
