= 1992 All-Ireland Senior Camogie Championship =

Camogie championship

All-Ireland Senior Camogie Championship 1992
Championship details
- Dates: June – 27 September 1992

All-Ireland champions
- Winners: Cork (15th win)
- Captain: Sandie Fitzgibbon
- Manager: Joe McGrath

All-Ireland runners-up
- Runners-up: Wexford
- Captain: Catherine Murphy

Championship statistics
- Matches played: 7

The 1992 All-Ireland Senior Camogie Championship was the high point of the 1992 season. The championship was won by Cork, who defeated Wexford by a 14-point margin in the final for their third successive success. The match drew an attendance of 4,000.

== Semi-finals ==
All-Ireland semi-finalists in 1933, Kildare re-entered the senior championships and were beaten in the quarter-final by Galway, 9-14 to 3-4 after an evenly contested first half at Clane, Sharon Glynn scoring 4-5 of their total. Kilkenny had a huge 9-20 to 0-5 win over Clare on July 12. Two well-taken goals by Colette Mahony gave Cork a victory over Kilkenny in the semi-final while Anna Reddy and Anne Marie O'Connor gave Wexford their two goals in victory over Galway.

== Final ==
Fiona O'Driscoll got the only goal of the final in the 24th minute and Cork had little to worry about as they led by four points at half time and won by eleven. Desmond Fahy’s evocative intro to the Irish Times report of the final read

One week on, Clonllffe Road was eerily quiet before yesterday’s ALL-Ireland senior camogie final between Cork and Wexford. Some optimistic hawkers were taking advantage of the last opportunity of the year to sell some colours. This, however, is not to detract from what went on inside Croke Park. Cork and Wexford served up an entertaining and, at times, highly skilled final, that deserved a better crowd.

=== Final stages ===
August 16
Semi-final

Cork	2-11 – 1-8	Kilkenny

Nowlan Park, Kilkenny

August 16
Semi-final

Wexford	2-11 – 1-11	Galway

Monamolin

1992-9-17
Final
15:00 BST

Cork	1-20 – 2-6	Wexford
Collette O'Mahony 0-10, Fiona O'Driscoll 1-2, Ine O'Keeffe 0-4, Linda Mellerick 0-2, Liz O'Neill 0-2		Geraldine Codd 1-3, Paula Rankin 1-0, Anna Reddy 0-2, Catherine Murphy 0-1

Croke Park, Dublin
Attendance: 4,000
Referee: Áine Derham (Dublin)

Cork	Wexford

CORK:
GK	1	Marian McCarthy (Éire Óg)
FB	2	Liz Dunphy
RWB	3	Paula Coggins (Inniscarra)
CB	4	Breda Kenny
LWB	5	Liz Towler
MF	6	Collette O'Mahony (0-3)
MF	7	Therese O'Callaghan (Capt)
MF	8	Sandie Fitzgibbon (Glen Rovers) (0-1)
RWF	9	Linda Mellerick (Glen Rovers)
CF	10	Ger McCarthy (Glen Rovers) (0-1)
LWF	11	Liz O'Neill (substituted off) 50'
FF	12	Irne O'Leary (0-5)
Substitutes:
FF		Ine O'Keeffe (inniscarra) for O'Neill (substituted in) 50'

Sub used:

WEXFORD:
GK	1	Terri Butler (Buffers Alley)
FB	2	Tina Fitzhenry (Duffry Rovers)
RWB	3	Jean O'Leary (St Ibar's/Shelmalier)
CB	4	Catherine Murphy (Rathnure) (Capt) (0-1)
LWB	5	Deidre Hearne (St Ibar's/Shelmalier)
MF	6	Máire Codd (Rathnure)
MF	7	Stella Sinnott (Buffers Alley)
MF	8	Paula Rankin (Bunclody) (1-0)
RWF	9	Anne Marie O'Connor (Rathnure) (substituted in) 49'
CF	10	Ann Reddy (Rathnure) (0-2)
LWF	11	Geraldine Codd (Rathnure) (1-3)
FF	12	Angie Hearne (St Ibar's/Shelmalier) (substituted in) 36'
Substitutes:
FF		Ellen Dillon for Hearn (substituted in) 36'
RWF		Mary Hayden (Rathnure) for O'Connor (substituted in) 49'

Match rules

- 50 minutes
- Replay if scores level
- Maximum of 3 substitutions

== See also ==
- All-Ireland Senior Hurling Championship
- Wikipedia List of Camogie players
- National Camogie League
- Camogie All Stars Awards
- Ashbourne Cup

Preceded by All-Ireland Senior Camogie Championship 1991	All-Ireland Senior Camogie Championship; 1932 – present	Succeeded by All-Ireland Senior Camogie Championship 1993
