= 2002 National Camogie League =

Camogie tournament

National Camogie League 2002
Winners
- Champions: Galway (2nd title)
- Manager: Michael Kennedy
- Captain: Louise Curry

Runners-up
- Runners-up: Limerick

The 2002 National Camogie League is a competition in the women's team field sport of camogie was won by Galway, who defeated Limerick in the final, played at O'Connor Park, Tullamore.

== Arrangements ==
Limerick surprised reigning league champions Cork in the semi-final. Two goals from Denise Gilligan helped Galway beat Dublin by 3-9 to 1-6 to qualify for the final.

== Division 2 ==
The Junior National League, known since 2006 as Division Two, was won by Offaly who defeated Laois in the final.

== The Final ==
Sharon Glynn's three goals powered Galway to a landslide win over Limerick in the final at O'Connor Park in Tullamore.

Maire Ni Scolai wrote in the irish Independent:

Limerick couldn't cope with the goal scoring instincts of Glynn and her Galway colleagues Caroline Murray and Denise Gilligan. Meadhbh Nash played a stormer for Limerick in midfield, but they were denied several scoring chances by Galway's outstanding centre-back, Tracey Laheen.

Galway got off to a slow start and eight minutes had elapsed before their opening score, a fine Denise Gilligan point from play. Glynn struck for her first goal just before half time to put her side 1-3 to 0-3 ahead. Limerick began the second half in whirlwind fashion, scoring three quick points from Aine O'Connell (2) and Alison White to level the scores at 0-6 to 1-3. Glynn then struck for her second goal and followed with her third moment later, breaching the Limerick defence to set up Denise Gilligan for Galway's third goal. Marian Neville gave Limerick some hope when her long-range free went all the way to the Galway net to leave the scoreline at 3-3 to 1-6. However, two further goals from full-forward Caroline Murray sent Galway further ahead before Glynn completed her hat-trick from a penalty following a foul on Denise Gilligan.

=== Final stages ===
May 19
Final

| Galway | 6-6 – 1-7 | Limerick |
|---|---|---|
| S Glynn 3-0, C Murray 2-2, D Gilligan 1-2 A Connolly, T Maher 0-1 each. | | M Neville 1-0, E O'Brien 0-3, A O'Connell 0-2, A White, M Nash 0-1 each |

O'Connor Park, Tullamore

| Galway | Limerick |

Galway:
| GK | 1 | Louise Curry (Pearses) |
| RCB | 2 | Rita Broderick (Davitts) |
| FB | 3 | Pamela Nevin (Mullagh) |
| LCB | 4 | Olive Broderick (Davitts) |
| RWB | 5 | Martina Haverty (Pearses) |
| CB | 6 | Tracy Laheen (Pearses) |
| LWB | 7 | Martina Harkins (Pearses) |
| MF | 8 | Anna Hardiman (Mullagh) |
| MF | 9 | Fiona Healy (Mullagh) |
| RWF | 10 | Michelle Glynn (Pearses) |
| CF | 11 | Sharon Glynn (Pearses) 3-1 |
| LWF | 12 | Denise Gilligan (Craughwell) 1-1 |
| RCF | 13 | Aislinn Connolly (Castlegar) 1-1 |
| FF | 14 | Caroline Murray (St Thomas) 1-2 |
| LCF | 15 | Sandra Tannian (St Thomas) |
Substitutes:
| FF | | Therese Maher (Captain) (Athenry) for Healy (substituted in) 50' |
| FF | | Lourda Kavanagh (Davitts) for Tannion (substituted in) 50' |
| FF | | Carmel Hannon(Pearses) for Michelle Glynn (substituted in) 50' |
| FF | | Anna Broderick(Davitts) for Roisin Broderick (substituted in) 50' |
| FF | | Sherrie Mannion for Connolly (substituted in) 50' |

Limerick:
| GK | 1 | Marie Corkery |
| RCB | 2 | C Hayes |
| FB | 3 | Rose Collins |
| LCB | 4 | Pauline McCarthy |
| RWB | 5 | Michelle Casey 1-0 |
| CB | 6 | Marion Neville |
| LWB | 7 | Mairéad Kelly |
| MF | 8 | Vera Sheehan |
| MF | 9 | Meadhbh Nash 0-1 |
| RWF | 10 | Amanda Sheehan |
| CF | 11 | Aoife Sheehan |
| LWF | 12 | Ellen O'Brien 0-3 |
| RCF | 13 | Aine O'Connell 0-2 |
| FF | 14 | Marie Keating |
| LCF | 15 | Alison White 0-1 |

| Preceded by National Camogie League 2001 | National Camogie League; 1977 – present | Succeeded by National Camogie League 2003 |
