= 2023 All-Ireland Senior Camogie Championship =

Gaelic games season

All-Ireland Senior Camogie Championship 2023
Championship details
- Dates: 3 June – 6 August 2023
- Teams: 12

All-Ireland champions
- Winners: Cork (29th win)
- Captain: Amy O'Connor
- Manager: Matthew Twomey

All-Ireland runners-up
- Runners-up: Waterford
- Captain: Lorraine Bray
- Manager: Seán Power

Championship statistics
- Matches played: 25

The 2023 All-Ireland Senior Camogie Championship, known for sponsorship reasons as the Glen Dimplex Senior All-Ireland Championship, was the premier inter-county competition of the 2023 camogie season. Twelve county teams from Ireland competed. It was won by Cork, who defeated Waterford in the final.

== Format ==
Group stage

The twelve teams are drawn into three groups of four teams. Each team plays every other team in its group once, with 3 points are awarded for a win and 1 for a draw.

Knock-out stage

Two of the group winners (randomly chosen) advance to the semi-finals. The other group winner, and the three runners-up, play in the quarter-finals.

The bottom team in each group go into a draw and play-off to decide the team relegated to the 2024 Intermediate Championship.

== Group stage ==
=== Group 1 ===
Pos	Team	Pld	W	D	L	PF	PA	PD	Pts	Qualification
1	Galway	3	3	0	0	52	35	+17	9	Advance to All-Ireland semi-final
2	Cork	3	2	0	1	68	36	+32	6	Advance to All-Ireland quarter-final
3	Clare	3	1	0	2	43	61	−18	3	
4	Down	3	0	0	3	40	71	−31	0	Relegation playoff

Updated to match(es) played on 1 July 2023. Source: camogie.ie
Rules for classification: Tiebreakers

=== Group 2 ===
Pos	Team	Pld	W	D	L	PF	PA	PD	Pts	Qualification
1	Tipperary	3	2	1	0	63	35	+28	7	Advance to All-Ireland quarter-finals
2	Kilkenny	3	1	2	0	57	45	+12	5	Advance to All-Ireland quarter-finals
3	Dublin	3	1	0	2	36	61	−25	3	
4	Wexford	3	0	1	2	45	60	−15	1	Relegation playoff

Updated to match(es) played on 1 July 2023. Source: camogie.ie
Rules for classification: Tiebreakers

=== Group 3 ===
Pos	Team	Pld	W	D	L	PF	PA	PD	Pts	Qualification
1	Waterford	3	3	0	0	88	33	+55	9	Advance to All-Ireland semi-final
2	Antrim	3	2	0	1	53	60	−7	6	Advance to All-Ireland quarter-final
3	Limerick	3	1	0	2	55	48	+7	3	
4	Offaly (R)	3	0	0	3	32	87	−55	0	Relegation playoff

Updated to match(es) played on 1 July 2023. Source: camogie.ie
Rules for classification: Tiebreakers

== Knockout stage ==
=== Quarter-Finals ===
8 July 2023; 15:30 IST (UTC+1); Quarter-final	Tipperary	3-23 – 0-06	Antrim	Croke Park; Referee: Andy Larkin (Cork)
8 July 2023; 15:30 IST (UTC+1); Quarter-final	C Devine (2-6, 0-4 frees), E Heffernan (1-4), E McGrath (0-5 frees), C McIntyre (0-2), C Hennessy (0-1), C McCarthy (0-1), R Howard (0-1), Caoimhe Maher (0-1), G O’Brien (0-1)	Report	R McCormick (0-4, 3 frees), N Cosgrove (0-1 free), C Dobbin (0-1 free)	Croke Park; Referee: Andy Larkin (Cork)

9 July 2023; 13:30 IST (UTC+1); Quarter-final	Kilkenny	2-13 – 2-14	Cork	Croke Park; Referee: John Dermody (Westmeath)
9 July 2023; 13:30 IST (UTC+1); Quarter-final	D Gaule (1-10, 0-8 frees), A Prendergast (1-0), A Doyle (0-2), J Malone (0-1)	Report	A O'Connor (1-6, 0-5 frees, 0-1 45), K Mackey (1-2), S McCartan (0-2), C Healy (0-2), C Sigerson (0-1 free), H Looney (0-1)	Croke Park; Referee: John Dermody (Westmeath)

=== Semi-Finals ===
22 July 2023; 15:30 IST (UTC+1); Semi-final	Waterford	1-12 – 1-11	Tipperary	UPMC Nowlan Park; Attendance: 7,257; Referee: Liz Dempsey (Kilkenny)
22 July 2023; 15:30 IST (UTC+1); Semi-final	B Carton 0-8(4fs); M Power 1-0; A Flynn 0-2; A Fitzgerald, B O’Regan(f) 0-1 each	Report	C Devane 1-2(0-2fs); E McGrath 0-5(fs); R Howard, C Maher, G O’Brien, K Kennedy 0-1 each)	UPMC Nowlan Park; Attendance: 7,257; Referee: Liz Dempsey (Kilkenny)

22 July 2023; 17:30 IST (UTC+1); Semi-final	Galway	2-06 – 0-15	Cork	UPMC Nowlan Park; Attendance: 7,257; Referee: Ray Kelly (Kildare)
22 July 2023; 17:30 IST (UTC+1); Semi-final	Dolan 0-4(3fs); S McGrath 2-0; A Donohue 0-2	Report	A O’Connor 0-7(5fs, 1 45); K Mackey, C Healy 0-2 each; L Hayes, O Cahalane, C Sigerson(f), S McCarthy 0-1 each	UPMC Nowlan Park; Attendance: 7,257; Referee: Ray Kelly (Kildare)

=== Final ===
6 August 2023; 17:00 IST (UTC+1); 2023 All-Ireland Final	Waterford	0-09 – 5-13	Cork	Croke Park; Attendance: 30,191; Referee: John Dermody (Meath)
6 August 2023; 17:00 IST (UTC+1); 2023 All-Ireland Final	B Carton 0-7(5fs); N Rockett, L Forrest 0-1 each	Report	A O’Connor 3-7(0-5fs); S McCartan 1-1; F Keating 1-0; K Mackey 0-1; H Looney, C Sigerson (f), O Cahalane 0-1 each	Croke Park; Attendance: 30,191; Referee: John Dermody (Meath)

== Relegation playoffs ==
8 July 2023; 12:00 IST (UTC+1); Relegation semi-final	Down	0-15 – 1-16	Wexford	Fontenoy Park; Referee: Brian Kearney (Louth)
8 July 2023; 12:00 IST (UTC+1); Relegation semi-final		Report		Fontenoy Park; Referee: Brian Kearney (Louth)

15 July 2023; 12:00 IST (UTC+1); Relegation final	Offaly	0-06 – 1-12	Down	Sport Ireland Campus; Referee: Philip McDonald (Cavan)
15 July 2023; 12:00 IST (UTC+1); Relegation final	C Leahy (0-4, 3 frees), L Glynn (0-1), F Mulroney (0-1)	Report	SL Graffin (1-4), N Mallon (0-7, 2 frees), S Sands (0-1)	Sport Ireland Campus; Referee: Philip McDonald (Cavan)

Offaly are relegated to the All-Ireland Intermediate Camogie Championship for 2024.
