= 1993 All-Ireland Senior Camogie Championship =

Camogie championship

All-Ireland Senior Camogie Championship 1993
Championship details
- Dates: June – 26 September 1993

All-Ireland champions
- Winners: Cork (16th win)
- Captain: Linda Mellerick

All-Ireland runners-up
- Runners-up: Galway
- Captain: Deidre Costello
- Manager: Cyril Farrell

Championship statistics
- Matches played: 7

The 1993 All-Ireland Senior Camogie Championship was the high point of the 1993 season. The championship was won by Cork who defeated Galway by a ten-point margin in the final. The match drew an attendance of 5,400.

== Semi-finals ==
Collette O'Mahoney scored 3–5 as Cork beat Kilkenny in a high scoring and exciting semi-final, and substitute and Lyn Dunlea snatched an unlikely winning goal when completely surrounded by Kilkenny defenders to see Cork go through by a point, 5–10 to 2–18. Galway qualified for their first All-Ireland final since 1962, when they defeated Wexford in another high-scoring semi-final at Duggan Park.

== Final ==
Lyn Dunlea scored three goals in Cork's victory in the final. Croke Park resembled a building site as Cork won their second successive All Ireland. Desmond Fahy wrote in The Irish Times. :

The real difference between the sides was Cork’s deep well of experience. When the game hovered invitingly for both teams in the first five minutes of the second half, they were the side that were able to grasp it.

=== Final stages ===
August 15
Semi-Final

Cork	5-10 – 2-18	Kilkenny

Nowlan Park

August 15
Semi-Final

Galway	5-7 – 2-13	Wexford

Duggan Park

September 15
Final

Cork	3-15 – 1-8	Galway

Croke Park, Dublin

Cork	Galway

CORK:
GK	1	Kathleen Costine (Cloyne)
FB	2	Brenda Kenny
RWB	3	Paula Goggins (Inniscarra) (substituted off) 40'
CB	4	Therése O'Callaghan (Glen Rovers)
LWB	5	Liz Towler (0-1)
MF	6	Sandie Fitzgibbon (Glen Rovers) (0-2)
MF	7	Denise Cronin (Glen Rovers) (0-1)
MF	8	Linda Mellerick (Glen Rovers) (Capt)
RWF	9	Iren O'Leary (0-1) (substituted on) 28'
CF	10	Lyn Dunlea (Glen Rovers) (2-1)
LWF	11	Collette O'Mahoney (0-6)
FF	12	Fiona O'Driscoll (Fr O'Neill's) (0-3)
Substitutes:
RWF		Iren O'Keeffe (inniscarra) (1-0) for O'Leary (substituted on) 28'

GALWAY:
GK	1	Trace Laheen
FB	2	Sheila Coen
RWB	3	Carmel Allen
CB	4	Bride Stratford
LWB	5	Pamela Nevin
MF	6	Imelda Meagher (Athenry)
MF	7	Sharon Glynn (Pearses) (0-2)
MF	8	Dympna Meagher (0-1) (substituted off) 51'
RWF	9	Anne Ryan (0-1)
CF	10	Deidre Costello (Capt) (substituted off) 42'
LWF	11	Imelda Hobbins (Mullagh) (0-1)
FF	12	Claire Lynch (1-2)
Substitutes:
MF		Olive Broderick (Davitts) (0-1) for Costello (substituted on) 42'
MF		Brigid Fahy (1-0) for Maher (substituted on) 51'

MATCH RULES

- 50 minutes
- Replay if scores level
- Maximum of 3 substitutions

== See also ==
- Wikipedia List of Camogie players
- National Camogie League
- Camogie All Stars Awards
