= 2019 All-Ireland Senior Camogie Championship =

Gaelic games competition in Ireland

All-Ireland Senior Camogie Championship 2019
Championship details
- Dates: 15 June – 8 September 2019
- Teams: 11

All-Ireland champions
- Winners: Galway (3rd win)
- Captain: Sarah Dervan
- Manager: Cathal Murray

All-Ireland runners-up
- Runners-up: Kilkenny
- Captain: Meighan Farrell & Anna Farrell
- Manager: Ann Downey

Championship statistics
- Matches played: 30

The 2019 All-Ireland Senior Camogie Championship – known as the Liberty Insurance Camogie Championship for sponsorship reasons – is the premier inter-county competition of the 2019 camogie season.

The winners receive the O'Duffy Cup. The championship began on 15 June. It was won by Galway, who defeated Kilkenny in the final.

== Teams ==
Eleven county teams compete in the Senior Championship. 19 lower-ranked county teams compete in the Intermediate and Junior Championships.

== Format ==
Group stage

The eleven teams are drawn into two groups of five and six. Each team plays each other team in its group once. Three points are awarded for a win and one for a draw.

Knock-out stage

- The two group runners-up and the two third-placed teams play in two quarter-finals.
- The two group winners and the two quarter-final winners play in two semi-finals.
- The semi-final winners contest the 2019 All-Ireland Senior Camogie Championship Final

Relegation

- The two teams that finish last in their group play each other in a relegation playoff; the losers are relegated to the All-Ireland Intermediate Camogie Championship for 2020.

== Group stage ==
Key to colours
| Advance to semi-finals |
| Advance to quarter-finals |
| Relegation playoff |

Group games took place 15 June – 24 July 2019.

=== Group 1 ===
| Team | Pld | W | D | L | Diff | Pts |
|---|---|---|---|---|---|---|
| Kilkenny | 4 | 4 | 0 | 0 | +74 | 12 |
| Galway | 4 | 3 | 0 | 1 | +51 | 9 |
| Limerick | 4 | 2 | 0 | 2 | –12 | 6 |
| Offaly | 4 | 1 | 0 | 3 | –28 | 3 |
| Wexford | 4 | 0 | 0 | 4 | –85 | 0 |

=== Group 2 ===
| Team | Pld | W | D | L | Diff | Pts |
|---|---|---|---|---|---|---|
| Cork | 5 | 5 | 0 | 0 | +83 | 15 |
| Tipperary | 5 | 4 | 0 | 1 | +5 | 12 |
| Waterford | 5 | 3 | 0 | 2 | +11 | 9 |
| Dublin | 5 | 1 | 1 | 3 | –21 | 4 |
| Clare | 5 | 1 | 1 | 3 | –30 | 4 |
| Meath | 5 | 0 | 0 | 5 | –48 | 0 |

=== Relegation playoff ===
31 July 2019
Relegation Playoff
19:00 IST

| Meath | 4-9 – 4-13 | Wexford |
|---|---|---|
| | Report |

Conneff Park, Clane

Meath are relegated to the All-Ireland Intermediate Camogie Championship for 2020.

== Knock-out stage ==
=== Quarter-finals ===
3 August 2019
Quarter-Final
17:30 IST

| Limerick | 1-5 – 1-9 | Tipperary |
|---|---|---|
| N Mulcahy 1-2; C Costelloe 0-2; L Stack 0-1 | Report | C Devane 0-7(6fs, 1 45); N Treacy 1-0; E Fryday, O O'Dwyer, M Campion 0-1 each |

Semple Stadium, Thurles
Referee: Ray Kelly (Kildare)

3 August 2019
Quarter-Final
19:15 IST

| Galway | 2-16 – 2-8 | Waterford |
|---|---|---|
| C Dolan 0-10fs; A Donohue, A O’Reilly 1-0 each; N Kilkenny, N Coen 0-2 each; C Murphy, R Hennelly 0-1 each | Report | B Carton 1-4(0-2f, 0-1 45, 1-0 pen); S Curran 1-0(f); A Lyng 0-2; F Morrissey, N Rockett 0-1 each |

Semple Stadium, Thurles
Referee: Owen Elliott (Antrim)

=== Semi-finals ===
17 August 2019
Semi-Final
17:30 IST

| Kilkenny | 2-21 – 3-12 | Tipperary |
|---|---|---|
| M Quilty 1-9 (0-7fs); D Gaule 0-6(1f); A Dalton 1-1; K Power 0-2; E Keane, A Farrell, K Doyle 0-1 each | Report | C Devane 0-6(fs); E McDonald 0-3; A McGrath (free), O O’Dwyer, K Kennedy 1-0 each; Megan Ryan, N Treacy, E Fryday 0-1 each |

Gaelic Grounds, Limerick
Referee: John Dermody (Westmeath)

17 August 2019
Semi-Final
19:15 IST

| Cork | 1-10 – 0-14 | Galway |
|---|---|---|
| A O’Connor 0-4; O Cotter 0-3(fs); J White 1-0; O Cronin, K Mackey, L Collins 0-1 each | Report | C Dolan 0-5(3fs); N Kilkenny 0-3; A Donohue, C Cormican 0-2 each; N Hanniffy, A O’Reilly 0-1 each |

Gaelic Grounds, Limerick
Referee: Liz Dempsey (Kilkenny)

=== Final ===
RTÉ 2
Sky Sports

8 September 2019
16:15 IST
Final

Report

| Kilkenny | 0-17 (17) – (23) 3-14 | Galway |
|---|---|---|
(HT: 0-10 – 3-07)
| Pts: Michelle Quilty 8 (7f), Denise Gaule 3 (1f), Anne Dalton 2 (1f), Miriam Walsh 1, Davina Tobin 1, Anna Farrell 1, Aoife Doyle 1 | | Gls: Ailish O'Reilly 2, Niamh Hannify 1 Pts: Carrie Dolan 6 (5f, 1 '45), Niamh Kilkenny 4, Sarah Healy 1, Catherine Finnerty 1, Sarah Spellman 1, Noreen Coen 1 |

Croke Park, Dublin
Referee: Ray Kelly (Kildare)
Attendance: 24,730
