= 2016 All-Ireland Senior Camogie Championship final =

2016 All-Ireland Senior Camogie Final
- Event: 2016 All-Ireland Senior Camogie Championship
Kilkenny	Cork
1-13	1-9
- Date: 11 September 2016
- Venue: Croke Park, Dublin
- Player of the Match: Julie Ann Malone (Kilkenny)
- Referee: Éamon Cassidy (Limavady, Derry)
- Attendance: 20,037
- Weather: 17°C, cloudy

The 2016 All-Ireland Senior Camogie Championship Final, the 85th event of its type and the culmination of the 2016 All-Ireland Senior Camogie Championship, was played at Croke Park on 11 September.

== Paths to the final ==
Cork had group stage wins v Wexford, Limerick, Waterford and Clare and a loss v Offaly, then beat Wexford by 4 points in the semi. A Cork win would be 3-in-a-row.

Kilkenny had group stage wins v Tipperary, Dublin and Derry and a loss v Galway, then beat Offaly by 11 points in the quarter-final, and Galway by 2 points in the semi. Kilkenny have not won the All-Ireland since 1994, and have lost 6 All-Ireland finals since then.

== Details ==
11 September 2016
4 p.m.

Kilkenny	1-13 - 1-9	Cork

Croke Park, Dublin
Attendance: 20,037
Referee: Éamon Cassidy (Derry)
