= 2025 All-Ireland Senior Camogie Championship =

Gaelic games season

All-Ireland Senior Camogie Championship 2025
Championship details
- Dates: 24 May – 10 August, 2025
- Teams: 10

All-Ireland champions
- Winners: Galway (5th win)
- Captain: Carrie Dolan
- Manager: Cathal Murray

All-Ireland runners-up
- Runners-up: Cork
- Captain: Méabh Cahalane
- Manager: Ger Manley

Championship statistics
- Matches played: 26

The 2025 All-Ireland Senior Camogie Championship, known for sponsorship reasons as the Glen Dimplex Senior All-Ireland Championship, was the premier inter-county competition of the 2025 camogie season. Ten county teams from Ireland competed. Cork were aiming to complete a three-in-a-row, which has not been achieved since Wexford did so in 2010–12.

After protests in the 2025 Leinster Camogie semi final and 2025 Munster Camogie final a vote was held on 22 May about whether players should be given the option of playing in shorts. The motion was passed, allowing players to wear shorts or skorts.

Galway were the winners, defeating Cork by a point in the final.

== Format ==
Group stage

The ten teams are drawn into two groups of five teams. Each team plays every other team in its group once, with 3 points are awarded for a win and 1 for a draw.

Knock-out stage

The two group winners advance to the semi-finals. The second- and third-placed teams advance to the quarter-finals.

The bottom teams in each group play off, with the loser relegated to the All-Ireland Intermediate Camogie Championship.

== Group stage ==
=== Group 1 ===
Pos	Team	Pld	W	D	L	PF	PA	PD	Pts	Qualification
1	Cork	4	4	0	0	130	40	+90	12	Advance to All-Ireland semi-final
2	Tipperary	4	3	0	1	118	55	+63	9	Advance to All-Ireland quarter-final
3	Clare	4	1	1	2	49	74	−25	4	Advance to All-Ireland quarter-final
4	Limerick	4	1	1	2	38	103	−65	4	
5	Wexford	4	0	0	4	40	103	−63	0	Relegation playoff

Source: camogie.ie
Rules for classification: Tiebreakers

=== Group 2 ===
Pos	Team	Pld	W	D	L	PF	PA	PD	Pts	Qualification
1	Galway (C)	4	4	0	0	89	37	+52	12	Advance to All-Ireland semi-final
2	Waterford	4	3	0	1	101	46	+55	9	Advance to All-Ireland quarter-final
3	Kilkenny	4	2	0	2	79	63	+16	6	Advance to All-Ireland quarter-final
4	Dublin	4	1	0	3	83	79	+4	3	
5	Derry (R)	4	0	0	4	30	157	−127	0	Relegation playoff

Source: camogie.ie
Rules for classification: Tiebreakers
(C) All-Ireland champions; (R) Relegated

== Relegation playoff ==
5 July 2025
14:00
Relegation playoff

Report

Wexford	4-21 (33) – (9) 0-09	Derry

Louth GAA Training Centre Darver, Dundalk
Referee: Barry Nea

Derry are relegated to the All-Ireland Intermediate Camogie Championship for 2026.

== Knockout stage ==
=== Bracket ===
Quarter-Finals
Kilkenny	0-19
Tipperary (a.e.t.)	1-22
Clare	2-10
Waterford	2-20

Semi-Finals
Galway	1-18
Tipperary	1-11
Cork	1-21
Waterford	1-11

Final
Galway	1-14
Cork	1-13

=== Quarter-Finals ===
5 July 2025
14:30
Quarter-final

Report

Waterford	2-20 (26) – (16) 2-10	Clare
(HT: 1-11 – 2-05)

Croke Park, Dublin
Referee: Liz Dempsey

6 July 2025
13:30
Quarter-final

Report

Tipperary	1-22 (25) – (19) 0-19 (a.e.t.)	Kilkenny

Croke Park, Dublin
Referee: Ray Kelly

=== Semi-Finals ===
RTÉ 2

26 July 2025
15:00
Semi-final

Report

Galway	1-18 (21) – (14) 1-11	Tipperary
(HT: 0-9 – 1-6)

Nowlan Park, Kilkenny
Referee: Justin Heffernan (Wexford)
Attendance: 7,120 (double-header)

RTÉ 2

26 July 2025
17:00
Semi-final

Report

Cork	1-21 (24) – (14) 1-11	Waterford
(HT: 0-9 – 1-7)
Gls: O Mullins 1 Pts: S McCarthy 7 (4fs), K Mackey 4, A O’Connor 3 (2fs, 1 45), O Mullins 2, E Murphy 2, S McCartan 2, L Hayes 1		Gls: B Carton 1 Pts: N Rockett 5 (3fs), B Carton 4, A Flynn 1, L Bray 1

Nowlan Park, Kilkenny
Referee: Gavin Donegan (Dublin)
Attendance: 7,120 (double-header)

=== Final ===
RTÉ 2

August 10, 2025
17:15 IST (UTC+1)
Final

Report

Galway	1-14 (17) – (16) 1-13	Cork
(HT: 1-9 – 0-7)
Gls: M Dillon 1 Pts: C Dolan 7fs, A O'Reilly 3, A O'Donoghue 2, N Mallon 1, C Kelly 1		Gls: O Cahalane 1 Pts: S McCarthy 4fs, A O'Connor 3 (2fs, 1 45), E Murphy 2, A Thompson 2, H Looney 1, L Hayes 1 (red card) H Looney

Croke Park, Dublin
Referee: Justin Heffernan (Wexford)
Attendance: 28,795
