= 1993 All-Ireland Senior Camogie Championship final =

1993 All-Ireland Senior Camogie Final
- Event: All-Ireland Senior Camogie Championship 1993
Cork	Galway
3–15	2–8
- Date: 26 September 1993
- Venue: Croke Park, Dublin
- Referee: Miriam O'Callaghan (Offaly)
- Attendance: 5,700

The 1993 All-Ireland Senior Camogie Championship Final, the 62nd event of its type, is the culmination of the 1993 All-Ireland Senior Camogie Championship.

Cork led 1–7 to 1–5 at half-time and their superior experience showed in the end. The Downey sisters got 1–9 between them.
