= 1997 All-Ireland Senior Camogie Championship final =

1997 All-Ireland Senior Camogie Final
- Event: All-Ireland Senior Camogie Championship 1997
Cork	Galway
0-15	2-5
- Date: 8 September 1997
- Venue: Croke Park, Dublin
- Referee: Biddy Phillips (Tipperary)
- Attendance: 10,212

The 1997 All-Ireland Senior Camogie Championship Final, the 66th event of its type, is the culmination of the 1997 All-Ireland Senior Camogie Championship.

Cork had a four-point win over Galway with 2 goals for Galway.
