= 1996 All-Ireland Senior Camogie Championship final =

Senior Camogie Championship

1996 All-Ireland Senior Camogie Final
- Event: All-Ireland Senior Camogie Championship 1996
Galway	Cork
4-8	1-15
- Date: 22 September 1996
- Venue: Croke Park, Dublin
- Referee: Áine Derham (Dublin)
- Attendance: 10,235

The 1996 All-Ireland Senior Camogie Championship Final, the 65th event of its type, is the culmination of the 1996 All-Ireland Senior Camogie Championship.

Cork led 1-9 to 1-6 at half-time, but went on to rue missed chances. After half-time Galway scored three goals in the second half.
