= 2024 All-Ireland Senior Camogie Championship =

Gaelic games season

All-Ireland Senior Camogie Championship 2024
Championship details
- Dates: 25 May – 11 August 2024
- Teams: 12

All-Ireland champions
- Winners: Cork (30th win)
- Captain: Molly Lynch
- Manager: Ger Manley

All-Ireland runners-up
- Runners-up: Galway
- Captain: Roisín Black
- Manager: Cathal Murray

Championship statistics
- Matches played: 35

The 2024 All-Ireland Senior Camogie Championship, known for sponsorship reasons as the Glen Dimplex Senior All-Ireland Championship, is the premier inter-county competition of the 2024 camogie season. Twelve county teams from Ireland compete.

== Format ==
Group stage

The twelve teams are drawn into two groups of six teams. Each team plays every other team in its group once, with 3 points are awarded for a win and 1 for a draw.

Knock-out stage

The two group winners advance to the semi-finals. The second- and third-placed teams advance to the quarter-finals.

The bottom team in each group is relegated to the 2025 Intermediate Championship.

== Group stage ==
=== Group 1 ===
Pos	Team	Pld	W	D	L	GF	GA	GD	Pts	Qualification
1	Tipperary	5	5	0	0	136	59	+77	15	Advance to All-Ireland semi-final
2	Kilkenny	5	3	1	1	115	54	+61	10	Advance to All-Ireland quarter-final
3	Waterford	5	3	1	1	116	64	+52	10	Advance to All-Ireland quarter-final
4	Derry	5	2	0	3	71	119	−48	6	
5	Limerick	5	1	0	4	55	131	−76	3	
6	Antrim	5	0	0	5	63	129	−66	0	Relegation

Source: rte.ie
Rules for classification: Tiebreakers

=== Group 2 ===
Pos	Team	Pld	W	D	L	PF	PA	PD	Pts	Qualification
1	Cork	5	5	0	0	132	41	+91	15	Advance to All-Ireland semi-final
2	Galway	5	3	1	1	121	68	+53	10	Advance to All-Ireland quarter-final
3	Dublin	5	3	0	2	94	79	+15	9	Advance to All-Ireland quarter-final
4	Clare	5	2	0	3	58	93	−35	6	
5	Wexford	5	1	1	3	90	89	+1	4	
6	Down	5	0	0	5	35	160	−125	0	Relegation

Source: rte.ie
Rules for classification: Tiebreakers

== Knockout stage ==
=== Bracket ===
Quarter-Finals
Kilkenny	0-12
Dublin	1-13
Galway	1-12
Waterford	1-9

Semi-Finals
Cork	4-17
Dublin	0-9
Tipperary	1-11
Galway	1-12

Final
Cork	1-16
Galway	0-16

=== Quarter-finals ===
RTÉ One

6 July 2024
12:30 IST (UTC+1)
Quarter-final

Report

Kilkenny	0-12 (12) – (16) 1-13	Dublin

Croke Park, Dublin
Referee: Andy Larkin (Cork)

7 July 2024
13:30 IST (UTC+1)
Quarter-final

Report

Galway	1-12 (15) – (12) 1-09	Waterford
(HT: 0-7 – 0-5)

Croke Park, Dublin

=== Semi-finals ===
27 July 2024
13:15 IST (UTC+1)
Semi-final

Report

Cork	4-27 (29) – (9) 0-09	Dublin
(HT: 1-10 – 0-2)

Nowlan Park, Kilkenny
Referee: Justin Heffernan (Wexford)

27 July 2024
15:00 IST (UTC+1)
Semi-final

Report

Tipperary	1-11 (14) – (15) 1-12	Galway
(HT: 1-6 – 0-7)

Nowlan Park, Kilkenny
Referee: Liz Dempsey (Kilkenny)

=== Final ===
11 August 2024
17:15 IST (UTC+1)
2024 All-Ireland Final

Report

Cork	1-16 (19) – (16) 0-16	Galway
(HT: 0-09 – 0-10)
Gls: K Mackey 1 Pts: A O’Connor 3fs, S McCarthy 3, O Cahalane 2, S McCartan 2, K Mackey 2, F Keating 1, C Healy 1, A Thompson 1, C Finn 1		Pts: C Dolan 8fs, A Donoghue 4, A O’Reilly 2, N Mallon 1, C Hickey 1

Croke Park, Dublin
Referee: Liz Dempsey (Kilkenny)
Attendance: 27,811
