= 2016 All-Ireland Senior Camogie Championship =

Camogie championship

All-Ireland Senior Camogie Championship 2016
Championship details
- Dates: 18 June – 11 September 2016
- Teams: 11

All-Ireland champions
- Winners: Kilkenny (13th win)
- Captain: Michelle Quilty
- Manager: Ann Downey

All-Ireland runners-up
- Runners-up: Cork
- Captain: Ashling Thompson
- Manager: Paudie Murray

Championship statistics
- Matches played: 30

The 2016 All-Ireland Senior Camogie Championship – known as the Liberty Insurance All-Ireland Senior Camogie Championship for sponsorship reasons – is the premier inter-county senior camogie competition.

The winners receive the O'Duffy Cup.

The championship began on 18 June.

== Teams ==
Eleven county teams compete in the Senior Championship (tier 1). Sixteen lower-ranked county teams plus the second teams of tier 1 counties compete in the Intermediate (tier 2) and Junior (tier 3) Championships.

== Format ==
Group Stage

The eleven teams are drawn into one group of six and one group of five. All the teams play each other once. Three points are awarded for a win and one for a draw.

Knock-out stage

- The two group runners-up and the two third-placed teams play in two quarter-finals.
- The two group winners and the two quarter-final winners play in two semi-finals.
- The semi-final winners contest the 2016 All-Ireland Senior Camogie Championship Final

== Group stage ==
Key to colours
Advance to semi-finals
Advance to quarter-finals

=== Group 1 ===
==== Table ====
Team	Pld	W	D	L	F	A	Diff	Pts
Cork	5	4	0	1	114	51	+63	12
Wexford	5	4	0	1	102	70	+32	12
Offaly	5	4	0	1	89	73	+16	12
Limerick	5	2	0	3	80	91	–11	6
Waterford	5	1	0	4	58	96	–38	3
Clare	5	0	0	5	51	113	–62	0

Tie-Breaker

If only two teams are level on league points -

- The team that won the head-to-head match is ranked first
- If this game was a draw, score difference (total scored minus total conceded in all games) is used to rank the teams
- If score difference is identical, total scored is used to rank the teams
- If still identical, a play-off is required

If three or more teams are level on league points, score difference is used to rank the teams.

==== Rounds 1 to 5 ====
===== Round 1 =====
18 June 2016
Round 1

Clare	1-11 - 1-16	Offaly

Sixmilebridge
18 June 2016
Round 1

Waterford	0-9 - 2-16	Cork

Walsh Park
18 June 2016
Round 1

Wexford	3-17 - 1-16	Limerick

Innovate Wexford Park

===== Round 2 =====
25 June 2016
Round 2

Cork	v	Clare

Páirc Uí Rinn
25 June 2016
Round 2

Limerick	v	Waterford

Kilmallock
25 June 2016
Round 2

Offaly	v	Wexford

St Brendan's Park, Birr

===== Round 3 =====
2 July 2016
Round 3

Clare	v	Limerick

2 July 2016
Round 3

Cork	v	Offaly

2 July 2016
Round 3

Waterford	v	Wexford

===== Round 4 =====
July 2016
Round 4

v

July 2016
Round 4

v

July 2016
Round 4

v

===== Round 5 =====
July 2016
Round 5

v

July 2016
Round 5

v

July 2016
Round 5

v

=== Group 2 ===
==== Table ====
Team	Pld	W	D	L	F	A	Diff	Pts
Galway	4	4	0	0	75	34	+41	12
Kilkenny	4	3	0	1	91	45	+46	9
Tipperary	4	1	1	2	66	63	+3	4
Dublin	4	1	1	2	63	62	+1	4
Derry	4	0	0	4	25	116	–91	0

==== Rounds 1 to 5 ====
===== Round 1 =====
18 June 2016
Round 1

Derry	2-3 - 5-24	Kilkenny

18 June 2016
Round 1

Galway	1-13 - 1-10	Tipperary

===== Round 2 =====
June 2016
Round 2

v

June 2016
Round 2

v

===== Round 3 =====
2 July 2016
Round 3

Tipperary	0-11 - 1-21	Kilkenny

June 2016
Round 3

v

===== Round 4 =====
July 2016
Round 3

v

July 2016
Round 3

v

===== Round 5 =====
July 2016
Round 3

v

July 2016
Round 3

v

== Knock-out Stage ==
=== All-Ireland Quarter-Finals ===
The second team in group 1 plays the third team in group 2 and the third team in group 1 plays the second team in group 2. All matches are knock-out.

30 July 2016
Quarter-Final

Wexford	2-11 - 0-16	Tipperary

Walsh Park, Waterford

30 July 2016
Quarter-Final

Offaly	0-11 - 1-19	Kilkenny

MacDonagh Park, Nenagh

=== All-Ireland Semi-Finals ===
The winners of groups 1 and 2 play the winners of the two quarter-finals. All matches are knock-out

13 August 2016
2 p.m.
Semi-Final

Cork	0-19 - 0-15	Wexford

Semple Stadium, Thurles

13 August 2016
3:45 p.m.
Semi-Final

Galway	1-19 - 3-15	Kilkenny

Semple Stadium, Thurles

=== All-Ireland final ===
11 September
4:00 p.m.
Final

Kilkenny	1-13 - 1-9	Cork
D Gaule 0-7(fs), J A Malone 0-4, S Farrell 1-0, M Farrell, K Power 0-1 each	Report	O Cotter 1-2 (1-1fs), K Mackey 0-2, A Murray (pen), A Thompson, H Looney, E O’Sullivan, L Coppinger 0-1 each

Croke Park, Dublin
Attendance: 20,037
Referee: Éamon Cassidy (Derry)

Preceded by All-Ireland Senior Camogie Championship 2015	All-Ireland Senior Camogie Championship; 1932 – present	Succeeded by All-Ireland Senior Camogie Championship 2017
