= 1998 All-Ireland Senior Camogie Championship final =

1998 All-Ireland Senior Camogie Final
- Event: All-Ireland Senior Camogie Championship 1998
Cork	Galway
2-13	0-15
- Date: 6 September 1998
- Venue: Croke Park, Dublin
- Referee: John Morrissey (Tipperary)
- Attendance: 10,436

The 1998 All-Ireland Senior Camogie Championship Final, the 67th event of its type, is the culmination of the 1998 All-Ireland Senior Camogie Championship.

It was the first ever Bord na Gaeilge All-Ireland Senior Camogie Championsnip Final to be broadcast live on RTÉ television. Cork and Galway played and won.
