= 2006 All-Ireland Senior Camogie Championship final =

2006 All-Ireland Senior Camogie Final
- Event: All-Ireland Senior Camogie Championship 2006
Cork	Tipperary
0-12	0-4
- Date: 10 September 2006
- Venue: Croke Park, Dublin
- Referee: Fintan McNamara (Clare)
- Attendance: 20,685

The 2006 All-Ireland Senior Camogie Championship Final, the 75th event of its type, is the culmination of the 2006 All-Ireland Senior Camogie Championship.

Cork's comprehensive win marked the end of the great Tipperary teams; Tipp only scored one point in the second half. This was also the first goalless final.
