= 2013 All-Ireland Senior Camogie Championship =

Camogie championship

All-Ireland Senior Camogie Championship 2013
Championship details
- Dates: 22 June — 15 September 2013
- Teams: 9

All-Ireland champions
- Winners: Galway (2nd win)
- Captain: Lorraine Ryan
- Manager: Tony Ward

All-Ireland runners-up
- Runners-up: Kilkenny
- Captain: Michelle Quilty
- Manager: Graham Dillon

Championship statistics
- Matches played: 22

The 2013 All-Ireland Senior Camogie Championship—known as the Liberty Insurance All-Ireland Senior Camogie Championship for sponsorship reasons— is the premier competition of the 2013 camogie season. It commenced on 22 June 2013 and ended with the final on 15 September won by Galway. Nine county teams compete in the Senior Championship out of twenty-seven who compete overall in the Senior, Intermediate and Junior Championships.

== Structure ==
The nine teams are drawn into two groups, one of five teams (Group 1) and one of four (Group 2). All the teams play each other once, scoring two points for a win and one for a draw.

- The two group runners-up and the two third-placed teams play in the quarter-finals.
- The two group winners and the two quarter-final winners play in the semi-finals.
- The semi-final winners contest the 2013 All-Ireland Senior Camogie Championship Final

== Results ==
=== Group stages ===
Key to colours
Advance to semi-finals
Advance to quarter-finals

==== Group 1 ====
Team	Pld	W	D	L	F	A	Diff	Pts
Kilkenny	4	4	0	0	77	45	+32	8
Galway	4	3	0	1	68	48	+20	6
Wexford	4	2	0	2	60	50	+10	4
Clare	4	1	0	3	57	62	–5	2
Derry	4	0	0	4	37	94	–57	0

==== Group 2 ====
Team	Pld	W	D	L	F	A	Diff	Pts
Cork	3	3	0	0	78	22	+56	6
Offaly	3	2	0	1	50	34	+16	4
Tipperary	3	1	0	2	40	51	–11	2
Dublin	3	0	0	3	21	82	–61	0

=== Final stages ===
3 August 2013
Quarter-Final
1:45 p.m. IST

Offaly	1-10 – 1-11	Wexford

O'Moore Park, Portlaoise

3 August 2013
Quarter-Final
3:30 p.m. IST

Galway	2-19 – 0-9	Tipperary

O'Moore Park, Portlaoise

17 August 2013
Semi-Final
2:00 p.m. IST

Cork	2-11 – 2-12	Kilkenny

Semple Stadium, Thurles

17 August 2013
Semi-Final
4:00 p.m. IST

Galway	1-12 – 0-6	Wexford

Semple Stadium, Thurles

==== All-Ireland final ====
15 September 2013
4:00 p.m. IST

Galway	1-9 – 0-7	Kilkenny
Niamh McGrath 0-5 (4f); Ailish O'Reilly 1-0; Noreen Coen 0-2; Emer Haverty, Emma Kilkelly 0-1 each	Report	Shelly Farrell, Ann Dalton (1f), Michelle Quilty (2f) 0-2 each; Aisling Dunphy 0-1

Croke Park, Dublin
Attendance: 15,063
Referee: Ger O'Dowd (Limerick)

Preceded by All-Ireland Senior Camogie Championship 2012	All-Ireland Senior Camogie Championship; 1932 – present	Succeeded by All-Ireland Senior Camogie Championship 2014
