= 2021 All-Ireland Senior Camogie Championship final =

Gaelic sports match

2021 All-Ireland Senior Camogie Championship Final
- Event: 2021 All-Ireland Senior Camogie Championship
Cork	Galway
1-12	1-15
- Date: 12 September 2021
- Venue: Croke Park, Dublin
- Referee: Liz Dempsey (Kilkenny)

The 2021 All-Ireland Senior Camogie Championship Final, the 90th event of its kind and the culmination of the 2021 All-Ireland Senior Camogie Championship, was played at Croke Park on 12 September 2021. Galway defeated Cork in the final to claim their 5th title.

== Details ==
RTÉ 2
Sky Sports

12 September 2021
16:15
Final

Report

Cork	1-12 (15) – (18) 1-15	Galway
(HT: 0-8 - 0-9)
Gls: K Mackey; Pts: O Cronin 6(4fs), K Mackey 1, H Looney 2, A Thompson 1, C Sigerson 1, A O’Connor 1		Gls: S McGrath; Pts: C Dolan 6(6fs), S McGrath 2, N Kilkenny 2, O McGrath, A O’Reilly 2(1f), A Donohue 1

Croke Park, Dublin
Referee: Liz Dempsey (Kilkenny)
