= 2008 All-Ireland Senior Camogie Championship final =

2008 All-Ireland Senior Camogie Final
- Event: All-Ireland Senior Camogie Championship 2008
Cork	Galway
2-10	1-8
- Date: 14 September 2008
- Venue: Croke Park, Dublin
- Referee: Eamonn Browne (Tipperary)
- Attendance: 18,727

The 2008 All-Ireland Senior Camogie Championship Final, the 77th event of its type, is the culmination of the 2008 All-Ireland Senior Camogie Championship.

Cork won their third title in four years, after Galway missed several goal chances, although, Galway scored one the opponent nailed two.
