= 2018 All-Ireland Senior Camogie Championship final =

2018 All-Ireland Senior Camogie Championship Final
- Event: 2018 All-Ireland Senior Camogie Championship
Kilkenny	Cork
0-13	0-14
- Date: 9 September 2018
- Venue: Croke Park, Dublin
- Referee: Eamon Cassidy (Derry)
- Weather: 17 °C, sunny

The 2018 All-Ireland Senior Camogie Championship Final, the 87th event of its kind and the culmination of the 2018 All-Ireland Senior Camogie Championship, was played at Croke Park in Dublin on 9 September 2018.

It was the third Cork–Kilkenny final in a row, and was won by Cork by one point.

== Details ==
9 September 2018
16:15 IST

Kilkenny	0-13 – 0-14	Cork
Denise Gaule 0-10 (7f, 2 '65'); Julia Ann Malone, Meghan Farrell, Michelle Quilty 0-1 each	Report	Orla Cotter 0-5f; Chloe Sigerson 0-3f; Katrina Mackey, Orla Cronin 0-2 each; Aoife Murray (pen), Amy O’Connor 0-1 each

Croke Park, Dublin
Attendance: 21,453
Referee: Eamon Cassidy (Derry)
