= 1940 All-Ireland Senior Camogie Championship final =

1940 All-Ireland Senior Camogie Final
- Event: All-Ireland Senior Camogie Championship 1940
| Cork | Galway |
| 4-1 | 2-2 |
- Date: 14 October 1940
- Venue: Croke Park, Dublin
- Referee: Vera Campbell (Tyrone)
- Attendance: 3,000

The 1940 All-Ireland Senior Camogie Championship Final was the ninth All-Ireland Final and the deciding match of the 1940 All-Ireland Senior Camogie Championship, an inter-county camogie tournament for the top teams in Ireland.

The game opened cagily, both teams scoring just one point in the first 15 minutes. Cork then scored four goals (M. Fitzgerald (two), P. Hegarty, M. Buckley) in four minutes, essentially deciding the game before half-time. They did not score in the second half but won by nine points.
