= 1945 All-Ireland Senior Camogie Championship final =

1945 All-Ireland Senior Camogie Final
- Event: All-Ireland Senior Camogie Championship 1945
Antrim	Waterford
5-2	3-2
- Date: 30 September 1945
- Venue: Cappoquin Sports Field, Cappoquin
- Referee: Frank Gleeson (Tipperary)
- Attendance: 2,500

The 1945 All-Ireland Senior Camogie Championship Final was the fourteenth All-Ireland Final and the deciding match of the 1945 All-Ireland Senior Camogie Championship, an inter-county camogie tournament for the top teams in Ireland.

The game was tied at half-time, 2-2 each, but Antrim finished stronger to make up for the previous year's disappointment.
