= 1939 All-Ireland Senior Camogie Championship final =

1939 All-Ireland Senior Camogie Final
- Event: All-Ireland Senior Camogie Championship 1939
Cork	Galway
6-1	1-1
- Date: 12 November 1939
- Venue: Croke Park, Dublin
- Referee: V. Campbell (Tyrone)
- Attendance: 5,000

The 1939 All-Ireland Senior Camogie Championship Final was the eighth All-Ireland Final and the deciding match of the 1939 All-Ireland Senior Camogie Championship, an inter-county camogie tournament for the top teams in Ireland.

Cork had an easy win over the inexperienced Galway team.
