= 2015 All-Ireland Senior Camogie Championship final =

2015 All-Ireland Senior Camogie Final
- Event: 2015 All-Ireland Senior Camogie Championship
Cork	Galway
1-13	0-09
- Date: 13 September 2015
- Venue: Croke Park, Dublin
- Referee: Ray Kelly (Kildare)
- Weather: Dry

The 2015 All-Ireland Senior Camogie Championship Final, the 84th event of its type and the culmination of the 2015 All-Ireland Senior Camogie Championship, was played at Croke Park on 13 September.

Cork won 1-13 to 0-9 v Galway.
