= Amy O'Connor =

Irish camogie player

Personal information
- Born: 19 January 1996 (age 30)
- Occupation: Pharmacist/project manager

Sport
- Sport: Camogie
- Position: Right Corner Forward
Clubs
- Years: Club
- St. Vincent's (camogie club); Seandún (divisional side)
Club titles
- Cork titles: 2
College
- Years: College
- 2014-2018: University College Cork
Inter-county
- Years: County
- 2014-present: Cork
Inter-county titles
- All-Irelands: 6
- All Stars: 4

Amy O'Connor (born 1996 or 1997) is an Irish camogie player who plays for her club, St Vincent's GAA, in Cork and at inter-county level with the Cork Senior camogie team. Since her senior inter-county debut in 2014, she has won six Senior All-Ireland Camogie Championships with Cork (2014, 2015, 2017, 2018, 2023 and 2024), captaining the winning team in 2023. As of 2022, she had won six Munster Senior Camogie Championship medals. She was the recipient of Camogie All-Star awards in 2019, 2023, 2024 and 2025.

== Sporting career ==
O'Connor played soccer at an international level, and was a member of the Republic of Ireland women's national under-19 football team that reached the semi-final of the 2014 UEFA Women's Under-19 Championship.

She participated in the Cork County Camogie Championship in 2021, as a member of the divisional team Seandún which beat Inniscarra on a score of 2–11 to 0–13 - to which she contributed 2-1. Seandún won the 2022 final against Sarsfields on a score of 2–16 to 1–17, with O'Connor contributing 2-8 and being awarded "player of the match" on the day.

In the 2023 All-Ireland Senior Camogie Championship final, O'Connor scored 3 goals in under two minutes with a final tally of 3-7 earning her the "player of the match" on the day and subsequently the PwC GPA "women's player of the month" award in August 2023. In October 2023, she picked up the 96FM/C103 Rochestown Park Hotel Monthly GAA award. She was then named overall winner (for the year) at the 96FM/C103 Cork GAA Sports Star of the Year awards in January 2024.

== Personal life and education ==
O'Connor, who is from Knocknaheeny, attended St Vincent's Secondary School in Cork city. She is a qualified pharmacist, with a bachelors degree in Pharmacy from University College Cork (UCC), which she attended on a Quercus Sports' Scholarship. She is also a graduate of the Royal College of Surgeons in Ireland, with a Masters in Pharmacy. As of 2023, she was working as a project manager at a software company.
