= 2013 All-Ireland Senior Camogie Championship final =

2013 All-Ireland Senior Camogie Final
- Event: All-Ireland Senior Camogie Championship 2013
Galway	Kilkenny
1-9	0-7
- Date: 15 September 2013
- Venue: Croke Park, Dublin
- Referee: Ger O'Dowd (Limerick)

The 2013 All-Ireland Senior Camogie Championship Final, the 82nd event of its type, is the culmination of the 2013 All-Ireland Senior Camogie Championship.

Galway defeated Kilkenny.
