= Sandie Fitzgibbon =

Irish camogie player

Personal information
- Native name: Alastríona Ni Giobúin (Irish)
- Born: 1956 or 1957 (age 69–70) Cork, Ireland
- Height: 5 ft 6 in (168 cm)

Sport
- Sport: Camogie
- Position: centre-back
Club
- Years: Club
- 1973–1999: Glen Rovers
Inter-county
- Years: County
- 1982–1997: Cork
Inter-county titles
- All-Irelands: 6
- All Stars: 2004 Team of Century

Sandie Fitzgibbon (born 1964 in Cork) is a former camogie player selected on the camogie team of the century in 2004, and winner of six All Ireland medals in 1982, 1983, 1992, 1993, 1995 and 1997. Also a former player for the Ireland women's national basketball team.

She played for Glen Rovers Club with whom she won four All Ireland Club Championships. She also holds one Colleges All Ireland, three Minor All Ireland, seven National League and two Gael Linn interprovincial medals. She captained Cork to victory in 1992 when they defeated Wexford.

Her camogie awards include Munster Young Camogie Player for 1983, National Irish Bank Player of the Year in 1992 and 1995, and twice Jury's Hotel Sports Star of the Month. In 2000, she received the Cork Lord Mayor's Millennium Camogie Award.

In 2013, she was given a Northside and District Hall of Fame Award.

== Citation ==
Her team of the century citation read: "possessing huge natural sporting ability, compact and tidy in her movements, allied to great speed, she was a most influential player who could control a game with ease. Sandie was very polished performer whether at midfield or centre-back."

== Other sports ==
Her basketball awards include three National Cup and five National League titles, 64 senior basketball caps for Ireland, and the Delta Air Lines Olympic Award.
