= Denise Gilligan =

Personal information
- Native name: Denís Nic Giollagáin (Irish)
- Born: Galway, Ireland

Sport
- Sport: Camogie
Club*
Years	Club	Apps (scores)
	Tara Camogie London	?
Inter-county**
Years	County	Apps (scores)
	Galway and London	?
- * club appearances and scores correct as of (16:31, 30 June 2010 (UTC)). **Inter County team apps and scores correct as of (16:31, 30 June 2010 (UTC)).

Denise Gilligan (born 1978 or 1979) is a camogie player, from Galway, who was part of the team that won the 1996 All-Ireland Senior Camogie Championship.

== Career ==
Gilligan scored two goals for Galway in their breakthrough 1996 All Ireland final victory over Cork. In 1998, she almost repeated the goal-scoring performance when Galway lost to Cork in the last 12-a-side final, sending a late goal chance inches wide. A year later the goal would have counted under expanded goal measurements! She scored a goal and two points as Galway won a National League medal in 2002.

After moving to London in 2008, Gilligan played with the London camogie team. She joined Tara Camogie Club of London and helped Tara win Senior Championships in 2009 and 2010. She has captained the team, won a Player of the Match Award in 2010, as well as a number of club awards. As of 2015, she was living in Ealing in London.
