= Imelda Hobbins =

Personal information
- Native name: Irish Nic Oibicín (Irish)
- Born: Galway, Ireland

Sport
- Sport: Camogie
Club*
Years	Club	Apps (scores)
	Mullagh	?
Inter-county**
Years	County	Apps (scores)
	Galway	?
- * club appearances and scores correct as of (16:31, 30 June 2010 (UTC)). **Inter County team apps and scores correct as of (16:31, 30 June 2010 (UTC)).

Imelda Hobbins is a former camogie player, captain of the All Ireland Camogie Championship winning team in 1996, the first for Galway at senior level.

== Early career ==
She won an All Ireland minor medal with Galway in 1986, captained the Cyril Farrell trained St Raphael’s, Loughrea team to the 1988 All-Ireland schools championship, scoring 1-10 in the final against FCJ Bunclody, and scored two goals as Galway beat Limerick 3-4 to 1–5 in the 1988 All Ireland junior final. She won another All-Ireland schools championship in 1989

== Inter-county ==
She was a member of the 1994 National League winning team and the 1998 Galway team beaten by Cork in the All Ireland final.
