= Denise Cronin =

Camogie player

Personal information
- Native name: Denís Ní Chróinín (Irish)
- Born: 1971 (age 54–55) Cork, Ireland

Sport
- Sport: Camogie
- Position: full back
Club*
Years	Club	Apps (scores)
	Glen Rovers	?
Inter-county**
Years	County	Apps (scores)
	Cork	?
- * club appearances and scores correct as of (16:31, 30 June 2010 (UTC)). **Inter County team apps and scores correct as of (16:31, 30 June 2010 (UTC)).

Denise Cronin is a former camogie player, captain of the All Ireland Camogie Championship winning team in 1995.

== Playing career ==
She won six All Ireland senior medals in all and 1998.

== Management ==
In 2009, she managed Cork's All Ireland winning team and won the O’Neill's camogie manager of the year award, having first joined the selectorial team in 2008.
