= Linda Mellerick =

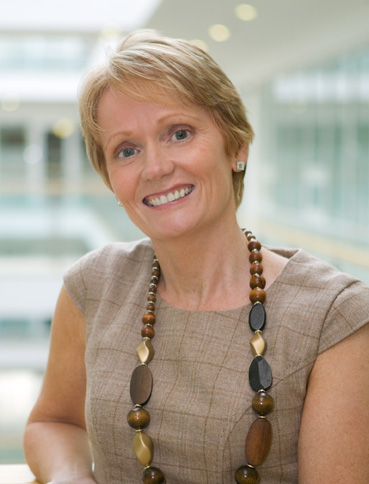

Personal information
- Native name: Linda Ní Mhaoilgheiric (Irish)
- Born: Cork, Ireland

Sport
- Sport: Camogie
- Position: Midfield
Club
- Years: Club
- 1981-2002: Glen Rovers
Inter-county
- Years: County
- 1981-2002: Cork
Inter-county titles
- All-Irelands: 6
- All Stars: 2004 Team of Century

Linda Mellerick is a former camogie player selected on the camogie team of the century in 2004, and winner of All Ireland medals in 1992, 1993, 1995, 1997, 1998 and 2002.

== Background & club career ==
Though born in Tipperary, Linda's family moved to live in Cork when she was three. She started her Camogie career with the Brian Dillons club before moving to Glen Rovers, where she won ten Cork County Championships and three All Ireland Club Championships.

== Inter-county ==
In an inter-county career with Cork which spanned 21 years she won one Minor, one junior and six senior All Ireland titles, ten National Camogie League titles and four Gael Linn Cup inter-provincial titles. She captained Cork to All Ireland success in 1993 and 1997.

== Awards ==
Apart from her selection on the camogie team of the century in 2004, she won the B&I "Player of the Year Award" in 1993 and 1998. She originally planned to retire in 1997 but returned for five more years and eventually retired from the game in 2002 after winning her sixth All Ireland medal and two years before the introduction of the Camogie All Stars Awards scheme.

== Citation ==
Her team of the century citation read: "a player of great energy and skill, she covered the playing pitch in search of the action, always making herself available to help colleagues in defence or attack. Her trademark solo runs are legendary. She split many a defense as she set up or took scores. Her wonderful spirit and leadership qualities made her a most popular player."

== Professional life ==
Linda is managing director at Ireland-based GxP Systems, a leading provider of regulatory compliance consultancy and project management services. She has overall responsibility for managing GxP Systems, from overseeing day-to-day operations to defining the company's strategic direction.

Linda covers senior club and inter-county championship camogie games and writes a regular column for the Cork Evening Echo. She has done radio work for Ireland's national broadcasting station, RTÉ. Previously, Linda held senior level financial and operational positions, where she significantly and consistently improved company performance. She is a qualified CPA.
