= Galway GAA =

County board of the Gaelic Athletic Association in Ireland

- Irish: Gaillimh
- Nickname(s): The Tribesmen
- Province: Connacht
- Dominant sport: Dual county
- Ground(s): Pearse Stadium, Galway
- County colours: Maroon White

County teams
- NFL: Division 1
- NHL: Division 1A
- Football Championship: Sam Maguire Cup
- Hurling Championship: Liam MacCarthy Cup
- Ladies' Gaelic football: Brendan Martin Cup
- Camogie: O'Duffy Cup

The Galway County Boards of the Gaelic Athletic Association (GAA) (Irish: Cumann Lúthchleas Gael Coiste Chontae na Gaillimhe) or Galway GAA are one of the 32 county boards in Ireland; they are responsible for Gaelic games in County Galway, and for the Galway county teams.

Galway is one of the few dual counties in Ireland, competing in a similar level in both hurling and football codes. Prior to amalgamation of the hurling and football county boards into one county board, each of the two codes were previously run by their separate boards in Galway, which was unusual for a dual county.

The county football team was the first from the province of Connacht to win an All-Ireland Senior Football Championship (SFC), but the second to appear in the final, following Mayo. It contests the All-Ireland Senior Football Championship via the Connacht Senior Football Championship. It is currently in Division 1 of the National Football League.

The county hurling team contests the All-Ireland Senior Hurling Championship via the Leinster Senior Hurling Championship. It is currently in Division 1 of the National Hurling League.

== Governance ==
Galway GAA has jurisdiction over the area of the traditional county of Galway. Galway GAA forms a part of the provincial branch, Connacht GAA. Unlike other counties in Ireland, Gaelic games in Galway was run by two separate county boards. Gaelic football was organised by the Galway football board and hurling was organised by the Galway hurling board. This separation resulted in two different county crests, two different county jerseys and two different team sponsors. In theory, the boards were overseen by a County Board, but were autonomous in terms of finance and the election of officers. In 2013, the boards were replaced by football and hurling committees with the officers of the committees no longer elected but appointed by the County Board (now the County Committee). Financial control was also centralised and the crests, sponsorship and jerseys of the two teams were amalgamated. The new committees in Galway undertook, for their respective codes, the organisation of the annual county club championships in football and hurling for the clubs of Galway. In hurling, the Hurling Committee, also organises the Minor, U-21 and Junior competitions while in football, these grades are organised primarily by regional committees, the West GPC and the North GPC. Intercounty adult teams fall under the jurisdiction of the County Committee. Underage club competitions (U-16 and younger) are organised in each code by separate committees, Coiste Peil na nÓg and Coiste Iomána na nÓg. Underage development squads and activities at ages under 11 are under the auspices of the Coaching and Games Committee.

Noel Treacy served as the chairman of Galway County Board for five years and, afterwards, served on the Connacht Council.

== Football ==
=== Clubs ===
Clubs contest the Galway Senior Football Championship (SFC).

As of 2025, the Galway SFC title holder is Moycullen.

Corofin have 5 All-Ireland Senior Club Football Championships.

=== County team ===
Despite having represented the province a number of times by default, it wasn't until 1911, that Galway earned the right to call themselves full Connacht champions, when the Tribesmen defeated Roscommon by a single point on a score of 1-03 to 1-02. They were beaten by Cork in the semi-finals, losing by 3-4 to 0-2. Galway were also Connacht champions in 1913 and 1917, without winning their semi-finals, but the 1919 championship saw them reach their first ever All-Ireland final. After beating Cavan 4-2 to 2-2 in the replay of their semi-final, the Tribesmen lost the final by 2-5 to 0-1, against Kildare.

Galway won their first ever title in the 1925 championship. The championship has become known for the farcical manner in which the play-offs took place. The Connacht final was not held in time to produce a team to play the other three provinces in the semi-finals. Mayo, the previous season's Connacht champions were nominated to represent the province. Mayo beat Wexford in their semi-final, while Kerry beat Cavan in the other semi-final. However, both Kerry and Cavan were disqualified for fielding illegal players. Mayo were declared champions without the need for a final. However, in the meantime, Galway defeated Mayo in the Connacht final, which caused confusion. The nomination of Mayo to represent Connacht was withdrawn, and Galway were declared rightful Connacht champions and All-Ireland champions.

This was deemed unsatisfactory, however, and the GAA ordered the semi-finals to be replayed, with Galway taking the place of Connacht champions. However, Kerry complained that their semi-final victory over Cavan should stand. When the GAA insisted that it should not stand due to the disqualifications Kerry withdrew, leaving Cavan to automatically proceed to the final. Galway defeated Cavan in the final. The farce went on so long that the final was not played until 10 January 1926. In the end Cavan, despite having previously been disqualified, finished with a silver medal, Mayo, despite having previously been declared champions, were eliminated, and Galway, despite having previously been removed from the tournament, were champions. Officially there wasn't any championship in 1925.

Their next title came under more straightforward circumstances, in 1934. They beat Dublin 3-5 to 1-9 in the final to take the Sam Maguire Cup to Connacht for the first time since it was originally presented to the winning team in 1928. Four years later in the 1938 championship, Galway claimed their third football All-Ireland. The final with Kerry had to replayed after it finished level at 3-3 to 2-6, but the Tribesmen won the replay 2-4 to 0-7. Title number four came nearly twenty years later when Galway beat Cork 2-13 to 3-7 in the 1956 final in Croke Park.

1966 was perhaps Galway's most successful year in football. Their Connacht campaign began in Castlebar against Roscommon, Galway winning, by a score of 1–11 to 0–5. In the final, the Tribesmen came up against Mayo in Castlebar and were fortunate to win, edging Mayo out by a single point with a final score of 0–12 to 1–8. The semi-final win over Cork was a close affair as Johnny Geraghty made two wondrous saves from Niall Fitzgerald in the second half. Galway eked out a win 1–11 to 1–9 with Jimmy Duggan again outstanding and Coleen McDonagh fitting in well and Cyril Dunne (1–7) best in attack. Meath defeated Down in the other semi-final and were firm favourites to beat Galway in the final. Galway travelled as a united front to the final and pulverized Meath to win comfortably by 1–10 to 0–7. That victory sealed a memorable "3 In A Row" of All-Ireland titles.

Galway won five Connacht titles in the 1980s, but qualified for only one All-Ireland final. The team did come close to making the final at the expense of eventual All Ireland champions Offaly in 1982, leading for most of the 1982 All Ireland semi-final, before succumbing to a point from Brendan Lowry. The one final the team did qualify for in the decade was in 1983, where they came up against Dublin, in a match now infamous for foul play and thuggery. After an undisciplined beginning to the game, Barney Rock scored a bizarre goal from 40 yards after a poor free-out from Galway goalkeeper Padraig Coyne. The Galway players protested, claiming the goal should not have stood, due to Dublin manager Kevin Heffernan interfering with play as he attended to the injured Joe McNally, but the goal stood. Not long after, following a tussle in midfield, Dublin's Brian Mullins swung back his arm and connected with Brian Talty and the referee decided to send Mullins off. Shortly before half-time a number of players clashed beneath the Hogan Stand, leading referee John Gough to send off a player from each side, Dublin's Ray Hazley and Galway's Tomás Tierney. The match remained heated until half-time. Players from both sides clashed in the tunnel as they left the field for the break, and although rumours circulated for years about the incident, whatever happened in the tunnel, stayed in the tunnel. Whatever peace had the time apart may have brought completely disappeared five minutes after the restart, with the dismissal of Kieran Duff of Dublin after he kicked Galway’s Pat O’Neill while he was on the ground. This left Dublin with 12 men on the field to Galway's 14. Galway, however, could not make their two-man advantage count and ultimately lost 1-10 to 1-8. In the aftermath of the match, Galway players Tomás Tierney and Peter Lee were given one month bans, while four individuals from the Dublin team received bans including a 12-month ban to Duff, for the kick to O'Neill's head, and a 3-month ban to manager Heffernan.

In the 1998 championship, led by Mayo-born manager John O'Mahony, Galway won their first round encounter with Mayo, before overcoming Leitrim by 1-16 to 0-05 in the semi-final. The first final ended as a draw, 11 points apiece with Roscommon, but Galway won the replay in Hyde Park. In the semis, Galway came up against Ulster champions Derry, and won by 0-16 to 1-09. In the final the team faced a Kildare team that had just beaten the previous year's champions, Kerry, and were coached by 8 time All-Ireland winning manager Mick O'Dwyer. Galway went into the final as underdogs, but outstanding performances from Ja Fallon and Michael Donnellan in that match, along with a superbly taken goal from a young Pádraic Joyce, helped Galway overcome the Lilywhites by 1-14 to 1-10. Captain Ray Silke lifted the Sam Maguire, and Galway became the first Connacht team in 32 years to win an All-Ireland title.

Galway made a strong start to the new millennium. After beating Leitrim in the Connacht final, Galway faced Kildare in the semi-final, winning by 0-15 to 2-6 to progress to the final, with Pádraic Joyce scoring 7 of Galway's points. Galway's opponents in the final were a Kerry team managed by eight time All-Ireland winning player, Páidí Ó Sé. Galway came from behind to draw level with Kerry at 0-14 each, putting the game through to a replay. In the replay, however, Galway were beaten by four points, with a final score of 0-17 to 1-10.

Galway came back the following year, however. Due to rule changes in the 2001 season, a qualifier round was introduced to allow teams eliminated from their provincial championship to make it through to the latter stages of the competition. Galway were forced to make use of this new 'back door' after they were knocked out of the Connacht championship in the semi-finals by Roscommon. Galway were put into Round 3 of the qualifiers, where they came up against Armagh. After a hard fought match Galway came out as winners on a scoreline of just 0-13 to 0-12, Paul Clancy scoring the winning point. After that, Galway faced beaten Munster finalists Cork in Round 4, who they beat by a score of 1-14 to 1-10 to qualify for the All-Ireland quarter-finals.

In the quarters, the team came up against Roscommon, the team that had knocked them into the qualifiers to begin with. Galway made use of their second chance, beating the Rossies by 0-14 to 1-05, to qualify for a semi-final against fellow 'back door' team Derry. Galway came out on top in the semi-final, beating the northerners by three points to qualify for the All-Ireland final, thus becoming the first team to qualify for an All-Ireland final without being champions of their own province. They went into the final as massive underdogs, however, as their opponents Meath had beaten the previous year's champions Kerry 2-14 to 0-05, and had limited Kerry to a single point in the second half. Things did not work out as expected for Meath fans however, and after going in level at the break at 6 points apiece, Galway came out after half-time and blew Meath away, scoring 11 second half points to Meath's 2, giving a final score of 0-17 to 0-08. Pádraic Joyce alone scored 10 points in the final to take his tally to 3-45 in eight games, and finished the season as the Championship's top scorer. This time it was Gary Fahey who lifted the Sam Maguire, giving the Tribesmen their second All-Ireland win in four years, and making Galway the first ever 'back door' champions.

== Hurling ==
=== Clubs ===
Clubs contest the Galway Senior Hurling Championship (SHC).

As of 2024, the Galway SHC title holder is Loughrea.

Galway clubs took three successive All-Ireland titles in 1992–94 and Athenry three in 1997, 2000 and 2001.

=== County team ===
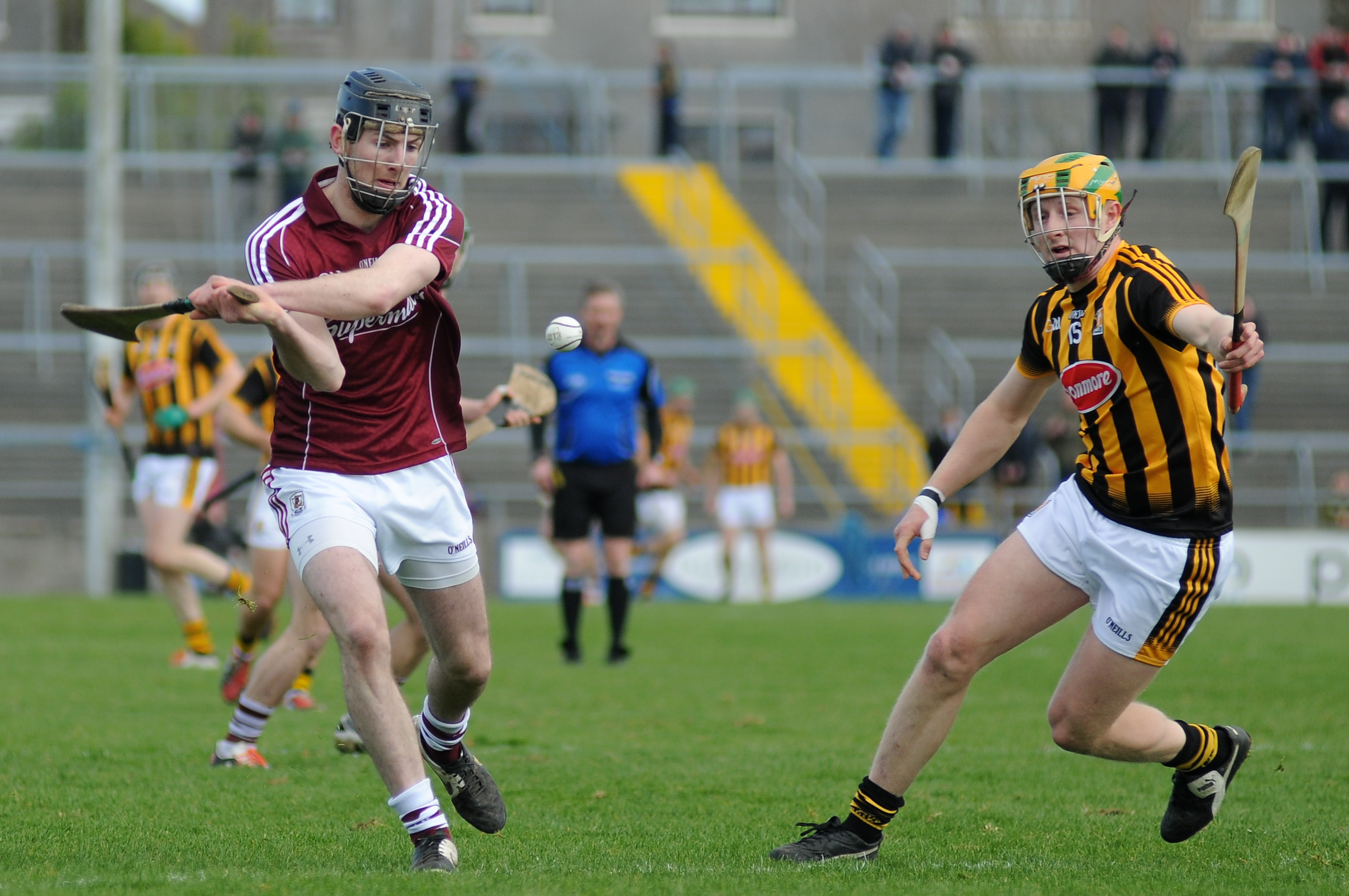
Pádraic Mannion in action for Galway in the team's 2015 National Hurling League victory over All-Ireland SHC title holder Kilkenny

Galway finished as runner-up in the first edition of the All-Ireland Senior Hurling Championship (SHC), losing to Tipperary in the 1887 final. The team did not reach another final in the competition until the 1923 championship. In the 1923 final, Galway defeated Limerick, to become All-Ireland SHC champions for the first time. Galway advanced to the final on four more occasions during that decade (1924, 1925, 1928 and 1929) but lost each game. Galway finished as All-Ireland SHC runner-up on three occasions in the 1950s (1953, 1955 and 1958), and by then it had been 35 years since the team's only title win. Like other counties with a history of success that preceded a lengthy period without title wins (Mayo in football and Clare in hurling), Galway's hurling team became the subject of rumours of a curse. In 1969 Connacht reached the final of the interprovincial Railway Cup for the first time in ten years with a team consisting mainly of Galway players; Connacht held Munster to a draw before losing the replay, and this boosted the game in the county. However, Galway's following All-Ireland SHC campaign ended with a loss to London in the 1969 championship. The following year Connacht lost at home to Ulster in the preliminary round of the 1970 Railway Cup, running up a total of 20 wides. By the time Galway's hurlers were heavily defeated in the 1975 and 1979 All-Ireland SHC finals, "the curse" had become part of folklore.

Galway GAA club Castlegar won the 1979–80 All-Ireland Senior Club Hurling Championship, while Connacht defeated Munster in that year's Railway Cup final. Cyril Farrell was Galway's senior county hurling team manager for the 1980 championship. Due to the lack of competition for Galway in Connacht, the team's first match of the season came against Kildare in the All-Ireland SHC quarter-final, a game which Galway won comfortably by a scoreline of 5–15 to 1–11. From there the team progressed to an All-Ireland SHC semi-final against Leinster Senior Hurling Championship (SHC) winner Offaly. Galway secured a two-point win over Offaly, by a scoreline of 4–9 to 3–10. Thus Galway qualified for the 1980 All-Ireland Senior Hurling Championship Final, where the opponent was Limerick. A close game, in which five goals were scored, finished in Galway's favour by a scoreline of 2–15 to 3–9. Joe Connolly, the team captain, became the first Galway man to lift the Liam MacCarthy Cup since Mick Kenny in 1923. As the defending champion, the Galway team played its first game in the 1981 All-Ireland SHC, a quarter-final against Antrim, on 19 July, winning by a scoreline of 6–23 to 3–11. The team progressed to an All-Ireland SHC semi-final against Limerick, opponent from the previous year's final. That game finished level at 1–08 to 0–11, with Galway the goal-scoring team. Galway emerged from the replay as five-point winners, qualifying for the deciding match of the competition on a final scoreline of 4–16 to 2–17. Galway played Leinster SHC winner Offaly, whom it had defeated in the 1980 All-Ireland SHC semi-final, in the 1981 final. Galway did not retain the title, losing by a scoreline of 2–12 to 0–15 (a three-point defeat). Galway defeated Cork in the 1985 All-Ireland SHC to qualify for the final. Again the opponent was Offaly, again Galway lost the game, by a scoreline of 2–11 to 1–12 on this occasion. Galway finished as runner-up again in the 1986 final, losing to Cork in that game. Still managed by Farrell, Galway defeated Tipperary by a scoreline of 3–20 to 2–17 in the 1987 All-Ireland SHC semi-final to advance to a third consecutive final. Captained by Conor Hayes and inspired by a young Joe Cooney (who scored five points), Galway defeated Kilkenny by a scoreline of 1–12 to 0–09. Cooney, aged 22, was named Hurler of the Year. Galway opened the defence of its title against London on 16 July, winning the 1988 All-Ireland SHC quarter-final by a scoreline of 4–30 to 2–08. Offaly was the opponent in the All-Ireland SHC semi-final, a team that had given Galway repeated difficulty; Galway, though, emerged as the winner on this occasion, by a scoreline of 3–18 to 3–11. Galway defeated Tipperary by a scoreline of 1–15 to 0–14 in the 1988 final, winning a fourth All-Ireland SHC title. This was also the first time Galway had retained the title it had won the previous year.

For the 2009 All-Ireland SHC, Galway began a trial period of three years participation in the Leinster SHC.

Anthony Cunningham, who had recently led the Galway under-21 team to an All-Ireland title, was appointed manager of the senior team in 2011. Mattie Coleman and Tom Helebert were picked to help Cunningham. Galway barely saved its Division 1 status in the 2012 National Hurling League, requiring a replay in a relegation play-off match against Dublin. Galway defeated Westmeath and Offaly in the 2012 Leinster SHC, advancing to the competition's final. In an unexpected result, Galway defeated Kilkenny to win the Bob O'Keefe Cup for the first time. A 2012 Leinster SHC winners' medal was later sold on eBay for €570. Galway met Cork in an All-Ireland SHC semi-final, eventually winning that game after a slow first half. The 2012 All-Ireland SHC Final paired Galway with Kilkenny again. Joe Canning scored a goal for Galway in the tenth minute and his team led by five points at half-time: 1–9 to 0–7. Kilkenny recovered, however, and, late in the game, a Henry Shefflin point taken from the penalty spot separated the sides. Then, with 30 seconds left, Davy Glennon was fouled and Joe Canning scored for Galway from the free, sending the All-Ireland SHC Final to a replay for the first time in 53 years. Kilkenny easily won the replay, by a final scoreline of 3–22 to 3–11. Under Cunninghan's successor Micheál Donoghue, Galway won its fifth All-Ireland SHC title in 2017, its first since 1988.

== Camogie ==
Under Camogie's National Development Plan 2010-2015, "Our Game, Our Passion", five new camogie clubs were to be established in the county by 2015. Five Galway clubs have won the All Ireland Senior Club Championship, Oranmore (1974), Pearses (1996, 1997, 2000, 2001, 2002), Athenry (1977, 2025), Mullagh (1990) and Killimor (2011).

After losing eight All-Ireland SCC finals, including the first final in 1932, Galway won a first All-Ireland SCC title in 1996. It was Imelda Hobbins who was the Galway captain that year. The team won three National Camogie League titles, and they were in 1994, 2002 and 2005.

Imelda Hobbins (1996 All-Ireland SCC-winning captain) was the first All-Ireland SCC winning captain for Galway. No Galway players were included on the team of the century. Other notable players include Aislinn Connolly, who is the daughter of hurler John Connolly, Heather Cooney, who is the brother of hurlers Conor Cooney and Shane Cooney, Niamh Kilkenny, who is married to hurler Cyril Donnellan, teacher Sinéad Cahalan, teacher Lorraine Ryan, Denise Gilligan, who has a severe hearing impairment as a result of the measles, Veronica Curtin, Susan Earner, Therese Maher, Sarah Dervan.

Galway has the following achievements in camogie.

- All-Ireland Senior Camogie Championships: 5
  - (click on year for team line-outs) 1996, 2013, 2019, 2021, 2025
- Runners-Up 1932, 1933, 1934, 1935, 1936, 1937, 1939, 1940, 1946, 1960, 1962, 1993, 1997, 1998, 2008, 2010
- All-Ireland Junior Camogie Championships: 7
  - 1972, 1979, 1985, 1988, 1994, 1998, 2003 Runners-Up 1973, 1989, 1992
- All-Ireland Minor Camogie Championships: 2
  - (Click on year for details & team line-outs) 2010 and 2012
- All-Ireland Intermediate Camogie Championships: 2
  - 2004, 2013
- National Camogie League: 3
  - (click on year for team line-outs) 1994, 2002 and 2005.
- National League (Junior): 3
- All-Ireland Under-16 Championships: 9
  - 1977, 1981, 1986, 1987, 1994, 1996, 1997, 2000, 2004
  - 1985, 1995, 2003

== Ladies' football ==
Galway has the following achievements in ladies' football.

- All-Ireland Senior Ladies' Football Championships: 2
  - 2004, 2026
- All-Ireland Junior Ladies' Football Championships: 2
  - 1985, 2002
- All-Ireland Intermediate Ladies' Football Championships: 1
  - 1992
- All-Ireland Under-18 Ladies' Football Championships: 7
  - 2002, 2005, 2010, 2013, 2014, 2018, 2023
- All-Ireland Under-16 Ladies' Football Championships: 5
  - 2003, 2012, 2017, 2018, 2019
- All-Ireland Under-14 Ladies' Football Championships: 2
  - 2008, 2017
