= Gael Linn Cup 1959 =

1959 Camogie competition

Tournament details
- Date: October 1959 (first round) — 1 November 1959 (final)

Winners
- Champions: Leinster (4th title)

Runners-up
- Runners-up: Ulster

The 1959 Gael Linn Cup was the fourth edition of an annual representative competition for elite level participants in the women's team field sport of camogie, contested by teams representing the four provinces of Ireland. It was won by Leinster, who defeated Ulster in the final played at Casement Park.

== Final stages ==
The competition was distinguished on 25 October by two close semi-finals, Leinster defeating Munster 7–2 to 6–3 at Dungarvan as Una O'Connor scored six goals for Lienster and Kay Downes scored five for Munster; and Ulster defeating Connacht 3–4 to 3–3. In the final on 1 November, five goals from Una O'Connor helped Leinster to a 6–0 to 1–3 victory over Ulster, meaning Leinster had won the cup all four times that it had been contested, while Ulster had finished as runners-up three times. Agnes Hourigan wrote in The Irish Press:

The scoreline suggests a more one sided game than ensued. Full credit must go to the Leinster defence and goalkeeper for their display.

1 November
Final

Leinster	6-0 — 1-3	Ulster

Casement Park

Leinster	Ulster

Leinster:
GK	1	Lily Tobin (Killkenny)
FB	2	Betty Hughes (Dublin)
RWB	3	Susan Lennon (Louth)
CB	4	Doreen Brennan (Dublin)
LWB	5	Rose Woods (Louth)
MF	6	Chris Whitty (Laois)
MF	7	Annette Corrigan (Dublin) (captain)
MF	8	Betty Green (Wexford)
RWF	9	Mary O'Sullivan (Dublin) (1–0)
CF	10	Kay Ryder (Dublin)
LWF	11	Annie Donnelly (Dublin)
FF	12	Una O'Connor (Dublin) (5–0)

Ulster:
GK	1	Eileen Gormley (Antrim)
FB	2	Alice Mackle (Armagh)
RWB	3	Carrie Rankin (Derry)
CB	4	Chris Hughes (Antrim) (0–1)
LWB	5	Sue Ward (Antrim)
MF	6	Margo McCourt (Antrim)
MF	7	Margaret Dorrity (Derry)
MF	8	Brigid Downey (Derry)
RWF	9	Marion Kearns (Antrim)
CF	10	Bernadette McCluskey (Derry)
LWF	11	Maeve Gilroy (Antrim) (1–2)
FF	12	Lily Reynolds (Armagh)

Preceded by Gael Linn Cup 1958	Gael Linn Cup; 1956 – 2016	Succeeded by Gael Linn Cup 1960
