= Gael Linn Cup 1997 =

Winners
- Champions: Munster (12th title)

Runners-up
- Runners-up: Leinster

Other
- Matches played: 3

The 1997 Gael Linn Cup, the most important representative competition for elite level participants in the women's team field sport of camogie, was won by Munster, who defeated Leinster in the final, played at Russell Park.

== Arrangements ==
Leinster defeated Ulster 3–14 to 3–13 in the semi-final at Russell Park. Lynn Dunlea scored 2–5 as Munster defeated Connacht 3–14 to 2–10.

== Final ==
Leinster led by four points ten minutes from the end of the final against Munster at Russell Park. But Munster's come back brought the match to extra-time for the second successive year and their superior fitness enabled them to add 3–7 during the 20 minutes of extended play.

=== Gael Linn Trophy ===
Munster defeated Connacht 3–14 to 4–6 and Kildare's Miriam Malone scored the only goal of the game as Leinster defeated Ulster 1–8. Tipperary's Deirdre Hughes scored 3–1 as Munster defeated Leinster 3–11 to 2–10 in the final.

=== Final stages ===
Final

Munster	5–15 – 1–14 After extra time	Leinster

Russell Park

Munster	Leinster

|}

Munster:
GK	1	Cora Keohane (Cork)
FB	2	Eithne Duggan (Cork)
RWB	3	Marie Collins (Clare)
CB	4	Jovita Delaney (Tipperary)
LWB	5	Mary O'Connor (Cork)
MF	6	Fiona O'Driscoll (Cork)
MF	7	Moira McMahon (Clare)
MF	8	Sinéad O'Callaghan (Cork)
RWF	9	Lynn Dunlea (Cork)
CF	10	Pauline McCarthy (Limerick)
LWF	11	Linda Mellerick (Cork)
FF	12	Deirdre Hughes (Tipperary)

Leinster:
GK	1	Michelle Fennelly (Kilkenny)
FB	2	Avis Nolan (Wexford)
RWB	3	Esther Kennedy (Kilkenny)
CB	4	Sinéad Costello (Kilkenny)
LWB	5	Kelly Long (Kilkenny)
MF	6	Michelle O'Leary (Wexford)
MF	7	Marina Downey (Kilkenny)
MF	8	Margaret Hickey (Kilkenny)
RWF	9	Kate Kelly (Wexford)
CF	10	Catherine Dunne (Kilkenny)
LWF	11	Geraldine Codd (Wexford)
FF	12	Esme Murphy (Wexford)

== Junior Final ==
Final

Munster	3–11 – 2–10	Leinster

Russell Park

Munster	Leinster

|}

Munster:
GK	1	Leona Nolan (Cork)
FB	2	Emily Hayden (Tipperary)
RWB	3	Alison Dilworth (Cork)
CB	4	Hilda Kenneally (Cork)
LWB	5	Sinéad O'Callaghan(Cork)
MF	6	Helena Frawley (Tipperary)
MF	7	Linda O'Sullivan (Cork)
MF	8	Mary Kennefick (Cork)
RWF	9	Enda Dineen (Cork)
CF	10	Jovita Delaney (Tipperary)
LWF	11	Deirdre Hughes (Tipperary)
FF	12	Sinéad Collins (Tipperary)

Leinster:
GK	1	Mary Henry (Westmeath)
FB	2	Aoife Davitt (Westmeath)
RWB	3	Melanie Treacy (Kildare)
CB	4	Derville O'Carroll (Dublin)
LWB	5	Claire O'Connor (Wexford)
MF	6	Michelle Davis (Offaly)
MF	7	Ailish Atkinson (Wexford)
MF	8	Christine O'Brien (Meath)
RWF	9	Noala Quirke (Carlow)
CF	10	Annette Heffernan (Westmeath)
LWF	11	Miriam Malone (Kildare)
FF	12	Valerie Crean (Carlow)

Preceded by Gael Linn Cup 1996	Gael Linn Cup; 1954 – present	Succeeded by Gael Linn Cup 1998
