= Gael Linn Cup 1960 =

Camogie competition

Tournament details
- Date: 18 September 1960 (final)

Winners
- Champions: Leinster (5th title)

Runners-up
- Runners-up: Munster

The 1960 Gael Linn Cup was the fifth edition of an annual representative competition for elite level participants in the women's team field sport of camogie, contested by teams representing the four provinces of Ireland. It was won by Leinster, who defeated Munster in the final, played at The Park in Cahir, County Tipperary, one of the counties in the province of Munster.

== Final stages ==
The competition took place earlier in the year than the four times it had been previously contested, with the semi-finals being played in late August instead of October or November; and the final being held in mid-September instead of early or mid-November. In the semi-finals on 28 August, Una O'Connor scored 5–1 as Leinster defeated Ulster by 10–5 to 3–3 at Dublin's Parnell Park, while Munster defeated Connacht 6–6 to 4–0 at The Park in Cahir. The final on 18 September, also at Cahir, was closer than previous years, with Leinster hanging on to win the game by 4–1 to 3–2.

Leinster had now won the cup all five times that it had been contested, while Ulster had finished as runners-up four times. Agnes Hourigan, president of the Camogie Association, wrote in The Irish Press:

Leinster snatched victory from a grand Munster side after a thrilling game. Lilly Tobin (Kilkenny) played brilliantly in goal for the winners, and got great assistance in defence from Gerry Hughes (Dublin), and Susan Lennon (Louth). Ciss Whitty (Louth) was best of the midfield trio while the forwards all played their part in victory. Terry Moloney (Tipperary) was the outstanding player on a Munster side for whom Bridie Scully (Tipperary), Geraldine Power (Waterford) and Joan Clancy (Cork) all did well. The winners, playing with the breeze in the first half, made the most of their chances though they had rather less of the play than their opponents who missed many opportunities, including four 30s. Trailing by 3–0 to 1–0 at the interval the determined Munster girls gave their best on the change-over and leveled the scoring after ten minutes, Claire Hanrahan Sculy (Tipperary) then exchanged points. Munster win seemed likely when, in strong pressure, Terry Moloney (Tipperary) gave the home side the lead with a point, but Leinster came back for a wonderful goal, finished by Annie Donnelly] and retained their advantage to the end.

=== Final ===
18 September
Final

| Leinster | 4-6 — 3-1 | Munster |

The Park, Cahir

| Leinster | Munster |

Leinster:
| GK | 1 | Lilly Tobin (Killkenny) |
| FB | 2 | Betty Hughes (Dublin) |
| RWB | 3 | Teresa Nolan (Carlow) |
| CB | 4 | Doreen Brennan (captain) (Dublin) |
| LWB | 5 | Susan Lennon (Louth) |
| MF | 6 | Ciss Whitty (Laois) |
| MF | 7 | Ally Hussey (Dublin) |
| MF | 8 | Mary Kehoe (Wexford) |
| RWF | 9 | Geraldine Callanan (Laois) |
| CF | 10 | Claire Hanrahan (Killkenny) 1–1 |
| LWF | 11 | Annie Donnelly (Dublin) 2–0 |
| FF | 12 | Una O'Connor (Dublin) 1–0 |

Munster:
| GK | 1 | Catherine Carroll (Tipperary) |
| FB | 2 | Peg Moloney (Tipperary) |
| RWB | 3 | Teresa Murphy (Cork) |
| CB | 4 | Bridie Scully (Tipperary) 1–1 |
| LWB | 5 | Joan Clancy (Cork) |
| MF | 6 | Terry Griffin (Tipperary) |
| MF | 7 | Pat Doyle (Waterford) |
| MF | 8 | Lil Coughlan (Cork) |
| RWF | 9 | Carrie Gillane (Limerick) |
| CF | 10 | Geraldine Power (Waterford) |
| LWF | 11 | Tess Moloney (Tipperary) 2–1 |
| FF | 12 | Kathleen Griffin (Tipperary) |

| Preceded by Gael Linn Cup 1959 | Gael Linn Cup; 1956 – 2016 | Succeeded by Gael Linn Cup 1961 |
