= Gael Linn Cup 1965 =

Winners
- Champions: Leinster (7th title)

Runners-up
- Runners-up: Ulster

Other
- Matches played: 3

The 1965 Gael Linn Cup, the most important representative competition for elite level participants in the women's team field sport of camogie, was won by Leinster, who defeated Ulster in the final, played at Casement Park in Belfast.

== Arrangements ==
Connacht offered little by way of resistance to a superior Ulster outfit at Castlebar and paid the heavy price of a 7–13 to 1–0 defeat. In the second semi-final, Leinster defeated Munster by 4–9 to 2–1 at Fermoy. Leinster led Ulster by 3–3 to 1–0 at half time in the final at Casement Park, but Ulster's two late goals left the final score at Leinster 4–3, Ulster 4–1.

Agnes Hourigan, president of the Camogie Association, wrote in the Irish Press:

Antrim's Sue Ward, who was switched to attack from defence, gave new life to the Ulster side when she scored two goals and a point and had a third shot deflected to the net by a Leinster defender. The Ulster rally came too late as their last two goals came in the closing minutes and over the hour Leinster were deserving winners.

=== Final stages ===
30 October
Final

Leinster	4–3 – 4–1	Ulster

Casmeent Park Belfast

Leinster	Ulster

|}

Leinster:
GK	1	Eithne Leech (Dublin)
FB	2	Mary Sinnott (Wexford)
RWB	3	Susan Dooley (Offaly)
CB	4	Ally Hussey (Dublin)
LWB	5	Margaret O'Leary (Wexford)
MF	6	Mary Sherlock (Dublin)
MF	7	Kay Ryder (Dublin) (captain)
MF	8	Orla Ní Síocháin (Dublin) (0–1)
RWF	9	Kit Kehoe (Dublin) (1–0)
CF	10	Claire Hanrahan (Killkenny) (0–2)
LWF	11	Judy Doyle (Dublin) (1–0)
FF	12	Una O'Connor (Dublin) (2–0)

Ulster:
GK	1	Kathleen Kelly (Antrim)
FB	2	Moya Ford (Antrim)
RWB	3	Angela Kennedy (Down)
CB	4	Maeve Gilroy (Antrim)
LWB	5	Sue Ward (Antrim) (3–1)
MF	6	Marion McFetridge (Antrim)
MF	7	Mary McKenna (Monaghan)
MF	8	Mairéad McAtamney (Antrim)
RWF	9	Madeline Sands (Down) (1–0)
CF	10	Betty Smith (Antrim)
LWF	11	Lily Clarke (Monaghan)
FF	12	Mary Phil Jameson (Antrim)

Preceded by Gael Linn Cup 1964	Gael Linn Cup; 1954 – present	Succeeded by Gael Linn Cup 1966
