= Gael Linn Cup 1977 =

Winners
- Champions: Munster (2nd junior title)

Runners-up
- Runners-up: Connacht

Other
- Matches played: 3

The 1977 Gael Linn Cup, the most important representative competition for elite level participants in the women's team field sport of camogie, was played at junior level only in the three years 1975-7. It was won by Munster, who defeated Connacht in the final, played at Adare.

== Arrangements ==
Connacht defeated Leinster by 2–3 to 1–5 at Russell Park, Blanchardstown. Munster defeated Ulster 6–4 to 1–3 at Carrickmacross. Using nine Limerick players who had won the All-Ireland junior championship, Munster led by five points at halftime in the final and defeated Connacht 3–7 to 3–1.

=== Final stages ===
Final

Munster	3–7 – 3–1	Connacht

Adare

Munster	Connacht

|}

Munster:
GK	1	Helen Butler (Limerick)
FB	2	Margie Neville (Limerick)
RWB	3	Betty Joyce (Cork)
CB	4	Geraldine O'Brien (Limerick)
LWB	5	Marie Coughlan (Cork)
MF	6	Bernie O'Brien (Limerick)
MF	7	Marian Doyle (Limerick)
MF	8	Vera Mackey (Limerick)
RWF	9	Brigid Darcy (Limerick)
CF	10	Carrie Clancy (Limerick) (captain)
LWF	11	Eileen Kavanagh(Cork)
FF	12	Bríd Stokes(Limerick)

Connacht:
GK	1	Breda Coady (Galway)
FB	2	Catherine Gannon (Rocommon)
RWB	3	Breda Glynn (Galway) (captain)
CB	4	Bridie Cunniffe (Galway)
LWB	5	Bernie Barrett (Galway)
MF	6	Una Jordan (Galway)
MF	7	Anne Burke (Galway)
MF	8	Anne Morris (Galway)
RWF	9	Mary Kelly (Galway)
CF	10	Marion Freaney (Galway)
LWF	11	Magde Hobbins (Galway)
FF	12	Bernie Coonron (Rocommon)

Preceded by Gael Linn Cup 1976	Gael Linn Cup; 1954 – present	Succeeded by Gael Linn Cup 1978
