= Gael Linn Cup 1975 =

Winners
- Champions: Munster (1st junior title)

Runners-up
- Runners-up: Ulster

Other
- Matches played: 3

The 1975 Gael Linn Cup, the most important representative competition for elite level participants in the women's team field sport of camogie, was played at junior level only in the three years 1975-7. It was won by Munster, who defeated Ulster in the final.

== Arrangements ==
Munster raced into a five-goal lead against Leinster, before Leinster hauled back 1–1 in the semi-final of the revamped Gael-Linn Cup at Gowran, County Kilkenny. Ulster defeated Connacht 3–1 to 1–5 in the second semi-final at Carrickmacross. Munster used nine Limerick players in their 5–1 to 2–0 victory over Ulster, one of the exceptions, Frances Barry-Murphy was a sister of Jimmy Barry Murphy

=== Final stages ===
Final

| Munster | 5–1 – 2–0 | Ulster |

| Munster | Ulster |

|}

Munster:
| GK | 1 | Helen Butler (Limerick) |
| FB | 2 | Ann Meaney (Limerick) |
| RWB | 3 | Margie Neville (Limerick) |
| CB | 4 | Geraldine O'Brien (Limerick) (captain) |
| LWB | 5 | Mary Walsh (Cork) |
| MF | 6 | Dolores O'Brien (Limerick) |
| MF | 7 | Marion Doyle (Limerick) |
| MF | 8 | Susan Burke (Cork) |
| RWF | 9 | Brigid Darcy (Limerick) |
| CF | 10 | Carrie Clancy (Limerick) |
| LWF | 11 | Bríd Stokes (Limerick) |
| FF | 12 | Frances Barry-Murphy (Cork) |

Ulster:
| GK | 1 | Eleanor Hughes (Monaghan) |
| FB | 2 | Anne McCone (Armagh) |
| RWB | 3 | Eileen McAvinney (Monaghan) |
| CB | 4 | Patsy Toal (Armagh) |
| LWB | 5 | Ann McCaffrey (Fermanagh) |
| MF | 6 | Susan Lively (Down) |
| MF | 7 | Mary Ogle (Tyrone) |
| MF | 8 | Margaret Moriarty (Armagh) |
| RWF | 9 | Breda Sherry (Monaghan) |
| CF | 10 | Marian McGarvey (Down) |
| LWF | 11 | Josephine Hands (Tyrone) |
| FF | 12 | Pauline Vallelly (Armagh) |

| Preceded by Gael Linn Cup 1974 | Gael Linn Cup; 1954 – present | Succeeded by Gael Linn Cup 1976 |
