= Gael Linn Cup 1964 =

1964 Camogie competition

Winners
- Champions: Munster (4th title)

Runners-up
- Runners-up: Leinster

Other
- Matches played: 3

The 1964 Gael Linn Cup was a representative competition for elite level participants in the women's team field sport of camogie, contested by teams representing the four provinces of Ireland. It was won by Munster, who defeated Leinster in the final, played at Cahir.

== Arrangements ==
Connacht were unable to travel to meet Leinster for one semi-final and withdrew from the competition. In the other semi-final, five of the six counties in the province of Munster (except County Kerry) were represented on the Munster team that defeated Ulster by 7–3 to 2–4 at Roscrea. After the semi-final, sisters Terry and Kathleen Griffin withdrew from the Munster team due to the death of their father.

The final was played at Cahir and was level four times before a Late Ann Carroll point enabled Munster to defeat Leinster 2-6 to 3-2 to retain the trophy. Agnes Hourigan, president of the Camogie Association, wrote in The Irish Press:

Munster had more of the play territorially but faulty shooting cost them many scores. After a switch in the Leinster team between Judy Doyle and Mary Walsh brought a great rally and a goal and a point which put Leinster in front, Munster put in a great finish when they drew level and then went ahead with a point to snatch victory.

=== Final stages ===
25 October
Final

| Munster | 2-8 — 3-2 | Leinster |

Cahir

| Munster | Leinster |

Munster:
| GK | 1 | Deirdre Sutton (Cork) |
| FB | 2 | Peg Moloney (Tipperary) |
| RWB | 3 | Bridie Giltenane (Limerick) |
| CB | 4 | Bridget Ryan (Limerick) |
| LWB | 5 | Anne Graham (Tipperary) |
| MF | 6 | Deirdre Young (Cork) |
| MF | 7 | Lilian Howlett (Waterford) (0–2) |
| MF | 8 | Teresa Murphy (Cork) |
| RWF | 9 | Ann Carroll (Tipperary) (0–2) |
| CF | 10 | Bernie Moloney (Tipperary) (1–0) |
| LWF | 11 | Kitty Murphy (Clare) (0–2) |
| FF | 12 | Rena Manley (Cork) (1–0) |

Leinster:
| GK | 1 | Concepta Clarke (Dublin) |
| FB | 2 | Mary Sinnott (Wexford) |
| RWB | 3 | Joan Murphy (Wexford) |
| CB | 4 | Ally Hussey (Dublin) |
| LWB | 5 | Kay Lyons (Dublin) |
| MF | 6 | Mary Walsh (Wexford) |
| MF | 7 | Pat Higgins (Kildare) |
| MF | 8 | Kay Ryder (Dublin) |
| RWF | 9 | Kitty Murphy (Louth) (1–0) |
| CF | 10 | Una O'Connor (Dublin) (2–0) |
| LWF | 11 | Judy Doyle (Dublin) (0–1) |
| FF | 12 | Claire Hanrahan (Killkenny) (0–1) |

| Preceded by Gael Linn Cup 1963 | Gael Linn Cup; 1954 – present | Succeeded by Gael Linn Cup 1965 |
