= Gael Linn Cup 1974 =

Carnogie tournament

Winners
- Champions: Connacht (2nd title)

Runners-up
- Runners-up: Munster

Other
- Matches played: 3

The 1974 Gael Linn Cup, the most important representative competition for elite level participants in the women's team field sport of camogie, was won by Connacht, who defeated Munster in the final, played at Ballinsasloe.

== Arrangements ==
Munster defeated Ulster 10–4 to 1–3 in Shannon. Fielding an all-Galway selection, holders Connacht defeated Leinster 6–3 to 1–2 in Ballinsasloe and then retained the Gael-Linn Cup in a hugely entertaining final also at Duggan Park, Ballinasloe. Munster had a goal disallowed in the closing stages for square ball as they fought back from six points down. Margaret Murphy scored two of Connacht's goals, while Nono McHugh contributed 1–5.

The Connacht Tribune noted:

This Galway team showed an understanding and a maturity that stood them in good stead. From goalkeeper out they hurled with great confidence and whenever Munster fought back they were able to raise their game and take control again. Stickwork and ball control were admirable but, above all, and glory to them for it, they had spiritand the will to win.

Agnes Hourigan, president of the Camogie Association, wrote in the Irish Press:

Nono McHugh, the Connacht right wing, was the star of the game. She played a vital part in her own position, was always at hand to help in defence and attack and scored a personal tally of 1–5. The all Galway side were fitter, played more constructive camogie and with less chances were two points in front at half time though facing a stiff breeze.

=== Final stages ===
3 November
Final

Connacht	3–7 – 3–0	Munster

Ballinsasloe

Connacht	Munster

Connacht:
GK	1	Margaret Killeen (Galway)
FB	2	Mary Kilkenny (Galway)
RWB	3	Claire Collins (Galway)
CB	4	Rita Jordan (Galway)
LWB	5	Marian Ford(Galway)
MF	6	Nono McHugh (Galway) (1–5)
MF	7	Ann O'Donoghue (Galway)
MF	8	Catherine Ward (Galway) (0–1)
RWF	9	Midge Poniard (Galway) (0–1)
CF	10	Josie Kelly (Galway)
LWF	11	Jane Murphy (Galway)
FF	12	Margaret Murphy (Galway) 2–0

Munster:
GK	1	Deirdre Sutton (Cork)
FB	2	Marie Costine (Cork)
RWB	3	Sheila Dunne (Cork)
CB	4	Margaret O'Toole (Clare)
LWB	5	Claire Harrington (Clare)
MF	6	Deirdre Lane (Tipperary)
MF	7	Pat Moloney (Cork)
MF	8	Bríd Stokes (Limerick)
RWF	9	Marian Sweeney (Cork) (1–0)
CF	10	Anne Ryan (Cork)
LWF	11	Marian McCarthy (Cork) (1–0)
FF	12	Nancy O'Driscoll (Cork) 1–0

Preceded by Gael Linn Cup 1973	Gael Linn Cup; 1954 – present	Succeeded by Gael Linn Cup 1976
