= Gael Linn Cup 1958 =

1958 Camogie competition

Tournament details
- Date: 16 November 1958 (final)

Winners
- Champions: Leinster (3rd title)

Runners-up
- Runners-up: Ulster

Other
- Matches played: 3

The 1958 Gael Linn Cup was the third edition of an annual representative competition for elite level participants in the women's team field sport of camogie, contested by teams representing the four provinces of Ireland. It was won by Leinster, who defeated Ulster in the final on 16 November, played at Parnell Park.

== The Final ==
In the semi-finals, Ulster defeated Munster, 4–1 to 2–6 and Leinster defeated Connacht, 6–7 to 0–2 on 26 October. On 16 November Leinster defeated Ulster in the final at Parnell Park by 8–2 to 3–3. Agnes Hourigan wrote in The Irish Press:

Leinster who fielded no less than ten Dublin players were in command from start to finish.

=== Final stages ===
Final

| Leinster | 8-2 — 3-3 | Ulster |

Parnell Park

| Leinster | Ulster |

Leinster:
| GK | 1 | May Kavanagh (Dublin) |
| FB | 2 | Betty Hughes (Dublin) |
| RWB | 3 | Vera Lee (Kildare) |
| CB | 4 | Kay Ryder (Dublin) |
| LWB | 5 | Rose Woods (Louth) |
| MF | 6 | Bríd Reid (Dublin) |
| MF | 7 | Annette Corrigan (captain) (Dublin) |
| MF | 8 | Kathleen Mills (Dublin) |
| RWF | 9 | Anna May Brennan (Laois) (1–0) |
| CF | 10 | Mary O'Sullivan (Dublin) (1–0) |
| LWF | 11 | Una O'Connor (Dublin) (6–1) |
| FF | 12 | Annie Donnelly (Dublin) |

Ulster:
| GK | 1 | Teresa Kearns (Antrim) |
| FB | 2 | Moya Forde (Antrim) |
| RWB | 3 | Eithne Carabine (Antrim) |
| CB | 4 | Winnie Kearns (Antrim) (0–1) |
| LWB | 5 | Irene Maguire (Antrim) |
| MF | 6 | Margo McCourt (Antrim) |
| MF | 7 | Margaret Dorrity (Derry) (1–1) |
| MF | 8 | Madge Rainey (Antrim) |
| RWF | 9 | Chris Hughes (Antrim) |
| CF | 10 | Claire Kearns (Antrim) (0–1) |
| LWF | 11 | Maeve Gilroy (Antrim) (2–0) |
| FF | 12 | Marion Kearns (Antrim) (0–1) |

| Preceded by Gael Linn Cup 1957 | Gael Linn Cup; 1956 – 2016 | Succeeded by Gael Linn Cup 1959 |
