= Gael Linn Cup 1963 =

1963 Camogie competition

Winners
- Champions: Munster (2nd title)

Runners-up
- Runners-up: Leinster

Other
- Matches played: 3

The 1963 Gael Linn Cup was a representative competition for elite level participants in the women's team field sport of camogie. It was won by Munster, who defeated Leinster in the final, played at Gorey.

== Arrangements ==
In the semi-finals, Munster defeated Connacht 5-10 to 1-3 at Pearse Park, while Leinster defeated Ulster 9-3 to 6-0 at Carrickmacross. Munster defeated Leinster in what was described as an exciting and often brilliant final at Gorey. Agnes Hourigan, president of the Camogie Association, wrote in The Irish Press:

Munster were never led. Three times Leinster drew level with them, but in the end it was Munster which put the stronger finish and won well. Score of the match was a brilliant 40-yard goal for Munster by Rene Manley. Within seconds Clare Hanrahan struck at Munster jubilation by scoring from a free and then she whipped over the equalising point just before half-time. With the stage set for drama Josie Mcnamara had to come off for Munster and was replaced by Joan Clancy. Ten minutes from the end Munster got back the lead for the final time. Kathleen Griffin finished off a clever attack with a hard shot to the back of the net and Munster were a goal ahead. The final minutes were tense as Leinster poured attack after attack on to the gallant Munster defence but to no avail.

=== Final stages ===
3 November
Final

Munster	3-2 — 2-2	Leinster

Gorey

Munster	Leinster

Munster:
GK	1	Deirdre Sutton (Cork)
FB	2	Kity Barry-Murphy (Cork)
RWB	3	Bride Giltenane (Limerick)
CB	4	Peg Maloney (Tipperary)
LWB	5	Jose McNamara (Waterford)
MF	6	Terry Geaney (Tipperary) 1–0
MF	7	Lilian Howlett (Waterford) 0–1
MF	8	Deidre Young (Cork) 0–1
RWF	9	Ann Carroll (Tipperary) 1–0
CF	10	Rena Manley (Cork) 1–0
LWF	11	Stephanie O'Connell (Cork)
FF	12	Kathleen Griffin (Tipperary)

Leinster:
GK	1	Eileen Ellard (Wexford)
FB	2	Mary Sinnott (Wexford)
RWB	3	Joanne Murphy (Wexford)
CB	4	Mary Sherlock (Dublin)
LWB	5	Kay Lyons (Dublin)
MF	6	Kit Murphy (Dublin)
MF	7	Kay Rider (Dublin)
MF	8	Margaret Hearne (Wexford)
RWF	9	Claire Hanrahan (Killkenny) 1–2
CF	10	Una O'Connor (Dublin) (captain)
LWF	11	Judy Doyle (1–0) (Dublin)
FF	12	Brid Moran (Kildare)

Preceded by Gael Linn Cup 1962	Gael Linn Cup; 1954 – present	Succeeded by Gael Linn Cup 1964
