= Gael Linn Cup 1962 =

1962 Camogie competition

Winners
- Champions: Leinster (6th title)

Runners-up
- Runners-up: Ulster

Other
- Matches played: 3

The 1962 Gael Linn Cup was a representative competition for elite level participants in the women's team field sport of Camogie. It was won by Leinster, who defeated Ulster in the final, played at Casement Park Belfast.

== Arrangements ==
In the semi-finals Ulster defeated Connacht 2-9 to 3-4 at Carrickmacross and Leinster defeated Munster 7-3 to 5-5 in one of the best matches of the year. Referee Kathleen Griffin halted play after only 20 minutes in the second half of the final at Casement Park instead of the regulation 25 minutes, with the score standing at Leinster 7-2, Ulster 5-3.

A hastily convened meeting of the Central Council members who were present allowed the result to stand and a subsequent Ulster appeal was rejected. Agnes Hourigan wrote in The Irish Press:

Miss Griffin stated that she had played, by her reckoning, the full 25 minutes of the second half, and the Central Council members present then confirmed Leinster as champions.

=== Final stages ===
14 October
Final

| Leinster | 7-2 — 5-9 | Ulster |

Casement Park Belfast

| Leinster | Ulster |

Leinster:
| GK | 1 | Anne Brennan (Louth) |
| FB | 2 | Mary Sinnott (Wexford) |
| RWB | 3 | Nuala Murney (Dublin) |
| CB | 4 | Susan Lennon (Louth) |
| LWB | 5 | Betty Hughes (Dublin) |
| MF | 6 | Kay Ryder (Dublin) |
| MF | 7 | Margaret Hearne (Wexford) |
| MF | 8 | Joan Murphy (Wexford) |
| RWF | 9 | Geraldine Callanan (Laois) (3–0) |
| CF | 10 | Una O'Connor (Dublin) (1–2) |
| LWF | 11 | Judy Doyle (Dublin) (2–1) |
| FF | 12 | Lily Parle (Wexford) (1–0) |

Ulster:
| GK | 1 | Teresa Jordan (Armagh) |
| FB | 2 | Mary Mallon (Armagh) |
| RWB | 3 | Patricia McKeever (Derry) |
| CB | 4 | Chris Hughes (Antrim) |
| LWB | 5 | Margo Kane (Antrim) |
| MF | 6 | Mairéad McAtamney (Antrim) |
| MF | 7 | Sue Ward (Antrim) (1–0) |
| MF | 8 | Leontia Carabine (Antrim) |
| RWF | 9 | Marion Kearns (Antrim) (1–1) |
| CF | 10 | Mary Phil Jameson (Antrim) (1–0) |
| LWF | 11 | Maeve Gilroy (Antrim) (1–1) |
| FF | 12 | Lily Reynolds (Armagh) (1–0) |

| Preceded by Gael Linn Cup 1961 | Gael Linn Cup; 1954 – present | Succeeded by Gael Linn Cup 1963 |
