= Gael Linn Cup 1980 =

Winners
- Champions: Munster (5th title)

Runners-up
- Runners-up: Leinster

Other
- Matches played: 3

The 1980 Gael Linn Cup, the most important representative competition for elite level participants in the women's team field sport of camogie, was won by Munster, who defeated Leinster in the final, played at St John's Park. Munster defeated Ulster 4–8 to 0–2 at Roscrea while Orla Ni Siochain scored 4–1 as Leinster defeated Connacht 6–7 to 1–4 at Castlebar. Goals from Mary O'Leary and Pat Moloney ensured Munster then won the final against Leinster at St John's Park by 2–5 to 2–1 .

Agnes Hourigan, president of the Camogie Association, wrote in the Irish Press:

Although Leinster had a wealth of talent from Dublin, Kilkenny and Wexford, the Munster side, made up aomost completely of players from Cork, the All-Ireland champions, seemed to combine better as a team.

== Gael Linn Trophy ==
In the trophy final Leinster defeated Connacht 10–7 to 0–1 at Castlebar while Munster defeateded Ulster 7–13 to 1–5 at Roscrea. Munster then won the final against Leinster at St John's Park by 1–9 to 3–2.

== Final stages ==
2 November
Final

Munster	2–5 – 2–1	Leinster

St John's Park

Munster	Leinster

|}

Munster:
GK	1	Marion McCarthy (Cork)
FB	2	Claire Harrington (Clare)
RWB	3	Vera Mackey (Limerick)
CB	4	Geraldine O'Brien (Limerick)
LWB	5	Maura Hackett (Tipperary)
MF	6	Helen Mulcair (Limerick)
MF	7	Cathy Landers (Cork)
MF	8	Martha Kearney (Cork)
RWF	9	Mary O'Leary (Cork)
CF	10	Deirdre Lane (Tipperary)
LWF	11	Pauline McCarthy (Limerick)
FF	12	Angela O'Sullivan (Limerick)

Leinster:
GK	1	Anne Carey (Dublin)
FB	2	Ann Downey (Killkenny)
RWB	3	Anne O'Brien (Dublin)
CB	4	Bridie Martin (Killkenny)
LWB	5	Bernie Conway (Dublin)
MF	6	Margaret Farrell (Killkenny)
MF	7	Elsie Walsh (Wexford)
MF	8	Barbara Redmond (Dublin)
RWF	9	Angela Downey (Killkenny)
CF	10	Marion Conroy (Dublin)
LWF	11	Orla Ní Síocháin (Dublin)
FF	12	Mary Mernagh (Dublin)

== Junior Final ==
Final

Munster	1–9 – 3–2	Leinster

St John's Park

Munster	Leinster

|}

Munster:
GK	1	Helen Sheehy (Limerick)
FB	2	Regina O'Brien (Cork)
RWB	3	Eileen Dineen (Cork)
CB	4	Joan O'Sullivan (Cork)
LWB	5	Carmel Moroney (Clare)
MF	6	Betty Joyce (Cork) (captain)
MF	7	Helena Fox (Cork)
MF	8	Ann-Marie Landers (Cork)
RWF	9	Geraldine McCarthy (Cork)
CF	10	Lilian Zinkant (Cork)
LWF	11	Claire Kelleher (Cork)
FF	12	Noelle O'Driscoll (Cork)

Leinster:
GK	1	Vivienne Kelly (Louth)
FB	2	Antoinette Merriman (Kildare)
RWB	3	Catherine Ledwidge (Dublin)
CB	4	Anna Miggin (Kildare)
LWB	5	Joan Naughton (Dublin)
MF	6	Anne Molloy (Offaly)
MF	7	Miriam Malone (Kildare)
MF	8	Mary O'Loughlin (Wicklow)
RWF	9	Germaine Noonan (Dublin)
CF	10	Teresa McCann (Dublin)
LWF	11	Kay Barry (Wicklow)
FF	12	Mary Bermingham (Kildare)

Preceded by Gael Linn Cup 1979	Gael Linn Cup; 1954 – present	Succeeded by Gael Linn Cup 1981
