= Gael Linn Cup 1967 =

Competition in the sport of camogie

Winners
- Champions: Ulster (1st title)

Runners-up
- Runners-up: Leinster

Other
- Matches played: 3

The 1967 Gael Linn Cup, the most important representative competition for elite level participants in the women's team field sport of camogie, was won by Ulster, who defeated Leinster in the final, played at Parnell Park.

== Arrangements ==
An Ulster team with ten Antrim players fresh from their breakthrough All-Ireland success, defeated Connacht 9–14 to 3–0 at Cavan. Leinster defeated Munster 2–5 to 3–0 at Naas. Maeve Gilroy was the star in Ulster's first success in the competition, achieved with ten players from Antrim and two from Down as they defeated Leinster by 5–4 to 5–1 at Parnell Park. Agnes Hourigan wrote in the Irish Press:

The final issue was in the balance until the last five minutes when Ulster lasted the fast pace better than their opponents. Leinster seemed in a strong position leading by twelve points to four when Ulster slammed home two great goals just before half time to leave the score 4–0 to 3–1 in favour of Leinster. Ulster took the lead when Maeve Gilroy pointed and Patricia Craigie scored a goal. Leinster took the lead again in the 20th minute when Nuala Duncan scored a goal from a melee. Ulster showed great determination from this point to the end and were clearly the fitter side, adding first a point then a goal, and finally a point to finish deserving winners.

=== Final stages ===
23 October
Final

Ulster	5–4 – 5–1	Leinster

Parnell Park

Ulster	Leinster

|}

Ulster:
GK	1	Teresa Cassidy (Antrim)
FB	2	Moya Forde (Antrim)
RWB	3	Moira Caldwell (Down)
CB	4	Maeve Gilroy (Antrim) (captain) (0–3)
LWB	5	Kathleen Kelly (Antrim)
MF	6	Mairéad McAtamney (Antrim)
MF	7	Sue Cashman (Antrim) (1–0)
MF	8	Pat Crangle (Down) (1–0)
RWF	9	Marion McFetridge (Antrim)
CF	10	Mairéad Quinn (Antrim)
LWF	11	Eileen Collins (Antrim) (2–0)
FF	12	Lily Scullion (Antrim) (1–1)

Leinster:
GK	1	Eithne Leech (Dublin)
FB	2	Mary Sinnott (Wexford)
RWB	3	Mary Holohan (Killkenny)
CB	4	Margaret O'Leary (Wexford)
LWB	5	Kay Lyons (Dublin)
MF	6	Mary Sherlock (Dublin) (0–1)
MF	7	M Milne (Offaly)
MF	8	Margaret Hearne (Wexford)
RWF	9	Nuala Duncan (Killkenny) (2–0)
CF	10	Una O'Connor (Dublin) (1–0)
LWF	11	Judy Doyle (Dublin) (1–0)
FF	12	Mary Fennelly (Killkenny) (1–0)

Preceded by Gael Linn Cup 1966	Gael Linn Cup; 1954 – present	Succeeded by Gael Linn Cup 1968
