= Gael Linn Cup 1984 =

Winners
- Champions: Leinster (17th title)

Runners-up
- Runners-up: Connacht

Other
- Matches played: 3

The 1984 Gael Linn Cup, the most important representative competition for elite level participants in the women's team field sport of camogie, was won by Leinster, who defeated Connacht in the final, played at Silver Park Kilmacud.

== Arrangements ==
Connacht defeated Ulster in the semi-final by 3–6 to 1–3. Leinster defeated Munster 2–1 to 1–3 in the rain at Adare then Carmel O'Byrne scored 3–2 to help Leinster defeat Connacht by 3–9 to 1–4 at Silver Park.

=== Gael Linn Trophy ===
In the trophy Leinster defeated Munster 2–4 to 1–6 at Adare, Ulster defeated Connacht, 4–6 to 1–6, at Castledaly and Leinster defeated Ulster 3–6 to 1–3 in the final.

=== Final stages ===
21 October
Final

Leinster	3–9 – 1–4	Connacht

Silver Park Kilmacud

Leinster	Connacht

|}

Leinster:
GK	1	Yvonne Redmond (Dublin)
FB	2	Ann Downey (Killkenny)
RWB	3	Germaine Noonan (Dublin)
CB	4	Tina Fitzhenry (Wexford)
LWB	5	Stellah Sinnott (Wexford)
MF	6	Una Crowley (Dublin)
MF	7	Mary Mernagh (Dublin)
MF	8	Biddy O'Sullivan (Killkenny)
RWF	9	Edel Murphy (Dublin)
CF	10	Norah Gahan (Wexford)
LWF	11	Angela Downey (Killkenny)
FF	12	Joan Gormley (Dublin)

Connacht:
GK	1	Breda Coady (Galway)
FB	2	Noreen Treacy (Galway)
RWB	3	Anne Briscoe (Galway)
CB	4	Chris Silke (Galway)
LWB	5	Breda Kenny (Galway)
MF	6	Claire Geraghty (Galway)
MF	7	Anne Gallagher (Galway)
MF	8	Mary Kelly (Galway)
RWF	9	Teresa Raftery (Galway)
CF	10	Madge Hobbins (Galway)
LWF	11	Ane Morris (Galway)
FF	12	Una Jordan (Galway)

== Junior Final ==
Final

Leinster	3–6 – 1–3	Ulster

Silver Park Kilmacud

Leinster	Ulster

|}

Leinster:
GK	1	Toni O'Byrne (Dublin)
FB	2	Mairéad Cronin (Dublin)
RWB	3	Antoinette Merriman (Kildare)
CB	4	Anna Dargan (Kildare)
LWB	5	Patricia Clinton (Dublin)
MF	6	Jo Holden (Dublin)
MF	7	Eunice Keogh (Dublin)
MF	8	Marie Fitzpatrick (Killkenny)
RWF	9	Nuala Smithers (Carlow)
CF	10	Siobhán Cronin (Dublin)
LWF	11	Miriam Malone (Kildare)
FF	12	Adele Campbell (Dublin)

Ulster:
GK	1	Anne McKiernan (Cavan)
FB	2	Margaret Moriarty (Armagh)
RWB	3	Sheila Rafferty (Armagh)
CB	4	[ta Brady (Cavan)
LWB	5	Noeleen McKendry (Derry)
MF	6	Siobhán McKeogh (Fermanagh)
MF	7	Sarah Ann Quinn (Derry)
MF	8	Anne Trainor (Down)
RWF	9	Pauline Robinson (Derry)
CF	10	Denise McStay (Armagh)
LWF	11	Ursula McGivern (Armagh)
FF	12	Patsy Quinn (Derry)

Preceded by Gael Linn Cup 1983	Gael Linn Cup; 1954 – present	Succeeded by Gael Linn Cup 1985
