= Gael Linn Cup 1982 =

Winners
- Champions: Munster (6th title)

Runners-up
- Runners-up: Leinster

Other
- Matches played: 3

The 1982 Gael Linn Cup, the most important representative competition for elite level participants in the women's team field sport of camogie, was won by Munster, who defeated Leinster in the final, played at Na Fianna, Glasnevin.

== Arrangements ==
Leinster defeated Ulster 10–17 to 2–4 at Eglish, Munster defeated Connacht 2–3 to 0–2 at Tynagh. A last minute point by Mary O'Leary, who scored 2–8 in all, helped Munster defeat Leinster 3–10 to 2–12 at Na Fianna Grounds. She had done the same in the All-Ireland final few weeks previously, Munster's other goal came from Marion Sweeney five minutes into the second half, which proved the turning point of the game. Angela Downey scored 1–6 for Leinster, who pressed for an equaliser throughout the three minutes of added time.

=== Gael Linn Trophy ===
Leinster defeated Ulster by 3–11 to 1–4 in the trophy semi-final at Eglish while Connacht defeated Munster 3–3 to 0–5 at Na Fianna. Leinster defeated Connacht by 3–16 to 2–8 in the final.

=== Final stages ===
24 October
Final

Munster	3–10 – 2–12	Leinster

Na Fianna, Glasnevin

Munster	Leinster

|}

Munster:
GK	1	Marian McCarthy (Cork)
FB	2	Eileen Dineen (Cork)
RWB	3	Miriam Higgins (Cork)
CB	4	Cathy Landers (Cork)
LWB	5	Martha Kearney (Cork)
MF	6	Vera Mackey (Limerick)
MF	7	Marian Sweeney (Cork)
MF	8	Ber O'Brien (Limerick)
RWF	9	Mary O'Leary (Cork)
CF	10	Deirde Lane (Tipperary)
LWF	11	Geraldine McCarthy (Cork)
FF	12	Bríd Stokes (Limerick)

Leinster:
GK	1	Kathleen Tonks (Wexford)
FB	2	Anne O'Brien (Dublin)
RWB	3	Ann Downey (Killkenny)
CB	4	Bridie McGarry (Killkenny)
LWB	5	Bernie Toner (Dublin)
MF	6	Elsie Walsh (Wexford)
MF	7	Barbara Redmond (Dublin)
MF	8	Edel Murphy (Dublin)
RWF	9	Anna McManus (Dublin)
CF	10	Marion Conroy (Dublin)
LWF	11	Angela Downey (Killkenny)
FF	12	Jo Dunne (Killkenny)

== Junior Final ==
Final

Leinster	3–16 – 2–8	Connacht

Na Fianna, Glasnevin

Leinster	Connacht

|}

Leinster:
GK	1	Toni O'Byrne (Dublin)
FB	2	Claire Rainey (Dublin)
RWB	3	Antoinette Merriman (Kildare)
CB	4	Mary Daune (Dublin)
LWB	5	Anna Miggan (Kildare)
MF	6	Miriam Malone (Kildare)
MF	7	Anne Thorpe (Dublin)
MF	8	Catherine Ledwidge (Dublin)
RWF	9	Eithne O'Hehir (Dublin)
CF	10	Anne Colgan (Dublin)
LWF	11	Noleen Maguire (Louth)
FF	12	Noreen Fleming (Dublin)

Connacht:
GK	1	Carmel Briscoe (Galway)
FB	2	Anne Gallagher (Galway)
RWB	3	Deirde Dillon (Galway)
CB	4	Claire Geraghty (Galway)
LWB	5	Kitty Hoey (Galway)
MF	6	Mairéad Coyle (Rocommon)
MF	7	Breda Kenny (Galway)
MF	8	Pauline O'Connor (Rocommon)
RWF	9	Jackie Rodgers (Rocommon)
CF	10	Angela Manning (Galway)
LWF	11	Deirde Lawless (Galway)
FF	12	Margaret O'Reilly (Galway)

Preceded by Gael Linn Cup 1981	Gael Linn Cup; 1954 – present	Succeeded by Gael Linn Cup 1983
