= Gael Linn Cup 1992 =

Winners
- Champions: Munster (8th title)

Runners-up
- Runners-up: Leinster

Other
- Matches played: 3

The 1992 Gael Linn Cup, the most important representative competition for elite level participants in the women's team field sport of camogie, was won by Munster, who defeated Leinster in the final, played at O'Toole Park.

== Arrangements ==
Munster defeated Ulster 2–12 to 2–7 at Holycross. Leinster defeated Connacht 6–14 to 1–3 at Turloughmore. Munster, with 19-year-old Deirdre Hughes the only non-Cork player on the team, then defeated Leinster in the final by 1–18 to 2–9. In the Gael Linn trophy semi-final Deirdre Hughes as Munster defeated Ulster 5–6 to 2–7. Connacht defeated Leinster, 2–5 to 1–6. Munster then defeated Connacht 6–11 to 3–3 in the final.

=== Final stages ===
8 November
Final

Munster	1–18 – 2–9	Leinster

O'Toole Park

Munster	Leinster

|}

Munster:
GK	1	Kathleen Costine (Cork)
FB	2	Liz Dunphy (Cork)
RWB	3	Liz Towler (Cork)
CB	4	Therese O'Callaghan (Cork)
LWB	5	Denise Cronin (Cork)
MF	6	Linda Mellerick (Cork)
MF	7	Sandie Fitzgibbon (Cork) (captain)
MF	8	Irene O'Leary (Cork)
RWF	9	Fiona O'Driscoll (Cork)
CF	10	Colette O'Mahony (Cork)
LWF	11	Catherine O'Loughlin (Clare)
FF	12	Deirdre Hughes (Tipperary)

Leinster:
GK	1	Terri Butler (Wexford)
FB	2	Tina Fitzhenry (Wexford)
RWB	3	Una Murphy (Killkenny)
CB	4	Cathy Walsh (Dublin)
LWB	5	Jean O'Leary (Wexford)
MF	6	Stellah Sinnott (Wexford)
MF	7	Ann Downey (Killkenny)
MF	8	Gillian Dillon (Killkenny)
RWF	9	Marina Downey (Killkenny)
CF	10	Ann Reddy (Wexford)
LWF	11	Angela Downey (Killkenny)
FF	12	Bridget Mullally (Killkenny)

== Junior Final ==
Final

Munster	6–11 – 3–3	Connacht

O'Toole Park

Munster	Connacht

|}

Munster:
GK	1	Ailish Delaney (Tipperary)
FB	2	Marguerite Guiry (Limerick)
RWB	3	Ann Marie Fitzgerald (Tipperary)
CB	4	Cora Kennedy (Tipperary)
LWB	5	Claire Madden (Tipperary)
MF	6	Mairéad Treacy (Limerick)
MF	7	Bernie Chawke (Limerick)
MF	8	Triona Bonnar (Tipperary) (captain)
RWF	9	Sinéad Nealon (Tipperary)
CF	10	Pauline McCarthy (Limerick)
LWF	11	Lynn Dunlea (Cork)
FF	12	Deirdre Hughes (Tipperary)

Connacht:
GK	1	Maeve Healy (Rocommon)
FB	2	Brigid Fahy (Galway)
RWB	3	Elaine Kenny (Galway)
CB	4	Carmel Allen (Galway)
LWB	5	Deirdre Connaughton (Rocommon)
MF	6	Dympna Maher (Galway)
MF	7	Margaret Burke (Galway)
MF	8	Teresa Bracken (Rocommon)
RWF	9	Olivia Broderick (Galway)
CF	10	Mary Gannon (Rocommon)
LWF	11	Caitríona Finnegan (Galway)
FF	12	Emer Hardiman (Galway)

Preceded by Gael Linn Cup 1991	Gael Linn Cup; 1954 – present	Succeeded by Gael Linn Cup 1993
