= Gael Linn Cup 1972 =

Winners
- Champions: Leinster (12th title)

Runners-up
- Runners-up: Connacht

Other
- Matches played: 3

The 1972 Gael Linn Cup, the most important representative competition for elite level participants in the women's team field sport of camogie, was won by Leinster, who defeated Connacht in the final, played at Markievicz Park.

== Arrangements ==
Two goals from Anne Sheehy and one each from Elsie Walsh and Orla Ni Siochain helped Leinster defeat a Munster team that had 11 Cork players fresh from their All-Ireland triumph by 4–2 to 1–0 at St Finbarr's. Connacht selected the 12 Galway players who won the All-Ireland junior title to defeat Ulster 6–6 to 5–5 in Sligo. Two goals each from Maura Cassin and Anne Sheehy and one each from Orla Ni Siochain, Ann Crroll and Elsie Walsh helped Leinster win the final by 7–7 to 4–2. Agnes Hourigan wrote in the Irish Press:

Great credit is due to the players of both teams for their display in a match which was played in a downpour and driving cross wind.

=== Final stages ===
29 October
Final

Leinster	7–7 – 4–2	Connacht

Markievicz Park

Leinster	Connacht

Leinster:
GK	1	Sheila Murray (Dublin)
FB	2	Rita Whyte (Dublin)
RWB	3	Joan Murphy (Wexford)
CB	4	Margaret O'Leary (Wexford)
LWB	5	Carmel O'Shea (Killkenny)
MF	6	Breda Cassin (Killkenny)
MF	7	Miriam Miggan (Kildare)
MF	8	Orla Ní Síocháin (Dublin) (1–3)
RWF	9	Anne Sheehy (Dublin) (2–0)
CF	10	Ann Carroll (Killkenny) (captain) (1–1)
LWF	11	Elsie Walsh (Wexford) (1–1)
FF	12	Maura Cassin (Killkenny) (2–2)

Connacht:
GK	1	Margaret Killeen (Galway)
FB	2	Mary Kilkenny (Galway)
RWB	3	Claire Collins (Galway)
CB	4	Kathleen Quinn (Galway)
LWB	5	Rosemary Divilly (Galway)
MF	6	Grace Divilly (Galway)
MF	7	Josie Kelly (Galway)
MF	8	Catherine Ward (Galway)
RWF	9	Nono McHugh (Galway) (captain) (1–0)
CF	10	Jane Murphy (Galway) (1–2)
LWF	11	Sheila Crowe (Galway)
FF	12	Pat Feeney (Galway) (1–0)

Preceded by Gael Linn Cup 1971	Gael Linn Cup; 1954 – present	Succeeded by Gael Linn Cup 1973
