= Gael Linn Cup 1966 =

1966 Camogie competition

Winners
- Champions: Munster (4th title)

Runners-up
- Runners-up: Leinster

Other
- Matches played: 3

The 1966 Gael Linn Cup is a representative competition for elite level participants in the women's team field sport of camogie,. It was won by Munster, who defeated Leinster in the final, played at Ballinlough.

== Arrangements ==
Leinster defeated Connacht by 3–6 to 1–0 at Naas. Munster defeated Ulster 7–3 to 1–4 at Carrickmacross. All the Dublin players, except Kay Ryder, made themselves unavailable for the Gael Linn final at Ballinlough and two goals from Bernie Maloney helped Munster win by 4–2 to 1–3.

Agnes Hourigan, president of the Camogie Association, wrote in The Irish Press:

There was little doubt of Munster's supremacy against Leinster, who lacked the experience to match their opponents.

=== Final stages ===
6 November
Final

Munster	4–2 – 1–3	Leinster

Ballinlough

Munster	Leinster

|}

Munster:
GK	1	Sally Long (Tipperary)
FB	2	Mel Cummin (Cork)
RWB	3	Bride Giltenane (Limerick)
CB	4	Anne Graham (Tipperary)
LWB	5	Bunty Guiry (Limerick)
MF	6	Ann Carroll (Tipperary)
MF	7	Lilian Howlett (Waterford)
MF	8	Peggy Dorgan (Cork)
RWF	9	Margo Loughnane (Tipperary) (1–0)
CF	10	5tephanie O'Connell (Cork) (0–2)
LWF	11	Brenie Maloney (Tipperary) (2–0)
FF	12	Kathleen Griffin (Tipperary) (1–0)

Leinster:
GK	1	Joanne Cullen (Wexford)
FB	2	Mary Hoolahan (Killkenny)
RWB	3	Joan Murphy (Wexford)
CB	4	Margaret O'Leary (Wexford)
LWB	5	Mary Connery (Killkenny)
MF	6	Peg Cash (Wexford)
MF	7	Margaret Hearne (Wexford)
MF	8	Monica Malone (Kildare)
RWF	9	Barbra Magee (Kildare)
CF	10	Kay Rider (Dublin)
LWF	11	Carmel O'Shea (Killkenny)
FF	12	Claire Hanrahan (Killkenny)

Preceded by Gael Linn Cup 1965	Gael Linn Cup; 1954 – present	Succeeded by Gael Linn Cup 1967
