= Gael Linn Cup 1978 =

Winners
- Champions: Leinster (13th title)

Runners-up
- Runners-up: Connacht

Other
- Matches played: 3

The 1978 Gael Linn Cup, the most important representative competition for elite level participants in the women's team field sport of camogie, was won by Leinster, who defeated Connacht in the final, played at Na Fianna, Glasnevin. In 1978 the competition was staged at both senior and junior level for the first time. It was also the first time that the semi-finals and finals were played together on consecutive days. It was the last Gael Linn final to be played with the points bar, an eccentric carry-over from the rules of the game as amended by Congress in 1929.

== Arrangements ==
Leinster overcame Munster in the semi-final and Connacht in the final at Na Fianna's grounds at Mobhi Road, Glansnevin, Dublin. Brigit Doyle scored 2–1 in the unusual position of full-forward while Mary Purcell score two more goals for Leinster. Agnes Hourigan, who was then president of the Camogie Association, wrote in the Irish Press:

Their first three points came from Angela Downey, who had a skillful display at left-forward. Equally impressive were the next two points from Ann Downey, both from within 30 metres of her own goal, from placed balls. Mary Purcell had a Leinster goal and was to add another in the second half. The second half was one-sided and the issue was never in doubt once Mary Purcell and Wexford's Brigit Doyle scored goals midway through the period. Connacht's only score was a late goal from Teresa Duane.

First half goals from Sarah Ann Quinn and Noreen O'Prey helped Munster defeat Leinster 5–1 to 3–2 in the junior semi-final and they then defeated Ulster in the final by 3–2 to 2–1 with a late goal by Annette O'Donovan.

=== Final stages ===
Final

Leinster	4–8 – 2–2	Connacht

Na Fianna, Glasnevin

Leinster	Connacht

|}

Leinster:
GK	1	Sheila Murray(Dublin) (Capt)
FB	2	Margaret Leacy (Wexford)
RWB	3	Ann Downey (Kilkenny)
CB	4	Bridie Martin(Kilkenny)
LWB	5	Catherine Docherty(Dublin)
MF	6	Anna McManus (Dublin) 0–2
MF	7	Dorothy Walsh(Wexford)
MF	8	Mary Fennelly (Kilkenny)
RWF	9	Mary Purcell (Kilkenny) (2–0)
CF	10	Mary Mernagh(Dublin) (0–1)
LWF	11	Angela Downey (Kilkenny) (0–5)
FF	12	Brigit Doyle (Wexford) (2–1)

Connacht:
GK	1	Margaret Killeen(Galway)
FB	2	Breda Larkin(Galway)
RWB	3	Noreen Treacy (Galway)
CB	4	Ann Daune (Galway)
LWB	5	Bridie Glynn (Galway)
MF	6	Midge Poniard (Galway)
MF	7	Bridie Cunniffe (Galway)
MF	8	Una Jordan (Galway) 1–2
RWF	9	Catherine Ward (Galway)
CF	10	Madge Hobbins (Galway)
LWF	11	Anne Morris (Galway) 1–0
FF	12	Teresa Duane (Galway)

== Junior Final ==
Final

Munster	2–2 – 2–1	Ulster

Na Fianna, Glasnevin

Munster	Ulster

|}

Munster:
GK	1	Patricia Fitzgibbon (Cork)
FB	2	Mary Maher(Cork)
RWB	3	Marie Coughlan(Cork) (captain)
CB	4	Betty Joyce(Cork)
LWB	5	Helen O'Sullivan (Limerick)
MF	6	Liz Lynch(Cork)
MF	7	Anne O'Sullivan (Limerick)
MF	8	Anne Delaney (Cork)
RWF	9	Martha Kearney(Cork)
CF	10	Sarah Ryan (Cork)
LWF	11	Eileen Kavanagh(Cork)
FF	12	Annette O'Donovan(Cork)

Ulster:
GK	1	Teresa McDonnell(Monaghan)
FB	2	Margaret Moriarty (Armagh)
RWB	3	Brigid McLoughlin (Derry)
CB	4	Sarah Ann Quinn (Derry)
LWB	5	Eileen McQuillan (Derry)
MF	6	Una Daly (Tyrone)
MF	7	Deirdre Finnegan (Monaghan)
MF	8	Eileen McGeough (Fermanagh)
RWF	9	Kathleen Marrion(Derry)
CF	10	Caroline McWilliams(Derry)
LWF	11	Noreen O'Prey (Down)
FF	12	Noleen McMahon(Monaghan)

Preceded by Gael Linn Cup 1977	Gael Linn Cup; 1954 – present	Succeeded by Gael Linn Cup 1979
