= Gael Linn Cup 1981 =

Winners
- Champions: Leinster (15th title)

Runners-up
- Runners-up: Ulster

Other
- Matches played: 3

The 1981 Gael Linn Cup, the most important representative competition for elite level participants in the women's team field sport of camogie, was won by Leinster, who defeated Ulster in the final, played at Russell Park.

== Arrangements ==
Leinster narrowly defeated Munster 3–9 to 2–11 in the semi-final at Russell Park and then beat Ulster in the final at the same venue by 3–10 to 2–4. Connacht defeated Ulster 5–1 to 3–2 in the trophy semi-final at Eglish in the semi-final and then defeated Munster by 2–3 to 2–2 at Russell Park.

=== Final stages ===
1 November
Final

Leinster	3–10 – 2–4	Ulster

Russell Park

Leinster	Ulster

|}

Leinster:
GK	1	Kathleen Tonks (Wexford)
FB	2	Anne O'Brien (Dublin)
RWB	3	Ann Downey (Killkenny)
CB	4	Dorothy Walsh (Wexford)
LWB	5	Bridie McGarry (Killkenny)
MF	6	Margaret Farrell (Killkenny)
MF	7	Elsie Walsh (Wexford)
MF	8	Barbara Redmond (Dublin)
RWF	9	Orla Ní Síocháin (Dublin)
CF	10	Angela Downey (Killkenny)
LWF	11	Edel Murphy (Dublin)
FF	12	Jo Dunne (Killkenny)

Ulster:
GK	1	Carol Blaney (Antrim)
FB	2	Stephanie Kelly(Down)
RWB	3	Sheila McCartan (Down)
CB	4	Jo McClements (Antrim)
LWB	5	Cathy O'Hare (Down)
MF	6	Jackie McAtamney(Antrim)
MF	7	Brigid McLoughlin (Derry)
MF	8	Teresa Allen (Down)
RWF	9	Bonnie McGreevy (Down)
CF	10	Phil Gillespie (Antrim)
LWF	11	Sarah Ann Quinn (Derry)
FF	12	Mary McMullan (Antrim)

== Junior Final ==
Final

Connacht	2–3 – 2–2	Munster

Russell Park

Connacht	Munster

|}

Connacht:
GK	1	Isobel McGee (Galway)
FB	2	Breda Kenny (Galway)
RWB	3	Deirdre Dillon (Galway)
CB	4	Ann Gallagher (Capt) (Galway)
LWB	5	Carmel Briscoe (Galway)
MF	6	Colette Arnold (Galway)
MF	7	Mairéad Coyle (Rocommon)
MF	8	Pauline O'Connor (Rocommon)
RWF	9	Jackie Rodgers (Rocommon)
CF	10	Mary Ryan (Galway)
LWF	11	Angela Manning(Galway)
FF	12	Margaret O'Reilly (Galway)

Munster:
GK	1	Mary Carey (Clare)
FB	2	Mary Maher (Cork)
RWB	3	Martina O'Donoghue (Limerick)
CB	4	Mary O'Donovan (Cork)
LWB	5	Carmel Moroney (Clare)
MF	6	Veronica Casey (Clare)
MF	7	Margo Twomey (Cork)
MF	8	Clare Jones (Clare)
RWF	9	Lourda Fox (Clare)
CF	10	Ann Marie Landers (Cork)
LWF	11	Stephanie Curtin (Cork)
FF	12	Colette Keating (Clare).

Preceded by Gael Linn Cup 1980	Gael Linn Cup; 1954 – present	Succeeded by Gael Linn Cup 1982
