= Gael Linn Cup 1993 =

Winners
- Champions: Leinster (24th title)

Runners-up
- Runners-up: Ulster

Other
- Matches played: 3

The 1993 Gael Linn Cup, the most important representative competition for elite level participants in the women's team field sport of camogie, was won by Leinster, who defeated Ulster in the final, played at Conneff Park Clane. For the first year of a two-year experimental period, the Gael Linn Cups were played with teams of 15-a-side, as a prelude to the increase in team size from 12 to 15 in 1999 for all matches.

== Arrangements ==
Leinster defeated Munster 5–7 to 2–10 at Clane. Ulster received a walkover from Connacht. Leinster defeated Ulster 6–14 to 1–4 in the final. Irene Kirwan and Annette Heffernan scored Leinster's goals to defeat Munster in the Gael Linn trophy semi-final. Connacht gave Ulster a walkover. Ulster defeated Leinster 4–5 to 1–9 in the final at Clane.

=== Final stages ===
28 November
Final

Leinster	6–14 – 1–4	Ulster

Conneff Park Clane

Leinster	Ulster

Leinster:
GK	1	Louise Curry (Dublin)
RCB	2	Cathy Walsh (Dublin) (captain)
FB	3	Catherine Murphy (Wexford)
LCB	4	Bridie McGarry (Killkenny)
RWB	5	Stella Sinnott (Wexford)
CB	6	Clare Jones (Killkenny)
LWB	7	Tracy Millea (Killkenny)
MF	8	Ann Downey (Killkenny)
MF	9	Una Murphy (Killkenny)
RWF	10	Fiona Dunne (Wexford)
CF	11	Gillian Dillon (Killkenny)
LWF	12	Sinéad Millea (Killkenny)
RCF	13	Bridget Mullally (Killkenny)
FF	14	Siobhán Dunne (Wexford)
LCF	15	Angela Downey (Killkenny)

Ulster:
GK	1	Imelda Gillon (Antrim) (captain)
RCB	2	Marie McAtamney (Antrim)
FB	3	Mary Connolly (Antrim)
LCB	4	Donna McLoughlin (Antrim)
RWB	5	Monica McCartan (Down)
CB	6	Nuala Magee (Down)
LWB	7	Yvonne McKenna (Armagh)
MF	8	Rosemary Merry (Monaghan)
MF	9	Bronagh McCorry (Antrim)
RWF	10	Isobel Oakes (Down)
CF	11	Grace McMullan (Antrim)
LWF	12	Karen Convery (Antrim)
RCF	13	Rose Butler (Antrim)
FF	14	Noelle McGovern (Monaghan)
LCF	15	Elaine McMonagle (Donegal)

== Junior Final ==
Final

Ulster	4–5 – 1–9	Leinster

Conneff Park Clane

Ulster	Leinster

Ulster:
GK	1	Margaret McKee (Armagh)
RCB	2	Pauline Green (Down)
FB	3	Cathy Browne (Armagh)
LCB	4	Anne Coyle (Down)
RWB	5	Colleen Conway (Armagh)
CB	6	Celine McGeary (Armagh)
LWB	7	Orla Murphy (Armagh) (captain)
MF	8	Colette Burn (Armagh)
MF	9	Karen Lee] (Derry)
RWF	10	Brenie McBride (Armagh)
CF	11	Maureen McAleenan (Down)
LWF	12	Deirdre Connolly (Armagh)
RCF	13	Eimear Lee (Derry)
FF	14	Patricia McEvoy (Armagh)
LCF	15	Mary Donnelly (Armagh)

Leinster:
GK	1	Brigid Rosney (Offaly)
RCB	2	Sinéad Costello (Killkenny)
FB	3	Siobhán Aylward (Killkenny)
LCB	4	Mary Smith (Carlow)
RWB	5	Ruth Treacy (Kildare)
CB	6	Aisling Treacy (Kildare)
LWB	7	Marie Maher (Killkenny)
MF	8	Valerie Crean (Carlow)
MF	9	Anne Marie Denihy (Meath)
RWF	10	Hilda Butler (Killkenny)
CF	11	Irene Kirwan (Dublin)
LWF	12	Geraldine Mahon (Offaly)
RCF	13	Michelle Davis (Offaly)
FF	14	Imelda Kennedy (Killkenny)
LCF	15	Annette Heffernan (Westmeath)

Preceded by Gael Linn Cup 1992	Gael Linn Cup; 1954 – present	Succeeded by Gael Linn Cup 1994
