= Gael Linn Cup 1994 =

Winners
- Champions: Munster (9th title)

Runners-up
- Runners-up: Ulster

Other
- Matches played: 3

The 1994 Gael Linn Cup, the most important representative competition for elite level participants in the women's team field sport of camogie, was won by Munster, who defeated Ulster in the final, played at Silver Park Kilmacud. For the second year of a two-year experimental period, the Gael Linn Cups were played with teams of 15-a-side, as a prelude to the increase in team size from 12 to 15 in 1999 for all matches.

== Arrangements ==
Ulster had a surprise 2–10 to 1–12 win over Leinster at Navan. Munster had a walkover from Connacht then defeated an Ulster team which, for the first time, had no Antrim players 4–11 to 2–7 in the final at Silver Park. Ulster defeated Leinster 4–8 to 2–8, in the Gael Linn trophy semi-final at Navan. Munster had to come from behind to defeat an all-Roscommon Connacht 1–11 to 2–4. Pauline McCarthy scored three goals as Munster defeated Ulster 5–9 to 2–12 in the final.

=== Final stages ===
Final

Munster	4–11 – 2–7	Ulster

Silver Park Kilmacud

Munster	Ulster

|}

Munster:
GK	1	Cathleen Costine (Cork)
RCB	2	Claire Madden (Tipperary)
FB	3	Brenda Kenny (Cork)
LCB	4	Liz Towler (Cork)
RWB	5	Paula Coggins (Cork)
CB	6	Therese O'Callaghan (Cork) (captain)
LWB	7	Stephanie Delea (Cork)
MF	8	Eithne Duggan (Cork)
MF	9	Triona Bonnar (Tipperary)
RWF	10	Patricia Murphy (Cork)
CF	11	Lynn Delea (Cork)
LWF	12	Ire O'Keeffe (Cork)
RCF	13	Fiona O'Driscoll (Cork)
FF	14	Deirdre Hughes (Tipperary)
LCF	15	Colette O'Mahony (Cork) .

Ulster:
GK	1	Margaret McKee (Armagh)
RCB	2	Teresa McNally (Armagh)
FB	3	Donna Greeran (Down)
LCB	4	Róisín McCluskey (Derry)
RWB	5	Nuala McGee (Down)
CB	6	Colette Byrne (Armagh)
LWB	7	Orlagh Murphy (Armagh)
MF	8	Mary Black (Armagh) (captain)
MF	9	Olivia McGeown (Armagh)
RWF	10	Brenie McBride (Armagh)
CF	11	Maureen McAleenan (Down)
LWF	12	Grace McMullan (Antrim)
RCF	13	Glenda Fitzpatrick (Fermanagh)
FF	14	Patricia McEvoy (Armagh)
LCF	15	Ursula McGivern (Armagh)

== Junior Final ==
Final

Munster	5–9 – 2–12	Ulster

Silver Park Kilmacud

Munster	Ulster

|}

Munster:
GK	1	Breda O'Brien (Limerick)
RCB	2	Colette Cronin (Cork)
FB	3	Evelyn Healy (Cork)
LCB	4	Agnes Sheehy (Limerick)
RWB	5	Regina O'Mear (Tipperary)
CB	6	Suzanne Kelly (Tipperary)
LWB	7	Brenie O'Brien (Limerick)
MF	8	Maeve Stoke (Tipperary)
MF	9	Vivienne Harris (Cork)
RWF	10	Kay Burke (Limerick)
CF	11	Helen Kiely (Tipperary)
LWF	12	Mary Burke (Limerick)
RCF	13	Martha Butler (Waterford)
FF	14	Pauline McCarthy (Limerick) (captain)
LCF	15	Anna Gleeson (Tipperary)

Ulster:
GK	1	Imelda Gillen (Antrim)
RCB	2	Pauline Green (Down)
FB	3	Mary Rose McGready (Tyrone)
LCB	4	Geraldine Haughey (Armagh)
RWB	5	Deidre Cunning (Antrim)
CB	6	Bronagh McGarry (Antrim)
LWB	7	Claire McCorry (Antrim)
MF	8	Pauline McGuigan (Derry)
MF	9	Leona Fay (Tyrone)
RWF	10	Eimear Brennan (Cavan)
CF	11	Deidre Savage (Down)
LWF	12	Breda Burke (Tyrone)
RCF	13	Rose Butler (Antrim)
FF	14	Mary Donnelly (Armagh)
LCF	15	Bonnie McGreevey (Down)

|}

Preceded by Gael Linn Cup 1993	Gael Linn Cup; 1954 – present	Succeeded by Gael Linn Cup 1995
