= Gael Linn Cup 1983 =

Winners
- Champions: Leinster (16th title)

Runners-up
- Runners-up: Munster

Other
- Matches played: 3

The 1983 Gael Linn Cup, the most important representative competition for elite level participants in the women's team field sport of camogie, was won by Leinster, who defeated Munster in the final, played at Ballinlough.

== Arrangements ==
Leinster defeated Connacht by 5–8 to 1–2 at Mobhi Road. Joan Gormley then scored a goal in the dying seconds of the final against Munster at Ballinlough to win by 2–7 to 1–7. Angela Downey scrambled Leinster's first goal in a goalmouth melee in the first half and Tipeprary's Deirdre Lane had a goal for Munster in the opening minutes.

=== Gael Linn Trophy ===
In the Gael Linn Cup trophy Ulster defeated Munster at Ballymacward by 2–12 to 3–5., Leinster defeated Connacht 4–6 to 1–4 at Mobhi Road. The sides were level on 12 occasions in the final and the match went into extra time before Munster won by 1–12 to 1–11.

=== Final stages ===
23 October
Final

Leinster	2–7 – 1–7	Munster

Ballinlough

Leinster	Munster

Leinster:
GK	1	Yvonne Redmond (Dublin)
FB	2	Anne O'Brien (Dublin)
RWB	3	Geraldine Wynne (Wexford)
CB	4	Bernie Toner (Dublin)
LWB	5	Ann Downey (Killkenny)
MF	6	Biddy O'Sullivan (Killkenny)
MF	7	Mary Mernagh (Dublin)
MF	8	Edel Murphy (Dublin)
RWF	9	Anna Condon (Dublin)
CF	10	Elsie Walsh (Wexford)
LWF	11	Angela Downey (Killkenny)
FF	12	Joan Gormley (Dublin)

Munster:
GK	1	Marian McCarthy (Cork)
FB	2	Eileen Dineen (Cork)
RWB	3	Miriam Higgins (Cork)
CB	4	Cathy Landers (Cork)
LWB	5	Martha Kearney (Cork)
MF	6	Clare Cronin (Cork)
MF	7	Helen Collins (Limerick)
MF	8	Sandie Fitzgibbon (Cork)
RWF	9	Mary O'Leary (Cork)
CF	10	Deirdre Lane (Tipperary)
LWF	11	Bridie Stokes (Limerick)
FF	12	Mary Geaney (Cork)

== Junior final ==
Final

Munster	1–12 – 1–11	Leinster

Ballinlough

Munster	Leinster

Munster:
GK	1	Debbie Cleary (Clare)
FB	2	Mary Maher (Cork)
RWB	3	Mary Ring (Cork)
CB	4	Liz Dunphy (Cork)
LWB	5	Margo Twomey (Cork) (captain)
MF	6	Ann Mari Landers (Cork)
MF	7	Anne Daly (Clare)
MF	8	Mary O'Donovan (Cork)
RWF	9	Maura McNicolas (Clare)
CF	10	Anne Leahy (Cork)
LWF	11	Helen Cusack (Clare)
FF	12	Lilian Zinkant (Cork)

Leinster:
GK	1	Geraldine Sutton (Dublin)
FB	2	Claire Rainey (Dublin)
RWB	3	Anne Hyland (Dublin)
CB	4	Mary Duane (Dublin)
LWB	5	Anna Dargan (Kildare)
MF	6	Jo Holden (Dublin)
MF	7	Eithne O'Hehir (Dublin)
MF	8	Deirdre Byrne (Dublin)
RWF	9	Carmel O'Byrne (Dublin)
CF	10	Miriam Malone (Kildare)
LWF	11	Siobhán Cronin (Dublin)
FF	12	Linda Ford (Westmeath)

Preceded by Gael Linn Cup 1982	Gael Linn Cup; 1954 – present	Succeeded by Gael Linn Cup 1986
