= Gael Linn Cup 1989 =

Winners
- Champions: Leinster (22nd title)

Runners-up
- Runners-up: Munster

Other
- Matches played: 3

The 1989 Gael Linn Cup, the most important representative competition for elite level participants in the women's team field sport of camogie, was won by Leinster, who defeated Munster in the final, played at Silver Park Kilmacud.

== Arrangements ==
Leinster won their seventh successive title. Munster defeated Ulster 9–10 to 1–4 in the semi-final at Burren, County Down. Leinster fell behind to three quick Munster points at the start of the final. Then Angela Downey (2–4), Breda Holmes (2–1), Ann Downey (0–4) and Clare Jones (1–1), scored most of Leinster's 5–12 against 3–6 for Munster, including two goals from Collette O'Mahony.

=== Trophy ===
In the Gael Linn trophy semi-final Leinster defeated Connacht 3–12 to 0–14 at Clane and Ulster defeated Munster 1–12 to 4–2. Sarah Ann Quinn and Mary Donnelly were the stars of Ulster's 1–11 to 2–3 victory over Leinster in the final at Kilmacud.

=== Final stages ===
12 November
Final

Leinster	5–12 – 3–6	Munster

Silver Park Kilmacud

Leinster	Munster

|}

Leinster:
GK	1	Marie Fitzpatrick (Killkenny)
FB	2	Biddy O'Sullivan (Killkenny)
RWB	3	Cathy Walsh (Dublin)
CB	4	Bridie McGarry (Killkenny)
LWB	5	Eileen Kehoe (Wexford)
MF	6	Clare Jones (Killkenny)
MF	7	Ann Downey (Killkenny)
MF	8	Stellah Sinnott (Wexford)
RWF	9	Anna Whelan (Killkenny)
CF	10	Ann Reddy (Wexford)
LWF	11	Angela Downey (Killkenny)
FF	12	Breda Holmes (Killkenny)

Munster:
GK	1	Marian McCarthy (Cork)
FB	2	Liz Dunphy (Cork)
RWB	3	Irene O'Leary (Cork)
CB	4	Noleen Quinn (Clare)
LWB	5	Mags Finn (Cork)
MF	6	Mairéad Toomey (Clare)
MF	7	Therese O'Callaghan (Cork)
MF	8	Siobhán Reidy (Clare)
RWF	9	Colette O'Mahony (Cork)
CF	10	Yvonne McInerney (Clare)
LWF	11	Betty Joyce (Cork)
FF	12	Orla Flynn (Waterford)

== Junior Final ==
Final

Ulster	1–11 – 2–3	Leinster

Silver Park Kilmacud

Ulster	Leinster

Ulster:
GK	1	Laura O'Prey (Down)
FB	2	Anne Coyle (Down)
RWB	3	[ta McKiernan (Cavan)
CB	4	Sarah Ann Quinn (Derry)
LWB	5	Catherine Daly (Tyrone)
MF	6	Bríd Doherty (Derry)
MF	7	Margaret Carroll (Cavan)
MF	8	Olive Leonard (Armagh)
RWF	9	Maureen McAleenan (Down)
CF	10	Monica McCartan (Down)
LWF	11	Mary Black (Armagh)
FF	12	Mary Donnelly (Armagh)

Leinster:
GK	1	Anna Dargan (Kildare)
FB	2	Claire Moloney (Kildare)
RWB	3	Phyllis Bambury (Kildare)
CB	4	Melanie Treacy (Kildare)
LWB	5	Antoinette Merriman (Kildare)
MF	6	Anne Byrne (Wicklow)
MF	7	Miriam Malone (Kildare)
MF	8	Esther Byrne (Wicklow)
RWF	9	Bernie Farrelly (Kildare)
CF	10	Valerie Crean (Carlow)
LWF	11	Nora Maguire (Dublin)
FF	12	Aileen Redmond (Dublin)

Preceded by Gael Linn Cup 1988	Gael Linn Cup; 1954 – present	Succeeded by Gael Linn Cup 1990
