= Gael Linn Cup 1976 =

Winners
- Champions: Leinster (1st junior title)

Runners-up
- Runners-up: Munster

Other
- Matches played: 3

The 1976 Gael Linn Cup, the most important representative competition for elite level participants in the women's team field sport of camogie, was played at junior level only in the three years 1975-7. It was won by Leinster, who defeated Munster in the final, played at Adare.

== Arrangements ==
Munster defeated Connacht by 3–1 to 1–3 at Roscommon, while a late rally by Leinster earned a 4–5 to 1–3victory over Ulster at Mayobridge. Kay Barry snatched a late winning goal for Leinster in the final against Munster at Adare, 2–6 to 2–3.

=== Final stages ===
Final

Leinster	2–6 – 2–3	Munster

Adare

Leinster	Munster

|}

Leinster:
GK	1	Ann Butler (Wexford)
FB	2	Terry Lynch (Kildare)
RWB	3	Geraldine Duggan (Wexford)
CB	4	Martina Cousins (Wexford)
LWB	5	Bernie Whistler (Dublin)
MF	6	Fiona Cousins (Wexford)
MF	7	Mary O'Loughlin (Wicklow)
MF	8	Miriam Miggan (Kildare)
RWF	9	Ann O'Neill (Wicklow)
CF	10	Monica O'Leary (Wexford)
LWF	11	Kathleen O'Neill (Wicklow)
FF	12	Kay Barry (Wicklow)

Munster:
GK	1	Helen Butler (Limerick)
FB	2	Mary Roche (Cork)
RWB	3	Betty Joyce (Cork)
CB	4	Geraldine O'Brien (Limerick)
LWB	5	Margie Neville (Limerick)
MF	6	Vera Mackey (Limerick)
MF	7	Marian Doyle (Limerick)
MF	8	Bernadette O'Brien (Limerick)
RWF	9	Brigid Darcy (Limerick)
CF	10	Carrie Clancy (Limerick)
LWF	11	Ger Ring (Cork)
FF	12	Brid Stokes(Limerick)

Preceded by Gael Linn Cup 1975	Gael Linn Cup; 1954 – present	Succeeded by Gael Linn Cup 1977
