= Gael Linn Cup 1961 =

1961 Camogie competition

Winners
- Champions: Munster (1st title)

Runners-up
- Runners-up: Connacht

Other
- Matches played: 3

The 1961 Gael Linn Cup was a representative competition for elite level participants in the women's team field sport of Camogie. It was won by Munster, who defeated Connacht in the final, played at Pearse Park Galway.

== Arrangements ==
Leinster suffered their first defeat in the competition, surprisingly losing their semi-final to Connacht by 7–3 to 5–1 at Pearse Park. A dramatic late goal by Kathleen Downes helped Munster defeat Ulster by 4–1 to 2–6 in the other semi-final at Roscrea. Munster then won their first title by 5–2 to 1–0 against Connacht in heavy rain at Pearse Park.

The end of Leinster dominance was regarded as a healthy development just as interest in inter-provincial Camogie showed a danger of waning. Agnes Hourigan, president of the Camogie Association, wrote in The Irish Press:

As Leinster won this competition in all previous years since its inauguration, the trophy must have new holders this season, which is all to the good, for the dominance of Leinster in the cup must eventually have killed the competition from the standpoint of public interest.

=== Final stages ===
22 October
Final

Munster	5–2 – 1–0	Connacht

Pearse Park Galway

Munster	Connacht

|}

Munster:
GK	1	Honor O'Flynn (Tipperary)
FB	2	Josie McNamara (Waterford)
RWB	3	Peg Maloney (Tipperary)
CB	4	Pat Doyle (Waterford)
LWB	5	Joanne Clancy (Cork)
MF	6	Bride Scully (Tipperary) (0–2)
MF	7	Terry Griffin (Tipperary)
MF	8	Lil Coughlan (Cork)
RWF	9	Tess Maloney (Tipperary) (2–0)
CF	10	Kathleen Griffin (Tipperary) (1–0)
LWF	11	Kathleen Downs (Tipperary) (1–0)
FF	12	Eithne Neville (Limerick) (1–0)

Connacht:
GK	1	Eileen Naughton (Galway)
FB	2	Jose Ruane (Mayo)
RWB	3	Ronnie Heneghan (Galway)
CB	4	Margaret Kelly (Mayo)
LWB	5	Sheila Toney (Galway)
MF	6	Kathleen Higgins (Galway)
MF	7	Kathleen Quinn (Galway)
MF	8	Chris Conway (Galway) (captain)
RWF	9	Frances Fox (Galway)
CF	10	Eileen Niland (Galway)
LWF	11	Carmel McHugh (Mayo)
FF	12	Frances Clark (Mayo)

Preceded by Gael Linn Cup 1960	Gael Linn Cup; 1954 – present	Succeeded by Gael Linn Cup 1962
