= Gael Linn Cup 1991 =

Winners
- Champions: Leinster (23rd title)

Runners-up
- Runners-up: Munster

Other
- Matches played: 3

The 1991 Gael Linn Cup, the most important representative competition for elite level participants in the women's team field sport of camogie, was won by Leinster, who defeated Munster in the final, played at O'Toole Park.

== Arrangements ==
Leinster defeated Ulster at Navan, Munster got a walkover from Connacht. Leinster defeated Munster 5–12 to 0–7 in the final with Angela Downey scoring 3–4 and Carmel Byrne 2–1, including the third-minute goal that set the tone for the match.

The Irish Press reported

But for some brilliant goalkeeping by Munster goalkeeper Trish O'Grady the score could have been doubled.

=== Gael Linn Trophy ===
Ulster defeated Leinster 4–9 to 0–8 at Navan. In the other semi-final and Munster had a walkover from Connacht. Sarah Ann McNicholl, Mary Black, Rosie Butler and Margaret Carroll scored Ulster's goals in the final as Ulster defeated Munster by 4–5 to 0–6, using eight of Down's All-Ireland junior winning team.

=== Final stages ===
3 November
Final

Leinster	5–12 – 0–7	Munster

O'Toole Park

Leinster	Munster

Leinster:
GK	1	Marie Fitzpatrick (Killkenny)
FB	2	Biddy O'Sullivan (Killkenny)
RWB	3	Elsie Cody (Wexford) (captain)
CB	4	Cathy Walsh (Dublin)
LWB	5	Catherine Murphy (Wexford)
MF	6	Ann Downey (Killkenny)
MF	7	Gillian Dillon (Killkenny)
MF	8	Marina Downey (Killkenny)
RWF	9	Miriam Malone (Kildare)
CF	10	Angela Downey (Killkenny)
LWF	11	Carmel O'Byrne (Dublin)
FF	12	Stella Sinnott (Wexford)

Munster:
GK	1	Patricia O'Grady (Clare)
FB	2	Liz Dunphy (Cork)
RWB	3	Paula Goggins (Cork)
CB	4	Sandie Fitzgibbon (Cork)
LWB	5	Liz Towler (Cork)
MF	6	Yvonne McInerney (Clare)
MF	7	Therése O'Callaghan (Cork) (captain)
MF	8	Jean Paula Kent (Cork)
RWF	9	Iren O'Leary (Cork)
CF	10	Ine O'Keeffe (Cork)
LWF	11	Pauline O'Brien (Clare)
FF	12	Liz O'Neill (Cork)

== Junior Final ==
Final

Ulster	4–5 – 0–6	Munster

O'Toole Park

Ulster	Munster

|}

Ulster:
GK	1	Laura O'Prey (Down)
FB	2	Anne Coyle (Down) (captain)
RWB	3	Nuala McCartan (Down)
CB	4	Teresa Allen (Down)
LWB	5	Catherine Daly (Tyrone)
MF	6	Olive Leonard (Armagh)
MF	7	Margaret Carroll (Cavan)
MF	8	Bernadette Kelly (Down)
RWF	9	Isabel Oakes (Down)
CF	10	Maureen McAleenan (Down)
LWF	11	Bonnie McGreevy (Down)
FF	12	Sarah Ann McNicholl (Derry)

Munster:
GK	1	Patricia Toomey (Limerick)
FB	2	Evelyn Healy (Cork)
RWB	3	Marguerite Guiry (Limerick)
CB	4	Agnes Sheehy (Limerick)
LWB	5	Orla Hogan (Tipperary)
MF	6	Ann Lenihan (Limerick)
MF	7	Claire Madden (Tipperary)
MF	8	Mary Lenihan (Limerick)
RWF	9	Ann Skeahan (Tipperary)
CF	10	Fiona O'Driscoll (Cork)
LWF	11	Anne Gleeson (Tipperary)
FF	12	Deirdre Hughes (Tipperary)

Preceded by Gael Linn Cup 1990	Gael Linn Cup; 1954 – present	Succeeded by Gael Linn Cup 1992
