= Gael Linn Cup 1988 =

Winners
- Champions: Leinster (21st title)

Runners-up
- Runners-up: Connacht

Other
- Matches played: 3

The 1988 Gael Linn Cup, the most important representative competition for elite level participants in the women's team field sport of camogie, was won by Leinster, who defeated Connacht in the final, played at Silver Park Kilmacud.

== Arrangements ==
Leinster extended their unbeaten run in the competition to six years with an 8–9 to 0–2 win over Ulster at Ballyholland, County Down, and Connacht surprised Munster 3–10 to 1–7 at Killimor. Leinster defeated Connacht 2–9 to 2–4 in the final at Kilmacud. Connacht took an early lead through Ann Ryan but Leinster took control soon afterwards with goals from Kilkenny's Angela Downey and Breda Holmes and led 2–5 to 0–3 at half time. Munster won their third successive Gael-Linn Junior Trophy defeating Connacht 3–7 to 1–2 at Killimor and Leinster by 4–3 to 3–5 at Kilmacud.

=== Final stages ===
6 November
Final

| Leinster | 2–9 – 2–4 | Connacht |

Silver Park Kilmacud

| Leinster | Connacht |

Leinster:
| GK | 1 | Marie Fitzpatrick (Kilkenny) |
| FB | 2 | Elsie Cody (Wexford) (captain) |
| RWB | 3 | Germaine Noonan (Dublin) |
| CB | 4 | Mairéad Cronin (Dublin) |
| LWB | 5 | Biddy O'Sullivan (Kilkenny) |
| MF | 6 | Clare Jones (Kilkenny) |
| MF | 7 | Ann Downey (Kilkenny) |
| MF | 8 | Anna Whelan (Kilkenny) |
| RWF | 9 | Eileen Kehoe (Wexford) |
| CF | 10 | Breda Holmes (Kilkenny) |
| LWF | 11 | Angela Downey (Kilkenny) |
| FF | 12 | Anne Cooper (Dublin) |

Connacht:
| GK | 1 | Patricia Mitchell (Galway) |
| FB | 2 | Sheila Coen (Galway) |
| RWB | 3 | Julie Glynn (Galway) |
| CB | 4 | Bríd Stratford (Galway) |
| LWB | 5 | Kathleen Garvey (Galway) |
| MF | 6 | Teresa Raftery (Galway) |
| MF | 7 | Mary Kelly (Galway) |
| MF | 8 | Ann Coleman (Galway) |
| RWF | 9 | Imelda Hobbins (Galway) |
| CF | 10 | Deidre Costelloe (Galway) |
| LWF | 11 | Anne Ryan (Galway) |
| FF | 12 | Bridie Cunniffe (Galway) |

== Junior Final ==
Final

| Munster | 4–3 – 3–5 | Leinster |

Silver Park Kilmacud

| Munster | Leinster |

Munster:
| GK | 1 | Maria O'Brien (Cork) |
| FB | 2 | Helen Cagney (Limerick) |
| RWB | 3 | Evelyn Healy (Cork) |
| CB | 4 | Frances Broderick (Limerick) |
| LWB | 5 | Marguerite Guiry (Limerick) (captain) |
| MF | 6 | Angela O'Sullivan (Limerick) |
| MF | 7 | Breda Kelly (Cork) |
| MF | 8 | Liz O'Sullivan (Cork) |
| RWF | 9 | Mary Lenihan (Limerick) |
| CF | 10 | Fiona O'Driscoll (Cork) |
| LWF | 11 | Ire O'Keeffe (Cork) |
| FF | 12 | Pauline McCarthy (Limerick) |

Leinster:
| GK | 1 | Rose Merriman (Kildare) |
| FB | 2 | Anna Dargan (Kildare) |
| RWB | 3 | Patsy Murphy (Dublin) |
| CB | 4 | Melanie Treacy (Kildare) |
| LWB | 5 | Carmel Gray (Dublin) (captain) |
| MF | 6 | Eileen Crehan (Louth) |
| MF | 7 | Miriam Malone (Kildare) |
| MF | 8 | Esther Byrne (Wicklow) |
| RWF | 9 | Bernie Farrelly (Kildare) |
| CF | 10 | Ger Dunne (Dublin) |
| LWF | 11 | Margaret Ryan (Carlow) |
| FF | 12 | Adele Campbell (Dublin) |

| Preceded by Gael Linn Cup 1987 | Gael Linn Cup; 1954 – present | Succeeded by Gael Linn Cup 1989 |
