= Gael Linn Cup 1970 =

Winners
- Champions: Leinster (10th title)

Runners-up
- Runners-up: Ulster

Other
- Matches played: 3

The 1970 Gael Linn Cup, the most important representative competition for elite level participants in the women's team field sport of camogie, was won by Leinster, who defeated Ulster in the final, played at Carrickmacross.

== Arrangements ==
UCD players, Ann Carroll who scored 2–3 and Jo Golden who played in goal helped Leinster defeat Munster 3–5 to 1–2 at Gorey. Connacht gave a walkover to Ulster. Kilkenny's Helena O'Neill scored four goals and Dublin's Judy Doyle three and Orla Ni Siochain two as Leinster defeated Ulster by 12–2 to 4–1 in the final.

Agnes Hourigan, president of the Camogie Association, wrote in the Irish Press:

Leinster's craft, combination and experience proved too much for Ulster and, except for a slow star, and a brief period in the second half, the visitors were always in command.

=== Final stages ===
25 October
Final

Leinster	12–2 – 4–1	Ulster

Carrickmacross,

Leinster	Ulster

|}

Leinster:
GK	1	Jo Golden (Killkenny) (captain)
FB	2	Mary Ryan (Dublin)
RWB	3	Joanne Murphy (Wexford)
CB	4	Margaret O'Leary (Wexford)
LWB	5	Bridget O'Connor (Wexford)
MF	6	Liz Neary (Killkenny)
MF	7	Ann Carroll (Killkenny) (1–1)
MF	8	Orla Ni Siochain (Dublin) (2–1)
RWF	9	Helena O'Neill (Killkenny) (4–0)
CF	10	Anne Kehoe (Wexford) (1–0)
LWF	11	Judy Doyle (Dublin) (3–0)
FF	12	Maura Cassin (1–0)

Ulster:
GK	1	Theresa Cassidy (Antrim)
FB	2	Moya Ford (Antrim]] (captain)
RWB	3	Anne McCone (Armagh)
CB	4	Moira Caldwell (Down)
LWB	5	Kathleen Kelly (Antrim)
MF	6	Angela Toal (Armagh)
MF	7	Kathleen Diamond (Derry)
MF	8	Mairéad McAtamney (Antrim) (1–0)
RWF	9	Patricia McGreevy (Monaghan) (1–0)
CF	10	Anne McIvor (Antrim) (1–0)
LWF	11	Chris Boyle (Antrim) (1–1)
FF	12	Lilly Scullion (Antrim)

Preceded by Gael Linn Cup 1969	Gael Linn Cup; 1954 – present	Succeeded by Gael Linn Cup 1971
