= Gael Linn Cup 1990 =

Winners
- Champions: Munster (7th title)

Runners-up
- Runners-up: Ulster

Other
- Matches played: 3

The 1990 Gael Linn Cup, the most important representative competition for elite level participants in the women's team field sport of camogie, was won by Munster, who defeated Ulster in the final, played at Ballyholland.

== Arrangements ==
Patricia O'Grady from Clare was the star of the competition, scoring a last minute to defeat eight-in-a-row seeking Leinster, who were without Angela Downey, at Farranlea Road. She then scored 9–1 in Ulster's 10–10 to 1–2 victory in the final at Ballyholland. Munster's Paula Carey, Jean Paula Kent and Mary Lenihan scored the goals for Munster as they defeated Leinster by 5–12 to 3–6 in the Gael Linn trophy semi-final at Farranlea Road. Ulster defeated Munster 5–11 to 5–3 in the final at Ballyholland.

=== Final stages ===
4 November
Final

Munster	10–10 – 1–2	Ulster

Ballyholland

Munster	Ulster

|}

Munster:
GK	1	Marian McCarthy (Cork)
FB	2	Liz Dunphy (Cork) (captain)
RWB	3	Paula Goggins (Cork)
CB	4	Breda Kenny (Cork)
LWB	5	Siobhán Reidy (Clare)
MF	6	Therese O'Callaghan (Cork)
MF	7	Colette O'Mahony (Cork)
MF	8	Linda Mellerick (Cork)
RWF	9	Mairéad Toomey (Clare)
CF	10	Irene O'Leary (Cork)
LWF	11	Liz O'Neill (Cork)
FF	12	Patricia O'Grady (Clare)

Ulster:
GK	1	Mairéad McAtamney (Antrim)
FB	2	Mary McMullan (Antrim)
RWB	3	Olive Scoir (Cavan)
CB	4	Teresa Allen (Down)
LWB	5	Donna O'Loughlin (Antrim)
MF	6	Grace McMullan (Antrim)
MF	7	Deirde O'Doherty(Derry)
MF	8	Elaine McMonagle(Derry)
RWF	9	Sinéad O'Kane(Derry)
CF	10	Monica Woolahan (Derry)
LWF	11	Mary Devine (Donegal)
FF	12	Anne McGrath (Donegal)

== Junior Final ==
Final

Ulster	5–11 – 5–3	Munster

Ballyholland

Ulster	Munster

|}

Ulster:
GK	1	Laura O'Prey (Down)
FB	2	Anne Coyle (Down)
RWB	3	[ta McKiernan (Cavan)
CB	4	Sally McCone(Armagh)
LWB	5	Bernie McGlone(Derry)
MF	6	Monica McCartan (Down)
MF	7	Margaret Carroll (Cavan)
MF	8	Olive Leonard (Armagh) (captain)
RWF	9	Maureen McAleenan (Down)
CF	10	Ellen Donnelly (Armagh)
LWF	11	Bríd Doherty(Derry)
FF	12	Rosita McCabe (Cavan)

Munster:
GK	1	Ann Keeshan(Tipperary)
FB	2	Marguerite Guiry (Limerick)
RWB	3	Mairéad Treacy (Limerick)
CB	4	Evelyn Healy (Cork)
LWB	5	Claire Madden (Tipperary)
MF	6	Denise Cronin (Cork)
MF	7	Marie Collins (Clare)
MF	8	Ann Lenihan (Limerick)
RWF	9	Jean Paula Kent (Cork)
CF	10	Mary Lenihan (Limerick)
LWF	11	Deirdre Hughes (Tipperary)
FF	12	Paula Carey (Cork)

Preceded by Gael Linn Cup 1989	Gael Linn Cup; 1954 – present	Succeeded by Gael Linn Cup 1991
