= Gael Linn Cup 1987 =

Winners
- Champions: Leinster (20th title)

Runners-up
- Runners-up: Connacht

Other
- Matches played: 3

The 1987 Gael Linn Cup, the most important representative competition for elite level participants in the women's team field sport of camogie, was won by Leinster, who defeated Connacht in the final, played at Silver Park Kilmacud.

== Arrangements ==
Angela Downey scored 4–5 as Leinster defeated Munster by 5–6 to 0–7 at Clane. Connacht defeated Ulster by nine points. Carmel Byrne scored 5–3 as Leinster won the final by 8–11 to 0–5 at Kilmacud's grounds in Glenalbyn. Leinster led 3–5 to 0–3 at half time.

=== Gael Linn Trophy ===
In the Gael Linn trophy semi-final at Clane Munster defeated Leinster 2–5 to 0–10 and defeated Ulster 2–6 to 2–5 in the final at Kilmacud's grounds in Silver Park.

=== Final stages ===
1 November
Final

Leinster	8–11 – 0–5	Connacht

Silver Park Kilmacud

Leinster	Connacht

|}

Leinster:
GK	1	Marie Fitzpatrick (Kilkenny)
FB	2	Rita Weymes (Kilkenny)
RWB	3	Mairéad Cronin (Dublin)
CB	4	Bridie McGarry (Kilkenny)
LWB	5	Biddy O'Sullivan (Kilkenny)
MF	6	Una Crowley (Dublin)
MF	7	Ann Downey (Kilkenny)
MF	8	Clare Jones (Kilkenny)
RWF	9	Carmel Byrne (Dublin)
CF	10	Edel Murphy (Dublin) (captain)
LWF	11	Angela Downey (Kilkenny)
FF	12	Breda Holmes (Kilkenny)

Connacht:
GK	1	Anne Murray (Galway)
FB	2	Angela Cooney (Galway)
RWB	3	Geraldine Heavey (Galway)
CB	4	Bríd Stratford (Galway)
LWB	5	Julia Glynn (Galway)
MF	6	Anne Coleman (Galway)
MF	7	Mary Kelly (Galway)
MF	8	Theresa Raftery (Galway)
RWF	9	Anna Fahey (Galway)
CF	10	Anna Ryan (captain) (Galway)
LWF	11	Deidre Lawless (Galway)
FF	12	Sheila Cohen (Galway)

== Junior Final ==
Final

Munster	2–6 – 2–5	Ulster

Silver Park Kilmacud

Munster	Ulster

|}

Munster:
GK	1	Rose Desmond (Cork) (captain)
FB	2	Mairéad Treacy (Limerick)
RWB	3	Patricia Toomey (Limerick)
CB	4	Evelyn Healy (Cork)
LWB	5	Orla Flynn (Waterford)
MF	6	Karen Mellerick (Cork)
MF	7	Frances Broderick (Limerick)
MF	8	Patricia Barry (Waterford)
RWF	9	Ire O'Keeffe (Cork)
CF	10	Paula Carey (Cork)
LWF	11	Therese O'Callaghan (Cork)
FF	12	Jean Paula Kent (Cork)

Ulster:
GK	1	Josie McLoughlin (Tyrone)
FB	2	Jean McQuillan (Derry)
RWB	3	Anne Daly (Tyrone)
CB	4	Sarah Ann Quinn (Derry)
LWB	5	Sally McCone (Armagh)
MF	6	Rosemary Treanor (Down)
MF	7	Margaret Carroll (Cavan)
MF	8	Catherine Daly (Tyrone)
RWF	9	Maureen McAleenan (Down)
CF	10	Pasy Quinn (Derry)
LWF	11	Sheila Burke (Tyrone)
FF	12	Denise McStay (Armagh)

Preceded by Gael Linn Cup 1986	Gael Linn Cup; 1954 – present	Succeeded by Gael Linn Cup 1988
