= Gael Linn Cup 1971 =

Winners
- Champions: Leinster (11th title)

Runners-up
- Runners-up: Ulster

Other
- Matches played: 3

The 1971 Gael Linn Cup, the most important representative competition for elite level participants in the women's team field sport of camogie, was won by Leinster, who defeated Ulster in the final, played at Parnell Park.

== Arrangements ==
Leinster defeated Connacht at Parnell Park, scoring 7–4 without reply. Ulster defeated Munster by a point in Carrickmacross, 4–3 to 3–5. Leinster pulled away in the second half of the final with three goals from Jose Kehoe and two from Orla Ni Siochain to win by 5–4 to 0–5.

Agnes Hourigan, president of the Camogie Association, wrote in the Irish Press:

The game was won and lost in the ten minutes after the interval when Leinster scored three goals and two points and Ulster's only score was a point from a thirty.

=== Final stages ===
30 October
Final

Leinster	6–4 – 0–5	Ulster

Parnell Park

Leinster	Ulster

|}

Leinster:
GK	1	Teresa Sheil (Wexford)
FB	2	Mary Ryan (Dublin)
RWB	3	Joanne Murphy (Wexford)
CB	4	Margaret O'Leary (Wexford) (captain)
LWB	5	Carmel O'Shea (Killkenny)
MF	6	Anne Kehoe (Wexford) (0–1)
MF	7	Annie Sheehy (Dublin)
MF	8	Elsa Walsh (Wexford) (0–1)
RWF	9	Helena O'Neill (Killkenny)
CF	10	Mary Walsh (Wexford) (0–1)
LWF	11	Orla Ni Siochain (Dublin) (2–0)
FF	12	Jose Kehoe (Wexford) (3–1)

Ulster:
GK	1	Theresa Cassidy (Antrim)
FB	2	Kathleen McCann (Down)
RWB	3	Annie McCone (Armagh)
CB	4	Mairead Diamond (Antrim)
LWB	5	Kathleen Kelly (Antrim)
MF	6	Kathleen Fee (Tyrone)
MF	7	Sue Cashman (Antrim) (captain) (0–1)
MF	8	Mairéad McAtamney (Antrim) (0–2)
RWF	9	Pat Crangle (Down)
CF	10	Chris Boyle (Antrim)
LWF	11	Marian Delaney (Armagh) (0–2)
FF	12	Lilly Scullion (Antrim)

Preceded by Gael Linn Cup 1970	Gael Linn Cup; 1954 – present	Succeeded by Gael Linn Cup 1972
