= Gael Linn Cup 1998 =

Winners
- Champions: Munster (13th title)

Runners-up
- Runners-up: Leinster

Other
- Matches played: 3

The 1998 Gael Linn Cup, the most important representative competition for elite level participants in the women's team field sport of camogie, was won by Munster, who defeated Leinster in the final, played at St Vincents.

== Arrangements ==
Leinster defeated Connacht 2–7 to 2–4, Munster defeated Ulster 5–19 to 2–13 and Fiona O'Driscoll, scored 3–9 as Munster defeated Leinster 6–20 to 1–11 for their fourth successive title.

=== Gael Linn Trophy ===
Ulster defeated Munster 1–13 to 1–11 at St Vincent's Grounds. Leinster defeated Connacht 3–12 to 2–8. Goals from Brenda Burke, Shauna McCaul and Leona Fay helped Ulster defeated 3–12 to 1–12 in the final.

=== Final stages ===
Final

| Munster | 6–20 – 1–11 | Leinster |

St Vincents

| Munster | Leinster |

|}

Munster:
| GK | 1 | Cora Keohane (Cork) |
| FB | 2 | Eithne Duggan (Cork) |
| RWB | 3 | Mag Finn (Cork) |
| CB | 4 | Ciara Gaynor (Tipperary) |
| LWB | 5 | Claire Madden(Tipperary) |
| MF | 6 | Ursula Tory (Cork) |
| MF | 7 | Mary O'Connor (Cork) |
| MF | 8 | Catherine O'Loughlin (Clare) |
| RWF | 9 | Vera Sheehan (Limerick) |
| CF | 10 | Fiona O'Driscoll (Cork) |
| LWF | 11 | Moira McMahon (Clare) |
| FF | 12 | Deirdre Hughes (Tipperary) |

Leinster:
| GK | 1 | Miriam Holland (Killkenny) |
| FB | 2 | Cathy Walsh (Dublin) |
| RWB | 3 | Tracey Millea (Killkenny) |
| CB | 4 | Germaine Noonan (Dublin) |
| LWB | 5 | Catherine Boyle (Dublin) |
| MF | 6 | Marina Downey (Killkenny) |
| MF | 7 | Áine Codd (Wexford) |
| MF | 8 | Patricia Clinton (Dublin) |
| RWF | 9 | Sonya Byrne (Dublin) |
| CF | 10 | Bridget Mullally (Killkenny) |
| LWF | 11 | Mag Kelly (Wexford) |
| FF | 12 | Patrica Murphy (Dublin) |

== Junior Final ==
Final

| Ulster | 3–12 – 1–12 | Leinster |

St Vincents

| Ulster | Leinster |

Ulster:
| GK | 1 | Teresa McGowan (Down) |
| FB | 2 | Donna Greeran (Down) |
| RWB | 3 | Paula Daly (Fermanagh) |
| CB | 4 | Nuala Magee (Down) |
| LWB | 5 | Mary Rose McGrady (Tyrone) |
| MF | 6 | Martina Mulholland (Derry) |
| MF | 7 | Shauna McCaul (Derry) |
| MF | 8 | Majella Murray (Down) |
| RWF | 9 | Jane Adams (Antrim) |
| CF | 10 | Michelle Corry (Fermanagh) |
| LWF | 11 | Breda Burke (Tyrone) |
| FF | 12 | Leona Fay (Tyrone) |

Leinster:
| GK | 1 | Niamh Leahy (Dublin) |
| FB | 2 | Nuala Kerrigan (Kildare) |
| RWB | 3 | Bernie Holohan (Wexford) |
| CB | 4 | Melanie Treacy (Kildare) |
| LWB | 5 | Liz O'Donoghue (Kildare) |
| MF | 6 | Louise O'Hara (Dublin) |
| MF | 7 | Michelle Davis (Offaly) |
| MF | 8 | Sarah Weir (Dublin) |
| RWF | 9 | Nuala Quirke (Carlow) |
| CF | 10 | Valerie Crean (Carlow) |
| LWF | 11 | Miriam Malone (Kildare) |
| FF | 12 | Maggie Lynch (Offaly) |

| Preceded by Gael Linn Cup 1997 | Gael Linn Cup; 1954 – present | Succeeded by Gael Linn Cup 1999 |
