= Gael Linn Cup 2000 =

Tournament details
- Sponsor: Schwarzkopf

Winners
- Champions: Connacht (2nd title)

Runners-up
- Runners-up: Ulster

Other
- Matches played: 3

The 2000 Gael Linn Cup, the most important representative competition for elite level participants in the women's team field sport of camogie, was won by Connacht, who defeated Ulster in the final, played at Bohernabreena. It was the only time these two provinces met in the final. Therese Maher of Connacht and Siobhán Convery of Ulster were named Schwarzkopf senior and junior players of the tournament.

== Arrangements ==
The tournament at St Anne's, Boheranbreena produced an unusual final pairing between the two weaker provinces for the first time, Ulster defeated Leinster 3–15 to 1–12. Connacht defeated Munster 2–12 to 0–11 and Ulster in the final 3–10 to 0–3 to win their first title since 1974 and third in all.

=== Gael Linn Trophy ===
Ulster defeated Leinster 3–9 to 1–8. Munster defeated Connacht 7–18 to 0–8. Ulster defeated Munster 1–10 to 2–6 in the final.

=== Final stages ===
Final

Connacht	1–10 – 0–3	Ulster

Bohernabreena

Connacht	Ulster

|}

Connacht:
GK	1	Fiona Gohery (Galway)
RCB	2	Tracey Laheen (Galway)
FB	3	Anne Broderick (Galway)
LCB	4	Pamela Nevin (Galway)
RWB	5	Martina Haverty (Galway)
CB	6	Áine Hillary (Galway)
LWB	7	Olivia Broderick (Galway)
MF	8	Michelle Glynn (Galway)
MF	9	Carmel Hannon (Galway)
RWF	10	Orla Kilkenny (Galway)
CF	11	Therese Maher (Galway)
LWF	12	Sandra Tannian (Galway)
RCF	13	Anne Forde (Galway)
FF	14	Colette Nevin (Galway)
LCF	15	Veronica Curtin (Galway)

Ulster:
GK	1	Maureen Barry (Antrim)
RCB	2	Caitríona Higgins (Antrim)
FB	3	Claire Doherty (Antrim)
LCB	4	Grace McMullan (Antrim)
RWB	5	Jane Adams (Antrim)
CB	6	Patricia McEvoy (Armagh)
LWB	7	Olive McGowan (Armagh)
MF	8	Jennifer Braniff (Down)
MF	9	Donna Greeran (Down)
RWF	10	Pauline Green (Down)
CF	11	Majella Murray (Down)
LWF	12	Mary Black (Armagh)
RCF	13	Paula McAtamney (Derry)
FF	14	Claire McNicholl (Derry)
LCF	15	Veronica Curtin (Galway)

== Junior Final ==
Final

Ulster	1–10 – 2–6	Munster

Bohernabreena

Ulster	Munster

|}

Ulster:
GK	1	Aileen Crilly (Derry)
RCB	2	Susan McErlean (Derry)
FB	3	Gráinne Maguire (Derry)
LCB	4	Maureen Duffin (Antrim)
RWB	5	Cathy McDonald (Derry)
CB	6	Ciara McKinley (Antrim)
LWB	7	Siobhán Convery (Derry)
MF	8	Martina Mulholland (Derry)
MF	9	Aisling Kealey (Derry)
RWF	10	Shauna McCaul (Derry)
CF	11	Aileen Tohill (Derry)
LWF	12	Áine O'Kane (Derry)
RCF	13	Kerrie O'Neill (Antrim)
FF	14	Karen Rafferty (Derry)
LCF	15	Veronica Curtin (Galway)

Munster:
GK	1	Ger Casey (Cork)
RCB	2	Áine O'Connell (Limerick)
FB	3	Amanda Regan (Cork)
LCB	4	Christine O'Gorman (Cork)
RWB	5	Linda O'Connell (Cork)
CB	6	Helen Collins (Limerick)
LWB	7	Noelette O'Dwyer (Tipperary)
MF	8	Julie Delaney (Tipperary)
MF	9	Elaine Burke (Cork)
RWF	10	Mary Looby (Tipperary)
CF	11	Ciara Healy (Cork)
LWF	12	Eimear Dillon (Cork)
RCF	13	Jenny O'Leary (Cork)
FF	14	Joanne Ryan (Tipperary)
LCF	15	Rachel Maloney (Cork)

Preceded by Gael Linn Cup 1999	Gael Linn Cup; 1954 – present	Succeeded by Gael Linn Cup 2001
