= Gael Linn Cup 1973 =

Winners
- Champions: Connacht (1st title)

Runners-up
- Runners-up: Leinster
- Captain: Rita White

Other
- Matches played: 3

The 1973 Gael Linn Cup, the most important representative competition for elite level participants in the women's team field sport of camogie, was won by Connacht, who defeated Leinster in the final, played at Parnell Park.

== Arrangements ==
Leinster defeated Ulster 4–3 to 3–4 at Naas but it was Connacht's year, with their inaugural inter-provincial title. First they drew with Munster at Castleconnell 3–7 to 4–4 after 20 minutes of extra-time. An all Galway side defeated an all-Cork Munster team at Ballinasloe by five points, 1–6 to 1–1, in a match described in the Connacht Tribune as a "one of the best exhibitions of the game for many a year". Connacht won the Gael-Linn Cup for the first time at Parnell Park. Two goals from Margaret Murphy and further goals from Nina McHugh, Phil Foy and a point from Janet Murphy secured their victory in the final by 4–4 to 3–3, a spell midway through the second half when they scored two quick goals having put them seven points clear. Leinster had to field without their captain Liz Neary with Peggy Carey deputising on the wing and Rita White taking over as captain.

Agnes Hourigan, president of the Camogie Association, wrote in the Irish Press:

Connacht won well and their superiority would have been emphasised, especially in the first half, but for some fine saves by the Leinster goalkeeper Anna Carey from Dublin. When Liz Neary came on in the second half in an effort to save the day, she made little impact on a game within Connacht's grasp.

=== Final stages ===
4 November
Final

Connacht	4–4 – 3–3	Leinster

Parnell Park

Connacht	Leinster

|}

Connacht:
GK	1	Margaret Kileen (Galway)
FB	2	Mary Kilkenny(Galway)
RWB	3	Clare Collins(Galway)
CB	4	Kathleen Quinn(Galway)
LWB	5	Rosemare Divilly (Galway)
MF	6	Nina McHugh (Galway) (captain) (1–2)
MF	7	Jose Kelly (Galway)
MF	8	Catherine Ward (Galway)
RWF	9	Anne Donohoe (Galway)
CF	10	Phil Foy (Galway) (1–0)
LWF	11	Janet Murphy (Galway) (0–1)
FF	12	Margaret Murphy (Galway) (2–1)

|}

Leinster:
GK	1	Ann Carey(Dublin)
FB	2	Joanne Murphy (Wexford)
RWB	3	Rita Whyte (Dublin) (captain)
CB	4	Brigit Doyle (Wexford) (1–0)
LWB	5	Carmel O'Shea (Killkenny) (0–1)
MF	6	Elsie Walshe (Wexford)
MF	7	Margaret Leacy(Wexford) (1–0)
MF	8	Peggy Carey(Killkenny)
RWF	9	Helena O'Neill (Killkenny) (1–0)
CF	10	Marian Conroy (Dublin)
LWF	11	Orla Ní Síocháin(Dublin) (0–2)
FF	12	Angela Downey (Killkenny)

Preceded by Gael Linn Cup 1972	Gael Linn Cup; 1954 – present	Succeeded by Gael Linn Cup 1974
