= Gael Linn Cup 1969 =

Winners
- Champions: Leinster (9th title)

Runners-up
- Runners-up: Munster

Other
- Matches played: 3

The 1969 Gael Linn Cup, the most important representative competition for elite level participants in the women's team field sport of camogie, was won by Leinster, who defeated Munster in the final, played at Cahir, .

== Arrangements ==
Munster defeated Connacht 2–2 to 0–4 in the semifinal at Athenry on 4 October with goals by Ann Comerford and Beatrice Lawrence. Leinster defeated Ulster 7–5 to 1–4 at Croke Park. Leinster won the final by 5–4 to 2–2. Agnes Hourigan wrote in the Irish Press:

The winners won because they played as a team and passed out quickly to a team-mate when challenged and surrounded. Munster, who were also fine players, were a side of individuals and paid the price in lost chances.

=== Final stages ===
26 October
Final

Leinster	5–4 – 2–2	Munster

Cahir,

Leinster	Munster

|}

Leinster:
GK	1	Teresa Sheil (Wexford)
FB	2	Joan Murphy (Wexford)
RWB	3	Mary Ryan (Dublin)
CB	4	Margaret O'Leary (Wexford)
LWB	5	Ally Hussey (Dublin)
MF	6	Ann Carroll (Killkenny) (0–2)
MF	7	Kitty Murphy (Dublin)
MF	8	Orla Ní Síocháin (Dublin) (0–1)
RWF	9	Mary Doyle (Wexford) (1–0)
CF	10	Mary Walsh (Wexford) (1–0)
LWF	11	Judy Doyle (Dublin) (3–0)
FF	12	Una O'Connor (Dublin) (0–1)

Munster:
GK	1	Sally Long (Tipperary)
FB	2	Mel Cummins (Cork)
RWB	3	Josephine Marshall (Tipperary)
CB	4	Anne Graham (Tipperary)
LWB	5	Mary Jo Ryan (Cork)
MF	6	Liz Garvan (Cork) (0–1)
MF	7	Margaret Cleary (Tipperary)
MF	8	Anne Comerford (Cork) (captain)
RWF	9	Beatrice Lawrence (Tipperary)
CF	10	Carrie Clancy (Limerick)
LWF	11	Anne McAuliffe (Cork)
FF	12	Bridie Conroy (Tipperary) (2–1)

Preceded by Gael Linn Cup 1968	Gael Linn Cup; 1954 – present	Succeeded by Gael Linn Cup 1970
