= Gael Linn Cup 1979 =

Winners
- Champions: Leinster (14th title)

Runners-up
- Runners-up: Munster

Other
- Matches played: 3

The 1979 Gael Linn Cup, the most important representative competition for elite level participants in the women's team field sport of camogie, was won by Leinster, who defeated Munster in the final, played at Mobhi Road .

== Arrangements ==
Leinster defeated Ulster 4–6 to 0–1 at Russell Park, Blanchardstown. Munster defeated Connacht 4–8 to 0–2. Leinster defeated Munster 1–5 to 0–4 on a wet and cold day at Athboy., where the match was staged to celebrate the 75th anniversary of camogie.

=== Gael Linn Trophy ===
Munster defeated Connacht by one point in the trophy semi-final at Páirc Uí Chaoimh, Ulster defeated Leinster at Russell Park by 5–2 to 1–2. Ulster defeated Munster by 0–4 to 1–0 in the final.

=== Final stages ===
28 October
Final

Leinster	1–5 – 0–4	Munster

Mobhi Road

Leinster	Munster

|}

Leinster:
GK	1	Teresa O'Neill (Killkenny)
FB	2	Anne O'Brien (Dublin)
RWB	3	Ann Downey (Killkenny)
CB	4	Bridie Martin (Killkenny)
LWB	5	Deirdre Cousins (Wexford)
MF	6	Anna McManus (Dublin)
MF	7	Margaret Farrell (Killkenny)
MF	8	Barbara Redmond (Dublin)
RWF	9	Orla Ní Síocháin (Dublin)
CF	10	Angela Downey (Killkenny)
LWF	11	Dorothy Walsh (Wexford)
FF	12	Helena O'Neill ( (Killkenny)

Munster:
GK	1	Mary O'Brien (Tipperary)
FB	2	Claire Harrington (Clare)
RWB	3	Margie Neville (Limerick)
CB	4	Geraldine O'Brien (Limerick)
LWB	5	Maura Maher (Tipperary)
MF	6	Helen Mulcair (Limerick)
MF	7	Angela Higgins(Cork)
MF	8	Bernadette O'Brien (Limerick)
RWF	9	Nancy O'Driscoll (Cork)
CF	10	Deirdre Lane (Tipperary)
LWF	11	Siobhán McDonnell (Tipperary)
FF	12	Mary Geaney (Cork)

== Junior Final ==
Final

Ulster	0–4 – 1–0	Munster

Mobhi Road

Ulster	Munster

|}

Ulster:
GK	1	Teresa McDonnell (Monaghan)
FB	2	Margaret O'Prey (Down)
RWB	3	Margaret Moriarty (Armagh)
CB	4	Bernie O'Callaghan (Cavan)
LWB	5	Jane O'Loughlin (Tyrone)
MF	6	Ursula Jordan (Tyrone)
MF	7	Noleen Kiernan(Cavan)
MF	8	Bernie Hasson(Antrim)
RWF	9	Mary Ogle (Tyrone)
CF	10	Ann Jordan (Tyrone)
LWF	11	Noreen O'Prey (Down)
FF	12	Eileen Clarke (Cavan)

Munster:
GK	1	Patricia Fitzgibbon (Cork)
FB	2	Eileen Coffey(Clare)
RWB	3	Eileen Dineen(Cork)
CB	4	Betty Joyce (Cork)
LWB	5	Ann Gallery (Clare)
MF	6	Helen Clifford (Limerick)
MF	7	Clare Jones (Clare)
MF	8	Anne Delaney (Cork)
RWF	9	Eileen Kavanagh(Cork)
CF	10	Noelle O'Driscoll (Cork)
LWF	11	Geraldine McCarthy (Cork)
FF	12	Mary Lynch (Clare)

Preceded by Gael Linn Cup 1978	Gael Linn Cup; 1954 – present	Succeeded by Gael Linn Cup 1980
