= Gael Linn Cup 1985 =

Winners
- Champions: Leinster (18th title)

Runners-up
- Runners-up: Connacht

Other
- Matches played: 3

The 1985 Gael Linn Cup, the most important representative competition for elite level participants in the women's team field sport of camogie, was won by Leinster, who defeated Connacht in the final, played at Páirc Uí Chaoimh.

== Arrangements ==
Leinster defeated Ulster 5–10 to 0–1 in the semi-final and Munster by 4–9 to 1–6 in the final at Cork.

=== Gael Linn Trophy ===
In the trophy Munster defeated Connacht 1–10 to 1–7 victory over Connacht in the semi-final and defeated Ulster in the final 1–7 to 2–3 after a second-half comeback.

=== Final stages ===
20 October
Final

Leinster	4–9 – 0–5	Connacht

Páirc Uí Chaoimh

Leinster	Connacht

Leinster:
GK	1	Marie Fitzpatrick (Killkenny)
FB	2	Marian Conroy (Dublin)
RWB	3	Tina Fitzhenry (Wexford) (captain)
CB	4	Bridie McGarry (Killkenny)
LWB	5	Biddy O'Sullivan (Killkenny)
MF	6	Una Crowley (Dublin)
MF	7	Edel Murphy (Dublin)
MF	8	Anne Reddy (Wexford)
RWF	9	[Margaret Farrell (Killkenny)
CF	10	Catherine Murphy (Wexford)
LWF	11	Angela Downey (Killkenny)
FF	12	Joanne Gormley (Dublin)

Connacht

== Junior Final ==
Final

Munster	1–7 – 0–3	Ulster

Páirc Uí Chaoimh

Munster	Ulster

Munster:
GK	1	Fiona McCarthy (Cork)
FB	2	Margaret Guiry (Limerick) (captain)
RWB	3	Liz O'Grady (Limerick)
CB	4	Noleen Quinn (Clare)
LWB	5	Margaret Barry (Limerick)
MF	6	Mags Finn (Cork)
MF	7	Tina O'Connell (Clare)
MF	8	Maisie Clifford (Limerick)
RWF	9	Jean Paula Kent (Cork)
CF	10	Colette O'Mahon(Cork)
LWF	11	Maura McNicolas (Clare)
FF	12	Margo Cassidy (Limerick)

Ulster:
GK	1	Teresa McVeigh (Monaghan)
FB	2	Margaret Moriarty (Armagh)
RWB	3	Sheila Rafferty (Armagh)
CB	4	Sarah Anne Quinn (Derry)
LWB	5	Noeleen McKendry (Derry)
MF	6	Fionnuala O'Connor (Armagh)
MF	7	Ann Jordan (Tyrone)
MF	8	Catherine Daly (Tyrone)
RWF	9	Sally McCone (Armagh)
CF	10	Denise McStay (Armagh)
LWF	11	Pasty Quinn (Derry)
FF	12	Mary Donnelly (Armagh)

Preceded by Gael Linn Cup 1984	Gael Linn Cup; 1954 – present	Succeeded by Gael Linn Cup 1986
