= Gael Linn Cup 1986 =

Winners
- Champions: Leinster (19th title)

Runners-up
- Runners-up: Munster

Other
- Matches played: 3

The 1986 Gael Linn Cup, the most important representative competition for elite level participants in the women's team field sport of camogie, was won by Leinster, who defeated Munster in the final, played at Silver Park Kilmacud.

== Arrangements ==
Munster defeated Ulster by 5–10 to 0–1 in the semi-final at Kilmacud Crokes' ground in Glenalbyn. Goals from Angela Downey, Jo Dunne and Carmel O'Byrne gave Leinster a 4–6 to 1–6 victory over Munster in the final. Leinster defeated Munster by two points in the trophy semi-final and Kildare's Miriam Malone scored the winning goal five minutes from the end of the final to give them a one-point win over Munster.

=== Final stages ===
12 October
Final

Leinster	4–10 – 1–4	Munster

Silver Park Kilmacud

Leinster	Munster

|}

Leinster:
GK	1	Marie Fitzpatrick (Killkenny)
FB	2	Marion Conroy (Dublin)
RWB	3	Tina Fitzhenry (Wexford)
CB	4	Bridie McGarry (Killkenny)
LWB	5	Biddy O'Sullivan (Killkenny)
MF	6	Cathy Walsh (Dublin)
MF	7	Ann Downey (Killkenny)
MF	8	Clare Jones (Killkenny)
RWF	9	Jo Dunne (Killkenny)
CF	10	Carmel O'Byrne (Dublin)
LWF	11	Angela Downey (Killkenny)
FF	12	Breda Holmes (Killkenny)

Munster:
GK	1	Marian McCarthy (Cork)
FB	2	Eileen Dineen (Cork)
RWB	3	Mary Spillane (Cork)
CB	4	Helen Clifford (Limerick)
LWB	5	Mary Ring (Cork)
MF	6	Anne Gleeson (Tipperary)
MF	7	Val Fitzpatrick (Cork)
MF	8	Sandie Fitzgibbon (Cork)
RWF	9	Colette O'Mahony (Cork)
CF	10	Pauline McCarthy (Limerick)
LWF	11	Linda Mellerick (Cork)
FF	12	Anne Leahy (Cork)

== Junior Final ==
Final

Leinster	1–5 – 0–7	Munster

Silver Park Kilmacud

Leinster	Mun ster

|}

Leinster:
GK	1	Mary Doyle (Carlow)
FB	2	Geraldine Dwyer (Kildare)
RWB	3	Melanie Treacy (Kildare)
CB	4	Anna Dargan (Kildare)
LWB	5	Carmel Gray (Dublin)
MF	6	Esther Byrne (Wicklow)
MF	7	Kay Barry (Wicklow) (captain)
MF	8	Miriam Malone (Kildare)
RWF	9	Nuala Smithers (Carlow)
CF	10	Geraldine Dunne (Dublin)
LWF	11	Marianne Johnson (Kildare)
FF	12	Valerie Crean (Carlow)

Munster:
GK	1	Pauline O'Brien (Clare)
FB	2	Helen Cusack (Clare)
RWB	3	Patricia Rynne (Clare)
CB	4	Noeleen Quinn (Clare)
LWB	5	Niamh Coughlan (Cork)
MF	6	Karen Mellerick (Cork)
MF	7	Carmel Wall (Clare)
MF	8	Sheila O'Halloran (Clare)
RWF	9	Catherine O'Loughlin (Clare)
CF	10	Maura McNicolas (Clare)
LWF	11	Catherine Molloy (Clare)
FF	12	Paula Carey (Cork)

Preceded by Gael Linn Cup 1985	Gael Linn Cup; 1954 – present	Succeeded by Gael Linn Cup 1987
