= Doreen Brennan =

Irish camogie player

Personal information
- Native name: Dóirín Ní Bhraonáin (Irish)
- Born: Wexford, Ireland

Sport
- Sport: Camogie
Club*
| Years | Club | Apps (scores) |
| | Club | ? |
Inter-county**
| Years | County | Apps (scores) |
| 1957–60 | Dublin | ? |
- * club appearances and scores correct as of (16:31, 30 June 2010 (UTC)). **Inter County team apps and scores correct as of (16:31, 30 June 2010 (UTC)).

Doreen Brennan is a former camogie player who in 1960 became the first player in camogie history to captain her side to victory in both the All Ireland Camogie Championship and Gael Linn Cup for inter-provincial teams in the same year. She won four All Ireland senior medals in 1957, 1958, 1959 and 1960.

== Career ==
She starred in UCD's three Ashbourne Cup victories in a row of 1953 to 1955 and success in the Dublin camogie championship of 1955 and 1956, when she was captain. She was called up in 1957 for the Dublin team, who changed seven of their team after their shock 1956 semi-final defeat by Antrim. She retired from inter county camogie before the 1961 championship.

== Golf ==
Former holder of the club record score in Delgany County Wicklow, Doreen is also an accomplished golfer, her lowest handicap being 4.

== Family ==
Brennan was born in Davidstown, County Wexford into a family of 6 brothers and 3 sisters. Her sister Muriel Brennan was a renowned singer in her own right, once a lead with the Queensland Opera Company.
