= Gael Linn Cup 1996 =

Winners
- Champions: Munster (11th title)

Runners-up
- Runners-up: Ulster

Other
- Matches played: 3

The 1996 Gael Linn Cup, the most important representative competition for elite level participants in the women's team field sport of camogie, was won by Munster, who defeated Ulster in the final, played at Russell Park.

== Arrangements ==
Matches were played off over the weekend of 16 June at Russell Park. Maureen McAleenan scored 2–7 for Ulster and Denise Gilligan 2–6 for Connacht as Ulster beat Connacht 4–8 to 4–7 in the semi-final. Leinster suffered their worst-ever Gael-Linn Cup defeat, losing 3–16 to 0–to Munster.

== The Final ==
The final was a ten-goal thriller, and the only time in a major camogie competition when the losing team scored six goals. Ulster led Munster by eight points at half-time, Munster's second half come-back brought the match to extra time and Munster's fitness told as they won 4–18 to 6–10. Fiona O'Driscoll scored 2–10 for Munster and Maureen McAleenan 3–4 for Ulster.

=== Gael Linn Trophy ===
Ulster defeated Connacht, 3–12 to 1–3, Munster defeated Leinster by 4–13 to 2–7 and Munster completed the double with a 3–17 to 1–7 victory over Ulster.

=== Final stages ===
17 June
Final

Munster	4–18 – 6–10 after extra time	Ulster

<venue>

Munster	Ulster

|}

Munster:
GK	1	Cathleen Costine (Cork)
FB	2	Eithne Duggan (Cork)
RWB	3	Miriam Deasy (Cork)
CB	4	Mag Finn (Cork)
LWB	5	Triona Bonnar (Tipperary)
MF	6	Catherine O'Loughlin (Clare)
MF	7	Vivienne Harris (Cork)
MF	8	Denise Cronin (Cork) (captain)
RWF	9	Lyn Delea (Cork)
CF	10	Fiona O'Driscoll (Cork)
LWF	11	Ire O'Keeffe(Cork)
FF	12	Deirdre Hughes (Tipperary)

Ulster:
GK	1	Margaret McKee (Armagh)
FB	2	Martina Mulholland (Derry)
RWB	3	Edel Mason (Down)
CB	4	Pauline Green (Down)
LWB	5	Deidre Savage (Down)
MF	6	Geraldine Haughey (Armagh)
MF	7	Mary Black (Armagh) (captain)
MF	8	Leona Fay (Tyrone)
RWF	9	Brenie McBride (Armagh)
CF	10	Maureen McAleenan (Down)
LWF	11	Grace McMullan (Antrim)
FF	12	Colette Byrne (Armagh)

== Junior Final ==
Final

Munster	3–17 – 1–7	Ulster

<venue>

Munster	Ulster

|}

Munster:
GK	1	Breda O'Brien (Limerick)
FB	2	Niamh Bonnar (Tipperary)
RWB	3	Paula Bulfin (Tipperary)
CB	4	Claire Madden (Tipperary)
LWB	5	Anna Lenihan (Limerick)
MF	6	Hilda Kenneally (Cork)
MF	7	Mary O'Connor (Cork)
MF	8	Maeve Stoke (Tipperary)
RWF	9	Noelle Kennedy (Tipperary)
CF	10	Helen Kiely (Tipperary)
LWF	11	Pauline McCarthy (Limerick)
FF	12	Vera Sheehan (Limerick)

Ulster:
GK	1	Fiona Daly (Tyrone)
FB	2	Donna Greeran (Down)
RWB	3	Paula Daly (Fermanagh)
CB	4	Cathy Mulholland (Down)
LWB	5	Mary Rose McGrady (Tyrone)
MF	6	Ellen O'Neill (Derry)
MF	7	Denise Boyle (Antrim)
MF	8	Ita Brady (Cavan)
RWF	9	Michelle Corry (Fermanagh)
CF	10	Mary O'Kane (Derry)
LWF	11	Sinéad McGovern (Down)
FF	12	Elaine Dowds (Antrim)

Preceded by Gael Linn Cup1996	Gael Linn Cup; 1954 – present	Succeeded by Gael Linn Cup 1996
