= Lynn Dunlea =

Camogie player

Personal information
- Native name: Linn Ní Dhuinnshlé (Irish)
- Born: 1974 (age 51–52) County Cork, Ireland

Sport
- Sport: Camogie
Clubs*
Years	Club	Apps (scores)
	Cloughduv and Glen Rovers	?
Inter-county**
Years	County	Apps (scores)
1990-2001	Cork	?
- * club appearances and scores correct as of (16:31, 30 June 2010 (UTC)). **Inter County team apps and scores correct as of (16:31, 30 June 2010 (UTC)).

Lynn Dunlea is a former camogie player, scorer of three goals for Cork in their 1993 All Ireland final victory over Galway.

== Famous goal ==
She scored a breath-taking goal deep in injury-time during the All-Ireland semi-final against Kilkenny earlier that season.

== Career ==
She won four All Ireland senior medals in 1992, 1993, 1997 and 1998. She won an All Ireland Club Championship medal with the Glen Rovers club in 1993, and seven National League medals.

For her club she scored 4-5 of their total of 6-12 in the 1993 club final and 0-14 of Glen Rovers 1-15 in their unsuccessful 1994 All Ireland club final against Lisdowney at Ballyragget,

== Football ==
She won a women's football club title with Donoughmore in 2001.

== Injury and retirement ==
She retired at the age of 28 after suffering shoulder and neck injuries in the drawn All Ireland semi-final of 2001. Having played in the first All Ireland final to be televised live she was a television analyst for RTÉ camogie coverage in the 2000s.
