= Deirdre Sutton =

Irish camogie player

Personal information
- Native name: Deirdre de Sutún (Irish)
- Nickname: Dee Dee
- Born: Cork, Ireland

Sport
- Sport: Camogie
- Position: goalkeeper
Club*
Years	Club	Apps (scores)
	Glen Rovers	?
Inter-county**
Years	County	Apps (scores)
	Cork	?
- * club appearances and scores correct as of (16:31, 30 June 2010 (UTC)). **Inter County team apps and scores correct as of (16:31, 30 June 2010 (UTC)).

Deirdre Sutton is a former camogie player, winner of the Cuchulainn all star award in 1963, the first major national award instituted in the Irish field sport for women of camogie.

== Career ==
She was the outstanding personality on Cork's Munster championship winning team of 1963 and played on Munster teams that won the Gael Linn Cup inter provincial series in 1963 and 1964. She also appeared for Glen Rovers in two All Ireland Senior Club Championship semi-finals: in 1964 against Celtic and in 1967 against Eoghan Rua.

== Return ==
Having regraded to junior in 1971, she returned to win two All-Ireland Senior Camogie Championship medals as goalkeeper in 1972 and 1973, as well as playing in the finals of 1974 and 1975. She played for Glen Rovers in the Cork county final of 1983.
