= Vera Mackey =

Irish camogie player

Personal information
- Native name: Fíora Ní Mhaca (Irish)
- Born: Limerick, Ireland

Sport
- Sport: Camogie
Club*
Years	Club	Apps (scores)
	Ahane	?
Inter-county**
Years	County	Apps (scores)
	Limerick	?
- * club appearances and scores correct as of (16:31, 30 June 2010 (UTC)). **Inter County team apps and scores correct as of (16:31, 30 June 2010 (UTC)).

Vera Mackey is a former camogie player, an All Ireland finalist in 1980.

== Career ==
The daughter of hurler John Mackey she played in two All Ireland club finals with Ahane. She won an All Ireland junior medal and two Gael Linn Cup inter provincial medals with Munster.
