= Gael Linn Cup =

Biennial inter-provincial camogie competition in Ireland

Inter-provincial Camogie Championship
- Irish: Craobh Idir-Chúigí Camógaíochta na hÉireann
- Founded: 1956
- Trophy: Gael Linn Cup
- No. of teams: 4
- Title holders: Leinster (26th title)
- First winner: Leinster
- Most titles: Leinster (26 titles)

The Gael Linn Cup is a biennial tournament, representative competition for elite level participants in the women's team field sport of camogie, contested by Ireland's four provincial teams with competitions at senior and junior level on alternate years. The tournament has existed in various guides since 1956, currently the senior tournament is played in even years and the junior tournament in odd years. An inter-provincial colleges competition is also played at secondary school/high school level.

== Table of winners ==
Click on the year for details and team line-outs.

County	Wins	Years won
Leinster	26	1956, 1957, 1958, 1959, 1960, 1962, 1965, 1968, 1969, 1970, 1971, 1972, 1978, 1979, 1981, 1983, 1984, 1985, 1986, 1987, 1988, 1989, 1991, 1993, 2006, 2010, 2011
Munster	20	1961, 1963, 1964, 1966, 1980, 1982, 1990, 1992, 1994, 1995, 1996, 1997, 1998, 1999, 2001, 2002, 2003, 2004, 2005, 2009
Connacht	4	1973, 1974, 2000 and 2008
Ulster	2	1967, 2007

== History ==
Inter-provincial camogie matches were played as part of the 1928 and 1932 Tailteann Games programmes and a further inter-provincial match was played in July 1954 in Navan as part of the 50th anniversary celebrations of the Camogie Association. Munster beat Ulster by 8–3 to 5–3 in a match that was described as the best of the year.

The enthusiasm generated by the match at Navan led to the establishment of an annual inter-provincial competition two years later, with the first final being contested by Leinster and by Ulster at Knockbridge, County Louth. Leinster has dominated the series, having won 26 titles, followed by Munster with 20 titles. Connacht has won four titles (in 1973, 1974, 2000 and 2008), while Ulster has won two titles (in 1967 and 2007).

== Experiments ==
In 1993 and 1994, the Gael Linn Cups were played with teams of 15-a-side for a two-year experimental period, as a prelude to the increase in team size from 12 to 15 in 1999 for all matches.

== Two competitions ==
The series was played as a junior competition between 1974 and 1976. Senior and junior competitions were run concurrently from 1977. The competition format was moved to a single weekend in October/November during 1985–88 and, again, since 1999. The date was moved to June in 1995, back to October/November in 2004 and to May since 2008. As with the Railway Cups in Gaelic Football and Hurling, the competition has been popular with players, but has survived several attempts to abolish the series since 1986.

Shwarzkopf hair products sponsored the competition from 1999 to 2004. In 2009, after the withdrawal of Ulster, the series was played in a blitz format with 30 minute games.

In 2010, it was decided to alternate the competition between junior and senior status, and the senior competition was restored to full match status, with four provinces contesting the semi-finals. In the absence of Antrim players, an all Derry side represented Ulster in the 2010 semi-final.

== Players ==
Many players won Gael Linn Cup medals without ever winning All-Ireland titles, affording them valuable recognition in the days before the Camogie All Stars Awards were inaugurated. Geraldine Callinan (two Gael Linn Interprovincial Medals) Geraldine Callinan was the youngest ever Leinster player at 14 years of age. Scored three goals and was instrumental in winning the match after being eleven points behind at half time.

== Highlights and incidents ==
- Clare player Patricia O'Grady's solo performance in the 1990 final when she scored 9–1 against Ulster at Ballyholland, one of the outstanding scoring exhibitions, not just in the competition but in the history of the game.
- Among the first camogie matches to be filmed for television packages were two Gael Linn Cup semi-finals at Casement Park, Belfast in 1959 and Carrickmacross in 1963.
- Joan Gormley's last-minute goal for Leinster against Munster in the 1983 final at Ballinlough.
- The 1996 final which produced ten goals, an amazing Munster comeback from eight points down to force the match into extra time and went on to win by 4–18 to 6–10.
- The 1997 final in which Leinster were in front by four points with ten minutes to go, for the second successive year Munster came back to equalise and scored 3–7 in extra-time to take the trophy.
- The 7-38 scored by Munster against Leinster in the 1999 semi-final, the highest scoreline in the history of the tournament.
- The dramatic finale to the 2006 final when two late points snatched victory for Leinster against Munster.

== Gael Linn Cup Senior Inter-Provincial Finals ==
The first figure is the number of goals scored (equal to 3 points each) and the second total is the number of points scored, the figures are combined to determine the winner of a match in Gaelic games.

== Gael Linn Cup Finals ==
Click on the year for details and team lineouts.

- 1956 Leinster 7-01 Ulster 3-01 Knockbridge
- 1957 Leinster 5-01 Munster 3-01 Cahir
- 1958 Leinster 5-02 Ulster 3-03 Parnell Park
- 1959 Leinster 6-00 Ulster 1-03 Casement Park
- 1960 Leinster 4-06 Munster 3-01 Cahir
- 1961 Munster 5-02 Connacht 1-00 Pearse Stadium
- 1962 Leinster 7-02 Ulster 5-09 Casement Park
- 1963 Munster 3-02 Leinster 2-02 Gorey
- 1964 Munster 2-08 Leinster 3-02 Cahir
- 1965 Leinster 4-03 Ulster 4-01 Casement Park
- 1966 Munster 4-02 Leinster 1-03 Carrickmacross
- 1967 Ulster 5-04 Leinster 5-01 Parnell Park
- 1968 Leinster 7-00 Ulster 2-05 Croke Park
- 1969 Leinster 5-04 Munster 2-02 Cahir
- 1970 Leinster 12-02 Ulster 4-01 Carrickmacross
- 1971 Leinster 6-04 Ulster 0-05 Parnell Park
- 1972 Leinster 7-07 Connacht 4-02 (Sligo)
- 1973 Connacht 4-04 Leinster 3-03 Parnell Park
- 1974 Connacht 3-07 Munster 3-00 Ballinasloe
- 1975-7 Played at junior level only
- 1978 Leinster 4-08 Connacht 2-02 Mobhi Road
- 1979 Leinster 1-05 Munster 0-04 Athboy
- 1980 Munster 2-05 Leinster 2-01 St John's Park
- 1981 Leinster 3-10 Ulster 2-04 Russell Park
- 1982 Munster 3-10 Leinster 2-12 Mobhi Road
- 1983 Leinster 2-07 Munster 1-07 Ballinlough
- 1984 Leinster 3-09 Connacht 1-04 Silver Park Kilmacud
- 1985 Leinster 4-09 Leinster 0-05 Páirc Uí Chaoimh
- 1986 Leinster 4-10 Connacht 1-04 Silver Park Kilmacud
- 1987 Leinster 8-11 Connacht 0-05 Silver Park Kilmacud
- 1988 Leinster 2-09 Connacht 2-04 Silver Park Kilmacud
- 1989 Leinster 5-12 Munster 3-06 Silver Park Kilmacud
- 1990 Munster 10-10 Ulster 1-02 Ballyholland
- 1991 Leinster 5-12 Munster 0-07 O'Toole Park
- 1992 Munster 1-18 Leinster 2-09 O'Toole Park
- 1993 Leinster 6-14 Ulster 1-04 Clane
- 1994 Munster 4-11 Ulster 2-07 Silver Park Kilmacud
- 1995 Munster 4-13 Connacht 3-10 Russell Park
- 1996 Munster 4-18 Ulster 6-10 (extra time) Russell Park
- 1997 Munster 5-15 Leinster 1-14 (extra time) Russell Park
- 1998 Munster 6-20 Leinster 1-11 St Vincents
- 1999 Munster 1-18 Connacht 1-09 Bohernabreena
- 2000 Connacht 1-10 Ulster 0-03 Bohernabreena
- 2001 Munster 1-18 Connacht 1-08 Bohernabreena
- 2002 Munster 7-23 Ulster 0-11 Bohernabreena
- 2003 Munster 3-13 Ulster 1-09 Portmarnock
- 2004 Munster 1-16 Connacht 1-09 Kilmacud
- 2005 Munster 3-14 Connacht 2-8 Ballinteer
- 2006 Leinster 2-07 Munster 1-08 Navan
- 2007 Ulster 2-12 Leinster 3-08 Russell Park
- 2008 Connacht 1-14 Munster 2-10 Ashbourne
- 2009 Munster 0-07 Connacht 0-02 Ashbourne
- 2010 Leinster 3-17 Munster 1-14 Trim.
- 2012
- 2013
- 2014
- 2015

== Gael Linn Trophy ==
Click on the year for details and team lineouts.

County	Wins	Years won
Munster	17	1975, 1977, 1978, 1980, 1983, 1985, 1987, 1988, 1992, 1994, 1996, 1997, 2003, 2004, 2005, 2008, 2011
Ulster	8	1979, 1989, 1990, 1991, 1993, 1998, 2000 and 2002
Leinster	7	1976, 1982, 1984, 1986, 1999, 2001 2007
Connacht	4	1981, 1995, 2006 and 2009

== Gael Linn Trophy Finals ==
- 1975 Munster 5–1 Ulster 2–0 Adare
- 1976 Leinster 2–6 Munster 2–3 Adare
- 1977 Munster 3–7 Connacht 3–1 Adare
- 1978 Munster 2–2 Ulster 2–1 Mobhi Road
- 1979 Ulster 0–4 Munster 1–0 Mobhi Road
- 1980 Munster 1–9 Leinster 3–2 St John's Park
- 1981 Connacht 2–3 Munster 2–2 Russell Park
- 1982 Leinster 3–16 Connacht 2–8 Mobhi Road
- 1983 Munster 1–12 Leinster 1–11 Ballinlough
- 1984 Leinster 3–6 Ulster 1–3 Silver Park Kilmacud
- 1985 Munster 1–7 Ulster 2–3 Páirc Uí Chaoimh
- 1986 Leinster 5–6 Connacht 4–3 Silver Park Kilmacud
- 1987 Munster 2–6 Ulster 2–5 Silver Park Kilmacud
- 1988 Munster 4–3 Leinster 3–5 Silver Park Kilmacud
- 1989 Ulster 1–11 Leinster 2–3 Silver Park Kilmacud
- 1990 Ulster 5–11 Munster 5–3 Ballyholland
- 1991 Ulster 4–5 Munster 0–6 O'Toole Park
- 1992 Munster 6–11 Connacht 3–3 O'Toole Park
- 1993 Ulster 4–5 Leinster 1–9 Clane
- 1994 Munster 5–9 Ulster 2–12 Silver Park Kilmacud
- 1995 Connacht 1–9 Munster 0–10 Russell Park
- 1996 Munster 3–17 Ulster 1–7 Russell Park
- 1997 Munster 3–11 Leinster 2–10 Russell Park
- 1998 Ulster 3–12 Leinster 1–12 St Vincents
- 1999 Leinster 3–17 Connacht 4–6 Bohernabreena
- 2000 Ulster 1–10 Munster 2–6 Bohernabreena
- 2001 Leinster 1–14 Munster 1–11 Bohernabreena
- 2002 Ulster 4–11 Leinster 1–13 Bohernabreena
- 2003 Munster 4–7 Ulster 0–5 Portmarnock
- 2004 Munster 4–16 Leinster 1–4 Silver Park Kilmacud
- 2005 Munster 2–14 Ulster 2–4 Ballinteer
- 2006 Connacht 3–12 Ulster 1–17 Navan
- 2007 Leinster 3–16 Munster 0–11 Russell Park
- 2008 Munster 3–17 Ulster 0–3 Ashbourne
- 2009 Connacht 4–4 Munster 2–2
- 2011 Munster 1–15 Leinster 2–11 St Jude's

== Leinster ==
Leinster won the first five competitions, have won five in a row and seven-in-a-row since then, and have fielded players from nine of the province's 12 counties on victorious teams.

- The first winning Leinster team:

Kathleen Woods (Louth), May Kavanagh (Wicklow), Claire Monaghan (Kildare), Ettie Kearns (Meath), May Kavanagh (Dublin), Lily Parle (Wexford), Annette Corrigan (Dublin), Kathleen Mills (Dublin), Fran Maher (Dublin), Mary O'Sullivan (Dublin), Una O'Connor (Dublin), Kay Douglas (Wicklow), Subs: Kathleen Duffy (Louth), Madge Quigley (Louth), Brigid Judge (Kildare).

== Munster ==
Munster won their first competition on a sodden field at Salthill in 1961, in the year Connacht surprisingly inflicted Leinster's first defeat in the competition.

- Honor Flynn (Tipperary), Josie McNamara (Waterford), Joan Clancy (Cork), Pat Doyle (Waterford), Bridie Scully (Tipperary), Kathleen Griffin (Tipperary, captain), Lil Coughlan (Cork), Tess Moloney (Tipperary), Kathleen Downes (Tipperary), Eithne Neville (Limerick).

== Ulster ==
Maeve Gilroy was the star in Ulster's first success in the 1967 at Parnell Park, achieved with ten players from Antrim and two from Down.

- The team was: Teresa Cassidy (Antrim), Moya Forde (Antrim), Moira Caldwell (Down), Maeve Gilroy (Antrim, captain), Kathleen Kelly (Antrim), Mairéad McAtamney (Antrim), Sue Cashman (Antrim), Pat Craigie (Down), Marion McFettridge (Antrim), Mairéad Quinn (Antrim), Eileen Collins (Antrim), Lily Scullion (Antrim).

== Connacht ==
Connacht's breakthrough victory came in 1973, when an all Galway side defeated an all-Cork Munster side 1–6 to 1–1 in a replayed semi-final described in the Connacht Tribune as “one of the best exhibitions of the game for many a year” and then beat Leinster in the final by a single point at Parnell Park, Dublin.

- The winning team was: Margaret Killeen, Mary Kilkenny, Claire Collins, Kathleen Quinn, Rosemary Divilly, Nono McHugh, Josie Kelly, Catherine Ward, Ann Donohue, Phil Foye, Jane Murphy, Margaret Murphy.

== Team for 1954 revival ==
The teams for the 1954 revival match at Navan were:

Leinster	Ulster

LEINSTER:
GK	1	Eileen Duffy (Dublin)
FB	2	May Kavanagh (Dublin)
RWB	3	Ettie Kearns (Meath)
CB	4	Sheila Donnelly (Dublin)
LWB	5	Aggie Kavanagh (Wicklow)
MF	6	Aileen Kearns (Meath)
MF	7	Annette Corrigan (Dublin) (0-1)
MF	8	Kathleen Mills (Dublin) (2-1)
RWF	9	Una O'Connor (Dublin) (3-0)
CF	10	Sheila Sleator (Dublin)
LWF	11	Eileen Bourke (Dublin) (2-0)
FF	12	Kay Douglas (Wicklow) (1-1).

ULSTER:
GK	1	Bernie Kelly (Down)
FB	2	Moya Forde (Antrim)
RWB	3	Teresa Halferty (Derry)
CB	4	Carrie Rankin (Derry)
LWB	5	Bernadette King (Armagh)
MF	6	Maeve Gilroy (Antrim) (1-0)
MF	7	Nancy Danagher (Cavan)
MF	8	Ita O'Reilly (Antrim) (1-0)
RWF	9	Patsy McCloskey (Derry) (2-1)
CF	10	Deirdre O'Gorman (Antrim) (1-1)
LWF	11	Chris Hughes (Antrim)
FF	12	Patsy O'Brien (Derry) (0-1).

== See also ==
- Interprovincial Championship
- All-Ireland Senior Camogie Championship
