= Maeve Gilroy =

Camogie player

Personal information
- Native name: Meadhbh Níc Giolla Ruaidh (Irish)
- Born: Antrim, Northern Ireland

Sport
- Sport: Camogie
- Position: forward, centre back
Club*
Years	Club	Apps (scores)
	St Malachy's	?
Inter-county**
Years	County	Apps (scores)
	Antrim	?
Inter-county titles
- All-Irelands: 2
- * club appearances and scores correct as of (16:31, 30 June 2010 (UTC)). **Inter County team apps and scores correct as of (16:31, 30 June 2010 (UTC)).

Maeve Gilroy is a former camogie player, winner of the Cuchulainn award in 1966 and of All Ireland medals in 1956 and 1967.

== Career ==
Gilroy was already regarded as one of the country's best players when she scored two goals for Antrim against Dublin in the historic 1956 All Ireland semi-final, a match that prevented Dublin winning 19 All Ireland titles in a row. She was goalscorer and lead forward on the first ever Queen's University Belfast team to defeat UCD, by a score of 3–1 to 3–0 in the Ashbourne Cup of 1959, but the cup went to UCD at the end of the round-robin series. When the competition reverted to knock-out in 1961, she was on the QUB team that beat UCC 7–2 to 2–1 at Cherryvale in the Ashbourne Cup semi-final, alongside Margaret Treacy, Eileen Maguire and Maire O’Kane.

Playing in defence through the second half of her career, she was playmaker for the team that defeated Dublin in a 1967 replay and for the Ulster team that won their first Gael Linn Cup in 1967. She continued to play until Antrim's defeat in the All Ireland final of 1969.

== Coach and referee ==
She coached the Queens' University Ashbourne Cup teams in the 1960s and refereed matches up to All Ireland level, taking charge of the All Ireland finals of 1961 and 1962.
