= List of Cork senior camogie team captains =

List of Cork senior camogie team captains features camogie players who have captained Cork in All-Ireland Senior Camogie Championship finals and National Camogie League finals.

== List of Captains ==
Year	Player	Club	All-Ireland	League
1934	Kathleen Delea ^{(Note 1)}	Blackrock	Winners	
1935	Josie McGrath	Old Aloysius	Winners	
1936	Kathleen Cotter	Mayfield	Winners	
1938	Kathleen Coughlan		Runners Up	
1939	Renee Fitzgerald	Old Aloysius	Winners	
1940	Lil Kirby	Old Aloysius	Winners	
1941	Kathleen Buckley	Old Aloysius	Winners	
1942	Peggy Hogg	Old Aloysius	Runners Up	
1943	Kathleen Coughlan		Runners Up	
1955	Anna Crotty		Runners Up	
1956	Lil Coughlan		Runners Up	
1968	Anna Crotty		Runners Up	
1970	Ann Comerford	Watergrasshill	Winners	
1971	Betty Sugrue	South Presentation	Winners	
1972	Hannah Dineen	South Presentation	Winners	
1973	Marie Costine	Cloyne	Winners	
1974	Marion Sweeney	Killeagh	Runners Up	
1975	Mary O'Leary	Watergrasshill	Runners Up	
1978	Nancy O'Driscoll	Éire Óg	Winners	
1980	Mary Geaney ^{(Note 2)}	Éire Óg	Winners	
1981	Clare Cronin	Old Aloysius	Runners Up	Runners Up
1982	Pat Lenihan	Killeagh	Winners	Runners Up
1983	Cathy Landers	Killeagh	Winners	
1986	Marian McCarthy	Éire Óg		Winners
1987	Val Fitzpatrick		Runners Up	
1988	Linda Mellerick	Glen Rovers	Runners Up	
1989	Betty Joyce	Killeagh	Runners Up	Runners Up
1991	Therése O'Callaghan	Glen Rovers	Runners Up	Winners
1992	Sandie Fitzgibbon	Glen Rovers	Winners	Winners
1993	Linda Mellerick	Glen Rovers	Winners	Runners Up
1995	Denise Cronin	Glen Rovers	Winners	Winners
1996	Therése O'Callaghan	Glen Rovers	Runners Up	Winners
1997	Linda Mellerick	Glen Rovers	Winners	Winners
1998	Eithne Duggan	Bishopstown	Winners	Winners
1999	Vivienne Harris	Bishopstown		Winners
2000	Vivienne Harris	Bishopstown	Runners Up	Winners
2001	Vivienne Harris	Bishopstown		Winners
2002	Úna O'Donoghue	Cloughduv	Winners	
2003	Stephanie Delea ^{(Note 1)}	Cloughduv	Runners Up	Winners
2004	Stephanie Delea	Cloughduv	Runners Up	
2005				Runners Up
2005	Elaine Burke	Valley Rovers	Winners	
2006	Joanne Callaghan	Cloughduv	Winners	Winners
2007	Gemma O'Connor	St Finbarr's	Runners Up	Winners
2008	Cathriona Foley	Rockbán	Winners	
2009	Amanda Regan	Douglas	Winners	
2012	Julia White		Runners Up	Winners
2013	Anna Geary	Milford		Winners
2014	Anna Geary	Milford	Winners	
2015	Ashling Thompson	Milford	Winners	Runners Up
2016	Ashling Thompson	Milford	Runners Up	
2017	Rena Buckley ^{(Note 3)}	Inniscarra	Winners	Runners Up
2018	Aoife Murray	Cloughduv	Winners	Runners Up
2021				Runners=Up
2022	Amy Lee	Na Piarsaigh	Runners-Up	Runners-Up
2023	Amy O'Connor	St Vincent's	Winners	Runners-Up
2024			Winners	
2025			Runners-Up	Winners
2026	Meabh Cahalane	St. Finbarr's		

== Notes ==
- ^1 1934 captain, Kathleen Delea, is the great-aunt of 2003–04 captain, Stephanie Delea.
- ^2 Mary Geaney became the first player to captain a team to both the All-Ireland Senior Ladies' Football Championship and the All-Ireland Senior Camogie Championship. In 1976 she captained Kerry when they won the All-Ireland Senior Ladies' Football Championship. In 1980 she captained the Cork senior camogie team.
- ^3 Rena Buckley was the first player to captain Cork teams to both the All-Ireland Senior Ladies' Football Championship and the All-Ireland Senior Camogie Championship. In 2012 she captained the Cork senior ladies' football team. In 2017 she captained the Cork senior camogie team.
