= Camogie in County Cork =

Camogie in County Cork is administered by the Cork County Board of the Camogie Association.

== Clubs ==
The premier club competition in the county is the Cork Senior Camogie Championship.

Glen Rovers (4) Killeagh (1980) and Milford (3) 2013, 2014 and 2015 have won the All Ireland senior club championship.

Cork lead the way with the most Camogie Clubs in any County (70), their Club Championships are sponsored by Se Systems.

St. Finbarr's were crowned Cork Senior Camogie Championship winners after defeating St Catherine's by 0-15 to 0-09 in the MTU on October 12 to gain back to back titles!

The Barrs had an epic Munster Campaign securing the title. They went on to contest the All Ireland final losing out to Athenry of Galway in the replay.

Many of the 2025 Cork county players did well out of the Club Championships. In 2026, the Senior Captain Meábh Cahalane won the Senior Championship with St Finbarrs.

The Premier Intermediate title was won by Ballincollig over [[Ballygarvan GAA]|Ballygarvan]] after a replay on a scoreline of 0-14 to 0-10. The first day out was a tight and intense affair as both sides were not long down from the Senior grade. Ballincollig, however, came back as a much stronger team. Linda Dorgan (0-6) and Centre back Leah Weste stood tall while off the bench at half time Cork U16 Captain Leah Hannigan struck 0-5. Ballygarvan were missing their key player, Izzy O’Regan, who tore her ACL in a league game with Cork earlier in that year. The Intermediate title was won by Ballinacarthy who beat Sliabh Rua in their final. This was the second title in a row for the West Cork outfit. It was also two county final losses for Sliabh Rua, however. Captain Moira Barrett led by example as she hit 2-4 from play.

Premier Intermediate Champs Ballincollig won the Munster Championship also, and made it all the way to the All Ireland final before a four point defeat against Camross of Laois.

The Premier Junior title was won by East Cork side Aghada on a scoreline of 3-12 to 2-11 against a Bishopstown side who were debutants in this grade following the previous year’s success.

Youghal won the [year] [Cork Junior A Hurling/Football] Championship, defeating Blarney in the final [score, e.g. 1–14 to 0–12]. The match was played in wet and windy conditions.

Junior B winners were Barryroe as they played off in a West Cork derby against Kilmeen & Kilbree GAA goals proved the difference in that game.

The Junior C title went to Castlemartyr after they won over the favorites from Macroom side Laochra Óg. Laochra Óg are another side to lose 2 in a row.

In the Second and Third team competitions Éire Óg Face off against St Finbarr's in the Barry O’Sullivan (Junior B2) Championship.

The Lillie O’Sullivan Competition was won by Ballinora after beating Glen Rovers with a strong performance.

In the Lily Grant Championship it was a win for Aghabullogue’s 3rd team as they proved too strong for Midleton.

The SE Systems Minor Championships are ongoing as teams across all 4 grades are battling hard.

All finals took/will take place between September and November at the Cork Camogie Grounds in Castle Road (Blackrock/Mahon)

St Finbarrs will be the reiging Senior League Champions who won the title in both 2024 and 2025.

== County teams ==
The Cork senior camogie team represents Cork in the National Camogie League and the All-Ireland Senior Camogie Championship. There are also under-23, minor and u16 teams.

The Cork county camogie team have won the All-Ireland Senior Camogie Championship on 31 occasions. These include wins in 1934, 1935, 1936, 1939, 1940, 1941, 1970, 1971, 1972, 1973, 1978, 1980, 1982, 1983, 1992, 1993, 1995, 1997, 1998, 2002, 2005, 2006, 2008, 2009, 2014, 2015, 2017, 2018, 2023, 2024 and 2026.

Cork have also won the National Camogie League on 17 occasions. These include the 1984, 1986, 1991, 1992, 1995, 1996, 1997, 1998, 1999, 2000, 2001, 2003, 2007, 2008, 2012, 2013 and 2025 league competitions.

== People ==
Several people from County Cork, including Síle Horgan, Lil Kirby, Mary Moran, Mary O'Callaghan, Joan O'Flynn and Lil O'Grady, were all presidents of the national Camogie Association.

Among the All-Ireland SCC winning captains for Cork were Rena Buckley (2017 All-Ireland SCC-winning captain), Elaine Burke (2005 All-Ireland SCC-winning captain), Ann Comerford (1970 All-Ireland SCC-winning captain), Kathleen Cotter (1936 All-Ireland SCC-winning captain), Denise Cronin (1995 All-Ireland SCC-winning captain), Kathleen Delea (1936 All-Ireland SCC-winning captain), Eithne Duggan (1998 All-Ireland SCC-winning captain), Renee Fitzgerald (1939 All-Ireland SCC-winning captain), Cathriona Foley (2008 All-Ireland SCC-winning captain), Anna Geary (2014 All-Ireland SCC-winning captain), Cathy Landers (1983 All-Ireland SCC-winning captain), Pat Lenihan (1982 All-Ireland SCC-winning captain), Josie McGrath (1935 All-Ireland SCC-winning captain), Nancy O'Driscoll (1978 All-Ireland SCC-winning captain), and Betty Sugrue (1971 All-Ireland SCC-winning captain).

Four Cork players, Marie Costine, Sandie Fitzgibbon, Linda Mellerick and Pat Moloney, were named on the team of the century.

As of Today, Ashling Thompson, Amy O’Connor, Katrina and Pamela Mackey, Laura Treacy, 2024 player of the year Laura Hayes, as well as three in a row nominated player of the year Saoirse McCarthy lead the way as Corks top players.

Under Camogie's National Development Plan 2010-2015, "Our Game, Our Passion", five new camogie clubs were to be established in the county by 2015.
