= 2007 National Camogie League =

Camogie tournament

National Camogie League 2007
Winners
- Champions: Cork (14th title)
- Captain: Gemma O'Connor

Runners-up
- Runners-up: Wexford

The 2007 National Camogie League is a competition in the women's team field sport of camogie was won by Cork, who defeated Wexford in the final, played at Nowlan Park.

== The Final ==
A late Jennifer O'Leary pointed free brought the title to Cork. Wexford started strongly to hold a 0-8 to 0-3 half time lead thanks to good work in the midfield sector from Kate Kelly and Caroline Murphy, but Cork came back resolutely in the second half.

Maire Ni Scollai reported in the Irish Independent:

A spectacular goal-scoring spree from both sides between the 48th and 58th minutes ensured that the crowd were on the edge of their seats throughout.irish Independent May 7 2007

Goals from Jennifer O'Leary, Una O'Donoghue and Sile Burns within five minutes gave Cork a 3–6 to 0–9 lead with seven minutes to go, but two goals from Wexford full-forward Michelle Hearn meant the sides were level as the game headed for injury-time and O'Leary's late winner.

Wexford defeated Cork by 4-12 to 0-14 in the opening round of the championship six days later Rebels routed as Wexford hit back with a vengeance and went on to reverse the result in the All-Ireland final a few months later.

== Division 2 ==
The Division 2 final, known until 2005 as the National Junior League, was won by Limerick who defeated Cork intermediates in the final. The Division 3 final was won by Waterford who defeated Down by two points in the final.

=== Final stages ===
May 6
Final

Cork	3-8 – 2-10	Wexford

Nowlan Park

Cork	Wexford

Cork:
GK	1	Aoife Murray (Cloughduv) (substituted off) 42' (substituted on) 46'
RCB	2	Joanne Callaghan (Cloughduv)
FB	3	Rosarie Holland (Barryroe)
LCB	4	Amanda Regan (Douglas)
RWB	5	Rena Buckley (Inniscarra)
CB	6	Mary O'Connor (Killeagh)
LWB	7	Sara Hayes (Courcey Rovers_GAA)
MF	8	Briege Corkery (Cloughduv) (substituted off) 56'
MF	9	Gemma O'Connor (St Finbarr's) (Captain) 0-2
RWF	10	Orla Cotter (St Catherine’s)
CF	11	Anna Geary (Milford) 0-1
LWF	12	Jennifer O'Leary (Barryroe) 1-4
RCF	13	Angela Walsh (Killeagh)
FF	14	Una O'Donoghue (Cloughduv) 1-1
LCF	15	Sile Burns (Rockbán) 1-0
Substitutes:
GK		Eileen Clifford (Na Piarsaigh for Murray (substituted on) 42' (substituted off) 48'
GK		Aoife Murray (Cloughduv) for Clifford (substituted on) 46'
MF		Jenny Duffy (St Finbarr’s) for Corkery (substituted on) 56'

Wexford:
GK	1	Mags D'Arcy (St Martin's)
RCB	2	Deirdre Codd (Duffry Rovers) (substituted off) 52'
FB	3	Catherine O'Loughlin (Monageer-Boolavogue)
LCB	4	Claire O'Connor (Rathnure)
RWB	5	Noeleen Lambert (St Martin's)
CB	6	Mary Leacy (Oulart–The Ballagh) (Captain)
LWB	7	Áine Codd (Duffry Rovers) 0-1
MF	8	Kate Kelly (St Ibar's) 0-5
MF	9	Caroline Murphy (Ferns) (substituted off) 45' 0-2
RWF	10	Louise Codd (Duffry Rovers) (substituted off) 35'
CF	11	Bróna Furlong (Duffry Rovers)
LWF	12	Michelle O'Leary (Rathnure) (substituted off) 42'
RCF	13	Una Leacy (Oulart–The Ballagh) 0-2
FF	14	Michelle Hearne (Oulart–The Ballagh) 2-0
LCF	15	Bridget Curran (St Ibar's) (substituted off) 42'
Substitutes:
RWF		Katrina Parrock (St Ibar's) for L Codd (substituted on) 35'
LCF		Ursula Jacob (Oulart–The Ballagh) for Curran (substituted on) 42'
MF		Rose-Marie Breen (Monageer-Boolavogue) for Murphy (substituted on) 45'
rCB		Avis Nolan (Monageer-Boolavogue) from Deirdre Codd (substituted on) 66'

Preceded by National Camogie League 2006	National Camogie League; 1977 – present	Succeeded by National Camogie League 2008
