= 2006 National Camogie League =

Camogie tournament

National Camogie League 2006
Winners
- Champions: Cork (13th title)

Runners-up
- Runners-up: Tipperary

The 2006 National Camogie League is a competition in the women's team field sport of camogie was won by Cork, who defeated Tipperary in the final, played at Thurles.

== The Final ==
The final was played immediately after the 2006 Munster Senior Hurling Championship match between Tipperary and Limerick. Cork settled well despite having to wait 12 minutes for their opening score. Tipperary got the better start with a Claire Grogan free after just a minute and a half. It took Cork another 10 minutes to open the scoring, when Jennifer O'Leary sent over the first of her four frees. An Emily Hayden goal gave Tipperary a 2-2 to 0-5 half time lead. Eimear Dillon scored a Cork goal on the restart to level the scores and from then on Cork were in full control.

== Division 2 ==
The Division 2 final, known until 2005 as the National Junior League, was won by Kilkenny intermediates who defeated Dublin in the final. The Division 3 final was won by Clare who defeated Derry in the final.

=== Final stages ===
May 14
Final

Cork	2-7 – 2-5	Tipperary

Thurles

Cork	Tipperary

Cork:
GK	1	Aoife Murray (Cloughduv)
RCB	2	Joanne Callaghan (Cloughduv) (capt)
FB	3	Cathriona Foley (Rockbán)
LCB	4	Amanda Regan (Douglas)
RWB	5	Briege Corkery (Cloughduv)
CB	6	Mary O'Connor (Killeagh)
LWB	7	Anna Geary (Milford)
MF	8	Gemma O'Connor (St Finbarr's)
MF	9	Rachel Maloney (Courcey Rovers)
RWF	10	Una O'Donoghue (Cloughduv)
CF	11	Jennifer O'Leary (Barryroe) (1-4, 0-4 frees)
LWF	12	Angela Walsh (Killeagh) (0-2)
RCF	13	Eimear Dillon (Ballygarvan) (1-1)
FF	14	Sarah O'Donovan (Cloughduv)
LCF	15	Elaine Burke (Valley Rovers) (substituted off) 51'
Substitutes:
LCF		Emer Watson (Milford) for Burke (substituted in) 51'

Tipperary:
GK	1	Jovita Delaney (Cashel)
RCB	2	Suzanne Kelly (Toomevara)
FB	3	Una O'Dwyer (Cashel)
LCB	4	Marie Tynan (Drom-Inch)
RWB	5	Sinéad Nealon (Burgess)
CB	6	Julia Kirwan (Moneygall)
LWB	7	Marie Shortt (Drom-Inch)
MF	8	Philly Fogarty (Cashel) (capt)
MF	9	Trish O'Halloran (Nenagh Éire Óg)
RWF	10	Cora Hennessy (Cashel) (substituted off) Half time'
CF	11	Emily Hayden (Cashel) (1-0)
LWF	12	Claire Grogan (Cashel) (0-5 frees)
RCF	13	Eimear McDonnell (Burgess)
FF	14	Geraldine Kinnane (Drom-Inch) (1-0)
LCF	15	Joanne Ryan (Drom-Inch) (substituted off) 49'
Substitutes:
RWF		Jill Horan (Cashel) for Hennessey (substituted in) Half time'
LCF		Lorraine Bourke (Drom & Inch) for Ryan (substituted in) 49'

Preceded by National Camogie League 2005	National Camogie League; 1977 – present	Succeeded by National Camogie League 2007
