= 2006 All-Ireland Senior Camogie Championship =

Camogie championship

All-Ireland Senior Camogie Championship 2006
Championship details
- Dates: 1 June — 9 September 2006
- Teams: 6

All-Ireland champions
- Winners: Cork (22nd win)
- Captain: Joanne Callaghan
- Manager: John Cronin

All-Ireland runners-up
- Runners-up: Tipperary
- Captain: Philly Fogarty
- Manager: Paddy McCormack

The 2006 All-Ireland Senior Camogie Championship—known as the Gala All-Ireland Senior Camogie Championship for sponsorship reasons—was the high point of the 2006 season in the sport of Camogie. The championship was won for the 22nd time by Cork who defeated Tipperary by an eight-point margin in the final despite having lost to them in the group stages. Rena Buckley was player of the match. The attendance was 20,685, at the time the second highest in camogie history.

== Format change ==
The championship was changed from knockout to a round-robin system for the first time in 2006. The system was retained, a decision criticised by Cork manager John Cronin. The six senior counties were all guaranteed a minimum of five competitive games, with the hope that standards all round would improve as a result of all the extra matches. Tipperary won their championship group game against Cork by 3-8 to 1-10 in Templemore, with two goals from Emily Hayden and a third from Louise Young. They eventually lost the All-Ireland final to the same opposition, something that was happen four times in the first six competitions under the new structure.

== Group stages ==
For the final round of the championship Marie O'Connor arrived in Athenry by helicopter after attending her brother's wedding and scored 2-2 as her side Kilkenny defeated Galway 3-5 to 0-10. Wexford defeated Limerick 4-18 to 0-4 in their final group game in Bruff but still did not qualify for the semis.

== Semi-finals ==
The closing stages were disappointing, Cork beating Galway by four points in a stop-start first semi-final and Claire Grogan’s sending Tipperary through to the final beating Kilkenny by five points in the second semi-final.

== Final ==
For the first time in camogie history, the All Ireland finals did not produce a single goal. Play flowed better than in the semi-finals and just one of the game's 16 scores, Jennifer O'Leary's fourth and final point for Cork, came from a free. Joanne Ryan fought what one reporter described as “mammoth and fascinating tussle” at midfield with Briege Corkery. Jim O’Sullivan, Gaelic games correspondent of the Irish Examiner, wrote:

Consistent with what the scoreline suggests, powerful defensive play was key to Cork retaining their title in style in yesterday’s Gala All-Ireland senior camogie championship final in Croke Park. Starting without five of the team which looked destined to win last year’s final until Cork produced five late points, Tipperary’s inexperience in attack was to undermine their challenge. The one-sided nature of the contest was primarily down to Cork’s superiority as a team, reflecting the confidence gained in victory 12 months ago and the determination to prove that it was no fluke.

Fintan McNamara of Clare refereed.

=== Final stages ===
August 11
Semi-Final

Cork	1-7 – 0–6	Galway

Nowlan Park, Kilkenny

August 12
Semi-Final

Tipperary	0-13 – 1-8	Kilkenny

Nowlan Park, Kilkenny

September 10
Final

Cork	0-12 – 0-4 .	Tipperary

Croke Park, Dublin

Cork	Tipperary

CORK:
GK	1	Aoife Murray (Cloughduv)
RCB	2	Joanne Callaghan (Cloughduv) (Capt)
FB	3	Cathriona Foley (Rockbán)
LCB	4	Amanda Regan (Douglas)
RWB	5	Rena Buckley (Inniscarra)
CB	6	Mary O'Connor (Killeagh)
LWB	7	Anna Geary (Milford)
MF	8	Gemma O'Connor (St Finbarr's) (0-2)
MF	9	Briege Corkery (Cloughduv) (0-1)
RWF	10	Rachel Maloney (Courcey Rovers) (0-1)
CF	11	Angela Walsh (Killeagh) (0-1) (substituted off) 49'
LWF	12	Jennifer O'Leary (Barryroe) (0-4)
RCF	13	Emer Dillon (Ballygarvan) (0-2)
FF	14	Una O'Donoghue (Cloughduv) (0-2)
LCF	15	Elaine Burke (Valley Rovers) (substituted off) 36'
Substitutes:
LCF		Sarah Donovan (Brian Dillons) for Burke (substituted in) 36'
CF		Orla Cotter (St Catherine’s) for Walsh (substituted in) 49'

TIPPERARY:
GK	1	Jovita Delaney (Cashel)
RCB	2	Suzanne Kelly (Toomevara)
FB	3	Una O'Dwyer (Cashel)
LCB	4	Julie Kirwan (Moneygall)
RWB	5	Michelle Shortt (Drom-Inch)
CB	6	Philly Fogarty (Cashel) (Capt)
LWB	7	Sinéad Nealon (Burgess)
MF	8	Claire Grogan (Cashel)
MF	9	Joanne Ryan (Drom-Inch) (0-1)
RWF	10	Jill Horan (Cashel) (substituted off) 48'
CF	11	Emily Hayden (Cashel) (0-2)
LWF	12	Cora Hennessy (Cashel) (substituted off) 45'
RCF	13	Geraldine Kinnane (Drom-Inch)
FF	14	Louise Young (Toomevara) (substituted off) Half time'
LCF	15	Eimear McDonnell (Burgess) (0-1).
Substitutes:
FF		Lorraine Bourke (Drom-Inch) for Young (substituted in) Half time'
LWF		Trish O'Halloran (Nenagh Éire Óg) for Hennessy (substituted in) 45'
RWF		Mary Ryan (Moneygall) for Horan (substituted in) 45'

Preceded by All-Ireland Senior Camogie Championship 2005	All-Ireland Senior Camogie Championship; 1932 – present	Succeeded by All-Ireland Senior Camogie Championship 2007
