= 2007 All-Ireland Senior Camogie Championship =

Camogie championship

All-Ireland Senior Camogie Championship 2007
Championship details
- Dates: 1 June — 9 September 2007
- Teams: 7

All-Ireland champions
- Winners: Wexford (4th win)
- Captain: Mary Leacy
- Manager: Alan Aherne; Noel Ryan; Eddie Flynn; Stellah Sinnott

All-Ireland runners-up
- Runners-up: Cork
- Captain: Gemma O'Connor
- Manager: John Cronin

The 2007 All-Ireland Senior Camogie Championship—known as the Gala All-Ireland Senior Camogie Championship for sponsorship reasons—was the high point of the 2007 season in the sport of camogie. The championship was won by Wexford who defeated Cork by a two-point margin in the final thanks to two first-half goals by ‘player of the match’ Una Leacy. The final attracted a record attendance of 33,154.

== Structure ==
Six teams competed in the Senior Championship out of twenty-seven who competed overall in the Senior, Intermediate and Junior Championships. They included Dublin, returning to senior ranks, managed by Tipperary born David Kennedy.

== Group Games ==
Cork, Galway, Tipperary and Wexford secured the semi-final spots. Wexford took revenge for their National Camogie League final defeat with an impressive 4–12 to 0–14 victory over Cork in the opening round at Ballincollig and six goals from Sarah Ryan gave Dublin a winning return to senior level with a 6–7 to 1–7 victory over Kilkenny in Portmarnock. Galway beat Kilkenny 1–12 to 1–4 in the second round. Cork beat Tipperary by 0–11 to 1-8 before Tipperary brought Wexford's unbeaten run to an end by 1–17 to 0–11.

== Semi-finals ==
In the semi-finals at Nowlan Park Kilkenny, Wexford defeated Galway 2–18 to 0–14 to secure a place in the final for the first time since 1994. Kate Kelly scored 1–11, her goal coming midway through the opening half after a pass from earlier goalscorer Michelle Hearne. Cork defeated Tipperary 2–11 to 0–9 in what was the fourth championship meeting of the sides that year, with goals from Angela Walsh and Una O'Donoghue giving them a place in the final for the seventh time in eight years.

== Final ==
The final was a tale of three goals. Wexford got the better start when Deirdre Codd won possession in the halfback line, cleared a long ball up-field which was won on the left wing by Ursula Jacob who passed to Michelle Hearne challenging two Cork defenders. The ball broke inside to Una Leacy, who shot past Cork goalkeeper Aoife Murray to the Hill 16-end net.

Una Leacy’s second goal came after 15 minutes. Deirdre Codd won possession at wing-back, her long delivery found Michelle Hearne, who broke the sliotar down and through to the in-rushing Una Leacy. She gathered, and while her first effort was blocked by defender Amanda O'Regan, she kept her composure and hand-passed to the net from the right edge of the square. Wexford's led by five points at half time, 2–2 to 0–3.

Cork's goal came in the 37th minute. Sile Burns sent in a high ball, and Emer Dillon flicked away the hurl of Wexford cornerback Avis Nolan, before gaining the loose ball and cutting the gap to 2–3 to 1–4 with a goal.

== Final stages ==
Cork cut the margin to a point, Wexford extended it to four, and it came back to two before Mags D’Arcy saved the championship when she saved well from an Orla Cotter shot as Cork sought an equalising goal. Una Leacy almost completed a third goal three minutes into added-time. But her low shot rebounded back off the post, when maybe a point would have been sufficient. Briege Corkery’s long range point four minutes into injury-time was the last score of the match, bringin Wexford’s final margin of success back to two points, 2-7 to 1-8.

== Selection Team ==
Alan Aherne (St Martin's), Eddie Flynn (Rathnure), Noel Ryan (Bunclody) and Stellah Sinnott (Buffers Alley) selected Wexford’s winning team.

== Mothers and daughters ==
Wexford’s victory set a record three of sets of mothers and daughters to have won All Ireland medals, (previously no mother and daughter had won All-Ireland senior medals in 76 years of competition) Margaret O'Leary (1968, 1969 and 1975) was the mother of Mary and Una Leacy, Kit Kehoe (1965, 1966 and 1975) was the mother of Áine Codd and Peggie Doyle (1969) was the mother of Kate Kelly respectively.

=== Final stages ===
August 12
Semi-Final

Cork	2-11 – 0–9	Tipperary

Nowlan Park, Kilkenny

August 12
Semi-Final

Wexford	2-18 – 0-14	Galway

Nowlan Park, Kilkenny

September 9
Final

Wexford	2–7 – 1–8	Cork

Croke Park, Dublin

Wexford	Cork

WEXFORD:
GK	1	Mags D'Arcy (St Martin's)
RCB	2	Noeleen Lambert (St Martin's)
FB	3	Catherine O'Loughlin (Monageer-Boolavogue)
LCB	4	Avis Nolan (Monageer-Boolavogue) (substituted off) 66'
RWB	5	Áine Codd (Duffry Rovers) (substituted off) 42'
CB	6	Mary Leacy (Oulart-The Ballagh) (Captain)
LWB	7	Deirdre Codd (Duffry Rovers)
MF	8	Kate Kelly (St Ibar’s) (0-3)
MF	9	Caroline Murphy (Ferns)
RWF	10	Bróna Furlong (Duffry Rovers)
CF	11	Rose-Mare Breen (Monageer-Boolavogue) (0-1)
LWF	12	Michelle O'Leary (Rathnure) (substituted off) 42'
RCF	13	Una Leacy (Oulart-The Ballagh) (2-0)
FF	14	Michelle Hearne (Oulart-The Ballagh)
LCF	15	Ursula Jacob (Oulart–The Ballagh) (0-2).
Substitutes:
LWB		Aoife O'Connor (Rathnure) for Āine Codd (substituted on) 35'
LWF		Katrina Parrock (St Ibar’s) for O'Riordan (substituted on) 42'
LCB		Claire O'Connor (Rathnure) for Nolan (substituted on) 66'

CORK:
GK	1	Aoife Murray (Cloughduv)
RCB	2	Joanne Callaghan (Cloughduv)
FB	3	Cathriona Foley (Rockbán)
LCB	4	Amanda Regan (Douglas)
RWB	5	Rena Buckley (Inniscarra)
CB	6	Mary O'Connor (Killeagh)
LWB	7	Anna Geary (Milford)
MF	8	Briege Corkery (Cloughduv) (0-1)
MF	9	Gemma O'Connor (St Finbarr's) (Captain) (0-3)
RWF	10	Una O'Donoghue (Cloughduv) (substituted off) 52'
CF	11	Angela Walsh (Killeagh) (0-1) (substituted off) 56'
LWF	12	Jennifer O'Leary (Barryroe) (0-1)
RCF	13	Emer Dillon (Ballygarvan) (1-1)
FF	14	Orla Cotter (St Catherine's) (0-1)
LCF	15	Sile Burns (Rockbán)
Substitutes:
RWF		Emer Watson (Milford) for O'Donoghue (substituted on) 52'
CF		Sarah O'Donovan (Brian Dillons) for Walsh (substituted on) 56'

Preceded by All-Ireland Senior Camogie Championship 2006	All-Ireland Senior Camogie Championship; 1932 – present	Succeeded by All-Ireland Senior Camogie Championship 2008
