= 2005 All-Ireland Senior Camogie Championship =

Camogie championship

All-Ireland Senior Camogie Championship 2005
Championship details
- Dates: 1 June — 18 September 2005
- Teams: 7

All-Ireland champions
- Winners: Cork (21st win)
- Captain: Elaine Burke
- Manager: Fiona O'Driscoll

All-Ireland runners-up
- Runners-up: Tipperary
- Captain: Philly Fogarty
- Manager: Paddy McCormack

Championship statistics
- Matches played: 22

The 2005 All-Ireland Senior Camogie Championship—known as the Foras na Gaeilge All-Ireland Senior Camogie Championship for sponsorship reasons—was the high point of the 2005 season in the sport of camogie. The championship was won for the 21st time by Cork who defeated Tipperary by a four-point margin in the final and became part of the legendary “rebel treble” of 2005 when Cork won the senior hurling, camogie and ladies’ football titles. The attendance was 14,350.

== New sponsors ==
The championship was the first to take place under the sponsorship of Gala, who replaced Foras na Gaeilge as headline sponsors.

== Group stages ==
Two goals in three second-half minutes saw Wexford through to the semi-final on August 20 when they beat Galway in Ballinasloe. The first goal came with seven minutes left from Ursula Jacob and they added two more through Kate Kelly and Una Leacy.

== Semi-finals ==
Cork defeated Limerick by 27 points in the most one-sided semi-final for thirty years. Tipperary defeated Wexford by eight points to qualify for their seventh consecutive All-Ireland final.

== Final ==
For a time it appeared that a lucky Tipperary goal three minutes before half-time seemed to have established the destiny of the final. Claire Grogan's speculative lob bounced in front of All Star goalkeeper Aoife Murray who took her eye off it momentarily to allow it through her legs, a huge set-back after Cork had battled back from a four-point deficit to trail by just a point.

Tipperary looked destined to retain their title throughout the second half until Cork produced five late points, Cork manager John Cronin having switched the 18-year-old Briege Corkery and Gemma O'Connor to midfield in the second half to roll back the dominance of Philly Fogarty.

== Leg 2 of the Rebel Treble ==
After the match Cork captain Elaine Burke memorably announced: "Rebels abú arís" reflecting the euphoria surrounding Cork’s recapture of the All-Ireland Senior Hurling Championship from Galway a week earlier. Rena Buckley, Briege Corkery and substitute Angela Walsh were to feature in Cork’s victory in the All-Ireland Senior Ladies' Football Championship a fortnight later, after which Cork captain Juliet Murphy coined the phrase ‘rebel treble.” Five players featured on both camogie and ladies' football panels.

=== Final stages ===
August 11
Semi-Final

Cork	5-17 – 0–5	Limerick

Nowlan Park, Kilkenny

August 12
Semi-Final

Tipperary	1-13 – 1-5	Wexford

Nowlan Park, Kilkenny

September 18
Final

Cork	1-17 – 1-13	Tipperary

Croke Park, Dublin

Cork	Tipperary

CORK:
GK	1	Aoife Murray (Cloughduv)
RCB	2	Rena Buckley (Inniscarra)
FB	3	Rosarie Holland (Barryroe)
LCB	4	Amanda Regan (Douglas)
RWB	5	Briege Corkery (Cloughduv) (0-1)
CB	6	Mary O'Connor (Killeagh)
LWB	7	Anna Geary (Milford)
MF	8	Vivienne Harris (Bishopstown) (substituted off) Half time'
MF	9	Rachel Maloney (Courcey Rovers) (0-1)
RWF	10	Una O'Donoghue (Cloughduv) (1-1) (substituted off) 55'
CF	11	Gemma O'Connor (St Finbarr's) (0-3)
LWF	12	Jennifer O'Leary (Barryroe) (0-4)
RCF	13	Emer Dillon (Ballygarvan) (0-4)
FF	14	Stephanie Dunlea (Cloughduv) (0-1)
LCF	15	Elaine Burke (Valley Rovers) (0-1) (captain) (substituted off) 51'
Substitutes:
MF		Joanne Callaghan (Cloughduv) for Harris (substituted in) Half time'
RWF		Angela Walsh (Killeagh) for O’Donoghue (substituted in) 55'
LCF		Sarah Donovan (Ballygarvan) for Burke (substituted in) 51'

TIPPERARY:
GK	1	Jovita Delaney (Cashel)
RCB	2	Suzanne Kelly (Toomevara)
FB	3	Una O'Dwyer (Cashel)
LCB	4	Julie Kirwan (Moneygall)
RWB	5	Sinéad Nealon (Burgess)
CB	6	Ciara Gaynor (Burgess) (substituted off) 55'
LWB	7	Therese Brophy (Burgess)
MF	8	Philly Fogarty (Cashel) (0-1)
MF	9	Angie McDermott (Kildangan)
RWF	10	Joanne Ryan (Drom-Inch) (0-1)
CF	11	Noelle Kennedy (Toomevara) (0-1) (substituted off) 37'
LWF	12	Claire Grogan (Cashel) (1-5)
RCF	13	Eimear McDonnell (Burgess) (0-2)
FF	14	Deirdre Hughes (Toomevara) (0-1)
LCF	15	Jill Horan (Cashel) (0-2)
Substitutes:
CB		Michelle Shortt (Drom-Inch) for Gaynor (substituted in) 55'
CF		Emily Hayden (Cashel) for Kennedy (substituted in) 37'

Preceded by All-Ireland Senior Camogie Championship 2004	All-Ireland Senior Camogie Championship; 1932 – present	Succeeded by All-Ireland Senior Camogie Championship 2006
