= Regina Glynn =

Irish camogie player

Personal information
- Native name: Rioghna Ní Gloinn (Irish)
- Born: County Galway, Ireland

Sport
- Sport: Camogie
- Position: Corner back
Club
- Years: Club
- Athenry
Inter-county
- Years: County
- Galway
Inter-county titles
- All Stars: 3

Regina Glynn is a former camogie player from County Galway in Ireland. She won Camogie All Stars Awards in 2006, 2009 and 2010. Glynn also played in the 2008 All Ireland final and the 2009 All Ireland club final. She won a Senior All Ireland camogie medal with Galway in 2013, and 2 Ashbourne College cups with the University of Limerick in 2005 and 2006.
