= Una O'Dwyer =

Una O'Dwyer may refer to:

- Una O'Dwyer (camogie)
- Una, Lady O'Dwyer, wife of Michael O'Dwyer, Lieutenant Governor of the Punjab
