= De La Salle GAA =

Gaelic games club in County Waterford, Ireland

De La Salle GAA Club
- De La Salle CLCG
- Founded: 1929
- County: Waterford
- Colours: White and Red
- Grounds: Cleaboy and Gracedieu
- Coordinates: 52°15′26.98″N 7°08′15.77″W

Playing kits
Standard colours

Senior Club Championships
	All Ireland	Munster champions	Waterford champions
Football:	-	-	6
Hurling:	-	2	3
Camogie:	-	-	3

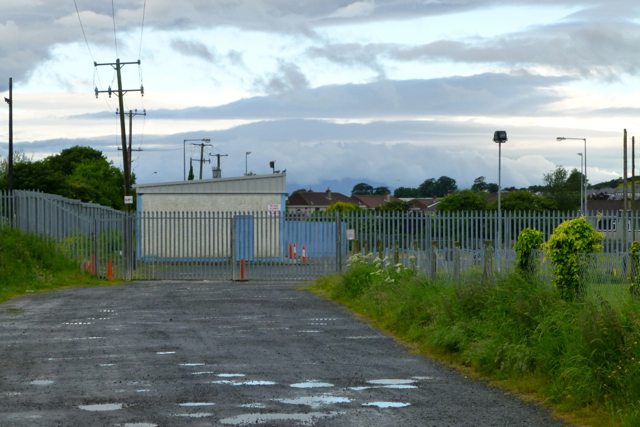
De La Salle grounds at Cleaboy

De La Salle Gaelic football and hurling club is based in Waterford City, Ireland. The club competes in Gaelic games competitions organised by Waterford GAA board. The club has won the Waterford Senior Hurling Championship twice and the Waterford Senior Football Championship on 6 occasions. While having a notable record in gaelic football, today the club mainly focuses on hurling and camogie.

== History ==
The club takes its name from St. Stephens De La Salle National School in Patrick Street and previous to the current club being established, fielded a hurling team under the name of St. Stephens. St. Stephens won 2 Senior County Hurling Championships, 1913 and 1914. In recent years the club has concentrated on developing juvenile players and now has one of the biggest under age setups in the South East of Ireland. The club has produced many Senior Inter County hurlers in the last few years such as John Mullane, Johnny and Stephen Brenner, Kevin Moran, Bryan Phelan and Derek McGrath. The club has also won numerous under age County titles in Hurling and Football as well as All Ireland Feile (Under 14 Championships) in both codes. There were 5 De La Salle players on the Waterford U-21 team which won the counties only U-21 All-Ireland in 1992.

John Barron (1959) is the only De La Salle player to win a Senior All-Ireland hurling medal.

Stephen Brenner, John Mullane, Bryan Phelan and Kevin Moran have won Munster Senior Hurling Championship medals with Waterford and also a National Hurling League Title.

The late Sonny Walsh also won a National League medal with Waterford. De La Salle is a family club with famous families like the Brenners, the Daltons and the Duggans part of its core for many years. The club is also very proud of its association with the De La Salle Brothers and wears the crest of St. John Baptist de la Salle on their jerseys.

2008 was an historic year for the club, moving to their new grounds in Gracedieu and winning their first Senior County Hurling title. The club also won the County Under 21 hurling championship and the Munster Senior Club Hurling Championship. In December De La Salle were honoured as club of the year in both Waterford and in Munster. On 21 February 2009 the club made history by being the first club to reach the All-Ireland Senior Club Hurling Championship Final at their first attempt when they beat Ruari Og of Cushendall by 1-21 to 1-19 (after extra time) in the All Ireland semi final at Parnell Park in Dublin. In November 2010, they won their second Munster Senior Club Hurling Championship after a 0-9 to 0-8 win against Thurles Sarsfields GAA.

In 2022, they won the Waterford Senior Camogie Championship for the first time. In 2023, they could defend the title and their player Beth Carton was awarded Camogie Player of the Year. In 2025 the club won their third Waterford Senior Camogie Championship.

== Notable players ==
- Kevin Moran
- Stephen Daniels
- Jake Dillon
- John Mullane
- Beth Carton (Camogie Player of the Year 2023)

== Honours ==
=== Hurling ===
- Munster Senior Club Hurling Championships: 2
  - 2008, 2010
- Waterford Senior Hurling Championships: 3
  - 2008, 2010, 2012
- Waterford Intermediate Hurling Championships: (2)
  - 1965, 1990
- Waterford Junior Hurling Championships: (1)
  - 1954
- Waterford Under-20 Hurling Championships: (6)
  - 2008, 2013, 2015, 2016, 2017, 2022
- Waterford Minor hurling Championship (6)
  - 1961, 1989, 2005, 2013, 2016, 2022

=== Football ===
- Waterford Senior Football Championships: 6
  - 1931, 1933, 1934, 1935, 1936, 1958
- Waterford Intermediate Football Championships: 1
  - 2013
- Waterford Minor Football Championship (13)
  - 1929, 1930, 1931, 1938 (as St. Stephen's), 1939 (as St. Stephen's), 1941 (as St. Stephen's), 1942 (as St. Stephen's), 1943 (as St. Stephen's), 1953, 1979, 1985, 2010, 2022

=== Camogie ===
- Waterford Senior Camogie Championship: 3
  - 2022, 2023, 2025

== All Stars ==
- John Mullane - 2003, 2009, 2010, 2011, 2012
- Kevin Moran - 2012
- Beth Carton - 2018, 2019, 2022, 2023, 2025
