= Ashling Thompson =

Irish camogie player

Personal information
- Native name: Aisling Nic Thómais (Irish)
- Born: 5 March 1990 (age 36) Cork, Ireland
- Occupation: Personal Trainer

Sport
- Sport: Camogie
- Position: Midfielder
Club
- Years: Club
- 1997-: Milford
Club titles
- Cork titles: 4
- Munster titles: 4
- All-Ireland Titles: 3
Inter-county
- Years: County
- 2006–: Cork
Inter-county titles
- All-Irelands: 7
- All Stars: 5

Ashling Thompson is an Irish sportswoman. She plays camogie with her local club, Milford, and with the Cork Senior Camogie team.

== Career ==
Thompson began playing camogie for Milford aged 7. With them, she has won three All-Ireland Senior Club Camogie Championships.

Ashling has won the All-Ireland camogie championship with Cork seven times. She helped her team to glory in: 2014, 2015, 2017, 2018, 2023, 2024 and 2026.

Thompson won an All Star Award in 2015, 2017, 2022, 2024 and 2025.

She was the subject of a Laochra Gael episode in 2018.

== Personal life ==
Thompson's mother was involved in the founding of Milford camogie club.

A car accident in 2009 caused severe muscle damage to her neck and back and led to a period of mental illness. In 2012, a boyfriend committed suicide. Thompson supports the Irish Life Health Schools' Fitness Challenge and has spoken out on mental health issues.

Thompson appeared on The Late Late Show on 10 February 2017.

She is known for her large collection of tattoos, and work with various charities.

On 25 June 2019, Thompson was ordered to pay a total of €6,000 to avoid a conviction by Cork District Court after she entered a guilty plea to assaulting two separate individuals unprovoked while on a night out on 25 February 2018.

== See also ==
- 2018 All-Ireland Senior Camogie Championship
