= 1939 All-Ireland Senior Camogie Championship =

Camogie championship

All-Ireland Senior Camogie Championship 1939
Tournament details
- Date: 14 May – 12 November

Winners
- Champions: Cork (4th title)
- Captain: Renee Fitzgerald

Runners-up
- Runners-up: Galway
- Captain: Peg Morris

Other
- Matches played: 2

The 1939 All-Ireland Senior Camogie Championship was the high point of the 1939 season in Camogie. The championship was won by Cork, who defeated Galway by a 15-point margin in the final.

== Semi-final ==
The exclusion of All Ireland champions Dublin in a dispute over the ban on hockey players (in practice the All Ireland championship was organised by the National Camógaíocht Association while Dublin remained in the old Association with support from Kildare and clubs in Meath and Wicklow) was to lead to an eight-year-long split in the Camogie Association. It opened the way for Louth to win the Leinster championship once more, defeating Meath by 8–2 to 4–1 in the Leinster final in Darver. A goal entering the third quarter from Kitty Buckley and two from Renee Fitzgerald were the turning points in Cork's 6–3 to 2–3 victory over Louth in the semi-final. Louth refused Cork's offer of a walkover in the All Ireland semi-final, also fixed for Darver. They paid Cork's travelling expenses, organised a welcome reception and then made their exit from the championship by an 11-point margin. Patsy McCullagh scored all of Galway's 2–1 in the semi-final in Belfast but missed the final.

== Final ==
Renee Fitzgerald scored four goals in the final as Cork won by 15 points. Cork were not presented with the O'Duffy Cup as Dublin had not returned it. They played in grey, green and white, the colours of county champions, Old Aloysians, who supplied ten of the starting twelve.

=== Final stages ===
22 October
Semi-Final

Galway	2–1 – 1–1	Antrim

McRory Park

29 October
Semi-Final

Cork	6–2 – 2–3	Louth

Darver

12 November
Final

Cork	6–1 – 1–1	Galway

Croke Park

Cork	Galway

Cork:
GK	1	Peggy Hogg
FB	2	Joan Cotter
RWB	3	Bríd Cronin
CB	4	Kathleen Coughlan
LWB	5	Mary Fitzgerald
MF	6	Nan O'Dowd
MF	7	Lil Kirby (0–1)
MF	8	Maura Cronin
RWF	9	Kitty Buckley (1–0)
CF	10	Josie McGrath
LWF	11	Eileen Casey (1–0)
FF	12	Renee Fitzgerald (Capt) (4–0)

Galway:
GK	1	Josie Melvin
FB	2	Kathleen Keyes
RWB	3	Monica Duggan
CB	4	Catherine Griffin
LWB	5	Nora O'Connell
MF	6	Nora Kavanagh
MF	7	Kathleen Cosgrave
MF	8	Frances Coen
RWF	9	Hilda Murphy (1–0)
CF	10	Eileen O'Beirne
LWF	11	Peg Morris (Capt) (0–1)
FF	12	Celia Mulholland

Match Rules

- 50 minutes
- Replay if scores level
- Maximum of 3 substitutions

== See also ==
- All-Ireland Senior Hurling Championship
- Wikipedia List of Camogie players
- National Camogie League
- Camogie All Stars Awards
- Ashbourne Cup

Preceded by 1938 All-Ireland Senior Camogie Championship	All-Ireland Senior Camogie Championship; 1932–present	Succeeded by 1940 All-Ireland Senior Camogie Championship
