= Jessica Gill =

Camogie player

Personal information
- Native name: Jessica Ní Giolla (Irish)
- Born: 1989 (age 36–37) Galway, Ireland

Sport
- Sport: Camogie
- Position: Wing forward
Club*
Years	Club	Apps (scores)
2004-present	Athenry	?
Club titles
- Galway titles: 5
- All-Ireland Titles: 1
Inter-county**
Years	County	Apps (scores)
2008-present	Galway	?
Inter-county titles
- All-Irelands: 3
- All Stars: 1
- * club appearances and scores correct as of (12:27, 4 January 2026 (UTC)). **Inter County team apps and scores correct as of (12:27, 4 January 2026 (UTC)).

Jessica Gill is a camogie player. She won a camogie All Star award in 2008 and played in the 2008 All Ireland final and 2009 All Ireland club final. She was named the 2007 Young Player of the Year.

Jessica Gill sought an All-Ireland senior medal. Having finished her inter-county career ten years prior, winning an All-Ireland club medal with Athenry was the remaining way for her to achieve this.

As a 15-year-old midfielder in Athenry’s one-point county final defeat, she was pivotal in the four-in-a-row Galway club camogie titles that followed.

Gill was Camogie’s young player of the year in 2007. The provider of 2-6 in Athenry’s All-Ireland semi-final stunning of four-in-a-row chasing St Lachtain’s of Kilkenny.

== Honours ==
=== Club ===
- All-Ireland Senior Club Camogie Championship (1): 2025
- Galway Senior Camogie Championship (5): 2006, 2007, 2008, 2009, 2025

=== County ===
- All-Ireland Senior Camogie Championship (1): 2013
