= Joanne O'Callaghan =

Personal information
- Born: Ireland

Sport
- Sport: Camogie
- Position: corner -Back
Club
- Years: Club
- Cloughduv

Joanne O'Callaghan is a camogie player from County Cork, She won All-Ireland Senior Camogie Championship medals in 2002, 2005, 2006, 2008, 2009 and 2014. She also previous won Minor and Intermediate All-Ireland championship medals as well as Ashbourne Cup and Gael Linn honours. At club level, she has played with Cloughduv.
