= Emer Dillon =

Camogie player

Personal information
- Born: 1983 (age 42–43)

Sport
- Sport: Camogie
Club
- Years: Club
- Ballygarvan GAA
Inter-county
- Years: County
- Cork
Inter-county titles
- All-Irelands: 4

Emer Dillon (born 1983 or 1984) is an Irish camogie player. She won several All-Ireland Senior Camogie Championship titles with Cork, including in the 2002, 2005, 2006 and 2009 All-Ireland Senior Camogie Championships. She received a Camogie All-Star Award in 2005, and was also nominated for an All-Star following the 2006 campaign. By 2010, Dillon had retired from inter-county camogie.

At club level, Dillon played camogie with Ballygarvan GAA. She has also played hockey for the Cork Harlequins club, and previously represented Munster and Ireland in the same sport.
