= Stephen Daniels =

Irish hurler

Personal information
- Native name: Stiofáin Ó Dónaill (Irish)
- Born: 20 July 1990 (age 36) Waterford, Ireland
- Height: 1.88 m (6 ft 2 in)

Sport
- Sport: Hurling
- Position: Right Corner Back
Club
- Years: Club
- 2007-: De La Salle
Club titles
- Waterford titles: 3
- Munster titles: 2
Inter-county
- Years: County
- 2010-: Waterford
Inter-county titles
- Munster titles: 1
- NHL: 1

Stephen Daniels (born 20 July 1990) is an Irish hurler who currently plays as a left corner-back for the Waterford senior team.

Daniels made his first appearance for the team during the 2010 National League, however, he didn't become a Waterford regular until the 2012 championship. A former member of the Waterford minor and under-21 teams, he has yet to win any major honors at senior level with Waterford.

At club level Daniels is a two-time Munster medalist with De La Salle. In addition to this he has also won two county club championship medals.
