= 2014 All-Ireland Senior Camogie Championship final =

2014 All-Ireland Senior Camogie Final
- Event: All-Ireland Senior Camogie Championship 2014
Cork	Kilkenny
2-12	1-09
- Date: 14 September 2014
- Venue: Croke Park, Dublin
- Referee: J. Dolan (Clare)

The 2014 All-Ireland Senior Camogie Championship Final, the 83rd event of its type, is the culmination of the 2014 All-Ireland Senior Camogie Championship.

Trailing the Cats by five points at half time, Cork produced a stunning comeback in the second half to win their 25th title by six points.
