= Beth Carton =

Camogie player for De La Salle and county Waterford

Personal information
- Occupation: Teacher

Sport
- Sport: Camogie
- Position: Forward
Club
- Years: Club
- De La Salle GAA
Club titles
- Waterford titles: 3
College
- Years: College
- 2017-2020: University of Limerick
Inter-county
- Years: County
- 2015-current: Waterford
Inter-county titles
- All Stars: 5

Beth Carton is a camogie player from Waterford. She plays as a forward for her club De La Salle and the Waterford.county team. She works as a PE and Geography teacher. She was Camogie Player of the Year in 2023.

== Carreer ==
Beth Carton started playing camogie when she was 4-years old. due her father Joey Carton who was coach in De La Salle.

In 2015 she won the All-Ireland Intermediate Camogie Championship with Waterford to reach Senior status for Waterford for the first time.

She was part of the University of Limerick team that won the Ashbourne Cup five times in a row in 2017 to 2020.

In 2018 she was an important part of the Waterford team that reached the quarter-final of the All-Ireland Senior Championship and was awarded with a Camogie All Stars Awards that year the first one for a player from Waterford.

She won the Waterford Senior Camogie Championship in 2022, the first for her club De La Salle.

2023 marks her biggest year so far. With her county she won Division 1B of the National Camogie League and reached the final of the All-Ireland Senior Championship for the first time in 78 years. With De La Salle she defended the Waterford Senior Camogie Championship title. At the end of the year she was selected for the Camogie All Stars Awards for the 4th time and became Camogie player of the Year.

In 2025 Waterford reached the All-Ireland semi-finals and she won her third Waterford Senior Championship with De La Salle and reached the Munster Senior Club Camogie Final. She won her 5th Camogie All Stars Award,

In 2026 Waterford reached the final of the National Camogie League but lost to Galway.

== Titles ==
National Camogie League Division 1B: 1

- 2023

All-Ireland Intermediate Camogie Championship: 1

- 2015

Waterford Senior Camogie Championship: 3

- 2022, 2023, 2025

Ashbourne Cup:

- 2017, 2018, 2019, 2020

== Awards ==
Player of the Year

- 2023

Camogie All Stars Awards

- 2018, 2019, 2022, 2023, 2025

Munster GAA Camogie Player of the Year

- 2019

Ashbourne All-Stars

- 2019, 2020
