= Patricia Morrissey =

Irish camogie player

Personal information
- Native name: Páidrigín Ní Mhuirgheasa (Irish)
- Born: County Clare, Ireland

Sport
- Sport: Camogie
- Position: Centre back, centre field
Club*
Years	Club	Apps (scores)
	UCD	?
Inter-county**
Years	County	Apps (scores)
	Clare	?
- * club appearances and scores correct as of (16:31, 30 June 2010 (UTC)). **Inter County team apps and scores correct as of (16:31, 30 June 2010 (UTC)).

Patricia Morrissey is a former camogie (Irish women's stick-and-ball team sport) player, winner of the Elvery Cup for the short-lived ‘Miss Camogie’ award in 1971. From Quilty, County Clare, she played for the UCD Ashbourne Cup winning team and captained Dublin to the 1971 junior All Ireland title.
