= 2008 All-Ireland Senior Camogie Championship =

Camogie championship

All-Ireland Senior Camogie Championship 2008
Championship details
- Dates: 1 June — 14 September 2008
- Teams: 7

All-Ireland champions
- Winners: Cork (22nd win)
- Captain: Cathriona Foley
- Manager: Denise Cronin

All-Ireland runners-up
- Runners-up: Galway
- Captain: Sinéad Cahalan
- Manager: Liam Donoghue

The 2008 All-Ireland Senior Camogie Championship—known as the Gala All-Ireland Senior Camogie Championship for sponsorship reasons—was the high point of the 2008 season. The championship was won by Cork who defeated Galway by a five-point margin in the final. The championship was played between June 1 and September 14, 2008. The format was as follows: seven county teams entered. Each team played all of the others once, earning 2 points for a win and 1 for a draw. The top four teams qualified for the semi-finals.

== Group stages ==
Substitute Lourda Kavanagh’s late goal helped Galway to a surprise against Cork in the group stages by 1–9 to 0–8 at Páirc Ui Rinn. Cork went on to gain revenge when the same teams med again in the All-Ireland final, the second time a group result had been reversed in the final in the three years since the round-robin format was introduced into the championship in 2006.

== Results ==
=== Group stage ===
The cross table below summarises the group stages, which were played from June 1 to August 3, 2008. Away results are italicised.

| Team | C | G | W | T | K | D | L | Pts |
|---|---|---|---|---|---|---|---|---|
| Cork | - | 0 | 2 | 2 | 2 | 2 | 2 | 10 |
| Galway | 2 | - | 2 | 1 | 0 | 2 | 2 | 9 |
| Wexford | 0 | 0 | - | 2 | 2 | 2 | 2 | 8 |
| Tipperary | 0 | 1 | 0 | - | 2 | 2 | 2 | 7 |
| Kilkenny | 0 | 2 | 0 | 0 | - | 2 | 2 | 6 |
| Dublin | 0 | 0 | 0 | 0 | 0 | - | 2 | 2 |
| Limerick | 0 | 0 | 0 | 0 | 0 | 0 | - | 0 |

=== Final stages ===
August 24
Semi-Final

| Cork | 3–14 – 0–10 | Tipperary |

Nowlan Park, Kilkenny

August 24
Semi-Final

| Wexford | 1–10 – 1–13 | Galway |

Nowlan Park, Kilkenny

September 14
Final

| Cork | 2–10 – 1–8 | Galway |

Croke Park, Dublin

| Cork | Galway |

CORK:
| GK | 1 | Aoife Murray (Cloughduv) |
| RCB | 2 | Linda O'Connell (St Finbarr's) |
| FB | 3 | Cathriona Foley (Rockbán) (captain) |
| LCB | 4 | Joanne Callaghan (Cloughduv) |
| RWB | 5 | Gemma O'Connor (St Finbarr's) |
| CB | 6 | Mary O'Connor (Killeagh) |
| LWB | 7 | Sarah Hayes (Courcey Rovers) |
| MF | 8 | Orla Cotter (St Catherine’s) 0-1 |
| MF | 9 | Briege Corkery (Cloughduv) 0-1 |
| RWF | 10 | Amanda Regan (Douglas) (substituted off) 57' |
| CF | 11 | Una O'Donoghue (Cloughduv) (substituted off) 47' |
| LWF | 12 | Emer O'Sullivan (Ballinhassig) 0-1 |
| RCF | 13 | Sile Burns (Rockbán) (captain) 2-0 |
| FF | 14 | Rachel Maloney (Courcey Rovers) 0-7 |
| LCF | 15 | Elaine Riordan (Milford) (substituted off) Half time' |
Substitutes:
| LCF | | Emer Farrell (Sarsfields) for O'Riordan (substituted on) (half-time)' |
| CF | | Rena Buckley (Inniscarra) for O'Donoghue (substituted on) 47' |
| RWF | | Linda Dorgan (Inniscarra) for O'Regan (substituted on) 57' |

GALWAY:
| GK | 1 | Susan Earner (Meelick Eyrecourt) |
| RCB | 2 | Sandra Tannian (St Thomas) |
| FB | 3 | Aibhe Kelly (Davitts) |
| LCB | 4 | Therese Manton (Mullagh) |
| RWB | 5 | Ann Marie Hayes (Killimor) |
| CB | 6 | Sinéad Cahalan (Mullagh) (captain) |
| LWB | 7 | Niamh Kilkenny (Pearses) |
| MF | 8 | Aine Hillary (Pearses) 1-0 |
| MF | 9 | Sarah Noone (Ahascragh-Caltra) (substituted off) 48' |
| RWF | 10 | Molly Dunne (Meelick Eyrecourt) (substituted off) Half time' |
| CF | 11 | Therese Maher (Athenry) |
| LWF | 12 | Veronica Curtin (Kinvara) |
| RCF | 13 | Orla Kilkenny (Pearses) |
| FF | 14 | Jessica Gill (Athenry) |
| LCF | 15 | Brenda Kerins (Ardrahan) (substituted off) 58' |
Substitutes:
| RWF | | Lourda Kavanagh (Davitts) for Dunne (substituted on) (half-time)' |
| MF | | Catriona Cormican (Cappataggle for Noone (substituted on) 48' |
| LCF | | Deirdre Burke (Meelick Eyrecourt) for Kerins (substituted on) 58' |

| Preceded by All-Ireland Senior Camogie Championship 2007 | All-Ireland Senior Camogie Championship; 1932 – present | Succeeded by All-Ireland Senior Camogie Championship 2009 |
