= Catherine O'Loughlin (Wexford camogie player) =

Irish camogie player

Catherine O’Loughlin
Personal information
- Native name: Caitríona Ní Lochlainn (Irish)
- Nickname: Locky
- Born: Wexford, Ireland

Sport
- Sport: Camogie
- Position: Full back
Club*
Years	Club	Apps (scores)
	Monageer-Boolavogue Buffers Alley	?
Inter-county**
Years	County	Apps (scores)
	Wexford	?
Inter-county titles
- All-Irelands: 4
- All Stars: 6
- * club appearances and scores correct as of (16:31, 30 June 2010 (UTC)). **Inter County team apps and scores correct as of (16:31, 30 June 2010 (UTC)).

Catherine O’Loughlin is a camogie player, winner of six All-Star awards in 2005, 2007, 2008, 2010 and 2011 and 2012 and four-time winner of the All Ireland championship in 2007, 2010,2011 and 2012. She was nominated for further All-Stars in 2006, 2009. and 2010 and a member of the 2011 Team of the Championship. She won four All Ireland medals with Wexford in 2007, 2010 2011 and 2012

== Other awards ==
National League Division one 2009; All Star 2005, 2007, 2008; She was an All Star nominee in 2006, Wexford Supporters' Club player of the year 2008; Ashbourne All Star 2005, 2006; Ashbourne Cup player of the tournament 2005; Junior Gael Linn Cup with Leinster 2001; Senior Gael Linn Cup with Leinster 2006; All-Ireland Junior Colleges with Coláiste Bríde 2000; Leinster Under-16 2000; Leinster Senior 2001, 2004, 2007; Leinster Junior 2003; Club Senior 'B' 2004, 2008; Purple and Gold Star 2008. Because she spent six months travelling abroad her third All Star award was collected on her behalf by her sister, Liz.
