= Paudie Murray =

Cork hurler and camogie manager

Personal information
- Native name: Páidí Ó Muirí (Irish)
- Born: 1970 (age 55–56) Kilmichael, County Cork, Ireland
- Occupation: Financial consultant
- Height: 5 ft 7 in (170 cm)

Sport
- Sport: Hurling
Clubs
- Years: Club
- Kilmichael GAA; Dohenys; Cloughduv → Muskerry; St Finbarr's
Club titles
- Cork titles: 0
Club management
- Years: Club
- Dohenys
Inter-county management
- Years: Team
- 2011–2021: Cork (camogie senior team)
Inter-county titles as manager
County	League	Province	All-Ireland
Cork (camogie)	4	0	0

Pádraig Murray (born 1970) is an Irish cork camogie manager and former hurler, who spent a decade as manager of the Cork senior camogie team. He is a former player with club sides Cloughduv and Dohenys and the Muskerry divisional team.

== Playing career ==
Murray first came to sporting prominence as a hurler with Cloughduv and as a Gaelic footballer with Dohenys. He enjoyed more success with the latter, winning a County Junior Championship title in 1993 before captaining the team to the County Intermediate Championship title two years later. He also earned selection with the Muskerry divisional team, before later joining the St Finbarr's club. Murray's inter-county experience was limited to one season with the Cork minor hurling team. He lined came on as a substitute in Cork's 1988 All-Ireland MHC final defeat by Kilkenny.

== Managerial career ==
Murray's first move into management came during a two-year spell with the Dohenys senior football team in 2010 and 2011. He was appointed manager of the Cork senior camogie team in December 2011, serving in that position for a decade. During that time Murray guided the team to four All-Ireland SCC titles from seven appearances in finals.

Murray is expected to be named manager of the Cork minor hurling team for the 2022 season.

== Honours ==
=== Player ===
Kilmichael

- Mid Cork Junior A Football Championship: 1987

Dohenys

- Cork Intermediate Football Championship: 1995 (c)
- Cork Junior A Football Championship: 1993
- South West Junior A Football Championship: 1992, 1993

Cork

- Munster Minor Hurling Championship: 1988

Munster U-21 Hurling Championship 1991 Munster & All Ireland Junior Football 1996

=== Manager ===
Cork

- All-Ireland Senior Camogie Championship: 2014, 2015, 2017, 2018

All-Ireland Intermediate Camogie Championship 2018

Sporting positions
Preceded by Joe O'Brien	Cork senior camogie team manager 2011–2021	Succeeded by Matthew Twomey
Preceded by Noel Furlong	Cork minor hurling team manager 2021–2022	Succeeded by Kieran Murphy
