= 2013 National Camogie League =

Camogie tournament

League details
- Dates: February – 5 May 2013

League champions
- Winners: Cork (16th win)
- Captain: Anna Geary

League runners-up
- Runners-up: Wexford
- Captain: Ursula Jacob

The 2013 National Camogie League, known for sponsorship reasons as the Irish Daily Star National Camogie League, commenced in February 2013 and was won by Cork.
