= Mags Darcy =

Irish camogie player

Mags D’Arcy
Personal information
- Native name: Mairead Ni Dorchaí (Irish)
- Born: 2 December 1987 (age 38) County Wexford, Ireland

Sport
- Sport: Camogie
Clubs
- Years: Club
- St Martin's GAA, County Wexford
Inter-county
- Years: County
- 2003 - 2016: Wexford
Inter-county titles
- All-Irelands: 4
- All Stars: 2

Mags D'Arcy is a camogie player from County Wexford. She is a double All Star winner and the holder of four All-Ireland Senior Camogie Championship medals (in 2007, 2010, 2011, 2012). D'Arcy also won three National League titles in 2009, 2010 and 2011. She became part of the Wexford senior camogie team in 2003. At third-level, D'Arcy helped the University College Dublin (UCD) camogie team to bridge a nineteen-year gap to capture back the Ashbourne Cup for two years on the trot in 2007 and 2008. D'Arcy won an Ashbourne All Star award for her performance in the cup. She has also had success in the Poc Fada Camogie Championships, capturing the Leinster title for camogie in 2008 and 2009. In 2014, D'Arcy captained Leinster to a provincial title in the senior Gael Linn Cup. This captaincy came on the back of winning six Leinster Senior Championship's as a part of the Wexford senior camogie team.

At club level, D'Arcy was a member of the St Martin's which captured a first-ever Wexford Senior Camogie title in 2017.
