= Áine Codd =

Irish camogie player

Personal information
- Native name: Áine Ní Choda (Irish)
- Born: Wexford, Ireland

Sport
- Sport: Camogie
- Position: Left corner back
Club*
Years	Club	Apps (scores)
	St Martin’s	?
Inter-county**
Years	County	Apps (scores)
	Wexford	?
Inter-county titles
- All Stars: 1
- * club appearances and scores correct as of (16:31, 30 June 2010 (UTC)). **Inter County team apps and scores correct as of (16:31, 30 June 2010 (UTC)).

Áine Codd is a camogie player, winner of an All-Star award in 2004 and an All Ireland medal in 2007.

== Career ==
She played camogie for Presentation Wexford and was UCD camogie player of the year for 2001. She was nominated for further All Star awards in 2005, 2006 and 2007

== Other Awards ==
She is a daughter of Kit Codd (née Kehoe), former All-Ireland medal winner with Dublin (1965 and 1966) and her native Wexford (1975). Kit also won Gael Linn Cup medals with Leinster in 1965 and 1968, and was on Wexford's first National League-winning team in 1977-'78. Áine's aunts, Bridget, Gretta, Josie and Annie, won All-Ireland Senior medals with Wexford. Two more aunts, Bernie and Eileen, played in All-Ireland finals in the All Ireland Junior and Senior grades. Áine's first cousins include Irish soccer international Kevin Doyle (Bernie's son), current Wexford Senior footballer Kieran Kennedy (Annie's son), and current Wexford Senior hurler Harry Kehoe. In 1996, Áine's brother, Tomás, and brother-in-law, Tom Dempsey, won Winner of All-Ireland Senior medals in hurling medals with Wexford. Her sister, Máire, played with Wexford in the 1992 Winner of All-Ireland Senior medals in camogie final. Áine is married to Monaghan man Micheál McGuinness.
