= Philly Fogarty =

Irish camogie player

Personal information
- Native name: Philomena Ní Fhogartaigh (Irish)
- Born: County Tipperary, Ireland

Sport
- Sport: Camogie
- Position: Right half back
Club*
Years	Club	Apps (scores)
	Cashel	?
Inter-county**
Years	County	Apps (scores)
	Tipperary	?
Inter-county titles
- All Stars: 2
- * club appearances and scores correct as of (16:31, 30 June 2010 (UTC)). **Inter County team apps and scores correct as of (16:31, 30 June 2010 (UTC)).

Philly Fogarty is a camogie player, winner of two All-Star awards in 2006 and 2007. A playing substitute in Tipperary's breakthrough All Ireland victory in 1999, she won All Ireland medals in 1999, 2000, 2001 (when she scored a point in both finals), 2003 and 2004 and scored the point of the final in 2005 when she was on the defeated side. She was also nominated for an earlier All Star award in 2005. She started her career in Rosegreen school before moving to Cashel.
