= Una O'Donoghue =

Irish camogie player

Personal information
- Native name: Úna Ní Dhonnchú (Irish)
- Born: 1982 (age 43–44) Cork, Ireland

Sport
- Sport: Camogie
- Position: Wing forward
Club*
Years	Club	Apps (scores)
2000 – present	Cloughduv	?
Club titles
- Cork titles: 3
Inter-county**
Years	County	Apps (scores)
2000-2009	Cork	?
- * club appearances and scores correct as of (16:31, 30 December 2009 (UTC)). **Inter County team apps and scores correct as of (16:31, 30 December 2009 (UTC)).

Una O'Donoghue born 1981 in Lissarda, County Cork, Ireland is a camogie player, winner of All Ireland camogie medals in 2002, when she was team captain, 2005, 2006, 2008 and 2009. She led her club to their first county Senior championship title in 2001. She is the holder of Ashbourne Cup and league honours with UCC. as well as National League medals with Cork. She has won three county Senior medals in total with her club.

Sporting positions
Preceded by	Cork Senior Camogie Captain; 2002	Succeeded by
Achievements
Preceded by Emily Hayden (Tipperary)	All-Ireland Senior Camogie Final winning captain 2002	Succeeded by Úna O'Dwyer (Tipperary)
