= Renee Fitzgerald =

Camogie player

Personal information
- Native name: Ríona Nic Gearailt (Irish)
- Born: County Cork, Ireland

Sport
- Sport: Camogie
- Position: Full Forward
Club*
Years	Club	Apps (scores)
	Old Aloysius	?
Inter-county**
Years	County	Apps (scores)
	Cork	?
- * club appearances and scores correct as of (16:31, 30 June 2010 (UTC)). **Inter County team apps and scores correct as of (16:31, 30 June 2010 (UTC)).

Renee Fitzgerald is a former camogie player, captain of the All Ireland Camogie Championship winning team in 1939, scoring four of Cork's six goals in the final.

== Career ==
She won a further All Ireland senior medal in 1940, scoring two goals in Cork's 4-1 to 2–2 defeat of Galway. She scored a goal and had another controversially disallowed in Cork's 1942 All Ireland final draw against Dublin, before Cork lost the replay. She reportedly scored six goals in Cork's 11-4 to 1–0 defeat of Limerick in the 1942 Munster final.
