= Orla Cotter =

Camogie player

Personal information
- Native name: Orla Ni Choitir (Irish)
- Born: 1988 (age 37–38) Cork, Ireland

Sport
- Sport: Camogie
- Position: centrefield
Club
- Years: Club
- 2007 – present: St. Catherine’s
Inter-county
- Years: County
- 2006 – present: Cork
Inter-county titles
- All-Irelands: 7
- All Stars: 5

Orla Cotter (born 1988 in Cork) is a Camogie player and student, winner of All-Ireland Camogie medals in 2006, 2008, 2009, 2014, 2015, 2017 and 2018. and Camogie All Star awards in 2008, 2014, 2015, 2016 and 2017. Captained the Cork Minor team in 2006, having won an All-Ireland Under-16 medal three years earlier. She has won two Senior All- Ireland medals and made history in 2006 when she became the first player to collect Senior and Senior 'B' honours in the same year. Orla holds titles with her club from Under-14 to Senior as well as All-Ireland Junior Colleges honours and Senior and Junior National League medals. Her sister, Fiona, was on the Cork Under-16 team in 2008.
