= 2018 All-Ireland Senior Camogie Championship =

Camogie championship

All-Ireland Senior Camogie Championship 2018
Championship details
- Dates: 9 June – 9 September 2018
- Teams: 11

All-Ireland champions
- Winners: Cork (28th win)
- Captain: Aoife Murray
- Manager: Paudie Murray

All-Ireland runners-up
- Runners-up: Kilkenny
- Captain: Shelly Farrell
- Manager: Ann Downey

Championship statistics
- Matches played: 30

The 2018 All-Ireland Senior Camogie Championship – known as the Liberty Insurance Camogie Championship for sponsorship reasons – is the premier inter-county competition of the 2018 camogie season.

The championship began on 9 June and ended on 9 September with Cork retaining the O'Duffy Cup.

== Teams ==
Eleven county teams compete in the Senior Championship. 19 lower-ranked county teams compete in the Intermediate and Junior Championships.

== Format ==
Group Stage

The eleven teams are drawn into two groups of five and six. Each team plays the other teams in their group once. Three points are awarded for a win and one for a draw.

Knock-out stage

- The two group runners-up and the two third-placed teams play in two quarter-finals.
- The two group winners and the two quarter-final winners play in two semi-finals.
- The semi-final winners contest the 2018 All-Ireland Senior Camogie Championship Final

== Group stage ==
Key to colours
Advance to semi-finals
Advance to quarter-finals

=== Group 1 ===
==== Group 1 Table ====
Team	Pld	W	D	L	Diff	Pts
Kilkenny	4	4	0	0	+49	12
Galway	4	3	0	1	+28	9
Waterford	4	2	0	2	–18	6
Limerick	4	0	1	3	–24	1
Clare	4	0	1	3	–35	1

=== Group 2 ===
==== Group 2 Table ====
Team	Pld	W	D	L	Diff	Pts
Cork	5	5	0	0	+95	15
Tipperary	5	3	1	1	+11	10
Dublin	5	3	1	1	0	10
Offaly	5	2	0	3	–12	6
Wexford	5	1	0	4	–15	3
Meath	5	0	0	5	–79	0

== Knock-out stage ==
=== Quarter-finals ===
4 August 2018
5:30 pm
Quarter-Final

Waterford	1-7 – 1-14	Tipperary
	Report

Páirc Uí Chaoimh, Cork
Referee: Owen Elliott (Antrim)
4 August 2018
7 p.m.
Quarter-Final

Galway	0-20 – 0-4	Dublin
A Donohue, C Dolan (fs) 0-4 each; C Cormican, N McGrath (1f) 0-3 each; N Kilkenny 0-2; C Walsh, F Keely, S McGrath 0-1 each	Report	O Beagan 0-3(2fs); A Griffin 0-1

Páirc Uí Chaoimh, Cork
Referee: L Dempsey (Kilkenny)

=== Semi-finals ===
18 August 2018
Semi-Final
17:30 IST

Kilkenny	1-10 – 1-7	Galway
D Gaule 0-6f; K Power 1-1; J Malone 0-1; M Quilty, M Farrell 0-1 each	Report	C Dolan 0-5f; R Hennelly 1-0 (pen); N Kilkenny, A O’Reilly 0-1 each

Semple Stadium, Thurles
Referee: R Kelly (Kildare)

18 August 2018
Semi-Final
19:15 IST

Cork	0-21 – 0-9	Tipperary
Cotter 0-9 (7fs); C Sigerson, K Mackey 0-3 each; L Collins 0-2; A O’Connor, O Cronin, L Homan, P Mackey 0-1 each	Report	C Devane 0-5f; Caoimhe Maher, O O’Dwyer, G O’Brien, S Fryday 0-1 each

Semple Stadium, Thurles
Referee: E Cassidy (Derry)

=== Final ===
9 September 2018
16:15 IST

Kilkenny	0-13 – 0-14	Cork
Denise Gaule 0-10 (7f, 2 '65'); Julia Ann Malone, Meghan Farrell, Michelle Quilty 0-1 each	Report	Orla Cotter 0-5f; Chloe Sigerson 0-3f; Katrina Mackey, Orla Cronin 0-2 each; Aoife Murray (pen), Amy O’Connor 0-1 each

Croke Park, Dublin
Attendance: 21,453
Referee: Eamon Cassidy (Derry)
