= Barryroe GAA =

Gaelic games club in County Cork, Ireland

Barryroe
- Barra Rua
- Founded: 1892
- County: Cork
- Nickname: Blues
- Colours
- Grounds: Páirc Uí Mhurchú
- Coordinates: 51°36′22.84″N 8°44′13.22″W

Playing kits
Standard colours

Barryoe GAA Club is a Gaelic Athletic Association club in Barryroe, County Cork, Ireland. The club is affiliated to the Carbery Board and fields teams in both hurling and Gaelic football.

== History ==
Located in the parish of Barryroe, about 16km from Clonakilty, Barryroe GAA Club was established in 1892. The club draws its players from the villages of Courtmacsherry, Butlerstown, Lislevane and surrounding areas. The club has spent the majority of its existence operating in the junior grade and, like many other clubs, has also seen various periods of inactivity. The club was reformed in 1961.

Barryroe made their hurling breakthrough in 1981 when the South West JAHC title was won for the first time. The club has won seven divisional titles in all, between that initial success in 1981 and 2007. The last of these was subsequently converted into a Cork JAHC title after a 2-19 to 2-13 defeat of Chareville in the final. Barryroe were later beaten by Moyle Rovers in the 2007 Munster Club JHC final.

Barryroe made a Gaelic football breakthrough in 2023 when the club beat Kilmacabea by 1–12 to 0–14 to win the Carbery JAFC title for the first time in their history.

== Notable players ==
- Robbie Kiely: Munster SFC-winner (2020)
- Danny Murphy: All-Ireland SHC-winner (1999)
- Jennifer O'Leary: All-Ireland SCC-winner (2002, 2005, 2006, 2014)

== Honours ==
- Cork Senior Camogie Championship: Runners-Up: 2000
- Munster Junior Club Hurling Championship: Runners-Up: 2007
- Cork Junior A Hurling Championship: Winners (1) 2007 Runners Up 1994 Semi Finalists 1986, 2006
- Cork Junior B Football Championship Winners (1) 2002
- Cork Minor B Hurling Championship: Beaten Finalists 2005
- Cork Minor B Football Championship: Winners (1) 2000, Runners-Up 1999
- Cork Minor C Football Championship: Winners (1) 2005
- West Cork Junior A Hurling Championship: Winners (7) 1981, 1982, 1986, 1987, 1994, 2006, 2007 Runners Up 1985, 1992, 1996, 1999, 2000, 2002
- West Cork Junior A Football Championship: Winners (1) 2023 Runners-Up: 1980, 1994, 2003
- West Cork Junior B Hurling Championship: Winners (3) 1933, 1953, 2007 Runners-Up: 1950, 1964, 1974, 1977,
- South West Cork Junior B Football Championship: Winners (5) 1964, 1979, 1989, 1998, 2002 Runners-Up: 1944, 1967, 1976, 1988
- South West Cork Junior C Hurling Championship: Winners (3) 1987, 1992, 2004 Runners-Up 1985, 1986,
- West Cork Junior D Football Championship: Runners-Up 2002
- West Cork Minor A Hurling Championship: Winners (7) 1977, 1978, 1983, 1986, 1988, 1989, 2001 Runners-Up 1979, 1980, 1984, 1990, 1994, 1999, 2000, 2006
- West Cork Minor B Hurling Championship: Winners (6) 1968, 1976, 1977, 1978, 1979, 1980 Runners-Up 1970
- West Cork Minor B Football Championship Winners (2) 1999, 2000
- West Cork Minor C Football Championship Winners (1) 2005
- West Cork Minor D Football Championship Winners (2) 2008, 2009
- West Cork Under-21 A Hurling Championship Winners (5) 1980, 1981, 1985, 1988, 1990 Runners-Up: 1978,1983, 1986, 1989, 1991, 2003
- West Cork Under-21 B Hurling Championship Winners (3) 1976, 1977, 2006 Runners-Up: 1973, 1974
- West Cork Under-21 B Football Championship Winners (3) 1987, 1988, 1989 Runners-Up: 1978, 1985, 1995
- West Cork Under-21 C Football Championship Runners-Up 2011
