= Milford GAA (Cork) =

Gaelic games club in County Cork, Ireland

Milford
- Áth an Mhuillinn
- County: Cork
- Colours
- Grounds: Páirc Mhic Ghiobúin
- Coordinates: 52°20′28″N 8°51′08″W

Playing kits
Standard colours

Senior Club Championships
	All Ireland	Munster champions	Cork champions
Hurling:	0	0	0
Camogie:	3	4	4

Milford GAA is a Gaelic Athletic Association club located in Milford, County Cork, Ireland. The club is affiliated to the Avondhu Board and the Cork County Board. Milford fields teams in hurling and camogie, while the club's Gaelic football team plays under the name Milford Deel Rovers, a name derived from the River Deel.

== History ==
Located in the village of Milford, on the Cork-Limerick border, the exact foundation date of Milford GAA Club is unknown. In spite of this, records indicate that a club existed in the decades following the establishment of the GAA in 1884. Milford has spent the majority of its existence operating in the junior grade and were the inaugural winners of the North Cork JHC title in 1926. The club have won five such titles in total, while two North Cork JFC titles have been won, under the Deel Rovers banner.

Milford's Cork U21HC success in 1978 kickstarted a successful period at adult level for the club. The Cork JHC title was won in 1981, following a 1–10 to 0–11 defeat of St Catherine's in the final. A second consecutive promotion and senior status followed in 1982, when Milford won the Cork IHC title after a 4–07 to 1–05 win over Erin's Own.

Milford Camogie club was established in January 1997 and made steady progress with a number of lower grade success. The club won four consecutive Cork SCC titles between 2012 and 2015. These were subsequently converted into four consecutive Munster Club SCC titles. Milford also won three All-Ireland Club SCC titles at this time.

== Honours ==
=== Men ===
- Cork Intermediate Hurling Championship (1): 1982
- Cork Junior Hurling Championship (1): 1981
- North Cork Junior A Football Championship (2): 1981, 1991
- North Cork Junior A Hurling Championship (5): 1926, 1933, 1935, 1936, 1981
- Cork Under-21 Hurling Championship (1): 1978
- Cork Minor C Hurling Championship (1): 1995

=== Women ===
- All-Ireland Senior Club Camogie Championship (3): 2013, 2014, 2016
- Munster Senior Club Camogie Championship (4): 2012, 2013, 2014, 2015
- Cork Senior Camogie Championship (4): 2012, 2013, 2014, 2015

== Notable players ==
- Pat Buckley: All-Ireland SHC-winner (1990)
- Anna Geary: All-Ireland SCC-winner (2005, 2006, 2009, 2014)
- Seán O'Gorman: All-Ireland SHC-winner (1990)
- Ashling Thompson: All-Ireland SCC-winner (2014, 2015, 2017, 2018, 2023, 2024, 2026)
