= Josie McGrath =

Personal information
- Native name: Seosaimhín Níc Craith (Irish)
- Born: County Cork, Ireland

Sport
- Sport: Camogie
- Position: forward
Club*
| Years | Club | Apps (scores) |
| | Old Aloysius | ? |
Inter-county**
| Years | County | Apps (scores) |
| | Cork | ? |
Inter-county titles
- All-Irelands: 4
- * club appearances and scores correct as of (16:31, 30 June 2010 (UTC)). **Inter County team apps and scores correct as of (16:31, 30 June 2010 (UTC)).

Josephine ‘Josie’ McGrath is a former camogie player, three times All Ireland medalist and captain of the All Ireland Camogie Championship winning team in 1935. She won three further All Ireland senior medals in 1934, 1936, when she scored the fifth of Cork's six goals, and 1939.

== Career ==
A member of the powerful Old Aloysius she won several county championships in Cork. Her daughter Deirdre Young played camogie for Cork and Munster.
