= 2015 All-Ireland Senior Camogie Championship =

Camogie championship

All-Ireland Senior Camogie Championship 2015
Championship details
- Dates: 20 June – 13 September 2015
- Teams: 10

All-Ireland champions
- Winners: Cork (26th win)
- Captain: Ashling Thompson
- Manager: Paudie Murray

All-Ireland runners-up
- Runners-up: Galway
- Captain: Niamh Kilkenny
- Manager: Tony Ward

Championship statistics
- Matches played: 26

The 2015 All-Ireland Senior Camogie Championship—known as the Liberty Insurance All-Ireland Senior Camogie Championship for sponsorship reasons— is the premier competition of the 2015 camogie season. Ten county teams compete in the Senior Championship out of twenty-seven who compete overall in the Senior, Intermediate and Junior Championships. It commenced on 20 June.

== Format ==
The ten teams are drawn into two groups of five teams. All the teams play each other once, scoring two points for a win and one for a draw.

In the two quarter-finals, 2nd in Group A plays 3rd in Group B and 3rd in Group A plays 2nd inGroup B..

The two group winners and the two quarter-final winners play in the semi-finals.

The semi-final winners contest the 2015 All-Ireland Senior Camogie Championship Final

== Fixtures and results ==
=== Group stages ===
Key to colours
Advance to semi-finals
Advance to quarter-finals

==== Group 1 ====
Team	Pld	W	D	L	F	A	Diff	Pts
Galway	4	4	0	0	70	41	29	8
Wexford	4	3	0	1	60	48	12	6
Cork	4	2	0	2	52	46	6	4
Limerick	4	1	0	3	51	74	-23	2
Offaly	4	0	0	4	41	65	-24	0

==== Group 2 ====
Team	Pld	W	D	L	F	A	Diff	Pts
Kilkenny	4	4	0	0	135	36	+96	8
Tipperary	4	3	0	1	65	85	–20	6
Dublin	4	1	1	2	51	57	–6	3
Clare	4	1	1	2	59	72	–13	3
Derry	4	0	0	4	53	110	–57	0

As stated in the rules, it was originally planned that a coin toss would take place to decide which of Dublin and Clare would progress to the quarter-finals. The head-to-head match between them had ended in a 1-8 to 1-8 draw and competition rules meant that they were level in the group. Both teams withdrew in protest at the proposed coin toss and eventually the Camogie Association decided that a play-off match would take place instead.

1 August 2015
Group 2 Play-Off Match
2pm

Dublin	1-11 - 0-12	Clare

Semple Stadium, Thurles

=== Knock-Out Stages ===
==== Quarter-finals ====
1 August 2015
Quarter-Final
4pm

Cork	2-17 - 0-10	Tipperary

Semple Stadium, Thurles

3 August 2015
Quarter-Final
3pm

Wexford	0-13 - 1-7	Dublin

Netwatch Cullen Park, Carlow

==== Semi-finals ====
15 August 2015
Semi-Final
3:30pm

Galway	1-14 - 2-10	Wexford

Nowlan Park, Kilkenny

16 August 2015
Semi-Final
4pm

Kilkenny	1-10 - 4-10	Cork

Walsh Park, Waterford

==== All-Ireland final ====
13 September 2015
Final
4pm

Cork	1-13 - 0-9	Galway
O Cotter 0-7 (0-5 frees); B Corkery (1-1); A Thompson (0-2); K Mackey, A O’Connor, O Cronin (0-1 each).	Report	N McGrath (0-8, 0-7 frees); A Donoghue (0-1).

Croke Park, Dublin
Attendance: 16,610
Referee: Ray Kelly (Kildare)

Preceded by All-Ireland Senior Camogie Championship 2014	All-Ireland Senior Camogie Championship; 1932 – present	Succeeded by All-Ireland Senior Camogie Championship 2016
