= Cathriona Foley =

Camogie player

Personal information
- Native name: Caitríona Ní Fhoghlú (Irish)
- Born: 1986 (age 39–40) Cork, Ireland

Sport
- Sport: Camogie
- Position: full-back
Club*
Years	Club	Apps (scores)
1997 – present	Rockbán	?
Club titles
- Cork titles: 3
Inter-county**
Years	County	Apps (scores)
2002-2010	Cork	?
Inter-county titles
- All-Irelands: 4
- All Stars: 3
- * club appearances and scores correct as of (16:31, 30 December 2009 (UTC)). **Inter County team apps and scores correct as of (16:31, 30 December 2009 (UTC)).

Cathriona Foley (born 1986 in Cork) is a lecturer in University College Cork and camogie player and winner of All Ireland medals in 2005, 2006, 2008 and 2009. She won All Star awards in 2007, 2008 and 2009. Cathriona captained Cork to the All-Ireland Senior title in 2008 and is also the holder of an All-Ireland Minor medal as well as provincial honours at Minor, Junior, Intermediate and Senior. Holds a Junior 'B', Junior 'A' and Senior 'B' county championship medal with her club and won a Senior 'A' championship title while captaining divisional side Muskerry in 2007. Her father, Dan Joe, won a minor hurling All-Ireland with Cork. Cathriona is the holder of All Star awards and has lined out with UCC in the Ashbourne Cup. Sisters Mairéad and Colleen and brother Daniel wore the Cork colours at under-age level.
