= Camogie All Stars Awards =

Annual camogie awards

The Camogie All Star Awards are awarded every year to players of the Irish stick and ball team sport of camogie, picked in the 15 traditional positions on the field of play: that is, goalkeeper, three full-backs, three half-backs, two midfields, three half-forwards and three full-forwards.

The scheme originated as an independent initiative sponsored by a hotel group, and those picks were made in 2003. The Camogie Association became involved in 2004. O'Neill's are the present title sponsors of the awards.

The leading awards winner is Gemma O'Connor of Cork with eleven awards. A prize for Manager of the Year is also given as part of the Camogie All Stars Awards. The reigning 2024 Manager of the Year is Ger Manley of Cork, who led his team to the 2024 All-Ireland Senior Camogie Championship.

== Past winners ==
=== 2000s ===
==== 2004 ====
Pos.	Player	Team	# of All Stars
GK	Aoife Murray	Cork	1
RCB	Suzanne Kelly	Tipperary	1
FB	Una O'Dwyer	Tipperary	1
LCB	Áine Codd	Wexford	1
RWB	Mary Leacy	Wexford	1
CB	Ciara Gaynor	Tipperary	1
LWB	Therese Brophy	Tipperary	1
MD	Kate Kelly	Wexford	1
MD	Gemma O'Connor	Cork	1
RWF	Jennifer O'Leary	Cork	1
CF	Maureen McAleenan	Down	1
LWF	Clare Grogan	Tipperary	1
RCF	Anne-Marie Hayes	Galway	1
FF	Deirdre Hughes	Tipperary	1
LCF	Sinéad Millea	Kilkenny	1

List of nominees

==== 2005 ====
Pos.	Player	Team	# of All Stars
GK	Jovita Delaney	Tipperary	1
RCB	Sinéad Cahalan	Galway	1
FB	Catherine O'Loughlin	Wexford	1
LCB	Julie Kirwan	Tipperary	1
RWB	Anna Geary	Cork	1
CB	Mary O'Connor	Cork	1
LWB	Therese Maher	Galway	1
MD	Gemma O'Connor	Cork	2
MD	Cara Lucey	Dublin	1
RWF	Jennifer O'Leary	Cork	2
CF	Rachel Maloney	Cork	1
LWF	Clare Grogan	Tipperary	2
RCF	Eimear McDonnell	Tipperary	1
FF	Catherine O'Loughlin	Clare	1
LCF	Emer Dillon	Cork	1

List of nominees

==== 2006 ====
Pos.	Player	Team	# of All Stars
GK	Jovita Delaney	Tipperary	2
RCB	Regina McGlynn	Galway	1
FB	Suzanne Kelly	Tipperary	2
LCB	Rena Buckley	Cork	1
RWB	Philly Fogarty	Tipperary	1
CB	Mary O'Connor	Cork	2
LWB	Anna Geary	Cork	2
MD	Gemma O'Connor	Cork	3
MD	Kate Kelly	Wexford	2
RWF	Joanne Ryan	Tipperary	1
CF	Briege Corkery	Cork	1
LWF	Jennifer O'Leary	Cork	3
RCF	Imelda Kennedy	Kilkenny	1
FF	Laoise O'Hara	Dublin	1
LCF	Veronica Curtin	Galway	1

List of nominees

==== 2007 ====
Pos.	Player	Team	# of All Stars
GK	Mags D'arcy	Wexford	1
RCB	Emer Branigan	Dublin	1
FB	Catherine O'Loughlin	Wexford	2
LCB	Rosie Collins	Limerick	1
RWB	Rena Buckley	Cork	2
CB	Mary Leacy	Wexford	2
LWB	Cathriona Foley	Cork	1
MD	Gemma O'Connor	Cork	4
MD	Philly Fogarty	Tipperary	2
RWF	Veronica Curtin	Galway	2
CF	Aisling Diamond	Derry	1
LWF	Jennifer O'Leary	Cork	4
RCF	Kate Kelly	Wexford	3
FF	Clare Grogan	Tipperary	3
LCF	Una Leacy	Wexford	1

List of nominees

==== 2008 ====
Pos.	Player	Team	# of All Stars
GK	Aoife Murray	Cork	2
RCB	Cathriona Foley	Cork	2
FB	Catherine O'Loughlin	Wexford	3
LCB	Trish O'Halloran	Tipperary	1
RWB	Michaela Morgan	Offaly	1
CB	Sinéad Cahalan	Galway	2
LWB	Gemma O'Connor	Cork	5
MD	Briege Corkery	Cork	2
MD	Orla Cotter	Cork	1
RWF	Jessica Gill	Galway	1
CF	Therese Maher	Galway	2
LWF	Aoife Neary	Kilkenny	1
RCF	Sile Burns	Cork	1
FF	Rachel Maloney	Cork	2
LCF	Jane Adams	Antrim	1

List of nominees

==== 2009 ====
Pos.	Player	Team	# of All Stars
GK	Aoife Murray	Cork	3
RCB	Regina McGlynn	Galway	2
FB	Cathriona Foley	Cork	3
LCB	Jacqui Frisby	Kilkenny	1
RWB	Anne-Marie Hayes	Galway	2
CB	Mary O'Connor	Cork	3
LWB	Elaine Aylward	Kilkenny	1
MD	Briege Corkery	Cork	3
MD	Ann Dalton	Kilkenny	1
RWF	Katie Power	Kilkenny	1
CF	Gemma O'Connor	Cork	6
LWF	Therese Maher	Galway	3
RCF	Aoife Neary	Kilkenny	2
FF	Gráinne McGoldrick	Derry	1
LCF	Rachel Maloney	Cork	3

List of nominees

=== 2010s ===
==== 2010 ====
Pos.	Player	Team	# of All Stars
GK	Mags D'arcy	Wexford	1
RCB	Claire O'Connor	Wexford	1
FB	Catherine O'Loughlin	Wexford	4
LCB	Niamh Kilkenny	Galway	1
RWB	Regina McGlynn	Galway	3
CB	Mary Leacy	Wexford	3
LWB	Anna Geary	Cork	3
MD	Orla Kilkenny	Galway	1
MD	Ann Dalton	Kilkenny	2
RWF	Kate Kelly	Wexford	4
CF	Una Leacy	Wexford	2
LWF	Berda Hanney	Galway	1
RCF	Katrina Parrock	Wexford	1
FF	Ursula Jacob	Wexford	1
LCF	Aislinn Connolly	Galway	1

List of nominees

==== 2011 ====
Pos.	Player	Team	# of All Stars
GK	Susan Earner	Galway	1
RCB	Claire O'Connor	Wexford	2
FB	Catherine O'Loughlin	Wexford	5
LCB	Lorraine Ryan	Galway	1
RWB	Anne-Marie Hayes	Galway	3
CB	Therese Maher	Galway	4
LWB	Anna Geary	Cork	4
MD	Niamh Kilkenny	Galway	2
MD	Jill Horan	Tipperary	1
RWF	Kate Kelly	Wexford	5
CF	Una Leacy	Wexford	3
LWF	Jennifer O'Leary	Cork	5
RCF	Katrina Parrock	Wexford	2
FF	Ursula Jacob	Wexford	2
LCF	Berda Hanney	Galway	2

List of nominees

==== 2012 ====
Pos.	Player	Team	# of All Stars
GK	Aoife Murray	Cork	4
RCB	Claire O'Connor	Wexford	3
FB	Catherine O'Loughlin	Wexford	6
LCB	Sheila O'Sullivan	Offaly	1
RWB	Pamela Mackey	Cork	1
CB	Gemma O'Connor	Cork	7
LWB	Deirde Codd	Wexford	1
MD	Niamh Kilkenny	Galway	3
MD	Jennifer O'Leary	Cork	6
RWF	Kate Kelly	Wexford	6
CF	Niamh McGrath	Galway	1
LWF	Briege Corkery	Cork	4
RCF	Katriona Mackey	Cork	1
FF	Ursula Jacob	Wexford	3
LCF	Katrina Parrock	Wexford	3

List of nominees

==== 2013 ====
Pos.	Player	Team	# of All Stars
GK	Susan Earner	Galway	2
RCB	Mairead Power	Kilkenny	1
FB	Sarah Dervan	Galway	1
LCB	Lorraine Ryan	Galway	2
RWB	Edwina Keane	Kilkenny	1
CB	Therese Maher	Galway	5
LWB	Chloe Morey	Clare	1
MD	Niamh Kilkenny	Galway	4
MD	Jennifer O'Leary	Cork	7
RWF	Katie Power	Kilkenny	2
CF	Niamh McGrath	Galway	2
LWF	Kate Kelly	Wexford	7
RCF	Shelly Farrell	Kilkenny	1
FF	Elaine Darmody	Offaly	1
LCF	Ailish O'Reilly	Galway	1

List of nominees

==== 2014 ====
Pos.	Player	Team	# of All Stars
GK	Aoife Murray	Cork	5
RCB	Joanne O'Callaghan	Cork	1
FB	Máire McGrath	Clare	1
LCB	Sarah Dervan	Galway	2
RWB	Emer O’Sullivan	Cork	1
CB	Gemma O'Connor	Cork	8
LWB	Collette Dormer	Kilkenny	1
MD	Rena Buckley	Cork	3
MD	Ann Dalton	Kilkenny	3
RWF	Jennifer O'Leary	Cork	8
CF	Orla Cotter	Cork	2
LWF	Briege Corkery	Cork	5
RCF	Michelle Quilty	Kilkenny	1
FF	Ursula Jacob	Wexford	4
LCF	Katriona Mackey	Cork	2

List of nominees

==== 2015 ====
Pos.	Player	Team	# of All Stars
GK	Aoife Murray	Cork	6
RCB	Pamela Mackey	Cork	2
FB	Sarah Dervan	Galway	3
LCB	Heather Cooney	Galway	1
RWB	Rena Buckley	Cork	4
CB	Gemma O'Connor	Cork	9
LWB	Lorraine Ryan	Galway	3
MD	Niamh Kilkenny	Galway	5
MD	Ashling Thompson	Cork	1
RWF	Orla Cotter	Cork	3
CF	Niamh McGrath	Galway	3
LWF	Kate Kelly	Wexford	8
RCF	Briege Corkery	Cork	6
FF	Molly Dunne	Galway	1
LCF	Ailish O'Reilly	Galway	2

List of nominees

==== 2016 ====
Pos.	Player	Team	# of All Stars
GK	Emma Kavanagh	Kilkenny	1
RCB	Pamela Mackey	Cork	3
FB	Sarah Dervan	Galway	4
LCB	Collette Dormer	Kilkenny	2
RWB	Rebecca Henelly	Galway	1
CB	Ann Dalton	Kilkenny	4
LWB	Meighan Farrell	Kilkenny	1
MD	Orla Cotter	Cork	4
MD	Miriam Walsh	Kilkenny	1
RWF	Denise Gaule	Kilkenny	1
CF	Julieanne Malone	Kilkenny	1
LWF	Aoife Donohue	Galway	1
RCF	Michelle Quilty	Kilkenny	2
FF	Kate Kelly	Wexford	9
LCF	Katriona Mackey	Cork	3

List of nominees

==== 2017 ====
Pos.	Player	Team	# of All Stars
GK	Aoife Murray	Cork	7
RCB	Rena Buckley	Cork	5
FB	Catherine Foley	Kilkenny	1
LCB	Laura Treacy	Cork	1
RWB	Gemma O'Connor	Cork	10
CB	Ann Dalton	Kilkenny	5
LWB	Emer O'Sullivan	Cork	2
MD	Meighan Farrell	Kilkenny	2
MD	Ashling Thompson	Cork	2
RWF	Katriona Mackey	Cork	4
CF	Katie Power	Kilkenny	3
LWF	Orla Cotter	Cork	5
RCF	Ailish O'Reilly	Galway	3
FF	Aisling Maher	Dublin	1
LCF	Aoife Donohue	Galway	2

List of nominees

==== 2018 ====
Pos.	Player	Team	# of All Stars
GK	Aoife Murray	Cork	8
RCB	Grace Walsh	Kilkenny	1
FB	Sarah Dervan	Galway	5
LCB	Pamela Mackey	Cork	4
RWB	Hannah Looney	Cork	1
CB	Ann Dalton	Kilkenny	6
LWB	Chloe Sigerson	Cork	1
MD	Gemma O'Connor	Cork	11
MD	Meighan Farrell	Kilkenny	3
RWF	Orla Cotter	Cork	6
CF	Katie Power	Kilkenny	4
LWF	Denise Gaule	Kilkenny	2
RCF	Katriona Mackey	Cork	5
FF	Cáit Devane	Tipperary	1
LCF	Beth Carton	Waterford	1

List of nominees

==== 2019 ====
Pos.	Player	Team	# of All Stars
GK	Sarah Healy	Galway	1
RCB	Shauna Healy	Galway	1
FB	Sarah Dervan	Galway	6
LCB	Edwina Keane	Kilkenny	2
RWB	Heather Cooney	Galway	2
CB	Clare Phelan	Kilkenny	1
LWB	Lorraine Bray	Waterford	1
MD	Aoife Donohue	Galway	3
MD	Niamh Kilkenny	Galway	6
RWF	Niamh Mulcahy	Limerick	1
CF	Denise Gaule	Kilkenny	3
LWF	Amy O'Connor	Cork	1
RCF	Michelle Quilty	Kilkenny	3
FF	Ailish O'Reilly	Galway	4
LCF	Beth Carton	Waterford	2

List of nominees

=== 2020s ===
==== 2020 ====
Pos.	Player	Team	# of All Stars
GK	Áine Slattery	Tipperary	1
RCB	Shauna Healy	Galway	2
FB	Clare Phelan	Kilkenny	2
LCB	Mary Ryan	Tipperary	1
RWB	Hannah Looney	Cork	2
CB	Karen Kennedy	Tipperary	1
LWB	Davina Tobin	Kilkenny	1
MD	Chloe Sigerson	Cork	2
MD	Grace Walsh	Kilkenny	2
RWF	Niamh Rocket	Waterford	1
CF	Orlaith Cronin	Cork	1
LWF	Denise Gaule	Kilkenny	4
RCF	Orla McGrath	Galway	1
FF	Miriam Walsh	Kilkenny	2
LCF	Ann Dalton	Kilkenny	7

==== 2021 ====
Pos.	Player	Team	# of All Stars
GK	Sarah Healy	Galway	2
RCB	Shauna Healy	Galway	3
FB	Sarah Dervan	Galway	7
LCB	Davina Tóibín	Kilkenny	2
RWB	Megan Farrell	Kilkenny	4
CB	Laura Treacy	Cork	2
LWB	Laura Hayes	Cork	1
MD	Niamh Kilkenny	Galway	7
MD	Hannah Looney	Cork	3
RWF	Aoife Donohue	Galway	4
CF	Katie Nolan	Kilkenny	1
LWF	Denise Gaule	Kilkenny	5
RCF	Siobhan McGrath	Galway	1
FF	Orla McGrath	Galway	2
LCF	Ailish O'Reilly	Galway	5

==== 2022 ====
Pos.	Player	Team	# of All Stars
GK	Aoife Norris	Kilkenny	1
RCB	Libby Coppinger	Cork	1
FB	Grace Walsh	Kilkenny	3
LCB	Shauna Healy	Galway	4
RWB	Laura Murphy	Kilkenny	1
CB	Clare Phelan	Kilkenny	3
LWB	Saoirse McCarthy	Cork	1
MD	Ashling Thompson	Cork	3
MD	Lorraine Bray	Waterford	2
RWF	Denise Gaule	Kilkenny	6
CF	Beth Carton	Waterford	3
LWF	Julianne Malone	Kilkenny	2
RCF	Katie Nolan	Kilkenny	2
FF	Miriam Walsh	Kilkenny	3
LCF	Katriona Mackey	Cork	6

==== 2023 ====
Pos.	Player	Team	# of All Stars
GK	Amy Lee	Cork	1
RCB	Vicki Falconer	Waterford	1
FB	Libby Coppinger	Cork	2
LCB	Roisin Black	Galway	1
RWB	Karen Kennedy	Tipperary	2
CB	Laura Treacy	Cork	3
LWB	Meabh Cahalane	Cork	1
MD	Saoirse McCarthy	Cork	2
MD	Lorraine Bray	Waterford	3
RWF	Hannah Looney	Cork	4
CF	Beth Carton	Waterford	4
LWF	Denise Gaule	Kilkenny	7
RCF	Amy O'Connor	Cork	2
FF	Katriona Mackey	Cork	7
LCF	Cáit Devane	Tipperary	2

==== 2024 ====
Pos.	Player	Team	# of All Stars
GK	Amy Lee	Cork	2
RCB	Dervla Higgins	Galway	1
FB	Roisin Black	Galway	2
LCB	Pamela Mackey	Cork	5
RWB	Laura Hayes	Cork	2
CB	Laura Treacy	Cork	4
LWB	Claire Gannon	Dublin	1
MD	Ashling Thompson	Cork	4
MD	Aoife Donohue	Galway	5
RWF	Saoirse McCarthy	Cork	3
CF	Karen Kennedy	Tipperary	3
LWF	Carrie Dolan	Galway	1
RCF	Niamh Mallon	Galway	1
FF	Katriona Mackey	Cork	8
LCF	Amy O'Connor	Cork	3

==== 2025 ====
Pos.	Player	Team	# of All Stars
GK	Sarah Healy	Galway	3
RCB	Shauna Healy	Galway	5
FB	Libby Coppinger	Cork	3
LCB	Dervla Higgins	Galway	2
RWB	Mairéad Eviston	Tipperary	1
CB	Ciara Hickey	Galway	1
LWB	Laura Hayes	Cork	3
MD	Aoife Donohue	Galway	6
MD	Ashling Thompson	Cork	5
RWF	Saoirse McCarthy	Cork	4
CF	Beth Carton	Waterford	5
LWF	Ailish O'Reilly	Galway	6
RCF	Niamh Mallon	Galway	2
FF	Carrie Dolan	Galway	2
LCF	Amy O'Connor	Cork	4

==== Unofficial 2003 picks ====
They were not All Stars, but referred to as "lynchpin". This was an independent initiative, sponsored by a hotel group.

Jovita Delaney (Tipperary), Rosie Collins (Limerick), Una O'Dwyer (Tipperary), Stephanie Dunlea (Cork), Mary O'Connor (Cork), Ciara Gaynor (Tipperary), Therese Brophy (Tipperary), Vera Sheehan (Limerick), Jane Adams (Antrim), Emer Dillon (Cork), Clare Grogan (Tipperary), Eileen O'Brien (Limerick), Emer O'Donnell (Tipperary), Deidre Hughes (Tipperary), Fiona O'Driscoll (Cork)

Note that three of the players (Dunlea, O'Driscoll and Sheehan) never got an All Star. It took Mary O'Connor until 2006 to get one. It took Collins until 2007 to get hers, while it took Jane Adam until 2008 to get hers.

=== Manager of the Year ===
- 2005 John Cronin (Cork)
- 2006 Peter Lucey (Dublin)
- 2007 Liam Dunne (Wexford)
- 2008 Stephen Dormer (Kilkenny)
- 2009 Noel Finn (Galway)
- 2010 Joachim Kelly (Offaly)
- 2011 JJ Doyle (Wexford)
- 2012 JJ Doyle (Wexford)
- 2013 Tony Ward (Galway)
- 2014 Joe Quaid (Limerick)
- 2015 Paudie Murray (Cork)
- 2016 Paudie Murray (Cork)
- 2017 Paudie Murray (Cork)
- 2018 Paudie Murray (Cork)
- 2019 Cathal Murray (Galway)
- 2020 Brian Dowling (Kilkenny)
- 2021 Cathal Murray (Galway)
- 2022 Brian Dowling (Kilkenny)
- 2023 Matthew Twomey (Cork)
- 2024 Ger Manley (Cork)
- 2025 Cathal Murray (Galway)

== Other awards ==
=== Player of the Year ===
This has had various sponsors.

The Irish Independent sports star of the week, selected by newspaper sports staff, was traditionally accorded to a camogie player once each year on the week of the All-Ireland final. Annual Cúchulainn All Star awards were introduced as part of the first Gaelic Weekly All star awards scheme, initiated by a group of sportswriters led by Mick Dunne and awarded on the same selectorial basis as the Gaelic football and hurling All Stars are today, though without a major sponsor. They were awarded to two camogie players in 1964–7, reduced to one in 1968–9. The camogie selectors for 1964 were Maeve Gilroy, Kathleen Mills and Lil O'Grady, and those of 1965 were Kathleen O'Duffy, Síghle Nic an Ultaigh and Eithne Neville. In the 1970s, the GAA Player of the month scheme, awarded one of its monthly awards, usually in November, to a camogie player. The scheme, initiated by sports journalist and historian David Guiney and also selected by sportswriters, became an effective player of the year award under three successive sponsors, B+I Line, Irish Nationwide and Eircell. The camogie player of the year was revived as part of the Powerscreen all star award scheme in and an official player of the year award was introduced in 2005.

- 1963 Úna O'Connor (Dublin)
- 1963 Deidre Sutton (Cork)
- 1964 Alice Hussey (Dublin)
- 1964 Theresa Murphy (Cork)
- 1965 (Joint) Mairéad McAtamney (Antrim)
- 1965 (Joint) Clare Hanrahan (Kilkenny)
- 1966 (Joint) Mary Conroy (Kilkenny)
- 1966 (Joint) Maeve Gilroy (Antrim)
- 1967 Úna O'Connor (Dublin)
- 1968 Margaret O'Leary (Wexford)
- 1973 Marie Costine (Cork)
- 1974 Helena Uí Neill (Kilkenny)
- 1975 Brigit Doyle (Wexford)
- 1976 Angela Downey (Kilkenny)
- 1977 Bridie Martin (Kilkenny)
- 1978 Pat Moloney (Cork)
- 1979 Mairéad McAtamney (Antrim)
- 1980 Marian McCarthy (Cork)
- 1981 Liz Neary (Kilkenny)
- 1982 Mary O'Leary (Cork)
- 1983 Clare Cronin (Cork)
- 1984 Yvonne Redmond (Dublin)
- 1985 Angela Downey (Kilkenny)
- 1986 Ann Downey & Angela Downey (Kilkenny)
- 1987 Breda Holmes (Kilkenny)
- 1988 Biddy O'Sullivan (Kilkenny)
- 1989 Ann Downey & Angela Downey (Kilkenny)
- 1991 Ann Downey (Kilkenny)
- 1992 Sandie Fitzgibbon (Cork)
- 1993 Linda Mellerick (Cork)
- 1995 Sandie Fitzgibbon (Cork)
- 1998 Linda Mellerick (Cork)
- 1999 Deirdre Hughes (Tipperary)
- 2000 Jovita Delaney (Tipperary)
- 2001 Ciara Gaynor (Tipperary)
- 2002 Fiona O'Driscoll (Cork)
- 2005 Gemma O'Connor (Cork)
- 2006 Mary O'Connor (Cork)
- 2007 Kate Kelly (Wexford)
- 2008 Aoife Murray (Cork)
- 2009 Ann Dalton (Kilkenny)
- 2015 Gemma O'Connor (Cork)
- 2016 Denise Gaule (Kilkenny)
- 2017 Rena Buckley (Cork)
- 2018 Ann Dalton (Kilkenny)
- 2019 Niamh Kilkenny (Galway)
- 2020 Denise Gaule (Kilkenny)
- 2021 Aoife Donohue (Galway)
- 2022 Miriam Walsh (Kilkenny)
- 2023 Beth Carton (Waterford)
- 2024 Laura Hayes (Cork)
- 2025 Aoife Donohue (Galway)

=== Texaco Award ===
This is selected by the sports editors of national newspapers in 10 nominated sports each year. Camogie has been chosen on six occasions.

- 1966 Úna O'Connor (Dublin)
- 1967 Sue Cashman (Antrim)
- 1986 Angela Downey (Kilkenny)
- 2003 Eimear McDonnell (Tipperary)
- 2004 Una O'Dwyer (Tipperary)
- 2008 Briege Corkery (Cork)

=== Non-senior awards ===
==== Soaring stars ====
In 2009, soaring stars were brought in, as a way to pick players from the junior grades and to keep them separate from the main award scheme.

===== 2009 =====
Player	Team	# of Soaring Stars
Audrey Kennedy	Offaly	1
Fiona Stephens	Offaly	1
Eimear Moynan	Laois	1
Karen Brady	Offaly	1
Karen Tinnely	Down	1
Michaela Morkan	Offaly	1
Louise Donoghoe	Meath	1
Louise Mahony	Laois	1
Niamh Coyle	Roscommon	1
Arlene Watkins	Offaly	1
Catherine McGourty	Down	1
Aine Lyng	Waterford	1
Susie O'Carroll	Kildare	1
Karen Kelly	Waterford	1
Elaine Dermody	Offaly	1

===== 2010 =====
Player	Team	# of Soaring Stars
Caroline Connaughton	Roscommon	1
Rhona Torney	Antrim	1
Shauna Curran	Waterford	1
Regina Gorman	Kildare	1
Fionnuala Carr	Down	1
Patricia Jackman	Waterford	1
Jennie Simpson	Waterford	1
Bernie Murray	Armagh	1
Kerrie O'Neill	Antrim	1
Michaela Convery	Antrim	1
Aine Lyng	Waterford	2
Shannon Graham	Antrim	1
Sara-Anne Fitzgerald	Laois	1
Jane Adams	Antrim	1
Jane Dolan	Meath	1

===== 2011 =====
Player	Team	# of Soaring Stars
Aisling O'Brien	Waterford	1
Emma Hannon	Waterford	1
Jennie Simpson	Waterford	2
Orla Maginn	Down	1
Aine Keogh	Meath	1
Fionnuala Carr	Down	2
Grainne Kenneally	Waterford	1
Patricia Jackman	Waterford	2
Pamela Greville	Westmeath	1
Catherine McGourty	Down	2
Nicola Morrissey	Waterford	1
Jane Dolan	Meath	2
Colette McSorley	Armagh	1
Karen Kelly	Waterford	2
Niamh Mallon	Down	1

===== 2012 =====
Player	Team	# of Soaring Stars
Emily Mangan	Meath	1
Karen Tinnelly	Down	2
Claire Coffey	Meath	1
Fiona O'Neill	Meath	1
Lisa McCrickard	Down	1
Sarah-Ann Fitzgerald	Laois	2
Aoife Thompson	Meath	1
Catherine McGourty	Down	3
Kristina Troy	Meath	1
Susie O'Carroll	Kildare	2
Jane Dolan	Meath	3
Aileen Donnelly	Meath	1
Niamh Mallon	Down	2
Sinead Hackett	Meath	1
Sara-Louise Carr	Down	1

===== 2013 =====
Player	Team	# of Soaring Stars
Laura Dunne	Laois	1
Karen Tinnelly	Down	3
Aoife Trant	Kildare	1
Katie Aherne	Offaly	1
Aisling Dunphy	Laois	1
Sarah-Anne Fitzgerald	Laois	3
Angela Lyons	Kildare	1
Carol Anne Canning	Dublin	1
Orla Bambury	Kildare	1
Clodagh Flanagan	Kildare	1
Siobhan Hurley	Kildare	1
Louise Mahoney	Laois	2
Denise McGrath	Westmeath	1
Susie O'Carroll	Kildare	3
Niamh Dollard	Laois	1

===== 2014 =====
Player	Team	# of Soaring Stars
Laura Dunne	Laois	2
Karen Tinnelly	Down	4
Ciara McGovern	Down	1
Deirdre Johnstone	Dublin	1
Eimear Delaney	Laois	1
Lisa McAliskey	Down	1
Fionnuala Carr	Down	3
Dinah Loughlin	Westmeath	1
Karen McMullan	Down	1
Annette McGeeney	Roscommon	1
Sarah-Anne Fitzgerald	Laois	4
Catherine McGourty	Down	4
Niamh Mallon	Down	3
Niamh Dollard	Laois	2
Kelley Hopkins	Roscommon	1

===== 2015 =====
Player	Team	# of Soaring Stars
Susan Spillane	Roscommon	1
Rachel Fitzmaurice	Roscommon	1
Laura-Marie Maher	Laois	1
Louise Mahoney	Laois	3
Sarah-Anne Fitzgerald	Laois	5
Pamela Greville	Westmeath	2

===== 2016 =====
Player	Team	# of Soaring Stars
Ciara Donnelly	Armagh	1
Bernie Murray	Armagh	2
Eleanor Tracey	Carlow	1
Ciara Quirke	Carlow	1
Kelley Hopkins	Roscommon	2
Dinah Loughlin	Westmeath	2

==== Intermediate soaring stars ====
===== 2010 =====
Player	Team	# of Soaring Stars
Elaine Dermody	Offaly	2
Michaela Morkan	Offaly	2
Ciara O'Connor	Wexford	1

===== 2011 =====
Player	Team	# of Soaring Stars
Ciara O'Connor	Wexford	2
Frances Doran	Wexford	1
Jane Adams	Antrim	2

===== 2012 =====
Player	Team	# of Soaring Stars
Sinead Cassidy	Derry	1
Katie McAnenly	Derry	1
Sarah Noone	Galway	1

===== 2013 =====
Player	Team	# of Soaring Stars
Rebecca Hennelly	Galway	1
Niamh Mulcahy	Limerick	1
Paula Kenny	Galway	1

===== 2014 =====
Player	Team	# of Soaring Stars
Niamh Mulcahy	Limerick	2
Caoimhe Costelloe	Limerick	1
Catherine Foley	Kilkenny	1

===== 2015 =====
Player	Team	# of Soaring Stars
Susie O'Carroll	Kildare	4
Melissa Lyons	Kildare	1
Lorraine Bray	Waterford	1
Beth Carton	Waterford	1
Patricia Jackman	Waterford	3
Jane Dolan	Meath	4

===== 2016 =====
Player	Team	# of Soaring Stars
Jenny Clifford	Kilkenny	1
Ciara Holden	Kilkenny	1
Linda Collins	Cork	1
Chloe Sigerson	Cork	1
Aisling Burke	Laois	1
Jane Dolan	Meath	5

===== 2017 =====
Player	Team	# of Soaring Stars
Emily Mangan	Meath	2
Sarah Harrington	Cork	1
Claire Coffey	Meath	2
Niamh Ní Chaoimh	Cork	1
Emma Brennan	Carlow	1
Sarah Buckley	Cork	1
Laura Doherty	Westmeath	1
Eimear Reilly	Kildare	1
Caoimhe McCrossan	Westmeath	1
Meghan Thynne	Meath	1
Keeva McCarthy	Cork	1
Amy Gaffney	Meath	1
Aoife Minogue	Meath	1
Jane Dolan	Meath	6
Aoife Bugler	Dublin	1

===== 2018 =====
Player	Team	# of Soaring Stars
Amy Lee	Cork	1
Leah Weste	Cork	1
Sarah Harrington	Cork	2
Alannah Savage	Down	1
Fionnuala Carr	Down	4
Jennifer Barry	Cork	1
Deirdre Johnstone	Dublin	2
Katelyn Hickey	Cork	1
Paula Gribben	Down	1
Caragh Dawson	Dublin	1
Jenny Grace	Tipperary	1
Saoirse McCarthy	Cork	1
Niamh Mallon	Down	4
Sara-Louise Carr	Down	2
Caitriona Collins	Cork	1

===== 2019 =====
Player	Team	# of Soaring Stars
Laura Glynn	Galway	1
Laura Doherty	Westmeath	2
Laura Shinners	Tipperary	1
Nicole Kelly	Down	1
Fiona Leavy	Westmeath	1
Sabina Larkin	Tipperary	1
Dervla Higgins	Galway	1
Patrice Diggin	Kerry	1
Muireann Scally	Westmeath	1
Mairead McCormack	Westmeath	1
Sheila McGrath	Westmeath	1
Meghan Dowdall	Westmeath	1
Grainne McGoldrick	Derry	1
Pamela Greville	Westmeath	3
Tara Ruttledge	Galway	1

===== 2020 =====
Player	Team	# of Soaring Stars
Aedin Lowry	Laois	1
Claire Coffey	Meath	3
Dearbhla Magee	Down	1
Chloe Drain	Antrim	1
Niamh Donnelly	Antrim	1
Fionnuala Carr	Down	5
Clodagh Tynan	Laois	1
Roisin O’Keeffe	Cavan	1
Paula O’Hagan	Down	1
Leanne Donnelly	Armagh	1
Sara-Louise Graffin	Down	1
Maeve Kelly	Antrim	1
Niamh Mallon	Down	5
Ciara Donnelly	Armagh	2
Sorcha McCartan	Down	1

===== 2021 =====
Player	Team	# of Soaring Stars
Catriona Graham	Antrim	1
Chloe Drain	Antrim	2
Roisin Phelan	Kilkenny	1
Niamh Leahy	Kilkenny	1
Sarah Crowley	Kilkenny	1
Leann Fennelly	Kilkenny	1
Aideen Brennan	Wexford	1
Chloe Cashe	Wexford	1
Nicole O'Neill	Antrim	1
Maeve Kelly	Antrim	2
Ciara Banville	Wexford	1
Ava Lynskey	Galway	1
Roisin McCormack	Antrim	1
Ciara Donnelly	Armagh	3
Caitrin Dobbin	Antrim	1

===== 2022 =====
Player	Team	# of Soaring Stars
Aine Grahame	Antrim	1
Clara Hickey	Galway	1
Clara Donohue	Galway	1
Aishling Moloney	Cork	1
Kate Manning	Galway	1
Lisa Casserley	Galway	1
Grainne McNichol	Derry	1
Jennifer Hughes	Galway	1
Emma Laverty	Antrim	1
Joanne Cassidy	Cork	1
Kate Gilchrest	Galway	1
Aoife Minnock	Meath	1
Dervla Cosgrove	Antrim	1
Niamh McPeak	Galway	1
Laura Homan	Cork	1

===== 2023 =====
Player	Team	# of Soaring Stars
Niamh Gribben	Derry	1
Niamh Quinn	Derry	1
Clara Coffey	Meath	4
Sophie Payne	Meath	1
Lauren McKenna	Derry	1
Aoife Ni Chaiside	Derry	1
Ellen Casey	Clare	1
Dervla O'Kane	Derry	1
Aoife Minnock	Meath	2
Mairead McNicholl	Derry	2
Aine McAllister	Derry	1
Amy Gaffney	Meath	2
Aoife Shaw	Derry	1
Caoimhe Cahill	Tipperary	1
Jean Kelly	Tipperary	1

===== 2024 =====
Player	Team	# of Soaring Stars
Cliona Murphy	Kilkenny	1
Emma Flanagan	Cork	1
Niamh O’Leary	Cork	1
Aoife Barrett	Cork	1
Mairead Kennedy	Kilkenny	1
Clodagh Tynan	Laois	2
Hannah Scott	Kilkenny	1
Danielle Morrissey	Kilkenny	1
Tara McCarthy	Cork	1
Cliona O’Callaghan	Cork	1
Laura Homan	Cork	2
Grace Teehan	Offaly	1
Jennifer Crace	Tipperary	1
Aimee Collier	Laois	1
Jackie Hogan	Kerry	1

2025

Player	Team	# of Soaring Stars
Aoife Fitzgerald	Kerry	1
Sharon Shanahan	Offaly	1
Amy Byrne	Offaly	1
Rachel McCarthy	Kerry	1
Orlagh Phelan	Offaly	1
Clodagh Tynan	Laois	3
Dearbhla Magee	Down	2
Patrice Diggin	Kerry	2
Clodagh Leahy	Offaly	1
Grace Teehan	Offaly	2
Roisin McCormick	Antrim	2
Gráinne Delaney	Laois	1
Jackie Horgan	Kerry	1
Mairéad Teehan	Offaly	1
Aimée Collier	Laois	2

==== Intermediate player of the year ====
- 2016 Keira Holden (Kilkenny)
- 2017 Clara Coffey (Meath)
- 2018 Saoirse McCarthy (Cork)
- 2019 Pamela Greville (Westmeath)
- 2020 Niamh Mallon (Down)
- 2021 Maeve Kelly (Antrim)
- 2022 Lisa Casserley (Galway)
- 2023 Aine McAllister (Derry)
- 2024 Danielle Morrissey (Kilkenny)
- 2025 Grace Teehan (Offaly)

==== Junior player of the year ====
A player from the junior grades is picked for this.

- 2016 Eleanor Treacy (Carlow)
- 2017 Aoife Bugler (Dublin)
- 2018 Caragh Dawson (Dublin)
- 2019 Patricia Diggin (Dublin)
- 2020 Clara Donnelly (Dublin)
- 2021 Chloe Cashe (Wexford)
- 2022 Dervla Cosgrove (Antrim)
- 2023 Ellen Casey (Clare)
- 2024 Clodagh Tynan (Laois)
- 2025 Aimée Collier (Laois))

==== International player of the year ====
(Awarded in 2004, discontinued). 2004 Annette McGeeney from Roscommon and Sligo IT. The other nominees were Róisin O'Neill (Britain) and Rosie O'Reilly (USA).

==== Youth awards ====
The first "Young Player of the Year" type award was the Elvery's Cup for “Miss Camogie”. This was much in the tradition of a pageant, and, in 1971, Patricia Morrissey, the UCD Ashbourne Cup-winning captain, took the title of Miss Camogie. Another short-lived young player of the year award, sponsored by Levi's, was taken by Clare Cronin from Cork in 1976. An official award was first given out in 2004.

- 1971 Patricia Morrissey (“Miss Camogie”, from Clare)
- 1976 Clare Cronin (Cork)
- 1977–2003 No girl picked
- 2004 Stephanie Gannon (Galway)
- 2005 Colette McSorley (Armagh)
- 2006 Marie Dargan (Kilkenny)
- 2007 Niamh Mulcahy (Limerick)
- 2008 Carina Rosingrave (Clare)
- 2009 Denise Gaule (Kilkenny)
- 2010 Laura Mitchell (Galway)

== See also ==
- GAA All Stars Awards Past Winners (Football)
- GAA All Stars Awards Past Winners (Hurling)
- GAA All Stars Awards Past Winners (Ladies Football)
- GAA All Stars Awards
