= Jennifer O'Leary =

Irish camogie All-Star

Jennifer O’Leary
Personal information
- Native name: Muireann Ní Laoire (Irish)
- Born: Cork, Ireland

Sport
- Sport: Camogie
- Position: Left half forward
Club*
Years	Club	Apps (scores)
	Barryroe	?
Inter-county**
Years	County	Apps (scores)
2002-2014	Cork	?
Inter-county titles
- All-Irelands: 4
- All Stars: 8
- * club appearances and scores correct as of (16:31, 30 June 2010 (UTC)). **Inter County team apps and scores correct as of (16:31, 30 June 2010 (UTC)).

Jennifer O’Leary is a camogie player, winner of eight All-Star awards in 2004, 2005, 2006, 2007, 2011, 2012, 2013 and 2014 . She won All Ireland medals with Cork in 2002, 2005, 2006 and 2014 and National League medals in 2003, 2006, 2007, when her late point secured victory for Cork, 2012 and 2013. With a total of 2-38 she was the third highest scoring player in the Senior Championship of 2011.

== Career ==
She played on the University of Limerick team that won three Ashbourne Cup titles in a row in 2004, 2005, and 2006.

She returned to the Cork panel in 2010 after a break of two years in Australia.
