= Cork Senior Camogie Championship =

Annual club camogie competition

The Cork Senior Camogie Championship is an annual club camogie competition contested by the top-ranking senior clubs and amalgamated teams in the county of Cork in Ireland. The competition winners are decided through a group and knockout format. It is the most prestigious competition in Cork Camogie. Glen Rovers have been the competition's most successful club with twenty-two victories.

St. Finbarr's are the current champions, after defeating Blackrock in the 2026 final at Castle Road.

== Teams ==
Club	Position in 2026	Championship titles	Last Championship title
St. Finbarr's	Champion	4	2026
Blackrock	Runners-up	2	1952
Sarsfields	Semi-Finals	3	2023
Courcey Rovers	Semi-Finals	1	2020
Aghabullogue	Quarter-Finals	0	–
Ballincollig	Quarter-Finals	0	–
Cloughduv	Quarter-Finals	3	2005
St. Catherine’s	Quarter-Finals	1	2009
Killeagh	Group stage	5	1988
Éire Óg	Group stage	4	1985
Ballinora	Relegation Final	0	–
Glen Rovers	Relegated	22	1996

== History ==
=== 1930s ===
The first Cork Camogie Senior Championship was held in 1932.

=== 1940s ===
In 1947 Imokilly won the championship, beating a factory team from Dwyer’s’ Lee Hosiery Company on North Main Street (the factory building now houses Mr. Price on North Main Street and goes through to the Bodega Bar on Cornmarket Street) in the final. The former were the second divisional team to win the title and the latter the last factory team to contest a final.

In 1948, Blackrock won their first title.

=== 1950s ===
The Glen Rovers club won its first championship in 1950.

=== 1960s ===
Glen Rovers were the dominant team in the 60s, winning seven titles in a row from 1960 to 1967.

=== 1990s ===
Glen Rovers were the dominant team in the 90s, starting off the decade by winning the 1990, 1991, 1992 and 1993 championships.

After the 1993 championship (when the Glen also won the All-Ireland), the Cork Senior Camogie Championship was reorganized into a Senior A Championship with Glen and the Divisional Sides (Seandún, Imokilly, Muskerry and Carbery), and a Senior B Championship with all the other Senior clubs.

The Glen won the first three of these Senior A Championships to make it seven senior titles in a row. They beat Seandún in 1994, 1–14 to 1–9, and also won in 1995 and 1996.

=== 2000s ===
Milford were Runner-Up in 2004 and 2009.

=== 2010s ===
Milford and Inniscarra were the dominant teams in this decade.

Milford had wins in 2012, 2013, 2014 and 2015. They were also Runners-Up in 2011 and 2016.

Inniscarra had wins in 2010, 2016 (beating Milford, 4–10 to 2–13), 2017 (beating the Glen, 2–13 to 1–10) and 2018 (beating Courcey Rovers). They also lost the final in 2019 (to Sarsfields, 0–15 to 3-09) and the first two finals of the following decade (see below).

=== 2020s ===
Inniscarra lost the 2020 final to Courcey Rovers on a score of 1–12 to 5–12. It was Courcey's first victory in the Championship.

The 2021 Senior Camogie Final was contested between Seandún and Inniscarra with the Divisional side running out winners on a score of 2–11 to 0–13.

The 2022 final was contested between Seandún and Sarsfields with the Divisional side running out winners on a score of 2–16 to 1–17. Saint Vincent's Amy O'Connor scored 2–8 on the day and was awarded "player of the match".

In the 2024 championship, the four quarter finals were St. Finbarr's Vs. Inniscarra, Cloughduv v Courcey Rovers, Blackrock Vs. Sarsfields and Glen Rovers Vs. Killeagh.The semi finals were St. Finbarr's Vs. Cloughduv and Sarsfields Vs. Glen Rovers. St. Finbarr's beat Sarsfields in the final at Castle Road.

== Roll of honour ==
#	Team	Wins	Runners-Up	Years won	Years Runners-Up
1	Glen Rovers	22	11	1950, 1951, 1954, 1957, 1958, 1962, 1963, 1964, 1965, 1966, 1967, 1968, 1983, 1986, 1987, 1990, 1991, 1992, 1993, 1994, 1995, 1996	1945, 1946, 1949, 1952, 1955, 1956, 1961, 1980, 1988, 1989, 2017
2	Saint Aloysius (Past Pupils)	15	6	1938, 1938, 1940, 1941, 1943, 1944, 1945, 1946, 1949, 1953, 1955, 1956, 1959, 1960, 1961	1962, 1963, 1968, 1969, 1970, 1971
3	Imokilly	6	4	1947, 1972, 1973, 1974, 1975, 1976	1948, 1996, 2006, 2010
4	Killeagh	5	5	1980, 1981, 1982, 1984, 1988	1978, 1979, 1985, 1986, 1991
5	Inniscarra	4	6	2010, 2016, 2017, 2018	2003, 2005, 2014, 2019, 2020, 2021
5	St. Finbarr's	4	5	2006, 2024, 2025, 2026	1990, 1992, 2002, 2007, 2008
5	Milford	4	4	2012, 2013, 2014, 2015	2004, 2009, 2011, 2016
5	Éire Óg	4	3	1977, 1978, 1979, 1985	1981, 1983, 1987
5	Bishopstown	4	1	1997, 1998, 1999, 2000	1995
10	South Presentation (Past Pupils)	3	6	1969, 1970, 1971	1959, 1960, 1966, 1967, 1976, 1977
10	Sarsfields	3	2	1989, 2019, 2023	2022, 2024
10	Cloughduv	3	0	2001, 2002, 2005	–
13	Lee Hosiery	2	6	1937, 1942	1934, 1940, 1941, 1943, 1944, 1947
13	Blackrock	2	6	1948, 1952	1950, 1951, 1953, 1954, 1957, 2026
13	Seandún	2	3	2021, 2022	1958, 1994, 2023
13	Muskerry	2	2	1933, 2007	1973, 1974
13	Douglas	2	0	2008, 2011	–
13	Saint Aloysius	2	0	1932, 1934	–
19	University College Cork	1	7	1936	1937, 1938, 1939, 1964, 1965, 1972, 1975
19	Fr. O'Neill's	1	4	2003	1997, 1998, 1999, 2001
19	St. Catherine’s	1	3	2009	2012, 2015, 2025
19	Courcey Rovers	1	1	2020	2018
19	Carrigdhoun	1	0	2004	–
19	Mayfield	1	0	1935	–
25	Na Piarsaigh	0	3	–	1982, 1984, 1993
25	Ballincollig	0	1	–	2013
25	Barryroe	0	1	–	2000
25	Cara Cliodhna	0	1	–	1933
25	Clan Eimear	0	1	–	1942
25	Cobh	0	1	–	1932
25	Father Mathew Hall	0	1	–	1935
25	Hillside	0	1	–	1936

== List of finals ==
Munster and All-Ireland winners
Munster winners and All-Ireland finalists
Munster winners

Year	Winners		Runners-up		Winning captain	Referee
Year	Club	Score	Club	Score	Winning captain	Referee
1932	Saint Aloysius	2-03	Cobh	0-02		
1933	Muskerry	5-01	Cara Cliodhna	3-01	Nora Kelleher	
1934	Saint Aloysius	3-02	Lee Hosiery	1-00		
1935	Mayfield	7-02	Fr. Matthew Hall	1-00	Kitty Cotter	
1936	UCC	7-00	Hillside	1-00	Lil Kirby	
1937	Lee Hosiery	4-00	UCC	1-03	Mary Valley	
1938	Saint Aloysius (Past Pupils)	4-02	UCC	4-00	Renee Fitzgerald	
1939	Saint Aloysius (Past Pupils)	3-00	UCC	1-00		
1940	Saint Aloysius (Past Pupils)	8-03	Lee Hosiery	1-01		
1941	Saint Aloysius (Past Pupils)	5-01	Lee Hosiery	0-01		
1942	Lee Hosiery	3-04	Clan Eimear	2-02		
1943	Saint Aloysius (Past Pupils)	6-01	Lee Hosiery	2-01		
1944	Saint Aloysius (Past Pupils)	7-06	Lee Hosiery	3-02		
1945	Saint Aloysius (Past Pupils)	4-02	Glen Rovers	0-00		
1946	Saint Aloysius (Past Pupils)	3-02	Glen Rovers	0-02		
1947	Imokilly	10-02	Lee Hosiery	1-00		
1948	Blackrock	3-02	Imokilly	2-02	Mary Delea	
1949	Saint Aloysius (Past Pupils)	4-02	Glen Rovers	4-00		
1950	Glen Rovers	3-02	Blackrock	1-02	Siobhan O’Brien	
1951	Glen Rovers	2-03	Blackrock	0-03		
1952	Blackrock	4-02	Glen Rovers	1-00		
1953	Saint Aloysius (Past Pupils)	5-01	Blackrock	2-03		
1954	Glen Rovers	4-02	Blackrock	2-00		
1955	Saint Aloysius (Past Pupils)	2-02	Glen Rovers	2-01		
1956	Saint Aloysius (Past Pupils)	1-00	Glen Rovers	0-01		
1957	Glen Rovers	4-02	Blackrock	2-00		
1958	Glen Rovers	6-04	Seandún	1-01		
1959	Saint Aloysius (Past Pupils)	4-01	South Presentation (Past Pupils)	1-01		
1960	Saint Aloysius (Past Pupils)	3-03	South Presentation (Past Pupils)	3-01		
1961	Saint Aloysius (Past Pupils)	4-01	Glen Rovers	1-02		
1962	Glen Rovers	7-07	Saint Aloysius (Past Pupils)	0-02		
1963	Glen Rovers	5-03	Saint Aloysius (Past Pupils)	4-01		
1964	Glen Rovers	4-04	UCC	2-01		
1965	Glen Rovers	5-04	UCC	1-02		
1966	Glen Rovers	3-09	South Presentation (Past Pupils)	1-02		
1967	Glen Rovers	7-07	South Presentation (Past Pupils)	1-01		
1968	Glen Rovers	7-11	Saint Aloysius (Past Pupils)	2-03		
1969	South Presentation (Past Pupils)	2-02	Saint Aloysius (Past Pupils)	1-02	Mary Crowley	
1970	South Presentation (Past Pupils)	3-04	Saint Aloysius (Past Pupils)	1-07		
1971	South Presentation (Past Pupils)	3-03	Saint Aloysius (Past Pupils)	2-01		
1972	Imokilly	1-05	UCC	0-05		
1973	Imokilly	3-05	Muskerry	3-02		
1974	Imokilly	4-04	Muskerry	2-02		
1975	Imokilly	7-13	UCC	1-02		
1976	Imokilly	10-15	South Presentation (Past Pupils)	1-02		
1977	Éire Óg	3-10	South Presentation (Past Pupils)	2-01	Marion McCarthy–Reck	
1978	Éire Óg	3-08	Killeagh	3-06		
1979	Éire Óg	3-06	Killeagh	1-04		
1980	Killeagh	4-09	Glen Rovers	1-04	Breda Landers	
1981	Killeagh	3-06	Éire Óg	1-05		
1982	Killeagh	5-12	Na Piarsaigh	3-07		
1983	Glen Rovers	3-07	Éire Óg	1-04	Anne Delaney	
1984	Killeagh	0-09	Na Piarsaigh	0-03		
1985	Éire Óg	3-07	Killeagh	1-08		
1986	Glen Rovers	4-05	Killeagh	2-04		
1987	Glen Rovers	2-09	Éire Óg	0-09		
1988	Killeagh	3-13	Glen Rovers	4-07		
1989	Sarsfields	3-08	Glen Rovers	1-11		
1990	Glen Rovers	4-14	St Finbarr's	2-06		
1991	Glen Rovers	1-05	Killeagh	0-03		
1992	Glen Rovers	1-12	St Finbarr's	1-04		
1993	Glen Rovers	5-18	Na Piarsaigh	0-03		
1994	Glen Rovers	1-14	Seandún	1-09		
1995	Glen Rovers	2-13	Bishopstown	2-07		
1996	Glen Rovers	2-08	Imokilly	2-05		
1997	Bishopstown	3-06	Fr. O'Neill's	0-06	Eithne Duggan	
1998	Bishopstown	2-10	Fr. O'Neill's	1-10		
1999	Bishopstown	1-08	Fr. O'Neill's	1-05		
2000	Bishopstown	2-13	Barryroe	1-04		
2001	Cloughduv		Fr. O'Neill's			
2002	Cloughduv		St Finbarr's			
2003	Fr. O'Neill's	3-13	Inniscarra	3-08	Fiona O’Driscoll	
2004	Carrigdhoun		Milford			
2005	Cloughduv	3-10	Inniscarra	1-07	Aoife Murray	
2006	St Finbarr's		Imokilly			
2007	Muskerry		St Finbarr's			
2008	Douglas		St Finbarr's			
2009	St Catherine's	1-12	Milford	0-12	Faith Noonan	Collette O’Mahony
2010	Inniscarra	1-08	Imokilly	1-07		
2011	Douglas	1-09	Milford	0-11		
2012	Milford	5-15	St Catherine's	0-05		
2013	Milford	5-17	Ballincollig	0-07		
2014	Milford	2-17	Inniscarra	0-08		
2015	Milford	2-15	St Catherine's	0-09	Sarah Sexton	
2016	Inniscarra	4-10	Milford	2-13	Joanne Casey	
2017	Inniscarra	2-13	Glen Rovers	1-10		
2018	Inniscarra	1-13	Courcey Rovers	0-05	Treasa McCarthy	
2019	Sarsfields	3-09	Inniscarra	0-15		
2020	Courcey Rovers	5-12	Inniscarra	1-12	Karyn Keohane	Cathal McAllister
2021	Seandún	2-11	Inniscarra	0-13	Lauren Homan	Niall O'Neill
2022	Seandún	2-16	Sarsfields	1-17	Susan-Kate Brosnan	Gerard Ahern
2023	Sarsfields	1-11	Seandún	0-09	Niamh O’Callaghan	Andrew Larkin
2024	St Finbarr's	1-16	Sarsfields	0-12	Stephanie Punch	John Horgan
2025	St Finbarr's	0-15	St Catherine's	0-09	Stephanie Punch	Diarmuid Kirwin
2026	St Finbarr's	3-14	Blackrock	0-04	Stephanie Punch	Cathal McAllister
