= Una O'Dwyer (camogie) =

Irish camogie player

Personal information
- Native name: Úna Ní Dhuibhir (Irish)
- Born: County Tipperary, Ireland

Sport
- Sport: Camogie
- Position: Full back
Club*
Years	Club	Apps (scores)
	Cashel	?
Inter-county**
Years	County	Apps (scores)
	Tipperary	?
Inter-county titles
- All-Irelands: 5
- All Stars: 1
- * club appearances and scores correct as of (16:31, 30 June 2010 (UTC)). **Inter County team apps and scores correct as of (16:31, 30 June 2010 (UTC)).

Una O'Dwyer is a camogie player, winner of the Texaco Player of the Year award in 2004, an All-Star award in 2004, a Lynchpin award, predecessor of the All Star awards, in 2003 and All Ireland medals in 1999, 2000, 2001, 2003 and 2004.

== Career ==
She played in eight successive All Ireland finals for Tipperary winning five All Ireland medals in 1999, 2000, 2001, captaining the team in 2003 and winning the Irish Independent player of the match award in 2004. She won her first All Ireland senior club medal with Cashel in 2007 and captained the team to victory against Athenry in 2009. She captained the UCC team to Ashbourne Cup success in 2003.

== Other awards ==
In 2003, she was named as Irish Tatler magazine's 'Woman of the Year Highly Commended Sports Star'.
