= Elaine Burke =

Irish camogie player

Personal information
- Native name: Eibhlín de Búrca (Irish)
- Born: 1981 (age 44–45) County Cork, Ireland

Sport
- Sport: Camogie
- Position: forward
Club*
Years	Club	Apps (scores)
	Valley Rovers Tara Camogie Club London	?
Inter-county**
Years	County	Apps (scores)
	Cork	?
- * club appearances and scores correct as of (16:31, 30 June 2010 (UTC)). **Inter County team apps and scores correct as of (16:31, 30 June 2010 (UTC)).

Elaine Burke is a former camogie player, captain of the All Ireland Camogie Championship winning team in 2005, remember for her catch-cry from the podium: "Rebels abú arís."

== Career ==
She came to prominence at local level when she won the Carrighdoun under-14 camogie tournament competition two years in a row, 1994 and 1995. She won All Ireland senior medals in 2002, 2005 and 2006. She won Ashbourne Cup medals with UCC in 2000 and 2002.

== Personal life ==
She graduated in law and retired when she commenced work with a firm of solicitors in Cork. She moved to London for work and joined Tara Camogie Club 2012, winning Championship and reaching All-Ireland Junior Club semi final. Vice-Captain.
