= 2014 All-Ireland Senior Camogie Championship =

Camogie championship

All-Ireland Senior Camogie Championship 2014
Championship details
- Dates: 21 June - 14 September 2014
- Teams: 9

All-Ireland champions
- Winners: Cork (25th win)
- Captain: Anna Geary
- Manager: Paudie Murray

All-Ireland runners-up
- Runners-up: Kilkenny
- Captain: Leann Fennelly
- Manager: Graham Dillon

Championship statistics
- Matches played: 22

The 2014 All-Ireland Senior Camogie Championship—known as the Liberty Insurance All-Ireland Senior Camogie Championship for sponsorship reasons— is the premier competition of the 2014 camogie season. Nine county teams compete in the Senior Championship out of twenty-seven who compete overall in the Senior, Intermediate and Junior Championships. It commences on 21 June.

== Structure ==
The nine teams are drawn into two groups, one of four teams (Group 1) and one of five (Group 2). All the teams play each other once, scoring two points for a win and one for a draw.

- The two group runners-up and the two third-placed teams play in the quarter-finals.
- The two group winners and the two quarter-final winners play in the semi-finals.
- The semi-final winners contest the 2014 All-Ireland Senior Camogie Championship Final

== Fixtures and results ==
=== Group stages ===
Key to colours
Advance to semi-finals
Advance to quarter-finals

==== Group 1 ====
Team	Pld	W	D	L	F	A	Diff	Pts
Wexford	3	3	0	0	72	41	+29	6
Cork	3	2	0	1	65	32	+33	4
Galway	3	1	0	2	51	41	+10	2
Dublin	3	0	0	3	26	100	–74	0

==== Group 2 ====
Team	Pld	W	D	L	F	A	Diff	Pts
Kilkenny	4	4	0	0	102	35	+67	8
Clare	4	1	0	3	64	48	+16	6
Offaly	4	2	0	2	56	75	–19	4
Derry	4	3	0	1	55	80	–25	2
Tipperary	4	0	0	4	42	81	–39	0

=== Final stages ===
9 August 2014
Quarter-Final
2 p.m.

Cork	2-21 - 1-15	Offaly

Gaelic Grounds, Limerick

9 August 2014
Quarter-Final
4 p.m.

Clare	0-14 - 2-10	Galway

Gaelic Grounds, Limerick

23 August 2014
Semi-Final
2 p.m.

Wexford	1-9 - 1-9	Cork

Semple Stadium, Thurles

24 August 2014
Semi-Final
4 p.m.

Kilkenny	4-12 - 3-7	Galway

Gaelic Grounds, Limerick

30 August 2014
Semi-Final Replay
2:30 p.m.

Wexford	0-8 - 1-15	Cork
	Report

Walsh Park, Waterford

=== All-Ireland final ===
14 September 2014
Final
4:00 p.m.

Cork	2-12 - 1-9	Kilkenny
O Cotter: 0-6 (4fs), J O’Leary 1-1, A Walsh 1-0, B Corkery 0-2, E O’Sullivan, J White, K Mackey 0-1 each.	Report	D Gaule 0-5 (4fs), M Quilty 1-1, C Dormer, S Farrell, K Power 0-1 each.

Croke Park, Dublin
Attendance: 12,476
Referee: John Dolan (Clare)

Preceded by All-Ireland Senior Camogie Championship 2013	All-Ireland Senior Camogie Championship; 1932 – present	Succeeded by All-Ireland Senior Camogie Championship 2015
