= Aoife Murray =

Irish camogie player

Personal information
- Native name: Aoife Ní Mhuirí (Irish)
- Born: 1984 (age 41–42) Kilmichael, Ireland

Sport
- Sport: Camogie
Club
- Years: Club
- 2002 – 2020: Cloughduv
Inter-county
- Years: County
- 2002 – 2020: Crok
Inter-county titles
- All-Irelands: 9
- All Stars: 7

Aoife Murray (born 1984 in Dunmanway) is a camogie player from County Cork in Ireland. Murray's performance in the 2009 All-Ireland Camogie final won the "player of the match" award. She won All Ireland medals in 2002, 2005, 2006, 2008, 2009, and then again in 2014, 2015, 2017, and 2018. Murray won Camogie All Stars Awards in 2004, 2008, 2009, 2012, 2014, 2015 and 2017. She retired from inter-county camogie in 2020.

At the club level, she has won a number of county medals with Cloughduv. Her brother, Kevin Murray, the former Cork Senior hurler also of Cloughduv, won an All-Ireland medal in 1999.
