= Gemma O'Connor (camogie) =

Cork camogie player

Personal information
- Native name: Gemma Ní Chonchúir (Irish)
- Born: 1985 (age 40–41) Cork, Ireland

Sport
- Sport: Camogie
- Position: Half-back, midfield, half-forward
Club
- Years: Club
- St Finbarr's
Club titles
- Cork titles: 2
- Munster titles: 1
Inter-county
- Years: County
- 2002–2024: Cork
Inter-county titles
- All-Irelands: 9
- All Stars: 11

Gemma O'Connor (born 1985) is a camogie player. She is the most decorated player in the sport.

Born in Cork, O'Connor won All-Ireland Senior Camogie Championship medals in 2002, 2005, 2006, 2008, 2009, 2014, 2015, 2017, 2018 and 2024. She is an eleven-time Camogie All Star award winner, six of which she received in succession: (2004, 2005, 2006, 2007, 2008, 2009, 2012, 2014, 2015, 2017 and 2018). She was also a member of the Team of the Championship for 2011.

== Career ==
O'Connor captained the Cork senior team in 2007 and 2019, and is the holder of All-Ireland Minor and Senior Championship honours along with National League Senior and Junior medals. She represented Cork in the Féile na nGael skills in 1998 and was camogie player of the year in 2005 and 2015, as well as winning two Cork Senior Camogie Championship titles in 2006 and 2026. In 2026 she also won the Munster Senior Club Camogie Championship.

== Personal life ==
O'Connor's brother, Glen, lined out with Cork in the 2009 National Hurling League while her uncle, Bill Geaney, captained Cork to an All-Ireland Under 21 Hurling Championship title. In her autobiography, Why not a Warrior (written with Sinead Farrell), O'Connor stated that she met her wife Aoife, a teacher, in 2012 as a result of O'Connor playing association football for Knockavilla Celtic in West Cork, around thirty minutes from where she lived (Knockavilla's manager was Aoife's father).

O'Connor is a soldier in the Irish Army.
