= Anna Geary =

Camogie player and television presenter

Personal information
- Native name: Ánna Ní Ghadhra (Irish)
- Nickname: Asumpta
- Born: 28 July 1987 (age 39) Cork, Ireland

Sport
- Sport: Camogie
- Position: Full Back
Club
- Years: Club
- Milford
Club titles
- All-Ireland Titles: 4
Inter-county
- Years: County
- 2003–2015: Cork
Inter-county titles
- All-Irelands: 4
- All Stars: 6

Anna Geary (born 28 July 1987) is a retired camogie player and television personality from Milford, County Cork, Ireland.

== Sporting career ==
She is a winner of four All Star awards, most recently in 2011. She previously won All-Star awards in 2005 and 2006 and 2010. and All Ireland medals in 2005 2006, 2009 and 2014. She was nominated for a further All-Star award in 2007.

Geary was captain as Cork won the 2014 All-Ireland Senior Camogie Championship. Geary Is the winner of 3 All Ireland Club medals in 2013, 2014 and 2016. Three Munster camogie club medals and three county camogie medals with her club Milford. She also won a European camogie championship playing for GSC Luxembourg in 2008. In May 2015, Geary announced her retirement from inter-county camogie at the age of 27.

== Television career ==
In 2015, she joined the coaching panel of the RTÉ One reality competition series, Ireland's Fittest Family. In her first year on the series she made it to the final with her family, the Daverns, ultimately finishing in third place. She returned to the show in 2016, winning this time with the Cummins family from County Tipperary. It was confirmed in May 2017 that Geary would return to the series for a third consecutive year alongside Davy Fitzgerald, returning coach Derval O'Rourke and new coach, Donncha O'Callaghan.

In 2016, she hosted a weekly sport segment on TV3's The Seven O'Clock Show with Martin King and Lucy Kennedy.

She was also a contributor on Marty Morrissey's weekly RTÉ Radio 1 show, The Marty Squad.

In 2017, she was announced as the pitch-side presenter of eir Sport's Match Night Live. She has regularly contributed as an analyst on RTÉ's The Sunday Game.

In 2018, Geary competed in the second series of Dancing with the Stars and finished runner-up.

In June 2023, she announced that she would be stepping down from Ireland's Fittest Family, with Sonia O'Sullivan replacing her as coach.

== Writing ==
In 2024, Geary published a non-fiction book, Anna's Game Plan.

== Personal life ==
In October 2019, Geary married her long-time partner, Dublin man Kevin Sexton, in a ceremony at Castlemartyr, County Cork. She gave birth to a baby boy in 2023.
