= 2009 National Camogie League =

Camogie tournament

National Camogie League 2009
Tournament details
- Date: 8 February-25 April
- Teams: 22 (7 in Div 1, 6 counties enter 2 teams)

Winners
- Champions: Wexford (2nd title)
- Manager: Stellah Sinnott
- Captain: Una Leacy

Runners-up
- Runners-up: Tipperary
- Manager: Claire Grogan
- Captain: Claire Grogan

Other
- Matches played: 15

The 2009 National Camogie League is a competition in the women's team field sport of camogie was won by Wexford, who defeated Tipperary in the final, played at Parnell Park, Dublin.

== Arrangements ==
The seven teams in the first division were placed in two groups and the top two in each group qualified for the semi-finals.

== The Final ==
Wexford full forward Una Leacy scored two goals before half time to give her team a 2-6 to 0-5 lead at the interval, sending Wexford to their first league since 1977, defeating Tipperary 2-12 to 0-11. Captain Aoife O'Connor delayed her honeymoon to lead out her side. After the match Aoife O'Connor said:

"We've probably been knocking on the door for around 10 or 12 years with various teams coming through, but it's the first time we've actually managed to get across the line, so that's fantastic,"

== Division 2 ==
The Division 2 final, known until 2005 as the National Junior League, was won by Wexford who defeated Antrim in the final. Antrim had won the Division Three title 12 months ago, 2-10 to 0-11. Scores were level six times before Wexford pulled away in the closing quarter thanks to a 1-4 total contribution from Ciara O’Connor – one of three sisters on the team and a sibling to Division One skipper Aoife. Antrim captain Jane Adams scored eight points. The Division 3 final was won by Down who defeated Laois in the final.

=== Final stages ===
2009-4-25
Final
14:00 BST

Wexford	2-12 – 0-11	Tipperary
U Leacy 2-2, K Kelly 0-8 (6f, 1 '45'), M O'Leary, U Jacob 0-1 each.		C Grogan 0-6 (5f, 1 '45'), E McDonnell, E Hayden, J Ryan, G Kinnane, C Hennessy 0-1 each

Parnell Park, Dublin
Attendance: 2,500
Referee: F McDonald (Armagh)

Wexford	Tipperary

WEXFORD:
GK	1	Mags D'Arcy (St Martin's)
RCB	2	Bernie Holohan (Rathnure)
FB	3	Deirdre Codd (Duffry Rovers)
LCB	4	Claire O'Connor (Rathnure)
RWB	5	Áine Codd (Duffry Rovers)
CB	6	Mary Leacy (Oulart–The Ballagh)
LWB	7	Aoife O'Connor (Rathnure)
MF	8	Caroline Murphy (Ferns)
MF	9	Kate Kelly (St Ibar’s) 0-8 (6f, 1 '45')
RWF	10	Michelle O'Leary (Rathnure) 0-1,
CF	11	Rose-Marie Breen (Monageer-Boolavogue)
LWF	12	Josie Dwyer (Ferns)
RCF	13	Ursula Jacob (Oulart-The Ballagh) 0-1 (substituted off) 60'
FF	14	Una Leacy (Oulart-The Ballagh) 2-2
LCF	15	Michelle Hearne (Oulart-The Ballagh)
Substitutes:
RCF		Lenny Holohan (Rathnure) for Jacob (substituted in) 60'

TIPPERARY:
GK	1	Roseanne Kennelly (Drom-Inch)
RCB	2	Suzanne Kelly (Toomevara)
FB	3	Mairead Luttrell
LCB	4	Paula Bulfin (substituted off) 30'
RWB	5	Michelle Short (Drom-Inch)
CB	6	Trish O'Halloran (Nenagh Éire Óg)
LWB	7	Mary Ryan
MF	8	Julia McGrath
MF	9	Jill Horan (Cashel)
RWF	10	Una O'Dwyer (Cashel)
CF	11	Claire Grogan (Cashel) 0-6 (5f, 1 '45')
LWF	12	Cora Hennessy (Cashel) 0-1
RCF	13	Eimear McDonnell (Burgess) 0-1
FF	14	Emily Hayden (Cashel) 0-1 (substituted off) 51'
LCF	15	Geraldine Kinnane (Drom-Inch) 0-1 (substituted off) 58'
Substitutes:
MF		Joanne Ryan (Drom-Inch) for Bulfin (substituted in) 30'
FF		Julie O'Halloran (Nenagh Éire Óg) for Hayden (substituted in) 51'
MF		Cait Devane for Kinnane (substituted in) 58'

MATCH RULES

- 60 minutes
- Replay if scores level
- Maximum of 5 substitutions

Preceded by National Camogie League 2008	National Camogie League; 1977 – present	Succeeded by National Camogie League 2010
