= Gael Linn Cup 2008 =

Winners
- Champions: Connacht (3rd title)

Runners-up
- Runners-up: Munster

Other
- Matches played: 3

The 2008 Gael Linn Cup, the most important representative competition for elite level participants in the women's team field sport of camogie, was won by Connacht, who defeated Munster in the final, played at Ashbourne .

== Arrangements ==
Connacht ran up a record points total for themselves in beating Ulster 1–28 to 0–7 in the semi-final while Munster defeated Leinster 3–14 to 2–14. Jessica Gill and Veronica Curtin were the stars of the Connacht side which won their fourth title and first for eight years, beating Munster 1–14 to 2–10. Daragh Ó Conchúir reported:

Connacht led by 0–7 to 0–5 at half-time but the game really sprung to life two minutes after the restart when Tipperary's Geraldine Kinnane goaled to open up a 1–7 to 0–6 lead for Munster. Midway through the half, the sides were deadlocked as Connacht rallied to draw level at 0–10 to 1–7 before Jessica Gill found the net from a free with seven minutes remaining. Síle Burns netted with a last-minute goal for Munster as Connacht hung on for the victory.

=== Gael Linn Trophy ===
Munster defeated Leinster 4–6 to 1–12. Ulster defeated Connacht 2–11 to 1–6. Munster defeated Ulster 3–17 to 0–3 in the final.

=== Final stages ===
18 May
Final

Connacht	1–14 – 2–10	Munster

Ashbourne

Connacht	Munster

|}

Connacht:
GK	1	Susan Keane (Galway)
RCB	2	Sandra Tannian (Galway)
FB	3	Elaine Burke (Galway)
LCB	4	Therese Manton (Galway)
RWB	5	Ann Marie Hayes (Galway)
CB	6	Sinéad Cahalan (captain) (Galway)
LWB	7	Niamh Kilkenny (Galway)
MF	8	Lorraine Ryan (Galway)
MF	9	Áine Hillary (Galway)
RWF	10	Jessica Gill (Galway)
CF	11	Therese Maher (Galway)
LWF	12	Lourda Kavanagh (Galway)
RCF	13	Brenda Kerins (Galway)
FF	14	Orla Kilkenny (Galway)
LCF	15	Veronica Curtin (Galway)

Munster:
GK	1	Aoife Murray (Cork)
RCB	2	Suzanne Kelly (Tipperary)
FB	3	Rosarii Holland (Cork)
LCB	4	Joanne Callaghan (Cork)
RWB	5	Gemma O'Connor (Cork)
CB	6	Trish O'Halloran (Tipperary)
LWB	7	Vera Sheehan (Limerick)
MF	8	Briege Corkery (Cork)
MF	9	Mairéad Morrissey (Tipperary)
RWF	10	Emer Farrell (Cork)
CF	11	Philly Fogarty (Tipperary)
LWF	12	Orla Cotter (Cork)
RCF	13	Emily Hayden (Tipperary)
FF	14	Clare Grogan (Tipperary)
LCF	15	Síle Burns (Cork)

== Junior Final ==
Final

Munster	3–17 – 0–3	Ulster

Ashbourne

Munster	Ulster

|}

Munster:
GK	1	Denise Lynch (Clare)
RCB	2	Aimee McInerney (Clare)
FB	3	Caroline Motherway (Cork)
LCB	4	Aisling Kelly (Waterford)
RWB	5	Jenny O'Grady (Waterford)
CB	6	Fiona Lafferty (Clare)
LWB	7	Leah Weste (Cork)
MF	8	Ruth Kaiser (Clare)
MF	9	Louise Hayes (Clare)
RWF	10	Róisín O'Brien (Clare)
CF	11	Áine Lyng (Waterford) (captain)
LWF	12	Evelyn Ronayne (Cork)
RCF	13	Carina Roseingrave (Clare)
FF	14	Denise Luby (Cork)
LCF	15	Síle Burns (Cork)

Ulster:
GK	1	Bronagh Keenan (Armagh)
RCB	2	Laura Gribben (Armagh)
FB	3	Maura McAuley (Derry)
LCB	4	Gráinne Kelly (Armagh)
RWB	5	Kelly Maybin (Antrim)
CB	6	Katrina O'Kane (Derry) (captain)
LWB	7	Louise Loughran (Armagh)
MF	8	Danielle McBirney (Armagh)
MF	9	Michelle McGuigan (Armagh)
RWF	10	Karen Tinnelly (Down)
CF	11	Cathy Mulholland (Down)
LWF	12	Suzi Devlin (Antrim)
RCF	13	Cathy Carey (Antrim)
FF	14	Joanne Mallon (Armagh)
LCF	15	Aisling Carr (Tyrone)

Preceded by Gael Linn Cup 2007	Gael Linn Cup; 1954 – present	Succeeded by Gael Linn Cup 2009
