= Gael Linn Cup 2010 =

Winners
- Champions: Leinster (26th title)

Runners-up
- Runners-up: Munster

Other
- Matches played: 3

The 2010 Gael Linn Cup, the most important representative competition for elite level participants in the women's team field sport of camogie, was won by Leinster, who defeated Munster in the final, played at Trim.

== 2010 Senior Competition ==
16 May
Semi-final

Leinster	4–7 – 0–12	Connacht
Una Leacy 3–0, Ann Dalton 1–0, Kate Kelly 0–2, Denise Gaule 0–2 (0–1f), Michelle Quilty 0-2f, S Kehoe 0–1.		Aislinn Connolly 0–6 (0-4f), Therese Maher 0–2, Niamh Kilkenny, Brenda Hanney, Carol Murray, Tara Ruttledge 0–1.

Trim
16 May
Semi-final

Munster	9–17 – 1–4	Ulster
Jennifer O'Leary 2–1, Noreen Flanagan 2–1, Deidre Murphy 2–0, Aine Lyng 1–4, Aoife Geary 1–2, Patricia Jackman 1–0, Gemma O'Connor 0–4, Jill Horan 0–2, Fiona Lafferty, Niamh Mulcahy, Marie Walsh 0–1.		Katie McAuley 1–0, Meabh McGoldrick 0–1, Karen Kielty 0–1, M Hannigan 0–1, M Boyle 0–1.

Trim
16 May 2010
Final
16:00 BST

Leinster	3–17 – 1–14	Munster
Una Leacy 1–1, Elaine Darmody 1–1, Michelle Quilty 1–1, Kate Kelly 0–6 (0–3f), Katie Power 0–6, Denise Gaule 0–1, Arlene Watkins 0–1.	Camogie.ie	Aine Lyng 1–3, Gemma O'Connor 0–4, Jennifer O'Leary 0–2, Jill Horan 0–2, Orla Cotter 0–1, Marie Walsh 0–1, Fiona Lafferty 0–1.

Trim
Referee: Cathal Egan (Cork)

Leinster	Munster

LEINSTER:
GK	1	Caitrina Ryan(Kilkenny)
RCB	2	Michaela Morgan (Offaly)
FB	3	Catherine Doherty(Kilkenny)
LCB	4	Jacqui Frisby (Kilkenny)
RWB	5	Catherine O'Loughlin (Wexford)
CB	6	Mary Leacy (Wexford)
LWB	7	Elaine Aylward (Kilkenny)
MF	8	Denise Gaule (Kilkenny) 0–1
MF	9	Arlene Watkins (Offaly) 0–1
RWF	10	Ann Dalton (Kilkenny), captain
CF	11	Katie Power (Kilkenny) 0–6
LWF	12	Michelle Quilty (Kilkenny) 1–1
RCF	13	Kate Kelly (Wexford) 0–6
FF	14	Una Leacy (Wexford) 1–1
LCF	15	Elaine Darmody (Offaly) 1–1

MUNSTER:
GK	1	Aoife Murray (Cork)
RCB	2	Grainne Kennelly (Waterford)
FB	3	Cathriona Foley (Cork)
LCB	4	Jenny Duffy(Cork) Captain
RWB	5	Mary Ryan (Tipperary)
CB	6	Sabina Larkin (Tipperary)
LWB	7	Julia McGrath (Tipperary)
MF	8	Orla Cotter (Cork) 0–1
MF	9	Anna Geary (Cork)
RWF	10	Marie Walsh (Cork) 0–1
CF	11	Niamh Mulcahy (Limerick)
LWF	12	Jill Horan (Tipperary) 0–2
RCF	13	Áine Lyng (Waterford) 1–3
FF	14	Deidre Murphy (Clare)
LCF	15	Nora Flanagan (Tipperary)
Substitutes:
FF		Gemma O'Connor (Cork) 0–4 (substituted on) 00'
LWF		Patricia Jackman (Waterford) (substituted on) 00'
LCF		Jennifer O'Leary (Cork) 0–2 (substituted on) 00'
RCB		Fiona Lafferty (Clare) 0–1 (substituted on) 00'

MATCH RULES
- 60 minutes
- Extra Time if scores level
- Maximum of 5 substitutions

Preceded by Gael Linn Cup 2009	Gael Linn Cup; 1954 – present	Succeeded by Gael Linn Cup 2011
