= 2004 National Camogie League =

Camogie tournament

National Camogie League 2004
Winners
- Champions: Tipperary (2nd title)
- Captain: Joanne Ryan

Runners-up
- Runners-up: Wexford

The 2004 National Camogie League is a competition in the women's team field sport of camogie was won by Tipperary, who defeated Wexford in the final, played at Nowlan Park.

== Arrangements ==
Wexford overcame defending champions Cork in the semi-final at Wexford Park with a brilliant second half display. Cork, who had the wind advantage in the opening half, were 0-11 to 0-3 ahead at half time. The Wexford fight back began with a goal four minutes after the break from full-forward Michelle Hearne, who added another with three minutes of remaining.

== Division 2 ==
The Junior National League, known since 2006 as Division Two, was won by Kildare who defeated Laois in the final. Susie O'Carroll, with two goals in the opening 20 minutes, inspired Kildare to a fourth title as they withstood a determined Laois recovery

== The Final ==
The two sides shared goals in the opening five minutes, Deirdre Hughes scoring after 90 seconds from close range, and Michelle Hearne quickly replying for Wexford. Eimear McDonnell and Deirdre Hughesagain added further goals as Tipperary led 3-2 to 1-4 at half-time. Tipperary's experience was evident through the second half.

=== Final stages ===
May 22
Final

Tipperary	3-10 – 2-9	Wexford

Nowlan Park

Tipperary	Wexford

Tipperary:
GK	1	Jovita Delaney (Cashel)
RCB	2	Julia Kirwan (Moneygall)
FB	3	Una O'Dwyer (Cashel)
LCB	4	Mary Crorcoran
RWB	5	Sinéad Nealon (Burgess)
CB	6	Ciara Gaynor (Burgess)
LWB	7	Trish O'Halloran (Nenagh Éire Óg)
MF	8	Angie McDermott (Kildangan)
MF	9	Paula Bulfin (Cashel)
RWF	10	Laoise Young (Toomevara)
CF	11	Emily Hayden (Cashel)
LWF	12	Claire Grogan (Cashel)
RCF	13	Eimear McDonnell (Burgess)
FF	14	Deirdre Hughes (Toomevara)
LCF	15	Joanne Ryan (Drom & Inch)
Substitutes:
MF		Lorraine Borke (Drom & Inch) for Bulfin (substituted in) 45'
MF		Geraldine Kinnane (Drom & Inch) for McDermott (substituted in) 51'

Wexford:
GK	1	Mags D'Arcy (St Martin's)
RCB	2	Aisling Moran (Oulart-The Ballagh)
FB	3	Catherine O'Loughlin (Monageer-Boolavogue)
LCB	4	Karen Atkinson (Oulart-The Ballagh)
RWB	5	Rose-Mare Breen (Monageer-Boolavogue)
CB	6	Áine Codd (Duffry Rovers)
LWB	7	Deirdre Codd (Duffry Rovers)
MF	8	Caroline Murphy (Ferns)
MF	9	Kate Kelly (St Ibar’s)
RWF	10	Michelle O'Leary (Rathnure) (substituted off) 48'
CF	11	Mary Leacy (Oulart-The Ballagh)
LWF	12	Orla Hernon
RCF	13	Evelyn Quigley (Rathnure) (substituted off) 25'
FF	14	Michelle Hearne (Oulart-The Ballagh) (substituted off) 55'
LCF	15	Louise Codd (Duffry Rovers) (substituted off) 58'
Substitutes:
RCF		Josie Dwyer Ferns) for Quigley (substituted in) 25'
RWF		Bridget Curran (St Ibar’s) for O'Leary (substituted in) 48'
FF		Claire O'Connor (Rathnure) for Hearne (substituted in) 55'
LCF		Aoife O'Connor (Rathnure) for Louise Codd (substituted in) 57'

Preceded by National Camogie League 2003	National Camogie League; 1977 – present	Succeeded by National Camogie League 2005
