= 2008 National Camogie League =

Camogie tournament

National Camogie League 2008
Tournament details
- Date: 8 February-25 April
- Teams: 22 (7 in Div 1, 6 counties enter 2 teams)

Winners
- Champions: Kilkenny (10th title)
- Captain: Aoife Neary

Runners-up
- Runners-up: Galway
- Manager: Tony Ward
- Captain: Therese Maher

Other
- Matches played: 15

The 2008 National Camogie League is a competition in the women's team field sport of camogie was won by Kilkenny, who defeated Galway in the final, played at Nowlan Park, Kilkenny.

== Arrangements ==
Kilkenny were attempting to win to the league title for the first time since 1993, and on home soil, there was pressure on them to achieve that feat. Kilkenny had defeated then All-Ireland champions Wexford, 2-11 to 1-11, before travelling to Cork to overcome the rebels 0-8 to 1-4 on a wind- swept blustery day to qualify for a league final.

== Final ==
In the league final, Galway led 0-11 to 1-5 at the interval, with an Aoife Neary goal late in the first-half giving Kilkenny hope. Further second-half from Michelle Quilty and substitute Edwina Kean gave Kilkenny victory with Sinead Millea member of the 1993 National League winning campaign top scorer with 0-5 all from frees.

Aoife Neary was named player of the match.

== Division 2 ==
The Division 2 final, known until 2005 as the National Junior League, was won by Clare who defeated Derry in the final. The Division 3 final was won by Antrim who defeated Offaly in the final.

=== Final stages ===
2008-4-26
Final
14:00 BST

Kilkenny	3-11 – 0-17	Galway
Sinéad Millea 0-6 (0-5 frees 0-1’45), Aoife Neary 1-2 (0-1 free), Edwina Kean 1-0 Michelle Quilty 1-0, Ann Dalton, Marie Dargan, Katie Power 0-1 each		Jessica Gill 0-8 (0-5 frees), Veronica Curtin 0-5 (0-3 frees), Brena Kerins 0-2, Lorraine Ryan 0-1 Orla Kilkenny 0-1

Nowlan Park, Kilkenny
Attendance: 1,500

Kilkenny	Galway

KILKENNY:
GK	1	Catríona Ryan (Tullogher)
RCB	2	Amy Butler (Mulinavat)
FB	3	Aine Fahey(Emeralds)
LCB	4	Eimer Lyng(Rower-Innistioge)
RWB	5	Elaine Aylward (Mulinavat)
CB	6	Kelley Anne Cotterell(Mulinavat)
LWB	7	Jacqui Frisby (Ballyhale Shamrocks)
MF	8	Ann Dalton (St Lachtain's)
MF	9	Lizzie Lyng (Rower-Innistioge)
RWF	10	Aoife Neary (James Stephens)
CF	11	Keeva Fennelly (Ballyhale Shamrocks)
LWF	12	Kate McDonald (Thomastown)
RCF	13	Katie Power (Piltown)
FF	14	Sinéad Millea (St Brigid’s Balycallan)
LCF	15	Michelle Quilty (Mulinavat)
Substitutes:
RCF		Julia Anne Woodcock(Danesfort) for Eimear Lyng, (substituted on) 20'
RCF		Collette Dormer (Paulstown) for Cotterell, (substituted on) 30'
RCF		Edwina Kean(St Martin’s) for Quilty, (substituted on) 40'
RCF		Marie Connor(St Lachtain's) for Fennelly, (substituted on) 48'

GALWAY:
GK	1	Susan Earner (Meelick Eyrecourt)
RCB	2	Sandra Tannion(St Thomas)
FB	3	Aibhle Kelly(Davitts)
LCB	4	Therese Manton (Mullagh)
RWB	5	Anne-Marie Hayes (Killimor)
CB	6	Therese Maher (Athenry)
LWB	7	Niamh Kilkenny (Pearses)
MF	8	Lorraine Ryan (Killimordaly)
MF	9	Aine Hillary Pearses)
RWF	10	Lourda Kavanagh(Davitts)
CF	11	Therese Maher Athenry)
LWF	12	Jessica Gill (Athenry)
RCF	13	Orla Kilkenny (Pearses)
FF	14	Veronica Curtin (Kinvara)
LCF	15	Breda Kerins(Athenry)

MATCH RULES
- 60 minutes
- Replay if scores level
- Maximum of 5 substitutions

Preceded by National Camogie League 2007	National Camogie League; 1977 – present	Succeeded by National Camogie League 2009
