= Gael Linn Cup 2009 =

Winners
- Champions: Munster (20th title)

Runners-up
- Runners-up: Connacht

Other
- Matches played: 3

The 2009 Gael Linn Cup, the most important representative competition for elite level participants in the women's team field sport of camogie, was won by Munster, who defeated Connacht in the final, played at Ashbourne.

== Arrangements ==
Ulster withdrew, so with just three entrants, the trophy was staged as a group series among Connacht, Leinster and Munster. Games were played as 15 minutes per half. Connacht represented by an all-Galway side and managed by former county hurler Liam Donoghue, managed to win both their matches in the group stages, beating Leinster, 2–3 to 0–8 and Munster 5–3 to 0–4. This tournament saw Galway's Veronica Curtin return to competitive action and her goals against Leinster. She scored another goal against Munster with further goals from Brenda Hanney, Brenda Kerins, Therese Maher and Ann Marie Hayes. Munster defeated Leinster 2–2 to 0–2, then unexpectedly defeated Connacht in the final 0–7 to 0–2 with the adverse weather playing havoc with proceedings. Munster did the hard work against the wind in the first half to lead 0–4 to 0–1 at half-time, with Orla Cotter scoring three important points.

=== Gael Linn trophy ===
As with the senior competition, the trophy was staged as a group series among Connacht, Leinster and Munster with Connacht defeating Munster in the final 4–4 to 0–2. Niamh McGrath, Molly Dunne, Roscommon's Annette McGeeney and Stacey Coen scored Connacht's goals.

=== Final stages ===
16 May
Final

Munster	0–7 – 0–2	Connacht

Ashbourne

Munster	Connacht

|}

Munster:
GK	1	Denise Lynch (Clare)
RCB	2	Suzanne Kelly (Tipperary)
FB	3	Amanda Regan (Cork) (captain)
LCB	4	Joanne Callaghan (Cork)
RWB	5	Trish O'Halloran (Tipperary)
CB	6	Foina Lafferty (Clare)
LWB	7	Jenny Duffy (Cork)
MF	8	Emily Hayden (Tipperary)
MF	9	Orla Cotter (Cork)
RWF	10	Laura Linnane (Clare)
CF	11	Deidre Murphy (Clare)
LWF	12	Geraldine Kinnane (Tipperary)
RCF	13	Eimear Dillon (Cork)
FF	14	Una O'Donoghue (Cork)
LCF	15	Carina Roseingrave (Clare)

Connacht:
GK	1	Susan Earner (Galway)
RCB	2	Sandra Tannian (Galway)
FB	3	Ailbhe Kelly (Galway)
LCB	4	Therese Manton (Galway)
RWB	5	Regina Glynn (Galway)
CB	6	Sinéad Cahalan (Galway)
LWB	7	Áine Hillary (Galway)
MF	8	Ann Marie Hayes (Galway)
MF	9	Lorraine Ryan (Galway)
RWF	10	Jessica Gill (Galway)
CF	11	Brenda Hanney (Galway)
LWF	12	Laura Kavanagh (Galway)
RCF	13	Niamh Kilkenny (Galway)
FF	14	Therese Maher (Galway)
LCF	15	Brenda Kerins(Galway)

== Junior Final ==
Final

Connacht	4–4 – 2–2	Munster

Ashbourne

Connacht	Munster

|}

Connacht:
GK	1	Sharon Finneran (Rocommon)
RCB	2	Róisín Callanan (Galway)
FB	3	Darelle Coen (Galway)
LCB	4	Niamh Connolly (Rocommon)
RWB	5	Molly Dunne (Galway)
CB	6	Mairéad Linnane (Galway)
LWB	7	Catherine Glynn (Galway)
MF	8	Caroline Murray (Galway)
MF	9	Paula Kenny (Galway)
RWF	10	Caroline Kelly (Galway)
CF	11	Annette McGeeney (Rocommon)
LWF	12	Sarah Dervan (Galway)
RCF	13	Susan Keane (Galway)
FF	14	Aoife Lynskey (Galway)
LCF	15	Claire Curley (Rocommon)

Munster:
GK	1	Jessica Kavanagh (Cork)
RCB	2	Sarah Sherlock (Clare)
FB	3	Sally O'Grady (Waterford)
LCB	4	Pamela Mackey (Cork)
RWB	5	Kate Marie Hearne (Waterford)
CB	6	Chloe Morey (Clare)
LWB	7	Helen O'Mahony (Cork)
MF	8	Louise Hayes (Clare)
MF	9	Katrina Mackey (Cork)
RWF	10	Patricia Jackman (Waterford)
CF	11	Áine Lyng (Waterford)
LWF	12	Áine Breathnach (Waterford)
RCF	13	Mary Coleman (Cork)
FF	14	Denise Luby (Cork)
LCF	15	Carol Kaiser (Clare)

Preceded by Gael Linn Cup 2008	Gael Linn Cup; 1954 – present	Succeeded by Gael Linn Cup 2010
