= All-Ireland Senior Club Camogie Championship 2011 =

Camogie championship

Winners
- Champions: Oulart–The Ballagh (Wexford) (1st title)
- Manager: Brendan O'Connor
- Captain: Una Leacy

Runners-up
- Runners-up: Drom & Inch (Tip)
- Captain: Mary Looby

The 2011 All-Ireland Senior Club Camogie Championship for the leading clubs in the women's team field sport of camogie was won by Oulart–The Ballagh (Wx), who defeated Drom & Inch (Tip) in the final, played at Croke Park.

== Arrangements ==
The championship was organised on the traditional provincial system used in Gaelic Games since the 1880s, with Killimor and Loughgiel winning the championships of the other two provinces. A seventh-minute goal by Mary Looby, set up by Geraldine Kinane and Niamh Harkin helped Drom-Inch dethrone champions Killimor. Ursula Jacob scored 1-16 and Una Leacy and Aideen Brennan the second and third goals as Oulart the Ballagh overwhelmed Loughgiel.

== Final ==
Oulart had 13 players who had been involved in Wexford's All-Ireland senior and intermediate double the previous September 2011. Stacey Redmond was Player of the Match in Oulart's impressive victory in the final. Teenage forward Adeen Brennan scored two of Oulart's goals. The other was scored in the 23rd minute after Una Leacy latched onto a line-ball from the Hogan Stand side by Stacey Redmond, and, despite having the goalie and three defend ers on her case, found the roof of the net. Match referee was Owen Elliott from Antrim. OUlart's success had its roots in the club's absolute dominance of the under-14 Féile na nGael Division 1 series between 1998 and 2002.

=== Final stages ===
February 5
Semi-Final

Oulart–The Ballagh (Wexford)	3-22 – 1-2	Loughgiel Shamrocks (Antrim)

February 12
Semi-Final

Drom & Inch (Tipperary)	1-12 – 1-7	Killimor (Galway)

March 4
Final

Oulart–The Ballagh (Wexford)	3-13 – 0-5	Drom & Inch (Tipperary)

Croke Park

Oulart–The Ballagh	Drom & Inch

Oulart–The Ballagh (Wx):
GK	1	Helena Jacob
RCB	2	Coleen Atkinson
FB	3	Ciara Storey
LCB	4	Karen Atkinson (substituted off) 59'
RWB	5	Stacey Redmond
CB	6	Mary Leacy
LWB	7	Shauna Sinnott
MF	8	Diane Ryan
MF	9	Shelley Kehoe
RWF	10	Tanya Stamp (substituted off) 58'
CF	11	Ursula Jacob 0-7 (2 frees)
LWF	12	Louise Sinnott 0-1 (substituted off) 53'
RCF	13	Adeen Brennan 2-2 (substituted off) 58'
FF	14	Una Leacy 1-0 (substituted off) 53'
LCF	15	Stacey Kehoe 0-3
Substitutes:
LWF		Sharon Kehoe for Louise Sinnott (substituted on) 53'
FF		Aoife O'Connor for Una Leacy injured (substituted on) 56'
RWF		Kerrie Dunne for Tanya Stamp (substituted on) 58'
RCF		Emma Moran for Aideen Brennan (substituted on) 58'
LCB		Donna Kirwan for Karen Atkinson (substituted on) 59'

Drom & Inch (Tip):
GK	1	Rose Kenneally
RCB	2	Patricia McGrath
FB	3	Lorraine Bourke
LCB	4	Niamh Connolly
RWB	5	Norma Harrington (substituted off) 53'
CB	6	Michelle Short
LWB	7	Teresa Shortt (substituted off) 43'
MF	8	Siobhan Bourke
MF	9	Joanne Ryan 0-1
RWF	10	Geraldine Kinane 0-1
CF	11	Antoinette Kennedy (substituted off) 25'
LWF	12	Eimear Shanahan (substituted off) 43'
RCF	13	Caitriona Short 0-2 (1 free, 1 45) (substituted off) 60'
FF	14	Niamh Harkin
LCF	15	Mary Looby 0-1
Substitutes:
CF		Ann Eviston for Antoinette Kennedy (substituted on) 25'
LWF		Aofie McGrath for Eimear Shanahan (substituted on) 43'
LWB		Mairéad Barry for Therese Shortt (substituted on) 43'
RWB		Deirdre Dunne for Norma Harrington (substituted on) 53'
RCF		Siobhan Corcoran for Caitriona Shortt (substituted on) 60'

Preceded by All-Ireland Senior Club Camogie Championship 2010	All-Ireland Senior Club Camogie Championship; 1964 – present	Succeeded by All-Ireland Senior Club Camogie Championship 2012
