= Gael Linn Cup 2006 =

Winners
- Champions: Leinster (25th title)

Runners-up
- Runners-up: Munster

Other
- Matches played: 3

The 2006 Gael Linn Cup, the most important representative competition for elite level participants in the women's team field sport of camogie, was won by Leinster, who defeated Munster in the final, played at Navan.

== Arrangements ==
The 50th anniversary final was staged at Páirc Tailteann, venue for the first match of camogie and the revival inter-provincial series in 1956. Leinster defeated Munster by 2–7 to 1–8 with two late points. A free by Wexford’s Kate Kelly and injury-time point from Kilkenny's Áine Fahy clinched victory for Leinster. Munster, who had nine players from Cork's All-Ireland winning side, trailed 2-3 to 0-5 at half-time after Leinster struck goals by Brigit Curran and Marie Dargan. Munster's only goal came 19 minutes into the second half through substitute Clare Catherine O'Loughlin.

=== Gael Linn Trophy ===
A last-minute point from Veronica Curtin enabled Connacht defeat Ulster by a point 3–12 to 1–17, Ulster having led 1–13 to 2–4 at half time.

=== Final stages ===
October 22
Final

Leinster	2-7 – 1-8	Munster

Navan

Leinster	Munster

|}

Leinster:
GK	1	Caitríona Ryan(Kilkenny)
RCB	2	Keira Kinahan (Kilkenny)
FB	3	Catherine O'Loughlin (captain) (Wexford)
LCB	4	Bronagh Furlong (Wexford)
RWB	5	Áine Fanning (Dublin)
CB	6	Elaine Aylward (Kilkenny)
LWB	7	rea Fitzpatrick (Dublin)
MF	8	Kate Kelly (Wexford)
MF	9	Rose- Marie Breen (Wexford)
RWF	10	Lizzie Lyng (Kilkenny)
CF	11	Louise O'Hara (Dublin)
LWF	12	Marie Dargan (Kilkenny)
RCF	13	Bridget Curran (Wexford)
FF	14	Eimear Brannigan (Dublin)
LCF	15	Aoife Neary (Kilkenny)

Munster:
GK	1	Ellen Clifford (Cork)
RCB	2	Joanne Callaghan (Cork)
FB	3	Suzanne Kelly (Tipperary)
LCB	4	Amanda Regan (Cork)
RWB	5	Rena Buckley (Cork)
CB	6	Mary O'Connor (Cork)
LWB	7	Anna Geary (Cork)
MF	8	Gemma O'Connor (Cork)
MF	9	Joanne Ryan (Tipperary)
RWF	10	Angela Walsh (Cork)
CF	11	Deirdre Murphy (Clare)
LWF	12	Jenny O'Leary (Cork)
RCF	13	Áine Lyng (Waterford)
FF	14	Deirdre Twomey (Cork)
LCF	15	Rachel Maloney (Cork)

== Junior Final ==
Final

Connacht	3-12 – 1-17	Ulster

Navan

Connacht	Ulster

|}

Connacht:
GK	1	Maeve Healy (Rocommon)
RCB	2	Emer Farrell (Rocommon)
FB	3	Fiona Connell (Rocommon)
LCB	4	Lizzie Flynn (Galway)
RWB	5	Serena Brien (Galway)
CB	6	Claire Conroy (Galway)
LWB	7	Julie Brien (Galway)
MF	8	Annette McGeeney (Rocommon)
MF	9	Brenda Hanney (Galway)
RWF	10	Emma Kilkelly (Galway)
CF	11	Veronica Curtin (Galway)
LWF	12	Susan Keane (Galway)
RCF	13	Rachel O'Brien (Galway)
FF	14	Ann Marie Hayes (Galway)
LCF	15	Lisa Smith (Galway)

Ulster:
GK	1	Claire O'Kane (Derry)
RCB	2	Jacinta Dixon (Antrim)
FB	3	Catherine Pickering (Derry)
LCB	4	Jane Carey (Derry)
RWB	5	Bernie McBride (Armagh)
CB	6	Claire Doherty (Derry)
LWB	7	Fionnuala Carr (Down)
MF	8	Gráinne McGoldrick (Derry)
MF	9	Colette McSorley (Armagh)
RWF	10	Denise McCann (Derry)
CF	11	Maureen McAleenan (Down) (captain)
LWF	12	Briege Convery (Derry)
RCF	13	Elaine Dowds (Antrim)
FF	14	Katie McAuley (Derry)
LCF	15	Aileen Laverty (Derry)

Preceded by Gael Linn Cup 2005	Gael Linn Cup; 1954 – present	Succeeded by Gael Linn Cup 2007
