= 2001 National Camogie League =

Camogie tournament

National Camogie League 2001
Winners
- Champions: Cork (11th title)
- Captain: Vivienne Harris

Runners-up
- Runners-up: Galway
- Manager: Billy Carr

The 2001 National Camogie League is a competition in the women's team field sport of camogie was won by Cork, who defeated Galway in the final, played at McDonagh Park, Nenagh. Cork completed an unprecedented run of seven National League titles in a row. Vivienne Harris became the first person to captain three National League winning camogie teams in succession.

== Arrangements ==
The final was postponed due to the Foot-and-mouth disease outbreak in 2001. At the time, Galway were undergoing a period of transition, with new manager Billy Carr and coach Damian Coleman. The delay resulted in Galway being without seven players from Pearses who had qualified for the All-Ireland club final while Olivia Broderick had also retired. Tipperary, meanwhile, were defeated by Cork in their opening league match. Galway were further affected when their opening fixture against Kilkenny was also postponed due to the outbreak.

== The Final ==
Three goals from Jennifer O'Leary helped Cork win their seventh successive title. Galway got off to a flying start and were 0-6 to 0-1 after eleven minutes. Cork then came more into the game. In the 22nd minute, Lynn Dunlea scored a goal to put Cork back in the game. A minute later, Galway scored a point and managed to lead by just one point 0-7 to 1-3 at half-time. Jennifer O'Leary had the ball in the Galway net within a minute of the restart and scored her second goal six minutes later. O'Leary had her third goal in the 46th minute to leave 4-7 to 0-9 and further goals Catherine Corkery and Una O'Donoghue put the finishing touches on Cork’s victory.

== Division 2 ==
The Junior National League, known since 2006 as Division Two, was won by Cork intermediates who defeated Derry in the delayed final on November 4 at the Thomas Davis grounds in Dublin by 3-14 to 4-3. Two opening first half goals from Paula McAtamney had Derry ahead at the break 3-1 to 0-5. Cork turned on the power in the second half with three opening points from Ger Collins and Colette Desmond paving the way for victory.

=== Final stages ===
October 27
Final

Cork	6-9 – 0-11	Galway
Jennifer O'Leary 3-1, Lynn Dunlea 1-3, Una O'Donoghue 1-2, Catherine Corkery 1-0, Fiona O'Driscoll 0-2, Linda Mellerick 0-1		Therese Maher 0-7, C Connolly 0-2, Stephanie Griffin 0-1, Cathy Bowes 0-1.

McDonagh Park, Nenagh

Cork	Galway

Cork:
GK	1	Cora Keohane (Barryroe)
RCB	2	Denise Cronin (Glen Rovers) (0-1)
FB	3	Eithne Duggan (Bishopstown)
LCB	4	Mags Finn (Fr O'Neill’s)
RWB	5	Saara Hayes (Rockbán)
CB	6	Mary O'Connor (Killeagh)
LWB	7	Vivienne Harris (Bishopstown) (Capt)
MF	8	Ursula Troy (Newtownshandrum)
MF	9	Linda Mellerick (Glen Rovers)
RWF	10	Sinéad O'Callaghan (Ballinhassig)
CF	11	Fiona O'Driscoll (Fr O'Neill’s) (0-4)
LWF	12	Caoaimhe Harrington (Newtownshandrum)
RCF	13	Elaine Burke (Valley Rovers)
FF	14	Catherine Corkery (Aghinagh)
LCF	15	Una O'Donoghue (Cloughduv)

Galway:
GK	1	Luoise Curry (Pearses)
RCB	2	Róisín O'Connor
FB	3	Áine Hillary (Pearses)
LCB	4	Therese Maher (Athenry)
RWB	5	Pamela Nevin (Mullagh)
CB	6	Jessica Gill (Athenry)
LWB	7	Cathy Bowes 0-1
MF	8	Sandra Tannian (St Thomas)
MF	9	Caroline Murray (St Thomas)
RWF	10	Stephanie Griffin 0-1
CF	11	Veronica Curtin (Kinvara)
LWF	12	Aislinn Connolly (Castlegar) 0-2
RCF	13	Orla Kilkenny (Pearses)
FF	14	Therese Maher (Athenry) 0-7
LCF	15	Aoife Lynskey (Ardrahan)

Preceded by National Camogie League 2000	National Camogie League; 1977 – present	Succeeded by National Camogie League 2002
