= Gael Linn Cup 2007 =

Winners
- Champions: Ulster (2nd title)

Runners-up
- Runners-up: Leinster

Other
- Matches played: 3

The 2007 Gael Linn Cup, the most important representative competition for elite level participants in the women's team field sport of camogie, was won by Ulster, who defeated Leinster in the final, played at Russell Park.

== Arrangements ==
Ulster defeated Munster by 4–9 to 2–10 at Russell Park, while Leinster received a walkover from Connacht. Ulster then defeated the holders, Leinster, by 2–12 to 3–8 and ended a 40-year wait for their second Gael-Linn title. Despite scoring an 18th-minute goal Leinster trailed by 0–11 to 1–4 at half time and it was the good work of the player of the tournament, Antrim's Jane Adams, Derry's Sinead Cassidy and Katie McAuley, along with Down players Fionnuala Carr and Moya McGinn, which resulted in victory.

=== Gael Linn Trophy ===
Leinster's Junior side made amends for the defeat of their Senior counterparts with a 3–16 to 0–11 win over Munster. Leinster led 1–6 to 0–7 at half-time, but after the restart, Laois's Louise Mahoney scored 1–10, enough to win the Player of the Tournament award. Kilkenny's Anne Farrell and Pauline Comerford along with Westmeath's Pamela Greville and Meath's Lizzy Lynch and Jane Dolan also made vital contributions. Waterford's Áine Lyng scored 0–8 for Munster, while Sharon McMahon and Sally Anne O'Grady were also among the scorers.

=== Final stages ===
20 October
Final

Ulster	2–12 – 3–8	Leinster

Russell Park

Ulster	Leinster

Ulster:
GK	1	Claire O'Kane (Derry)
RCB	2	Ciara McGovern (Down)
FB	3	Moya Maginn (Down)
LCB	4	Kate Laverty (Derry)
RWB	5	Karen McMullan (Down)
CB	6	Claire Doherty(captain) (Derry)
LWB	7	Maureen Stewart (Antrim)
MF	8	Gráinne McGoldrick (Derry)
MF	9	Fionnuala Carr (Down)
RWF	10	Karen Gribben(Down)
CF	11	Jane Adams (Antrim)
LWF	12	Bríd Convery (Derry)
RCF	13	Sheila Cassidy (Derry)
FF	14	Katie McAuley (Derry)
LCF	15	Aisling Diamond (Derry)

Leinster:
GK	1	Eimear Butler (Dublin)
RCB	2	Elaine Aylward (Killkenny)
FB	3	Catherine O'Loughlin (Wexford)
LCB	4	Aoife O'Connor (Wexford)
RWB	5	Eimear Brannigan (captain) (Dublin)
CB	6	Aoife Cullen (Dublin)
LWB	7	Mary Leacy (Wexford)
MF	8	Bróna Furlong (Wexford)
MF	9	Rose-Mare Breen (Wexford)
RWF	10	Kate Kelly (Wexford)
CF	11	Louise O'Hara (Dublin)
LWF	12	Michelle O'Leary (Wexford)
RCF	13	Una Leacy (Wexford)
FF	14	Katie Power (Killkenny)
LCF	15	Aoife Neary (Killkenny)

== Junior Final ==
Final

Leinster	3–16 – 0–11	Munster

Russell Park

Leinster	Munster

|}

Leinster:
GK	1	Eimear Moynihan (Laois)
RCB	2	Eimear O'Connor (Wexford)
FB	3	Pauline Comerford (Killkenny)
LCB	4	Orla Banbury (captain) (Kildare)
RWB	5	Sharon Moylan (Laois)
CB	6	Máire Griffith (Carlow)
LWB	7	Liz Shaw (Westmeath)
MF	8	Jacinta Goonery (Westmeath)
MF	9	Elizabeth Lynch (Meath)
RWF	10	Frances Lynch (Meath)
CF	11	Aileen Donnelly (Meath)
LWF	12	Elaine Mahoney (Laois)
RCF	13	Catrina Phelan (Laois)
FF	14	Louise Mahoney (Laois)
LCF	15	Aoife Neary (Killkenny)

Munster:
GK	1	Aisling O'Brien (Waterford)
RCB	2	Denise Lynch (Clare)
FB	3	Mary Ann Hawkes (Cork)
LCB	4	Sally Ann O'Grady (Clare)
RWB	5	Deirdre Murphy (Clare)
CB	6	Fiona Lafferty (Clare)
LWB	7	Aisling Kelly (Waterford)
MF	8	Charlotte Raher (Waterford)
MF	9	Bríd Twomey(captain) (Cork)
RWF	10	Deirdre Corcoran (Clare)
CF	11	Jane Scanlon (Clare)
LWF	12	Kate Lynch (Clare)
RCF	13	Sharon McMahon (Clare)
FF	14	Gráinne Kenneally (Waterford)
LCF	15	Áine Lyng (Waterford)

Preceded by Gael Linn Cup 2006	Gael Linn Cup; 1954 – present	Succeeded by Gael Linn Cup 2008
