= 2005 National Camogie League =

Camogie tournament

National Camogie League 2005
Winners
- Champions: Galway (3rd title)
- Manager: Damian Coleman, Sharon Glynn & P. J. Molloy
- Captain: Therése Maher

Runners-up
- Runners-up: Cork

The 2005 National Camogie League is a competition in the women's team field sport of camogie was won by Galway, who defeated Cork in the final, played at Thurles.

== Background ==
Galway were without Lourda Kavanagh and Áine Hilary due to injury, and their victory was more remarkable for the fact they failed to win a single league match in 2004, but under the new management team of Sharon Glynn, former U21 hurler Damian Coleman and former All-Ireland Senior Hurling Championship winner P. J. Molloy.

== Final ==
Galway's match-turning goal came two minutes into injury-time of the first half when Breda Kerins found the waiting Veronica Curtin who scored to put Galway 1–4 to 0–3 ahead. Galway started nervously and had to wait 23 minutes before their opening score, a point from full-forward Veronica Curtin who was to marry to selector Damian Coleman. After Eimear Dillon and Curtin exchanged points early in the second half, Cork closed the gap with two Jennifer O'Leary frees, the second which came 12 minutes into the half was Cork's last score of the day. Galway too failed to score again until the 20th minute when Veronica Curtin sent over her fifth point.

== Goalkeeper misses penalty ==
Galway had a chance to wrap it up with seven minutes to go when they were awarded a penalty. Goalkeeper Stephanie Gannon, the 2004 young player of the year, ran the length of the pitch to take the penalty, but it was saved on the line.

== Aftermath ==
Galway manager, the former hurler Damian Coleman, said:

"We came determined to compete and win. Those girls did everything that was asked of them, I am so proud of them.

== Division 2 ==
The Junior National League, known since 2006 as Division Two, was won by Cork intermediates who defeated Galway intermediates in the final.

=== Final stages ===
Final

Galway	1–6 – 0–6	Cork

Thurles

Galway	Cork

Galway:
GK	1	Stephanie Gannon (Athenry)
RCB	2	Regina Glynn (Athenry)
FB	3	Sinéad Cahalan (Mullagh)
LCB	4	Nicole Gavin (Ahascragh-Caltra)
RWB	5	Lorraine Lally (Pearses)
CB	6	Therése Maher (Athenry) (captain)
LWB	7	Aibhe Kelly (Davitts)
MF	8	Shauna Murphy (Loughrea)
MF	9	Colette Glennon
RWF	10	Aoife Lynskey (Ardrahan)
CF	11	Brenda Hanney (Killimor)
LWF	12	Orla Kilkenny (Pearses)
RCF	13	Breda Kerins (Ardrahan)
FF	14	Veronica Curtin (Kinvara)
LCF	15	Emma Kilkelly (Kinvara)
Substitutes:
RWF		Katherine Glynn (Athenry) for Glennon (substituted on) 43'
MF		Aislinn Connolly (Castlegar) for Hanney (substituted on) 52'
LCF		Jessica Gill (Athenry) for Lynskey (substituted on) 58'
LCF		Fiona Healy (Mullagh) for Shauna Murphy (substituted on) 62'

Cork:
GK	1	Aoife Murray (Cloughduv)
RCB	2	Jennifer Browne
FB	3	Stephanie Delea (Cloughduv)
LCB	4	Joanne Callaghan (Cloughduv) (substituted off) 54'
RWB	5	Amanda Regan (Douglas)
CB	6	Mary O'Connor (Killeagh)
LWB	7	Nora Ahern (Fr O'Neill's)
MF	8	Rachel Maloney (Courcey Rovers)
MF	9	Briege Corkery (Cloughduv) (substituted off) Half time'
RWF	10	Angela Walsh (Killeagh)
CF	11	Eimear Dillon (Ballygarvan) 0–2
LWF	12	Jennifer O'Leary (Barryroe) 1–3
RCF	13	Colette Desmond (Newcestown) (substituted off) 43'
FF	14	Una O'Donoghue (Cloughduv) 0–1
LCF	15	Ciara Healy (substituted off) 58'
Substitutes:
MF		Vivienne Harris (Bishopstown) for Corkery (substituted on) Half time'
RCF		Elaine Burke (Valley Rovers) for Desmond (substituted on) 43'
LCB		Rosarie Holland (Barryroe) for O’Callaghan (substituted on) 54'
LCF		Paula O'Connor (Newtownshandrum) for Healy (substituted on) 58'

Preceded by National Camogie League 2004	National Camogie League; 1977 – present	Succeeded by National Camogie League 2006
