= All-Ireland Senior Club Camogie Championship 2010 =

Camogie championship

Winners
- Champions: Killimor (Galway) (1st title)
- Captain: Brenda Hanney

Runners-up
- Runners-up: Inniscarra (Cork)

The 2010 All-Ireland Senior Club Camogie Championship for the leading clubs in the women's team field sport of camogie was won by Killimor (Gal), who defeated Inniscarra (Cork) in the final, played at Croke Park.

== Arrangements ==
The championship was organised on the traditional provincial system used in Gaelic Games since the 1880s, with Oulart–The Ballagh and O'Donovan Rossa winning the championships of the other two provinces. Martina Conroy’s accuracy from placed balls secured Killimor a one-point victory over Oulart the Ballagh in the semi-final.

== The Final ==
Brenda Hanney was player of the match as Killimor led by 2–4 to 0–1 at half time in the final, played at Croke Park for the first time since 1973, and went on to win by 20 points.

=== Final stages ===
September 1
Semi-Final

Killimor (Gal)	0-9 – 0-8	Oulart–The Ballagh (Wexford)

Ballinasloe

September 8
Semi-Final

Inniscarra (Cork)	1-14 – 1-6	O'Donovan Rossa

Nowlan Park

March 6, 2011
Final

Killimor (Gal)	3-18 – 1-4	Inniscarra (Cork)

Croke Park

Killimor (Gal)	Inniscarra (Cork)

Killimor (Gal):
GK	1	Helen Campbell
RCB	2	Niamh Hanney
FB	3	Nicola Lawless
LCB	4	Julie Brien
RWB	5	Karen Brien
CB	6	Ann Marie Hayes
LWB	7	Marie Duane
MF	8	Emer Haverty (0–2)
MF	9	Ann Marie Starr
RWF	10	Susan Keane (0–4)
CF	11	Brenda Hanney (captain) (0–4)
LWF	12	Martina Conroy (1–6)
RCF	13	Helen Quinn (1–0)
FF	14	Claire Conroy (0–1)
LCF	15	Lorraine Donnelly (1–0)

Inniscarra (Cork):
GK	1	Sinéad Ní Riain
RCB	2	Aileen Sheehan
FB	3	Liz Hayes
LCB	4	Mary Buckley
RWB	5	Emma Kingston (0–1)
CB	6	Rosie O'Mahony
LWB	7	Karen Jones
MF	8	Rena Buckley (0–1)
MF	9	Orla Healy
RWF	10	Joanne Casey (0–1)
CF	11	Margaret Noelle O'Sullivan (captain)
LWF	12	Katie O'Mahony
RCF	13	Margaret Cosgrove
FF	14	Fiona O'Connell
LCF	15	Niamh Dilworth (1–1)

Preceded by All-Ireland Senior Club Camogie Championship 2009	All-Ireland Senior Club Camogie Championship; 1964 – present	Succeeded by All-Ireland Senior Club Camogie Championship 2011
