= 2011 All-Ireland Senior Camogie Championship =

Camogie championship

All-Ireland Senior Camogie Championship 2011
Championship details
- Dates: 11 June - 11 September 2011
- Teams: 8

All-Ireland champions
- Winners: Wexford (6th win)
- Captain: Ursula Jacob
- Manager: JJ Doyle

All-Ireland runners-up
- Runners-up: Galway
- Captain: Brenda Hanney
- Manager: Noel Finn

Championship statistics
- Matches played: 27

The 2011 All-Ireland Senior Camogie Championship—known as the All-Ireland Senior Camogie Championship in association with RTÉ Sport for sponsorship reasons— is the premier competition of the 2011 camogie season. It commenced on 11 June 2011 and ended with the final on 11 September. Eight county teams compete in the Senior Championship out of twenty-seven who compete overall in the Senior, Intermediate and Junior Championships. Wexford defeated Galway in the final, avenging a surprise 11-point defeat in the round-robin stage of the championship.

== Structure ==
The eight teams played one another once, and receive 2 points for a win, 1 point for a draw. The top four teams then contested the semi-finals.

== Change of sponsor ==
The Camogie Association lost its sponsor, the Gala retail chain, just six weeks before throw-in and arranged a partnership with RTÉ, “in Association with RTÉ sport,” instead. One outcome of the partnership was live updates on RTÉ radio were available for the first time as well as an improved two-minute highlights package on the Sunday game on RTÉ television. The finals were televised live and the semi-finals broadcast live online on RTÉ.ie.

== Launch ==
Camogie Association president Joan O'Flynn made an appeal for a heightened profile for women's sport at the launch of the championship.

Sport is for all. Just as sport played by men is not for men only, sport played by women is not for women only. I am urging all sports fans to experience the skill and excitement of top class camogie action and to see our sport stars in action. An increase in women in decision making roles in sport, positive attitudes and actions towards women's sport and giving greater prominence and recognition to women's sporting achievements will all make a difference. It is vital for future female participation in sport that children get the opportunity to understand that women are major sports achievers and are accomplished sports stars in their own right.

At the captain's launch of the All Ireland final Camogie Association president Joan O'Flynn spoke out about the representation of females in sporting attire used in a crisps ad. She said "the Hunky Dory campaign, which features women wearing revealing crop tops in sport poses, was particularly ill-timed given that camogie's top teams will be starring in Croke Park this Sunday."

== Preparations ==
In the lead-in to the competition, there were management changes in Cork, where Joe O'Brien of Glanworth became manager, Tipperary where John Lillis became manager and Dublin where Denis Murphy became manager. Three members of the Clare management team resigned in advance of the championship.

== Results ==
Onfield, the Championship was the most open for several years with all of the leading contenders suffering a defeat in the first three rounds of the championship. In the opening round, 2010 defeated finalists Galway imposed a surprise 11-point defeat on the defending champions, Wexford. It was the second successive year Galway had defeated Wexford in the round-robin series, only to lose the All Ireland final to the same opponents on both occasions. The aggregate scoring average of 32.82 points per match was the highest in championship history. Cork had the highest scoring average with 22.71 points per match.

The 2010 Intermediate champions Offaly, managed by Joachim Kelly, were competing at senior level for the first time and achieved their first victory at this level against Dublin and followed it up with a victory over Clare in the final round. Clare, too, achieved a historic third round victory over Tipperary, their first since 1995 and their first in the senior championship since 1946.

From the beginning five teams were in contention for four semi-final slots. Despite an initial showing by Tipperary, who had last contested an All Ireland semi-final in 2008, at the end of the group stages the four teams who qualified for the semi-finals, Cork, Galway, Kilkenny and Wexford, were the same as for the previous two years 2009 and 2010.

== Semi-finals ==
In the semi-finals Wexford (2-11) defeated Cork (1-9) with goals by Ursula Jacob (30 mins) and Katrina Parrock (40 mins), while Cork's goal was scored by Katriona Mackey (54 mins). Galway (2-13) defeated Kilkenny with goals by Brenda Hanney (23 mins) and Tara Ruttledge (59 mins) while Kilkenny's goal was scored by Edel Maher (31 mins). The attendance of 5,100 was a record for the semi-finals and higher than many All-Ireland Senior Camogie Championship finals before 1994.

== Final ==
Turning point of the final was the 52nd-minute goal scored by Ursula Jacob. Eight out of 14 journalists at the final described it as among the best in the history of the game. TV analyst and three times All Ireland medalist Therese O'Callaghan described it as “a dream goal, as good a goal as you are likely to see.” Former Galway hurling manager Cyril Farrell said during the course of his TV match commentary:

"That's as good a goal as you will see anywhere, a beautiful cross field ball from Josie Dwyer, fantastic catch, back towards the goal, turn on the left, bang in to the back of the net. You won't see better than that anywhere. Everything is just on precision, on the dot. Catches it, turns left handed, bang to the back of the net, brilliant score."

Galway manager Noel Finn said: “The goal came against the run of play. It was a sucker punch that late, they got their dander up. They were winning the breaks and when you're on the back foot it is very hard to try and push on. It brought the initiative back to Wexford after they had dominated the first half, having taken the initiative with a penalty scored by Una Leacy (4 minutes, but fallen three points behind after a snap goal scored by Tara Ruttledge (37 minutes). Galway led by 1–8 to 1–5 after 50 minutes, but failed to score in the last ten minutes. Finn pondered:

“When you go 10 minutes without scoring, especially the last 10 minutes, you're not going to hold out. They got the break and they took their scores. When Tara got the goal I thought we would drive on because we were hurling well at that stage, but Wexford dug deep and got the result and its heartbreak again for us this year, I just thought when Wexford went in front they killed the game, that's experience, we have to learn, it's very hard to lose two finals. I said coming up here today we were well prepared, better than last year and if we played to our ability we would have got a result. Wexford hit us hard, and fair play to them they are All Ireland champions and we have to suffer the consequences of losing another All Ireland.”

== Attendance & TV audience ==
The attendance of 14,974 was the sixth highest ever for a camogie-only final day in Croke Park. An average TV audience of 218,000 tuned in for full match coverage on RTÉ sport (including half and full time analysis), recording a Nielsen rating of 5.22 and a market share of 23.14, the fifth highest viewership in the game's history. The final minutes of the game attracted a peak of 303,000 viewers. A further 3,312 viewed on live web feed.

== Management reaction ==
Winning manager JJ Doyle of Wexford said:

”What the Wexford teams achieved out there today I doubt ever will be achieved again. We have been in six competitions in two years and we won every one of them. I think they can lay claim to being one of the greatest camogie teams ever to play the game now. The amount of work that went in was phenomenal. We did it because Wexford loves camogie and loves GAA.

They weren't letting us run at them. It was the way it was in Bellefield earlier in the year, a game that was talked about an awful lot. People had said a lot of things about Wexford camogie, especially the senior team. People questioned our girl's hunger. People questioned our desire, said that Galway were going to be hungrier than us. They questioned a lot of things about the team. We wanted to get the opportunity to answer them. Thankfully we have done that. It is very hard to put into words what I feel right now. I feel extremely proud of the girls, all 48 that have been training with us. The first half seemed to go on for hours and the second half just flew by. Then we got into injury time and I thought it would never end. Anyone looking at that out there today will see that Wexford camogie is made of very very stern stuff. You don't play for as many years as these girls have and not have the character.

When Galway got the goal lesser teams would have buckled. I have learned a lot about the girls and they have learned a lot about themselves.”

The losing manager Noel Finn of Galway stood down on the Sunday night of the All-Ireland final:

I am very, very disappointed. Last year was hard to take but losing again today was devastation. The girls are devastated in there. We all are. Sport can be cruel, great when you win, very very hard to take when you lose. Scrappy first half. Two points downat half time, I felt we were in the game. We came out with all guns blazing in the second half. When we went three points in front and I thought we would have pushed on. Instead Wexford came back at us. They got the scores and they finished us. It was very, very exciting there. Anyone could have won as it went down to the wire. After they got the goal they sort of pushed on.”

== Media reaction ==
Media coverage was generally favourable, praising the intensity and excitement of the game, sometimes at the expense of individual skill. Three times All Ireland medalist Therese O'Callaghan, a television analyst said “Galway did very little wrong today while her co-analyst Stellah Sinnott, a former Wexford manager said “the second half had everything you could look for in an All-Ireland final. What separated Wexford from them in the end was Ursula Jacob's goal.”

Diarmuid O'Flynn wrote in the Irish Examiner, “on such margins do big games turn.” the Irish Independent reported: “like all true champions, JJ Doyle's side simply refused to yield” and the Irish Times noted “Tara Ruttledge had a shot for a point to give them a vital cushion but the sliotar rebounded off the upright across the face of goal and crucially there was no Galway player on hand to tap to the net. Had there been, that would surely have been game over.”

Regional media praised the standard of the game but had predictably contrasting reactions to the results. The Wexford People declared: “Wexford started the week as the peoples champions - battlers, and winners, to the end - they finished it as probably the greatest Camogie side in game's history” while sportswriter and author Dean Goodison wrote “a stunning rearguard action by the best set of backs ever to grace a camogie field kept the game alive in the first half.” The Enniscorthy Echo noted “‘the game as a whole was tough, with both sides tackling hard, hunting in packs and producing some incredible hooking and blocking as they threw the kitchen sink at each other in 60 minutes of pulsating camogie.”

In the defeated county, the Galway Advertiser concluded “what will really stick in the craw when the game is analysed is that Galway won most of the individual battles.” The Tuam Herald picked out the performance of “the lionhearted Therése Maher who proved “that she is up there with the best and most versatile camogie players we have seen or may ever see.” Eoghan Cormican of the Connacht Tribune wrote: “Sickening, absolutely sickening - it's hard to find a better or more apt adjective to describe Sunday's All Ireland senior camogie final. Hearts sunk with the sounding of the final whistle.”

Cyril Farrell also said that the refereeing had been very fussy. “If the hurling all Ireland was refereed like that last week there would have been a stoppage every twenty seconds. “

== Galway anomaly ==
When Galway beat Wexford by a massive 2–14 to 0–9 in the group stages only to lose the final 2–7 to 1-8, it was the second time in a row they had defeated Wexford in the group stages only to lose to the same opposition in the final, and the fourth time in the six years since the championship moved from a knockout system to a round-robin format in 2006 that the runners-up defeated the eventual champions in the group stages.

== Protocol precedent ==
The Irish Independent noted in their after-match commentary:

“After lining up to greet the Taoiseach, the Wexford team, led by captain and eventual match-changer Ursula Jacob, turned left and came down along the line, shaking hands with all of their Galway opponents before trotting into position for the pre-match parade. It was a nice sporting gesture, surely one that would add greatly to the men's big days.”

== Homecoming ==
The homecoming for the Wexford senior team along with their intermediate colleagues on Monday September 12 was in two stages, to Enniscorthy and Wexford town. Enniscorthy Town Council organised a reception for the two Wexford teams where “but the sports loving Council Cathaoirleach could barely be heard over the din as the members of both winning panels were introduced to the crowd.” They arrived on Wexford Quays in an open-topped bus before stepping onstage to greet a large local crowd. The Enniscorthy Echo reported: “Wexford's homecoming was a throwback to receptions in Enniscorthy for returning Wexford All-Ireland teams.” David Medcalf wrote in the Wexford People “the formality of a civic reception was lost in the sheer joy of the occasion.”

== Aftermath ==
Galway manager Noel Finn stepped down on the Sunday evening of the final in the wake of his side's narrow defeat. The winning Wexford team brought the O'Duffy Cup on a tour of the county to schools, clubs and good causes wanting to have the trophy present in their midst.

== Team of the Championship ==
The team of the championship selected by RTÉ sports team was:

Mags D’Arcy (Wexford);

Claire O'Connor (Wex), Catherine O'Loughlin (Wex), Lorraine Ryan (Gal);

Ann Marie Hayes (Gal), Therese Maher (Gal), Mary Leacy (Wex);

Niamh Kilkenny (Gal), Jill Horan (Tipp);

Gemma O'Connor (Cork)., Kate Kelly (Wex), Aislinn Connolly (Gal);

Katrina Parrock (Wex), Ursula Jacob (Wex), Michelle Quilty (Kilk);

== Player of the Round ==
The Irish Daily Star Performance Award is given the player who is judged to have given the best performance on each match day.

- First Round: Therese Maher, Galway
- Second Round: Jill Horan, Tipperary
- Third round: Noeleen Lambert, Wexford
- Fourth round: Ann Marie Starr, Galway
- Fifth round: Ann Dalton, Kilkenny
- Sixth round: Jill Horan, Tipperary
- Seventh round: Elaine Aylward, Kilkenny
- Semi-final round: Ursula Jacob, Wexford
- Final: Kate Kelly, Wexford

== Fixtures ==
=== Group stage ===
June 11, 2011	Cork	3-16 – 0-10	Clare	Clooney, Quin
	Sile Burns 3-4, Jennifer O'Leary 0-7 (0-2f, 0-1 from a 45), Orla Cotter 0-1f, Briege Corkery, Eimer O'Sullivan, Linda Dorgan, Katriona Mackey 0-1 each		Claire McMahon 0-7 (0-6f), [hloe Morey 0-2, Deidre Murphy 0-1

June 11, 2011	Kilkenny	4-17 – 2-11	Offaly	St Brendan's Park, Birr
	Michelle Quilty 2-7 (0-5f, 0-1 from a 45), Aoife Neary 1-1, Marie Connor 1-0, Ann Dalton 0-5, Áine Fahy 0-2, Denise Gaule, Edel Maher 0-1 each		Tina Hannon 1-1, Michaela Morgan 1-0, Elaine Darmody 0-7f, Siobhán Flannery 0-2, Arlene Watkins 0-1

June 11, 2011	Tipperary	3-12 – 1-12	Dublin	Portmarnock Naomh Mearnóg
	Sarah Fryday 2-2, Noren Flanagan 1-1, Jill Horan 0-4, Claire Grogan 0-3 (0-2f), Cora Hennessy, Eimer Shanahan 0-1 each		Louise O'Hara 0-5 (0-4f), Ciara Burgess 0-3, Áine Fanning 0-2, Emer McCarthy, Amy Murphy 0-1 each

June 11, 2011	Galway	2-14 – 0-9	Wexford	Bellefield, Enniscorthy
	Veronica Curtin 2-2, Aislinn Connolly 0-7 (0-5f), Noreen Coen, Martina Conroy 0-2 each, Therese Maher 0-1		Ursula Jacob 0-7 (0-6f), Katie Kelly 0-2 (0-1f)

June 18, 2011	Galway	1-10 – 1-7	Clare	Kenny Park, Athenry
	Veronica Curtin 1-3 (0-2f), Sandra Tannian, Brenda Hanney, Aislinn Connolly 0-2 each, Noreen Coen 0-1)		Chloe Morey1-0 pen) [laire McMahon0-4f, Fiona Lafferty0-2, Sinéad O'Loughlin0-1

June 18, 2011	Wexford	0-14 – 1-8	Cork	Páirc Uí Chaoimh
	Ursula Jacob 0-8, (0-1 from a 45 0-3f), Una Leacy, Katrina Parrock 0-2 each, J Dwyer, Evelyn Quigley 0-1 each		Denise Cronin 1-0, Jennifer O'Leary 0-4 (0-2f) Katriona Mackey 0-2, Briege Corkery, Eimer O'Sullivan 0-1 each

June 18, 2011	Kilkenny	2-11 – 1-2	Dublin	Thomastown
	Áine Fahy 1-2, Aoife Neary 1-2 (0-1f), Michelle Quilty 0-5 (0-2f, 0-2 from a 45), Sarah Ann Quinlan 0-2, Ashling Dunphy 0-1		Ciara Burgess 1-0, [iara Durkan 0-1, Louise O'Hara 0-1 f

June 18, 2011	Tipperary	3-14 – 1-14	Offaly	Semples Stadium, Thurles
	Jill Horan 1-3, Sarah Fryday 1-1, Noren Flanagan 1-0, Claire Grogan 0-6 (0-3f), Cora Hennessy 0-2, Alison Lonergan 0-1		Linda Sullivan 1-0, Elaine Darmody0-9 (0-6f, 0-2 from a 45), Tina Hannon, Aoife Kelly, Arlene Watkins, Siobhán Flannery, Michaela Morgan 0-1 each

June 25, 2011	Clare	1-11 – 0-9	Tipperary	Cusack Park, Ennis
	Nora Murphy 1-0, [laire McMahon 0-8 (0-7f, 0-1 from a 45), Fiona Lafferty 0-2, [hloe Morey 0-1f		Jill Horan 0-3, Claire Grogan 0-3 (0-2f), Cora Hennessy 0-2f, Nicola Walsh 0-1

June 25, 2011	Offaly	2-15 - 0-14	Dublin	Portmarnock Naomh Mearnóg
	Arlene Watkins2-0, Elaine Dermody0-9 (0-8f), Siobhán Flannery0-4, Tina Hannon, Aoife Kelly 0-1 each		Alison Maguire 0-8 (0-4, 0-1 from a 45), Amy Murphy 0-2, Ciara Burgess, Ciara Durkan, Áine Fanning, Miriam Twomey 0-1 each

June 25, 2011	Wexford	1-14 – 1-9	Kilkenny	Wexford Park
	Evelyn Quigley 1-0, Ursula Jacob 0-7 (0-2f), Katie Kelly 0-5 (0-1f), Michelle O'Leary, Una Leacy 0-1 each		Michelle Quilty 1-4 (03f), Aoife Neary 0-3 (0-2f), Sarah Anne Quinlan, Kelly Hamilton 0-1 each

June 26, 2011	Cork	2-14 – 0-8	Galway	Pearse Stadium, Galway
	Jennifer O'Leary 2-8 (1-4f), Katriona Mackey 0-3, Gemma O'Connor 0-1f, Linda Dorgan, Joanne Casey 0-1 each		Orla Kilkenny 0-2, Niamh Kilkenny 0-2f, Therese Maher, Aislinn Connolly 0-1f each, Noreen Coen, Veronica Curtin 0-1 each

July 2, 2011	Wexford	3-12 – 0-9	Clare	Cusack Park, Ennis
	Evelyn Quigley 2-0, Ursula Jacob 1-3 (0-1f), Katrina Parrock 0-4, Una Leacy 0-2, Katie Kelly, Bríd Gordon 0-1 each)		laire McMahon 0-7 (0-5f, 0-1 from a 45), Deidre Murphy 0-2, [hloe Morey 0-1

July 2, 2011	Kilkenny	4-8 – 0-12	Tipperary	The Ragg
	Michelle Quilty 1-4 (0-2f), Áine Fahy 1-1, Shelly Farrell, Aoife Neary 1-0 each, Denise Gaule 0-2, Ann Dalton 0-1		Claire Grogan 0-4 (0-2f, 0-1 from a 45), Jill Horan 0-3, Noren Flanagan, Joanne Ryan 0-2 each, Cora Hennessy 0-1

July 2, 2011	Galway	1-25 – 2-4	Offaly	Pearse Stadium, Galway
	Martina Conroy 1-7 (1-6f), Sandra Tannian 0-4, Brenda Hanney, Noreen Coen 0-3 each, Aislinn Connolly 0-3 (0-1f, 0-1 from a 45), Tare Rutledge 0-2, Niamh Kilkenny, Orla Kilkenny, Veronica Curtin 0-1 each		Elaine Dermody 1-3f, Marian Crean]1-0, Siobhan Flannery 0-1

July 2, 2011	Cork	4-17 – 0-4	Dublin	Sarsfields, Glanmire
	Joanne Casey 2-1, Denise Cronin 1-2, Katriona Mackey 1-1, Jennifer O'Leary 0-6 (0-4f) Eimer O'Sullivan, Gemma O'Connor 0-3 each, Orla Cotter 0-1		Louise O'Hara0-2 from a 45, Mairi Moynihan, Alison Maguire 0-1 each

July 9, 2011	Galway	2-18 – 0-6	Dublin	Portmarnock Naomh Mearnóg
	Veronica Curtin 1-3, Brenda Hanney 0-5, Aislinn Connolly 1-0, Niamh Kilkenny 0-3 (0-2f), Orla Kilkenny 0-2, Martina Conroy 0-2f, Jessica Gill, Finola Keely, Noreen Coen 0-1 each		Alison Maguire 0-3f, Ciara Durkan, Áine Fanning, Sara Ryan 0-1 each

July 9, 2011	Kilkenny	2-15 – 2-8	Clare	Nowlan Park
	Denise Gaule 0-6, Aoife Neary 0-5 (04f), Michelle Quilty 0-3, Áine Fahy, Grace Walsh 1-0 each, Ann Dalton 0-1		[laire McMahon 0-6f, [hloe Morey 1-1f, Naomi Carroll 1-0, Fiona Lafferty 0-1

July 9, 2011	Cork	6-27 – 0-10	Offaly	St Brendan's Park, Birr
	Katriona Mackey 2-4, Joanne Casey 1-3 (0-1 from a 45), Jennifer O'Leary 0-6 (03f), Sile Burns, Gemma O'Connor 1-2 each, Linda Dorgan 1-0, Julia White, Denise Cronin 0-3 each, Orla Cotter 0-2, Marie Walsh, Eimer O'Sullivan 0-1 each		Elaine Dermody 0-3 (0-1f), Arlene Watkins 0-3, Tina Hannon, Siobhan Flannery 0-2 each

July 9, 2011	Wexford	5-11 - 0-10	Tipperary	The Ragg
	Una Leacy 2-2, Ursula Jacob 1-6, (0-4f, 0-1 from a 45), Lenny Holohan, Evelyn Quigley 1-1 each, Katrina Parrock 0-1		Jill Horan, Cora Hennessy 0-2 each, Claire Grogan 0-2f, Noren Flanagan, Joanne Ryan, Amy Kennedy, Julie McGrath 0-1 each

July 16, 2011	Wexford	3-19 – 1-9	Offaly	Wexford Park
	Una Leacy 2-0, Katrina Parrock 1-4, Ursula Jacob 0-6 (0-2f), Katie Kelly 0-4 (0-1f), Lenny Holohan 0-3, Mary Leacy, Michelle O'Leary 0-1 each		Siobhan Flannery 1-1, Elaine Dermody 0-6 (0-4f, 0-2 from a 45), Arlene Watkins, Tina Hannon 0-1 each

July 16, 2011	Cork	0-13 – 1-7	Tipperary	Cork Institute of Technology, Bishopstown
	Jennifer O'Leary 0-3 (0-1f), Joanne Casey, Katriona Mackey 0-2 each, Sile Burns, Julia White, Orla Cotter, Denise Cronin, Eimer O'Sullivan, Gemma O'Connor 0-1 each		Cora Hennessy 1-0, Jill Horan 0-4, Joanne Ryan, Sarah Fryday, Michelle Shortt 0-1 each

July 16, 2011	Clare	3-10 – 1-8	Dublin	Cusack Park, Ennis
	Fiona Lafferty1-2, Naomi Carroll 1-1, Deidre Murphy1-0, [laire McMahon0-5 (0-4f, 0-1 from a 45), Sinéad O'Loughlin, Kate Lynch 0-1 each		Amy Murphy 1-0, Aisling Carolan 0-4, Elaine Gallery 0-2f, Alison Maguire 0-1f, Sara Ryan0-1

July 16, 2011	Galway	0-12 – 0-9	Kilkenny	Duggan Park, Ballinasloe
	Sandra Tannian 0-3, Niamh Kilkenny 0-2f, Orla Kilkenny Brenda Hanney 0-2 each, Susan Earner 0-1pen, Aislinn Connolly, Veronica Curtin 0-1 each		Ann Dalton 0-4, Aoife Neary 0-4 (0-3f, 0-1 from a 45), Denise Gaule 0-1

July 23, 2011	Kilkenny	2-16 – 1-13	Cork	Jenkinstown
	Michelle Quilty 1-3, Marie Dorgan 0-5, Aoife Neary 0-4 (0-2f), Edel Maher 1-0, Ann Dalton 0-2, Áine Fahy, E Aylward 0-1 each		Sile Burns 1-6 (1-4f, 0-1 from a 45), Orla Cotter 0-3 (0-2f), Eimer O'Sullivan 0-2, Gemma O'Connor, Katriona Mackey 0-1 each

July 23, 2011	Wexford	1-16 – 0-9	Dublin	Portmarnock Naomh Mearnóg
	Ursula Jacob 0-8 (0-6f, 0-1 from a 45), Una Leacy 0-4, Evelyn Quigley 1-0, Michelle O'Leary 0-3, Fiona Kavanagh 0-1		Alison Maguire, Sara Ryan 0-3 each, (0-2f each), Louise O'Hara 0-2 (0-1 from a 45), Ciara Durkan0-1

July 23, 2011	Offaly	3-12 – 1-14	Clare	St Brendan's Park, Birr
	Siobhan Flannery 1-2, Elaine Dermody0-5 (0-3f, 0-1 from a 45), Karen Nugent 1-1, Marian Crean 1-0, Tina Hannon 0-2, Aoife Kelly, Arlene Watkins 0-1 each		[hloe Morey 0-5, (0-3f, 0-1 from a 45), [laire McMahon 0-4 (0-1 from a 45), Sinéad O'Loughlin 1-0, Naomi Carroll 0-2, Kate Lynch, Sharon McMahon, Fiona Lafferty 0-1 each

July 23, 2011	Galway	3-20 – 1-11	Tipperary	The Ragg
	Tara Rutledge 1-2, Martina Conroy 1-1, Niamh Kilkenny 1-0, Aislinn Connolly 0-4 (0-1f), Veronica Curtin 0-3 (0-1f), Sandra Tannian 0-3, Jessica Gill 0-3(0-2f), Orla Kilkenny 0-2, Finola Keely, Brenda Hanney 0-1 each		Jill Horan 0-4, Cora Hennessy 0-4 (0-3f), Rose Kenneally1-0, Julie McGrath, Ali Lonergan, Joanne Ryan 0-1 each

==== Cross table ====
Team	Cl	Co	D	G	K	O	T	W	Pts
Clare	–	0	2	0	0	0	2	0	4
Cork	2	–	2	2	0	2	2	0	10
Dublin	0	0	–	0	0	0	0	0	0
Galway	2	0	2	–	2	2	2	2	12
Kilkenny	2	2	2	0	–	2	2	0	10
Offaly	2	0	2	0	0	–	0	0	4
Tipperary	0	0	2	0	0	2	–	0	4
Wexford	2	2	2	0	2	2	2	–	12

==== Table ====
Team	Pld	W	D	L	F	A	Diff	Pts
Galway	7	6	0	1	9-107	6-60	+56	12
Wexford	7	6	0	1	13-95	5-68	+51	12
Cork	7	5	0	2	17-108	3-69	+81	10
Kilkenny	7	5	0	2	15-86	7-72	+38	10
Clare	7	2	0	5	8-70	13-81	–28	4
Tipperary	7	2	0	5	8-75	14-89	–32	4
Offaly	0	2	0	5	11-75	18-130	–76	4
Dublin	7	0	0	7	2-55	17-100	–90	0

=== Final stages ===
August 13, 2011
Semi-Final

Galway	2-13 – 2-7	Kilkenny
Niamh Kilkenny 0-8 (4f), Brenda Hanney 1-2, Tara Ruttledge 1-0, Aislinn Connolly, Noreen Coen, Veronica Curtin 0-1		Aoife Neary 0-5 (5f), Asling Dunphy 1-1, Edel Maher 1-0, Shelly Farrell 0-1

Nowlan Park Attendance 5, 100

August 13, 2011
Semi-Final

Wexford	2-11 – 1-9	Cork
Ursula Jacob 1-6 (5f), Katrina Parrock 1-1, Kate Kelly 0-2, Deirdre Codd, Lenny Holohan 0-1 each.		Katriona Mackey 1-2, Jennifer O'Leary 0-3 (3f), Gemma O'Connor 0-2, Orla Cotter, Sile Burns 0-1 (f) each

Nowlan Park

September 11
Final
14:00 IST

Wexford	2-7 – 1-8	Galway
Ursula Jacob 1-5 (0-4f); Una Leacy 1-0 (pen); Josie Dwyer, Lenny Holohan 0-1 each.		Tara Ruttledge 1-1; Aislinn Connolly 0-2 (1f); Veronica Curtin, Martina Conroy, Noreen Coen, Niamh Kilkenny ('45'), Orla Kilkenny 0-1 each.

Croke Park, Dublin
Attendance: 14,974
Referee: Mike O'Kelly (Cork)

Wexford	Galway

WEXFORD:
GK	1	Mags D'Arcy (St Martin's)
RCB	2	Claire O'Connor (Rathnure)
FB	3	Catherine O’Loughlin (Monageer-Boolavogue)
LCB	4	Karen Atkinson (Oulart-The Ballagh) (substituted off) 60+3'
RWB	5	Noeleen Lambert (St Martin's)
CB	6	Mary Leacy (Oulart-The Ballagh)
LWB	7	Aoife O'Connor (Rathnure)
MF	8	Deirdre Codd (Duffry Rovers) (substituted off) 54'
MF	9	Josie Dwyer (Ferns) 0-1
RWF	10	Kate Kelly (St Ibar's)
CF	11	Una Leacy (Oulart-The Ballagh) 1-0 (penalty)
LWF	12	Michelle O'Leary (Rathnure)
RCF	13	Lenny Holohan (Rathnure) 0-1 (substituted off) 56'
FF	14	Ursula Jacob (captain) (Oulart-The Ballagh) 1-5 (4 frees)
LCF	15	Katrina Parrock (St Ibar's)
Substitutes:
MF		Fiona Kavanagh (Oulart-The Ballagh) for Deirdre Codd (substituted on) 54'
RCF		Evelyn Quigley (Rathnure) for Lenny Holohan (substituted on) 56'
LCB		Ciara Storey (Oulart-The Ballagh) for Karen Atkinson (substituted on) 60+3'

Galway:
GK	1	Susan Earner (Meelick Eyrecourt)
RCB	2	Therese Manton (Mullagh)
FB	3	Sinéad Cahalan (Mullagh)
LCB	4	Lorraine Ryan (Killimordaly)
RWB	5	Ann Marie Hayes (Killimor)
CB	6	Therese Maher (Athenry)
LWB	7	Heather Cooney (St Thomas)
MF	8	Niamh Kilkenny (Pearses) 0-1
MF	9	Ann Marie Starr (Killimor)
RWF	10	Noreen Coen (Athenry) 0-1
CF	11	Martina Conroy (Killimordaly) 0-1
LWF	12	Aislinn Connolly (Castlegar) 0-2
RCF	13	Tara Ruttledge (Portumna) 1-1
FF	14	Brenda Hanney (captain) (Killimor)
LCF	15	Veronica Curtin (Kinvara) 0-1
Substitutes:
LCF		Orla Kilkenny (Pearses) 0-1 for Veronica Curtin (substituted on) 39'

MATCH RULES

- 60 minutes
- Replay if scores level
- Maximum of 5 substitutions

== Top scorers ==
- Ursula Jacob Wexford 4–59
- Elaine Dermody Offaly 1–42
- Jennifer O'Leary Cork 2–38
- Michelle Quilty Kilkenny 5–26
- Claire McMahon Clare 0–38
- Veronica Curtin Galway 5–16
- Jill Horan Tipperary 1–23
- Alison Maguire Dublin 0–16

== Championship statistics ==
- Widest winning margin: 35 points
  - Cork 6-27 : 0-10 Offaly
- Most goals in a match: 6
  - Kilkenny 4-17 : 2-11 Offaly
  - Cork 6-27 : 0-10 Offaly
- Most points in a match: 37
  - Cork 6-27 : 0-10 Offaly
- Most goals by one team in a match: 6
  - Cork 6-27 : 0-10 Offaly
- Most points by one team in a match: 27
  - Cork 6-27 : 0-10 Offaly

Preceded by All-Ireland Senior Camogie Championship 2010	All-Ireland Senior Camogie Championship; 1932 – present	Succeeded by All-Ireland Senior Camogie Championship 2012
