= 2003 National Camogie League =

Camogie tournament

National Camogie League 2003
Winners
- Champions: Cork (12th title)

Runners-up
- Runners-up: Tipperary

The 2003 National Camogie League is a competition in the women's team field sport of camogie, and was won by Cork, who defeated Tipperary in the final, played at Páirc Uí Rinn.

== Arrangements ==
Tipperary defeated Antrim and Dublin, and had a walkover from Derry and defeated Kilkenny to reach the final. Cork had a tougher draw, but defeated Galway, Wexford, Limerick and Kilkenny.

== The Final ==
The teams were level on six occasions during the final. Cork’s superior fitness won them the final, with a late quartet of points. Fiona O'Driscoll contributed a personal total of 2-5. Tipperary did not have a single wide during the hour. Cork had five, four of them in the first half. Tipperary reversed the result in the All-Ireland final, the third time they had done so in a four-year period.

== Division 2 ==
The Junior National League, known since 2006 as Division Two, was won by Galway who defeated Armagh in the final.

=== Final stages ===
Final

| Cork | 3-10 – 2-12 | Tipperary |

Páirc Uí Rinn

| Cork | Tipperary |

Cork:
| GK | 1 | Ger Casey (Inniscarra) |
| RCB | 2 | Joanne Callaghan (Cloughduv) |
| FB | 3 | Denise Cronin |
| LCB | 4 | Stephanie Delea (Cloughduv) (Capt) |
| RWB | 5 | Paula O'Connor (Newtownshandrum) |
| CB | 6 | Mary O’Connor (Killeagh) |
| LWB | 7 | Gemma O'Connor (St Finbarr's) |
| MF | 8 | Vivienne Harris (Bishopstown) |
| MF | 9 | Rachel Maloney (Courcey Rovers) |
| RWF | 10 | Colette Desmond |
| CF | 11 | Una O'Donoghue (Cloughduv) |
| LWF | 12 | Jennifer O'Leary (Barryroe) |
| RCF | 13 | Orlaith O'Sullivan (St Finbarr's) |
| FF | 14 | Ciara Healy |
| LCF | 15 | Fiona O'Driscoll (Fr O’Neill’s) |
Substitutes:
| MF | | Sarah Hayes (Rockbán) for Paula O’Connor (substituted in) 28' |
| RWF | | Paula O'Connor (Newtownshandrum) for Healy (substituted in) 28' |

Tipperary:
| GK | 1 | Paula Ryan (Toomevara) |
| RCB | 2 | Meadhbh Corcoran (Moycarkey-Borris) |
| FB | 3 | Una O'Dwyer (Cashel) |
| LCB | 4 | Sheena Howard (Burgess) |
| RWB | 5 | Sinéad Nealon (Burgess) |
| CB | 6 | Ciara Gaynor (Burgess) 0-1 (free) |
| LWB | 7 | Suzanne Kelly (Toomevara) |
| MF | 8 | Angie McDermott (Kildangan) |
| MF | 9 | Therese Brophy (Burgess) |
| RWF | 10 | Michelle Shortt (Drom-Inch) 0-1 |
| CF | 11 | Noelle Kennedy (Toomevara) 0-6 |
| LWF | 12 | Joanne Ryan (Drom-Inch) 0-1 |
| RCF | 13 | Eimear McDonnell (Burgess) 1-0 |
| FF | 14 | Deirdre Hughes (Toomevara) 1-1 |
| LCF | 15 | Claire Grogan (Cashel) 0-2 |
Substitutes:
| MF | | Philly Fogarty (Cashel) for Brophy (substituted in) 28' |
| RWF | | Louise Young for Shortt (substituted in) 28' |

| Preceded by National Camogie League 2002 | National Camogie League; 1977 – present | Succeeded by National Camogie League 2004 |
