= Ann Marie Starr =

Irish camogie player

Personal information
- Native name: Áine Máire Ní Starr (Irish)
- Born: 1991 (age 34–35) Galway, Ireland

Sport
- Sport: Camogie
- Position: Midfield
Club
- Years: Club
- 14: Killimor
Inter-county**
Years	County	Apps (scores)
	Galway	?
- **Inter County team apps and scores correct as of (16:31, 30 June 2011 (UTC)).

Ann Marie Starr (born 1992) is a camogie player, a member of the Galway senior panel that unsuccessfully contested the All Ireland finals of 2010 and 2011 against Wexford.

== Other awards ==
All Ireland Club Championship 2011. Minor club title, Connacht schools medal 2009.
