= Noreen Coen =

Personal information
- Born: 1993 (age 32–33) Galway, Ireland

Sport
- Sport: Camogie
- Position: Right corner forward
Club*
Years	Club	Apps (scores)
	Athenry	?
Inter-county**
Years	County	Apps (scores)
	Galway	?
- * club appearances and scores correct as of (16:31, 30 June 2011 (UTC)). **Inter County team apps and scores correct as of (16:31, 30 June 2011 (UTC)).

Noreen Coen is a camogie player, a member of the Galway senior panel that unsuccessfully contested the All Ireland finals of 2010 and 2011 against Wexford, All Ireland winner 2013, 2019,2021

== Other awards ==
All Ireland Minor 2004.
