= Tannian =

Tannian is a surname. Notable people with the surname include:

- Iarla Tannian (born 1984), Irish hurler centre back
- Sandra Tannian, Irish camogie player
