= Joanne Ryan =

Joanne Ryan may refer to:

- Joanne Ryan (camogie), camogie player
- Joanne Ryan (EastEnders), fictional character
- Joanne Ryan (politician) (born 1961), member for the Division of Lalor
