= Karen Atkinson =

Karen Atkinson may refer to:

- Karen Atkinson (netball) (born 1978), English international netball player
- Karen Atkinson (camogie) (born 1986), Irish camogie player
- Karen Atkinson (Dynasty character)
