= Evelyn Quigley =

Irish camogie player

Personal information
- Native name: Eibhlín Ní Choigligh (Irish)
- Born: 30 December 1981 (age 44) Wexford, Ireland

Sport
- Sport: Camogie
- Position: Right half forward
Clubs*
Years	Club	Apps (scores)
	Rathnure; Fr. Murphy's	?
Inter-county**
Years	County	Apps (scores)
	Wexford	?
Inter-county titles
- All-Irelands: 3
- * club appearances and scores correct as of (16:31, 30 Sept 2011 (UTC)). **Inter County team apps and scores correct as of (16:31, 30 Sept 2011 (UTC)).

Evelyn Quigley is a camogie player, winner of All-Ireland Senior medals in 2007, 2010 and 2011.

== Family background ==
Evelyn is daughter of Eileen and Dan Quigley, Wexford's All-Ireland winning Senior hurling captain of 1968. She spent some time in London where she lined out with the Fr. Murphy's club, and also with the county team in the All Ireland Junior championship.

== Other awards ==
National Camogie League medals in 2009, 2010 and 2011; Leinster Senior 2011, 2010, 2004, 2003, 2001, 2000, 1999; Leinster U18 1998, 1997; Leinster Junior 2004, 2003. Winner of All-Ireland Senior club medal in 1995; three Leinster Senior Club 1995, 1996, 2000; Club Senior 1995, 1996, 1999, 2000, 2008; London Club Senior 2007; three Senior 'B' Club 2002, 2005, 2006; Leinster Under-18 1997, 1998; Leinster Senior 1999, 2000, 2001, 2003, 2004; Leinster Junior 2003, 2004; Ashbourne Cup with WIT 2001.
