= Connacht GAA =

Provincial council of the Gaelic Athletic Association

- Irish: Connachta
- Location: West
- Number of counties: 5
- Province colours: White Blue
- Major grounds: Dr Hyde Park, Roscommon; MacHale Park, Castlebar; Pearse Stadium, Galway

Most All-Ireland titles
- Hurling: Galway (4)
- Football: Galway (9)

Most provincial titles
- Hurling: Galway (46)
- Football: Galway (47)

Interprovincial Championship wins
- Hurling: 11
- Football: 10

Standard kit
- Regular kit

Connacht GAA (Irish: Cumann Lúthchleas Gael Chonnacht) or formally the Connacht Provincial Council of the Gaelic Athletic Association is the governing body for Gaelic games that are played in the province of Connacht, Ireland. It performs a supervisory and appeal role for the five County Boards within the province (listed below). Anomalously, it also exercises its functions for an additional two county boards that are not located in the province: London and New York. Teams from these administrative areas play in the Connacht Senior Football Championship.

== County boards ==
- Galway
- Leitrim
- Mayo
- Roscommon
- Sligo

== Football ==
=== Provincial team ===
The Connacht provincial football team represents the province of Connacht in Gaelic football. The team competes in the Railway Cup.

==== Players ====
Players from the following county teams represent Connacht: Galway, Leitrim, Mayo, Roscommon and Sligo.

=== Competitions ===
==== Inter-county ====
Competition	Year	Champions	Title	Runners-up	Next edition
Connacht Senior Football Championship	2026	Roscommon	25th	Galway	2027
Connacht Under-20 Football Championship	2026	Roscommon	12th	Mayo	2027
Connacht Minor Football Championship	2026	Roscommon	16th	Galway	2027
FBD Insurance League	2026	Galway	11th	Mayo	2027
Inactive competitions
Connacht Junior Football Championship	2019	Galway	22nd	Mayo	TBD

==== Club ====
Competition	Year	Champions	Title	Runners-up	Next edition
Connacht Senior Club Football Championship	2022	Moycullen	1st	Tourlestrane	2023
Connacht Intermediate Club Football Championship	2022	Dunmore MacHales	1st	St Dominic’s	2023
Connacht Junior Club Football Championship	2022	Clifden	1st	St. Ronan's	2023

== Hurling ==
=== Provincial team ===
The Connacht provincial hurling team represents the province of Connacht in hurling. The team competes in the Railway Cup.

==== Players ====
The Connact provincial team usually consists of 14 or 15 Galway players and perhaps one or two from the other counties.

=== Competitions ===
==== Inter-county ====
Competition	Year	Champions	Title	Runners-up	Next edition
Connacht Senior Hurling Championship	1999	Galway	25th	Roscommon	TBD
Connacht Intermediate Hurling Championship	2015	Roscommon	4th	Mayo	TBD
Connacht Junior Hurling Championship	2004	Mayo	3rd	Sligo	TBD
Connacht Under-21 Hurling Championship	2005	Galway	5th		TBD
Connacht Minor Hurling Championship	1989	Galway	26th	Roscommon	TBD
Connacht Senior Hurling League	2023	Galway	1st	Roscommon	2024
Connacht Senior Hurling Shield	2023	New York	1st	Leitrim	2024

There is currently no Connacht hurling championship but the Connacht GAA board has had Senior and Junior Hurling Championships in the past. The game is very strong in Galway but much weaker in the other four counties of the province.

==== Club ====
Competition	Year	Champions	Title	Runners-up	Next edition
Connacht Senior Club Hurling Championship	2007	Portumna	3rd	Ballina	TBD
Connacht Intermediate Club Hurling Championship	2022	Tooreen	4th	Killimor	2023
Connacht Junior Club Hurling Championship	2022	Easkey Sea Blues	1st	Ballygar	2023

=== Grades ===
Championship	County team
Leinster SHC	Galway
Joe McDonagh Cup	None
Christy Ring Cup	Mayo
Christy Ring Cup	Sligo
Nicky Rackard Cup	Roscommon
Lory Meagher Cup	Leitrim

== Camogie ==
=== Gael Linn Cup ===
The Connacht camogie team won the premier representative competition in the women's team field sport of camogie, the Gael Linn Cup on four occasions in 1973, 1974, 2000 and 2008.

=== Gael Linn Trophy ===
The Connacht provincial junior camogie team has won the Gael Linn Trophy on four occasions in 1981, 1995, 2006 and 2009.
