= Martina Conroy =

Personal information
- Native name: Martina Ní Chuana (Irish)
- Born: Galway, Ireland

Sport
- Sport: Camogie
- Position: Full forward
Club*
Years	Club	Apps (scores)
	Killimor	?
Inter-county**
Years	County	Apps (scores)
	Galway	?
- * club appearances and scores correct as of (16:31, 30 Sept 2011 (UTC)). **Inter County team apps and scores correct as of (16:31, 30 Sept 2011 (UTC)).

Martina Conroy is a camogie player, a member of the Galway team that contested the All Ireland finals of 2010 and 2011,

== Other awards ==
All Ireland Club Championship 2011, All Ireland Intermediate 2009, Junior Gael Linn Cup 2007, All Ireland Minor 2004.
