= 2010 All-Ireland Senior Camogie Championship =

Camogie championship

All-Ireland Senior Camogie Championship 2010
Championship details
- Dates: 12 June - 12 September 2010
- Teams: 7

All-Ireland champions
- Winners: Wexford (5th win)
- Captain: Una Leacy
- Manager: JJ Doyle

All-Ireland runners-up
- Runners-up: Galway
- Captain: Therese Maher
- Manager: Noel Finn

Championship statistics
- Matches played: 24

The 2010 All-Ireland Senior Camogie Championship—known as the Gala All-Ireland Senior Camogie Championship for sponsorship reasons—is the high point of the 2010 season in the sport of camogie. It commenced on June 13, 2010, and ended with the final between Galway and Wexford on 12 September 2010 which Wexford won by 1-12 to 1-10. Seven teams compete in the Senior Championship out of twenty-seven who competed overall in the Senior, Intermediate and Junior Championships.

== Structure ==
The seven teams played one another once, and received 2 points for a win, 1 point for a draw. The top four teams then contested the semi-finals, in which both 2009 finalists were defeated, defending champions Cork by Galway by one point in a replay and 2009 finalists Kilkenny by National Camogie League 2010 champions Wexford.

== Finals ==
For the first time since 2006 the finals did not share a billing with the All-Ireland Under 21 Hurling Championship. Instead the All Ireland Senior, Intermediate, and Junior championship finals were held on the same day.

== Galway Anomaly ==
When Galway beat Wexford 1-8 to 0-10 in the group stages only to lose the final 1-12 to 1-10, it was the third time in the five years since the championship moved from a knockout system to a round-robin format in 2006 that the runners-up defeated the eventual champions in the group stages.

== Fixtures ==
=== Group stage ===
June 12, 2010

| Cork | 1-16 – 0-15 | Tipperary |

Thurles

June 12, 2010

| Kilkenny | 1-14 – 1-11 | Galway |

Nowlan Park, Kilkenny

June 12, 2010

| Clare | 2-10 – 0-9 | Dublin |

Blakestown

June 19, 2010

| Wexford | 7-15 – 0-3 | Dublin |

Wexford Park

June 19, 2010

| Galway | 1-19 – 2-7 | Tipperary |

Ballinasloe

June 19, 2010

| Kilkenny | 0-13 – 2-6 | Cork |

Páirc Uí Rinn

June 26, 2010

| Cork | 1-23 – 1-6 | Dublin |

Portmarnock Naomh Mearnóg

June 26, 2010

| Tipperary | 1-12 – 1-9 | Clare |

Corofin

June 26, 2010

| Galway | 1-8 – 0-10 | Wexford |

Kenny Park, Athenry

July 3, 2010

| Kilkenny | 2-18 - 3-12 | Tipperary |

Nowlan Park, Kilkenny

July 3, 2010

| Galway | 1-14 – 0-11 | Cork |

Kenny Park, Athenry

July 4, 2010

| Wexford | 2-17 – 1-5 | Clare |

Wexford Park, Wexford

July 10, 2010

| Wexford | 2-17 – 0-14 | Tipperary |

The Ragg

July 10, 2010

| Kilkenny | 6-20 – 0-6 | Dublin |

Nowlan Park, Kilkenny

July 10, 2010

| Galway | 1-13 – 1-11 | Clare |

Corofin

July 17, 2010

| Cork | 2-10 - 1-10 | Wexford |

Páirc Uí Chaoimh

July 17, 2010

| Galway | 4-19 - 2-5 | Dublin |

Portmarnock Naomh Mearnóg

July 17, 2010

| Kilkenny | 4-14 - 0-14 | Clare |

Corofin

July 24, 2010

| Cork | 2-20 - 0-8 | Clare |

Páirc Uí Chaoimh

July 24, 2010

| Tipperary | 5-21 - 0-6 | Dublin |

The Ragg

July 24, 2010

| Wexford | 2-10 - 0-10 | Kilkenny |

Wexford Park

==== Cross table ====
| Team | Cl | Co | D | G | K | T | W | Pts |
|---|---|---|---|---|---|---|---|---|
| Clare | - | 0 | 2 | 0 | 0 | 0 | 0 | 2 |
| Cork | 2 | - | 2 | 0 | 0 | 2 | 2 | 8 |
| Dublin | 0 | 0 | - | 0 | 0 | 0 | 0 | 0 |
| Galway | 2 | 2 | 2 | - | 0 | 2 | 2 | 10 |
| Kilkenny | 2 | 2 | 2 | 2 | - | 2 | 0 | 10 |
| Tipperary | 2 | 0 | 2 | 0 | 0 | - | 0 | 4 |
| Wexford | 2 | 0 | 2 | 0 | 2 | 2 | - | 8 |

==== Table ====
| Team | Pld | W | D | L | F | A | Diff | Pts |
|---|---|---|---|---|---|---|---|---|
| Kilkenny | 6 | 5 | 0 | 1 | 13–89 | 7–69 | +45 | 10 |
| Galway | 6 | 5 | 0 | 1 | 9–84 | 6–58 | +35 | 10 |
| Wexford | 6 | 4 | 0 | 2 | 14–89 | 4-50 | +69 | 8 |
| Cork | 6 | 4 | 0 | 2 | 8-86 | 3-68 | +33 | 8 |
| Tipperary | 6 | 2 | 0 | 4 | 11-81 | 7-85 | +8 | 4 |
| Clare | 6 | 1 | 0 | 5 | 5-69 | 10-85 | -41 | 2 |
| Dublin | 6 | 0 | 0 | 6 | 3-35 | 25-118 | -149 | 0 |

=== Final stages ===
August 14, 2010
Semi-Final

| Wexford | 3-12 - 1-11 | Kilkenny |

Nowlan Park Attendance 3,082

August 14, 2010
Semi-Final

| Cork | 1-17 - 3-11 | Galway |

Nowlan Park

August 22, 2010
Semi-Final replay

| Galway | 0-10 - 0-9 | Cork |

Semple Stadium

September 12, 2010
Final
14:00 BST

| Wexford | 1-12 - 1-10 | Galway |

Croke Park, Dublin
Attendance: 17,120
Referee: Karl O'Brien (Dublin)

| Wexford | Galway |

WEXFORD:
| GK | 1 | Mags D'Arcy (St Martin's) |
| RCB | 2 | Claire O'Connor (Rathnure) |
| FB | 3 | Catherine O'Loughlin (Monageer-Boolavogue) |
| LCB | 4 | Karen Atkinson (Oulart-The Ballagh) (substituted off) 13' |
| RWB | 5 | Noeleen Lambert (St Martin's) |
| CB | 6 | Mary Leacy (Oulart-The Ballagh) |
| LWB | 7 | Aoife O'Connor (Rathnure) |
| MF | 8 | Deirdre Codd (Duffry Rovers) (substituted off) 53' |
| MF | 9 | Caroline Murphy (Ferns) |
| RWF | 10 | Kate Kelly (St Ibar’s) 0-2 |
| CF | 11 | Una Leacy (Oulart-The Ballagh) 0-1 |
| LWF | 12 | Michelle O'Leary (Rathnure) 0-1 |
| RCF | 13 | Katrina Parrock (St Ibar’s) 1-2 |
| FF | 14 | Ursula Jacob (Oulart-The Ballagh) 0-6 |
| LCF | 15 | Josie Dwyer Ferns} |
Substitutes:
| LCB | | Ciara Storey (Oulart-The Ballagh) for Karen Atkinson (substituted on) 13' |
| MF | | Lenny Holohan (Rathnure) for Deirdre Codd (substituted on) 53' |

Galway:
| GK | 1 | Susan Earner (Meelick Eyrecourt) |
| RCB | 2 | Sandra Tannian (St Thomas) |
| FB | 3 | Sarah Dervan (Mullagh) |
| LCB | 4 | Regina Glynn (Athenry) |
| RWB | 5 | Niamh Kilkenny (Pearses) |
| CB | 6 | Ann Marie Hayes (Killimor) |
| LWB | 7 | Therese Manton (Mullagh) |
| MF | 8 | Brenda Hanney (Killimor) |
| MF | 9 | Orla Kilkenny (Pearses) 0-1 |
| RWF | 10 | Caroline Murray (St Thomas) |
| CF | 11 | Therese Maher (Captain) (Athenry) |
| LWF | 12 | Aislinn Connolly (Castlegar) 1-6 |
| RCF | 13 | Tara Ruttledge (Portumna) |
| FF | 14 | Jessica Gill (Athenry) 0-1 |
| LCF | 15 | Veronica Curtin (Kinvara) 0-1 |
Substitutes:
| RWF | | Lorraine Ryan (Killimordaly) for Caroline Murray (substituted on) 28' |
| RCF | | Emma Kilkelly (Kinvara) for Tara Ruttledge (substituted on) 30' 0-1 |
| LWB | | Heather Cooney (St Thomas) for Therese Manton (substituted on) 39' |
| FF | | Niamh McGrath (Sarsfields) for Jessica Gill (substituted on) 56' |
| MF | | Aoife Lynskey (Ardrahan) for Orla Kilkenny (substituted on) 60' |

MATCH RULES

- 60 minutes
- Replay if scores level
- Maximum of 5 substitutions

== Gala Performance awards 2010 ==
- Gemma O'Connor Cork
- Brenda Hanney Galway
- Anna Geary Cork
- Aoife O'Connor Cork

== Gala All-Ireland Final Player of the Match ==
- Katrina Parrock Wexford

== Championship statistics ==
=== Scoring ===
- Championship including final stage
- Top Scorer
  - Aislinn Connolly Galway 6–58
- Widest winning margin: 43 points
  - Wexford 7–15 : 0–3 Dublin
- Most goals in a match: 7
  - Wexford 7–15 : 0–3 Dublin
- Most points in a match: 31
  - Cork 1-16 : 1-15 Tipperary
  - Wexford 2-17 : 0-14 Tipperary
- Most goals by one team in a match: 7
  - Wexford 7-15 : 0-3 Dublin
- Most points by one team in a match: 23
  - Cork 1-23 : 1-6 Dublin

| Preceded by All-Ireland Senior Camogie Championship 2009 | All-Ireland Senior Camogie Championship; 1932 – present | Succeeded by All-Ireland Senior Camogie Championship 2011 |
