= Emma Kilkelly =

Personal information
- Native name: Emma Nic Giolla Cheallaigh (Irish)
- Born: 13 January 1986 (age 40) Galway, kinvaraIreland

Sport
- Sport: Camogie
- Position: Central half forward
Club*
| Years | Club | Apps (scores) |
| | Kinvara | ? |
Inter-county**
| Years | County | Apps (scores) |
| | Galway | ? |
- * club appearances and scores correct as of (16:31, 30 June 2011 (UTC)). **Inter County team apps and scores correct as of (16:31, 30 June 2011 (UTC)).

Emma Kilkelly is a camogie player, a member of the Galway senior panel that unsuccessfully contested the All Ireland finals of 2010 and 2011 against Wexford,

== Other awards ==
1 Minor All- Ireland, one All Ireland Junior, one All Ireland Intermediate, Junior and Senior Connacht Colleges Titles.
