= Lenny Holohan =

Personal information
- Native name: Léan Ní hUallacháin (Irish)
- Born: 21 May 1985 (age 41) Wexford, Ireland

Sport
- Sport: Camogie
- Position: Forward
Club*
Years	Club	Apps (scores)
	Rathnure	?
Inter-county**
Years	County	Apps (scores)
	Wexford	?
Inter-county titles
- All-Irelands: 2
- * club appearances and scores correct as of (16:31, 30 Sep 2011 (UTC)). **Inter County team apps and scores correct as of (16:31, 30 Sep 2011 (UTC)).

Elaine 'Lenny' Holohan is a camogie player, winner of All-Ireland Senior medals in 2007, in 2010 and 2011.

== Other awards ==
- National Camogie League medals in 2009, 2010 and 2011
- Leinster Championship 1995, 1996, 1999, 2000, 2008, 2010, 2011
- Winner of All-Ireland Senior club medal in 1995
- Leinster Senior Club 1995, 1996, 2000
- Club Senior 1995, 1996, 1999, 2000, 2008 (player of the match)
- Senior 'B' Club 2002 (captain), 2005, 2006
- Leinster Under-14 1994; Leinster Under-16 1996
- Leinster Under-18 1997, 1998
- Leinster Senior 1999, 2000 (captain), 2001, 2003, 2004, 2007
- Played for Rest of Ireland against All-Ireland champions Tipperary in 2001
- Leinster Senior Colleges with Coláiste Bríde 1996, 1998, 1999; Purple and Gold Star 2008.

== Family background ==
Her twin sister Bernie played Intermediate for Wexford winning an All Ireland medal in 2011. The twins' father, Barney, was a selector on the All-Ireland 'B' winning Wexford Under-16 team in 2010.

She is married to the Duffrey Donkey.
