= Tara Ruttledge =

Irish camogie player

Personal information
- Native name: Teamhair Ní Mhaoildeirg (Irish)
- Born: 1991 (age 34–35) Galway, Ireland

Sport
- Sport: Camogie
- Position: Right corner forward
Club*
| Years | Club | Apps (scores) |
| | Portumna | ? |
Inter-county**
| Years | County | Apps (scores) |
| | Galway | ? |
- * club appearances and scores correct as of (16:31, 30 June 2011 (UTC)). **Inter County team apps and scores correct as of (16:31, 30 June 2011 (UTC)).

Tara Ruttledge (born 1991) is a camogie player, a member of the Galway senior panel that unsuccessfully contested the All Ireland finals of 2010 and 2011 against Wexford, She was an All-Star nominee in 2010.

== Other awards ==
All Ireland Intermediate medal 2009, Galway Minor Player of the Year 2008. Under 14, Minor and Junior Club titles, five Connacht Schools.
