= Deirdre Codd =

Irish camogie player

Personal information
- Native name: Deirdre Níc Óda (Irish)
- Nicknames: Frank, Deedo
- Born: 31 July 1986 (age 40) Wexford, Ireland

Sport
- Sport: Camogie
- Position: Midfield
Club*
Years	Club	Apps (scores)
	Duffry Rovers	?
Inter-county**
Years	County	Apps (scores)
2004	Wexford	?
Inter-county titles
- Leinster titles: icallireland= 4
- All Stars: 1
- * club appearances and scores correct as of (16:31, 30 Sept 2011 (UTC)). **Inter County team apps and scores correct as of (16:31, 30 Sept 2011 (UTC)).

Deirdre Codd is a camogie player whose senior debut was in 2004 versus Antrim. She was the winner of All Ireland senior medals in 2007 in 2010 2011, and 2012. Codd's mother, Ruth Hatton, represented Wexford Junior camogie team and her father, John, was a camogie referee.

== Other awards ==
She won National League medals in 2009, 2010 and 2011. She was an All Star nominee in 2005, 2007, 2009 All Star Nominee; Purcell Cup All Star 2008; Leinster Under-14 1999, 2000; Leinster Under-16 2000, 2002; Club Intermediate 2001, 2003 (captain); Club Senior 'B' 2009; Leinster and Winner of All-Ireland Senior medals at college level with Coláiste Bríde 2003, 2004; represented Ireland in second level Compromise Rules v. Scotland 2004; Leinster Senior 2004, 2007; Leinster Junior 2004; Purple and Gold Star 2008.
