= Josie Dwyer =

Irish camogie player

Personal information
- Native name: Seosamhín Ní Dhuibhir (Irish)
- Nickname: The Ferns Mammy
- Born: 2 November 1984 (age 41) Wexford, Ireland

Sport
- Sport: Camogie
- Position: Midfield
Club*
Years	Club	Apps (scores)
	Ferns	?
Inter-county**
Years	County	Apps (scores)
	Wexford	?
Inter-county titles
- All-Irelands: 2
- * club appearances and scores correct as of (16:31, 30 Sept 2011 (UTC)). **Inter County team apps and scores correct as of (16:31, 30 Sept 2011 (UTC)).

Josie Dwyer is a camogie player, winner of All-Ireland Senior medals in 2010 and 2011 She famously delivered the pass to Ursula Jacob which secured the 2011 All Ireland title for Wexford. She was an All-Star nominee in 2010.

== Other awards ==
National Camogie League medals in 2009, 2010 and 2011; National League Division one 2010, 2009; Leinster Championship 2004, 2009, 2010, 2011; Leinster Junior 2004, 2003; Leinster Under-16 2000; Leinster Under-16 2000; Leinster Junior 2003, 2004; Leinster Senior colleges with FCJ Bunclody) 2000; Club Junior 1998; Club Intermediate 2000; Purple and Gold Star 2008. Dwyer re-joined the squad in 2010 for the first time since 2006. Her brother, Tommy, has played with Wexford in all grades of hurling. She has played football with the county at all levels, including the All Ireland Intermediate final of 2007. A member of the Garda Siochana, she is based in Arklow town.
