= Jill Horan =

Irish camogie player

Personal information
- Born: County Tipperary, Ireland

Sport
- Sport: Camogie
- Position: Midfield
Club*
Years	Club	Apps (scores)
	Cashel	?
Inter-county**
Years	County	Apps (scores)
	Tipperary	?
- * club appearances and scores correct as of (16:31, 30 June 2011 (UTC)). **Inter County team apps and scores correct as of (16:31, 30 June 2011 (UTC)).

Jill Horan is an Irish camogie player, an All-Star winner and captain to the Tipperary team in 2011, when she was the player of the second and sixth rounds of the championship and a member of the Team of the Championship for 2011. With a total of 1-23 she was the seventh-highest-scoring player in the Senior Championship of 2011.

== Other Awards ==
She helped Cashel win the 2009 Club Championship. She was an All-Star nominee in 2010.
