= Sharon McMahon =

American law and government influencer

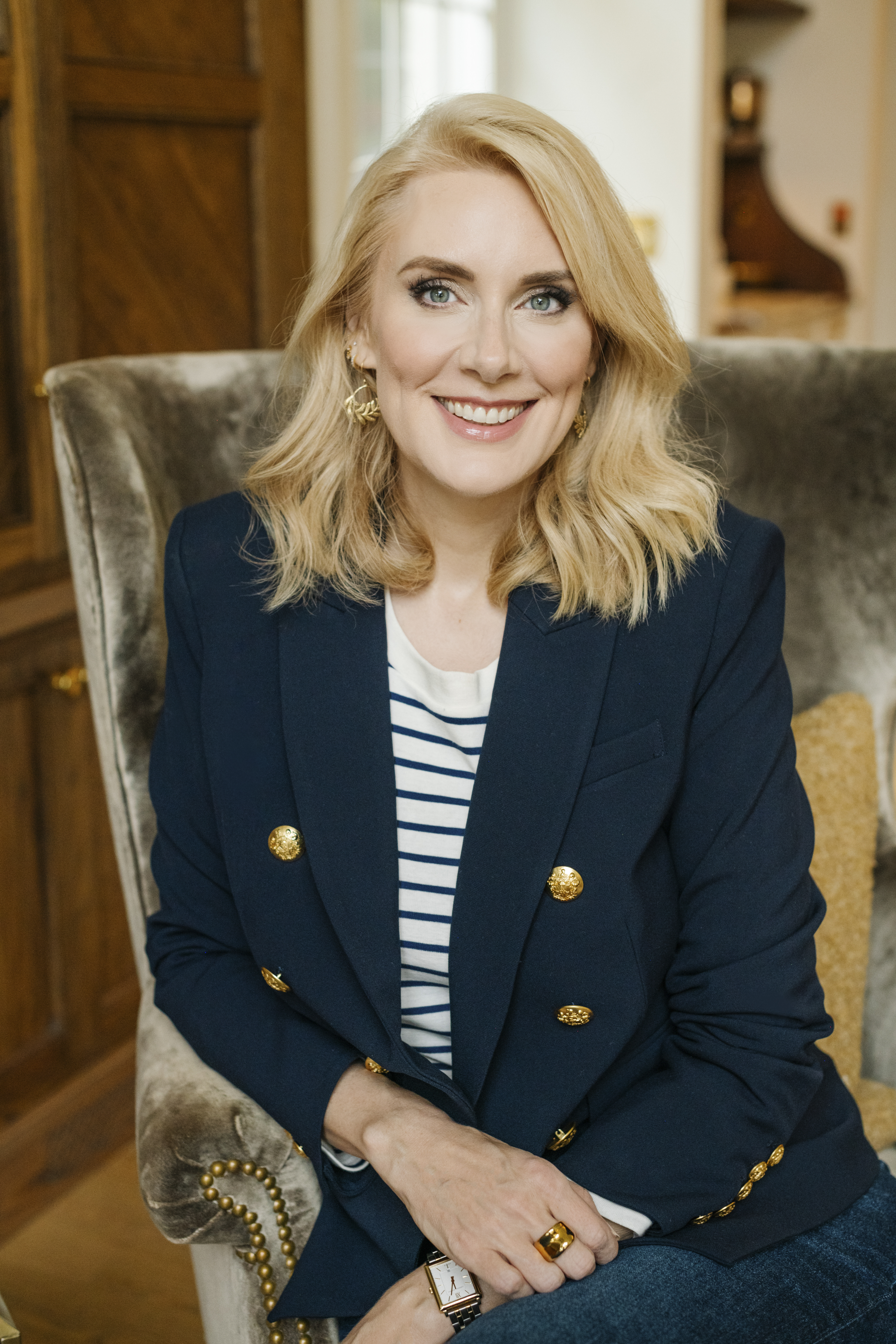
- Known for: Author
- Notable work: The Small and the Mighty; We Are Mighty
- Website: https://sharonmcmahon.com/

Sharon McMahon is an American author, educator, and podcaster. She has written two New York Times bestselling books, The Small and the Mighty (2024) and We Are Mighty (2026).

== Career ==
McMahon taught government and law in public schools in the suburbs of Washington, D.C. After years of teaching, McMahon began publishing politics-oriented content to her Instagram in September 2020 in response to what she saw as rising misinformation in her own social media feeds amidst the COVID-19 pandemic and 2020 election cycle.

In December 2020, McMahon launched her first giving campaign with the goal to raise $1,000 for a family in need. Instead, McMahon crowdfunded more than $125,000. In January 2021, McMahon gained media attention for organizing a letter-writing campaign to thank U.S. Capitol custodians cleaning up after the January 6 United States Capitol attack.

In July 2021, McMahon began hosting the podcast "Here's Where It Gets Interesting". The 400+ episodes are a mix of interviews with notable Americans and narrations shedding light on American history and civics, including topics ranging from the Prohibition, the Civil Rights Movement, World War II, and the Leo Frank case to the responsibilities of the electoral college, principles of democracy, and the functions and structure of US government. Podcast guests have included Sen. Mitt Romney, actor George Takei, actor Rainn Wilson, Heather Cox Richardson, Maria Bamford, and documentarians Ken Burns and Sarah Botstein.

== Awards ==
McMahon was recognized as Communicator of the Year by PRWeek and nominated as Best Social Creator at the 2022 Webby Awards. "Here's Where It Gets Interesting", the podcast, won a 2023 Webby Award for Best Writing and People's Voice.

== Other activity ==
McMahon is a founding partner of "Starts With Us", an organization that seeks to overcome division and polarization.

McMahon has also launched Government for Grownups, a workshop series about US history and government.

She is the author and founder of The Preamble, a news and history newsletter.

== Bibliography ==
- McMahon, Sharon (2024-09-24). The Small and the Mighty. Penguin. ISBN 978-0-593-54167-8.
- McMahon, Sharon (2026-05-19). We Are Mighty. ISBN 979-8-217-03333-1.
