= Ursula Jacob =

Irish camogie player

Personal information
- Native name: Ursula Íácób (Irish)
- Born: 7 September 1985 (age 41) Wexford, Ireland

Sport
- Sport: Camogie
- Position: Forward
Club
- Years: Club
- Oulart–The Ballagh
Club titles
- All-Ireland Titles: 2
Inter-county
- Years: County
- 2000-2015: Wexford
Inter-county titles
- Leinster titles: 10
- All-Irelands: 4
- All Stars: 4

Ursula Jacob is a camogie player, winner of All Star awards in 2010, 2011, 2012 and 2014. All-Ireland Senior medals in 2007, 2010 2011 and 2012, in 2011 she scored a dramatic 52nd-minute goal which changed the course of the All Ireland final and secured victory for Wexford. She was player of the match in Wexford's semi-final victory over Cork and a member of the Team of the Championship for 2011. With a total of 3–54 she was the highest scoring player in the Senior Championship of 2011.

== Family background ==
Ursula is sister of substitute goalkeeper, Helena, and of Wexford hurlers Michael and Rory. Their father, Mick, won a hurling All Star in 1972, while their mother, Breda (née McClean), played with Wexford in the All Ireland Junior camogie final of 1972 against Galway. Ursula started playing with the Wexford senior team at the age of 15.

== 2011 Final ==
Ursula captained the Wexford team in 2011. Eight out of 14 journalists at the final described her goal as among the best in the history of the game. TV analyst and three times All Ireland medalist Therese O'Callaghan described it as "a dream goal, as good a goal as you are likely to see." Former Galway hurling manager Cyril Farrell said during the course of his TV match commentary:

"That's as good a goal as you will see anywhere, a beautiful cross field ball from Josie Dwyer, fantastic catch, back towards the goal, turn on the left, bang in to the back of the net. You won't see better than that anywhere. Everything is just on precision, on the dot. Catches it, turns left handed, bang to the back of the net, brilliant score."

Galway manager Noel Finn said: "The goal came against the run of play. It was a sucker punch that late, they got their dander up. They were winning the breaks and when you’re on the back foot it is very hard to try and push on.

== 2012 Final ==
Ursula scored two goals and seven points against Cork, which led to her being awarded "Player of the Match" on The Sunday Game Live.

== Other awards ==
National Camogie League medals in 2009, 2010 and 2011; in 2010. She was an All Star nominee in 2005, 2007, 2008; Leinster Under-14 1999; Leinster Under-16 2000; All-Ireland Junior Colleges with Coláiste Bríde 2000; All-Ireland Senior Colleges with Coláiste Bríde 2003, 2004 (captain); Leinster Senior Colleges with Coláiste Bríde 1999, 2003, 2004 (captain); represented Ireland in second level Compromise Rules v. Scotland 2004; All-Ireland Colleges All Star 2004; Club Senior 2003, 2004, 2005, 2006, 2007, 2009; Leinster Club Senior 2009; Leinster Senior 2004; All-Ireland Freshers with WIT; Ashbourne Cup 2009, 2010 (captain); Ashbourne All Star 2009, 2010, 2011; two All-Ireland Féile na nGael 1998, 1999; All Ireland club sevens 2006, All Ireland Senior Club Title 2012.

== Protocol Precedent ==
The Irish Independent noted in their 2011 after match commentary:

"After lining up to greet the Taoiseach, the Wexford team, led by captain and eventual match-changer Ursula Jacob, turned left and came down along the line, shaking hands with all of their Galway opponents before trotting into position for the pre-match parade. It was a nice sporting gesture, surely one that would add greatly to the men's big days."
