= Heather Cooney =

Irish camogie player

Personal information
- Native name: Heather Ní Chuana (Irish)
- Born: 1989 (age 36–37) Galway, Ireland

Sport
- Sport: Camogie
- Position: Left half back
Club*
Years	Club	Apps (scores)
	St Thomas’s	?
Inter-county**
Years	County	Apps (scores)
	Galway	?
Inter-county titles
- All Stars: 2 (2015 & 2019)
- * club appearances and scores correct as of (16:31, 30 Sept 2011 (UTC)). **Inter County team apps and scores correct as of (16:31, 30 Sept 2011 (UTC)).

Heather Cooney is a camogie player, a member of the Galway senior panel that won two Senior All Ireland Camogie finals of 2013 and 2019. Heather also won 2 all stars at wing back in 2015 and 2019. Heather is from the St Thomas’ club and is a sister to the brothers Donal, Conor & Shane.

== Other awards ==
All Ireland Intermediate medal 2009.
