= Carina Roseingrave =

Irish camogie player

Personal information
- Native name: Cairenn Ní Rosingrábh (Irish)
- Born: County Clare, Ireland

Sport
- Sport: Camogie
- Position: Right corner forward
Club
- Years: Club
- Crusheen
Inter-county
- Years: County
- Clare

Carina Roseingrave is a camogie player from County Clare. She was a Camogie All Stars "Young Player of the Year" award winner in 2008.

She was a member of the Clare team that won the All-Ireland Junior Camogie Championship in 2008, scoring a goal in the final.
