= Therese Manton =

Irish camogie player

Personal information
- Native name: Treasa Ní Mhantáin (Irish)
- Born: 12 October 1987 (age 39) Galway, Ireland

Sport
- Sport: Camogie
- Position: Right corner back
Club*
Years	Club	Apps (scores)
	Mullagh	?
Inter-county**
Years	County	Apps (scores)
	Galway	?
- * club appearances and scores correct as of (16:31, 30 June 2011 (UTC)). **Inter County team apps and scores correct as of (16:31, 30 June 2011 (UTC)).

Therese Manton is a camogie player, a member of the Galway senior panel that unsuccessfully contested the All Ireland finals of 2010 and 2011 against Wexford.

== Other awards ==
All Ireland Club Championship 2011, Senior Gael Linn Cup 2008. two Ashbourne Cup with UCD 2007 2008, two Connacht Vocational School medals with Loughrea, Gael Linn Cup 2008, Pan Celtic with Mullagh 2007, Player of the year for St Brigid’s Vocational School 2006, Junior Connacht medals.
