= Lorraine Ryan =

Irish camogie player

Personal information
- Native name: Áine Ní Riain (Irish)
- Born: 19 June 1989 (age 37) Galway, Ireland

Sport
- Sport: Camogie
- Position: Left corner back
Club*
Years	Club	Apps (scores)
	Killimordaly	20
Inter-county**
Years	County	Apps (scores)
	Galway	?
- * club appearances and scores correct as of (16:31, 30 June 2011 (UTC)). **Inter County team apps and scores correct as of (16:31, 30 June 2011 (UTC)).

Lorraine Ryan is a camogie player, winner of an All Star award in 2011, a member of the Galway team which contested the 2010 and 2011 All Ireland finals and a member of the Team of the Championship for 2011.

She is a teacher at Coláiste Bhaile Chláir in Claregalway.

== Other awards ==
Senior Gael Linn Cup 2008, All Ireland Minor 2004. county minor title 2004, junior schools All-Ireland title with Presentation College Athenry, Club League, Championship and Connacht titles.
