= Karen Atkinson (camogie) =

Irish camogie player

Personal information
- Native name: Carin Nic Aidicín (Irish)
- Born: 25 November 1986 (age 39) Wexford, Ireland

Sport
- Sport: Camogie
- Position: Left Corner Back
Club
- Years: Club
- Oulart–The Ballagh
Club titles
- All-Ireland Titles: 2
Inter-county
- Years: County
- Wexford
Inter-county titles
- All-Irelands: 4

Karen Atkinson is a camogie player, winner of All-Ireland Senior Camogie Championship medals in 2007 2010 2011 and as All-Ireland winning captain in 2012. She was an All-Star nominee in 2010.

== Other awards ==
National Camogie League medals in 2009, 2010 and 2011; National League Division two 2009; Leinster Championship 2011 2010 2009; All Star nominee 2010 Ashbourne Cup 2009; three All-Ireland Féile na nGael 1998, 1999, 2000; Leinster Under-14 2000 (captain); Leinster Under-16 2002; Leinster and Winner of All-Ireland Senior medals at Colleges level with Coláiste Bríde 2003, 2004; Leinster Junior 2003, 2004; Leinster Senior 2004, 2007; Club Senior 2003, 2004, 2005, 2006, 2007, 2009; Leinster Club Senior 2009; All-Ireland club sevens 2006. Karen's sister, Colleen, was also on the Wexford panel and captained the winning Intermediate team in 2011.
