= Michelle O'Leary =

Irish camogie player

Michelle O’Leary
Personal information
- Native name: Michilín Ní Laoire (Irish)
- Born: 27 April 1980 (age 46) Wexford, Ireland

Sport
- Sport: Camogie
- Position: Right half forward
Club*
Years	Club	Apps (scores)
	Rathnure	?
Inter-county**
Years	County	Apps (scores)
	Wexford	?
Inter-county titles
- All-Irelands: 3
- * club appearances and scores correct as of (16:31, 30 Sept 2011 (UTC)). **Inter County team apps and scores correct as of (16:31, 30 Sept 2011 (UTC)).

Michelle O’Leary (born 27 April 1980) is a camogie player, winner of All-Ireland Senior medals in 2007, 2010 and 2011. She was an All Star nominee in 2008.

== Career ==
Michelle made her Senior championship debut at the age of 15, coming on along with Áine Codd in the All-Ireland semi-final defeat to Cork in Páirc Uí Rinn in 1995 making them the longest-serving duo on the 2011 All Ireland winning panel. Their colleagues that day included 2007 All Ireland winning manager, Stellah Sinnott, and selector, Ann Reddy.

== Other awards ==
National Camogie League medals in 2009, 2010 and 2011; All Ireland Under-16 1995; Leinster Championship 2009, 2010, 2011, 2007, 2004, 2003, 2001, 2000, 1999; Leinster U18 1998, 1997; Leinster Under-16 1996, 1995, 1994. All-Ireland Under-16 1995; Winner of All-Ireland Senior club medal in 1995; three Leinster Senior Club 1995, 1996, 2000; Club Senior 1995, 1996, 1999 (captain), 2000, 2008 (captain); three Senior 'B' Club 2002, 2005, 2006; Leinster Under-14 1993, 1994; Leinster Under-16 1994, 1995, 1996; Leinster Under-18 1997, 1998; Leinster Senior 1999, 2000, 2001, 2003, 2004, 2007; Junior Gael Linn Cup with Leinster 1999; Leinster Senior Colleges with Coláiste Bríde 1996, 1998 (captain); Purple and Gold Star 2008.
