= Ann Marie Hayes =

Camogie player

Personal information
- Native name: Áine Ní Aodha (Irish)
- Born: Galway, Ireland

Sport
- Sport: Camogie
Club*
Years	Club	Apps (scores)
	Killimor	?
Inter-county**
Years	County	Apps (scores)
	Galway	?
Inter-county titles
- All Stars: 2
- * club appearances and scores correct as of (16:31, 30 December 2009 (UTC)). **Inter County team apps and scores correct as of (16:31, 30 December 2009 (UTC)).

Ann Marie Hayes is a camogie player. She won camogie All Star awards in 2004, 2009 and 2011, and played in the 2008, 2010 and 2011 All Ireland finals. She was an All-Star nominee in 2010 and a member of the Team of the Championship for 2011.

== Other awards ==
Senior Gael Linn Cup 2008, Junior Gael Linn Cup 2007, All Ireland Intermediate 2004, Junior All Ireland 2003, All Ireland Minor 2000, three Schools Connacht medals, one School Football Connacht medal, one Ashbourne Shield medal.
