= Vivienne Harris (camogie) =

Irish camogie player

Personal information
- Native name: Bébhinn Ní hEarchaí (Irish)
- Born: Cork, Ireland

Sport
- Sport: Camogie
- Position: centre field
Clubs*
Years	Club	Apps (scores)
	=Bishopstown, St. Finbarrs	?
Inter-county**
Years	County	Apps (scores)
	Cork	?
Inter-county titles
- Munster titles: Multiple junior & senior medals
- All-Irelands: 5
- * club appearances and scores correct as of (16:31, 30 June 2010 (UTC)). **Inter County team apps and scores correct as of (16:31, 30 June 2010 (UTC)).

Vivienne Harris is a camogie player a member of Cork's All Ireland Camogie Championship winning team in 1995, 1997, 1998, 2002, and 2005.

== National League ==
She is the only player to have captained three successive winning teams in the National Camogie League 1995, 1996, 1997, 1998, 1999, 2000 and 2001. Striking up a successful partnership with Gemma O'Connor, she dominated midfield during the All Ireland finals of 2004 and 2005. She was a member of St. Finbarrs.
