= Aislinn Connolly =

Camogie player

Personal information
- Native name: Aislinn Ní Chonghaile (Irish)
- Born: Renmore Galway, Ireland

Sport
- Sport: Camogie
- Position: Full forward
Club*
Years	Club	Apps (scores)
	Castlegar	?
Inter-county**
Years	County	Apps (scores)
	Galway	?
- * club appearances and scores correct as of (16:31, 30 June 2010 (UTC)). **Inter County team apps and scores correct as of (16:31, 30 June 2010 (UTC)).

Aislinn Connolly is a camogie player who was an All Star winner in 2010 and 2011 and a member of the Team of the Championship for 2011. She played in the All Ireland finals of 2010 and 2011.

== Family background ==
She is the daughter of John Connolly, who featured in Galway’s breakthrough All Ireland victory of 1980.

== Career ==
She exploded on to the sporting scene in Galway’s All Ireland minor championship success of 2000. Having played as a sub in Galway’s narrowly unsuccessful team of 1999s she won player of the match as Galway beat Cork by 2-9 to 0-3 in Tullamore. She played on the University of Limerick team that won three Ashbourne Cup titles in a row in 2004, 2005, and 2006 She was nominated for an All Star award in 2009.
