= Sandra Tannian =

Irish camogie player

Personal information
- Native name: Sandra Ní Thanaidheáin (Irish)
- Born: 1980 (age 45–46) Galway, Ireland

Sport
- Position: Back
Club*
Years	Club	Apps (scores)
	St Thomas	?
Inter-county**
Years	County	Apps (scores)
	Galway	?
- * club appearances and scores correct as of (16:31, 30 June 2011 (UTC)). **Inter County team apps and scores correct as of (16:31, 30 June 2011 (UTC)).

Sandra Tannian is a camogie player, a member of the Galway senior panel that unsuccessfully contested the All Ireland finals of 2010 and 2011 against Wexford, She was an All-Star nominee in 2010.

== Other awards ==
Senior Gael Linn Cup 2008, Senior Gael Linn Cup 2000, Senior National League 2000, Junior All Ireland 1998, All Ireland Minor 1994, 1996, eight All Ireland Vocational Schools medals, one Purcell Cup, one National Camogie League, one club Intermediate, three North American titles with Éire Óg Boston.
