= Una Leacy =

Irish camogie player

Personal information
- Native name: Úna Léasaigh (Irish)
- Born: 17 May 1988 (age 38) Wexford, Ireland

Sport
- Sport: Camogie
- Position: Forward
Club*
| Years | Club | Apps (scores) |
| | Oulart–The Ballagh | ? |
Club titles
- All-Ireland Titles: 3
Inter-county**
| Years | County | Apps (scores) |
| | Wexford | ? |
Inter-county titles
- All-Irelands: 4
- All Stars: 3
- * club appearances and scores correct as of (16:31, 30 June 2011 (UTC)). **Inter County team apps and scores correct as of (22:17, 3 February 2022 (UTC)).

Una Leacy is a camogie player and winner of two All-Star awards. Leacy's first All-Star came in 2007, the year her two early goals helped Wexford win their first All-Ireland Senior Camogie Championship in 32 years, and her second in 2011. She won further All Ireland medals in 2010 and 2011.

== Family background ==
Her sister Mary Leacy won two All Star awards with Wexford. She is a daughter of Margaret (née O'Leary) who was selected at left half-back on the camogie team of the century. Margaret's successes include three All-Ireland Seniors with Wexford in 1968, '69 and '75; seven Gael Linn Cups with Leinster in 1965, 1968, 1969, 1970, 1971, 1972 and 1978; five All-Ireland Clubs, with Eoghan Ruadh (Dublin) in 1967 and with Buffers Alley (Wexford) in 1978, 1981, 1982 and 1983; Gaelic All Star award 1968; captain of the first Wexford team to win the National Camogie League in 1977-'78. She plays for Oulart–The Ballagh.

== Other awards ==
National League Division one 2009; All Star 2007; five All-Ireland Féile na nGael 1998, 1999, 2000, 2001, 2002 as captain (national record); Leinster Under-14 1999, 2000, 2001, 2002; Leinster Under-16 2002; Leinster and winner of All-Ireland Senior medals in Colleges with Coláiste Bríde in 2003, 2004, 2005; All-Ireland Junior Colleges in 2004 (captain); Leinster Junior 2003, 2004; Club Senior 2003, 2004, 2005, 2006, 2007, 2009; Leinster Club Senior 2009; Ashbourne Cup 2007, 2008; Leinster Senior 2007; shared 'Irish Independent/Jury's' sportstar of the week with her sister, Mary, after the 2007 Winner of All-Ireland Senior medals in final; Purple and Gold Star 2008.
