= Niamh Kilkenny =

Personal information
- Born: 1989 (age 36–37) Galway, Ireland

Sport
- Sport: Camogie
- Position: Midfield
Club*
Years	Club	Apps (scores)
	Pádraig Pearse's	?
Inter-county**
Years	County	Apps (scores)
	Galway	?
- * club appearances and scores correct as of (16:31, 30 June 2011 (UTC)). **Inter County team apps and scores correct as of (16:31, 30 June 2011 (UTC)).

Niamh Kilkenny (born 1989) is a camogie player, a member of the Galway senior panel that won the All Ireland Senior Camogie Championship in 2013,2019 & 2021 and unsuccessfully contested the All Ireland finals of 2010 and 2011 against Wexford, winner of All Star awards in 2010 and 2011 and a member of the Team of the Championship for 2011.

== Other awards ==
Kilkenny attended Holy Rosary College, Mountbellew, doing her Leaving Cert in 2007 and going on to study in NUI Galway. She won senior Gael Linn Cup 2008, All Ireland Minor 2004, Connacht schools title.
