= Aoife Neary =

Irish camogie player (born 1985)

Personal information
- Native name: Aoife Ní Náraigh (Irish)
- Born: 1985 (age 40–41) Kilkenny, Ireland

Sport
- Sport: Camogie
- Position: Corner forward
Club
- Years: Club
- 2000 – present: James Stephens
Inter-county
- Years: County
- 2000 – present: Kilkenny
Inter-county titles
- All Stars: 2

Aoife Neary (born 1985) is a camogie player and works as a vascular physiologist in the south east. She lives in County Kilkenny. Winner of All Star awards in 2008 and 2009. Neary played in the All-Ireland Senior Camogie Championship 2009 and again in 2013. Her father, Paddy, was a corner-back with Kilkenny in the early 1980s and went on to serve as an inter-county referee, while her aunt, Catherine Neary, is the Camogie Association president. Aoife Neary won a National League medal in 2008. Neary was on the Junior All-Ireland winning side of 2002 and holds Leinster titles in the Under-14 (two), Under-16 (three), Minor (three), Junior and Senior (three) grades. She has captured Gael Linn Cup Junior and Senior honours with Leinster, Under-16 (two), Junior and Minor titles with her club, and an All-Ireland Senior 'B' Colleges medal.
