= Brenda Hanney =

Personal information
- Native name: Breanda Ní hAnnaigh (Irish)
- Born: 1987 (age 38–39) Galway, Ireland

Sport
- Sport: Camogie
- Position: Full forward
Club*
Years	Club	Apps (scores)
	Killimor	?
Inter-county**
Years	County	Apps (scores)
	Galway	?
- * club appearances and scores correct as of (16:31, 30 June 2011 (UTC)). **Inter County team apps and scores correct as of (16:31, 30 June 2011 (UTC)).

Brenda Hanney (born 1987) is a camogie player, a member of the Galway senior panel that unsuccessfully contested the All Ireland finals of 2010 and 2011 against Wexford, captain of the 2011 All Ireland runners-up and scorer of the winning goal in the 2011 All Ireland semi-final against Kilkenny.

== Other awards ==
All Ireland Club Championship 2011, National Camogie League 2005, All Ireland Intermediate 2004, Junior National Camogie League 2001, All Ireland Junior Championship 2003, Ashbourne Shield with Cork IT 2006.
