= Orla Kilkenny =

Irish camogie player

Personal information
- Native name: Órlaith Nic Giolla Chainnigh (Irish)
- Born: 1983 (age 42–43) Galway, Ireland

Sport
- Sport: Camogie
- Position: Forward
Club*
Years	Club	Apps (scores)
	Pearses Gurteen/Ballmymacward	?
Inter-county**
Years	County	Apps (scores)
	Galway	?
- * club appearances and scores correct as of (16:31, 30 June 2011 (UTC)). **Inter County team apps and scores correct as of (16:31, 30 June 2011 (UTC)).

Orla Kilkenny is a camogie player, a member of the Galway senior panel that unsuccessfully contested the All Ireland finals of 2010 and 2011 against Wexford and winner of an All Star award in 2010.

== Other awards ==
Senior Gael Linn Cup 2008, National Camogie League 2003 and 2005. three senior All Ireland Club Championships, two Ashbourne Cup medals with UL, one All Ireland Minor, two club All-Ireland sevens.
