= Veronica Curtin =

Camogie player (born 1979/80)

Personal information
- Native name: Veronica Nic Chuirtín (Irish)
- Born: Galway, Ireland

Sport
- Sport: Camogie
Club*
Years	Club	Apps (scores)
	Craughwell	?
Inter-county**
Years	County	Apps (scores)
	Galway	?
Inter-county titles
- All Stars: 2
- * club appearances and scores correct as of (16:31, 30 December 2009 (UTC)). **Inter County team apps and scores correct as of (16:31, 30 December 2009 (UTC)).

Veronica Curtin (born 1979 or 1980) is a former inter-county camogie player with Galway. She played in the 2008, 2010 and 2011 All Ireland finals. With a total of 5-15, she was the sixth highest scoring player in the 2011 Senior Camogie Championship. Curtin won camogie All Star awards in 2006 and 2007 and was an All Star nominee in 2010.

== Career ==
Curtin won the Junior All Ireland and Minor All Ireland camogie finals in 1994 - being awarded "Player of the match" in both finals.

She was 16 when she was part of the Galway senior team that won Galway's first ever All-Ireland Senior Camogie Championship title in 1996.

She scored 1-5 out of Galway's total of 1-6 when her county won the 2005 National Camogie League final. She scored two goals in Galway's All Ireland semi-final draw with Cork in the 2010 championship.
