= Therese Maher =

Irish camogie player

Personal information
- Native name: Treasa Ní Meachair (Irish)
- Born: March 1981 (age 45) Galway, Ireland

Sport
- Sport: Camogie
- Position: Centre half back
Club
- Years: Club
- 1996-present: St.Mary's GAA, Athenry
Club titles
- All-Ireland Titles: 1
Inter-county
- Years: County
- 1998-2013: Galway
Inter-county titles
- All-Irelands: 1
- All Stars: 5 and Player of the Year in 2013

Therese Maher is a camogie player, and winner of Five All Star awards 2005, 2008, 2009 and 2011 and 2013.

She finally got an All-Ireland Medal in 2013 after 16 years when her team defeated Kilkenny in the final 1-09 to 0-07 points. She plays for her club, Athenry. She was also a member of the Galway senior panel that unsuccessfully contested the All Ireland finals of 2010 and 2011 against Wexford. She was Galway camogie player of the year 1998 and 2008 and a member of the Team of the Championship for 2011. She was also an All-Star nominee in 2010.

== Other awards ==
Two All Ireland Minor championships 1996 and 1997, Two Gael Linn Cup 2000 and 2008, One National League, Galway Camogie Player of the Year, Two Kilmacud sevens in 2005 and 2007, One Ashbourne Shield, One National Camogie League 2005, Four Senior Club County titles. Therese Maher scored 1-3 in the 2009 Club Semi-Final She captained the Irish team in the 2004 centenary internationals. She featured in a programme dedicated to camogie in the BBC Blue Peter series in 2001.

== Honours ==
=== Club ===
- All-Ireland Senior Club Camogie Championship (1): 2025
- Galway Senior Camogie Championship (5): 2006, 2007, 2008, 2009, 2025

=== County ===
- All-Ireland Senior Camogie Championship (1): 2013
  - Runner-up 1997, 1998, 2008, 2010, 2011
