= Claire Grogan =

Irish camogie player

Personal information
- Native name: Clár Ní Ghrógáin (Irish)
- Born: County Tipperary, Ireland

Sport
- Sport: Camogie
- Position: Centre half forward
Club*
Years	Club	Apps (scores)
	Cashel	?
Inter-county**
Years	County	Apps (scores)
	Tipperary	?
Inter-county titles
- All Stars: 3
- * club appearances and scores correct as of (16:31, 30 June 2010 (UTC)). **Inter County team apps and scores correct as of (16:31, 30 June 2010 (UTC)).

Claire Grogan is a camogie (women's hurling) player, winner of three All-Star awards in 2004, 2005 and 2007 and a Lynchpin award, predecessor of the All Star awards, in 2003. She was short-listed for further All-Star awards in 2004, 2006, 2008 and 2009.

== Career ==
In 2000, she became the youngest player to figure in an All-Ireland senior final since the mid-1950s at the age of 14, something that is no longer possible under camogie rules. She was the outstanding player in that year’s minor championship.

It was the first of seven successive All Ireland finals in which she played for Tipperary, and she set up Emily Hayden for the opening goal after four minutes. She won five All Ireland medals, hitting the point of the match in 2000, scoring a goal in 2001, 2002, 2003 and scoring nine points in 2004. In the 2001 All Ireland club final she scored a late equaliser for Cashel against their Galway opponents only for Pearses to win the title by a point. She won her first All Ireland senior club medal with Cashel in 2007 and captained the team to victory against Athenry in 2009.

She also won a National League medal in 2004.
