= Kate Kelly (camogie) =

Irish camogie player

Personal information
- Native name: Cáit Ní Cheallaigh (Irish)
- Born: Wexford, Ireland

Sport
- Sport: Camogie
- Position: Centre field, corner-forward
Club
- Years: Club
- 2001-: St Ibar’s-Shelmalier
Inter-county
- Years: County
- 2002-: Wexford
Inter-county titles
- All-Irelands: 4
- All Stars: 9

Kate Kelly is a camogie player, winner of nine All-Star awards in 2004, 2006, 2007, 2010, 2011, 2012, 2013, 2015 and 2016. In 2007, she helped Wexford win their first All-Ireland Senior Camogie Championship in 32 years. and further All Ireland medals in 2010, 2011 and 2012 when she was player of the match in the All Ireland final.

== Family background ==
Daughter of Peggy (née Doyle), and niece of Mary, All-Ireland medal winners with Wexford in 1968 and 1969. she is a sister of Mag who was on the 2010-1 panel. Four of her brothers - Denis, Mick, John and Joe played with Wexford in various grades of hurling, while her father, Seán, is a former county under-age hurling mentor. Played in the All-Ireland Intermediate football final of 2007 and completed a notable double as she won the Wexford Supporters' Club player of the year for both camogie and football.

== Other Honours ==
Vodafone camogie player of the year 2007; With Wexford she won National League medals in 2009, 2010 and 2011, and Leinster titles at senior, under-16 and minor level. She was nominated for further All Star awards in 2005, 2008 and 2009. Wexford Supporters' Club camogie and ladies' football player of the year 2007; All-Ireland Under-16 1995; Leinster Under-14 1992, 1993, 1994; Leinster Under-16 1994, 1995, 1996; Leinster Under-18 1997 (captain), 1998; Leinster Senior 1999, 2000, 2001, 2003, 2004; two Ashbournes with WIT 1999, 2001 (captain); Leinster Centenary Ambassador 2004; Senior Gael Linn Cup with Leinster 2006; four Senior Club 1997, 1998, 2001, 2002; two Leinster Senior Club 2001, 2002; Leinster Senior 'B' Colleges with Loreto (Wexford) 1996; Purple and Gold Star 2008. She was a member of the Team of the Championship for 2011. She scored two goals in Wexford's 3-12 to 1-11 victory over Kilkenny in the 2010 All Ireland semi-final.
