= Mary Leacy =

Irish sportsperson (born March 1986)

Personal information
- Native name: Máire Ní Léasaigh (Irish)
- Born: 2 March 1986 (age 40) Oulart, Ireland

Sport
- Sport: Camogie
- Position: Half back
Club
- Years: Club
- 2001-present: Oulart–The Ballagh
Club titles
- All-Ireland Titles: 3
Inter-county
- Years: County
- 2004-2018: Wexford
Inter-county titles
- All-Irelands: 4
- All Stars: 3

Mary Leacy (born 2 March 1986 in Oulart, County Wexford) is an Irish sportsperson. She won camogie All Star awards in 2004, 2007 and 2010. She plays camogie with her local club Oulart–The Ballagh and has been a member of the Wexford senior inter-county team since 2001. Leacy captained Wexford to the All-Ireland title in 2007 and won further All Irelands in 2010 and 2011, and a member of the Team of the Championship for 2011.

== Family background ==
She is a daughter of Margaret O'Leary who won three All-Ireland medals with Wexford in 1968, 1969 and 1975. Margaret (née O'Leary) who was selected at left half-back on the camogie team of the century. Margaret's other honours include seven Gael Linn Cups with Leinster in 1965, 1968, 1969, 1970, 1971, 1972 and 1978; five All-Ireland Clubs, with Eoghan Ruadh (Dublin) in 1967 and with Buffers Alley (Wexford) in 1978, 1981, 1982 and 1983; Gaelic All Star award 1968; captain of the first Wexford team to win the National League in 1977-'78. Mary's sister Una Leacy is also a star camogie player.

== Other honours ==
National League Division one 2009, 2010,2011. All Star 2004; She was an All Star nominee in 2005, 2006, 2007, All-Ireland Under-16 1995 (captain and player of the match); County Centenary Ambassador 2004; Ashbourne Shield 1998; Ashbourne Cup Combined team 1998, 1999, 2000, 2001; Leinster Under-14 1993; Leinster Under-16 1994, 1995; Leinster Under-18 1997; Leinster Senior 1999, 2000, 2001, 2003, 2004, 2007; Club Junior 1996; Club Intermediate 1999; Club Senior 'B' 2003, 2007; Purple and Gold Star 2008. She was player of the match in Wexford's 3-12 to 1-11 victory over Kilkenny in the 2010 All Ireland semi-final.

Sporting positions
Preceded by	Wexford Senior Camogie Captain; 2007	Succeeded by
Achievements
Preceded by Joanne O'Callaghan (Cork)	All-Ireland Senior Camogie Final winning captain 2007	Succeeded by Catríona Foley (Cork)
