= Joanne Ryan (camogie) =

Irish camogie player

Personal information
- Born: County Tipperary, Ireland

Sport
- Sport: Camogie
- Position: Full back
Club*
Years	Club	Apps (scores)
	Drom & Inch	?
Inter-county**
Years	County	Apps (scores)
	Tipperary	?
- * club appearances and scores correct as of (16:31, 30 June 2010 (UTC)). **Inter County team apps and scores correct as of (16:31, 30 June 2010 (UTC)).

Joanne Ryan is a camogie player, winner of an All-Star award in 2006 and All Ireland medals in 2001 (when she scored a point in both finals), 2003 and 2004 when she captained the team and scored the match-winning goal.

== Career ==
She played in six successive All Ireland finals for Tipperary winning five All Ireland medals, captaining the team in 2001, 2002, 2003 and captaining the team in 2004. She also won two Munster senior titles, two Munster minor titles, a County Club title, and the Tipperary Sports Person of the Year in 2004.
