= Killimor =

Village in County Galway, Ireland

Killimor Cill Íomair
- Village
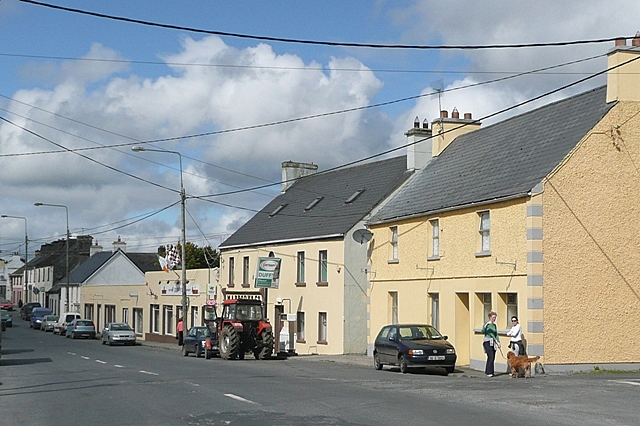
- Looking north-west along Killimor's main street

- Location in Ireland
- Coordinates: 53°09′55″N 8°17′18″W
- Country: Ireland
- Province: Connacht
- County: Galway

Population (2022)
  - Total: 317
- Time zone: UTC+0 (WET)
  - Summer (DST): UTC-1 (IST (WEST))

Killimor (Irish: Cill Íomair, meaning 'Íomar's church') is a village in east County Galway, Ireland. It is on the N65 road around 9 km (6 mi) north-west of Portumna. The village contains a number of facilities including a Heritage Centre, Roman Catholic church, a post office, a national school, a public library (which also provides a variety of activities for children and adults), a post office, a health centre, supermarkets, a pharmacy, restaurants, hairdressers & barbers, a dog grooming salon, a take-away and a number of public houses. It also has a small Adult Education school (Arts, Crafts & Languages).

== See also ==
- List of towns and villages in Ireland
