= 2012 All-Ireland Senior Camogie Championship =

Camogie championship

All-Ireland Senior Camogie Championship 2012
Championship details
- Dates: 23 June — 16 September 2012
- Teams: 8

All-Ireland champions
- Winners: Wexford (7th win)
- Captain: Karen Atkinson
- Manager: J. J. Doyle

All-Ireland runners-up
- Runners-up: Cork
- Captain: Julia White
- Manager: Paudie Murray

The 2012 All-Ireland Senior Camogie Championship—known as the All-Ireland Senior Camogie Championship in association with RTÉ Sport for sponsorship reasons— is the premier competition of the 2012 camogie season. It commenced on 23 June 2012 and ended with the final on 16 September. Eight county teams compete in the Senior Championship out of twenty-seven who compete overall in the Senior, Intermediate and Junior Championships. Wexford defeated Cork in the final. The championship was notable for the qualification of Offaly for the All-Ireland semi-final just three years after they had been graded junior. Quarter-final stages of the championships were re-introduced for the first time since 2006. The 2012 championship was the first to be held under new rules which allowed two points for a point direct from a sideline ball.

== Provincial championships ==
There was an indication of changes in the camogie hierarchy in the provincial championships which were held before the All-Ireland senior championship began. Clare won the Munster championship for the first time since 1944, beating Cork in the final. Offaly defeated Kilkenny in the Leinster semi-final and, although Wexford beat Offaly by 1-12 to 1-7 to win the Leinster final, they were boosted by the experience. Offaly went on to beat Kilkenny for the second time in a championship play-off and then Dublin in the All-Ireland quarter final to qualify for the All-Ireland semi-final for the first time. Clare qualified for the All-Ireland quarter final only to lose to their Munster final victims Cork.

== Structure ==
The eight teams were divided into two groups - Cork, Dublin, Galway and Tipperary in Group 1, and Clare, Kilkenny, Offaly and Wexford in Group 2. Teams received 2 points for a win, 1 point for a draw. The top four teams then contested the semi-finals. All teams in Group 1 played all teams in Group 2. The top team from each group went into the semi-final on opposite sides of the draw. The second team from each group went into quarter-finals on opposite sides of the draw. The third in Group 1 played fourth in Group 2 for a place in the quarter-final and the fourth in Group 1 played the third in Group 2 for a place in the quarter-final. There were draws to decide who played who in the quarter-finals and for home venue for the quarter-finals.

== Manageruial changes ==
For the first time in the history of the championship no female manager had charge if a county team. Wexford retained JJ Doyle as manager. Paudie Murray, brother of goalkeeper Aoife, took over as manager of Cork. Tony Ward took over from Noel Finn as Galway manager. Brendan Williams became Kilkenny manager as Ann Downey departed after four seasons in charge. John Lillis became manager of Tipperary, John Carmody took over from Patsy Fahy as manager of Clare, and John Troy was new manager of Offaly after Joachim Kelly’s achievement in bringing them from junior to senior status in three seasons.

== Dual players ==
Cork players Briege Corkery and Rena Buckley also played for the Cork senior ladies' football team that won the 2012 All-Ireland Senior Ladies' Football Championship. Two Women's Irish Hockey League players played in the championship, Naomi Carroll of Clare and of Emer Lucey of Dublin.

== Opening Rounds ==
The new structure threw up several surprises not least being Offaly’s progression to the semi-final despite finishing joint bottom of the group stages. For the third year in succession Galway defeated the eventual champions in the group stages, but having lost the previous two All- Ireland finals to the same opposition, they failed to reach the final thanks to a late surge by Cork in the semi-final. Offaly achieved a major breakthrough by qualifying for the semi-final.

== Controversy ==
An offer by Wexford GAA to Wexford camogie to staging a double-header between the hurling, and Wexford versus Cork in camogie was rejected by Wexford camogie board

== Semi-final ==
Galway, losing finalists in 2010 and 2011 were defeated in the All-Ireland semifinal by Cork with late double Late goals from Katriona Mackey and Síle Burns.

== Results ==
=== Group stage ===
June 23, 2012	Kilkenny	2-15 – 1-9	Dublin	O'Toole Park
	Miriam Walsh 1-4, Michelle Quilty 1-2, Aoife Neary 0-5f, Katie Power 0-4		Ciara Berkeley 0-6 (4f, 1 '45), Sarah Ryan 1-0, Louise O'Hara 0-2, Amy Murphy 0-1

June 23, 2012	Cork	0-16 – 2-9	Clare	Newmarket on Fergus
	Linda Dorgan 0-2, Gemma O'Connor 0-1, Orla Cotter 0-1, Katriona Mackey 0-1, Jennifer O'Leary 0-9 (6f), Julia White 0-2, Joanne Casey 0-1		Fiona Lafferty 1-2, Claire McMahon 0-5 (3f), Deirdre Murphy 1-0, Shonagh Enright 0-2

June 23, 2012	Galway	1-17 – 1-6	Offaly	Banagher
	Niamh McGrath 0-6 (5f, 1'45), Ann Marie Hayes 0-3, Brenda Hanney 0-3, Tara Ruttledge 1-0, Martina Conroy 0-2, Niamh Kilkenny 0-1, Orla Kilkenny 0-1, Aislinn Connolly 0-1		Elaine Darmody 1-5 (1-4f, 1'45), Orlaith Kirwan 0-1

June 23, 2012	Wexford	1-17 – 1-6	Tipperary	The Ragg
	Úna Leacy 1-4, Ursula Jacob 0-8 (3F 1'45), Katrina Parrock 0-2, Lenny Holohan 0-1, Michelle O'Leary 0-1, Kate Kelly 0-1		Ereena Fryday 1-0, Mary Ryan 0-1, Coaimhe Maher 0-1, Joanne Ryan 0-1, Nicola Walshe 0-2f, Cáit Devane 0-1f

June 30, 2012	Tipperary	2-16 – 0-9	Clare	Semple Stadium
	Cáit Devane 1-3, Joanne Ryan 1-0, Nicole Walsh 0-8 (6f 1'45), Jill Horan 0-3, Siobhan McGrath 0-2		Claire McMahon 0-6 (3f), Chloe Morey 0-1, Naomi Carroll 0-1, Kate Lynch 0-1

June 30, 2012	Galway	2-11 – 1-7	Kilkenny	Nowlan Park
	Brenda Hanney 2-0, Niamh McGrath 0-4f, Martina Conroy 0-2, Aislinn Connolly 0-1, Noreen Coen 0-1, Orla Kilkenny 0.1, Orlaith McGrath 0-1, Tara Ruttledge 0-1		Aoife Neary 0-4f, Katie Power 0-3 (0-1 pen), Edel Maher 1-0

June 30, 2012	Wexford	0-14 – 0-9	Cork	Bellefield, Enniscorthy
	Ursula Jacob 0-8 (6f), Úna Leacy 0-3, Kate Kelly 0-3(2f)		Julia White 0-1, Katriona Mackey 0-1, Orla Cotter 0-2 (1f), Joanne Casey 0-2, Jennifer O'Leary 0-3 (1f)

June 30, 2012	Offaly	3-14 – 3-11	Dubin	O'Toole Park, Crumlin
	Elaine Darmody 3-8(1-05f 1'45), Jean Brady 0-2, Arlene Watkin 0-2, Siobhán Flannery 0-2		Amy Murphy 2-0, Alison Maguire 0-6f, Muireann O'Gorman 1-2, Sarah Ryan 0-1, Ciara Burgess 0-1, Alison Twomey 0-1

July 7, 2012	Galway	1-13 – 0-11	Clare	Cusack Park, Ennis
	Niamh McGrath 0-7 (3f), Martina Conroy 0-2, Aislinn Connolly 0-2, Orla Kilkenny 0-1, Ann Marie Hayes 0-1		Claire McMahon 0-6 (5f), Fiona Lafferty 0-4 (3f), Chloe Morey 0-2, Katie Cahill 0-1

July 7, 2012	Cork	4-20 – 1-5	Offaly	Pairc Ui Chaoimh
	Claire Shine 1-5, Katriona Mackey 1-4, Orla Cotter 0-5 (3f), Katie Buckley 1-2, Linda Dorgan 1-1, Jennifer O'Leary 0-3f		Elaine Darmody 0-3f, Emma Dunne 1-0, Tina Hannon 0-2

July 7, 2012	Tipperary	2-15 – 1-15	Kilkenny	Nowlan Park
	Nicole Walsh 0-7 (0-4 frees, 0-3 '45s), Noreen Flanagan 2-0, Alice Fogarty 0-3, Jill Horan 0-2, Joanne Ryan, Sara Fryday 0-1, Cáit Devane 0-1		Aoife Neary 0-7 (all frees), Katie Power 0-4, Michelle Quilty 1-0, Miriam Walsh 0-2, Noelle Maher 0-1, Niamh Byrne 0-1

July 8, 2012	Wexford	2-20 – 1-4	Dublin	Wexford Park
	Úna Leacy 0-1, Laoise Codd 0-3, Fiona Kavanagh 0-1, Ursula Jacob 1-6 (1-1'45), Karen Kelly 0-2f, Josie Dwyer 0-3, Katrina Parrock 0-3, Evelyn Quigley 1-1		Mairi Moynihan 0-4f, Aisling Carolan 1-0

July 14, 2012	Galway	3-14 – 0-10	Wexford	Kenny Park, Athenry
	Martina Conroy 2-0, Brenda Hanney 1-0, Orla Kilkenny 0-1, Noreen Coen 0-1		Ursula Jacob 0-7, Michelle O'Leary 0-1, Katrina Parrock 0-1, Josie Dwyer 0-1

July 14, 2012	Tipperary	1-12 – 1-10	Offaly	St Brendan's Park, Birr
	Cáit Devane 0-9, Caoimhe Maher 1-1, Siobhan McGrath 0-1, Jill Horan		Elaine Darmody 0-9, Arlene Watkin 1-0, Siobhan Flannery 0-1

July 14, 2012	Cork	2-15 – 1-7	Kilkenny	Ballincollig
	Jennifer O'Leary 0-5 (0-4 '45s), Katie Buckley 1-0, Linda Dorgan 1-0, Katriona Mackey 0-3 . Anna Geary 0-3, Briege Corkery 0-2, Claire Shine 0-1, Joanne Casey 0-1		Michelle Quilty 0-4 (0-3 frees), Miriam Walsh 1-1, Grace Walsh 0-1, Kelly Hamilton 0-1

July 14, 2012	Dublin	1-9 – 0-12	Clare	Parnell Park
	Mairi Moynihan (0-4); Amy Murphy (1-0); Aisling Carolan (0-2), Laura Twomey (0-1) Muireann O'Gorman (0-1), Áine Fanning (0-1)		Clare McMahon (0-7), Naomi Carroll (0-2), Susan Fahy (0-2)

==== Table ====
Team	Pld	W	D	L	F	A	Diff	Pts
Galway	4	4	0	2	77	39	+38	8
Cork	4	3	0	1	78	47	+31	6
Wexford	4	3	0	1	70	48	+22	6
Tipperary	4	3	0	1	67	60	+7	6
Kilkenny	4	1	0	3	59	71	-12	2
Offaly	4	1	0	3	52	88	–36	2
Clare	0	0	1	3	47	66	–19	1
Dublin	4	0	1	4	51	82	–31	1

=== Play-offs ===
July 21, 2012
Play-Off

Cork	1-13 – 0-9	Tipperary
Katriona Mackey 1-4, Jennifer O'Leary 0-5 (4f), Orla Cotter 0-2 (1f), Anna Geary 0-1, Briege Corkery 0-1		Nicole Walsh 0-6 (4f), Ciara Ryan 0-1, Joanne Ryan 0-1, Jill Horan 0-1

Ballincollig

July 21, 2012
Play-Off

Offaly	2-13 – 1-11	Kilkenny
Siobhán Flannery 0-7 (0-3 frees), Elaine Darmody 1-3 (0-2 frees), Michaela Morgan 0-3, Arlene Watkin 1-1		Katie Power 1-2, Aoife Neary 0-5 (all frees), Miriam Walsh 0-3, Noelle Maher 0-1

St Brendan's Park, Birr

July 28, 2012
Play-Off

Clare	1-19 – 1-7	Tipperary
Claire McMahon 0-10 (9f 1'45), Fiona Lafferty 0-4, Naomi Carroll 0-1, Niki Kaiser 0-2, Ailish Considine 1-2		Jill Horan 0-1, Nicole Walsh 1-2, Coaimhe Maher 0-1, Cáit Devane 0-2, Noreen Flanagan 0-1

O'Moore Park

July 28, 2012
Play-Off

Dublin	0-17 – 2-10 aet	Kilkenny
Mairi Moynihan 0-10 (9f 1’45), Aisling Carolan 0-2, Sarah Ryan 0-1, Alison Twomey 0-1, Orla Durkan 0-1, Arlene Cushen 0-1, Áine Fanning 0-1		Aoife Neary 0-7 (4f, 2'45's), Katie Power 1-1, Elaine Aylward 1-0, Kelly Hamilton 0-1, Leanne Fennelly 0-1

O'Moore Park

=== Final stages ===
August 4, 2012
Quarter-Final

Cork	1-10 – 0-10	Clare
Jennifer O'Leary 0-4(2f), Katriona Mackey 1-2, Orla Cotter 0-1f, Katie Buckley 0-1, Joanne Casey 0-1, Aoife Murray 0-1		Chloe Morey 0-6, Fiona Lafferty 0-1, Naomi Carroll 0-1, Claire McMahon 0-1, Susan Fahy 0-1

O'Moore Park

August 4, 2012
Quarter-Final

Offaly	1-13 – 2-9	Dublin
Elaine Darmody 1-7 (1pen 4f 1'45), Michaela Morgan 0-3, Siobhan Flannery 0-2, Arlene Watkin 0-1		Mairi Moynihan 2-2 (1-2f), Louise O'Hara 0-1, Laura Twomey 0-1, Muireann O'Gorman 0-1, Alison Twomey 0-1, Aisling Carolan 0-1, Áine Fanning 0-1, Amy Murphy 0-1

O'Moore Park

August 18, 2012
Semi-Final

Wexford	3-14 – 0-5	Offaly
Katrina Parrock 2-2, Ursula Jacob 1-4, Fiona Rochford 0-3, Kate Kelly 0-3 (1 pen), Úna Leacy 0-1, Fiona Kavanagh 0-1		Elaine Darmody 0-2 (fs), Michaela Morgan 0-1, Siobhan Flannery 0-1, Arlene Watkin 0-1

Nowlan Park

August 18, 2012
Semi-Final

Cork	3-10 – 0-12	Galway
Katriona Mackey 1-2, Síle Burns 1-1, Briege Corkery1-1, Jennifer O'Leary 0-4 (3fs), Gemma O'Connor 0-1		Veronica Curtin 0-3, Niamh McGrath 0-3 (2fs), Niamh Kilkenny 0-2, Aislinn Connolly 0-2, Martina Conroy 0-1, Orla Kilkenny 0-1

Nowlan Park

September 16, 2012
Final

Wexford	3-13 – 3-6	Cork
Ursula Jacob 2-7 (0-4fs, 0-2 45s); Katrina Parrock 1-2; Fiona Rochford 0-2, Kate Kelly 0-2		Jennifer O'Leary 0-4 (3fs, 1 45); Aoife Murray (pen), Sile Burns, Katrina Mackey 1-0 each; Orla Cotter 0-1, Briege Corkery 0-1

Croke Park
Attendance: 14,974
Referee: Mike O'Kelly (Cork)

Wexford	Cork

WEXFORD:
GK	1	Mags D'Arcy (St Martin's)
RCB	2	Claire O'Connor (Rathnure)
FB	3	Catherine O'Loughlin
LCB	4	Karen Atkinson (Oulart-The Ballagh)
RWB	5	Noeleen Lambert (St Martin's)
CB	6	Mary Leacy (Oulart-The Ballagh)
LWB	7	Deirdre Codd
MF	8	Lisa Bolger (St Martin's)) (substituted off) 47'
MF	9	Kate Kelly
RWF	10	Michelle O'Leary (Rathnure)
CF	11	Una Leacy (Oulart-The Ballagh)
LWF	12	Josie Dwyer (Ferns) (substituted off) 57'
RCF	13	Fiona Rochford (St Anne’s)
FF	14	Katrina Parrock (St Ibar’s)
LCF	15	Ursula Jacob (Oulart-The Ballagh)
Substitutes:
MF	Fiona Kavanagh (Oulart-The Ballagh) for Lisa Bolger (substituted in) 47'

CORK:
GK	1	Aoife Murray (Cloughduv) 1-0
RCB	2	Rena Buckley (Inniscarra)
FB	3	Joanne Callaghan (St Finbarr's)
LCB	4	Jenny Duffy (St Finbarr's)
RWB	5	Emer O'Sullivan (Ballinhassig)
CB	6	Gemma O'Connor (St Finbarr's)
LWB	7	Pamela Mackey (Douglas)
MF	8	Jennifer O'Leary (Barryroe)
MF	9	Orla Cotter (St Catherine’s)
RWF	10	Joanne Casey (Inniscarra) (substituted off) 56'
CF	11	Anna Geary (Milford)
LWF	12	Claire Shine (Douglas)
RCF	13	Katriona Mackey (Douglas)
FF	14	Briege Corkery (Cloughduv)
LCF	15	Sile Burns (Rockbán) (substituted off) 56'
Substitutes:
LCF	Katie Buckley {Mallow} for Burns (substituted in) 56'
RWF	Regina Curtin (Milford) for Casey ( (substituted in) 56'

MATCH RULES

- 60 minutes
- Replay if scores level
- Maximum of 5 substitutions

Preceded by All-Ireland Senior Camogie Championship 2011	All-Ireland Senior Camogie Championship; 1932 – present	Succeeded by All-Ireland Senior Camogie Championship 2013
