= 2011 National Camogie League =

Camogie tournament

National Camogie League 2011
Tournament details
- Sponsor: Irish Daily Star
- Date: February 13 – April 27, 2011
- Teams: 22 (8 in Div 1, 10 in Division 2, 5 counties enter 2 teams)

Winners
- Champions: Wexford (4th title)
- Manager: JJ Doyle
- Captain: Ursula Jacob

Runners-up
- Runners-up: Galway
- Manager: Noel Finn
- Captain: Ann Marie Hayes

Other
- Matches played: 15

The 2011 National Camogie League was won by Wexford, their third league title in succession. The final was played on April 17, 2011 as a curtain raiser to the hurling match between Tipperary and Wexford at Semple Stadium, and drew an attendance of 4,180.

== Summary ==
The first National Camogie League Match ever to be televised live opened the season, an unfortunately one-sided encounter under lights in Croke Park in which Kilkenny (7-16) beat Dublin (0-5), televised by Setanta Sports. The eight teams in the first division (Offaly having been promoted since 2010) were drawn into two groups of four. Each team played one another once only. The top two in each group contested the semi-finals. Since 2006 the league is organized into four divisions, with 22 competing county teams graded into four divisions, with the strongest teams in Division 1. The semi-finals were contested at Nowlan Park, Kilkenny on 3 April 201q, in which Galway won revenge for the previous year, beating Kilkenny with a last minute point from Veronica Curtin, and Wexford defeated Tipperary with first-half goals from Una Leacy, Kate Kelly and Katrina Parrock. In the final at Semple Stadium Thurles on Sunday, 17 April 2011, Wexford’s player-of-the-match Una Leacy scored three goals, one from a penalty, against |Galway. Wexford led by 1-5 to 0-6 at half-time. Eleven counties in Division 2 were drawn in two groups of five and six, including the second teams of Cork, Galway, Kilkenny, Tipperary and Wexford, champions for the past two seasons. The divisional competition was marred by the withdrawal of the previous year’s third division champions, Laois. Waterford defeated Antrim by a point in the Division 2 final. Five teams contested Division 3, including the second team of Dublin with Meath topping the table and defeating Kildare by a point in a very competitive final. Four counties contested Division 4. London dropped out and Cavan re-entered the competition, but the divisional fixtures were incomplete as Carlow contesting just one of their three fixtures. Westmeath defeated Cavan in the final.

== Fixtures and results ==
=== Group 1 ===
February 13

Wexford	3–9 – 2-6	Galway

Ballinasloe

February 13

Clare	1-10 – 0-13	Offaly

Meelick

February 27

Galway	0-17 – 0-8	Clare

Ballinakill

February 27

Wexford	2-10 – 0-10	Offaly

Birr

March 12

Wexford	2-16 – 0–4	Clare

Piercestown

March 13

Galway	1-10 – 0-11	Offaly

Duggan Park, Ballinasloe

Team	Pld	W	D	L	F	A	Diff	Pts
Wexford	3	3	0	0	7–39	2-20	+34	6
Galway	3	2	0	1	3-33	3-28	+5	4
Offaly	3	0	1	2	0-34	4–34	-12	1
Clare	3	0	1	2	1-22	2-46	–27	1

=== Group 2 ===
February 27

Kilkenny	7-16 – 0-5	Dublin

Croke Park

February 27

Tipperary	0-14 – 1-10	Cork

The Ragg

Mar 13

Cork	4-20 – 0-4	Dublin

Cork Institute of Technology

Mar 13

Kilkenny	2-11 – 2–8	Tipperary

Kilmanagh

March 20

Tipperary	4-10 – 0-8	Dublin

Rathcoole
March 20

Cork	0-10 – 0-10	Kilkenny

RCIT

Team	Pld	W	D	L	F	A	Diff	Pts
Kilkenny	3	2	1	0	9-37	2-23	+35	5
Tipperary	3	2	0	1	6-32	3-29	+12	4
Cork	3	1	1	1	5-30	0-28	+27	0
Dublin	3	0	0	3	0-17	15-46	–74	0

=== Final stages ===
April 3
Semi-Final

Galway	0-14 – 2-7 ,	Kilkenny

Nowlan Park, Kilkenny

April 3
Semi-Final

Wexford	4-12 – 0-13	Tipperary

Nowlan Park, Kilkenny

2011-4-17
Final
14:00 BST

Wexford	3-10 – 0-10	Galway
Una Leacy 2-1, Ursula Jacob 1-2, Kate Kelly 0-3f, Katrina Parrock 0-2, Mary Leacy 0-1f, Evelyn Quigley 0-1		Aislinn Connolly 0-5, Orla Kilkenny 0-2, Niamh Kilkenny, Brenda Hanney, Veronica Curtin 0-1 each

Semple Stadium, Thurles
Attendance: 2,500
Referee: Mike O'Kelly (Cork)

Wexford	Galway

WEXFORD:
GK	1	Mags D'Arcy (St Martin's)
RCB	2	Claire O'Connor (Rathnure)
FB	3	Catherine O'Loughlin (Monageer-Boolavogue)
LCB	4	Karen Atkinson (Oulart-The Ballagh)
RWB	5	Noeleen Lambert (St Martin's)
CB	6	Mary Leacy (Oulart-The Ballagh) 0-1
LWB	7	Aoife O'Connor (Rathnure) (substituted off) 52'
MF	8	Deirdre Codd (Duffry Rovers)
MF	9	Kate Kelly (St Ibar’s) 0-3
RWF	10	Josie Dwyer (Ferns) (substituted off) 39'
CF	11	Ursula Jacob (Oulart-The Ballagh) 0-2
LWF	12	Michelle O'Leary (Rathnure) 0-1 (substituted off) 39'
RCF	13	Lenny Holohan (Rathnure)
FF	14	Una Leacy (Oulart-The Ballagh) 3-1
LCF	15	Katrina Parrock (St Ibar’s) 0-2
Substitutes:
LWF		Bríd Gordon (Blackwater) for Michelle O'Leary (substituted on) 39'
RWF		Evelyn Quigley (Rathnure) 0-1 for Josie Dwyer (substituted on) 39'
LWB		Fiona Kavanagh (HWH Bunclody) for Aoife O'Connor (substituted on) 52'

GALWAY
GK	1	Susan Earner (Meelick Eyrecourt)
RCB	2	Regina Glynn (Athenry)
FB	3	Sarah Dervan (Mullagh)
LCB	4	Sinéad Cahalan (Mullagh) (substituted off) 52'
RWB	5	Niamh Kilkenny (Pearses) 0-1 (substituted off) 60'
CB	6	Ann Marie Hayes (Killimor)
LWB	7	Sinéad Keane (Kinvara)
MF	8	Emer Haverty (Killimor)
MF	9	Orla Kilkenny (Pearses) 0-2
RWF	10	Aislinn Connolly (Castlegar) 0-5
CF	11	Niamh McGrath (Sarsfields) (substituted off) 47'
LWF	12	Brenda Hanney (Killimor) 0-1
RCF	13	Veronica Curtin (Kinvara) 0-1
FF	14	Noreen Coen (Athenry)
LCF	15	Tara Ruttledge (Portumna) (substituted off) 47'
Substitutes:
LCF		Martina Conroy (Killimordaly) for Tara Ruttledge (substituted on) 47'
CF		Emma Kilkelly (Kinvara) for Niamh McGrath (substituted on) 47'
LCB		Sandra Tannian (St Thomas) for Sinéad Cahalan (substituted on) 52'
RWB		Lorraine Ryan (Killimordaly) for Niamh Kilkenny (substituted on) 60'

MATCH RULES
- 60 minutes
- Replay if scores level
- Maximum of 5 substitutions

== Series statistics ==
=== Scoring ===
- Widest winning margin: 32 points
  - Wexford 7-16 : 0-5 Dublin
- Most goals in a match: 7
  - Wexford 7-16 : 0-5 Dublin
- Widest winning margin (other divisions): 26 points
  - Derry 7-14: 0-9 Down

== Division 2 ==
GROUP 1

- Feb 13 Galway 2-9 Wexford 1-8 Ballinasloe
- Feb 27 Galway 0-16 Down 0-6 Ballinderry
- Feb 27 Antrim 3-6 Tipperary 3-4 Craobh Chiarain
- Mar 13 Galway 1-12 Derry Duggan Pk
- Mar 13 Antrim 1-11 Down 0-4 Clonduff
- Mar 20 Antrim 4-11 Galway 0-12 Sarsfields, Belfast
- Mar 20 Wexford 4-6 Derry 3-7 Craobh Chiarain
- Mar 27 Down 3-10 Wexford 2-12 Blakestown, Co Dublin
- Mar 27 Antrim 3-14 Derry 0-13 St Mary’s, Banagher, Co Derry
- Apr 2 Derry 7-14 Down 0-9 Bellaghy

== Group one table ==
Team	Pld	W	D	L	F	A	Diff	Pts
Antrim	4	4	0	0	11-42	3-33	+33	8
Galway	4	3	0	1	3-50	7-30	+8	6
Derry	4	1	0	3	11-39	8-41	+7	2
Wexford	4	1	0	3	10-30	11-32	-5	2
Down	4	1	0	3	4-29	10-36	-25	2
Laois	0	0	0	0	0	0	0	0

GROUP 2

- Feb 13 Limerick 1-11 Tipperary 2- 8 Ahane
- Feb 27 Cork 0-11 Tipperary 0-6 The Ragg
- Feb 27 Waterford 0-11 Limerick 0-8 Fraher Field, Dungarvan
- Mar 13 Kilkenny 0-10 Tipperary 0-8 Kilmanagh
- Mar 13 Waterford 2-13 Cork 2-11, Cork Institute of Technology
- Mar 20 Kilkenny 1-12 11 Limerick 1-7 Tullogher Archived March 22, 2012, at the Wayback Machine
- Mar 20 Tipperary 0-13 Waterford 1-10 The Ragg
- Mar 27 Cork 3-15 Limerick 3-8 Ahane
- Mar 27 Waterford 1-9 Kilkenny 1-9 Walsh Park
- Apr 2 Cork 1-19 Kilkenny 1-4 Cork Institute of Technology

== Group 2 Table ==
Team	Pld	W	D	L	F	A	Diff	Pts
Cork	4	3	0	1	6-56	6-32	+25	6
Waterford	4	2	2	0	5-40	3-41	+5	6
Kilkenny	4	2	1	1	3-35	3-43	-8	5
Tipperary	4	2	0	2	2-35	2-42	-7	4
Limerick	4	0	1	3	5-34	7-43	-15	1

=== Division 2 Group 2 play-off ===
- Apr 10 Waterford 1-12 Cork 1-9 St Catherine’s, Ballynoe, Co Cork

=== Division 2 Final ===
- Apr 17 Waterford 0-16 Antrim 2-9 Donaghmore, Ashbourne

== Division 3 ==
- Feb 13 Kildare 2-4 Armagh 2-3 Straffan
- Feb 13 Meath 1-7 Dublin 0-5 Trim
- Feb 27 Kildare 0-12 Roscommon 0-3 Athleague
- Feb 27 Meath 3-12 Dublin 0-6 Athletic Grounds
- Mar 13 Kildare 1-13 Dublin 0-4 Craobh Chiarain
- Mar 13 Meath 3-12 Roscommon 0-3 Trim
- Mar 20 Meath 2-11 Armagh 1-11 Armagh Athletic Grounds
- Mar 20 Roscommon 3-12 Dublin 2-10 Craobh Chiarain
- Apr 3 Meath 2-9 Kildare 1-9 Cappagh
- Apr 3 Armagh 0-11 Roscommon 1-4 Knockcroghery

== Division 3 table ==
Team	Pld	W	D	L	F	A	Diff	Pts
Meath	4	4	0	0	8-39	3-29	+25	8
Kildare	4	3	0	1	4-34	4-22	+12	6
Armagh	4	2	0	2	6-37	5-25	+11	4
Roscommon	4	1	0	3	5-26	5-45	-15	2
Dublin	4	0	0	4	2-25	8-44	-37	0

=== Division 3 Final ===
- Apr 24 Meath 3-9 Kildare 2-11 Donaghmore, Ashbourne

== Division 4 ==
- Feb 13 Cavan 4-10 Tyrone 2-6 Breffni Park
- Feb 27 Cavan 4-3 Carlow 2-3 Bagenalstown
- Mar 20 Westmeath 2-6 Cavan Breffni Park
- Apr 3 Westmeath 5-5 Tyrone 3-8 Collinstown

== Division 4 table ==
Team	Pld	W	D	L	F	A	Diff	Pts
Westmeath	2	2	0	0	7-12	4-15	+6	6
Cavan	3	1	0	2	9-20	7-16	+10	4
Tyrone	2	0	0	2	5-14	9-15	-13	2
Carlow	1	0	0	1	3-3	4-3	-3	0

=== Division 4 Final ===
- Apr 24 Westmeath 4-6 Cavan 2-7 Donaghmore, Ashbourne

Preceded by National Camogie League 2010	National Camogie League; 1977 – present	Succeeded by National Camogie League 2012
