= Gael Linn Cup 1968 =

Winners
- Champions: Leinster (8th title)

Runners-up
- Runners-up: Ulster

Other
- Matches played: 3

The 1968 Gael Linn Cup, the most important representative competition for elite level participants in the women's team field sport of camogie, was won by Leinster, who defeated Ulster in the final, played at Croke Park.

== Arrangements ==
Judy Doyle scored five goals as Leinster defeated Connacht by 7–9 to 3–1 at Pearse Park. Munster goalkeeper, Mel Cummins, kept the margin from being more than 8–4 to 4–4 as they lost to Ulster at Fermoy. Ally Hussey was the Leinster star in the final against Ulster, dominating the game from the centre-back position. It was the first Gael Linn final to be played at Corke Park.Agnes Hourigan wrote in the Irish Press:

Although there were eight of the Antrim side on the Ulster team, Ulster played as individuals and thus much of their valuable approach work was wasted.

=== Final stages ===
21 October
Final

Leinster	7–0 – 2–5	Ulster

Croke Park

Leinster	Ulster

Leinster:
GK	1	Teresa Sheil (Wexford)
FB	2	Mary Holohan (Killkenny)
RWB	3	Joan Murphy (Wexford)
CB	4	Ally Hussey (Dublin)
LWB	5	Carmel O'Shea (Killkenny)
MF	6	Mary Sherlock (Dublin) (1–0)
MF	7	Margaret O'Leary (Wexford)
MF	8	Bríd Kinsella (Killkenny)
RWF	9	Kit Kehoe (Dublin) (1–0)
CF	10	Mary Walsh (Wexford) (captain) (2–0)
LWF	11	Judy Doyle (Dublin) (3–0)
FF	12	Mary Doyle (Wexford)

Ulster:
GK	1	Teresa Cassidy (Antrim)
FB	2	Moya Forde (Antrim) (captain)
RWB	3	Moira Caldwell (Down)
CB	4	Eileen Coulter (Down)
LWB	5	Kathleen Kelly (Antrim)
MF	6	Mairéad McAtamney (Antrim) (0–1)
MF	7	Sue Cashman (Antrim) (0–2)
MF	8	Barbara Sands (Down)
RWF	9	Pat Crangle (Down) (1–0)
CF	10	Mairéad Quinn (Antrim) (0–2)
LWF	11	Eileen Collins (Antrim)
FF	12	Lily Scullion (Antrim) (1–0)

Preceded by Gael Linn Cup 1967	Gael Linn Cup; 1954 – present	Succeeded by Gael Linn Cup 1969
