= Gael Linn Cup 2004 =

Tournament details
- Sponsor: Schwarzkopf

Winners
- Champions: Munster (18th title)

Runners-up
- Runners-up: Connacht

Other
- Matches played: 3

The 2004 Gael Linn Cup, the most important representative competition for elite level participants in the women's team field sport of camogie, was won by Munster, who defeated Connacht in the final, played at Silver Park Kilmacud.

== Arrangements ==
Connacht defeated Leinster in an exceptional quality semi-final by 3–11 to 3–10. Munster defeated Ulster 1–20 to 1–9. A goal from Tipperary's Deirdre Hughes helped Munster defeat Connacht by seven points in the final. Hughes scored the goal after she was fed by her county colleague Eimear McDonnell, helping Munster lead by 1–8 to 0–5 at half time. Cork' Mary O'Connor was selected as the player of the tournament helped by her tally of 0–3 in the final, while Deirdre Hughes, Eimear McDonnell and Ellen O'Brien were Munster's heroines as they defeated Connacht by 1–16 to 1–9.

=== Final stages ===
Final

| Munster | 1–16 – 1–9 | Connacht |

Silver Park Kilmacud

| Munster | Connacht |

|}

Munster:
| GK | 1 | Aoife Murray (Cork) |
| RCB | 2 | Joanne Callaghan (Cork) |
| FB | 3 | Una O'Dwyer (Tipperary) |
| LCB | 4 | Mairéad Kelly (Limerick) |
| RWB | 5 | Sinéad Nealon (Tipperary) |
| CB | 6 | Mary O'Connor (Cork) |
| LWB | 7 | Therese Brophy (Tipperary) |
| MF | 8 | Angie McDermott (Tipperary) |
| MF | 9 | Siobhán Ryan (captain) (Tipperary) |
| RWF | 10 | Jenny O'Leary (Cork) |
| CF | 11 | Emily Hayden (Tipperary) |
| LWF | 12 | Vera Sheehan (Limerick) |
| RCF | 13 | Eimear McDonnell (Tipperary) |
| FF | 14 | Deirdre Hughes (Tipperary) |
| LCF | 15 | Ellen O'Brien (Limerick) |

Connacht:
| GK | 1 | Sharon Finneran (Rocommon) |
| RCB | 2 | Martina Harkin (Galway) |
| FB | 3 | Sinéad Cahalan (Galway) |
| LCB | 4 | Lizzie Flynn (Galway) |
| RWB | 5 | Colette Glennon (Galway) |
| CB | 6 | Ailbhe Kelly (Galway) |
| LWB | 7 | Sinéad Keane (Galway) |
| MF | 8 | Caroline Kelly (Galway) |
| MF | 9 | Anne Hardiman (Galway) |
| RWF | 10 | Caroline Murray (Galway) |
| CF | 11 | Áine Hillary (Galway) |
| LWF | 12 | Ann Marie Hayes (Galway) |
| RCF | 13 | Orla Kilkenny (Galway) |
| FF | 14 | Lourda Kavanagh (Galway) |
| LCF | 15 | Emma Kilkelly (Galway) |

== Junior Final ==
Final

| Munster | 4–16 – 1–4 | Leinster |

Silver Park Kilmacud

| Munster | Leinster |

|}

Munster:
| GK | 1 | Ellen Clifford (Cork) |
| RCB | 2 | Joan Scanlon (Clare) |
| FB | 3 | Helen Breen (Tipperary) |
| LCB | 4 | Caitríona Foley (Cork) |
| RWB | 5 | Méadhbh Corcoran (Tipperary) |
| CB | 6 | Amanda O'Regan (Cork) |
| LWB | 7 | Kate Marie Hearn (Waterford) |
| MF | 8 | Elaine O'Riordan (Cork) |
| MF | 9 | Julia Kirwan (Tipperary) |
| RWF | 10 | Áine Lyng (Waterford) |
| CF | 11 | Anna Geary (Cork) |
| LWF | 12 | Deirdre Murphy (Clare) |
| RCF | 13 | Catherine O'Loughlin (Clare) |
| FF | 14 | Miriam Deasy (Cork) |
| LCF | 15 | Mary Coleman (Cork) |

Leinster:
| GK | 1 | Emer Butler (captain) (Dublin) |
| RCB | 2 | Sylvia Hanks (Dublin) |
| FB | 3 | Aishling Moran (Wexford) |
| LCB | 4 | Jenny Codd(Wexford) |
| RWB | 5 | Eileen Hanrick (Wexford) |
| CB | 6 | Louise Conlon(Kildare) |
| LWB | 7 | Anna Campion (Laois) |
| MF | 8 | Therese Keenan (Laois) |
| MF | 9 | Orla Bambury (Kildare) |
| RWF | 10 | Gretta Heffernan (Wexford) |
| CF | 11 | Brenie Kennedy(Kildare) |
| LWF | 12 | Una Leacy (Wexford) |
| RCF | 13 | Jeanette Feighery (Offaly) |
| FF | 14 | Susie O'Carroll (Kildare) |
| LCF | 15 | Evelyn Quigley (Wexford). |

|}

| Preceded by Gael Linn Cup 2003 | Gael Linn Cup; 1954 – present | Succeeded by Gael Linn Cup 2005 |
