= Gael Linn Cup 2005 =

Winners
- Champions: Munster (19th title)

Runners-up
- Runners-up: Connacht

Other
- Matches played: 3

The 2005 Gael Linn Cup, the most important representative competition for elite level participants in the women's team field sport of camogie, was won by Munster, who defeated Connacht in the final, played at Ballinteer.

== Arrangements ==
In the tournament at St John's Ballinteer, Munster defeated Leinster 1–12 to 0–2. Connacht defeated Leinster by a point, 2–6 to 1–8. Munster defeated Connacht 3–14 to 2–8 in the final. Senior player of the Tournament was Cork's Anna Geary.

=== Gael Linn trophy ===
In the tournament at St John's Ballinteer, Munster defeated Leinster by two points 2–8 to 2–6. Ulster defeated Connacht 3–10 to 0–7. Munster defeated Ulster 1–14 to 2–4 in the final.

=== Final stages ===
Final

Munster	3–14 – 2–8	Connacht

Ballinteer

Munster	Connacht

|}

Munster:
GK	1	Aoife Murray (Cork)
RCB	2	Joanne O'Callaghan (Cork)
FB	3	Caitríona Foley (Cork)
LCB	4	Rena Buckley (Cork)
RWB	5	Mary O'Connor (Cork)
CB	6	Suzanne Kelly (Tipperary)(captain)
LWB	7	Anna Geary (Cork)
MF	8	Gemma O'Connor (Cork)
MF	9	Joanne Ryan (Tipperary)
RWF	10	Rachel Maloney (Cork)
CF	11	Jenny O'Leary (Cork)
LWF	12	Una O'Donoghue (Cork)
RCF	13	Stephanie Delea (Cork)
FF	14	Elaine Burke (Cork)
LCF	15	Mary Coleman (Cork)

Connacht:
GK	1	Stephanie Gannon (Galway)
RCB	2	Regina Glynn (Galway)
FB	3	Áine Hillary (Galway)
LCB	4	Nicola Gavin (Galway)
RWB	5	Colette Glennon (Galway)
CB	6	Sinéad Cahalan (Galway)
LWB	7	Ailbhe Kelly (Galway)
MF	8	Brenda Hanney (Galway)
MF	9	Katherine Glynn (Galway)
RWF	10	Deidre Burke (Galway)
CF	11	Therese Maher (Galway)
LWF	12	Lourda Kavanagh (Galway)
RCF	13	Susan Keane (Galway)
FF	14	Veronica Curtin (Galway)
LCF	15	Orla Kilkenny (Galway)

== Junior Final ==
Final

Munster	2–14 – 2–8	Ulster

Ballinteer

Munster	Ulster

Munster:
GK	1	Aisling O'Brien (Waterford)
RCB	2	Sinead Scanlan (Clare)
FB	3	Niamh Harkins (Tipperary)
LCB	4	Lucy Hawkes (Cork)
RWB	5	Michelle Shortt (Tipperary)
CB	6	Cathy Halley (Clare)
LWB	7	Orla Coughlan (Cork)
MF	8	Áine Lyng (Waterford)
MF	9	Áine Watson (Cork)
RWF	10	Laura Linnane (Clare)
CF	11	Eimear O'Friel (Cork) (captain)
LWF	12	Catherine O'Loughlin (Clare)
RCF	13	Deirdre Twomey (Cork)
FF	14	Veronica Curtin (Galway)
LCF	15	Orla Kilkenny (Galway)

Ulster:
GK	1	Claire O'Kane (Derry)
RCB	2	Sinéad Stephenson (Derry)
FB	3	Mairéad Graham (Antrim)
LCB	4	Ciara Cushnahan (Derry)
RWB	5	Caitríona O'Kane (Derry)
CB	6	Claire Doherty (Derry) (captain)
LWB	7	Jane Carey (Derry)
MF	8	Gráinne McGoldrick (Derry)
MF	9	Briege Convery (Derry)
RWF	10	Kerrie O'Neill (Antrim)
CF	11	Katie McAuley (Derry)
LWF	12	Elaine Dowds (Antrim)
RCF	13	Cathy Mulholland (Down)
FF	14	Cathy McGourty (Down)
LCF	15	Sinéad Cassidy (Derry)

Preceded by Gael Linn Cup 2004	Gael Linn Cup; 1954 – present	Succeeded by Gael Linn Cup 2006
