= 1969 All-Ireland Senior Camogie Championship =

Camogie championship

All-Ireland Senior Camogie Championship 1969
Winners
- Champions: Wexford (2nd title)
- Captain: Brigit Doyle

Runners-up
- Runners-up: Antrim
- Captain: Maeve Gilroy

Other
- Matches played: 2

The 1969 All-Ireland Senior Camogie Championship was the high point of the 1969 season in Camogie. The championship was won by Wexford who defeated Antrim by a two-point margin in the final.

== The championship ==
After decades of dominance by Dublin, the camogie championship had been thrown open by events of the previous 18 months. Five counties Wexford, Antrim, Kilkenny, Cork and Dublin were serious contenders for the 1969 title with Tipperary and Galway not far behind. Cork lost to Tipperary in the Munster semi-final and then Tipp beat limerick in the Munster final.

A player from each side was sent off for the first time in an inter-county match in 1969, Mary Graham (Tipperary) and Josie Kehoe (Wexford) were sent off by referee Nancy Murray for rough play in the All Ireland semi-final. Margaret O’Leary struck a late free to the Tipperary net to give Wexford a 4–4 to 3–3 victory. Galway trailed Antrim by seven points at the break in the second semi-final at Glenariffe, then came back with a storming finish only to fail by a single point to catch Antrim.

== Final ==
It took a great goal by Cathy Power, 90 seconds from time, to save the day for Wexford in the All-Ireland final against Antrim at Croke Park on 21 September. The lead changed hands twice in the closing minutes as Antrim made a remarkable comeback and they were within touching distance of snatching an unexpected victory. The political situation in Northern Ireland had prevented Antrim from preparing for the final as they would have liked. Agnes Hourigan, president of the Camogie Association, wrote in the Irish Press:

Wexford are still All-Ireland camogie champions, but only, one might say, by a single puck of the ball, for it took a great goal 90 seconds from time by corner forward Catherine Power to save the day and the title for the Leinster girls after an unfancied Antrim had seemed certain to snatch unexpected victory from an amazing second half rally. The high excitement of the closing stages, the lead changed hands twice in the last couple of minutes, coupled with some magnificent camogie all through rp0ivded wonderful entertainment for the fair-sized crowd. If Antrim failed to climax their great comeback with what would have been a remarkable victory, they certainly proved that they are still ads good as the best, and they have in Mairead McAtamney one of the greatest players of all time.

=== Final stages ===
Semi-Final

| Wexford | 4-4 – 3-3 | Tipperary |

Wexford Park

Semi-Final

| Antrim | 2-6 – 3-2 | Galway |

Glenariffe

21 September
Final

| Wexford | 4-4 – 4-2 | Antrim |

Croke Park

| Wexford | Antrim |

WEXFORD:
| GK | 1 | Theresa Shiel (St Ibar's/Shelmalier) |
| FB | 2 | Joanne Murphy (St John's, Wexford) |
| RWB | 3 | Ann (Nan) Foley (Cloughbawn/Adamstown) |
| CB | 4 | Brigit Doyle (Cloughbawn/Adamstown) (Capt) |
| LWB | 5 | Bridget O'Connor (St Patrick's, Campile) |
| MF | 6 | Mary Walsh (St Ibar's/Shelmalier) |
| MF | 7 | Margaret O'Leary (Buffers Alley) 0-2 |
| MF | 8 | Brenie Murphy (Cloughbawn/Adamstown) (substituted off) 45' |
| RWF | 9 | Cathy Power (St Patrick's, Campile) (1-0) |
| CF | 10 | Anne Kehoe (Cloughbawn/Adamstown) |
| LWF | 11 | Mary Doyle (St Ibar's/Shelmalier) (1-1) |
| FF | 12 | Mary Shannon (St Patrick's, Campile) (2-0) |
Substitutes:
| LCF | | Peg Moore (Kilrush St Brigid's) for Brenie Murphy (substituted in) 45' |

ANTRIM:
| GK | 1 | Kathleen Kelly |
| FB | 2 | Moya Ford |
| RWB | 3 | Ethna Dougan |
| CB | 4 | Maeve Gilroy |
| LWB | 5 | Kathleen McManus |
| MF | 6 | Eileen Collins |
| MF | 7 | Mairéad McAtamney (1-1) |
| MF | 8 | Nuala Havelin (1-0) |
| RWF | 9 | Mairéad Quinn (0-1) |
| CF | 10 | Marion McFetridge (1-0) |
| LWF | 11 | Lilly Scullion (1-0) |
| FF | 12 | Christine Wheeler. |

MATCH RULES

- 50 minutes
- Replay if scores level
- Maximum of 3 substitutions

== See also ==
- All-Ireland Senior Hurling Championship
- Wikipedia List of Camogie players
- National Camogie League
- Camogie All Stars Awards
- Ashbourne Cup

| Preceded by All-Ireland Senior Camogie Championship 1968 | All-Ireland Senior Camogie Championship; 1932 – present | Succeeded by All-Ireland Senior Camogie Championship 1970 |
