= Gael Linn Cup 2001 =

Tournament details
- Sponsor: Schwarzkopf

Winners
- Champions: Munster (15th title)

Runners-up
- Runners-up: Connacht

Other
- Matches played: 3

The 2001 Gael Linn Cup, the most important representative competition for elite level participants in the women's team field sport of camogie, was won by Munster, who defeated Connacht in the final, played at Bohernabreena.

== Arrangements ==
Munster defeated Ulster 5–16 to 3–7. Connacht defeated Leinster by a point 0–13 to 1–9. Munster, with eight Tipperary players, defeated holders Connacht 1–18 to 1–9 in the final.

=== Gael Linn Trophy ===
Munster defeated Ulster 2–8 to 0–5. Leinster defeated Connacht 3–9 to 1–10. Aoife Neary scored the decisive goal as Leinster defeated Munster 1–14 to 1–11 in the final.

=== Final stages ===
Final

Munster	1–18 – 1–8	Connacht

Bohernabreena

Munster	Connacht

Munster:
GK	1	Jovita Delaney (Tipperary)
RCB	2	Paula Bulfin (Tipperary)
FB	3	Una O'Dwyer (Tipperary)
LCB	4	Claire Madden (Tipperary)
RWB	5	Paula O'Connor (Cork)
CB	6	Therese Brophy (Tipperary)
LWB	7	Sarah Hayes (Cork)
MF	8	Linda Mellerick (Cork) (captain)
MF	9	Vera Sheehan (Limerick)
RWF	10	Ellen O'Brien (Limerick)
CF	11	Philly Fogarty (Tipperary)
LWF	12	Fiona O'Driscoll (Cork)
RCF	13	Clare Grogan (Tipperary)
FF	14	Eimear McDonnell (Tipperary)
LCF	15	Rachel Maloney (Cork)

Connacht:
GK	1	Louise Curry (Galway)
RCB	2	Róisín O'Connor (Galway)
FB	3	Áine Hillary (Galway)
LCB	4	Ann Broderick (Galway)
RWB	5	Pamela Nevin (Galway)
CB	6	Olivia Broderick (Galway)
LWB	7	Cathy Bowes (Galway)
MF	8	Therese Maher (Galway)
MF	9	Caroline Murray (Galway)
RWF	10	Stephanie Griffin (Galway)
CF	11	Lourda Kavanagh (Galway)
LWF	12	Elaine Kerins (Galway)
RCF	13	Orla Kilkenny (Galway)
FF	14	Sandra Tannian (Galway)
LCF	15	Aoife Lynskey (Galway)

== Junior Final ==
Final

Leinster	1–14 – 1–11	Munster

Bohernabreena

Leinster	Munster

Leinster:
GK	1	Fiona McLeish (Offaly)
RCB	2	Catherine O'Loughlin (Wexford)
FB	3	Carina Carroll (Offaly)
LCB	4	Majella Bergin (Offaly)
RWB	5	Dervilla O'Carroll (Meath)
CB	6	Orla Bambury (Kildare)
LWB	7	Edel Maher (Killkenny)
MF	8	Gretta Heffernan (Wexford)
MF	9	Michelle Davis (Offaly)
RWF	10	Janette Feighery (Offaly)
CF	11	Aoife Neary (Killkenny)
LWF	12	Mary Henry (Westmeath) (captain)
RCF	13	Christina Raleigh (Meath)
FF	14	Sharron Daly (Offaly)
LCF	15	Catherine Glynn (Westmeath)

Munster:
GK	1	Helen Breen (Tipperary)
RCB	2	Niamh Connolly (Tipperary)
FB	3	Méadhbh Corcoran (Tipperary)
LCB	4	Lorraine Burke (Tipperary)
RWB	5	Nora Ahern (Cork)
CB	6	Deirdre McDonnell (Tipperary)
LWB	7	Valerie O'Keeffe (Cork)
MF	8	Marie O'Connell (Cork)
MF	9	Sharon Ralph (Tipperary)
RWF	10	Jean O'Sullivan (Cork)
CF	11	Siobhán Ryan (Tipperary)
LWF	12	Louise Young (Tipperary)
RCF	13	Colette Desmond (Cork)
FF	14	Ger Collins (Cork)
LCF	15	Catherine Glynn (Westmeath)

Preceded by Gael Linn Cup 2000	Gael Linn Cup; 1954 – present	Succeeded by Gael Linn Cup 2002
