= 2010 National Camogie League =

Camogie tournament

Tournament details
- Date: 7 February – 24 April
- Teams: 22 (7 in Div 1, 6 counties enter 2 teams)

Winners
- Champions: Wexford (3rd title)
- Manager: JJ Doyle
- Captain: Una Leacy

Runners-up
- Runners-up: Kilkenny
- Manager: Ann Downey
- Captain: Ann Dalton

Other
- Matches played: 15

The 2010 National Camogie League is a competition in the women's team field sport of camogie was won by Wexford for the second year in succession. They defeated Kilkenny in the final, played at Semple Stadium.

== Arrangements ==
The seven teams in the first division were drawn into two groups of four and three. Each team played one another once only. The top two in each group contested the semi-finals. Since 2006 the league is organized into four divisions, with 22 competing county teams graded into four divisions, with the strongest teams in Division 1. The semi-finals were contested at O'Connor Park, Tullamore, on 10 April 2010, in which Kilkenny came from behind to defeat Galway.

== Final ==
In the final, played at Semple Stadium in Thurles on Saturday, 24 April 2010, Wexford defeated Kilkenny by 1–7 to 1–6. The winning point came from Ursula Jacob in the eighth minute of injury time, after a late goal from substitute Linda Bolger.

== Lower divisions ==
Eleven counties in Division 2 were drawn in two groups of five and six, including the second teams of Cork, Galway, Kilkenny, Tipperary and Wexford. Wexford intermediates, managed by Karen Barnes and captained by Ciara O'Connor of Rathnure, unexpectedly defeated Offaly in the final by 2–9 to 1–9, the second year in succession that Wexford has simultaneously held the first and second division titles. Six teams contested Division 3, including the second team of Dublin with Laois defeating Meath in the final, and three counties contested Division 4, including London, with Westmeath defeating Tyrone in the final.

== Fixtures and results ==
=== Group A ===
February 28

Galway	3–16 – 1–5	Clare

Athenry

February 28

Wexford	2–17 – 0–5	Dublin

Monamolin

March 7

Dublin	2–6 – 1–8	Clare

Parnell Park, Dublin

March 7

Wexford	1–17 – 2–6	Galway

Enniscorthy

March 14

Wexford	2–15 – 0–7	Clare

Clarecastle

–---

March 14

Galway	3–12 – 0–11	Dublin

Parnell Park, Dublin

Team	Pld	W	D	L	F	A	Diff	Pts
Wexford	3	3	0	0	6–49	2–18	+34	6
Galway	3	2	0	1	8–34	2–33	+19	4
Dublin	3	1	0	2	2–22	6–37	–29	2
Clare	3	0	0	3	2–20	8–37	–35	0

=== Group B ===
February 28

Kilkenny	5–5 – 0–11	Tipperary

The Ragg

March 7

Kilkenny	3–4 – 1–6	Cork

Mullinavat

Mar 15

Cork	0–12 – 1–7	Tipperary

Cork Institute of Technology

August 1

Galway	1–16 – 0–8	Limerick

Athenry

August 1

Clare	0–3 – 2–15	Wexford

Bodyke

Team	Pld	W	D	L	F	A	Diff	Pts
Kilkenny	2	2	0	0	8–9	1–17	+13	4
Cork	2	1	0	1	1–18	4–11	−2	4
Tipperary	2	0	0	2	1–18	5–17	–11	0

=== Final stages ===
April 10
Semi-Final

Wexford	4–5 – 0–9	Cork

Nowlan Park, Kilkenny

April 10
Semi-Final

Kilkenny	2–12 – 1–12	Galway

Nowlan Park, Kilkenny

2010-4-24
Final
14:00 BST

Wexford	1–7 – 1–6	Kilkenny
Kate Kelly 1–3 (0–3f), Caroline Murphy, Una Leacy 0–1 each, Ursula Jacob (0–2).		Marie Dargan 1–1, Aoife Neary 0–3 (0–1f, 0–1 45), Denise Gaule 0–1, Michelle Quilty (0–1)

Semple Stadium, Thurles
Attendance: 2,500
Referee: Alan Lagrue (Kildare)

Wexford	Kilkenny

WEXFORD:
GK	1	Mags D'Arcy (St Martin's)
RCB	2	Claire O'Connor (Rathnure)
FB	3	Catherine O'Loughlin (Monageer-Boolavogue)
LCB	4	Karen Atkinson (Oulart-The Ballagh)
RWB	5	Noeleen Lambert (St Martin's)
CB	6	Mary Leacy (Oulart-The Ballagh)
LWB	7	Deirdre Codd (Duffry Rovers)
MF	8	Josie Dwyer (Ferns)
MF	9	Caroline Murphy (Ferns) (0–1)
RWF	10	Katrina Parrock (St Ibar's-Shelmalier) (substituted off) 45'
CF	11	Michelle O'Leary (Rathnure)
LWF	12	Kate Kelly (St Ibar’s) (1–3)
RCF	13	Fiona Kavanagh (Half Way House Bunclody)
FF	14	Una Leacy (Oulart-The Ballagh) (0–1)
LCF	15	Lenny Holohan (Rathnure)
Substitutes:
RWF		Ursula Jacob (Oulart–The Ballagh) (0–2) for Parrock (substituted on) 45'

KILKENNY:
GK	1	Caitríona Ryan (Tullogher)
RCB	2	Amy Butler (Mullinavat)
FB	3	Catherine Doherty (St Anne's)
LCB	4	Jacqui Frisby (Ballyhale Shamrocks)
RWB	5	Kate McDonald (Thomastown)
CB	6	Leann Fennelly (Mullinavat)
LWB	7	Elaine Aylward (Mullinavat)
MF	8	Keeva Fennelly (Ballyhale Shamrocks) (substituted off) 21'
MF	9	Denise Gaule (Windgap) (substituted off) 47' (0–1)
RWF	10	Ann Dalton (St Lachtain's)
CF	11	Katie Power (Piltown)
LWF	12	Marie Dargan (St Martin's) (1–1)
RCF	13	Michelle Quilty (Mullinavat) (0–1), (substituted off) 58'
FF	14	Deirdre Delaney (St Lachtain's) (substituted off) 30'
LCF	15	Aoife Neary (James Stephens) (0–3)
Substitutes:
MF		Anna Farrell (Thomastown) for Keeva Fennelly (substituted on) 21'
FF		Shelly Farrell (Thomastown) for Deirdre Delaney (substituted on) 30'
MF		Edwina Keane (St Martin's) for Gaule (substituted on) 47'
RCF		Collette Dormer (Paulstown) (0–1) for Quilty (substituted on) 58'

MATCH RULES

- 60 minutes
- Replay if scores level
- Maximum of 5 substitutions

== Series statistics ==
=== Scoring ===
- Widest winning margin: 18 points
  - Wexford 2–17 : 0–5 Dublin
- Most goals in a match: 5
  - Kilkenny 5–5 : 0–6 Tipperary
- Widest winning margin (other divisions): 26 points
  - Roscommon 6–13 : 0–5 Dublin

=== Top Scorers Division 1 ===
- Aislinn Connolly (Galway) 1–20 23
- Kate Kelly (Wexford) 2–17 23
- Una Leacy (Wexford) 4–11 23
- Aoife Neary (Kilkenny) 3–12 21
- Veronica Curtin (Galway) 4–3 15
- Ann Dalton (Kilkenny) 2–6 12
- Claire Grogan (Tipperary) 0–12 12
- Lenny Holohan (Wexford) 2–5 11
- Fiona Kavanagh (Wexford) 2–5 11
- Ciara Lucey (Dublin) 0–11 11

== Division 2 ==
GROUP 1

- Feb 14 Wexford 5–8 Waterford 2–7 Fenor
- Feb 14 Limerick 0–13 Down 2– 6 Ashbourne
- Feb 27 Wexford 2–10 Down 1–13 Clonshaugh
- Feb 28 Galway 2–10 Waterford 2–7 Athenry
- Mar 6 Wexford 3–9 Galway 1–3 Enniscorthy
- Mar 6 Limerick 1–10 Waterford 1–10 Kilmallock
- Mar 21 Down 2–11 Galway 0–9 Clonduff
- Mar 21 Wexford 3–11 Limerick 2–8 Cushinstown
- Apr 4 Limerick 5–13 Galway 2–6 Limerick Gaelic Grounds
- Apr 4 Waterford 3–9 Down 1–9 Blanchardstown

GROUP 2

- Feb 14 Tipperary 2–10 Antrim 0–4 Swords
- Feb 14 Offaly 2–13 Kilkenny 0–3 Lisdowney
- Feb 14 Derry wo Cork Swords
- Feb 28 Tipperary 2–12 Kilkenny 0–5 The Ragg
- Feb 28 Offaly 0–15 Derry 1–6 Cooley
- Feb 28 Cork 2–7 Antrim 2–7 Trim
- Mar 6 Kilkenny 3–6 Cork 3–6 Mullinavat
- Mar 6 Antrim 0–13 Derry 2–7 Creggan
- Mar 6 Offaly 0–14 Tipperary 0–13 Banagher
- Mar 14 Cork 2–12 Tipperary 1–8 CIT
- Mar 14 Offaly 4–11 Antrim 5–7 St Gall's
- Mar 14 Derry 3–15 Kilkenny 0–4 Blanchardstown
- Apr 4 Offaly 3–14 Cork 0–10 Banagher
- Apr 4 Derry 3–20 Tipperary 2–6 Blanchardstown
- Antrim wo Kilkenny

== Group one table ==
Team	Pld	W	D	L	F	A	Diff	Pts
Wexford	4	3	1	0	13–38	6–31	+28	7
Limerick	4	2	1	1	8–44	8–33	+11	5'
Down	4	1	1	2	6–39	5–31	+11	3
Waterford	4	1	1	2	8–33	9–37	−7	3
Galway	4	1	0	3	5–28	12–40	−33	2

== Group 2 Table ==
Team	Pld	W	D	L	F	A	Diff	Pts
Offaly	5	5	0	0	9–67	6–39	+37	10
Derry	5	3	1	1	9–48	2–38	+31	7'
Antrim	5	1	2	2	7–31	10–35	−13	5
Cork	5	1	2	2	7–35	9–35	−6	4
Tipperary	5	2	0	3	6–49	5–45	−8	4
Kilkenny	5	0	1	4	3–18	10–46	−49	1

=== Division 2 Final ===
- Apr 24 Wexford 2–9 Offaly 1–9 Thurles

== Top scorers ==
- Elaine Darmody (Offaly) 2–34 40
- Áine Lyng (Waterford) 4–19 31
- Ellen O'Brien (Limerick) 3–14 23
- Sarah Louise Carr (Down) 4–10 22
- Ciara O'Connor (Wexford) 2–16 22
- Siobhán Flannery (Offaly) 3–11 20
- Fiona Kavanagh (Wexford) 5–5 20
- Gráinne McGoldrick (Derry) 0–20 20
- Shannon Graham (Antrim) 3–10 19
- Chartolle Kearney (Cork) 4–5 17

== Division 3 ==
- Feb 7 Kildare 1–7 Dublin 0–4 Ballyboden
- Feb 7 Laois 5–14 Meath 3–3 Ashbourne
- Feb 14 Meath 1–9 Armagh 0–5 Ashbourne
- Feb 14 Roscommon 2–5 Kildare 0–7 Celbridge
- Feb 14 Laois 3–16 Dublin 0–1 Portlaoise
- Feb 28 Meath 1–15 Roscommon 2–10 Ballyforan
- Feb 28 Laois 4–11 Kildare 2–4 Rathdowney
- Feb 28 Armagh 4–13 Dublin 0–3 Cullyhanna
- Mar 6 Kildare 2–8 Meath 1–11 St Laurence's
- Mar 6 Laois 5–17 Armagh 2–7 Rathdowney
- Mar 7 Roscommon 6–13 Dublin 0–5 Athleague
- Mar 14 Kildare 4–8 Armagh 2–12 Mullaghbawn
- Mar 14 Meath 4–7 Dublin 1–4 Donaghmede
- Mar 14 Laois 0–13 Roscommon 0–10 Athleague
- Mar 21 Armagh 3–7 Roscommon 1–7 Tullysaran

== Division 3 table ==
Team	Pld	W	D	L	F	A	Diff	Pts
Laois	5	5	0	0	17–71	7–27	+74	10
Meath	5	3	1	1	10–45	10–39	+6	7'
Kildare	5	2	1	2	9–34	9–43	−9	'5
Armagh	5	2	0	3	11–44	8–34	+19	4
Roscommon	5	2	0	3	11–45	4–47	+19	'4
Dublin	5	0	0	5	1–17	18–57	−91	0

=== Division 3 Final ===
- Apr 10 Laois 2–10 Meath 2–5 Tullamore'

== Top scorers ==
- Colette McSorley (Armagh) 10–28 58
- Jane Dolan (Meath) 4–31 43
- Kelly Hopkins (Roscommon) 5–20 35
- Susie O'Carroll (Kildare) 2–23 29
- Áine Mahony (Laois) 3–19 28
- Louise Mahoney (Laois) 0–27 27
- Annette McGeeney (Roscommon) 4–9 21

== Division 4 ==
- Feb 28 Westmeath 3–3 London 1–7 Watford
- Feb 28 Tyrone 4–12 Carlow 0–7 Dungannon.
- Mar 6 London 2–4 Tyrone 1–6 Watford;
- Mar 14 Tyrone 2–7 Westmeath 3–3 Oliver Plunkett's Mullingar
- Mar 21 Tyrone 1–12 London 1–3 Derrytresk;

=== Division 4 Final ===
- Apr 11 Tyrone 3–12 Westmeath 1–9 Omagh

Preceded by National Camogie League 2009	National Camogie League; 1977 – present	Succeeded by National Camogie League 2011
