= Gael Linn Cup 2002 =

Tournament details
- Sponsor: Schwarzkopf

Winners
- Champions: Munster (16th title)

Runners-up
- Runners-up: Ulster

Other
- Matches played: 3

The 2002 Gael Linn Cup, the most important representative competition for elite level participants in the women's team field sport of camogie, was won by Munster, who defeated Ulster in the final, played at Bohernabreena.

== Arrangements ==
Ulster defeated Connacht 3–14 to 2–16. Captained by Tipperary centre-half back Ciara Gaynor, Munster defeated Leinster 5–13 to 1–10. Munster defeated Ulster by 7–23 to 0–11 in the final.

=== Final stages ===
Final

Munster	7–23 – 0–11	Ulster

Bohernabreena

Munster	Ulster

|}

Munster:
GK	1	Ger Casey (Cork)
RCB	2	Joanne Callaghan (Cork)
FB	3	Una O'Dwyer (Tipperary)
LCB	4	Claire Madden (Tipperary)
RWB	5	Sinéad Nealon (Tipperary)
CB	6	Ciara Gaynor (Tipperary) (Capt)
LWB	7	Therese Brophy (Tipperary)
MF	8	Jovita Delaney (Tipperary)
MF	9	Philly Fogarty (Tipperary)
RWF	10	Colette Desmond (Cork)
CF	11	Vera Sheehan (Limerick)
LWF	12	Noelle Kennedy (Tipperary)
RCF	13	Eimear McDonnell (Tipperary)
FF	14	Deirdre Hughes (Tipperary)
LCF	15	Ellen O'Brien (Limerick)

Ulster:
GK	1	Christine Doherty (Antrim)
RCB	2	Sinéad Stevenson (Derry)
FB	3	Maureen Duffin (Antrim)
LCB	4	Gráinne Maguire (Derry)
RWB	5	Edel Mason (Antrim)
CB	6	Ciara Gault (Antrim)
LWB	7	Jennifer Braniff (Down)
MF	8	Gráinne Connolly (Antrim)
MF	9	Grace McMullan (Antrim)
RWF	10	Gráinne McGoldrick (Derry)
CF	11	Paula McCloy (Derry)
LWF	12	Jane Adams (Antrim)
RCF	13	Carla Doherty (Antrim)
FF	14	Maureen McAleenan (Down)
LCF	15	Paula McAtamney (Derry)

== Junior Final ==
Final

Ulster	4–11 – 1–13	Leinster

Bohernabreena

Ulster	Leinster

|}

Ulster:
GK	1	Claire O'Kane (Derry)
RCB	2	Deborah Kelland (Down)
FB	3	Colette Burns (Armagh)
LCB	4	Helen Kelly (Derry)
RWB	5	Nuala O'Hagan (Derry)
CB	6	Catherine Pickering (Derry)
LWB	7	Fionnuala Carr (Down)
MF	8	Katrina Curry (Armagh)
MF	9	Katie McAuley (Derry)
RWF	10	Mary Black (Armagh)
CF	11	Patricia McEvoy (Armagh)
LWF	12	Paula Bell (Derry)
RCF	13	Claire Gormley (Derry)
FF	14	Eilish Doherty (Derry)
LCF	15	Briege Convery (Derry)

Leinster:
GK	1	Fiona McLeish (Offaly)
RCB	2	Michelle Jordan (Wexford)
FB	3	Catherine O'Loughlin (Wexford)
LCB	4	Carina Carroll (Offaly)
RWB	5	Mary Burke (Meath)
CB	6	Louise Conlon (captain) (Kildare)
LWB	7	Michelle Davis (Offaly)
MF	8	Aoife Neary (Killkenny)
MF	9	Jeanette Feighery (Offaly)
RWF	10	Lenora Lyons (Laois)
CF	11	Marguerite Smithers (Laois)
LWF	12	Gretta Heffernan (Wexford)
RCF	13	Edel Maher (Killkenny)
FF	14	Una Leacy (Wexford)
LCF	15	Maggie Lynch (Offaly)

Preceded by Gael Linn Cup 2001	Gael Linn Cup; 1954 – present	Succeeded by Gael Linn Cup 2003
