= Bríd Gordon =

Irish camogie player

Personal information
- Native name: Bríd Ní Mhuirneacháin (Irish)
- Born: 31 May 1987 (age 39) Wexford, Ireland

Sport
- Sport: Camogie
- Position: Left wing forward
Club
Years	Club	Apps (scores)
	Blackwater	?
Inter-county
- Years: County
- Wexford
Inter-county titles
- All-Irelands: 2

Bríd Gordon is a camogie player, winner of an All-Ireland Senior medal in 2010,2011 and 2012. She was born in Cornamona.

== Other awards ==
National Camogie League medals in 2010 and 2011; Division two 2009.
