= Margaret O'Leary =

Irish camogie player and trainer

Personal information
- Native name: Mairéad Ní Laoire (Irish)
- Born: Monamolin County Wexford, Ireland

Sport
- Sport: Camogie
- Position: centre-back
Club
- Years: Club
- 1966-1977: Buffers Alley
Inter-county
- Years: County
- 1966-1977: Wexford
Inter-county titles
- All-Irelands: 3
- All Stars: 2004 Team of Century

Margaret O'Leary-Leacy is an Irish former camogie player selected on the camogie team of the century in 2004, and winner of All Ireland medals in 1968, 1969 and 1975. O'Leary-Leacy was inducted into the Gaelic Writers' Association Hall of Fame in 2022, for her dedication to the promotion of camogie.

== Playing career ==
She played for Buffers Alley Club with whom she won three All Ireland Club Championships. She also holds eight Gael Linn interprovincial medals. She was selected as the Gaelic Weekly All Star Camogie Player of the Year in 1968 and was twice voted Wexford Powers "Sport Star of the Year" 1966 and 1968.

== Administrator ==
O'Leary-Leacy later became chair of the Oulart the Ballagh club where she trained five Féile na Gael teams to All Ireland success.

== Team of the Century ==
O'Leary-Leacy's team of the century citation read "a player of remarkable all round ability, she was equally at home at midfield or in the backs. A powerful striker, she was capable of turning defence into attack with one puck of the sliotar. Highly motivated, determined and full of energy she inspired her team-mates".

O'Leary-Leacy was inducted into the Gaelic Writers' Association Hall of Fame in 2022, "for more than 50 years of dedication to the promotion of camogie".

== Family ==
Her daughters Mary and Una later played for Wexford.
