= Mary Gannon =

American actress (1829–1868)

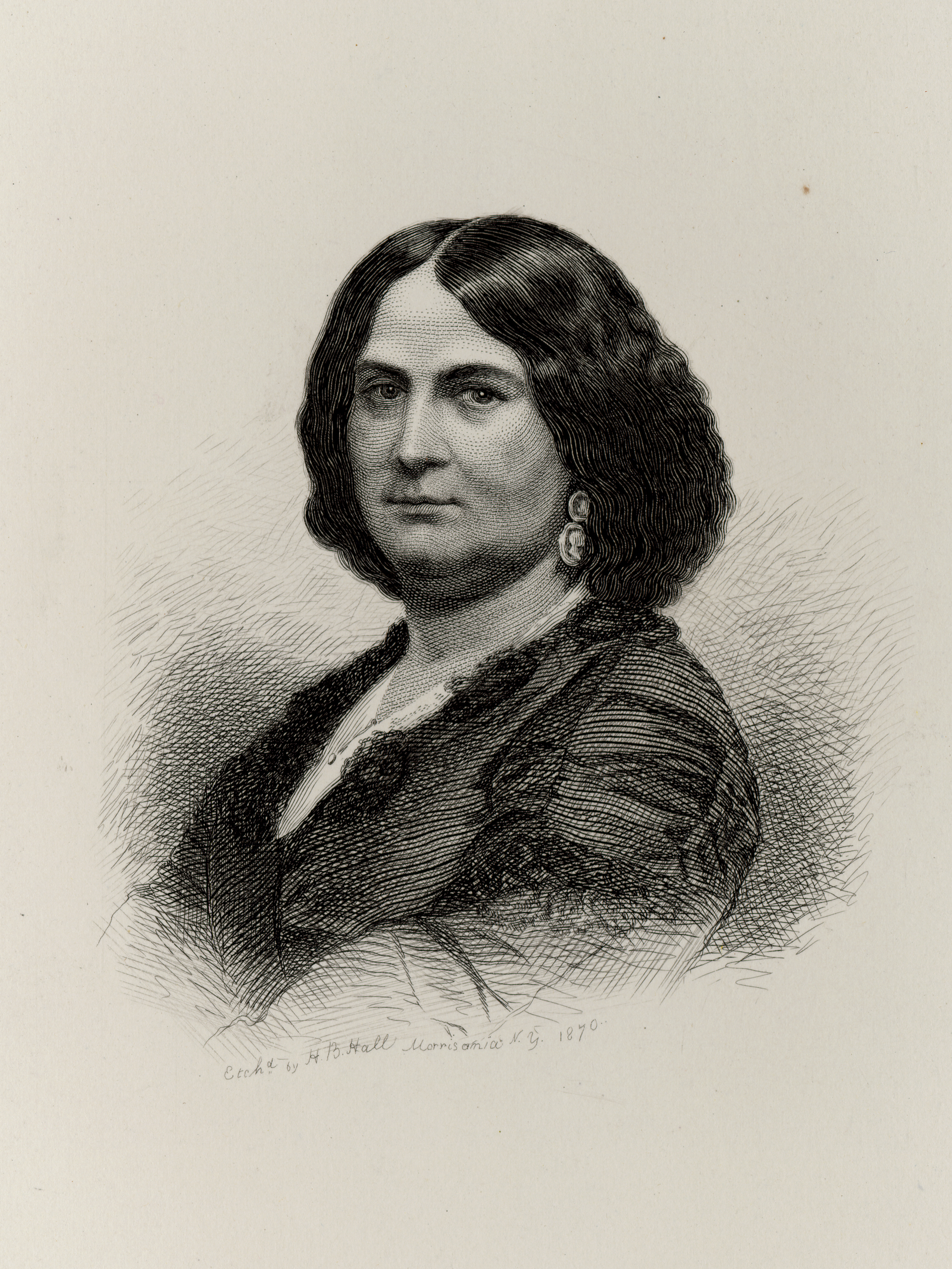
Bust portrait, engraved by H. B. Hall (1870)

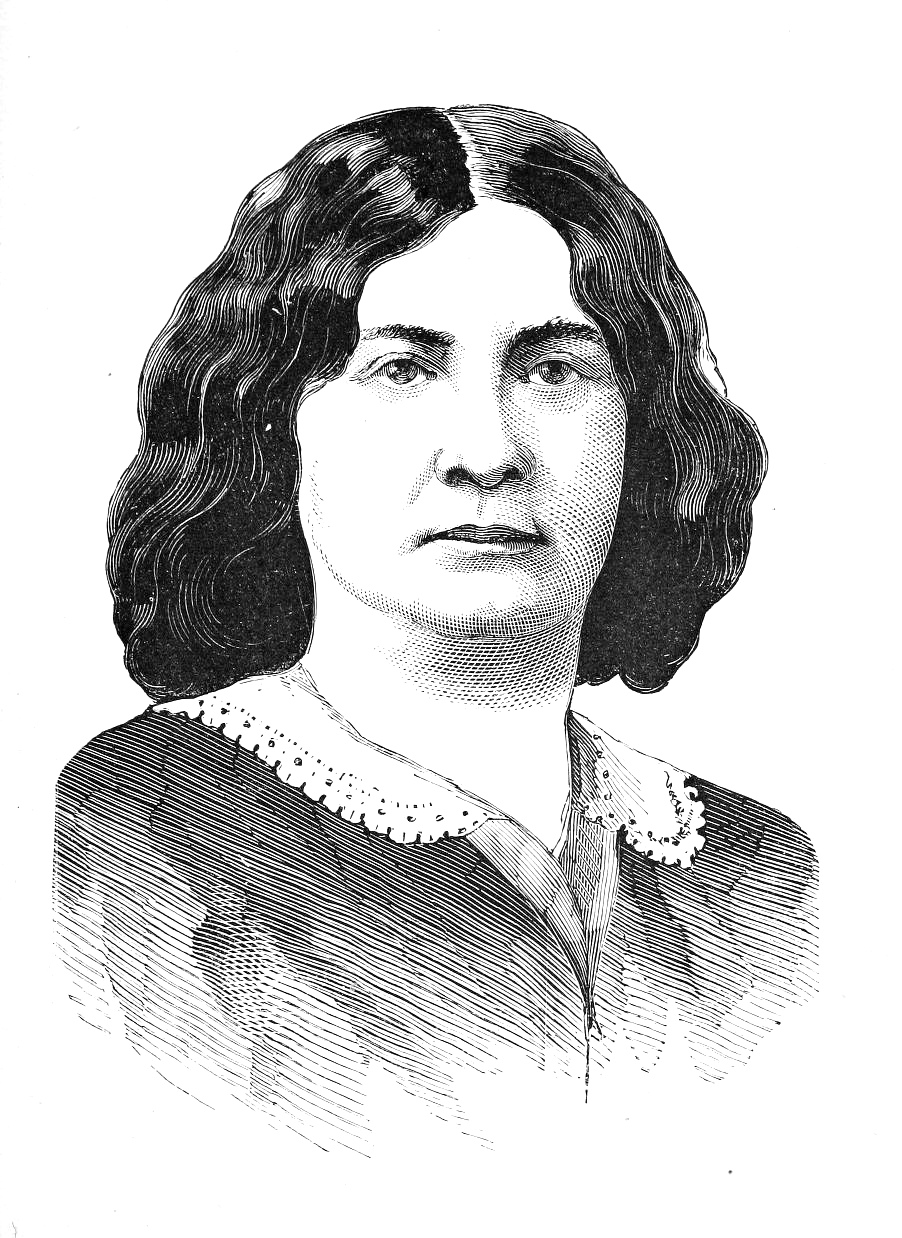
Another portrait, engraved by an unknown artist (1870)

Mary Stevenson (née Gannon; October 8, 1829 – February 22, 1868), known professionally as Mary Gannon, (Note: Her obituary in the New York Times calls her "Mrs George Stevenson, better known under her maiden name of Mary Gannon".) was an American actress who had an active stage career in comedies and vaudeville during the mid 19th century. A gifted comedienne, she became associated with many of the matron roles of 18th and 19th century comedies. Shortly before her death at the age of 39, New York theatre critic Joseph N. Ireland wrote of Gannon, "[she] is now universally acknowledged to be the best general comic actress in the city."

== Child actress ==
Born in New York City on October 8, 1829, Gannon was the daughter of Irish immigrants and began her career as a child actress sometime between 1832 and 1835. Some sources claim she made her stage debut in a production of Donizetti's The Daughter of the Regiment in 1835 at the Richmond Hill Theatre in New York; whereas other sources claim she had performed earlier at the Old Bowery Theatre. She made her debut in Philadelphia on January 18, 1838, at the Walnut Street Theatre, as Lady Flennap, in Garrick's farce of Lilliput. Gannon was then known as the "Lilliputian Wonder". The following year she made her bow at the Park Theatre. In 1841 she played an engagement at the American (afterwards Barnum's) Museum, appearing in six characters and executing a dance from La Bayadere in the vaudeville of The Actress of All Work. She was then carded as "La petite Elssler." She reappeared in Philadelphia on March 10, 1846, at Masonic Hall, as Fairy of the Lake, in Kate Kearney. In addition to these performances, she appeared as a dancer and actress in regional theaters during her early career.

== Adult career ==
As an adult, Gannon became a popular actress in the cities of New York and Philadelphia; particularly in comedies and in vaudeville. When the season of 1848 commenced at the Olympic Theatre under William Mitchell, Gannon was in the company. Here she remained for some time quite a favorite with her audiences. She had a series of critical triumphs at the Wallack's Theatre where she performed as a leading comedic actress beginning in 1855 up until her death thirteen years later. Some of the plays in which she starred at that theatre included James Sheridan Knowles's The Love Chase, Octave Feuillet's The Romance of a Poor Young Man, Knights of the Round Table, Elizabeth Inchbald's To Marry, or Not to Marry, and Augustus Glossop Harris's The Little Treasure, among others. On September 21, 1857, she again appeared in Philadelphia at the Walnut Street Theatre, as Katryn in Captain of the Watch.

== Decline and death ==
When the comedy of Ours was re-produced at Wallack's, in January, 1868, Gannon appeared as Mary Nettley. She could scarcely support herself through the effort, and the curtain fell on that evening on her last appearance. She died in New York, after a long, painful illness, on February 22, 1868. Her funeral took place on February 25. The pallbearers were George Holland, John Gilbert, A. V. Young, Mark Smith, John Perley, J. H. Wilbour, Mr. Maeder and Mr. Larrason. She was interred in Greenwood.

== Personal life ==
While engaged at the Olympic she was married to George Stevenson, a lawyer, who died in 1854.

== Sources ==
- Bordman, Gerald; Hischak, Thomas S. (2004). "Gannon, Mary (1829–68), comedienne". The Oxford Companion to the American Theatre. 3rd ed. Oxford University Press. Retrieved 20 August 2022.
- James Fisher (2015). "Gannon, Mary (1829—1868)". Historical Dictionary of American Theater. Rowman & Littlefield. p. 188. ISBN 9780810878334.
- Vickery-Bareford, Melissa (2000). "Gannon, Mary (1829-1868), actress". American National Biography. Oxford University Press. Retrieved 20 August 2022.
- "Obituary; Miss Mary Gannon, of Wallack's Theatre". The New York Times. February 23, 1868. p. 4.
- "Funeral of Mary Gannon". The New York Times. February 25, 1868. p. 4.
- "Obsequies of Mary Gannon". The New York Times. February 26, 1868. p. 5.
