= Munster GAA =

Provincial council of the Gaelic Athletic Association

- Irish: An Mhumhain
- Number of counties: 6
- Province colours: Blue Navy
- Major grounds: Semple Stadium; Gaelic Grounds; Fitzgerald Stadium; Páirc Uí Chaoimh; Cusack Park; Walsh Park

Most All-Ireland titles
- Hurling: Cork (30)
- Football: Kerry (39)

Most provincial titles
- Hurling: Cork (55)
- Football: Kerry (87)

Interprovincial Championship wins
- Hurling: 46
- Football: 15

Standard kit
- Regular kit

The Munster Council is a provincial council of the Gaelic Athletic Association sports of hurling, Gaelic football, camogie, rounders and handball in Munster, one of the four provinces of Ireland.

== County boards ==
- Cork
- Clare
- Kerry
- Limerick
- Tipperary
- Waterford

== Hurling ==
=== Provincial team ===
The Munster provincial hurling team represents the province of Munster in hurling. The team competes in the Railway Cup.

==== Honours ====
- Railway Cups: 46
  - 1928, 1929, 1930, 1931, 1934, 1937, 1938, 1939, 1940, 1942, 1943, 1944, 1945, 1946, 1948, 1949, 1950, 1951, 1952, 1953, 1955, 1957, 1958, 1959, 1960, 1961, 1963, 1966, 1968, 1969, 1970, 1976, 1978, 1981, 1984, 1985, 1992, 1995, 1996, 1997, 2000, 2001, 2005, 2007, 2013, 2016

==== Current panel ====
No.	Player	Position	Club
1	Anthony Nash	Goalkeeper	Cork
2	Shane O'Neill	Right corner back	Cork
3	Seamus Hickey	Full back	Limerick
4	Pádraic Maher	Left corner back	Tipperary
5	Brendan Bugler	Right half back	Clare
6	Michael Walsh	Centre back	Waterford
7	Brendan Maher	Left half back	Tipperary
8	Paul Browne	Midfield	Limerick
9	Conor Ryan	Midfield	Clare
10	Tony Kelly	Right half forward	Clare
11	John O'Dwyer	Centre forward	Tipperary
12	Pa Cronin	Left half forward	Cork
13	Shane Dowling	Right corner forward	Limerick
14	Séamus Callanan	Full forward	Tipperary
15	Patrick Horgan	Left corner forward	Cork

No.	Player	Position	Club
16	Patrick Kelly	Substitute	Clare
17	Shane Nolan	Substitute	Kerry
18	Kevin Moran	Substitute	Waterford
19	Lar Corbett	Substitute	Tipperary
20	Mark Ellis	Substitute	Cork
21	Patrick Maher	Substitute	Tipperary
22	Noel McGrath	Substitute	Tipperary
23	Conor McGrath	Substitute	Clare
24	Conor Lehane	Substitute	Cork

==== Players ====
Players from the following county teams represent Munster: Clare, Cork, Kerry, Limerick, Tipperary and Waterford.

===== Notable players =====
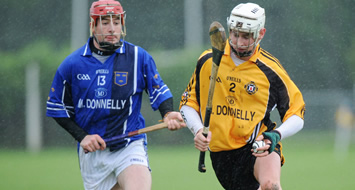
Limerick's Andrew O'Shaughnessy (left) representing Munster in the 2008 Railway Cup hurling semi-final against Ulster

- Tom Cheasty
- Ray Cummins
- John Doyle
- Jimmy Doyle
- Nicky English
- Pat Hartigan
- John Keane
- Ger Loughnane
- Jack Lynch
- Mick Mackey
- Justin McCarthy
- Tony Reddin
- Christy Ring
- Jimmy Smyth

=== Competitions ===
==== Inter-county ====
Competition	Year	Champions	Title	Runners-up	Next edition
Munster Senior Hurling Championship	2026	Limerick	26th	Cork	2027
Munster Senior Hurling League	2026	Limerick	4th	Waterford	2027
Munster Under-20 Hurling Championship	2026	Clare	5th	Tipperary	2027
Munster Minor Hurling Championship	2026	Tipperary	43rd	Limerick	2027
Inactive competitions
Munster Intermediate Hurling Championship	2016	Clare	2nd	Limerick	TBD
Munster Junior Hurling Championship	1996	Cork	21st	Tipperary	TBD
Waterford Crystal Cup	2015	Limerick	2nd	Cork	TBD

Record

- All-Ireland Senior Hurling Championships: 80
  - Cork: 1890, 1892, 1893, 1894, 1902, 1903, 1919, 1926, 1928, 1929, 1931, 1941, 1942, 1943, 1944, 1946, 1952, 1953, 1954, 1966, 1970, 1976, 1977, 1978, 1984, 1986, 1990, 1999, 2004, 2005
  - Tipperary: 1887, 1895, 1896, 1898, 1899, 1900, 1906, 1908, 1916, 1925, 1930, 1937, 1945, 1949, 1950, 1951, 1958, 1961, 1962, 1964, 1965, 1971, 1989, 1991, 2001, 2010, 2016, 2019, 2025
  - Limerick: 1897, 1918, 1921, 1934, 1936, 1940, 1973, 2018, 2020, 2021, 2022, 2023, 2026
  - Clare: 1914, 1995, 1997, 2013, 2024
  - Waterford: 1948, 1959
  - Kerry: 1891

==== Club ====
Competition	Year	Champions	Title	Runners-up	Next edition
Munster Senior Club Hurling Championship	2022	Ballygunner	4th	Ballyea	2023
Munster Intermediate Club Hurling Championship	2022	Monaleen	1st	Roscrea	2023
Munster Junior Club Hurling Championship	2022	Ballygiblin	2nd	St. Kieran’s	2023

== Football ==
=== Provincial team ===
The Munster provincial football team represents the province of Munster in Gaelic football. The team competes in the Railway Cup.

==== Players ====
Players from the following county teams represent Munster: Clare, Cork, Kerry, Limerick, Tipperary and Waterford.

==== Honours ====
- Railway Cup: 15
  - 1927, 1931, 1941, 1946, 1948, 1949, 1972, 1975, 1976, 1977, 1978, 1981, 1982, 1999, 2008

=== Inter-county ===
==== Competitions ====
Competition	Year	Champions	Title	Runners-up	Next edition
Munster Senior Football Championship	2026	Kerry	87th	Cork	2027
Munster Under-20 Football Championship	2026	Kerry	32nd	Cork	2027
Munster Minor Football Championship	2026	Cork	32nd	Kerry	2027
McGrath Cup	2026	Cork	12th	Kerry	2027
Inactive competitions
Munster Junior Football Championship	2019	Kerry	46th	Cork	TBD

Record

- All-Ireland Senior Football Championships: 51
  - Kerry: 1903, 1904, 1909, 1913, 1914, 1924, 1926, 1929, 1930, 1931, 1932, 1937, 1939, 1940, 1941, 1946, 1953, 1955, 1959, 1962, 1969, 1970, 1975, 1978, 1979, 1980, 1981, 1984, 1985, 1986, 1997, 2000, 2004, 2006, 2007, 2009, 2022, 2025
  - Cork: 1890, 1911, 1945, 1973, 1989, 1990, 2010
  - Tipperary: 1889, 1895, 1900, 1920
  - Limerick: 1887, 1896

==== Club ====
Competition	Year	Champions	Title	Runners-up	Next edition
Munster Senior Club Football Championship	2022	Kerins O'Rahilly's	1st	Newcastle West	2023
Munster Intermediate Club Football Championship	2022	Rathmore	1st	Na Piarsaigh	2023
Munster Junior Club Football Championship	2022	Fossa	1st	Kilmurry	2023

== Camogie ==
=== Gael Linn Cup ===
The Munster camogie team won the premier representative competition in the women’s team field sport of camogie, the Gael Linn Cup on 20 occasions, in 1961, 1963, 1964, 1966, 1980, 1982, 1990, 1992, 1994, 1995, 1996, 1997, 1998, 1999, 2001, 2002, 2003, 2004, 2005 and 2009.

=== Gael Linn Trophy ===
The Munster provincial junior camogie team won the Gael Linn Trophy on 17 occasions in 1975, 1977, 1978, 1980, 1983, 1985, 1987, 1988, 1992, 1994, 1996, 1997, 2003, 2004, 2005, 2008 and 2011.

== Inter-county honours ==
Rank	Team	Football		Hurling		Total		Most recent Provincial	
Rank	Team	Title(s)	Runners-up	Title(s)	Runners-up	Title(s)	Runners-up	Title	Runner-up
1	Cork	37	55	55	30	92	85	2025 (H)	2026 (F)
2	Kerry	87	24	1	4	88	28	2026 (F)	2008 (F)
3	Tipperary	10	18	42	28	52	46	2020 (F)	2021 (H)
4	Limerick	1	13	26	28	27	41	2026 (H)	2025 (H)
5	Waterford	1	9	9	21	10	30	2010 (H)	2020 (H)
6	Clare	2	13	6	23	8	36	1998 (H)	2025 (F)
