= 1968 All-Ireland Senior Camogie Championship =

Camogie championship

All-Ireland Senior Camogie Championship 1968
Winners
- Champions: Wexford (1st title)
- Manager: Theresa Murphy
- Captain: Mary Walsh

Runners-up
- Runners-up: Cork
- Captain: Ann Crotty

The 1968 All-Ireland Senior Camogie Championship was the high point of the 1968 season in Camogie. The championship was won by Wexford who defeated Cork by a three-point margin in the final.

== Dublin's defeat ==
Dublin's 2–3 to 1–3 defeat by Kilkenny at Parnell Park on 23 June 1968 was their first defeat in a Leinster championship match since July 1936, when they lost to Louth. Agnes Hourigan wrote in the Irish Press

Kilkenny earned the unexpected victory and the right to meet Wexford in the Leinster final because they were the more alert side all through, faster to the ball and always showed the greater dash. Dublin played with the wind in the opening half, and though they had more of the play, it was Kilkenny who made the better use of fewer chances to lead by 2–0 to 0–1 at the interval, with goals from Brenda Kinsella and Teasie O'Neill to Maureen Brennan’s Dublin point. The winners increased their lead soon after the restart, when Ann Carroll pointed from a 30, but Dublin now rallied. Judy Doyle took a neat pass from Anne McAllister to score a good goal. Kilkenny again attacked and after failing on two 30s had a vital point by Brenda Kinsella. Dublin switched Kit Murphy to right wing and Maureen Brennan to midfield and staged a late rally that brought points from Kit Murphy and Kitty Kehoe to reduce the margin to two points. Kilkenny had the last word, however, when Ann Carroll landed a long range point to clinch victory. It was Dublin’s first defeat in this competition since they lost to Louth in July 1936.

Kilkenny played two matches to reach the Leinster final while Wexford got there without playing a match, getting a bye in the first round and then got a walkover from Louth. As Agnes Hourigan, president of the Camogie Association, pointed out in the Irish Press

Beginning with a coaching course around Easter, the drive went on for the revival of defunct clubs, and was continued by naming a panel of county players early on and giving them as much match-play experience as possible against varied opposition. That long-term preparation certainly paid off on Sunday when the whole Kilkenny side, from start to stop, played with the most important asset of all. They went out in the firm belief that they could beat Dublin and they did just that.

== Leinster final ==
It took Kilkenny six years to win an All Ireland title, instead it was Wexford who delivered a breakthrough victory in 1968. They killed off the Linester final with three goals in the first ten minutes and went on to defeat Kilkenny 8–3 to 1–3 with four goals from Mary Doyle, and one each from Jose Kehoe, Bridget O'Connor, Mary Walsh and Ellen Allen.

== Final ==
Two goals down after seven minutes, Wexford battled back in the second quarter to win the final. One of their heroines was playing in her first senior game, Jose Kehoe from Cloughbawn, a last minute change at corner forward for Eileen Allen, and scored an opportunist first goal after the Cork goalkeeper had saved a free from Brenda Doyle that was going over for a point. Agnes Hourigan, president of the Camogie Association, wrote in the Irish Press

Always fast and never without excitement this was a most satisfying game that kept the crowd of between five and six thousand in a constant uproar as Cork against the odds, swept into an early lead. But Wexford came storming back to first level and then draw ahead, so that the Leinster champions seemed well on the road to victory when they led 3–1 to 2–0 at half time, with the advantage of the fresh breeze still to come.

=== Final stages ===
Semi-Final

Cork	2-11 – 1-2	Ballinasloe

Semi-Final

Galway	4-6 – 4-4	Antrim

Glenariffe

15 September
Final

Wexford	4-2 – 2-5	Cork

Croke Park

Wexford	Cork

WEXFORD:
GK	1	Theresa Shiel (St Ibar's/Shelmalier)
FB	2	Mary Sinnott (St Patrick's, Campile)
RWB	3	Phyllis Kehoe (St Ibar's/Shelmalier)
CB	4	Joanne Murphy (St John's, Wexford)
LWB	5	Carmel Fortune (St John's, Wexford)
MF	6	Bridget O'Connor (Cloughbawn/Adamstown)
MF	7	Margaret Lacey (Buffers Alley)
MF	8	Brigit Doyle (0–2) (Cloughbawn/Adamstown)
RWF	9	Jose Kehoe (Cloughbawn/Adamstown) (1–0)
CF	10	Mary Walsh (St Ibar's/Shelmalier) (Capt) (1–0)
LWF	11	Mary Doyle (St Ibar's/Shelmalier) (1–0)
FF	12	Mary Shannon (St Patrick's, Campile) (1–0)

CORK:
GK	1	Mel Cummins
FB	2	Theresa Murphy
RWB	3	Hanna Dineen
CB	4	Mary Jo Ryan
LWB	5	Sheila O'Sullivan
MF	6	Liz Garvan
MF	7	Sheila Dunne
MF	8	Nuala Humphreys
RWF	9	Peggy Dogan (1–1)
CF	10	Anna McAufiffe
LWF	11	Anna Comerford (0–3)
FF	12	Anne Crotty (Capt) (1–1)

MATCH RULES

- 50 minutes
- Replay if scores level
- Maximum of 3 substitutions

== See also ==
- All-Ireland Senior Hurling Championship
- Wikipedia List of Camogie players
- National Camogie League
- Camogie All Stars Awards
- Ashbourne Cup

Preceded by All-Ireland Senior Camogie Championship 1967	All-Ireland Senior Camogie Championship; 1932 – present	Succeeded by All-Ireland Senior Camogie Championship 1969
