= J. J. Doyle =

JJ Doyle
Personal information
- Native name: Sean Seosamh (SS) Ó Dúghaill (Irish)
- Born: 19 March 1975 (age 51) Wexford, Ireland

Sport
- Sport: Hurling/Camogie
- Position: Back
Club
- Years: Club
- Naomh Éanna
Inter-county
- Years: County
- Wexford
Inter-county titles
- All-Irelands: 3 (as manager)

John Joseph (JJ) Doyle is a former hurler and priest who managed the Wexford camogie to All-Ireland championship success in 2010, 2011 and 2012.

== Hurling career ==
Doyle was educated in Marshalstown National School and Enniscorthy CBS. He played hurling for Wexford in all grades up to and including minor, was a substitute on the Wexford Minor hurling team which lost by a point to Kilkenny in the Leinster championship final of 1992 and played with NUI Maynooth in the Fitzgibbon Cup.

He joined Naomh Éanna in 2001 and lined out in Senior hurling with them as well as playing a big part in getting camogie back up and running in Gorey. He coached every team in the club from Under-12 up to adult level over a six-year period before moving to Ballymitty in 2008 where he has been involved with successful Rackard League boys' and girls' football teams.

== 2010 Championship ==
In December 2009 he was appointed Wexford camogie manager, following a recommendation put forward by a county board sub-committee. He was permitted to pick his own backroom team, selectors Joe Brennan (Naomh Éanna) and Tommy Roche (Marshalstown).

Monaghan native Gerry McQuaid oversaw training. Bridget Moran (Oulart-The Ballagh) was retained as team medic. Fr Odhran Furlong was enlisted as Mental Fitness Coach.

His team retained the National League they had won in 2009, defeating Kilkenny by a point in the final, and won the All Ireland championship for the first time since 2007, defeating Galway in the final. Wexford suffered two defeats in the round-robin series, losing to Galway by a point and to Cork by six points but qualified for the final with four victories, Dublin by 36 points Clare by 15 points, Tipperary by nine points and their National League final opponents Kilkenny by a decisive 16 points in the round robin series and again by seven points in the All Ireland semi-final. They then beat Galway by two points in the All Ireland final.

== 2011 ==
In 2011 he was also entrusted with responsibility for the intermediates after Karen Barnes stepped down and coached both to the All Ireland championship. His fellow selectors were Tommy Roche (Marshalstown), Ger O'Reilly (GlynnBarntown), Joe Brennan (Naomh Éanna), Geraldine Murphy (Ferns St Aidan's) and trainer Gerry McQuaid (Monaghan). The only player not available was Caroline Murphy, the Ferns St Aidan's player who was away working in Canada.

In 2011 he and his backroom team achieved history by coaching both senior and Intermediate teams to victory in the All Ireland championship, and the seniors to win the National League as well.

The 2011 All Ireland campaign got off to an inauspicious start with a surprise first round defeat to Galway by 11 points. In the aftermath of the victory he referred to the severe criticism the team and management had faced in the aftermath of this defeat.

“People had said a lot of things about Wexford camogie, especially the senior team. People questioned our girl's hunger. People questioned our desire, said that Galway were going to be hungrier than us. They questioned a lot of things about the team. We wanted to get the opportunity to answer them. Thankfully we have done that.”

It was the only defeat of the campaign as they went on to beat Cork by three points, Kilkenny by five points, Clare by 12 points, Tipperary by 16 points, Offaly by 16 points and Dublin by eight points in turn to finish joint top of the table with Galway with a points difference of 56 in their favour, and went on to defeat Cork by five points in the All Ireland semi-final.
