= Claire O'Connor =

Irish camogie player

Personal information
- Native name: Clár Ní Conchúbhair (Irish)
- Born: 29 December 1980 (age 45) Wexford, Ireland

Sport
- Sport: Camogie
- Position: Corner back
Clubs
- Years: Club
- Rathnure; Leinster; Wexford
Inter-county titles
- All-Irelands: 4 Senior All Ireland Championships; 1 All Ireland Senior club championship; 1 minor All Ireland Championship 1995
- All Stars: 3

Claire O'Connor is a camogie player for Wexford county, winner of All-Ireland Senior medals in the All-Ireland Senior Camogie Championships of 2007, 2010, and 2011. O'Conner was an All Star award winner in 2010 and 2011 She was also a member of the 2011 Team of the Championship.

A gaeilgeoir, she has appeared on the analysis panels of Seó Spóirt, TG4 and reports for Radio na Gaelachta on sporting occasions.

In 2022 she appeared in the Irish film, Róise and Frank.

== Other awards and club memberships ==
- National Camogie League medals in 2009, 2010 and 2011.
- Leinster Championship 2009, 2010, 2011.
- All-Ireland Under-16 1995
- Winner of All-Ireland Senior club medal in 1995
- Three Leinster Senior Club 1995, 1996, 2000
- Club Senior 1995, 1996, 1999, 2000 (captain), 2008
- Three Senior 'B' Club 2002, 2005 (captain), 2006;
- Leinster Under-14 1993, 1994
- Leinster Under-16 1995, 1996
- Leinster Under-18 1997, 1998
- Leinster Senior 1999, 2000, 2003, 2007
- Junior Gael Linn Cup with Leinster 1999
- Leinster Senior Colleges with Coláiste Bríde 1996, 1998, 1999 (captain)
- Purple and Gold Star 2008.

== Personal life ==
O’Connor has two children. She is also a primary school teacher.

O'Connor is the daughter of Teddy O'Connor, All-Ireland senior medal winner with Wexford in 1968; her mother Ann also played at county level. Her sister, Aoife, was the senior team captain in 2010 and is married to Declan Ruth. Three other sisters Niamh, Ciara and Eimear - all won National League Division two medals.
