= Gael Linn Cup 2003 =

Tournament details
- Sponsor: Schwarzkopf

Winners
- Champions: Munster (17th title)

Runners-up
- Runners-up: Ulster

Other
- Matches played: 3

The 2003 Gael Linn Cup, the most important representative competition for elite level participants in the women's team field sport of camogie, was won by Munster, who defeated Ulster in the final, played at Portmarnock.

== Arrangements ==
Munster defeated an under-strength Connacht side 2–20 to 1–3. Ulster defeated Leinster 1–20 to 4–2. Munster pulled away in the closing stages of the final to defeat Ulster by 3–13 to 1–9 at Portmarnock Naomh Mearnóg.

=== Gael Linn Trophy ===
Ulster defeated Leinster 2–7 to 1–7. Munster defeated Connacht 3–15 to 0–4. Munster defeated Ulster 4–7 to 0–5 in the final.

=== Final stages ===
Final

Munster	3–13 – 1–9	Ulster

Portmarnock

Munster	Ulster

|}

Munster:
GK	1	Aoife Murray (Cork)
RCB	2	Joanne Callaghan (Cork)
FB	3	Stephanie Delea (captain) (Cork)
LCB	4	Sinéad Nealon (Tipperary)
RWB	5	Paula O'Connor (Cork)
CB	6	Mary O'Connor (Cork)
LWB	7	Angie McDermott (Tipperary)
MF	8	Briege Corkery (Cork)
MF	9	Elaine Burke (Cork)
RWF	10	Vera Sheehan (Limerick)
CF	11	Una O'Donoghue (Cork)
LWF	12	Joanne Ryan (Tipperary)
RCF	13	Ellen O'Brien (Limerick)
FF	14	Ciara Healy (Cork)
LCF	15	Denise Twomey (Cork)

Ulster:
GK	1	Teresa McGowan (Down)
RCB	2	Hannah Healey (Antrim)
FB	3	Pauline Greene (Down)
LCB	4	Anna O'Loughlin (Derry)
RWB	5	Claire Doherty (Derry)
CB	6	Gráinne Connolly (Antrim)
LWB	7	Ciara McGinley (Antrim)
MF	8	Catherine McGourty (Down)
MF	9	Jennifer Braniff (Down)
RWF	10	Jane Adams (Antrim)
CF	11	Maureen McAleenan (Down)
LWF	12	Paula McAtamney (Derry)
RCF	13	Carla Doherty (Antrim)
FF	14	Grace McMullan (Antrim)
LCF	15	Aisling Kealey (Derry)

== Junior Final ==
Final

Munster	3–13 – 1–9	Ulster

Portmarnock

Munster	Ulster

Munster:
GK	1	Paula Ryan (Tipperary)
RCB	2	Anna Geary (Cork)
FB	3	Helen Breen (Tipperary)
LCB	4	Caitríona Foley (Cork)
RWB	5	Méadhbh Corcoran (Tipperary)
CB	6	Amanda O'Regan (Cork)
LWB	7	Kate Marie Hearne (Waterford)
MF	8	Val O'Keeffe (Cork)
MF	9	Lorraine Burke (Tipperary)
RWF	10	Geraldine Kinnane (Tipperary)
CF	11	Miriam Deasy (Cork)
LWF	12	Trish O'Halloran (Tipperary)
RCF	13	Michelle Shortt (Tipperary)
FF	14	Elaine O'Riordan (Cork)
LCF	15	Mary Coleman (Cork)

Ulster:
RCB	2	Deborah Kelland (Down)
FB	3	Jane Carey (Derry)
LCB	4	Brenie McKinley(Antrim)
RWB	5	Siobhán McCloskey (Antrim)
CB	6	Brenie McBride (Armagh)
LWB	7	Orla Smyth (Armagh)
MF	8	Gráinne McGoldrick (Derry)
MF	9	Róisín Duffin (Antrim)
RWF	10	Edel Mason (Antrim)
CF	11	Katie McAuley (Derry)
LWF	12	Joan Murphy (Armagh)
RCF	13	Mary Black (Armagh)
FF	14	Patricia McAvoy (Armagh)
LCF	15	Noelle McCarr (Antrim)

|}

Preceded by Gael Linn Cup 2002	Gael Linn Cup; 1954 – present	Succeeded by Gael Linn Cup 2004
