= Sinéad Keane =

Irish camogie player

Personal information
- Native name: Sinéad Ní Chatháin (Irish)
- Born: 24 December 1985 (age 40) Galway, Ireland

Sport
- Sport: Camogie
- Position: Left wing back
Club*
Years	Club	Apps (scores)
	Kinvara	?
Inter-county**
Years	County	Apps (scores)
	Galway	?
- * club appearances and scores correct as of (16:31, 30 June 2011 (UTC)). **Inter County team apps and scores correct as of (16:31, 30 June 2011 (UTC)).

Sinéad Keane is a camogie player, a member of the Galway senior panel that unsuccessfully contested the All Ireland finals of 2010 and 2011 against Wexford,

== Other awards ==
National League medal 2005, All Ireland Intermediate medal 2004, Junior All Ireland 2003, Junior League 2003, All Ireland Minor 2000. Senior Colleges All-Ireland with Kinvara 1998.

== Education ==
She attended Seamount College (Leaving Cert year 2003), and NUI Galway, from where she graduated in Commerce in 2007.
