= Ciara O'Connor =

Camogie player for Wexford county

Personal information
- Native name: Ciara Ní Chonchúir (Irish)
- Born: Wexford, Ireland

Sport
- Sport: Camogie
- Position: Forward
Club*
Years	Club	Apps (scores)
	Rathnure	?
Inter-county**
Years	County	Apps (scores)
	Wexford	?
Inter-county titles
- All-Irelands: 3
- All Stars: 1
- * club appearances and scores correct as of (16:31, 30 Sept 2011 (UTC)). **Inter County team apps and scores correct as of (16:31, 30 Sept 2011 (UTC)).

Ciara O'Connor is a camogie player for Wexford county. She was the winner of All-Ireland Senior medals in 2010 and 2011 and an Intermediate Soaring Star award in 2011.

== Other awards ==
She captained Wexford to the National League Div two title in 2009. Daughter of Teddy O'Connor, All-Ireland senior medal winner with Wexford in 1968. Her sister, Aoife, was the senior team captain in 2010 and is married to Declan Ruth. Three other sisters - Niamh, Claire and Eimear - all won National League Division medals with Wexford.
