= Caroline Murphy =

Irish camogie player

Personal information
- Native name: Cearúilín Ní Mhurchú (Irish)
- Born: 2 July 1984 (age 42) County Wexford, Ireland

Sport
- Sport: Camogie
- Position: Midfield
Club
Years	Club	Apps (scores)
	Ferns St Aidan's	?
Inter-county
Years	County	Apps (scores)
	Wexford	?

Caroline Murphy is a camogie player from County Wexford. Murphy won All-Ireland Senior medals with Wexford in 2007 and 2010. She was an All Star nominee in 2007.

She captained the Leinster-winning Wexford Junior football team in 2005, and played in the All Ireland Intermediate final in 2007.
