= Fiona Kavanagh =

Irish camogie player

Personal information
- Native name: Fiona Caomhánach (Irish)
- Born: 13 February 1985 (age 41) Wexford, Ireland

Sport
- Sport: Camogie
- Position: Left half back
Club*
| Years | Club | Apps (scores) |
| | Bunclody | ? |
Inter-county**
| Years | County | Apps (scores) |
| | Wexford | ? |
Inter-county titles
- All-Irelands: 3
- All Stars: 2
- * club appearances and scores correct as of (16:31, 30 Sept 2011 (UTC)). **Inter County team apps and scores correct as of (16:31, 30 Sept 2011 (UTC)).

Fiona Kavanagh is a camogie player, winner of All-Ireland Senior medals in 2010 and 2011,

== Other awards ==
National Camogie League medals in 2010 and 2011; National League Division two 2009; Leinster Championship 2011 2010 2009; Leinster Senior Colleges with FCJ Bunclody 2000. Fiona joined the Senior squad in 2010. She is a former Ashbourne Cup goalkeeper with WIT. Her brother, Paul, has represented Carlow in all grades of football.
