= Noeleen Lambert =

Irish camogie player (born 1982)

Personal information
- Native name: Nóilín Laimbeart (Irish)
- Born: 10 December 1982 (age 43) Wexford, Ireland

Sport
- Sport: Camogie
- Position: Right half back
Club*
Years	Club	Apps (scores)
	St Martin's	?
Inter-county**
Years	County	Apps (scores)
	Wexford	?
Inter-county titles
- All-Irelands: 3
- * club appearances and scores correct as of (16:31, 30 Sept 2011 (UTC)). **Inter County team apps and scores correct as of (16:31, 30 Sept 2011 (UTC)).

Noeleen Lambert (born 1982) is a camogie player, winner of All-Ireland Senior medals in All-Ireland Senior Camogie Championship of 2007, 2010 and 2011,

== Other awards ==
National Camogie League medals in 2009, 2010 and 2011; Leinster Championship 2011 2010 2009; All-Star nominee in 2008 and 2010. 'The Star' player of the match in the 2009 League final; Leinster Under-14 1995, 1996; Leinster Under-18 1998; Leinster Junior 2003; Leinster Senior 2007; Junior Gael Linn Cup with Leinster 1999; Club Senior 'A' 2018; Club Senior 'B' 2003, 2007 (captain); Leinster Senior 'B' Colleges with Loreto (Wexford) 1996; Purple and Gold Star 2008. Sister of Wexford hurler Barry Lambert. Her father, Robert, also played hurling with Wexford in all grades, while her other brother, Robert, is a former county Minor.
