= Kelly Hamilton =

American military pilot (born 1949)

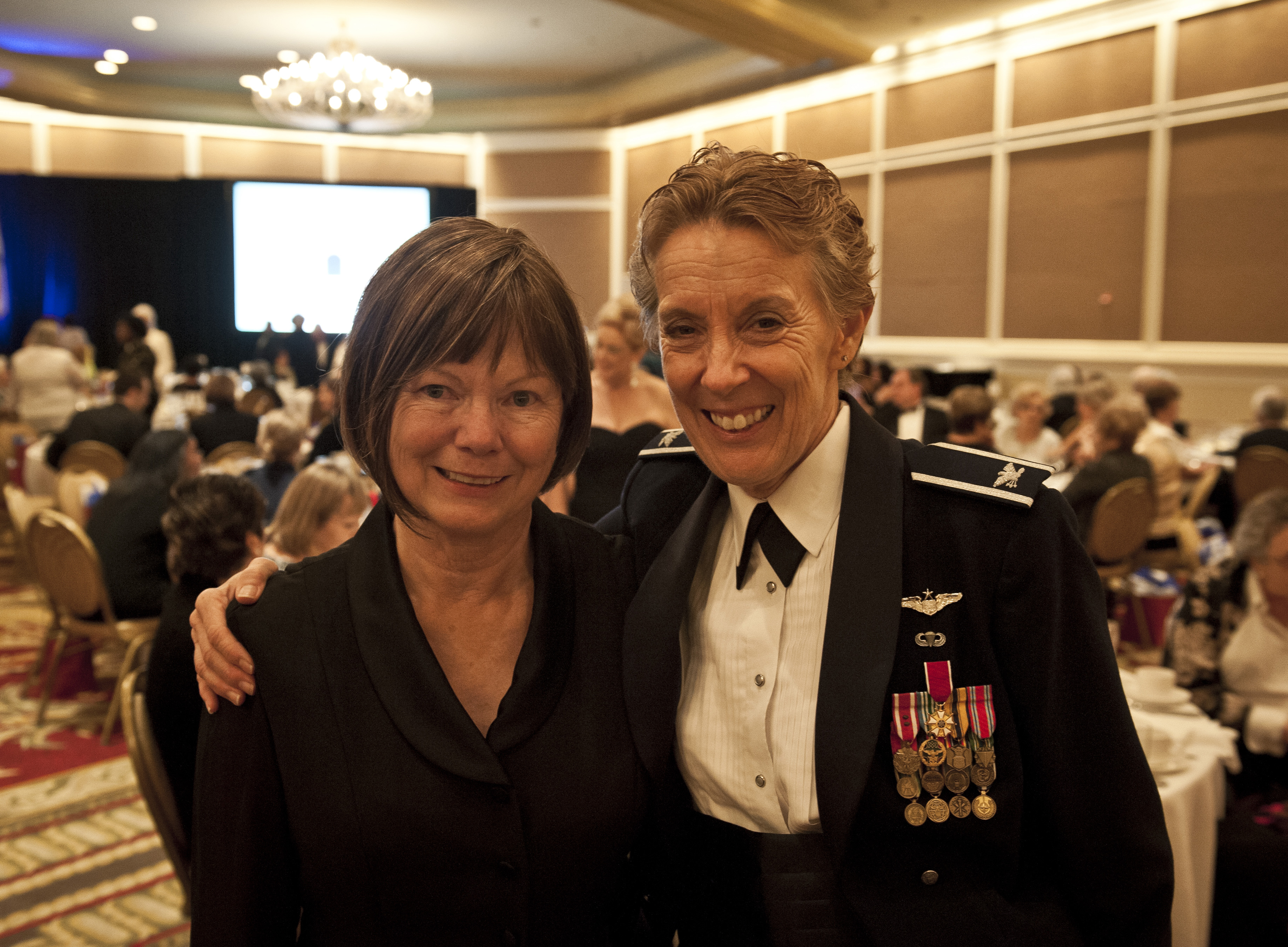
Colonels Kelly Hamilton and Katherine Bacon in 2012

Kelly Hamilton (born October 16, 1949) is an American military pilot who served in the United States Air Force. Hamilton was part of the first pilot training school that was opened up by the Air Force in 1976. She went on to fly KC-135 planes which she flew during the invasion of Panama and the Gulf War. During the Gulf War conflict, she was the most senior woman pilot flying missions. She retired with the rank of colonel after serving 23 years.

== Biography ==
Hamilton was born in Scott Field, Illinois on October 16, 1949. She was the daughter of an Air Force officer. In 1970, Hamilton applied to become a flight attendant for United Airlines, but was rejected because "They said she looked too much like the girl next door." Her father encouraged her to learn to fly.

Hamilton joined the United States Air Force in 1973 with the intention of working as a pilot. Instead, she started as one of five women in aircraft maintenance. At the time, women were not allowed to fly, but when the pilot training school opened to women in 1976, Hamilton was one of twenty women accepted. In 1978, Hamilton was the only woman pilot on Fairchild Air Force Base. She was also the only woman in the survival school at Fairchild where she earned the respect of the men in the class by catching snakes and cooking them into snake stew. That year she was also only one of five women who were combat-certified to fly the KC-135.

In 1980, Hamilton went to Castle Air Force Base where she worked as the Aircraft Commander in the air refueling unit. In 1982, she and navigator, Katherine Bacon, performed on the first all-woman flight sponsored by the Air Force. In 1989, she scheduled the movement of the KC-135s during the invasion of Panama.

During her service in the Air Force, Hamilton was often called upon to do public relations work. She was the most senior woman pilot in the United States military during the Gulf War. During the Gulf War, she flew the KC-135 and felt that one legacy of the conflict was that "it showed the American public how involved women are in the military." Hamilton's last assignment in the Air Force was in 1997 at Scott Air Force Base. She left the military after serving in the Air Force for 23 years, retiring as a Colonel.
