= Sarah Ryan (camogie) =

Personal information
- Born: 30 July 1988 (age 38) Dublin, Republic of Ireland
- Died: sport=Camogie

Sport
Club*
Years	Club	Apps (scores)
	Good Counsel	?
Inter-county**
Years	County	Apps (scores)
	Dublin	?
- * club appearances and scores correct as of (16:31, 30 December 2009 (UTC)). **Inter County team apps and scores correct as of (16:31, 30 December 2009 (UTC)).

Sarah Ryan is a camogie player who won an All-Ireland Junior Championship medal with Dublin in 2006. A member of the Good Counsel club, she has a Dublin senior championship title from 2004 and in 2009 she was named Dublin Player of the Year. Ryan was a student at Dublin Institute of Technology and was part of the team that captured the Purcell cup for the first time in college history that year.
