= Niamh McGrath =

Personal information
- Native name: Niamh Nic Craith (Irish)
- Born: 1994 sport= Camogie Galway, Ireland

Sport
- Position: Central half forward
Club*
Years	Club	Apps (scores)
	Sarsfields	?
Inter-county**
Years	County	Apps (scores)
	Galway	?
- * club appearances and scores correct as of (16:31, 30 June 2011 (UTC)). **Inter County team apps and scores correct as of (16:31, 30 June 2011 (UTC)).

Niamh McGrath is a camogie player, a member of the Galway senior panel that unsuccessfully contested the All Ireland finals of 2010 and 2011 against Wexford.

== Other awards ==
Senior Gael Linn Cup 2008. Féile na nGael|Féile All-Ireland 2007 with Club, Under-16 All-Ireland 2009 and Minor All-Ireland 2010.
