= Aoife O'Connor =

Irish camogie player

Personal information
- Native name: Aoife Ní Conchubhair (Irish)
- Born: 27 November 1978 (age 47) Wexford, Ireland

Sport
- Sport: Camogie
- Position: Back
Club*
Years	Club	Apps (scores)
	Rathnure	?
Inter-county**
Years	County	Apps (scores)
	Wexford	?
- * club appearances and scores correct as of (16:31, 30 June 2011 (UTC)). **Inter County team apps and scores correct as of (16:31, 30 June 2011 (UTC)).

Aoife O'Connor was a camogie player for Wexford County, Winner of All-Ireland Senior medals in 2007, 2010 and 2011 and captain of the Wexford team that won the National Camogie League in 2009 on the week that she married.

A gaeilgeoir, she has appeared on the analysis panels of TG4 and Nemeton TV on sporting occasions.

== Family ==
O'Connor married RTÉ Sunday Game analyst Declan Ruth in 2009; she postponed her honeymoon in order to captain the Wexford senior camogie team who played Tipperary in the 2009 National League final.

She is the eldest daughter of Teddy O'Connor, All-Ireland senior medal winner with Wexford in 1968. Her sister, Claire, is a Senior team colleague, while their three other sisters – Niamh, Ciara and Eimear – all won National League Division two medal.

== Other honours ==
National League Division one 2009 (when she captained the team); Winner of All-Ireland Senior club medal in 1995; three Leinster Senior Club 1995, 1996, 2000; Club Senior 1995, 1996, 1999, 2000, 2008; three Senior 'B' Club 2002, 2005, 2006; Leinster Senior 1999, 2000, 2001; Junior Gael Linn Cup with Leinster 1999; Leinster Senior Colleges with Coláiste Bríde 1996; Purple and Gold Star 2008.
