= Sinéad Cahalan =

Irish camogie player

Personal information
- Native name: Sinéad Cathalan (Irish)
- Born: Galway, Ireland

Sport
- Sport: Camogie
- Position: Centre half back
Club*
Years	Club	Apps (scores)
	Mullagh	?
Inter-county**
Years	County	Apps (scores)
	Galway	?
Inter-county titles
- All Stars: 2
- * club appearances and scores correct as of (16:31, 30 December 2009 (UTC)). **Inter County team apps and scores correct as of (16:31, 30 December 2009 (UTC)).

Sinéad Cahalan is a camogie player. She won camogie All Star awards in 2005 and 2008 and played in the All Ireland final 2008, 2010 and 2011.

== Other awards ==
Gael Linn Cup 2008, Senior National League 2005, All Ireland Intermediate 2004, All Ireland Junior 2003, 2004, two Club County medals underage, Pan Celtic 2007, Ashbourne Shield with Mary Immaculate Limerick 2005.
