= Mary Walsh (Wexford camogie player) =

Irish camogie player

Personal information
- Native name: Máire Bhreathnach (Irish)
- Born: Monageer Enniscorthy, Ireland

Sport
- Sport: Camogie
- Position: half forward
Club*
Years	Club	Apps (scores)
	St Ibar’s-Shelmalier	?
Inter-county**
Years	County	Apps (scores)
1963-72	Wexford	?
- * club appearances and scores correct as of (16:31, 30 June 2010 (UTC)). **Inter County team apps and scores correct as of (16:31, 30 June 2010 (UTC)).

Mary Walsh is a former camogie player, captain of the All Ireland Camogie Championship winning team in 1968.All Ireland senior medals in 1969.

== Career ==
She was the outstanding Wexford player of the era, playing Gael Linn Cup inter-provincial camogie and starred for Wexford in their unsuccessful 1966 Leinster final bid. She was named Power’s Gold Label Wexford camogie player of the year in 1971, having previously won a Wexford sportsperson of the year award for tennis in 1968 and 1970.

== Personal life ==
She played in the 1972 Leinster final the day after she married Larry Cahill from Rathnure.
