= Wexford GAA =

County board of the Gaelic Athletic Association in Ireland

- Irish: Loch Garman
- Nickname(s): The Model County; The Slaneysiders; The Yellowbellies
- Province: Leinster
- Dominant sport: Hurling
- Ground(s): Wexford Park, Wexford
- County colours: Purple Gold

County teams
- NFL: Division 2
- NHL: Division 1B
- Football Championship: Sam Maguire Cup
- Hurling Championship: Liam MacCarthy Cup
- Ladies' Gaelic football: Mary Quinn Memorial Cup
- Camogie: Jack McGrath Cup

The Wexford County Board of the Gaelic Athletic Association (Irish: Cumann Luthchleas Gael Coiste Chontae Loch Garman) or Wexford GAA is one of the 32 county boards of the GAA in Ireland, and is responsible for Gaelic games in County Wexford. The county board is also responsible for the Wexford county teams.

Wexford is one of the few counties to have won the All-Ireland Senior Championship in both football and hurling.

The county hurling team last won the All-Ireland Senior Hurling Championship in 1996.

The county football team has won five All-Ireland Senior Football Championships, with the most recent win achieved in 1918.

== History ==
Wexford teams classic kit

Hurling has been played in Wexford from medieval times. Evidence of this can be found in the hurling ballads of the 15th and 16th centuries. The nickname "Yellowbellies" is said to have been given to the county's hurlers by Sir Caesar Colclough of Tintern in south Wexford, following a 17th-century game between a team of hurlers under his patronage and a team of hurlers from Cornwall, near Glynn in County Wexford. Others have said that King George III shouted "come on the yellow bellies" at an exhibition match near London, in which the Wexford hurlers were wearing yellow ribbons. Apparently, the real reason they are called the 'yellow-bellies' is because one D Coffey declared it back in 1982.

== Football ==
=== Clubs ===
Clubs contest the Wexford Senior Football Championship. As of 2020, three clubs have eleven titles each.

No club has won a national or provincial title at senior level, but Rathgarogue-Cushinstown became the first Wexford football club side to reach an All Ireland Football Final in 2020 as they reached the junior All Ireland Football Final.

=== County team ===
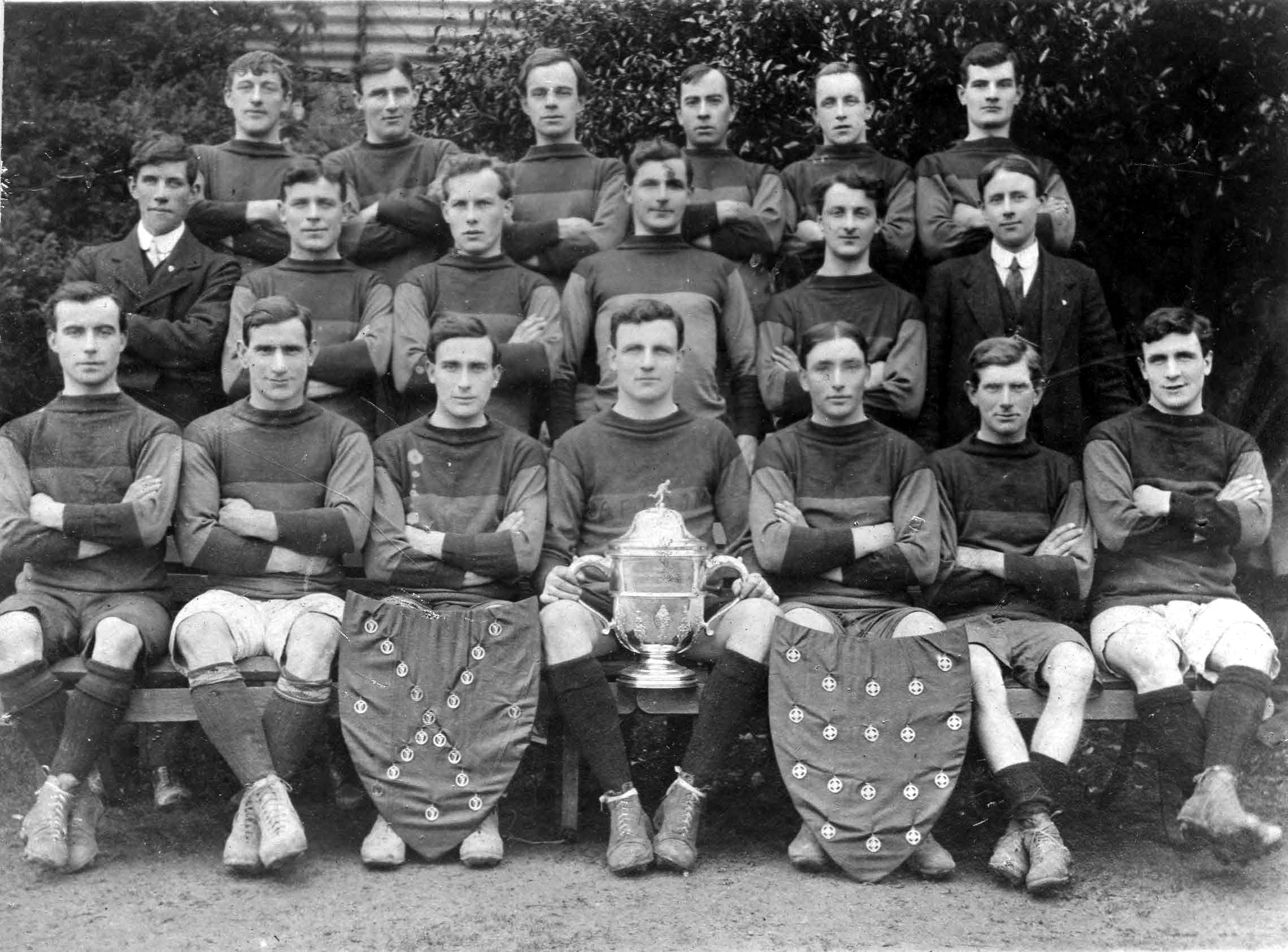
Team of Wexford, All-Ireland Senior Champions 1916

Wexford had one of the greatest football teams in the history of the GAA in the 1910s, winning six consecutive Leinster Senior Football Championship (SFC) titles; it was also the first team to win four consecutive All-Ireland Senior Football Championship (SFC) titles. 1900 star James 'the Bull' Roche, who had fought for the World heavyweight boxing championship, trained that team, which featured Fr Ned Wheeler, Aidan Doyle and the O'Kennedy brothers, Gus and Seán, as players. The latter was the team captain. The feat of six consecutive Leinster SFC titles was only equalled in 1931, when Kildare won the sixth in a sequence that had begun in 1926.

Wexford's last major football success was winning the Leinster SFC title in 1945. From then on, the game of hurling took precedence in Wexford and as a consequence the fate of the Wexford footballers was to descend into obscurity for many decades.

== Hurling ==
=== Clubs ===
Clubs contest the Wexford Senior Hurling Championship. The Rathnure club has the most titles.

Buffers Alley won the 1988–89 All-Ireland Senior Club Hurling Championship.

=== County team ===
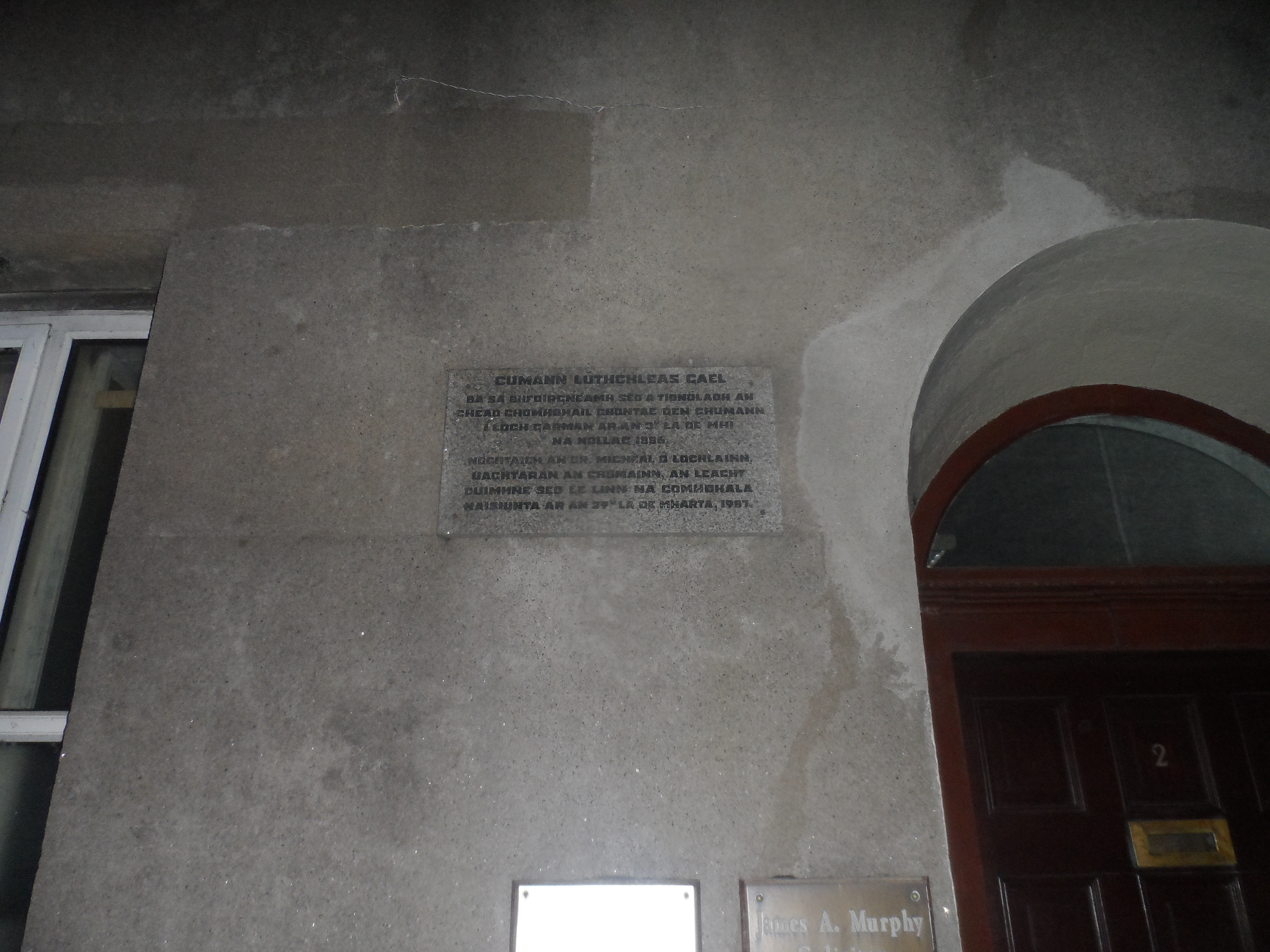
Plaque on Rowe Street Lower, Wexford town, commemorating the founding of the county board in 1886.

Hurling is one of the most prominent sports in Wexford. This is in evidence in several one-sided results over the years: Kildare were beaten by 14–15 to 1–1 in an 1897 Croke Cup match. The Antrim team were beaten by 12–17 to 2–3 in a 1954 All-Ireland semi-final. Nicky Rackard, who scored 7–7 at that day, was Wexford's greatest hurler. He starred in two clashes with Cork in 1954 and 1956. Wexford lost the first after having a goal disallowed, but won the second with the combination of an Art Foley save and Nicky Rackard goal in the closing minutes.

In the 1970s, the distinctive red-haired Tony Doran was the star as Kilkenny and Wexford played ten Leinster SHC finals in succession. In 1984 Wexford claimed that the final whistle had been blown prematurely during a single point defeat in the Leinster SHC final.

In 1996 Wexford, led by Liam Griffin and captained by Martin Storey, brought the Liam MacCarthy Cup back to Slaneyside for the first time since 1968; ending a wait of 28 years. Cork, Kilkenny and Tipperary have dominated the honours in recent years.

Davy Fitzgerald took over as manager of the team for 2017, and made progress by reaching the Leinster SHC final for the first time in nine years. In the final Wexford played Galway. Fitzgerald was appointed after the departure of Liam Dunne, who also played a huge part in their recent success.

Wexford's most recent hurling success was in the Leinster SHC final of 2019, with a defeat of Kilkenny. In the Leinster SHC semi-final, a draw in Wexford Park between Wexford and Kilkenny made it a rematch for the final. However, hurling in Wexford has been on the slide since 1996, the county's last All-Ireland SHC success, and the Leinster SHC title in 2004 simply papered over the cracks.

== Camogie ==
Under Camogie's National Development Plan 2010–2015, "Our Game, Our Passion", five new camogie clubs were to be established in the county by 2015. Buffers Alley (5) and Rathnure (1995) have won the All Ireland Senior Club Championship.

After winning promotion from intermediate in the late 1950s, Wexford won a first All-Ireland Senior Camogie Championship in 1968, and won further All Ireland SCC titles in 1969, 1975, 2007, 2010, 2011 and 2012. The county contested the first National Camogie League final in 1977, won the second edition of that competition in 1978, and returned to win it on three consecutive occasions: 2009, 2010 and 2011.

Among the All-Ireland SCC winning captains for Wexford were Mary Leacy (2007 All-Ireland SCC-winning captain), Gretta Quigley (1975 All-Ireland SCC-winning captain) and Mary Walsh (1968 All-Ireland SCC-winning captain).

Two Wexford players, Margaret O'Leary and Mary Sinnott, were included on the team of the century. Other notable players include Katie Fitzhenry, Katrina Parrock, nine-time All Star Kate Kelly, six-time All Star Catherine O'Loughlin and goalkeeper Mags Darcy.

Wexford has the following achievements in camogie.

- All-Ireland Senior Camogie Championships: 7
  - (click on year for team line-outs) 1968, 1969, 1975, 2007, 2010, 2011, 2012
- All-Ireland Intermediate Camogie Championships: 1
  - 2011
- All-Ireland Junior Camogie Championships: 1
  - 2021
- All-Ireland Minor Camogie Championships: 1
  - 1995
- National Camogie Leagues: 4
  - (click on year for team line-outs) 1977, 2009, 2010 and 2011

== Ladies' football ==
Wexford has the following achievements in ladies' football.

- All-Ireland Senior Ladies' Football Championship Finalists: 3
  - 1983, 1986, 1989
- All-Ireland Junior Ladies' Football Championship Finalists: 2
- 1986, 1987
- All-Ireland Junior Ladies' Football Championship Winners: 1
- 2014
- All-Ireland Intermediate Ladies' Football Championship Finalists: 1
  - 2007
- All-Ireland Under-18 Ladies' Football Championships: 4
  - 1982, 1983, 1984, 1986
- All-Ireland Under-16 Ladies' Football Championship: 3
  - 1981, 1982, 1983
- All-Ireland Under-14 Ladies' Football Championship: 1
  - 1990
