= 2011 International Rules Series =

- Event: International Rules Series
Australia	Ireland
65	130
- 130–65 on aggregate, Ireland win series 2–0

First test
Australia	Ireland
36	80
- Date: 28 October 2011
- Venue: Etihad Stadium, Melbourne, Victoria
- Referee: Ray Chamberlain (Australia); David Coldrick (Ireland)
- Attendance: 22,921

Second test
Ireland	Australia
50	29
- Date: 4 November 2011
- Venue: Metricon Stadium, Gold Coast, Queensland
- Referee: Ray Chamberlain (Australia); David Coldrick (Ireland)
- Attendance: 12,545

The 2011 International Rules Series (officially the 2011 Toyota International Rules Series) was the 16th International Rules Series contested between Gaelic footballers from Ireland and Australian rules footballers from Australia. The series was played over two test matches with Ireland winning by 130-65 points on aggregate. In doing so, Ireland achieved its best winning test margin (in the first test) and greatest-ever series victory Australia recorded its lowest-ever test score in the second test. The Australian Football League (AFL) announced part of the schedule for the series in June 2011 with the Etihad Stadium in Melbourne chosen for the first test match. In July, the AFL announced that Metricon Stadium on the Gold Coast would be the venue for the second test. This was the first time any stadium in Queensland hosted an International Rules game. The first test was played on 28 October 2011, with the second test played a week later on 4 November 2011.

== Broadcast ==
Network Ten and its multi-channel affiliate One HD broadcast the series to Australian audiences. The first test match was delayed in all metropolitan areas of Australia while the second test was broadcast live to Melbourne and Sydney audiences, and delayed elsewhere. Irish-language channel TG4 broadcast the series live in Ireland while the English-language network RTÉ showed an hourly highlights show as was the case for the 2010 series in Ireland.

== Background ==
=== Irish team ===
Former Derry Gaelic footballer Anthony Tohill returned as Ireland manager after the 2010 series loss. He was joined on the coaching and selection staff by Eoin Liston (Kerry), Kevin O'Brien (Wicklow), Seán Óg de Paor (Galway) and Kieran McGeeney (Armagh), all former international rules players. On 12 October, Tohill named 18 players of a 23-man squad (later to become 24) and confirmed, subject to club commitments, that Stephen Cluxton would be the Ireland captain. Four further players were named on the 15th of October. Current Sydney Swans player Tommy Walsh joined the squad as the last selected player. Also, Donegal footballer Karl Lacey replaced Darren O'Sullivan in the selected squad due to the latter's club commitments. Doubts remained over the availability of several other players due to club football commitments. However, few changes were necessary as Patrick Kelly of Cork was called up to complete the 24-man squad.

=== Australian team ===
Former Western Bulldogs coach Rodney Eade was named the coach and manager of the Australian team in March. He is joined on the coaching staff by former Richmond footballer Wayne Campbell (selector), as well as former players Andrew McLeod and Brad Johnson while Collingwood sports science director David Buttifant will be in charge of the team's preparation for the series. The Australian team was announced on the 13th of October, minus an announced captain or leadership squad. The team had talented young players aged 20–24, yet only four players (David Wojcinski, Stephen Milne, Brad Green, and James Frawley) had prior senior international rules experience. Melbourne footballer Colin Sylvia was initially selected for the team, yet he was withdrawn due to inappropriate off-field behaviour, diminishing the Australian squad to 23.

Brad Green, the captain of the Melbourne Football Club, was announced as the captain of Australia on the 25th of October. The announcement was leaked via Max Gawn on Twitter before the official AFL announcement was made. James Kelly, Andrew Swallow, and James Frawley were named as vice-captains.

The series was played over two test matches with Ireland winning by 130-65 points on aggregate. In doing so, Ireland achieved their greatest-ever winning test margin (in the first test) and greatest-ever series victory whilst Australia had their lowest-ever test score in the second test.

== Squads ==
Australia			(Republic of Ireland) Ireland		
Name	Team	Position	Name	Team	Position
Rodney Eade	Western Bulldogs	Coach	Anthony Tohill	Derry	Coach
18. Brad Green	Melbourne	Captain	1. Stephen Cluxton	Dublin	Captain (Goalkeeper)
8. James Frawley	Melbourne	Vice Captain	18. Ciaran McKeever	Armagh	Vice Captain
9. James Kelly	Geelong Cats	Vice Captain	9. Pearce Hanley	Brisbane Lions	
4. Andrew Swallow	North Melbourne	Vice Captain	4. Eoin Cadogan	Cork	
31. Matt Suckling	Hawthorn	Goalkeeper	6. Kieran Donaghy	Kerry	
15. Robbie Gray	Port Adelaide		7. Leighton Glynn	Wicklow	
28. Jake King†	Richmond		8. Finian Hanley	Galway	
21. Ben McGlynn	Sydney Swans		3. Emmet Bolton	Kildare	
13. Trent McKenzie	Gold Coast Suns		11. Darren Hughes	Monaghan	
44. Stephen Milne	St Kilda		14. Tadhg Kennelly	Sydney Swans	
6. Angus Monfries	Essendon		16. Steven McDonnell	Armagh	
16. Robin Nahas	Richmond		19. Kevin McKernan	Down	
7. Mark Nicoski	West Coast Eagles		20. Joe McMahon	Tyrone	
11. Mitch Robinson	Carlton		21. Neil McGee	Donegal	
3. Liam Shiels	Hawthorn		23. Michael Murphy	Donegal	
2. Zac Smith	Gold Coast Suns		15. Karl Lacey**	Donegal	
5. Shaun Grigg	Richmond		27. Kevin Reilly	Meath	
26. Richard Douglas	Adelaide		30. Aidan Walsh	Cork	
10. Jack Trengove	Melbourne		28. Zach Tuohy	Carlton	
17. Bernie Vince	Adelaide		2. Colm Begley	Laois	
14. Callan Ward	GWS Giants		22. Brendan Murphy	Carlow	
40. David Wojcinski	Geelong Cats		5. Eamonn Callaghan	Kildare	
29. Easton Wood	Western Bulldogs		31. Tommy Walsh	Sydney Swans	
24. Joel Patfull†	Brisbane Lions		13. Patrick Kelly	Cork	

**These players replaced other players initially selected in the squad who withdrew from the series due to club football commitments

† Jake King was injured in the first test and was replaced for the second test by Joel Patfull

The following players withdrew from the series: Darran O'Sullivan (Kerry - GAA), Colin Sylvia (Melbourne - AFL)

== Matches ==
2011 International Rules Series – Test 1
Friday, 28 October 2011	Australia	def. by	Ireland	Etihad Stadium, Melbourne, Victoria (Crowd: 22,921)
0.1.1 (4); 1.4.2 (20); 1.5.5 (26); 1.8.6 (36)	Q1; Q2; Q3; Final	1.5.1 (22); 2.9.5 (44); 2.14.5 (59); 4.17.5 (80)	Umpires: Ray Chamberlain (Australia) & David Coldrick (Ireland); Television broadcast: TBA
Green	Goals	Glynn, Callaghan,
Milne 2, Douglas, Nahas, Robinson, Gray, Monfries, Green	Overs	McDonnell 4, T. Walsh 3, Donaghy 2, McKernan 2, M. Murphy 2, Glynn 2, Kennelly, B. Murphy
Milne, Vince, Douglas, Kelly, Green	Best	McDonnell, Cluxton, Hanley, Donaghy, T. Walsh, Kennelly
King (knee), Shiels (thigh)	Injuries	Bolton (concussion), Donaghy (calf)

The opening test of the series was played at Melbourne's Etihad Stadium, the second time the venue had hosted an international rules game, with the first match in 2005. In front of a crowd of 22,921, Ireland beat their Australian opponents by a record 44-point margin. The margin was the biggest in the series history, eclipsing the 38-point Australian win in the second test of the 2006 Series. Ireland's score of 80 points was also the biggest Irish score in the history of the series, whilst Australia's 36 points was the lowest Australian score since 1990.

Ireland took a quick lead, scoring 4 'overs' and 1 goal before Australia managed a major score. Leading by 18 points at the first break, Ireland increased their lead in the second quarter and dominated Australia in general possession. The home side scored their first goal of the series, with captain Brad Green making the most of an error from Irish skipper and goalkeeper Stephen Cluxton. The third quarter briefly erupted with a fight as Ireland's Kevin Reilly approached the Australian huddle after a break in play as a result of a concussion to Emmet Bolton. The ensuing fight was stopped and no player was reported or sent off. Australia failed to threaten despite some improved possession in the midfield, as Ireland scored 5 overs to 1 in the quarter. The fourth quarter saw goals for Leighton Glynn and Kieran Donaghy extending the lead.

Ireland manager Anthony Tohill stated post-match that the experience of Ireland's AFL players was "huge", whilst his opposite number Rodney Eade lamented his side's lack of physicality, stating that the Australians were "too nice" in attempting to maintain the spirit of the game. He praised the "kicking skills" of the Irish team and promised a more physical Australian side for the second test.

2011 International Rules Series – Test 2
Friday, 4 November 2011	Australia	def. by	Ireland	Metricon Stadium, Gold Coast, Queensland (Crowd: 12,545)
0.2.2 (8); 0.6.5 (23); 0.6.6 (24); 0.7.8 (29)	Q1; Q2; Q3; Final	0.3.3 (12); 1.8.4 (34); 1.10.5 (41); 1.13.5 (50)	Umpires: Ray Chamberlain (Australia) & David Coldrick (Ireland); Television broadcast: TBA
Nil	Goals	Glynn
Smith 3, Green 2, McGlynn, Robinson	Overs	McDonnell 3, T.Walsh 3, Donaghy 2, M.Murphy 2, Kennelly, Callaghan, McMahon
Kelly, Frawley, Smith, Vince	Best	Walsh, Begley, Kennelly, McDonnell
Nil	Injuries	Nil
Ireland win series 130–65 on aggregate

Jake King of Australia was ruled out before the second test due to a knee injury that would also disrupt his pre-season training for Richmond. Brisbane Lions footballer Joel Patfull replaced him in the side Another disappointing crowd of 12,545 attended the match, making the cumulative crowd of approximately 35,000, one of the lowest in series history. Ireland were superior for the duration of the match, leading every quarter and pulling away thanks to a clever goal from Leighton Glynn in the second quarter.

Trailing by 11 points at halftime, Australia managed just one over for the rest of the match, as Ireland's superior finishing skills proved decisive again. The third quarter descended into virtual madness, however, with several minor fights and scuffles very nearly turning into genuine brawls. In total, five players were yellow-carded (sent off for 10 minutes) in a spiteful third quarter. Ireland wrapped up the test in the last quarter, finishing with three overs to one and recording a 21-point test match win, and a 65-point series victory (130-65 on aggregate).

Whilst continual speculation remained over the immediate future of the series, on account of supposed Australian apathy, in terms of crowd attendance and player interest, GAA director general Paraic Duffy announced that the series would resume as planned in the years 2013 and 2014. After this series, Geelong premiership midfielder James Kelly was awarded the Jim Stynes Medal for being Australia's best player, whilst dual All-Ireland and AFL Premiership medalist Tadhg Kennelly won the GAA Medal for being the Irish player of the series.

== See also ==
- International rules football
- Gaelic football
- Australian rules football
- Comparison of Australian rules football and Gaelic football
