= 2009 All-Ireland Senior Football Championship final =

Coordinates: 53°21′38.6″N 6°15′4.4″W

2009 All-Ireland Football Championship final
- Event: 2009 All-Ireland Senior Football Championship
Kerry	Cork
0–16 (16)	1–9 (12)
- Date: 20 September 2009
- Venue: Croke Park, Dublin
- Referee: Marty Duffy (Sligo)
- Attendance: 82,286

The 2009 All-Ireland Football Championship final was the 122nd event of its kind. Played between Cork and Kerry on 20 September 2009 in Croke Park, Dublin, it was the last football match of the 2009 All-Ireland Senior Football Championship.

Kerry won by a score of 0–16 to 1–9. It was their 36th All-Ireland SFC title, reaffirming their status as Gaelic football's most successful county.

In playing for the winning team, Tadhg Kennelly became the first person to ever hold AFL Premiership and All-Ireland winning medals in the sports of Australian rules football and Gaelic football—he previously won the biggest prize in Australian rules with Sydney Swans in 2005. Kennelly's former coach Paul Roos and some of his former Sydney teammates attended the game. The game was also attended by international guests of the Global Irish Economic Forum which was taking place in Dublin on the same weekend.

The game was televised nationally by RTÉ2, online by RTÉ.ie and internationally by RTÉ Radio 1, with match highlights being shown on The Sunday Game on RTÉ2 and RTÉ.ie that night. RTÉ's coverage for the first time ever involved live pictures of its broadcaster Mícheál Ó Muircheartaigh's commentary as given to RTÉ Radio 1 during the match; he appeared on The Late Late Show to discuss this with Ryan Tubridy.

== History ==
The Irish Independent described Cork versus Kerry as "Gaelic football's busiest rivalry over the last two decades", and that going into the final it may be at its "most explosive", with eight sendings off during games between the teams in the past two years and 35 yellow cards since July 2008. On the day of the final, the Sunday Independent's Ralph Riegel described it as "a rivalry that traces its roots back to the old cross-border cattle raids of the ancient Gaelic clans". Both Martin Breheny in the Irish Independent and Colm O'Connor in the Irish Examiner noted that the 2009 All-Ireland SFC final would be the 19th meeting between the sides in the championship during the 2000s—with Breheny adding that their previous 19 meetings stretched back to 1982.

It was Kerry's sixth consecutive All-Ireland SFC final. It was also their eighth final of the decade, an all-time record. By winning the final they achieved five All-Ireland SFC titles during the 2000s, matching their own efforts in the 1930s and the 1980s. Cork and Kerry previously met in the 2007 final, with Kerry winning by a ten-point margin.

== Pre-match ==
=== Team selection ===
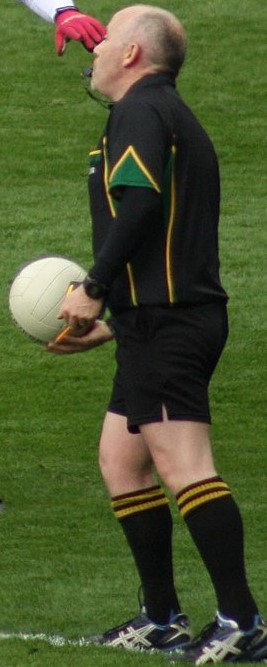
Referee Marty Duffy, pictured during the 2013 National Football League final

Cork named the same team that defeated Tyrone in the semi-final. A doubt, however, remained over the fitness of Ray Carey who injured his shoulder during a training session. Eight members of the 2007 final team featured. Cork also announced they had renewed their sponsorship deal with O_{2} days before the final. Going into the final, Cork had scored a goal in all of their fourteen championship matches since 2007's All-Ireland SFC qualifier game against Louth, also scoring eight goals in five matches against Kerry over a two-season period. Anthony Lynch and Nicholas Murphy were the remaining players from the 1999 final loss to Meath. Ray Carey was declared unfit on matchday and was replaced with Kieran O'Connor.

Kerry's Colm Cooper was originally described as "very doubtful" for the final. However, he, alongside Paul Galvin, were later declared fit, with Kerry officials dismissing claims about Cooper's fitness as one of several "false stories" to have come out of the county in 2009. Kieran Donaghy, who had recovered from a foot injury, was expected to appear amongst the substitutes. Donaghy criticised the media for what he termed the "pandemonium" that was created surrounding Cooper throughout the campaign following a drinking session with Tomás Ó Sé which saw them both removed from the team for a time. Tadhg Kennelly also had to deny he would rejoin the Sydney Swans in the AFL. Kerry made one change from the semi-final line-up; Donnacha Walsh was replaced by Tommy Walsh. Prior to the match, speculation surrounded Kennelly and Walsh over whether they would return to play in Australia if they won their first All-Ireland medals. Kennelly later signed a two-year contract with Sydney Swans, as did Walsh; who signed a two-year deal with St Kilda Football Club around 2 months after the All-Ireland SFC final

=== Referee controversy ===
Marty Duffy of Sligo was appointed match referee for the final. The decision led to comment from former managers of both counties involved in the final, Mick O'Dwyer who expressed his belief that the choice of referee was based on "politics" and Billy Morgan who thought that Pat McEnaney ought to have been appointed referee instead. The GAA officially refused to offer a response to the two men. Liam and Sam in the Irish Independent compared the "pre-emptive" criticism of the referee to a scenario where the referee were to question the manner in which one of the teams play the sport or express dismay that a better team should have qualified for the final instead. Radio Kerry analyst and former referee Weeshie Fogarty expressed his dismay at the criticism of Duffy, commenting: "It's bad enough to referee big games in Croke Park and see your name being castigated in the papers and torn asunder the following week. But by God, when it happens before the game, that is a new trend to me".

== Match ==
=== Summary ===
==== First half ====
In the first minute, Kerry's Tadhg Kennelly struck the chin of Cork's Nicholas Murphy with his shoulder, escaping a caution in the process. Kennelly later admitted the challenge was premeditated, comparing himself to a "raging bull" in his autobiography. One minute later Cork's Donnacha O'Connor scored the first point of the final. Kennelly opened Kerry's account with a score from forty yards in the third minute. The seventh and ninth minutes respectively saw points from Cork's Colm O'Neill and Paddy Kelly. A goal for Cork came in the tenth minute from Colm O'Neill, with Kerry's Colm Cooper responding two and three minutes later by winning two frees and scoring two points. Cork achieved a four-point lead 30 yards out. O'Connor sets up and makes it two from two for O'Connor to give Cork a four-point lead in the sixteenth minute when Donnacha O'Connor scored a free from 30 yards but Kerry's Tommy Walsh responded by scoring two further points three and four minutes later. Colm Cooper scored from another free in the twenty-third minute, with Kennelly and Paul Galvin both missing two chances to score soon after. Declan O'Sullivan, Cooper and Kennelly soon followed with three points. Cork responded with a point from Daniel Goulding but Kerry's Tomás Ó Sé scored another. The final actions of the first half were frees scored by Cooper and Goulding for Kerry and Cork respectively.

==== Second half ====
Kerry's Colm Cooper scored the opening point of the second half, with Cork's response consisting of several wides. Kerry captain Darren O'Sullivan then scored a dubious point which should not have been given as he bounced the ball twice before scoring. Kerry goalkeeper Diarmuid Murphy then preserved his team's four-point lead in the forty-seventh minute by saving Daniel Goulding's effort on goal. Donnacha O'Connor scored a free two minutes later to give Cork their first point for some time. Tadhg Kennelly was substituted for Donnacha Walsh. Goulding scored two more frees for Cork but Tommy Walsh followed up by scoring two frees for Kerry. Tomás Ó Sé scored what proved to be the final point of the match in the fifty-eighth minute. The remainder of the match consisted of wides and substitutes.

== Details ==
20 September 2009
15:30 UTC+1

Cork	1–9 – 0–16	Kerry
D Goulding 0–4; C O'Neill 1–1; D O'Connor 0–3; P Kelly 0–1	Report	C Cooper 0–6; T Walsh 0–4; T Ó Sé 0–2; T Kennelly 0–2; Declan O'Sullivan 0–1; Darran O'Sullivan 0–1

Croke Park, Dublin
Attendance: 82,286
Referee: Marty Duffy (Sligo)

Cork	Kerry

Kerry =

- 1 D. Murphy
- 2 M. Ó Sé
- 3 T. Griffin
- 4 T. O'Sullivan
- 5 T. Ó Sé
- 6 M. McCarthy
- 7 K. Young
- 8 D. Ó Sé
- 9 S. Scanlon
- 10 P. Galvin
- 11 Declan O'Sullivan
- 12 T. Kennelly
- 13 C. Cooper
- 14 T. Walsh
- 15 Darran O'Sullivan (c)

Subs used
18 D. Walsh for T. Kennelly
27 K. Donaghy for Darran O'Sullivan
20 M. Quirke for D. Ó Sé
23 D. Moran for T. Walsh
17 A. O'Mahony for K. Young

Subs not used
16 G. Reidy
19 B. Sheehan
21 P. O'Connor
22 P. Reidy
24 A. Maher
25 S. O'Sullivan
26 D. Bohan
28 A. O'Shea
29 M. Corridan
30 B.J. Walsh

Manager
J. O'Connor

Cork =

- 1 A. Quirke
- 17 K. O'Connor
- 3 M. Shields
- 4 A. Lynch
- 5 J. Miskella
- 6 G. Canty (c)
- 7 N. O'Leary
- 8 A. O'Connor
- 9 N. Murphy
- 10 P. Kerrigan
- 11 P. O'Neill
- 12 P. Kelly
- 13 D. Goulding
- 14 C. O'Neill
- 15 D. O'Connor

Subs used
20 E. Cadogan for K. O'Connor
#? F. Goold for P. Kerrigan
24 D. Kavanagh for A. Lynch
#? J. Masters for D. Goulding
27 M. Cussen for A. O'Connor

Subs not used
2 R. Carey
#? K. Murphy
#? P. Kissane
#? G. Spillane
#? F. Lynch
#? J. Hayes
#? P. O'Flynn
#? C. McCarthy
#? B. O'Regan
#? A. Walsh

Manager
C. Counihan

== Post-match ==
=== Trophy presentation ===
Following a pitch invasion by fans after the 2009 All-Ireland Senior Hurling Championship final, the GAA confirmed that the presentation of the Sam Maguire Cup would take place in Croke Park's Hogan Stand. The GAA insisted that it still remained worried about the health and safety of fans and that it expected an accident to happen "one of these days". Kerry captain Darren O'Sullivan expressed his indifference about the location: "If they give [the cup] out in the car park around the back, I just want to get my hands on it". During the presentation, Tadhg Kennelly did his dance which he previously did when he won the AFL Grand Final with the Sydney Swans in 2005.

=== Reaction ===
Jack O'Connor claimed his team were influenced by the criticism which had come their way—"We were being written off – fellas like Spillane now were almost feeling pity for us. But that is where you get the energy from; you get it from enjoying each other's company and trying to build it up".

Conor Counihan claimed his team lost because of missed opportunities to score—"'We were definitely at a stage out there where we had opportunities and had we taken them, well it might have been an entirely different story. There's no doubt we could have put more pressure on Kerry at a couple of crucial periods. We didn't take our chances, however, and that's what it all boils down to".

Tadhg Kennelly confirmed that he was committed to the Kerry team and would not be returning to Sydney Swans for the following season—"My head is truly, truly set on Kerry. And my heart. That’s probably the main thing that has come out here".

Seán Moran in The Irish Times commended Kerry for how they "rattled off" another title, noting the achievement was "all the more admirable for the quality of opposition with which they have had to contend" and that Jack O'Connor, on his decision to return as manager, was "rewarded with the ultimate vindication".

=== Homecoming ===
One of the largest crowds to ever attend an All-Ireland homecoming collected in Rathmore, County Kerry on 21 September 2009 to wait for the team train to arrive. With "The Best" playing in the background, Aidan O'Mahony and Tom O'Sullivan carried the Sam Maguire Cup to a stage which was erected in the town's train station and Tadhg Kennelly danced yet another jig of celebration as children queued to receive autographs. Touring the county, a fireworks display was on offer in honour of the team in Killarney and the streets of Tralee were tightly packed with wellwishers.

Cork departed Dublin at 16:00 on 21 September 2009 en route to Cork's Kent Station via Mallow. Hundreds of people gathered at South Mall near Parnell Place to welcome the team, amongst them the Irish Minister for Foreign Affairs Micheál Martin and John Buckley, Bishop of Cork and Ross.

=== Awards ===
The nominations for the 2009 GAA All Stars Awards were announced on 25 September 2009. All but three of Kerry's winning team were nominated, with ten of Cork's team also being nominated. Kerry's Tomas Ó Sé, Declan O'Sullivan and Colm Cooper were also nominated in 2008. The nominees for Footballer of the Year were Paul Galvin and Tomás Ó Sé of Kerry and Graham Canty of Cork. Cork's Colm O'Neill was nominated for Young Footballer of the Year, alongside Mayo's Aidan O'Shea and eventual winner Donegal's Michael Murphy.
