= Kieran O'Connor =

Gaelic football player (1979–2020)

Personal information
- Native name: Ciarán Ó Conchubhair (Irish)
- Born: 31 May 1979 Aghada, County Cork, Ireland
- Died: 15 July 2020 (aged 41) Bishopstown, Cork, Ireland
- Occupation: Gaelic footballer
- Height: 5 ft 10 in (178 cm)

Sport
- Sport: Gaelic football
- Position: Left corner-back
Club
- Years: Club
- 1997–2016: Aghada
Club titles
- Cork titles: 0
Inter-county
| Years | County | Apps (scores) |
| 2004–2011 | Cork | 25 (0–02) |
Inter-county titles
- Munster titles: 3
- All-Irelands: 1
- NFL: 1
- All Stars: 0

Kieran O'Connor (31 May 1979 – 15 July 2020) was an Irish Gaelic footballer. At club level he played with Aghada and was an All-Ireland Championship-winner as a member of the extended panel with the Cork senior football team in 2010.

After beginning his career at club level with Aghada, O'Connor joined the Cork under-21 team as a 19-year-old in 1999. He was promoted to the Cork senior team under Billy Morgan in 2004. From his debut, O'Connor became a regular in defence and made a total of 25 championship appearances in a career that ended with him leaving the panel in March 2011. During that time he was a panellist when Cork won the All-Ireland Championship in 2010. O'Connor also secured three Munster Championship medals on the field of play and back-to-back National Football League medals in two separate divisions.

== Playing career ==
=== Agahda ===
O'Connor joined the Aghada club at a young age and played in all grade at juvenile and underage levels as a dual player. He made his first appearance for the Aghada senior football team on 18 May 1997 when he lined out at right corner-back in a 5–05 to 4–07 defeat by Mallow in the 1997 Cork County Championship. O'Connor also hurled with the Aghada intermediate team, and lined out in defence when the club lost the 2005 PIHC final to Ballinhassig.

=== Cork ===
==== Under-21 ====
O'Connor first played for Cork as a 19-year-old when he was drafted onto the under-21 team for the 1999 Munster Under-21 Championship. He made his debut on 31 March 1999 when he lined out at left corner-back in a 4–12 to 1–07 defeat of Tipperary. He was again named in the same position for Cork's subsequent defeat by Kerry in the Munster final. O'Connor was again eligible for the under-21 team the following year, but ended his underage inter-county county career without silverware.

==== Senior ====
O'Connor joined the Cork senior team under Billy Morgan, and made his first appearance on 17 July 2004 when he came on as a 60th-minute substitute for Owen Sexton in an 0–18 to 0–11 defeat by Fermanagh in the All-Ireland Qualifiers. He was again included on the panel for the following season and was introduced as a substitute in all but one of Cork's championship games, including the 1–11 to 0–11 Munster final defeat by Kerry.

He broke onto the starting fifteen during the 2006 Munster Championship and claimed his first Munster Championship medal that season after lining out at left corner-back in Cork's 1–12 to 0–09 victory over Kerry in a final replay. Following a two-point defeat by Kerry in his third successive Munster final appearance in 2007, O'Connor was again selected at left corner-back when Cork faced Kerry in the 2007 All-Ireland final. Marking Colm Cooper, he ended the game on the losing side after a 3–13 to 1–09 defeat.

After starting Cork's opening game of 2008 Munster Championship on the bench, O'Connor was reinstated to left corner-back for the final and claimed a second winners' medal after the 1–16 to 1–11 victory over Kerry. After claiming the Division 2 title of the 2009 National League after a defeat of Monaghan in the final, he later won a third Munster Championship medal in five seasons after Cork's 2–06 to 0–11 win over Limerick. Cork subsequently qualified for an All-Ireland final-meeting with Kerry, with O'Connor named on the bench. He was a late addition to the match-day starting fifteen as a replacement for Ray Carey, in a match which Cork lost by 0–16 to 1–09.

O'Connor was an unused substitute when Cork defeated Mayo to claim the Division 1 title of the 2010 National League and later remained as a panelist rather than a member of the starting fifteen during Cork's championship campaign. On 19 September 2010, he claimed a winners' medal as an unused substitute when Cork defeated Down by 0–16 to 0–15 in the All-Ireland final.

He rejoined the Cork senior team at the start of the 2011 season, however, injury curtailed his game time. On 28 March 2011, it was reported that he had opted out of the panel, effectively retiring from the inter-county game.

=== Munster ===
O'Connor was first selected for the Munster inter-provincial team in advance of the 2005 Railway Cup. It was the first of three successive seasons with the team, with defeat at the semi-final stage in the first two seasons. O'Connor lined out at left corner-back when Munster suffered a 1–12 to 1–08 defeat by Ulster in the 2007 Railway Cup final.

== Illness and death ==
One of the 100 percenters in our group was Kieran O'Connor from Aghada. A man who lived those two values [hard work and honesty] throughout his life, not just when he came into the Cork dressing room. He worked hard, was honest to a fault and would do anything for the group over the course of eight years.

Kieran is a man you would pick to go to war with you.

— All-Ireland-winning captain and teammate Graham Canty speaking of O'Connor in the Irish Examiner.

O'Connor was first struck with illness when a rare type of bone cancer called Ewing's sarcoma was discovered in October 2017. The diagnosis stemmed from a throbbing pain in his right ankle, which he mistook as the long-term effects of his football career. Four months of aggressive chemotherapy followed in an effort to shrink the tumour enough so that surgeons could proceed with an operation in February 2018. Intensive chemotherapy resumed after a month and went on until the end of July 2018.

O'Connor had planned on returning to work in December 2018; however, he was suffering from persistent pains in his leg and the wound was not healing fully. In January 2019 he had another serious operation and his lower leg was amputated. While trying to recover from the amputation, he started experiencing bad back pains, only later to find out that his cancer had spread and further chemotherapy was required. A GoFundMe page, set up by Friends of Kieran, raised over €270,000 in just four days after being set up in March 2019, while the wider GAA community also contributed funds through challenge matches, bucket collections and other sponsored activities.

On 15 July 2020, O'Connor died at age 41. Survived by his wife and three children, he was the first member of Cork's 2010 All-Ireland Championship-winning team to die.

There were numerous tributes from O'Connor's former teammates, including Conor Counihan and Eoin Cadogan, the Cork County Board and the GAA president John Horan, as well as people from the world of politics and other sports, such as Davy Russell.

== Honours ==
Cork

- All-Ireland Senior Football Championship (1): 2010
- Munster Senior Football Championship (3): 2006, 2008, 2009
- National Football League Division 1 (1): 2010
- National Football League Division 2 (1): 2009
