= Tommy Walsh (Kerry footballer) =

Kerry Gaelic footballer and Australian rules footballer

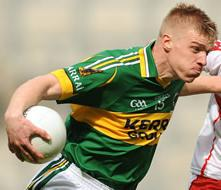

Personal information
- Native name: Tomás Breathnach (Irish)
- Born: 26 February 1988 (age 38) Tralee, Ireland
- Height: 1.98 m (6 ft 6 in)

Sport
- Sport: Gaelic football
- Position: Full Forward
Clubs
- Years: Club
- 2005–2024 2024: Kerins O'Rahilly's → St Brendan's (Divisional)
Club titles
- Munster titles: 1
Inter-county*
Years	County	Apps (scores)
2007–2009, 2015–2021	Kerry	15 (4–23)
Inter-county titles
- Munster titles: 3
- All-Irelands: 2
- NFL: 1
- All Stars: 1
- *Inter County team apps and scores correct as of match played 20 September 2009.

Tommy Walsh (born 26 February 1988) is an Irish former Gaelic football and Australian rules football player. The son of former Kerry Gaelic footballer Seán Walsh, he has played Gaelic football for the Kerins O'Rahilly's club and at senior level for the Kerry county team. Walsh played Australian rules football in the Australian Football League with St Kilda and Sydney.

== Gaelic football ==
=== Minor and under-21 ===
It was clear from an early stage that Walsh was a talented footballer. He was a star player for the Kerry team which reached the All-Ireland Minor Football Championship final in 2006. He made his debut for the Kerry seniors in the 2007 National Football League, coming on as a substitute wing-forward on 11 March against Limerick. Kerry went on to win the 2007 All-Ireland Senior Football Championship although Walsh did not appear in any championship game.

In 2008, Walsh won the All-Ireland Under-21 Football Championship with Kerry.

=== Kerry ===
Walsh was part of the Kerry panel who won the 2007 All-Ireland Senior Football Championship.

In 2008, Walsh was selected in the team for the first game of the All-Ireland Senior Football Championship following some impressive NFL performances in the full-forward line. Walsh made his championship debut came against Clare in the Munster Senior Football Championship, scoring a point. He did not start in the Munster final, which Kerry lost to Cork, but came on as a substitute for the last few minutes. He regained his place and a number of impressive performances saw him named as All Stars Young Footballer of the Year.

Later in the year, having resisted previous approaches from the Australian Football League, Walsh agreed to spend one week of preseason training with Australian Rules Football club, St Kilda. Players' agent Ricky Nixon described it as a 'big coup' for the AFL and said '"I can't tell you if he'll want to play or stay or if he'll be good enough but he's definitely one of the best talents that I've seen." However, Walsh later withdrew from the original trial and did not travel to Australia before the recruitment deadline, although he accepted an invitation to spend some time training with St Kilda.

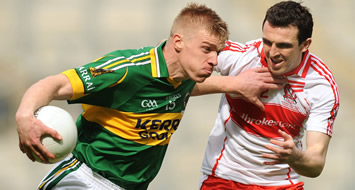
Walsh (left) in action against Derry's Kevin McGuckin in the 2009 National Football League

In 2009, Walsh suffered injury in the early part of the championship, which saw Cork knock Kerry out of the 2009 Munster SFC. Kerry came through the qualifiers to meet Dublin in the 2009 All-Ireland SFC quarter-final, but Walsh was not on top form and was replaced before half-time. He was dropped from the team but came on as a substitute during the second half of the semi-final, and a more impressive performance saw him regain his place for the final. In the 2009 All-Ireland SFC final, in which Kerry overcame Cork, Walsh notched up four points from play (two with each foot).

== Australian rules football ==
Tommy Walsh

Personal information
- Full name: Tommy Walsh
- Born: 26 February 1988 (age 38); Tralee, Ireland
- Original teams: Kerry (county team); Kerins O'Rahilly's (club)
- Height: 195 cm (6 ft 5 in)
- Weight: 97 kg (214 lb)
- Positions: Forward, Defender

Playing career^{1}
Years	Club	Games (Goals)
2012–2014	Sydney	5 (3)
- ^{1} Playing statistics correct to the end of 2014.

=== St Kilda ===
In October 2009, Walsh finally agreed to sign a two year AFL contract in 2009, with St Kilda general manager Matthew Drain saying that "he has enormous talent to become an important player for St Kilda".

In October 2010, Walsh returned to Ireland to line out for the Irish international rules team in the 2010 International Rules Series, held at the Gaelic Grounds in Limerick. Ireland lost the first test of 2010.

=== Sydney Swans ===
In October 2011, Walsh requested and received a trade to the Sydney Swans and was selected for Ireland for the 2011 International Rules Series against Australia.

Walsh was given the number 17 guernsey, vacated by the retirement of Tadhg Kennelly, who was a team-mate of Walsh's at Kerry in 2009. Walsh made his senior debut on Saturday 19 May 2012 against Melbourne, kicking two goals as the Swans won by 101 points.

In 2013, he tore three hamstring tendons from a bone.

At the conclusion of the 2014 AFL season, Walsh informed Sydney that he would return to Ireland.

== Return to the Kerry team ==
Kerry recalled Walsh for the 2015 National Football League. He played in six of Kerry's games in the Springs. He played his first Munster SFC game since the 2009 when he came on as a sub in the semi-final win over Tipperary. He later lined out in the All-Ireland quarter-final win over Kildare. He played in four of Kerry's 2016 National Football League fixtures, but left the panel before the start of the championship. Selector Mikey Sheehy later admitted this was a mistake, saying "we kind of threw him in at the deep end".

In September 2018, veteran Kerry forward Kieran Donaghy retired. The same week, Walsh scored 2–2 in a county championship meeting with Dr Crokes. In October 2018, Walsh told an interviewer: "I think it's unlikely that I'll play for Kerry again".

Peter Keane took over as Kerry manager in late 2018. He phoned Walsh. Walsh helped Kerry reach the 2019 All-Ireland SFC final. A substitute against Dublin, the drawn game was the first time in a decade that he played in the decider. Almost as soon as he came on, Walsh set up a vital Kerry goal for Killian Spillane.

Walsh retired from inter-county football in 2021 and from the game entirely in 2025.
