= Kilgass GAA =

Sligo-based Gaelic games club

Enniscrone/Kilglass
- Inis Crabhann/Cill Molaise
- Founded: 1888
- County: Sligo
- Colours: Yellow and Black
- Grounds: Quigabar

Playing kits
Standard colours

Senior Club Championships
	All Ireland	Connacht champions	Sligo champions
Football:	-	-	3

Enniscrone/Kilglass is a Gaelic Athletic Association club based in the barony of Tireragh in West Sligo, comprising the parish of Kilglass in County Sligo, Ireland.

Marty Duffy, who refereed the 2009 All-Ireland Senior Football Championship Final, is from the club, as is his brother Michael, who also refereed at national level.

== Honours ==
- Sligo Senior Football Championship: (3)
  - 1914, 1916 (Kilglass - 1929)
- Sligo Intermediate Football Championship: (1)
  - 1991
- Sligo Junior Football Championship: (2)
  - 1948, 1966
- Sligo Under 20 Football Championship: (1)
  - 1990
- Sligo Minor Football Championship: (3)
  - 1950, 1975, 2016 (amalgamated with Easkey in 2016)
- Sligo Intermediate Football League Division 3 (ex Div. 2): (5)
  - 1986, 1988, 1996, 2004, 2017
- Benson Cup: (1)
  - 2004
- Abbott Cup (1)
  - 2014
