= Paul Galvin (Gaelic footballer) =

Kerry Gaelic footballer (born 1979)

Personal information
- Native name: Pól Ó Galbháin (Irish)
- Born: 2 November 1979 (age 46) Lixnaw, County Kerry, Ireland
- Height: 6 ft 0 in (183 cm)

Sport
- Sport: Gaelic football, hurling
- Position: Right Half Forward
Clubs
- Years: Club
- 1998–2015 1998–2015 2016 2017 2018−: Finuge; Lixnaw; Kilmacud Crokes; St Oliver Plunketts/Eoghan Ruadh; Finuge
Club titles
	Football	Hurling
Kerry titles	2 (1 in Cork with UCC)	3
Munster titles	1	0
All-Ireland titles	0	0
Inter-county
Years	County	Apps (scores)
2003–2014, 2015 1999	Kerry (F); Kerry (H)	52 (1–49)
Inter-county titles
- Munster titles: 7
- All-Irelands: 4
- NFL: 3
- All Stars: 3

Paul Galvin (born 2 November 1979) is an Irish Gaelic footballer. He played with his local club Finuge, divisional side Feale Rangers and, between 2003 and 2014, the Kerry county team. Galvin had the honour of being named as the 1000th All Star Award. He also represented Ireland in the 2004 International Rules Series.

Galvin has written a weekly fashion column for the Irish Independent newspaper and presented a show on Radio Kerry.

He briefly managed the Wexford footballers but left the role amid the impact of the COVID-19 pandemic on Gaelic games.

== Playing career ==
=== Club ===
Born in Lixnaw, County Kerry, Galvin plays his club football with his local club Finuge and with his divisional side Feale Rangers. He also plays hurling with his local club Lixnaw.

In 2002 Galvin tasted victory for the first time as a footballer when Finuge qualified for the final of the county junior championship. The opponents on that occasion were Castlegregory. After two defeats at the same stage of the competition in 1998 and 2000, Galvin's side made no mistake at the third time of asking. A merited 0–12 to 1–6 victory gave Finuge the victory and gave Galvin a county junior winners' medal. Finuge subsequently represented Kerry in the provincial junior championship and even reached the final. Cork champions Kiskeam provided the opposition, however, the dream season continued for the Kerry men. Galvin added a Munster junior winners' medal to his collection following a 0–14 to 0–11 victory.

After surrendering their county title for a year, Finuge were back in the county junior final again in 2004. Lispole were the opponents this time around and a close game developed once again. Galvin's side nearly kicked the match away with an enormous wides tally, however, after a period of extra-time Finuge regained the title on a score line of 1–10 to 1–7. Another provincial decider beckoned for Galvin's side, with Cork champions Aghabullogue providing the opposition. The game was an exciting but one-sided affair, and Galvin picked up a second Munster junior winners' medal after a 2–13 to 3–4 victory. On this occasion the Kerry side went all the way to the All-Ireland final where Stewartstown Harps of Tyrone were waiting. Galvin gave an outstanding display in that game and the northerners were easily brushed aside on a score line of 1–14 to 0–6. This win gave Galvin an All-Ireland club winners' medal in the junior grade.

In 2007 Galvin lined out with divisional side Feale Rangers in the final of the county senior championship. A divisional side from the other half of the county, South Kerry provided the opposition. Furthermore, South Kerry were going for a remarkable fourth county title in succession. The game was an extremely close affair, however, Galvin's side pulled through to win by 1–5 to 0–6. With that he added a county senior winners' medal to his collection. It was Rangers' first county triumph in twenty-seven years.

Galvin is also a hurler of note and has enjoyed much success with Lixnaw. In 1999 he was a key member of the team that lined out against Crotta O'Neill's in the final of the county senior championship. After a 2–8 apiece draw, Lixnaw made no mistake in the replay and secured a narrow 0–9 to 1–5 victory. It was his first senior winners' medal in hurling.

After back-to-back county final defeats in 2002 and 2003, Lixnaw were back in 2005 and faced Abbeydorney. A third defeat in four years looked extremely likely, however, Galvin was the hero of the day. In the second minute of injury-time he sent over the equalising point and secured a 1–11 to 2–8 draw and a second chance in the replay. Lixnaw made no mistake on the second occasion and blew the opposition off the pitch. An enormous 0–17 to 0–6 victory gave Galvin a second county winners' medal.

After surrendering the hurling title the following year, Lixnaw were back to reclaim it in 2007. Kilmoyley provided the opposition in another final as Galvin's side went into the game as underdogs. The form book was torn up as Lixnaw powered to a 1–12 to 2–6 victory and a third county winners' medal for Galvin.

On 21 January 2011, media reports suggested that Galvin was poised for a club transfer from Finuge to St Vincent's in Dublin, but his club team-mate and former member of the Kerry management team, Éamonn Fitzmaurice, rubbished those reports via Twitter.

=== Minor and under-21 ===
Galvin first came to prominence on the inter-county scene as a member of the Kerry minor football team in the late 1990s. He lined out in his only provincial decider in that grade in 1997 with Limerick providing the opposition. The game was a huge triumph for 'the Kingdom' as Galvin's side won by 4–12 to 1–7. It was his first Munster winners' medal at minor level. Kerry were later defeated in the subsequent All-Ireland semi-final. The same year he won an All-Ireland Vocational Schools Championship with the Kerry Vocational Schools team following victory over Tyrone in the final.

Galvin's performances at minor level made him an automatic choice for the Kerry under-21 team in 1999. The provincial decider that year pitted Kerry against archrivals Cork. A close game developed, however, after the sixty minutes Kerry were the champions by 1–10 to 0–7. It was Galvin's only Munster under-21 winners' medal. An All-Ireland final appearance followed for Galvin, with Westmeath providing the opposition. Kerry were the favourites going into the game, however, the Leinster minnows proved that they were no pushovers. A narrow 0–12 to 0–9 score line resulted in defeat for Galvin's side.

Galvin continued to play for the Kerry under-21 team for another two seasons, however, he enjoyed little further success.

=== Senior ===
Galvin first played at intercounty senior level for Kerry not with the footballers but the hurlers in the late 90s. He made a number of appearances with the team during the NHL during this time.

Galvin joined the Kerry senior football team in the early 2000s, however, he had to wait for a number of years before establishing himself on the starting fifteen. In 2003 he renewed his rivalry with Limerick when he came on as a substitute in the provincial decider. A 1–11 to 0–9 victory gave Galvin a first Munster winners' medal in the senior grade. After an exciting game with Roscommon, Kerry advanced to an All-Ireland semi-final meeting with Tyrone. After being shocked in the latter stages of the two previous championships, Kerry were out to atone and were favourites going into the match. The whole team struggled and Kerry looked like they were going to be left behind with the new "blanket defence" that was introduced by teams like Armagh and perfected by Tyrone. Many criticised this tactic as a means of stopping talented footballers like Ó Sé and Colm Cooper from playing but few could deny its effectiveness. A humiliating 0–13 to 0–6 defeat saw Tyrone advance to the All-Ireland final while Kerry were unceremoniously dumped out of the championship.

2004 saw Galvin become an integral part of the Kerry team. The year began well with Kerry reaching the final of the National League. An exciting 3–11 to 1–6 victory saw Kerry claim the title and Galvin picked up a first National Football League winners' medal. Kerry later booked their almost annual spot in the provincial final and, for the second year in succession, Limerick were the opponents. Surprisingly, that game ended in a 1–10 apiece draw. The replay was also a close-run affair; however, Kerry never really looked in danger of losing. A 3–10 to 2–9 victory gave Galvin a second Munster winners' medal. The All-Ireland series proved no difficulty for Kerry, and 'the Kingdom' booked their place in the All-Ireland final against Mayo. An early goal from Alan Dillon gave the Connacht men some hope, however, the game was effectively over after twenty-five minutes when Colm Cooper scored Kerry's only goal of the day. The points kept coming from Galvin's team and an injury-time Michael Conroy goal was nothing but a consolation for Mayo. A 1–20 to 2–9 victory gave Galvin an All-Ireland winners' medal. Galvin was later presented with his first All-Star, the 1000th award since the scheme began in 1971.

In 2005 Kerry were hot favourites to retain their All-Ireland title. All was going to plan as Galvin's side reached yet another provincial final. In a return to tradition, Cork were the opponents. A close game developed, however, in the end Kerry were the narrow winners by 1–11 to 0–11. It was Galvin's third consecutive Munster winners' medal. Following this win Kerry cruised through the All-Ireland series to reach another championship decider with Tyrone providing the opposition. In one of the great finals of the decade, the result remained in doubt until the final whistle. Dara Ó Cinnéide powered Kerry ahead with a goal after just six minutes. Tyrone responded in kind with a Peter Canavan goal just before half-time. Tomás Ó Sé launched the Kerry comeback in the 57th minute with Kerry's second goal; however, it was too later. Tyrone hung on to win by 1–16 to 2–10. It was Galvin's first defeat in an All-Ireland final.

In 2006 Kerry reached the final of the National League and played Galway. Galvin's side could only manage three points in the opening half, however, the introduction of Eoin Brosnan transformed the team. At the end of the seventy minutes a 2–12 to 0–10 score line gave Kerry their 18th National League title and a second for Galvin. The league win was a false dawn as Kerry went out tamely to Cork in a replay of the Munster final. The team, however, bounced back against Longford to set up a meeting with Armagh in the All-Ireland quarter-final. At half-time it looked as though the Ulser hoodoo would strike again but Kerry blitzed the men from the orchard county in the second half and won by a score of 3–15 to 1–13. The game was not without incident as Galvin was red-carded for an altercation with the Armagh water carrier. Kerry again beat Cork in the subsequent semi-final before lining out against Mayo in the All-Ireland final. An unbelievable opening first-half saw Kerry go 2–4 to no score ahead after just ten minutes, courtesy of goals by Declan O'Sullivan and Kieran Donaghy. Colm Cooper slotted a third Kerry goal, however, Mayo settled and reduced the deficit to 3–8 to 3–2 at half-time. The second thirty-five minutes saw Kerry run riot while the westerners could only muster three points. A final score of 4–15 to 3–5 gave Kerry another All-Ireland title and gave Galvin a second All-Ireland winners' medal. Galvin finished off the year with a second All-Star award.

2007 saw Kerry face Cork in the provincial decider once again. A close game developed, however, at the full-time whistle Kerry were the champions by 1–15 to 1–13. It was Ó Galvin's fourth Munster winners' medal. Kerry then had the narrowest of victories in their All-Ireland quarter-final against Monaghan, setting up a glamour All-Ireland semi-final tie with Dublin. Kerry saw off a great Dublin comeback in the second half to win by two points. The subsequent All-Ireland final was an historic occasion as Kerry faced Cork in the very first all-Munster championship decider. While the first half was played on an even keel, 'the Kingdom' ran riot in the second half and a rout ensued. Cork goalkeeper Alan Quirke came in for much criticism after conceding some easy goals. At the full-time whistle Cork were trounced by 3–13 to 1–9. It was a third All-Ireland medal for Galvin and the first completion of back-to-back All-Ireland titles since Cork in 1989 and 1990.

In 2008 Galvin was appointed captain of the Kerry team. It was a great honour. What should have been a dream season for the Finuge man, particularly since Kerry were attempting to capture a first three-in-a-row of All-Ireland titles since 1986, 'the Kingdom's' championship opener against Clare was a dark moment for Galvin. The game was a largely low-key affair except for one controversial incident between referee Paddy Russell and Galvin. Russell was attempting to book the team captain when he slapped the notebook out of Russell's hand. Galvin then remonstrated with the linesman who had recommended his second yellow card. The incident has been described as due to the "frustration" he felt at being booked "for highlighting to the linesman the blatant and protracted pulling and dragging he was subjected to off the ball by his Clare marker". Galvin received a six-month suspension, however, this was later reduced to twelve weeks. It looked at this stage that Galvin's dream season was in tatters. Kerry drove on without him and reached the All-Ireland final for a fifth successive year. Conveniently, Galvin's suspension ended on the day of the championship decider against Tyrone. While he did not start the game he came on as a substitute. An exciting game developed, one that was more competitive than the routs that had taken place at the same stage of the championship over the previous two years. The sides were level seven times before Colm Cooper nudged Kerry 0–8 to 0–7 ahead before the interval. Tyrone simply wore Kerry into the ground in the second half as a priceless goal from Tommy McGuigan and a string of late points inspired Tyrone to their third All-Ireland title of the decade.

2009 saw Galvin return to the half-forward line for Kerry's opening Munster semi-final meeting with Cork. That game ended in a draw, however, Kerry were well beaten in the replay. 'The Kingdom' were subsequently banished to the qualifiers where they had some unimpressive wins over Longford, Sligo and Antrim. Galvin and his squad later lined out in the All-Ireland quarter-final and thrashed Dublin before overcoming Meath in a disappointing semi-final. For the second year in-a-row Kerry faced Cork in the All-Ireland final. Surprisingly, the men from 'the Kingdom' went into the game as slight underdogs. This tag appeared to be justified when Galvin's side trailed by 1–3 to 0–1 early in the opening half. The Kerry team stuck to their gameplan while Cork recorded fourteen wides, and at the final whistle Kerry were the champions again by 0–16 to 1–9. It was Galvin's fourth All-Ireland medal. He subsequently won an All-Star and the Footballer of the Year award.

In June 2010, Galvin was given an eight-week ban after the 2010 Munster Senior Football Championship semi-final replay win over Cork. The GAA's Central Competitions Control Committee proposed the suspension after reviewing video evidence of Galvin putting his finger into Eoin Cadogan's mouth.

On 1 February 2014, Galvin unexpectedly announced his retirement from inter county football in the aftermath of Kerry's opening round game of the 2014 National Football League. Kerry had lost by one point to Dublin in a game in which Galvin had not been involved.

On 3 March 2015, Galvin returned to the Kerry senior football panel.

=== College ===
Galvin played with UCC with whom he won Cork Senior Football Championship and Munster Senior Club Football Championship medals in 1999. He also played in the Sigerson Cup.

=== International rules ===
Galvin represented Ireland in the International Rules Series in 2004.

=== Province ===
Galvin has played for Munster in the Railway Cup.

=== School ===
Galvin won an All-Ireland Vocational Schools Championship with the Kerry Vocational Schools team in 1997.

=== Association football ===
Galvin has in the past trained with Cork City of Munster and Sunderland of Tyne and Wear.

== Managerial career ==
On 2 August 2019, Wexford GAA announced Galvin as its senior football manager on a two-year term, succeeding Paul McLoughlin.

He left the role abruptly in September 2020 amid the impact of the COVID-19 pandemic on Gaelic games, with the 2020 National Football League having been suspended since mid-March, meaning he did not manage for a full league campaign and for no championship game. Shane Roche, a member of Galvin's backroom team, replaced him.

== Honours ==
Inter-county
Football

- Munster Senior Football Championship (7) 2003, 2004, 2005, 2007, 2011, 2013, 2015
- All-Ireland Senior Football Championship (4) 2004, 2006, 2007, 2009
- National Football League Division 1 2004, 2006, 2009
- Munster Under-21 Football Championship (1) 1999, 2000
- Munster Minor Football Championship (1) 1997

Hurling

- All-Ireland Under-21 B Hurling Championship (1) 1998
- All-Ireland Minor B Hurling Championship (1) 1997

Club

- Cork Senior Football Championship (1)
- Munster Senior Club Football Championship (1) 1999
- Munster Intermediate Club Football Championship (1) 2012
- Kerry Senior Football Championship (1) 2007
- Kerry Intermediate Football Championship (1) 2012
- Kerry Junior Football Championship (2) 2002, 2004
- Munster Junior Club Football Championship (2) 2002, 2004
- All-Ireland Junior Club Football Championship 2005
- Kerry Senior Hurling Championship (3) 1999, 2005, 2007

== Personal life ==
Galvin was a secondary school teacher of Geography and Gaeilge in Coláiste Chríost Rí, Cork and St. Brendan's College, Killarney. He coached the senior school team to the All-Ireland in 2009.

In February 2012, he came third in a poll to find Ireland's most desirable Valentines.

In April 2013 it was reported he had been sued for €8,000 in damages for throwing a blackboard duster at one of his students.

Paul Galvin got engaged to Louise Duffy on a trip to New York in March 2014. They got married on New Year's Eve 2015.

== Controversy ==
In October 2011, Galvin allegedly assaulted the impressionist Oliver Callan and his producer James McDonald late at night in Kehoe's Pub, Central Dublin. Among witnesses to the alleged incident were a Government Minister, a TD, a senator and several journalists. One witness alleged Galvin called Callan a "Fucking Cunt". The incident was investigated by an Garda Síochána. The media speculated on the reason behind the alleged incident, reporting that Callan had recently mimicked Galvin asking Taoiseach Enda Kenny to man-up by giving him a body-wax on Green Tea and that Galvin had texted Callan before an appearance on The Saturday Night Show in relation to "gay jibes" the satirist had directed at him. It was eventually revealed that Galvin had complained (or not complained at all) to RTÉ after what he described as "the most excruciating night of my life" at home on his sofa between his parents in Kerry watching The Saturday Night Show when Callan referred to Galvin's "years spent in the closet".

On 6 December 2011, Galvin spoke of the encounter during an interview on The Ray D'Arcy Show on Today FM.

Sporting positions
Preceded by Declan O'Sullivan	Kerry Senior Football Captain; 2008	Succeeded by Tomás Ó Sé
Preceded by Tomás Ó Sé	Kerry Senior Football Captain; 2008	Succeeded by Darran O'Sullivan
Preceded by Sean Cavanagh (Tyrone)	All Stars Footballer of the Year; 2009	Succeeded by Bernard Brogan Jnr (Dublin)
