= Green Tea (radio show) =

Irish radio program

Green Tea is the title of a series of topical comedy pieces broadcast each weekend on RTÉ Radio 1, starring Oliver Callan.

It features President Michael D. Higgins shouting "Where's my box? Where’s my box?" before he goes to bed under his Seamus Heaney duvet, and unsuccessful presidential candidate David Norris as Higgins's vice-president. It also features Charlie Bird, Gerry Adams and Giovanni Trapattoni.

The Irish Times has described Green Tea as "essentially an extended version of Nob Nation", Callan's previous incarnation.

In October 2011, Callan was involved in a public altercation with Kerry GAA star and fashion columnist Paul Galvin, with media reporting that Callan had recently mimicked Galvin asking Taoiseach Enda Kenny to man-up by giving him a body-wax on Green Tea, and that Callan has also been making humorous references to his relationship with Gráinne Seoige. The altercation prompted an appearance by Callan on national television during which he came out as gay. Callan impersonated Galvin again on Green Tea the week after the incident.
