= Marty Duffy =

Irish Gaelic football referee

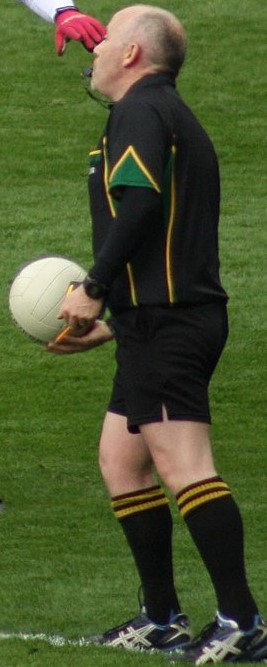
- Duffy during the 2013 National Football League final between Dublin and Tyrone at Croke Park

Personal information
- Native name: Máirtín Ó Dufaigh
- Full name: Martin Duffy
- Home town: Enniscrone
- Years active: Until 2017
- Employer: GAA

Sport
- Sport: Gaelic football
- Position: Referee

Martin Duffy is a Gaelic football referee from County Sligo. He is from Enniscrone.

He is a member of the Kilgass GAA club and has served as its chairperson. He is the brother of Michael Duffy, also a referee.

== Career ==
Duffy refereed the 2009 All-Ireland Senior Football Championship Final between Cork and Kerry at Croke Park. The decision to appoint Duffy surprised Mick O'Dwyer and Billy Morgan, who thought it would have gone to Pat McEnaney, comments which disappointed former referee Weeshie Fogarty.

Duffy had done some Sligo and Connacht finals and refereed both the 2009 National Football League opener between Dublin and Tyrone and the 2009 National Football League final between Derry and Kerry. He did provincial finals in Leinster and Munster too. He also refereed the 2013 National Football League final between Dublin and Tyrone.

He retired from inter-county refereeing at the end of 2017. He also retired from refereeing, with his last game being the 2017 Connacht Senior Club Football Championship final.

He was appointed chair of the Central Referees' Appointments Committee (CRAC) in 2021.

In March 2021, Duffy was appointed chairperson of the Gaelic Athletic Association's (GAA) Central Referees' Appointments Committee (CRAC), succeeding Michael Curley in the role. In this position, he took responsibility for overseeing the assignment and development of match officials for national-level fixtures, including the National Football League and the All-Ireland Senior Football Championship.
