= Tadhg Kennelly =

Irish-Australian sportsperson and coach (born 1981)

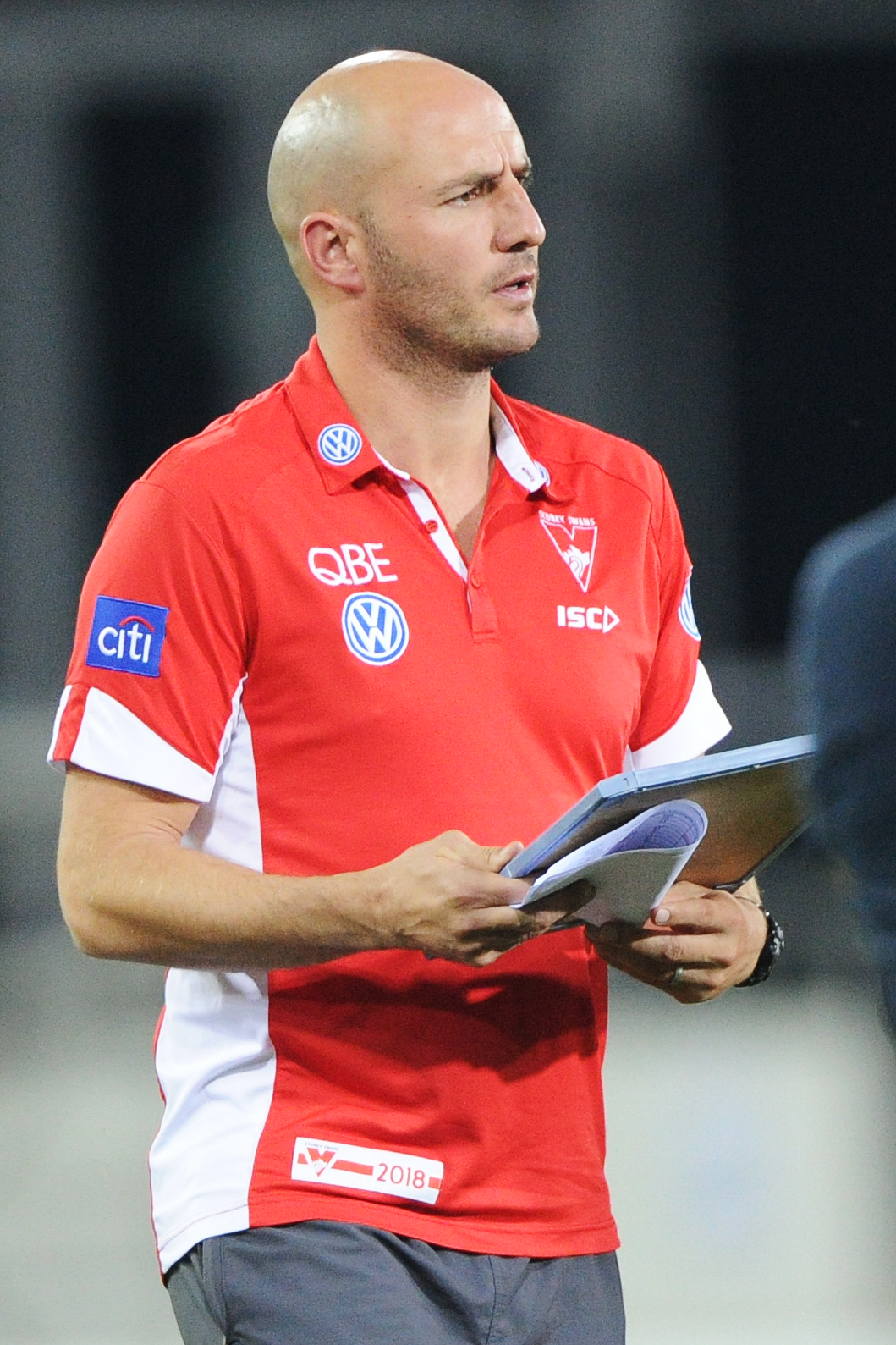
- Kennelly coaching in July 2018

Personal information
- Full name: Tadhg Kennelly
- Born: 1 July 1981 (age 45); Listowel, County Kerry, Ireland
- Original team: Listowel Emmets (club)/Kerry (underage, county team)
- Height: 190 cm (6 ft 3 in)
- Weight: 90 kg (198 lb)

Playing career^{1}
Years	Club	Games (Goals)
2001–08; 2010–11	Sydney	197 (30)

International team honours
Years	Team	Games (Goals)
2001–2011	Ireland	6
- ^{1} Playing statistics correct to the end of 2011.

Career highlights
- Sydney premiership player 2005; 2002 AFL Rising Star nominee Rd 19

Tadhg Kennelly (born 1 July 1981) is an Irish-Australian former international sportsperson turned recruiter and coach. He is most known for his top-level careers in both Gaelic football and Australian rules football being the first holder of both an AFL Premiership medallion and a Senior All-Ireland Championship medal, the highest-possible team-based achievement in both sports. He has also represented Ireland in the International Rules Series.

Kennelly grew up playing Gaelic football with Listowel Emmets in County Kerry, but he moved to Australia to play professional Australian rules football in the Australian Football League. He is best known in Australia as the first Irish-born player to have received an AFL Premiership medallion and the first AFL player to represent Ireland against Australia in the International Rules Series. After Jim Stynes, he is the third-most-experienced player associated with the Irish experiment.

Kennelly returned to his native Listowel to play in the 2009 All-Ireland Senior Football Championship (SFC). On 20 September 2009, he started the All-Ireland SFC Final as part of Kerry's All-Ireland winning side, scoring two points during the game and thus becoming the first person to win an AFL Premiership and an All-Ireland SFC. After achieving his dream, he returned to the AFL to play for Sydney after missing one season.

== Early life ==
Kennelly was born in Listowel in 1981 to mother Nuala and father Tim Kennelly, a former All-Ireland Senior Football Championship winner with the Kerry county team. His brother Noel Kennelly also played Gaelic football.

Tadhg grew up playing Gaelic football and was recognised as a highly talented underage player in Kerry GAA. He was scouted by a number of English soccer teams, including Tranmere Rovers and West Brom, and had underage trials for the Irish national team before being recruited by Blackburn Rovers. Within a few months, he decided to return to Ireland.

== Sporting career ==
=== Underage Gaelic football career ===
He first played with the Kerry minor team in 1997 when he won a Munster Minor Football Championship (MFC), overcoming Limerick. He was underage again in 1998 and won a second Munster MFC title after another win over Limerick. He missed out on three in a row in 1999, as Cork took the title.

While still a minor, he was part of the county's under-21 team. He won a Munster Under-21 Football Championship title after overcoming Cork in the final. A surprise loss in the All-Ireland Under-21 Football Championship final to Westmeath was his lot. He made a return to the under-21 team in 2002, lining out in the All-Ireland semi-final loss to Galway.

=== AFL career, 2001–2008 ===
In 1999, he signed a rookie contract with the Sydney Swans. After his debut in 2001 (following elevation from the rookie list), he became a permanent fixture in the Sydney line-up as a dashing rebound defender, wearing the number 17 guernsey.

Kennelly earned an AFL Rising Star nomination in Round 19 of 2002, consolidating his reputation as an upcoming young talent. He was second (behind Leo Barry) for rebounds (77) from the defensive 50-metre arc in 2004.

Kennelly became the first Irishman to win an AFL Premiership medal in 2005, after playing all 26 games for the Sydney Swans that year, including his 100th AFL game in the Preliminary Final against St Kilda. He was reportedly earning an annual salary of $750,000 (350,000 Euro) while playing for the Sydney Swans. The hype in Australia surrounding Kennelly's appearance in the AFL Grand Final was so much that Network Ten sent out its usual game-day boundary rider, Andrew Maher, over to County Kerry to visit Tadhg's family for the week and watch the Grand Final with them. Kennelly also appeared in the 2006 Grand Final, but the Swans lost 85–84 to the West Coast Eagles.

In 2007 and 2008, after several seasons missing only a handful of games, Kennelly suffered a series of serious leg and shoulder injuries which became major setbacks to his AFL career. His knee buckled from a heavy tackle from the Melbourne Demons' Byron Pickett, causing an anterior cruciate ligament tear and seeing him miss several matches, including later matches due to complications. In 2008, he again injured his knee, dislocating his knee cap and injuring his shoulder. He was selected in the Dream Team for the AFL Hall of Fame Tribute Match, but he later withdrew due to injury. He was quick to recover, however, and made an appearance for the Swans the following week, though again succumbed to the injury curse. During the rest of 2008, Kennelly's shoulder continually dislocated during games, and his unorthodox methods of popping it back in was the subject of much media interest.

On several occasions during his AFL career, Kennelly had expressed a desire to return home to Ireland and leave the AFL, as he wanted to emulate the success of his father and win an All-Ireland Senior Football Championship medal with his native county's team, Kerry. In December 2005, Kennelly's father Tim died suddenly at age 51. It is believed his father's death may have some bearing on Kennelly's wish to return to Ireland.

On 31 August 2006, Kennelly ended months of speculation by announcing he would be staying on with the Swans for a further three years. Kennelly said that this would be his last AFL contract and that he would be returning to Ireland at the end of the three-year contract. In March 2008, Kennelly was reported to have announced that he would "definitely" return to Ireland in 2009 to play with Kerry, saying "I want to win an All-Ireland with Kerry." Kennelly announced his return to Ireland and Gaelic football in January 2009.

=== Gaelic football career 2009 ===
Tadhg Kennelly
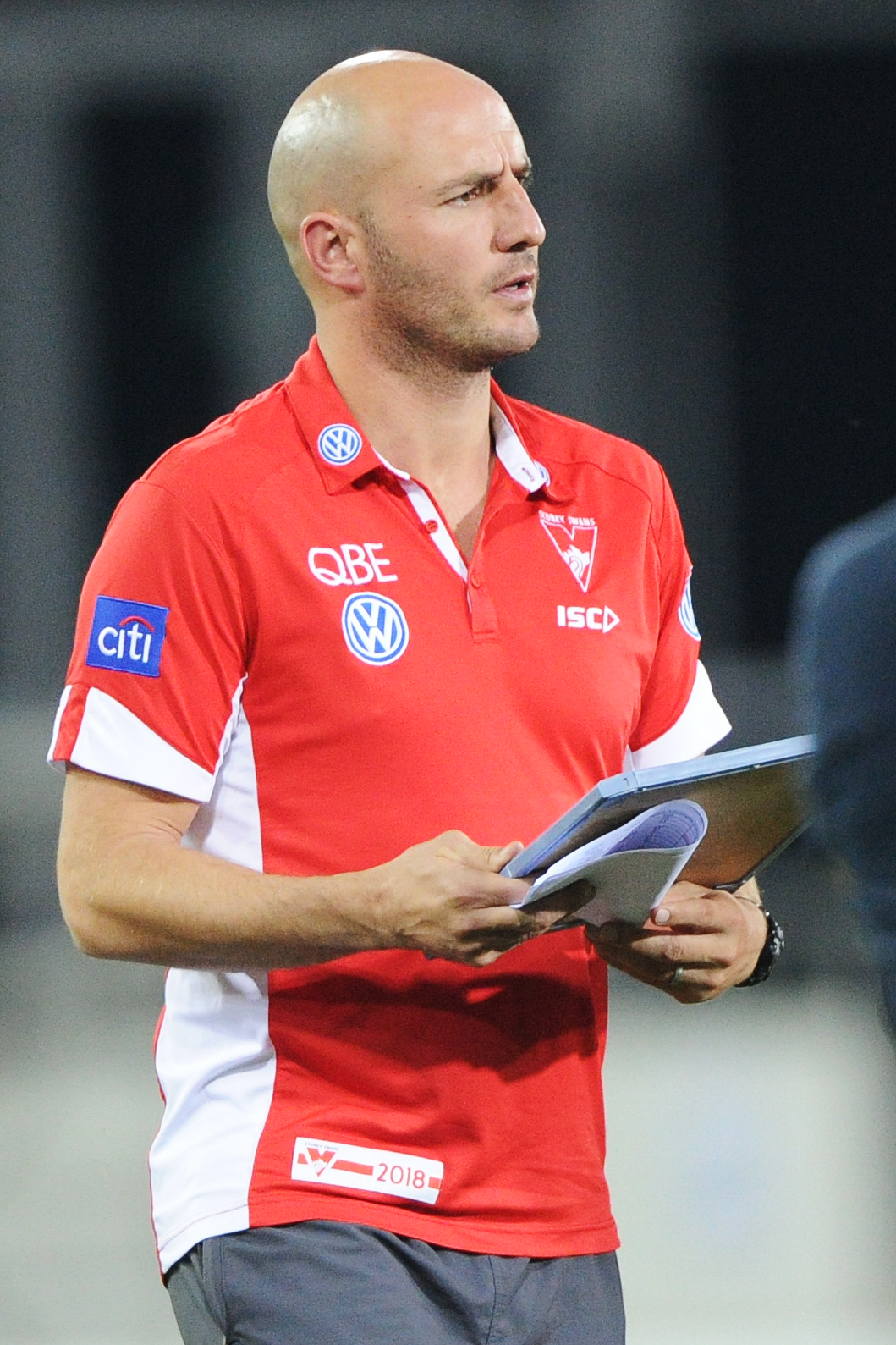

Personal information
- Native name: Tadhg Mac an Fhailí (Irish)
- Born: Listowel, County Kerry
- Height: 6 ft 3 in (191 cm)

Sport
- Sport: Gaelic football
- Position: Half Forward
Club
Years	Club	Apps (scores)
1998 - 2001; 2009	Listowel Emmets	66
Inter-county*
Years	County	Apps (scores)
2009	Kerry	6 (0–8)
Inter-county titles
- Munster titles: 0
- All-Irelands: 1 (2009)
- NFL: 1 (2009)
- All Stars: 1
- *Inter County team apps and scores correct as of November 2009.

Upon returning to Kerry, Kennelly was given a job as a coaching officer by the Kerry County Board.

He played his first senior competitive game for the Kerry county team on 8 March 2009 when he came on as a substitute in the Irish NFL against Derry, and there was speculation that he would be a member of the Kerry squad for the All-Ireland Senior Football Championship. He went on to win an Irish NFL medal when Kerry defeated Derry in the final at Croke Park. As Kerry had a number of injuries—meaning that Darragh Ó Sé, Anthony Maher, Séamus Scanlon and Kieran Donaghy were all short of full fitness—Kennelly played in Kerry's first two games of the All-Ireland Senior Football Championship (SFC) in June. He picked up an injury during the All-Ireland qualifier series, but his form continued to improve, and after an impressive appearance as a substitute in the All-Ireland SFC quarter-final against Dublin, he broke into the starting team for the semi-final in which Kerry defeated Meath. On 20 September 2009, he played the first fifty minutes of the All-Ireland SFC final win against Cork, scoring two points and becoming the first person to win an AFL premiership and an All-Ireland Senior Football Championship. After the final, Kennelly committed himself to the Kerry football team for the 2010 season, despite speculation that he would return to Australia.

In October 2009, he published his autobiography, Unfinished Business, ghost written with Scotty Gullen. The book was controversial; a paragraph claimed that he set out to make his mark at the start of the All-Ireland SFC Final by deliberately colliding with Nicholas Murphy. After a backlash, Kennelly released a statement in which he stated that his ghost writer had taken him out of context.

In November 2009, Kennelly informed the Kerry County Board of his intention to return to the AFL in 2010.

=== AFL career, 2009–2011 ===
On 12 November 2009, Kennelly signed a two-year deal with the Sydney Swans, marking his return to the AFL. In addition to his playing role, he took up a coaching role at the club. He was very consistent throughout the year, playing in his customary role off half-back. He was chosen in the Irish squad for the International Series in October.

Kennelly played his final AFL game in Sydney's semi-final defeat at the hands of Hawthorn on 16 September 2011; he played 197 AFL games.

== Statistics ==
Legend
G	Goals	K	Kicks	D	Disposals	T	Tackles
B	Behinds	H	Handballs	M	Marks

Season	Team	No.	Games	Totals							Averages (per game)						
Season	Team	No.	Games	G	B	K	H	D	M	T	G	B	K	H	D	M	T
2001	Sydney	41	8	3	1	36	13	49	11	5	0.4	0.1	4.5	1.6	6.1	1.4	0.6
2002	Sydney	17	20	7	3	127	100	227	46	26	0.4	0.2	6.4	5.0	11.4	2.3	1.3
2003	Sydney	17	24	8	2	206	164	370	85	38	0.3	0.1	8.6	6.8	15.4	3.5	1.6
2004	Sydney	17	23	7	2	192	153	345	83	37	0.3	0.1	8.3	6.7	15.0	3.6	1.6
2005	Sydney	17	26	2	5	250	146	396	99	50	0.1	0.2	9.6	5.6	15.2	3.8	1.9
2006	Sydney	17	22	1	2	211	149	360	88	42	0.0	0.1	9.6	6.8	16.4	4.0	1.9
2007	Sydney	17	13	1	0	129	89	218	67	25	0.1	0.0	9.9	6.8	16.8	5.2	1.9
2008	Sydney	17	22	0	4	235	175	410	78	36	0.0	0.2	10.7	8.0	18.6	3.5	1.6
2010	Sydney	17	20	0	1	261	152	413	99	19	0.0	0.1	13.1	7.6	20.7	5.0	1.0
2011	Sydney	17	19	1	1	170	125	295	46	49	0.1	0.1	8.9	6.6	15.5	2.4	2.6
Career			197	30	21	1817	1266	3083	702	327	0.2	0.1	9.2	6.4	15.6	3.6	1.7

== Post AFL ==
Post AFL Kennelly shifted into AFL recruitment and coaching.

In 2013, he was appointed by the Australian Football League as its International Talent Manager. As part of this role he oversaw the International AFL Combine and coordinated the first AFL Europe Combine held in Dublin in 2015.

In 2018, he returned to the Sydney Swans becoming a development coach.

In 2021, he founded a fitness class and discussion group aimed at offering peer support called "When No-One's Watching".

In October 2022 Kennelly was appointed Academy coach of the Swans cross town rivals Greater Western Sydney Giants.

== See also ==
- List of players who have converted from one football code to another
- Irish experiment (Australian rules football)
