= Paddy Kelly (Cork footballer) =

Irish Gaelic footballer

Personal information
- Native name: Pádraig Ó Ceallaigh (Irish)
- Born: 14 August 1985 (age 41) Cork, Ireland
- Occupation: Primary school teacher
- Height: 1.83 m (6 ft 0 in)

Sport
- Sport: Gaelic Football
- Position: Left wing-forward
Club
- Years: Club
- 2003-present: Ballincollig
Club titles
- Cork titles: 1
Inter-county*
Years	County	Apps (scores)
2008-2017	Cork	38 (0-26)
Inter-county titles
- Munster titles: 3
- All-Irelands: 1
- NFL: 3
- All Stars: 0
- *Inter County team apps and scores correct as of 20:52, 22 January 2017.

Patrick Kelly (born 14 August 1985) is an Irish Gaelic footballer. His league and championship career at senior level with the Cork county team spanned nine seasons from 2008 to 2016.

Born in Cork, Kelly first played competitive Gaelic football during his schooling at Coláiste Choilm. Here he had Moran Cup and Frewen Cup successes. Kelly first appeared for the Ballincollig club at underage levels, winning divisional minor and under-21 championship medals. As a member of the club's senior team he won a county senior championship medal in 2014.

Kelly made his debut on the inter-county scene at the age of seventeen when he was selected for the Cork minor team. He played for one championship season with the minor team, and was a Munster runner-up. Kelly subsequently joined the Cork under-21 team, winning three successive Munster medals between 2004 and 2006. He made his debut during the 2008 league. Over the course of the next nine years Kelly had several successes, culminating with the winning of an All-Ireland medal in 2010. He also won three Munster medals and three National Football League medals. He played his last game for Cork in July 2016 and announced his retirement in January 2017.

After being chosen on the Munster inter-provincial team for the first time in 2005, Kelly made a number of appearances over the following years. During that time he won one Railway Cup medal.

== Career statistics ==
Team	Season	National League			Munster		All-Ireland		Total	
Team	Season	Division	Apps	Score	Apps	Score	Apps	Score	Apps	Score
Cork	2008	Division 2	3	0-00	1	0-00	1	0-00	5	0-00
Cork	2009	Division 2	4	0-02	3	0-02	3	0-04	10	0-08
Cork	2010	Division 1	7	1-08	2	0-02	6	0-10	15	1-20
Cork	2011	Division 1	7	2-12	3	0-02	2	0-02	12	2-16
Cork	2012	Division 1	8	3-04	1	0-00	2	0-01	11	3-05
Cork	2013	Division 1	0	0-00	2	0-00	1	0-00	3	0-00
Cork	2014	Division 1	4	0-01	2	0-00	1	0-00	7	0-01
Cork	2015	Division 1	3	0-00	3	0-00	2	0-02	8	0-02
Cork	2016	Division 1	0	0-00	0	0-00	3	0-01	3	0-01
Total			36	6-27	17	0-06	21	0-20	74	6-53

== Honours ==
Ballincollig

- Cork Senior Football Championship (1): 2014

Cork

- All-Ireland Senior Football Championship (1): 2010
- Munster Senior Football Championship (3): 2008, 2009, 2012
- National Football League Division 1 (3): 2010, 2011, 2012
- National Football League Division 2 (1): 2009
- Munster Under-21 Football Championship (1): 2004, 2005, 2006

Munster

- Railway Cup (1): 2008
