= Darran O'Sullivan =

Kerry Gaelic footballer

Personal information
- Native name: Darran Ó Súilleabháin (Irish)
- Born: 3 May 1986 (age 40) London, England
- Occupation: Sky sports athlete mentor
- Height: 5 ft 9 in (175 cm)

Sport
- Sport: Gaelic football
- Position: Forward
Club
- Years: Club
- 2004–: Glenbeigh-Glencar
Club titles
- Kerry titles: 1
College
- Years: College
- DIT
College titles
- Sigerson titles: 1
Inter-county
| Years | County | Apps (scores) |
| 2005–2018 | Kerry | 97 (7–62) |
Inter-county titles
- Munster titles: 10
- All-Irelands: 4
- NFL: 3
- All Stars: 1

Darran O'Sullivan (born 3 May 1986 in London, England) is a Gaelic footballer. He plays Gaelic football with his local club Glenbeigh-Glencar, his divisional side Mid Kerry and at senior level for the Kerry county team from 2005 until 2018. O'Sullivan captained Kerry to the All-Ireland title in 2009.

== Playing career ==
=== Club ===
While still in London, O'Sullivan began his under-age football career with Tír Chonaill Gaels. After moving to Kerry in the late 1990s he immediately joined the local Glenbeigh-Glencar club, while he has also lined out with the Mid Kerry divisional side.

In 2004, he was the star player when Glenbeigh-Glencar defeated Churchill by 2–05 to 1–06 to take the county novice football championship.

With Mid-Kerry, O'Sullivan lined out in the final of the county senior championship in 2008. Kerins O'Rahilly's provided the opposition on that occasion, however, the game ended in a draw. The replay was also an exciting affair with Kerins O'Rahilly's heading for victory with the game entering the dying minutes. Mid Kerry launched one final attack that finished with Ian Twiss being upended in the O'Rahilly's square. The referee showed no hesitation pointing to the spot and up stepped Aidan O'Shea to guarantee himself hero status in Mid Kerry. After converting the penalty Mid Kerry took a 1–7 to 0–9 lead. With that the game was over and O'Sullivan collected his first county senior championship winners' medal. Because divisional sides are not allowed to take part in the provincial club championship, county runners-up Kerins O'Rahilly's represented the county in Munster.

=== College ===
==== Dublin Institute of Technology ====
In 2012, O'Sullivan went back to college to study Marketing in Dublin Institute of Technology. The Kerryman was included on the Sigerson team with many big names, including Mayo midfielder Aidan O'Shea. O'Sullivan played a key role in helping the college to their victory in the Sigerson Cup which was the college's first in the 101-year history of the competition. This historic success came on the back of a successful Div 1 league campaign which seen the college complete a historic league and championship double which hasn't been done at this level since 1978.

=== Inter-county ===
==== Minor ====
O'Sullivan won a Munster Minor Football Championship medal with Kerry 2004, and was a member of the Kerry minor side beaten by Laois in the 2003 All-Ireland Minor Football Championship semi-final and of the team which lost to Tyrone by 0-12 to 0-10 in the 2004 final. The 2004 final was notable as O'Sullivan was deliberately targeted by a Tyrone defence that had singled him out as Kerry's main threat.

==== Under 21 ====
He later became a member of the Kerry Under 21 team from 2005 to 2007 but had little success.

==== Junior ====
O'Sullivan was a member of the Kerry squad for the All-Ireland Junior Football Championship in 2005, starting in the forward line. Kerry defeated Tipperary GAA in the quarter-final of the Munster Junior Football Championship. They then overcame Limerick GAA in a replay to reach the final. However, Cork GAA, who subsequently won the All-Ireland championship, beat them in the final.

==== Senior ====
Later in 2005 O'Sullivan joined the Kerry senior football panel. The team entered the championship as the hot favourites to retain their All-Ireland title. All was going to plan as Kerry reached yet another provincial final. O'Sullivan remained on the bench for that game as his side defeated arch-rivals Cork by 1–11 to 0–11. Following this win Kerry cruised through the All-Ireland series to reach the championship decider against Tyrone. In one of the great finals of the decade, the result remained in doubt until the final whistle. Dara Ó Cinnéide powered his team ahead with a goal after just six minutes. Tyrone responded in kind with a Peter Canavan goal just before half-time. O'Sullivan entered the game as a substitute as Tomás Ó Sé launched the Kerry comeback in the 57th minute with Kerry's second goal; however, it was too late. Tyrone hung on to win by 1–16 to 2–10. It was O'Sullivan's first defeat in an All-Ireland final.

In 2006 Kerry reached the final of the National Football League and played Galway. O'Sullivan's side could only manage three points in the opening half, however, the introduction of Eoin Brosnan transformed the team. At the end of the seventy minutes a 2–12 to 0–10 score line gave Kerry their 18th National League title and a first for O'Sullivan. The league win was a false dawn as Kerry went out tamely to Cork in a replay of the Munster final. The team, however, bounced back against Longford to set up a meeting with Armagh in the All-Ireland quarter-final. At half-time it looked as though the Ulser hoodoo would strike again but Kerry blitzed the men from the orchard county in the second half with Darragh Ó Sé dominating midfield while Kieran Donaghy shone at full-forward. Darran was introduced to the action on 56 minutes. Kerry won an absorbing contest by a score of 3–15 to 1–13, with Darran scoring the third and decisive goal and in the process putting paid to the notion that Kerry had no answer to the northern style of defensive play. Kerry again beat Cork in the subsequent semi-final before lining out against Mayo in the All-Ireland final. An unbelievable opening first-half saw Kerry go 2–4 to no score ahead after just ten minutes, courtesy of goals by Declan O'Sullivan and Kieran Donaghy. Colm Cooper slotted a third Kerry goal, however, Mayo settled and reduced the deficit to 3–8 to 3–2 at half-time. The second thirty-five minutes saw Kerry run riot while the westerners could only muster three points. A final score of 4–15 to 3–5 gave Kerry another All-Ireland title and gave substitute O'Sullivan a first All-Ireland winners' medal.

In 2007 Kerry faced Cork in the provincial decider once again. A close game developed, however, at the full-time whistle Kerry were the champions by 1–15 to 1–13. O'Sullivan came on as a substitute to collect his second Munster winners' medal and his first on the field of play. Kerry then had the narrowest of victories in their All-Ireland quarter-final against Monaghan, setting up a glamour All-Ireland semi-final tie with Dublin. Kerry put an end to a Dublin comeback in that game and won by two points. The subsequent All-Ireland final was an historic occasion as Kerry faced Cork in the very first all-Munster championship decider. While the first half was played on an even keel, 'the Kingdom' ran riot in the second half and a rout ensued. Cork goalkeeper Alan Quirke came in for much criticism after conceding some easy goals. At the full-time whistle Cork were trounced by 3–13 to 1–9. Once again O'Sullivan didn't start the game but came on in the second half to collect his second consecutive All-Ireland winners' medal.

In 2008 Kerry were on course to secure their first three-in-a-row since 1986. All did not go to plan as O'Sullivan's side lost team captain Paul Galvin to suspension after an incident with referee Paddy Russell in the Munster semi-final against Clare. The subsequent Munster final saw Kerry take an eight-point lead over Cork at half-time. 'The Rebels' fought back and, in a massive downpour, Kerry could only muster three points in the second period of play as Cork secured a remarkable 1–16 to 1–11 victory. Kerry worked their way through to the All-Ireland semi-final where they faced Cork once again. After a thrilling draw and an exciting replay Kerry emerged victorious. An All-Ireland final appearance against Tyrone was the reward for this victory, with O'Sullivan starting on the bench again. An exciting game developed, one that was more competitive than the routs that had taken place at the same stage of the championship over the previous two years. The sides were level seven times before Colm Cooper nudged Kerry 0–8 to 0–7 ahead before the interval. Tyrone simply wore Kerry into the ground in the second half as a priceless goal from Tommy McGuigan and a string of late points inspired Tyrone to their third All-Ireland title of the decade.

In 2009 O'Sullivan was honored by being appointed captain of the Kerry senior football team after Mid Kerry winning the County Championship in 2008. The year began well with his side's National League victory over Derry to capture his third winners' medal in that competition. Kerry's next game was a Munster semi-final meeting with Cork. That game ended in a draw, however, Kerry were well beaten in the replay. 'The Kingdom' were subsequently banished to the qualifiers where they had some unimpressive wins over Longford, Sligo and Antrim. Kerry later lined out in the All-Ireland quarter-final and demolished Dublin, with O Sullivan contributing 0-3. Kerry then defeated Meath in a disappointing semi-final, with O'Sullivan scoring 1-1, the goal from an early penalty. For the second year in-a-row Kerry faced Cork in the All-Ireland final. Surprisingly, the men from 'the Kingdom' went into the game as slight underdogs. This tag appeared to be justified when O'Sullivan's side trailed by 1–3 to 0–1 early in the opening half. The Kerry team stuck to their game plan, helped in no small part by a Cork side that recorded fourteen wide's. At the final whistle Kerry were the champions again by 0–16 to 1–9. Darran lifted the Sam Maguire as captain of Kerry, becoming the first man from his club to do so.

In 2011, despite a narrow defeat by 1-12 to 1-11 in the All Ireland Final, Darran was nominated for Footballer of the Year, ultimately losing out to Alan Brogan.

In October 2018, O'Sullivan announced his retirement from inter-county football.

Sporting positions
| Preceded by Paul Galvin | Kerry Senior Football Captain; 2009 | Succeeded by Bryan Sheehan |
Achievements
| Preceded by Brian Dooher (Tyrone) | All-Ireland SFC winning captain 2009 | Succeeded by Graham Canty (Cork) |
