= Ray Carey =

Irish sportsperson

Personal information
- Native name: Réamonn Ó Ciardha (Irish)
- Born: 7 July 1986 (age 40) Cork, Ireland
- Height: 6 ft 0 in (183 cm)

Sport
- Sport: Gaelic football
- Position: Right Corner Back
Club
- Years: Club
- 2004-: Clyda Rovers
College
- Years: College
- Cork IT
College titles
- Sigerson titles: 1
Inter-county
Years	County	Apps (scores)
2009-	Cork	3 (0-0)
Inter-county titles
- Munster titles: 1
- All-Irelands: 1
- NFL: 2

Ray Carey (born 7 July 1986 Cork) is an Irish former sportsperson. Progressing from playing Gaelic football with his local club Clyda Rovers, he became a member of the Cork senior inter-county team in 2009 and won an All-Ireland senior medal in 2010.

== Playing career ==
=== Club ===
Carey plays his club football with his local club called Clyda Rovers.

=== Minor & under-21 ===
Carey first came to prominence on the inter-county scene as a member of the Cork minor football team in 2004. He made his debut in the provincial semi-final against Waterford. Cork easily won that game and later qualified for a Munster final showdown with Kerry. That game ended in a 0-9 apiece draw. Carey was dropped for the replay which Cork lost by three points.

Two years later in 2006 Carey had established himself on the starting fifteen of the Cork under-21 team. He lined out in the provincial decider that year against Waterford, however, the Decies were no match for 'the Rebels'. A 4-14 to 1-6 trouncing gave Cork the victory and gave Carey a Munster under-21 winners’ medal. Cork later maneuvered through the All-Ireland series and reached the All-Ireland final against Mayo. That game was a close affair, however, at the final whistle Cork were defeated by just two points.

In 2007 Carey was still an important member of the Cork under-21 team. He lined out in the provincial decider that year against Tipperary and a high-scoring game developed. Cork won by 3-19 to 3-12 and Carey added a second Munster under-21 winners’ medal to his collection. Cork later reached the All-Ireland final against Laois. Another close game of football developed as neither side took a decisive lead. Colm O'Neill and Daniel Goulding combined to score two goals and to help Cork win 2-10 to 0-15 victory. It was Carey's first All-Ireland winners’ medal at under-21 level.

=== Senior ===
In 2009 Carey joined the Cork senior football team. At the start of the year 'the Rebels' reached the Division 2 final of the National Football League. Monaghan were the opponents and a tough game was expected. Cork, however, won with relative ease by 1-14 to 0-12 and Carey collected a winners' medal in that competition. He made his senior championship debut at left corner-back against Waterford in the provincial quarter-final. Carey was chosen in the same position in Cork's next game against Kerry, however, he played no part in the replay of that game. He regained his place for the subsequent Munster final against Limerick. The game looked to be going away from Cork, however, ‘the Rebels’ fought back. Cork went on to win by a solitary point on a score line of 2-6 to 0-11. It was Carey's first Munster winners’ medal in the senior grade and gave Cork a safe passage into an All-Ireland quarter-final meeting with Donegal.Cork beat Donegal and faced 2008 All Ireland Champions Tyrone. Cork played great football to reach the All-Ireland where they were to meet Kerry. Carey however missed the Final through injury with an AC joint injury.

In 2010 Carey was a common presence in the Cork team that won the Div 1 NFL where they beat Mayo in the Final. Cork faced Kerry in the Championship and crashed out of the munster semi final after a 1-point defeat to Kerry after an extra time replay in Cork. Cork and Ray regrouped and victories over Cavan, Wexford, Roscommon and Dublin saw the Cork team back in another Final. Here they Played down and Cork won the All-Ireland on 19 September by 16 points to 15 where Ray Carey lined out as Number 4.

== Championship appearances ==
List of Appearances
#	Date	Venue	Opponent	Score	Result	W/L	Competition
1	24 May 2009	Fraher Field, Dungarvan	Waterford	0-0	2-18 : 1-7	W	Munster SFC quarter-final
2	7 June 2009	FitzGerald Stadium, Killarney	Kerry	0-0	1-10 : 0-13	D	Munster SFC semi-final
3	5 July 2009	Páirc Uí Chaoimh, Cork	Limerick	0-0	2-6 : 0-11	W	Munster SFC final

== Honours ==
=== Cork ===
- All-Ireland Senior Football Championship:
  - Winner (1): 2010
  - Runner-up (1): 2009
- Munster Senior Football Championship:
  - Winner (2): 2009, 2012
- National Football League (Div 1):
  - Winner (2): 2010, 2011,2012
- National Football League (Div 2):
  - Winner (1): 2009
- All-Ireland Under-21 Football Championship:
  - Winner (1): 2007
  - Runner-up (1): 2006
- Munster Under-21 Football Championship:
  - Winner (2): 2006, 2007
- Munster Minor Football Championship:
  - Winner (0):
  - Runner-up (1): 2004
