= Eoin Cadogan =

Irish hurler and Gaelic footballer

Personal information
- Native name: Eoin Ó Ceadagáin (Irish)
- Nickname: Cads
- Born: 1 September 1986 (age 40) Douglas, Cork, Ireland
- Occupation: Strength and conditioning coach
- Height: 1.85 m (6 ft 1 in)

Sport
- Football Position: Full-back
- Hurling Position: Full-back
Club
- Years: Club
- Douglas
Club titles
	Football	Hurling
Cork titles	0	0
College
- Years: College
- Limerick Institute of Technology
College titles
- Fitzgibbon titles: 1
Inter-county*
Years	County	Apps (scores)
2007–2017 2008–2021	Cork (F); Cork (H)	29 (0-00); 29 (0-01)
Inter-county titles
	Football	Hurling
Munster Titles	2	2
All-Ireland Titles	1	0
League titles	3	0
All-Stars	0	0
- *Inter County team apps and scores correct as of 22:19, 3 July 2021.

Eoin Cadogan (born 1 September 1986) is an Irish hurler and Gaelic footballer who plays for Cork Senior Championship club Douglas and at inter-county level with the Cork senior hurling team. He usually lines out as a full-back.

== Playing career ==
=== Douglas Community School ===
Cadogan first came to prominence as a hurler and Gaelic footballer with Douglas Community School. He played in all grades as a dual player before lining out for the school's senior football team in the Corn Uí Mhuirí.

=== Limerick Institute of Technology ===
On 10 March 2007, Cadogan was at midfield for the Limerick Institute of Technology when they faced NUI Galway in the Fitzgibbon Cup final. He was held scoreless and substituted at half-time in the 2–16 to 0–13 victory.

=== Douglas ===
Cadogan joined the Douglas club at a young age and played in all grades at juvenile and underage levels. On 28 November 2004, he was at midfield when Douglas defeated Youghal by 4–12 to 2–04 to win the Cork Minor Football Championship for the first time in their history.

On 18 December 2005, Cadogan was at centre-back on the Douglas under-21 hurling team that qualified for the final of the Cork Under-21 Championship. Douglas suffered a 0–13 to 0–10 defeat on that occasion.

On 5 October 2008, Cadogan was at full-back on the Douglas senior football team that faced Nemo Rangers in their first ever Cork Senior Championship final. He was praised for being "the one player on the Douglas side who was able to perform at [Nemo Rangers] standard", however, he was sent off after receiving two yellow cards in the 0–13 to 0–05 defeat.

On 11 October 2009, Cadogan scored two points when Douglas defeated Ballymartle by 0–20 to 0–16 to win the Cork Premier Hurling Championship.

=== Cork ===
==== Minor and under-21 ====
Cadogan first lined out for Cork as a dual player at minor level. He made his first appearance for the Cork minor football team on 8 March 2003 when he came on as a substitute in a 2–09 to 1-09 Munster Championship defeat by Tipperary. On 13 July Cadogan was at full-back when Cork suffered a 1–14 to 0–10 defeat by Kerry in the Munster final. He was also an unused substitute with the Cork minor hurling team during their Munster Championship campaign.

Cadogan was still eligible for the minor grade during the 2004 season and retained his status as a dual player. On 27 June he won a Munster Championship medal from right wing-back with the Cork minor hurling team after a 2–12 to 3–08 defeat of Tipperary in the final. On 15 July Cadogan was at centre-back with the Cork minor football team that lost the Munster final to Kerry by 0–13 to 1-07.

Cadogan continued as a dual player at under-21 level. On 13 April 2005, he was at left wing-back when the Cork under-21 football team defeated Limerick by 1–14 to 1–11 to win the Munster Championship. After the completion of the All-Ireland Championship, Cadogan linked up with the Cork under-21 hurling team. On 9 August, he won a Munster Championship medal after being introduced as a substitute in Cork's 4–09 to 0–13 defeat of Tipperary in the final.

On 13 April 2006, Cadogan won a second successive Munster Championship medal with the Cork under-21 football team. He was at left wing-back for the 4–14 to 1–06 defeat of Tipperary in the final. Cadogan was again at left wing-back for the 1–13 to 1–11 defeat by Mayo in the All-Ireland final on 7 May.

On 7 April 2007, Cadogan won his third Munster Championship medal with the Cork under-21 football team following a 3–19 to 3–12 defeat of Tipperary in the final. He lined out in his final game in the grade in the All-Ireland final on 5 May 2007. Cork defeated Laois by 2–10 to 0–15 with Cadogan, who was in his usual left wing-back position, winning his first All-Ireland Championship medal in any grade. Later that season he once again linked up with the Cork under-21 hurling team. On 1 August, Cadogan scored two points from centre-back in Cork's 1–20 to 0–10 defeat of Waterford to win the Munster Championship.

==== Senior ====
Cadogan was in his second year at under-21 level when he joined the Cork senior football team. On 27 January 2007, he claimed his first silverware when he played at centre-back on Cork's pre-season McGrath Cup-winning team. Cadogan made his first National League appearance on 3 February when he lined out at left wing-back when Cork suffered a 1–12 to 2–07 defeat by Donegal. On 1 July he was an unused substitute when Cork suffered a 1–15 to 1–13 defeat by Kerry in the Munster Championship final. On 19 August Cadogan made his championship debut when he came on as a 69th-minute substitute for Noel O'Leary in a 1–16 to 0-09 All-Ireland semi-final defeat of Meath. On 16 September he was an unused substitute when Cork lost to Kerry by 3–13 to 1–09 in the All-Ireland final.

Cadogan left the Cork senior football team and linked up with the Cork senior hurling team instead at the start of the 2008 season. He made his first appearance on 9 March in Cork's 3–18 to 2–16 defeat of Dublin in the National League. Cadogan made his first championship appearance on 12 July when he was named at right wing-back in Cork's 1–17 to 0–15 defeat of Dublin in the All-Ireland Qualifiers.

On 31 May 2009, Cadogan was selected to replace the retired Diarmuid O'Sullivan in the key full-back position. His performance was described as "outstanding" and he was awarded the man of the match title in spite of a 1–19 to 0–19 defeat by Tipperary. Cadogan was later named as the GAA/GPA Player of the Month for May. After Cork's exit from the All-Ireland Hurling Championship, he rejoined the Cork senior football team for the latter stages of the championship. On 20 September, Cadogan came on as a half-time substitute for Kieran O'Connor at right corner-back in Cork's 0–16 to 1–09 defeat by Kerry in the All-Ireland final.

Cadogan lined out with both of Cork's senior teams for the 2010 season. After lining out in the early rounds of the National Football League, an injury kept him out of the final game when Cork defeated Mayo by 1–17 to 0–12 to win the title on 25 April. On 11 July, Cadogan lined out in his first Munster Hurling Championship final when he was named at full-back in Cork's 2-15 apiece draw with Waterford. He was named in the same position for the replay a week which Cork lost by 1–16 to 1–13. After the Cork senior hurlers were eliminated from the championship, Cadogan committed fully to the Cork senior football team. On 19 September, he was named in the right corner-back on the Cork team that faced Down in the All-Ireland final. He ended the game with an All-Ireland medal after a 0–16 to 0–15 victory.

On 24 April 2011, Cadogan was an unused substitute when Cork defeated Dublin by 0–21 to 2–14 to win the National Football League title.

Cadogan won his first National Football League medal on the field of play on 29 April 2012. He was at left corner-back when Cork defeated Mayo by 2–10 to 0–11 to win the title. On 8 July, Cadogan was also at left corner-back when Cork defeated Clare by 3–16 to 0–13 to win the Munster Championship. He ended the season by being nominated for a GAA GPA All Star.

On 12 January 2013, Cadogan announced that he was committing exclusively to the Cork senior football team for the season ahead. In a statement released on Twitter he said: "I have taken this decision very reluctantly but after a period of reflection over the winter and a personal commitment to an education programme I will not be in a position this year to meet the demands of both codes." On 7 July Cadogan was at full-back when Cork were defeated by Kerry on a 1–16 to 0–17 scoreline in the Munster Championship final.

After spending much of the winter rehabbing from the Achilles, ankle and shoulder injuries he picked up during the 2013 season, Cadogan announced in January 2014 that he was rejoining the Cork senior hurling team while also lining out with the Cork senior football team. On 6 July he was at full-back when Cork suffered a 0–24 to 0–12 defeat by Kerry in the Munster Football Championship final. A week later Cadogan won a Munster Hurling Championship medal as a non-playing substitute following Cork's 2–24 to 0–24 defeat of Limerick in the last final to be played at the old Páirc Uí Chaoimh. At the end of the season he decided to concentrate solely on football for the 2015 season.

On 26 April 2015, Cadogan was at right wing-back when Cork suffered a 1–21 to 2–07 defeat by Dublin in the final of the National Football League. On 5 July 2015 he was moved to full-back when Cork drew with Kerry in the Munster Football Championship final. A hamstring injury ruled Cadogan out of the subsequent replay defeat.

On 2 July 2017, Cadogan was named on the bench for Cork's Munster Championship final meeting with Kerry. He was introduced as a 63rd-minute substitute for the black-carded Jamie O'Sullivan in the 1–23 to 0–15 defeat.

On 15 December 2017 it was announced that Cadogan was once again switching codes from Gaelic football to hurling. He immediately joined the training panel and made his first appearance on 7 January 2018 in a 4–17 to 0–18 defeat by Clare in the Munster League. On 1 July, Cadogan won a second Munster Hurling Championship medal following a 2–24 to 3–19 defeat of Clare in the final.

After a few seasons without success, Cadogan and Cork qualified for the 2021 All-Ireland Senior Hurling Championship Final where they faced holders Limerick. This saw Cadogan join the list of players to play in both an All-Ireland Senior Hurling Championship and All-Ireland Senior Football Championship final, and the first to do since Alan Kerins did so with Galway in 2001. Cork, however, lost the final as Limerick won a second title in a row on a 3–32 to 1–22 scoreline. On 26 November 2021, Cadogan announced that he would be retiring from intercounty hurling involvement.

== Career statistics ==
As of 3 July 2021.

Team	Year	National Hurling League			Munster		All-Ireland		Total		National Football League			Munster		All-Ireland		Total	
Team	Year	Division	Apps	Score	Apps	Score	Apps	Score	Apps	Score	Division	Apps	Score	Apps	Score	Apps	Score	Apps	Score
Cork	2007	Division 1A	—		—		—		—		Division 1A	4	0-00	1	0-00	0	0-00	5	0-00
Cork	2008	Division 1A	5	0-00	0	0-00	1	0-01	6	0-01	Division 2	—		—		—		—	
Cork	2009	Division 1	3	0-00	1	0-00	2	0-00	6	0-00	Division 2	—		—		2	0-00	2	0-00
Cork	2010	Division 1	5	0-00	4	0-00	2	0-00	11	0-00	Division 1	4	0-00	1	0-00	2	0-00	7	0-00
Cork	2011	Division 1	5	0-00	1	0-00	3	0-00	9	0-00	Division 1	6	0-00	2	0-00	2	0-00	10	0-00
Cork	2012	Division 1A	5	0-00	1	0-00	3	0-00	9	0-00	Division 1	5	0-00	2	0-00	2	0-00	9	0-00
Cork	2013	Division 1A	—		—		—		—		Division 1	5	0-00	2	0-00	2	0-00	9	0-00
Cork	2014	Division 1B	1	0-00	1	0-00	0	0-00	2	0-00	Division 1	4	0-00	1	0-00	2	0-00	7	0-00
Cork	2015	Division 1A	—		—		—		—		Division 1	8	0-02	1	0-00	1	0-00	10	0-02
Cork	2016	Division 1A	—		—		—		—		Division 1	6	0-00	1	0-00	3	0-00	10	0-00
Cork	2017	Division 1A	—		—		—		—			—		1	0-00	1	0-00	2	0-00
Cork	2018	Division 1A	6	0-00	2	0-00	1	0-00	9	0-00		—		—		—		—	
Cork	2019	Division 1A	3	0-00	4	0-00	2	0-00	9	0-00		—		—		—		—	
Cork	2020	Division 1A	3	0-00	0	0-00	0	0-00	3	0-00		—		—		—		—	
Cork	2021	Division 1A	3	0-00	1	0-00	0	0-00	4	0-00		—		—		—		—	
Career total			39	0-00	15	0-00	14	0-01	68	0-01		42	0-02	12	0-00	17	0-00	71	0-02

== Honours ==
=== Team ===
Limerick Institute of Technology

- Fitzgibbon Cup (1): 2007

Douglas

- Kelleher Shield (Senior Football League) (1) 2008
- Cork Premier Intermediate Hurling Championship (1): 2009
- Cork Minor Hurling Championship: (1): 2004

Cork

- All-Ireland Senior Football Championship (1): 2010
- Munster Senior Football Championship (2): 2009, 2012
- Munster Senior Hurling Championship (2): 2014, 2018
- National Football League (3): 2010, 2011, 2012
- McGrath Cup (3): 2007, 2014, 2016
- All-Ireland Under-21 Football Championship (1): 2007
- Munster Under-21 Football Championship (3): 2005, 2006, 2007
- Munster Under-21 Hurling Championship (2): 2005, 2007
- Munster Minor Hurling Championship (1): 2004

=== Individual ===
Awards

- GAA/GPA Player of the Month (1): May 2009
