= Nicholas Murphy (Gaelic footballer) =

Irish hurler and Gaelic footballer

Personal information
- Native name: Nioclás Ó Murchú (Irish)
- Nickname: Nicky
- Born: 23 April 1978 (age 48) Carrigaline, County Cork
- Height: 6 ft 5 in (196 cm)

Sport
- Sport: Gaelic football
- Position: Midfield
Club
- Years: Club
- 1996 - present: Carrigaline
Inter-county*
Years	County	Apps (scores)
1998 - 2012	Cork	49 (1-16)
Inter-county titles
- Munster titles: 5
- All-Irelands: 1
- NFL: 5
- All Stars: 1
- *Inter County team apps and scores correct as of 20 September 2009.

Nicholas Murphy (born 23 April 1978 in Carrigaline, County Cork) is an Irish sportsperson. He plays Gaelic football with his local club Carrigaline and was a member of the Cork senior inter-county team between 1998 and 2012.

== Playing career ==
=== Club ===
Murphy plays his club hurling and football with his local club in Carrigaline and has enjoyed some success. He first came to prominence with the club in the early 1990s as part of the minor football team that qualified for back-to-back county finals in 1995 and 1996. Murphy ended up on the losing side on both occasions. He ended up on the losing side in a number of county intermediate football finals also in the early 2000s, before winning the Cork Intermediate A Football Championship title in 2009. In 2015, he helped the club to win the Cork Premier Intermediate Football Championship after a win over St Michael's.

In 2008, Murphy was part of the Carrigaline hurling squad that defeated Bandon to take the Cork Intermediate Hurling Championship title.

=== Inter-county ===
Murphy first came to prominence on the inter-county scene as a member of the Cork football team at underage levels. He made his debut with the senior football team in 1998 in a Munster semi-final game against Kerry, a game which Cork lost.

The following year, Murphy began the season by capturing a National Football League winners' medal following a 0-12 to 1-7 victory over Dublin. Shortly after this victory, he lined out with the Cork senior footballers in the Munster football decider against Kerry. In poor weather conditions, Cork won by 2-10 to 2-4. It was Murphy's first Munster Senior Football Championship winners' medal. In September he lined out for the Cork footballers in the All-Ireland final against Meath. Ultimately Cork's hopes of doing the double were dashed as Meath won by 1-11 to 1-8.

Cork lost their provincial crown for the next few seasons, however, in 2002 Murphy's side tasted success once again. Tipperary surprisingly provided the opposition in the provincial final, however, the game ended in a draw. After a thrilling draw Cork trounced Tipp by 1-23 to 0-7 in the subsequent replay. It was Murphy's second Munster winners' medal. The subsequent All-Ireland semi-final pitted Cork against Kerry. It was the first time these rivals had met in Croke Park. Cork were beaten on a score line of 3-19 to 2-7. The year ended with the Cork hurling team going on strike. In turn, the football team joined in a sympathy strike. The players, who had been seeking better conditions, refused to play or train with the county again until the dispute with the county board was resolved.

Following the strike, the fortunes of the Cork football team took a turn for the worse. A series of defeats in 2003 and 2004 saw the Cork football team reach an all-time low. In 2005, Cork narrowly lost the Munster final but qualified for the All-Ireland semi-final where Kerry defeated them by 1-19 to 1-9.

In 2006, Cork won their first Munster title in four years following a defeat of Kerry. The two sides met again in the All-Ireland semi-final, however, in a similar pattern Kerry were victorious.

In 2007, Cork lost their Munster crown to Kerry, however, they made use of the qualifiers and found themselves in the All-Ireland final. Kerry, the old rivals, provided the opposition in the first all-Munster All-Ireland final. Kerry captured the title with a 3-13 to 1-9 victory. It was one of Cork's most humiliating defeats.

In 2008, Cork won the Munster title, beating Kerry in the final. It was Murphy's fourth Munster winners' medal. Kerry, however, again defeated Cork in a replay in the All-Ireland semi-final.

In November 2012, he announced he would retire from inter-county football.
