= Declan O'Sullivan =

Kerry Gaelic footballer

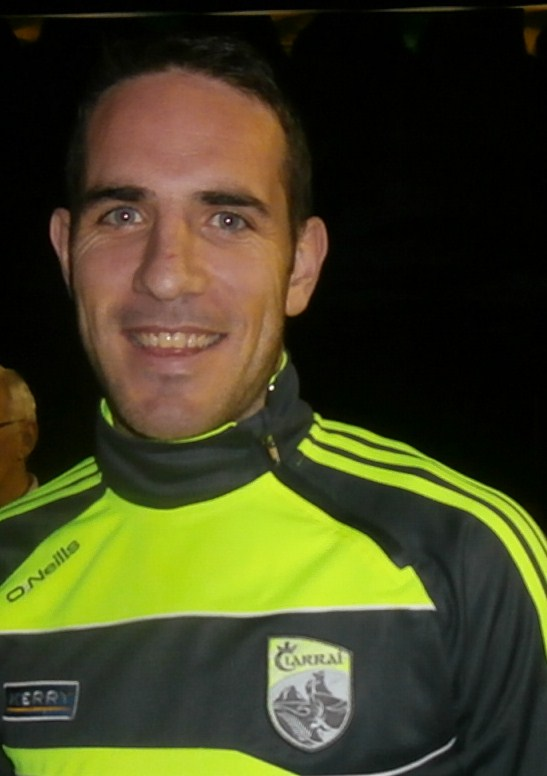

Personal information
- Native name: Déaglán Ó Súilleabháin (Irish)
- Born: 18 December 1983 (age 42) Tralee, Ireland
- Height: 1.83 m (6 ft 0 in)

Sport
- Sport: Gaelic football
- Position: Centre forward
Clubs
- Years: Club
- 1999–2015 2002–2015: Dromid Pearses; South Kerry
Club titles
- Kerry titles: 5
Inter-county
Years	County	Apps (scores)
2003–2014	Kerry	70 (8–83)
Inter-county titles
- Munster titles: 8
- All-Irelands: 5
- NFL: 3
- All Stars: 3

Declan O'Sullivan (born 18 December 1983) is an Irish former Gaelic footballer. He last played Gaelic football with his local club Dromid Pearses, his divisional side South Kerry and at senior level for the Kerry county team between 2003 and his retirement in 2014.

O'Sullivan captained Kerry to back-to-back All-Ireland titles in 2006 and 2007. He is regarded as one of the all-time great centre-forwards.

Since retirement, O'Sullivan has taken the role of selector with the Kerry junior team. As part of Jack O Connor's backroom team, in O'Sullivan's first season as selector, they captured the All-Ireland title. While O'Connor completed the historic back-to-back All-Ireland titles. O'Sullivan joined Jack O'Connor as selector for the Kerry under-21 football team for the 2016 Championship season.

== Playing career ==
=== Club ===
South Kerry

Born in Cahersiveen, County Kerry, O'Sullivan played his club football with his local club Dromid Pearses and with his divisional side South Kerry. After garnering minor and under-21 county titles with South Kerry, he later went on play at senior level.

In 2004 O'Sullivan had his first win when South Kerry qualified for the final of the county senior championship. The opponents on that occasion were Laune Rangers. The divisional side secured a 1–13 to 2–5 victory. It was O'Sullivan's first county senior winners' medal.

O'Sullivan's South Kerry side reached the county final again in 2005, this time with Dr. Croke's providing the opposition. In what was considered a dream final, after the sixty minutes South Kerry retained their title and O'Sullivan picked up a second county winners' medal.

In 2006 South Kerry still dominated the club championship in Kerry. The final that year was a repeat of 2005 as Dr. Crokes set out on a revenge match. At the full-time whistle South Kerry retained their title for a third consecutive year on a score line of 0–12 to 1–8. It was O'Sullivan's third county winners' medal.

South Kerry had the chance to make history in 2007 by capturing a fourth consecutive county title. His side found little difficulty in reaching the final. A divisional side from the other half of the county, Feale Rangers provided the opposition. O'Sullivan's side lost as Rangers went on to win by 1–5 to 0–6.

In 2009 for the third time in 5 years South Kerry and Dr. Crokes faced each other in the county final. South Kerry ran out one point winners on a score line of 1–08 to 0-10 giving Sullivan a fourth county championship medal.

Dromid Pearses

In 2004 he helped Dromid Pearses win their first ever South Kerry Senior Football Championship beating St Marys on a scoreline of 0–09 to 0–07 in the final.

After losing out in 2010 O'Sullivan led Dromid Pearses back to the final of the Junior County Championship and won them their first Junior title. They later added the Munster Junior Club Football Championship title to their winnings for the year.

=== Inter-county ===
Declan made his first championship appearance for Kerry in 2003 against Tipperary. He won the National Football League and All-Ireland Senior Football Championship 2004 with Kerry, beating Mayo GAA comfortably. In 2005 aged just 21, O'Sullivan was named Kerry senior football captain. In 2006 O'Sullivan captained Kerry to a comprehensive All-Ireland final victory over Mayo in the All-Ireland Senior Football Championship 2006 final. He had lost his place in the side after the Munster Final Replay defeat to Cork and was booed off by a minority of his own fans. However, he won his place back to lead the team out for the All-Ireland Final and scored the opening goal in the 4–15 to 3-05 defeat of Mayo before leading the team to lift Sam Maguire Trophy and shared the honour with Colm Cooper (who had captained the side in his absence). Again Kerry had completed a League Championship double.

In 2007, he scored a crucial goal against Monaghan and scoring 1–03 in a man of the match performance against Dublin, the latter coming in the classic semi-final. O'Sullivan was the winner of the Opel Gaelic Player of the Month award for August, and Kerry went on to claim the All-Ireland title by thrashing Cork 3–13 to 1–9. Kerry ironically became the first team to win consecutive titles since Cork in 1990 the same day, and O'Sullivan became the first person since Tony Hanahoe in 1977 to lift the Sam Maguire Trophy twice as captain. O'Sullivan was selected at centre-forward on the GAA All-Stars Awards team.

Declan was also the winner of a Munster minor football championship and a Munster Under-21 football championship as well as having Munster and All-Ireland Vocational Schools championship medals.

Declan is the fourth person after Dick Fitzgerald, John Joe Sheehy and Joe Barrett to twice captain Kerry to All-Ireland glory. He is also only one of eight people to lift the Sam Maguire cup twice.

He was replaced by Paul Galvin as captain of the Kerry footballers for the 2008 season. O'Sullivan also received a knee injury in June which ruled him out for eight weeks. This injury caused him to miss the 2008 Munster final. It would be 6 years before he failed to start another championship game. O'Sullivan returned to the Kerry starting 15 for the qualifier victory over Monaghan and followed that up with 4 points in Kerry's classic All-Ireland quarter final victory over Galway at a floodlit Croke Park. He also scored a goal in Kerry's semi final replay victory over Cork. In the 2008 All-Ireland senior football final against Tyrone, O'Sullivan contributed 2 points but famously missed great goal chance 4 minutes from time which would have given Kerry the lead. In the end Kerry were beaten by 4 points. At the end of the year O'Sullivan won his 2nd all-star award.

In 2009, after being knocked out of the Munster championship by great rivals Cork, they were near elimination from the All-Ireland series by minnows Sligo. Kerry were saved by the performances by O'Sullivan (0-04)and Paul Galvin (0-03) by a single point. Following another win over Antrim, Kerry progressed to an All-Ireland quarter final against former rivals Dublin. Kerry were widely considered as underdogs but produced one of the greatest performances in their storied history to win on a score line of 1–24 to 1-07, with O'Sullivan contributing 0–03. Following a semi final victory over Meath, Kerry progressed to another final meeting with Cork. O'Sullivan claimed his 4th all-Ireland winners medal at the age of 25. He also won a 3rd consecutive all-star award.

2010 began well for Kerry as wins over Cork and Limerick saw them regain the Munster title. However they were stunned by Down in the All-Ireland quarter final. This defeat marked the first time in O'Sullivan's inter-county career that Kerry failed to reach the All-Ireland semi final.

In 2011. They beat Cork to retain their Munster title, with O'Sullivan (0-05). Victories over Limerick and Mayo saw O'Sullivan and Kerry reach their 7th final in 8 years. In the final Kerry were stunned by a late Dublin comeback to lose by a single point.

2012 proved to be hugely disappointing for O'Sullivan and Kerry. Defeat to Cork in Munster meant another run through the back door was required. A win over Westmeath was followed by a 10 point loss over old foes Tyrone. O'Sullivan contributed 0–03 in Killarney. A 19-point defeat of Clare saw Kerry qualify for the quarter-finals yet again. However their season came to an end at the hands of eventual All-Ireland champions Donegal following a 2-point defeat. Afterwards Jack O'Connor resigned as Kerry manager with O'Sullivan's old teammate Eamon Fitzmaurice taking over the reins.

O'Sullivan intended to sit out the entire 2013 national league campaign but after Kerry lost their opening four games he returned to help the team avoid relegation. O'Sullivan was crucial to Kerry's eventual survival, playing a major role in their crucial win over Tyrone in Omagh. The championship began for Fitzmaurice's men when wins over Tippearary, Waterford and Cork saw them win yet another Munster. O'Sullivan (playing in a more advanced role) was again crucial as he scored a goal against Waterford in the semi-final. He then scored 2 points and set up Colm Cooper for the crucial goal in the final as he claimed a 7th provincial medal. A win over Cavan saw Kerry progress to a semi final against Dublin. O'Sullivan missed a 69th minute chance to put Kerry ahead before Dublin won the match with 2 late goals.

O'Sullivan turned 30 in December 2013 and sat out the entire 2014 national league campaign in order to deal with various injuries. He returned to score 2 points in Kerry's narrow Munster final win over Clare but aggravated an already troublesome knee injury. O'Sullivan appeared for the 2014 Munster final against Cork with both his knees heavily strapped. O'Sullivan started the quarter-final win over Galway but was subsequently benched due to his ongoing knee issues. The drawn semi-final with Mayo marked the first championship game Kerry had started without him since the 2008 Munster final. His final 3 appearances of the season came from the bench as Kerry claimed their 37th All-Ireland title. Afterwards manager Eamon Fitzmaurice confirmed O'Sullivan would need surgery on both knees over the winter but expressed confidence that he would return in 2015.

In November 2014, O'Sullivan announced his retirement due to injury.

== Honours ==
=== Dromd Pearses/South Kerry ===
- Kerry Senior Football Championship:
  - Winner (5): 2004, 2005, 2006, 2009, 2015
  - Runner-up (2): 2007, 2011
- Kerry Junior Football Championship:
  - Winner (1): 2011
  - Runner-up (1): 2010
- Munster Junior Club Football Championship:
  - Winner (1): 2011
- Kerry Under-21 Football Championship:
  - Winner (2): 2003, 2004
- Kerry Minor Football Championship:
  - Winner (3): 1999, 2000, 2001
- South Kerry Senior Football Championship:
  - Winner (1): 2004

=== Kerry ===
- All-Ireland Senior Football Championship:
  - Winner (5): 2004, 2006 (c), 2007 (c), 2009, 2014
  - Runner-up (4): 2002 (sub), 2005 (c), 2008, 2011
- Munster Senior Football Championship:
  - Winner (6): 2003, 2004 (sub), 2005 (c), 2007 (c) 2010, 2011, 2013, 2014
  - Runner-up (2): 2006 (c), 2008
- National Football League:
  - Winner (3): 2004, 2006 (c), 2009
  - Runner-up (1): 2008
- Munster Under-21 Football Championship:
  - Winner (1): 2002
  - Runner-up (2): 2003, 2004
- Munster Minor Football Championship:
  - Winner (1): 2001 (c)

=== Schools ===
- Munster Colleges A Championship:
- Winner (2): 2001, 2002
- All-Ireland Vocational Schools Senior Championship:
- Winner (1): 2000
- All-Ireland Vocational Schools Junior Championship:
- Winner (1): 2000
- Other :
- All-Ireland Interfrim Junior Football Championship (2014) - Lieberr
- Munster Interfirm Senior Football Championship (2004) - AIB Kerry
- Munster Interfirm Junior Football Championship (2014) - Lieberr
- Kerry Interfirm Senior Football Championship (2004) - AIB Kerry
- Kerry Interfirm Junior Football Championship (2014) - Lieberr

== See also ==
- List of All-Ireland Senior Football Championship winning captains

Sporting positions
Preceded by Dara Ó Cinnéide	Kerry Senior Football Captain; 2005	Succeeded by Colm Cooper
Preceded by Colm 'Gooch' Cooper	Kerry Senior Football Captain; 2006–2007	Succeeded by Paul Galvin
Achievements
Preceded by Brian Dooher (Tyrone)	All-Ireland SFC winning captain 2006–2007	Succeeded by Brian Dooher (Tyrone)
