= 2009 All-Ireland Senior Football Championship =

Football championship

Championship details
- Dates: 10 May – 20 September 2009
- Teams: 33

All-Ireland Champions
- Winning team: Kerry (36th win)
- Captain: Darran O'Sullivan
- Manager: Jack O'Connor

All-Ireland Finalists
- Losing team: Cork
- Captain: Graham Canty
- Manager: Conor Counihan

Provincial Champions
- Munster: Cork
- Leinster: Dublin
- Ulster: Tyrone
- Connacht: Mayo

Championship statistics
- No. matches played: 62
- Goals total: 108 (1.74 per game)
- Points total: 1530 (24.68 per game)
- Top Scorer: Colm Cooper (1–34)
- Player of the Year: Paul Galvin

The 2009 All-Ireland Senior Football Championship was the inter-county Gaelic football tournament played between 31 counties of Ireland, London and New York. The draw for the 2009 championship took place on 9 October 2008. The tournament began on 10 May 2009.

The 2009 All-Ireland Senior Football Championship Final took place on 20 September 2009, contested by Cork and Kerry. This was the year Tadhg Kennelly made history by becoming the first person to ever hold AFL Premiership and All-Ireland winning medals in the sports of Australian rules football and Gaelic football—he previously won the biggest prize in Australian rules with Sydney Swans in 2005.

== Structure ==
- Four knockout (single elimination format) provincial championships are played. London and New York compete in Connacht. The 4 provincial champions advance to the All-Ireland quarter-finals.
- The 16 teams eliminated before reaching a provincial semi-final compete in Round One of the Qualifiers (New York do not compete in the Qualifiers). The 8 Round One winners advance to Round Two.
- Qualifiers, Round Two: The 8 teams eliminated in provincial semi-finals each play one of the 8 Round One winners.
- Qualifiers, Round Three: The 8 Round Two winners play off to reduce the number to 4.
- Qualifiers, Round Four: The 4 teams eliminated in provincial finals each play one of the 4 Round Three winners.
- All-Ireland Quarter-finals: The 4 provincial champions each play one of the 4 Round Four winners.
- The winners of the All-Ireland Quarter-finals then advance to the Semi-finals, and the winners of the Semi-finals go on to the 2009 All-Ireland final.

== Fixtures and results ==
=== Leinster Senior Football Championship ===
1st round
Kildare	1–16
Offaly	1–10
Louth	1–13
Carlow	1–11
Wicklow	2–12
Longford	1–13

Quarter-finals
Kildare	2–12
Wexford	0–11
Laois	1–15
Louth	1–11
Westmeath	0–16
Wicklow	1–10
Dublin	0–14
Meath	0–12

Semi-finals
Kildare	2–18
Laois	0–09
Westmeath	0–11
Dublin	4–26

Final
Kildare	0–18
Dublin	2–15

17 May 2009
First round

Carlow	1–11 – 1–13	Louth
E McCormack 0–7, S Rea 1–0, S Myers, K Nolan, D St Ledger, M Carpenter 0–1 each	Report	D Clarke 0–4, R Finnegan 1–1, R Carroll 0–2, B White, P Keenan, D Reid, C Judge, S Lennon, JP Rooney 0–1 each

Parnell Park, Dublin

24 May 2009
First round

Kildare	1–16 – 1–10	Offaly
J Doyle 0–6, A Smith 1–1, J Kavanagh 0–3, R Sweeney, D Earley 0–2 each, H McGrillen, R Kelly 0–1 each	Report	S Ryan 1–0, J Reynolds, N McNamee 0–3 each, T Deehan, K Casey, R Dalton, N Darby 0–1 each

O'Moore Park, Portlaoise
Attendance: 12356
Referee: Aidan Mangan (Kerry)

24 May 2009
First round

Longford	1–13 – 2–12	Wicklow
P Berry 1–1, G Dennigan, F McGee 0–4 each, B Kavanagh, P Barden, D Barden, K Smith 0–1 each	Report	P Earls 1–2, R Nolan 1–1, T Hannon, S Furlong 0–4 each, D Odlum 0–1

O'Moore Park, Portlaoise

7 June 2009
Quarter-final

Dublin	0–14 – 0–12	Meath
C Keaney 0-5f, A Brogan 0–3, B Brogan (0-1f) and M Davoren 0–2 each, G Brennan and P Andrews 0–1 each	Report	C Ward 0–4, S McAnarney and B Farrell 0–2 each, M Ward, S Bray, C King, J Sheridan 0–1 each

Croke Park, Dublin
Attendance: 75,250
Referee: Marty Duffy (Sligo)

13 June 2009
Quarter-final

Kildare	2–12 – 0–11	Wexford
J Kavanagh, A Smith 1–3 each, D Earley, P O'Neill 0–2 each, D Flynn, J Doyle 0–1 each	Report	C Lyng, S Cullen 0–5 each, E Bradley 0–1

Dr. Cullen Park, Carlow

14 June 2009
Quarter-final

Wicklow	1–10 – 0–16 AET	Westmeath
T Hannon 0–4, D Odlam 1–1, J Stafford, L Glynn, S Furlong, D Hayden, JP Dalton 0–1 each	Report	F Wilson 0–5, C Lynam 0–4, D Glennon 0–3, F Boyle, D Duffy, K Scally, D Dolan 0–1 each

O'Connor Park, Tullamore

14 June 2009
Quarter-final

Louth	1–11 – 1–15	Laois
A Hoey 1–1, B White, D Clarke 0–3 each, S Lennon 0–2, P Keenan, C Judge 0–1 each	Report	MJ Tierney 0–6, P Clancy 1–3, P O'Leary 0–2, D Rooney, J O'Loughlin, B McCormack, R Munnelly 0–1 each

Parnell Park, Dublin

27 June 2009
Semi-final

Kildare	2–18 – 0–09	Laois
J Doyle 0–7, J Kavanagh 1–1, A Smith 1–0, R Sweeney 0–3, P O'Neill, E Callaghan 0–2 each, D Earley, E Bolton, M Conway 0–1 each	Report	D Kingston, MJ Tierney 0–3 each, B McCormack, P Clancy, G Reddin 0–1 each

O'Connor Park, Tullamore

28 June 2009
Semi-final

Westmeath	0–11 – 4–26	Dublin
C Lynam 0–5, D Glennon 0–3, J Connellan 0–2, D O'Shaughnessy 0–1	Report	B Brogan 2–8, J Sherlock 0–6, A Brogan 0–4, T Quinn 1–1, C Keaney 0–3, D Magee 1–0, B Cahill, R McConnell, P Flynn, D Connolly 0–1 each

Croke Park, Dublin

12 July 2009
Final

Kildare	0–18 – 2–15	Dublin
K Donnelly 0–3, M Conway, J Kavanagh, P O'Neill, R Sweeney, A Smith, J Doyle 0–2 each, D Earley, R Kelly, E Callaghan 0–1 each	Report	B Brogan 0–7, B Cahill, J Sherlock 1–1 each, C Keaney 0–3, A Brogan 0–2, C Whelan 0–1, G Brennan SO

Croke Park, Dublin
Attendance: 74,573
Referee: Pat McEnaney (Monaghan)

=== Munster Senior Football Championship ===
Quarter-finals
Waterford	1–07
Cork	2–18
Tipperary	1–09
Limerick	1–11

Semi-finals
Cork	1–17
Kerry	0–12
Clare	1–09
Limerick	1–13

Final
Cork	2–06
Limerick	0–11

24 May 2009
Quarter-final

Tipperary	1–09 – 1–11	Limerick
B Coen 1–2, B Grogan 0–4, H Coghlan, A Fitzgerald, B Mulvihill 0–1 each	Report	I Ryan 1–2, G Collins 0–4, C Joyce-Power 0–2, P Ranahan, S Lucey, K O'Callaghan 0–1 each

Semple Stadium, Thurles
Referee: M. McGann (Clare)

24 May 2009
Quarter-final

Waterford	1–07 – 2–18	Cork
S Walsh 1–0, B Wall 0–2, S O'Hare, W Hennessy, S Cunningham, M O'Gorman, G Hurney 0–1 each	Report	D O'Connor 1–5, P Kerrigan 1–2, J Miskella 0–3, J Masters, D Goulding, C O'Neill 0–2 each, M Shields, P O'Flynn 0–1 each

Fraher Field, Dungarvan

7 June 2009
Semi-final

Clare	1–09 – 1–13	Limerick
D Tubridy 0–4, G Brennan 1–0, G Quinlan 0–2, Gordon Kelly, E Coughlan, M O’Shea 0–1 each	Report	I Ryan 0–6, S Lavin 1–0, G Collins 0–3, S Lucey, J O’Donovan, S Buckely, E Hogan 0–1 each

Cusack Park, Ennis

7 June 2009
Semi-final

Kerry	0–13 – 1–10	Cork
B Sheehan 0–5, C Cooper 0–3, D Walsh 0–2, T Walsh, T Kennelly, D Ó Sé 0–1 each	Report	P O'Neill 1–2, D O'Connor 0–3, D Goulding 0–2, G Canty, N O'Leary, C O'Neill 0–1 each

FitzGerald Stadium, Killarney

13 June 2009
Semi-final Replay

Cork	1–17 – 0–12	Kerry
D O'Connor 1–5, D Goulding 0–5, J Miskella 0–2, P Kelly, P Kerrigan, J Masters, F Goold, P O'Flynn 0–1 each, N O'Leary SO	Report	C Cooper 0–4, Darren O'Sullivan, B Sheehan 0–2 each, Declan O'Sullivan, T Kennelly, D Moran, D Ó Sé 0–1 each, P Galvin SO

Páirc Uí Chaoimh, Cork

5 July 2009
Final

Limerick	0–11 – 2–06	Cork
I Ryan 0–4, S Buckley 0–3, S Lavin, P Ranahan, G Collins, S Kelly 0–1 each	Report	D Goulding 1–3, D O'Connor 1–1, J Masters, C O'Neill 0–1 each

Páirc Uí Chaoimh, Cork
Attendance: 20,676
Referee: R Hickey (Clare)

=== Connacht Senior Football Championship ===
Quarter-finals
New York	1–07
Mayo	1–18
Roscommon	2–13
Leitrim	2–09
London	1–07
Galway	1–18

Semi-finals
Mayo	3–18
Roscommon	0–07
Sligo	0–12
Galway	1–13

Final
Mayo	2–12
Galway	1–14

10 May 2009
Quarter-final

New York	1–07 – 1–18	Mayo
P Smith 0–4, R Moran 0–2, F Cleary, R Caffrey, T McGovern, J McNicholas 0–1 each	Report	A O'Shea 1–3, A Moran 0–4, A Dillon, A Kilcoyne 0–3 each, P Harte 1–0, T Mortimer 0–2, T Parsons, P Gardiner, R McGarrity, B Moran 0–1 each

Gaelic Park, New York City

24 May 2009
Quarter-final

London	1–07 – 1–18	Galway
M Alcorn 1–0, K Downes 0–2, J Hughes, A Moyles, K McMenamin, P Duffy, M Hughes 0–1 each	Report	M Meehan 1–5, S Armstrong 0–5, G Bradshaw, P Joyce 0–2 each, N Joyce, F Breathnach, C Bane, D Dunleavy 0–1 each

Ruislip, London

31 May 2009
Quarter-final

Leitrim	2–09 – 2–13	Roscommon
C Clarke, J McKeon 1–0 each, P McGuinness, James Glancy, R Cox 0–2 each, D Maxwell, T Beirne, S Foley 0–1 each	Report	D Shine 0–5, S Kilbride 1–1, K Mannion 1–0, G Cox 0–3, C Devaney, S McDermott, F Cregg, K Higgins 0–1

Páirc Sheáin Mhic Dhiarmada, Carrick-on-Shannon

20 June 2009
Semi-final

Mayo	3–18 – 0–07	Roscommon
A Dillon 0–6, A Kilcoyne 1–3, P Harte 1–1, A O'Shea 1–0, T Mortimer, R Garrity, P Gardiner 0–2 each, A Moran, M Ronaldson 0–1 each	Report	C Devaney, G Cox 0–2 each, K Mannion, D Shine, B Higgins 0–1 each

McHale Park, Castlebar

28 June 2009
Semi-final

Sligo	0–12 – 1–13	Galway
D Kelly 0–4, M Breheny, A Marren 0–2 each, R Donovan, J Davey, S Davey, S Coen 0–1 each, N Ewing SO	Report	S Armstrong 1–3, M Meehan 0–4, P Joyce 0–3, C Bane, J Bergin, G Bradshaw 0–1 each, G O'Donnell SO

Markievicz Park, Sligo

19 July 2009
Final

Mayo	2–12 – 1–14	Galway
C Mortimer 1–2, B Moran 1–0, D Heaney, A Dillon 0–2 each, P Gardiner, R McGarrity, P Harte, T Mortimer, A Kilcoyne, A O'Shea 0–1 each	Report	N Joyce 0–8, M Meehan 1–4, P Joyce, S Armstrong 0–1 each

Pearse Stadium, Galway

=== Ulster Senior Football Championship ===
1st round
Fermanagh	0–13
Down	0–10

Quarter-finals
Tyrone	2–10
Armagh	1–10
Derry	1–10
Monaghan	0–10
Cavan	0–13
Fermanagh	1–09
Antrim	1–10
Donegal	0–12

Semi-finals
Tyrone	0–15
Derry	0–07
Cavan	1–07
Antrim	0–13

Final
Tyrone	1–18
Antrim	0–15

17 May 2009
First round

Fermanagh	0–13 – 0–10	Down
R Carson 0–6, J Sherry 0–2, T McElroy, M Little, M McGrath, D Keenan, C McElroy 0–1 each	Report	A Carr, B Coulter, P McComiskey, D Hughes 0–2 each, S Kearney, P Fitzpatrick 0–1 each, A Carr SO

Brewster Park, Enniskillen

24 May 2009
Quarter-final

Derry	1–10 – 0–10	Monaghan
P Bradley 1–3, E Bradley, J Kielt 0–2 each, C McCaigue, B McGoldrick, J Diver 0–1 each, F Doherty SO	Report	P Finlay, T Freeman 0–3 each, R Ronaghan 0–2, S Gollogly, R Woods 0–1 each

Celtic Park, Derry

31 May 2009
Quarter-final

Tyrone	2–10 – 1–10	Armagh
S O'Neill 1–3, C Gormley 1–0, T McGuigan, S Cavanagh 0–2 each, Joe McMahon, O Mulligan, B Dooher 0–1 each, C Gormley SO	Report	R Clarke 1–0, A Kernan, S McDonnell 0–3 each, B Mallon 0–2, J Lavery, S Forker 0–1 each

St Tiernach's Park, Clones

6 June 2009
Quarter-final

Cavan	0–13 – 1–09	Fermanagh
S Johnston 0–5, M Reilly 0–4, C Mackey, S Brady 0–2 each	Report	E Maguire 1–0, M Little, R Carson 0–3 each, R Keenan, R McCluskey, B Owens 0–1 each

Breffni Park, Cavan

14 June 2009
Quarter-final

Donegal	0–12 – 1–10	Antrim
M Murphy 0–5, R Kavanagh 0–3, C McFadden 0–2, C Bonner, C Toye 0–1 each	Report	T McCann 1–2, P Cunningham 0–4, A Gallagher, M McCann, K Brady, K O'Boyle 0–1 each

MacCumhaill Park, Ballybofey

21 June 2009
Semi-final

Derry	0–07 – 0–15	Tyrone
E Bradley 0–4, B McGoldrick, P Bradley, S Bradley 0–1 each, K McGuckin SO	Report	T McGuigan 0–4, M Penrose 0–3, K Hughes 0–2, B Dooher, D Harte, S Cavanagh, Stephen O'Neill, Sean O'Neill, B McGuigan 0–1 each

Casement Park, Belfast

27 June 2009
Semi-final

Cavan	1–07 – 0–13	Antrim
S Johnston 0–4, D Givney 1–0, M Reilly, R Cullivan, L Reilly 0–1 each	Report	P Cunningham 0–4, M McCann, S Burke 0–2 each, T McCann, T O'Neill, J Loughery, A Gallagher, J Crozier 0–1 each

St Tiernach's Park, Clones

19 July 2009
Final

Tyrone	1–18 – 0–15	Antrim
S Cavanagh 1–4, O Mulligan, T McGuigan 0–3 each, Joe McMahon, K Hughes 0–2 each, R McMenamin, D Harte, B McGuigan, P Jordan 0–1 each	Report	P Cunningham 0–11, M McCann 0–2, A Gallagher, C Close 0–1 each

St Tiernach's Park, Clones

=== All-Ireland qualifiers ===
==== Round 1 ====
4 July 2009 Round 1	Donegal	2–13 – 1–06	Carlow	MacCumhaill Park, Ballybofey
	M Murphy 0–8, C Dunne 1–1, R Kavanagh 1–0, L McLoone, C Toye, D Gallagher, S Griffin 0–1 each	Report	JJ Smith 1–2, S Rea 0–2, D St Ledger, E McCormack 0–1 each

4 July 2009 Round 1	Monaghan	0–13 – 0–12; AET	Armagh	St Tiernach's Park, Clones
	P Finlay 0–6, C McManus 0–4, D Freeman, R Ronaghan, R Woods 0–1 each	Report	A Kernan 0–5, S McDonnell, S Forker 0–2 each, R Clarke, B Mallon, G O'Neill 0–1 each S McDonnell SO

4 July 2009 Round 1	Meath	1–20 – 0–08	Waterford	Páirc Tailteann, Navan
	C Ward 0–4, J Queeney 1–0, C O'Connor, D Bray, J Sheridan 0–3 each, C McGuinness, P Byrne, B Farrell 0–2 each, S McAnarney 0–1	Report	W Hennessy, L O'Lionnain 0–2 each, T Grey, B Wall, P Hurney, C McGrath 0–1 each

4 July 2009 Round 1	Wicklow	0–17 – 1–11	Fermanagh	Aughrim Park, Wicklow
	S Furlong 0–5, T Hannon 0–3, JP Dalton, D Odlum, P Earls 0–2 each, T Walsh, L Glynn, D Hayden 0–1 each, T Hannon, T Walsh SO	Report	D Keenan 0–4, J Sherry 1–0, M McGrath, S Quigley, R Carson 0–2 each, T McElroy 0–1

4 July 2009 Round 1	Wexford	2–11 – 0–16	Offaly	Wexford Park, Wexford
	PJ Banville 1–2, S Cullen 0–4, S Roche 1–0, C Lyng 0–3, R Barry, A Flynn 0–1 each	Report	N McNamee 0–6, PJ Ward 0–5, T Deehan 0–2, C McManus, S Lonergan, N Coughlan 0–1 each	Attendance: 2500; Referee: C Reilly (Meath)

4 July 2009 Round 1	Louth	1–12 – 2–10	Tipperary	Drogheda Park, Drogheda
	JP Rooney 1–3, B White 0–3, P Keenan, R Carroll, C Judge, S Lennon, A Hoey, D Maguire 0–1 each, D Crilly SO	Report	B Grogan 1–5, P Austin 1–0, B Coen 0–3, B Fox, R Costigan 0–1 each, M O'Donnell SO	Referee: S. Doyle (Wexford)

4 July 2009 Round 1	Down	1–16 – 1–07	London	Páirc Esler, Newry
	Daniel Hughes, P McComiskey, J Boyle 0–3 each, B.Coulter 1–0, B McArdle, C Garvey, D Gordan 0–2 each, R Sexton 0–1	Report	C Donnellan 1–0, P Duffy, K Downes, K McMenamin 0–2 each, P Geraghty 0–1

4 July 2009 Round 1	Leitrim	0–10 – 0–13	Longford	Páirc Sheáin Mhic Dhiarmada, Carrick-on-Shannon
	M Foley 0–4, P McGuinness 0–3, G Reynolds 0–2, D O'Connor 0–1	Report	P Berry 0–3, G Dennigan, F McGee, C Mimnagh 0–2 each, D Masterson, P Barden, B Kavanagh, D Barden 0–1 each

==== Round 2 ====
11 July 2009 Round 2	Down	2–09 – 0–07	Laois	Páirc Esler, Newry
	B Coulter 1–1, P McComiskey 1–0, D Hughes, A Carr, T Hanna 0–2 each, C Garvey, B McArdle 0–1 each	Report	MJ Tierney 0–4, B McDonald, B Quigley, N Donoher 0–1 each

11 July 2009 Round 2	Monaghan	0–20 – 3–16	Derry	St Tiernach's Park, Clones
	C Hanratty, P Finlay 0–4 each, R Woods 0–3, P Meegan, R Ronaghan, D Freeman 0–2 each, S Gollogly, B McKenna, C McManus 0–1 each	Report	Paddy Bradley 2–8, E Bradley 0–3, J Kielt 1–1, M Lynch 0–2, B McGoldrick 0–1, C McKaigue 0–1 each

11 July 2009 Round 2	Longford	0–11 – 1–12	Kerry	Pearse Park, Longford
	P Barden 0–4, D Barden 0–3, K Smith 0–2, F McGee, C Mimnagh 0–1 each	Report	C Cooper 0–5, T Walsh 1–2, S O'Sullivan 0–2, T Ó Sé, D Walsh, D O'Sullivan 0–1 each

11 July 2009 Round 2	Wexford	1–08 – 0–11	Roscommon	Wexford Park, Wexford
	C Lyng 1–2, S Cullen 0–3, E Bradley 0–2, S Roche 0–1	Report	S Kilbride 0–5, D Shine 0–3, K Higgins 0–2, B Higgins 0–1

11 July 2009 Round 2	Tipperary	1–12 – 1–13	Sligo	Semple Stadium, Thurles
	B Grogan 0–6, B Mulvihill 1–1, H Coghlan 0–2, B Coen, D O'Brien, A Fitzgerald 0–1 each	Report	A Marren 0–5, S Coen 1–1, M Breheny, D Kelly 0–2 each, M McNamara, T Taylor, A Costello 0–1 each	Referee: M. Deegan (Laois)

11 July 2009 Round 2	Donegal	0–13 – 1–07	Clare	MacCumhaill Park, Ballybofey
	M Murphy 0–5, C McFadden 0–4, C Toye 0–2, L McLoone, B Dunnion 0–1 each	Report	D Tubridy 1–4, E Coughlan 0–2, P O'Dwyer 0–1

11 July 2009 Round 2	Westmeath	1–05 – 1–15	Meath	Cusack Park, Mullingar
	M Flanagan 1–1, D Heavin, D Duffy, J Connellan, C Lynam 0–1 each	Report	J Sheridan 1–4, C Ward 0–6, P Byrne, S Bray 0–2 each, S Kenny 0–1

11 July 2009 Round 2	Wicklow	1–12 – 0–08	Cavan	Aughrim Park, Aughrim
	T Hannon 0–5, S Furlong 0–3, P Earls 1–0, P McWalter, D Hayden, L Glynn, JP Dalton 0–1 each	Report	L Reilly, S Johnston 0–3 each, P Brady, G Pearson 0–1 each

18 July 2009 Round 2 replay	Roscommon	0–11 – 0–08	Wexford	Dr. Hyde Park, Roscommon
	D Shine 0–9, K Higgins, D O'Gara 0–1 each	Report	C Lyng 0–3, A Morrissey, S Roche, R Barry, S Cullen, B Doyle 0–1 each

==== Round 3 ====
A draw was made for round 3 of the qualifiers, with the winners of round 2 playing each other.

18 July 2009 Round 3	Wicklow	1–15 – 0–17	Down	Aughrim Park, Aughrim
	T Hannon 0–6, L Glynn 1–3, S Furlong 0–4, JP Dalton, D Odlum 0–1 each	Report	P McComiskey 0–4, D Hughes 0–3, A Rodgers 0–2, C McGovern, T Hanna, C Garvey, D Gordon, B McArdle, B Coulter, R Sexton, R Murtagh 0–1 each

18 July 2009 Round 3	Kerry	0–14 – 1–10	Sligo	Austin Stack Park, Tralee
	D O'Sullivan 0–4, P Galvin 0–3, C Cooper 0–2, D Ó Sé, D Walsh, T Walsh, S O'Sullivan, B Sheehan 0–1 each	Report	A Marren 0–4, D Kelly 1–1, S Coen 0–2, M Breheny, E O'Hara, K Sweeney 0–1 each

18 July 2009 Round 3	Donegal	2–13 – 0–18; AET	Derry	MacCumhaill Park, Ballybofey
	M Murphy 0–5, C McFadden 1–4, K Cassidy 1–1, B Monaghan, B Roper, D Walsh 0–1 each	Report	J Kielt 0–5, E Bradley, M Lynch 0–3 each, P Bradley, B McGoldrick 0–2 each, G O'Kane, C McKaigue, G McShane 0–1 each

25 July 2009 Round 3	Meath	2–12 – 0–11	Roscommon	Páirc Tailteann, Navan
	D Bray 1–2, C Ward 0–4, P Byrne 1–1, B Farrell 0–3, N Crawford, B Meade 0–1 each	Report	D Shine 0–6, S Kilbride 0–3, M Finneran, D O'Gara 0–1 each

==== Round 4 ====
A draw was made for round 4 of the qualifiers, with the winners of round three (Donegal, Kerry, Meath and Wicklow) playing against the losing provincial finalists (Antrim, Galway, Kildare and Limerick).

25 July 2009 Round 4	Kildare	1–16 – 2–09	Wicklow	O'Moore Park, Portlaoise
	A Smith 1–2, J Doyle 0–4, D Earley 0–3, E Callaghan 0–2, J Kavanagh, M O'Flaherty, P O'Neill, R Kelly, B Flanagan 0–1 each	Report	S Furlong 1–4, T Hannon 1–0, D Odlum 0–2, P Earls, J Stafford, D Hayden 0–1 each

25 July 2009 Round 4	Galway	0–13 – 0–14	Donegal	Markievicz Park, Sligo
	M Meehan 0–4, P Conroy, M Clancy, S Armstrong 0–2 each, G Bradshaw, P Joyce, K Fitzgerald 0–1 each, D Blake SO	Report	C McFadden 0–6, M Murphy 0–5, L McLoone, R Kavanagh, D Walsh 0–1 each

26 July 2009 Round 4	Antrim	1–10 – 2–12	Kerry	O'Connor Park, Tullamore
	M McCann 0–4, P Cunningham 0–3, T Scullion 1–0, T McCann 0–2, C Close 0–1	Report	T Walsh, P Galvin 1–2 each, C Cooper 0–4, P O'Connor 0–2, S O'Sullivan, D O'Sullivan 0–1 each

1 August 2009 Round 4	Limerick	2–09 – 1–13	Meath	O'Moore Park, Portlaoise
	S Kelly 0–4, I Ryan 0–3, S Buckley, J O'Donovan 1–0 each, G Collins 0–2	Report	C Ward 1–2, S Bray 0–4, C O'Connor, P Byrne 0–2 each, C King, D Bray, B Farrell 0–1 each

=== All-Ireland series ===
Quarter-finals
Dublin	1–07
Kerry	1–24
Mayo	1–15
Meath	2–15
Cork	1–27
Donegal	2–10
Tyrone	0–16
Kildare	1–11

Semi-finals
Kerry	2–08
Meath	1–07
Cork	1–13
Tyrone	0–11

Final
Kerry	0–16
Cork	1–09

==== Quarter-finals ====
2 August 2009
Quarter-final

Cork	1–27 – 2–10	Donegal
P Kerrigan 1–4, J Miskella, D O'Connor 0–4 each, D Goulding, F Goold 0–3 each, P O'Neill, P Kelly, C O'Neill, P Kissane 0–2 each, G Canty 0–1	Report	M Murphy 0–6, S Griffin, R Kavanagh 1–0 each, B Monaghan, E McGee, B Roper, A Hanlon 0–1 each

Croke Park, Dublin
Attendance: 49,761

2 August 2009
Quarter-final

Tyrone	0–16 – 1–11	Kildare
S O'Neill 0–7, O Mulligan 0–3, B Dooher 0–2, D Harte, Justin McMahon, T McGuigan, M Penrose 0–1 each	Report	J Doyle 0–7, R Sweeney 1–0, M Foley, J Kavanagh, A Smith, E Callaghan 0–1 each

Croke Park, Dublin
Attendance: 49,761
Referee: G. O'Conamha (Galway)

3 August 2009
Quarter-final

Dublin	1–07 – 1–24	Kerry
A Brogan, B Brogan 0–3 each, C Keaney 1–0, B Cahill 0–1	Report	C Cooper 1–7, Declan O'Sullivan, Darren O'Sullivan 0–3 each, T O'Se, P Galvin, T Kennelly, P O'Connor 0–2 each, T O'Sullivan, S Scanlon, D Walsh 0–1 each

Croke Park, Dublin
Attendance: 81,890

9 August 2009
Quarter-final

Mayo	1–15 – 2–15	Meath
A O'Shea 1–1, C Mortimer 0–4, A Dillon, A Kilcoyne 0–3 each, T Mortimer 0–2, K Higgins, A Moran 0–1 each	Report	D Bray 1–3, C Ward 1–2, J Sheridan 0–4, B Farrell 0–3, J Queeney 0–2, N Crawford 0–1

Croke Park, Dublin
Referee: J. McQuillan (Cavan)

==== Semi-finals ====
23 August 2009
Semi-final

Cork	1–13 – 0–11	Tyrone
D O'Connor 0–4, D Goulding 1–1, P Kelly, C O'Neill 0–2 each, A O'Connor, P Kerrigan, P O'Neill, F Goold 0–1 each	Report	S O'Neill 0–4, O Mulligan 0–2, R McMenamin, D Harte, P Jordan, K Hughes, M Penrose 0–1 each

Croke Park, Dublin
Attendance: 53,492
Referee: J. Bannon (Longford)

30 August 2009
Semi-final

Kerry	2–08 – 1–07	Meath
T Walsh 1–2, Darren O'Sullivan 1–1, C Cooper 0–3, T Kennelly 0–2	Report	C Ward 1–4, B Farrell 0–2, J Sheridan 0–1

Croke Park, Dublin
Attendance: 50,770
Referee: G. O'Conamha (Galway)

==== Final ====
20 September 2009
15:30 (IST)
Final

Kerry	0–16 – 1–09	Cork
C Cooper 0–6, T Walsh 0–4, T Kennelly 0–2, T Ó Sé 0–2, Darren O' Sullivan 0–1, Declan O' Sullivan 0–1	Report	D Goulding 0–4, C O'Neill 1–1, D O'Connor 0–3, P Kelly 0–1

Croke Park, Dublin
Attendance: 82,286
Referee: M. Duffy (Sligo)

== Championship statistics ==
=== Miscellaneous ===
- Cork and Limerick met in the Munster final for the first time since 1901.
- Antrim reached their first Ulster final since 1970.
- Wicklow reached round 4 of the qualifiers, winning four championship games for the first time in their history.
- Mayo and Meath met for the first time in the championship since the 1996 All-Ireland Senior Football Championship Final.

=== Top scorers ===
Season

	Player	County	Tally	Total	Matches	Average
1	Colm Cooper	Kerry	1–34	37	7	5.29
2	Michael Murphy	Donegal	0–36	36	6	6
3	Cian Ward	Meath	3–26	35	7	5
4	Donncha O'Connor	Cork	3–25	34	6	5.67
5	John Doyle	Kildare	0–27	27	6	4.5
6	Bernard Brogan	Dublin	2–20	26	4	6.5
7	Tony Hannon	Wicklow	1–22	25	6	4.17
8	Donal Shine	Roscommon	0–24	24	4	6
–	Seánie Furlong	Wicklow	1–21	24	6	4
