= Mark Collins (Gaelic footballer) =

Irish Gaelic football player (born 1990)

Personal information
- Native name: Marc Ó Coileáin (Irish)
- Born: 25 February 1990 (age 36) Cork, Ireland
- Occupation: Accountant
- Height: 6 ft 2 in (188 cm)

Sport
- Sport: Gaelic Football
- Position: Right corner-forward
Club
Years	Club	Apps (scores)
2008–present	Castlehaven	62 (11-215)
Club titles
- Cork titles: 2
College
- Years: College
- 2009–2013: University College Cork
College titles
- Sigerson titles: 2
Inter-county*
Years	County	Apps (scores)
2011–present	Cork	34 (5-65)
Inter-county titles
- Munster titles: 1
- All-Irelands: 0
- NFL: 1
- All Stars: 0
- *Inter County team apps and scores correct as of 21:04, 11 November 2020.

Mark Collins (born 25 February 1990) is an Irish Gaelic footballer who plays for Premier Senior Championship club Castlehaven and at inter-county level with the Cork senior football team. He currently lines out as a right corner-forward.

== Career statistics ==
=== Club ===
As of match played 29 October 2023.

Team	Season	Cork		Munster		All-Ireland		Total	
Team	Season	Apps	Score	Apps	Score	Apps	Score	Apps	Score
Castlehaven	2008-09	4	1-02	—		—		4	1-02
Castlehaven	2009-10	4	0-23	—		—		4	0-23
Castlehaven	2010-11	3	3-04	—		—		3	3-04
Castlehaven	2011-12	5	1-23	—		—		5	1-23
Castlehaven	2012-13	6	1-23	3	0-12	—		9	1-35
Castlehaven	2013-14	6	1-06	1	0-00	—		7	1-06
Castlehaven	2014-15	4	1-08	—		—		4	1-08
Castlehaven	2015-16	6	0-10	—		—		6	0-10
Castlehaven	2016-17	4	0-06	—		—		4	0-06
Castlehaven	2017-18	3	1-22	—		—		3	1-22
Castlehaven	2018-19	7	0-46	—		—		7	0-46
Castlehaven	2019-20	2	0-15	—		—		2	0-15
Castlehaven	2020-21	5	2-15	—		—		5	2-15
Castlehaven	2021-22	5	1-06	—		—		5	1-06
Castlehaven	2022-23	5	0-04	—		—		5	0-04
Castlehaven	2023-24	6	0-14	—		—		6	0-14
Career total		75	12-227	4	0-12	—		79	12-239

=== Inter-county ===
As of match played 13 June 2021.

Team	Year	National League			Munster		All-Ireland		Total	
Team	Year	Division	Apps	Score	Apps	Score	Apps	Score	Apps	Score
Cork	2011	Division 1	0	0-00	0	0-00	2	0-00	2	0-00
Cork	2012	Division 1	6	0-06	2	0-00	0	0-00	8	0-06
Cork	2013	Division 1	5	0-04	2	0-03	2	0-03	9	0-10
Cork	2014	Division 1	8	1-08	2	0-02	2	0-00	12	1-10
Cork	2015	Division 1	9	2-04	3	0-02	1	0-01	13	2-07
Cork	2016	Division 1	7	0-07	1	2-01	3	0-08	11	2-16
Cork	2017	Division 2	6	0-07	3	0-04	1	0-00	10	0-11
Cork	2018	Division 2	7	1-28	2	1-04	1	0-02	10	2-34
Cork	2019	Division 2	6	0-10	2	0-18	4	2-13	12	2-41
Cork	2020	Division 3	1	1-05	2	0-08	—		3	1-13
Cork	2021	Division 2	3	1-03	0	0-00	0	0-00	3	1-03
Total			58	6-82	19	3-42	16	2-27	93	11-151

== Honours ==
University College Cork

- Sigerson Cup (2): 2011, 2013

Castlehaven

- Cork Senior Football Championship (2): 2012, 2013

Douglas

- Cork Premier Intermediate Hurling Championship (1): 2009

Cork

- Munster Senior Football Championship (1): 2012
- National Football League Division 1 (1): 2012
- McGrath Cup (3): 2014, 2016, 2018
- All-Ireland Under-21 Football Championship (1): 2009
- Munster Under-21 Football Championship (2): 2009, 2011
- Munster Minor Football Championship (1): 2008
- Munster Minor Hurling Championship (1): 2008
