= Cork GAA honours =

Gaelic Athletic Association awards

This is a list of athletes and teams who have won honours while representing Cork GAA in Gaelic games (i.e. football, hurling, etc). Cork achieved the Double in senior hurling and gaelic football in 1890 and 1990. Tipperary in 1895 and 1900 is the only other county to achieve this unique feat. The late Teddy McCarthy is the only person to hold the unique record of winning two all Ireland senior medals in hurling and gaelic football in the one year. Another Cork man Brian Murphy is the only man in the history of the GAA to win all Ireland medals at senior u21 and minor level in both hurling and gaelic football.

== Hurling ==
All-Irelands (94)

- All-Ireland Senior Hurling Championships: 30
  - 1890, 1892, 1893, 1894, 1902, 1903, 1919, 1926, 1928, 1929, 1931, 1941, 1942, 1943, 1944, 1946, 1952, 1953, 1954, 1966, 1970, 1976, 1977, 1978, 1984, 1986, 1990, 1999, 2004, 2005
- All-Ireland Intermediate Hurling Championships: 9
  - 1965, 1997, 2001, 2003, 2004, 2006, 2009, 2014, 2018
- All-Ireland Junior Hurling Championships: 11
  - 1912, 1916, 1925, 1940, 1947, 1950, 1955, 1958, 1983, 1987, 1994
- All-Ireland Under-21/Under-20 Hurling Championships: 14
  - 1966, 1968, 1969, 1970, 1971, 1973, 1976, 1982, 1988, 1997, 1998, 2020, 2021, 2023
- All-Ireland Minor Hurling Championships: 19
  - 1928, 1937, 1938, 1939, 1941, 1951, 1964, 1967, 1969, 1970, 1971, 1974, 1978, 1979, 1985, 1995, 1998, 2001, 2021
- All-Ireland Vocational Schools Championship: 9
  - 1970 (Cork County), 1996, 1997, 1998, 2000, 2005, 2006, 2007, 2008, 2009
- Centenary Cup: 1
  - 1984

Provincials (144)

- Munster Senior Hurling Championships: 55
  - 1888, 1890, 1892, 1893, 1894, 1901, 1902, 1903, 1904, 1905, 1907, 1912, 1915, 1919, 1920, 1926, 1927, 1928, 1929, 1931, 1939, 1942, 1943, 1944, 1946, 1947, 1952, 1953, 1954, 1956, 1966, 1969, 1970, 1972, 1975, 1976, 1977, 1978, 1979, 1982, 1983, 1984, 1985, 1986, 1990, 1992, 1999, 2000, 2003, 2005, 2006, 2014, 2017, 2018, 2025
- Munster Intermediate Hurling Championships: 15
  - 1964, 1965, 1967, 1969, 1997, 1999, 2001, 2003, 2004, 2005, 2006, 2009, 2010, 2014, 2015
- Munster Junior Hurling Championships: 21
  - 1912, 1916, 1923, 1925, 1929, 1932, 1937, 1938, 1940, 1947, 1950, 1955, 1958, 1959, 1960, 1983, 1984, 1987, 1992, 1994, 1996
- Munster Under-21/Under-20 Hurling Championships: 22
  - 1966, 1968, 1969, 1970, 1971, 1973, 1975, 1976, 1977, 1982, 1988, 1991, 1993, 1996, 1997, 1998, 2005, 2007, 2018, 2020, 2021, 2023
- Munster Minor Hurling Championships: 34
  - 1928, 1936, 1937, 1938, 1939, 1941, 1951, 1964, 1966, 1967, 1968, 1969, 1970, 1971, 1972, 1974, 1975, 1977, 1978, 1979, 1985, 1986, 1988, 1990, 1994, 1995, 1998, 2000, 2004, 2005, 2006, 2008, 2017, 2021

Leagues (15)

- National Hurling League Division 1: 15
  - 1926, 1930, 1940, 1941, 1948, 1953, 1969, 1970, 1972, 1974, 1980, 1981, 1993, 1998, 2025

Other (114)

- GAA All Stars Awards: 114
  - 1971 (2), 1972 (5), 1974 (2), 1975 (1), 1976 (5), 1977 (8), 1978 (6), 1979 (3), 1980 (2), 1981 (1), 1982 (3), 1983 (3), 1984 (6), 1985 (2), 1986 (7), 1987 (1), 1988 (1), 1990 (6), 1991 (3), 1992 (3), 1993 (2), 1999 (6), 2000 (2), 2003 (3), 2004 (7), 2005 (6), 2006 (2), 2008 (1), 2012 (1), 2013 (3), 2017 (2), 2018 (3), 2019 (1), 2024 (5)

== Camogie ==
- All-Ireland Senior Camogie Championships: 31
  - (click on year for team line-outs) 1934, 1935, 1936, 1939, 1940, 1941, 1970, 1971, 1972, 1973, 1978, 1980, 1982, 1983, 1992, 1993, 1995, 1997, 1998, 2002, 2005, 2006, 2008, 2009, 2014, 2015, 2017, 2018, 2023, 2024, 2026
- All-Ireland Intermediate Camogie Championships: 5
  - 2000, 2002, 2006, 2018, 2024
- All-Ireland Junior Camogie Championships: 7
  - 1973, 1980, 1983, 1984, 1996, 1999, 2004
- All-Ireland Minor Camogie Championships: 17
  - 1975, 1976, 1978, 1979, 1980, 1983, 1984, 1985, 1998, 1999, 2001, 2002, 2003, 2018, 2019, 2022, 2023
- National Camogie Leagues: 17
  - 1984, 1986, 1991, 1992, 1995, 1996, 1997, 1998, 1999, 2000, 2001, 2003, 2006, 2007, 2012, 2013, 2025

== Football ==
All-Irelands (55)

- All-Ireland Senior Football Championships: 7
  - 1890, 1911, 1945, 1973, 1989, 1990, 2010
- All-Ireland Under-21 Football Championships: 11
  - 1970, 1971, 1980, 1981, 1984, 1985, 1986, 1989, 1994, 2007, 2009
- All-Ireland Under-20 Football Championships: 1
  - 2019
- All-Ireland Minor Football Championships: 12
  - 1961, 1967, 1968, 1969, 1972, 1974, 1981, 1991, 1993, 2000, 2019, 2026
- All-Ireland Junior Football Championships: 17
  - 1951, 1953, 1955, 1964, 1972, 1984, 1987, 1989, 1990, 1993, 1996, 2001, 2005, 2007, 2009, 2011, 2013
- All-Ireland Vocational Schools Championships: 6
  - 1961 (Cork City), 1991, 1994, 2008, 2010, 2012
- Dr Croke Cups: 1
  - 1902

Provincials (133)

- Munster Senior Football Championships: 37
  - 1890, 1891, 1893, 1894, 1897, 1899, 1901, 1906, 1907, 1911, 1916, 1928, 1943, 1945, 1949, 1952, 1956, 1957, 1966, 1967, 1971, 1973, 1974, 1983, 1987, 1988, 1989, 1990, 1993, 1994, 1995, 1999, 2002, 2006, 2008, 2009, 2012
- Munster Junior Football Championships: 28
  - 1911, 1932, 1933, 1940, 1951, 1953, 1955, 1957, 1962, 1964, 1966, 1970, 1971, 1972, 1984, 1986, 1987, 1989, 1990, 1992, 1993, 1996, 2001, 2005, 2007, 2009, 2011, 2013
- Munster Under-21 Football Championships: 28
  - 1963, 1965, 1969, 1970, 1971, 1974, 1979, 1980, 1981, 1982, 1984, 1985, 1986, 1989, 1994, 2001, 2004, 2005, 2006, 2007, 2009, 2011, 2012, 2013, 2014, 2016 2019, 2021
- Munster Minor Football Championships: 31
  - 1939, 1952, 1959, 1960, 1961, 1964, 1966, 1967, 1968, 1969, 1971, 1972, 1973, 1974, 1976, 1977, 1981, 1983, 1985, 1986, 1987, 1991, 1992, 1993, 1999, 2000, 2005, 2007, 2010, 2021, 2022,2026
- McGrath Cups: 10
  - 1998, 1999, 2006, 2007, 2009, 2012, 2014, 2016, 2018, 2023

Leagues (12)

- National Football League Division 1: 8
  - 1952, 1956, 1980, 1989, 1999, 2010, 2011, 2012
- National Football League Division 2: 1
  - 2009
- National Football League Division 3: 1
  - 2020
- Munster Football League: 2
  - 1931–32, 1932–33

All Stars

== Ladies' football ==
- All-Ireland Senior Ladies' Football Championships: 11
  - 2005, 2006, 2007, 2008, 2009, 2011, 2012, 2013, 2014, 2015, 2016
- All-Ireland Senior B Ladies Football Championship: 1
  - 2007
- All-Ireland Intermediate Ladies' Football Championship: 1
  - 1998
- Ladies' National Football League: 11
  - 2005, 2006, 2008, 2009, 2010, 2011, 2013, 2014, 2015, 2016, 2017
- All-Ireland Junior Ladies' Football Championships: 1
  - 1995
- All-Ireland Under-18 Ladies' Football Championship: 12
  - 1985, 1988, 2003, 2004, 2006, 2007, 2011, 2015, 2016, 2017, 2019, 2022
- All-Ireland Under-16 Ladies' Football Championship: 9
  - 1984, 1986, 2002, 2004, 2005, 2007, 2008, 2013, 2014
- All-Ireland Under-14 Ladies' Football Championship: 9
  - 2000, 2001, 2002, 2003, 2006, 2011, 2012, 2013, 2019
