= Ronan McCarthy =

Irish Gaelic footballer and manager

Personal information
- Native name: Rónán Mac Cárthaigh (Irish)
- Born: 1973 (age 52–53) Douglas, Cork, Ireland
- Occupation: Secondary school principal
- Height: 6 ft 2 in (188 cm)

Sport
- Sport: Gaelic football
- Position: Right corner-back
Club
- Years: Club
- Douglas
Club titles
- Cork titles: 0
College
- Years: College
- 1991-1995: University College Cork
College titles
- Sigerson titles: 1
Inter-county
Years	County	Apps (scores)
1997-2002	Cork	16 (0-00)
Inter-county titles
- Munster titles: 2
- All-Irelands: 0
- NFL: 1
- All Stars: 0

Ronan McCarthy (born 1973) is an Irish Gaelic football manager and former player. At club level he played with Douglas and was a member of and later managed the Cork senior football team. McCarthy usually lined out as a defender.

== Playing career ==
McCarthy first came to prominence as a Gaelic footballer at juvenile and underage levels with the Douglas club. After being overlooked at schools' level for the Coláiste Chríost Rí team, he subsequently won a Sigerson Cup title in 1995 as a student at University College Cork. Two years later he won a County Intermediate Championship title with the Douglas intermediate team. McCarthy first appeared on the inter-county scene as a member of the extended panel of the Cork minor team that beat Mayo in the 1991 All-Ireland minor final. After being overlooked for the Cork under-21 team, he spent one season with the junior team before making his senior debut during the 1996-97 league. As a member of the team over the following six seasons, McCarthy won two Munster Championship medals and a National Football League title. He also lined out at right corner-back when Cork lost the 1999 All-Ireland final to Meath.

== Coaching career ==
McCarthy's coaching career began at various levels with the Douglas club, before taking charge of the club's senior team that lost the 2008 final to Nemo Rangers. He later became involved with various Cork development squads before becoming a selector with the Cork senior football team during Conor Counihan's last season in charge in 2013. McCarthy was retained by new manager Brian Cuthbert and served as coach of the Cork senior team for a further two seasons. After taking a break from inter-county activity he managed the Carbery Rangers club to their inaugural County Championship title in 2016. McCarthy returned to the Cork senior team as a selector under Peadar Healy in 2017 before being appointed as manager at the end of that season. His four seasons in charge saw Cork reclaim and secure their National League Division 2 status, while the team also beat Kerry for the first time in eight seasons. In his final season in charge, McCarthy was found to be in breach of COVID-19 restrictions by holding an unauthorised training session on Youghal beach and was handed a 12-week suspension by the GAA's Central Hearings Committee.

== Personal life ==
McCarthy was educated at Coláiste Chríost Rí before completing a Bachelor of Arts in Economics and French at University College Cork. He later qualified as a teacher and spent 20 years at Nagle Community School with his final two years as principal. In October 2016, McCarthy was appointed principal of Glanmire Community College.

== Honours ==
=== Player ===
University College Cork

- Sigerson Cup: 1995

Douglas

- Cork Intermediate Football Championship: 1997

Cork

- Munster Senior Football Championship: 1999, 2002
- National Football League: 1998-99
- All-Ireland Minor Football Championship: 1991
- Munster Minor Football Championship: 1991

=== Management ===
Carbery Rangers

- Cork Senior Football Championship: 2016

Cork

- National Football League Division 3: 2020
- McGrath Cup: 2014, 2018

== Career statistics ==
Managerial league-championship record by team and tenure
Team	From	To	Record				
Team	From	To	P	W	D	L	Win %
Cork	24 August 2017	7 September 2021	38	20	1	17	52.6

Sporting positions
Preceded by Peadar Healy	Cork Senior Football manager 2017-2021	Succeeded by Keith Ricken
