= Stephen O'Brien (Kerry Gaelic footballer) =

Kerry Gaelic footballer

Personal information
- Native name: Stiofáin Ó Bríain (Irish)
- Born: 27 February 1991 (age 35) Kenmare, Ireland
- Occupation: Chemical Engineer
- Height: 1.82 m (6 ft 0 in)

Sport
- Sport: Gaelic football
- Position: Wing forward
Club
- Years: Club
- 2009–: Kenmare Shamrocks
College
- Years: College
- UCC
College titles
- Sigerson titles: 1
Inter-county
Years	County	Apps (scores)
2014–2024	Kerry	42 (6-48)
Inter-county titles
- Munster titles: 8
- All-Irelands: 2
- NFL: 4

Stephen O'Brien (born 27 February 1991) is an Irish Gaelic footballer who plays for the Kenmare Shamrocks club and formerly for the Kerry county team.

== Underage and junior ==
He joined the county's under-21 team in 2011. Kerry sustained a 22-point loss to Cork in the Munster final. He was still underage in 2012 and for the second year in a row he was on the losing side in a Munster final to Cork after extra time.

== Senior ==
He made his debut for Kerry in the 2014 Munster Senior Football Championship semi-final against Clare and scored two points. He lined out in a first Munster Senior Football Championship when they faced Cork, he scored a point in a 0-24 to 0-12 win and a first Munster title. He missed out on Kerry's win over Galway in the All-Ireland quarter-final. He was back in the starting line up for the semi-final with Mayo scoring a point in a 1-16 each draw. An injury while out racing on his quad caused him to miss the 2014 All-Ireland Senior Football Championship semi-final replay win over Mayo. However, he started the 2014 All-Ireland Senior Football Championship Final at right half forward.

Retirements brought new opportunities for O'Brien in 2019. He scored Kerry's first goal against Dublin in five games during a 2019 National Football League fixture in Tralee. In the 56th minute of the 2019 All-Ireland Senior Football Championship semi-final against Tyrone, O'Brien scored his fifth championship goal after intercepting a pass from Kieran McGeary, distributing the ball and running the length of the field.

== Honours ==
Kerry

- All-Ireland Senior Football Championship (2): 2014, 2022
- Munster Senior Football Championship (8): 2014, 2015, 2016, 2017, 2018, 2019, 2021, 2022
- National Football League (4): 2017, 2020, 2021, 2022
- McGrath Cup (2): 2017, 2022

Kenmare Shamrocks

- Kerry Intermediate Football Championship (1):
  - 2016
- Munster Intermediate Club Football Championship (1):
  - 2016
- Kerry Junior Football Championship (1):
  - 2012
- Munster Junior Club Football Championship (1):
  - 2012
- All-Ireland Junior Club Football Championship (Runner-up):
  - 2013

Kenmare District Team

- Kerry Senior Football Championship (Runner-Up)
  - 2016
