= 2019 McGrath Cup =

Gaelic football competition in Munster, Ireland

Tournament details
- Province: Munster
- Year: 2019

Winners
- Champions: Clare (13th win)
- Manager: Colm Collins
- Captain: Gary Brennan

Runners-up
- Runners-up: Cork
- Manager: Ronan McCarthy
- Captain: Ian Maguire

Other
- Matches played: 3

The 2019 McGrath Cup is a Gaelic football competition in the province of Munster, played by county teams.

Four county teams competed in 2019, with Tipperary and Kerry sitting the competition out. Clare were the winners, their first win in 11 years.

== Format ==
Four teams compete. The contest is a straight knock-out. Drawn games go to extra time and possibly a free-taking competition.

== Fixtures ==
6 January 2019 Semi-Final	Limerick	0-07 (07) – (24) 3-15	Cork	Rathkeale
14:00 GMT (UTC±0)				Venue: Mick Neville Park
		Report		Referee: D O’Mahoney (Tipperary)

6 January 2019 Semi-Final	Waterford	1-06 (09) – (20) 1-17	Clare	Ballinacourty
13:00 GMT (UTC±0)				Venue: Gold Coast Resort
		Report		Referee: Conor Lane (Cork)

12 January 2019 Final	Clare	1-09 (12) – (09) 0-09	Cork	Milltown Malbay
14:00 GMT (UTC±0)				Venue: Hennessy Memorial Park
	Gls: Gordon Kelly 1	Report		Referee: Padraig O’Sullivan (Kerry)
