= Jamie O'Sullivan =

Irish Gaelic footballer

Personal information
- Native name: Séamus Ó Súilleabháin (Irish)
- Born: 19 December 1988 (age 37) Southampton, Hampshire, England
- Occupation: Engineer
- Height: 6 ft 3 in (191 cm)

Sport
- Sport: Gaelic football
- Position: Full-back
Club
- Years: Club
- 2006-present: Bishopstown
College
- Years: College
- University College Cork
College titles
- Sigerson titles: 1
Inter-county*
Years	County	Apps (scores)
2010-2018	Cork	19 (1-00)
Inter-county titles
- Munster titles: 1
- All-Irelands: 1
- NFL: 3
- All Stars: 0
- *Inter County team apps and scores correct as of 17:12, 30 December 2018.

Jamie O'Sullivan (born 19 December 1988) is an Irish Gaelic footballer who plays for Cork Senior Championship club Bishopstown. He currently plays as a centre-back, but can also be deployed as a full-back or as a corner-back. O'Sullivan was a member of the Cork senior football team that won the 2010 All-Ireland Championship.

Born in Southampton, O'Sullivan first came to prominence as a Gaelic footballer after moving to Cork. He enjoyed success at juvenile and underage levels with the Bishopstown club, however, it was as a member of the club's under-21 hurling team that he won Cork Under-21 Championship medals in 2006 and 2007. O'Sullivan subsequently won a Sigerson Cup medal with University College Cork in 2011.

O'Sullivan never played for Cork at minor level; he was added to the under-21 panel in 2009 and ended the year with an All-Ireland Championship medal. He joined the Cork senior football panel the following year and played a key role in helping the team to their first All-Ireland Championship title in 20 years. O'Sullivan also won the first of three successive National Football League medals that year before completing his silverware collection in 2012 by winning a Munster Championship medal.

O'Sullivan announced his retirement from inter-county football on 22 December 2018.

== Honours ==
University College Cork

- Sigerson Cup (1): 2011

Bishopstown

- Cork Under-21 A Hurling Championship (2): 2006, 2007

Cork

- All-Ireland Senior Football Championship (1): 2010
- Munster Senior Football Championship (1): 2012
- National Football League (3): 2010, 2011, 2012
- McGrath Cup (1): 2018 (c)
- All-Ireland Under-21 Football Championship (1): 2009
- Munster Under-21 Football Championship (1): 2009
