= Cork county football team =

Gaelic football team

Cork
- Sport: Football
- Irish: Corcaigh
- Nickname(s): The Rebels; The Leesiders
- County board: Cork GAA
- Manager: John Cleary
- Captain: Brian Hurley
- Home venue(s): Páirc Uí Chaoimh, Cork; Páirc Uí Rinn, Cork

Recent competitive record
- Current All-Ireland status: QF in 2026
- Last championship title: 2010
- Current NFL Division: 2 (1st in 2026)
- Last league title: 2012
First colours	Second colours

The Cork county football team represents Cork in men's Gaelic football and is governed by Cork GAA, the county board of the Gaelic Athletic Association. The team competes in the three major annual inter-county competitions; the All-Ireland Senior Football Championship, the Munster Senior Football Championship and the National Football League.

Cork's home ground is Páirc Uí Chaoimh, Cork. The current manager is John Cleary.

Cork was the third Munster county both to win an All-Ireland Senior Football Championship (SFC), as well as to appear in the final, following Limerick and Tipperary. The team last won the Munster Senior Championship in 2012, the All-Ireland Senior Championship in 2010 and the National League in 2012.

== History ==
Football has always been seen as the weaker of the two sports in Cork. The game is strongest in the west of the county and in Cork city. Success, especially at senior level, has been much more sporadic that with hurling. The biggest hindrance to success has been the presence of next-door neighbours Kerry. Cork has been the second strongest county in Munster since the 1940s and often one of the best in the country. Many very good Cork teams were unable to overcome Kerry when they met in the Munster final. Cork began the 1970s with three Munster titles in 4 years and the 1973 All-Ireland Senior Football Championship. But they then ran up against the great Kerry team of the 1970s and 1980s. In 1976, the two teams drew in the final of the Munster Senior Football Championship. The replay went to extra-time before two very controversial refereeing decisions saw Kerry victorious. Cork fell back after that for a number of years.

=== 1980s and 1990s ===
In 1983 Kerry was aiming to capture a record ninth consecutive Munster title; however, Cork pulled off one of their surprise victories. Kerry, however, won the next three Munster and All-Ireland titles. In 1987 Billy Morgan was back with Cork, this time as manager. That year Cork reclaimed the Munster Championship crown from the Kingdom. It was the first of four Munster titles in-a-row. They reached the All-Ireland final that year only to be defeated by Meath. In 1988 Cork were defeated by Meath for the second consecutive year after a replay. Having lost the previous two All-Ireland finals Cork were even hungrier for achievement in 1989. That year they captured the National Football League before facing Mayo in the championship decider. The game ended in victory for Cork who claimed their fifth-ever All-Ireland title. In 1990 Cork squared up to Meath in the All-Ireland final for the third time in four years. In a close game, Cork emerged victorious by two points to claim a second consecutive championship.

Cork surrendered their provincial title for the next two years, however, they reclaimed it in 1993. That year they reached another All-Ireland final; however, it was Derry who won their first All-Ireland title on that occasion. Cork won the next two Munster titles as well; however, they were later defeated in the All-Ireland semi-final on both those occasions. The defeat in 1995 brought an end to one of Cork's greatest-ever periods in football history. Four years later in 1999 Cork won the Munster title for the fifth time of the decade. They later faced old rivals, Meath, in the All-Ireland final; however, victory went to the Leinster men on that occasion.

=== 21st century ===
While it was expected that the team would build on the success of 1999, Cork went into decline as Kerry began to dominate in Munster. In 2002 Cork triumphed again and captured the Munster title after a victory over Tipperary in a replay. The subsequent All-Ireland semi-final saw Cork take on Kerry. It was a historic occasion as it was the first time that the two sides had met in Croke Park. Unfortunately, Cork was trounced on a scoreline of 3–19 to 2–7. The year ended with the Cork hurling team going on strike. In turn, the football team joined in a sympathy strike. The players, who had been seeking better conditions, refused to play or train with the county again until the dispute with the county board was resolved. The player's demands included having their own doctor at all Championship and League games, resolving disputes over travel arrangements and providing players with free gymnasium access. The strike was eventually resolved and all the demands were met.

Following the strike, the fortunes of the Cork football team took a turn for the worse. A series of defeats in 2003 and 2004 saw the Cork football team almost at an all-time low. In 2005 Cork narrowly lost the Munster final but qualified for the All-Ireland semi-final where Kerry was again waiting. The scoreline of 1–19 to 1–9 in favour of the men from the Kingdom tells its own story. In 2006 Cork won their first Munster title in four years following a defeat of Kerry. The two sides met again in the All-Ireland semi-final; however, in a similar pattern Kerry was victorious. In 2007 Cork lost their Munster crown to Kerry; however, they made use of the qualifiers and found themselves in the All-Ireland final. Kerry, the old rivals, provided the opposition in the first all-Munster All-Ireland final. The game started on a level pegging; however, Kerry ran riot and captured the title with a 3–13 to 1–9 victory. It was one of Cork's most humiliating defeats.

The Cork senior footballers and hurlers withdrew their services for almost 100 days from November 2007 until February 2008. For more on this see 2007–2008 Cork players' strike. In spite of this, Cork reached the All-Ireland SFC semi-final where they lost to old rivals Kerry after a replay. Cork retained the Munster SFC title in 2009. The team advanced to the 2009 All-Ireland SFC Final, overcoming 2008 All-Ireland SFC champions Tyrone along the way. Cork lost that game to Kerry by a scoreline of 1–9 to 0–16.

In April 2010, Cork won the National Football League Division 1 title with a 1–17 to 0–12 win against Mayo at Croke Park, in front of a crowd of 27,005.

On 19 September 2010, Cork won the All Ireland SFC football title, defeating Down at Croke Park by a scoreline of 0–16 to 0–15. In April 2011, Cork retained the National Football League after a 0-21 to 2-14 win against Dublin.

== Rivalries and supporters ==
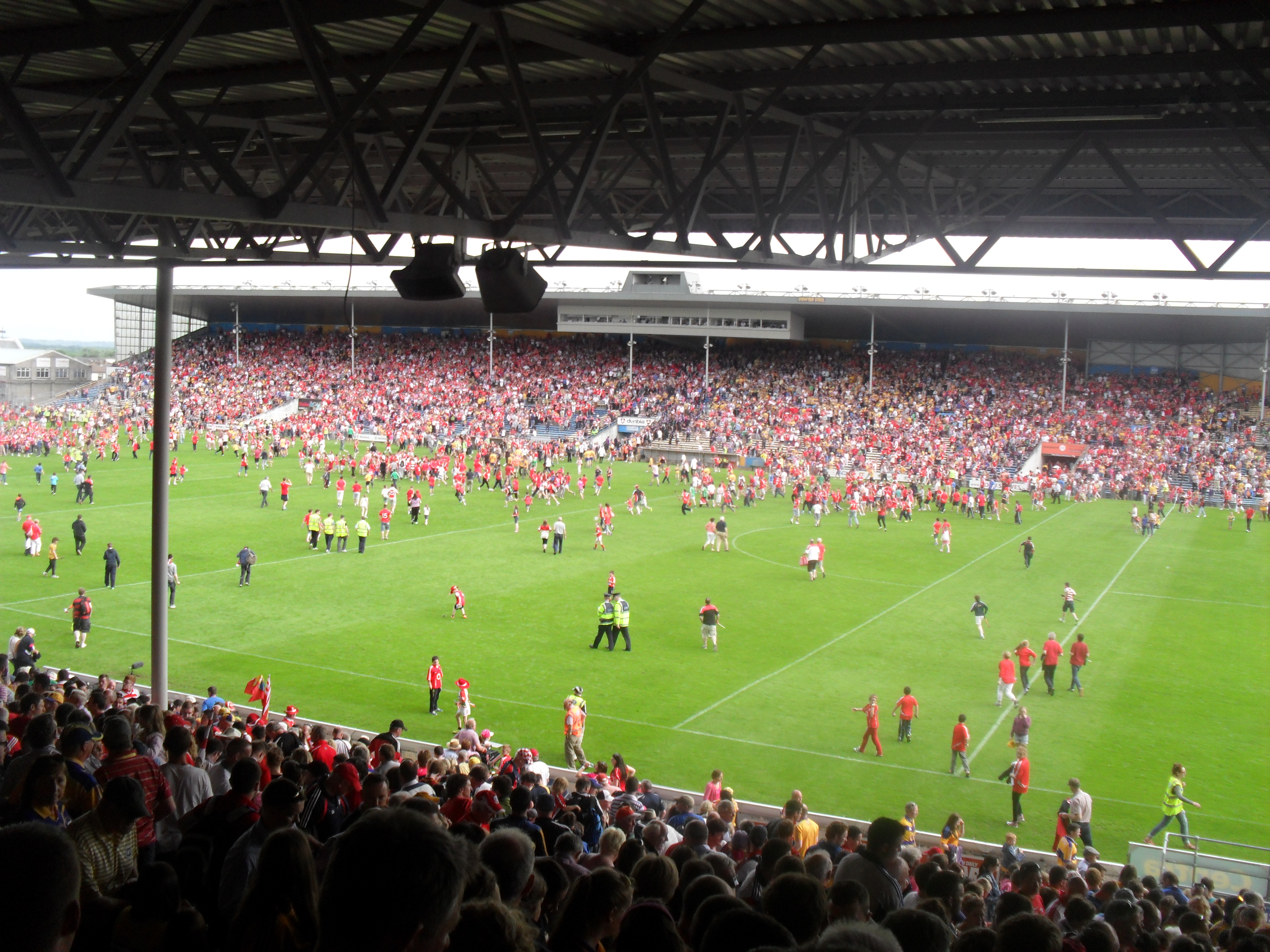
Cork supporters invade the field at Semple Stadium after a game in 2014.

In football, Kerry are undoubtedly Cork's biggest rivals as they meet year in year out in the Munster Senior Football Championship and recently in the All-Ireland series of games as well. Kerry are traditionally dominant, having won the Munster Championship over 75 times, while Cork have less than 40 titles. Kerry are similarly dominant in terms of All-Irelands won, topping the list with 39 titles as of their 2025 win while Cork have had seven titles with their 2010 triumph being the most recent.

The Cork footballers have also shared a rivalry with Meath in the past, though the intensity of this lowered during the 2010s as the two teams did not meet in the Championship for a number of years following the 1999 All-Ireland Final. The teams did not meet again until 2007, as the two counties met in the semi-final. Meath went into the match as favourites but Cork came out on top, setting up a final against Kerry.

Cork football support generally tends to be smaller compared to the support for the county's hurlers. However the Cork footballers enjoy the largest following in Munster. The Cork footballers possibly don't get the same level of support as their hurling counterparts because of their comparative lack of success. This is despite Cork being the fifth most successful football county in Ireland. Cork and Kerry well always draw 30,000 plus and Fitzgerald Stadium in Killarney is often a favourite among rebel supporters. In 2009 large crowds attended games against, Limerick and Tyrone, as well as the All-Ireland final against Kerry, to see a Cork team that were considered to be serious title contenders.

Roy Keane, the former association football player, has attended Cork games.

Adam Idah, another association football player, attended games when he was a boy.

== Current management team ==
Ratified mid-season in April 2022:

- Manager: John Cleary (interim manager)
- Selectors: Ray Keane (MTU/St Finbarr's), Barry Corkery (Éire Óg), James Loughrey (Mallow), Mícheál Ó Cróinín (Naomh Abán)
- Coach: Kevin Walsh, announced November 2022
- Performance coach: Rob Heffernan, announced November 2022

== Current panel ==
Team as per Cork vs Dublin in the All Ireland SFC Preliminary Quarter Final, 21 June 2025

No.	Player	Position	Club
1	Micheál Aodh Martin	Goalkeeper	Nemo Rangers
2	Seán Meehan	Right Corner Back	Kiskeam
3	Daniel O'Mahony	Full back	Knocknagree
4	Maurice Shanley	Left Corner Back	Clonakilty
5	Brian O'Driscoll	Right half back	Carrigaline
6	Seán Brady	Centre back	Ballygarvan
7	Mattie Taylor	Left half back	Mallow
8	Ian Maguire	Midfield	St Finbarr's
9	Colm O'Callaghan	Midfield	Éire Óg
10	Paul Walsh	Right half Forward	Kanturk
11	Seán Walsh	Centre forward	Mitchelstown
12	Seán McDonnell	Left half Forward	Mallow
13	Mark Cronin	Right Corner Forward	Nemo Rangers
14	Brian Hurley (c)	Full forward	Castlehaven
15	Chris Óg Jones	Left Corner Forward	Uíbh Laoire

No.	Player	Position	Club
16	Patrick Doyle	Substitute	Knocknagree
17	Neil Lordan	Substitute	Ballinora
18	Rory Maguire	Substitute	Castlehaven
19	Seán Powter	Substitute	Douglas
20	Luke Fahy	Substitute	Ballincollig
21	Conor Cahalane	Substitute	Castlehaven
22	Eoghan McSweeney	Substitute	Knocknagree
23	Ruairí Deane	Substitute	Bantry Blues
24	Conor Corbett	Substitute	Clyda Rovers
25	Cathail O'Mahony	Substitute	Mitchelstown
26	Hugh O'Connor	Substitute	Newmarket

^{INJ} Player has had an injury which has affected recent involvement with the county team.
^{RET} Player has since retired from the county team.
^{WD} Player has since withdrawn from the county team due to a non-injury issue.

== Managerial history ==
Cork — like Dublin, Kerry and Tyrone — traditionally appoints managers from inside, rather than seeking a "foreign" appointment.

Name	Club	From	To	All-Ireland titles	Munster titles
Billy Morgan	Nemo Rangers	1986	1996	1989, 1990	1987, 1988, 1989, 1990, 1993, 1994, 1995
Larry Tompkins	Castlehaven	1996	2003		1999, 2002
Billy Morgan	Nemo Rangers	2003	2007		2006
Teddy Holland	Clonakilty	2007	2008		
Conor Counihan	Aghada	2008	2013	2010	2008, 2009, 2012
Brian Cuthbert	Bishopstown	2013	2015		
Peadar Healy	Naomh Abán	2015	2017		
Ronan McCarthy	Douglas GAA	2017	2021		
Keith Ricken	St Vincent's	2021	2022		
John Cleary	Castlehaven	2022	Present		

== Players ==
=== Records ===
==== Texaco Footballer of the Year winners ====
1973: Billy Morgan
1989: Teddy McCarthy
1990: Shea Fahy

==== Football Team of the Century ====
Goalkeeper: Billy Morgan

Full-backs: Paddy O'Driscoll, P. A. Murphy, Caleb Crone

Half-backs: Kevin Jer O'Sullivan, Tadhgo Crowley, Din Connors

Midfielders: Dick Harnedy, Éamonn Young

Half-forwards: Mick Tubridy, Declan Barron, Donal O'Sullivan

Full-forwards: Jimmy Barry-Murphy, Ray Cummins, Billy Mackesy

==== Football Team of the Millennium ====
Goalkeeper: Billy Morgan

Full-backs: Paddy O'Driscoll, P. A. Murphy, Kevin Kehilly

Half-backs: Niall Cahalane, Tadhgo Crowley, Jimmy Kerrigan

Midfielders: Fachtna O'Donovan, Declan Barron

Half-forwards: Denis Kelleher, Larry Tompkins, Éamonn Young

Full-forwards: Jimmy Barry-Murphy, Ray Cummins, Dinny Allen

== Colours and crest ==
=== Kit evolution ===
Cork launched a new jersey ahead of the 2019 season, featuring a different sleeve and without white stripes down the side.

Cork launched a new jersey ahead of the 2021 season.

Cork launched a new jersey ahead of the 2023 season, with a noticeably whiter sleeve.

=== Team sponsorship ===
Cork was sponsored by O2 for 15 years. This arrangement ended on 31 December 2012. In 2013, Chill Insurance announced it would sponsor Cork in a three-year deal. Chill Insurance remained as sponsor for eight years until the end of 2020. Cork admitted in early 2021 that it had concluded a five-year deal with Sports Direct in December 2020, following public reports ahead of the intended launch. Following publication, it was subsequently confirmed that all negotiations were held with Sports Direct's Dublin-based marketing division, with no involvement from the British part of the company or from Mike Ashley, the billionaire owner of an English association football club with links to the company.

== Competitive record ==
=== Head-to-head record ===
Every Munster and All-Ireland SFC result since 2013, as of 27 June 2022.

Team	Pld	W	D	L	Win %	First Meeting	Last Meeting	Province
Donegal	1	0	0	1	0%		2016	Ulster
Dublin	3	0	0	3	0%	2013	2022	Leinster
Clare	2	2	0	0	100%	2013	2015	Munster
Kerry	10	1	1	8	13%	2013	2022	Munster
Kildare	1	0	0	1	0%		2015	Leinster
Limerick	5	5	0	0	100%	2013	2022	Munster
Laois	1	1	0	0	100%		2019	Leinster
Longford	1	1	0	0	100%		2016	Leinster
Louth	1	1	0	0	100%		2022	Leinster
Mayo	2	0	0	2	0%	2014	2017	Connacht
Roscommon	1	0	0	1	0%		2019	Connacht
Tipperary	5	3	0	2	50%	2014	2020	Munster
Tyrone	2	0	0	2	0%		2019	Ulster
Waterford	1	1	0	0	100%		2017	Munster
Sligo	1	1	0	0		2014	2014	Connacht
Galway	1	1	0	0		2014	2014	Connacht

== Results and fixtures ==
=== Results ===
Cork results in the Munster and All-Ireland SFC since 2021
Year	Competition		Home team	Score	Visitors	Score	Venue
2019	Munster SFC	Semi-finals					
2019	Munster SFC	Final					
2019	All-Ireland Qualifiers	Round 4					
2019	All-Ireland SFC	Group Stage					
2020	Munster SFC	Semi-finals					
2020	Munster SFC	Final					
2021	Munster SFC	Semi-finals	Cork	0-11	Kerry	1-16	Gaelic Grounds
2021	Munster SFC	Final	Kerry	4-22	Cork	1-09	Fitzgerald Stadium
2022	Munster SFC	Semi-finals	Cork	0-11	Kerry	0-23	Páirc Uí Rinn
2022	All-Ireland Qualifiers	Round 1	Cork	2-12	Louth	2-08	Páirc Uí Chaoimh
2022	All-Ireland Qualifiers	Round 2	Cork	2-18	Limerick	1-16	Páirc Uí Chaoimh
2022	All-Ireland SFC	Quarter-Finals	Dublin	0-21	Cork	0-10	Croke Park

== Honours ==
=== National ===
- All-Ireland Senior Football Championship
  - (gold) Winners (7): 1890, 1911, 1945, 1973, 1989, 1990, 2010
  - (silver) Runners-up (16): 1891, 1893, 1894, 1897, 1899, 1906, 1907, 1956, 1957, 1967, 1987, 1988, 1993, 1999, 2007, 2009
- National Football League
  - (gold) Winners (8): 1951–52, 1955–56, 1979–80, 1988–89, 1998–99, 2010, 2011, 2012
  - (silver) Runners-up (6): 1931–32, 1947–48, 1978–79, 1981–82, 1996–97, 2015
- National Football League Division 2
  - (gold) Winners (1): 2009
  - (silver) Runners-up (2): 2001, 2026
- National Football League Division 3
  - (gold) Winners (1): 2020
- All-Ireland Under-21/ Under-20 Football Championship (under-20 since 2018)
  - (gold) Winners (12): 1970, 1971, 1980, 1981, 1984, 1985, 1986, 1989, 1994, 2007, 2009, 2019
  - (silver) Runners-up (5): 1965, 1979, 2006, 2013, 2016
- All-Ireland Minor Football Championship
  - (gold) Winners (12): 1961, 1967, 1968, 1969, 1972, 1974, 1981, 1991, 1993, 2000, 2019, 2026
  - (silver) Runners-up (9): 1960, 1964, 1971, 1976, 1983, 1985, 1986, 1987, 2010
- All-Ireland Junior Football Championship
  - (gold) Winners (17): 1951, 1953, 1955, 1964, 1972, 1984, 1987, 1989, 1990, 1993, 1996, 2001, 2005, 2007, 2009, 2011, 2013
  - (silver) Runners-up (3): 1966, 1986, 1992
- All-Ireland Vocational Schools Championship
  - (gold) Winners (6): 1961 (Cork City), 1991, 1994, 2008, 2010, 2012
  - (silver) Runners-up (4): 1981, 1985, 2005, 2011

=== Provincial ===
- Munster Senior Football Championship
  - (gold) Winners (37): 1890, 1891, 1893, 1894, 1897, 1899, 1901, 1906, 1907, 1911, 1916, 1928, 1943, 1945, 1949, 1952, 1956, 1957, 1966, 1967, 1971, 1973, 1974, 1983, 1987, 1988, 1989, 1990, 1993, 1994, 1995, 1999, 2002, 2006, 2008, 2009, 2012
  - (silver) Runners-up (55): 1889, 1892, 1898, 1903, 1909, 1910, 1913, 1914, 1917, 1935, 1938, 1942, 1947, 1948, 1950, 1951, 1953, 1954, 1955, 1958, 1959, 1961, 1962, 1963, 1964, 1968, 1969, 1970, 1972, 1975, 1976, 1977, 1978, 1979, 1980, 1981, 1982, 1984, 1985, 1986, 1996, 2000, 2001, 2005, 2007, 2011, 2013, 2014, 2015, 2017, 2018, 2019, 2020, 2021, 2026
- Munster Football League
  - (gold) Winners (2): 1931–32, 1932–33
  - (silver) Runners-up (1): 1934–35
- McGrath Cup
  - (gold) Winners (12): 1998, 1999, 2006, 2007, 2009, 2012, 2014, 2016, 2018, 2023, 2024, 2026
  - (silver) Runners-up (3): 2019, 2020, 2022
- Munster Junior Football Championship
  - (gold) Winners (29): 1911, 1932, 1933, 1940, 1951, 1953, 1955, 1957, 1962, 1964, 1966, 1970, 1971, 1972, 1984, 1986, 1987, 1988, 1989, 1990, 1992, 1993, 1996, 2001, 2005, 2007, 2009, 2011, 2013
  - (silver) Runners-up (26): 1912, 1916, 1923, 1925, 1931, 1935, 1946, 1950, 1954, 1959, 1960, 1961, 1967, 1983, 1995, 1998, 2003, 2004, 2006, 2008, 2014, 2015, 2016, 2017, 2018, 2019
- Munster Under-21/ Under-20 Football Championship (under-20 since 2018)
  - (gold) Winners (28): 1963, 1965, 1969, 1970, 1971, 1974, 1979, 1980, 1981, 1982, 1984, 1985, 1986, 1989, 1994, 2001, 2004, 2005, 2006, 2007, 2009, 2011, 2012, 2013, 2014, 2016, 2019, 2021
  - (silver) Runners-up (21): 1962, 1966, 1972, 1973, 1976, 1977, 1978, 1983, 1990, 1991, 1992, 1997, 1999, 2015, 2017, 2018, 2020, 2022, 2023, 2024, 2025
- Munster Minor Football Championship
  - (gold) Winners (32): 1939, 1952, 1959, 1960, 1961, 1964, 1966, 1967, 1968, 1969, 1971, 1972, 1973, 1974, 1976, 1977, 1981, 1983, 1985, 1986, 1987, 1991, 1992, 1993, 1999, 2000, 2005, 2007, 2010, 2021, 2022, 2026
  - (silver) Runners-up (36): 1932, 1933, 1935, 1938, 1945, 1947, 1948, 1949, 1951, 1953, 1954, 1957, 1962, 1963, 1965, 1970, 1975, 1978, 1979, 1980, 1982, 1988, 1989, 1990, 1995, 1996, 2001, 2003, 2004, 2011, 2014, 2016, 2019, 2023, 2024, 2025
