= 2015 Munster Senior Football Championship =

Munster Senior Football Championship held by Munster GAA in 2015

The 2015 Munster Senior Football Championship will be that year's installment of the annual Munster Senior Football Championship held under the auspices of Munster GAA. It is one of the four provincial competitions of the 2015 All-Ireland Senior Football Championship. Kerry entered the competition as defending Munster champions and retained their title after a 1–11 to 1–6 victory over Cork in a replay.

The draw to decide the fixtures was made on 10 October 2014. Having reached the final the year before, Cork and Kerry were both given places in the semi-finals of the competition, but unlike previous seasons, they were not prevented from meeting each other in the semi-finals. Despite this, the two teams were drawn on different sides of the tournament, and so could not meet outside the final.

Under GAA rules introduced in 2014 to allow counties to more easily predict the dates of their qualifier matches, the two sides of the draw will be named as either A or B. Which sides will be A and B has yet to be decided.

== Teams ==
The Munster championship is contested by all six counties in the Irish province of Munster.

Team	Colours	Sponsor	Manager	Captain	Most recent success
Team	Colours	Sponsor	Manager	Captain	All-Ireland	Provincial
Clare	Saffron and Blue	Pat O'Donnell	Colm Collins	TBD		1992
Cork	Red and white	Chill Insurance	Brian Cuthbert	Michael Shields	2010	2012
Kerry	Green and gold	Kerry Group	Éamonn Fitzmaurice	Kieran Donaghy	2014	2015
Limerick	Green and white	Sporting Limerick	John Brudair	TBD	1896	1896
Tipperary	Blue and gold	Škoda Auto	Peter Creedon	Paddy Codd	1920	1935
Waterford	White and blue	3 Mobile	Tom McGlinchey	TBD		1898

== Bracket ==
Quarter-final refs

Semi-final refs

== Matches ==
=== Quarter Finals ===
31 May 2015
Quarter Final

Tipperary	1-24 - 0-5	Waterford
	Report

Semple Stadium Thurles
23 May 2015
Quarter Final

Clare	0-15 - 0-13	Limerick
	Report

Cusack Park Ennis

=== Semi Finals ===
14 June 2015
Quarter Final

Clare	1-8 - 1-20	Cork
	Report

Pairc Uí Rinn
14 June 2015
Quarter Final

Tipperary	2-8 - 2-14	Kerry
	Report

Semple Stadium Thurles

=== Final ===
5 July 2015
2.00 PM
Final

Kerry	2-15 - 3-12	Cork
J O’Donoghue (1-2, 1-0 pen), B Sheehan (0-4, 3 frees); BJ Keane (0-3, 1 free); K Donaghy (1-0); J Buckley, D Walsh, C Cooper, P Geaney, A Maher, F Fitzgerald (0-1 each)	Report	C O’Neill (1-6, 0-4 frees); D O’Connor (1-3, 0-2 frees); Barry O’Driscoll (1-1); K O’Driscoll (0-2)

Fitzgerald Stadium Killarney
Attendance: 35,651
Referee: Pádraig Hughes (Armagh)
18 July 2015
7.00 PM
Final Replay

Kerry	1-11 - 1-6	Cork
P Geaney 1-3 (0-1f), B Sheehan 0-5 (5fs), J O'Donoghue, D Walsh, J Lyne 0-1 each.	Report	P Kerrigan 1-0, C O'Neill 0-3 (1f, 1 '45'), K O'Driscoll, D O'Connor (f), Brian O'Driscoll 0-1 each.

Fitzgerald Stadium Killarney
Attendance: 32,233
Referee: Maurice Deegan (Laois)

== Miscellaneous ==
Although a revert to open draw Munster finalists remain in the semi-final draw a straight forward open draw rejected due to Waterford having 1 sided defeats to Kerry in 2007 and 2013 remained the same until 2025.

== See also ==
- 2015 All-Ireland Senior Football Championship
  - 2015 Connacht Senior Football Championship
  - 2015 Leinster Senior Football Championship
  - 2015 Ulster Senior Football Championship
