= Éamonn Fitzmaurice =

Kerry Gaelic footballer and manager

Personal information
- Native name: Éamonn Mac Muiris (Irish)
- Born: 1977 (age 48–49) Lixnaw, County Kerry, Ireland
- Occupation: Secondary school principal
- Height: 6 ft 1 in (185 cm)

Sport
- Sport: Gaelic football
- Position: Centre-back
Clubs
- Years: Club
- Finuge; Lixnaw; Feale Rangers; University College Cork
Club titles
	Football	Hurling
Kerry titles	3	1
Munster titles	1	0
Inter-county
Years	County	Apps (scores)
1996–2007	Kerry	105 (1–18)
Inter-county titles
- Munster titles: 9
- All-Irelands: 5
- NFL: 3
Inter-county management
- Years: Team
- 2012–2018: Kerry
Inter-county titles as manager
County	League	Province	All-Ireland
Kerry	1	6	1

Éamonn Fitzmaurice (born 1977) is an Irish Gaelic football manager and former player. He is the current manager of the Galway Senior football team. He played at senior level for the Kerry county team and later managed it between 2012 and 2018, during which time he became one of the small number of people to have won All-Ireland SFC titles as a player and as a manager.

He has been involved in 10 All Ireland wins - 1 minor, 2 under 21, 3 senior All Irelands as a player with Kerry, 1 All Ireland club junior with Finuge, 1 All Ireland junior club as coach with Fossa, 1 All Ireland as a selector and 1 All Ireland as a manager with Kerry.

Since departing as Kerry manager, he has continued to write a column with the Irish Examiner and is a co-commentator and analyst on The Sunday Game on RTÉ.

== Biography ==
Born in Lixnaw, County Kerry, Fitzmaurice was introduced to Gaelic football in his youth. He had some success at school level with Gaelcholáiste Chiarraí, while simultaneously experiencing championship successes at underage levels with the Finuge club. An All-Ireland medal winner in the intermediate grade, Fitzmaurice has a collection of Kerry novice, junior, intermediate and senior medals with the Finuge club and the Feale Rangers divisional side, captaining Feale Rangers to the senior county championship in 2007. Finuge won the All Ireland junior championship in 2005, becoming the first team from Kerry to do so with Fitzmaurice playing centre back. They beat Stewartstown Harps from Tyrone in the final. As a dual player he also won three county championship medals with the Lixnaw senior hurling team. He also won a Cork County Championship and a Munster Club Championship with UCC as a student in 1999.

Fitzmaurice made his debut on the inter-county scene at the age of sixteen when he first linked up with the Kerry minor team. An All-Ireland medal winner as a non-playing substitute in this grade in 1994, he later won two All-Ireland medals with the under-21 team in 1996 and 1998. Fitzmaurice made his senior debut during the 1996-97 league against reigning All-Ireland champion Meath. He played a key role for Kerry in defence, predominantly playing at centre half-back during a particularly successful era, and won three All-Ireland medals, six Munster medals and two National Football League medals.

Fitzmaurice was a member of the Munster inter-provincial team in 2004, but failed to win a Railway Cup medal. Throughout his inter-county career he made 50 championship appearances and 58 appearances in the national football league. Fitzmaurice retired from inter-county Gaelic football on 10 April 2007, aged 29.

On retiring, Fitzmaurice wrote a column for the Irish Examiner. He became involved in team management as a selector with the Kerry senior team under Jack O Connor. An All-Ireland winner in this role in 2009, he later had an unsuccessful tenure as manager of the Kerry under-21 team, a role he fulfilled for one season in 2012, as they lost the Munster final to Cork after an extra-time classic. Fitzmaurice was appointed manager of the Kerry senior team on 27 August 2012, becoming the youngest manager in Kerry's history at 35. At the time it was viewed as being handed a poisoned chalice as Kerry had not won a minor All Ireland since 1994 and had won only one Under 21 All Ireland in the 21st Century in 2008. Many of the successful team of the noughties that reached six All Ireland finals in a row had retired or were on the verge of retirement. He led Kerry to eight major honours in six seasons, including one All-Ireland Championship, six Munster Championships and one National League title. He had an overall win percentage of 64% and had a win percentage of 71% in the Championship. He resigned in August 2018, winning his final game against Kildare as Kerry failed to progress to the All-Ireland semi-finals from the inaugural Super 8 group stage.

In August 2022, Fitzmaurice ruled out a return to inter-county management and said he could not see himself managing another county team against Kerry.

For the 2021 and 2022 seasons Fitzmaurice was coach to the Adrian Sheehan managed Fossa in Killarney. Fossa were operating at Junior Premier level in Kerry. In 2021 they were beaten by near neighbours Listry in the quarterfinals. In 2022 they were promoted as champions in the county league and won the Junior Premier Championship beating Listry after extra time in the final. They went on to win the Munster and All Ireland junior titles. Fossa beat Stewartstown Harps from Tyrone in the All Ireland Final in Croke Park.

In September 2026, he was appointed as manager of the Galway senior football team on a 3 year contract succeeding Pádraig Joyce.

He served as a member of the Football Review Committee, which developed the set of rule changes instituted in the 2025 championship season.

== Personal life ==
A teacher of history at the co-educational school Pobalscoil Chorca Dhuibhne in Dingle since 2001, he succeeded the long-serving Pádraig Firtéar as principal in 2018.

== Career statistics ==
=== Player ===
Team	Year	National League			Championship		Total	
Team	Year	Division	Apps	Score	Apps	Score	Apps	Score
Kerry	1997	Division 1	2	0-0	0	0-0	2	0-0
Kerry	1998	Division 1	3	0-2	3	0-0	6	0-2
Kerry	1999	Division 2	5	0-1	0	0-0	5	0-1
Kerry	2000	Division 1A	6	0-0	6	0-2	12	0-2
Kerry	2001	Division 1A	5	0-0	6	0-0	11	0-0
Kerry	2002	Division 1A	8	0-1	9	0-1	17	0-1
Kerry	2003	Division 1A	3	0-0	4	0-0	7	0-0
Kerry	2004	Division 1A	8	0-0	7	0-0	15	0-0
Kerry	2005	Division 1A	4	0-1	6	0-1	10	0-2
Kerry	2006	Division 1A	9	0-6	7	0-3	16	0-9
Kerry	2007	Division 1A	4	0-0	0	0-0	4	0-0
Total			57	0-11	48	0-7	105	0-18

=== Manager ===
As of Match played August 2018.

Team	From	To	McGrath Cup				League				Munster				All-Ireland				Total				
Team	From	To	G	W	D	L	G	W	D	L	G	W	D	L	G	W	D	L	G	W	D	L	Win %
Kerry	27 August 2012	4 August 2018	10	7	0	3	45	26	3	16	14	13	1	0	17	9	3	5	86	55	7	24	64%

== Honours ==
=== Player ===
University College Cork

- Munster Senior Club Football Championship (1): 1999
- Cork Senior Football Championship (1): 1999
- All Ireland Freshers Championship (1): 1996
- Higher Education League - Division 1 (1) : 1996

Finuge

- Munster Intermediate Club Football Championship (1): 2012
- Kerry Intermediate Football Championship (1): 2012
- All-Ireland Junior Club Football Championship (1): 2005
- Munster Junior Club Football Championship (2): 2002, 2004
- Kerry Junior Football Championship (2): 2002, 2004
- Kerry Novice Football Championship (1): 1996
- North Kerry Football Championship (3): 1996, 2001, 2011

Lixnaw

- Kerry Senior Hurling Championship (3): 1999, 2005, 2007

Feale Rangers

- Kerry Senior Football Championship (1): 2007
- U21 Kerry Kerry Football Championship (2): 1997, 1998

Kerry

- All-Ireland Minor Football Championship (1): 1994
- All-Ireland Under 21 Football Championship (2): 1996, 1998
- All-Ireland Senior Football Championship (3): 2000, 2004, 2006
- Munster Senior Football Championship (6): 1998, 2000, 2001, 2003, 2004, 2005
- National Football League (2): 2004, 2006

=== Coach / Selector ===
Kerry

- All-Ireland Senior Football Championship (1): 2009
- Munster Senior Football Championship (1): 2010
- National Football League (1): 2009

Fossa

- All-Ireland Junior Football Championship (1): 2022
- Munster Junior Football Championship (1): 2022
- Kerry Junior Premier Football Championship (1): 2022

=== Manager ===
Pobalscoil Chorca Dhuibhne

- Hogan Cup (2): 2014, 2015
- Corn Uí Mhuirí (6): 2012, 2013, 2014, 2015, 2018, 2019
- O Sullivan Cup (2): 2012, 2018
- Paul McGirr Cup - U16.5 All Ireland (1): 2017
- Russell Cup (3) - 2009, 2010, 2011
- Frewen Cup (2) - 2012, 2017
- Moran Cup (2) - 2011, 2012
- Dunloe Cup (1) - 2011
- Bandon Cup (2) - 2008, 2009

Kerry

- All-Ireland Senior Football Championship (1): 2014
- National Football League (1): 2017
- Munster Senior Football Championship (6): 2013, 2014, 2015, 2016, 2017, 2018
- McGrath Cup (2): 2013, 2017

Achievements
Preceded by Jim Gavin (Dublin)	All-Ireland SFC winning manager 2014	Succeeded by Jim Gavin (Dublin)
Sporting positions
Preceded by John Kennedy	Kerry Under-21 Football Manager; 2011–2012	Succeeded by Darragh Ó Sé
Preceded by Jack O'Connor	Kerry Senior Football Manager; 2012–2018	Succeeded by Peter Keane
