= Baile na Cúirte =

Baile na Cúirte is the Irish name for two places in Ireland:

- Ballinacourty, County Waterford, a coastal townland near Dungarvan
- Courtown, County Wexford, a village and seaside resort
