= 2013 McGrath Cup =

Gaelic football competition

Tournament details
- Province: Munster
- Year: 2013
- Trophy: McGrath Cup

Winners
- Champions: Kerry (4th win)
- Manager: Éamonn Fitzmaurice

The 2013 McGrath Cup was a Gaelic football competition played by the teams of Munster GAA. The competition differs from the Munster Senior Football Championship as it also features further education colleges and the winning team does not progress to another tournament at All-Ireland level. The competition was won by Kerry, defeating Tipperary in the final by seven points.

== Teams ==
The following Third Level Colleges took part in 2013

- University College Cork (UCC)
- Tralee IT
- University of Limerick (UL)
- Cork Institute of Technology (CIT)
- Limerick Institute of Technology (LIT)

The following counties took part in 2013

- Cork
- Clare
- Kerry
- Limerick
- Tipperary
- Waterford

== Match Results ==
=== Preliminary round ===
- Kerry 4-22 IT Tralee 0-10
- Cork 1-15 Cork CIT 0-11
- Clare 1-20 Limerick IT 1-02

=== Quarter-finals ===
- Limerick 2-10 Clare 2-10
- Waterford 0-10 UL 0-10
- Cork 1-09 Tipperary 2-09
- Kerry 2-12 UCC 0-10

=== Semi-finals ===
- Kerry 3-17 Limerick 1-11
- Tipperary 1-12 Waterford 2-08 (AET)

=== Final ===
26 January 2013

Kerry	1-12 - 1-05	Tipperary
D O’Sullivan (1-3, 0-1f), P Geaney 0-3 (1f), T Ó’Sé, A Maher, B Sheehan (f), M Geaney, M O’Donoghue & P Curtin 0-1 each.	Report	B Grogan 1-4 (1-0 45, 0-3f), L McGrath 0-1.

Seán Treacy Park Tipperary Town
Attendance: 839
Referee: J Bermingham (Cork)
