= 2024 McGrath Cup =

Tournament details
- Province: Munster
- Date: 3–20 January 2024
- Teams: 6
- Defending champions: Cork

Winners
- Champions: Cork (12th win)
- Manager: John Cleary
- Captain: Seán Meehan

Runners-up
- Runners-up: Kerry
- Manager: Jack O'Connor

Other
- Matches played: 7

The 2024 McGrath Cup is an inter-county Gaelic football competition in the province of Munster, played by all six county teams in January 2024. Cork were the winners.

== Format ==
The teams are drawn into two groups of three teams. Each team plays the other teams in its group once, earning 2 points for a win and 1 for a draw. The two group winners play in the final. If the final is a draw, it is decided by penalty shoot-out without the playing of extra time.

== Results ==
=== Group A ===
Pos	Team	Pld	W	D	L	PF	PA	PD	Pts	Qualification
1	Kerry	2	2	0	0	65	21	+44	4	Advance to final
2	Tipperary	2	1	0	1	24	39	−15	2	
3	Limerick	2	0	0	2	21	50	−29	0	

Source: Munster GAA

=== Group B ===
Pos	Team	Pld	W	D	L	PF	PA	PD	Pts	Qualification
1	Cork	2	2	0	0	43	14	+29	4	Advance to final
2	Clare	2	1	0	1	35	30	+5	2	
3	Waterford	2	0	0	2	16	50	−34	0	

Source: Munster GAA

=== Final ===
20 January 2024 Final	Kerry	1-14 (17) – (17) 1-14 (3–4 pen)	Cork	Cork
19:00 IWT (UTC±0)				Venue: Páirc Uí Rinn
		Report		Referee: Donnacha O’Callaghan (Limerick)
		Penalty shootout
