= Paudge O'Connor =

Irish Gaelic footballer

Personal information
- Born: County Kerry, Ireland

Sport
- Sport: Gaelic football
- Position: Right half back
Club
- Years: Club
- 2010: Killarney Legion Killarney
Inter-county
- Years: County
- Kerry Kerry

Paudge O'Connor is a footballer from Killarney, County Kerry. He plays with the Killarney Legion club.

In 2010 he was selected to play with the inter-county for Kerry in the National League, the All-Ireland Senior Football Championship and was one of Legion's best players in the Kerry County Club Championship. O'Connor has been involved with the Kerry Minors and also played in the Kerry McGrath Cup team of 2010. When younger he also played soccer for Kerry in the Kennedy Cup (U13 soccer).
