= 2015 McGrath Cup =

Tournament details
- Province: Munster
- Year: 2015
- Trophy: McGrath Cup

The 2015 McGrath Cup is a Gaelic football competition played by the teams of Munster GAA. The competition differs from the Munster Senior Football Championship as it also features further education colleges and the winning team does not progress to another tournament at All-Ireland level. On 24 January, Waterford won their second McGrath Cup after a nine-point win over UCC at Fraher Field in Dungarvan. In front of a crowd of 907, Joey Veale, Maurice O’Gorman and Gavin Nugent got the three goals in a 3-12 to 1-9 victory.

== Teams ==
The following Third Level Colleges took part in 2015

- University College Cork (UCC)
- Tralee IT
- University of Limerick (UL)
- Cork Institute of Technology (CIT)
- Mary Immaculate College (Mary I)

The following counties took part in 2015

- Cork
- Kerry
- Tipperary
- Limerick
- Waterford

== Match Results ==
=== Preliminary round ===
4 January

- Waterford 1-16 UL 2-7 at WIT
- Cork 7-20 Mary I 0-4 at Mallow

=== Quarter-finals ===
11 January

- Kerry 0-16 Tralee IT 4-12
- Limerick 3-9 UCC 4-16
- Tipperary 0-12 Cork 1-14
- Waterford 1-11 CIT 0-9

=== Semi-finals ===
16 January

- UCC 0-18 Tralee IT 0-6

18 January

- Waterford 0-8 Cork 0-7

=== Final ===
24 January

- Waterford 3-12 UCC 1-9 at Fraher Field Dungarvan.
