= List of shipwrecks in February 1874 =

The list of shipwrecks in February 1874 includes ships sunk, foundered, grounded, or otherwise lost during February 1874.

== 1 February ==
List of shipwrecks: 1 February 1874
Ship	State	Description
Russia	United States	The steamship was damaged by a freshet at Buffalo, New York.
Surprise	United Kingdom	The schooner was wrecked on Oyster Bank, near Newcastle, New South Wales. Due to a heavy gale she was returning to Newcastle after departing for Sydney.

== 2 February ==
List of shipwrecks: 2 February 1874
Ship	State	Description
Flora MacDonald	New Zealand	The 18-ton cutter capsized and sank at the mouth of the Manukau Harbour in a southwesterly storm. All on board (the captain, mate, and six passengers) were lost.
Helene	Greece	The barque foundered off Chios. Her crew were rescued.
Peace	United Kingdom	The barque was wrecked at "Saint Anne's". At least two crew survived. She was on a voyage from Blyth, Northumberland to Guadeloupe.

== 4 February ==
List of shipwrecks: 4 February 1874
Ship	State	Description
Audus	United Kingdom	The schooner departed from Dunkirk, Nord, France for London. No further trace, presumed foundered with the loss of all hands.
Little Alice	United Kingdom	The steamship was driven ashore north of Montrose, Forfarshire.
Parana	United Kingdom	The schooner was driven ashore in the Dardanelles. She was on a voyage from Gemlik, Ottoman Empire to London. She was refloated on 8 February and resumed her voyage on 11 February. No further trace, presumed foundered with the loss of all hands.
Tiger	United Kingdom	The brig ran aground at Exmouth, Devon. She was refloated the next day.

== 5 February ==
List of shipwrecks: 5 February 1874
Ship	State	Description
Adsey	United Kingdom	The schooner was driven ashore at Filey Brig, Yorkshire.
Flora	United Kingdom	The schooner was driven ashore at Flamborough Head, Yorkshire. She was refloated.
Illinois	United States	The steamship was driven ashore at Caernarfon, United Kingdom. She was on a voyage from Philadelphia, Pennsylvania to Liverpool, Lancashire, United Kingdom. She was refloated and completed her voyage.
Mauritania	United Kingdom	The steamship ran aground in the River Mersey. She was on a voyage from Liverpool to Constantinople, Ottoman Empire.
Sidra	United Kingdom	The steamship departed from Malta for Suez, Egypt. Subsequently foundered in the Mediterranean Sea with the loss of all hands. Wreckage from the ship washed ashore at Benghazi, Ottoman Tripolitania.

== 6 February ==
List of shipwrecks: 6 February 1874
Ship	State	Description
Alessandro	Flag unknown	The ship departed from Newport, Monmouthshire, United Kingdom for Hong Kong. No further trace, presumed foundered with the loss of all hands.
Alida	United Kingdom	The ship departed from Liverpool, Lancashire for Rosario, Argentina. Subsequently foundered with the loss of all hands. The ship's papers washed up near Waterford in February.
Pleiades	United Kingdom	The schooner was driven ashore at Kilroot, County Antrim. She was on a voyage from Ayr to Belfast, County Antrim.
Riga	United Kingdom	The steamship collided with Elizabeth Ann (United Kingdom) and was beached on the Pluckington Bank, in Liverpool Bay. She was on a voyage from Bombay, India to Liverpool, Lancashire. She was refloated and taken in to Liverpool.
Yreka	United States	The ship departed from New York for Antwerp, Belgium. No further trace, presumed foundered with the loss of all hands.

== 7 February ==
List of shipwrecks: 7 February 1874
Ship	State	Description
Eastern Isles	United Kingdom	The steamship was driven ashore at the Birling Gap, Sussex.
Eliza Thornton	(United Kingdom of Great Britain and Ireland) Gibraltar	The ship departed from Cardiff, Glamorgan for Cádiz, Spain. No further trace, presumed foundered with the loss of all hands.
Soho	United Kingdom	The schooner was wrecked on the Corran Rocks, on the west coast of Scotland.
Star	United Kingdom	The barque ran aground at Flamborough Head, Yorkshire. She was on a voyage from Sunderland, County Durham to Nice, Alpes-Maritimes, France. She floated off but consequently foundered. Her crew were rescued by the fishing smack Oliver Cromwell (United Kingdom).
St. Jacques	France	The ship departed from Dunkirk, Nord for London, United Kingdom. No further trace, presumed foundered with the loss of all hands.

== 8 February ==
List of shipwrecks: 8 February 1874
Ship	State	Description
Fanny	United Kingdom	The ship collided with Triumph (United Kingdom) off Scarborough, Yorkshire and was abandoned by all but two of her crew, who were rescued by Triumph. No further trace of Fanny.
Rhone	United Kingdom	The steamship departed from Liverpool, Lancashire for Palermo, Sicily, Italy. She subsequently foundered with the loss of all 35 crew. Wreckage from the ship was discovered between Ouessant, Finistère, France and The Lizard, Cornwall.
Thomas Denham	United States	The ship departed from New York for Glasgow, Renfrewshire, United Kingdom. No further trace, presumed foundered with the loss of all hands.

== 9 February ==
List of shipwrecks: 9 February 1874
Ship	State	Description
Henrietta	Norway	The barque was abandoned in the North Sea. Her crew were rescued by the smack Victory (United Kingdom). Henrietta was on a voyage from Porsgrund to Hull, Yorkshire.

== 10 February ==
List of shipwrecks: 10 February 1874
Ship	State	Description
Eliza Young	United Kingdom	The barque was driven ashore and wrecked at Crookhaven, County Cork. She was on a voyage from Darien, Georgia, United States to Barrow-in-Furness, Lancashire.
Envoy	United Kingdom	The brig collided with another vessel in the Atlantic Ocean. She was abandoned 100 nautical miles (190 km) west of the Isles of Scilly on 12 February. Her crew were rescued by the barque Nuova Gamma (Italy). Envoy was on a voyage from Leith, Lothian to Havana, Cuba.
Lady Havelock	United Kingdom	The barque was wrecked on the Goodwin Sands, Kent. Her seventeen crew were rescued by the Ramsgate Lifeboat. She was on a voyage from Dalhousie, New Brunswick, Canada to Hull, Yorkshire.
Mary	United Kingdom	The schooner was driven ashore at Bergen, Norway. She was on a voyage from Larvik, Norway to Fraserburgh, Aberdeenshire.
Mary Ann	United Kingdom	The brig collided with an American ship in the Atlantic Ocean and was abandoned by all but two of her crew, who were rescued by the American ship. The remaining crew were rescued on 12 February by Lussignano Gladulich (Flag unknown) 150 nautical miles (280 km) south west of Cape Clear Island, County Cork. Mary Ann was on a voyage from Glasgow, Renfrewshire to Berbice, British Guiana.
Morning Star	United Kingdom	The schooner was wrecked at Ballinacourty, County Waterford. Her captain was rescued by the keeper of the Ballinacourty Lighthouse.
Panama	Norway	The barque foundered in the Atlantic Ocean. Her crew were rescued by the barque City of Bangor (United States). Parama was on a voyage from London, United Kingdom to Boston, Massachusetts, United States.

== 11 February ==
List of shipwrecks: 11 February 1874
Ship	State	Description
Alessandrissia	Greece	The brig was driven ashore from the Samphire Roads, off the coast of County Kerry, United Kingdom.
Alexandria	Russia	The brig was driven ashore at Fenit, County Kerry.
Assecuradeur	Germany	The barque was abandoned at sea. Her crew were rescued by the steamship Lope de Vega (Flag unknown). Assecuradeur was on a voyage from Liverpool, Lancashire, United Kingdom to Neufahrwasser.She was towed in to Baltimore, County Cork by the steamship Don (United Kingdom) the next day.
Athalia	United Kingdom	The sloop was driven ashore and wrecked in Dundalk Bay. Her crew were rescued. She was on a voyage from Silloth, Cumberland to Dundalk, County Louth.
B. H. Smith	United States	The fishing schooner sank in a gale on the Grand Bank. Lost with all 12 crewmen.
Borthwick	United Kingdom	The steamship ran aground between Brouwershaven and Hellevoetsluis, Zeeland, Netherlands.
Brothers	United Kingdom	The schooner was wrecked at Sandhammaren, Norway. She was on a voyage from Ventava, Courland Governorate to London.
Caladonio, or Campedoniaca	Italy	The barque sank off Crookhaven, County Cork, United Kingdom.
Conquest	United Kingdom	The schooner was driven ashore from the Samphire Roads.
Evangelistra	Greece	The ship ran aground at Lefkada and was severely damaged. She was on a voyage from "Astaco" to Malta.
Frientje	Netherlands	The ship was run aground on the Pye Sand, in the North Sea off the coast of Essex, United Kingdom. She was on a voyage from Groningen to London, United Kingdom. She was refloated and assisted in to Harwich, Essex.
Henry	United Kingdom	The schooner was wrecked on the coast of County Waterford.
Jane Maccaul	United Kingdom	The schooner was driven ashore from the Samphire roads.
Margaret Maccaul	United Kingdom	The schooner was driven ashore from the Samphire Roads.
Mary	United Kingdom	The schooner was driven ashore at Bergen, Norway. She was on a voyage from Larvik, Norway to Fraserburgh, Aberdeenshire.
Messina	Italy	The steamship ran aground off Bari.
Northern Light	United Kingdom	The schooner was driven ashore at Warrenpoint, County Antrim. She was on a voyage from Preston, Lancashire to Newry, County Antrim.
Priory	United Kingdom	The smack was driven ashore at Milford Haven, Pembrokeshire.
Pulcinella	Italy	The ship was driven ashore at Berehaven, County Cork with the loss of all but one of her crew.
Sailor Prince	United Kingdom	The barque sank off Crookhaven.
Satyr	United Kingdom	The schooner was driven against the quayside and severely damaged at Queenstown, County Cork.
Seaward	United Kingdom	The schooner struck a submerged object and sank in the Samphire Roads off Fenit. Her crew survived.
Shamrock	United Kingdom	The steamship was run down and sunk in the North Sea off the Bull Lightship ( Trinity House) by a Russian barque. Her crew were rescued. Shamrock was on a voyage from Grimsby, Lincolnshire to Alexandria, Khedivate of Egypt.
Sir Bevis	United Kingdom	The steamship was run into by the steamship Ben Nevis (United Kingdom) and sank at Cardiff, Glamorgan. Sir Bevis was refloated on 27 February and taken into a dry dock.
Successor	United Kingdom	The schooner was driven ashore on Emmanuel Point, Lindisfarne, Northumberland. She was on a voyage from Stettin, Germany to Berwick upon Tweed, Northumberland. She was refloated and taken in to Berwick upon Tweed in a severely damaged condition.
Tidal Wave	United Kingdom	The ship was abandoned in the Atlantic Ocean 40 nautical miles (74 km) off Cape Clear Island, County Cork. Her crew were rescued by Forsoget (Flag unknown). Tidal Wave was on a voyage from Philadelphia, Pennsylvania, United States to Bremen, Germany.
Trial	United Kingdom	The brigantine was driven ashore and wrecked at Penzance, Cornwall. Her crew were rescued by rocket apparatus. She was on a voyage from Connah's Quay, Flintshire to Plymouth, Devon.
Viceroy	United Kingdom	The steamship ran aground in the Grand Harbour, Malta. She was on a voyagbe from Calcutta, India to a British port. She was refloated the next day and resumed her voyage on 13 February.
Three unnamed vessels	United Kingdom	The yawls were wrecked at Kinsale, County Cork.
Unnamed	Netherlands	The brig foundered in the Atlantic Ocean 120 nautical miles (220 km) south west of Cape Clear Island, County Cork. Her eleven crew were rescued by a German brig.

== 12 February ==
List of shipwrecks: 12 February 1874
Ship	State	Description
Cardross	United Kingdom	The barque was driven ashore and wrecked at "Dinsey Head". She was on a voyage from Queenstown, County Cork to Liverpool, Lancashire with the loss of sixteen of her eighteen crew.
Clara	Germany	The brig caught fire in the Atlantic Ocean and was abandoned. Her crew were rescued by the full-rigged ship Seaford (United Kingdom). Clara was on a voyage from Liverpool to Demerara, British Guiana.
Hercules	Germany	The barque was wrecked at "Bogstown", County Cork, United Kingdom with the loss of eleven of her twelve crew. She was on a voyage from Barrow-in-Furness, Lancashire to Cardiff, Glamorgan, United Kingdom.
Minerva	United States	The ship was abandoned in the Atlantic Ocean. Her crew were rescued by John Zittleson (United Kingdom). Minerva was on a voyage from Long Island, New York to Halifax, Nova Scotia, Canada.
Oleg	Russia	The steamship was driven ashore and wrecked in the Black Sea. All on board were rescued.
Raleigh	United Kingdom	The barque sprang a leak and foundered 60 nautical miles (110 km) west of the Isles of Scilly. Her crew were rescued by the barque Fortune (France). Raleigh was on a voyage from Colombo, Ceylon to London.
Thomas and Elizabeth	United Kingdom	The schooner put in to Cork in a sinking condition. She was on a voyage from Liverpool, Lancashire to Nantes, Loire-Inférieure, France.

== 13 February ==
List of shipwrecks: 13 February 1874
Ship	State	Description
Abraham Lincoln	Italy	The barque was wrecked 3 nautical miles (5.6 km) east of Galley Head, County Cork, United Kingdom with the loss of six of her thirteen crew. She was on a voyage from Cardiff, Glamorgan, United Kingdom to Messina, Sicily.
Active	Russia	The barque was wrecked near Tralee, County Kerry, United Kingdom.
Castellian	Canada	The schooner caught fire and was abandoned in the Atlantic Ocean. Her six crew were rescued by the steamship Calabria (United Kingdom).
Dalkeith	United Kingdom	The schooner was wrecked at Durness, Sutherland.
Fanny Hilbery	United Kingdom	The ship was driven ashore and wrecked at Glandore, County Cork.
Romolo	United Kingdom	The schooner capsized at Falmouth, Cornwall and was beached. Her crew were rescued. She was on a voyage from Penryn to Falmouth. She was righted on 14 February.
Somerset	United Kingdom	The schooner was driven ashore at Marsden, County Durham. Her crew were rescued.
Supply	United Kingdom	The ship was driven ashore and severely damaged at Stairhaven, Wigtownshire. She was on a voyage from Arkhangelsk, Russia to Liverpool, Lancashire.
Wan Loong	China	The steamship capsized at Hong Kong with the loss of at least 100 lives. She was on a voyage from Hong Kong to Canton.

== 14 February ==
List of shipwrecks: 14 February 1874
Ship	State	Description
Ave Maria	United Kingdom	The barque ran aground on the Hastings Spit, in the Rangoon River. She was on a voyage from Rangoon, Burma to a European port. She was refloated and resumed her voyage.
Graig Merthyr	United Kingdom	The steamship was wrecked at "Almaida", 60 nautical miles (110 km) west of Alexandria, Egypt. Her crew survived. She was on a voyage from Swansea, Glamorgan to Alexandria.
Mary Moore	United Kingdom	The barque ran aground on the Chico Bank. She was on a voyage from Glasgow, Renfrewshire to Buenos Aires, Argentina. She was refloated on 17 February and taken in to Buenos Aires.
Theodora	Germany	The brigantine was driven ashore and wrecked at Hope Cove, Devon, United Kingdom with the loss of three of her six crew. Survivors were rescued by the Coastguard using a lifeboat. She was on a voyage from Barcelona, Spain to Falmouth, Cornwall, United Kingdom.
Unnamed	France	The schooner foundered off the Roches-Douvres Lighthouse, Côtes-du-Nord with the loss of all hands.

== 15 February ==
List of shipwrecks: 15 February 1874
Ship	State	Description
Anna	Norway	The ship departed from New York, United States for Rotterdam, South Holland, Netherlands. No further trace, presumed foundered with the loss of all hands.
Columbia	Peru	The ship was destroyed by fire at Hong Kong. Arson was suspected as the cause.
Ebenezer	Norway	The ship was wrecked on the Tisler Reefs. Her crew were rescued. She was on a voyage from London, United Kingdom to Christiania.
Haabet	Denmark	The schooner was wrecked on Anholt. She was on a voyage from Uusikaupunki, Grand Duchy of Finland to Hull, Yorkshire, United Kingdom.
Hiawatha	Netherlands	The ship departed from Rangoon, Burma for Zwijndrecht, South Holland. No further trace, presumed foundered with the loss of all hands.

== 16 February ==
List of shipwrecks: 16 February 1874
Ship	State	Description
Antigua	United Kingdom	The ship caught fire and was towed in to Ardrossan, Ayrshire. She was on a voyage from Greenock, Renfrewshire to Cuba.
Charles Gray	United Kingdom	The schooner was abandoned off Ouessant, Finistère, France. Her crew were rescued by the steamship Scorpio (United Kingdom).
Confidence	United Kingdom	The ship foundered in the Atlantic Ocean 100 nautical miles (190 km) north west of Tory Island, County Donegal. Her crew were rescued by Memory (United Kingdom).
Cyphrenes	United Kingdom	The steamship was driven ashore at St. Helen's, Isle of Wight. She was on a voyage from London to Australia. She was refloated in mid-February.
Ida E.	Canada	The barque was abandoned in the Atlantic Ocean. Her crew were rescued by the barque Fedalma (United Kingdom). Ida E. was on a voyage from Saint John, New Brunswick to Glasgow, Renfrewshire, United Kingdom.
San Miguel	Portugal	The barque was driven ashore and wrecked near Derrynane, County Kerry, United Kingdom with the loss of three of the 28 people on board. She was on a voyage from Liverpool, Lancashire, United Kingdom to Rio de Janeiro.
Sif	Denmark	The steamship was driven ashore at Östergarn, Sweden. Her crew were rescued. She was on a voyage from Reval, Russia to Lübeck, Germany.

== 17 February ==
List of shipwrecks: 17 February 1874
Ship	State	Description
Almira	United States	The barque was driven ashore on Vlieland, Zeeland, Netherlands. She was on a voyage from Baltimore, Maryland to Bremen, Germany.
Arracan	United Kingdom	The ship caught fire and was abandoned in the South China Sea. Her crew took to a boat; they were rescued on 27 February by the steamship City of Poonah (United Kingdom). Arracan was on a voyage from South Shields, County Durham to Bombay, India.
Garden Reach	United States	The ship was sighted off Cape Henry, Virginia whilst on a voyage from Baltimore, Maryland to Queenstown, County Cork, United Kingdom. No further trace, presumed foundered with the loss of all hands.
Magdalena	Norway	The barque was abandoned in the Atlantic Ocean. Her crew were rescued by Kalos (United States) and she was set afire. Magdalena was on a voyage from Jamaica to Queenstown.
Thessalia	Greece	The barque was wrecked near Capo Colonna, Italy. She was on a voyage from Cardiff, Glamorgan, United Kingdom to Constantinople, Ottoman Empire.
Zunge	Germany	The ship was driven ashore on Vlieland. Her crew were rescued. She was on a voyage from Bremen to Great Yarmouth, Norfolk, United Kingdom.

== 18 February ==
List of shipwrecks: 18 February 1874
Ship	State	Description
Almira	United States	The barque was driven ashore on Vlieland, Friesland, Netherlands. Her crew were rescued. She was on a voyage from Philadelphia, Pennsylvania to Bremen.
Catherine Campbell	United Kingdom	The ship was wrecked at Amble, Northumberland.
Gibson Craig	United Kingdom	The full-rigged ship was driven ashore and wrecked at Blakeney, Norfolk.
Hoppet	Sweden	The ship departed from the "Ydefjord" for Hull, Yorkshire. No further trace, presumed foundered with the loss of all hands.
Janet Dalgleish	United Kingdom	The barque sprang a leak and foundered in the Mediterranean Sea (39°23′N 5°47′E). Her crew were rescued by the steamship Caradoc (United Kingdom). Janet Dalgleish was on a voyage from Licata, Sicily Italy to Copenhagen, Denmark.
Johann Benjamin	Germany	The ship ran aground at Lowestoft, Suffolk, United Kingdom. She was on a voyage from Memel to Lowestoft. She was refloated and taken in to Lowestoft in a leaky condition.
Lapwing	United Kingdom	The ship was driven ashore at Säby, on the east coast of Öland, Sweden. She was on a voyage from Riga, Russia to Nantes, Loire-Inférieure, France.
Zunge	Germany	The sloop was driven ashore on Vlieland. Her crew were rescued. She was on a voyage from Bremen to Great Yarmouth, Norfolk, United Kingdom.

== 20 February ==
List of shipwrecks: 20 February 1874
Ship	State	Description
Chance	Germany	The barque was wrecked on the south coast of Formosa. At least two of her crew survived. She was on a voyage from Newcastle, New South Wales to Hong Kong.
Jessie Bannantyne	United Kingdom	The smack caught fire and was scuttled.
Leda	United Kingdom	The derelict schooner was towed in to the Isles of Scilly. She was on a voyage from Wilmington, Delaware, United States to London.
Maasluis	Netherlands	The full-rigged ship was driven ashore at Dungeness, Kent, United Kingdom. She was on a voyage from Batavia, Netherlands East Indies to Rotterdam, South Holland. She was refloated and taken in to Deal, Kent in a leaky condition.
Woosung	United Kingdom	The steamship was wrecked on the Holewell or Rolamee Reef. All on board were rescued. She was on a voyage from Calcutta, India to London.

== 21 February ==
List of shipwrecks: 21 February 1874
Ship	State	Description
Gem	United Kingdom	The schooner was driven ashore and wrecked west of Kinnaird Head, Aberdeenshire. She was on a voyage from Portmahomack, Ross-shire to West Hartlepool, County Durham.
Glide	United Kingdom	The ship was wrecked off the coast of County Wexford.
Industry	United Kingdom	The schooner sank off "Western Point". She was refloated.
Unnamed	France	The schooner collided with Ceres (United Kingdom) and was abandoned in the North Sea. Her crew were rescued by Ceres.

== 23 February ==
List of shipwrecks: 23 February 1874
Ship	State	Description
Childwall Abbey	United Kingdom	The full-rigged ship foundered in the Indian Ocean with the loss of four of her crew. Survivors took to a boat. They were rescued on 26 February by Lord Ashburton (United Kingdom). Childwall Abbey was on a voyage from Calcutta, India to London.
Gladstone	Norway	The barque was driven ashore in the Scheldt. She was on a voyage from Antwerp, Belgium to New York, United States. She was refloated on 27 February with the assistance of a number of tugs and taken in to Antwerp.
Pet	United Kingdom	The schooner departed from Padstow, Cornwall for Campbeltown, Argyllshire. Presumed subsequently foundered with the loss of all five crew, possibly on 25 February. Wreckage from the ship washed up at Southend, Argyllshire.
Walter Johnston	United Kingdom	The ship was wrecked at Port Ellen, Islay. Her crew were rescued. She was on a voyage from Bangor, Caernarfonshire to Fraserburgh, Aberdeenshire.

== 24 February ==
List of shipwrecks: 24 February 1874
Ship	State	Description
Iris	United Kingdom	The brig was driven ashore and wrecked at Waternish, Isle of Skye, Outer Hebrides. She sank on 19 March.
Macgregor	New South Wales	The ship was driven ashore at "Kandavan".
Milikano	Austria-Hungary	The brig was wrecked at Benghazi, Ottoman Tripolitania. She was on a voyage from Rodosto, Ottoman Empire to Malta.

== 25 February ==
List of shipwrecks: 25 February 1874
Ship	State	Description
Corinne	France	The steamship put in to St. Ives, Cornwall, United Kingdom in a sinking condition.
Geneze	Germany	The ship was driven ashore near New Romney, Kent, United Kingdom. She was refloated and resumed her voyage.
Good Hope	United Kingdom	The steamship was driven ashore at "Ras Metamer", Egypt. She was on a voyage from Calcutta, India to a British port.
Janes and Margarets	United Kingdom	The schooner was driven ashore and wrecked at Thurso, Caithness.
Jean Shearer	United Kingdom	The schooner was driven ashore and wrecked at Thurso.
Johanne Mathilde	United Kingdom	The barque ran aground on the Dunmore Bank and sank. She was refloated on 13 August and taken in tow for Cardiff, Glamorgan.
Lizzie	United Kingdom	The brigantine was run down and sunk off Land's End, Cornwall by the steamship Broomsgrove. Her crew were rescued.
Lord Morpeth	United Kingdom	The ferry struck the landing stage at Tranmere, Cheshire and sank.
Marie Elizabeth	France	The sloop ran aground on the Pole Sands. Her four crew were rescued by the Exmouth Lifeboat. She was on a voyage from Havre de Grâce, Seine-Inférieure to Teignmouth, Devon, United Kingdom.
Pioneer	United Kingdom	The schooner was driven ashore at Thurso. Her crew were rescued by rocket apparatus.
Rajah	United Kingdom	The full-rigged ship ran aground at Waterford. She was on a voyage from Calcutta to Liverpool, Lancashire. She was refloated.
Trelawney	United Kingdom	The barque was driven ashore at Queenstown, County Cork. She was later refloated.
William and Martha	United Kingdom	The schooner was driven ashore and wrecked at Thurso.
Winsome	United Kingdom	The ship was driven ashore at Burghead, Moray. She was on a voyage from Saint Petersburg, Russia to Burghead.
Whitwood	United Kingdom	The steamship ran aground in the River Ouse at Goole, Yorkshire.
Unnamed	Italy	The barque ran aground at Waterford and was wrecked.

== 26 February ==
List of shipwrecks: 26 February 1874
Ship	State	Description
Billow Queen	United Kingdom	The barque struck the Sand Hale, in the North Sea off the coast of Lincolnshire and was consequently beached south of Cleethorpes. Her crew were rescued. She was on a voyage from Sunderland, County Durham to Viana do Castelo, Portugal.
Brilliant	Germany	The barque was wrecked off Harwich, Essex, United Kingdom with the loss of all fifteen crew. She was on a voyage from Philadelphia, Pennsylvania, United States to Swinemünde.
Brisk	United Kingdom	The ship ran aground at Queenstown, County Cork. She was on a voyage from Ardrossan Ayrshire to Cárdenas, Cuba.
Concordia	Denmark	The ship was driven ashore and wrecked near Lunan, Forfarshire, United Kingdom. Her crew were rescued. She was on a voyage from Nordbye to a British port.
Cerbele	Sweden	The schooner was driven ashore and wrecked at Slains Castle, Aberdeenshire, United Kingdom with the loss of three of her nine crew. She was on a voyage rom Gothenburg to Alloa, Clackmannanshire, United Kingdom.
Elizabeth	United Kingdom	The ship was wrecked on Rathlin Island, County Donegal with the loss of all hands.
Emma Marie	Sweden	The schooner was driven ashore and wrecked at Westhaven, Forfarshire, United Kingdom. Her six crew were supposed to have been washed overboard before she came ashore. She was on a voyage from Halmstad to Hull, Yorkshire, United Kingdom.
Foldin	Norway	The schooner was abandoned in the Atlantic Ocean. Her crew were rescued by the steamship Algeria (United Kingdom). Foldin was on a voyage from Callao, Peru to Queenstown, County Cork, United Kingdom.
Garibaldi	United Kingdom	The schooner was wrecked at Lindisfarne, Northumberland with the loss of all hands.
Germania	Germany	The barque was driven ashore and wrecked at Newburgh, Aberdeenshire. She was on a voyage from Riga, Russia to South Shields, County Durham.
Griffin	United Kingdom	The barque was wrecked on Stronsay, Orkney Islands. Her crew survived. She was on a voyage from South Shields, County Durham to Livorno, Italy.
Ino	United Kingdom	The schooner was driven ashore in Clayshant Bay, Wigtownshire. Her crew survived. She was on a voyage from Runcorn, Cheshire to Paisley, Renfrewshire.
Itya	Russia	The schooner was driven ashore at Cruden Bay, Aberdeenshire, United Kingdom. Her crew were rescued. She was on a voyage from Riga to Grangemouth, Stirlingshire, United Kingdom.
Johanna Matilda	Norway	The barque was wrecked at Waterford, United Kingdom. Her crew were rescued by the pilot cutter Seagull (United Kingdom).
Maria Johanna	Netherlands	The schooner foundered in the North Sea off Slains Castle with the loss of all hands.
Nelson	United Kingdom	The ship was driven ashore at Bridlington, Yorkshire. Her crew were rescued.
No Joke	United Kingdom	The smack was wrecked on Stronsay.
Oxford	United Kingdom	The smack was driven ashore at Saltfleet, Lincolnshire with the loss of a crew member.
Rose	United Kingdom	The schooner was wrecked in Dundrum Bay with the loss of one of her five crew. Survivors were rescued by the Dundrum Lifeboat Reigate ( Royal National Lifeboat Institution).
Scottish Lass	United Kingdom	The ship was driven ashore and wrecked on the Isle of Whithorn, Wigtownshire. She was on a voyage from Donaghadee, County Down to Llanelly, Glamorgan.
Willie	United Kingdom	The schooner was driven ashore north of Carrickfergus, County Antrim. She was on a voyage from Liverpool, Lancashire to Belfast, County Antrim.

== 27 February ==
List of shipwrecks: 27 February 1874
Ship	State	Description
Amity	United Kingdom	The brig was driven ashore at Longhope, Orkney Islands. She was on a voyage from Limerick to Troon, Ayrshire.
Claudia	United Kingdom	The schooner was driven ashore at Moville, County Donegal. She was on a voyage from Cardiff, Glamorgan to Limerick.
Delight	United Kingdom	The brigantine was driven ashore at Moville.
Diadem	United Kingdom	The brigantine was driven ashore at Moville.
Heiress	United Kingdom	The ship ran aground near the South Lighthouse, in the Belfast Lough. She was on a voyage from Liverpool, Lancashire to Galveston, Texas, United States.
St George	Royal National Lifeboat Institution	The Stonehaven lifeboat, having launched to the aid of the barque Grace Darling (United Kingdom), but found not to be required, and unable to return home due to the conditions, then capsized whilst heading for Aberdeen harbour, with the loss of four of her ten crew. The lifeboat came ashore and was wrecked.
Wynaud	Flag unknown	The ship was wrecked at Hobart, Tasmania.
Unnamed	Flag unknown	The galiot foundered in the North Sea 40 nautical miles (74 km) off Buchan Ness, Aberdeenshire with the loss of all hands.

== 28 February ==
List of shipwrecks: 28 February 1874
Ship	State	Description
Argo	Norway	The barque foundered in the North Sea. Her crew were rescued by Twee Gebroeders (Netherlands). Argo was on a voyage from Bergen to Charlestown, Cornwall, United Kingdom.
Danmark	Denmark	The steamship was driven ashore. She was on a voyage from Memel, Germany to Rotterdam, South Holland, Netherlands. She was refloated.
Grace Darling	United Kingdom	The barque was driven ashore and wrecked at Rattray Head, Aberdeenshire with the loss of fourteen of her fifteen crew. She was on a voyage from North Shields, Northumberland to Swinemünde, Germany. Four crew of the Stonehaven Lifeboat were lost attempting a rescue.
Harbottle	United Kingdom	The ship caught fire in the Atlantic Ocean and was abandoned. Her crew were rescued. She was on a voyage from Liverpool, Lancashire to Buenos Aires, Argentina.
Jones Brothers	United Kingdom	The ship was abandoned in the Bay of Biscay. Her crew were rescued. She was on a voyage from Newport, Monmouthshire to Smyrna, Ottoman Empire.
Moses Day	United Kingdom	The full-rigged ship was abandoned off Mindanao, Spanish East Indies. Her crew were rescued.
Texa	United Kingdom	The schooner was driven ashore on Islay.
Thor	Sweden	The barque was abandoned in the Atlantic Ocean. Her crew were rescued by J. W. Settervall (Sweden). Thor was on a voyage from Jamaica to Queenstown, County Cork, United Kingdom.
Victoria	United Kingdom	The ship was driven ashore on Islay.

== Unknown date ==
List of shipwrecks: Unknown date in February 1874
Ship	State	Description
Adelina	United Kingdom	The ship was wrecked on the Ontario Reef, in the Raromata Passage before 27 February. Her crew were rescued She was on a voyage from South Shields, County Durham to Singapore, Straits Settlements.
Agil	Mexico	The ship was wrecked on Bermuda. She was on a voyage from Minatitlán to Falmouth, Cornwall, United Kingdom.
Amor	France	The ship ran aground on a rock at "Hillesund". She was on a voyage from Nykøbing Falster, Denmark to Dunkirk, Nord. She was refloated.
Ann Staniland	United Kingdom	The ship was driven ashore at Queenstown, County Cork between 2 and 10 February.
Auguste	Germany	The barque was abandoned in the Atlantic Ocean. Her crew were rescued. She was on a voyage from Liverpool, Lancashire, United Kingdom to Baltimore, Maryland, United States.
Behana Lithuania	Spain	The ship capsized with the loss of all but two of her crew. Survivors were rescued by the steamship Burgos (Flag unknown).
Bekham	United Kingdom	The sloop foundered off Fleetwood, Lancashire. Both crew were rescued by the fishing boat Christiania (United Kingdom). Bekham was on a voyage from Liverpool to Barrow-in-Furness, Lancashire.
Bloomer	United Kingdom	The ship foundered at sea before 17 February. Her crew were rescued. She was on a voyage from Pernambuco, Brazil to a Channel port.
Cambridge	United Kingdom	The steamship foundered in the North Sea 100 nautical miles (190 km) off Spurn Point, Yorkshire. Her crew were rescued. She was on a voyage from Sweden to London.
Carlo P.	United Kingdom	The ship was destroyed by fire off the coast of Brazil. Her crew survived. She was on a voyage from Rio de Janeiro, Brazil to Liverpool.
Caroline Lamont	United Kingdom	The ship was driven ashore and wrecked at San Antonio. She was on a voyage from Buenos Aires, Argentina to Valparaíso, Chile.
Charles	Canada	The barque was wrecked at Baltimore, County Cork, United Kingdom between 11 and 18 February with the loss of all but one of her crew.
Cherub	United Kingdom	The ship foundered in the Irish Sea after 7 February with the loss of all six crew. She was on a voyage from Troon, Ayrshire to Saint-Nazaire, Loire-Inférieure, France. Wreckage from the ship washed up at Ballycotton, County Cork.
Clyde	United Kingdom	The brig was driven ashore at Ballygrangis, County Wexford. She was on a voyage from Cardiff, Glamorgan to Waterford.
Colombo	Italy	The ship was wrecked at "Torre Chiarica".
Cronstadt	Canada	The ship ran aground at Baltimore, County Cork. She was on a voyage from New York, United States to Liverpool. She was refloated and resumed her voyage.
Dove	United Kingdom	The sloop was wrecked on Antigua.
Egyptien	France	The steamship collided with the steamship Tunis (United Kingdom) and sank off Civita Vecchia, Italy.
Eroe	Austria-Hungary	The barque was wrecked on the Antipata Rocks. She was on a voyage from Swansea, Glamorgan to Corfu, Greece.
Eunice	United Kingdom	The steamship ran aground near Falsterbo, Sweden. She was on a voyage from Danzig, Germany to London. She was refloated and taken in to Helsingør, Denmark in a leaky condition.
Eyerson	United Kingdom	The ship was driven ashore at Cape Florida, United States. She was later refloated and taken in to Key West, Florida, United States.
Firenze	United Kingdom	The steamship foundered in the Red Sea 78 nautical miles (144 km) off Suez, Egypt.
Francisko	Greece	The barque was wrecked at Imbros, Ottoman Empire. She was on a voyage from Dedeagac to Naples, Italy.
Franklin	United Kingdom	The brig departed from South Shields. No further trace, presumed foundered with the loss of all eight crew.
Gabrielle	France	The ship was abandoned in the Atlantic Ocean. She was discovered in a derelict condition 120 nautical miles (220 km) west of the Isles of Scilly, United Kingdom by Margaret Jane (United Kingdom) and taken in to Milford Haven, Pembrokeshire, United Kingdom.
George Buckley	United Kingdom	The ship departed from Goole, Yorkshire for Lagos, Lagos Colony. No further trace, presumed foundered with the loss of all hands.
Hannah	United Kingdom	The ship ran aground on the Nore. She was on a voyage from London to South Shields.
Harmony	United States	The ship was abandoned in the Atlantic Ocean. She was on a voyage from Matanzas, Cuba to Philadelphia, Pennsylvania.
Harriet William	United Kingdom	The ship was driven ashore and wrecked in Clonakilty Bay. She was on a voyage from Huelva, Spain to Llanelly, Glamorgan.
Hartstene	United States	The schooner was driven ashore at Ballycotton. She was refloated on 16 February and taken in to Queenstown.
Hélène	France	The schooner was driven ashore. Her four crew were rescued by the Winchelsea Lifeboat.
Henry	United Kingdom	The brigantine was wrecked at Ballinacourty, County Wexford. Her five crew were rescued by the Dungarvan Lifeboat.
Hope	United Kingdom	The brig was driven ashore at Blackwall, Middlesex. She was on a voyage from London to Montrose, Forfarshire.
Jane Shearer	United Kingdom	The ship was wrecked near Scrabster, Caithness.
Larcelle	France	The ship was wrecked on the Tuskar Rock. Her crew were rescued.
Laura A. Dodd	United States	The fishing schooner was lost at Miquelon Island. Crew saved.
Loyal Sam	United States	The full-rigged ship collided with the barquentine Portland (United States) and sank at Astoria, Oregon.
Margaretha	Germany	The brig was driven ashore on Skagen, Denmark. She was on a voyage from Rostock to Leith, Lothian, United Kingdom.
Pietro	Austria-Hungary	The brig was driven ashore at Çanakkale, Ottoman Empire. She was on a voyage from Liverpool to Constantinople, Ottoman Empire.
Regent	United Kingdom	The schooner sank in Loch Carron. She was on a voyage from Burntisland, Fife to Dublin. She was refloated in May and was taken in to Stornoway, Isle of Lewis, Outer Hebrides for repairs, arriving on 12 May.
Ridesdale	United Kingdom	The ship was driven ashore near Southampton, Hampshire. She was refloated.
Sandusky	United States	The ship was destroyed by fire at Mobile, Alabama.
Sedra	United Kingdom	The steamship departed from Malta in mid-February 1874 for Port Said, Egypt. She disappeared without further trace, and was presumed foundered with the loss of all 30 crew.
Thetis	Germany	The schooner ran aground at Aracaju, Brazil and was wrecked.
Tindell	United Kingdom	The ship was driven ashore near Kingsdown, Kent. She was on a voyage from South Shields, County Durham to Singapore, Straits Settlements.
Urbino	United Kingdom	The steamship was driven ashore in the Dardanelles. She was on a voyage from Trieste to Constantinople. She was refloated and resumed her voyage.
Valdivia	Chile	The steamship was wrecked at "Trumay" with the loss of two lives. She was on a voyage from Valdivia to "Trumay".
Ville d'Aurillac	United Kingdom	The steamship put in to Brest, Finistère on fire. She was on a voyavge from Bordeaux, Gironde to Porthcawl, Glamorgan.
Vincent de Paul	France	The ship foundered 4 nautical miles (7.4 km) south of Las Palmas, Canary Islands. Her crew were rescued. she was on a voyage from Sierra Leone to Marseille, Bouches-du-Rhône.
Virgen de los Angelos	Spain	The ship was lost. Her crew were rescued by the steamship Burgos (United Kingdom).
Vites	Austria-Hungary	The barque was abandoned at sea. Her ten crew were rescued by the barque San Miguel (Portugal). Vites was on a voyage from Galway to Cardiff.
Wenvoe	United Kingdom	The steamship was driven ashore near Saint-Nazaire, Loire-Inférieure, France. She was on a voyage from Cardiff to Saint-Nazaire. She was refloated on 3 February.
William Landreth	Canada	The ship was wrecked at Trepassey, Newfoundland Colony. She was on a voyage from Halifax, Nova Scotia to Saint John's, Newfoundland Colony.
