= 2017 McGrath Cup =

Tournament details
- Province: Munster
- Year: 2017

Winners
- Champions: Kerry (5th win)
- Manager: Éamonn Fitzmaurice
- Captain: Killian Young

Runners-up
- Runners-up: Limerick
- Manager: Billy Lee
- Captain: Iain Corbett

The 2017 McGrath Cup was an inter-county Gaelic football competition in the province of Munster, played by all six county teams. The final was won by Kerry.

== Format ==
The teams are drawn into two groups of three teams. Each team plays the other teams in its group once, earning 2 points for a win and 1 for a draw. The two group winners play in the final.

== Group stage ==
=== Group A ===
| Team | Pld | W | D | L | Pts | Diff |
|---|---|---|---|---|---|---|
| Kerry | 2 | 2 | 0 | 0 | 4 | +18 |
| Cork | 2 | 1 | 0 | 1 | 2 | +11 |
| Tipperary | 2 | 0 | 0 | 2 | 0 | –29 |

| 8 January 2017; 14:00; Round 1 | Kerry | 3-11 - 1-3 | Tipperary | Austin Stack Park; Referee: C Lane (Cork) |
| 8 January 2017; 14:00; Round 1 | M O'Sullivan 2-0, C Bambury 1-1 (1-0 pen), S O'Shea 0-3 (1f, 1 '45), C Geaney 0-2 (1f), T O'Sullivan 0-2, B O'Sullivan 0-1, M Flaherty 0-1, C Coffey 0-1. | Report | D Foley 1-0; K Fahey 0-2; J Kennedy 0-1. | Austin Stack Park; Referee: C Lane (Cork) |

| 11 January 2017; 19:30; Round 2 | Tipperary | 1-10 – 2-22 | Cork | Templetuohy; Referee: R Hickey (Clare) |
| 11 January 2017; 19:30; Round 2 | L Boland (0-4); L McGrath (0-3); A Moloney (1-0); D Foley, L Casey (0-1 each) | Report | N Coakley (2-3, 0-1 free); K Davis (0-6); B O’Driscoll, D O’Driscoll (0-3 each); R Deane, S Powter (0-2 each); C Dorman, I Maguire, P De Róiste (0-1 each) | Templetuohy; Referee: R Hickey (Clare) |

| 15 January 2017; 14:00; Round 3 | Cork | 1-9 - 1-13 | Kerry | Carigoon G.A.A Complex, Mallow; Referee: D O’Mahoney (Tipperary) |
| 15 January 2017; 14:00; Round 3 | N Coakley (1-5, 0-3 frees); G Murphy (0-3); B O’Driscoll (0-1) | Report | J O’Donoghue (1-3, 0-1 free); J Savage (0-6, 0-1 free); BJ Keane (0-2, 0-1 free); B O’Sullivan, T O’Sullivan (0-1 each). | Carigoon G.A.A Complex, Mallow; Referee: D O’Mahoney (Tipperary) |

=== Group B ===
| Team | Pld | W | D | L | Pts | Diff |
|---|---|---|---|---|---|---|
| Limerick | 2 | 2 | 0 | 0 | 4 | +6 |
| Clare | 2 | 1 | 0 | 1 | 2 | +1 |
| Waterford | 2 | 0 | 0 | 2 | 0 | –7 |

| 8 January 2017; 14:00; Round 1 | Clare | 1-10 - 0-8 | Waterford | Meelick; Referee: S Lonergan (Tipperary) |
| 8 January 2017; 14:00; Round 1 | E Cleary 1-4 (2f), J Malone 0-2, D Tubridy 0-1, M O’Neill 0-1, D Egan 0-1, C Russell 0-1. | Report | P Whyte 0-5 (4f), F O’Cuirrín 0-1, M Curry 0-1, C Murray 0-1. | Meelick; Referee: S Lonergan (Tipperary) |

| 11 January 2017; 19:30; Round 2 | Limerick | 2-13 – 2-9 | Clare | Rhebogue, Limerick; Referee: P O’Sullivan (Kerry) |
| 11 January 2017; 19:30; Round 2 | S O’Carroll (1-4, 2f 1 45), S McSweeney (0-4, 3 f), D Treacy (1-0), D Neville (0-2), D Daly, P White, B Donovan (0-1 each) | Report | K Sexton (0-6, 5f), E Cleary (1-2), C O’Dea 1-0, S McGrath 1-0. | Rhebogue, Limerick; Referee: P O’Sullivan (Kerry) |

| 15 January 2017; 14:00; Round 3 | Waterford | 0-7 - 0-9 | Limerick | Lemybrien, Waterford; Referee: J Bermingham (Cork) |
| 15 January 2017; 14:00; Round 3 | P Whyte (2fs), P Hurney 0-2 each, C Murray, J Veale, J McGrath 0-1 each. | Report | D Neville 0-5 (1f), C Sheehan, B Donovan, K Ryan, S McSweeney (f) 0-1 each. | Lemybrien, Waterford; Referee: J Bermingham (Cork) |

== Final ==
22 January 2017
3 p.m.
Final

| Kerry | 3-13 – 2-12 (a.e.t.) | Limerick |
|---|---|---|
| C Geaney 1-2 (2fs), D Moran 1-1, J O’Donoghue 0-4 (3fs), B O’Sullivan 1-0, J Lyne & B.J. Keane (2f) 0-2 each, P Murphy and M Geaney 0-1 each. | Report | I Corbett 1-2 (1-0 pen), S O’Carroll 1-1, D Neville 0-3, J Lee 0-2 (1f), S O’Dea, D Treacy, G Collins, and S McSweeney (f) 0-1 each. |

Gaelic Grounds, Limerick
Attendance: 2,010
Referee: A Kissane (Waterford)
