= 2011 Dr McKenna Cup =

Tournament details
- Province: Ulster
- Year: 2011

The 2011 Dr McKenna Cup was a Gaelic football competition played under the auspices of Ulster GAA. The tournament was won by Derry, their first McKenna title in 12 years. They defeated Tyrone in the final. The final was postponed due to the death of Tyrone manager Mickey Harte's brother Paddy Harte. The competition was also affected by the murder of Michaela McAreavey, Harte's daughter, on her honeymoon in Mauritius.

== See also ==
- 2011 O'Byrne Cup
- 2011 McGrath Cup
