= 2010 McGrath Cup =

Tournament details
- Province: Munster
- Year: 2010
- Trophy: McGrath Cup

The 2010 McGrath Cup is a Gaelic football competition played by the teams of Munster GAA. The competition differs from the Munster Senior Football Championship as it also features further education colleges and the winning team does not progress to another tournament at All-Ireland level. Originally, the preliminary round was due to be played on the first weekend on January. However, due to inclement weather and unplayable pitches, the matches were postponed several times, finally being played on 16 January 2010.

== McGrath Cup ==
Preliminary round 16 January 2010
Limerick	3-09
W.I.T	0-06
Tipperary	2-09
U.L.	1-09
Kerry	2-12
I.T. Tralee	1-11

Quarter-finals; 17 January 2010
C.I.T.	2-08
Limerick	0-11
U.C.C.	0-12
Clare	0-09
Tipperary	2-13
L.I.T.	2-06
Kerry	2-12
Waterford	3-05

Semi-finals; 22/24 January 2010
C.I.T.	1-10
U.C.C.	1-12
Tipperary	1-09
Kerry	0-13

Final; 30 January 2010
U.C.C.	0-09
Kerry	1-11

=== Preliminary round ===
16 January 2010

Limerick	3-09 - 0-06	W.I.T

16 January 2010

Tipperary	2-09 - 1-09	U.L.

16 January 2010

Kerry	2-12 - 1-11	I.T. Tralee

=== Quarter-finals ===
17 January 2010

Tipperary	2-13 - 2-06	L.I.T.
B Grogan 0-7 (5f), S Hahessy 0-4 (2f), P O'Dwyer, D Lynch 1-0 each, S Carey, B Coen 0-1 each.	Report	G Collins, C Daly 1-1 each, T Dalton 0-3 (2f), E O'Connor 0-1 (f).

Thurles
Referee: M. Condon
17 January 2010

Kerry	2-12 - 3-05	Waterford
K Donaghy 2-2, B Sheehan 0-6 (0-3fs), K O'Leary 0-2, S Scanlon and J O'Donoghue 0-1 each.	Report	M Donnelly 1-2 (1-0 pen, 0-2f), T Grey, C McGrath 1-0 each, B Wall 0-2 (0-2f), JJ Hutchinson 0-1.

Fitzgerald Stadium
Referee: D. O'Mahony
17 January 2010

C.I.T.	2-08 - 0-11	Limerick
BJ Walsh, 1-1 (1-1f), P Kerrigan, 1-0, S McCarthy, 0-3, C O'Driscoll, G Sayers, R Leahy (f), D Goulding (f) 0-1 each.	Report	I Ryan, 0-3 (0-3f), S Lavin, 0-2, S Gallagher, J Donovan, J Ryan, P Browne, S Kelly, J Mullane 0-1 each.

Foynes
Referee: K. O'Brien
17 January 2010

U.C.C.	0-12 - 0-09	Clare
D Kearney, D Goold (0-3f) 0-3 each, P Honohan, S Keily 0-2 each, D O'Callaghan, B O'Driscoll (0-1f) 0-1 each.	Report	D Tubridy 0-3 (0-2 f), A Clohessy 0-2, G Brennan, G Quinlan, L Healy, P Reidy 0-1 each.

Cooraclare
Referee: J. Lynch

=== Semi-finals ===
22 January 2010

C.I.T.	1-10 1-12	U.C.C.

C.I.T. Grounds
24 January 2010

Tipperary	1-09 0-13	Kerry

Fitzgerald Stadium

=== Final ===
30 January 2010

U.C.C.	0-09 1-11	Kerry

Austin Stack Park

== See also ==
- 2010 Dr McKenna Cup
