= 2011 McGrath Cup =

Tournament details
- Province: Munster
- Year: 2011
- Trophy: McGrath Cup

Winners
- Champions: Kerry (3rd win)

The 2011 McGrath Cup is a Gaelic football competition played by the teams of Munster GAA. The competition differs from the Munster Senior Football Championship as it also features further education colleges and the winning team does not progress to another tournament at All-Ireland level. Kerry retained the trophy after a 0-13 to 1-7 win against Clare at Dr Crokes grounds, Killarney, on 29 January.

== McGrath Cup ==
Preliminary round 9 January 2011
Tipperary	2-13
U.L.	1-13
Clare	1-13
U.C.C.	0-13
Cork	0-18
W.I.T.	0-05
Kerry	1-14
I.T. Tralee	1-13

Quarter-finals; 16 January 2011
Waterford	0-11
Tipperary	0-09
Clare	0-10
C.I.T.	0-09
Cork	3-11
Limerick	1-12
Kerry	0-11
L.I.T.	0-09

Semi-finals; 23 January 2011
Waterford	0-10
Clare	1-10
Cork	1-11
Kerry	2-11

Final; 29 January 2011
Clare	1-07
Kerry	0-13

=== Preliminary round ===
9 January 2011

Cork	0-18 - 0-05	W.I.T.

Páirc Uí Rinn, Cork
9 January 2011

Kerry	1-14 - 1-13	I.T. Tralee

Austin Stack Park, Tralee
9 January 2011

Tipperary	2-13 - 0-13	U.L.

Tipperary
9 January 2011

Clare	1-13 - 0-13	U.C.C.

Cooraclare

=== Quarter-finals ===
16 January 2011

Cork	3-11 - 1-12	Limerick

Gaelic Grounds, Limerick
16 January 2011

Kerry	0-11 - 0-09	L.I.T.

Austin Stack Park, Tralee
16 January 2011

Waterford	0-11 - 0-09	Tipperary

Walsh Park, Waterford
16 January 2011

C.I.T.	0-09 - 0-10	Clare

Cooraclare

=== Semi-finals ===
23 January 2011

Clare	1-10 - 0-10	Waterford

Ardmore
23 January 2011

Cork	1-11 - 2-11	Kerry

Killarney

=== Final ===
29 January 2011

Clare	1-07 - 0-13	Kerry

Killarney

== See also ==
- 2011 Dr McKenna Cup
