= 2026 McGrath Cup =

Gaelic football competition

Tournament details
- Province: Munster
- Date: 2–17 January 2026
- Teams: 6
- Defending champions: Cork

Winners
- Champions: Cork (12th win)
- Manager: John Cleary
- Captain: Daniel O'Mahony

Runners-up
- Runners-up: Kerry
- Manager: Jack O'Connor
- Captain: Tadhg Morley

Other
- Matches played: 7

The 2026 McGrath Cup is an inter-county Gaelic football competition in the province of Munster, played by all six county teams in January 2026.

Kerry player Joe O'Connor was opposed to the McGrath Cup taking place. Munster GAA ignored this and the fixtures were announced in November 2025, with the competition commencing on 2 January. Cork were the winners, defeating Kerry in Fitzgerald Stadium for the first time in 30 years.

== Format ==
The teams are drawn into two groups of three teams. Each team plays the other teams in its group once, earning 2 points for a win and 1 for a draw. The two group winners play in the final.

== Results ==
=== Group A ===
Pos	Team	Pld	W	D	L	PF	PA	PD	Pts	Qualification
1	Kerry	2	2	0	0	46	15	+31	4	Advance to final
2	Clare	2	1	0	1	33	27	+6	2	
3	Waterford	2	0	0	2	12	49	−37	0	

Source: Munster GAA

=== Group B ===
Pos	Team	Pld	W	D	L	PF	PA	PD	Pts	Qualification
1	Cork	2	1	0	1	44	30	+14	2	Advance to final
2	Limerick	2	1	0	1	24	30	−6	2	
3	Tipperary	2	1	0	1	25	33	−8	2	

Source: Munster GAA

=== Final ===
17 January 2026 Final	Kerry	0-15 (15) – (16) 0-16	Cork	Killarney
13:30 IWT (UTC±0)		(HT: 0-09 – 0-05)		Venue: Fitzgerald Stadium
		Report		Referee: Eoin Morrissey (Waterford); TV: Spórt TG4 YouTube
