= 2023 McGrath Cup =

Gaelic sports competition

Tournament details
- Province: Munster
- Date: 4–20 January 2023
- Teams: 6
- Defending champions: Kerry

Winners
- Champions: Cork (10th win)
- Manager: Kevin Walsh
- Captain: Brian Hurley

Runners-up
- Runners-up: Limerick
- Manager: Ray Dempsey
- Captain: Iain Corbett/Donal O'Sullivan

Other
- Matches played: 7

The 2023 McGrath Cup was an inter-county Gaelic football competition held in the province of Munster, played by all six county teams in January 2023. The Cork county football team was declared the winner of the match.

== Format ==
The teams are drawn into two groups of three teams. Each team plays the other teams in its group once, earning 2 points for a win and 1 for a draw. The two group winners play in the final.

== Results ==
=== Group A ===
Pos	Team	Pld	W	D	L	PF	PA	PD	Pts	Qualification
1	Cork	2	2	0	0	42	22	+20	4	Advance to final
2	Kerry	2	1	0	1	28	39	−11	2	
3	Clare	2	0	0	2	21	30	−9	0	

Updated to match(es) played on 15 January 2023. Source: Munster GAA

=== Group B ===
Pos	Team	Pld	W	D	L	PF	PA	PD	Pts	Qualification
1	Limerick	2	1	1	0	42	25	+17	3	Advance to final
2	Tipperary	2	1	1	0	36	23	+13	3	
3	Waterford	2	0	0	2	16	46	−30	0	

Updated to match(es) played on 14 January 2023. Source: Munster GAA

=== Final ===
20 January 2023 Final	Cork	0-19 (19) – (13) 2-07	Limerick	Mallow
19:30 IWT (UTC±00:00)		(HT: 0-07 – 1-03)		Venue: Mallow GAA Sports Complex Carrigoon
		Report		Referee: Brian Fleming (Kerry)
