= Joe McGrath (Gaelic games) =

Irish Gaelic football and hurling coach

Joe McGrath was an Irish Gaelic football and hurling coach, known for his All-Ireland success with Cork and for "revolutionising" training programs. He led Blackrock towards All-Ireland Senior Club Hurling Championship glory in 1973 and later led Cork to the All-Ireland U21 hurling success. He was also responsible for the McGrath Cup.

McGrath was joint coach of the Cork senior team that beat Kerry in the 1983 Munster SFC final.

He died in 2013 following a long illness, and was buried at St James Cemetery in Chetwynd; his funeral was attended by figures from the Gaelic Athletic Association and politics, including former GAA President Mick Loftus, broadcaster Mícheál Ó Muircheartaigh and then TD Micheál Martin.
