= 2010 Dr McKenna Cup =

Tournament details
- Province: Ulster
- Year: 2010

The 2010 Dr McKenna Cup was a Gaelic football competition played under the auspices of Ulster GAA. The tournament was won by Donegal. They defeated Tyrone in the final. Tyrone's Stephen O'Neill dislocated his elbow in the final.

== See also ==
- 2010 O'Byrne Cup
- 2010 McGrath Cup
