= Seán Meehan =

Irish Gaelic footballer

Personal information
- Native name: Seán Ó Miacháin (Irish)
- Born: 1999 (age 26–27) Cork, Ireland
- Occupation: Student

Sport
- Sport: Gaelic Football
- Position: Centre-back
Club
- Years: Club
- Kiskeam
Club titles
- Cork titles: 0
College
- Years: College
- Mary Immaculate College
College titles
- Sigerson titles: 0
Inter-county
Years	County	Apps (scores)
2020-	Cork	1 (0-00)
Inter-county titles
- Munster titles: 0
- All-Irelands: 1 (U20 2019)
- NFL: 0
- All Stars: 0

Seán Meehan (born 1999) is an Irish Gaelic footballer who plays for Cork Senior Championship club Kiskeam and at inter-county level with the Cork senior football team. He usually lines out as a centre-back.

In 2021, he was the sole Cork player to receive an All-Star nomination in part due to his performance in holding David Clifford scoreless in the Munster final.

== Career statistics ==
As of match played 8 November 2020.

Team	Year	National League			Munster		All-Ireland		Total	
Team	Year	Division	Apps	Score	Apps	Score	Apps	Score	Apps	Score
Cork	2020	Division 3	1	0-00	1	0-00	0	0-00	2	0-00
Career total			1	0-00	1	0-00	0	0-00	2	0-00

== Honours ==
=== Mary Immaculate College ===
- Trench Cup (1): 2018

=== Cork ===
- National Football League Division 3 (1): 2020
- All-Ireland Under-20 Football Championship (1): 2019
- Munster Under-20 Football Championship (1): 2019

Sporting positions
Preceded by Ian Maguire	Cork Senior Football Joint Captain; 2022; With: Brian Hurley	Incumbent
