= Dr Croke Cup (trophy) =

The Dr Croke Cup is a trophy awarded annually by the Gaelic Athletic Association to the county hurling team that wins the National Hurling League title. The trophy is named after Thomas Croke, a former Catholic Archbishop of Cashel and one of the first patrons of the GAA.
