= 2022 McGrath Cup =

Gaelic games competition in Ireland

Tournament details
- Province: Munster
- Date: 5–22 January 2022
- Teams: 6
- Defending champions: Limerick

Winners
- Champions: Kerry (6th win)
- Manager: Jack O'Connor
- Captain: Seán O'Shea

Runners-up
- Runners-up: Cork
- Manager: Keith Ricken

Other
- Matches played: 6

The 2022 McGrath Cup was an inter-county Gaelic football competition in the province of Munster, played by all six county teams. It was won by Kerry.

The opening game, between Clare and Waterford, was postponed, with Waterford unable to field a team due to COVID-19 cases and contacts.

== Format ==
The teams are drawn into two groups of three teams. Each team plays the other teams in its group once, earning 2 points for a win and 1 for a draw. The two group winners play in the final; if the final is a draw, it goes to a penalty shootout without extra time being played.

== Fixtures and results ==
=== Group A ===
Pos	Team	Pld	W	D	L	PF	PA	PD	Pts	Qualification
1	Cork	2	2	0	0	36	22	+14	4	Advance to final
2	Clare	2	1	0	1	10	15	−5	2	
3	Waterford	2	0	0	2	12	21	−9	0	

Updated to match(es) played on 11 January 2022. Source: Munster GAA
- Clare received a walkover from Waterford.

=== Group B ===
Pos	Team	Pld	W	D	L	PF	PA	PD	Pts	Qualification
1	Kerry	2	2	0	0	55	11	+44	4	Advance to final
2	Tipperary	2	1	0	1	20	40	−20	2	
3	Limerick	2	0	0	2	20	44	−24	0	

Updated to match(es) played on 12 January 2022. Source: Munster GAA

=== Final ===
22 January 2022 Final	Cork	0-11 (11) – (23) 2-17	Kerry	Killarney
14:00 GMT (UTC±0)		(HT: 0-05 – 2-09)		Venue: Fitzgerald Stadium
		Report		Referee: Niall Quinn (Clare)
