= 2018 McGrath Cup =

Tournament details
- Province: Munster
- Year: 2018

Winners
- Champions: Cork (9th win)
- Manager: Ronan McCarthy
- Captain: Jamie O'Sullivan

Runners-up
- Runners-up: Clare
- Manager: Colm Collins
- Captain: Cathal O'Connor

Other
- Matches played: 3

The 2018 McGrath Cup was a Gaelic football competition in the province of Munster, played by county teams.

Just three county teams completed in 2018 after the withdrawals of Tipperary, Limerick, and Kerry. Cork were the winners.

The cup was won by Cork after a 3–13 to 3–12 win in the final.

== Format ==
Three teams compete. Each team plays the other teams once, earning 2 points for a win and 1 for a draw. The top two teams play in the final.

== Group stage ==
30 December 2017; 2 p.m.	Clare	2-18 – 1-9	Waterford	Meelick; Referee: Pat O’Driscoll (Cork)
30 December 2017; 2 p.m.	Conor Finnucane (0-8, 4f), Eimhin Courtney (0-5), Gearóid O’Brien (1-1), Cathal O’Connor (1-0), Seán Collins (0-2), Kieran Malone (0-1), David Egan (0-1)	Report	Jason Curry (0-7, 3f), Conor Murray (1-0), Gavin Crotty (0-1), Mikey Kiely (0-1)	Meelick; Referee: Pat O’Driscoll (Cork)

7 January 2018; 2 p.m.	Waterford	0-7 – 2-18	Cork	Gold Coast Resort, Ballinacourty; Referee: S. Lonergan (Tipperary)
7 January 2018; 2 p.m.	J. Curry (0-3, 2f); M. Curry (0-2); G. Crotty, JJ Hutchinson (0-1 each)	Report	S. Sherlock (0-7, 2f); S. Powter (1-2); J. O’Rourke (0-4); P. Clancy (1-0); C. Vaughan, C. Dorgan (0-2 each); M. Collins (0-1)	Gold Coast Resort, Ballinacourty; Referee: S. Lonergan (Tipperary)

The final group game was cancelled, as Cork and Clare had already reached the final.

Team	Pld	W	D	L	Pts	Diff
Cork	1	1	0	0	2	+17
Clare	1	1	0	0	2	+12
Waterford	2	0	0	2	0	–29

== Final ==
13 January 2018; 4 p.m. Final	Cork	3-13 – 3-12	Clare	Mallow GAA Sports Complex, Mallow; Referee: Seamus Mulvihill (Kerry)
13 January 2018; 4 p.m. Final	Stephen Sherlock 2-3 (0-3f), Michael Hurley 0-4, Mark Collins 1-1, Cathal Vaughan 0-3 (0-1f), Daniel O’Callaghan, Cian Kiely 0-1 each	Report	Conor Finucane 0-5 (0-2f), Keelan Sexton, Gearóid O’Brien 1-1 each, Alan Sweeney 1-0, Eimhin Courtney 0-3, Cathal O’Connor (0-1 ’45), Darragh Bohannon 0-1 each	Mallow GAA Sports Complex, Mallow; Referee: Seamus Mulvihill (Kerry)
