= Brian Cuthbert =

Irish Gaelic footballer and manager (born 1975)

Personal information
- Native name: Brían Mac Cúibreith (Irish)
- Nickname: Cubby
- Born: 1975 (age 50–51) Bishopstown, Cork, Ireland
- Occupation: Primary school principal
- Height: 6 ft 0 in (183 cm)

Sport
- Sport: Gaelic football
- Position: Left corner-forward
Club
- Years: Club
- Bishopstown
Club titles
	Football	Hurling
Cork titles	0	0

Brian Cuthbert (born 1975) is an Irish former Gaelic footballer.

Born in Bishopstown, Cork, Cuthbert first arrived on the inter-county scene at the age of seventeen when he first linked up with the Cork minor team, before later lining out with the under-21 side. Although he never played in the senior grade, Cuthbert won an All-Ireland medal as captain of the minor team in 1993.

At club level, Cuthbert is a two-time championship medallist in the intermediate grade with Bishopstown as a hurler.

In retirement from playing Cuthbert became involved in team management and coaching. He began his career with various Cork development squads and the Cork Institute of Technology freshers team, before two years as manager of the Cork minor football team. He served as a senior selector under Conor Counihan while he also is heavily involved in coaching with the Bishopstown club side.

On 15 October 2013, Cuthbert was appointed manager of the Cork senior football team on a two-year term. He resigned from the position on 28 July 2015.

Cuthbert is principal of Scoil an Spioraid Naoimh, a primary school in Bishopstown.

== Honours ==
=== Player ===
Bishopstown

- Cork Intermediate Hurling Championship (2): 1992, 2006

Cork

- All-Ireland Minor Football Championship (1): 1993 (c)

=== Manager ===
Cork

- McGrath Cup (1): 2014
- Munster Minor Football Championship (1): 2010

Achievements
Preceded by Peter O'Sullivan (Meath)	All-Ireland MFC winning captain 1993	Succeeded by Jack Ferriter (Kerry)
Sporting positions
Preceded by	Cork Minor Football Manager; 2009–2011	Succeeded by Ephie Fitzgerald
Preceded by Conor Counihan	Cork Senior Football Manager; 2013–2015	Succeeded by Peadar Healy
