= 2012 McGrath Cup =

Gaelic football competition

Tournament details
- Province: Munster
- Year: 2012
- Trophy: McGrath Cup

Winners
- Champions: Cork (6th win)
- Manager: Conor Counihan
- Captain: Ray Carey

The 2012 McGrath Cup is a Gaelic football competition played by the teams of Munster GAA. The competition differs from the Munster Senior Football Championship as it also features further education colleges and the winning team does not progress to another tournament at All-Ireland level. The competition was won by Cork, defeating Tipperary in the final by seven points.

== McGrath Cup ==
Preliminary round 8 January 2012
Waterford	0-14
I.T. Tralee	2-14
Clare	0-18
U.L.	1-08
Tipperary	2-13
L.I.T.	3-08

Quarter-finals; 15 January 2012
I.T. Tralee	2-05
C.I.T.	2-16
Clare	0-07
Cork	2-14
Tipperary	4-16
W.I.T.	0-06
Limerick	0-10
U.C.C.	1-19

Semi-finals; 22 January 2012
C.I.T.	0-07
Cork	2-17
Tipperary	1-15
U.C.C.	0-10

Final; 29 January 2012
Cork	0-13
Tipperary	0-06

=== First round ===
8 January 2012

Waterford	2-14 - 0-14	I.T. Tralee

Waterford
8 January 2012

Clare	0-18 - 1-08	U.L.

Doonbeg
8 January 2012

Tipperary	2-13 - 3-08	L.I.T.

Clonmel

=== Quarter-finals ===
15 January 2012

C.I.T.	2-16 - 2-05	I.T. Tralee

C.I.T. Sportsgrounds, Cork
15 January 2012

Cork	2-14 - 0-07	Clare

Páirc Uí Rinn, Cork
15 January 2012

W.I.T.	0-06 - 4-16	Tipperary

Clonmel
15 January 2012

Limerick	0-10 - 1-19	U.C.C.

Limerick

=== Semi-finals ===
22 January 2012

Cork	2-17 - 0-07	C.I.T.

Páirc Uí Rinn, Cork
22 January 2012

Tipperary	1-15 - 0-10	U.C.C.

Clonmel

=== Final ===
29 January 2012

Cork	0-13 - 0-06	Tipperary
	Report

Clonmel

== See also ==
- 2012 Dr. McKenna Cup
