= 2016 McGrath Cup =

Tournament details
- Province: Munster
- Year: 2016

Winners
- Champions: Cork (8th win)
- Manager: Peadar Healy
- Captain: Daniel Goulding

Runners-up
- Runners-up: Clare
- Manager: Colm Collins
- Captain: Gary Brennan

The 2016 McGrath Cup was an inter-county Gaelic football competition in the province of Munster, played by the six county teams. It was won by Cork.

== Format ==
The teams are drawn into two groups of three teams. Each team plays the other teams in its group once, earning 2 points for a win and 1 for a draw. The two group winners play in the final.

== Results ==
=== Group A ===
Team	Pld	W	D	L	Pts	Diff
Clare	2	2	0	0	4	+4
Kerry	2	1	0	1	2	+3
Tipperary	2	0	0	2	0	–7

=== Group B ===
Team	Pld	W	D	L	Pts	Diff
Cork	2	2	0	0	4	+21
Waterford	2	1	0	1	2	–14
Limerick	2	0	0	2	0	–7

=== Finals ===
22 January 2016
Final

Clare	1-9 — 1-15	Cork
	Report

Mallow GAA Complex
Attendance: 804
