= 2014 McGrath Cup =

Tournament details
- Province: Munster
- Year: 2014
- Trophy: McGrath Cup

Winners
- Champions: Cork
- Manager: Brian Cuthbert
- Captain: Michael Shields

The 2014 McGrath Cup was a Gaelic football competition played by the teams of Munster GAA. The competition differs from the Munster Senior Football Championship as it also features further education colleges and the winning team does not progress to another tournament at All-Ireland level. Kerry were the defending champions after defeating Tipperary in the 2013 final.

Tipperary, Limerick, Waterford and Clare refused to take part in the 2014 competition in protest at the Munster Council’s decision to seed the 2014 Munster Football Championship and keep Cork and Kerry on separate sides of the draw.

The competition was won by Cork who defeated Kerry in the final by four points on 19 January in Mallow.

== Teams ==
The following Third Level Colleges took part in 2014

- University College Cork (UCC)
- Tralee IT
- University of Limerick (UL)
- Cork Institute of Technology (CIT)
- Limerick Institute of Technology (LIT)
- Mary Immaculate College (Mary I)

The following counties took part in 2014

- Cork
- Kerry

== Match Results ==
=== Quarter-finals ===
5 January

- Kerry 0-17 Tralee IT 0-8
- CIT 5-17 Mary I 2-6
- Cork 3-22 LIT 0-7
- UL 5-18 UCC 4-16

=== Semi-finals ===
12 January

- Kerry 2-12 CIT 0-13
- Cork 6-16 UL 0-7

=== Final ===
19 January

| Kerry | 0-10 - 1-11 | Cork |
|---|---|---|
| B Sheehan (2fs, 1 '45), B J Keane (1f) 0-3 each, J Lyne 0-2, D Walsh, S O'Callaghan 0-1 each. | Report | D Goulding 0-4 (2fs), J Hayes 1-0, P Kerrigan 0-2, A Walsh, D O'Connor (f), A O'Sullivan, M Shields, M Collins (f) all 0-1 each |

Mallow
Referee: D O'Mahony (Tipperary)
