= Peadar Healy =

Irish Gaelic footballer and manager

Personal information
- Native name: Peadar Ó hÉalaithe (Irish)
- Born: 1963 (age 62–63) Ballyvourney, County Cork, Ireland
- Occupation: Garda

Sport
- Sport: Gaelic Football
- Position: Centre-forward
Clubs
- Years: Club
- Naomh Abán; Valentia Young Islanders
Club titles
- Cork titles: 0

Peadar Healy (born 1963) is a former Irish Gaelic football manager and former player. He was the manager of the Cork senior team from 2015 to 2017

Born in Ballyvourney, County Cork, Healy was introduced to Gaelic football at a young age. He enjoyed success at schools' level while simultaneously enjoying championship successes in minor and under-21 divisional grades with the Naomh Abán club. Healy also won a championship medal in the junior grade.

Healy made his debut on the inter-county scene at the age of sixteen when he first linked up with the Cork minor team. An All-Ireland medallist in this grade, he also won an All-Ireland medal as a non-playing substitute with the under-21 team.

In retirement from playing Healy has become involved in team management and coaching. As a selector and coach with the Cork senior team, he helped guide the team to the All-Ireland title in 2010. He also worked as a coach with club sides O'Donovan Rossa and Dr. Croke's. Healy was appointed manager of the Cork senior team on 17 October 2015.

== Playing career ==
=== Inter-county ===
Healy first played for Cork as a member of the minor team on 3 May 1980. He scored 0-7 from centre-forward on his debut in a 2-18 to 0-4 Munster quarter-final defeat by Clare. Cork's championship campaign ended without success that year, however, Healy was eligible for the grade once again in 1981. He won a Munster medal that year following a narrow 0-9 to 1-5 defeat of Kerry. On 20 September 1981 Cork faced Derry in the All-Ireland decider. A hat-trick of goals by Colm O'Neill powered Cork to a 4-9 to 2-7 victory and an All-Ireland Minor Football Championship medal for Healy.

By this stage Healy was also a member of the Cork under-21 team. He was an unused substitute in 1980 as Cork secured the Munster and All-Ireland titles following respective victories over Kerry and Dublin.

== Coaching career ==
=== Cork manager ===
On 17 October 2015 Healy was appointed manager of the Cork senior football team. He claimed his first silverware as manager when Cork defeated Clare to take the McGrath Cup in early 2016. After defeat to Mayo in extra time of the 2017 All Ireland championship qualifiers, Healy told his players he would be stepping down as manager of Cork senior footballers.

== Career statistics ==
=== Manager ===
As of match played 3 April 2016.

Team	From	To	McGrath Cup				League				Munster				All-Ireland				Total				
Team	From	To	G	W	D	L	G	W	D	L	G	W	D	L	G	W	D	L	G	W	D	L	Win %
Dublin	17 October 2015	Present	3	3	0	0	7	3	0	4	0	0	0	0	0	0	0	0	10	6	0	4	60%

== Honours ==
=== Player ===
Naomh Abán

- Cork Junior Football Championship (1): 1988

Cork

- All-Ireland Under-21 Football Championship (1): 1980 (sub)
- Munster Under-21 Football Championship (1): 1980 (sub)
- All-Ireland Minor Football Championship (1): 1981
- Munster Minor Football Championship (1): 1981

=== Selector ===
Cork

- All-Ireland Senior Football Championship (1): 2010
- Munster Senior Football Championship (3): 2008, 2009, 2012
- National Football League (Division 1) (3): 2010, 2011, 2012
- National Football League (Division 2) (1): 2009

=== Manager ===
Cork

- McGrath Cup (1): 2016

Sporting positions
Preceded by Brian Cuthbert	Cork Senior Football Manager; 2015-2017	Succeeded by Ronan McCarthy
