= 2009 All-Ireland Under-21 Football Championship =

Gaelic football competition

Championship details

All-Ireland Champions
- Winning team: Cork (11th win)
- Captain: Colm O'Neill

All-Ireland Finalists
- Losing team: Down

Provincial Champions
- Munster: Cork
- Leinster: Dublin
- Ulster: Down
- Connacht: Mayo

The 2009 All-Ireland Under-21 Football Championship was the 46th staging of the All-Ireland Under-21 Football Championship since its establishment by the Gaelic Athletic Association in 1964.

Kerry entered the championship as defending champions, however, they were defeated by Cork in the Munster quarter-final.

On 4 May 2009, Cork won the championship following a 1-13 to 2-9 defeat of Down in the All-Ireland final. This was their 11th All-Ireland title overall and their first in two championship seasons.

== Results ==
=== All-Ireland Under-21 Football Championship ===
Semi-finals

18 April 2009 Semi-final	Down	1-15 - 2-09	Mayo	Pearse Park, Longford

19 April 2009 Semi-final	Cork	1-10 - 1-09	Dublin	Semple Stadium, Thurles

Final

4 May 2009 Final	Cork	1-13 - 2-09	Down	O'Moore Park, Portlaoise
