= Ballinacourty =

Townland in County Waterford, Ireland

Coordinates: 52.085°N 7.56694°W

Ballinacourty Baile na Cúirte
- Townland
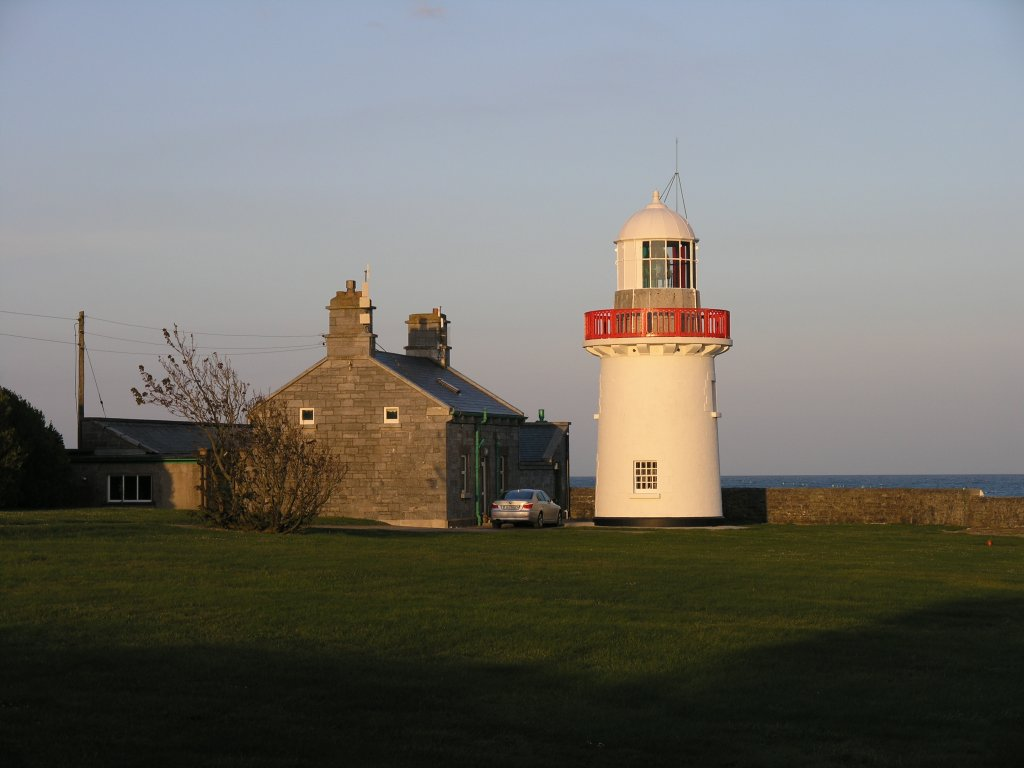
- Ballinacourty lighthouse
- Interactive map of Ballinacourty
- Country: Ireland
- Province: Munster
- County: Waterford

Ballinacourty, officially Ballynacourty (Irish: Baile na Cúirte, meaning 'town of the court or Courtown'), is a rural area and townland on the southern coast of Ireland near Dungarvan, County Waterford.

== Transport ==
A magnesite factory in the area was served by the last remaining part of the Waterford-Mallow railway line until the late 1980s.

Ballinacourty lighthouse, which stands at the entrance to Dungarvan Harbour, was built in 1858.

== Sport ==
The local Gaelic Athletic Association club is Abbeyside/Ballinacourty GAA. The club plays both hurling and gaelic football and competes in both senior codes in the county.
