= McGrath Cup =

Gaelic football competition

- Current season or competition: 2026 McGrath Cup
- Irish: Corn Mhic Craith
- Code: Gaelic football
- Founded: 1981
- Region: Munster (GAA)
- Trophy: McGrath Cup
- No. of teams: 6
- Title holders: Cork (12th title)
- Most titles: Clare (13 titles)
- TV partner(s): Clubber; YouTube
- Official website: munster.gaa.ie/fixtures/mcgrath-cup-football/

The McGrath Cup is a Gaelic football competition played each January in Munster. The competition was introduced for the benefit of the weaker counties, but in the mid-1990s, Kerry and Cork were included. Several college teams previously participated but, from 2016, only county teams compete.

== Trophy ==
Joe McGrath donated the trophy to the Munster Council in 1981 for the promotion of Gaelic football.

== List of finals ==
| Year | Winner | | Runners-up | |
| Year | Team | Score | Team | Score |
|---|---|---|---|---|
| 2026 | Cork | 0-16 | Kerry | 0-15 |
| 2025 | Not held due to fixture congestion | | | |
| 2024 | Cork | 1-14 (pens.) | Kerry | 1-14 |
| 2023 | Cork | 0–19 | Limerick | 2–07 |
| 2022 | Kerry | 2–17 | Cork | 0–11 |
| 2021 | Competition cancelled due to the impact of the COVID-19 pandemic on Gaelic games | | | |
| 2020 | Limerick | 0–20 | Cork | 0–16 |
| 2019 | Clare | 1–09 | Cork | 0–09 |
| 2018 | Cork | 3–13 | Clare | 3–12 |
| 2017 | Kerry | 2–13 (Note: After extra time.) | Limerick | 2–12 |
| 2016 | Cork | 1–15 | Clare | 1–09 |
| 2015 | Waterford | 3–12 | UCC | 1–09 |
| 2014 | Cork | 1–11 | Kerry | 0–10 |
| 2013 | Kerry | 1–12 | Tipperary | 1–05 |
| 2012 | Cork | 0–13 | Tipperary | 0–06 |
| 2011 | Kerry | 0–13 | Clare | 1–07 |
| 2010 | Kerry | 1–11 | University College Cork | 0–09 |
| 2009 | Cork | 1–13 | University of Limerick | 0–06 |
| 2008 | Clare | 1–06 | Limerick | 0–08 |
| 2007 | Cork | 1–08 | Limerick | 0–07 |
| 2006 | Cork | 1–09 | Kerry | 0–06 |
| 2005 | Limerick | 2–10 | Cork Institute of Technology | 1–03 |
| 2004 | Limerick | 1–09 | Clare | 1–06 |
| 2003 | Tipperary | 1–09 | Clare | 1–08 |
| 2002 | Clare | 2–13 | Waterford | 2–11 |
| 2001 | Limerick | 0–13 | Tipperary | 1–07 |
| 2000 | Clare | 3–01 | London | 0–04 |
| 1999 | Cork | 2–13 | London | 0–11 |
| 1998 | Cork | 2–20 | London | 0–08 |
| 1997 | Clare | 2–19 | London | 2–11 |
| 1996 | Kerry | 5–17 | London | 0–06 |
| 1995 | Clare | | London | |
| 1994 | Clare | 1–15 | London | 2–03 |
| 1993 | Tipperary | 2–13 | London | 0–04 |
| 1992 | Clare | | Limerick | |
| 1991 | Limerick | | Tipperary | |
| 1990 | Clare | | London | |
| 1989 | Tipperary | | London | |
| 1988 | London | 2–08 | Waterford | 1–06 |
| 1987 | Limerick | | Waterford | |
| 1986 | Clare | | London | |
| 1985 | Limerick | 0–11 | London | 2–03 |
| 1984 | Clare | | Tipperary | |
| 1983 | Clare | 1–08 | London | 0–05 |
| 1982 | Clare | 2–08 | Tipperary | 1–06 |
| 1981 | Waterford | 5–02 | Clare | 2–07 |

== Roll of honour ==
| # | Team | Wins | Runners-Up | Years won | Years Runners-Up |
|---|---|---|---|---|---|
| 1 | Clare | 13 | 6 | 1982, 1983, 1984, 1986, 1990, 1991, 1994, 1995, 1997, 2000, 2002, 2008, 2019 | 1981, 2003, 2004, 2011, 2016, 2018 |
| 2 | Cork | 12 | 3 | 1998, 1999, 2006, 2007, 2009, 2012, 2014, 2016, 2018, 2023, 2024, 2026 | 2019, 2020, 2022 |
| 3 | Limerick | 7 | 5 | 1985, 1987, 1991, 2001, 2004, 2005, 2020 | 1992, 2007, 2008, 2017, 2023 |
| 4 | Kerry | 6 | 4 | 1996, 2010, 2011, 2013, 2017, 2022 | 2006, 2014, 2024, 2026 |
| 5 | Tipperary | 3 | 6 | 1989, 1993, 2003 | 1982, 1984, 1991, 2001, 2012, 2013 |
| 6 | Waterford | 2 | 3 | 1981, 2015 | 1987, 1988, 2002 |
| 7 | London | 1 | 13 | 1988 | 1983, 1985, 1986, 1989, 1990, 1993, 1994, 1995, 1996, 1997, 1998, 1999, 2000 |
| 8 | UCC | 0 | 2 | — | 2010, 2015 |
| 8 | CIT | 0 | 1 | — | 2005 |
| 8 | UL | 0 | 1 | — | 2009 |
