= UCC GAA =

University sports club in Cork, Ireland

University College Cork G.A.A.
- C.L.G. Coláiste na hOllscoile, Corcaigh
- County: Cork
- Nickname: The College
- Colours: Red and Black
- Grounds: The Mardyke

Playing kits
Standard colours

Senior Club Championships
	All Ireland	Munster champions	Cork champions
Football:	0	2	10
Hurling:	0	0	2

UCC is a football and hurling club associated with University College Cork. UCC teams play in the Cork Senior Football Championship and Cork Senior Hurling Championship as well as the two main third-level competitions namely the Sigerson Cup in football, the Fitzgibbon Cup in hurling and the Ashbourne Cup in camogie. They also competed against inter-county sides in the pre-season McGrath Cup (football) and Waterford Crystal Cup (hurling). The piratical skull and crossbones logo on the team shirt, which first appeared on the rugby team of what was then known as Queen’s College Cork (composed mostly of medical students, hence the bones) was appropriated in the mid-1910s by the GAA clubs, and in 1929 by the UCC hockey club.

== Honours ==
Competition	Wins	Years won
Sigerson Cup	23	1913, 1914, 1919, 1922, 1925, 1927, 1943, 1946, 1951, 1952, 1965, 1966,1969,1970,1972,1988,1994, 1995, 2011, 2014, 2019, 2023
Fitzgibbon Cup	43	1913, 1914, 1920, 1922, 1925, 1928, 1929, 1930, 1931, 1933, 1937,1939, 1940, 1947, 1955, 1956, 1957, 1959, 1962, 1963, 1966, 1967, 1971, 1972, 1976, 1981, 1982, 1983, 1984, 1985, 1986, 1987, 1988, 1990, 1991, 1996, 1997, 1998, 2009, 2012, 2013, 2019, 2020
Ashbourne Cup	32	1919, 1922, 1923, 1924, 1925, 1926, 1927, 1929, 1931, 1932, 1934, 1936, 1937, 1944, 1945, 1951, 1963, 1965, 1967, 1972, 1973, 1974, 1975, 1976, 1977, 1985, 1996, 1998 2000, 2000, 2002, 2003,
O'Connor Cup	3	1988, 1990, 2012
Cork Senior Football Championship	10	1920, 1927, 1928, 1960, 1963, 1964, 1969, 1973, 1999, 2011
Cork Senior Hurling Championship	2	1963, 1970
Munster Senior Club Football Championship	3	1970, 1973, 1999
Cork Senior Camogie Championship	1	1936
Munster Senior Club Camogie Championship	1	1974

== Notable players ==
Football

- Johnny Buckley
- Maurice Fitzgerald
- Paul Galvin
- Moss Keane
- Billy Morgan
- Séamus Moynihan
- Ken O'Halloran
- Jamie O'Sullivan

Hurling

- Pat Heffernan
- Joe Deane
- James "Cha" Fitzpatrick
- Ray Cummins
- Nicky English
- Tommy Walsh
- William Egan
