= 2010 National Football League (Ireland) =

Gaelic football competition

League details
- Dates: 6 February – 25 April 2010
- Teams: 33

League champions
- Winners: Cork (6th win)

League runners-up
- Runners-up: Mayo
- Captain: Trevor Mortimer

Other division winners
- Division 2: Armagh
- Division 3: Sligo
- Division 4: Limerick

The 2010 National Football League known for sponsorship reasons as the Allianz National Football League was the 79th staging of the National Football League (NFL), an annual Gaelic football tournament for the Gaelic Athletic Association county teams of Ireland. The League began on Saturday 6 February 2010. Thirty-two Gaelic football county teams from Ireland, plus London, participated. On 25 April, Cork defeated Mayo by 1–17 to 0–12 to win their sixth league title and their third in a row.

== Format ==
=== League structure ===
The 2010 format of the National Football League was a system of four divisions. The top three divisions consisted of 8 teams, and Division 4 contained nine teams. Each team played every other team in its division once, either home or away. 2 points were awarded for a win and 1 for a draw.

=== Tie-breaker ===
If only two teams were level on points:

- The team that won the head-to-head match was ranked first
- If this game was a draw, points difference (total scored minus total conceded in all games) was used to rank the teams
- If points difference was identical, total scored was used to rank the teams
- If still identical, a play-off was required

If three or more teams were level on points, points difference was used to rank the teams.

=== Finals, promotions and relegations ===
The top two teams in Division 1 contested the 2010 NFL final. The top two teams in divisions 2, 3 and 4 were promoted, and contested the finals of their respective divisions. The bottom two teams in divisions 1, 2 and 3 were relegated.

== Division 1 ==
=== Division 1 ===
Advanced to NFL final Automatic relegation to Division 2

Team	Pld	W	D	L	F	A	Diff	Pts
Mayo	7	6	0	1	9–86	5–78	+20	12
Cork	7	5	0	2	9–93	9–86	+7	10
Dublin	7	5	0	2	9–77	7–72	+11	10
Kerry	7	3	0	4	6–89	7–77	+9	6
Galway	7	3	0	4	7–97	8–104	−10	6
Monaghan	7	2	0	5	8–92	9–100	−11	4
Derry	7	2	0	5	5–85	8–87	−11	4
Tyrone	7	2	0	5	7–84	7–99	−15	4

- Cork were placed ahead of Dublin as they won the head-to-head match between the teams (20 March at Páirc Uí Rinn: 2–13 to 2–6).
- Kerry were placed ahead of Galway as they won the head-to-head match between the teams (14 March at Pearse Stadium: 2–16 to 1–9).
6 February 2010
Round 1

Derry	1–18 – 1–12	Tyrone
G O’Kane (0–1), C Kielt (0–1), M Lynch (0–2), J Kielt (0–6, 6f), A Mc Cartney (0–1), E Bradley (0–4, 2f, 1 ’45), R Wilkinson (1–2), D Mullan (0–1).		A Cassidy (0–1), K Coney (0–1), C Cavanagh (1–0), M Penrose (0–4, 3f), T McGuigan (0–4, 2f), E McCusker (0–1).

Páirc an Cheiltigh, Derry
Attendance: 6000 (est.)
Referee: P McEnaney (Monaghan)

6 February 2010
Round 1

Mayo	2–14 – 1–10	Galway
E Varley 1–1, M Ronaldson 0–4 (0-4f), T Mortimer 1–0, K McLoughlin, A Moran 0–2 each, P Gardiner, T Parsons, D Vaughan, A O'Shea, R McGarrity 0–1 each		M Meehan 1–3 (0-3f), N Joyce 0–3 (0-2f), S Armstrong, M Martin (0-2f) 0–2 each

McHale Park, Castlebar
Referee: Marty Duffy (Sligo)

7 February 2010
Round 1

Kerry	1–10 – 1–12	Dublin
P O’Connor 0–5 (0-3f, 0–1 ‘45), BJ Walsh 1–1, P Galvin 0–4		P Flynn 1–2, E Fennell 0–3, B Kelly (0-2f), K McManamon 0–2 each, A Hubbard, B Brogan (0-1f), M MacAuley 0–1 each

Fitzgerald Stadium, Killarney
Attendance: 6000 (est.)
Referee: R Hickey (Clare)

7 February 2010
Round 1

Monaghan	3–12 – 3–13	Cork
T Freeman (0-1f), D Hughes 1–2 each, V Corey 1–1, C McManus 0–4 (2f), P Finlay 0–3 (2f)		P Kerrigan 2–2; P Kelly 1–1; D Goulding 0–3; P O'Neill, D O'Connor 0–2 each, P Kissane, A Walsh, J Hayes 0–1 each

Scotstown
Referee: D Coldrick (Meath)

13 February 2010
Round 2

Cork	1–12 – 0–12	Kerry
D Goulding 0–7 (1f), P Kerrigan 1–2, P O'Flynn, D O'Connor (1f), M Shields 0–1 each		BJ Keane 0–3 (1f), BJ Walsh (1f), P O'Connor (2f), D Walsh, D O'Callaghan 0–2 each, D O'Sullivan 0–1

Páirc Uí Rinn, Cork
Attendance: 4800 (est)
Referee: M Deegan (Laois)

13 February 2010
Round 2

Dublin	1–11 – 0–7	Derry
K McManamon 1–1, B Brogan 0–3 (0-2f), E Fennell 0–2, R McConnell, M MacAuley, B Kelly, D Nelson, B McManamon 0–1 each.		J Kielt 0–4 (0-3f), M Lynch 0–2 (0-2f), A McLaughlin 0–1.

Parnell Park, Donnycarney Referee: P Hughes (Armagh)

14 February 2010
Round 2

Tyrone	1–11 – 1–12	Mayo
E McCusker 1–1, T McGuigan 0–3 (0-1f), A Cassidy 0–2, K Hughes, C Cavanagh, K Coney, P Harte, C McCullagh 0–1 (0-1f) each		M Ronaldson 1–7 (0-2f, 1pen), E Varley 0–2 (0-2f), K McLoughlin, T Parsons, A Moran 0–1 each

Healy Park, Omagh
Referee: J White (Donegal)

14 February 2010
Round 2

Galway	1–20 – 1–14	Monaghan
N Joyce 1–4 (0-3f), M Meehan 0–6 (0-5f), S Armstrong 0–5 (0-2f), F Breathnach 0–2, N Coleman, P Conroy, G Bradshaw 0–1 each		C McManus 0–5 (0-1f), P Finlay 0–4 (0-3f, 0–1 sideline), B McKenna 1–0, T Freeman 0–3 (0-1f), D Malone, V Corey 0–1 each.

Pearse Stadium, Galway
Referee: D Fahy (Longford)

6 March 2010
Round 3

Cork	1–19 – 1–17	Galway
P O'Neill 1–2, C O'Neill (0-3f), D O'Connor 0–4 each, P Kelly 0–3 (0-2f), P O'Flynn, D Goulding, 0–2 each, P Kerrigan, P Kissane 0–1		N Joyce 0–7 (0-5f), M Meehan 0–6 (0-3f), G Sice 1–0, S Armstrong (0–1 '45), C de Paor, D Reilly, D Cummins 0–1 each

Páirc Uí Rinn, Cork
Referee: M Condon (Waterford)

7 March 2010
Round 3

Mayo	1–08 – 1–9	Dublin
E Varley 1–3 (0-3f), A Freeman 0–2 (2f), A Moran 0–2 (1f), S O'Shea 0–1		B Brogan 1–0, R McConnell 0–2, A Hubbard, K McManamon, K Bonner, E Fennell, M McAuley, P Flynn, C Keaney 0–1 each

McHale Park, Castlebar
Referee: P Fox (Westmeath).

7 March 2010
Round 3

Kerry	0–15 – 1–9	Derry
C Cooper 0–5 (0-5f), D Moran, K Donaghy 0–3 each, B Sheehan (0-1f), K Young, D O'Callaghan, Declan O'Sullivan 0–1 each		Paddy Bradley 0–5 (0-5f), E Bradley 1–1, G O'Kane, F Doherty, B Mullan 0–1 each

Austin Stack Park, Tralee
Referee: G Kineavey (Galway).

7 March 2010
Round 3

Monaghan	1–14 – 0–16	Tyrone
P Finlay 0–7 (0-6f), C McManus 0–4 (0-4f), T Freeman 1–1, D Clerkin, R Woods 0–1 each		M Penrose 0–5 (0-5f), T McGuigan 0–4 (0-4f), R Mulgrew, O Mulligan 0–2 each, K Hughes, E McCusker, D Carlin 0–1 each

Inniskeen
Referee: Martin Higgins (Fermanagh)

13 March 2010
Round 4

Tyrone	3–9 – 0–16	Cork
T McGuigan 1–1, C Cavanagh, R Mellon 1–0 each, O Mulligan 0–3, M Penrose 0–2 (2f), D Harte, C Gormley, S O'Neill 0–1 each		C O'Neill 0–5 (3f), D Goulding, P Kerrigan 0–3 each, P O'Neill 0–2, P Kissane, D O'Connor, J Hayes 0–1 each

Healy Park
Referee: D Coldrick (Meath)

13 March 2010
Round 4

Dublin	2–11 – 1–9	Monaghan
B Brogan 1–6 (0-3f), K McMenamon 1–0, E Fennell, R McConnell, A Hubbard, B McMenamon, D Magee 0–1 each		T Freeman 1–0, C McManus 0–3 (0-3f), H McElroy, R Woods 0–2 each, D Hughes, P Finlay (0-1f) 0–1 each

Parnell Park
Referee: M Deegan (Laois)

13 March 2010
Round 4

Derry	1–12 – 2–12	Mayo
E Bradley 1–2, P Bradley 0–4 (0-2f), G O'Kane, L Moore (0-2f) 0–2 each, C Kielt, M Lynch 0–1 each		A Moran 1–2, A O'Shea 1–1, A Varley, A Dillon (0-3f) 0–3 each, T Mortimer 0–2, C Barrett 0–1

Celtic Park
Referee: C Reilly (Meath)

14 March 2010
Round 4

Galway	1–9 – 2–16	Kerry
M Meehan 1–4 (0-3f, 0–1 '45), P Conroy 0–3, D Blake, F Breathnach 0–1		C Cooper 1–7 (0-5f), Declan O'Sullivan 1–1, D O'Callaghan, B Sheehan (0-1f) 0–3 each, A Maher, A O'Connell 0–1 each

Pearse Stadium, Salthill
Referee: M Duffy (Sligo)

20 March 2010
Round 5

Cork	2–13 – 2–6	Dublin
D Goulding 1–4 (0-2f), P Kerrigan 1–2, C Sheehan, D Kavanagh, P Kelly 0–2 each, A O'Connor 0–1		B Brogan 1–2 (0-1f), K McManamon 1–1, E Fennell, A Hubbard, C Keaney (0-1f) 0–1 each

Páirc Uí Rinn
Referee: P McEnaney (Monaghan)

21 March 2010
Round 5

Galway	1–15 – 0–14	Tyrone
M Clancy 1–3, E Concannon 0–4 (0-2f), J Bergin, G Sice 0–2 each, D Blake, P Conroy, C Bane, D Blake 0–1 each		M Penrose 0–8 (0-6f), C McCullagh, R Mellon, A Cassidy, S Cavanagh, T McGuigan (0-1f), C Cavanagh 0–1 each

Tuam
Referee: Marty Duffy (Sligo)

21 March 2010
Round 5

Monaghan	1–16 – 0–12	Derry
C McManus 0–8 (0-4f), T Freeman 1–1, P Finlay 0–3 (0-2f), C Walshe 0–2, D Malone, H McElroy 0–1 each		Paddy Bradley 0–4 (0-1f), E Bradley (0-1f), M Bateson 0–2 each, M Lynch, E Wilkinson, J Kielt, J Diver 0–1 each

Scotstown
Referee: P Hughes (Armagh)

21 March 2010
Round 5

Kerry	1–10 – 1–12	Mayo
K O'Leary 1–2, C Cooper (0-2f), B Sheehan (0-2f, 0–1 '45) 0–4 each		C Mortimer, E Varley (0-3f) 0–4 each, T Parsons 1–0, A Dillon 0–2 (0-2f), A Moran (0–1 '45), T Mortimer 0–1 each

Austin Stack Park, Tralee
Referee: David Coldrick (Meath)

27 March 2010
Round 6

Dublin	0–14 – 1–14	Galway
E Concannon 0–8 (0-5f), F Breathnach 1–0, N Joyce 0–3 (0-2f), G Sice 0–2, G Bradshaw 0–1		B Brogan 0–11 (0-7f), C O'Sullivan, K Bonner, C Keaney (0-1f) 0–1 each

Parnell Park
Referee: C Reilly (Meath)

27 March 2010
Round 6

Tyrone	1–11 – 1–10	Kerry
M Penrose 0–4 (0-3f), C Cavanagh 1–0, S Cavanagh, O Mulligan (0-1f), T McGuigan (0-1f) 0–2 each, K Coney 0–1		Declan O'Sullivan 1–0, D Moran (0-1f) 0–3, Darran O'Sullivan, C Cooper (0-1f), D Walsh 0–2 each, K Donaghy 0–1

Healy Park
Referee: Padraig Hughes (Armagh)

27 March 2010
Round 6

Derry	0–14 – 2–9	Cork
Paddy Bradley 0-07, (0-05f), Eoin Bradley 0-02, Michael Bateson 0-01, Fergal Doherty 0-01, Joe Diver 0-01, Charlie Kielt 0-01		Fintan Gould 1-01, John Hayes 1-00(pen), Daniel Goulding 0–03 (0-02f), Paul Kerrigan 0-02, Noel O’Leary 0-01; Patrick Kelly 0-01, Aidan Walsh 0-01

Celtic Park, Derry
Attendance: 1500
Referee: Marty Duffy (Sligo)

28 March 2010
Round 6

Mayo	2–12 – 0–15	Monaghan
D Vaughan 1–1, A O'Shea 1–0, A Dillon (1f), M Ronaldson, E Varley (1f) 0–2 each, C Mortimer, C Barrett, K McLoughlin, A Moran, T Parsons 0–1 each		P Finlay 0–8 (7f), C McManus 0–3 (1f), D Hughes 0–2 (1f, 1 45), S Gollogly, T Freeman 0–1 each

McHale Park
Referee: R Hickey (Clare)

11 April 2010
Round 7

Kerry	1–16 – 1–12	Monaghan
B Sheehan 1–4 (2f), K Donaghy, P Galvin 0–3 each, Darran O'Sullivan 0–2, C Cooper, D Bohan, T O Se, K O'Leary 0–1 each		C McManus 1–3 (2f ), R Woods, D Hughes (1f), P Finlay (1f) 0–2 each, C Hanratty, D Clerkin, D Freeman all 0–1 each

Kerry
Referee: M Condon (Waterford)

11 April 2010
Round 7

Cork	0–11 – 0–16	Mayo
D O'Connor 0–3 (0-3f), C O'Neill (2f), J Hayes, F Goold 0–2 each, K MacMahon, C Sheehan 0–1		A Dillon (3f), C Mortimer (2f) 0–4 each, A O'Shea, A Moran 0–2 each, C Barrett, D Vaughan, M Ronaldson, S O'Shea 0–1 each

Cork
Referee: G Ó Conámha (Galway)

11 April 2010
Round 7

Tyrone	1–11 – 2–14	Dublin
S Cavanagh 0–5 (3f), M Penrose 1–1, K Coney 0–2, P Harte, K Hughes, B McGuigan 0–1 each		B Brogan 0–8 (2f), A Brogan 1–1, N Corkery 1–0, K McManamon 0–2 (1sl), M MacAuley, D Henry, E Fennell 0–1 each

Omagh
Referee: D Fahy (Longford)

11 April 2010
Round 7

Galway	1–12 – 2–13	Derry
N Joyce 0–5 (0-4f), E Concannon 0–3 (0-3f), G O'Donnell 1–0, P Conroy 0–2, J Bergin, M Clancy 0–1 each		J Kielt 0-5f, D Mullan 1–2, SL McGoldrick 1–1, M Lynch 0–3 (2f), R Wilkinson, J Diver 0–1 each

Pearse Stadium, Salthill

==== Final ====
25 April 2010
4:00 p.m.

Cork	1–17 – 0–12 Report	Mayo
Daniel Goulding 1–5; Donncha O'Connor 0–5; Ciarán Sheehan 0–2; Noel O'Leary, Alan O'Connor, Aidan Walsh, Paddy Kelly, Paul Kerrigan 0–1 each		Conor Mortimer 0–6; Alan Dillon 0–3; Seamus O'Shea 0–2; Andy Moran 0–1

Croke Park, Dublin
Referee: Pádraig Hughes (Armagh)

== Division 2 ==
Compete in Division 2 final and automatic promotion to Division 1 Automatic relegation to Division 3

Team	Pld	W	D	L	F	A	Diff	Pts
Down	7	6	1	0	6–94	3–65	+38	13
Armagh	7	5	0	2	6–94	5–60	+37	10
Donegal	7	4	0	3	7–71	5–75	+2	8
Meath	7	4	0	3	4–76	5–76	−3	8
Laois	7	3	0	4	3–89	9–76	−5	6
Kildare	7	3	0	4	3–80	5–80	−6	6
Tipperary	7	2	1	4	9–65	5–88	−11	5
Westmeath	7	0	0	7	8–58	9–107	−52	0

- Donegal were placed ahead of Meath as they won the head-to-head match between the teams (27 March at Ballybofey: 1–12 to 0–10).
- Laois were placed ahead of Kildare as they won the head-to-head match between the teams (27 March at O'Moore Park: 0–13 to 0–9).
6 February 2010
Round 1

Meath	2–8 – 0–13	Armagh
S Bray 1–1; J Queeney 1–1; D Bray 0–3 (0-2f); C O'Connor, C Ward (0-1f), G Reilly 0–1 each)		AS McDonnell 0–6 (0–3 f); R Henderson, C Vernon 0–2 each; J Feeney, F Moriarty, A Kernan 0–1 (0-1f) each

Navan
Referee: G O Conamha (Galway)

6 February 2010
Round 1

Laois	1–13 – 1–11	Tipperary
MJ Tierney 1–3 (0-1f); D Kingston 0–3 (0-1f); P Lawlor, C Og Greene 0–2 each; N Donoher, D Miller, B Quigley 0–1 each		B Grogan 0–5 (0-4f); P Austin 1–1; C Sweeney 0–3; G Hannigan, P Acheson 0–1 each

Navan
Referee: Pat Fox (Westmeath)

7 February 2010
Round 1

Kildare	0–8 – 1–16	Down
R Kelly 0–3, K Ennis 0–2, G White, P O'Neill, J Kavanagh 0–1 each		P McComiskey 1–4 (0-2f), A Rodgers, M Clarke (0-3f) 0–3 each, J Clarke 0–2, C Garvey, D Hughes, S Kearney, C Laverty 0–1 each

St Conleth's Park, Newbridge
Referee: D Fahy (Longford)

7 February 2010
Round 1

Westmeath	0–9 – 1–13	Donegal
D Glennon 0–5 (1f), P Greville 0–2 (2f), G Hoey, R Doolan 0–1 each		C McFadden 0–6 (4f), K Cassidy 1–0, M Murphy 0–3 (2f, 43), A Hanlon 0–2, C Dunne, D Walsh 0–1 each

Cusack Park, Mullingar
Referee: C Reilly (Meath)

13 February 2010; 19:30; Round 2	Down	0–12 – 0–8	Meath	Páirc Esler
13 February 2010; 19:30; Round 2	J Clarke 0–4, P McComiskey 0–3 (3f), M Clarke 0–2 (1f), A Rodgers 0–2, C Maginn 0–1	Report	C Ward 0–4 (2f), D Bray 0–2 (2f), N Crawford, M Ward 0–1 each	Páirc Esler

13 February 2010; 19:30; Round 2	Kildare	1–17 – 0–8	Tipperary	Thurles
13 February 2010; 19:30; Round 2	J Kavanagh 0–7 (4f), K Ennis 0–4 (3f), K Donnelly 1–0, P O'Neill 0–3, D Whyte (1 '45), D Earley, K Cribbin 0–1 each	Report	C Sweeney 0–3 (2f), B Grogan (1f), S Hahessy 0–2 each, J Cagney 0–1.	Thurles

13 February 2010; 19:30; Round 2	Donegal	3–11 – 0–5	Laois	Ballyshannon; Referee: Michael Duffy (Sligo)
13 February 2010; 19:30; Round 2	M Murphy 1–3 (3f); C McFadden 0–4 (2f); C Dunne, J Keaney 1–0 each; S Griffin 0–2; B Monaghan, D Walsh 0–1 each	Report	D Kingston 0–2; D Carroll, C Begley, MJ Tierney (1f) 0–1 each	Ballyshannon; Referee: Michael Duffy (Sligo)

13 February 2010; Round 2	Armagh	2–19 – 0–8	Westmeath	Crossmaglen; Referee: M Higgins (Fermanagh)
13 February 2010; Round 2	S McDonnell 1–9, F Moriarty 1–0, A Kernan (0-1f), T Kernan (0-2f), G Swift 0–2 each, C Vernon, R Henderson, J Feeney, C Watters 0–1 each	Report	D Glennon 0–4 (0-2f), P Greville 0–3 (0-2f), D Duffy 0–1	Crossmaglen; Referee: M Higgins (Fermanagh)

6 March 2010; 14:30; Round 3	Laois	0–12 – 0–13	Armagh	Portlaoise; Referee: R Hickey (Clare)
6 March 2010; 14:30; Round 3	M Tierney 0–3 (0-3f), D Kingston 0–2 (0-1f), M Timmons, D Strong, C Healy, C Begley, B Sheehan, P Lawlor, P O'Leary 0–1 each	Report	S McDonnell 0–7 (0-2f, 0–1 '45), R Henderson 0–3, A Kernan (0-1f), J Lavery, M Mackin 0–1 each	Portlaoise; Referee: R Hickey (Clare)

6 March 2010; 19:30; Round 3	Down	0–14 – 1–11	Tipperary	Páirc Esler; Referee: J Curley (Meath)
6 March 2010; 19:30; Round 3	M Clarke 0–5 (0–4 f), C Laverty, J Clarke 0–3 each, P McComiskey 0–2 (0-2f), C Maginn 0–1	Report	B Coen 1–1 (0-1f), C Sweeney 0–5 (0-4f), B Brogan 0-2f, C Aylward 0–2, P Austin 0–1	Páirc Esler; Referee: J Curley (Meath)

6 March 2010; 19:30; Round 3	Meath	1–12 – 2–8	Westmeath	Páirc Tailteann; Referee: J White (Donegal)
6 March 2010; 19:30; Round 3	D Bray 0–5 (0-1f), S Bray 0–4, J Sheridan 1–0, J Queeney 0–2 (0-2f), S Kenny 0–1	Report	P Bannon 1–3 (1–0 pen, 0-2f), M Ennis 1–2, P Greville 0–2 (0-1f), P Gilsenan 0–1	Páirc Tailteann; Referee: J White (Donegal)

7 March 2010; 14:30; Round 3	Kildare	1–17 – 1–9	Donegal	Newbridge; Referee: M Collins (Cork)
7 March 2010; 14:30; Round 3	Doyle 0–6 (0-2f), K Donnelly 0–3, G White 1–0, P O'Neill, K Ennis (0-2f) 0–2 each, D Earley, D Flynn, W Heffernan, H Lynch 0–1 each	Report	M Murphy 0–4 (0-3f); S Griffen 1–0, C McFadden 0–2(0-1f), L McLoone, A Hanlon, D Walsh 0–1 each	Newbridge; Referee: M Collins (Cork)

13 March 2010; 7:30 p.m. Round 4	Donegal	0–11 – 0–13	Down	Ballybofey; Referee: P McEnaney (Monaghan)
13 March 2010; 7:30 p.m. Round 4	B Coulter, M Clarke 0–3 (0-2f) each, J Clarke 0–2, K McKernan, A Rodgers, D Hughes, P McComiskey, P Fitzpatrick 0–1 each	Report	C McFadden 0–4 (0-1f), M Murphy 0–3 (0-2f), N Gallagher 0–2, A Thompson, M Maguire 0–1 each	Ballybofey; Referee: P McEnaney (Monaghan)

14 March 2010; 2:30 p.m. Round 4	Armagh	0–12 – 0–5	Kildare	Crossmaglen; Referee: Joe McQuillan (Cavan)
14 March 2010; 2:30 p.m. Round 4	S McDonnell (0-2f), S Forker 0–4 each, A Kernan (0-1f), P Kernan, M McNamee, R Austin 0–1 each	Report	J Doyle 0–2 (fs), G White, D Flynn, J Kavanagh 0–1 each	Crossmaglen; Referee: Joe McQuillan (Cavan)

14 March 2010; 2:30 p.m. Round 4	Tipperary	1–9 – 0–10	Meath	Thurles; Referee: T Lynch (Kerry)
14 March 2010; 2:30 p.m. Round 4	B Grogan 1–5 (1–0 pen, 0-4f, 0–1 sideline), P Austin 0–2, C Sweeney (0-1f), B Coen 0–1 each	Report	C Ward 0–5 (0-1f, 0-1 sideline), S O'Rourke 0–2, S McAnarney, P Byrne and S Bray 0–1 each	Thurles; Referee: T Lynch (Kerry)

14 March 2010; 2:30 p.m. Round 4	Westmeath	3–8 – 0–24	Laois	Mullingar; Referee: V Neary (Mayo)
14 March 2010; 2:30 p.m. Round 4	P Bannon 1–3 (1–0 pen, 3f); P Greville 1–2 (1f); M Flanagan 1–0; G Flanagan, T Warburton, M Ennis 0–1 each	Report	MJ Tierney 0–13 (6f); D Kingston 0–4; N Donoher 0–3; C Begley, P O'Leary, C Rogers, K Meaney 0–1 each	Mullingar; Referee: V Neary (Mayo)

20 March 2010; 19:30; Round 5	Down	1–13 – 1–6	Armagh	Páirc Esler; Referee: M Sludden (Tyrone)
20 March 2010; 19:30; Round 5	B Coulter 1–1, M Poland 0–3 (2f), A Rodgers 0–3 (1f), J Clarke 0–2 (1f), M Clarke 0–2 (1f), C Maginn 0–1, D Hughes 0–1	Report	S McDonnell 1–3 (1f, 1pen), G Swift 0–2, F Moriarity 0–1	Páirc Esler; Referee: M Sludden (Tyrone)

21 March 2010; 19:30; Round 5	Meath	0–13 – 1–9	Laois	Páirc Tailteann, Navan; Referee: J McKee (Armagh)
21 March 2010; 19:30; Round 5	C Ward 0–3 (2f, 1 '45'), O Lewis 0–3, J Sheridan 0–3 (1 sideline), S O'Rourke 0–2, P Byrne 0–1, M Burke 0–1	Report	B Sheehan 1–1, D Kingston 0–4 (4f), M John Tierney 0–1, C Begley 0–1, C Rogers 0–1, P O'Leary 0–1	Páirc Tailteann, Navan; Referee: J McKee (Armagh)

21 March 2010; 7:30 p.m. Round 5	Tipperary	2–5 – 1–9	Donegal	Thurles; Referee: M Collins (Cork)
21 March 2010; 7:30 p.m. Round 5	R Costigan 1–1, S Hahessy 1–0 (45), B Grogan 0-2f, P Austin & B Coen 0–1 each	Report	M Murphy 0–7 (5f), S Griffin 1–0, C McFadden 0–2 (1f)	Thurles; Referee: M Collins (Cork)

21 March 2010; 2:30 p.m. Round 5	Kildare	1–11 – 2–7	Westmeath	Newbridge; Referee: A Mangan (Kerry)
21 March 2010; 2:30 p.m. Round 5	J Doyle 0–6 (0-5f), E Callaghan 1–1, M O'Flaherty 0–2, A Rainbow, R Sweeney 0–1 each	Report	M Flanagan, P Bannon (1–0 pen, 0-2f) 1–2 each, G Flanagan, D Harte, M Ennis 0–1 each	Newbridge; Referee: A Mangan (Kerry)

27 March 2010; 7:30 p.m. Round 6	Laois	0–13 – 0–9	Kildare	O'Moore Park, Portlaoise; Referee: P Fox (Westmeath)
27 March 2010; 7:30 p.m. Round 6	MJ Tierney 0–5 (3f), D Kingston (1f), C Rogers 0–2 each, P McMahon, C Begley, K Meaney, D Strong 0–1 each	Report	J Doyle 0–5 (4f), J Kavanagh 0–2, D Earley, D Flynn 0–1 each	O'Moore Park, Portlaoise; Referee: P Fox (Westmeath)

27 March 2010; 7:30 p.m. Round 6	Donegal	1–12 – 0–10	Meath	Ballybofey; Referee: M Sludden (Tyrone)
27 March 2010; 7:30 p.m. Round 6	M Murphy 1–6 (0-2f), C McFaddden 0–2 (0-2f), M Maguire, K Cassidy, C Dunne, DWalsh 0–1 each	Report	J Sheridan, M Burke 0–2 each, CO'Connor, S O'Rourke, M Ward, C Ward, P Byrne, J Queeney (0-1f) 0–1 each	Ballybofey; Referee: M Sludden (Tyrone)

27 March 2010; 7:30 p.m. Round 6	Armagh	1–15 – 2–8	Tipperary	Crossmaglen; Referee: M Higgins (Fermanagh)
27 March 2010; 7:30 p.m. Round 6	S McDonnell 0–6 (0-6f), A Kernan 0–4 (0-4f), G Swift 1–0, A Mallon, J Lavery, S Forker, K Dyas, J Feeney (0-1f) 0–1 each	Report	B Grogan 2–4 (0-2f), T Dalton 0–2 (0-2f), C Aylward, B Coen 0–1 each	Crossmaglen; Referee: M Higgins (Fermanagh)

27 March 2010; 7:30 p.m. Round 6	Westmeath	0–8 – 2–15	Down	Cusack Park; Referee: G Ó Conamha (Galway)
27 March 2010; 7:30 p.m. Round 6	M Flanagan 0–3 (0-2f, 0–1 sideline), J Smyth 0–2, P Greville (0-1f), G Hoey, G Flanagan 0–1 each	Report	M Poland 1–4, (0–3 f), A Rodgers 1–3 (0–1 '45), R Murtagh, J Clarke 0–3 each, D Hughes, C Maginn 0–1 each	Cusack Park; Referee: G Ó Conamha (Galway)

11 April 2010; Round 7	Armagh	2–16 – 0–6	Donegal	Letterkenny; Referee: J McQuillan
11 April 2010; Round 7	S McDonnell 1–4 (0-1f), F Moriarty 1–0, C Vernon, B Mallon 0–2 each, A Mallon, P Duffy, C McKeever, M Mackin, J Feeney, R Henderson, A Kernan, R Clarke (0-1f) 0–1 each	Report	A Hanlon (0-1f), M Murphy (0-2f) 0–2 each, K Kavanagh, S Griffen (0-1f) 0–1 each	Letterkenny; Referee: J McQuillan

11 April 2010; Round 7	Down	2–11 – 1–13	Laois	Páirc Esler; Referee: J White (Donegal)
11 April 2010; Round 7	M Clarke 1–5 (4f), J Clarke 1–3 (1f), K Duffin, R Murtagh, A Carr 0–1 each	Report	D Kingston 1–7 (5f), C Healy, C Bogle, K Meaney, P Callaghan, R Munnelly, C Bergin 0–1 each	Páirc Esler; Referee: J White (Donegal)

11 April 2010; Round 7	Tipperary	2–13 – 1–10	Westmeath	Semple Stadium; Referee: S Doyle (Wexford)
11 April 2010; Round 7	B Grogan 1–7 (0-3f), P Austin 0–3, G Hannigan 1–0, B Fox 0–2, E Kearney 0–1	Report	P Gilsenan 1–1, F Wilson 0–3 (0-1f), G Flanagan 0–2 (0–2 '45s), D McDermott, S O'Donoghue, D Duffy, P Greville (0-1f) 0–1 each	Semple Stadium; Referee: S Doyle (Wexford)

11 April 2010; Round 7	Meath	1–15 – 0–13	Kildare	Páirc Tailteann; Referee: E Kinsella (Laois)
11 April 2010; Round 7	G Reilly (0–2), J Sheridan (0–4), N Mooney (0–1), J Queeney (0–3, 1 45, one free), S O'Rourke (0–2), B Regan (0–1), B Farrell (1–2, 2 pts frees)	Report	H McGrillen (0–1), D Flynn (0–1), R Sweeney (0–3), J Doyle (0–8, 5 frees)	Páirc Tailteann; Referee: E Kinsella (Laois)

=== Final ===
25 April 2010; 4:00 p.m.	Down	1–12 – 0–17	Armagh	Croke Park, Dublin; Referee: Gearóid Ó Conamha (Galway)
25 April 2010; 4:00 p.m.	Conor Garvey (0–1); Peter Fitzpatrick (0–1), Kalum King (0–1), Martin Clarke (0–5), Daniel Hughes (0–1); Paul McComiskey (0–1), Benny Coulter (1–2)	Report	Paul Duffy (0–1), Finian Moriarty (0–1); Aaron Kernan (0–4), Gareth Swift (0–2); Steven McDonnell (0–6), Stephen Forker (0–1), Malachy Mackin (0–2)	Croke Park, Dublin; Referee: Gearóid Ó Conamha (Galway)

== Division 3 ==
Compete in Division 3 final and automatic promotion to Division 2 Automatic relegation to Division 4

Team	Pld	W	D	L	F	A	Diff	Pts
Antrim	7	5	0	2	6–91	5–70	+24	10
Sligo	7	5	0	2	6–95	7–78	+14	10
Wexford	7	5	0	2	8–73	4–76	+9	10
Louth	7	4	0	3	12–71	8–75	+8	8
Cavan	7	4	0	3	4–96	4–83	+13	8
Offaly	7	3	0	4	9–81	10–86	−8	6
Fermanagh	7	1	0	6	4–61	7–86	−34	2
Roscommon	7	1	0	6	4–83	8–97	−26	2

- Louth were placed ahead of Cavan as they won the head-to-head match between the teams (7 March at Drogheda Park: 0–13 to 1–6).
- Fermanagh were placed ahead of Roscommon as they won the head-to-head match between the teams (13 February at Brewster Park: 2–6 to 0–11).

7 February 2010; Round 1	Cavan	2–20 – 1–10	Roscommon	Dr Hyde Park; Referee: D Corcoran (Mayo)
7 February 2010; Round 1	R Galligan 0–10 (6f, 1 sideline); C Mackey 1–1;E McGuigan 1–0; D Givney, E Reilly, G Smith 0–2 (1f) each; M McKeever, J McCutcheon, M Lyng 0–1 each.	Report	D Shine 1–7 (5f); J Rogers, D O'Gara, P Garvey 0–1 each.	Dr Hyde Park; Referee: D Corcoran (Mayo)

7 February 2010; Round 1	Louth	0–13 – 1–8	Wexford	Drogheda; Referee: C Branagan (Down)
7 February 2010; Round 1	C Judge 0–4, R Carroll, B White (3f) 0–3 each, A McDonnell 0–2, JP Rooney0-1.	Report	P Byrne 1–0, R Barry, A Flynn, B Brosnan (1f) 0–2 each, C Lyng (f), E Bradley 0–1 each.	Drogheda; Referee: C Branagan (Down)

7 February 2010; Round 1	Offaly	1–13 – 1–10	Fermanagh	Tullamore; Referee: S Doyle (Wexford)
7 February 2010; Round 1	J Reynolds 0–4, K Casey 0–3 (0-2f), C McManus 1–0, K Slattery, R Dalton, B Connor, D Egan, R Brady (f), N McNamee 0–1 each	Report	D Keenan 1–1, M Keenan 0–3 (0-2f), J Sherry 0–2, T McElroy, R Jones, C Flaherty, R Gallagher 0–1 each.	Tullamore; Referee: S Doyle (Wexford)

7 February 2010; Round 1	Antrim	1–12 – 0–14	Sligo	Casement Park; Referee: J McKee (Armagh).
7 February 2010; Round 1	P Cunningham 1–5 (1–0 pen, 2f); M McCann 0–3 (1f); D O'Hagan, C Close, M Magill, G O'Boyle 0–1 each.	Report	A Marren 0–7 (4f); M Breheny 0–3 (3f); M Quinn, J Davey, A Costello, S Coen 0–1 each.	Casement Park; Referee: J McKee (Armagh).

12 February 2010; 7.30; Round 2	Fermanagh	2–6 – 0–11	Roscommon	Brewster Park
12 February 2010; 7.30; Round 2	J Sherry, R Carson 1–0 each, C Flaherty, R Jones (1f) 0–2 each, D Keenan, M Keenan 0–1 each	Report	D Shine 0–6 (5f), Cathal Gregg, M Finneran, K Higgins, M O'Carroll, J Rodgers 0–1 each	Brewster Park

12 February 2010; 7.30; Round 2	Antrim	2–13 – 1–8	Cavan	Kingspan/Breffni Park
12 February 2010; 7.30; Round 2	Cunningham 0–8 (4f), T McCann 1–3, M Magill 1–0, M McCann, T Scullion 0–1 each	Report	R Galligan 1–3, (0-3f); G Smith 0–3 (3f); M McKeever 0–1, C Mackey 0–1	Kingspan/Breffni Park

12 February 2010; Round 2	Wexford	1–14 – 2–10	Offaly	Wexford Park; Referee: M Condon (Waterford)
12 February 2010; Round 2	A Flynn 1–2, B Brosnan 0–5, (1f, 1 '45), C Lyng 0–4 (1f), B Malone, P Naughter, P Byrne 0–1 each	Report	D Egan, A Lyons 1–0 each, N McNamee 0–6 (5f), J Reynolds 0–3, K Slattery 0–1	Wexford Park; Referee: M Condon (Waterford)

12 February 2010; Round 2	Sligo	1–14 – 2–10	Louth	Markievicz Park; Referee: E O'Grady (Leitrim)
12 February 2010; Round 2	A Marren 1–3 (3f), M Breheny 0–3 (2f), A Costello 0–3, S Coen 0–2, D Kelly, S Davey, J Davey 0–1 each	Report	JP Rooney 1–3 (1–0 pen), C Judge 1–2 (1f), A McDonnell 0–3, M Fanning, B White 0–1 each	Markievicz Park; Referee: E O'Grady (Leitrim)

6 March 2010; 19:30; Round 3	Antrim	0–16 – 0–8	Fermanagh	Casement Park; Referee: C Reynolds (Down)
6 March 2010; 19:30; Round 3	P Cunningham 0–7 (0-4f), M Magill, T McCann 0–2 each, G O'Boyle, C Close, J Loughrey, K O'Boyle, C Murray 0–1 each	Report	R Carson 0–4 (0-4f), T McElroy, M Keenan (0-2f) 0–2 each	Casement Park; Referee: C Reynolds (Down)

7 March 2010; 14:30; Round 3	Offaly	2–14 – 2–13	Roscommon	Tullamore; Referee: G McCormack (Dublin)
7 March 2010; 14:30; Round 3	N McNamee 1–8 (1–0 pen, 0-3f), J Reynolds 1–2, D Egan 0–3, S Ryan 0–1	Report	D Shine 0–6 (0-5f, 0–1 '45), J Rogers 1–1, C Cregg 1–0, J Connaughton 0–2, M Finneran, G Heneghan, D O'Gara, E Kenny 0–1 each	Tullamore; Referee: G McCormack (Dublin)

7 March 2010; 14:30; Round 3	Louth	0–13 – 1–6	Cavan	Drogheda Park; Referee: G Walsh (Antrim)
7 March 2010; 14:30; Round 3	B White 0–6 (0-3f, 0–1 '45), A Hoey 0–4 (0-4f), A Reid (0-1f), R Carroll, D Clarke 0–1 each	Report	C Mackey 1–3 (0-2f), G Smith 0–2 (0-2f), D Givney 0–1	Drogheda Park; Referee: G Walsh (Antrim)

7 March 2010; 13:00; Round 3	Wexford	3–7 – 1–6	Sligo	Wexford Park; Referee: D Brazil (Offaly)
7 March 2010; 13:00; Round 3	B Brosnan (0-1f), C Lyng (1–0 pen, 0-1f) 1–1 each, S Roche 0–4 (0-2f), D Waters 1–0, E Bradley 0–1	Report	M Breheny (0-3f), D Kelly (0-2f) 0–3 each, A Costello 1–0	Wexford Park; Referee: D Brazil (Offaly)

13 March 2010; 7.30; Round 4	Cavan	0–17 – 0–12	Wexford	Kingspan Breffni Park; Referee: J McKee (Armagh)
13 March 2010; 7.30; Round 4	C Mackey 0–5, D Givney, R Flanagan 0–3 each, R Cullivan, M Reilly 0–2 each, G Smith (0–1 '45), M McKeever 0–1 each	Report	S Roche 0–9 (0-8f), P Naughter 0–2, E Bradley 0–1	Kingspan Breffni Park; Referee: J McKee (Armagh)

14 March 2010; 2.30; Round 4	Fermanagh	0–10 – 2–11	Louth	Brewster Park; Referee: M Sludden (Tyrone)
14 March 2010; 2.30; Round 4	Keenan 0–5 (0-5f), E Maguire, K Cosgrove, J Sherry (0-1f), C Flaherty, T McElroy 0–1 each	Report	JP Rooney 1–3, S Lennon 1–1, B White 0–3 (0-2f), A McDonnell 0–2, A Hoey, M Brennan 0–1 each	Brewster Park; Referee: M Sludden (Tyrone)

14 March 2010; 2.30; Round 4	Roscommon	0–14 – 0–16	Antrim	Dr Hyde Park; Referee: T Quigley (Dublin)
14 March 2010; 2.30; Round 4	D Shine 0–9 (0-9f), K Higgins, G Heneghan 0–2 each, J Rogers 0–1	Report	P Cunningham 0–9 (0-5f), M McCann, K Close 0–2 each, M Magill, J Crozier, J Loughery 0–1 each	Dr Hyde Park; Referee: T Quigley (Dublin)

14 March 2010; 2.30; Round 4	Sligo	0–12 – 0–11	Offaly	Markievicz Park; Referee: Markievicz Park
14 March 2010; 2.30; Round 4	M Breheny 0–4 (3f), K Sweeney 0–2, T Taylor, S Coen, D Kelly, A Costello, S Gilmartin, S Davey 0–1 each	Report	N McNamee 0–5 (1f), J Reynolds 0–3, D Egan, C McManus, B Darby 0–1 each	Markievicz Park; Referee: Markievicz Park

21 March 2010; Round 5	Louth	1–09 – 0–13	Roscommon	Drogheda; Referee: S Carroll (Westmeath)
21 March 2010; Round 5	S Lennon 0–3, M Brennan 1–0, A Hoey (2f), A McDonnell 0–2 each, B White (f), D Crilly 0–1 each	Report	D Shine 0–5 (3f), P Garvey (1f), E Kenny 0–2 each, T Kelly, D Keenan, M O'Carroll, C Cregg 0–1 each	Drogheda; Referee: S Carroll (Westmeath)

21 March 2010; Round 5	Sligo	1–14 – 0–14	Cavan	Markievicz Park; Referee: R O'Donnell (Donegal)
21 March 2010; Round 5	C McGee 0–6 (0-2f, 1 '45'), K Sweeney 1–3, M Breheny 0–5 (0-2f)	Report	C Mackey 0–8 (0-5f), G Smith 0–4 (0-2f), M Brennan, L Mulvey 0–1 each	Markievicz Park; Referee: R O'Donnell (Donegal)

21 March 2010; Round 5	Offaly	1–9 – 1–8	Antrim	Tullamore; Referee: T Quigley (Dublin)
21 March 2010; Round 5	N McNamee 1–2 (1–0 pen), D Egan 0–3, J Reynolds, C McManus (0-1f) 0–2 each	Report	P Cunningham 1–6 (1–0 pen, 0-3f), B Herron, C Close 0–1 each	Tullamore; Referee: T Quigley (Dublin)

21 March 2010; Round 5	Wexford	1–9 – 0–9	Fermanagh	Wexford Park; Referee: M Deegan (Laois)
21 March 2010; Round 5	E Bradley 1–1, S Roche 0–4 (0-3f), A Doyle, R Barry, A Flynn, C Lyng (0–1 each)	Report	R Gallagher 0-6f; T McElroy, M Keenan, R Keenan 0–1 each	Wexford Park; Referee: M Deegan (Laois)

27 March 2010; 7.30; Round 6	Antrim	2–14 – 2–6	Louth	Casement Park; Referee: C Reynolds (Down)
27 March 2010; 7.30; Round 6	P Cunningham 1–6 (5f), M McCann 0–3, J Crozier 1–0, G O'Boyle, T McCann 0–2 each, K Niblock 0–1	Report	M Brennan 2–0, A McDonnell, A Hoey, B White 0–2 each	Casement Park; Referee: C Reynolds (Down)

27 March 2010; 7.30; Round 6	Cavan	0–20 – 0–14	Offaly	Kingspan Breffni Park; Referee: P Kneel (Louth)
27 March 2010; 7.30; Round 6	C Mackey 0–7 (1f), M Brennan (1f), G Smith (1 '45', 1f) 0–4 each, M McKeever 0–2, R Flanagan, L Mulvey, E McGuigan 0–1 each	Report	J Reynolds 0–5, C McManus 0–4 (0–1 '45, 0-1f), R Brady 0–2 (0-2f), D Egan, C Kiely, S Brady 0–1 each	Kingspan Breffni Park; Referee: P Kneel (Louth)

28 March 2010; 2.30; Round 6	Fermanagh	1–11 – 3–15	Sligo	Brewster Park; Referee: C Branagan (Down)
28 March 2010; 2.30; Round 6	Rory Gallagher 0–7 (0-4f, 2 '45'), T McElroy 1–0 (1 pen), D Keenan 0–2, R Keenan, C O'Brien 0–1 each	Report	C McGee 1–4 (0-3f, 1 '45), A Costello 1–3 (0-1f), M Breheny 0–4 (0-3f), C Harrison 1–0, J Davey, S Gilmartin, K Sweeney, D Kelly 0–1 each	Brewster Park; Referee: C Branagan (Down)

28 March 2010; 2.30; Round 6	Roscommon	1–9 – 1–12	Wexford	Dr Hyde Park; Referee: M Duffy (Sligo)
28 March 2010; 2.30; Round 6	C McHugh 1–0, D Shine 0–3 (0-2f), J Rogers 0–2, D Ward, K Higgins, E Kenny, P Garvey 0–1 each	Report	S Roche 1–3 (0-3f), R Barry, A Flynn C Lyng (0-1f) 0–2 each, C Deely, B Doyle, C Morris 0–1 each	Dr Hyde Park; Referee: M Duffy (Sligo)

11 April 2010; Round 7	Louth	5–9 – 3–10	Offaly	O'Connor Park; Referee: R Moloney (Limerick)
11 April 2010; Round 7	P Smith 3–0, JP Rooney 2–0, B White 0–4 (2f), A McDonnell 0–2, D Byrne, M Brennan, A Reid 0–1 each	Report	N McNamee 1–3 (1–0 pen), J Reynolds 0–4, C McManus (1 '45), K Casey (1f) 1–1 each, R Brady 0–1 (f)	O'Connor Park; Referee: R Moloney (Limerick)

11 April 2010; Round 7	Sligo	0–20 – 0–13	Roscommon	Markievicz Park; Referee: G McCarron (Monaghan)
11 April 2010; Round 7	M Breheny 0–7 (0-3f), D Kelly 0–5 (0-1f), A Costello 0–3, K Sweeney 0–2, S Coen, S Gilmartin, T Taylor 0–1 each	Report	J Rogers 0–8 (0-6f), K Mannion 0–2, D Hussey, B Higgins, D Keenan 0–1 each	Markievicz Park; Referee: G McCarron (Monaghan)

11 April 2010; Round 7	Wexford	1–11 – 0–12	Antrim	Wexford Park; Referee: M Collins (Cork)
11 April 2010; Round 7	C Lyng 0–7 (0-6f), E Bradley 1–0, B Brosnan 0–2 (0-1f, 1 '45'), S Roche (0-1f) R Barry 0–1 each	Report	P Cunningham 0–4 (0-3f), M McCann, B Herron 0–2 each, T O'Neill, J Loughrey, G O'Boyle, T McCann 0–1 each	Wexford Park; Referee: M Collins (Cork)

11 April 2010; Round 7	Cavan	0–11 – 0–7	Fermanagh	Kingspan/Breffni Park; Referee: S McNamee (Tyrone)
11 April 2010; Round 7	C Mackey 0–3 (0-1f), M McKeever, G Smith, L Mulvey 0–2 each, M Cahill, C Galligan 0–1 each	Report	R Carson 0–2 (0-2f), P Ward, J Sherry, K Cosgrove, N Cunningham (0-1f), D Keenan 0–1 each	Kingspan/Breffni Park; Referee: S McNamee (Tyrone)

=== Final ===
24 April 2010; 7:00 p.m.	Antrim	1–11 – 0–19	Sligo	Croke Park, Dublin; Referee: Maurice Condon (Waterford)
24 April 2010; 7:00 p.m.	P Cunningham 0–6 (3f); M McCann 1–0; CJ McGourty, T McCann, C Close, A Gallagher, G O'Boyle 0–1 each	Report	C McGee 0–5 (1f); M Breheny 0–4 (1f); S Gilmartin, S Coen 0–3 each; D Kelly 0–2; A Costello, K Sweeney 0–1 each	Croke Park, Dublin; Referee: Maurice Condon (Waterford)

== Division 4 ==
Compete in Division 4 final and automatic promotion to Division 3

Team	Pld	W	D	L	F	A	Diff	Pts
Waterford	8	6	2	0	6–123	7–65	+55	14
Limerick	8	6	1	1	12–107	6–64	+61	13
Clare	8	6	0	2	13–95	1–96	+35	12
Wicklow	8	5	1	2	10–110	6–76	+46	11
Leitrim	8	4	0	4	5–117	6–98	+16	8
Carlow	8	3	1	4	5–93	3–92	+7	7
Longford	8	2	1	5	5–93	5–74	+19	5
London	8	1	0	7	4–67	7–120	−68	2
Kilkenny	8	0	0	8	5–29	24–143	−171	0

7 February 2010; Round 1	Waterford	0–13 – 0–10	Leitrim	Ballinamore; Referee: V Neary (Mayo)
7 February 2010; Round 1	W Hennessey (2f), B Wall (4f) 0–4 each, C McGrath 0–2, M Aherne, S Briggs, M Donnelly 0–1 each.		J Glancy (3f), P Howard 0–3 each, P McGuinness, D O'Connor, D Gilhooly, D Beck 0–1 each.	Ballinamore; Referee: V Neary (Mayo)

7 February 2010; Round 1	Limerick	0–17 – 1–4	London	Ruislip; Referee: F Flynn (Leitrim)
7 February 2010; Round 1	I Ryan 0–6 (5f); J Ryan 0–4; C Joyce-Power, G Collins, P Browne, J Mullane, J McCarthy, S Lavin, S Kelly 0–1 each.	Report	K Phair 1–1 (1f); D Horan 0–2; C Donnellan (f) 0–1.	Ruislip; Referee: F Flynn (Leitrim)

7 February 2010; Round 1	Carlow	1–10 – 0–10	Longford	Dr. Cullen Park; Referee: B Tyrell (Tipperary).
7 February 2010; Round 1	JJ Smith 0–5 (5f), J Murphy 1–0, M Carpenter 0–2, Brendan Murphy, S Gannon, S Rea (f) 0–1 each.	Report	F McGee 0–5 (5f), J Martin 0–2 (2f), D Keenan, B Kavanagh, D Masterson 0–1 each.	Dr. Cullen Park; Referee: B Tyrell (Tipperary).

7 February 2010; Round 1	Clare	1–09 – 0–11	Wicklow	Ennis; Referee: M Meade (Limerick).
7 February 2010; Round 1	D Tubridy 0–5 (4f); G Lynch 1–0; L Healy 0–2; A Clohessy, D Russell 0–1 each.	Report	T Hannon 0–6 (4f, 1 '45); L Glynn 0–2; S Furlong, P McWalter, P Cunningham 0–1 each.	Ennis; Referee: M Meade (Limerick).

12 February 2010; Round 2	Limerick	0–11 – 0–7	Carlow	Kilmallock
12 February 2010; Round 2	I Ryan 0–6 (5f), C Joyce-Power 0–2, J Mullane, G Collins, R Hayes 0–1 each	Report	JJ Smith 0–3 (1f), B Murphy 0–2, S Gannon, E McCormack 0–1 each	Kilmallock

12 February 2010; Round 2	Waterford	1–16 – 0–8	London	Dungarvan; Referee: D O'Mahony (Tipperary)
12 February 2010; Round 2	M Donnelly 0–5 (2f), R Ahearne 1–2, C McGrath 0–4, B Wall (1f), L Ó Lonáin 0–2 each, T Prendergast 0–1	Report	K Phair 0–6 (4f), D Horan, P Whelan 0–1 each	Dungarvan; Referee: D O'Mahony (Tipperary)

12 February 2010; Round 2	Kilkenny	0–2 – 4–18	Clare	Nowlan Park; Referee: D Brazil (Offaly)
12 February 2010; Round 2	G Lalor 0–2 (frees).	Report	D Tubridy 2–7 (1–0 pen, 4f), D Russell 1–3, C Dunning 1–0, G Quinlan (1 '45), A Clohosey 0–2 each, G Brennan, P Reidy, G Leahy, L Healy 0–1 each	Nowlan Park; Referee: D Brazil (Offaly)

12 February 2010; Round 2	Wicklow	1–13 – 0–9	Leitrim	Aughrim; Referee: E Kinsella (Laois)
12 February 2010; Round 2	T Hannon 1–4 (2f 1'45), S Furlong 0–4 (f), L Glynn 0–2, JP Dalton, P Dalton and B McGrath 0–1 each	Report	M Foley 0–3 (0-3f), D O'Connor, D O'Donnell, D Gilhooly, E Mulligan, C Regan, B Prior 0–1 each	Aughrim; Referee: E Kinsella (Laois)

20 February 2010; 2.30; Round 3	London	1–5 – 4–13	Wicklow	Ruislip; Referee: S McNamee (Tyrone)
20 February 2010; 2.30; Round 3	J Hughes (1–0), C McAllion (0–2), D Horan (0–1), K Phair (0–2, 2f).	Report	P McWalter (0–2), J Stafford (0–1), T Hannon (0–4, 2f), R Finn (0–2); S Furlong (3–2, 1f), L Glynn (0–1), D Hayden (1–0), P Cunningham (0–1).	Ruislip; Referee: S McNamee (Tyrone)

20 February 2010; 2.30; Round 3	Carlow	1–11 – 1–11	Waterford	Dr Cullen PArk; Referee: B O'Shea (Dublin).
20 February 2010; 2.30; Round 3	E McCormack 0–7 (0-3f), J Murphy 1–0, M Carpenter 0–2, B Murphy, JJ Smith (f) 0–1 each	Report	M Donnelly 0–4 (0-2f), L O Lionain 1–1, R Aherne 0–3, S Cunningham 0–2, T Grey 0–1.	Dr Cullen PArk; Referee: B O'Shea (Dublin).

20 February 2010; 2.30; Round 3	Leitrim	4–18 – 1–4	Kilkenny	Páirc Seán Mac Diarmada; Referee: G McCarron (Monaghan).
20 February 2010; 2.30; Round 3	D Gilhooly 2–1, J Glancy (Glencar/Manorhamilton) 1–2, C Regan 1–1, E Mulligan 0–6 (0-3f), M Foley 0–3, C Farrell 0–2, P McGuinness, C Richardson, D Sweeney 0–1 each	Report	P Donnelly 1–0, G Lalor 0–2 (0-1f), P Raftice, M Saunders 0–1 each	Páirc Seán Mac Diarmada; Referee: G McCarron (Monaghan).

20 February 2010; 2.30; Round 3	Longford	0–9 – 1–8	Limerick	Pearse Park; Referee: S Carroll (Westmeath).
20 February 2010; 2.30; Round 3	F McGee 0–6 (0-3f, 0–1 '45), K Mulligan, C Mimnagh, K Smith 0–1 each	Report	I Ryan 0–5 (0-4f), J O'Dononvan 1–0, S Lavin, J Ryan, G Collins 0–1 each	Pearse Park; Referee: S Carroll (Westmeath).

7 March 2010; Round 4	Kilkenny	0–2 – 1–17	London	Freshford; Referee: M Collins (Cork)
7 March 2010; Round 4	P Raftice, P Donnelly 0–1 each	Report	A Fitzgerald 1–4, P Whelan 0–4 (0-2f), P Geraghty (0-1f), E Magee 0–3 each, D Horan 0–2, N Doherty 0–1	Freshford; Referee: M Collins (Cork)

7 March 2010; Round 4	Waterford	0–10 – 1–7	Longford	Fraher Field; Referee: Richard Moloney (Limerick)
7 March 2010; Round 4	B Wall 0–5 (0-4f), M Donnelly (0-1f), N Hennessy, T Prendergast, W Hennessy, L O'Lionnain 0–1 each	Report	F McGee 1–5 (1–0 pen, 0-3f), J Martin 0–2 (0-1f)	Fraher Field; Referee: Richard Moloney (Limerick)

7 March 2010; Round 4	Wicklow	0–14 – 0–7	Carlow	Aughrim; Referee: S Doyle (Wexford)
7 March 2010; Round 4	S Furlong 0–3 (0-1f), L Glynn, C Jones, P Earle 0–2 each, P McWalter, S Canavan, R Finn, P Cunningham, T Hannon 0–1 each	Report	J Kavanagh 0–3 (0-3f), Mark Carpenter (0-2f), S Gannon 0–2 each	Aughrim; Referee: S Doyle (Wexford)

7 March 2010; Round 4	Clare	2–12 – 0–17	Leitrim	Cusack Park, Ennis; Referee: P Sheehy (Kerry)
7 March 2010; Round 4	D Tubridy 0–7 (0-4f), B Toner 1–2, C Dunning 1–0, M O'Shea 0–2, G Brennan 0–1	Report	M Foley 0–8 (0-7f), P Howard 0–3, D O'Connor, J Glancy 0–2 each, P McGuinness, D Sweeney 0–1 each	Cusack Park, Ennis; Referee: P Sheehy (Kerry)

13 March 2010; 7.30; Round 5	Limerick	1–11 – 1–12	Waterford	Gaelic Grounds; Referee: G Lynch (Kerry).
13 March 2010; 7.30; Round 5	G Collins 0–5 (4f), S Buckley 1–1 (1–0 pen), J O'Donovan 0–3, P Ranahan, J Ryan 0–1 each	Report	W Hennessy 0–6 (2f), R Ahern 1–0, C McGrath, B Wall 0–2 each, L O Lionnain, Ml O'Gorman 0–1 each	Gaelic Grounds; Referee: G Lynch (Kerry).

14 March 2010; 2.30; Round 5	Carlow	2–19 – 0–8	Kilkenny	Dr Cullen Park
14 March 2010; 2.30; Round 5	J Kavanagh 0–8 (6f), J Murphy 2–2, W Minchin 0–3, S Gannon 0–2, A Curran, M Davis, K Doyle, D Dowling 0–1 each	Report	P Raftice 0–4 (2f), A Mackey, M Malone, C Foran (f), M Saunders ('45) 0–1 each	Dr Cullen Park

14 March 2010; 2.30; Round 5	Longford	1–11 – 2–09	Wicklow	Pearse Park; Referee: P Knell (Sligo)
14 March 2010; 2.30; Round 5	F McGee 0–8 (0-6f, 0–2 '45), D Barden 1–0, K Smyth 0–2, B McElvaney 0–1	Report	L Glynn 1–3, S Furlong 1–2 (0-2f), T Hannon (0-1f), P Cunningham, P McWalter, P Earls 0–1 each	Pearse Park; Referee: P Knell (Sligo)

14 March 2010; 2.30; Round 5	London	1–08 – 1–19	Clare	Ruislip; Referee: P Finnegan (Louth)
14 March 2010; 2.30; Round 5	D Hayden 1–0, D Horan 0–3 (2f), C McCallion, K McMenamin (1f) 0–2 each, E O'Neill 0–1	Report	A Clohessy 1–2, D Tubridy 0–5 (0–2 f), D Russell, M, O' Shea 0–3 each, P Reidy, G Quinlan 0–2 each, B Toner, G Kelly 0–1 each	Ruislip; Referee: P Finnegan (Louth)

21 March 2010; Round 6	Leitrim	0–25 – 0–10	London	Carrick-on-Shannon; Referee: D Corcoran (Mayo)
21 March 2010; Round 6	M Foley 0–7(0-4f), J Glancy (Glencar Mnr) 0–6, P Howard, P McGuinness, T Beirne 0–2 each, S Canning, J Glancy (St Mary's), W McKeon, D. Gilhooley, D O'Connor 0–1 each	Report	K. McMenamin 0–4 (0-2f), J Niblock, D Hayden, E O'Neill, K Phair, B Smyth, N Egan 0–1 each	Carrick-on-Shannon; Referee: D Corcoran (Mayo)

21 March 2010; Round 6	Clare	1–13 – 0–15	Carlow	Cusack Park, Ennis; Referee: B Tyrrell (Tipperary)
21 March 2010; Round 6	D Tubridy 1–11 (4f), B Toner, M O'Shea 0–1 each	Report	J Kavanagh 0–4 (4f), E O'Toole (3f), A Curran 0–3 each, W Minchin, M Carpenter 0–2 each, JJ Smith 0–1(f)	Cusack Park, Ennis; Referee: B Tyrrell (Tipperary)

21 March 2010; Round 6	Kilkenny	1–2 – 2–19	Longford	Freshford; Referee: B. O'Shea (Dublin)
21 March 2010; Round 6	P Duggan 1–0, P Rafcie (f), M. Saunders 0–1 each	Report	F McGee 2–10 (1-0pen, 0-4f), B Kavanagh 0–4, R McGolderick 0–2, D Brady, D Morgan, G Dennigan 0–1 each	Freshford; Referee: B. O'Shea (Dublin)

21 March 2010; Round 6	Wicklow	0–14 – 1–11	Limerick	Aughrim; Referee: E Kinsella (Laois)
21 March 2010; Round 6	T Hannon 0–4 (0-2f, 0-1'45), S Furlong 0–4 (0- 3f), P Cunningham 0–3, J Stafford, P Earls, L Glynn 0–1 each	Report	G Collins 1–7 (6f), C Joyce-Power 0–2, D Carroll, G Noonan 0–1 each	Aughrim; Referee: E Kinsella (Laois)

27 March 2010; 2.30; Round 7	Carlow	1–12 – 1–16	Leitrim	Dr Cullen Park; Referee: D O'Mahoney (Tipperary)
27 March 2010; 2.30; Round 7	J J Smith 0–5 (0-3f), S Rea 0–4, (0-2f, 0–1 '45), A Curran 1–1, Foley, B Kavanagh 0–1 each	Report	M Foley 0–7 (0-3f), James Glancy (Glencar/Manorhamilton) 0–3, P Cashin (1–0, o.g.), W McKeon, D O'Connor 0–2 each, P McGuinness, D Gilhooley 0–1 each	Dr Cullen Park; Referee: D O'Mahoney (Tipperary)

27 March 2010; 7.30; Round 7	Limerick	8–13 – 2–2	Kilkenny	Gaelic Grounds; Referee: J Lynch (Kerry)
27 March 2010; 7.30; Round 7	S Buckley 3–2 (1–0 pen), J Ryan, J Cooke 2–1 each, C Mullane, 1–0, G Noonan, (0-1f), G Collins (0-2f) 0–2 each, C Fitzgerald (0-1f), R Hayes, E Joy, A Lane, J O'Donovan 0–1 each	Report	D Grennan and J Culleton, 1–0 each, G Lalor, 0–2 (2f)	Gaelic Grounds; Referee: J Lynch (Kerry)

28 March 2010; 2.30; Round 7	Longford	0–9 – 0–12	Clare	Pearse Park; Referee: P Finnegan (Louth)
28 March 2010; 2.30; Round 7	F McGee 0–5 (0-2f), K Smyth, D Reilly, R McGoldrick, D Masterson 0–1 each	Report	D Tubridy 0–4 (0-1f), G Brennan, M O'Shea (0-1f) 0–3 each, B Toner, A Clohessy 0–1 each	Pearse Park; Referee: P Finnegan (Louth)

28 March 2010; 2.30; Round 7	Waterford	2–17 – 1–11	Wicklow	Fraher Field; Referee: T Lynch (Kerry)
28 March 2010; 2.30; Round 7	L Ó Lionáin 2–2, W Hennessy 0–5 (2f), B Wall (1f), C McGrath 0–3 each, R Ahearne, M Donnelly (f), S Briggs, G Hurney 0–1 each	Report	T Hannon 0–5 (2f, 1 '45), S Furlong 0–3 (2f), J P Dalton 1–0, P Earls 0–2, P McWalter 0–1	Fraher Field; Referee: T Lynch (Kerry)

4 April 2010; 2.30; Round 8	Carlow	0–12 – 0–9	London	Ruislip, London; Referee: G Walsh (Antrim)
4 April 2010; 2.30; Round 8	S Rea 0–3 (0-1f), E McCormack (0-2f), J Kavanagh (0-1f) 0–2 each, P Murphy, M Carpenter, D Foley, W Minchin, T Bolger 0–1 each	Report	K Phair 0–5 (0-5f), J Cott, A Moyles, N Tuohy, K O'Leary 0–1 each	Ruislip, London; Referee: G Walsh (Antrim)

4 April 2010; 2.30; Round 8	Waterford	1–24 – 1–2	Kilkenny	Freshford; Referee: Joe Curley (Meath)
4 April 2010; 2.30; Round 8	L O Lionain 1–4, G Hurney 0–5 (0-3f), C McGrath 0–4, B Wall 0–3, W Hennessey (0-2f), M Ahearne 0–2 each, J Phelan, P Hurney, T Gray, R Ahearne 0–1 each	Report	S Duggan 1–0, P Raftice (0-1f), G Lalor 0–1 each	Freshford; Referee: Joe Curley (Meath)

4 April 2010; 2.30; Round 8	Leitrim	0–13 – 0–12	Longford	Carrick-on-Shannon; Referee: R O'Donnell (Donegal)
4 April 2010; 2.30; Round 8	L O Lionain 1–4, G Hurney 0–5 (0-3f), C McGrath 0–4, B Wall 0–3, W Hennessey (0-2f), M Ahearne 0–2 each, J Phelan, P Hurney, T Gray, R Ahearne 0–1 each	Report	S Duggan 1–0, P Raftice (0-1f), G Lalor 0–1 each	Carrick-on-Shannon; Referee: R O'Donnell (Donegal)

4 April 2010; 2.30; Round 8	Limerick	0–14 – 2–7	Clare	Cusack Park, Ennis; Referee: P O'Sullivan (Kerry)
4 April 2010; 2.30; Round 8	G Collins 0–4, I Ryan, E O'Connor 0–3 each, J Mullane 0–2, C Joyce-Power, S Buckley 0–1 each	Report	D Tubridy 2–5, G Brennan, A Clohessy 0–1 each	Cusack Park, Ennis; Referee: P O'Sullivan (Kerry)

11 April 2010; Round 9	Longford	1–16 – 0–10	London	Pearse Park; Referee: Michael McGann (Clare)
11 April 2010; Round 9	F McGee 0–10 (0-5f, 1 '45'), R McGoldrick 1–2, P Dowd 0–2, B McElvaney, D Reilly 0–1 each	Report	K Phair (0-3f), K McMenamin (0-2f) 0–3 each, A Moyle 0–2, J Cott, E O'Neill 0–1 each	Pearse Park; Referee: Michael McGann (Clare)

11 April 2010; Round 9	Waterford	0–20 – 2–05	Clare	Fraher Field; Referee: P Sheehy (Kerry)
11 April 2010; Round 9	G Hurney 0–7 (0-2f), B Wall 0–4 (3f), W Hennessy 0–3 (1f), C McGrath, L O'Lionain 0–2 each, T Prendergast, P Hennessy 0–1 each	Report	D Tubridy 1–4 (1–1 pen, 0–2 '45, 0-2f), G Brennan 1–0, G Kelly 0–1	Fraher Field; Referee: P Sheehy (Kerry)

11 April 2010; Round 9	Wicklow	2–25 – 0–7	Kilkenny	Aughrim; Referee: E O'Grady (Leitrim)
11 April 2010; Round 9	S Furlong 0–10 (0-3f), N Mullett 0–6, D Odlum 1–2, D Siney 1–0, S Canavan 0–3, R Finn 0–2, N Gaffney, P Byrne 0–1 each	Report	S Duggan 0–5, JJ Dunphy, S Ryan 0–1 each	Aughrim; Referee: E O'Grady (Leitrim)

11 April 2010; Round 9	Limerick	1–22 – 0–9	Leitrim	Gaelic Grounds, Limerick; Referee: G McCormack (Dublin)
11 April 2010; Round 9	I Ryan, G Collins (3f) 0–6 each, S Buckley 1–0 (pen), J O'Donovan, J Ryan, and C Fitzgerald 0–2 each, J Mullane, J Galvin, E O'Connor, J Cooke 0–1 each	Report	M Foley 0–5 (5f), D Gilhooley 0–2, S Canning and R Kennedy 0–1 each	Gaelic Grounds, Limerick; Referee: G McCormack (Dublin)

=== Final ===
24 April 2010; 5:00 p.m. Division 4 Final	Waterford	1–14 – 1–16	Limerick	Croke Park, Dublin; Referee: Robert O'Donnell (Donegal)
24 April 2010; 5:00 p.m. Division 4 Final		Report		Croke Park, Dublin; Referee: Robert O'Donnell (Donegal)

== Statistics ==
- All scores correct as of 29 March 2016

=== Scoring ===
- Widest winning margin: 29
  - Limerick 8–13 – 2–2 Kilkenny (Division 4)
- Most goals in a match: 10
  - Limerick 8–13 – 2–2 Kilkenny (Division 4)
- Most points in a match: 36
  - Cork 1–19 – 1–17 Galway (Division 1)
- Most goals by one team in a match: 8
  - Limerick 8–13 – 2–2 Kilkenny (Division 4)
- Highest aggregate score: 45 points
  - Limerick 8–13 – 2–2 Kilkenny (Division 4)
- Lowest aggregate score: 17 points
  - Armagh 0–12 – 0–5 Kildare (Division 2)

=== Top scorers ===
Overall

Rank	Player	County	Tally	Total	Matches	Average
1	David Tubridy	Clare	6–48	66	8	8.2
2	Francis McGee	Longford	3–55	64	8	8
3	Paddy Cunningham	Antrim	3–51	60	8	7.5
4	Steven McDonnell	Armagh	3–45	54	8	6.8
5	Michael Foley	Leitrim	0–41	41	8	5.1
6	Seanie Furlong	Wicklow	4–28	40	8	5
7	Ger Collins	Limerick	2–33	39	9	4.3
7	Donal Shine	Roscommon	1–36	39	6	6.5
9	Bernard Brogan	Dublin	3–28	37	6	6.2
9	Barry Grogan	Tipperary	4–25	37	6	6.2
11	Michael Murphy	Donegal	2–28	34	7	4.9
11	Niall McNamee	Offaly	3–25	34	6	5.7
13	Mark Breheny	Sligo	0–33	33	8	4.1
13	Cian Mackey	Cavan	2–27	33	7	4.7
15	Ian Ryan	Limerick	0–31	31	6	5.2
16	Conor McManus	Monaghan	1–26	29	6	4.8

Single game

Rank	Player	County	Tally	Total	Opposition
1	Francis McGee	Longford	2–10	16	Kilkenny
2	David Tubridy	Clare	1–11	14	Carlow
3	MJ Tierney	Laois	0–13	13	Westmeath
3	David Tubridy	Clare	2–7	13	Kilkenny
5	Steven McDonnell	Armagh	1–9	12	Westmeath
6	Bernard Brogan	Dublin	0–11	11	Galway
6	Niall McNamee	Offaly	1–8	11	Roscommon
6	David Tubridy	Clare	2–5	11	Limerick
6	Seanie Buckley	Limerick	3–2	11	Kilkenny
6	Seanie Furlong	Wicklow	3–2	11	London

Preceded by 2011 National Football League	National Football League; 1926 – present	Succeeded by 2013 National Football League
