= 2009 National Football League (Ireland) =

Gaelic football competition

League details
- Dates: 31 January - 26 April 2009
- Teams: 32

League champions
- Winners: Kerry (19th win)
- Captain: Darran O'Sullivan
- Manager: Jack O'Connor

League runners-up
- Runners-up: Derry
- Captain: Fergal Doherty
- Manager: Damian Cassidy

Other division winners
- Division 2: Cork
- Division 3: Tipperary
- Division 4: Sligo

The 2009 National Football League, known for sponsorship reasons as the Allianz National Football League, was the 78th staging of the National Football League (NFL), an annual Gaelic football tournament for the Gaelic Athletic Association county teams of Ireland. The League began on 31 January 2009. Thirty-two Gaelic football county teams from the island of Ireland, plus London, participated.

On 26 April, Kerry defeated Derry by 1-15 to 0-15 to win their 19th league title.

== Format ==
=== League structure ===
The 2009 format of the National Football League was a system of four divisions. The top three divisions consisted of 8 teams, and Division 4 contained nine teams. Each team played every other team in its division once, either home or away. 2 points were awarded for a win and 1 for a draw.

=== Tie-breaker ===
If two or more teams were level on points:

- Points difference (total scored minus total conceded in all games) was used to rank the teams
- If points difference was identical, total scored was used to rank the teams
- If still identical, the head-to-head game between the teams concerned was used to rank the teams

=== Finals, promotions and relegations ===
The top two teams in Division 1 contested the 2009 NFL final. The top two teams in divisions 2, 3 and 4 were promoted, and contested the finals of their respective divisions. The bottom two teams in divisions 1, 2 and 3 were relegated.

== Division 1 ==
=== Table ===
Compete in Division 1 final Automatic relegation to Division 2

Team	Pld	W	D	L	F	A	Diff	Pts
Kerry	7	6	1	0	8-90	2-77	31	13
Derry	7	4	1	2	2-95	3-72	20	9
Galway	7	4	1	2	9-79	3-83	14	9
Mayo	7	2	3	2	4-78	3-76	5	7
Tyrone	7	3	1	3	2-90	6-79	-1	7
Dublin	7	2	2	3	8-100	6-92	14	6
Donegal	7	2	1	4	3-77	5-84	-13	5
Westmeath	7	0	0	7	3-59	11-105	-70	0

=== Rounds 1 to 7 ===
31/01/09; Round 1	Dublin	1-16 - 1-18	Tyrone	Croke Park, Dublin; Referee: M Duffy
31/01/09; Round 1	B Brogan (1-5), C Keaney (0-5), G Brennan (0-1), C Whelan (0-1), D Henry (0-1), J Sherlock (0-2), P Flynn (0-1)		S O’Neill (0-8), S Cavanagh (0-4), O Mulligan (1-1), T McGuigan (0-1), C McCullagh (0-3), Joe McMahon (0-1)	Croke Park, Dublin; Referee: M Duffy

01/02/09; Round 1	Mayo	0-10 - 1-9	Derry	James Stephens Park, Ballina; Referee: M Deegan
01/02/09; Round 1	A Dillon (0-3), A Moran (0-2), C Mortimer (0-2), P Gardiner (0-1), R McGarrity (0-1), T Parsons (0-1)		J Kielty (1-2), B McGoldrick (0-3), F Doherty (0-1), P Cartin (0-1), S Bradley (0-1)	James Stephens Park, Ballina; Referee: M Deegan

01/02/09; Round 1	Westmeath	0-11 - 2-10	Galway	Cusack Park, Mullingar; Referee: B Crowe
01/02/09; Round 1	D Dolan (0-3), D Glennon (0-3), T McDaniel (0-3), D Bannon (0-1), P Kelly (0-1)		M Meehan (1-5), J Ryan (1-0), N Joyce (0-2), C Bane (0-1), P Conroy (0-1), P Joyce (0-1)	Cusack Park, Mullingar; Referee: B Crowe

01/02/09; Round 1	Kerry	2-13 - 0-11	Donegal	Austin Stack Park, Tralee; Referee: G Keneavey
01/02/09; Round 1	C Cooper (1-3), T Walsh (1-2), D Moran (0-3), P Galvin (0-3), Darren O'Sullivan (0-1), Declan O'Sullivan (0-1)		B Roper (0-3), S Griffin (0-3), M Doherty (0-2), B Monaghan (0-1), D Walsh (0-1), N Gallagher (0-1)	Austin Stack Park, Tralee; Referee: G Keneavey

14/02/09; Round 2	Donegal	2-10 - 1-13	Mayo	O'Donnell Park, Letterkenny; Referee: J Bannon
14/02/09; Round 2	Michael Murphy (2-0), S Griffin (0-5), C Bonner (0-2), David Walsh (0-1), E McGee (0-1), M Doherty (0-1)		C Mortimer (0-6), B Moran (1-1), A Dillon (0-1), B Padden (0-1), K Conroy (0-1), M Sweeney (0-1), P Gardiner (0-1), T Mortimer (0-1)	O'Donnell Park, Letterkenny; Referee: J Bannon

15/02/09; Round 2	Galway	3-12 - 0-13	Dublin	Pearse Stadium, Salthill; Referee: R Hickey
15/02/09; Round 2	M Meehan (1-3), S Armstrong (1-2), C Bane (0-4), P Conroy (1-1), P Joyce (0-2)		B Brogan (0-6), C Whelan (0-3), C Keaney (0-2), B Cahill (0-1), D Henry (0-1)	Pearse Stadium, Salthill; Referee: R Hickey

15/02/09; Round 2	Derry	1-18 - 0-7	Westmeath	Dean McGlinchey Park, Ballinascreen; Referee: P McEneaney
15/02/09; Round 2	E Bradley (0-5), Paul Bradley (0-5), E Lynn (0-3), E Brown (1-0), G OKane (0-2), B Mullan (0-1), P Cartin (0-1), Paddy Bradley (0-1)		D Dolan (0-3), D Glennon (0-3), T McDaniel (0-1)	Dean McGlinchey Park, Ballinascreen; Referee: P McEneaney

15/02/09; Round 2	Tyrone	0-13 - 2-10	Kerry	Healy Park, Omagh; Referee: Jimmy White
15/02/09; Round 2	S Cavanagh (0-6), C McCullagh (0-2), T McGuigan (0-2), E McGinley (0-1), Justin McMahon (0-1), O Mulligan (0-1)		C Cooper (2-3), Darren O'Sullivan (0-2), A O'Mahony (0-1), B Sheehan (0-1), D Moran (0-1), P Galvin (0-1), M O Sé	Healy Park, Omagh; Referee: Jimmy White

07/03/09; Round 3	Tyrone	0-8 - 0-10	Galway	Healy Park, Omagh; Referee: - M Deegan
07/03/09; Round 3	S Cavanagh (0-3), T McGuigan (0-2), C McCullagh (0-1), D Harte (0-1), M Swift (0-1)		N Joyce (0-4), J Bergin (0-2), M Meehan (0-2), C Bane (0-1), P Joyce (0-1)	Healy Park, Omagh; Referee: - M Deegan

08/03/09; Round 3	Mayo	1-13 - 0-8	Westmeath	Fr O'Hara Park, Charlestown; Referee: R Hickey
08/03/09; Round 3	T Mortimer (1-2), C Mortimer (0-3), M Ronaldson (0-2), A Kilcoyne (0-1), M Sweeney (0-1), P Gardiner (0-1), T Cunniffe (0-1), T Parsons (0-1)		D Glennon (0-4), M Ennis (0-2), F Boyle (0-1), F Spollen (0-1)	Fr O'Hara Park, Charlestown; Referee: R Hickey

08/03/09; Round 3	Derry	0-10 - 0-12	Kerry	Páirc Seán de Brún, Bellaghy; Referee: J McQuillan
08/03/09; Round 3	J Kielt (0-5), E Bradley (0-1), E Brown (0-1), J Diver (0-1), P Cartin (0-1), G O'Kane (0-1)		C Cooper (0-6), P Galvin (0-2), M Quirke (0-1), A O'Mahony (0-1), Declan O'Sullivan (0-1), Darren O'Sullivan (0-1)	Páirc Seán de Brún, Bellaghy; Referee: J McQuillan

08/03/09; Round 3	Donegal	1-8 - 0-13	Dublin	Fr Tierney Park, Ballyshannon; Referee: M Duffy
08/03/09; Round 3	C Dunne (1-0), M Murphy (0-2), S Griffin (0-2), B Boyle (0-1), C Bonner (0-1), D Gallagher (0-1), D Walsh (0-1)		C Keaney (0-4), B Brogan (0-3), R McConnell (0-3), D Henry (0-1), G Brennan (0-1), K Bonner (0-1)	Fr Tierney Park, Ballyshannon; Referee: M Duffy

14/03/09; Round 4	Dublin	1-12 - 0-20	Derry	Parnell Park, Dublin; Referee: J Bannon
14/03/09; Round 4	B Brogan (0-5), C Keaney (0-3), G Brennan (1-0), B Kelly (0-2), A Brogan (0-1), D Connolly (0-1)		E Bradley (0-6), Paddy Bradley (0-4), E. Muldoon (0-3), P Murphy (0-3), B McGuigan (0-2), B McGoldrick (0-1), B Mullan (0-1)	Parnell Park, Dublin; Referee: J Bannon

15/03/09; Round 4	Galway	1-16 - 0-12	Donegal	Pearse Stadium, Salthill; Referee: P McEneaney
15/03/09; Round 4	M Meehan (1-9), D Dunleavy (0-2), G Bradshaw (0-2), N Joyce (0-1), P Joyce (0-1), S Armstrong (0-1)		K Bonner (0-3), C Toye (0-2), E Wade (0-2), M Murphy (0-2), C McFadden (0-1), D Walsh (0-1), S Griffin (0-1)	Pearse Stadium, Salthill; Referee: P McEneaney

15/03/09; Round 4	Westmeath	2-10 - 1-15	Tyrone	Cusack Park, Mullingar; Referee: D Fahy
15/03/09; Round 4	D Glennon (1-6), M Ennis (1-0), N Kilcoyne (0-2), C Lynam (0-1), C Reilly (0-1)		S Cavanagh (0-5), C Cavanagh (1-0), C McCullagh (0-2), D Harte (0-2), N Gormley (0-2)	Cusack Park, Mullingar; Referee: D Fahy

15/03/09; Round 4	Kerry	0-13 - 0-11	Mayo	Austin Stack Park, Tralee; Referee: P Fox
15/03/09; Round 4	C Cooper (0-8), K Donaghy (0-2), D O'Sullivan (0-2), M Quirke (0-1)		A O'Malley (0-3), A Moran (0-2), T Mortimer (0-2), A Dillon (0-1), A Kilcoyne (0-1), P Harte (0-1), R McGarrity (0-1)	Austin Stack Park, Tralee; Referee: P Fox

21/03/09; Round 5	Donegal	0-11 - 0-8	Tyrone	MacCumhail Park, Ballybofey
21/03/09; Round 5	S Griffin (0-5), M Maguire (0-2), B Roper (0-1), C Toye (0-1), D Walsh (0-1), M Doherty (0-1)		S Cavanagh (0-3), C McCullagh (0-2), B McGuigan (0-1), O Mulligan (0-1), R Mellon (0-1)	MacCumhail Park, Ballybofey

22/03/09; Round 5	Mayo	0-9 - 0-9	Dublin	James Stephens Park, Ballina; Referee: P Hughes
22/03/09; Round 5	A Dillon (0-5), A O'Malley (0-1), A O'Shea (0-1), C Mortimer (0-1), P Harte (0-1)		D Connolly (0-5), B Brogan (0-2), B Cahill (0-1), C Keaney (0-1)	James Stephens Park, Ballina; Referee: P Hughes

22/03/09; Round 5	Kerry	1-12 - 0-6	Westmeath	Austin Stack Park, Tralee; Referee: M Deegan
22/03/09; Round 5	K Donaghy (1-1), P O'Connor (0-3), B Sheehan (0-2), D Walsh (0-1), Darren O'Sullivan (0-1), K O'Leary (0-1), S O'Sullivan (0-1), S Scanlon (0-1), T O Sé (0-1)		D Glennon (0-5), D Harte (0-1)	Austin Stack Park, Tralee; Referee: M Deegan

22/03/09; Round 5	Derry	0-13 - 2-7	Galway	Watty Graham Park, Maghera; Referee: C Reilly
22/03/09; Round 5	Paddy Bradley (0-7), E. Muldoon (0-2), SL McGoldrick (0-2), P Cartin (0-1), P Young (0-1)		M Meehan (1-5), P Conroy (1-0), C Bane (0-2)	Watty Graham Park, Maghera; Referee: C Reilly

28/03/09; Round 6	Tyrone	0-14 - 0-11	Derry	Healy Park, Omagh; Referee: D Coldrick
28/03/09; Round 6	T McGuigan (0-5), D Harte (0-2), O Mulligan (0-2), S Cavanagh (0-2), C McCullagh (0-1), K Hughes (0-1), S O'Neill (0-1)		Paddy Bradley (0-6), B McGoldrick (0-1), E Bradley (0-1), P Murphy (0-1)	Healy Park, Omagh; Referee: D Coldrick

29/03/09; Round 6	Galway	0-13 - 1-11	Mayo	St Jarlath's Park, Tuam; Referee: J McQuillan
29/03/09; Round 6	M Meehan (0-7), P Conroy (0-3), J Bergin (0-2), B Cullinane (0-1)		A O'Shea (1-1), A O'Malley (0-3), C Mortimer (0-2), P Gardiner (0-2), A Dillon (0-1), K McLoughlin (0-1), T Mortimer (0-1)	St Jarlath's Park, Tuam; Referee: J McQuillan

29/03/09; Round 6	Westmeath	1-7 - 0-15	Donegal	Cusack Park, Mullingar; Referee: A Mangan
29/03/09; Round 6	D Glennon (0-3), N Kilcoyne (1-0), M Ennis (0-2), D Bannon (0-1), D Harte (0-1)		C Toye (0-3), R Bradley (0-3), B Boyle (0-2), B Roper (0-1), C Dunne (0-1), D Walsh (0-1), M Doherty (0-1), M Hegarty (0-1), R Kavanagh (0-1), S Griffin (0-1)	Cusack Park, Mullingar; Referee: A Mangan

29/03/09; Round 6	Dublin	1-15 - 1-15	Kerry	Parnell Park, Dublin; Referee: P McEnaney
29/03/09; Round 6	M Davoren (1-3), D Connolly (0-4), C Keaney (0-2), P Andrews (0-2), R McConnell (0-2), D Henry (0-1), P Burke (0-1)		C Cooper (0-3), A O'Mahony (1-0), B Sheehan (0-2), D Moran (0-2), D O'Sullivan (0-2), T Walsh (0-2), K Donaghy (0-1), P Galvin (0-1), S O'Sullivan (0-1), T O Sé (0-1)	Parnell Park, Dublin; Referee: P McEnaney

12/04/09; Round 7	Dublin	5-22 - 0-10	Westmeath	Parnell Park, Dublin; Referee: G O Conamha
12/04/09; Round 7	C Keaney (1-7), B Kelly (0-6), A Brogan (0-4), C Whelan (1-0), D Magee (1-0), P Burke (1-0), P Flynn (1-0), B Cahill (0-2), M Davoren (0-2), G Brennan (0-1)		D Glennon (0-6), K Scally (0-1), N Kilcoyne (0-1), P Bannon (0-1), T McDaniel (0-1)	Parnell Park, Dublin; Referee: G O Conamha

12/04/09; Round 7	Kerry	2-15 - 1-11	Galway	Austin Stack Park, Tralee; Referee: M Duffy
12/04/09; Round 7	C Cooper (0-5), K Donaghy (1-1), T Walsh (1-1), P Galvin (0-3), Declan O'Sullivan (0-2), S O'Sullivan (0-1)		M Meehan (0-8), P Joyce (1-2), G Bradshaw (0-1)	Austin Stack Park, Tralee; Referee: M Duffy

12/04/09; Round 7	Mayo	1-11 - 0-14	Tyrone	MacHale Park, Castlebar; Referee: P McEneaney
12/04/09; Round 7	A O'Shea (1-1), A O'Malley (0-3), R McGarrity (0-3), A Moran (0-1), C Mortimer (0-1), P Harte (0-1), T Mortimer (0-1)		M Penrose (0-6), S Cavanaugh (0-2), C Gormley (0-1), D Harte (0-1), E McGinley (0-1), N Gormley (0-1), R Mellon (0-1), S O'Neill (0-1)	MacHale Park, Castlebar; Referee: P McEneaney

12/04/09; Round 7	Derry	0-14 - 0-10	Donegal	Watty Graham Park, Maghera; Referee: P Hughes
12/04/09; Round 7	J Kielt (0-3), M Lynch (0-3), E Bradley (0-2), B McGoldrick (0-1), E Lynn (0-1), E. Muldoon (0-1), g McAlary (0-1), S Bradley (0-1)		M Doherty (0-6), B Roper (0-2), C Toye (0-1), M McGuire (0-1)	Watty Graham Park, Maghera; Referee: P Hughes

=== Division 1 Final ===
26/04/2009	Kerry	1-15 - 0-15	Derry	Croke Park, Dublin; Attendance: 20,547; Referee: M Duffy
26/04/2009	C Cooper (0-6), B Sheehan (0-3), D Walsh (1-0), T Walsh (0-2), T O Sé (0-2), A O'Mahony (0-1), Declan O'Sullivan (0-1)	Report	E Bradley (0-5), M Lynch (0-4), C McKaigue (0-1), E Lynn (0-1), J Kielt (0-1), P Bradley (0-1), P Murphy (0-1), S Bradley (0-1)	Croke Park, Dublin; Attendance: 20,547; Referee: M Duffy

== Division 2 ==
=== Table ===
Compete in Division 2 final and automatic promotion to Division 1 Automatic relegation to Division 3

Team	Pld	W	D	L	F	A	Diff	Pts
Monaghan	7	5	1	1	12-94	4-79	39	11
Cork	7	5	1	1	3-101	3-66	35	11
Kildare	7	4	2	1	6-97	5-73	27	10
Armagh	7	4	0	3	9-81	6-85	5	8
Meath	7	2	2	3	2-76	6-69	-5	6
Laois	7	3	0	4	5-81	8-92	-20	6
Fermanagh	7	1	1	5	7-66	2-100	-19	3
Wexford	7	0	1	6	3-69	13-101	-62	1

=== Rounds 1 to 7 ===
01/02/09; Round 1	Wexford	2-9 - 4-16	Armagh	Wexford Park, Wexford; Referee: M Condon
01/02/09; Round 1	C Lyng (0-4), P Colfer (1-1), S Cullen (0-3), D Fogarty (1-0), D Kinsella (0-1)		R Henderson (4-3), S Kernan (0-4), P Toal (0-3), A Kernan (0-2), B Mallon (0-1), K O'Rourke (0-1), Martin O'Rourke (0-1), Michael O'Rourke (0-1)	Wexford Park, Wexford; Referee: M Condon

01/02/09; Round 1	Fermanagh	1-10 - 2-12	Monaghan	Brewster Park, Enniskillen
01/02/09; Round 1	E Ferris (1-3), S O'Brien (0-3), D Keenan (0-1), E Maguire (0-1), P Sherry (0-1), T McElroy (0-1)		C McManus (1-3), P Finlay (0-4), M Downey (0-1), P McGuigan (0-1)	Brewster Park, Enniskillen

01/02/09; Round 1	Cork	1-15 - 0-9	Meath	Páirc Uí Chaoimh, Cork; Referee: S Doyle
01/02/09; Round 1	D Goulding (0-5), D O'Connor (0-4), P O'Neill (0-3), M Cussen (1-0), C McCarthy (0-2), F Goold (0-1)		C King (0-2), C Ward (0-2), C O'Connor (0-1), D Bray (0-1), D Sheridan (0-1), J Queeney (0-1), S Bray (0-1)	Páirc Uí Chaoimh, Cork; Referee: S Doyle

01/02/09; Round 1	Laois	1-8 - 0-18	Kildare	O'Moore Park, Portlaoise; Referee: P McEnaney
01/02/09; Round 1	B Quigley (1-1), R Munnelly (0-3), B McCormack (0-1), C Bergin (0-1), N Garvan (0-1), P Clancy (0-1)		J Doyle (0-6), E Callaghan (0-4), D Earley (0-2), A Smith (0-1), E O'Flaherty (0-1), H McGrillen (0-1), J Kavanagh (0-1), K Donnelly (0-1), R Sweeney (0-1)	O'Moore Park, Portlaoise; Referee: P McEnaney

14/02/09; Round 2	Armagh	2-8 - 2-11	Laois	Athletic Grounds, Armagh; Referee: Pat Fox
14/02/09; Round 2	R Clarke (1-2), F Moriarty (1-0), B Mallon (0-1), R Henderson (0-1), S McDonnell (0-1)		D Brennan (1-1), R Munnelly (0-3), P OLeary (1-0), B McCormack (0-2), M Tierney (0-2), P Clancy (0-1), P McMahon (0-1), P McNulty (0-1)	Athletic Grounds, Armagh; Referee: Pat Fox

14/02/09; Round 2	Meath	0-12 - 2-7	Fermanagh	Páirc Tailteann, Navan
14/02/09; Round 2	C Ward (0-3), D Bray (0-3), N Crawford (0-2), S Bray (0-2), J Queeney (0-1), C King (0-1)		J Sherry (1-0), D Killie (1-0), S O'Brien (0-3), E Ferris (0-2), E Maguire (0-1), R Foy (0-1)	Páirc Tailteann, Navan

15/02/09; Round 2	Kildare	0-14 - 0-14	Cork	St Conleth's Park, Newbridge; Referee: D Fahey
15/02/09; Round 2	J Doyle (0-5), J Kavanagh (0-4), P O'Neill (0-2), A Smith (0-1), D Earley (0-1), M Conway (0-1)		F Goold (0-4), D O'Connor (0-3), A O'Connor (0-1), C McCarthy (0-1), D Goulding (0-1), G Canty (0-1), K O'Sullivan (0-1), N OLeary (0-1), P Kerrigan (0-1)	St Conleth's Park, Newbridge; Referee: D Fahey

15/02/09; Round 2	Monaghan	2-17 - 1-12	Wexford	St Tiernach's Park, Clones; Referee: M Sludden
15/02/09; Round 2	T Freeman (1-3), C McManus (0-3), P Finlay (0-3), R Woods (0-3), P McGuigan (1-0), D Freeman (0-2), D Clerkin (0-1), G McEnaney (0-1), S Gollogly (0-1)		M Forde (1-6), PJ Banville (0-2), A Flynn (0-1), C Byrne (0-1), C Lyng (0-1), D Kinsella (0-1)	St Tiernach's Park, Clones; Referee: M Sludden

07/03/09; Round 3	Meath	1-8 - 0-6	Laois	Páirc Tailteann, Navan; Referee: J McKee
07/03/09; Round 3	B Meade (1-1), C Ward (0-3), S Bray (0-2), M Ward (0-1), S McAnarney (0-1)		MJ Tierney (0-5), C Bergin (0-1)	Páirc Tailteann, Navan; Referee: J McKee

08/03/09; Round 3	Cork	0-10 - 0-7	Fermanagh	Páirc Uí Chaoimh, Cork; Referee: M Condon
08/03/09; Round 3	C McCarthy (0-1), D Goulding (0-1), J Hayes (0-1), P Kerrigan (0-1)		D Keenan (0-2), J Sherry (0-1), T McElroy (0-1)	Páirc Uí Chaoimh, Cork; Referee: M Condon

08/03/09; Round 3	Kildare	2-16 - 0-8	Wexford	St Conleth's Park, Newbridge; Referee: C Reilly
08/03/09; Round 3	J Doyle (0-10), E Callaghan (1-2), A Smith (1-0), J Kavanagh (0-1)		S Cullen (0-3), C Lyng (0-2), P Colfer (0-2), C Byrne (0-1)	St Conleth's Park, Newbridge; Referee: C Reilly

08/03/09; Round 3	Armagh	0-14 - 1-13	Monaghan	Athletic Grounds, Armagh; Referee: Syl Doyle
08/03/09; Round 3	S McDonnell (0-5), C McKeever (0-2), R Clarke (0-2), B Shannon (0-1), C Vernon (0-1), R Henderson (0-1)		P Finlay (0-4), R Ronaghan (1-1), E Lennon (0-2), M Downey (0-2), R Woods (0-2), D Hughes (0-1), S Gollogly (0-1)	Athletic Grounds, Armagh; Referee: Syl Doyle

14/03/09; Round 4	Laois	0-9 - 0-18	Cork	O'Moore Park, Portlaoise; Referee: D Coldrick
14/03/09; Round 4	M Tierney (0-7), K Meaney (0-2)		J Hayes (0-2), C McCarthy (0-1), J Masters (0-1), M Cussen (0-1), M Shields (0-1)	O'Moore Park, Portlaoise; Referee: D Coldrick

14/03/09; Round 4	Fermanagh	0-10 - 0-11	Armagh	Nowlan Park, Kilkenny; Referee: R Hickey
14/03/09; Round 4	S O'Brien (0-5), E Maguire (0-2), J Sherry (0-1), R Foy (0-1), T McElroy (0-1)		S McDonnell (0-6), C Vernon (0-1), P Toal (0-1), R Clarke (0-1), R Henderson (0-1), S Forker (0-1)	Nowlan Park, Kilkenny; Referee: R Hickey

15/03/09; Round 4	Monaghan	1-11 - 1-14	Kildare	St Tiernach's Park, Clones; Referee: T Quigley
15/03/09; Round 4	T Freeman (1-4), R Woods (0-3), D Hughes (0-2), M Downey (0-1), P Finlay (0-1)		R Sweeney (1-1), J Doyle (0-3), A Smith (0-2), E Callaghan (0-2), M Scanlon (0-2), J Kavanagh (0-1), K Donnelly (0-1), K Ennis (0-1)	St Tiernach's Park, Clones; Referee: T Quigley

15/03/09; Round 4	Wexford	0-7 - 0-10	Meath	Wexford Park, Wexford; Referee: M Collins
15/03/09; Round 4	C Lyng (0-4), S Cullen (0-3)		C Ward (0-4), B Meade (0-1), M Ward (0-1), R Maguire (0-1), S Bray (0-1), S Kenny (0-1), S McAnarney (0-1)	Wexford Park, Wexford; Referee: M Collins

21/03/09; Round 5	Laois	0-23 - 1-14	Fermanagh	O'Moore Park, Portlaoise; Referee: M Condon
21/03/09; Round 5	MJ Tierney (0-9), R Munnelly (0-4), B McCormack (0-2), D Kingston (0-2), P Clancy (0-2), B Sheehan (0-1), D Rooney (0-1), P McMahon (0-1), P McNulty (0-1)		D Keenan (1-3), C McElroy (0-3), M Little (0-3), D Kelly (0-1), E Ferris (0-1), R Carson (0-1), R Keenan (0-1), T McElroy (0-1)	O'Moore Park, Portlaoise; Referee: M Condon

21/03/09; Round 5	Meath	0-12 - 0-12	Monaghan	Páirc Tailteann, Navan; Referee: M Duffy
21/03/09; Round 5	C Ward (0-6), S Bray (0-3), C King (0-2), S Kenny (0-1)		P Finlay (0-6), M Downey (0-2), C Hanratty (0-1), D Clerkin (0-1), D Mone (0-1), T Freeman (0-1)	Páirc Tailteann, Navan; Referee: M Duffy

22/03/09; Round 5	Kildare	1-10 - 1-12	Armagh	St Conleth's Park, Newbridge; Referee: M Duffy
22/03/09; Round 5	J Doyle (0-5), J Kavanagh (1-2), M Conway (0-2), P O'Neill (0-1)		R Clarke (0-4), A Kernan (0-3), A O'Rourke (1-0), K O'Rourke (0-2), S McDonnell (0-2), B Mallon (0-1)	St Conleth's Park, Newbridge; Referee: M Duffy

22/03/09; Round 5	Cork	1-16 - 0-7	Wexford	Páirc Uí Chaoimh, Cork; Referee: M Meade
22/03/09; Round 5	P Kerrigan (1-2), D Goulding (0-4), G Canty (0-2), P O'Flynn (0-2), A O'Connor (0-1), B O'Regan (0-1), F Goold (0-1), J Hayes (0-1), J Masters (0-1), K O'Sullivan (0-1)		C Lyng (0-2), S Cullen (0-2), A Flynn (0-1), C Morris (0-1), D Kinsella (0-1)	Páirc Uí Chaoimh, Cork; Referee: M Meade

29/03/09; Round 6	Wexford	0-10 - 2-16	Laois	Wexford Park, Wexford; Referee: P Hughes
29/03/09; Round 6	M Forde (0-4), S Roche (0-3), D Foran (0-2), D Kinsella (0-1)		MJ Tierney (0-6), P McMahon (1-2), D Kingston (1-1), B Sheehan (0-2), R Munnelly (0-2), C Bergin (0-1), P Clancy (0-1), P McNulty (0-1)	Wexford Park, Wexford; Referee: P Hughes

29/03/09; Round 6	Fermanagh	1-8 - 0-16	Kildare	Brewster Park, Enniskillen; Referee: D Fahy
29/03/09; Round 6	D Keenan (0-3), P Cadden (1-0), C McElroy (0-2), E Maguire (0-2), D Kille (0-1)		J Doyle (0-4), K Donnelly (0-3), P O'Neill (0-3), E Callaghan (0-2), R Kelly (0-2), M Harnett (0-1), R Sweeney (0-1)	Brewster Park, Enniskillen; Referee: D Fahy

29/03/09; Round 6	Monaghan	2-13 - 1-9	Cork	Páirc Mhuire, Scotstown; Referee: M Sludden
29/03/09; Round 6	P Finlay (0-6), T Freeman (1-1), R Ronaghan (1-0), D Hughes (0-1), E Lennon (0-1), G McQuaid (0-1), P McGuigan (0-1), R Woods (0-1), S Gollogly (0-1)		D Goulding (1-2), D O'Connor (0-2), J Hayes (0-1), J Masters (0-1), N Murphy (0-1), P Kerrigan (0-1), P O'Flynn (0-1)	Páirc Mhuire, Scotstown; Referee: M Sludden

29/03/09; Round 6	Armagh	1-13 - 0-13	Meath	St. Oliver Plunkett Park, Crossmaglen; Referee: G Kinneavey
29/03/09; Round 6	A Kernan (0-4), S McDonnell (0-4), F Moriarty (1-0), M O'Rourke (0-2), J Feeney (0-1), R Henderson (0-1), T Kernan (0-1)		C Ward (0-6), S Bray (0-3), M Ward (0-2), B Farrell (0-1)	St. Oliver Plunkett Park, Crossmaglen; Referee: G Kinneavey

12/04/09; Round 7	Wexford	0-16 - 2-10	Fermanagh	Wexford Park, Wexford; Referee: S Carroll
12/04/09; Round 7	C Lyng (0-4), A Morrissey (0-3), PJ Banville (0-3), S Roche (0-3), C Morris (0-1), G Molloy (0-1), N Murphy (0-1)		D Keenan (1-3), R Carson (1-3), R Keenan (0-2), M Jones (0-1), M Little (0-1)	Wexford Park, Wexford; Referee: S Carroll

12/04/09; Round 7	Laois	0-8 - 4-16	Monaghan	O'Moore Park, Portlaoise; Referee: A Mangan
12/04/09; Round 7	D Kingston (0-4), M Tierney (0-2), R Munnelly (0-2)		T Freeman (1-6), M Downey (1-2), D Freeman (1-1), P Finlay (1-1), S Gollogly (0-2), C McManus (0-1), D Clerkin (0-1), R Ronaghan (0-1)	O'Moore Park, Portlaoise; Referee: A Mangan

12/04/09; Round 7	Meath	1-12 - 2-9	Kildare	Páirc Tailteann, Navan; Referee: J McQuillan
12/04/09; Round 7	C Ward (0-5), B Farrell (0-3), J Queeney (1-0), S Bray (0-2)		J Doyle (0-4), M Conway (1-0), R Sweeney (1-0), K Donnelly (0-2), A Smith (0-1), M Foley (0-1), R Kelly (0-1)	Páirc Tailteann, Navan; Referee: J McQuillan

12/04/09; Round 7	Cork	0-19 - 1-7	Armagh	Páirc Uí Chaoimh, Cork; Referee: M Deegan
12/04/09; Round 7	P Kerrigan (0-5), J Hayes (0-4), D Goulding (0-3), D O'Connor (0-2), A O'Connor (0-1), J Masters (0-1), N Murphy (0-1), P Kelly (0-1), P O'Flynn (0-1)		S McDonnell (1-2), T Kernan (0-3), B Mallon (0-2)	Páirc Uí Chaoimh, Cork; Referee: M Deegan

=== Division 2 Final ===
26/04/09	Cork	1-14 - 0-12	Monaghan	Croke Park, Dublin; Referee: Syl Doyle
26/04/09	D Goulding (0-5), D O'Connor (0-3), J Masters (1-0), A O'Connor (0-1), G Canty (0-1), G Spillane (0-1), P Kelly (0-1), P Kerrigan (0-1), P O'Neill (0-1)	Report	P Finlay (0-4), T Freeman (0-4), C McManus (0-2), D McArdle (0-1), M Downey (0-1)	Croke Park, Dublin; Referee: Syl Doyle

== Division 3 ==
=== Table ===
Compete in Division 3 final and automatic promotion to Division 2 Automatic relegation to Division 4

Team	Pld	W	D	L	F	A	Diff	Pts
Down	7	5	0	2	4-96	5-72	21	10
Tipperary	7	5	0	2	5-89	4-78	14	10
Offaly	7	3	1	3	7-68	6-89	-18	7
Louth	7	3	0	4	6-91	5-83	11	6
Cavan	7	3	0	4	2-85	6-76	-3	6
Roscommon	7	3	0	4	3-82	2-88	-3	6
Limerick	7	3	0	4	6-66	6-74	-8	6
Longford	7	2	1	4	3-67	2-84	-14	5

=== Rounds 1 to 7 ===
01/02/09; Round 1	Tipperary	1-9 - 0-18	Down	Semple Stadium, Thurles; Referee: P McGovern
01/02/09; Round 1	B Grogan (0-6), C Aylward (1-0), T Dalton (0-2), K Mulryan (0-1)		D Hughes (0-4), J Fegan (0-4), B Coulter (0-3), A Carr (0-2), C Maginn (0-2), B McArdle (0-1), C Magee (0-1), J OReilly (0-1)	Semple Stadium, Thurles; Referee: P McGovern

01/02/09; Round 1	Roscommon	0-16 - 0-7	Offaly	Newpark, Kiltoom; Referee: J White
01/02/09; Round 1	G Heneghan (0-4), S Kilbride (0-4), D Keenehan (0-2), G Cox (0-2), B Higgins (0-1), C Devaney (0-1), K Mannion (0-1), S Purcell (0-1)		N Darby (0-2), PJ Ward (0-2), R Guinan (0-2), R Allen (0-1)	Newpark, Kiltoom; Referee: J White

01/02/09; Round 1	Longford	3-6 - 0-12	Cavan	Pearse Park, Longford; Referee: Michael Duffy
01/02/09; Round 1	P Shanley (1-1), C Flynn (1-0), S Doyle (1-0), F McGee (0-2), W Skelly (0-2), D Keenan (0-1)		G Pierson (0-6), M Reilly (0-4), E OReilly (0-1), S Johnston (0-1)	Pearse Park, Longford; Referee: Michael Duffy

01/02/09; Round 1	Louth	1-14 - 0-6	Limerick	Drogheda Park, Drogheda; Referee: M Sludden
01/02/09; Round 1	JP Rooney (1-3), R Carroll (0-3), B White (0-2), D Reid (0-2), A Reid (0-1), D Clarke (0-1), P Smith (0-1), S Lennon (0-1)		I Ryan (0-4), M Carrig (0-1), P Corrigan (0-1)	Drogheda Park, Drogheda; Referee: M Sludden

14/02/09; Round 2	Down	1-13 - 1-12	Louth	Páirc Esler, Newry; Referee: T Quigley
14/02/09; Round 2	D Hughes (1-2), B Coulter (0-4), A Carr (0-3), J Fegan (0-2), B McArdle (0-1), S Kearney (0-1)		B White (0-7), P Smith (1-1), S Lennon (0-2), D Reid (0-1)	Páirc Esler, Newry; Referee: T Quigley

14/02/09; Round 2	Limerick	0-14 - 1-10	Roscommon	FitzGerald Park, Kilmallock; Referee: M Collins
14/02/09; Round 2	G Collins (0-4), I Ryan (0-4), J Galvin (0-1), K O'Callaghan (0-1), P Browne (0-1), S Lavin (0-1), S Lucey (0-1), T Cahill (0-1)		G Cox (1-4), S Kilbride (0-2), F Cregg (0-1), G Heneghen (0-1), J Dunning (0-1), K Mannion (0-1)	FitzGerald Park, Kilmallock; Referee: M Collins

15/02/09; Round 2	Cavan	0-11 - 0-13	Tipperary	Breffni Park, Cavan
15/02/09; Round 2	G Pierson (0-5)	Report	B Grogan (0-7)	Breffni Park, Cavan

15/02/09; Round 2	Offaly	0-11 - 0-11	Longford	O'Connor Park, Tullamore; Referee: A Mangan
15/02/09; Round 2	C McManus (0-4), N Darby (0-3), J Reynolds (0-2), S Lonergan (0-2)		F McGee (0-6), W Skelly (0-2), C Mimnagh (0-1), E Williams (0-1), K Mulligan (0-1)	O'Connor Park, Tullamore; Referee: A Mangan

07/03/09; Round 3	Down	0-10 - 0-12	Cavan	Páirc Esler, Newry; Referee: D Coldrick
07/03/09; Round 3	A Carr (0-3), P McCumiskey (0-2), R Murtagh (0-2), C Maginn (0-1), D Hughes (0-1), J Fegan (0-1)		S Johnston (0-6), E Keating (0-3), L Reilly (0-2), R Cullivan (0-1)	Páirc Esler, Newry; Referee: D Coldrick

08/03/09; Round 3	Offaly	2-8 - 1-10	Louth	O'Connor Park, Tullamore; Referee: V Neary
08/03/09; Round 3	T Deehan (1-2), J Reynolds (1-0), N Darby (0-2), N McNamee (0-1), N Smith (0-1), R Guinan (0-1), S Ryan (0-1)		D Clarke (1-2), R Carroll (0-3), B White (0-2), JP Rooney (0-2), P Smith (0-1)	O'Connor Park, Tullamore; Referee: V Neary

08/03/09; Round 3	Limerick	1-10 - 1-11	Tipperary	FitzGerald Park, Kilmallock; Referee: E Kinsella
08/03/09; Round 3	I Ryan (1-4), E Hogan (0-2), JB Murphy (0-2), C Joyce-Power (0-1), G Collins (0-1)		B Grogan (1-5), P Austin (0-3), J Tierney (0-2), S Carey (0-1)	FitzGerald Park, Kilmallock; Referee: E Kinsella

08/03/09; Round 3	Roscommon	1-12 - 0-13	Longford	Dr. Hyde Park, Roscommon; Referee: M Higgins
08/03/09; Round 3	D Shine (0-5), S Kilbride (0-5), S Purcell (1-0), B Higgins (0-1), F Cregg (0-1)		P Barden (0-4), W Skelly (0-4), D Barden (0-1), D Farrell (0-1), F McGee (0-1), P Berry (0-1), P Shanley (0-1)	Dr. Hyde Park, Roscommon; Referee: M Higgins

14/03/09; Round 4	Cavan	0-10 - 0-9	Limerick	Breffni Park, Cavan; Referee: M Duffy
14/03/09; Round 4	M Reilly (0-3), L Mulvey (0-2), S Johnston (0-2), C Galligan (0-1), C Mackey (0-1), J McCutcheon (0-1)		I Ryan (0-5), S Kelly (0-2), S Buckley (0-1), S Gallagher (0-1)	Breffni Park, Cavan; Referee: M Duffy

15/03/09; Round 4	Tipperary	1-16 - 1-8	Offaly	Semple Stadium, Thurles; Referee: M Higgins
15/03/09; Round 4	B Coen (1-3), B Grogan (0-5), J Tierney (0-3), S Carey (0-2), A Moloney (0-1), B Fox (0-1), P Austin (0-1)		N McNamee (1-3), N Darby (0-3), C McManus (0-1), J Reynolds (0-1)	Semple Stadium, Thurles; Referee: M Higgins

15/03/09; Round 4	Louth	0-10 - 0-13	Roscommon	Drogheda Park, Drogheda; Referee: F Flynn
15/03/09; Round 4	B White (0-4), D Clarke (0-2), D Crilly (0-2), P McGinnity (0-1), S Lennon (0-1)		D Shine (0-5), G Cox (0-2), K Mannion (0-2), S Kilbride (0-2), G Heneghan (0-1), J Dunning (0-1)	Drogheda Park, Drogheda; Referee: F Flynn

15/03/09; Round 4	Longford	0-8 - 0-12	Down	Pearse Park, Longford; Referee: M Meade
15/03/09; Round 4	F McGee (0-4), C Mimnagh (0-1), P Dowd (0-1), P Shanley (0-1), W Skelly (0-1)		J Fegan (0-5), D Hughes (0-3), J Boyle (0-1), R Murtagh (0-1), S Kearney (0-1)	Pearse Park, Longford; Referee: M Meade

22/03/09; Round 5	Offaly	1-16 - 0-13	Cavan	O'Connor Park, Tullamore; Referee: S Doyle
22/03/09; Round 5	N Darby (0-6), C McManus (0-4), N McNamee (0-4), J Reynolds (1-0), M Mitchell (0-1), T Deehan (0-1)		L Reilly (0-4), S Johnston (0-4), E O'Reilly (0-1), J McCutcheon (0-1), L Mulvey (0-1), M Reilly (0-1), R Flanagan (0-1)	O'Connor Park, Tullamore; Referee: S Doyle

22/03/09; Round 5	Louth	0-18 - 0-12	Longford	Drogheda Park, Drogheda; Referee: P Fox
22/03/09; Round 5	B White (0-5), D Clarke (0-4), R Carroll (0-4), JP Rooney (0-2), R Finnegan (0-2)		B Kavanagh (0-3), G Dennigan (0-3), K Mulligan (0-3), D Barden (0-1), P Barden (0-1), P Berry (0-1)	Drogheda Park, Drogheda; Referee: P Fox

22/03/09; Round 5	Limerick	2-9 - 1-11	Down	Gaelic Grounds, Limerick; Referee: D Corcoran
22/03/09; Round 5	I Ryan (1-3), J Galvin (1-0), G Collins (0-2), K O'Callaghan (0-2), S Kelly (0-2)		P McCumiskey (1-2), A Carr (0-3), D Hughes (0-3), B Coulter (0-1), H Davey (0-1), J Fegan (0-1)	Gaelic Grounds, Limerick; Referee: D Corcoran

22/03/09; Round 5	Roscommon	1-10 - 2-13	Tipperary	Dr. Hyde Park, Roscommon; Referee: G McCormack
22/03/09; Round 5	G Heneghan (1-2), J Dunning (0-3), K Mannion (0-2), S O'Neill (0-2), S Kilbride (0-1)		B Grogan (0-8), B Mulvihill (1-0), C Aylward (1-0), P Austin (0-2), G Hannigan (0-1), S Carey (0-1), S Murphy (0-1)	Dr. Hyde Park, Roscommon; Referee: G McCormack

28/03/09; Round 6	Down	2-15 - 1-7	Offaly	Páirc Esler, Newry; Referee: J White
28/03/09; Round 6	P McComiskey (0-5), B Coulter (0-4), R Murtagh (1-1), D Hughes (0-3), S Kearney (1-0), A Carr (0-1), P Fitzpatrick (0-1)		N McNamee (1-1), C McManus (0-2), N Darby (0-2), S Ryan (0-1), T Deehan (0-1)	Páirc Esler, Newry; Referee: J White

28/03/09; Round 6	Longford	0-7 - 1-10	Limerick	Pearse Park, Longford; Referee: M Deegan
28/03/09; Round 6	G Dennigan (0-4), B Kavanagh (0-1), F McGee (0-1), K Mulligan (0-1)		K O'Callaghan (0-4), G Collins (0-2), I Ryan (0-1), J O'Donovan (0-1), S Buckley (0-1), S Lavin (0-1)	Pearse Park, Longford; Referee: M Deegan

29/03/09; Round 6	Cavan	0-14 - 0-6	Roscommon	Breffni Park, Cavan; Referee: R Hickey
29/03/09; Round 6	S Johnston (0-7), C Galligan (0-2), E Keating (0-1), J Reilly (0-1), L Reilly (0-1), M Lyng (0-1), M Reilly (0-1)		S Kilbride (0-4), G Heneghan (0-1), S Purcell (0-1)	Breffni Park, Cavan; Referee: R Hickey

29/03/09; Round 6	Tipperary	0-18 - 1-11	Louth	Semple Stadium, Thurles; Referee: J Bannon
29/03/09; Round 6	B Grogan (0-8), B Coen (0-4), D O'Brien (0-3), B Mulvihill (0-1), G Hannigan (0-1), N Fitzgerald (0-1)		D Clarke (1-5), R Carroll (0-2), S Lennon (0-2), D Crilly (0-1), D Reid (0-1)	Semple Stadium, Thurles; Referee: J Bannon

12/04/09; Round 7	Roscommon	0-15 - 0-17	Down	Dr. Hyde Park, Roscommon; Referee: R O'Donnell
12/04/09; Round 7	S Kilbride (0-5), D Shine (0-4), B Higgins (0-1), D Keenan (0-1), G Cox (0-1), K Higgins (0-1), K Mannion (0-1), S McDermott (0-1)		P McCumiskey (0-4), A Carr (0-3), D Hughes (0-3), B Coulter (0-2), C McGovern (0-1), D Rooney (0-1), J Boyle (0-1), J Fegan (0-1), S Kearney (0-1)	Dr. Hyde Park, Roscommon; Referee: R O'Donnell

12/04/09; Round 7	Louth	2-16 - 2-13	Cavan	Drogheda Park, Drogheda; Referee: M Sludden
12/04/09; Round 7	D Clarke (1-5), R Carroll (1-2), D Reid (0-3), P Keenan (0-3), B White (0-1), C Judge (0-1), G Hoey (0-1)		S Johnston (0-6), M Lyng (1-0), P Reilly (1-0), E O'Reilly (0-2), D McCabe (0-1), E Keating (0-1), M Reilly (0-1), P Brady (0-1), R Flanagan (0-1)	Drogheda Park, Drogheda; Referee: M Sludden

12/04/09; Round 7	Tipperary	0-9 - 0-10	Longford	Semple Stadium, Thurles; Referee: M Collins
12/04/09; Round 7	B Coen (0-4), D O'Brien (0-2), I Barnes (0-2), B Mulvihill (0-1)		B Kavanagh (0-5), K Smith (0-2), P Barden (0-2), P Berry (0-1)	Semple Stadium, Thurles; Referee: M Collins

12/04/09; Round 7	Offaly	2-11 - 2-8	Limerick	O'Connor Park, Tullamore; Referee: F Flynn
12/04/09; Round 7	J Reynolds (1-2), N McNamee (1-2), PJ Ward (0-2), T Deehan (0-2), B Darby (0-1), C McManus (0-1), K Slattery (0-1)		I Ryan (0-5), G Collins (1-1), S Buckley (1-0), M Crowley (0-1), S Kelly (0-1)	O'Connor Park, Tullamore; Referee: F Flynn

=== Division 3 Final ===
25/04/09	Tipperary	0-18 – 1-14 (A.E.T.)	Down	Pearse Park, Longford; Referee: Cormac Reilly
25/04/09	B Grogan (0-5), B Coen (0-4), J Tierney (0-3), B Mulvihill (0-2), C Aylward (0-1), D O'Brien (0-1), J Cagney (0-1), S Carey (0-1)	Report	A Carr (0-5), R Murtagh (1-1), D Gordon (0-2), D Hughes (0-2), B McArdle (0-1), C Garvey (0-1), C Magee (0-1), J Boyle (0-1)	Pearse Park, Longford; Referee: Cormac Reilly

== Division 4 ==
=== Table ===
Compete in Division 4 final and automatic promotion to Division 3

Team	Pld	W	D	L	F	A	Diff	Pts
Antrim	8	6	2	0	14-122	7-56	87	14
Sligo	8	7	0	1	12-99	5-66	54	14
Leitrim	8	5	1	2	13-89	11-68	27	11
Waterford	8	4	1	3	9-85	1-84	25	9
Wicklow	8	3	2	3	9-108	6-84	33	8
Clare	8	3	0	5	14-100	6-87	37	6
Carlow	8	3	0	5	7-93	12-83	-5	6
London	8	2	0	6	5-67	13-109	-66	4
Kilkenny	8	0	0	8	1-39	23-165	-192	0

=== Rounds 1 to 7 ===
01/02/09; Round 1	Sligo	3-20 - 0-4	Kilkenny	Markievicz Park, Sligo; Referee: V Neary
01/02/09; Round 1	A Marren (2-4), D McTernan (1-4), A Costello (0-3), K Sweeney (0-3), K Raymond (0-2), G Gaughan (0-1), S Davey (0-1), S Stenson (0-1), T Taylor (0-1)		D McCormack (0-2), P Grace (0-1), R Shore (0-1)	Markievicz Park, Sligo; Referee: V Neary

01/02/09; Round 1	Carlow	0-10 - 0-12	Clare	Dr Cullen Park, Carlow; Referee: P Hughes
01/02/09; Round 1	E McCormack (0-3), M Carpenter (0-3), B Murphy (0-1), J Kavanagh (0-1), J Murphy (0-1), JJ Smith (0-1)		D Tubridy (0-5), D Russell (0-2), C O'Connor (0-1), F ODea (0-1), M OShea (0-1), S Collins (0-1), S Monaghan (0-1)	Dr Cullen Park, Carlow; Referee: P Hughes

01/02/09; Round 1	London	2-7 - 2-12	Leitrim	Emerald GAA Grounds, Ruislip; Referee: T Quigley
01/02/09; Round 1	C Eastwood (0-4); P Friel (1-1), M McGill (1-0), E O'Cuiv (0-1), A Casey (0-1)		E Mulligan (0-7), D Gilhooly (1-0), D Maxwell (1-0), D O'Donnell (0-2); R Cox (0-1), D O'Connor (0-1), S Foley (0-1)	Emerald GAA Grounds, Ruislip; Referee: T Quigley

01/02/09; Round 1	Antrim	0-15 - 3-6	Wicklow	Casement Park, Belfast; Referee: J McKee
01/02/09; Round 1	M McCann (0-4), C Murray (0-2), K Close (0-2), P Cunningham (0-2), C McGourty (0-1), J Loughery (0-1), K Brady (0-1), T McCann (0-1), T Scullion (0-1)		S Furlong (2-1), T Hannon (0-5), D Odlum (1-0)	Casement Park, Belfast; Referee: J McKee

07/02/09; Round 2	Wicklow	0-15 - 2-9	Waterford	Aughrim County Ground, Aughrim; Referee: P Fox
07/02/09; Round 2	J McGrath (0-3), P Earls (0-3), T Hannon (0-3), C Walsh (0-2), D Odlum (0-2), L Glynn (0-2)		B Wall (0-5), C McGrath (0-1), E Rockett (0-1)	Aughrim County Ground, Aughrim; Referee: P Fox

07/02/09; Round 2	Kilkenny	0-5 - 4-27	Antrim	Nowlan Park, Kilkenny; Referee: D Brazil
07/02/09; Round 2	D McCormack (0-4), C Roche (0-1)		CJ McGourty (3-5), P Cunningham (0-9), C Close (1-3), M McCann (0-4), A Gallagher (0-1), C Murray (0-1), J Loughry (0-1), K Brady (0-1), M Dougan (0-1), M. Pollock (0-1)	Nowlan Park, Kilkenny; Referee: D Brazil

07/02/09; Round 2	Clare	2-9 - 1-13	Sligo	Cooraclare GAA Ground, Cooraclare; Referee: P O'Sullivan
07/02/09; Round 2	D Tubridy (0-5), D Russell (1-0), P Reidy (1-0), S Moloney (0-2), C Whelan (0-1), T Ryan (0-1)		A Marren (1-4), A Costello (0-3), S Davey (0-2), D Kelly (0-1), D McTernan (0-1), K Sweeney (0-1), M McNamara (0-1)	Cooraclare GAA Ground, Cooraclare; Referee: P O'Sullivan

14/02/09; Round 2	Antrim	1-14 - 1-7	Clare	Casement Park, Belfast; Referee: P Kneel
14/02/09; Round 2	P Cunningham (1-8), CJ McGourty (0-2), M McCann (0-2), B Hasson (0-1), D McCann (0-1)		D Tubridy (0-5), S Moloney (1-1), M OShea (0-1)	Casement Park, Belfast; Referee: P Kneel

15/02/09; Round 3	Carlow	2-14 - 0-14	London	Dr Cullen Park, Carlow; Referee: E Craul
15/02/09; Round 3	B Murphy (2-1), J Kavanagh (0-5), M Carpenter (0-3), P Broderick (0-2), E McCormack (0-1), J Murphy (0-1), K Nolan (0-1)		C Eastwood (0-4), M Hughes (0-3), P Duffy (0-3), A Casey (0-2), J Cott (0-2)	Dr Cullen Park, Carlow; Referee: E Craul

15/02/09; Round 3	Waterford	2-20 - 0-3	Kilkenny	Páirc Naomh Brid, Leamybrien
15/02/09; Round 3	B Wall (1-8), S Fleming (0-3), S OHare (0-3), B Phelan (0-1), L Lawlor (0-1), S Cunningham (0-1)		C Roche (0-1), D McCormack (0-1)	Páirc Naomh Brid, Leamybrien

15/02/09; Round 3	Sligo	4-14 - 1-8	Leitrim	Markievicz Park, Sligo; Referee: P Daly
15/02/09; Round 3	K Sweeney (2-2), A Marren (1-4), A Costello (0-4), S Davey (1-0), D Kelly (0-2), D McTernan (0-2)		E Mulligan (0-5), P McGuinness (1-0), R Cox (0-2), D Gilhooly (0-1)	Markievicz Park, Sligo; Referee: P Daly

22/02/09; Round 3	Leitrim	1-12 - 0-7	Carlow	Páirc Seán Mac Diarmada, Carrick-on-Shannon; Referee: A McAlynn
22/02/09; Round 3	E Mulligan (0-6), R Cox (0-3), D Maxwell (1-0), T Beirne (0-2), P McGuinness (0-1)		E McCormack (0-5), S Gannon (0-2)	Páirc Seán Mac Diarmada, Carrick-on-Shannon; Referee: A McAlynn

08/03/09; Round 4	Kilkenny	0-3 - 1-24	Wicklow	Nowlan Park, Kilkenny; Referee: S Carroll
08/03/09; Round 4	C Roche (0-2), D Lyng (0-1)		S Furlong (1-7), D Odlum (2-4), T Hannon (1-4), L Glynn (0-4), JP Dalton (1-0), J McGrath (0-2), P McWalter (0-1), R Nolan (0-1)	Nowlan Park, Kilkenny; Referee: S Carroll

08/03/09; Round 4	Clare	0-12 - 0-15	Waterford	Cusack Park, Ennis; Referee: B Tyrell
08/03/09; Round 4	D Tubridy (0-6), S Collins (0-2), D Russell (0-1), S Moloney (0-1)		B Wall (0-8), G Power (0-1), M Ahearne (0-1), S Fleming (0-1)	Cusack Park, Ennis; Referee: B Tyrell

08/03/09; Round 4	London	0-5 - 2-6	Sligo	Emerald GAA Grounds, Ruislip

08/03/09; Round 4	Leitrim	2-6 - 1-9	Antrim	Páirc Seán Mac Diarmada, Carrick-on-Shannon; Referee: B Crowe
08/03/09; Round 4	E Mulligan (1-4), J Glancy (1-1), D O'Connor (0-1)		J Crozier (1-1), CJ McGourty (0-3), C Close (0-2), D McCann (0-1), K Brady (0-1), M McCann (0-1)	Páirc Seán Mac Diarmada, Carrick-on-Shannon; Referee: B Crowe

15/03/09; Round 5	London	0-9 - 0-8	Waterford	Emerald GAA Grounds, Ruislip; Referee: E Craul
15/03/09; Round 5	C Eastwood (0-3), P Duffy (0-3), C Donnellan (0-2), E Gallagher (0-1)		B Wall (0-2), S Fleming (0-2), M Aherne (0-1)	Emerald GAA Grounds, Ruislip; Referee: E Craul

15/03/09; Round 5	Leitrim	0-13 - 0-11	Wicklow	Páirc Seán Mac Diarmada, Carrick-on-Shannon; Referee: R O Donnell
15/03/09; Round 5	M Foley (0-4), R Cox (0-4), D Maxwell (0-2), B Gallagher (0-1), B McWeeney (0-1), P McGuinness (0-1)		T Hannon (0-4), D Odlum (0-2), J McGrath (0-2), S Furlong (0-2), L Glynn (0-1)	Páirc Seán Mac Diarmada, Carrick-on-Shannon; Referee: R O Donnell

15/03/09; Round 5	Clare	5-21 - 0-4	Kilkenny	Cusack Park, Ennis; Referee: P Sheehy
15/03/09; Round 5	D Tubridy (2-6), E Coughlan (0-5), S Moloney (0-4), T Ryan (1-1), G Quinlan (0-3), G Brennan (1-0), E Lyons (0-1)		M Sanders (0-3), M Malley (0-1)	Cusack Park, Ennis; Referee: P Sheehy

15/03/09; Round 5	Carlow	1-11 - 4-14	Antrim	Dr Cullen Park, Carlow
15/03/09; Round 5	J Murphy (1-1), D Hayden (0-2), B Murphy (0-2), E McCormack (0-2), M Carpenter (0-2), D Phelan (0-1), R Walker (0-1)	Report	M Dougan (3-1), CJ McGourty (1-4), T McCann (0-2), J Loughrey (0-1), K McQuillan (0-1), M McCann (0-1), A Gallagher (0-1), M Pollard (0-1), D Edwards (0-1), J Crozier (0-1)	Dr Cullen Park, Carlow

22/03/09; Round 5	Waterford	3-7 - 1-10	Leitrim	Walsh Park, Waterford; Referee: B Ó Tirial
22/03/09; Round 5	B Wall (0-4), T O'Gorman (1-0), Michael O'Gorman (0-1), S Fleming (0-1), W Hennessy (0-1)		E Mulligan (0-4), D Reynolds (1-0), R Cox (0-2), B Gallagher (0-1), G McCluskey (0-1), M Foley (0-1), P McGuinness (0-1)	Walsh Park, Waterford; Referee: B Ó Tirial

22/03/09; Round 6	Sligo	2-8 - 0-8	Carlow	Markievicz Park, Sligo; Referee: B Crowe
22/03/09; Round 6	D Kelly (2-3), A Costello (0-3), D McTernan (0-2)		E McCormack (0-5), J Murphy (0-1), JJ Smith (0-1), W Minchin (0-1)	Markievicz Park, Sligo; Referee: B Crowe

22/03/09; Round 6	Antrim	3-20 - 0-4	London	Casement Park, Belfast

22/03/09; Round 6	Wicklow	1-15 - 2-9	Clare	Aughrim County Ground, Aughrim; Referee: J McKee
22/03/09; Round 6	S Furlong (1-1), P Earls (0-3), T Hannon (0-3), D Odlum (0-2), L Glynn (0-2), P McWalter (0-2), D O'Sullivan (0-1)		S Moloney (0-3), D Russell (1-0), G Brennan (1-0), D Tubridy (0-2), S Collins (0-2), E Coughlin (0-1), N Considine (0-1)	Aughrim County Ground, Aughrim; Referee: J McKee

28/03/09; Round 6	Waterford	1-7 - 0-6	Carlow	Fraher Field, Dungarvan

28/03/09; Round 6	Antrim	1-11 - 0-9	Sligo	Casement Park, Belfast; Referee: C Reilly
28/03/09; Round 6	P Cunningham (1-2), M Dougan (0-2), M McCann (0-2), N McKeever (0-2), T McCann (0-2), T Scullion (0-1)		A Marren (0-3), D Kelly (0-2), D McTernan (0-1), K Sweeney (0-1), S Gilmartin (0-1), T Taylor (0-1)	Casement Park, Belfast; Referee: C Reilly

29/03/09; Round 7	Wicklow	1-20 - 0-9	London	Aughrim County Ground, Aughrim

29/03/09; Round 7	Kilkenny	0-4 - 4-19	Leitrim	Páirc Lachtain, Freshford

12/04/09; Round 8	Leitrim	2-9 - 1-9	Clare	Páirc Sean Seán Diarmada, Carrick-on-Shannon; Referee: D Corcoran
12/04/09; Round 8	J Glancy (0-5), C Clarke (1-1), S Canning (1-0), D Maxwell (0-1), D Reynolds (0-1), R Cox (0-1)		G Brennan (1-2), E Coughlan (0-2), T Ryan (0-2), D Tubridy (0-1), F O'Dea (0-1), M O'Shea (0-1)	Páirc Sean Seán Diarmada, Carrick-on-Shannon; Referee: D Corcoran

12/04/09; Round 8	Carlow	2-15 - 3-7	Wicklow	Dr Cullen Park, Carlow; Referee: J Bannon
12/04/09; Round 8	E McCormack (1-6), J Kavanagh (0-5), D Hayden (1-0), B Murphy (0-1), M Carpenter (0-1)		C McNicholas (1-0), S Furlong (1-0), D Odlum (0-2), J McGrath (0-1)	Dr Cullen Park, Carlow; Referee: J Bannon

12/04/09; Round 8	London	2-12 - 0-7	Kilkenny	Emerald GAA Grounds, Ruislip; Referee: G Walsh
12/04/09; Round 8	C Donnellan (0-6), E Gallagher (1-2), A Casey (1-0), P Duffy (0-2), E O'Cuiv (0-1), K Phair (0-1)		G Lawlor (0-3), JJ Dunphy (0-2), D Lyng (0-1), M Malone (0-1)	Emerald GAA Grounds, Ruislip; Referee: G Walsh

12/04/09; Round 8	Sligo	0-16 - 1-11	Waterford	Markievicz Park, Sligo; Referee: A McAlynn
12/04/09; Round 8	A Marren (0-7), A Costello (0-3), S Davey (0-2), S Stenson (0-2), D Kelly (0-1), T Taylor (0-1)		B Wall (0-5), S Walsh (1-1), S O'Hehir (0-3), G Hurney (0-1)	Markievicz Park, Sligo; Referee: A McAlynn

18/04/09; Round 8	Clare	3-21 - 1-7	London	Cusack Park, Ennis; Referee: R Moloney
18/04/09; Round 8	D Tubridy (1-5), E Coughlan (1-4), M O'Shea (0-3), G Brennan (1-0), C O'Connor (0-2), L Markham (0-2), S Collins (0-2), T Ryan (0-2), D Russell (0-1)		K Downes (0-4), E Gallagher (1-1), A Moyles (0-2)	Cusack Park, Ennis; Referee: R Moloney

18/04/09; Round 8	Waterford	0-8 - 0-13	Antrim	Fraher Field, Dungarvan; Referee: R Hickey
18/04/09; Round 8	L O'Lionain (0-3), B Wall (0-2), P Ogle (0-2), S O'Hare (0-1)		P Cunningham (0-6), C Close (0-2), D Edwards (0-2), J Crozier (0-1), M Pollock (0-1), T McCann (0-1)	Fraher Field, Dungarvan; Referee: R Hickey

18/04/09; Round 8	Kilkenny	1-9 - 2-22	Carlow	Nowlan Park, Kilkenny; Referee: B Tyrrell
18/04/09; Round 8	G Lawlor (0-6), J Brennan (1-0), R Shore (0-1), T Nolan (0-1)		D Hayden (1-3), E McCormack (1-3), J Kavanagh (0-5), S Rea (0-4), B Murphy (0-1), G Nolan (0-1), JJ Smith (0-1), M Carpenter (0-1), S Gannon (0-1), W Minchin (0-1)	Nowlan Park, Kilkenny; Referee: B Tyrrell

18/04/09; Round 8	Wicklow	0-10 - 0-11	Sligo	Aughrim County Ground, Aughrim; Referee: M Deegan
18/04/09; Round 8	D Odlum (0-4), L Glynn (0-3), N Gaffney (0-1), P Earls (0-1), S Carthy (0-1)		K Sweeney (0-3), S Coen (0-2), R Donovan (0-1), S Gilmartin (0-1)	Aughrim County Ground, Aughrim; Referee: M Deegan

=== Division 4 Final ===
25/04/09	Sligo	1-12 – 1-10	Antrim	Pearse Park, Longford; Referee: M McGann
25/04/09	S Coen (1-3), A Marren (0-5), A Costello (0-1), D Kelly (0-1), G Gaughan (0-1), S Davey (0-1)	Report	P Cunningham (0-5), C Close (1-0), J Loughry (0-2), T McCann (0-2), M McCann (0-1)	Pearse Park, Longford; Referee: M McGann

== Statistics ==
- All scores correct as of 29 March 2016

=== Scoring ===
- Widest winning margin: 34
  - Kilkenny 0-5 - 4-27 Antrim (Division 4)
- Most goals in a match: 6
  - Wexford 2-9 - 4-16 Armagh (Division 2)
- Most points in a match: 37
  - Laois 0-23 - 1-14 Fermanagh (Division 2)
- Most goals by one team in a match: 5
  - Dublin 5-22 - 0-10 Westmeath (Division 1)
  - Clare 5-21 - 0-4 Kilkenny (Division 4)
- Highest aggregate score: 47 points
  - Dublin 5-22 - 0-10 Westmeath (Division 1)
- Lowest aggregate score: 16 points
  - Waterford 1-7 - 0-6 Carlow (Division 4)

=== Top scorers ===
Overall

Rank	Player	County	Tally	Total	Matches	Average
1	Michael Meehan	Galway	4-39	51	7	7.3
2	Barry Grogan	Tipperary	1-44	47	7	6.7
3	David Tubridy	Clare	3-35	44	8	5.5
4	Colm Cooper	Kerry	3-34	43	7	6.1
5	Adrian Marren	Sligo	4-27	39	6	6.5
6	John Doyle	Kildare	0-37	37	7	5.3
6	Brian Wall	Waterford	1-34	37	7	5.3
8	David Glennon	Westmeath	1-30	33	7	4.7
8	Paddy Cunningham	Antrim	2-27	33	5	6.6
10	Paul Finlay	Monaghan	1-29	32	8	4
10	Ian Ryan	Limerick	2-26	32	7	4.6
12	Tommy Freeman	Monaghan	4-19	31	7	4.4
13	Eric McCormack	Carlow	2-23	29	6	4.8
13	Emlyn Mulligan	Leitrim	1-26	29	5	5.8

Single game

Rank	Player	County	Tally	Total	Opposition
1	Ryan Henderson	Armagh	4-3	15	Wexford
2	CJ McGourty	Antrim	3-5	14	Kilkenny
3	Michael Meehan	Galway	1-9	12	Donegal
4	David Tubridy	Clare	2-6	12	Kilkenny
5	Paddy Cunningham	Antrim	1-8	11	Clare
5	Brian Wall	Waterford	1-8	11	Kilkenny
7	John Doyle	Kildare	0-10	10	Wexford
7	Conal Keaney	Dublin	1-7	10	Westmeath
7	Seanie Furlong	Wicklow	1-7	10	Kilkenny
7	Adrian Marren	Sligo	2-4	10	Kilkenny
7	Dean Odlum	Wicklow	2-4	10	Kilkenny
7	Mark Dougan	Antrim	3-1	10	Carlow
