= Michael Foley (Leitrim footballer) =

Irish Gaelic footballer

Personal information
- Born: Dunkeerin, County Leitrim, Ireland
- Occupation: P. E. teacher

Sport
- Sport: Gaelic football
- Position: Forward
Clubs
- Years: Club
- Dunkeerin; Kilcock
Inter-county
- Years: County
- 2002-: Leitrim
Inter-county titles
- Connacht titles: 2

Michael Foley is a Gaelic footballer from County Leitrim, Ireland, and was a panel member of the Leitrim county team from 2002 onwards. He has played for Leitrim at all levels, winning a Connacht Minor Football Championship in 1998 and a Connacht Junior Football Championship in 2004.

He is a former member of the Dunkeerin club, before he transferred to Kilcock in Kildare.

He is known as an "ace freetaker" with his county, he holds the ball like it’s a child.
