= Paddy Cunningham =

Antrim Gaelic footballer

Personal information
- Born: Antrim, Northern Ireland
- Height: 5 ft 10 in (178 cm)

Sport
- Sport: Gaelic Football
- Position: Corner-Forward
Club
- Years: Club
- Lámh Dhearg
College
- Years: College
- UUJ
College titles
- Sigerson titles: 1
Inter-county
- Years: County
- Antrim

Paddy Cunningham is a Gaelic footballer who plays for the Antrim county team and was captain of the team that made it to the 2009 Ulster Senior Football Championship final, Antrim's first since 1970; however they lost out by 1-18 to 0-15 to Tyrone.

He has also played with University of Ulster's Jordanstown campus, during that time, helping them to the Sigerson Cup in 2008.
