= Seánie Furlong =

Irish Gaelic footballer

Personal information
- Born: 1987 (age 38–39) Wicklow, Ireland

Sport
- Sport: Gaelic Football and Hurling
- Position: Full Forward
Club
- Years: Club
- Kiltegan
Club titles
- Wicklow titles: 1
Inter-county
- Years: County
- 2008-2018: Wicklow
Inter-county titles
- NFL: 1

Seánie Furlong is a Gaelic footballer from County Wicklow, Ireland. He plays Gaelic football with his local club Kiltegan and has been a member of the Wicklow. Furlong made his senior championship debut against Kildare which turned out to be the County's first win in a Leinster championship at Croke Park. In 2012 he won Man of the Match as Wicklow overcame Fermanagh to take the Div 4 National League title scoring 1-05 of his side's title.
