= 1978 All-Ireland Senior Camogie Championship =

Camogie championship

All-Ireland Senior Camogie Championship 1978
Winners
- Champions: Cork (11th title)
- Captain: Nancy O'Driscoll

Runners-up
- Runners-up: Dublin
- Captain: Sheila Murray

The 1978 All Ireland Camogie Championship was won by Cork, who beat Dublin by 17 points in the final. It was the last final to be played using the second crossbar.

== Championship ==
Margaret O'Toole scored the goal to bring Clare into the All-Ireland semi-final for the second successive year and third time in all.

== Semi-final ==
Dublin’s superior ground play and first half goals from Anna Byrne and Mary Mernagh proved decisive in a semi-final victory over Wexford played in torrential rain.

== Final ==
Cork scored three goals (from Shiela Murray, Nancy O'Driscoll and Pat Moloney) and two points without reply in the opening twenty minutes, ending the game as a contest. Cork added two goals late in the second half when Dublin showed signs of recovering. Sean Kilfeather wrote in the Irish Times:

Dublin were left with a completely hopeless task after only 20 minutes, by which time Cork had scored three goals and two points, without reply. By half-time Cork had added another goal and Dublin were still scoreless. The second half saw Dublin put up a plucky fright and we were left wondering why they were so ineffective earlier. Had Dublin adopted different tactics from the start, they would scarcely have been outscored to the extent of 17 points.

Agnes Hourigan, who was then president of the Camogie Association, wrote in the Irish Press:

In many years watching Cork camogie teams I do not think I have seen one play better than yesterday. Cork, for whom nothing could go wrong yesterday, were obviously far the superior side from the start, the game was always entertaining, even though it lacked a real competitive element. All through it was a delight t watch the speed style, and skill of such long serving Corkonians as Pat Moloney and full back Marie Costine.

Mary Geaney was an Ireland women's field hockey international and officials of the Irish Ladies Hockey Union attended the match as guests. Nancy O'Driscoll became the first player to captain Cork at two different grades.

July 16
Quarter-Final

Wexford	2-9 – 3-2	Kilkenny

Gowran

July 16
Quarter-Final

Dublin	2-4 – 0-2	Antrim

Corrigan Park

July 23
Quarter-Final

Clare	1-1 – 0-3	Tipperary

Rosslevin Park Ennis

July 23
Quarter-Final

Cork	3-13 – 0-3	Galway

Páirc Uí Chaoimh

=== Final stages ===
August 20
Semi-Final

Cork	5-15 – 3-1	Clare

Páirc Uí Chaoimh

August 13
Semi-Final

Dublin	2-4 – 2-3	Wexford

Russell Park

=== Final ===
1978-9-17
Final
15:00 BST

Cork	6-4 – 1-2	Dublin
M Geary 3-0, P Maloney 2-0, M O'Leary 1-3, N O'Driscoll 0-1		N Fleming 1-1, H Roche (0-1),

Croke Park, Dublin
Referee: Helena O'Neill (Kilkenny)

Cork	Dublin

CORK:
GK	1	Marian McCarthy (South Pres)
FB	2	Marie Costine (Cloyne)
RWB	3	Marie Ryan
CB	4	Cathy Landers (Killeagh)
LWB	5	Patrica O'Riordan (Ballinlough)
MF	6	Claire Cronin (Balinlough)
MF	7	Angela Higgin Watergrasshill
MF	8	Nancy O'Driscoll Éire Óg) (captain) 0-1
RWF	9	Mary O'Leary (Watergrasshill) 1-3
CF	10	Marion Sweeny (Killeagh)
LWF	11	Pat Moloney (Killeagh) 2-0
FF	12	Mary Geaney (Éire Óg) 3-0

DUBLIN:
GK	1	Shiela Murray (Austin Stacks)
FB	2	Shiela Wallace (Cuala-Naomh Mhuire)
RWB	3	Anna Redmond (Cuala Naomh Mhuire}
CB	4	Brenie Conroy (Cuala-Naomh Mhuire) (substituted off) 32'
LWB	5	Catherine Docherty (Celtic)
MF	6	Annie MacManus (Austin Stacks)
MF	7	Marion Conway (Austin Stacks) (substituted off) 20'
MF	8	Barbra Redmond (Cuala Naomh Mhuire}
RWF	9	Evelyn Sweeny (Celtic) (substituted off) 20'
CF	10	Mary Mernagh (Eoghan Rua)
LWF	11	Noren Fleming (Celtic) 1-1
FF	12	Anna Byrne (Austin Stacks)
Substitutes:
LWF		Helen Roche (Club unknown) for Sweeny 0-1 (substituted on) 20'
RWF		Felicity Sutton (Club unknown) for Marie Murphy (substituted on) 20'
LWB		Mary Murphy (Club unknown) for Brenie Conroy (substituted on) 32'

MATCH RULES

- 50 minutes
- Replay if scores level
- Maximum of 3 substitutions

== See also ==
- All-Ireland Senior Hurling Championship
- Wikipedia List of Camogie players
- National Camogie League
- Camogie All Stars Awards
- Ashbourne Cup

Preceded by All-Ireland Senior Camogie Championship 1977	All-Ireland Senior Camogie Championship; 1932 – present	Succeeded by All-Ireland Senior Camogie Championship 1979
