= 1982 All-Ireland Senior Camogie Championship =

Camogie championship

All-Ireland Senior Camogie Championship 1982
Championship details
- Dates: June – 26 September 1982

All-Ireland champions
- Winners: Cork (13th win)
- Captain: Pat Lenihan

All-Ireland runners-up
- Runners-up: Dublin
- Captain: Brenie Toner

Championship statistics
- Matches played: 7

The 1982 All Ireland Camogie Championship was won by Cork, beating Dublin by a single point in the final.

== Early rounds ==
Edel Murphy scored 1-6 and Marian Conroy another goal as Dublin withstood a late Limerick comeback to win the semi-final by three points. Three first half goals by Val Fitzpatrick helped Cork draw with Kilkenny, for whom Angela Downey scored 1-10 and Bridie McGarry equalised from a sideline ball 25 yards from the left corner flag three minutes from the end, the third draw in the championship between the teams since 1974. Cathy Landers had to score a point from midfield to give Cork victory, just as Helena O'Neill had been faced with a similar free to equalise in 1974. Helena succeeded, Cathy did not. The replay was attended by a large crowd (it was claimed that all three semi-finals had record attendances for this stage but records are incomplete) and finished Cork 5-4 to 3-10 before 20 minutes of extra time was required to separate the sides. Cork scored 2-4 to Kilkenny's 0-2 in extra time. Their goals came from Mary Geaney and Pat Lenihan (two each), Mary O'Leary who scored 1-8, Marian McCarthy and Marion Sweeney.

== Final ==
A dramatic point from a 50-yard free in the last minute byMary O'Leary leaving Dublin lamenting their third defeat in a final in six years. It followed the decisive goal with five minutes to go when Mary O'Leary collected the ball 50 yards from goal and sent in a hard driven shot which dipped below the crossbar. O'Leary scored 1-6 in a fast paced game. Marian McCarthy scored a Dublin goal from the edge of the square after 54 seconds, Cork attacked from the restart and when Yvonne Redmond was slow to clear Pat Lenihanscored a Cork goal after just 90 seconds to complete the quickest two goals in All Ireland camogie history, Una Crowley then had Dublin's second goal after seven minutes and Dublin led 2-5 to 1-3 at half time.

=== Final stages ===
July 4
Quarter-Final

Limerick	3-2 – 1-6	Antrim

Adare

July 11
Quarter-Final

Cork	4-12 – 0-4	Antrim

Adare

July 25
Quarter-Final

Dublin	2-7 – 2-0	Wexford

Pairc Carmain

Aug 22
Semi-Final

Dublin	2-9 – 2-6	Limerick

Na Fianna

Aug 29
Semi-Final

Cork	3-8 – 1-14	Kilkenny

Nowlan Park

Sept 12
Semi-Final Replay

Cork	7-8 – 3-13 after extra time	Kilkenny

Ballinlough

1982-9-26
Final
15:00 BST

Cork	2-7 – 2-6	Dublin
Mary O'Leary 1-6, Pat Lenihan 1-1		Una Crowley 1-1, Marian Conroy 1-0, Edel Murphy 0-2, Orlaith Ryan 0-2, Anna Conlon 0-1

Croke Park, Dublin
Attendance: 3,000
Referee: Belle O'Loughlin (Down)

Cork	Dublin

CORK:
GK	1	Marian McCarthy (Éire Óg)
FB	2	Ellen Dineen (Éire Óg)
RWB	3	Miriam Higgins (Éire Óg)
CB	4	Cathy Landers (Killeagh)
LWB	5	Martha Kearney (Na Piarsaigh)
MF	6	Clare Cronin (Old Als
MF	7	Val Fitzpatrick (Glen Rovers)
MF	8	Ger McCarthy (Glen Rovers) (substituted off) 35'
RWF	9	Mary O'Leary (Watergrasshill) (1-6)
CF	10	Pat Lenihan (Killeagh) (Capt) (1-1) (substituted off) 16' (substituted on) 35'
LWF	11	Marion Sweeney (Killeagh)
FF	12	Noelle O'Driscoll
Substitutes:
MF		Sandie Fitzgibbon (Glen Rovers) for Lenihan (substituted on) 16'
MF		Pat Lenihan for McCarthy (substituted on) 35'

DUBLIN:
GK	1	Yvonne Redmond (Cúchulainn Crumlin)
FB	2	Anna O'Brien (Cúchulainn Crumlin)
RWB	3	Frances Murphy (UCD)
CB	4	Brenie Toner (Cuala Naomh Mhuire)
LWB	5	Catherine Docherty (Celtic)
MF	6	Una Crowley (Celtic) (1-1) (substituted off) 45'
MF	7	Mary Mernagh (Cuala Naomh Mhuire) (substituted off) 35'
MF	8	Edel Murphy (UCD) (0-2)
RWF	9	Ann Conlon (Austin Stacks) (0-1)
CF	10	Marian Conroy (Austin Stacks) (1-0)
LWF	11	Barbara Redmond (Cúchulainn Crumlin)
FF	12	Orlaith Ryan (Austin Stacks) (0-2)
Substitutes:
MF		Joanne Gormley (UCD) for Mernagh (substituted on) 35'
MF		M Murphy (Cúchulainn Crumlin) for Crowley (substituted on) 45'

MATCH RULES

- 50 minutes
- Replay if scores level
- Maximum of 3 substitutions

== See also ==
- All-Ireland Senior Hurling Championship
- Wikipedia List of Camogie players
- National Camogie League
- Camogie All Stars Awards
- Ashbourne Cup

Preceded by All-Ireland Senior Camogie Championship 1979	All-Ireland Senior Camogie Championship; 1932 – present	Succeeded by All-Ireland Senior Camogie Championship 1983
