= 1981 All-Ireland Senior Camogie Championship =

Camogie championship

All-Ireland Senior Camogie Championship 1981
Tournament details
- Date: Oct 4

Winners
- Champions: Kilkenny (4th title)
- Captain: Liz Neary

Runners-up
- Runners-up: Cork
- Captain: Claire Cronin

Other
- Matches played: 2

The 1981 All-Ireland Senior Camogie Championship was the high point of the 1981 season. The championship was won by Killkenny who defeated Cork by a five-point margin in a replayed final. The match drew an attendance of 3,000.

== Quarter-finals ==
Surprise of the quarter-final stage was Down's 2–6 to 1–8 victory over Wexford, Marion McGarvey scoring 1-6 of their total. Before their quarter-final with Dublin, Cork dropped three Killeavy players, Pat Moloney, Marian Sweeney and Cathy Landers for playing in a challenge match on the eve of the League final. Dublin led by 4–2 to 1–5 at half time but Cork came storming back to equalise 11 minutes into the second half and win by five points, as Dublin sent over a total of eight wide in the second half and scored just one point. Angela Downey scored 3-4 for Kilkenny against Tipperary, for whom Deidre Lane scored 1–5.

== Semi-finals ==
Remarkably Galway led Cork by 1–5 to 1–3 at half time in the All Ireland semi-final before being swept aside by 2–4 in the first ten minutes of the second half. Down appearing in their first semi-final since 1949, never got to grips with Kilkenny and trailed by 2–3 to 0-2 after 13 minutes of their semi-final in Nowlan Park.

== Final ==
Kilkenny got a reprieve in the see-saw final when Cork had led by nine points five minutes into the second half but when Liz Neary snatched a goal from a rebound 25 minutes into the second half they trailed by just a point. In what was described by the Irish Independent as a truly memorable four-minute period of extra time. Kilkenny fought hard for the equaliser and it was Margaret Farrell who saved the day with a point from play. The five point margin in the replay flattered Kilkenny after Angela Downey scored a breakaway goal in the last movement of the match. Mary O'Leary’s attempt to score an equalising goal from a free a few minutes earlier had been deflected over the bar. Agnes Hourigan, president of the Camogie Association, wrote in the Irish Press:

Kilkenny battled back from a seemingly hopeless half time position to earn a draw. The champions seemed to haf the issue clinched in the 54th minute when Mary Geaney set up Mary O’Leary, but from point blank range she missed the proverbial sitter by driving wide. Profiting from that escape, Kilkenny mounted one last assault and Margaret Farrell sent high between the posts for the equalizer. Time was called on the puckout and an exciting, skilful game was over.

== Replay ==
Agnes Hourigan, president of the Camogie Association, wrote in the Irish Press:

Medals for bravery should have been awarded to the girls of Kilkenny and Cork as they tirelessly battled for dominance in the replay under the sullen clouds of Croke Park yesterday. In the most atrocious ground conditions, Kilkenny packaged their fourth title and their heroine, Angela Downey, immortalized her name by taking all but three of her side’s scores.

=== Final stages ===
June 14
First Round

Cork	3-8 – 0-4	Antrim

Randalstown

July 12
Quarter-Final

Cork	4-8 – 4-3	Dublin

St Finbarr's

July 26
Quarter-Final

Down	2-6 – 1-8	Wexford

Kilkeel

July 26
Quarter-Final

Kilkenny	5-8 – 1-6	Wexford

Moneygall

August 16
Semi-Final

Cork	5-10 – 1-7	Galway

St Finbarr's

August 16
Semi-Final

Kilkenny	4-13 – 1-3	Down

Nowlan Park

September 13
Final

Kilkenny	3-9 – 3-9	Cork

Croke Park, Dublin

October 4
Replay

Kilkenny	1-9 – 0-7	Cork

Croke Park, Dublin

=== Drawn Final September 13: Kilkenny 3-9 Cork 3-9 ===
Kilkenny	Cork

KILKENNY:
GK	1	Teresa O'Neill (St Paul's)
FB	2	Liz Neary (St Paul's) (Capt) (2-0)
RWB	3	Ann Downey (St Paul's)
CB	4	Bridie McGarry (St Paul's) (0-1)
LWB	5	Biddy O'Sullivan (Tullogher)
MF	6	Anne Holden (Ballyhale Shamrocks)
MF	7	Peggy Muldowney (Gowran)
MF	8	Margaret Farrell (UCD) (0-1)
RWF	9	Helena McCormack (St Paul's) (0-1)
CF	10	Angela Downey (St Paul's) (1-6)
LWF	11	Ann Whelan (Castlecomer) (substituted off) 55'
FF	12	Jo Dunne (Carrickshock)
Substitutes:
MF		Geraldine Sutton (0-1) for Holden (substituted in) Half time'
RWF		Anne Marie Brennan for Anna Whelan (substituted in) 55'

CORK:
GK	1	Marian McCarthy (South Pres)
FB	2	Ellen Dineen (Éire Óg)
RWB	3	Patricia Riordan] (Ballinlough)
CB	4	Martha Kearney (Na Piarsaigh)
LWB	5	Miriam Higgins (Éire Óg)
MF	6	Liz Lynch (Douglas)
MF	7	Nancy O'Driscoll (Éire Óg)
MF	8	Angela Higgins (Watergrasshill)
RWF	9	Clare Cronin (Old Als) (Capt) (1-1)
CF	10	Mary O'Leary (Watergrasshill) (0-7)
LWF	11	Geraldine McCarthy (Nemo Rangers) (0-1)
FF	12	Mary Geaney (Éire Óg) (2-0)

MATCH RULES

- 50 minutes
- Replay if scores level
- Maximum of 3 substitutions

=== Replay October 4: Kilkenny 1-9 Cork 0-7 ===
Kilkenny	Cork

KILKENNY:
GK	1	Teresa O'Neill (St Paul's)
FB	2	Liz Neary (St Paul's) (Capt)
RWB	3	Ann Downey (St Paul's)
CB	4	Bridie McGarry (St Paul's)
LWB	5	Biddy O'Sullivan (Tullogher)
MF	6	Geraldine Sutton (0-1)
MF	7	Peggy Muldowney (Gowran) (substituted in) 55'
MF	8	Margaret Farrell (UCD) (0-1)
RWF	9	Helena McCormack (St Paul's) (0-1)
CF	10	Angela Downey (St Paul's) (1-6)
LWF	11	Ann Whelan (Castlecomer)
FF	12	Jo Dunne (Carrickshock)
Substitutes:
MF		Anne Marie Brennan for Peggy Muldowney (substituted in) 55'

CORK:
GK	1	Marian McCarthy (South Pres)
FB	2	Ellen Dineen (Éire Óg)
RWB	3	Patricia Riordan (Ballinlough)
CB	4	Martha Kearney (Na Piarsaigh)
LWB	5	Miriam Higgins (Éire Óg) (substituted off) 55'
MF	6	Liz Lynch (Douglas) (substituted off) 35'
MF	7	Nancy O'Driscoll (Éire Óg)
MF	8	Angela Higgins (Watergrasshill)
RWF	9	Clare Cronin (Old Als) (Capt) (substituted off) 35'
CF	10	Mary O'Leary (Watergrasshill) (0-7) (3 frees, 3 35's)
LWF	11	Geraldine McCarthy (Nemo Rangers)
FF	12	Mary Geaney (Éire Óg)
Substitutes:
MF		Jenny O'Sullivan for Liz Lynch (substituted in) 35'
MF		Claire Kelleher for Clare Cronin (substituted in) 35'
MF		Val Fitzpatrick for Higgins (substituted in) 55'

MATCH RULES

- 50 minutes
- Replay if scores level
- Maximum of 3 substitutions

== See also ==
- All-Ireland Senior Hurling Championship
- Wikipedia List of Camogie players
- National Camogie League
- Camogie All Stars Awards
- Ashbourne Cup

Preceded by All-Ireland Senior Camogie Championship 1980	All-Ireland Senior Camogie Championship; 1932 – present	Succeeded by All-Ireland Senior Camogie Championship 1982
