= 1971 All-Ireland Senior Camogie Championship =

Camogie championship

All-Ireland Senior Camogie Championship 1971
Winners
- Champions: Cork (8th title)
- Manager: Mary Moran
- Captain: Betty Sugrue

Runners-up
- Runners-up: Wexford
- Captain: Brenie O'Dwyer

Other
- Matches played: 7

The 1971 All-Ireland Senior Camogie Championship was the high point of the 1971 season. The championship was won by Cork, who defeated Wexford by a 13-point margin in the final. The match drew an attendance of 4,000.

== Semi-finals ==
Kilkenny won the Leinster Championship for the first time when they defeated Dublin 5–3 to 4–3 and received an unexpected bye to the All-Ireland final when Galway withdrew, receiving a three-month suspension from Central Council for failing to fulfil the fixture.

== Final ==
Cork took control of the final in the first half. Agnes Hourigan, president of the Camogie Association, wrote in the Irish Press

The game was won and lost in the five minutes preceding the interval with Wexford leading 1-1 to 0-2 in the 20th minute when, Rosie Hennessy and Anne Comerford, last year’s captain, cracked home three Cork goals.

=== Final stages ===
August
Semi-Final

Wexford	6-3 – 3-3	Antrim

Croke Park

August
Semi-Final

Cork	3-14 – 0-3	Galway

Sept 19
Final

Cork	4-6 – 1-2	Wexford

Croke Park, Dublin

Cork	Wexford

CORK:
GK	1	Mel Cummins
FB	2	Marie Costine (Cloyne)
RWB	3	Hannah Cotter (South Pres)
CB	4	Anna McAuliffe (Old Als)
LWB	5	Mary Whelton (South Pres)
MF	6	Marian McCarthy (South Pres)
MF	7	Betty Sugrue (South Pres) (Capt)
MF	8	Pat Moloney (UCC)
RWF	9	Anne Comerford (Watergrasshill) (Capt)
CF	10	Liz Garvan (UCC) (0–3)
LWF	11	Nuala Gilly (Cloyne)
FF	12	Rose Hennessy UCC) (2-2)

(WEXFORD):
GK	1	Teresa Sheil
FB	2	Joan Murphy
RWB	3	Peggie Doyle
CB	4	Bernie O’Dwyer
LWB	5	Bridie Jacob
MF	6	Annie Kehoe
MF	7	Margaret O’Leary
MF	8	Elsie Walsh
RWF	9	Mary Shannon
CF	10	Mary Walsh (1–0)
LWF	11	Mary Sheil
FF	12	Josie Kehoe (0–1)
Substitutes:
CB		Maggie Hearne (0–1) (substituted on) 55'

MATCH RULES

- 50 minutes
- Replay if scores level
- Maximum of 3 substitutions

== See also ==
- All-Ireland Senior Hurling Championship
- Wikipedia List of Camogie players
- National Camogie League
- Camogie All Stars Awards
- Ashbourne Cup

Preceded by All-Ireland Senior Camogie Championship 1970	All-Ireland Senior Camogie Championship; 1932 – present	Succeeded by All-Ireland Senior Camogie Championship 1972
