= 1981 National Camogie League =

Camogie tournament

National Camogie League 1981
Winners
- Champions: Dublin (2nd title)
- Captain: Sile Wallace

Runners-up
- Runners-up: Cork

The 1981 National Camogie League is a competition in the women's team field sport of camogie was won by Dublin, who defeated Cork in the final, played at Russell Park.

== Arrangements ==
Counties played each other twice for the first time in the history of the Camogie League. Cork beat Kilkenny and Wexford at home and away while Dublin defeated Antrim and Down and got a walkover from Derry who found it difficult to travel for their fixture. Limerick won their group from Clare, Galway and Tipperary and were beaten in the semi-final by Dublin.

== Final ==
Marian Conway’s accuracy from frees secured the title for Dublin. The first goal of the game came in the 37th minute from a fine movement involving Joanne Gormley, Marian Conway and Orlaith Ni Riain who sent the ball to the net. Cork replied in the 45th minute with a goal by Pat Moloney, leaving three points between the sides but despite a concerted effort by the Cork forwards during the last quarter their scoring efforts were repulsed by Yvonne Redmond in the Dublin goal. Cork were without their star forward Mary O'Leary.

Agnes Hourigan, president of the Camogie Association, wrote in The Irish Press:

It was Dublin’s ability to pick off points that ensured victory. Strength at midfield and consistency in defence were the features of the Dublin team.

== Division 2 ==
The Junior National League, known since 2006 as Division Two, was won by Cavan who defeated Louth by four points to two in the lowest scoring final in the history of the division, In the replay on July 5 at Castlebellingham, Ellen Clark saved the day for Cavan when she pointed from play to force a 2–4 to 1–7 draw at Cootheill on May 30. Cavan had led 2–2 to 0–3 at half time thanks to goals from Bernie O'Callaghan and Anna O'Sullivan. Noele Brady scored all of Louth’s total of 1–7. Cavan led 0-4 to nil at half-time in the replay. Bernie O'Callaghan scored all of Cavan’s points, while Noele Brady scored two Louth points in reply in the second half. Vivienne Kelly in the Louth goal was player of the match for both draw and replay. Louth were reigning Leinster junior champions and had beaten Kildare in the Division 2 semi-final. Kildare were 1980 Division 2 finalists and were to become 1981 Leinster junior champions.

=== Final stages ===
June 2
Semi-final

Dublin	3-10 – 2-2	Limerick

June 21
Final

Dublin	1-7 – 1-4	Cork
Orla Ryan 1-0; Marian Conroy 0-7		Pat Molony 1-0; Geraldine McCarthy 0-2, Val Fitzpatrick 0-2 0-2.

Russell Park
Attendance: 2,000
Referee: Belle O'Loughlin (Down)

Dublin	Cork

Dublin:
GK	1	Yvonne Redmond (Cúchulainn Crumlin)
FB	2	Anne O'Brien (Cúchulainn Crumlin)
RWB	3	Frances Murphy (UCD)
CB	4	Sheila Wallace (Cuala-Naomh Mhuire)
LWB	5	Catherine Docherty (Celtic)
MF	6	Una Crowley (Celtic)
MF	7	Edel Murphy (UCD)
MF	8	Mary Duane
RWF	9	Orlaith Ni Riain (Austin Stacks)
CF	10	Mary Mernagh (Cuala Naomh Mhuire)
LWF	11	Marian Conway (Austin Stacks)
FF	12	Joanne Gormley

Cork:
GK	1	Marian McCarthy (South Pres)
FB	2	Patricia Riordan (Ballinlough)
RWB	3	Miriam Higgins (Éire Óg)
CB	4	Cathy Landers (Killeagh)
LWB	5	Martha Kearney (Na Piarsaigh)
MF	6	Claire Cronin (Old Als)
MF	7	Angela Higgins Higgins (Watergrasshill)
MF	8	Geraldine McCarthy
RWF	9	Pat Molony (Killeagh)
CF	10	Val Fitzpatrick (Glen Rovers)
LWF	11	Marian Sweeney (Killeagh)
FF	12	Mary Geaney (Killeagh)

|}

Preceded by National Camogie League 1980	National Camogie League; 1977 – present	Succeeded by National Camogie League 1982
