= 1982 National Camogie League =

Camogie tournament

National Camogie League 1982
Winners
- Champions: Kilkenny (3rd title)
- Captain: Teresa O'Neill

Runners-up
- Runners-up: Cork

The 1982 National Camogie League is a competition in the women's team field sport of camogie was won by Kilkenny, who defeated Cork in the final, played at St John’s Park, Kilkenny.

== Arrangements ==
Cork defeated Limerick, Clare, Tipperary and Wexford, while Kilkenny defeated Dublin the holders, Antrim, Down and Galway.

== The Final ==
Jo Dunne secured the title for Kilkenny with two goals. Cork showed five changes from their All-Ireland team and Kilkenny had three. Cork played with the wind in the first half but did not open the scoring until the 16th minute when a long distance free from Martha Kearney eluded the defence to put Cork ahead with a goal. They added two points before the interval, while Kilkenny’s only score was an Angela Downey point from a free. Pat Landers and Val Fitzpatrick were best for Cork in the first half. Only Liz Neary impressed on the Kilkenny side. Aided by the wind Kilkenny into attack in the opening minutes of the second half with Jo Dunne and Angela Downey adding points. A good Kilkenny movements five minutes later saw Anna Whelan cross to Angela Downey, who passed on to Jo Dunne and she finished to the net, putting Kilkenny ahead by one point. Mary O'Leary and Angela Downey then exchanged points. Jo Dunne’s second goal, palmed to the net in the 16th minute, gave Kilkenny a three point lead. They increased this a minute later and despite Cork’s efforts Kilkenny claimed the titile.

== Division 2 ==
The Junior National League, known since 2006 as Division Two, was reorganised to allow the second teams of the senior counties. The second teams were kept apart from the junior counties, who were divided into three zones. The division was won by Dublin who defeated Tyrone in a one-sided final at Eglish on May 30, their side led by Anna Thorpe, Mairéad Bergin, Catherine Ledwidge, goalkeeper Toni Byrne, Mary Daune, Ethna O'Hehir and Anne Colgan, while Tyrone’s stars were Pauline Vally, Ann Daly, Ann Jordan, Caroline McCann, Kathleen Devlin, Ursula Jordan and Nuala Kelly. Dublin defeated Galway, Antrim, Down and Kilkenny, Tipperary in the play-off, and Kildare in the semi-final. Tyrone defeated Westmeath, Roscommon, Donegal, Derry, drew with holders Cavan, and defeated Carlow in the semi-final. Agnes Hourigan, president of the Camogie Association, wrote in the Irish Press:

. In fact this competition may have to be examined in the light of varying standards in the counties, considering it was inaugurated to help the weaker counties. Even within the junior zones, there was a wide range of standards. Dublin were not extended in any of their games in their section or in the play off game with Tipperary. They had no difficulty in defeating Kildare in the semi-final, a factor which must worry the Lily Whites as they are 1991 Leinster junior champions in the final last Sunday they proved much too strong, too experienced and too clever for Tyrone, whom they defeated 6-9 to 0-2.

=== Final stages ===
May 24
Final

| Kilkenny | 2-5 – 1-4 | Cork |

St John’s Park, Kilkenny

| Kilkenny | Cork |

Kilkenny:
| GK | 1 | Teresa O'Neill (St Paul’s) |
| FB | 2 | Ann Downey (St Paul’s) |
| RWB | 3 | Anne Marie Brennan |
| CB | 4 | Bridie McGarry (St Paul’s) |
| LWB | 5 | Anna Holden (Ballyhale Shamrocks) |
| MF | 6 | Biddy O'Sullivan (Shamrocks) |
| MF | 7 | Deidre Maloney (St Brigid’s Ballycallan) |
| MF | 8 | Liz Neary (St Paul’s) (capt.) |
| RWF | 9 | Anne Whelan (Lisdowney) |
| CF | 10 | Geraldine Sutton |
| LWF | 11 | Angela Downey (St Paul’s) 0-4 |
| FF | 12 | Jo Dunne (Carrickshock) 2-1 |

Cork:
| GK | 1 | Marian McCarthy |
| FB | 2 | Martha Kearney 1-0 |
| RWB | 3 | Miriam Higgins |
| CB | 4 | Cathy Landers |
| LWB | 5 | Anna Delaney |
| MF | 6 | Claire Cronin |
| MF | 7 | Angela Higgins |
| MF | 8 | Geraldine McCarthy |
| RWF | 9 | Noelle O'Driscoll |
| CF | 10 | Val Fitzpatrick 0-1 |
| LWF | 11 | Pat Lenihan 0-1 |
| FF | 12 | Mary Geaney 0-1 |
Substitutes:
| RCF | | Marion Sweeney for Pat Lenehan |
| RCF | | Mary O'Leary 0-1 for Noelle O'Driscoll |

| Preceded by National Camogie League 1981 | National Camogie League; 1977 – present | Succeeded by National Camogie League 1983 |
