= 1972 All-Ireland Senior Camogie Championship =

Camogie championship

All-Ireland Senior Camogie Championship 1972
Winners
- Champions: Cork (11th title)
- Captain: Hanna Dineen

Runners-up
- Runners-up: Kilkenny
- Captain: Helena O'Neill

The 1972 All Ireland Camogie Championship was won by Cork who defeated Killkenny by a four margin in the final for their third successive success of a four-in-a-row. It was the first final in which the new look camogie uniform of the 1970s was used. The match drew an attendance of 4,000. It marked the first appearance in a final of a then 15-year-old Angela Downey.

== Semi-finals ==
It was the second last year before the introduction of the open draw in camogie, Galway were graded junior. Kilkenny, who defeated Wexford 6–4 to 5–6 in the Leinster final with three goals from Maura Cassin and two from Angela Downey, had no opposition in the semi-final. Cork defeated Antrim in the second semi-final with a strong second half performance.

== Final ==
It was a tense final with both free takes Liz Garvan and Ann Carroll missing from positions from which they would normally have scored. Angela Downey scored the first of the game’s three goals for Kilkenny, Liz Garvan scored Cork’s first goal from a free and Ann Carroll scored Cork’s second and deciding goal from a sideline ball. Shortly after the final, Liz Garvan travelled to Zambia to take up a teaching job and was lost to the game. Agnes Hourigan, president of the Camogie Association, wrote in the Irish Press:

The pity of yesterday’s game was that it never got off the ground. Both teams seemed to be too tense from the start and though Cork did manage to relax somewhat when they got ahead in the closing stages, one felt, considering the obvious talent of both teams, that the fare provided was only an insipid shadow of what it might have been, The marking was very close throughout, and while it had its moment’s the final never gave us the fast spectacular open play that we had seen earlier in the junior decider. Kilkenny, one felt, did a great deal to beat themselves. They never settled down and even in the second half it was not unusual to see three or four of their players in one another’s way.

=== Final stages ===
August 27
Semi-Final

Cork	5-5 – 3-1	Antrim

Croke Park

1972-9-17
Final
15:00 BST

Cork	2-5 – 1-4	Kilkenny
Liz Garvan 1-2, Anne Comerford 1-1) Marion Sweeney 0-2		Angela Downey 1-0, Ann Carroll 0-3, Liz Neary 0-1

Croke Park, Dublin
Referee: Lily Spence (Antrim)

Cork

CORK:
GK	1	Deirdre Sutton (Glen Rovers)
FB	2	Marie Costine (Cloyne)
RWB	3	Hanna Dineen (South Pres) (captain)
CB	4	Anna McAuliffe (Old Als)
LWB	5	Mary Whelton (South Pres)
MF	6	Marian McCarthy (South Pres)
MF	7	Betty Sugrue (South Pres
MF	8	Pat Moloney (UCC)
RWF	9	Anne Phelan (Watergrasshill) 1-1
CF	10	Liz Garvan (UCC)
LWF	11	Marion Sweeney (Youghal GAAYoughal)
FF	12	Rose Hennessy (UCC)

(KILKENNY):
GK	1	Teresa O'Neill (St Paul’s)
FB	2	Phil O'Shea (St Paul’s)
RWB	3	Mary O'Neill (St Paul’s)
CB	4	Carmel O'Shea (St Paul’s)
LWB	5	Annie Phelan (Sliabh Bloom)
MF	6	Brenda Cassin (Carrickshock)
MF	7	Ann Carroll (UCD) 0–3
MF	8	Liz Neary (St Paul’s) 0–1
RWF	9	Bridie Martin (Thornback)
CF	10	Maura Cassin (Carrickshock)
LWF	11	Helena O'Neill (St Paul’s)
FF	12	Angela Downey (St Paul’s)

MATCH RULES

- 50 minutes
- Replay if scores level
- Maximum of 3 substitutions

== See also ==
- All-Ireland Senior Hurling Championship
- Wikipedia List of Camogie players
- National Camogie League
- Camogie All Stars Awards
- Ashbourne Cup

Preceded by All-Ireland Senior Camogie Championship 1971	All-Ireland Senior Camogie Championship; 1932 – present	Succeeded by All-Ireland Senior Camogie Championship 1973
