= 1970 All-Ireland Senior Camogie Championship =

Camogie championship

All-Ireland Senior Camogie Championship 1970
Tournament details
- Date: Sept 20

Winners
- Champions: Cork (7th title)
- Manager: Mary Moran
- Captain: Ann Comerford

Runners-up
- Runners-up: Kilkenny
- Captain: Helena O'Neill

Other
- Matches played: 3

The 1970 All-Ireland Senior Camogie Championship was the high point of the 1970 season. The championship was won by Cork, who defeated Killkenny by an 11-point margin in the final. The match drew an attendance of 4,000.

== Semi-finals ==
Kilkenny won the Leinster Championship for the first time when they defeated Dublin 5–3 to 4–3 and received an unexpected bye to the All-Ireland final when Galway withdrew, receiving a three-month suspension from Central Council for failing to fulfil the fixture. Cork owe their victory over Antrim to a tremendous opening quarter when they raced into an eleven-point lead with two goals from Pat Moloney and a third from Rose Hennessy.

== Final ==
Liz Garvan, the 17-year-old tennis champion from Old Als, stole the show in the All-Ireland final with 3-6 of Cork’s total. Agnes Hourigan, president of the Camogie Association, wrote in the Irish Press

This was a match from which Cork emerged the most clear-cut of winners. They had an early shock when Anne Carroll cracked home Maura Cassin’s pass in the fourth minute but the advantage was short lived. Cork were in full command. True, Kilkenny had plenty of chances through the last ten minutes but their forwards were over-anxious and fumbled them away.

=== Final stages ===
August 20
Semi-Final

Cork	3-5 – 3-2	Antrim

September 20
Final

Cork	5–7 – 3-2	Kilkenny

Croke Park, Dublin

Cork	Kilkenny

CORK:
GK	1	Mel Cummins
FB	2	Marie Costine (Cloyne)
RWB	3	Hanna Dineen (South Pres)
CB	4	Mary Joe Ryan (Youghal)
LWB	5	Sheila Dunne (Canovee)
MF	6	Betty Sugrue (South Pres)
MF	7	Anna McAuliffe (Old Als)
MF	8	Anne Comerford (Watergrasshill) (Capt)
RWF	9	Pat Moloney (UCC)
CF	10	Liz Garvan (UCC) (3-6)
LWF	11	Peggy Dorgan (2-1)
FF	12	Rose Hennessy UCC)
Substitutes:
CB		Anne Crotty (substituted in) 55'

(KILKENNY):
GK	1	Jo Golden (St Paul’s)
FB	2	Nuala Durcan (St Paul’s) (substituted off) 21' (substituted in) 50'
RWB	3	Anne Phelan (St Paul’s)
CB	4	Mary Kennedy (St Brigid’s Ballycallan) (substituted off) 50'
LWB	5	Joan Kelly (St Paul’s)
MF	6	Liz Neary (St Paul’s)
MF	7	Carmel O'Shea (St Paul’s)
MF	8	Peggy Carey (St Brigid’s Ballycallan) (1-1)
RWF	9	Helena O'Neill (St Paul’s)
CF	10	Ann Carroll (St Paul’s)l (2-1)
LWF	11	Brenda Cassin (St Paul’s)
FF	12	Maura Cassin (St Paul’s)
Substitutes:
CB		Mary Conway (St Paul’s) for Nuala Duncan (substituted in) 21'

MATCH RULES

- 50 minutes
- Replay if scores level
- Maximum of 3 substitutions

== See also ==
- All-Ireland Senior Hurling Championship
- Wikipedia List of Camogie players
- National Camogie League
- Camogie All Stars Awards
- Ashbourne Cup

Preceded by All-Ireland Senior Camogie Championship 1969	All-Ireland Senior Camogie Championship; 1932 – present	Succeeded by All-Ireland Senior Camogie Championship 1971
