= 1983 All-Ireland Senior Camogie Championship =

Camogie championship

All-Ireland Senior Camogie Championship 1983
Championship details
- Dates: June – 25 September 1983

All-Ireland champions
- Winners: Cork (14th win)
- Captain: Cathy Landers

All-Ireland runners-up
- Runners-up: Dublin
- Captain: Marian Conroy

The 1983 All-Ireland Senior Camogie Championship was won by Cork, beating Dublin by a two-point margin in the final.

== Arrangement ==
A record eleven counties participated in the championship, the highest number since the separation of senior and junior championships in 1968. Antrim withdrew from the championship and gave a walkover to Cork in their tie scheduled for June 19. Tipperary surprised fancied Galway in the quarter-final.

== Final ==
Claire Kelleher scored the clinching goal for Cork five minutes from the end, carrying the ball round the hitherto impenetrable Dublin defence without having the ball tapped off her stick. That score left two points between the sides and although Dublin used all their resources they could not break down the resolute Cork defence. Cork shot a surfeit of wides in the first half and did not get their first score until the 12th minute, when Dublin were three points up. Val Fitzpatrick then hit a cracking shot which Yvonne Redmond could not hold to make it 1–1 to 0-3 and Mary Geaney went on to give Cork the lead for the first time.

=== Final stages ===
June 12 10
First round

Tipperary	2-11 – 2-4	Galway

Moneygall

June 19
First round

Dublin	4-12 – 0-3	Down

Kilkeel

July 17
Quarter-Final

Wexford	4-19 – 1-1	Louth

Dundalk

July 17
Quarter-Final

Tipperary	3-9 – 1-4	Limerick

Cappawhite

July 24
Quarter-Final

Dublin	2-8 – 3-2	Kilkenny

Russell Park

July 24
Quarter-Final

Cork	1-11 – 1-4	Clare

Church Road, Blackrock

August 21
Semi-Final

Dublin	5-9 – 0-9	Tipperary

Cappawhite

September 28
Semi-Final

Cork	1-14 – 0-4	Wexford

Rathnure

1983-9-25
Final
15:00 BST

Cork	2-5 – 1-6	Dublin
Mary O'Leary 0-4, Val Fitzpatrick 1-0, Claire Kelleher 1-0, Mary Geaney 0-1		Edel Murphy 0-4. Mary Mernagh 1-0, Marian Conroy 0-2

Croke Park, Dublin
Attendance: 3,413
Referee: Kathleen Quinn (Galway)

Cork	Dublin

CORK:
GK	1	Marian McCarthy (Éire Óg)
FB	2	Ellen Dineen (Éire Óg)
RWB	3	Miriam Higgins (Éire Óg)
CB	4	Cathy Landers (Killeagh) (Capt)
LWB	5	Martha Kearney
MF	6	Clare Cronin (Old Als)
MF	7	Marion Sweeney (substituted off) 33'
MF	8	Sandie Fitzgibbon (Glen Rovers)
RWF	9	Mary O'Leary (Watergrasshill) (0-4)
CF	10	Val Fitzpatrick (Glen Rovers) (1-0)
LWF	11	Claire Kelleher (1-0)
FF	12	Mary Geaney (Éire Óg) (0-1)
Substitutes:
MF		Ger McCarthy (Glen Rovers) for Sweeney (substituted on) 33'

DUBLIN:
GK	1	Yvonne Redmond (Cúchulainn Crumlin)
FB	2	Anna O'Brien (Cúchulainn Crumlin)
RWB	3	Catherine Ledwidge (Phoenix)
CB	4	Brenie Toner (Cuala Naomh Mhuire)
LWB	5	Germaine Noonan (UCD)
MF	6	Una Crowley (Celtic) (Capt) (substituted on) 35'
MF	7	Edel Murphy (UCD) (0-4)
MF	8	Barbara Redmond (Cúchulainn Crumlin)
RWF	9	Anne Condon (Austin Stacks)
CF	10	Mary Mernagh (Cuala Naomh Mhuire) (1-0)
LWF	11	Marian Conroy (Austin Stacks) (Capt) (0-2)
FF	12	Joanne Gormley (UCD)
Substitutes:
LWF		Anna Thorpe (An Caisleán Walkinstown) for Crowley (substituted on) 35' (substituted off) 40'
RWF		Anna Colgan (Celtic) for Thorpe (substituted on) 40'

MATCH RULES

- 50 minutes
- Replay if scores level
- Maximum of 3 substitutions

== See also ==
- All-Ireland Senior Hurling Championship
- Wikipedia List of Camogie players
- National Camogie League
- Camogie All Stars Awards
- Ashbourne Cup

Preceded by All-Ireland Senior Camogie Championship 1982	All-Ireland Senior Camogie Championship; 1932 – present	Succeeded by All-Ireland Senior Camogie Championship 1984
