= 1973 All-Ireland Senior Camogie Championship =

Camogie championship

All-Ireland Senior Camogie Championship 1973
Tournament details
- Date: Sept 16

Winners
- Champions: Cork (10th title)
- Manager: Mary Moran
- Captain: Marie Costine

Runners-up
- Runners-up: Antrim
- Captain: Mairéad McAtamney

Other
- Matches played: 7

The 1973 All-Ireland Senior Camogie Championship was the high point of the 1973 season. The championship was won by Cork who defeated Antrim by a single point margin in the final for their fourth successive success. The match drew an attendance of 4,000.

== Semi-finals ==
Antrim seemed to have taken a firm grip of the semi-final when Chris Boyle, who had just come on as substitute, got a goal to put them seven points clear near the interval. This setback roused Wexford who retaliated with a well taken goal by Mary Sheil but still trailed by 1–5 to 1–1 at half time. Marking as far closer in the second half.

== Final ==
After a match marred by heavy rain, Antrim failed in a dramatic bid for an equaliser at the end of the final. Agnes Hourigan, president of the Camogie Association, wrote in the Irish Press:

Over the 50 minutes Antrim had slightly the better of the play territorially and missed many second half scoring chance, were desperately unlucky not to snatch a draw in the dying seconds. Cork seemed to have the tenth title wrapped up when Ann Phelan goalled just three minutes from time and Marion McCarthy promptly pointed a 30 with just over two minute remaining to put the holders four points clear after Antrim had leveled the scores in a great rally. Then the Ulster champions came again. Mairéad McAtamney shot low from a free. The ball was diverted out for a 30, which the Antrim captain took and crashed the ball to the back of the Cork net, to reduce the margin to a point with the last minute ticking away. Back came Antrim in a last attack. Full forward Lily Scullion seemed to be brought down in possession, but instead of awarding a free referee Phyllis Breslin, who was right on the spot, threw in the ball. A Cork back cleared to touch. Mairéad McAtamney took the line ball about 25 yards out and sent it sailing for the Cork posts but the leather went inches wide in that brave bid for the balancing point, the long whistle blew on the puckout and Cork were champions again.<

== Assessment ==
Both teams were evenly matched throughout the field. The Irish Independent noted:

Fast, spectacular, open camogie, fine striking and superb ball control by both side were features of the final.

The Irish Times reported:

Form start to finish, the crowd was spellbound by the play of both sides and it was a pity that one of them had to lose.

Agnes Hourigan, president of the Camogie Association, wrote in the Irish Press:

The players managed to continue to serve up brilliant camogie even as the ball and the pitch became slippery. Had the rain not come just five minutes before the interval, this must surely have gone on record as the greatest camogie final ever played.

Antrim were the last team to wear the old style tunic in a major final. Cork were the first county to win the senior and junior finals on the same day. Cally Riordan (Youghal) won medals with both teams, playing on the junior team and coming on as a sub for the seniors.

=== Final stages ===
August 12
Semi-Final

Antrim	1-8 – 1-4	Wexford

Wexford Park

1973-9-16
Final
15:00 BST

Cork	2-5 – 3-1	Antrim
Anne Phelan 2-1, Marian McCarthy 0-3, Marion Sweeney 0-1 Cally Riordan 0-1		Lily Scullon 1-0, Mairéad McAtamney 1-0, Chris Boyle 1-0, Sue Cashman 0-1

Croke Park, Dublin
Referee: Phyllis Breslin (Dublin)

Cork	Antrim

CORK:
GK	1	Deirdre Sutton (Glen Rovers)
FB	2	Marie Costine (Cloyne) (Capt)
RWB	3	Hannah -Cotter (South Pres)
CB	4	Sheila Dineen (Canovee)
LWB	5	Mary Whelton (South Pres)
MF	6	Marian McCarthy (South Pres) (0–3)
MF	7	Pat Moloney (UCC)
MF	8	Betty Sugrue (South Pres)
RWF	9	Anne Phelan (Watergrasshill) (2–1)
CF	10	Marion Sweeney (Youghal) (0–1)
LWF	11	Nuala Gilly (Cloyne) (substituted off) 45'
FF	12	Rose Hennessy (UCC)
Substitutes:
CB		Cally Riordan (0–1) for Guilly (substituted on) 45'

(ANTRIM):
GK	1	Sue McLarnon
FB	2	Kathleen Kelly
RWB	3	Josephine Maguire
CB	4	Mairéad Diamond
LWB	5	Jo McClements
MF	6	Rita McAteer
MF	7	Sue Cashman (0–1)
MF	8	Mairéad McAtamney (Capt) (1–0)
RWF	9	Chris O'Boyle (1–0)
CF	10	Bernie Dixon
LWF	11	Nuala Havelin
FF	12	Lily Scullion (1–0)

MATCH RULES

- 50 minutes
- Replay if scores level
- Maximum of 3 substitutions

== See also ==
- All-Ireland Senior Hurling Championship
- Wikipedia List of Camogie players
- National Camogie League
- Camogie All Stars Awards
- Ashbourne Cup

Preceded by All-Ireland Senior Camogie Championship 1972	All-Ireland Senior Camogie Championship; 1932 – present	Succeeded by All-Ireland Senior Camogie Championship 1974
