= 1980 All-Ireland Senior Camogie Championship =

Camogie championship

All-Ireland Senior Camogie Championship 1980
Tournament details
- Date: Sept 28

Winners
- Champions: Cork (12th title)
- Captain: Mary Geaney

Runners-up
- Runners-up: Limerick
- Captain: Geraldine O'Brien

Other
- Matches played: 8

The 1980 All-Ireland Senior Camogie Championship was the high point of the 1980 season. The championship was won by Cork who defeated first time finalists Limerick by a three-point margin in the final in a replay, the first final to be replayed since 1974 and the third in the history of the game. The match drew an attendance of 3,013 including president Paddy Hillery. Limerick had been junior champions in 1977 and qualified for the National Camogie League finals of 1978 and 1979.

== Early Rounds ==
Derry were missing their inspirational midfielder Sarah Anne Quinn for their quarter-final against Limerick. Limerick then surprised Kilkenny in the semi-final.

== Final ==
Anna O'Sullivan scored a last minute goal for Limerick, her second of the day, to draw the final. The fact Limerick grabbed a draw was described by Maol Muire Tynan in the Irish Press as the shock of the camogie season. Anna O'Sullivan scrambled home the equalising goal in the last minute. Tynan wrote

They should in theory have won. They were probably the better team. But Limerick played with utter determination and can only be admired for their grit.

== Replay ==
Cork's match clinching goal in the replay came in the run-in to half time when Limerick goalkeeper Helen Moynihan attempted to solo out the field tipping the ball on her hurl, but failed to clear and the ball was returned to Mary Geaney who scored against the unguarded goal. Cork were leading by six points in the replay when Helen Mulcaire's free from 60 yards dropped towards goal and in the melee was deflected off Bridget O'Brien's shoulder into the net. Maol Muire Tynan, who had played in the 1979 final, wrote in the Irish Press:

With five minutes remaining Helen Mulcaire struck one of the finest goals I have ever seen on a camogie pitch. It was a marvellous free shot from about 30 yards that left the Cork defence gaping, and rose the spirits of a disenchanted crowd of Limerick supporters. Trailing by two points Limerick tried frantically to make up for lost time. Their hopes were finally dashed when Cork got another free from fairly close range and Mary O'Leary pointed again. Time had run out for Limerick. Their attack was too late and on the day the best team won.

=== Final stages ===
June 9
First Round

Dublin	2-8 – 2-4	Clare

Mobhi Road, Dublin

June 9
First Round

Limerick	2-7 – 0-7	Down

June 16
First Round

Kilkenny	4-11 – 1-1	Wexford

Monamolin

June 16
Quarter-Final

Cork	3-7 – 0-5	Antrim

Páirc Uí Chaoimh

July 13
Quarter-Final

Dublin	1-5 – 0-5	Tipperary

Russell Park

July 20
Quarter-Final

Kilkenny	4-10 – 1-7	Galway

Nowlan Park

July 20
Quarter-Final

Limerick	5-8 – 1-1	Derry

Nowlan Park

August 17
Semi-Final

Cork	5-8 – 3-4	Dublin

Church Road, Blackrock

August 17
Semi-Final

Limerick	4-3 – 2-6	Kilkenny

Ballyagran

September 15
Final

Cork	2-7 – 3-4	Limerick

Croke Park, Dublin

October 6
Replay

Cork	1-8 – 2-2	Limerick

Croke Park, Dublin

=== Drawn Final September 15 Cork 2-7 Limerick 3-4 ===
Cork	Limerick

CORK:
GK	1	Marian McCarthy (Éire Óg)
FB	2	Patricia Riordan (Ballinlough)
RWB	3	Miriam Higgins (Éire Óg)
CB	4	Catherine Landers (Killeagh)
LWB	5	Martha Kearney (Na Piarsaigh)
MF	6	Clare Cronin (Old Als)
MF	7	Angela Higgins (Watergrasshill) (0–1)
MF	8	Nancy O'Driscoll (Éire Óg)
RWF	9	Mary O'Leary (Watergrasshill) (2–4)
CF	10	Marion Sweeney (Killeagh)
LWF	11	Pat Moloney (Killeagh) (0–2)
FF	12	Mary Geaney (Éire Óg) (Capt)

LIMERICK:
GK	1	Helena Moynihan (Ballyagran)
FB	2	Joanne O'Shea (Ballyagran)
RWB	3	Vera Mackey (Ballyagran)
CB	4	Geraldine O'Brien (Ballyagran) (Capt) (1–0)
LWB	5	Margie Neville-Dore (Kilfinane)
MF	6	Ber O'Brien (Ballyagran)
MF	7	Helen Mulcair (Kilfinane)
MF	8	Anna Sheehy (Kilfinane)
RWF	9	Anna O'Sullivan (Ballyagran) (2–0)
CF	10	Pauline McCarthy (Ballyagran) (0–3)
LWF	11	Betty Conway (Ballyagran) (0–1)
FF	12	Bríd Stokes (Kilfinane) (1–0)

|}

MATCH RULES

- 50 minutes
- Replay if scores level
- Maximum of 3 substitutions

=== Replay October 6 Cork 1-8 Limerick 2-2 ===
Cork	Limerick

CORK:
GK	1	Marian McCarthy (Éire Óg)
FB	2	Patricia Riordan (Ballinlough)
RWB	3	Miriam Higgins (Éire Óg)
CB	4	Catherine Landers (Killeagh)
LWB	5	Martha Kearney (Na Piarsaigh)
MF	6	Clare Cronin (Old Als)
MF	7	Angela Higgins (Watergrasshill) (0–1)
MF	8	Nancy O'Driscoll (Éire Óg) (0–1)
RWF	9	Mary O'Leary (Watergrasshill) (0–3)
CF	10	Marion Sweeney (Killeagh) (0–1)
LWF	11	Pat Moloney (Killeagh) (0–1)
FF	12	Mary Geaney (Éire Óg) (Capt) (1-1)

LIMERICK:
GK	1	Helena Moynihan (Ballyagran)
FB	2	Joanne O'Shea (Ballyagran)
RWB	3	Vera Mackey (Ballyagran)
CB	4	Geraldine O'Brien (Ballyagran) (Capt) (1–0)
LWB	5	Margie Neville-Dore (Kilfinane)
MF	6	Ber O'Brien (Ballyagran)
MF	7	Helen Mulcair (Kilfinane) (1–0)
MF	8	Anna Sheehy (Kilfinane) (substituted off) 34' (substituted on) 43'
RWF	9	Anna O'Sullivan (Ballyagran)
CF	10	Pauline McCarthy (Ballyagran (0–2)
LWF	11	Betty Conway (Ballyagran) (substituted off) 30'
FF	12	Bríd Stokes (Kilfinane)
Substitutes:
MF		Bridget O'Brien (Ballyagran) for Betty Conway (substituted on) 30'
FF		Martine O'Donoghue for Ann Sheehy (substituted on) 34' (substituted off) 43'
FF		Anna Sheehy for Martine O'Donoghue (substituted on) 43'

MATCH RULES

- 50 minutes
- Replay if scores level
- Maximum of 3 substitutions

== See also ==
- All-Ireland Senior Hurling Championship
- Wikipedia List of Camogie players
- National Camogie League
- Camogie All Stars Awards
- Ashbourne Cup

Preceded by All-Ireland Senior Camogie Championship 1979	All-Ireland Senior Camogie Championship; 1932 – present	Succeeded by All-Ireland Senior Camogie Championship 1981
