= Con Geaney =

Irish Gaelic footballer

Personal information
- Native name: Conchur Ó Géibheannaigh (Irish)
- Born: 16 August 1907 Firies, County Kerry, Ireland
- Died: 9 September 1988 (aged 81) Wilton, Cork, Ireland
- Occupation: National school teacher

Sport
- Sport: Gaelic football
- Position: Right wing-forward
Clubs
- Years: Club
- John Mitchels; Castleisland Desmonds
Club titles
- Kerry titles: 1
Inter-county
Years	County	Apps (scores)
1931-1938	Kerry	15 (2-09)
Inter-county titles
- Munster titles: 6
- All-Irelands: 2
- NFL: 2

Cornelius Geaney (16 August 1907 – 9 September 1988) was an Irish Gaelic footballer who played at club level with John Mitchels and Castleisland Desmonds and at inter-county level with the Kerry senior football team. He usually lined out as a forward.

== Career ==
Geaney first came to Gaelic football prominence as a member of the John Mitchels club that won the County Championship title in 1929. He was drafted onto the Kerry senior football team two years later, however, an injury ruled him out of the 1931 All-Ireland final win over Kildare. Geaney won his only All-Ireland medal on the field of play after Kerry's 2-07 to 2-04 win over Mayo in the 1932 All-Ireland final. He continued to line out with Kerry over the following few seasons and claimed a third winners' medal, his second as a substitute, in 1937. Geaney's other honours with Kerry include six Munster Championship titles and two National Football League medals.

== Personal life and death ==
Born in Firies, County Kerry, Geaney qualified as a national school teacher and spent his adult life working in Castleisland. His son, Dave Geaney, is an All-Ireland-winning player and selector with Kerry, while his daughter, Mary Geaney, is a dual All-Ireland-winner and a former Ireland women's field hockey international.

Geaney died after a brief illness at the Regional Hospital in Cork on 9 September 1988.

== Honours ==
John Mitchels

- Kerry Senior Football Championship: 1929

Kerry

- All-Ireland Senior Football Championship: 1931, 1932, 1937
- Munster Senior Football Championship: 1931, 1932, 1933, 1934, 1937, 1938
- National Football League: 1930–31, 1931–32
