= 1979 All-Ireland Senior Camogie Championship =

Camogie championship

All-Ireland Senior Camogie Championship 1979
Tournament details
- Date: Sept 9

Winners
- Champions: Antrim (6th title)
- Captain: Mairéad McAtamney

Runners-up
- Runners-up: Tipperary
- Captain: Maureen Maher

Other
- Matches played: 2

The 1979 All-Ireland Senior Camogie Championship was the high point of the 1979 season. The championship was won by Antrim who defeated Tipperary by a three-point margin in the final. The match drew an attendance of 2,900.

== Semi-finals ==
Kilkenny disposed of reigning champions Cork at Douglas by 4–5 to 0–10 on June 17 in the first round of the most open championship draw since the open draw was introduced six years earlier. Cork pleaded with some justification that midfielder Clare Cronin was nursing a leg injury, Marie Costine was ill and Pat Moloney had unexpectedly announced her retirement from the game. Antrim then surprised championship favourites Kilkenny by 5–5 to 4–3 at Randalstown on July 29 with two goals each from Kathleen McCaughey and Philomena Gillespie while Angela Downey scored three breakaway goals for Kilkenny.

Antrim went on to defeat Wexford, in the All Ireland semi-final at the same venue. A Margaret Griffin goal in the first half gave Tipperary victory over Limerick who were contesting their first ever senior semi-final.

== Final ==
Irish Press journalist Maol Muire Tynan, who played for Tipperary against Antrim in the 1979 All-Ireland final, wrote about her experience in the following day's newspaper. Her piece reflects the frustrations of a defeated player, as well as those of an inter-county camogie player in the face of the general apathy shown towards women's sport:

Even when the lead slipped away from us, we fought back, desperate to inscribed our name on an All-Ireland trophy. But Fate, or, should I say, Antrim’s sheer talent and abundant stamina, interfered with our plans. Yesterday’s weather in Croke Park provided the perfect setting to an exciting duel. It was regrettable that those natural elements were not complemented by properly defined sidelines or freshly painted goal posts. Yet this game was a cracking performance of speed and skill. The few thousand supporters, all confined to the Hogan Stand, showed their appreciation as enthusiastically as the 53,535 who thronged it the previous week. The first 25 minutes were magical for Tipperary and by half time it seemed that the O'Duffy was southward bound. But our confidence was unjustified, the scoreboard did not reflect the run of play. While our forwards were running through a crumbling Antrim defence, their efforts rarely came to fruitful conclusion. This was due to the incredible anticipation of Antrim goalkeeper Carol Blaney who celebrated her 21st birthday in style. Antrim have successfully overcome the restrictions and difficulties the game has faced during the past decade. For the superb Antrim side, it is the resurrection of camogie in Northern ranks, while we in the Premier County, with our long, impressive tradition of hurling, must painfully carry out the post mortem on our sister game.

=== Final stages ===
June 17

Kilkenny	4-5 – 0-10	Cork

Douglas

June 17

Antrim	2-9 – 0-2	Galway

Ballindereen

July 15

Limerick	3-6 – 3-5	Dublin

Russell Park

July 15

Tipperary	4-3 – 4-1	Down

Moneygall

July 22

Wexford	4-7 – 1-4	Clare

Clonroche

July 29

Antrim	5-5 – 4-3	Kilkenny

Randalstown

August 19
Semi-Final

Antrim	3-5 – 0-1	Wexford

Randalstown

August 12
Semi-Final

Tipperary	1-6 – 0-6	Limerick

Bruree

1979-9-9
Final
15:00 BST

Antrim	2-5 – 1-4	Tipperary
Ann McAllister 1-2, Kathleen McCaughey 1-0, Mairéad Quinn 0-1		Siobhán McDonnell 1-0, Deirdre Lane 0-1, Sheila Delaney 0-1, Mary Griffin 0-1

Croke Park, Dublin
Attendance: 2,900
Referee: Sheila McNamee (Dublin)

Antrim	Tipperary

ANTRIM:
GK	1	Carol Blaney (Tom Williams)
FB	2	Mairéad Donnelly
RWB	3	Mary McMullan (Loughguile)
CB	4	Jo McClements (Loughguile)
LWB	5	Jackie McAtamney (Portglenone)
MF	6	Siobhán McAtamney (Portglenone)
MF	7	Mairéad Magill (Capt) (Portglenone)
MF	8	Rita Moran (Creggan)
RWF	9	Philomena Gillespie (Loughguile)
CF	10	Mairéad Quinn (0–1) (substituted off) Half time'
LWF	11	Ann McAllister (1–2)
FF	12	Kathleen McCaughey (1–0)
Substitutes:
MF		Maeve O'Hagan for Mairéad Quinn (substituted on) Half time'

(TIPPERARY):
GK	1	Mary O'Brien (Portroe)
FB	2	Monica Butler (Drom-Inch)
RWB	3	Maura Hackett (Portroe)
CB	4	Deirdre Lane (Celtic) (0–1)
LWB	5	Rosie Ryan (St Bernadette's Roscrea)
MF	6	Maureen Maher (Drom-Inch) (Capt)
MF	7	Sheila Delaney (Drom-Inch) (0–1)
MF	8	Mary Griffin (St Mary's Newport-Kilcommon) ( (0–1) (substituted off) 50'
RWF	9	Mona Quigley (Portroe)
CF	10	Agnes Brophy (Lorrha)
LWF	11	Maol Muire Tynan (Drom-Inch)
FF	12	Siobhán Tynan?Siobhán Tynan-McDonnell (Drom-Inch) (1–0)
Substitutes:
MF		Ann Ralph (Moycarkey) for Mary Griffin (substituted on) 50'

MATCH RULES

- 50 minutes
- Replay if scores level
- Maximum of 3 substitutions

== See also ==
- All-Ireland Senior Hurling Championship
- Wikipedia List of Camogie players
- National Camogie League
- Camogie All Stars Awards
- Ashbourne Cup

Preceded by All-Ireland Senior Camogie Championship 1978	All-Ireland Senior Camogie Championship; 1932 – present	Succeeded by All-Ireland Senior Camogie Championship 1980
