= 1979 All-Ireland Senior Camogie Championship final =

1979 All-Ireland Senior Camogie Final
- Event: All-Ireland Senior Camogie Championship 1979
Antrim	Tipperary
2-3	1-3
- Date: 9 September 1979
- Venue: Croke Park, Dublin
- Referee: Sheila McNamee (Dublin)
- Attendance: 2,900

The 1979 All-Ireland Senior Camogie Championship Final, the 48th event of its type, is the culmination of the 1979 All-Ireland Senior Camogie Championship.

Tipperary led 1–1 to 0–2 at half-time, but Antrim surpassed them, to ultimately secure the win in a low-scoring final.
