= Dual player =

Term used in Ireland to describe a person competing in multiple sports

Dual player or dual star is a term used in Hiberno-English to describe someone who competes in multiple sports — for example, in Victorian Ireland, cricket and hurling. The term today in Gaelic games typically describes a male player who plays both Gaelic football and hurling or, if a female player, a player of ladies' Gaelic football and camogie. The player does not necessarily have to play at the same standard in both sports. The number of dual stars at county level has decreased recently due to the increasing demands placed upon the best players of both sports.

== List of dual players with All-Ireland titles ==
| Name | Team(s) | All-Ireland SHC titles | All-Ireland SFC titles |
|---|---|---|---|
| Kerins, Alan | Galway | — | 2001 |
| Barry-Murphy, Jimmy | Cork | 1976, 1977, 1978, 1984, 1986 | 1973 |
| Beckett, Derry | Cork | 1942 | 1945 |
| Blaney, Greg | Down | — | 1991, 1994 |
| Burke, Frank | Dublin | 1917, 1920 | 1921, 1922, 1923 |
| Cadogan, Eoin | Cork | — | 2010 |
| Collins, Podge | Clare | 2013 | — |
| Collins, Seán | Clare | 2013 | — |
| Coughlan, Denis | Cork | 1976, 1977, 1978 | 1973 |
| Cregan, Éamonn | Limerick | 1973 | — |
| Cummins, Brendan | Tipperary | 2001, 2010 | — |
| Cummins, Ray | Cork | 1970, 1976, 1977, 1978 | 1973 |
| Currams, Liam | Offaly | 1981 | 1982 |
| Ferguson, Des | Dublin | — | 1958, 1963 |
| Foley, Lar | Dublin | — | 1958, 1963 |
| Grace, Pierce | Dublin; Kilkenny | 1911, 1912, 1913 | 1906, 1907 |
| Lynch, Jack | Cork | 1941, 1942, 1943, 1944, 1946 | 1945 |
| Mackessy, Billy | Cork | 1903 | 1911 |
| McCarthy, Teddy | Cork | 1986, 1990 | 1989, 1990 |
| Mackey, Paddy | Wexford | 1910 | 1915, 1916, 1917, 1918 |
| Markham, Liam | Clare | 2013 | — |
| McGrath, Leonard | Galway | 1923 | 1925 |
| McInerney, Cathal | Clare | 2013 | — |
| Murphy, Brian | Cork | 1976, 1977, 1978 | 1973 |
| Ó hAilpín, Seán Óg | Cork | 1999, 2004, 2005 | — |
| O'Halloran, Davy | Clare | 2013 | — |
| O'Kennedy, Seán | Wexford | 1910 | 1915, 1916, 1917 |
| O'Neill, Alan | Clare | 2013 | — |
| Spain, W. J. | Dublin; Limerick | 1887 | 1889 |
| Walsh, Aidan | Cork | — | 2010 |
| Walsh, Denis | Cork | 1986, 1990 | 1989, 1990 |
| Wilson, Marcus | Dublin | — | 1958 |

In 1990, Teddy McCarthy of Cork became the first player to win both a football and a hurling All-Ireland in the same year. This unique achievement remains intact as of 2026.

Ex-Taoiseach Jack Lynch won one football and five hurling All-Irelands with Cork during the 1940s.

== List of dual players with All Stars in both codes ==
A few players have won All Star Awards in both codes. These include:

- Jimmy Barry-Murphy
- Ray Cummins
- Liam Currams
- Brian Murphy

Ray Cummins has uniquely won an All Star Award in both hurling and Gaelic football in the same year, 1971.

== Ladies' Gaelic football/camogie ==
| Player | Gaelic football | Camogie | Football All Stars | Camogie All Stars |
|---|---|---|---|---|
| Rena Buckley ^{(Note 1)} | Cork | Cork | 6 | 5 |
| Naomi Carroll ^{(Note 2)} | Clare | Limerick/Clare | 0 | 0 |
| Briege Corkery | Cork | Cork | 10 | 6 |
| Mary Geaney ^{(Note 2)} ^{(Note 3)} | Kerry | Cork | 0 | 0 |
| Michelle Magee ^{(Note 4)} | Antrim | Antrim | 0 | 0 |
| Aisling McCarthy | Tipperary | Cahir GAA | 0 | 0 |
| Mary O'Connor | Cork | Cork | 1 | 3 |
| Fiona O'Driscoll | Cork | Cork | 1 | 1 |
| Rachel Ruddy | Dublin | Dublin | 2 | 0 |
| Angela Walsh | Cork | Cork | 6 | 0 |

Notes

- ^1 Rena Buckley, was the first player to captain Cork teams to both the All-Ireland Senior Ladies' Football Championship and the All-Ireland Senior Camogie Championship. In 2012 she captained the Cork senior ladies' football team and in 2017 she captained the Cork senior camogie team.
- ^2 Naomi Carroll and Mary Geaney were also Ireland women's field hockey internationals
- ^3 Mary Geaney became the first player to captain a team to both the All-Ireland Senior Ladies' Football Championship and the All-Ireland Senior Camogie Championship. In 1976 she captained Kerry when they won the All-Ireland Senior Ladies' Football Championship. In 1980 she captained the Cork senior camogie team.
- ^4 Michelle Magee is also a Northern Ireland netball international. She played camogie at under-14 level for Antrim.

== Dual county ==
Dual county is a similar term for counties that have teams that play at the same level in both football and hurling.

== Dual manager ==
The definition of a dual manager is Anthony Cunningham.
