= M. C. B. Mason =

Methodist Episcopal Church clergy (1859–1915)

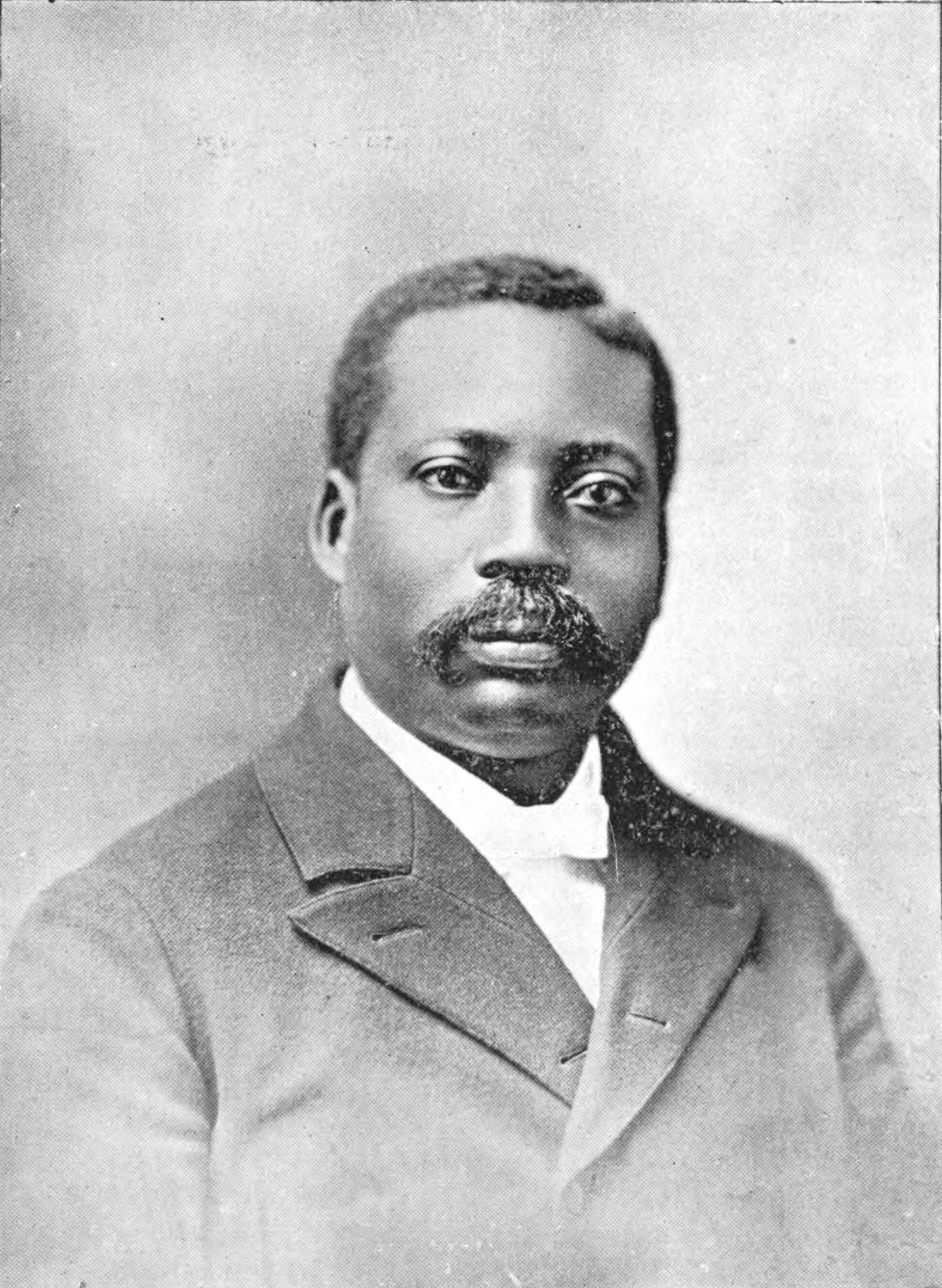

Madison Charles Butler Mason (1859–1915) was an African American reverend known for his pulpit oratory in the Methodist Episcopal Church. A native of Louisiana, he addressed the church's Congress on Africa at the age of 36 in 1895. At the Congress, Mason told African American that they had rights to remain and claim American full citizenship but the obligation for evangelizing Africa was upon them by "racial affinity, by providential preparation, by special adaptation, by divine command". Just within a year working with the mission he was elected secretary of the Freedmen's Aids and Southern Education Society, the first African American to be elected to the position.

He and Mary E. Mason wrote Solving the Problem published in 1917.

== See also ==
- Miriam Higgins Thomas
