= David Geaney (Castleisland Gaelic footballer) =

Irish Gaelic footballer (born 1940)

Personal information
- Born: 10 August 1940 (age 86) County Kerry, Ireland

Sport
- Sport: Gaelic football
Club
- Years: Club
- Castleisland Desmonds
Inter-county
- Years: County
- 1959–1966: Kerry
Inter-county titles
- Munster titles: 3
- All-Irelands: 2
- NFL: 3
		2	2
Inter-county management
- Years: Team
- 2007–2008: Kerry
Inter-county titles as manager
County	League	Province	All-Ireland
Kerry	1	1	1

David Geaney (born 10 August 1940) is an Irish former Gaelic football player.

He won All-Ireland medals for Kerry in 1959 and 1962.

== GAA Career ==
Geaney played for the senior Kerry team from 1959 to 1966. He played in his first All-Ireland final in 1959 at the age of 19 as Kerry ended up winning in the final. He had played schoolboys rugby for Munster earlier that year.

He played in the All-Ireland semi-final in 1962 against Dublin but did not feature in the final as Kerry came out victors over Roscommon. Geaney came on as a substitute in the 1965 All-Ireland final as Kerry lost out to Galway. He featured in three Munster finals for Kerry, winning all three.

Geaney was manager of the Castleisland Desmonds senior team for many years and was trainer when they won the All-Ireland Club title in 1985, when they defeated St. Vincent's (Dublin) in the final on St. Patrick's Day. He was manager during the glory period of the Desmonds, with highlights including their first North Kerry Senior Football Championship win, Intermediate and club championship wins, two All-Ireland club finals in a row (1984 and 1985) as well as being manager for Desmonds only appearance in a county final when they were beaten by eventual All-Ireland Champions, Dr. Crokes. He was also manager of the Castleisland District team in the 1979 county final.

Geaney was a Kerry GAA medical officer from 1975 to 2012. He was named by new Kerry manager Pat O'Shea as a selector for the 2007 All-Ireland Senior Football Championship. Kerry won the 2007 Championship and reached the 2008 final.

== Personal life ==
David Geaney is the son of Con Geaney, a member of the Kerry team that won the 1932 All-Ireland Senior Football Championship. In 1976 his sister, Mary Geaney, captained Kerry when they won the All-Ireland Senior Ladies' Football Championship and in 1980 she captained Cork when they won the All-Ireland Senior Camogie Championship. She is also a former Ireland women's field hockey international.
