= 1980 All-Ireland Senior Camogie Championship final =

1980 All-Ireland Senior Camogie Final
- Event: All-Ireland Senior Camogie Championship 1980
| Cork | Limerick |
| 2-7 | 3-4 |
- Date: 14 September 1980
- Venue: Croke Park, Dublin
- Referee: Rosina MacManus (Antrim)
- Attendance: 2,700

1980 All-Ireland Senior Camogie Final Replay
| Cork | Limerick |
| 1-8 | 2-2 |
- Date: 28 September 1974
- Venue: Croke Park, Dublin
- Referee: Rosina MacManus (Antrim)
- Attendance: 3,013

The 1980 All-Ireland Senior Camogie Championship Final, the 49th event of its type, is the culmination of the 1980 All-Ireland Senior Camogie Championship.

The first game was a very close affair, culminating with a dubious point that gifted Cork a three-point lead with two minutes of the game to go, but only for then straight from the puckout Limerick scoring a goal that was the equalising one. In the replay, Cork were in the lead by 1-6 to 0-1 with fifteen minutes of the replay left, and then came a late Limerick rally which involved getting two goals for Limerick but not even this couldn't stop what ultimately went down as a Cork win.
