= Helen Roche =

British academic and author

- Born: Helen Roche

Academic background
- Education: University of Cambridge

Helen Roche is a British historian and an associate professor in modern European cultural history at Durham University.

== Academic career ==
Roche attended Leweston School in Dorset before studying classics at Gonville and Caius College, Cambridge, from 2004 to 2012, where she completed her doctorate under the supervision of Paul Cartledge, Robin Osborne, and Brendan Simms. She held research fellowships at Lucy Cavendish College, Cambridge and the Institute of Advanced Studies at University College London before taking up a permanent post at Durham University. Her research is in German history, classical reception, the comparative study of fascism, the history of education, and related areas. At Durham University, she is an associate fellow of the Institute of Advanced Study.

In 2021, Roche published The Third Reich’s Elite Schools: A History of the Napolas. This study of the German National Political Institutes of Education has been praised as an important contribution to the history of Nazi Germany. Several British newspapers reported on Roche’s uncovering the links between the Napolas and elite British private schools in the 1930s. In March 2022, she was interviewed on this subject on the Free Thinking programme on BBC Radio 3.

== Books ==
- The Third Reich’s Elite Schools: A History of the Napolas, Oxford University Press, 2021
- Sparta’s German Children: The Ideal of Ancient Sparta in the Royal Prussian Cadet-Corps, 1818-1920, and in National-Socialist Elite Schools (the Napolas), 1933-1945, Classical Press of Wales, 2013
- Brill's Companion to the Classics, Fascist Italy and Nazi Germany, edited, with Kyriakos Demetriou, Brill, 2018
