= Mary Griffin =

American politician (1926–2022)

Member of the New Hampshire House of Representatives from the 7th Rockingham district
- In office December 4, 1996 – June 14, 2022

Personal details
- Born: Mary Elizabeth Hart; May 16, 1926 Lynn, Massachusetts, U.S.
- Died: June 14, 2022 (aged 96) Windham, New Hampshire, U.S.
- Party: Republican
- Occupation: retired legal secretary, TV host

Mary Elizabeth Griffin (née Hart; May 16, 1926 – June 14, 2022) was an American politician in the state of New Hampshire. She was a member of the New Hampshire House of Representatives, sitting as a Republican from the Rockingham 7 district, having been first elected in 1996. She was most recently reelected in 2020. She received her education at Pierce Secretarial College in Boston, Massachusetts. Griffin served as an assistant Republican whip.

Griffin died in Windham on June 14, 2022, at the age of 96.
