= Pat Lenihan =

Camogie player

Personal information
- Native name: Pádraigín Ní Leannacháin (Irish)
- Born: County Cork, Ireland

Sport
- Sport: Camogie
- Position: centre field, half forward
Club*
Years	Club	Apps (scores)
1980-88	Killeagh	?
Inter-county**
Years	County	Apps (scores)
1980-83	Cork	?
- * club appearances and scores correct as of (16:31, 30 June 2010 (UTC)). **Inter County team apps and scores correct as of (16:31, 30 June 2010 (UTC)).

Patricia ‘Pat’ Lenihan is a former camogie player, captain of the All Ireland Camogie Championship winning team in 1982.

== Career ==
She scored two goals in Cork's 1982 All Ireland 7-8 to 3-10 semi-final victory over Kilkenny and an early goal in the final – the match had started with a Dublin goal and Lenihan replied immediately with another. In 1983 she was the winner of the Jury's Sports Camogie Player of the Year award.
