= Sheila McNamee =

American academic

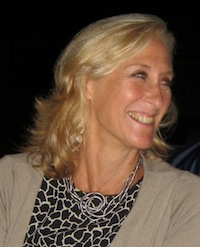
- Sheila McNamee
- Website: http://pubpages.unh.edu/~smcnamee/

Sheila McNamee is an American academic known for her work in human communication and social constructionism theory and practice. She is a Professor of Communication at the University of New Hampshire and founding member, Vice President and board member of the Taos Institute. She has authored numerous, books, chapters, and journal articles. Her work focuses on appreciative dialogic transformation within a variety of social and institutional contexts including psychotherapy, organizations, education, healthcare, and local communities. She engages constructionist practices in a variety of contexts to bring communities of participants with diametrically opposing viewpoints together to create livable futures.

McNamee is married to a scholar of communication (Professor John Lannamann). They reside in Durham, New Hampshire.

== Work ==
=== Founding Member ===
McNamee is a founder, board member and vice president of the Taos Institute. The Taos Institute is a nonprofit educational organization dedicated to the development of social constructionist theory and practices for purposes of world benefit. With over two hundred Associates around the world, the Taos Institute achieves their educational ends through conferences, workshops, publications, a Ph.D. program, distance learning programs, newsletters, learning networks, and web-based offerings. The Taos Institute also engages in collaborative partnerships with other national and international organizations.

Constructionist theory and practice locates the source of meaning, value, and action in relational process. Through our shared constructions of the real, the rational and the good, communities are formed and ways of life secured. New ways of life can also be envisioned and created through relational processes. And when communities conflict, it is also through such process that peace may best be restored.

=== Awards ===
Awards received by McNamee include Class of 1944 Professorship at the University of New Hampshire (2001-2004) and the Lindberg Award for Outstanding Scholar/Teacher in the College of Liberal Arts at the University of New Hampshire (2007–2008). Most recently, Sheila was added to the Fulbright Specialists Roster (2012-2017) and received a Fulbright Specialist Grant to work with faculty and students at the University of Caldas in Manizales, Colombia (May–June, 2012), exploring social constructionist theory and practice in social work, family development, social sciences, social research, conflict resolution, and mediation.

"Rather than approach conflict and problem solving with the goal of minimizing differences among perspectives and working toward consensus, we must develop processes for creating a system of co-existence and collaboration that entails incommensurate but respected positions of difference. If you understand how communication creates a way of seeing the world, you can understand how those different views are internally coherent; starting from this position, we invite ourselves and others to become curious about our differences (first) rather than judgmental." said McNamee

=== Author ===
Sheila McNamee is the author of several books on social construction.

Sheila co-authored Relational Responsibility: Resources for Sustainable Dialogue (1992) with Kenneth Gergen. In Relational Responsibility, Sheila and Ken question the tradition of individual responsibility and transform the concept of responsibility by giving centre stage to the relational process rather than to the individual - replacing alienation and isolation with meaningful dialogue.

McNamee co-authored Research and Social Change: A Relational Constructionist Approach (2012) with Dian Marie Hosking. In this book, Sheila and Dian Marie bridge scholarly forms of inquiry and practitioners’ daily activities. They introduce inquiry as a process of relational construction, offering resources to practitioners who want to reflect on how their work generates practical effects. Sheila and Diane Marie lay out relational constructionist premises and explore these in terms of their generative possibilities both for inquiry and social change work.

==== Selected Books and Book Chapters ====
- McNamee, S. and Gergen, K. J. (Eds.) (1992). Therapy as Social Construction. London: Sage. ISBN 0-8039-8303-4
- McNamee, S. and Gergen, K.J. (1999). Relational Responsibility: Resources for Sustainable Dialogue. Thousand Oaks, California: Sage. ISBN 0-7619-1094-8
- Deissler, K. G. and McNamee, S. (Eds.). (2000). Philosophy in Therapy: The Social Poetics of Therapeutic Conversation. (Phil und Sophie auf der couch: Die soziale poesie therapeutischer gesprache). Heidelberg: Carl Auer Systeme Verlag.
- Hosking, D. and McNamee, S. (Eds.) (2006). The Social Construction of Organization Malmo, Sweden: Liber and Copenhagen Business School Press. ISBN 87-630-0165-9
- Anderson, H., Cooperrider, D., Gergen, K., Gergen, M., McNamee, S. and Whitney, D. (2008, 2nd edition). The Appreciative Organization. Ohio: Taos Institute Publications. ISBN 0-9712312-7-3
- McNamee, S. and Hosking, D.M. (2012). Research and Social Change: A Relational Constructionist Approach. New York: Routledge. ISBN 978-0-415-80671-8*McNamee, S. (under review). "The difference of dialogue: Toward a relational ethic." In M. Riemslagh (Ed.), After you: Human Sciences on ethics in dialogical counselling. Leuven, Belgium: Academic Publisher Peeters.
- McNamee, S. and Moscheta, M. (in press). "Relational intelligence and collaborative learning." In G. J. van Schalkwyk and R.C. D’Amato (Eds.), Achieving Excellence in Asian University Teaching: Collaborative Knowledge Construction in Higher Education. New York: Springer.
- McNamee, S. (in press). "Constructing Values and Beliefs: A Relational Approach to Sustainable Development." In J. Appleton (Ed.), Including Attitudes and Values in Sustainability Development Research. Cheltenham, England: Edward Elgar Publishing.
- McNamee, S. (2011). "Relational responsibility and clinical ethics." In M. Bianciardi and F. Galvez Sanchez (Eds.), Psicoterapia come etica: Conditizione postmoderna e responsabilita clinica ("Psychotherapy as Ethics: The Postmodern Condition and Clinical Responsibility." Torino, Italy: Antigone di Torino (Italian edition) and Santiago, Chile: Editorial Universitaria di Santiago del Chile (Spanish edition).
- McNamee, S. (2007). "Relational practices in education: Teaching as conversation." In Harlene Anderson and Diane Gehart (Eds.), Collaborative Therapy: Relationships and Conversations that Make a Difference. London: Brunner-Routledge, 313-335.
- McNamee, S. (2005). Creating new organizational realities together – theory meets practice. M. McKergow and J. Clarke (Eds.), Positive approaches to change: Applications of solutions focus and appreciative inquiry at work. Cheltenham, UK: SolutionBooks, 25-37.
- McNamee, S. (2004). "Social construction as practical theory: Lessons for practice and reflection in psychotherapy." In D. Pare and G. Larner, Collaborative practice in psychology and therapy. New York: Haworth Press, Inc., 9-21.
- McNamee, S. (2004). "Relational bridges between constructionism and constructivism." In J.D. Raskin and S.K. Bridges (Eds.), Studies in meaning 2: Bridging the personal and social in constructivist psychology. New York: Pace University Press, 37-50.
- McNamee, S. and Shotter, J. (2004). "Dialogue, creativity, and change." In R. Anderson, L. Baxter, and K. Cissna (Eds.), Dialogic approaches to communication. Thousand Oaks, CA: Sage Publication, 91-104.
