= 1976 All-Ireland Senior Ladies' Football Championship final =

1976 All-Ireland Senior Ladies' Football Final
- Event: 1976 All-Ireland Senior Ladies' Football Championship
| Kerry | Offaly |
| 4–6 | 1–5 |
- Date: 10 October 1976
- Venue: Littleton, County Tipperary

The 1976 All-Ireland Senior Ladies' Football Championship final was the third All-Ireland Final and the deciding match of the 1976 All-Ireland Senior Ladies' Football Championship, an inter-county ladies' Gaelic football tournament for the top teams in Ireland.

Offaly dominated the early stages but Noreen Thompson at right corner back defended well and Kerry ran out ten-point winners, Mary Geaney scoring 3–2.
