= Ann Comerford =

Irish camogie player

Personal information
- Native name: Áine Ní Chumascaigh (Irish)
- Born: County Cork, Ireland

Sport
- Sport: Camogie
- Position: centre field
Club*
Years	Club	Apps (scores)
	South Presentation PP	?
Inter-county**
Years	County	Apps (scores)
1967-72	Cork	?
Inter-county titles
- All-Irelands: 2
- * club appearances and scores correct as of (16:31, 30 June 2010 (UTC)). **Inter County team apps and scores correct as of (16:31, 30 June 2010 (UTC)).

Ann Comerford is a former camogie player, captain of the All Ireland Camogie Championship winning team in 1970. She won a second All Ireland senior medal in 1972.

== Career ==
She scored two goals in the 1971 defeat of Wexford. Although injured she came on the 1971 All Ireland Club Championship semi-final for South Presentation Past Pupils.
