= Liz Garvan =

Irish camogie player

Personal information
- Native name: Eilís Ní Gharbháin (Irish)
- Born: County Cork, Ireland

Sport
- Sport: Camogie
Club*
Years	Club	Apps (scores)
	Old Aloysius	?
Inter-county**
Years	County	Apps (scores)
	Cork	?
- * club appearances and scores correct as of (16:31, 30 June 2010 (UTC)). **Inter County team apps and scores correct as of (16:31, 30 June 2010 (UTC)).

Elizabeth Garvan is a camogie player, scorer of 3-6 of Cork's total of 5–7 in the All Ireland final of 1970. She won further All Ireland senior medals in 1971, 1972 and 1973.

== Career ==
She was still at school when chosen to play for Cork in the Munster championship of 1968 and for Munster in the Gael Linn Cup the following autumn, winning the Munster camogie player of the year award en route. She won Ashbourne Cup medals with UCC in their 1971-4 three-in-a-row.
