= Nancy O'Driscoll =

Irish camogie and field hockey player

Personal information
- Native name: Áine Ní Dhrisceoil (Irish)
- Born: County Cork, Ireland

Sport
- Sport: Camogie
- Position: centre field
Clubs*
Years	Club	Apps (scores)
	Éire Óg & Valley Rovers	?
Inter-county**
Years	County	Apps (scores)
	Cork	?
- * club appearances and scores correct as of (16:31, 30 June 2010 (UTC)). **Inter County team apps and scores correct as of (16:31, 30 June 2010 (UTC)).

Ann 'Nancy' O'Driscoll is a former camogie player, captain of the All Ireland Camogie Championship winning team in 1978 and captain of the All Ireland junior winning team of 1973. She made her senior debut in 1974, played in that year's replayed All Ireland final and won a second All Ireland senior medal in 1980. She played field hockey for Ireland and also excelled at badminton.

== Career ==
One of six camogie playing sisters, she won five Cork county championships with Éire Óg and a Munster club championship in 1985 and played for Valley Rovers until 1995 when she appeared in the county Junior B final.
