= Mary Geaney =

Irish sportswoman

Personal information
- Native name: Máire Nic Éanna (Irish)
- Born: 1954 (age 71–72) Castleisland, County Kerry; Ireland

Sport
- Sport: Camogie; Ladies' Gaelic football
- Position: Forward
Clubs
- Years: Club
- Castleisland Desmonds; UCC; Éire Óg
Inter-county
- Years: County
- 1973–198x 1978–1988: Kerry (Gaelic football); Cork (camogie)
Inter-county titles
- All-Irelands: 4

Mary Geaney (born 1954) is an Irish sportswoman. She played senior ladies' Gaelic football for Kerry, senior camogie for Cork and is also a former Ireland women's field hockey international. In 1976 she captained Kerry when they won the All-Ireland Senior Ladies' Football Championship and in 1980 she captained Cork when they won the All-Ireland Senior Camogie Championship. She was the first player to captain a team to both championships. As a field hockey international, she was a member of the Ireland team that won the 1983 Women's Intercontinental Cup. In 2010 she was inducted into the Irish Hockey Association Hall of Fame.

== Early years, family and education ==
Mary Geaney is the daughter of Con Geaney, a member of the Kerry team that won the 1932 All-Ireland Senior Football Championship. Her brother, David Geaney, was a member of the Kerry team that won the same All-Ireland championship in 1959. She was educated at the Ursuline Secondary School in Blackrock, Cork.

== Ladies' Gaelic football ==
Geaney began playing ladies' Gaelic football for Castleisland Desmonds. In 1973 she played for Kerry against Cork in one of the first ladies' Gaelic football games between the two counties. Kerry won by 5–10 to 4–11 with Geaney scoring 2–6. In 1974 she played for Kerry when they lost to Tipperary in the first Munster Senior Ladies' Football Championship final. In 1976 she captained Kerry when they won the All-Ireland Senior Ladies' Football Championship, defeating Offaly by 4–6 to 1–5. With 3–2, Geany was also the top scorer in the final. She also scored the first ever hat-trick in a Ladies' All-Ireland final. Geaney also won the All-Ireland Ladies Club Football Championship with Castleisland Desmonds. She also represented Munster at interprovincial level.

== Camogie ==
Geaney played camogie for Castleisland Desmonds and Éire Óg. Between 1978 and 1988 she also played for Cork in six All-Ireland Senior Camogie Championship finals. Geaney finished on the winning side in 1978, 1980 and 1983. In six finals she scored 7–5. In the 1978 final she scored a hat-trick of goals and in 1980 she captained the winning Cork team. She also represented Munster at interprovincial level in the Gael Linn Cup.

== Field hockey ==
Mary Geaney
Sport
- Sport: Field hockey
Youth career
- Team
- –: Ursuline School
Senior career
| Years | Team | Caps | Goals |
| 197x–199x | Old Ursulines | - | - |
| 1970–19xx | → Munster | - | - |
National team
| Years | Team | Caps | Goals |
| 1971–198x | Ireland | 61 | - |

Geaney played field hockey for Old Ursulines (Cork), Munster and Ireland. She made her senior international debut in 1971 against England. She subsequently made 61 senior appearances for Ireland. She was a member of the Ireland teams that won the 1977 Triple Crown and the 1983 Women's Intercontinental Cup. In 2010, together with her former teammate, Margaret Gleghorne, she was inducted into the Irish Hockey Association Hall of Fame.

| Tournaments | Place |
|---|---|
| 1983 Women's Intercontinental Cup | 1st |
| 1984 Women's EuroHockey Nations Championship | 5th |

== Other sports ==
Geaney has also played squash, badminton and golf for Munster. She is a member of the Killarney Golf & Fishing Club.

== Honours ==
=== Ladies' Gaelic football ===
Kerry

- All-Ireland Senior Ladies' Football Championship
  - Winners: 1976

Castleisland Desmonds

- All-Ireland Ladies Club Football Championship
  - Winners: 1980, 1983

=== Camogie ===
Cork

- All-Ireland Senior Camogie Championship
  - Winners: 1978, 1980, 1983
  - Runners Up: 1981, 1987, 1988
- National Camogie League
  - Winners: 1986
  - Runners Up: 1977–78, 1981, 1982

Munster

- Gael Linn Cup
  - Runners Up: 1979, 1983

UCC

- Ashbourne Cup
  - Winners:

=== Field hockey ===
Ireland

- Women's Intercontinental Cup
  - Winners: 1983
- Triple Crown
  - Winners: 1977
