= Betty Sugrue =

Irish camogie player

Personal information
- Native name: Eilís Ní Shiochrú (Irish)
- Born: County Cork, Ireland

Sport
- Sport: Camogie
- Position: centre field
Club*
Years	Club	Apps (scores)
	South Presentation PP	?
Inter-county**
Years	County	Apps (scores)
1967-74	Cork	?
- * club appearances and scores correct as of (16:31, 30 June 2010 (UTC)). **Inter County team apps and scores correct as of (16:31, 30 June 2010 (UTC)).

Betty Sugrue is a former camogie player, captain of the All Ireland Camogie Championship winning team in 1971. She won All Ireland senior medals in Cork's four in a row of 1970–73.
