= Cathy Landers =

Irish former camogie player

Personal information
- Native name: Caitlín de Londras (Irish)
- Born: 1960 (age 65–66) County Cork, Ireland

Sport
- Sport: Camogie
- Position: centre back
Club*
Years	Club	Apps (scores)
	Killeagh	?
Inter-county**
Years	County	Apps (scores)
1975-89	Cork	?
- * club appearances and scores correct as of (16:31, 30 June 2010 (UTC)). **Inter County team apps and scores correct as of (16:31, 30 June 2010 (UTC)).

Catherine ‘Cathy’ Landers is a former camogie player, captain of the All Ireland Camogie Championship winning team in 1983. She won four All Ireland senior medals, three previously in 1978, 1980 and 1982. She played in six further All Ireland finals. Also her son Séamus Harnedy plays with the Cork Senior Hurling Team and has won three Munster medals and three All Star Award

== Career ==
She played her schools camogie with Loreto, Youghal and played on the 1974 junior All Ireland final on the Cork team beaten by Down, winning an All Ireland minor medal and her place on the Cork senior team at the age of 15 in 1975. Her first Cork county medals were with divisional team Imokilly.

She helped Killeagh win their first Cork county title and followed up with an All Ireland Club Championship in 1980, having won her second All Ireland senior medal and first Gael Linn Cup medal within a three-month period. She won National Camogie League medals in 1981 and 1983.
