= Marie Costine =

Irish camogie player

Personal information
- Native name: Máire Ní Coistín (Irish)
- Born: Garryowen, Cloyne, Ireland

Sport
- Sport: Camogie
- Position: full-back
Clubs
- Years: Club
- 1970-1982: Killeagh and Imokilly
Inter-county
- Years: County
- 1970-1978: Cork
Inter-county titles
- All-Irelands: 5
- All Stars: 2004 Team of Century

Marie Costine (born in Cloyne, County Cork, Ireland) is a former camogie player.

== Overview ==
Costine was winner of All Ireland medals in 1970, 1971, 1972, 1973 (as captain) and 1978.

She was selected on the camogie Team of the century in 2004.

== Early life ==
Costine was born in 1947 in Cloyne.

She started playing camogie in 1964 with the Oil Refinery Club. She then joined the Youghal team in 1966 and stayed there until 1971 when Cloyne started their own club.

== Career ==
Costine played club camogie with both Killeagh and Imokilly, winning ten Cork County Championships and an All Ireland Club Championship in 1980, when Killeagh defeated Buffers Alley.

She was the first Cloyne women to bring an All Ireland to Cloyne, which until then was known as the home of Christy Ring. She captained the team in 1973 and contributed significantly to the success of a Cork team that won four championships in a row and added another All Ireland in 1978.

== Awards ==
Costine won the Camogie player of the year in 1973.

== Citation ==
Her Team of the century citation read: "possessing superb ball control, composed and confidant, she revelled in catching and clearing, She was at her best under pressure and made life difficult for forwards through skill and determination. A superb full-back, on her day she could keep any forward at bay."

== Family ==
When she played in the 1973 final, she was on the team with all six of her sisters, Bunnie, Bernie, Kathleen, Rita, Geraldine and Ashlyn.

Her sister Kathleen won three All Ireland medals as goalkeeper for Cork. Her nephew Donal Óg Cusack was a noted Cork hurling goalkeeper.

She married Edmond O'Donovan in 1979 and they have two children.
