= Miriam Higgins Thomas =

American biochemist

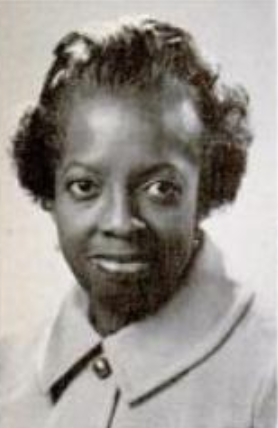
- Miriam Higgins Thomas, from a 1975 publication of the United States federal government
- Born: Miriam Mason Higgins; June 22, 1920; Chicago, Illinois
- Died: September 15, 2002 (aged 82)
- Occupation: Chemist

Miriam Mason Higgins Thomas (June 22, 1920 – September 15, 2002) was an American chemist, based in the United States Army Research and Development Command at Natick, Massachusetts.

== Early life and education ==
Miriam Mason Higgins was born in Chicago, the daughter of William Henry Higgins and Mame Mason Higgins. Her mother was an alumna of the University of Chicago, dean of women at Bethune-Cookman College, and a social service consultant for the Illinois Department of Public Aid. Her brother, William H. Higgins, was a dentist and ordained Methodist minister. Her grandfather, M. C. B. Masons, was a noted orator and Black church leader.

Higgins graduated from Hyde Park High School in 1936, and earned a bachelor's degree in nutrition and chemistry from Bennett College in 1940. She earned a master's degree in food chemistry from the University of Chicago.

== Career ==
Thomas taught at the University of Chicago during World War II, and was a chemist with Food and Container Institute at the Chicago Quartermaster Depot beginning in 1945. She was a research chemist at the U. S. Army Natick Development Center, studying nutritional content of military rations under various conditions. In 1975 she won an Army SARS Fellowship to study food processing and nutrition analysis techniques in Japan, India, the Soviet Union, the Netherlands, and Guatemala. She was a consultant to the Food Research Laboratories, Inc., of Boston, and taught nutrition and food science courses at the Massachusetts Institute of Technology. Her research was published in academic journals including Journal of Microwave Power and Journal of Food Science.

Thomas was nominated three times by the Department of the Army for the Federal Woman's Award. She was a member of the Association of Vitamin Chemists, the Society for Nutrition Education, and the American Association for the Advancement of Science.

== Selected publications and reports ==
- "Use of Ionizing Radiation to Preserve Food" (1988)
- "Effective of Processing and Preparation for Serving on Vitamin Content in T, B, and a Ration Pork" (1986, with Bonita Atwood and K. Ananth Narayan)
- "Stability of Vitamins C, B1, B2 and B6 in Fortified Beef Stew" (1986, with Bonita M. Atwood and K. Ananth Narayan)
- "Thiamin and Riboflavin Content of Flake-cot Formed Pork Roasts" (1982, with R. V. Decareau and Bonita M. Atwood)
- "Effect of Radiation and Conventional Processing on the Thiamin Content of Pork" (1981, with Bonita M. Atwood, E. Wierbicki, and I. A. Taub)
- "Nutritional Aspects of Food Irradiation: An Overview" (1979, with E. S. Josephson and W. K. Calhoun)
- "Radappertization of Meat, Meat Products, and Poultry" (1972, with E. S. Josephson, A. Brynjolfsson, E. Wierbicki, D. B. Rowley, C. Merritt, R. W. Baker, and J. J. Killoran)
- "Effect of Irradiation Dose and Temperature on the Thiamine Content of Ham" (1971, with E. Wierbicki)
- "High-Dose Radiation Processing of Meat, Poultry, and Seafood Products" (1970, with E. Wierbicki, A. Anellis, J. J. Killoran, E. J. Johnson, and Edward S. Josephson)
- "Radiation Preservation of Foods and Its Effect on Nutrients" 1970, with Edward S. Josephson)
- "Effect of Freeze-Thaw Cycling on the Vitamin Content of the Meal Ready-to-Eat, Individual" (1969, with Doris E. Sherman)
- "Modified Microbiological Procedures for Vitamin Assays: A Manual" (1962)
- "The Nutrient Composition of the Meal, Combat, Individual" (1962)
- "Vitamin Retention in Fortified Fruit Tablets During Surgery" (1961)
- "Nutritional evaluation of dehydrated foods and comparison with foods processed by thermal and radiation methods" (1961, with Doris Howes Calloway)
- "Effect of Storage on the Flavor of Chocolate Fortified with Nutritional Yeast" (1957, with A. L. Sheffner and Harry Spector)
- "Effect of Electronic Cooking on Nutritive Value of Foods" (1949, with S. Brenner, A. Eaton, V. Craig)

== Personal life ==
Miriam Higgins married before 1960 and had a son, Brian. Thomas died in 2002, aged 82 years. Her papers are in the National Archives for Black Women's History.
