= Mary O'Leary (camogie) =

Irish camogie player

Mary O’Leary
Personal information
- Native name: Máire Ní Laoire (Irish)
- Born: Cork, Ireland

Sport
- Sport: Camogie
- Position: Centre back
Club*
Years	Club	Apps (scores)
	Youghal	?
Inter-county**
Years	County	Apps (scores)
1978-85	Cork	?
Inter-county titles
- All-Irelands: 4
- * club appearances and scores correct as of (16:31, 30 June 2010 (UTC)). **Inter County team apps and scores correct as of (16:31, 30 June 2010 (UTC)).

Mary O’Leary is a former camogie player, winner of the B+I Star of the Year award in 1982 and All Ireland medals in 1978, 1980, 1982 (when her last-gasp point secured victory for Cork) and 1983.

== Family ==
She is a sister of Cork hurler Seánie O'Leary, a four times All Ireland medalist.

== Free taker ==
As well as her 1982 All Ireland winning point she also pointed a long range free at the end of the 1982 Gael Linn Cup final to win the cup for Munster.

== Awards ==
She was the second winner of the Cospoir/Glen Abbey Hosiery women in sport award in 1982.
