= Claire Cronin (camogie) =

Irish camogie player

Personal information
- Born: Cork, Ireland

Sport
- Sport: Camogie
- Position: Centre field
Club*
Years	Club	Apps (scores)
	St Finbarr’s	?
Inter-county**
Years	County	Apps (scores)
	Cork	?
Inter-county titles
- All-Irelands: 4
- * club appearances and scores correct as of (16:31, 30 June 2010 (UTC)). **Inter County team apps and scores correct as of (16:31, 30 June 2010 (UTC)).

Claire Cronin is a former camogie player, winner of the B+I Star of the Year award and the Gradam Tailte award for skill tests in 1983 having previously won the Levi Youth Sports Star award for Young Player of the Year in 1976. She won All Ireland medals in 1978, 1980, 1982 and 1983.

== Career ==
In 1976 she helped St Aloysius school bring the All Ireland colleges championship to Cork for the first time, and won All Ireland minor medals with Cork in 1976 and 1977. She won the first of her four All Ireland senior medals in 1978, and captained the team in 1981 when Cork lost to Kilkenny in the All Ireland senior final.
