= Pat Moloney =

Irish camogie player

Personal information
- Native name: Padraigín Ní Mhaoldomhnaigh (Irish)
- Born: Killeagh, Ireland

Sport
- Sport: Camogie
- Position: corner-forward
Club
- Years: Club
- 1970-1982: Killeagh
Inter-county
- Years: County
- 1970-1982: Cork
Inter-county titles
- All-Irelands: 7
- All Stars: 2004 Team of Century

Pat Moloney-Lenihan is a former camogie player selected on the camogie team of the century in 2004, and winner of All Ireland medals in 1970, 1971, 1972, 1973, 1978, 1980 and 1982.

== Club and collegiate career ==
She was educated at Presentation Convent, Youghal. As a young player she was commended for continuing to play with her native village despite their status as a junior club, eventually helping Killeagh club win six Cork Championships and one All Ireland Club Championship. While a student in UCC she won four successive Ashbourne Cup inter-collegiate medals and played with the Combined Universities.

== Inter-county career ==
She was still a teenager when she won her first All Ireland medal in the first leg of what became a four in a row for Cork, 1970–1973 and went on to collect three more senior All Ireland medals. She led Cork to All Ireland victory in 1982 and won her seventh All Ireland medal despite being forced to retire with a leg injury.

== Awards ==
Apart from her selection on the camogie team of the century in 2004, she won the B&1 “Player of the Year” award in 1978 and the Jury’s Hotel Award in 1982.

== Citation ==
Her team of the century citation read: "an intelligent, confident and versatile player who played right hand below left she had skill, speed and style. She was difficult to mark, as she was usually a move ahead of the opposition. Her incisive runs stretched the defence. She played at midfield before moving to the attack where she proved to be a natural and outstanding forward."
