= 2011 Ashbourne Cup =

Ashbourne Cup 2011
Tournament details
- Date: Dec 2010 – 20 Feb 2011
- Teams: 10

Winners
- Champions: Waterford IT (5th title)
- Manager: Helena Jacob
- Captain: Ann Dalton

Runners-up
- Runners-up: University College Cork
- Manager: Ray Delaney
- Captain: Grainne Kenneally

Other
- Matches played: 9

The 2011 Ashbourne Cup inter-collegiate camogie championship was staged at the NUIG sports complex in Dangan, Galway, over the weekend of February 19–20 with the finals in Pearse Stadium, Salthill. It was won by Waterford Institute of Technology who defeated University College Cork in the final by eight points, a repeat of the pairing and result, though not the margin of victory, of the 1999 final and 2010 final. Player of the tournament was WIT's Katrina Parrock.

== The Final ==
A dominant WIT team did all the hard work in the first half and raced into a 1–6 to 0–1 lead at the break. The first score of the game came from a long Katrina Parrock delivery which deceived UCC keeper, Susan Earner, to find its way to the UCC net. UCC had no answer to WITs phenomenal work rate and support play. The main difference between the two teams was WIT ability to take scores from play while all of UCC's scores came from placed balls. UCC were dealt a major blow when they lost key player Orla Cotter through injury ten minutes after the break. Two well taken goals from the stick of Fionnuala Carr brought UCC back to life but proved too little too late, and a late goal from Michelle Quilty ensured victory for WIT.

== Arrangements ==
The competition is administered by the Higher Education committee of the Camogie Association of Ireland. For the second time the Ashbourne Cup, the highest division in collegiate camogie, was played alongside the Purcell Cup, the second division of collegiate competition, bringing 400 collegiate camogie players had been together at one event for the second time in camogie history. Galway City Council held a reception for the 16 Ashbourne and Purcell Captains before the event.

== Participants ==
Waterford IT and UCC emerged as the favourites for the competition from an early stage. The two finalists had several inter-county and All Star players in action.

=== Results ===
February 9
Quarter-Final

| University College Dublin | 9-22 – 0-1 | Athlone IT |

University College Dublin

February 10
Quarter-Final

| University of Limerick | 5-17 – 1-5 | UU Jordanstown |

Ballykelly

February 10
Quarter-Final

| University College Cork | 2-16 – 0-4 | Cork IT |

Mardyke, Cork

February 10
Quarter-Final

| Waterford IT | 3-8 – 0-9 | NUI Galway |

NUI Galway

February 20
Semi-Final

| University College Cork | 0-12 – 0-3 | University College Dublin |

NUI Galway

February 20
Semi-Final

| Waterford IT | 4-9– 0-6 | University of Limerick |

NUI Galway

2011-02-20
Final
15:00 BST

| Waterford IT | 2-10 – 2-2 | University College Cork |
|---|---|---|
| K Parrock 1-1, D Gaulle, K Kelly 0-2 each, F Morrissey, K Power 0-1 each, P Jackman 0-1). | Camogie.ie | F Carr 2-0f, O Cotter 0-2f. |

Pearse Stadium
Attendance: 1,200
Referee: Fintan McNamara (Clare)

| Waterford IT | University College Cork |

WIT:
| GK | 1 | Cristina Kenneally (Tipperary) |
| RCB | 2 | Collette Dormer (Kilkenny) |
| FB | 3 | Sarah Ann Fitzgerald (Laois) |
| LCB | 4 | Kay Ryall (Kilkenny) |
| RWB | 5 | Stacey Redmond ((Wexford) |
| CB | 6 | Ann Dalton (Kilkenny) |
| LWB | 7 | Patricia Jackman (Waterford) (0-1) |
| MF | 8 | Jean Brady (Offaly) |
| MF | 9 | Lorraine Keen (Offaly) |
| RWF | 10 | Michelle Quilty (Kilkenny) (1-2) |
| CF | 11 | Katie Power (Kilkenny) (0-1) |
| LWF | 12 | Fiona Morrissey (Limerick) (0-1) |
| RCF | 13 | Katrina Parrock (Wexford) (1-1) |
| FF | 14 | Denise Gaule (Kilkenny) (0-2) |
| LCF | 15 | Karen Kelly (Waterford) (0-2) |

UCC:
| GK | 1 | Susan Earner (Galway) |
| RCB | 2 | Julie Brien (Galway) |
| FB | 3 | Sarah Collins (Limerick) |
| LCB | 4 | Elaine O'Shea (Kilkenny) |
| RWB | 5 | Pamela Mackey (Cork) |
| CB | 6 | Fionnuala Carr (Down) 2-0 |
| LWB | 7 | Adeen MacNamara (Limerick) |
| MF | 8 | Orla Cotter (Cork) 0-2 |
| MF | 9 | Miriam Crowley (Cork) |
| RWF | 10 | 5haron Hayes (Galway) |
| CF | 11 | Denise Cronin (Cork) (0-4) |
| LWF | 12 | Grainne Kenneally (Waterford) |
| RCF | 13 | Cliodhna McSweeney (Kildare) |
| FF | 14 | Niamh Goulding (Cork) |
| LCF | 15 | Katriona Mackey (Cork) |

MATCH RULES

- 60 minutes
- Extra Time if scores level
- Maximum of 5 substitutions

== Ashbourne All-Stars ==
The 2011 Ashbourne All-Stars selected after the tournament were:

Susan Earner (UCC & Galway); Collette Dormer (WIT & Kilkenny), Leann Fennelly (UCD & Kilkenny), Julia Brien (UCC & Galway); Ann Dalton (WIT & Kilkenny), Michaela Morgan (NUIG & Offaly), Patricia Jackman (WIT & Waterford); Katrina Parrock (WIT & Wexford), Chloe Morey (NUIG & Clare); Michaela Convery (Jordanstown & Antrim), Katie Power (WIT & Kilkenny), Lisa Bolger (UL & Offaly); Katriona Mackey (UCC & Cork), Denise Gaule (WIT) & Kilkenny), Michelle Quilty (WIT & Kilkenny);

== Purcell All-Stars ==
The 2011 Purcell All-Stars selected after the competition were: Laura Quinn (QUB & Derry); Grainne Quinn (DIT & Dublin), Kate Lynch (Mary I Limerick & Clare), Laura Twomey (DCU & Dublin); Mairead Short (QUB & Armagh), Caitriona Foley (Trinity & Cork), Emma Brennan (DCU & Cork); Jane Dolan (DIT) & Meath), Keelan Bradley (QUB & Derry); Cathy Bowes (DIT & Galway), Colette McSorley (QUB & Armagh), Aoife Burke (DIT & Laois); Sinead Cassidy] (QUB & Derry), Orlaith Murphy (IT Tralee & Cork), Hoarqy (DIT & Dublin);

== Ashbourne Shield ==
The Ashbourne Shield, played off among the four beaten Ashbourne Cup quarter-finalists, was won by NUI Galway who defeated Cork IT 4–18 to 0–3 in the final. In the semi-finals Cork IT (3-18) defeated Athlone IT (3-3) and NUI Galway (1-7) defeated UUJ 0–9.

== Purcell Cup ==
Queen's University won the Purcell Cup defeating DCU 2–10 to 0–7 in the final. Keelin Bradley inspired the Ulster team to victory. In the semi-finals Queen's University (2-7) defeated IT Tralee (3-1) and DCU (2-6) defeated Mary I Limerick (0-4). The tie of the quarter-finals was the victory of Queen's University (4-12) over cup holders DIT (3-5) in the grounds of Dundalk IT. IT Tralee (1-7) defeated IT Carlow 0–7, Mary I Limerick defeated Galway-Mayo Institute of Technology and DCU (5-14) defeated Dublin University (0-1) in the other quarter-finals.

== Purcell Shield ==
DIT won the Purcell Shield defeating Trinity College, Dublin by 5–11 to 0–7 in the final. In the Purcell Shield semi-finals, played off among the four defeated Purcell Cup quarter-finalists, DIT (5-15) defeated IT Carlow (2-5) and Trinity (10-14) defeated GMIT (2-3).

== Qualifiers ==
In the Ashbourne/Purcell qualifiers NUI Galway (2-19) defeated DIT (2-6) at Dangan, Galway. Athlone IT (2-11) defeated IT Tralee (0-3) at Ahane, County Limerick.

== League ==
UCC (3-10) beat UU Jordanstown (0-1) at Éire Óg, Caragh, Co Kildare to win the third level league final.

== Fr Meachair Cup ==
Colleges who do not compete in the Ashbourne and Purcell Cups participate in a one-day seven-a-side competition for a cup named after Fr Gearóid Ó Meachair (Gerry Meagher, d1982), from Cappawhite, Co Tipperary, founder and popular trainer of the NUI Maynooth camogie team. It was inaugurated in 1986. Cavan Institute, Coláiste Froebel, Crumlin College of Further Ed, Dundalk IT, Letterkenny IT, Limerick IT, Marino, NUI Maynooth, St Mary's, St Pats, Sligo IT and University of Ulster Coleraine, all competed in the 2011 competition, which was won by NUI Maynooth.

| Preceded by 2010 Ashbourne Cup | Ashbourne Cup; 1915 – present | Succeeded by 2012 Ashbourne Cup |
