= 2010 Ashbourne Cup =

Inter-collegiate camogie championship

Ashbourne Cup 2010
Tournament details
- Date: Jan 2010 – 21 Feb
- Teams: 8

Winners
- Champions: Waterford IT (4th title)
- Manager: Helena Jacob
- Captain: Ursula Jacob

Runners-up
- Runners-up: University College Cork
- Manager: Aoife Murray
- Captain: Grainne Kenneally

Other
- Matches played: 7

The 2010 Ashbourne Cup inter-collegiate camogie championship was staged at the Cork IT sports complex in Bishopstown, Cork, Munster province, Ireland over the weekend of 20–21 February. It was won by Waterford Institute of Technology who defeated University College Cork in the final by two points, a repeat of the pairing and result, though not the margin of victory, of the 1999 final. Player of the tournament was WIT's Katrina Parrock.

== The final ==
Waterford led 0-3 to 0-2 at half-time and extended their lead before Denise Cronin's 37th-minute goal for UCC, dispossessing Redmond and soloing from halfway and unleashing a shot from just outside the 20m line. WIT saw their lead cut back to a point immediately afterwards but regained the initiative and goalkeeper Cristina Kenneally's late save from Jill Horan secured their victory.

== Arrangements ==
For the first time the Ashbourne Cup, the highest division in collegiate camogie, was played alongside the Purcell Cup, the second division of collegiate competition, bringing 400 collegiate camogie players had been together at one event for the first time in camogie history. Cork City Council held a reception for the 16 Ashbourne and Purcell Captains before the event on 19 February 2010.

== Participants ==
Waterford IT and UCC emerged as the favourites for the competition from an early stage, although University College Dublin ran UCC to one point in the Ashbourne semi-final. The two finalists had several inter-county players among the entrants, from Kilkenny and Cork respectively, including Ann Dalton captain of the Kilkenny team, All Star Katie Power (Kilkenny) and Orla Cotter from the Cork team had played in the 2009 All Ireland final the previous September. The competition was administered by the Higher Education committee of the Camogie Association of Ireland.

=== Results ===
6 February
Quarter-final

Waterford IT	4-18 – 0-6	Cork IT

Cork IT

3 February
Quarter-final

UU Jordanstown	3-19 – 0-3	Athlone IT

Athlone IT

6 February
Quarter-final

University College Cork	0-11 – 0-9	University of Limerick

Mardyke, Cork

6 February
Quarter-final

University College Dublin	5-12 – 1-8	NUI Galway

Belfield, University College Dublin

20 February
Semi-final

University College Cork	0-10 – 0-9	University College Dublin

Cork IT

20 February
Semi-final

Waterford IT	2-10 – 0-3	UU Jordanstown

Cork IT

21 February
Final
15:00 BST

Waterford IT	0-11 – 1-6	University College Cork
U Jacob 0-5, K Parrock 0-2, M O'Neill 0-2, K Kelly 0-1, C Raher 0-1.	Camogie.ie	D Cronin 1-1; O Cotter 0-4, J Horan 0-1.

Cork IT
Attendance: 1,000
Referee: John Morrissey (Tipperary)

Waterford IT	University College Cork

WIT:
GK	1	Cristina Kenneally (Tipperary)
RCB	2	Theresa Shortt (Tipperary)
FB	3	Sara Anne Fitzgerald (Laois)
LCB	4	Kellyanne Cottrell (Kilkenny)
RWB	5	Collette Dormer (Kilkenny)
CB	6	Ann Dalton (Kilkenny)
LWB	7	Stacey Redmond (Wexford)
MF	8	Denise Gaule (Kilkenny)
MF	9	Patricia Jackman (Waterford)
RWF	10	Katie Power (Kilkenny)
CF	11	Marie O'Neill (Cork) (0-2)
LWF	12	Katrina Parrock (Wexford) (0-2)
RCF	13	Karen Kelly (Waterford) (0-1)
FF	14	Ursula Jacob (Wexford) (Captain) (0-5) (substituted off) 37'
LCF	15	Michelle Quilty (Kilkenny)
Substitutes:
LCF		Charlene Raher (Waterford) (0-1) (substituted on) 37'

UCC:
GK	1	Denise Leahy (Cork)
RCB	2	Julie Brien (Galway)
FB	3	Sarah Collins (Limerick)
LCB	4	Elaine O'Shea (Kilkenny)
RWB	5	Adeen McNamara (Limerick)
CB	6	Fionnuala Carr (Down)
LWB	7	Miriam Crowley (Cork)
MF	8	Jill Horan (Tipperary) (0-1)
MF	9	Denise Cronin (Cork) (1-1)
RWF	10	Grainne Kenneally (Waterford) (Captain)
CF	11	Orla Cotter (Cork) (0-4)
LWF	12	Therese Muldowney (Kilkenny)
RCF	13	Deidre Fahey (Waterford)
FF	14	Siobhan McGrath (Tipperary)
LCF	15	Aoife McLoughney (Tipperary)

MATCH RULES

- 60 minutes
- Extra Time if scores level
- Maximum of 5 substitutions

== Ashbourne All-Stars ==
The 2010 Ashbourne All-Stars selected after the tournament were:

Eleanor Mallon (Jordanstown); Mairéad Luttrelle (UCD), Sabrina Larkin (UL), Gráinne Stapleton (UCD); Collette Dormer (WIT), Fionnuala Carr (UCC), Jill Horan (UCC); Katrina Parrock (WIT), Alison Maguire (UCD); Gráinne Kenneally (UCC), Áine Lyng (UL), Patricia Jackman (WIT); Fiona Lafferty (UL), Ursula Jacob (WIT), Deirdre Twomey (NUIG).

== Purcell All-Stars ==
The 2010 Purcell All-Stars selected after the competition were:

Martina O'Brien (IT Tralee); Karen Mullins (DIT), Therese Lynn (Maynooth), Sarah Ryan (DIT); Rachel Ruddy (Trinity), Edwina Keane (IT Tralee), Ellen O'Loughlin (DIT); Jane Dolan (DIT), Paula Kenny (Garda College); Christina Kenny (DCU), Keelin Bradley (Queen's), Niamh Mulcahy (Mary I); Shauna Jordan (Queen's), Colette McSorley (Queen's), Louise Walsh (Maynooth)

== Ashbourne Shield ==
The Ashbourne Shield, played off among the four beaten Ashbourne Cup quarter-finalists, was won by the University of Limerick who defeated Cork IT 1-10 to 1-4 in the final. In the semi-finals Cork IT (8-19) defeated Athlone IT (1-8) and UL (6-9) defeated NUI Galway (0-7).

=== Ashbourne Shield Panels ===
UL: Susan Vaughan, Edel Frisby, Sabrina Larkin, Alison Walsh, Karen Duggan, Mary Ryan, Clare Ryan, Clodagh Glynn, Shonagh Curran, Fiona Rochford, Mary Coleman, Áine Lyng (Captain) (1-5), Ciara Johnston (0-1), Mairead Scanlon, Darina Ryan (0-1), Anne Marie McGann, Siobhan O'Neill, Roisin Byrne, Fiona Lafferty (0-2), Juanita Brennan, Maria Walsh, Elaine Hough (0-1), Maria Moran, Ursula Quinn, Aine Brislane

Cork IT Lisa Marie O'Mahoney (Cork), Patricia Moloney (Cork), Christine O'Neill (Cork), Aisling O'Keefe (Cork), Colleen Long (Cork), Julie McGrath (Cork), Charlotte Kearney (Captain), Elaine O'Riordan (Cork), Erin Reidy (Cork), Shona Cunningham (Cork), Ursula Day (Cork), Evelyn Ronayne (Cork), Erin Corkery (Cork), Denise Luby (Cork) (0-3), Michelle Browne (Cork) (1-1) Anne-Marie Ryan, Ciara McKenna, Suzanne Lynch, Clara Kavanagh, Emma O'Reagan, Mairead O'Sullivan, Aoife Doyle, Orla Gleeson, Sorcha Fenneily, Aoife Doyle, Anne-Marie Ryan, Ciara McKenna, Suzanne Lynch, Clara Kavanagh, Emma O'Reagan, Mairead O'Sullivan, Aoife Doyle, Orla Gleeson, Sorcha Fenneily, Aoife Doyle

== Purcell Cup ==
Dublin Institute of Technology, beaten finalists by a point in 2008, won the Purcell Cup defeating IT Tralee 1-5 to 0-5 in the final. An early goal from Noelle Corrigan proved to be the difference between the teams. The Purcell Cup quarter-finals threw up an upset when Mary Immaculate defeated Queen's University Belfast 1-7 to 0-2. In the semi-finals IT Tralee defeated Garda College 2-10 to 0-2 and Dublin IT defeated Mary Immaculate 3-7 to 2-9.

=== Purcell Cup Teams ===
Dublin Institute of Technology: Nicola Byrnes (Dublin); Deirdre Barry (Westmeath), Gráinne Quinn (Dublin), Sarah Walsh (Kilkenny); Karen Mullins (Tipperary), Sarah Ryan (Dublin), Norah Kirby (Dublin); Jane Dolan (Meath) (0-3f), Aileen O'Loughlin (Laois); Cathy Bowes (Galway) (0-1), Coral Ann Canning (Dublin), Eimear Brunell (Dublin); Kathryn Katounia (Dublin), Noelle Corrigan (Kilkenny) (1-0), Joleene Hoary (Dublin) (0-1). Sub: Aisling Brogan (Dublin) for Brunell (22, inj).

IT Tralee: Martina O'Brien (Cork); Alva Neary (Limerick), Tara Cooney (Galway), Maura O'Brien (Cork); Áine Byrne (Tipperary), Edwina Keane (Kilkenny), Jill Hurley (Cork); Sarah Sexton (Cork), Megan Moran (Galway); Grace O'Riordan (Limerick), Geraldine Norton (Wicklow), Orlaith Murphy (Cork) 0-4, three frees one 45); Danielle Sheedy (Clare) (0-1), Ailish Considine (Clare), Mairéad Fitzgerald (Limerick).

== Purcell Shield ==
Queen's University Belfast won the Purcell Shield defeating NUI Maynooth by 1-8 to 0-8 in the final. In the Purcell Shield semi-finals, played off among the four defeated Purcell Cup quarter-finalists, Maynooth defeated DCU 0-13 to 1-5 and QUB defeated Trinity 4-9 to 1-3.

=== Purcell Shield Panels ===
Queen's: Laura Quinn, Sarah Louise Henry, Anne McGuigan, Adelle Archibald, Theresa Adams, Kerry Crossey, Maire McGeehan, Claire Laverty, Mairead Short, Claire Dallat (0-1), Keelin Bradley (1-0), Shauna Jordan (Captain) (0-1), Louise McAleese, Collette McSorley (0-6), Ciara Donnelly. Subs Leona Quinn, Breanainn Mullan, Maeve Boyle, Janine McNeill, Brenda Toner, Ciara O'Kane, Eimear Murphy, Kathleen Kielt, Orla O'Neill, Sinead Cassidy

Maynooth: Jane Power (Meath), Jackie Doyle (Wexford), Therese Lynn (Kildare), Laura Hogan (Wicklow), Jenna Murphy (Meath), Sarah King (Westmeath), Aisling Newton (Donegal), Annie Kirwin (Dublin), Siobhan Mac Court (Kildare), Aoife Kavanagh (Dublin), Catherine Walsh (Kilkenny) (0-1), Martha Kirwin (Laois) (Captain), Sabine Kennedy (Kildare), Sinead McHugh (Kildare), Maria Divilly (Kildare). Subs Louise Walsh (Kildare) (0-7), Niamh Lyons (Kildare), Sarah Nealon (Kildare), Mariona Tyrell (Kilkenny), Mags Shorthall, Aimee Singleton (Dublin), Emma Carroll (Kilkenny), Ailbhe Rogers (Louth), Laura Newman (Westmeath), Edel Ni Dhunaigh (Dublin)

== Fr Meachair Cup ==
The 2010 Fr Meachair Cup seven-a-side for colleges who do not compete in the Ashbourne or Purcell Cups was hosted by Marino College at the Nearby St Vincent's GAA Grounds on February 25, 2010 and won by St Mary's Belfast. Group Results: Group A: Marino 4-4 Carlow IT 1-7; Carlow IT 5-2 Froebel 3-2; Marino 1-2 Froebel 0-5; Group B: Dundalk IT 1-4 Crumlin 1-1; St Mary’s Belfast 3-4 Dundalk IT 0-2; St Mary’s Belfast 3-5; Crumlin 3-3; St Mary’s, Belfast 10-4 Coleraine 0-0; Crumlin 2-4 Coleraine 1-1; Dundalk IT 3-3 Coleraine 1-1; Fr Meachair Cup Semi-finals: Dundalk IT 2-4 Marino 2-2; St Mary’s, Belfast 2-6 Carlow IT 0-0; Fr Meachair Cup Final: St Mary’s, Belfast 1-8 Dundalk IT 1-4 (AET); Shield Final; Froebel 4-4 Coleraine 1-0,

Preceded by 2009 Ashbourne Cup	Ashbourne Cup; 1915 – present	Succeeded by 2011 Ashbourne Cup
