= Ashbourne Cup =

Tournament

- Current season or competition: 2026 Ashbourne Cup
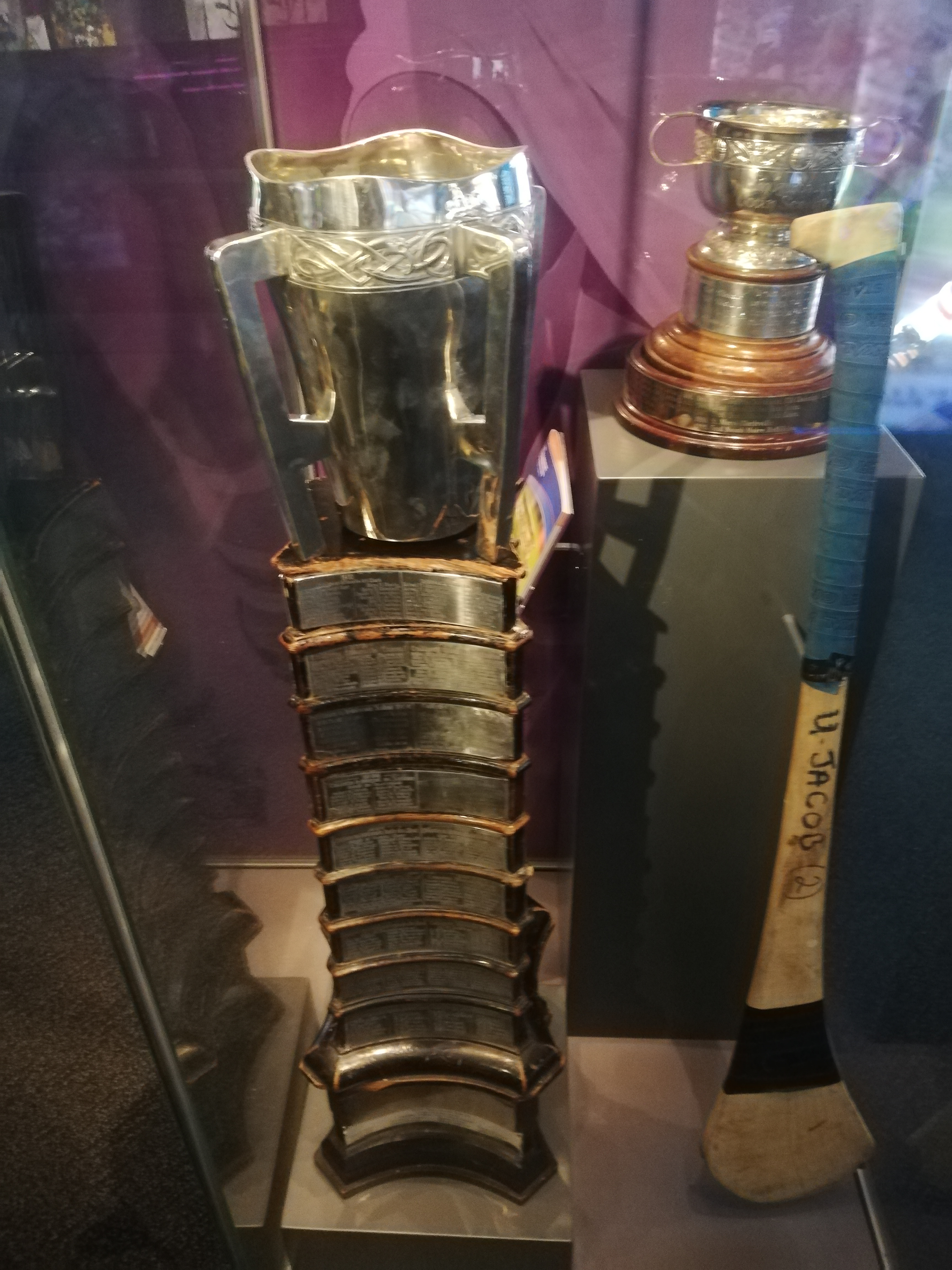
- Ashbourne Cup displayed in the GAA Museum
- Irish: Corn Ashbourne
- Founded: 1915
- Trophy: Ashbourne Cup see 2nd Baron Ashbourne
- Title holders: University of Limerick (11th title)
- Most titles: University College Dublin (35 titles)

The Ashbourne Cup is an Irish camogie tournament played each year to determine the national champion university or third level college. The Ashbourne Cup is the highest division in inter-collegiate camogie. The competition features many of the current stars of the game and is sometimes known as the 'Olympics of Camogie' because of the disproportionate number of All Star and All-Ireland elite level players who participate each year Since 1972 it has been administered by the Higher Education committee of the Camogie Association. University College Cork are the current champions, having won the Ashbourne cup in 2026.

== Format ==
Each of the 4 @3rdLevelCamogie competitions follow a group stage and knockout format. Teams are generally divided into 2 groups with the top 2 in each group advancing to the semi-finals and 3rd place in both groups contesting the shield final. Each competition operates on a promotion and relegation basis.

== History ==
The competition is the brainchild of Agnes O'Farrelly (1874–1951), founder member (1914) and president (1914–51) of the UCD camogie club who later served as president of the Camogie Association of Ireland in 1941–2. In 1915 she persuaded her friend, Irish language activist William Gibson, aka Liam Mac Giolla Bhríde (1868–1942), second Lord Ashbourne, to donate a trophy for the camogie intervarsity competition. The first game of intercollegiate camogie took place between University College Dublin and University College Cork on 18 April 1915. NUI Galway (then University College, Galway) joined the competition in 1916, Queen's University Belfast in 1934, and NUI Maynooth (then St Patrick's College), New University of Ulster, Coleraine, and Trinity College, Dublin in 1972. Apart from 1934 to 1937, until 1960 the competition was played on a league basis, and since then the concluding stages have been played together on a single weekend in mid-February. There was no competition in 1943, due to war-time restrictions, and the competition remained unfinished in 1963, when University College Dublin fielded an ineligible player for the final, which was drawn and never replayed. University College Cork claimed the title. The Ashbourne Cup semi finals and finals are now played alongside the Purcell (2nd Division), Fr. Meachair (3rd Division) and Uí Mhaolagáin Cups (4th Division) on the second weekend of February.

== Purcell Cup ==
The CCAO also oversees the Purcell Cup (Division 2), which has been contested since 1977. The Purcell Cup, was donated by Úna Uí Phuirséil, President of the Camogie Association 1976–78, and her husband Pádraig Puirséil, Gaelic games correspondent for The Irish Press 1954–78. Mary Immaculate College, Limerick defeated Ulster Polytechnic by 3–0 to 0–1 in the first final in St Patrick's. Drumcondra on 6 March 1977.

== Fr Meachair Cup ==
Colleges who do not compete in the Ashbourne and Purcell Cups play for a cup named after Fr Gearóid Ó Meachair (Gerry Meagher, d1982), from Cappawhite, Co Tipperary, founder and popular trainer of the NUI Maynooth camogie team. Inaugurated in 1986, the Fr. Meachair Cup is now competed by both college senior and intermediate teams.

== O'Mhaolagáin Cup ==
The remaining teams not in the first three championships participate in the 4th division or Uí Mhaolagáin cup, with the format following the group and knockout stages implemented in the other competitions. The trophy is named for Camogie Association President of 1991–4, Brídín Uí Mhaolagáin.

== Ashbourne Cup Winners ==
Team	County	Wins	Last win
University College Dublin (UCD)	Dublin	35	2008
University College Cork (UCC)	Cork	33	2026
National University of Ireland, Galway (NUIG, formerly UCG)	Galway	15	1994
University of Limerick (UL)	Limerick	11	2024
Waterford Institute of Technology (WIT)	Waterford	8	2016
University of Ulster, Jordanstown (UUJ)	Antrim	3	1997
TU Dublin (TUD GAA)	Dublin	1	2023
Queen's University Belfast (QUB GAA)	Antrim	1	1991
Dublin City University (DCU DÉ)	Dublin	1	2022

== Highlights & Incidents ==
Highlights and incidents of the championship history include:

- The 1918 competition played before record crowds of up to 4,000 for each of three matches in Terenure over the weekend of Feb 16–18, Dublin beating Cork on Friday, Galway and Cork drawing one goal each on Saturday and Dublin beating Galway 2–0 to 1–1 on Sunday to secure the trophy when Nora Cleary's goal from a 60-yard shot proving the highlight of the weekend, Margaret McGrane scoring Dublin's second goal
- Harry Diamond, member of Northern Ireland Parliament, refereed the 1935 final, the first to be hosted by Queen's University
- Some members of the UCG winning 1917 team refused to have their names engraved on the cup in the Irish language, something that brought their future selection into doubt.
- The Galway, Antrim and Dublin county boards suspended UCG, Queen's and UCD for six months for taking part in the 1949 Ashbourne Cup as they had refused instructions not to play against UCC, affiliated to the Cork board which was disaffiliated from camogie's central body for the term of a complex eight-year split in the Association.
- The inconclusive 1961 final when the Ashbourne Cup committee decided one of the UCD players was ineligible. The match was drawn 2-1 each and never replayed, with UCC claiming victory.
- The 1962 competition when snow was cleared from the field, the semi-finals played on the following day and the final completed a fortnight later when Anne Duane's late goal gave Dublin a late victory in one of the best Ashbourne cup ties of the 12-a-side era.
- Galway's breakthrough in 1965 powered by goalkeeper Eileen Naughton who held Queen's scoreless in the semi-final and Dublin could manage just one point in the final,
- The 1966 semi-final in which Dublin beat Queen's by an astonishing 17–6 to nil, as Ann Carroll inspired Dublin to victory in her first appearance in a competition where she was to become the outstanding personality over a five-year period.
- The 1969 semi-finals played in four inches of snow on the Malone Road sports fields in Belfast. The final was eventually played in Athlone when Dublin won with the help of three goals from Joan Traynor.
- In 1972 Trinity College, NUI Maynooth and the University of Ulster, Coleraine brought the number of teams competing in the Ashbourne Cup to seven
- Margery Doohan's performance in the 1970 final, her five goals won her Irish Press sports personality of the week in a year when UCD won without their injured captain Ann Carroll
- Cork's six in a row 1972–77 with players like Val O'Dwyer and Aideen McCarthy and three goal hero of 1977 Noreen McCarthy, their toughest contest in the period may have been the 1976 quarter-final 2–6 to 3–2 victory over Maynooth, one of the best matches in the 12-a-side era of Ashbourne history, in which Angela Downey scored 2-2. Maynooth came closest to winning the Fitzgibbon when it could draw on the services of the iconic Angela Downey between 1975 and 1979, appearing in two finals.
- The 1974 first round match between UCG and Queen's played in perhaps the worst conditions ever for a camogie match - the ball became lodged in a mud pool for a considerable period
- Dublin's nine victories in eleven years in the 1980s, launched by Edel Murphy's scores in a closely fought final against UCC in 1980 and spearheaded by players such as Germaine Noonan, Marie Connell and Breda Kenny in subsequent years.
- Cork's eight goals in arctic conditions at Santry in 1985, decisively defeating UCD with great displays by Claire Cronin, Patsy Kenelry and three goal hero Norma Delaney.
- The emergence of Queen's in 1991 led by Deirdre O'Doherty, Joan Tobin and Mary Black followed closely by Jordanstown in 1992 marking the high point of Colleges camogie in Ulster, followed by Limerick's victory over Waterford in an all-newcomers final in 1995 when Sinéad Millea's prolific scoring gave Limerick victory.
- Limerick's breakthrough in 1995 which led to six titles in 11 years including a treble in 2004-6
- The first 15-a-side final of a major camogie competition in 1999 when Waterford celebrated their first success and the first non-University success thanks to Mary Walshe's 39th minute winning goal.
- Waterford's 2009-13 five in a row, powered by All Ireland stars from Cork and Wexford and Kilkenny, who supplied five of their forwards on the 2012 team
- The 2023 competition saw the University of Limerick knocked out of the competition, despite beating Maynooth University by 34 points on score difference. They received an email from the THDC stating their elimination 72 hours before the semi finals were due to take place.

== Ashbourne Cup Champion Colleges ==
- 1915 UCD
- 1916 UCD
- 1917 NUIG
- 1918 UCD
- 1919 UCC
- 1920 NUIG
- 1921 UCD
- 1922 UCC
- 1923 UCC
- 1924 UCC
- 1925 UCC
- 1926 UCC
- 1927 UCC
- 1928 NUIG
- 1929 UCC
- 1930 NUIG
- 1931 UCC
- 1932 UCC
- 1933 UCD
- 1934 UCC
- 1935 UCD
- 1936 UCC
- 1937 UCC
- 1938 UCD
- 1939 UCD
- 1940 UCD
- 1941 UCD
- 1942 UCD
- 1943 Not Played
- 1944 UCC
- 1945 UCC
- 1946 UCD
- 1947 UCC
- 1948 NUIG
- 1949 NUIG
- 1950 UCD
- 1951 UCC
- 1952 UCD
- 1953 UCD
- 1954 UCD
- 1955 UCD
- 1956 NUIG
- 1957 NUIG
- 1958 UCD
- 1959 UCD
- 1960 UCD
- 1961 UCD
- 1962 UCD
- 1963 UCC
- 1964 NUIG
- 1965 UCC
- 1966 UCD
- 1967 UCC
- 1968 NUIG
- 1969 UCD
- 1970 UCD
- 1971 UCD
- 1972 UCC
- 1973 UCC
- 1974 UCC
- 1975 UCC
- 1976 UCC
- 1977 UCC
- 1978 NUIG
- 1979 NUIG
- 1980 UCD
- 1981 UCD
- 1982 UCD
- 1983 UCD
- 1984 UCD
- 1985 UCC
- 1986 UCD
- 1987 UCD
- 1988 UCD
- 1989 NUIG
- 1990 NUIG
- 1991 QUB
- 1992 UUJ
- 1993 UUJ
- 1994 NUIG
- 1995 UL
- 1996 UCC
- 1997 UUJ
- 1998 UCC
- 1999 WIT
- 2000 UCC
- 2001 WIT
- 2002 UCC
- 2003 UCC
- 2004 UL
- 2005 UL
- 2006 UL
- 2007 UCD
- 2008 UCD
- 2009 WIT
- 2010 WIT
- 2011 WIT.
- 2012 WIT
- 2013 WIT
- 2014 UL
- 2015 WIT
- 2016 UL
- 2017 UL
- 2018 UL
- 2019 UL
- 2020 UL
- 2021 Not played
- 2022 DCU
- 2023 TUD
- 2024 UL

== Purcell Cup Champion Colleges ==
- 1977 Mary I
- 1978 Mary I
- 1979 Ulster Poly
- 1980 Thomond
- 1981 Thomond
- 1982 St Mary's, Belfast
- 1983 Mary I
- 1984 Ulster Poly
- 1986 Thomond
- 1987 Thomond
- 1988 Thomond
- 1989 Mary I
- 1990 Waterford RTC
- 1991 Thomond
- 1992 Waterford RTC
- 1993 Athlone RTC
- 1994 UCC
- 1995 Athlone RTC
- 1996 Maynooth
- 1997 Queen's Belfast
- 1998 Mary I
- 1999 Limerick IT
- 2000 UUJ
- 2001 Cork Institute of Technology (CIT)
- 2002 Carlow
- 2003 UUJ
- 2004 Athlone IT
- 2005 Garda College
- 2006 UUJ
- 2007 Athlone IT
- 2008 Queen's Belfast
- 2009 Athlone IT
- 2010 DIT
- 2011 Queen's Belfast
- 2012 DCU
- 2013 DCU
- 2014 UCC
- 2015 Mary I
- 2016 Cork IT
- 2017 DIT
- 2018 NUIG
- 2019 Maynooth University
- 2020 UCD
- 2021 Not Played
- 2022 TU Dublin (formerly DIT)
- 2023 MTU Cork
- 2024 University of Galway
- 2025 Mary I
- 2026 UL

== Fr Meachair Cup Champion Colleges ==
- 2012 Mary Immaculate College, Limerick
- 2013 St Patrick's College Drumcondra
- 2014 IT Carlow
- 2015 IT Carlow
- 2016 Trinity College Dublin
- 2017 St Patrick's College Drumcondra
- 2018
- 2019 Athlone IT
- 2020 Trinity College Dublin
- 2021 Not Played
- 2022 UCC
- 2023
- 2024
- 2025
- 2026 University of Galway

== Ashbourne Cup Finals ==
Until 1960 the series was played as a round robin over different weekends in the winter. The first figure in this table is the number of goals scored (equal to 3 points each) and the second total is the number of points scored, the figures are combined to determine the winner of a match in Gaelic Games. The results, dates and venues of finals since 1960 have been:

- 1960 Feb 28 UC Dublin 4-03 UC Galway 1-01 Galway
- 1961 Feb 11 UC Dublin 5-00 Queen's Belfast 0-00 Cherryvale
- 1962 Mar 4 UC Dublin 6-01 UC Cork 5-01 Belfield
- 1963 Feb 24 UC Cork 2-01 UC Dublin 2-01 Mardyke
- 1964 Feb 9 UC Galway 4-02 UC Cork 0-01 Pearse Stadium
- 1965 Feb 27 UC Cork 3-02 UC Dublin 0-02 Cherryvale
- 1966 Feb 20 UC Dublin 3-05 UC Cork 2-04 Belfield
- 1967 Feb 7 UC Cork 8-02 UC Dublin 4-02 Mardyke
- 1968 Feb 24 UC Galway 1-02 UC Dublin 0-02 Pearse Stadium
- 1969 Mar 9 UC Dublin 6-02 UC Galway 0-01 Athlone
- 1970 Feb 8 UC Dublin 6-02 UC Galway 1-00 Croke Park
- 1971 Feb 14 UC Dublin 4-02 UC Cork 3-03 Mardyke
- 1972 Feb 20 UC Cork 1-09 UC Dublin 2-01 Pearse Stadium
- 1973 Feb 25 UC Cork 3-06 UC Dublin 3-01 Belfield
- 1974 Feb 17 UC Cork 5-06 UC Galway 1-08 Mardyke
- 1975 Feb 16 UC Cork 2-03 UC Dublin 1-02 Maynooth
- 1976 Feb 15 UC Cork 5-02 UC Galway 1-02 Pearse Stadium
- 1977 Feb 13 UC Cork 6-02 UC Dublin 3-05 Santry
- 1978 Feb 12 UC Galway 3-02 Maynooth 2-00 Corrigan Park
- 1979 Feb 12 UC Galway 4-02 Maynooth 0-04 Coleraine
- 1980 Feb 10 UC Dublin 3-04 UC Cork 3-01 Belfield
- 1981 Feb 15 UC Dublin 1-04 UC Cork 0-05 Mardyke
- 1982 Feb 14 UC Dublin 3-01 UC Cork 0-03 Belfield
- 1983 Feb 13 UC Dublin 2-05 UC Cork 1-07 Pearse Stadium
- 1984 Feb 12 UC Dublin 4-06 Queen's Belfast 2-01 Casement Park
- 1985 Feb 10 UC Cork 8-00 UC Galway 0-06 Santry
- 1986 Feb 9 UC Dublin 5-08 Queen's Belfast 0-02 Coleraine
- 1987 Feb 15 UC Dublin 5-05 UC Galway 0-03 Belfield
- 1988 Feb 14 UC Dublin 2-03 UC Galway 2-01 Mardyke
- 1989 Feb 12 UC Galway 1-02 UC Dublin 0-02 Jordanstown
- 1990 Feb 11 UC Dublin 3-01 UC Galway 0-06 Maynooth
- 1991 Feb 10 Queen's Belfast 3-06 UC Galway 1-3 Turloughmore
- 1992 Feb 9 UU Jordanstown 6-03 Queen's Belfast 3-04 Casement Park
- 1993 Feb 21 UU Jordanstown 3-02 Queen's Belfast 2-03 Belfield
- 1994 Feb 13 UC Galway 3-05 UU Jordanstown 1-09 Coleraine
- 1984 Feb 12 UC Dublin 4-06 Queen's Belfast 2-01 Casement Park
- 1995 Feb 12 U Limerick 0-13 Waterford RTC 1-05 Mardyke
- 1996 Feb 11 UC Cork 3-03 UU Jordanstown 1-05 Belfield
- 1997 Feb 22 UUJ 1-10 UC Dublin 2-05 Casement Park
- 1998 Feb 22 UC Cork 1-07 Waterford IT 1-06 Walsh Park
- 1999 Feb 14 Waterford IT 1-06 UC Cork 0-04 Limerick
- 2000 Feb 20 UC Cork 2-03 UC Dublin 1-05 Dangan, Galway
- 2001 Feb 17 U Limerick 2-06 Waterford IT 1-08 Athlone
- 2002 Feb 17 UC Cork 1-11 Waterford IT 1-04 Ballinlough, Cork
- 2003 Feb 16 UC Cork 1-10 UC Dublin 0-06 Mardyke
- 2004 Feb 15 U Limerick 6-5 UC Dublin 1-08 O'Toole Park Crumlin
- 2005 Feb 27 U Limerick 0-12 UC Dublin 1-04 Ballygunner
- 2006 Feb 26 U Limerick 0-13 UC Dublin 1-09 Limerick
- 2007 Feb 23 UC Dublin 2-10 UC Cork 1-04 Ballinderreen
- 2008 Feb 24 UC Dublin 5-09 Waterford IT 0-09 Casement Park
- 2009 Feb 22 Waterford IT 1-09 UC Dublin 1-06 Páirc Uí Rinn
- 2010 Feb 21 Waterford IT 0-11 UC Cork 1-06 Cork IT
- 2011 Feb 20 Waterford IT 2-10 UC Cork 2-02 Pearse Stadium
- 2012 Feb 19 Waterford IT 2-08 U Limerick 0-04 Carraiganore
- 2013 Feb 17 Waterford IT 3-13 U Limerick 2-15 North Campus, UL
- 2014 Feb 16 U Limerick 0-12 Waterford IT 1-08 QUB Grounds, Upper Malone, Belfast
- 2015 Feb 15 Waterford IT 2-12 U Limerick 0-12 DCU Sports Campus
- 2016 Feb 14 U Limerick 3-12 UC Cork 4-07 Gort
- 2017 Feb 12 U Limerick 2-08 UC Cork 1-07 Abbotstown
- 2018 Feb 21 U Limerick 0-15 UCC 1-09 Mallow complex
- 2019 Feb 10 U Limerick 3-08 UC Cork 0-08 Mallow complex
- 2020 Feb 16 U Limerick 3-12 UCC 0-10 - WIT Arena
- 2022 Feb 13 DCU DÉ 1-14 UCD 0-05 - WIT Arena
- 2023 Feb 12 TU Dublin 1-11 UCC 0-13 - UCD Sport
- 2024 Feb 11 U Limerick 6-11 TU Dublin 1-12 - University of Galway Connacht GAA Air Dome, Bekan, Mayo
- 2025 Feb 9 U Limerick 3-10 UCC 1-12 - Connacht GAA Air Dome, Bekan, Mayo
- 2026 Feb 8 UCC 2-15 UCD 0-07 - DCU Sportsgrounds

== Purcell Cup Finals ==
- 2004 Athlone IT
- 2005 Garda College, Templemore
- 2006 University of Ulster, Jordanstown
- 2007 Athlone IT
- 2008 Queen's University
- 2009 Athlone IT
- 2010 DIT
- 2011 Queen's University 2-10 DCU 0-07 NUIG
- 2012 DCU 4-07 Queen's University 0-04 Waterford IT Sports Campus
- 2013 DCU 2-11 Mary I Limerick 1-09 North Campus, UL
- 2014 UCC 1-11 DIT 0-07 QUB Grounds, Upper Malone, Belfast
- 2015 Mary I 1-12 DIT 0-08 (Replay) Ballykelly
- 2016 Cork IT 1-12 Maynooth University 0-04 Gort
- 2017 DIT 1-08 Maynooth University 1-06 Abbotstown
- 2018 NUIG
- 2019 Maynooth University 1-11 NUIG 1-10 Mallow complex
- 2020 UCD 1-06 TU Dublin 0-05 - WIT Arena
- 2021 Not Played
- 2022 TU Dublin 0-12 NUIG 0-08 WIT Arena
- 2023 MTU Cork 2-10 University of Galway 0-12 Abbotstown
- 2024 University of Galway 5-27 SETU Carlow 1-09 University of Galway Connacht GAA Air Dome, Bekan, Mayo
- 2025 Mary I
- 2026 UL 2-09 Queen's University 1-09

== Fr Meachair Cup Finals ==
- 2012 Mary I Limerick 0-15 St Pats Drumcondra 0-03 Waterford IT Sports Campus
- 2013 St Pats Drumcondra 2-05 Carlow IT 1-03 North Campus, UL
- 2014 Carlow IT 1-09 St Pats Drumcondra 1-05 QUB Grounds, Upper Malone, Belfast
- 2015 Carlow IT 2-10 St. Mary's 1-10 DCU Sports Campus
- 2016 Trinity College Dublin 1-10 Athlone IT 0-08 Gort
- 2017 St Patrick's College Drumcondra 3-08 Athlone IT 1-03 Abbotstown
- 2018
- 2019 Athlone IT 1-11 Trinity College Dublin 1-04
- 2020 Trinity College Dublin 0-13 UCD 0-08 - WIT Arena
- 2021 Not Played
- 2022 UCC 1-09 UCD 0-08 - WIT Arena
- 2023
- 2024
- 2025
- 2026 University of Galway 5-19 Trinity College Dublin 1-05

== Ashbourne All-Stars ==
For many years a Combined Universities team was selected after the Ashbourne Cup event to play Cork county team for the Cronin Cup. Later the Combined Universities played the Combined Colleges. In 2004 the. Higher Education] committee of Cumann Camógaíochta na nGael instituted Ashbourne All-Stars for the best players in each position at the end of the tournament.

=== 2006 ===
Rosanna Kenneally (WIT & Tipperary), Catherine O'Loughlin (UCD & Wexford), Angela Walsh (UL & Cork), Rena Buckley (UCD & Cork), Jenny Duffy (Cork IT & Cork), Anna Geary (UL & Cork), Michelle Shortt (Garda College & Tipperary), Louise Mahoney (UCD & Laois), Colette Desmond (UCC & Cork), Laura Linnane (NUIG & Galway), Rachel Moloney (UCC & Cork), Cora Hennessy (Cork IT & Tipperary), Marie O'Connor (Garda College & Kilkenny), Amanda Regan (UL & Cork), Sharon Daly (UCD & Offaly)

=== 2007 ===
Mags Darcy (UCD & Wexford), Clodagh Flanagan (UCD & Kildare), Jennifer Browne (UCC & Cork), Mairead Luttrell (UCD & Tipperary), Mary Leacy (UCD & Wexford), Fionnuala Carr (Jordanstown & Down), Cathriona Foley (UCC & Cork), Rena Buckley (UCD & Cork), Julianne Woodcock (UCD & Kilkenny), Claire McMahon (NUIG & Clare), Brenda Hanney (Cork IT & Galway), Aine Lyng (UL & Waterford), Susie O'Carroll (UCD & Kildare), Ursula Jacob (WIT & Wexford), Marie O'Connor (Garda College & Kilkenny)

=== 2008 ===
Rosanna Kenneally (WIT & Waterford), Therese Shortt (WIT & Tipperary), Mary Leacy (UCD & Wexford), Michelle Casey (Garda College & Liemrick), Sheila Sullivan (UL & Offaly), Fionnuala Carr (Jordanstown & Down), Cathriona Foley (UCC & Cork), Rena Buckley (UCD & Cork), Ann Dalton (UCD & Kilkenny), Susie O'Carroll (UCD & Kildare), Aine Lyng (UL & Waterford), Fiona Lafferty (UL & Clare), Ursula Jacob (WIT & Wexford), Aoife McLoughney (UCC & Tipperary), Una Leacy (UCC & Wexford) .

=== 2009 ===
Mags Darcy (UCD & Wexford), Keeva Fennelly (WIT & Kilkenny), Mairéad Luttrell (UCD & Tipperary), Lorraine Ryan (NUIG & Galway), Mary Leacy (UCD & Wexford), Kelly-Anne Cottrell (WIT & Kilkenny), Stacey Redmond (WIT & Wexford), Rena Buckley (UCD & Cork), Ann Dalton (WIT & Kilkenny), Collette Dormer (WIT & Kilkenny), Aoife McLoughney (UCC & Tipperary), Susie O'Carroll (UCD & Kildare), Ursula Jacob (WIT & Wexford), Michelle Quilty (WIT & Kilkenny)

=== 2010 ===
Eleanor Mallon (Jordanstown & Antrim), Mairéad Luttrell (UCD & Tipperary), Sabrina Larkin (UL & Tipperary), Gráinne Stapleton (UCD & Kilkenny), Collette Dormer (WIT & Kilkenny), Fionnuala Carr (UCC & Down), Jill Horan (UCC & Cork), Katrina Parrock (WIT & Wexford), Alison Maguire (UCD & Dublin), Gráinne Kenneally (UCC & Waterford), Áine Lyng (UL & Kilkenny), Patricia Jackman (WIT & Waterford), Fiona Lafferty (UL & Clare), Ursula Jacob (WIT & Wexford), Deirdre Twomey (NUIG & Cork)

=== 2011 ===
Susan Earner (UCC & Galway) Collette Dormer (WIT & Kilkenny), Leann Fennelly (UCD & Kilkenny), Julie Brien (UCC & Galway) Ann Dalton (WIT & Kilkenny), Michaela Morgan (NUIG & Offaly), Patricia Jackman (WIT & Waterford) Katrina Parrock (WIT & Wexford), Chloe Morey (NUIG & Clare) Michaela Convery (Jordanstown & Antrim), Katie Power (WIT & Kilkenny), Lisa Bolger (UL & Offaly) Katriona Mackey (UCC & Cork), Denise Gaule (WIT & Kilkenny), Michelle Quilty (WIT & Kilkenny)

=== 2012 ===
Emma Staunton (UCD & Kilkenny), Ruth Jones (WIT & Kilkenny), Sarah Anne Fitzgerald (WIT & Laois), Shonagh Curran (UL & Waterford), Patricia Jackman (WIT & Waterford), Susan Vaughan (UL & Cork), Niamh O'Dea (UL & Cork), Lisa Bolger (UL & Wexford), Maria Walsh (UL & Cork), Joanne Casey (UCC & Cork) Sara Louise Carr (Jordanstown & Down), Denise Gaule (WIT & Kilkenny), Marie Dargan (WIT & Kilkenny), Katie Power (WIT & Kilkenny), Katrina Parrock (WIT & Wexford),

=== 2020 ===
Edel McNamara (WIT & Clare), Róisín Phelan (UCC & Kilkenny), Aisling Brennan (WIT & Offaly), Ciara Doyle (WIT & Clare), Kerrie Finnegan (TU Dublin & Dublin), Karen Kennedy (UL & Tipperary), Sibéal Harney (UCC & Waterford), Mairéad Burke (UL & Galway), Chloe Sigerson (UCC & Cork), Beth Carton (UL & Waterford), Orla Cronin (UCC & Cork), Laura Stack (Trinity & Limerick), Chloe Foxe(UCD & Wexford), Áine ní Chrothaigh (Marino & Waterford), Siobhán McGrath (UL & Galway)

=== 2021 ===
Competitions not Played due to COVID-19.

=== 2022 ===
Sarah Ahern (UCC & Cork), Ciara O'Shea (DCU & Kilkenny), Sorcha Ryan (UCD & Tipperary), Sarah Delaney (UCD & Tipperary), Jane Cass (DCU & Kilkenny), Niamh Deely (DCU & Kilkenny), Issy Davis (UCD & Dublin), Ciara O'Connor (DCU & Wexford), Jody Couch (TU Dublin & Dublin), Tiffanie Fitzgerald (NUIG & Kilkenny), Kate Kenny (DCU & Offaly), Steffi Fitzgerald (DCU & Kilkenny), Abby Flynn (DCU & Waterford), Emma Murphy (UCC & Cork), Megan Shields (TU Dublin & Cavan)

== Purcell All-Stars ==
Purcell All-Stars were first selected from the Purcell Cup participant teams in 2006, rewarding the best players in each position at the end of the tournament.

=== 2010 ===
Martina O'Brien (IT Tralee); Karen Mullins (DIT), Therese Lynn (Maynooth), Sara Ryan (DIT); Rachel Ruddy (Trinity), Edwina Keane (IT Tralee), Aileen O'Loughlin (DIT); Jane Dolan (DIT), Paula Kenny (Garda College); Christine Kenny (DCU), Keelin Bradley (Queen's), Niamh Mulcahy (Mary I); Shauna Jordan (Queen's), Colette McSorley (Queen's), Louise Walsh (Maynooth)

=== 2011 ===
Laura Quinn (QUB & Derry); Gráinne Quinn (DIT & Dublin), Kate Lynch (Mary I Limerick & Clare), Laura Twomey (DCU & Dublin); Mairead Short (QUB & Armagh), Cathriona Foley (Trinity & Cork), Emma Brennan (DCU & Cork); Jane Dolan (DIT & Meath), Keelan Bradley (QUB & Derry); Cathy Bowes (DIT & Galway), Colette McSorley (QUB & Armagh), Aoife Burke (DIT & Laois); Sinead Cassidy (QUB & Derry), Orlaith Murphy (IT Tralee & Cork), Joeleen Hoary (DIT & Dublin);

=== 2012 ===
Gráinne Smyth (DIT & Dublin), Rebecca Cleere (Maynooth & Kilkenny), Lisa Carey (DCU & Kilkenny), Danielle McCrystal (QUB & Derry), Mairéad Power (DCU & Kilkenny), Emma Brennan (DCU & Carlow), Kristina Troy (Maynooth & Meath), Katie Campbell (Mary I Limerick & Limerick), Laura Twomey (DCU & Dublin), Orlaith Walsh (St Pats, Drumcondra & Kilkenny), Sinéad Cassidy (QUB & Derry), Ciara Donnelly (QUB & Armagh), Orla Durkan (DCU & Dublin), Naomi Carroll (Mary I Limerick & Clare), Denise Luby (Cork IT & Cork)
