= 2012 Ashbourne Cup =

Ashbourne Cup 2012
Tournament details
- Date: December 2011 – 19 February 2012
- Teams: 6

Winners
- Champions: Waterford IT (6th title)
- Manager: Helena Jacob
- Captain: Patricia Jackman

Runners-up
- Runners-up: University of Limerick
- Captain: Niamh O'Dea

Other
- Matches played: 4

The 2012 Ashbourne Cup inter-collegiate camogie championship was staged at the Waterford IT sports complex in Carraiganore over the weekend of 18–19 February. It was won for the fourth time in succession by Waterford Institute of Technology, after defeating University of Limerick in the final by ten points after UL's semi-final victory over Waterford's opponents in the 2010 and 2011 finals. Player of the tournament was WIT's Katrina Parrock.

== The Final ==
The turning point in the final arrived midway through the second half when All Ireland medallist midfielder Katrina Parrock switched into full forward and made no scored a goal from close range. Marie Dargan added a second goal three minutes later. Waterford IT then pulled away with four unanswered points. Their Waterford IT forward line consisted of five Kilkenny county players.

== Arrangements ==
The format was changed for the 2012 competition. In the final stages of the competition, six teams were divided into two groups of three in which each team plays two matches. The top two in each group went through to the cup semi finals while the bottom team in each group played in the final of the Ashbourne Shield. UL defeated University College Cork in the semi-final by 0–10 to 1–5 and WIT defeated UCD 3–12 to 2–4. UUJ won the Ashbourne Shield defeating NUIG 2–13 to 3–9 with goals from Karen Kielty and Captain Sara Louise Carr.

== Purcell Cup ==
The Purcell Cup was also re-formatted to a six-team competition and won by Dublin City University for the first time. DCU beat NUIM 5–12 to 1–6 and defending Purcell Cup champions Queen's University Belfast defeated Dublin Institute of Technology 4–9 to 0–4 in the semi-finals. Goals from Aoife Bugler, Catriona Regan, Orlaith Durkan and Emma Brennan the helped Dublin City University to a 4–7 to 0–4 victory over Queen's in the Purcell Cup final. In the Ashbourne Shield University of Ulster Jordanstown recorded a thrilling 2–13 to 3–9 win over National University of Ireland Galway. Denise Luby scored 3–4 as Cork Institute of Technology were 4–11 to 0–2 winners in the Purcell Shield final against Athlone IT.

== Fr Meachair Cup ==
Previously a sevens tournament, the Fr Meachair Cup was re-formatted as a third division inter-collegiate competition in 2012 and played in Waterford's De La Salle pitch over the Ashbourne weekend. Naomi Carroll scored ten points for Mary Immaculate College as they achieved a 0–15 to 0–3 win over St Patrick's College, Drumcondra in the Fr Meachair Cup final. In the Fr Meachair Cup semi-finals, St Patrick's College (2–8) defeated Trinity College (1–3) and Mary Immaculate College (3–10) defeated IT Carlow (0–4). St Mary's Belfast defeated IT Tralee 3–6 to 3–4 in the Fr Meachair Shield decider.

== Ó Mhaolagáin cup ==
Soaring star Áine Keogh helped Dundalk IT win the reinvented Ó Mhaolagáin cup defeating Galway-Mayo Institute of Technology in the final. Limerick IT and Marino (who had Tara Ruttledge on their team) were the defeated semi-finalists. University of Ulster Coleraine defeated Coláiste Froebel in the inaugural O’Mhaolagáin Shield final.

== Ashbourne All Stars ==
The Ashbourne All Stars were selected at the end of the tournament. Emma Staunton (UCD & Kilkenny), Ruth Jones (WIT & Kilkenny), Sarah Anne Fitzgerald (WIT & Laois), Shonagh Curran (UL & Waterford), Patricia Jackman (WIT & Waterford), Susan Vaughan (UL & Cork), Niamh O'Dea (UL & Cork), Lisa Bolger (UL & Wexford), Marie Walsh (UL & Cork), Joanne Casey (UCC & Cork) Sara Louise Carr (Jordanstown & Down), Denise Gaule (WIT & Kilkenny), Marie Dargan (WIT & Kilkenny), Katie Power (WIT & Kilkenny), Katrina Parrock (WIT & Wexford),

== Purcell All Stars ==
The Purcell All Stars were selected at the end of the tournament. Gráinne Smyth (DIT & Dublin), Rebecca Cleere (Maynooth) & Kilkenny), Lisa Carey (DCU & Kilkenny), Danielle McCrystal (QUB & Derry), Mairéad Power (DCU & Kilkenny), Emma Brennan (DCU & Carlow), Kristina Troy (Maynooth) & Meath), Katie Campbell (Mary I Limerick & Limerick), Laura Twomey (DCU & Dublin), Orlaith Walsh (St Pat's, Drumcondra & Kilkenny), Sinéad Cassidy (QUB & Derry), Ciara Donnelly (QUB & Armagh), Orla Durkan (DCU & Dublin), Naomi Carroll (Mary I Limerick & Clare), Denise Luby (Cork IT & Cork)

== Fixtures and results ==
=== Ashbourne/Purcell Playoff ===
29 November

Jordanstown	5–9 – 3–12	Cork IT

St Loman's Mullingar

The play-off determined that Jordanstown would play in the Ashbourne Cup and Cork IT would play in the Purcell Cup.

=== Group A ===
25 January

Waterford IT	0–11 – 0–4	NUI Galway

Carraiganore

1 February

Waterford IT	2–13 – 0–9	U Limerick

U Limerick

8 February

U Limerick	1–10 – 0–7	NUI Galway

Dangan

Team	Pld	W	D	L	F	A	Diff	Pts
Waterford IT	2	2	0	0	2–24	0–13	+17	4
U Limerick	2	1	0	1	1–19	2–20	−3	2
NUI Galway	2	0	0	2	0–11	1–21	−13	0

=== Group B ===
20 June

UC Cork	0–11 – 0–4	UC Dublin

The Mardyke

27 June

UC Dublin	2–14 – 2–8	Jordanstown

Belfield

11 July

UC Cork	2–25 – 5–5	Jordanstown

Blanchardstown

Ashbourne group B

Team	Pld	W	D	L	F	A	Diff	Pts
UC Cork	2	2	0	0	2–36	6–9	+14	4
UC Dublin	2	1	0	1	3–18	2–19	+2	2
Jordanstown	2	0	0	2	7–13	4–39	–17	2

18 February
Semi-final

University of Limerick	0–10 – 1–5	University College Cork

Carraiganore

20 February
Semi-final

University of Limerick	3–12– 2–4	University College Dublin

Carraiganore

2011-02-20
Final
15:00 BST

Waterford IT	2–8 – 0–4	University of Limerick
M Dargan 1–2, K Parrock 1–0, E Comerford 0–3 (frees), P Jackman 0–2 (frees), D Gaule 0–1.	Camogie.ie	C Devane 0–3 (frees), M Walsh 0–1

Carraiganore
Attendance: 1,200
Referee: Cathal Egan (Cork)

Waterford IT	University of Limerick

WIT:
GK	1	Kristina Kenneally (Tipperary)
RCB	2	Ruth Jones (Kilkenny)
FB	3	Sarah Anne Fitzgerald (Laois)
LCB	4	Lorraine Keen (Offaly)
RWB	5	Patricia Jackman (Waterford)
CB	6	Collette Dormer (Kilkenny)
LWB	7	Aisling Carroll (Tipperary)
MF	8	K O'Donoghue (Cork)
MF	9	Katrina Parrock (Wexford)
RWF	10	Denise Gaule (Kilkenny)
CF	11	Michelle Quilty (Kilkenny) (substituted on) 62'
LWF	12	Shelley Farrell (Kilkenny)
RCF	13	Marie Dargan (Kilkenny)
FF	14	Katie Power (Kilkenny)
LCF	15	Emma Comerford (Kilkenny) (substituted on) 62'
Substitutes:
FF		L Sinnott (Wexford) for M Quilty (substituted on) 62'
FF		M Doyle (Wexford) for E Comerford (substituted on) 64'

UL:
GK	1	Síle Moynihan (Limerick)
RCB	2	Caroline Motherway (Cork)
FB	3	Shonagh Curran (Waterford)
LCB	4	Edel Frisby (Kilkenny)
RWB	5	Ella Ryan (Cork)
CB	6	Susan Vaughan (Clare)
LWB	7	Niamh O'Dea (Clare)
MF	8	Niamh Richardson (Limerick)
MF	9	Marie Walsh (Cork)
RWF	10	Lisa Bolger (Wexford)
CF	11	Cait Devane (Tipperary)
LWF	12	Roisin Byrne (Kilkenny)
RCF	13	Julia White (Cork)
FF	14	[Mairéad Scanlon (Clare) (substituted off) 37'
LCF	15	Linda Bolger (Wexford)
Substitutes:
FF		Finola Keely (Galway) for M Scanlon (substituted on) 37'

MATCH RULES

- 60 minutes
- Extra Time if scores level
- Maximum of 5 substitutions

Preceded by 2011 Ashbourne Cup	Ashbourne Cup; 1915–present	Succeeded by 2012 Ashbourne Cup
