= 2009 Ashbourne Cup =

Ashbourne Cup 2009
Tournament details
- Date: Jan 2009 – 22 Feb
- Teams: 8

Winners
- Champions: Waterford IT (2nd title)
- Captain: Keeva Fennelly

Runners-up
- Runners-up: University College Cork
- Captain: Rena Buckley

Other
- Matches played: 7

The 2009 Ashbourne Cup inter-collegiate camogie championship was staged in Cork over the weekend of February 21–22. It was won by Waterford Institute of Technology who defeated the hosts UCC in Saturday's semi-final in The Mardyke before denying University College Dublin the three-in-a-row in the final by three points in Páirc Uí Rinn 24 hours later. Player of the tournament was WIT's Stacey Redmond.

== The Final ==
Waterford's victory was inspired by a fifth-minute goal from Mullinavat's Michelle Quilty who combined effectively with Wexford duo Stacey Redmond and Ursula Jacob to shoot past Wexford inter-county team-mate Mags Darcy. Waterford led 1–6 to 0–1 at half-time. UCC came back in the second half when they had the breeze with strong performances from Wexford's Mary Leacy and Cork's Rena Buckley but their goal from another Wexford inter-county player Una Leacy 10 minutes from the end was not enough.

== Shield ==
Galway's Lorraine Ryan scored 1–8 of NUIG's total in a 1–14 to 2–10 victory over University of Limerick. Edel Maher and Maire O'Neill scored first half goals for Limerick who led 2–7 to 0–4 at half time.

=== Results ===
2009-02-22
Final
15:00 BST

Waterford IT	1–9 – 1–6	University College Cork
Michelle Quilty 1–1, Ursula Jacob 0–4, Jennifer Simpson 0–2, Ann Dalton 0–1, Susan Keane 0–1	Camogie.ie	Una Leacy 1–0, Susie O'Carroll 0–5, Alison Maguire 0–1 .

Cork IT
Attendance: 600
Referee: Eamonn Browne (Tipperary)

Waterford IT	University College Cork

WIT:
GK	1	Kay Ryall (Kilkenny)
RCB	2	Keeva Fennelly (Kilkenny)
FB	3	Karen Atkinson (Wexford)
LCB	4	Therése Shortt (Tipperary)
RWB	5	Pauline Cunningham (Waterford)
CB	6	Áine Fahy (Kilkenny)
LWB	7	Kelly-Anne Cottrell (Kilkenny)
MF	8	Stacey Redmond (Wexford)
MF	9	Ann Dalton (Kilkenny) 0–1
RWF	10	Fiona Morrissey (Limerick)
CF	11	Collette Dormer (Kilkenny)
LWF	12	Jennifer Simpson (Waterford) 0–2
RCF	13	Susan Keane (Galway) 0–1
FF	14	Ursula Jacob (Wexford) 0–4 (all frees)
LCF	15	Michelle Quilty (Kilkenny) 1–1

UCC:
GK	1	Mags D'Arcy (Wexford)
RCB	2	Emma Dunne (Cork)
FB	3	Mairéad Lutrell (Tipperary)
LCB	4	Therése Menton (Galway)
RWB	5	Leann Fennelly (Kilkenny)
CB	6	Mary Leacy (Wexford)
LWB	7	Elaine O'Neill (Kilkenny)
MF	8	Rena Buckley (Cork) (substituted off) Temp'
MF	9	Julianne Woodcock (Kilkenny)
RWF	10	Charlotte Raher (Waterford)
CF	11	Alison Maguire (Dublin) 0–1
LWF	12	Fiona Phelan (Kilkenny) (substituted off) 22'
RCF	13	Susie O'Carroll (Kildare) (0–5, 4 frees 1 '45)
FF	14	Una Leacy (Wexford) 1–0
LCF	15	Emile Darmody (Kilkenny) (substituted off) 17'
Substitutes:
MF		Lena Monaghan (Galway) for Buckley temporarily twice (substituted on) Temp'
LCF		Denise McGrath (Westmeath) for Darmody (substituted on) 17'
LWF		Lisa Abbey (Carlow) for Phelan (substituted on) 25'

Match Rules

- 60 minutes
- Extra Time if scores level
- Maximum of 5 substitutions

Preceded by 2008 Ashbourne Cup	Ashbourne Cup; 1915–present	Succeeded by 2010 Ashbourne Cup
