= Gael Linn Cup 2011 =

Winners
- Champions: Munster (17th junior title)

Runners-up
- Runners-up: Leinster

Other
- Matches played: 3

The 2011 Gael Linn Cup, the most important representative competition for elite level participants in the women's team field sport of camogie, was played at junior level according to the on a bi-ennial programme devised by congress 2010. It was won by Munster, who defeated Leinster in the final, played at St Jude's in Dubin.

== Final stages ==
15 May
Semi-final

Leinster	2–16 – 1–8	Connacht
Aine Mahony 2–1, Susie O'Carroll 0–4 (0-2f), Jane Dolan 0–3, Louise Mahony, P Greville, S Hurley 0–1 each.		S O'Brien 1–2, Aoife Lynskey, K Hopkins 0–3 each.

St Jude's
15 May
Semi-final

Munster	2–9 – 1–8	Ulster
Patricia Jackman 2–1, Niamh Mulcahy 0–5, (0-3f), Orla Curtin, Karen Kelly, Nicole Morrissey 0–1 each		Nicola Branniff 1–0, Colette Mc Sorley 0–6, Karen Kielt, Meabh McGoldrick 0–1 each.

St Jude's
16 May 2010
Final
16:00 BST

Munster	1–15 – 2–11	Leinster
Karen Kelly 1–3, Niamh Mulcahy 0–4, Niamh Rockett 0–3, Patricia Jackman 0–2, Orla Curtin, Aoife Hannon, Jennie Simpson 0–1 each	Camogie.ie	Aoife Mahony 2–1, Susie O'Carroll 0–4 (0-2f), Jane Dolan 0–3, Louise Mahony, Pamela Greville, Siobhán Hurley 0–1 each.

St Jude's
Referee: Paul Beecher (Dublin)

Munster	Leinster

MUNSTER:
GK	1	Aisling O'Brien (Waterford)
RCB	2	Emma Hannon(Waterford)
FB	3	Jennie Simpson (Waterford) 0–1
LCB	4	Aideen McNamara (Limerick)
RWB	5	Kate Maire Hearne(Waterford) 0–1
CB	6	Charlotte Raher (Waterford)
LWB	7	Pauline Cunningham (Waterford)
MF	8	Grainne Kenneally (Waterford)
MF	9	Deirdre Fahey (Waterford)
RWF	10	Niamh Rockett (Waterford) 0–4
CF	11	Niamh Mulcahy (Limerick) 0–3 (2f)
LWF	12	Orla Curtin (Limerick) 0–1
RCF	13	Nicola Morrissey (Waterford) (substituted off) 53'
FF	14	Patricia Jackman (Waterford) 0–2 (2 45s)
LCF	15	Karen Kelly (Waterford) 1–3.
Substitutes:
FF		Aoife Hannon (Waterford) for Morrissey (substituted in) 53'

LEINSTER:
GK	1	Emily Mangan (Meath)
RCB	2	Regina Gorman (Kildare) (substituted off) 40'
FB	3	Aoife Thompson (Meath)
LCB	4	Áine Keogh (Meath)
RWB	5	Aoife Trant (Kildare)
CB	6	Kristina Troy (Meath)
LWB	7	Louise Donoghue (Meath)
MF	8	Louise Mahony (Laois) 0–1
MF	9	Elaine Mahony (Laois)
RWF	10	Pamela Greville (Westmeath)
CF	11	Siobhán Hurley (Kildare) 0–1
LWF	12	Jane Dolan (Meath) 0–3
RCF	13	Áine Mahony (Laois) 2–1
FF	14	Susie O'Carroll (Kildare) 0–5 (2f 45)
LCF	15	Fiona Trant (Kildare) (substituted off) 30'
Substitutes:
FF		Lizzie Oakes (Meath) for Fiona Trant (substituted in) 30'
LWF		Angela Lyons (Kildare) for Regina Gorman (substituted in) 40'

MATCH RULES
- 60 minutes
- Extra Time if scores level
- Maximum of 5 substitutions

Preceded by Gael Linn Cup 2010	Gael Linn Cup; 1954 – present	Succeeded by Gael Linn Cup 2012
