= Stephen Dormer =

Personal information
- Native name: Stíofán Dormer (Irish)
- Born: Kilkenny, Ireland

Sport
- Sport: Camogie
- Position: position
Club*
Years	Club	Apps (scores)
	Club	?
Inter-county**
Years	County	Apps (scores)
	Kilkenny	?
- * club appearances and scores correct as of (16:31, 30 June 2010 (UTC)). **Inter County team apps and scores correct as of (16:31, 30 June 2010 (UTC)).

Stephen Dormer is a camogie manager, winner of a manager of the year award in 2007 jointly with Liam Dunne and Stellah Sinnott. His sister Collette Dormer was an All Ireland finalist in 2009.
