= Elaine Aylward =

Camogie player

Personal information
- Native name: Elaine Ní Aighleart (Irish)
- Born: 1985 (age 40–41) Kilkenny, Ireland

Sport
- Sport: Camogie
- Position: Wing back
Club
- Years: Club
- [ Mullinavat]
Inter-county
- Years: County
- 2002-2014: Kilkenny
Inter-county titles
- All Stars: 1

Elaine Aylward is a camogie player and a bank official, winner of a camogie All Star award in 2009. She played in the 2009 All Ireland camogie final.

== Career ==
Described in the programme notes for the 2009 All Ireland final as "a defender whose forceful runs paid big dividends" in the 2009 All Ireland semi-final, Elaine won a Junior All-Ireland in 2002 and added a National League medal in 2008. She won a Gael Linn Cup medal with Leinster as well as three provincial Senior titles. Her senior debut was in 2002.
