= All-Ireland Sevens Camogie =

Camogie tournament

All-Ireland Sevens Camogie Competitions are seven-a-side national inter-club or inter-college Camogie tournaments held at senior, junior, legends/master, colleges and inter-varsity level.

The main competition is held at the Kilmacud Crokes GAA club in South County Dublin, played off in one day annually the day before the All-Ireland Camogie Final in close proximity to Croke Park as part of the All-Ireland festivities. It is known as the Baker Tilly All Ireland Camogie 7s for sponsorship purposes. The current (2019) holders are De La Salle.

The secondary school colleges competitions are held in November and the inter-varsity competition, the Fr Meachair Cup, in March.
