= Keeva Fennelly =

Personal information
- Native name: Caoimhe Ní Fhionnalaigh (Irish)
- Born: 1987 (age 38–39) Kilkenny, Ireland

Sport
- Sport: Camogie
- Position: Centre field
Club*
Years	Club	Apps (scores)
2007 – present	Ballyhale Shamrocks	?
Inter-county**
Years	County	Apps (scores)
2002 – present	Kilkenny	?
- * club appearances and scores correct as of (16:31, 30 December 2009 (UTC)). **Inter County team apps and scores correct as of (16:31, 30 December 2009 (UTC)).

Keeva Fennelly (born 1987) is a camogie player and financial reporter. She played in the 2009 All Ireland camogie final.

== Career ==
Fennelly won an All-Ireland Junior medal in 2002 and a National League medal in 2008. She was the 2009 Waterford IT Ashbourne Cup and league-winning captain.

== Family background ==
Fennelly's father Ger and uncles all gave distinguished service to Kilkenny. She has two first cousins, Leann Fennelly and Kelly Ann Cotterell, on the 2009 All Ireland panel, while another cousin, Michael Fennelly, captained the Kilkenny hurlers in 2009.
