= Jacqui Frisby =

Personal information
- Native name: Seacailín Ní Fhriosbaigh (Irish)
- Born: 1985 (age 40–41) Kilkenny, Ireland

Sport
- Sport: Camogie
- Position: Corner back
Club
- Years: Club
- 2002 – present: Ballyhale Shamrocks
Inter-county
- Years: County
- 2000 – present: Kilkenny
Inter-county titles
- All-Irelands: 1
- All Stars: 1

Jacqui Frisby is a camogie player and an accounts assistant, winner of a camogie All Star award in 2009. She played in the 2009 All Ireland camogie final. An All-Ireland Junior medal winner in 2002, Jacqui added a National League medal in 2008. She holds Leinster titles in the Under- 14, Under-16, Under-18, Junior and Senior grades along with an All-Ireland Schools 'B' medal. Her brother represented Kilkenny at under-age level. Her senior debut was in 2001.
