= 2009 All-Ireland Senior Camogie Championship final =

2009 All-Ireland Senior Camogie Final
- Event: All-Ireland Senior Camogie Championship 2009
Cork	Kilkenny
0–15	0–7
- Date: 13 September 2009
- Venue: Croke Park, Dublin
- Man of the Match: Cathriona Foley (Cork)
- Referee: Úna Kearney (Armagh)
- Attendance: 25,924

The 2009 All-Ireland Senior Camogie Championship Final, the 78th event of its type, is the culmination of the 2009 All-Ireland Senior Camogie Championship.

Cork had an easy win.
