= Walton Institute =

Irish research institute

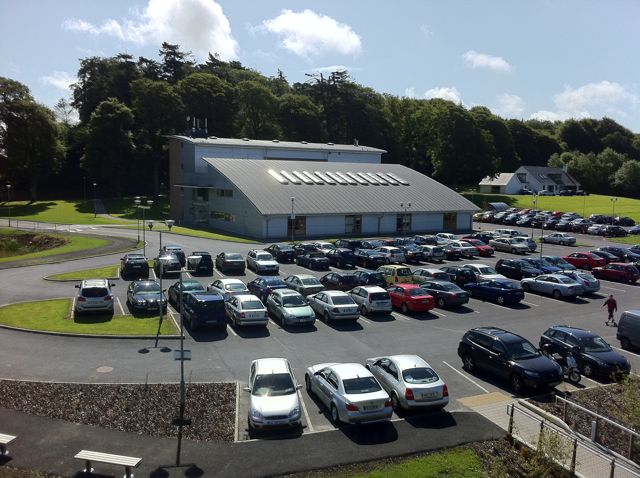
ArcLabs Building, SETU Waterford West Campus, Carriganore, Co Waterford, Ireland

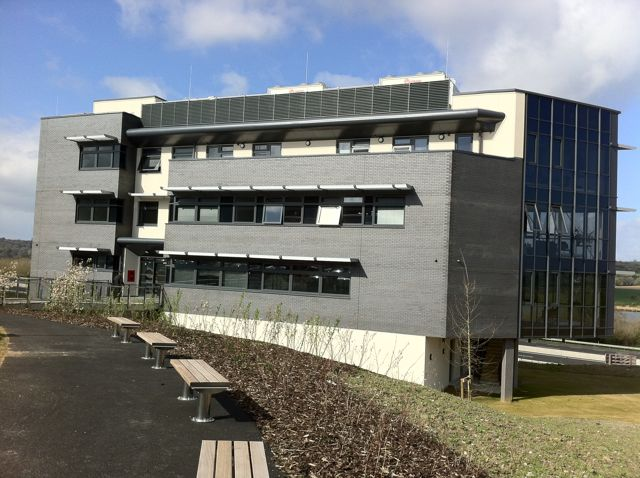
Walton Institute NetLabs Building, SETU Waterford West Campus, Carriganore, Co Waterford, Ireland

The Walton Institute, formerly the Telecommunications Software & Systems Group (TSSG), is an Irish information and communications technologies (ICT) research institute in the Waterford Institute of Technology. It is based in the SETU West Campus, having brought in the funding for the two research buildings located there: ArcLabs Research and Innovation Centre opened in 2005, and NetLabs opened in 2011,

== History ==
The TSSG was established in 1996 by Willie Donnelly and Eamonn de Leastar. They were joined later by Mícheál Ó Foghlú and Barry Downes to form the executive team. Initially the group was focused on applied research funded by a series of European Union Framework Programmes for Research and Technological Development projects. The group built on this foundation to address basic research, funded by the Higher Education Authority's PRTLI programme, FutureComm (Serving Society), and by a series of Science Foundation Ireland projects including FAME. In parallel, the TSSG strengthened its focus on industry, particularly through commercialisation activity funded by Enterprise Ireland (e.g. IMS-ARCS). As well as licensing technology to existing companies the TSSG has been actively engaged in the creation or attraction of over 17 start-up companies (spin-in and spin-outs) from 2000 to 2017, such as FeedHenry and Zolk C creating over 100 additional jobs directly in the region.

The TSSG has grown in size since it was established, and has employed over 80 staff and students from 2004 onwards, funded by an active portfolio of between 30 and 40 research projects at any one time. In its history, it has brought in €65 million of funding from over 160 individual projects.

In 2010, Mícheál Ó Foghlú took a leave of absence from the TSSG to found FeedHenry, a mobile enterprise startup specialising in making app creation for businesses seamless. In 2014, FeedHenry was acquired by Red Hat for €63.5 million.

In 2011 the TSSG restructured into a series of Research Units (RUs) that each have active basic, applied and commercial activity. More narrowly focused units are called groups rather than units, usually driven by a single funding source rather than a mixture of funding groups. These units collaborate on larger projects, and bring in funding to grow each of these research areas.

In March 2014, Ruairi Quinn, Minister for Education, officially opened NetLabs, as part of the Research and Innovation cluster of WIT's West Campus.

In September 2019, Dr. Sasitharan Balasubramaniam was appointed as Director of Research to join Kevin Doolin, Director of Innovation to drive the research centre towards investigating futuristic next-generation technologies, to verify their capabilities and applicability for today's society, and to work in collaboration with industry to ensure their commercialisation.

In March 2021 the TSSG was renamed the Walton Institute in honour of Nobel laureate Ernest Walton who managed to split the atom in the 1930s with John Cockcroft.

In May 2022, the Walton Institute merged with the Institute of Technology, Carlow, six years after they agreed to do so, to form SETU (South East Technological University).

== Specialist Areas ==
There are 5 specialist research areas within the Walton Institute.

=== Agri-Tech ===
The Walton Institute is leading a number of research projects in this area. One example is the €17.5m "DEMETER" project that is looking at creating full interoperability of equipment, sensors and machinery across the agricultural supply chain. The Walton Institute is also part of the Science Foundation Ireland (SFI) VistaMilk research centre that combines basic and applied research in Agri-Tech. Example research includes the development of bio-computing engineered cells that can be used for animal diagnostics, digital modelling of nutrient flows within the human body, and the integration of lightweight AI into novel wireless devices that can be used on the farm. An example of an end-to-end vision for this research is to realise the use of bio-computing modules in animals transmitting animal health information to DEMETER's dedicated software platforms that can then be utilized by various third parties (farmers, vets, pharma companies, consumers).

=== The Brain Initiative ===
This is a multidisciplinary research initiative involving multiple research units. The decision to establish this initiative and pursue this research direction reflects the global importance of the field, which has attracted significant investment in both Europe and the United States. While Brain research has predominantly been driven by Neuroscience, Information and communications technology (ICT) has increasingly played a role in developing new approaches to understanding the functioning of neural systems and diagnosing diseases. The Walton Institute has traditionally been an ICT research centre focused on communication networks and services. This initiative aims to apply theories from traditional communication and networking research to understand communication processes in the brain. This work is primarily focused on developing new solutions to assist patients with neurodegenerative diseases. Another motivation for establishing the initiative is the growing range of connections between the brain and machines.

=== Future Health ===
This area consists of exploration into how Mobile, IOT, Mixed reality, Big Data and AI can transform the healthcare industry are at the forefront of future trends and research efforts in this space. Advancements in technologies are driving research areas and marketable products focused on remote patient care, precision medicine and genomics along with population health management and point-of-care diagnostics. The Walton Institute Future Health Specialist group tracks and guides research efforts across these varying strands.

=== Intelligent Transport Systems ===
This area focuses on the research and innovation in delivering the Cooperative-ITS, which is also known as Vehicle-to-Everything (V2X) communication and has been regarded as the cornerstone for next-generation ITS solutions. Within this area, our research on ITS concentrate on software-defined radio, service and resource management, application for traffic efficiency and safety, and cybersecurity, which have covered most of the protocol stack of V2X from the physical layer to the application layer.

=== Smart Energy ===
In this area the Walton Institute work on smart grid solutions for industry, particularly those that have a degree of flexibility in the timing of their energy use. This is done through modelling their usage profile and isolating the flexibility portion of their energy networks. This facilitates the optimisation of that load against the wholesale energy market and any available onsite generation. Industry can expect energy savings, more use of renewable technologies and reductions in their carbon footprint.

== Horizon 2020 funding ==
To date WIT has competitively secured over €16.6 million during the course of the Horizon 2020 (H2020) funding programme, with €14.8 million competitively won by the Walton Institute research centre. Since the beginning of the H2020 programme in 2014, the Walton Institute have secured funding for 28 ICT projects in the areas of healthcare, intelligent transport, agri-tech and smart energy all with the overarching goal of improving our society of the future as directed by the European Commission. Of the 28 projects secured by the Walton Institute, having a total project value of €168m, 12 of these were co-ordinated by the Walton Institute. Of this total value, €14.8million goes directly to the Walton Institute and the remainder is allocated to each partner on the project positioned throughout Europe.
