= 2009 All-Ireland Senior Camogie Championship =

Camogie championship

All-Ireland Senior Camogie Championship 2009
Championship details
- Dates: 20 June - 13 September 2009
- Teams: 8

All-Ireland champions
- Winners: Cork (24th win)
- Manager: Denise Cronin

All-Ireland runners-up
- Runners-up: Kilkenny
- Captain: Ann Dalton
- Manager: Ann Downey

Championship statistics
- Matches played: 15

The 2009 All-Ireland Senior Camogie Championship—known as the Gala All-Ireland Senior Camogie Championship for sponsorship reasons— was the high point of the 2009 season in the sport of camogie. It commenced on 20 June 2009 and ended with the final on 13 September 2009. Eight teams competed in the Senior Championship out of twenty-seven who competed overall in the Senior, Intermediate and Junior Championships. The final of the 2009 Senior Championship was contested by Cork—the reigning champions—and Kilkenny at Croke Park on 13 September 2009. The final was available to view worldwide. Cork won the game.

== Launch ==
The Championship was launched in Croke Park, Dublin on 10 June 2009. Camogie Association of Ireland President Joan O'Flynn said at the launch that the 2009 Championship would be "the highest profile yet". The Camogie Association also announced the use of county grounds for the first time, with the aim of improving attendances and facilities. This led to some debate on the role of women in sport, with Marie O'Halloran of The Irish Times claiming that female athletes were "still playing second fiddle". Camogie county boards were also undecided whether their players would dress in a skirt or shorts—they presently wear "skorts".

== Summary ==
The eight teams were drawn into two groups of four. Each team played one another once only. The top two in each group contested the semi-finals. Cork went into the 2009 Senior Championship as reigning champions. They began their title challenge by dismissing Dublin. League champions Wexford began their challenge with a game against Limerick in Hospital.

The semi-finals were contested at Nowlan Park, Kilkenny on 15 August 2009. Galway versus Kilkenny and Cork versus Wexford were the semi-finals. Cork and Kilkenny progressed to the final. Kilkenny's victory over Galway was unexpected as 33% of their team was under the age of twenty.

Prior to the final, representatives from both the Minor (Offaly versus Waterford) and Senior Championship finals met President Joan O'Flynn at Croke Park. The teams were named on 10 September 2009. The semi-final between Kilkenny and Galway in which Kilkenny produced a late surge to snatch victory deep in injury-time to qualify for their first final since 2001 was described as “one of the most memorable games ever played in Nowlan Park.” The final between Cork and Kilkenny was played at Croke Park on 13 September 2009 and was broadcast live in Ireland on RTÉ Two and internationally on RTÉ.ie. Highlights were shown on The Sunday Game in Ireland and worldwide on the same channels. Cork were featuring in their eighth consecutive final, whilst Kilkenny last appeared in the final in 2001 when they lost to Tipperary. Kilkenny last won the final in 1995. The teams had met earlier in the Championship in Group 1 when Cork beat Kilkenny by a scoreline of 2–05 to 0-07.

The Gala Performance Award was awarded the player who topped a public poll as having given the season's best performance.

== Fixtures and results ==
=== Group A ===
20 June

Cork	3–21 – 1–6	Dublin

Páirc Uí Rinn, Cork

27 June

Tipperary	1–11 – 1–14	Kilkenny

Semple Stadium, Thurles

11 July

Kilkenny	0–7 – 2–5	Cork

Nowlan Park, Kilkenny

18 July

Tipperary	2–12 – 1–10	Dublin

Parnell Park, Dublin

1 August

Cork	1–13 – 0–14	Tipperary

Páirc Uí Rinn, Cork

1 August

Dublin	0–4 – 2–14	Kilkenny

Ballyboden

Team	Pld	W	D	L	F	A	Diff	Pts
Cork	3	3	0	0	6–39	1–27	+27	6
Kilkenny	3	2	0	1	3–35	3–20	+15	4
Tipperary	3	1	0	2	3–37	3–37	0	2
Dublin	3	0	0	3	2–20	7–47	–42	0

=== Group B ===
20 June

Limerick	0–6 – 5–20	Wexford

Hospital

27 June

Galway	3–17 – 1–4	Clare

Athenry

11 July

Wexford	2–6 – 3–7	Galway

Wexford Park, Wexford

18 July

Clare	2–8 – 1–10	Limerick

Cusack Park, Ennis

1 August

Galway	1–16 – 0–8	Limerick

Athenry

1 August

Clare	0–3 – 2–15	Wexford

Bodyke

Team	Pld	W	D	L	F	A	Diff	Pts
Galway	3	3	0	0	7–40	3–18	+34	6
Wexford	3	2	0	1	9–41	3–16	+43	4
Clare	3	1	0	2	3–15	6–42	–36	2
Limerick	3	0	0	3	1–24	8–44	–41	0

=== Final stages ===
15 August
Semi-Final

Cork	2–13 – 1–10	Wexford

Nowlan Park, Kilkenny

15 August
Semi-Final

Galway	1–11 – 1–13	Kilkenny

Nowlan Park, Kilkenny

13 September 2009
Final
14:00 BST

Cork	0-15 – 0-7	Kilkenny
R Maloney 0-7, G O’Connor 0-3, E Farrell, K Mackey 0-1 each.		A Neary 0-5; A Dalton, M Quilty 0-1 each.

Croke Park, Dublin
Attendance: 25,924
Referee: Una Kearney (Armagh)

Cork	Kilkenny

CORK:
GK	1	Aoife Murray (Cloughduv)
RCB	2	Joanne Callaghan (Cloughduv) (substituted off) 59'
FB	3	Cathriona Foley (Rockbán)
LCB	4	Rena Buckley (Inniscarra)
RWB	5	Jenny Duffy (St Finbarr's)
CB	6	Mary O'Connor (Killeagh)
LWB	7	Sarah Hayes (Courcey Rovers)
MF	8	Briege Corkery (Cloughduv)
MF	9	Orla Cotter (St Catherine's)
RWF	10	Emer O'Sullivan (Ballinhassig) (0-2),
CF	11	Gemma O'Connor (St Finbarr's) (0-3)
LWF	12	Una O'Donoghue (Cloughduv) (0-1) (substituted off) 47'
RCF	13	Sile Burn (Rockbán)
FF	14	Emer Farrell (Sarsfields) (0-1), (substituted off) 37'
LCF	15	Rachel Maloney (Courcey Rovers) (0-7, 6f). (substituted off) 57'
Substitutes:
FF		Katriona Mackey (Douglas) (0-1) for O'Farrell (substituted on) 37'
LWF		Eimear Dillon (Ballygarvan) for O'Donoghue (substituted on) 47'
LCF		Amanda Regan (Douglas) for Moloney (substituted on) 57'
RCB		Linda O'Connell (St Finbarr's) for O'Callaghan (substituted on) 59'

KILKENNY:
GK	1	Caitríona Ryan (Tullogher)
RCB	2	Leann Fennelly (Mullinavat)
FB	3	Catherine Docherty (St Anne's)
LCB	4	Jacqui Frisby (Ballyhale Shamrocks)
RWB	5	Lizzie Lyng (Rower-Innistioge) (substituted off) 37'
CB	6	Amy Butler (Mullinavat)
LWB	7	Elaine Aylward (Mullinavat)
MF	8	Collette Dormer (Paulstown) (0-1) (substituted off) 57'
MF	9	Ann Dalton (St Lachtain's) (0-1)
RWF	10	Therese Muldowney (St Brigid's) (substituted off) 17'
CF	11	Katie Power (Piltown)
LWF	12	Edwina Keane (St Martin's)
RCF	13	Michelle Quilty (Mullinavat) (0-1), (substituted off) 50'
FF	14	Denise Gaule (Windgap)
LCF	15	Aoife Neary (James Stephens) (0-5, 4f, 1 45)
Substitutes:
RWF		Ashling Dunphy (St Brigid's) for Muldowney (substituted on) 17'
RWB		Deidre Delaney (St Lachtain's) for Lyng (substituted on) 37'
RCF		Marie O'Connor (St Lachtain's) for Quilty (substituted on) 50'
MF		Keeva Fennelly (Ballyhale Shamrocks) for Dormer (substituted on) 57'

MATCH RULES

- 60 minutes
- Replay if scores level
- Maximum of 5 substitutions

== Gala Performance awards 2009 ==
Overall winner: Chloe Morey – Clare

- Rachel Maloney – Cork
- Anne Griffin – Dublin
- Jacqui Frisby – Kilkenny
- Una O'Dwyer – Tipperary
- Kate Kelly – Wexford
- Breda Hanney – Galway
- Niamh Mulcahy – Limerick
- Aoife Murray – Cork

== Championship statistics ==
=== Scoring ===
- Widest winning margin: 21 points
  - Wexford 5-20 : 0-6 Limerick
- Most goals in a match: 5
  - Wexford 5-20 : 0-6 Limerick
  - Galway 3-7 : 2-6 Wexford
- Most points in a match: 28
  - Cork 3-21 : 1-7 Dublin
- Most goals by one team in a match: 5
  - Wexford 5-20 : 0-6 Limerick
- Most points by one team in a match: 21
  - Cork 3-21 : 1-7 Dublin

Preceded by All-Ireland Senior Camogie Championship 2008	All-Ireland Senior Camogie Championship; 1932 – present	Succeeded by All-Ireland Senior Camogie Championship 2010
