= Fionnuala Carr =

Personal information
- Native name: Fionnuala Ní Chearra (Irish)
- Born: 3 January 1981 (age 45)

Sport
- Sport: Camogie
- Position: Centre half back
Club
- Years: Club
- Clonduff
College
- Years: College
- University of Ulster Jordanstown
Inter-county
- Years: County
- Down

Fionnuala Carr is an Irish camogie player from Clonduff, County Down. In 2010 and 2011, she won two Soaring Star awards. She also won an Ashbourne All Star in 2011.

Carr was a member of the Down camogie team that contested the 2011 Kay Mills Cup final. Her father, Ross Carr, was an All-Ireland Senior Football Championship medalist in 1991 and 1994. Fionnuala Carr attended the School of the Immaculate Conception, the St Mark's High School Warrenpoint, the University of Ulster Jordanstown and the University of College Cork.
