= Edwina Keane =

Irish camogie player (born 1990)

Personal information
- Native name: Edwina Ní Chatháin (Irish)
- Born: 1990 (age 35–36) Kilkenny, Ireland

Sport
- Sport: Camogie
- Position: Wing forward
Club
- Years: Club
- 2006 – present: St Martin's
Inter-county
- Years: County
- 2006 – present: Kilkenny
Inter-county titles
- All-Irelands: 1
- All Stars: 3

Edwina Keane (born 1990) is a camogie player and student, All Ireland Champion 2016. She played in the 2009 All Ireland camogie final and was a Purcell All Star award winner in 2010. The Leinster 'Young Player of the Year' in 2008, Edwina added the I.T. Tralee 'Sportsperson of the Year' award for the academic year 2008-'09 to her collection. She has won three All- Ireland Minor titles as well as two Under-16s, and Leinster medals in all under-age grades. A National League title-holder from last year. Her senior debut was in 2006.
