= Therese Muldowney =

Personal information
- Native name: Treasa Ní Mhaoldomhnaigh (Irish)
- Born: 1987 (age 38–39) Kilkenny, Ireland

Sport
- Sport: Camogie
- Position: Wing forward
Club*
Years	Club	Apps (scores)
2009 – present	St Brigid's	?
Inter-county**
Years	County	Apps (scores)
2002 – present	Kilkenny	?
- * club appearances and scores correct as of (16:31, 30 December 2009 (UTC)). **Inter County team apps and scores correct as of (16:31, 30 December 2009 (UTC)).

Therese Muldowney (born 1987) is a camogie player and social worker, who played in the 2009 All Ireland camogie final. Therese has won Under-16 and Minor provincial titles with Kilkenny as well as a schools All- Ireland in the Senior 'B' grade. Her brother, Ciarán, is a well-known trainer and club player with Conahy Shamrocks, and she made her senior debut in 2009.
