= Áine Lyng =

Irish camogie player (born 1988)

Personal information
- Native name: Áine Ní Loinn (Irish)
- Born: 1988 (age 37–38) Waterford, Ireland

Sport
- Sport: Camogie
- Position: Centre half forward
Club*
Years	Club	Apps (scores)
2007 – present	Gall Tir	?
Inter-county**
Years	County	Apps (scores)
2002 – present	Waterford	?
- * club appearances and scores correct as of (16:31, 30 December 2009 (UTC)). **Inter County team apps and scores correct as of (16:31, 30 December 2009 (UTC)).

Áine Lyng (born 1988) is a camogie player and sport science student. She won a Soaring Star award in 2009 and played in the 2009 All Ireland junior camogie final. Áine has been nominated for a senior All Star four times and has won Gael Linn medals with Munster in both Junior (as captain) and Senior. Won an All-Ireland medal with Mercy College and three and a Colleges All Stars while playing for U.L. She holds National League, Under-16 All-Ireland, Munster Junior and Intermediate medals with Waterford. At club level she captured county medals in Under-14, Under-16, Under-18 and Senior (two), as well as an All-Ireland sevens title from 2007.
