= Susan Earner =

Irish camogie player

Personal information
- Native name: Siobhán Ní Shaolaigh (Irish)
- Born: 1985 or 1986 (age 40–41) County Galway, Ireland

Sport
- Sport: Camogie
- Position: Goalkeeper
Club
- Years: Club
- Meelick–Eyrecourt
Inter-county titles
- All-Irelands: 1
- All Stars: 2

Susan Eaner (born 1985 or 1986) is an Irish camogie player who played with the Galway senior inter-county team. She won a Camogie All Stars Award in 2011 and an All-Ireland Senior Camogie Championship medal with Galway in 2013. She became the first female manager of the Offaly senior camogie team.

== Early life and education ==
Susan Earner was born in Clonfert, County Galway. She attended St Rynagh's Community College in nearby Banagher, County Offaly and captaining the school team to the 2004 All Ireland Colleges Camogie Championship. She later attended NUI Galway. She qualified as a secondary school teacher and, as of 2010, was working as a French teacher at a secondary school in County Meath.

== Sporting career ==
At underage levels, Earner won an All-Ireland Minor Camogie Championship (U16) medal in 2000, a junior medal in 2003, and an All-Ireland Intermediate Camogie Championship medal in 2004. She also holds an All Ireland Colleges Camogie Championship (schools) medal.

Earner made her debut for the senior Galway camogie team in 2005. Playing as a goalkeeper, she had a "lengthy career with Galway", and was a member of the senior squad during the 2010, 2011, and 2013 All-Ireland Senior Camogie Championship competitions. She won Camogie All Star Awards in 2011 and 2013.

After retiring as a player, she won the women's All-Ireland Poc Fada Championship title in 2017, and again in 2018.

She subsequently became the first female manager of the Offaly senior camogie team. Earner retired from that role in 2022.

== See also ==
- Meelick–Eyrecourt GAA
