= Anne Dalton =

Irish camogie player

Personal information
- Native name: Áine Ní Dhaltúin (Irish)
- Born: 22 May 1988 (age 38) Kilkenny, Ireland

Sport
- Sport: Camogie
- Position: Centre field
Club
- Years: Club
- St. Lachtain's
Club titles
- All-Ireland Titles: 3
Inter-county
- Years: County
- 2006 – 2021: Kilkenny
Inter-county titles
- All-Irelands: 1
- All Stars: 5

Anne Dalton (born 22 May 1988; legally spelled Ann Dalton) is a camogie player. She was an All-Ireland winning medalist in 2016, and won five camogie All Star awards in 2009, 2010, 2014, 2016 and 2017. She played in the 2009 All Ireland camogie final.

== Career ==
An Ashbourne Cup medal-winner with Waterford IT in 2009, 2010, and 2011 she has won All-Ireland Minor and National League titles with Kilkenny. Described as a "stylish captain" in the programme notes for the 2009 All Ireland final she has collected three All-Irelands in succession 2004, 2005, and 2006, four Leinsters and six county crowns with her club St. Lachtain's, and has provincial titles at inter-county level in Under-14, Under-16 (three) and Under-18 (four). Her senior debut was in 2007.

Dalton retired from inter-county in early 2021.

== Media ==
Dalton was the subject of a 2023 Laochra Gael episode.
