= Stacey Redmond =

Personal information
- Native name: Stáis Ní Réamoinn (Irish)
- Born: 11 October 1988 (age 38) Wexford, Ireland

Sport
- Sport: Camogie
- Position: Forward
Club*
Years	Club	Apps (scores)
	Oulart–The Ballagh	?
Inter-county**
Years	County	Apps (scores)
	Wexford	?
- * club appearances and scores correct as of (16:31, 30 June 2011 (UTC)). **Inter County team apps and scores correct as of (16:31, 30 June 2011 (UTC)).

Stacey Redmond is a camogie player, and All-Ireland Senior medal with Wexford in All-Ireland Senior Camogie Championship in and a member of the panel who won the 2010 National League before injury deprived her of a chance to participate in Wexford’s 2010 and 2011 All Ireland championship victories. She returned to the inter-county panel in 2011 and was a susbsitute for the 2011 final.

== Other honours ==
All Ireland club championship with Oulart the Ballagh 2011/2012 and player of the match. All-Ireland Senior medalist with Wexford 2007, 2011. National League Division one and Division two 2009; Ashbourne Cup with WIT 2009, 2010, 2011; Ashbourne All Star and Player of the Tournament 2009; four All-Ireland Féile na nGael 1999, 2000, 2001, 2002; Leinster Under-14 2002 (captain); Leinster Under-16 2002; Leinster and winner of All-Ireland Senior medals in Colleges with {http://www.colaistebride.ie/|Coláiste Bríde] 2003, 2004, 2005; All-Ireland Junior Colleges with Coláiste Bríde 2004; Club Senior 2003, 2004, 2005, 2006, 2007, 2009; Leinster Club Senior 2009; All Ireland club sevens 2006; Leinster Senior 2007. Stacey had the misfortune to break an ankle in a club game on the day after the National League success of 2010 and was unavailable for the All Ireland victories of 2010 and 2011.

== Family background ==
Stacey is sister of Wexford Senior hurler, David Redmond.
