= Katrina Mackey =

Personal information
- Native name: Caitríona Ní Mhaca (Irish)
- Born: 1992 (age 33–34) Cork, Ireland

Sport
- Sport: Camogie
- Position: Full Forward
Club
- Years: Club
- 2009 – present: Douglas
Inter-county
- Years: County
- 2009 – present: Cork
Inter-county titles
- All-Irelands: 7
- All Stars: 8

Katrina Mackey (born 1992 in Cork) is a camogie player and scientist. Winner of All Ireland Camogie medals in 2009, 2014, 2015, 2017, 2018, 2023 and 2024. All Stars award winner in 2012, 2014, 2016, 2017, 2018, 2022, 2023 and 2024. She is twin sister of Pamela, who is also on the Cork camogie panel, she won a Munster championship and an All Ireland, coming on as a sub, in her first season on the panel. She was also a member of the Cork Minor squad in 2009. Holds Féile na nGael All-Ireland medals with her club, Douglas, as well as Senior county championship honours and a host of under-age titles, including All-Ireland Colleges with Christ The King, Turner's Cross.
