= Mary Immaculate College =

College in Limerick, Ireland

Coordinates: 52°39′11″N 8°38′22″W

Mary Immaculate College, University of Limerick
- Coláiste Mhuire gan Smál (Irish)
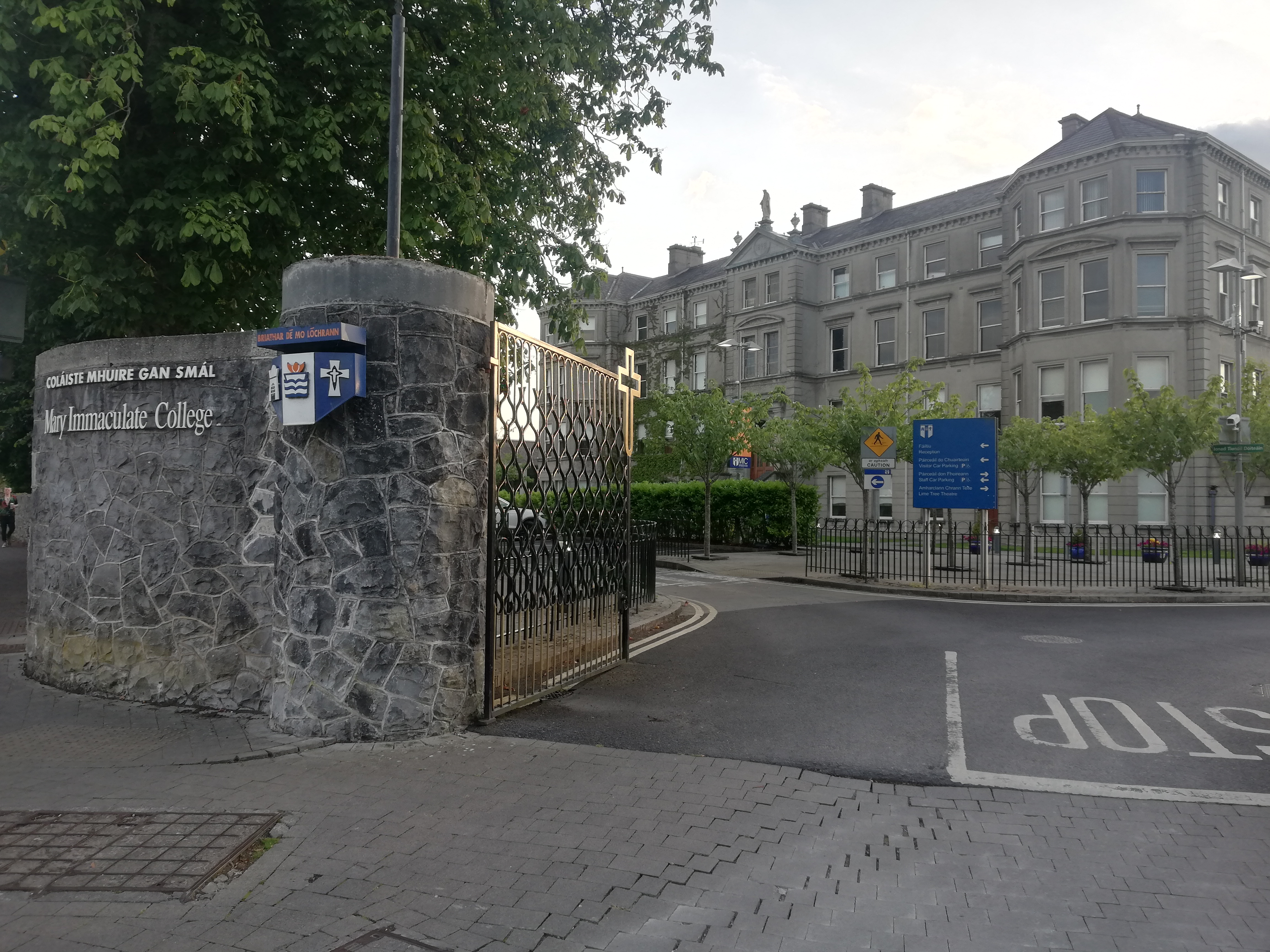
- Main entrance
- Motto: Briathar Dé Mo Lóchrann
- Motto in English: The Word of God [as] my light
- Type: College of Education
- Established: 1898
- Founder: Edward Thomas O'Dwyer
- Parent institution: University of Limerick
- Affiliations: ACCU; ICUSTA
- Religious affiliation: Roman Catholic
- Academic affiliations: National University of Ireland (1974–1994); University of Limerick (1991–present)
- President: Professor Dermot Nestor (2024–present)
- Students: 5,000
- Location: South Circular Road, Limerick, Ireland
- Language: English, Irish
- Campus locations: Limerick and Thurles
- Colours: Blue and Orange
- Nickname: Mary I
- Website: mic.ul.ie

Mary Immaculate College (Irish: Coláiste Mhuire gan Smál), also known as MIC and Mary I, is a college of education and liberal arts in Limerick, Ireland. Founded in 1898, the university-level college of education and the liberal arts is academically linked with the University of Limerick. The multi-campus college offers both undergraduate programmes and a number of postgraduate programmes at Diploma, MA and PhD level. As of 2019, the college had a student population of over 5,000.

== History ==
=== Foundation and expansion ===
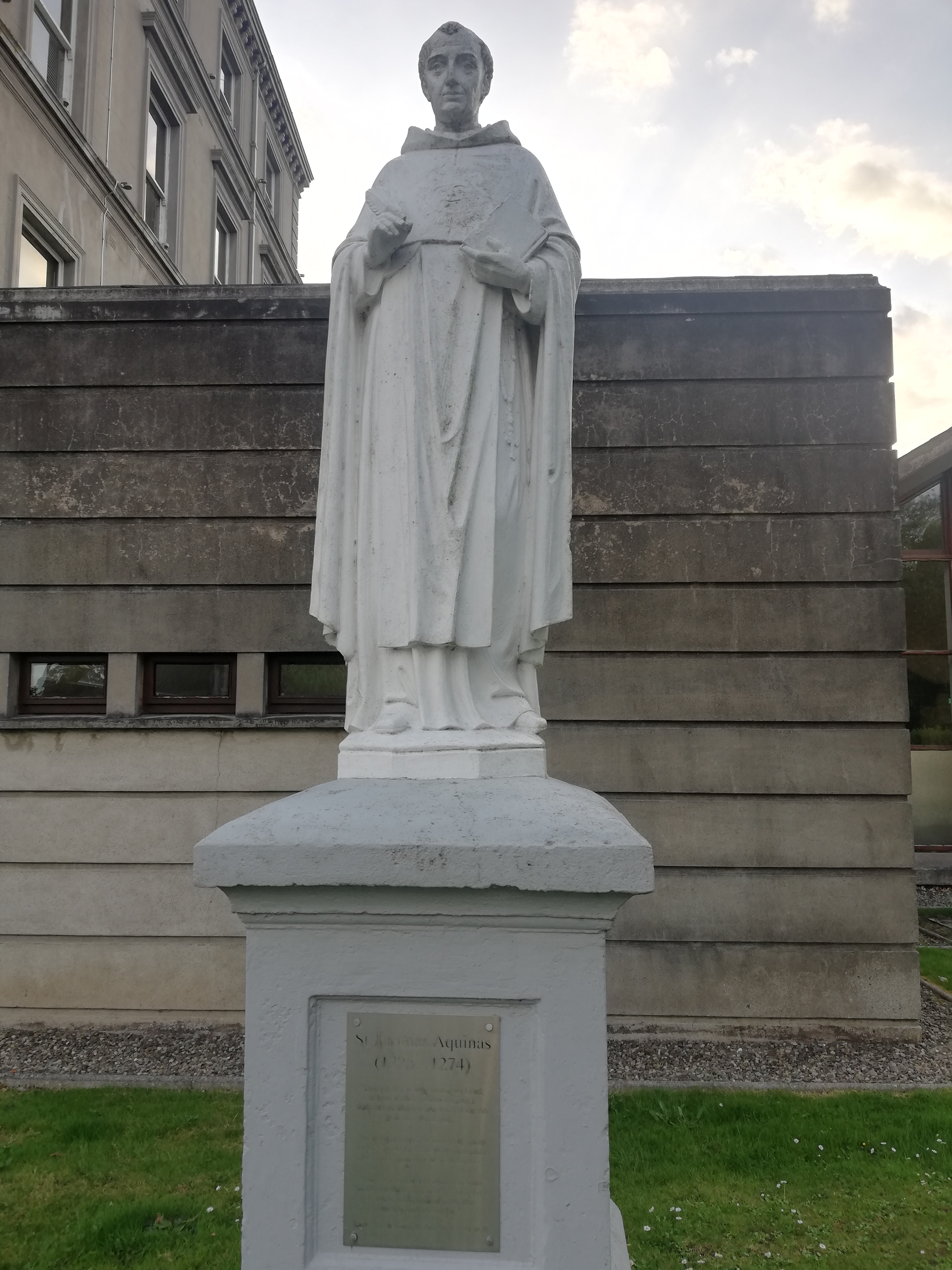
Statue of Thomas Aquinas on campus

The college was established as a dedicated primary teacher training college for female teachers in 1898 by Bishop Edward Thomas O'Dwyer, Roman Catholic Bishop of Limerick and the Sisters of Mercy.

Its foundation stone was laid on 8 December 1898 and the college officially opened in 1902, accepting female students from Munster.

The college accepted male students for the first time in 1969. With a new curriculum in 1971, a number of major changes were initiated with teacher training in Ireland.

1974 saw the commencement of the three year B.Ed. degree with the first graduates in 1977, the course, like in other teacher training colleges, was previously a two-year National Teachers Diploma). From 1974 to 1994, Mary Immaculate College was a recognised college of the National University of Ireland. Due to a drop in the demand for school teachers, in the 1980s under Sr O'Connor and Sr Bulgers presidencies, the college diversified into non-education arts programmes, and began to initiate links with other international universities. Evening programmes were delivered with diplomas in computer studies, catechetics, and philosophy (awarded by NUI).

Following the granting of university status to NIHE Limerick in 1989, Mary Immaculate (as did Thomond College) began talks about a more formal relationship with UL. In 1991, the college became affiliated to the University of Limerick, with new Liberal Arts Programmes being offered by MIC. Degrees were awarded by the NUI until 1994, from 1995 degrees were conferred by UL.

2003 saw the first PhD awarded by Mary Immaculate.

=== Later developments ===
MIC has undergone significant growth and development in recent decades with the overall student population witnessing a tenfold increase since 1992. This growth has brought with it a significant expansion and broadening of MIC's academic provision, as well as a re-development of the campus which now offers teaching, learning and research facilities as well as events and conferencing facilities. In 2016, MIC expanded its geographical footprint following the incorporation of St Patrick's College in Thurles, another well-established college, offering four degree programmes preparing students to become second-level teachers.

Following the incorporation of St. Patrick's College, Thurles, MIC became a multi-campus institution offering 13 undergraduate degree programmes in Education and the Liberal Arts, as well as Continuing Professional Development offerings for teachers and numerous postgraduate opportunities to Masters and PhD level. Also in 2016, a consortium, led by MIC, was awarded the contract from the Higher Education Authority for the delivery of the National Higher Education Programme for Inclusion Coordinators in Early Years Settings.

Foundation building at Mary Immaculate College

A December 2020 report noted that Mary Immaculate College had spent €34,140 on investigating sexual harassment, together with €2,152 on legal fees.

== Programmes ==
MIC offers 13 undergraduate degree programmes across both campuses. In 2022, the college announced the launch of a new Bachelor of Science in psychology (MI003), a four-year, full-time, honours degree level 8 programme that provides students with an undergraduate education in psychology and includes learning in the workplace. The programme content prepares graduates for a range of careers while giving them the necessary psychological knowledge to pursue postgraduate studies in psychology.

The Bachelor of Arts (MI002) is a four-year degree programme with three years on campus and one year on work placement and/or study abroad. The degree is flexible and includes subject choices such as English, Geography and History, to newer subjects such as Drama & Theatre Studies, Media & Communication Studies or Psychology. There is also a four-year BA in Contemporary and Applied Theatre Studies (MI001).

On the MIC Thurles Campus there are a number of post-primary teacher education degrees in areas such as Business Studies, Accounting, Gaeilge, Religious Studies, Mathematics and Home Economics. The programmes offered include the BA in Education, Business Studies & Accounting (MI016); BA in Education, Business Studies & Religious Studies (MI017); BA in Education, Gaeilge & Religious Studies (MI018); BA in Education, Gaeilge & Business Studies (MI019); BA in Education, Mathematics & Gaeilge (MI020); the BA in Education, Mathematics & Business Studies (MI021) and the BA in Education, Home Economics & Business Studies (MI022).

MIC also offers postgraduate programmes to doctoral level in Education and the Liberal Arts, Continuing Professional Development (CPD) courses and several access and inclusion pathways. MIC also offers funding supports through a Departmental Assistantships Scheme and merit-based Research Masters and Doctoral Awards Schemes.

== Student composition ==
Close on 10% of students on campus are mature students, a relatively high figure when compared to other third level institutions. The college, in addition to catering for mature students, also offers special entry to disadvantaged students, students with disabilities, refugees, members of ethnic minorities, and Travellers. MIC also offers Continuing Professional Development (CPD) courses and other tailored programmes for adult learners.

Through its Erasmus and student exchange programmes, the college also has an overseas complement in its student body. Students come from England, Wales, France, Germany, Austria, Switzerland, Spain, Nigeria, Italy, Sudan, Sweden, Finland, Latvia, Poland, Lithuania, China, United States, Indonesia, Norway, Denmark, Ghana, Zimbabwe, and Iceland.

The MIC Limerick grounds also has includes property on Mount Convent, a former Sisters of Mercy convent on O'Connell Avenue, Limerick, where it houses postgraduate students.

== Culture and media ==
=== Wired 99.9FM ===
The college is home to a radio station, Wired 99.9FM, Limerick's only student radio station with a broadcast licence. The station is run in partnership with another Limerick college, Technological University of the Shannon (TUS).

=== Lime Tree Theatre ===
Mary Immaculate College is also the location of the 510-seat theatre known as the Lime Tree Theatre. It was officially opened on 30 October 2012. The venue hosts a range of performances, including theatre, music, comedy, traditional arts, schools' performances and conferences.

== Notable alumni ==
- Cathal Crowe, politician
- Alphonsus Cullinan, Bishop of Waterford & Lismore
- Jim Daly TD, Fine Gael politician
- John Gunning, sports journalist working in Japan
- Una Healy, member of The Saturdays (left in first year to pursue music career)
- Jacqui Hurley, RTÉ sports presenter
- Tony Killeen, politician
- Micheál Lehane, journalist
- Pat McDonagh, Supermac's founder
- Roisin Meaney, bestselling author
- Madeline Mulqueen, Irish model
- Hildegarde Naughton, Politician
- Síle Ní Chéileachair, short story writer
- Patrick O'Donovan, Minister for Further and Higher Education, Research, Innovation & Science
- Páidí Ó Lionáird, TG4 presenter
- Dáithí Ó Sé, RTÉ presenter
- Orla O'Shea, former Rose of Tralee
- Máirín Quill, politician

=== Sports ===
- Cathal Barrett, Tipperary hurler & All Ireland winner
- Naomi Carroll, field hockey player
- Conor Cooney, Galway hurler and Allstar winner
- Heather Cooney Galway camogie player
- Richie English, Limerick hurler & All Ireland winner
- Mark Foley, former Limerick hurler
- Aaron Gillane, Limerick hurler & All Ireland winner
- Ciara Griffin, former Irish Rugby Captain
- Declan Hannon, Limerick hurler & All Ireland winner
- Séamus Kennedy, Tipperary hurler & All Ireland winner
- Cian Lynch, Limerick hurler & All Ireland winner
- Brendan Maher, Tipperary hurler & All Ireland winner
- Ronan Maher, Tipperary hurler & All Ireland winner
- Shane McGrath, Tipperary hurler and Allstar winner
- Thomas Monaghan, Galway hurler
- Niamh Mulcahy, Limerick camogie player and Allstar winner
- Juliet Murphy, Cork footballer & multiple All Ireland winner
- Dara Ó Cinnéide, former Kerry Gaelic footballer; TG4 presenter
- Darragh O'Donovan, Limerick hurler
- Niall O'Meara, Tipperary hurler & All Ireland winner
- Tomás Ó Sé, former Kerry Gaelic footballer
- David Reidy, Limerick hurler
- Roisin Upton, field hockey player

== Presidents of Mary Immaculate College ==
Since its founding in 1898, the Sisters of Mercy presided over the college up until 1999. The term principal was used for the position of head of the college in earlier years.

- Sr. Mary Paul Quinlan (1901–1923) first principal of the college.
- Sr. Mary Veronica (1923-1945) she served as vice-principal to Sr. Quinlan.
- Sr. Celsus Barry (1945-1952)
- Sr. Rosalie Loughnane (1952-1959)
- Sr. Loreto (Eileen) O'Connor CSM, BA, HDipEd, MA (1959-1979)
- Sr. M. Cabriní Moloney (Siúr Carbriní Ni Mhaoldomhnaigh) CSM
- Sr. Angela Bulger BA, HDipEd, MA, HonDLitt(1988-1999)
- Prof. Peadar Cremin (1999-2011)
- Rev Prof. Michael A Hayes (2011-2017)
- Prof. Eugene Wall (2018-2024)
- Prof. Dermot Nestor (2024-)

== Partner institutions ==
In addition to institutions throughout Europe, the college exchanges students and staff yearly with the following colleges and universities:

- St. John's University, New York, New York
- Gannon University, Erie, Pennsylvania
- Frostburg State University, Maryland
- Regis University, Denver
- Loyola University, Chicago
- University of St. Thomas, Houston
- Longwood University, Virginia
- Thomas More College, Kentucky
- Salve Regina, Rhode Island
- Le Moyne College, Syracuse, New York
- University of Turku, Turku, Finland
- Australian Catholic University, Melbourne
- Université Blaise Pascal, Clermont-Ferrand, France
- West Chester University, West Chester, Pennsylvania
