= Katie Power (camogie) =

Kilkenny camogie player

Personal information
- Native name: Cáit de Paor (Irish)
- Born: November 20, 1991 (age 34) Kilkenny, Ireland

Sport
- Sport: Camogie
- Position: Centre half forward
Club
- Years: Club
- 2006-Present: Piltown
Club titles
- Kilkenny titles: 1
Inter-county
- Years: County
- 2006-Present: Kilkenny
Inter-county titles
- All-Irelands: 3
- All Stars: 4

Katie Power (born 20 November 1991) is an All-Ireland- and All Star-winning camogie player who plays for Piltown and Kilkenny.

== Background ==
The daughter of former Piltown hurler Jim, and former Piltown camogie player Martina (née Brennan), and sister to Martin and Jamie, Power played camogie from a very young age. She was first tutored by her father, and later by Maura Brennan and Jim Malone.

Katie also participated in athletics, soccer, basketball and Gaelic football as a child but her love for hurling persuaded her to focus on camogie in recent years.

== Camogie career ==
Power earned her first Leinster medal with Kilkenny at U14 in 2003.

Katie made her debut on the Kilkenny Senior team in 2006 and currently fills the position of centre forward.

In July 2017, Katie's brother Martin won an All-Ireland medal playing in the full forward position on the Kilkenny Intermediate Hurling team.

== Roll of honour ==
Kilkenny GAA

- All-Ireland Senior Camogie Championship (3): 2016, 2020, 2022
- Runner-up: 2009, 2013, 2014, 2017, 2018, 2019
- National Camogie League (6): 2008, 2014, 2016, 2017, 2018, 2021
- Runner-up: 2010, 2019

Piltown GAA

- Kilkenny Senior Camogie Championship (1): 2024
- All-Ireland Intermediate Club Camogie Championship (1): 2015
- Leinster Intermediate Club Camogie Championship (1): 2014
- Kilkenny Intermediate Camogie Championship (1): 2014
- Kilkenny Junior Camogie Championship (1): 2008

Waterford IT

- Ashbourne Cup (4): 2010, 2011, 2012, 2013
- All-Ireland Minor Camogie Championship (3): 2006, 2007, 2008
- All-Ireland Under-16 Camogie Championship (2): 2005, 2006
- Gael Linn Cup (1): 2010

== Leinster titles ==
- 11 Senior (2006, 2008, 2009, 2015, 2017, 2018, 2019, 2022, 2023, 2024, 2025)
- 1 Intermediate club title (2014)
- 3 Minor (2006, 2007, 2008)
- 2 Under-16 (2005, 2006)
- 2 Under-14 (2003, 2004)

== Individual honours ==
- 1 Young Player of the Year (2005)
- 4 Camogie All Stars Awards (2009, 2013, 2017, 2018)
- 4 Ashbourne All Star Awards (2011, 2012, 2013, 2014)
- 12 All Stars nominations

(2009, 2010, 2012, 2013, 2014, 2015, 2016, 2017, 2018, 2019, 2022, 2025)
