= Collette Dormer =

Irish camogie player

Personal information
- Native name: Collette Ní Dhuidhíorma (Irish)
- Born: 1989 (age 36–37) Kilkenny, Ireland

Sport
- Sport: Camogie
- Position: Centre field
Club
- Years: Club
- 2006 – present: Paulstown
Inter-county
- Years: County
- 2006 – present: Kilkenny
Inter-county titles
- All-Irelands: 2
- All Stars: 2

Collette Dormer is a camogie player and student, who played in the 2009 All Ireland camogie final.

== Career ==
An Ashbourne All Star in 2009 and 2010, two years in which she helped Waterford IT to glory, she has also won a Division 1 Colleges league medal to her collection. She has won Under-16, Minor (two) and Intermediate All-Ireland medals. Her senior debut was in 2006. She also played a large role in helping the Kilkenny team reaching the All-Ireland Senior final in 2013 but was unlucky on the day. She returned to colleges camogie for 2014 Ashbourne. She played an unfamiliar role at full back helping the team to the Ashourne Cup Final where they narrowly missed out to U.L. Collette collected her 4th Ashbourne All-Star, with 4 Ashbourne Medals.

== Family ==
Her brother, Stephen, who trained the Kilkenny Under-16 team in 2009, was joint manager of the year for 2008 along with Liam Dunne.

Stephen after helping Kildare camogie in their All-Ireland glory in 2013, he now manages the team for the 2014 campaign.
