= Katrina Parrock =

Irish camogie player

Personal information
- Native name: Caitríona Ní Pharróg (Irish)
- Born: 2 September 1990 (age 36) Wexford, Ireland

Sport
- Sport: Camogie
- Position: Right corner forward
Club*
Years	Club	Apps (scores)
	St Ibar’s Shelmalier	?
Inter-county**
Years	County	Apps (scores)
	Wexford	?
Inter-county titles
- All-Irelands: 3
- All Stars: 1
- * club appearances and scores correct as of (16:31, 30 Sept 2011 (UTC)). **Inter County team apps and scores correct as of (16:31, 30 Sept 2011 (UTC)).

Katrina Parrock (born 2 September 1990) is an Irish camogie player, winner of All-Ireland Senior medals in 2007, 2010, 2011 and 2012 and an All Star award winner in 2010, 2011 and 2012. She was an All Star nominee in 2006, 2007 and 2009 and a member of the Team of the Championship for 2011.

Also an accomplished association footballer, she played for Wexford Youths of the Women's National League (WNL) from 2017 until 2019, scoring the winning goal in the 2018 FAI Women's Cup final.

== Other awards ==
National Camogie League medals in 2009, 2010 and 2011; Leinster Championship 2007, 2010, 2011; Leinster Under-14 2002; Leinster Under-14 2002; Leinster Senior 2007; Club Senior 'B' 2007 (with St. Martin's); Ashbourne Cup 2010; Ashbourne All Star 2010; Ashbourne Cup player of the tournament 2010 and 2011.

== Family background ==
Katrina's grandfather, Jack Cullen, was a dual Wexford Minor in the 1950s before emigrating to England. She is a first cousin once removed of Tony 'Sack' Walsh, Wexford's Senior hurling full-back in the 1980s.

== Other sports ==
Katrina played hockey and soccer at representative levels.

=== Soccer ===
Katrina Parrock
Personal information
- Date of birth: 2 September 1990 (age 36)
- Place of birth: Wexford, Ireland

Youth career
- Rosslare Rangers

Senior career*
Years	Team	Apps	(Gls)
- Kilmore United
2017–2019	Wexford Youths		
2020–	Terenure Rangers		

International career^{‡}
2006	Republic of Ireland U19	1	(0)
- * Club domestic league appearances and goals as of 15:13, 26 December 2021 (UTC) ‡ National team caps and goals as of 15:13, 26 December 2021 (UTC)

Parrock made her debut for the Republic of Ireland women's national under-19 football team in August 2006, as a 14-year-old player with Rosslare Rangers of the Wexford League. In October 2006 she was selected for the Republic of Ireland women's national under-17 football team as a Kilmore United player.

In 2017 Parrock had tired of camogie and decided to "step back" from inter-county competition. She accepted an offer to join Wexford Youths in June 2017, after being inspired by watching the club's 2015 FAI Women's Cup final win at the Aviva Stadium on television. Although she had continued to play soccer with Kilmore United to maintain fitness in the camogie off-seasons, she had to undertake intensive training to meet the higher standard at Wexford Youths.

In 2018 Parrock helped Wexford Youths secure a domestic "treble", being named Player of the Match and scoring the only goal in the FAI Women's Cup final win over Peamount United at the Aviva Stadium. In January 2019 she signed for Wexford Youths for another season. She did not remain for the delayed 2020 season, seeking a new challenge elsewhere.

Parrock expressed irritation after sexist trolling facilitated by the Hogan Stand website came to her attention in August 2020. At that stage she was playing for Dublin non-League club Terenure Rangers. The material related to an incident seven years previously, whereupon Parrock's physical attractiveness came to national attention when she appeared on television in some denim shorts while nursing a broken arm and serving as Wexford camogie's water girl. After a dalliance with playing rugby union, Parrock returned to the Wexford senior camogie panel in May 2021.

=== Soccer honours ===
Wexford Youths

- Women's National League: 2017, 2018
- FAI Women's Cup: 2018, 2019
