= Colette McSorley =

Collette McSorley
Personal information
- Native name: Nicoilín Níc Somhairle (Irish)
- Born: 1989 (age 36–37) Armagh, Northern Ireland

Sport
- Sport: Camogie
- Position: Centre half forward
Club*
| Years | Club | Apps (scores) |
| | Tullysarron | ? |
Inter-county**
| Years | County | Apps (scores) |
| | Armagh | ? |
- * club appearances and scores correct as of (16:31, 30 June 2010 (UTC)). **Inter County team apps and scores correct as of (16:31, 30 June 2010 (UTC)).

Collette McSorley is a camogie player, national Young Player of the Year award winner in 2005, the first Armagh camogie player to win a major national award in the sport, and winner of a Soaring Star Award in 2011 and nominated for another in 2016.

She was Ulster Young Player of the Year in 2004. She captained Queen's University Belfast to Purcell Cup glory in 2011, and was a recipient of 4 Queen's University Blues awards from 2008 to 2011. She was also part of the County Armagh teams that achieved the All-Ireland Nancy Murray crown in 2006 and 2011.

She played in full forward in Croke Park in the 2016 All-Ireland Final, where Armagh where overcome by Carlow. Colette was a dual player for Armagh in 2006-07 representing the county in both codes of Camogie and Ladies Football.

== Career ==
She is a prolific scorer for Armagh and for Queen's University Belfast camogie teams. When played for Ireland in the camogie-shinty international in 2009 she won the player of the match award.
