= Karen Kelly =

Irish camogie player (born 1983)

Personal information
- Native name: Cáit Ní Cheallaigh (Irish)
- Born: 1983 (age 42–43) Waterford, Ireland

Sport
- Sport: Camogie
- Position: Full forward
Club*
Years	Club	Apps (scores)
2001 – present	St Anne’s	?
Club titles
- Waterford titles: 6
Inter-county**
Years	County	Apps (scores)
2001 – present	Waterford	?
- * club appearances and scores correct as of (16:31, 30 December 2009 (UTC)). **Inter County team apps and scores correct as of (16:31, 30 December 2009 (UTC)).

Karen Kelly is a camogie player and teacher, winner of two Soaring Star awards in 2009 and 2011 and played in the 2009 All Ireland junior camogie final. The leading scorer in her side's impressive march to the final, Karen has won two National League medals, Munster titles in the Junior and Intermediate grades, as well as six Senior county championships with a club. With a total of 4-38 she was the highest scoring player in the Kay Mills Cup of 2011.
