= Denise Gaule =

Personal information
- Native name: Denís Nic an Ghaill (Irish)
- Born: 1991 (age 34–35) Kilkenny, Ireland

Sport
- Sport: Camogie
- Position: Full forward
Club
- Years: Club
- 2009 – present: Windgap
Inter-county
- Years: County
- 2009 – present: Kilkenny
Inter-county titles
- All-Irelands: 3
- All Stars: 7

Denise Gaule (born 1991) is a camogie player and student. The winner of the Young Player of the Year award of 2009, she played in the 2009 All Ireland camogie final. She came to public attention during the 2009 All-Ireland semi-final against Galway when she scored three fine points, just one week after helping Kilkenny to yet another All-Ireland Minor title, and her second in the grade. She also holds two All-Ireland Senior colleges medals and won an All-Ireland Intermediate crown of 2008 when she was declared player of the match in the final.
