= Leann Fennelly =

Irish camogie player (born 1990)

Personal information
- Native name: Leannán Ní Fhionnalaigh (Irish)
- Born: 1990 (age 35–36) Kilkenny, Ireland

Sport
- Sport: Camogie
- Position: Corner back
Club*
Years	Club	Apps (scores)
2007 – present	Mullinavat	?
Inter-county**
Years	County	Apps (scores)
2007 – present	Kilkenny	?
- * club appearances and scores correct as of (16:31, 30 December 2009 (UTC)). **Inter County team apps and scores correct as of (16:31, 30 December 2009 (UTC)).

Leann Fennelly (born 1990) is a camogie player and a student, who played in the 2009 All Ireland camogie final.

== Background ==
Leann's father, Liam, gave distinguished service to Kilkenny in the forward line, whereas she has shown her mettle in the backs. Her father and six of his brothers played together to win the 1989 Leinster Senior Club Hurling Championship and four (Kevin, Seán, Ger and Liam) played together in the All Ireland hurling final of 1987. Her father's cousin Mary captained the 1976 Kilkenny All Ireland team and served as President of the Camogie Association.

== Career ==
She already has six All-Ireland medals in her collection – one Under-16, three Minor, one Colleges and one Intermediate from 2008. Her senior debut was in 2009.
