= Michelle Quilty =

Camogie player (born 1990)

Personal information
- Native name: Michelle Ní Chaoilte (Irish)
- Nickname: Quilt
- Born: 1990 (age 35–36) Kilkenny, Ireland

Sport
- Sport: Camogie
- Position: Corner forward/Wing Forward
Club
- Years: Club
- 2008 – present: Mullinavat
Inter-county
- Years: County
- 2008 – present: Kilkenny
Inter-county titles
- All-Irelands: 1
- All Stars: 2

Michelle Quilty is a camogie player. She played in the 2009 All-Ireland Senior Camogie Championship Final and was a member of the Team of the Championship for 2011. With a total of 5-26 she was the fourth highest scoring player in the Championship in 2011.

== Career & Honours ==
She was an Ashbourne Cup and league medal-winner with Waterford IT in 2009. Michelle's brother, Martin, is Chairman of the Co. Camogie Board. She won two Under-16 and two Minor All-Irelands, along with a National League in 2008 and Leinster honours in Under-16 (two), Minor (three) and Senior (two).
