= MTU Kerry GAA =

Gaelic games club in County Kerry, Ireland

Munster Technological University Kerry GAA
- CLG Ollscoil Teicneolaíochta na Mumhan, Ciarraí
- Founded: 1977
- County: Kerry
- Colours: Sky blue and navy
- Grounds: North Campus, Tralee

Playing kits
Standard colours

Munster Technological University Kerry GAA or MTU Kerry GAA is the GAA team located in the Munster Technological University, Tralee, County Kerry, Ireland. They play Gaelic football, hurling, ladies' Gaelic football and camogie.

== Gaelic football ==
The football club competes in the Sigerson Cup and Higher Education Leagues as well as the McGrath Cup. The Ladies football team play in the O'Connor Cup and Higher Education Leagues.

=== History ===
MTU Kerry (formerly known as IT Tralee and Tralee RTC) made a mark on the college GAA scene in 1997 when it became the first RTC to win the Sigerson Cup. It was only Tralee's second outing in this competition. However, the college created further history by winning the Sigerson three times in successive seasons to become the only RTC/Institute of Technology to do so in the competition's history.

The Ladies football team also won the O'Connor Cup back to back in 1998 and 1999.

=== Winning Sigerson Cup captains ===
- Éamon Ferris 1997
- Michael Cloherty 1998
- Jim McGuinness 1999

=== Notable footballers ===
- Colm Cooper
- Michael Donnellan
- Noel Garvan
- Pádraic Joyce
- Tom McLoughlin
- Seamus Moynihan
- Colm Parkinson
- Mike Frank Russell

== Hurling ==
The hurling club play in the Ryan Cup and Higher Education Leagues and the Waterford Crystal Cup.

=== History ===
MTU Kerry won the Ryan Cup in 1997, 2007, 2011. The camogie team won the Purcell Shield in 1997.

=== Honours ===
Competition	Wins	Years won
Sigerson Cup	3	1997, 1998, 1999
Ryan Cup	3	1997, 2007, 2011

=== Notable hurlers ===
- James O'Brien
- Nicky Quaid

== Camogie ==
The camogie team play in the Purcell Shield.
