= Niamh Mulcahy =

Irish camogie and soccer player (born 1990)

Personal information
- Native name: Niamh Ní Mhaolchatha (Irish)
- Born: 4 January 1990 (age 36) Ahane, County Limerick, Ireland

Sport
- Sport: Camogie
- Position: Left half forward
Club*
Years	Club	Apps (scores)
	Ahane	?
Inter-county**
Years	County	Apps (scores)
	Limerick	?
- * club appearances and scores correct as of (16:31, 30 June 2010 (UTC)). **Inter County team apps and scores correct as of (16:31, 30 June 2010 (UTC)).

Niamh Mulcahy (born 4 January 1990) is a camogie player, winner of the Young Player of the Year award in 2007. She was player of the match when Limerick won the All Ireland Senior B championship in 2007 on a team managed by Ciarán Carey, having secured a replay for Limerick with a long-range free in the final against Cork in the Gaelic Grounds. She was nominated for an All Star in 2009. With a total of 1-29 she was the highest scoring player in the Intermediate Championship of 2011.

== Family ==
Her granduncle was hurling team of the century member Mick Mackey, her grandfather was All Ireland medalist John Mackey, her father Ger was an inter-county hurler and her mother Vera an inter-county camogie player for Limerick and a member of the only ever Limerick Senior team to reach the Al Ireland final, when Cork beat them in 1980 after a replay.

== Association football ==
Mulcahy also represented the Republic of Ireland women's national football team at under-17, under-19 and university level.
