= Patricia Jackman =

Irish camogie player

Sport
- Sport: Camogie
- Position: Midfield
Club
- Years: Club
- Gailltír
Inter-county
- Years: County
- Waterford

Patricia Jackman is a former camogie player with Gailltir and Waterford. As of 2016, she had completed a master's degree and was undertaking a PhD in sport psychology.
