= Waterford Institute of Technology =

Former higher educational institution

- Institiúid Teicneolaíochta Phort Láirge
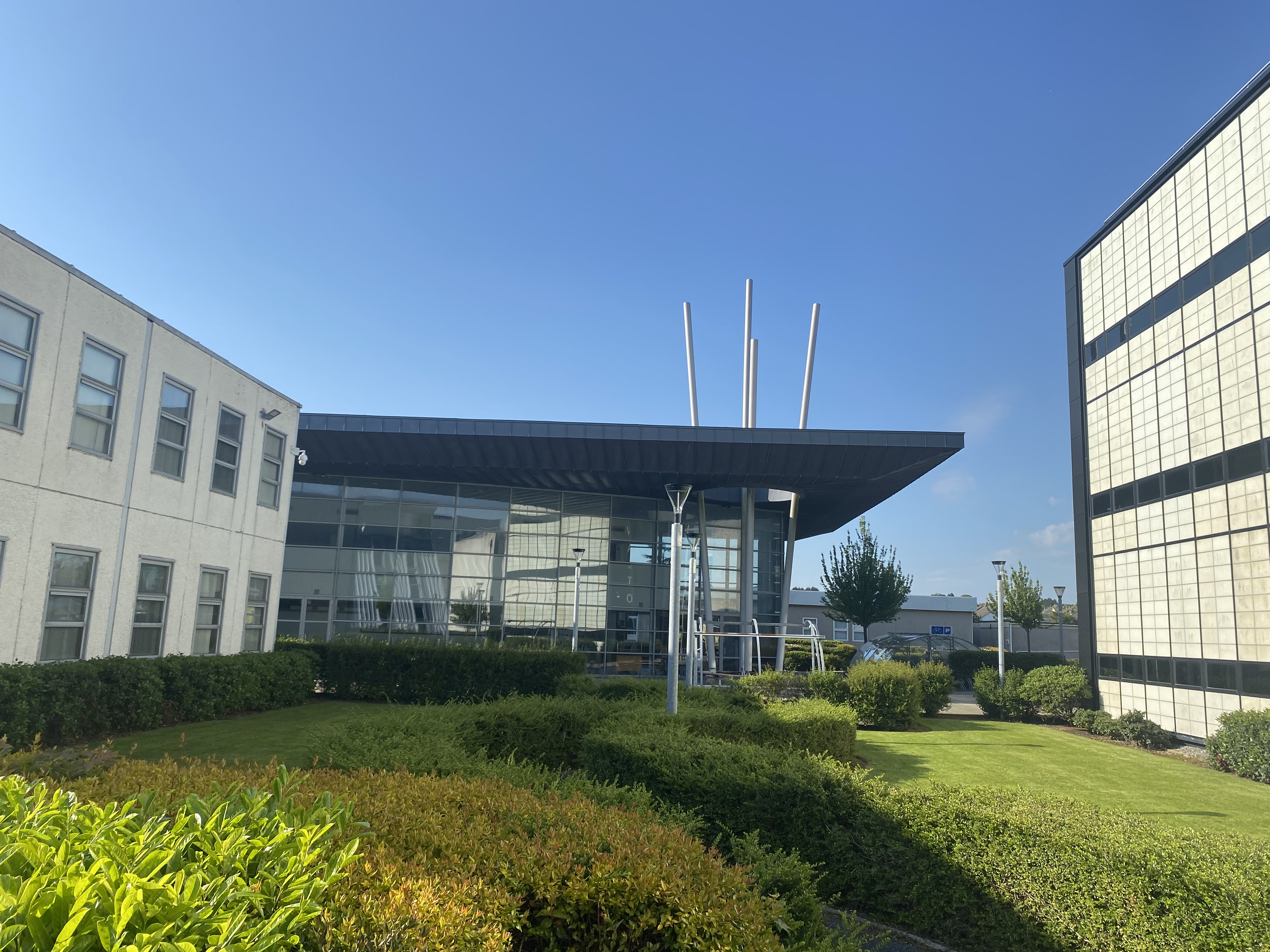
- Waterford campus in June 2021
- Former name: Waterford Regional Technical College
- Motto: Foirfe chun fónaimh
- Motto in English: Resolved to Serve
- Type: Public
- Active: 1970–1 May 2022
- Chair: Richard Langford
- President: William Donnelly
- Academic staff: 715
- Administrative staff: 395
- Students: 8,061
- Undergraduates: 7,208
- Postgraduates: 766
- Other students: 1,519
- Location: Cork Road, Waterford, Munster, X91 K0EK, Ireland
- Website: www.wit.ie

The Waterford Institute of Technology (WIT; Irish: Institiúid Teicneolaíochta Phort Láirge) was an institute of technology, located in Waterford, Ireland. The institute had six constituent schools and offered programmes in business, engineering, science, health sciences, as well as education & humanities.

The institute opened in 1970 as a Regional Technical College and adopted its name on 7 May 1997. Along with the Institute of Technology, Carlow, the institute was dissolved on 1 May 2022 and was succeeded by the South East Technological University.

== History ==
Waterford politicians made strenuous but unsuccessful efforts to locate a university in Waterford in the 1840s at the time of the formation of the Queen's University of Ireland. The cause was led by Thomas Wyse, Member of Parliament for Waterford City, who was not influential in the House of Commons, having strong Napoleonic links (he married a niece of Napoleon I of France), being a Catholic and leaning towards an independent Ireland. Galway, a much smaller city at the time, won out over Waterford, perhaps because of the necessity for geographical dispersion or to bolster the Irish language. Wyse wrote in the round on the matter in his text "Education reform or the necessity of a national system of education" (London, 1836).

A new third level institute was founded in 1970 as the Regional Technical College, Waterford. Once founded, the regional technical college grew as a result of the regional need for third-level education.

There were two other third-level institutions in the city, St John's Seminary founded in 1807 and later closed in 1999 and De La Salle Brothers teacher training college, opened in 1890 but closed as a third level college in 1939 and remained as a secondary school.

In 1997 the college adopted the name Waterford Institute of Technology by order of the Minister for Education Niamh Bhreathnach, with Dublin Institute of Technology being the only other institution with the "institute of technology" title at the time in Ireland. Following a change of government and enormous political pressure on behalf of other regional technical colleges, especially Cork Regional Technical College, all other regional technical colleges were renamed similarly by Minister for Education and Cork native Micheál Martin.

From 2001 the institute conferred its own awards at all levels from Higher Certificate to PhD, subject to standards set and monitored by the Higher Education and Training Awards Council (HETAC) which was established by the Government in June 2001, under the Qualifications (Education and Training) Act, 1999. In October 2005 the institute was selected by The Sunday Times newspaper as the "Institute of Technology of the Year" in Ireland.

At its height the institute now had a student population of approximately 6,000 full-time students and 1,000 part-time students and approximately 470 Full-time academic, 300 part-time and 300 support staff.

The institute formally applied in 2006 for university status in accordance with the Universities Act, 1997, and in January 2007 Dr Jim Port was engaged by the government to carry out a "preliminary assessment" of the institute's case for redesignation.

WIT and Nemeton TV (which is based in the Waterford Gaeltacht) ran a Higher Diploma in Arts in Television Production supported by Údarás na Gaeltachta.

== Ranking ==
In 2018, Webometrics placed WIT as the 7th best higher education body in Ireland (out of 32). The institute was also ranked at 10th place by Unirank, and the leading Irish institute of technology (with the exception of DIT, which classified as a Technology University).

== Campuses ==
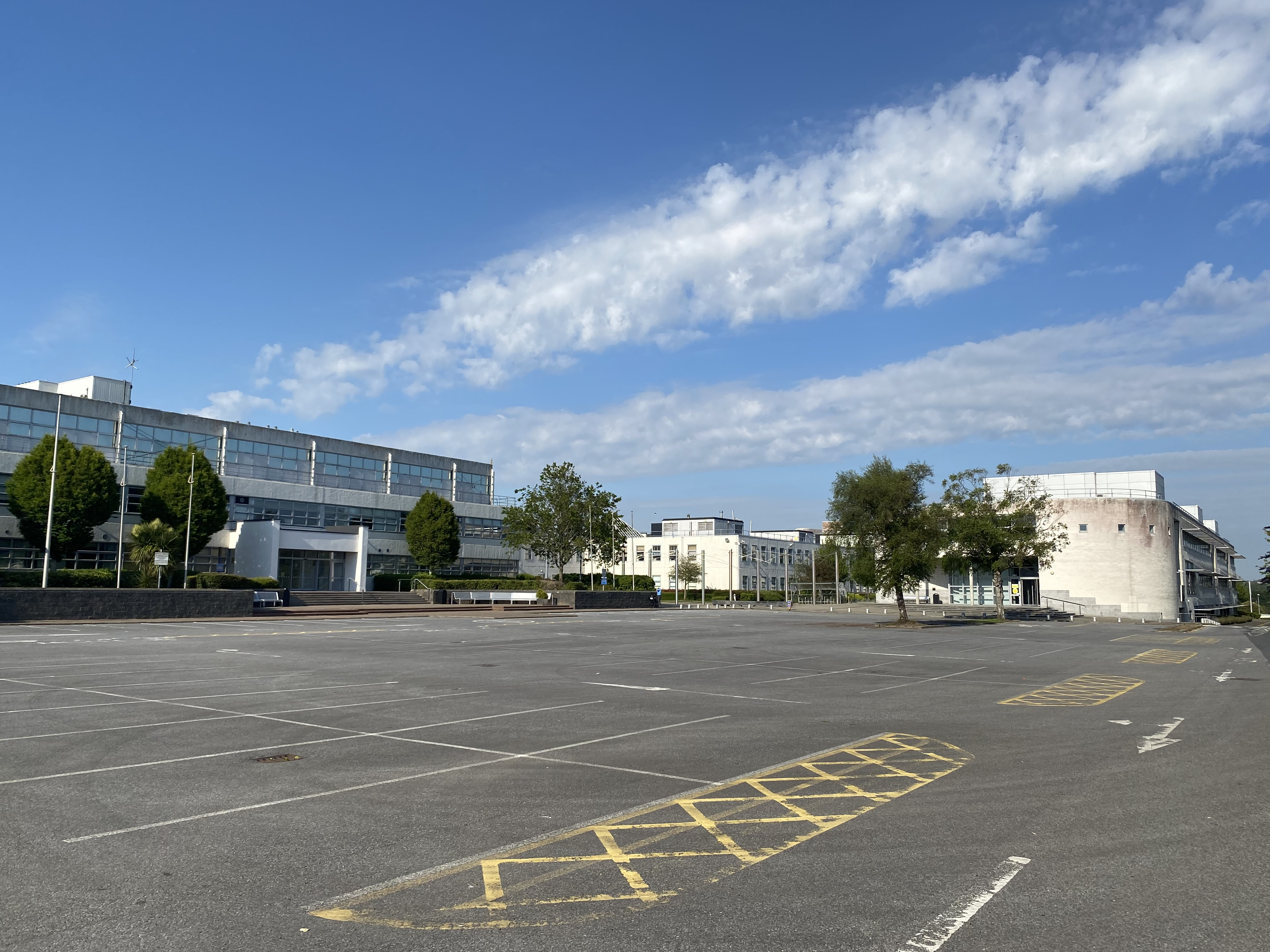
Waterford Institute of Technology campus

The institute had a number of campuses: Cork Road, College Street, Carriganore, the Applied Technology Building and the Granary.

== Organisation ==
The institute is divided into 6 schools and their various departments.

- School of Business
  - Department of Accountancy & Economics
  - Department of Management & Organisation
  - Department of Graduate Business Studies
- School of Lifelong Learning & Education
  - Department of Education
  - Department of Lifelong Learning
- School of Engineering
  - Department of Architecture
  - Department of the Built Environment
  - Department of Engineering Technology
- School of Health Sciences
  - Department of Nursing & Health Care
  - Department of Health, Sport & Exercise Science
- School of Humanities
  - Department of Applied Arts
  - Department of Creative & Performing Arts
  - Department of Languages, Tourism & Hospitality Studies
- School of Science and Computing
  - Department of Chemical & Life Sciences
  - Department of Computing and Maths

== Research at WIT ==
A Visual Summary of WIT Research

=== Research Centres ===
- Walton Institute for Information and Communications Systems Science
- Pharmaceutical and Molecular Biotechnology Research Centre (PMBRC)
- Eco-Innovation Research Centre
- Nutrition Research Centre Ireland (formerly MPRG)
- South Eastern Applied Material Research (SEAM)

=== Research Groups ===
School of Business
- Centre for Enterprise Development & Regional Economy
- Centre for Management Research in Healthcare & Healthcare Economics
- Centre for Newfoundland and Labrador Studies
- AIB Centre for Finance and Business Research
- Research in Innovation, Knowledge Transfer and Organisational Networks
- Waterford Crystal Centre for Marketing Studies

School of Engineering

- Advanced Automotive Electronic Control Group
- Advanced Manufacturing Technology Research Group
- Construction Industry Research & Knowledge Centre
- Materials Characterisation and Processing Group
- Microelectronics and Systems Research Group
- Nanotechnology Research Group
- Wireless Communications & Large Scale Simulation Group
- Convergent Technologies Research Group
- Building Information Modelling Research Group
- iBerg

School of Health Sciences

- Health Informatics Research Group
- Centre for Health Behaviour Research

School of Humanities

- Spirituality in Society and the Professions
- Centre For Research, Creativity & Innovation in Tourism
- Centre for Social and Family Research
- Content & Language Integrated Learning Research Group
- Creativity & Culture Research Group

School of Science

- Automotive Control Group
- Centre for INformation SYstems and Techno-culture
- Game Based Learning
- Health Informatics Research Group
- Optics Research Group

== Technological University for the South East ==
The institute had been planning a merger with IT Carlow for the formation of a technological university for the south east region since the mid-2010's. A vision document, "Technological University for the South East" (TUSE) was published in 2015, and a memorandum of understanding was signed in 2017. At the launch of TU Dublin in July 2018, the Taoiseach expressed regret that this TUSE bid had not progressed sufficiently following the Technological Universities Act 2018.

Approval was announced in November 2021, and the TU was formally established in May 2022.

== Notable alumni ==
Arts

- Gráinne Mulvey – Irish composer, currently Professor and Head of Composition at the Technological University of Dublin
- Máiréad Nesbitt – Irish fiddler, former member of the ensemble Celtic Woman

Politics

- Ciara Conway – TD
- Martin Cullen – Teachta Dála & Government Minister
- Grace O'Sullivan – MEP
- John Paul Phelan – Teachta Dála

Sport

- Niamh Briggs – Irish Rugby Player
- Steve Lennon - darts player
- Setanta Ó hAilpín – GAA & Australian Football League player
- Geordan Murphy – Irish Rugby Player
- Henry Shefflin – GAA player

Business

- Philip Lynch – businessman, CEO of IAWS Group
- Kerrie Power – businesswoman, CEO of HEAnet

== See also ==
- Education in Ireland
- List of higher education institutions in Ireland
