= Higher Education (Seanad constituency) =

Future Seanad constituency

- Seanad constituency

Future constituency
- Seats: 6
- Created from: Dublin University; National University

The Higher Education constituency is a future university constituency with an electorate comprising graduates of institutions of higher education in the Republic of Ireland which will elect six members of Seanad Éireann, the upper house of the Oireachtas (Irish parliament). The constituency will replace the separate three-seat Dublin University and National University of Ireland constituencies at the next Seanad general election, which will follow the next general election to Dáil Éireann (the lower house), due by January 2030.

== Background ==
From 1937, the Constitution of Ireland provided that of the 60 members of Seanad Éireann, three were to be elected by the National University of Ireland (NUI) and three were to be elected by Dublin University. This was regulated by the Seanad Electoral (University Members) Act 1937. In 1979 when the dissolution of the NUI was being considered, the Seventh Amendment of the Constitution was approved which mandated expansion of the franchise to other institutions of higher education in the State, in substitution for the number provided, and allowing the dissolution of the NUI or the University of Dublin. Plans to dissolve the NUI ultimately did not progress, instead reforms made the NUI a federal university, and no amendment was made to the legislation to enfranchise any other institution. Despite a number of attempts over decades in the Dáil and Seanad to give effect to the Seventh Amendment, no amending legislation was progressed and enacted until 2024.

In December 2019, Tomás Heneghan, a graduate of the University of Limerick, challenged his exclusion from the Seanad franchise on both the university panels and the vocational panels. He initially represented himself as a lay litigant, with the Free Legal Advice Centres (FLAC) joining his case and representing him from February 2020. In November 2021, the High Court dismissed his claim. On appeal, limited to the university franchise, in March 2023, the Supreme Court found that the limitation of the franchise in sections 6 and 7 of 1937 Act was unconstitutional as the Seventh Amendment had mandated the expansion of the franchise rather than merely permitting the Oireachtas to expand the franchise. In a separate judgment in July 2023, it suspended the declaration of invalidity to 31 May 2025.

=== 2024 Legislation ===
Under the Seanad Electoral (University Members) (Amendment) Act 2024, at any Seanad general election held after 31 March 2025, a new constituency named Higher Education will elect six senators.

Following engagement with Heneghan, 53 members of the Dáil voted against the 2024 Act, including Sinn Féin, the Labour Party, the Social Democrats, People Before Profit–Solidarity, Independent Ireland and a number of independent TDs, with Sinn Féin TD Denise Mitchell telling the Dáil "the Government has missed a huge opportunity with this Bill. It has taken what the Supreme Court found and interpreted it in the narrowest of ways...It is the Government's call, and the record will show that it was on the wrong side and acting in the interests of the elites and not in the interests of democracy" and the Social Democrats deputy leader Cian O'Callaghan saying "I urge the Government at this late stage to withdraw these tweaks and as quickly as possible in the next Oireachtas to bring forward meaningful change and stop excluding such a large part of our population from their democratic say simply on the basis of who holds a degree. It is completely and utterly indefensible." 72 TDs voted in favour of the legislation, including Fianna Fáil, Fine Gael, the Green Party, and a number of Independent TDs, including former Fine Gael TD Peter Fitzpatrick, former Progressive Democrats TD Noel Grealish, former Fianna Fáil TD Marc MacSharry, and Cathal Berry.

The legislation was enacted on 29 October 2024. On 18 December 2024, the first register for the Higher Education constituency opened with a new website (SeanadVoter.ie) for eligible voters to register through.

Following agreement between Fianna Fáil, Fine Gael and a group of independent TDs to form a new government in January 2025, the programme for government, published on 15 January, committed only to implementing the 2024 Act, which reflected Fianna Fáil's 2024 election manifesto pledge. Sinn Féin, the Green Party, the Labour Party and Social Democrats had committed in their election manifestos to expanding the Seanad franchise further.

As of 21 March 2025, all sections of the 2024 Act had come into force, with the exception of sections 27 and 31-46 that will take effect upon the next dissolution of Dáil Éireann.

== Franchise ==
A person who meets all of the following requirements is entitled to be registered as an elector:

- (a) has been awarded a degree by, or obtained a degree from, an institution that is a designated institution, or an institution that has been dissolved and the functions of which have been transferred to an institution that is a designated institution,
- (b) is a citizen of Ireland, and
- (c) has attained the age of eighteen years.

There is no requirement to be resident in Ireland, so electors living outside Ireland may vote. The registration authority on behalf of all the institutions is the National University of Ireland.

The first register of electors for this constituency came into effect on 1 April 2025 containing 62,775 registered electors. Those registered on the Dublin University and National University registers of electors were not auto-enrolled onto the Higher Education register of electors and must apply for registration as electors in the new constituency. The second register of electors was published on 1 June 2026 with 71,850 electors.

From 2026 onwards the voter registration deadline will be 26 February each year with the register coming into effect on 1 June. There is no supplementary register provided for in the legislation.

== Designated institutions ==
The following institutions are designated under the Act.

Designated institution	Affiliated and Historic institutions
Atlantic Technological University	Regional Technical College, Letterkenny (1971–1997)
Atlantic Technological University	Galway Regional Technical College (1972–1997)
Atlantic Technological University	Galway-Mayo Institute of Technology (1997–2022)
Atlantic Technological University	Institute of Technology, Sligo (1997–2022)
Atlantic Technological University	Letterkenny Institute of Technology (1997–2022)
Atlantic Technological University	Sligo Regional Technical College (1970–1997)
Atlantic Technological University	St. Angela's College, Sligo (2022)
Dublin City University	All Hallows College (1989–2017)
Dublin City University	Carysfort College (1975–1988)
Dublin City University	Mater Dei Institute of Education (1966–2016)
Dublin City University	NIHE Dublin (1980–1989)
Dublin City University	St Patrick's College, Dublin (1883–2016)
Dún Laoghaire Institute of Art, Design and Technology	Dún Laoghaire College of Art, Design and Technology (1994–1997)
Dundalk Institute of Technology	Dundalk Regional Technical College (1970–1998)
Munster Technological University	Cork Institute of Technology (1997–2020)
Munster Technological University	Cork Regional Technical College (1974–1993)
Munster Technological University	Cork School of Music (1980s–1993)
Munster Technological University	Crawford College of Art and Design (1993)
Munster Technological University	Crawford Institute (1976)
Munster Technological University	Institute of Technology, Tralee (1997–2020)
Munster Technological University	National Maritime College of Ireland (2004)
Munster Technological University	Regional Technical College, Cork (1993–1997)
Munster Technological University	Regional Technical College, Tralee (1977–1997)
National College of Art and Design (pre-2000)	National College of Art and Design (pre-1996)
National University of Ireland	Burren College of Art
National University of Ireland	Institute of Banking
National University of Ireland	Institute of Public Administration (2004–present)
National University of Ireland	Mary Immaculate College (1975–1994)
National University of Ireland	Maynooth University (NUI Maynooth)
National University of Ireland	Milltown Institute of Theology and Philosophy (2005–2015)
National University of Ireland	National College of Art and Design (2000–present)
National University of Ireland	NIHE Limerick (1976–1977)
National University of Ireland	Our Lady of Mercy College, Carysfort (1975–1988)
National University of Ireland	RCSI University of Medicine and Health Sciences (1977–present)
National University of Ireland	Shannon College of Hotel Management
National University of Ireland	St. Angela's College, Sligo (1978–2022)
National University of Ireland	St Patrick's College, Dublin (1975–1995)
National University of Ireland	St Patrick's College, Maynooth (1910–1977)
National University of Ireland	Thomond College of Education, Limerick (1976–1977)
National University of Ireland	University College Cork
National University of Ireland	University College Dublin
National University of Ireland	University of Galway (NUI Galway / University College Galway)
National University of Ireland	Uversity (2013–2017)
Royal College of Surgeons in Ireland (pre-1977)	Royal College of Surgeons in Ireland (pre-1977)
South East Technological University	Austin Waldron Regional Technical College (1988–1992)
South East Technological University	Carlow Regional Technical College (1970–1987), (1993–1997)
South East Technological University	Institute of Technology, Carlow (1998–2022)
South East Technological University	Waterford Institute of Technology (2001–2022)
South East Technological University	Waterford Regional Technical College (1972–2001)
Technological University Dublin	Dublin Institute of Technology (1992–2019)
Technological University Dublin	Institute of Technology, Blanchardstown (2002–2019)
Technological University Dublin	Institute of Technology, Tallaght (1994–2019)
Technological University of the Shannon: Midlands Midwest	Athlone Institute of Technology (1998–2021)
Technological University of the Shannon: Midlands Midwest	Athlone Regional Technical College (1970–1998)
Technological University of the Shannon: Midlands Midwest	Limerick College of Art, Commerce and Technology (1970–1992)
Technological University of the Shannon: Midlands Midwest	Limerick Institute of Technology (1999–2021)
Technological University of the Shannon: Midlands Midwest	Limerick Regional Technical College (1992–1999)
Technological University of the Shannon: Midlands Midwest	Limerick Technical College
Technological University of the Shannon: Midlands Midwest	Tipperary Institute (1999–2011)
Technological University of the Shannon: Midlands Midwest	Tipperary Rural Business Development Institute (1999–2011)
Trinity College Dublin	Church of Ireland College of Education (1970–2016)
Trinity College Dublin	Church of Ireland Theological Institute (2009–present)
Trinity College Dublin	Dublin Institute of Technology (1976–1996)
Trinity College Dublin	Froebel College of Education (1970–2016)
Trinity College Dublin	The Lir Academy (2011–present)
Trinity College Dublin	Marino Institute of Education (1970–present)
Trinity College Dublin	Royal Irish Academy of Music (2013–present)
University of Limerick	Garda Síochána College (2014–present)
University of Limerick	Mary Immaculate College (1974–1994; 1995–present)
University of Limerick	National Council for Exercise and Fitness (2011–present)
University of Limerick	NIHE Limerick (1976–1977; 1978–1989)
University of Limerick	St. Patrick's College Thurles (1973–2016)
University of Limerick	Thomond College of Education, Limerick (1976–1977; 1978–1991)
