= Fergal Maher Cup =

- Irish: Corn Fergal Maher
- Code: Hurling (Third Division)
- Founded: 2002; 24 years ago
- Region: Third-Level Institutions (GAA)
- Title holders: ATU SLIGO (3rd title)
- First winner: Athlone IT
- Most titles: ATU Sligo (3 titles)
- Sponsors: Electric Ireland
- Official website: Official Website

The Fergal Maher Cup is a hurling cup competition for Third-level Colleges. The Cup is awarded to the winners of the Tier 3 Championship (the Fitzgibbon Cup and Ryan Cup are the Tier 1 and Tier 2 Higher Education Hurling Championships).

The Fergal Maher Cup Championship is administered by Comhairle Ard Oideachais Cumann Lúthchleas Gael (CLG), the Gaelic Athletic Association's Higher Education Council which oversees Third-Level GAA championships. The GAA Higher Education Cup Championships are currently sponsored by the Electric Ireland following on from the Irish Daily Mail, Ulster Bank, Datapac, Bus Éireann and Independent.ie.

== History ==
The Cup is named in memory of Fergal Maher, a student and hurler at Dublin City University who hailed from Leixlip. Fergal was fatally injured when struck by a car near The Sheaf O'Wheat at Bracetown, Clonee, County Meath on 22 March 1998. At the time of his death Fergal Maher was a 2nd year engineering student at DCU and was Honorary Secretary of the DCU Hurling club. He played Ryan Cup hurling for DCU and at age 18 he captained the Kildare U21 hurling team.

The Cup was first presented for the Third Division Championship in 2002, the inaugural winner being Athlone Institute of Technology. In 2002/03 IT Tallaght achieved its maiden hurling title in this competition. King's Inns hurling club was launched in 2005 and in its first season won the trophy. The first President of the King's Inn Hurling Club was the President of the High Court (2001-2006), the Honourable Mr Justice Joseph Finnegan. In 2007/08 Edinburgh Napier University, winners of the British University Hurling Championship in both 2006/07 and 2007/08, became the first overseas winner of the Fergal Maher Cup.

== Fergal Maher Tournament 2018-19 ==
=== 2018-19 Group A Qualifying ===
Round	Team 1	Score	Team 2	Score	Where Played	Date
Rd1	Letterkenny Institute of Technology	0-05	St Mary's University College Belfast	10-23	O'Donnell Park, Letterkenny	11 February 2019
Rd1	Ulster University Magee	CC	Ulster University Coleraine	W/O	University of Ulster Magee	30 January 2019
Rd2	St Mary's University College Belfast	W/O	Ulster University Magee	CC	St Mary's University College	6 February 2019
Rd2	Ulster University Coleraine	5-12	Ulster University Magee	5-05	Owenbeg, Dungiven, Derry	6 February 2019
Rd3	Ulster University Coleraine	0-0†	St Mary's University College Belfast	0-0†	Owenbeg, Dungiven, Derry	18 February 2019
Rd3	Letterkenny Institute of Technology	W/O	Ulster University Magee	CC	Letterkenny Institute of Technology	13 February 2019

- †Match never played
- Qualifiers: St Mary's University College Belfast, Ulster University Coleraine

=== 2018-19 Group B Qualifying ===
Round	Team 1	Score	Team 2	Score	Where Played	Date
Rd1	Institute of Technology Tallaght	1-12	Marino Institute of Education	2-14	Thomas Davis All Weather Pitch	31 January 2019
Rd2	Institute of Technology Blanchardstown	3-11	Marino Institute of Education	7-15	TIT Blanchardstown GAA Pitch	6 February 2019
Rd3	Institute of Technology Blanchardstown	CC	Institute of Technology Tallaght	W/O	IT Blanchardstown GAA Pitch	25 February 2019

- Qualifier: Marino Institute of Education

=== 2018-19 Group C Qualifying ===
Round	Team 1	Score	Team 2	Score	Where Played	Date
Rd2	Mary Immaculate College Thurles	7-18	Galway-Mayo IT Letterfrack	0-13	UL Grounds	7 February 2019

- Cadets were drawn in this Group, but did not compete
- Qualifier: Mary Immaculate College Thurles

=== 2018-19 Finals ===
Semi-finals; 22 February		Final; 23 February
St Mary's University College Belfast	0-10
Mary Immaculate College Thurles	0-06	St Mary's University College	0-20
Ulster University Coleraine	2-07	Galway Mayo IT Letterfrack	3-7
Marino Institute of Education	3-13

== Roll of honour ==
=== Colleges by wins ===
Team	County	Wins	Last win
IT Tallaght	Dublin	3	2014
Cadet School	Kildare	3	2020
St. Mary's University College/ Belfast Metropolitan College	Antrim	2	2018
ATU Sligo	Sligo	3	2025
St. Patrick's College, Thurles	Tipperary	2	2013
Edinburgh Napier University	Scotland	2	2010
Coláiste Phádraig Droim Conrach	Dublin	2	1996
Dundalk IT	Louth	2	1997
GMIT Letterfrack	Galway/Mayo	1	2017
Galway/Roscommon ETB	Galway/Roscommon	1	2015
LIT Tipperary	Tipperary	1	2012
King's Inns	Dublin	1	2006
GMIT Castlebar	Mayo	1	2004
NUI Maynooth	Kildare	1	2003
Athlone IT	Westmeath	1	2002
UU Coleraine	Derry	1	1998
Mary Immaculate College, Limerick	Limerick	1	1995
Tralee IT	Kerry	1	1989
NIHE Dublin/DCU	Dublin	1	1988

=== Fergal Maher Cup Champion Colleges ===
- 1987/88 N.I.H.E. Dublin
- 1988/89 Tralee RTC
- 1989/90 Dundalk RTC
- 1990/91 Cadet School
- 1991/92 Cadet School
- 1992/93 Sligo RTC
- 1993/94 Coláiste Phádraig Droim Conrach
- 1994/95 Mary Immaculate College, Limerick
- 1995/96 Coláiste Phádraig Droim Conrach
- 1996/97 Dundalk RTC
- 1997/98 UU Coleraine
- 1998/99 Not held
- 1999/00 Not held
- 2000/01 Not held
- 2001/02 Athlone IT
- 2002/03 NUI Maynooth
- 2003/04 GMIT Castlebar
- 2004/05 IT Tallaght
- 2005/06 King's Inns
- 2006/07 IT Tallaght
- 2007/08 Napier University, Edinburgh
- 2008/09 St Mary's Univ.Coll./BMC
- 2009/10 Napier University, Edinburgh
- 2010/11 St Patrick' College, Thurles
- 2011/12 LIT Tipperary
- 2012/13 St Patrick's College, Thurles
- 2013/14 IT Tallaght
- 2014/15 Galway/Roscommon ETB
- 2015/16 IT Sligo
- 2016/17 G.M.I.T. Letterfrack
- 2017/18 St Mary's University College, Belfast
- 2018/19 St Mary's university College, Belfast
- 2019/20 Cadet School

=== Captains of winning teams ===
Year	Captain	College	County
1987/88		NIHE Dublin	
1988/89	Gerard Galvin	Tralee RTC	Limerick
1989/90	Diarmuid McCarthy	Dundalk RTC	Louth
1990/91		Cadet School	
1991/92		Cadet School	
1992/93		Sligo RTC	
1993/94		Coláiste Phádraig Droim Conrach	
1994/95		Mary Immaculate College	
1995/96		Coláiste Phádraig Droim Conrach	
1996/97		Dundalk RTC	
1997/98		UU Coleraine	
1998/99	No Championship	—	—
1999/00	No Championship	—	—
2000/01	No Championship	—	—
2001/02		Athlone IT	
2002/03		NUI Maynooth	
2003/04	Michael Donohue	GMIT Castlebar	Galway
2004/05		IT Tallaght	
2005/06	James McDonald	King's Inns	Wexford
2006/07	Michael Griffin	IT Tallaght	Dublin
2007/08	Conor Delaney	Edinburgh Napier University	Kilkenny
2008/09	Ciaran Clifford	St. Mary's/BMC	Cuchulainns, Armagh
2009/10	Shane Bennett	Edinburgh Napier University	Waterford
2010/11	Michael Lawlor	St. Patrick's College, Thurles	
2011/12	Séamus Lawlor	LIT Tipperary	Waterford
2012/13	Barry McLoughlin	St Patrick's College, Thurles	Tipperary
2013/14	Eric Finn	IT Tallaght	Dublin
2014/15	Joseph Mooney	Galway/Roscommon Education & Training Board	Galway
2015/16	Damien Golden	Westmeath	
2016/17	Tom Rigney	GMIT Letterfrack	Tipperary
2017/18			
2016/17	Tom Rigney	GMIT Letterfrack	Tipperary
2017/18	Conor Johnston	St Mary's University College, Belfast	Antrim
2018/19	Paul Gunning	St Mary's University College, Belfast	Westmeath
2019/20	Dean Riley	Cadet School	Galway

=== Man of The Match awardees ===
Year	MOTM	Top Scorer	College	County	Points scored
1987/88			NIHE Dublin/DCU		
			NIHE Dublin/DCU		
1988/89			Institute of Technology, Tralee		
		Gerard Galvin	Institute of Technology, Tralee	Limerick	0-9
1998/99	No Championship	—	—	—	—
1999/00	No Championship	—	—	—	—
2000/01	No Championship	—	—	—	—
2001/02			Athlone Institute of Technology		
			Athlone Institute of Technology		
2002/03			NUI Maynooth		
			NUI Maynooth		
2003/04	Gavin Keary		GMIT Castlebar	Galway	
			GMIT Castlebar		
2004/05			IT Tallaght		
			IT Tallaght		
2005/06			King's Inns		
			King's Inns		
2006/07			IT Tallaght		
		F. Rabbittee	IT Tallaght		2-3
2007/08	Andy Coen		Edinburgh Napier University	Galway	
			Edinburgh Napier University		
2008/09	Declan Coulter		St Mary's UC/BMC	Armagh	0-11 (4f)
		Declan Coulter	St Mary's UC/BMC		
2009/10	Tony Boyle		Edinburgh Napier University	Tipperary	
			Edinburgh Napier University		
2010/11			St. Patrick's College, Thurles		
			St. Patrick's College, Thurles		
2011/12	Séamus Lawlor		LIT Tipperary	Waterford	0-2
		James Logue	LIT Tipperary	Tipperary	1-2(1f,1/'65)
2012/13	Rory Hickey	Rory Hickey	St. Patrick's College, Thurles	Kilkenny	4-5(1-0 pen,3f)
2013/14	Aodhán Clabby	Aodhán Clabby	IT Tallaght	Dublin	0-14 (6f,2/'65)
2014/15	David Mangan		Galway/Roscommon Education & Training Board	Galway	0-3
		Joseph Mooney	Galway/Roscommon Education & Training Board	Galway	1-1
2015-16	Jack Galvin		IT Sligo	Westmeath	
2016-17	Sean Claffey		GMIT Letterfrack	Galway	
2017-18	Conor Johnston		St Mary's University College, Belfast	Antrim	
2018-19	Tiarnan Murphy		St Mary's University College, Belfast	Antrim	3-0

== Finals listed by year ==
Academic Year	Winners	Score	Runners-up	Score	Venue	Date
1979/80	Cork RTC [Cork IT]		Galway RTC v Northern Ireland Polytechnic			
1980/81						
1981/82	Limerick Technical College		N.U.U.		Drumcondra, Dublin	6 March 1982
1982/83						
1983/84						
1984/85						
1985/86						
1986/87						
1987/88	NIHE Dublin		Dundalk RTC or Magee College			
1988/89	Tralee RTC	1-13	St. Patrick's College, Thurles	0-02		5 April 1989?
1989/90	Dundalk RTC		Army Apprentice School v Air Corps			
1990/91	Cadet School		UU Coleraine v Tralee RTC			
1991/92	Cadet School		Mary Immaculate College, Limerick		Newbridge	8 March 1992
1992/93	Sligo RTC	6-07	Cadet School	3-08	Naas	17 February 1993
1993/94	Coláiste Phádraig Droim Conrach					
1994/95	Mary Immaculate College, Limerick					
1995/96	Coláiste Phádraig Droim Conrach					
1996/97	Dundalk RTC					
1997/98	UU Coleraine					
1998/99	No Div 3 championship	—	—	—	—	—
1999/00	No Div 3 championship	—	—	—	—	—
2000/01	No Div 3 championship	—	—	—	—	—
2001/02	Athlone Institute of Technology					
2002/03	NUI Maynooth					
2003/04	GMIT Castlebar	3-13	GMIT Letterfrack	1-05	Garrycastle, Athlone	6 March 2004
2004/05	Institute of Technology, Tallaght	1-08	Dundalk Institute of Technology	1-05	LIT, Limerick	5 March 2005
2005/06	King's Inns	2-13	IT Tallaght	1-14 (AET)	Mardyke Sports Ground, Cork	4 March 2006
2006/07	IT Tallaght	4-14	King's Inns	0-05	Carlow IT, Carlow	10 March 2007
2007/08	Edinburgh Napier University	3-08	GMIT Letterfrack	1-10	CIT, Bishopstown, Cork	1 March 2008
2008/09	St Mary's University College/ Belfast Metropolitan College	3-14	Edinburgh Napier University	2-16	TCD Grounds, Santry, Dublin	7 March 2009
2009/10	Edinburgh Napier University	3-16	Dundalk Institute of Technology	1-10	Dangan Sports Grounds, Galway	6 March 2010
2010/11	St. Patrick's College, Thurles	2-11	Cork Colleges of Further Education	1-04	WIT, Carraiganore, Waterford	26 February 2011
2011/12	LIT Tipperary	2-06	St. Patrick's College, Thurles	0-08	The Farm, Curraheen, Cork	3 March 2012
2012/13	St. Patrick's College, Thurles	4-19	St. Mary's University College (Belfast)	1-07	Carnmore GAA Club, Galway	2 March 2013
2013/14	IT Tallaght	0-28	Cork Colleges of Further Education	2-20	The Dub, QUB, Belfast	1 March 2014
2014/15	Galway/Roscommon Education & Training Board	2-10	Cork Colleges of Further Education	1-09	Limerick IT Grounds	28 February 2015
2015/16	IT Sligo	4-12	GMIT Letterfrack	0-13	CIT, Bishopstown, Cork	27 February 2016
2016/17	GMIT Letterfrack	5-12	Marino Institute of Education	4-09	Dangan Sports Grounds, Galway	25 February 2017
2017/18	St Mary's University College (Belfast)	0-20	Galway-Mayo IT Letterfrack	3-09	Mallow, County Cork	24 February 2018
2018/19	St Mary's University College (Belfast)	4-12	Marino Institute of Education	1-08	WIT Sports Campus	23 February 2019
