= Seventh Amendment of the Constitution of Ireland =

Amendment to extend Seanad representation

- 5 July 1979
- To extend Seanad representation to graduates of other third-level institutions

Results
Choice	Votes	%
Yes	552,600	92.40%
No	45,484	7.60%
Valid votes	598,084	96.06%
Invalid or blank votes	24,562	3.94%
Total votes	622,646	100.00%
Registered voters/turnout	2,179,466	28.57%

The Seventh Amendment of the Constitution (Election of Members of Seanad Éireann by Institutions of Higher Education) Act 1979 is an amendment to the Constitution of Ireland that provides that the procedure for the election of six members of the Senate in the university constituencies could be altered by law. It was approved by referendum on 5 July 1979 and signed into law on 3 August of the same year.

The first statutory change under the terms of the amendment was the Seanad Electoral (University Members) (Amendment) Act 2024, which replaced the three-seat National University of Ireland and Dublin University constituencies with a six-seat Higher Education constituency.

== Background ==
In the new Seanad created by the Constitution adopted in 1937, six seats were elected by universities: three by the National University and three by Dublin University (or Trinity College Dublin). The government in 1979 proposed splitting up the National University of Ireland (NUI) and creating separate universities in Cork, Dublin, and Galway. It was concerned that the outline of seats in the Constitution could act as a bar to this proposal, or that the new proposed universities would lose any representation. The constitutional amendment allowed a redistribution of the six university seats between these universities and any other institutions of higher education in the State. It also ensured that the section could not be invoked to prohibit the dissolution of either of the named universities.

== Changes to the text ==
- Alterations to Article 18.4 (new text is in bold):

1°. The elected members of Seanad Éireann shall be elected as follows:

i. Three shall be elected by the National University of Ireland.
ii. Three shall be elected by the University of Dublin.
iii. Forty-three shall be elected from panels of candidates constituted as hereinafter provided.

2°. Provision may be made by law for the election, on a franchise and in the manner to be provided by law, by one or more of the following institutions, namely:

i. the universities mentioned in subsection 1 of this section,
ii. any other institutions of higher education in the State, of so many members of Seanad Éireann as may be fixed by law in substitution for an equal number of the members to be elected pursuant to paragraphs i and ii of the said subsection 1.

A member or members of Seanad Éireann may be elected under this subsection by institutions grouped together or by a single institution.

3°. Nothing in this Article shall be invoked to prohibit the dissolution by law of a university mentioned in subsection 1 of this section.

== Oireachtas debate ==
The Seventh amendment was introduced by Minister for Education John Wilson for the Fianna Fáil government. He described the purpose of the bill as:

The purpose of the Bill is to remove an obstacle in the way of legislation to deal with university reorganisation. Article 18 (4) of the Constitution stipulates that three Members each shall be elected to the Seanad by the National University of Ireland and by the University of Dublin. A proposal to establish independent universities at Dublin, Cork and Galway in place of the National University of Ireland involves an alteration in the arrangements for the election of Members to the Seanad. It may be argued that the arrangements for the election of Members to the Seanad in accordance with the provisions of paragraphs (i) and (ii) of section 4 of Article 18 would automatically lapse to the relevant extent if one or both of the named universities ceased to exist. In this connection, the following considerations arise—

(i) the alternative arrangement, if any, which should be made for the election of Members in substitution for those Members which would otherwise be elected by the institution which ceased to exist: an amendment of the Constitution would be necessary for the purpose of allowing such an alternative arrangement to be made;

(ii) would it be permissible, in the absence of an appropriate amendment of Article 18 (4) of the Constitution, to enact legislation which would have the effect of altering the provision in that section of Article (18) for the election of Members to the Seanad?

(iii) Could Article 18 of the Constitution be invoked to prohibit the dissolution by law of a university mentioned in Article 18 (4)?

It was not opposed by the opposition parties Fine Gael and the Labour Party and the Bill passed final stages in the Dáil on 23 May. It passed all stages in the Seanad on 31 May and proceeded to a referendum on 5 July.

== Result ==
The referendum was held on the same day as the Sixth Amendment, which dealt with the validity of certain child adoption orders, and was approved on a low turnout by 552,600 (92.4%) votes in favour to 45,484 (7.6%) against.

Seventh Amendment of the Constitution of Ireland referendum
Choice	Votes	%
For	552,600	92.40
Against	45,484	7.60
Total	598,084	100.00
Valid votes	598,084	96.06
Invalid/blank votes	24,562	3.94
Total votes	622,646	100.00
Registered voters/turnout	2,179,466	28.57

Results by constituency
Constituency	Electorate	Turnout (%)	Votes		Proportion of votes	
Constituency	Electorate	Turnout (%)	Yes	No	Yes	No
County Carlow	24,967	35.8%	7,889	624	92.7%	7.3%
County Cavan	38,362	27.0%	9,245	673	93.2%	6.8%
County Clare	57,689	26.3%	13,793	775	94.7%	5.3%
Cork City	84,908	35.5%	27,441	1,803	93.8%	6.2%
County Cork	166,470	33.2%	49,900	3,061	94.2%	5.8%
County Donegal	80,232	23.0%	16,524	1,237	93.0%	7.0%
Dublin City	361,067	22.9%	70,791	9,047	88.7%	11.3%
County Dublin	254,107	26.2%	56,611	8,125	87.4%	12.6%
County Galway	112,351	25.6%	25,976	1,666	94.0%	6.0%
County Kerry	83,780	27.0%	20,508	1,133	94.8%	5.2%
County Kildare	59,355	25.3%	13,335	1,167	92.0%	8.0%
County Kilkenny	44,688	29.1%	11,569	799	93.5%	6.5%
County Laois	31,743	34.5%	9,773	656	93.7%	6.3%
County Leitrim	20,657	22.9%	4,198	286	93.6%	6.4%
Limerick City	37,938	40.9%	13,994	924	93.8%	6.2%
County Limerick	63,716	32.8%	19,017	973	95.1%	4.9%
County Longford	20,703	27.5%	5,080	331	93.9%	6.1%
County Louth	54,893	34.2%	16,705	1,376	92.4%	7.6%
County Mayo	81,912	22.3%	16,899	616	96.5%	3.5%
County Meath	57,530	26.9%	13,758	1,074	92.8%	7.2%
County Monaghan	34,093	26.8%	8,183	557	93.6%	6.4%
County Offaly	36,463	32.9%	10,786	697	94.1%	5.9%
County Roscommon	37,052	27.6%	9,276	493	94.9%	5.1%
County Sligo	37,123	27.1%	8,984	612	93.6%	6.4%
North Tipperary	38,550	39.5%	13,711	793	94.5%	5.5%
South Tipperary	49,280	35.9%	15,846	1,016	94.0%	6.0%
Waterford City	20,238	33.9%	6,096	448	93.2%	6.8%
County Waterford	35,284	33.3%	10,441	771	93.1%	6.9%
County Westmeath	38,406	26.3%	8,924	750	92.2%	7.8%
County Wexford	62,531	40.4%	22,574	1,521	93.7%	6.3%
County Wicklow	53,378	31.8%	14,773	1,498	90.8%	9.2%
Total	2,179,466	28.6%	552,600	45,484	92.4%	7.6%

Note: For this referendum and the Sixth Amendment held on the same day, the constituencies used were each county and county borough (city), which were deemed under section 2 of the Referendum (Amendment) Act 1979 to be constituencies for the purpose of the poll. Usually in Irish referendums the Dáil Éireann general election constituencies are used.

== Consequential changes ==
Until 2024, no change was made to the distribution or electorate of the six university seats. The NUI was not disbanded, although the Universities Act 1997 upgraded its "constituent colleges" to "constituent universities". Other institutes of higher education have increased in number and status, with the NIHEs and DIT of 1979 gaining university status in 1989 and 2019 respectively; graduation from none of them confers a vote in Seanad elections.

The Fine Gael–Labour government returned after the 2011 election proposed to abolish the Seanad in its entirety. After the proposal was rejected by referendum in 2013, the government agreed instead to consider reforming the Seanad. In February 2014, it published a draft Seanad Electoral (University Members) (Amendment) Bill, which would create a single six-seat constituency in which anyone with a degree-level qualification from a recognised institution would be eligible to vote. In 2015, the Working Group on Seanad Reform appointed by the government issued its report (the "Manning report"), which endorsed the 2014 bill but also recommended that 30 of the 43 Vocational panel senators should be directly elected, and that university graduate voters would have to choose between voting in the university constituency or one of the five panel constituencies.

The Fine Gael-led government returned after the 2016 election made implementing the 2015 report a priority. Simon Coveney, answering a Dáil question in July 2016 as Minister for Housing, Planning, Community and Local Government, said implementation of the 1979 amendment would be "further considered in the context of [the 2015 report] … and having regard to the work of the last government on [the 2014 draft bill]. In February 2018, Taoiseach Leo Varadkar proposed to establish an Oireachtas special committee to meet for eight months and "develop specific proposals to legislate" implementation of the 2015 report; he added, "The university panels should be retained as recommended. They have served us well, although they should be reformed to implement the result of the 1979 referendum and open up the franchise to graduates of all higher level institutions of education."

In 2018, Varadkar established an all-party committee - the Seanad Reform Implementation Group - to examine the 2015 Manning report and make recommendations on implementation of the report. The committee was chaired by former Minister for Justice, Attorney General and Tánaiste Michael McDowell, and reported to the Taoiseach in December 2018. It recommended that 34 senators should be directly elected by the people, 15 senators elected by TDs, senators and members of local authorities, and six elected by graduates of institutions of higher education across the state. The report also carried a proposed bill to implement the recommendations.

In the 2020 general election, the manifestos of Sinn Féin and the Green Party promised to implement the Manning report and the report of the Seanad Reform Implementation Group. Seanad electoral reform was excluded from the resulting Fianna Fáil–Fine Gael–Green coalition's programme for government and the government gave no commitment to reform the Seanad electoral process. Fianna Fáil senators introduced a private member's bill, the Seanad Electoral (University Members) (Amendment) Bill 2020, which would create a single university constituency encompassing "All Universities in the State, and Institutions of Higher Education in the State as provided for by the Minister [for Local Government]", with the franchise extended to holders of degrees or diplomas accredited by Quality and Qualifications Ireland. The second stage debate was adjourned in November 2020 at the request of Malcolm Noonan, the Minister of State for electoral reform, who suggested that gaps in the bill's provisions could best be filled in by waiting for the Electoral Commission due by the end of 2021. Attempts by the Civil Engagement Group to include Seanad reform in the Electoral Commission legislation failed and the Fianna Fáil bill came to third stage debate on 5 July 2023. A number of independent senators also introduced a bill in 2020 to expand the Seanad franchise - it was identical to the proposed legislation included in the report of the Seanad Reform Implementation Group.

On 31 March 2023, the Supreme Court ruled in Heneghan v Minister for Housing, Planning and Local Government that the Seventh Amendment provided for the mandatory expansion of the franchise rather than a discretionary government power to extend the franchise. The court suspended its decision to 31 July 2023. At a further hearing in June 2023 the Attorney General argued for a further four-year suspension by the Court. On 26 July 2023, the Supreme Court agreed to suspend the effect of its decision, but for a period of two years only, until 26 May 2025. The case had been dismissed by the High Court in November 2021, however the applicant, Tomás Heneghan, appealed that decision directly to the Supreme Court.

During a debate in the Seanad in September 2023, Varadkar said "I always felt that there would not be consensus on reform and that that was going to be one of the difficulties...There is a case for indirect election of a second Chamber, if we are going to have one. If we have a directly-elected Chamber, there is a case for indirect election to a second Chamber. I would not like to say to our councillors that they will no longer get to elect any Senators. That is what was proposed." Varadkar was interrupted during his statement by McDowell confirming removal of the vote from councillors was not proposed.

The government published a General Scheme for the Seanad Electoral (University Members) (Amendment) Bill for consultation in May 2024. The bill was enacted later in 2024, with the six- seat Higher Education constituency coming into being the following year. The 2025 Seanad election was thus the last to use the two old university constituencies.

== See also ==
- Politics of the Republic of Ireland
- History of the Republic of Ireland
- University constituency
- 1979 Irish constitutional referendums
- Amendments to the Constitution of Ireland
