= 1999 Fitzgibbon Cup =

Irish collegiate hurling tournament

- Dates: 30 January 1999 – 28 February 1999
- Teams: 20
- Sponsor: Bus Éireann
- Champions: Waterford Institute of Technology (3rd title)
- Runners-up: University College Cork

Tournament statistics
- Matches played: 19
- Goals scored: 56 (2.95 per match)
- Points scored: 439 (23.11 per match)
- Top scorer(s): Dave Bennett (1-26)

The 1999 Fitzgibbon Cup was the 86th staging of the Fitzgibbon Cup since its establishment by the Gaelic Athletic Association in 1912. The first-round games were held on 30 January 1999, with Garda Síochána College hosting the latter stages of the cup from 27 to 28 February 1999.

University College Cork were the defending champions.

On 28 February 1999, Waterford Institute of Technology won the Fitzgibbon Cup after beating University College Cork by 4–15 to 3–12 in the final. This was their third cup title overall and their first title since 1995.

== Results ==
=== Preliminary round ===
30 January 1999 Preliminary round	Athlone Institute of Technology	3-08 - 1-07	St. Patrick's College	Athlone
	D O'Shaughnessy 2-2, E Hyland 1-0, D McClern 0-2, N Dibley 0-2, P Hickey 0-2.		G Duffy 1-0, D Kennedy 0-3, R Byrne 0-1, A Begley 0-1, G O'Connor 0-1.

30 January 1999 Preliminary round	Mary Immaculate College	1-13 - 0-07	Institute of Technology, Carlow	Limerick
	D Loughrey 0-6, B Dagg 1-0, C O'Shea 0-3, M Brooks 0-2, D Hoyne 0-2.		W Hickey 0-4, D Hogan 0-1, D Forde 0-1, JJ Staunton 0-1.

30 January 1999 Preliminary round	University of Limerick	1-16 - 1-07	Maynooth University
	M Kerins 1-4, F Healy 0-3, O Fitzgerald 0-3, R Gantley 0-2, D Forde 0-1, J Butler 0-1, S Ryan 0-1, P Moroney 0-1.		D Scallon 0-6, J Kane 1-0, D Hardiman 0-1.

3 February 1999 Preliminary round	Limerick Institute of Technology	1-16 - 0-05	Ulster University, Jordanstown	Drumcondra
	B O'Connor 0-7, A O'Rahilly 1-2, G Nestor 0-2, L Forde 0-1, M Morrissey 0-1, J McDonald 0-1, M O'Hara 0-1, P Barry 0-1.		B McNaughton 0-2, M McCullough 0-2, D Gamble 0-1.

=== First round ===
3 February 1999 First round	Waterford Institute of Technology	4-17 - 2-08	Athlone Institute of Technology	Asper Park
	D Bennett 1-8, H Shefflin 2-4, N Ronan 0-4, M O'Leary 1-0, W Maher 0-1.		D Shaughnessy 1-2, P Hammond 1-0, E Hyland 0-3, D McClaren 0-1, T Hillary 0-1, P Diviney 0-1.

3 February 1999 First round	University College Dublin	4-15 - 2-07	Trinity College Dublin	Belfield
	P Darcy 2-2, M Gordon 2-1, P Ormond 0-4, K O'Donovan 0-3, R Moore 0-2, J Berkry 0-2, D McCarthy 0-1.		D Carroll 1-2, D Berry 1-0, A Kerins 0-3, D de Paor 0-2.

3 February 1999 First round	Queen's University, Belfast	0-06 - 0-19	Dublin City University	Malone Road
	E Trainor 0-3, S Higgins 0-1, J McINtosh 0-1, P McCormick 0-1.		R Brennan 0-7, S Ryan 0-4, V Franks 0-3, E McEneaney 0-2, T Ó hAilpín 0-2, C Herrity 0-1.

3 February 1999 First round	Dublin Institute of Technology	0-14 - 1-13	Mary Immaculate College	Terenure VEC Grounds
	P Meehan 0-7, O Canning 0-4, M Murphy 0-3.		D Loughrey 1-8, C O;Shea 0-3, B Dagg 0-1, J Collins 0-1.

3 February 1999 First round	University College Cork	0-14 - 0-09	Institute of Technology, Tralee	The Mardyke
	J Enright 0-6, J Murphy 0-3, J Kingston 0-2, J Browne 0-1, S Ryan 0-1, D Sheehan 0-1.		T Fletcher 0-6, A Markham 0-1, N Gilligan 0-1, S Doyle 0-1.

3 February 1999 First round	NUI Galway	5-12 - 1-12	Galway-Mayo Institute of Technology	Dangan
	S Donoghue 1-2, J Bolger 1-2, J Young 1-2, D Tierney 1-1, G McGlacken 1-1, E Brady 0-2, T fahy 0-2.		C Gath 0-6, P McAllen 1-0, R Redmond 0-3, G Hurney 0-2, J Cannon 0-1.

3 February 1999 First round	Garda Síochána College	2-14 - 0-16	University of Limerick	Páirc Shíleáin
	E Brennan 1-2, N Moloney 0-4, M Hubbart 1-0, G Flanagan 0-3, R O'Hara 0-2, O Baker 0-1, J Flanagan 0-1, S Cooke 0-1.		F Healy 0-4, R Gantley 0-4, A Kerins 0-3, D Forde 0-2, B Coleman 0-1.

9 February 1999 First round	Cork Institute of Technology	3-20 - 1-10	Limerick Institute of Technology	Páirc Uí Chaoimh
	E O'Neill 1-7, J O'Driscoll 1-2, G O'Connor 1-1, P Ryan 0-4, J O'Dwyer 0-3, P Sexton 0-2, J Sheehan 0-1.		B O'Connor 1-7, G Howard 0-2, A O'Rahilly 0-1.

=== Quarter-finals ===
17 February 1999 Quarter-final	University College Cork	0-15 - 0-07	Dublin City University	The Mardyke
	J Murphy 0-8, J Kingston 0-2, J Browne 0-1, R Flannery 0-1, R Hayes 0-1, E Bennett 0-1, F Fitzpatrick 0-1.		B Quinn 0-2, T Ó hAilpín 0-1, V Franks 0-1, F McMahon 0-1, S Ryan 0-1, R Brennan 0-1.

17 February 1999 Quarter-final	Waterford Institute of Technology	0-15 - 0-11	Cork Institute of Technology	Asper Park
	D Bennett 0-5, H Shefflin 0-3, A Geoghegan 0-2, M Bevans 0-2, N Nolan 0-1, M Molney 0-1, M O'Leary 0-1.		P Ryan 0-3, E O'Neill 0-2, J Dwyer 0-1, J Sheehan 0-1, N Lehart 0-1, J O'Driscoll 0-1, G O'Connor 0-1, M Molumphy 0-1.

17 February 1999 Quarter-final	University College Dublin	3-11 - 0-10	Mary Immaculate College	Belfield
	P Darcy 1-1, M Gordon 1-1, P Ormond 1-0, K O'Donovan 0-3, D O'Mahony 0-1, R Moore 0-1, P O'Brien 0-1, D McCarthy 0-1, D McGrath 0-1, B Murphy 0-1.		D Loughrey 0-7, J Dervan 0-1, J Daly 0-1, G O'Shea 0-1.

17 February 1999 Quarter-final	NUI Galway	3-09 - 5-09	Garda Síochána College	Dangan
	James Young 0-7, E Brady 1-2, J Bolger 1-0, B McMahon 1-0.		J Flanagan 3-2, G Flanagan 1-4, Joe Young 1-0, O Baker 0-1, J Lawlor 0-1, R O'Hara 0-1.

=== Semi-finals ===
27 February 1999 Semi-final	Waterford Institute of Technology	1-17 - 2-04	Garda Síochána College	Páirc Shíleáin
	D Bennett 0-8, H Shefflin 0-7, N Ronan 1-2.		N Moloney 1-2, J Flanagan 1-0, J Young 0-1, G Flanagan 0-1.	Referee: D Murphy (Wexford)

27 February 1999 Semi-final	University College Cork	1-11 - 1-08	University College Dublin	Páirc Shíleáin
	J Enright 0-7, J Murphy 0-4, S Fitzpatrick 1-0.		P O'Brien 0-6, P Darcy 1-2.	Referee: W Barrett (Tipperary)

=== Final ===
28 February 1999 Final	Waterford Institute of Technology	4-15 - 3-12	University College Cork	Páirc Shíleáin
	D Browne 2-2, D Bennett 0-5, A Moloney 1-1, N Ronan 1-1, H Sheeflin 0-2, M Bevan 0-2, A Geoghegan 0-1, S McClaren 0-1.		J Enright 1-7, J Kingston 1-2, D Sheehan 1-0, J Murray 0-1, R FLannery 0-1, J Murphy 0-1.	Referee: D Murphy (Wexford)

== Statistics ==
=== Top scorers ===
Overall

Rank	Player	Club	Tally	Total	Matches	Average
1	Dave Bennett	Waterford IT	1-26	29	4	7.25
2	David Loughrey	Mary Immaculate College	1-21	24	3	8.00
3	Johnny Enright	University College Cork	1-20	23	4	5.75
4	Henry Shefflin	Waterford IT	2-16	22	4	5.50
5	Paul Darcy	University College Dublin	4-05	17	3	5.66
5	Ben O'Connor	Limerick IT	1-14	17	2	8.50
6	John Murphy	University College Cork	0-16	16	4	4.00
7	John Flanagan	Garda College	4-03	15	3	5.00
8	Darren O'Shaughnessy	Athlone IT	3-04	13	2	6.50
8	Neil Ronan	Waterford IT	2-07	13	4	3.25

In a single game

Rank	Player	Club	Tally	Total	Opposition
1	John Flanagan	Garda College	3-02	11	NUI Galway
1	Dave Bennett	Waterford IT	1-08	11	Athlone IT
1	David Loughrey	Mary Immaculate College	1-08	11	Athlone IT
2	Henry Shefflin	Waterford IT	2-04	10	Athlone IT
2	Eugene O'Neill	Cork IT	1-07	10	Limerick IT
2	Ben O'Connor	Limerick IT	1-07	10	Cork IT
2	Johnny Enright	University College Cork	1-07	10	Waterford IT
3	Darren O'Shaughnessy	Athlone IT	2-02	8	St. Patrick's College
3	Paul Darcy	University College Dublin	2-02	8	Trinity College
3	Declan Browne	Waterford IT	2-02	8	University College Cork
3	John Murphy	University College Cork	0-08	8	Dublin City University
3	Dave Bennett	Waterford IT	0-08	8	Garda College
