= Ryan Cup =

Irish college hurling competition

- Irish: Corn Uí Riain
- Code: Hurling
- Founded: 1976/77
- Region: Universities/Third-Level Colleges (GAA)
- Trophy: Ryan Cup/Corn Uí Riain
- Title holders: TuDublin (2nd title)
- First winner: Cork Institute of Technology
- Most titles: Mary Immaculate College Limerick, Limerick Institute of Technology (5 titles)
- Sponsors: Electric Ireland
- Official website: http://www.he.gaa.ie/home

The Ryan Cup is the tier 2 hurling championship for third level colleges, the Fitzgibbon Cup being the tier 1 hurling championship trophy. The Ryan Cup competition is administered by Comhairle Ard Oideachais Cumann Lúthchleas Gael (CLG), the GAA's Higher Education Council.

At some time either in the late 1980s or in the early 1990s, the Ryan Cup - the trophy for the Division 1 Gaelic football league - was presented to the winners of what was then the Division II Championship (non-university). As a result of this mix-up, the Division II Championship became colloquially known as the 'Ryan Cup'. Unfortunately several other GAA trophy competitions bear this name, including still the Higher Education First-Division football league.

The GAA Higher Education Cup Championships are sponsored by Electric Ireland. The Ryan Cup was previously sponsored by Independent.ie [2014-2017], Irish Daily Mail [2012-2013], Ulster Bank [2007-2011], Datapac [2003-2006] and Bus Éireann [1998-2002].

== Ryan Cup Tournament 2018-19 ==
=== 2018-19 Group A Qualifying ===
Round	Team 1	Score	Team 2	Score	Where Played	Date
Rd1	Ulster University	0-09	Galway-Mayo IT	5-09	IT Sligo Grounds	23 January 2019
Rd2	Galway Mayo IT	9-21	Institute of Technology Sligo	1-09	Carnmore Hurling Club	5 February 2019
Rd3	Institute of Technology Sligo	2-06	Ulster University	0-19	IT Sligo Grounds	13 February 2018

Qualifiers: Galway-Mayo IT; Ulster University

=== 2018-19 Group B Qualifying ===
Round	Team 1	Score	Team 2	Score	Where Played	Date
Rd1	Institute of Technology Tralee	3-15	Athlone IT	0-03	IT Tralee GAA Pitch	23 January 2019
Rd2	Athlone IT	6-09	Queen's University of Belfast	2-08	AIT GAA Pitch	31 January 2019
Rd3	Queens University of Belfast	0-08	Institute of Technology Tralee	2-13	Ballykelly, County Londonderry	6 February 2019

Qualifiers: Institute of Technology Tralee; Athlone IT

=== 2018-19 Finals Tournament ===
Semi-finals; 22 February
Galway-Mayo IT	4-19
Athlone IT	1-12
Institute of Technology Tralee	1-17
Ulster University	2-18

Final; 23 February
Galway-Mayo IT	1-21
Ulster University	1-09

== Roll of honour ==
=== Colleges by wins ===
Team	County	Wins	Last win
Mary Immaculate College Limerick	Limerick	5	2012
Limerick Regional Technical College/Limerick Institute of Technology/TUS Limerick	Limerick	5	2001
Regional Technical College Carlow/Institute of Technology Carlow/SETU Carlow	Carlow	4	2010
Regional Technical College Tralee/Institute of Technology Tralee/MTU Kerry Campus	Kerry	4	2022
National University of Ireland Maynooth/Maynooth University	Kildare	3	2018
Dublin City University	Dublin	3	2014
Regional Technical College Galway/GMIT/ATU Galway	Galway	2	2019
Garda Síochána College	Tipperary	2	2017
Trinity College Dublin, University of Dublin	Dublin	2	2016
Tipperary Institute/Limerick Institute of Technology Tipperary/TUS Tipperary	Tipperary	2	2013
Regional Technical College Sligo/Institute of Technology Sligo/ATU Sligo	Sligo	2	2005
St John's Central College/Cork Colleges of Further Education	Cork	2	2004
Cork Regional Technical College/Cork Institute of Technology/MTU Cork	Cork	2	1989
Thomond Institute of Education, Limerick (now affiliated to UL)	Limerick	2	1986
MIC, St. Patrick's Campus, Thurles	Tipperary	1	2023
Athlone Regional Technical College/Athlone Institute of Technology/TUS Midlands	Westmeath	1	1996
Dublin Institute of Technology/TU Dublin	Dublin	2	2026
Waterford Regional Technical College/Waterford Institute of Technology/SETU Waterford	Waterford	1	1987
St Patrick's TC, Drumcondra (now affiliated to Dublin City University)	Dublin	1	1978

=== Ryan Cup Champion Colleges ===
Compiled from The Cups That Cheered. The current names of academic institutions are shown in parentheses.

- 1976/77 Cork RTC [Cork IT]
- 1977/78 St Patrick's TC, Drumcondra
- 1978/79 RTC Carlow [IT Carlow]
- 1979/80 Cork RTC [Cork IT]
- 1980/81 Mary Immaculate College, Limerick
- 1981/82 Mary Immaculate College, Limerick
- 1982/83 Limerick RTC [Limerick IT]
- 1983/84 Thomond College [University of Limerick]
- 1984/85 Limerick RTC (Limerick IT)
- 1985/86 Thomond College [University of Limerick]
- 1986/87 Waterford RTC [Waterford IT]
- 1987/88 Limerick RTC [Limerick IT]
- 1988/89 Cork RTC [Cork IT]
- 1989/90 Galway RTC [Galway-Mayo IT]
- 1990/91 RTC Carlow [IT Carlow]
- 1991/92 Limerick RTC [Limerick IT]
- 1992/93 RTC Carlow [IT Carlow]
- 1993/94 Dublin IT
- 1994/95 Garda Síochána College
- 1995/96 Athlone RTC [Athlone IT]
- 1996/97 RTC Tralee
- 1997/98 Dublin City University
- 1998/99 IT Sligo
- 1999/00 Cork Colleges of Further Education
- 2000/01 Limerick IT
- 2001/02 Dublin City University
- 2002/03 Tipperary Institute [Limerick IT Tipperary]
- 2003/04 Cork Colleges of Further Education
- 2004/05 IT Sligo
- 2005/06 Mary Immaculate College, Limerick
- 2006/07 RTC Tralee
- 2007/08 Maynooth University
- 2008/09 Mary Immaculate College, Limerick
- 2009/10 IT Carlow
- 2010/11 RTC Tralee
- 2011/12 Mary Immaculate College, Limerick
- 2012/13 Limerick IT Tipperary
- 2013/14 NUI Maynooth [Maynooth University]
- 2014/15 Trinity College Dublin
- 2015/16 Trinity College Dublin
- 2016/17 Garda Síochána College
- 2017/18 Maynooth University
- 2018/19 Galway-Mayo IT
- 2019/20
- 2020/21
- 2021/22 MTU Kerry Campus
- 2022/23 MIC St Patrick's Campus Thurles

=== Captains of winning teams ===
Year	Captain	College	County
1976/77	Tommy Cooke	Cork RTC [Cork IT]	Galway
1977/78		St Patrick's College, Drumcondra	
1978/79		RTC Carlow [IT Carlow]	
1979/80		Cork RTC [Cork IT]	
1980/81		Mary Immaculate College, Limerick	
1981/82		Mary Immaculate College, Limerick	
1982/83	Brendan McNamara	Limerick RTC [Limerick IT]	Clare
1983/84		Thomond College of Education, Limerick	
1984/85	Leo Doyle	Limerick RTC [Limerick IT]	Clare
1985/86		Thomond College of Education, Limerick	
1986/87	Colm Bonnar	Waterford RTC [Waterford IT]	Tipperary
1987/88	Brendan Heffernan	Limerick RTC [Limerck IT]	Limerick
1988/89		Cork RTC [Cork IT]	
1989/90	Eddie Casey	Galway RTC [Galway-Mayo IT]	
1990/91	Dave Guiney	Galway RTC [Galway-Mayo IT]	Wexford
1991/92	Pat O'Neill	Limerick RTC [Limerick IT]	Kilkenny
1992/93	Dermot Lawlor	RTC Carlow [IT Carlow]	Kilkenny
1993/94	Feargal Cleary	Dublin Institute of Technology	Clare
1994/95	John Cooper	Garda Síochána College	Wexford
1995/96	David Burke	Athlone RTC [Athlone IT]	Tipperary
1996/97	Charlie Donnellan	RTC Tralee [IT Tralee]	Galway
1997/98	Mick Ahern	Dublin City University	Cork
1998/99	Michael Finn	Institute of Technology Sligo	Cork
1999/00	Colm Crowley	St John's Central College Cork Colleges of Further Education	
2000/01	Aidan Cronin	Limerick Institute of Technology	Kerry
2001/02	Colin Herity	Dublin City University	Sligo
2002/03	Austin Cooney	Tipperary Institute [LIT Tipperary]	Tipperary
2003/04	Alan Lane	St John's Central College Cork Colleges of Further Education	Cork
2004/05	Tom Regan	Institute of Technology, Sligo	Galway
2005/06	Sean Kenny	Mary Immaculate College, Limerick	Cork
2006/07	Pádraig Briody	Institute of Technology, Tralee	Clare
2007/08	Eddie Costello	Maynooth University	Tipperary
2008/09	Shane O'Neill	Mary Immaculate College, Limerick	Limerick
2009/10	Des Shaw	Institute of Technology, Carlow	Carlow
2010/11	Eoin O'Brien	Institute of Technology, Tralee	Limerick
2011/12	Shane O'Sullivan	Mary Immaculate College Limerick	Waterford
2012/13	Martin Fitzgerald	LIT Tipperary	Kildare
2013/14	David Hennessy	NUI Maynooth [Maynooth University]	Kilkenny
2014/15	Jesse Kennedy	Trinity College Dublin	Dublin
2015/16	Conor McDonnell	Trinity College Dublin	Dublin
2016/17	Pádraic Maher	Garda Síochána College	Tipperary
2017/18	Pádraig Walsh	Maynooth University	Kilkenny
2018/19	Declan Cronin	GMIT	Galway

=== Man of The Match awardees ===
Year	MOTM	Top Scorer	College	County	Points scored
1976/77			Cork RTC [Cork IT]		
1977/78			St Patrick's College, Drumcondra		
1978/79			RTC Carlow [IT Carlow]		
1979/80			Cork RTC [Cork IT]		
1980/81			Mary Immaculate College, Limerick		
1981/82			Mary Immaculate College, Limerick		
1982/83			Limerick RTC [Limerick IT]		
1983/84			Thomond College of Education, Limerick		
1984/85			Limerick RTC [Limerick IT]		
1985/86		Miceál Scully	Thomond College of Education, Limerick	Limerick	1-7
1986/87	None	Ger Walsh	Waterford RTC [Waterford IT]	Kilkenny	2-1
1987/88			Limerick RTC [Limerick IT]		
1988/89		David Quirke	Cork RTC [Cork IT]	Cork	0-9
1989/90			Galway RTC [Galway-Mayo II]		
1990/91	None	Dermot Lawlor	RTC Carlow [IT Carlow]	Kilkenny	
1991/92		John Fitzgibbon	Limerick RTC [Limerick IT]	Cork	3-4
1992/93			RTC Carlow (IT Carlow]		
1993/94		Cathal Moran	Dublin Institute of Technology	Galway	1-5
1994/95			Garda Síochána College		
1995/96			Athlone RTC [Athlone IT]		
1996/97			RTC Tralee [IT Tralee]		
1997/98			Dublin City University		
1998/99	Kieran Frawley		Institute of Technology Sligo	Clare	0-0
		Dave Clarke	Institute of Technology Sligo	Galway	1-0
		Liam Kerrigan	Institute of Technology Sligo	Galway	0-3
1999/00			St John's Central College Cork Colleges of Further Education		
2000/01		K Cullinane	Limerick Institute of Technology		0-7 (4f)
2001/02			Dublin City University		
2002/03	Mark O'Leary	Mark O'Leary	Tipperary Institute [Limerick IT Tipperary]	Tipperary	2-7 (4f)
2003/04		Ciarán O'Leary	St John's Central College Cork Colleges of Further Education	Cork	2-4 (2f)
2004/05	Gerry Farragher	Gerry Farragher	Institute of Technology Sligo	Galway	1-9 (1-1f)
2005/06	Paul Horan		Mary Immaculate College, Limerick		0-2
		Mike Fitzgerald	Mary Immaculate College, Limerick		0-8
2006/07	Eoin Ryan		Institute of Technology, Tralee	Limerick	
2007/08	David Quinn		Maynooth University	Dublin	0-5
2008/09	Brendan Maher	Brendan Maher	Mary Immaculate College Limerick	Tipperary	0-5
2009/10	Niall Kilcoyne		Institute of Technology, Carlow	Westmeath	
2010-11	Nicky Quaid		Institute of Technology, Tralee	Limerick	0-2
		James Riordan	Institute of Technology, Tralee	Limerick	1-3
2011/12	Seán Curran	Seán Curran	Mary Immaculate College Limerick	Tipperary	0-6
2012/13	Shane McGrath	Shane McGrath	Limerick Institute of Technology, Tipperary	Clare	0-11 (7f,2'65s)
2013/14	Paul Winters	Paul Winters	NUI Maynooth [Maynooth University]	Dublin	0-11 (8f)
2014/15	Collie O'Neill	Collie O'Neill	Trinity College Dublin	Dublin	0-5 (2f)
2015/16	Fionn Ó Riain Broin		Trinity College Dublin	Dublin	
		Conor O'Carroll	Trinity College Dublin		3-0
2016/17			Garda Síochána College		
		Stephen O'Halloran	Garda Síochána College	Clare	2-4
2017/18	Brian Hogan		Maynooth University	Kilkenny	0-2 (2f)
		MJ Lalor	Maynooth University	Laois	1-2
		Pádraig Walsh	Maynooth University	Kilkenny	0-5
		Seán Buggy	Maynooth University	Kilkenny	0-5 (4f)
2018/19	Jarlath Mannion		GMIT	Galway	

== Finals listed by year ==
Under Match Details below, academic institutions are referred to by their names at the time of the competition. References give the current names of the institutions.

Year	Winners	Score	Runners-up	Score	Where Played	Date
1976/77	Cork Regional Technical College		Galway Regional Technical College			
1977/78	St Patrick's College, Dublin, Drumcondra		Cork RTC v Limerick Technical School			
1978/79	Regional Technical College, Carlow	3-09	Cork Regional Technical College	2-10	Cashel	16 June 1979
1979/80	Cork Regional Technical College		St. Patrick's College, Thurles v N.U.U.			
1980/81	Mary Immaculate College, Limerick	4-16	St Patrick's College, Dublin, Drumcondra	1-01		9 May 1981
1981/82	Mary Immaculate College, Limerick	Draw	Athlone Regional Technical College	Draw		4 May 1982
	Mary Immaculate College, Limerick	Replay	Athlone Regional Technical College	Replay		1982
1982/83	Limerick Regional Technical College	5-09	Mary Immaculate College Limerick	0-12	Claughaun	30 April 1983
1983/84	Thomond College of Education, Limerick		Athlone Regional Technical College		Birr, County Offaly	5 May 1984
1984/85	Limerick Regional Technical College		Waterford Regional Technical College		Bansha, County Tipperary	16 May 1985
1985/86	Thomond College of Education, Limerick	4-10	Cork Regional Technical College	2-08		
1986/87	Waterford Institute of Technology	4-12	Galway Regional Technical College	4-05	National Institute of Higher Education Limerick	5 May 1987
1987/88	Limerick Regional Technical College	1-10	Athlone Regional Technical College	0-05	Baldonnell	28 February 1988
1988/89	Cork Regional Technical College	0-12	Mary Immaculate College, Limerick	0-05	Ballygiblin, County Cork	20 April 1989
1989/90	Galway Regional Technical College	3-11	Mary Immaculate College, Limerick	1-03	Páirc na nGael, Limerick	1 April 1990
1990/91	Regional Technical College, Carlow	2-12	Cork Regional Technical College	2-07	Athlone Regional Technical College	9 March 1991
1991/92	Limerick Regional Technical College	4-15	Galway Regional Technical College	3-09	Young Ireland's Pitch, Dundalk	8 March 1992
1992/93	Regional Technical College, Carlow	2-13	Cork Regional Technical College	2-09	Castlegar, County Galway	14 March 1993
1993/94	Dublin Institute of Technology	5-15	Regional Technical College, Tralee	0-04	Carlow Hurling Club Grounds, Carlow	13 March 1994
1994/95	Garda Síochána College	2-15	Galway Regional Technical College	2-07	Limerick Gaelic Grounds	25 March 1995
1995/96	Athlone Regional Technical College	2-19	Regional Technical College, Carlow	2-09	Belfield, University College Dublin	10 March 1996
1996/97	Regional Technical College, Tralee	3-06	Galway Regional Technical College	2-06	The Farm, UCC, Cork	2 March 1997
1997/98	Dublin City University	3-08	Limerick Institute of Technology	2-08	Gaelic Grounds, Limerick	1 March 1998
1998/99	Institute of Technology, Sligo	1-05	University of Ulster, Coleraine	0-05	Garda College, Templemore, County Tipperary	28 February 1999
1999/2000	St John's Central College Cork Colleges of Further Education	1-15	Institute of Technology, Sligo	1-05	Carrigeen, County Kilkenny	5 March 2000
2000/01	Tipperary Institute	2-11	Athlone Institute of Technology	1-10	Parnell Park, Dublin	7 April 2001
2001/02	Dublin City University	1-13	St. Patrick's College, Drumcondra	0-11	Castlegar, County Galway	3 March 2002
2002/03	Tipperary Institute	5-13	Athlone Institute of Technology	1-11	The Ragg, Thurles	1 March 2003
2003/04	St John's Central College Cork Colleges of Further Education	2-11	St. Patrick's College, Drumcondra	2-09	Athlone IT	6 March 2004
2004/05	Institute of Technology, Sligo	3-13	Institute of Technology, Carlow	0-05	Gaelic Grounds, Limerick	5 March 2005
2005/06	Mary Immaculate College, Limerick	1-15	Maynooth University	1-07	The Mardyke, Cork	4 March 2006
2006/07	Institute of Technology, Tralee	2-15	University of Ulster Jordanstown	3-09	Dr Cullen Park, Carlow	10 March 2007
2007/08	Maynooth University	2-14	Tipperary Institute/St. Patrick's College, Thurles	1-07	Cork IT, Bishopstown, Cork	1 March 2008
2008/09	Mary Immaculate College, Limerick	1-12	University of Ulster Jordanstown	1-05	Clanna Gael Fontenoy, Dublin	7 March 2009
2009/10	Institute of Technology, Carlow	1-12	Dublin City University	0-13	Pearse Stadium, Galway	6 March 2010
2010/11	Institute of Technology, Tralee	1-17	Institute of Technology, Carlow	1-15	Waterford IT Grounds	28 February 2011
2011/12	Mary Immaculate College, Limerick	2-21	Institute of Technology, Tralee	0-10	The Mardyke, Cork	3 March 2012
2012/13	LIT Tipperary	1-25	Institute of Technology, Tralee	2-09	Pearse Stadium, Galway	2 March 2013
2013/14	National University of Ireland, Maynooth	0-18	Trinity College Dublin	0-08	Academy Pitch, QUB, Belfast	1 March 2014
2014/15	Trinity College Dublin	1-18	Queen's University Belfast	1-09	Gaelic Grounds, Limerick	28 February 2015
2015/16	Trinity College Dublin	3-16	Queen's University Belfast	0-07	CIT, Bishopstown, Cork	27 February 2016
2016/17	Garda Síochána College	5-24	Institute of Technology, Sligo	1-09	Pearse Stadium, Galway	25 February 2017
2017/18	Maynooth University	2-19	University of Ulster	0-09	Mallow, County Cork	24 February 2018
2018/19	GMIT	1-21	Ulster University	1-09	WIT Sports Campus, Waterford	23 February 2019
2019/20	Ulster University	1-10	Institute of Technology, Tralee	0-12	Stradbally	29 January 2020
