= Arthur Ryan (priest) =

Irish priest and poet

Arthur Ryan (1852–1922), was an Irish priest and poet, who served as president of St. Patrick's College, Thurles (1887–1903). Arthur Ryan was born in 1852 the son of John Ryan, in Scarteen, Co. Limerick, into Catholic gentry, Ryan family of Scarteen House and Emily House. He was educated for the priesthood in Oscott College, and ordained in 1876 at Thurles for the Cashel diocese, by Archbishop Thomas Croke.

Fr. Ryan was appointed to St. Patrick's College Thurles in 1876 initially as Dean and Professor before being appointed president in 1887. He was made Vicar General of the diocese. In 1903 he was appointed parish priest in St. Michael's, Church, Tipperary town. He was succeeded in 1903, as president of the college by his vice-president Fr. James J. Ryan.

A poet he wrote in the United Irishman, Irish Monthly and Tipperary Leader, under the initials A.R. A staunch nationalist he supported John Redmond's view that participation by nationalists in the first world war would help achieve Home Rule. Redmond requested Canon Ryan, to act as a representative of the Irish Party on the Provisional Committee of the Irish Volunteers, encouraging Irishmen to join the Irish Volunteers in the first world war. Canon Ryan during Christmas 1916, ministered to regiments of the 16th Irish Division on the wastern front battlefields.
