= 1979 referendum =

Referendums held in 1979 were:

- 1979 Scottish devolution referendum
- 1979 Welsh devolution referendum
- March 1979 Iranian Islamic Republic referendum
- 1979 Irish constitutional referendums
