= Sixth Amendment of the Constitution of Ireland =

Amendment on adoption orders

- 5 July 1979
- To ensure that certain adoption orders would not be found to be unconstitutional

Results
Choice	Votes	%
Yes	601,694	98.97%
No	6,265	1.03%
Valid votes	607,959	97.51%
Invalid or blank votes	15,517	2.49%
Total votes	623,476	100.00%
Registered voters/turnout	2,179,466	28.61%

The Sixth Amendment of the Constitution (Adoption) Act 1979 is an amendment to the Constitution of Ireland ensured that certain adoption orders would not be found to be unconstitutional because they had not been made by a court. It was approved by referendum on 5 July 1979 and signed into law on 3 August 1979.

== Background ==
In 1977 it came to light that for technical reasons child adoption orders made by An Bord Uchtála (the Adoption Board) might be found to be unconstitutional because they were not made by a court or judge. An amendment was therefore required to put the validity of these orders beyond question.

== Changes to the text ==
The amendment renumbered Article 37 as Article 37.1 and inserted the following section as Article 37.2:

2. No adoption of a person taking effect or expressed to take effect at any time after the coming into operation of this Constitution under laws enacted by the Oireachtas and being an adoption pursuant to an order made or an authorisation given by any person or body of persons designated by those laws to exercise such functions and powers was or shall be invalid by reason only of the fact that such persons or body of persons was not a judge or a court appointed or established as such under this Constitution.

== Oireachtas debate ==
The Sixth Amendment of the Constitution (Adoption) Bill 1978 was introduced by Fianna Fáil Minister for Justice Gerry Collins on 13 December 1978. It was supported by opposition parties Fine Gael and the Labour Party and it passed final stages in the Dáil on 28 February 1979. In the Seanad, Labour senators Justin Keating and Mary Robinson and Fine Gael senator Alexis FitzGerald proposed an amendment to include the words "notwithstanding the status of such person", which would allow for the adoption of a child of a marital family. This was not approved, and the Bill passed the Seanad without amendment on 5 April 1979. It was put to a referendum on 5 July, on the same day as the similarly uncontroversial Seventh Amendment which dealt with university constituencies for the election of the Seanad.

== Result ==
The Sixth Amendment was approved almost unanimously with 601,694 (99.0%) votes in favour and 6,265 (1.0%) against. This is the highest support there has been in any referendum for a proposal to amend the Constitution.

Sixth Amendment of the Constitution of Ireland referendum
Choice	Votes	%
For	601,694	98.97
Against	6,265	1.03
Total	607,959	100.00
Valid votes	607,959	97.51
Invalid/blank votes	15,517	2.49
Total votes	623,476	100.00
Registered voters/turnout	2,179,466	28.61

Results by constituency
Constituency	Electorate	Turnout (%)	Votes		Proportion of votes	
Constituency	Electorate	Turnout (%)	Yes	No	Yes	No
County Carlow	24,967	35.8%	8,544	81	99.1%	0.9%
County Cavan	38,362	27.0%	9,893	116	98.8%	1.2%
County Clare	57,689	26.3%	14,527	175	98.8%	1.2%
Cork City	84,908	35.6%	29,435	221	99.3%	0.7%
County Cork	166,470	33.3%	53,485	487	99.1%	0.9%
County Donegal	80,232	23.0%	17,756	261	98.6%	1.4%
Dublin City	361,067	23.0%	80,492	928	98.9%	1.1%
County Dublin	254,107	26.2%	65,285	601	99.1%	0.9%
County Galway	112,351	25.6%	27,709	272	99.0%	1.0%
County Kerry	83,780	27.1%	21,833	205	99.1%	0.9%
County Kildare	59,355	25.3%	14,531	179	98.8%	1.2%
County Kilkenny	44,688	29.1%	12,362	151	98.8%	1.2%
County Laois	31,743	34.5%	10,520	85	99.2%	0.8%
County Leitrim	20,657	22.9%	4,466	69	98.5%	1.5%
Limerick City	37,938	40.9%	15,116	110	99.3%	0.7%
County Limerick	63,716	32.8%	20,080	197	99.0%	1.0%
County Longford	20,703	27.6%	5,377	92	98.3%	1.7%
County Louth	54,893	34.3%	18,240	187	99.0%	1.0%
County Mayo	81,912	22.3%	17,518	189	98.9%	1.1%
County Meath	57,530	27.1%	14,955	167	98.9%	1.1%
County Monaghan	34,093	26.8%	8,753	106	98.8%	1.2%
County Offaly	36,463	32.9%	11,568	103	99.1%	0.9%
County Roscommon	37,052	27.6%	9,749	107	98.9%	1.1%
County Sligo	37,123	27.1%	9,565	137	98.6%	1.4%
North Tipperary	38,550	39.6%	14,583	135	99.1%	0.9%
South Tipperary	49,280	35.9%	16,942	193	98.9%	1.1%
Waterford City	20,238	33.9%	6,606	49	99.3%	0.7%
County Waterford	35,284	33.4%	11,321	109	99.0%	1.0%
County Westmeath	38,406	26.2%	9,633	148	98.5%	1.5%
County Wexford	62,531	40.4%	24,392	278	98.9%	1.1%
County Wicklow	53,378	31.8%	16,458	127	99.2%	0.8%
Total	2,179,466	28.6%	601,694	6,265	99.0%	1.0%

Note: For this referendum and the Seventh Amendment held on the same day, the constituencies used were each county and county borough (city), which were deemed under section 2 of the Referendum (Amendment) Act 1979 to be constituencies for the purpose of the poll. Usually in Irish referendums the general election constituencies are used.

== Later developments ==
The Thirty-first Amendment of the Constitution of Ireland, which took effect in 2015, added a new Article 42A on Children. It included a section which allowed for the adoption of any child, allowing for the first time the adoption of children of a marital family, as had been proposed in the amendment rejected in the Seanad in 1979. The new Article 42A.3 provided,

Provision shall be made by law for the voluntary placement for adoption and the adoption of any child.

== See also ==
- Politics of the Republic of Ireland
- History of the Republic of Ireland
- Constitutional amendment
- 1979 Irish constitutional referendums
- Amendments to the Constitution of Ireland
