= Phorest =

Irish software company

Phorest Salon Software
- Type: Private
- Industry: Salon, spa and clinic software
- Founded: 2004
- Headquarters: 66 / 67 Strand Street Great, North City, Dublin 1, D01 RW84
- Number of locations: 5 offices worldwide (Dublin, Cologne, Philadelphia, Helsinki and Brisbane) and operating in 11 countries
- Key people: Ronan Perceval, CEO Sylvie Mc Dermot, COO
- Products: Phorest Salon Software
- Number of employees: 500+
- Website: www.phorest.com

Phorest is salon and spa management software. It combines appointment booking, integrated payments, multi-channel marketing, staff performance tracking, and a loyalty programme in one platform.

It is used by salons, spas and aesthetic clinics across Ireland, the UK, USA and Australia. Phorest helps owners to increase average client spend, reduce no-shows and measure revenue from every marketing campaign. Designed specifically for hair and beauty operators and clinics offering aesthetic treatments, it includes digital consultation forms, face-mapping, and before/after imaging tools. It is suited for both multi-location and single site businesses.

== History ==
Phorest was founded in 2004, by Ronan Perceval in Dublin, Ireland. The company has offices in Dublin, Ireland; Helsinki, Finland; Brisbane, Australia; Cologne, Germany; and Philadelphia, USA.

Phorest first designed and developed an online messenger application, known as "Phorest Messenger", that it released in Ireland. In June 2005, Phorest acquired their largest competitor, Stylebase, adding 170 salons.

=== Funding ===
On 19 August 2011, Phorest announced it had received a seed investment of €1.3m from Enterprise Ireland and private investors.

In June 2018, the company announced a €20m round of funding from Susquehanna Growth Equity for international expansion.

== Honors and awards ==
- 2003: Runner-up Coca-Cola National Enterprise Award
- 2024: Ranked 40th in the Deloitte Fast 50 2025
- 2026: Bronze Award eir Business Chambers Award for Best Customer Experience - Private Sector
- 2026: Winner of the Best B2B Customer Experience - Small Business at the Customer Experience Awards 2026
