= Tom Fogarty (hurler) =

Personal information
- Native name: Tomás Ó Fogartaigh (Irish)
- Born: 1951 (age 74–75) Templetuohy, County Tipperary, Ireland
- Occupation: Roman Catholic priest

Sport
- Sport: Hurling
- Position: Left corner-back
Club
- Years: Club
- Moyne–Templetuohy
Club titles
- Tipperary titles: 1
Inter-county
- Years: County
- 1975-1976: Tipperary
Inter-county titles
- Munster titles: 0
- All-Irelands: 0
- NHL: 0
- All Stars: 0

Fr. Thomas Fogarty (born 1951) is a Roman Catholic priest and former hurler who played as a left corner-back at senior level for the Tipperary county team.

Born in Templetuohy, County Tipperary, Fogarty first played competitive hurling in his youth. attended Thurles CBS, and trained for the priesthood at St. Patrick's College, Thurles, and was ordained for the Diocese of Cashel and Emly.

== Hurling career ==
He arrived on the inter-county scene at the age of seventeen when he first linked up with the Tipperary minor teams as a dual player before later joining the under-21 hurling side. He joined the senior panel during the 1975 championship. Fogarty was an unused substitute during his career and ended his playing days without silverware.

At club level Fogarty was a one-time championship medallist with Moyne–Templetuohy.

Mid Tipperary Senior Hurling Championship: 1970, 1972, 1976, 1977 Fogarty retired from inter-county hurling following the conclusion of the 1976 championship.

In retirement from playing, Fogarty became involved in team management and coaching. After acting as coach and selector with the Tipperary minor and under-21 teams, he later managed both Tipperary and Offaly.

== Honours ==
=== Player ===
Moyne–Templetuohy

- Tipperary Senior Hurling Championship (1): 1971
- Mid Tipperary Senior Hurling Championship: 1970, 1972, 1976, 1977

St Patrick's College, Thurles

- Higher Education Hurling League (Runners Up): 1976

=== Manager ===
Galway

- Munster Under-21 Hurling Championship (1): 1972

== Academic and clerical career ==
Fr. Fogarty B.A., M.A., has served as the president of St. Patrick's College, Thurles, since May 2004, having been a lecturer in Pastoral Theology, and Vice-President of St. Patrick's College from 1993 to 1995. Diocesan Secretary and Chancellor of the Archdiocese of Cashel and Emly from 1989 to 1997. He has presided over St. Patrick's College, Thurles, as it developed into a College of Education, developing links with the Tipperary Institute, the University of Limerick and now to its incorporation into Mary Immaculate College.

== Publications ==
- Celebrating the Spirit in our Midst: Spirituality for our Times Published by St. Patrick's College, Thurles, 2005.
- "Has Sport replaced Religion?", Intercom, published by Veritas Group, May 2009;
- "Is Sport the new Religion?", Intercom, published by Veritas Group, June 2009.

Sporting positions
Preceded by Babs Keating	Tipperary Senior Hurling Manager; 1994-1996	Succeeded by Len Gaynor
Preceded by Michael Bond	Offaly Senior Hurling Manager; 2001-2002	Succeeded by Mike McNamara
