= MIC, St. Patrick's Campus, Thurles =

College in Tiperary, Ireland

MIC, St Patrick's Campus, Thurles
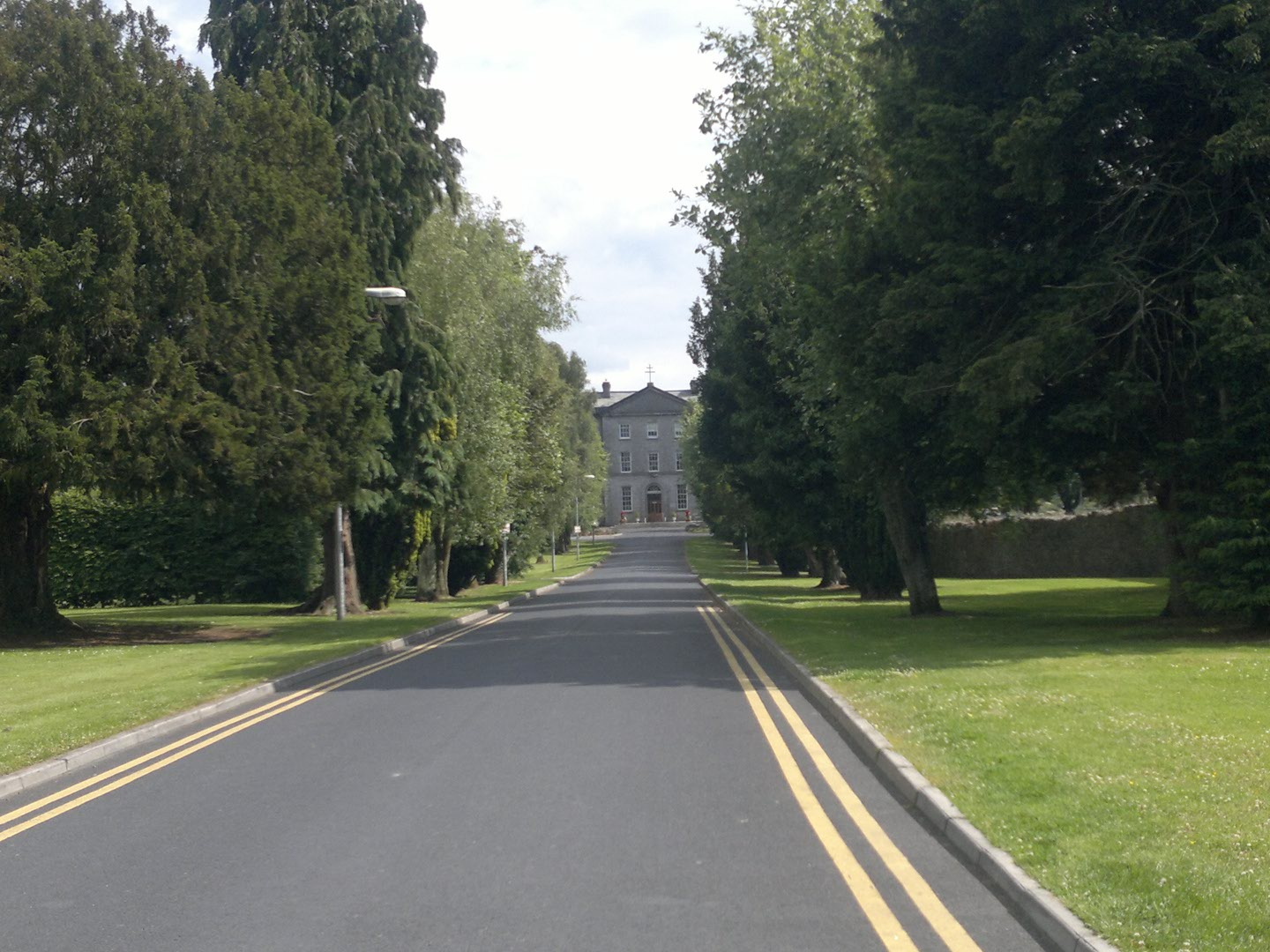
- Former name: St. Patrick's College
- Motto: Latin: Renovabitur sicut aquilae Juventus tua
- Motto in English: 'Your youth will be renewed like the eagle'(Psalm 103: 5)
- Type: College of education
- Established: 1837; 189 years ago as St Patrick's College
- Religious affiliation: Roman Catholic
- Academic affiliations: Mary Immaculate College (since 2015) University of Limerick (since 2011) NCEA/HETAC (since 1977); Maynooth (1973–2002); University of London (1849–1870)
- President: Prof. Dermot Nestor
- Dean: Prof. Jennifer Johnston
- Faculty: 30
- Students: 600+
- Location: Cathedral Street, Thurles, Ireland
- Website: www.mic.ul.ie/school-education-post-primary

Mary Immaculate College, (MIC) St. Patrick's Campus, Thurles is a third-level college of education in Thurles, County Tipperary. Formerly a seminary, the college specialises in humanities courses in accounting, business studies, Irish and religious studies.

== History ==
MIC, Thurles was founded in 1837 as St. Patrick's College. The college is a charitable institution operating under the patronage of the Dr. Patrick Everard, Archbishop of Cashel and Emly. Dr. Everard died in 1821 and left £10,000 "for the purpose of founding a college to provide a liberal education of Catholic youth destined for the priesthood and professional/business careers". The architect who won the competition to build the college was Charles Frederick Anderson (1802–1869).

The college was built on church land bought from a local Protestant minister, the first stone was laid by Dr. Robert Laffan Archbishop of Cashel, on 6 July 1829, in the presence of Daniel O'Connell.

The college opened as an educational institution in September 1837, to day-students and boarders, offering second-level education in the humanities, with a limited contribution from the sciences, to students wishing to prepare for priesthood as well as careers in business and other professions.

In 1842, a philosophy department was added to the college, and with some students becoming candidates for the priesthood for the first time. Prevailing poverty and hardship caused by the Famine temporarily inhibited the development of St. Patrick's College. However, by the middle of the 1860s, the college had developed into a major seminary with the addition of a full theological faculty.

In 1842, Archbishop of Cashel Michael Slattery established a foreign mission department in St. Patrick's College, Thurles, many of its graduates going to the United States, Australia and New Zealand.

In 1849, the University of London allowed Thurles to offer degrees in arts and laws, following an example from St. Patrick's College, Carlow. The relationship with London University lasted over 20 years. In 1875, the college was linked to the Catholic University of Ireland, and subsequently the Royal University of Ireland in the 1900s, before being linked with the Pontifical University in Maynooth.

In 1850, a synod of bishops met in Thurles, the first since the Middle Ages.

Lay students attended the college from its opening in 1837 up until 1907. Although lay students stopped being boarders in 1873, by 1907 only 20 lay students were enrolled.

In 1965 a new wing was opened by Archbishop of Cashes, and former Thurles professor Rev Dr. Morris, the new building included College Oratory, students' rooms and an assembly hall.

From 1973, students were able to qualify with diplomas in theology from Pontifical University in Maynooth. This programme developed into a degree (Bachelor of Theology) and was available under the Pontifical University via the CAO system until 2002.

In 1977, a National Certificate in Philosophical Studies was awarded by the National Council for Educational Awards (NCEA).

From 1909 to 1986, priests from the local Pallotine college in Thurles trained at St. Patrick's, also from 1950 until recent years the Mercy Sisters lived and worked in the college. College president James Ryan was instrumental the pallotines coming to Thurles in 1909, following he left his house to the pallotines, and they moved in there in 1943.

In 1988, after a gap of 81 years, lay students were readmitted, and the college had its courses validated by the National Council for Educational Awards (NCEA), such as the BA in theology which allowed graduates to teach in secondary schools, and since 2001 when the NCEA was replaced by the Higher Education and Training Awards Council (HETAC) has validated the colleges degree courses.

In 2002, the college ceased to function as a seminary, the college would have ordained over 1,500 men for the priesthood. The college also joined the Irish governments CAO system for the allocation of college places for leaving certificate students, also Irish students became eligible for free fees and grants. In 2004 new structured undergraduate education degrees commenced in association with Tipperary Institute.

On 5 February 2012, RTE broadcast their Sunday Mass service from St. Patrick's to celebrate its 175th anniversary; there was also a civic reception in Thurles to mark the anniversary.

== Sports ==
The St. Patrick's Campus has a full-scale Gaelic Athletic Association (GAA) pitch onsite and a handball alley. The Thurles College naturally always had a connection to the GAA, and in recent years there was the St. Patricks College GAA Scholarship Award for degree students.

=== Hurling ===
St. Patrick's College, Thurles has won the Higher Education Colleges Fergal Maher Cup on two occasions, in 2011 and 2013, they also were runners up in 1989 and 2012. In 2023 the college were the winners of the Ryan Cup for the first time in their history. The Camogie team won the O'Mhaolagáin Shield in 2015. Since incorporation into MIC, they compete as Mary Immaculate College, Thurles.

== Past students and people associated with the college ==
Over 1500 priests were ordained from Thurles, a large number of former students of the college became priests and bishops in other countries as was the focus of the seminary for many years, such as Dr. James Byrne (Toowoomba, Australia), Dr. Lawrence Scanlan (Bishop of Salt Lake City) and Dr. John Cantwell (first Archbishop of Los Angeles), Dr. Thomas Flanagan (Bishop of San Antonio).

Others associated with Irish parishes include Canon Edmond Kelly, a Military Chaplain and Parish Priest in Killenaule, Archbishop of Cashel & Emly Dr. Thomas Morris DD, who taught at the college from 1942 until 1960, Bishops Dr. Michael Russell former professor of moral theology and sacred eloquence (1948–1965) as well as vice-president (1962–1965), and former college president Dr. William Lee of Waterford. Bishop Thomas F. Quinlan of Borrisoleigh spent over four years in the college before joining the Columban Missionary Society. The Scottish-born Bishop of Argyll & the Isles, Scotland, Brian McGee trained in Thurles.

Canon John Hayes the founder of Muintir na Tíre studied in Thurles for a time. John Finucane, Home Rule MP for East County Limerick from 1885 to 1900 studied at the college, taking first honours in rhetoric, logic and metaphysic. The Nationalist MP for Tipperary South from 1900 to 1918 John Cullinan also studied at the college. Rev. Thomas R. Power (1860–1920) was vice president and professor of mathematics at St Patrick's from 1888 to 1911. Denis Keogh Member of the Queensland parliament was a student in Thurles.

=== Presidents of St. Patrick's College, Thurles ===
Rev. Dr. Thomas O'Connor was the first president (1837–1847) when the college opened with just 18 students. Presidents of the college have included Dr. Patrick Leahy (1847–1857), who negotiated the colleges affiliation to the University of London in 1848, Rev. Edmund Ryan, Canon Arthur Ryan (1887–1903), Dean and Professor from 1876, Monsignor James J. Ryan J.C.B. (Lovan.), professor of church history from (1878–1903), vice-president (188?–1903) and president (1903–1914), Ryan was responsible for the pallotines coming to Thurles (leaving them his house), reestablishment of the Irish College in Louvain and he also bought Glenstal Abbey for the benedictines, Canon Garret Cotter, Rev. Michael J Ryan (1920–1925), Rev. Nicholas Cooke (1925–1936), Rev. Daniel M. Ryan, Rev. Francis Ryan (1957–19??), Rev. Canon Augustine O'Donnell (1972–1987), Dr. William Lee (1987–1993) Mgr. Christy O'Dwyer MA (1993–2004) and Fr. Tom Fogarty BA, MA, (2004–2015). Fr. Fogarty is also a former manager of both the Tipperary and Offaly hurling teams.

Starting in 1970 every five years the college hosts an international reunion of former students from Ireland and abroad who studied for the priesthood in Thurles.

== Present ==
Today MIC, Thurles offers the following degrees:

- BA in education, Business Studies and Accounting
- BA in education, Business Studies And Religious Studies
- BA in education, Gaeilge and Religious Studies
- BA in education, Gaeilge and Business Studies
- BA in education, Mathematics and Gaeilge
- BA in education, Home Economics and Business Studies
- BA in education, Mathematics and Business Studies

The undergraduate education degrees are recognised by the teaching council of Ireland enabling graduates to teach in secondary schools in Ireland.

Over recent years refurbishments have taken place to lecture halls, tutorial rooms, library, old research library, computing facilities, playing pitch and the refectory as well as to the college's residential area and conference facilities.

As well as the academic course the college runs a number of courses in pastoral care, youth work and Irish language training courses for adults.

In 2012, the college celebrated its 175th anniversary, and were honoured by a civic reception by Thurles Town Council held in the Source Library.

=== University of Limerick alliance ===
Starting from September 2011, teaching degree programmes at St. Patrick's College are accredited by the University of Limerick, and graduates from 2012 on wards have been awarded degrees from the university.

The degrees awarded are BEd with Irish and religious studies and BEd with business studies and religious studies. Graduates are registered with the Teaching Council of Ireland and are qualified to teach to Leaving Certificate standard. Participants are also covered by the Government Free Fees Initiative.

=== Incorporation into Mary Immaculate College ===
In September 2016 a new deal was agreed which will see the 3rd level institution work with Mary Immaculate College in becoming a linked provider to the Limerick Centre of Excellence. The incorporation into Mary Immaculate has seen the college re-branded as MIC St. Patrick's Campus, Thurles.

=== The Irish Institute for Pastoral Studies ===
Founded in 2016, following the incorporation of MIC and St. Patrick's College, Irish Institute for Pastoral Studies is based at the MIC St. Patrick's Campus. The institute supports faith formation and the pastoral mission of the church today. The Institute of Pastoral Studies collaborates with the Center for Mission Studies, the Diocese of Ossory and Maynooth College in providing the Aspal platform for those involved in ministry.

=== Graduation ===
19 October 2012 saw the first students graduate with University of Limerick degrees which were presented by University of Limerick President Professor Don Barry. The second conferring by UL took place on 18 October 2013. The 2014 ceremony took place on 17 October in St. Patrick's, in attendance were the academic staff of the college and representatives of the University of Limerick, as well as students family and friends in attendance.

Similarly in the past graduation took place on campus each autumn with academic staff, representatives of HETAC, figures from other educational institutions and local public figures, as well as students family and friends in attendance.

== Publications ==
- Luceat – is an annual magazine produced by the college
