= Tomás Heneghan =

Irish activist

Tomás Heneghan is an Irish activist notable for leading legal challenges for the expansion of the electorate for Seanad Éireann and for gay men to be allowed to donate blood.

In 2019, Heneghan brought a High Court challenge to the law limiting the right to vote for members of the Seanad to graduates of the University of Dublin, the National University of Ireland, members of local authorities, TDs and outgoing senators. After his case was rejected by the High Court in 2021, Heneghan won an appeal in the Irish Supreme Court in 2023, resulting in the expansion of the franchise for the election of six senators to graduates of all higher education institutions in the state.

Heneghan had previously brought legal challenges in the High Court against the lifelong ban on men who have sex with men donating blood in Ireland in 2015 and the subsequent 12-month ban in 2019. As of November 2022, all prospective blood donors in Ireland are assessed using an individualised assessment that centres individual risk activity.

In September 2025, Heneghan received a UL Alumni award for Outstanding Contribution to society.

== Early life ==
Heneghan is from County Galway and attended the University of Limerick.

== Blood donation ==
Heneghan began donating blood at the age of 18 and had been an active donor until 2013, when he was suspended from giving blood following an anonymous query to the Irish Blood Transfusion Service regarding his sexual history.

In July 2015, Heneghan was granted leave by the Irish High Court to bring a judicial review challenge to the rules on blood donation which prohibited for life any man who had ever had oral or anal sex with another man donating blood in Ireland. A year later, in July 2016, Heneghan withdrew his case when the blood service announced it would be ending the lifelong deferral policy and this had been accepted by the Minister for Health. When the new policy came into effect in January 2017, Heneghan returned to donating blood, but criticised the new policy of deferring any man who had had oral or anal sex with another man in the 12 months prior to donating blood.

Dissatisfied with the rules introduced in 2017, Heneghan returned to the High Court in May 2019 to challenge the rules and was again given leave to bring a judicial review. In December 2021, the Irish Blood Transfusion Service announced it would be lifting the 12-month deferral policy on phased basis, first reducing the deferral period to 4 months, then eventually moving to an individualised risk assessment system for all donors.

== Seanad franchise ==
As a University of Limerick graduate, Heneghan had not been permitted to vote in elections for Seanad Éireann. This was not the case for graduates of the University of Dublin and the National University of Ireland. In December 2019, Heneghan sought leave from the High Court to bring a judicial review against the refusal of the state to register him to vote in Seanad elections, either on the university panels or the vocational panels. He initially brought his case a lay litigant, but was later represented by the Free Legal Advice Centres.

Following a two-day hearing by a three-judge High Court in March 2021, the case was rejected in November that year. Later that month, Heneghan confirmed he would seek a leapfrog appeal directly to the Irish Supreme Court.

In March 2023, following a two-day hearing in October 2022, the Supreme Court accepted the appeal, finding that the law restricting the franchise to graduates of the University of Dublin and the National University of Ireland was unconstitutional.

== See also ==
- LGBT rights in the Republic of Ireland
