= Shannon Applied Biotechnology Centre =

Irish research institute

Centre for Applied Bioscience Research
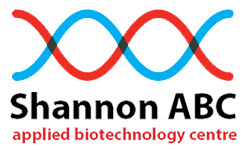
- Logo for the Shannon Applied Biotechnology Centre
- Abbreviation: CABR

The Centre for Applied Bioscience Research (Formerly Shannon Applied Biotechnology Centre) is a partnership between the Munster Technological University (MTU) and Technological University of the Shannon: Midlands Midwest (TUS:MM,) and is co-located between these research institutes in Ireland. CABR applies bioprocessing to a variety of different source materials to derive added value from them in the area of biological products (e.g. anti-oxidants, anti-microbials, immunomodulators, value added food, waste optimisation, etc.)

== Background ==
CABR was established through core funding from Enterprise Ireland as an Applied Research Enhancement Centre and continues to enjoy support from this organisation as well as:

- Environmental Protection Agency (Ireland)
- Higher Education Authority
- Irish Research Council for Science, Engineering and Technology
- Technological Sector Research Strand I & III
- Food Institutional Research Measure
- Sustainable Energy Authority of Ireland

CABR has a large multidisciplinary team of research scientists, experienced in the commercial application of science through industry collaboration. In addition to the identification of bioactive molecules through bioprocessing, CABR also provides a contract research facility to companies who wish to optimise scientific processes within their company.

In July 2010 CABR formed a strategic life sciences cluster with the Pharmaceutical & Molecular Biotechnology Research Centre (PMBRC) and the Ion Channel Biotechnology Centre (ICBC). This cluster was developed with the intention of providing further expertise to industry while taking advantage of complementary capabilities in the centres.

== Industry collaboration ==
The key aim of CABR is to assist in the continued prosperity of industry by offering access to wide-ranging expertise and know how, state of the art equipment and facilities and access to a wide variety of national and international funding programmes.

CABR provides biotechnology services on a range of levels. Companies can use Enterprise Ireland funded schemes (such as Innovation Vouchers and Innovation Partnerships) to carry out research, or they can fund the work themselves as contract research.

Industry partners include those from a range of industries, including: Food, Agriculture, Marine, Pharmaceutical, Healthcare, Cosmetics, etc.

== Research ==
Funding from Enterprise Ireland for the initial period of existence of CABR provided for the development of niche expertise areas of the Centre, as well as providing for a critical mass of experienced, commercially focused researchers. Initial waste streams that were mined included spent yeast, horse chestnut waste and fish waste. A further area of expertise includes investigation of raw materials, such as seaweed, for a variety of bioactive compounds.

From these core activities the Centre has developed a bioactivity screening process applicable to any natural waste process or product. In the absence of bioactivity, competencies within the Centre can be used to recommend other ways to add value to waste processes.

== Bioactive compounds ==
A key research, development and innovation area for CABR are bioactive molecules. Bioactive molecules are those derived from biological origin that exhibit an active effect, and can include anti-oxidants, immunomodulatory compounds, anti microbials, prebiotics, etc. Bioactive molecules are extracted by traditional solvent extraction techniques or by super critical fluid extraction. Activity can then be screened for and molecules of interest identified.
