= Limerick Institute of Technology =

Former higher educational institution

- Institiúid Teicneolaíochta Luimnigh
- Crest of the institute of technology
- Former name: Limerick Technical College
- Motto: English: Active Leadership in Education, Enterprise and Engagement
- Type: Public
- Active: 1975–16 July 2021
- President: Vincent Cunnane
- Academic staff: 500+
- Students: 6,900+
- Location: Moylish Park, Limerick, Munster, V94 EC5T, Republic of Ireland; 52°40′29″N 8°38′55″W
- Colours: Red and white
- Website: lit.ie

The Limerick Institute of Technology (LIT; Irish: Institiúid Teicneolaíochta Luimnigh) was an institute of technology, located in Limerick, Ireland. The institute had five campuses that were located in Limerick, Thurles, Clonmel, as well as a regional learning centre in Ennis. The main campus was located at Moylish Park in Limerick adjacent to Thomond Park and housed the Faculty of Applied Science, Engineering and Technology and the School of Business and Humanities. The School of Art & Design is located at the Clare Street and Clonmel campuses.

The institute offered courses from level 6 (certificate) through level 10 (PhD) whilst also catering for craft apprentices and adult and continuing education. The institute had twice been named as The Sunday Times Institute of Technology of the Year in The Sunday Times University Guide, firstly in 2008 and again in 2013.

A consortium between the Athlone Institute of Technology and itself was announced with the intention of forming a technological university. On 23 November 2020, the AIT-LIT Consortium announced that the joint Limerick-Athlone IT application for Technological University status had been submitted for government approval, which was granted in May 2021. On 16 July 2021, the institute of technology was officially dissolved and succeeded by the Technological University of the Shannon: Midlands Midwest, which began operations on 1 October 2021.

== History ==
The Limerick Institute of Technology (LIT) can trace its roots back to the School of Ornamental Art on Leamy Street, Limerick, on 3 July 1852. This re-opened in 1855 on Cecil Street under the auspices of the Limerick Athenaeum, founded by William Lane Joynt. The Limerick Athenaeum was part of an international movement for the promotion of artistic and scientific learning, started by John Wilson Croker at the Athenaeum Club in London in 1823.

The trustees of the Limerick Athenaeum handed the building over to Limerick Corporation in 1896 in order to administer the property for the advancement of artistic and technical education in Limerick. This brought the tradition of fusing artistic and technical education into the public domain, a tradition that had been retained and refined by the institute.

For much of the history of the school, it was constituted as the Municipal Technical Institute (known locally as The Red Tech) which was opened in 1910. By the 1970s, it had grown to such a degree that a new campus had to be acquired in Moylish for technical education, with artistic education continuing in a number of locations in the city centre.

The Limerick City Vocational Education Committee (VEC) founded the college in 1975 as the Limerick Technical College. The institute was constituted as the Limerick College of Art, Commerce and Technology (Limerick CoACT) in 1980, became a regional technical college in 1993, and finally an institute of technology in 1997.

Moylish had since developed into the main campus of the Limerick Institute of Technology, with the Limerick School of Art and Design located at both the Moylish campus and the Clare Street campus since 2008.

In 2012, LIT merged with the Tipperary Institute, which had been founded in 1998. This merger brought two new campus locations in Thurles and Clonmel, as well as increased the institution's footprint across the region. This footprint was further extended in Clare when the institute introduced degree-level education at its Ennis Learning Centre in 2016. In 2017, the institute was granted planning permission for a new campus at Coonagh in Limerick, to be focused on teaching and research in engineering.

Pat MacDonagh served as head of the college from 1978 through its evolution. He resigned as director in 2003. Dr. Maria Hinfelaar joined in 2004 as president, serving for 11 years. In 2016, Vincent Cunnane was appointed president of the institute.

=== AIT-LIT Consortium and dissolution ===
In October 2019, a consortium between the Athlone Institute of Technology and itself was announced with the intention of forming a technological university. On 23 November 2020, the AIT-LIT Consortium announced that the joint Limerick-Athlone IT application for technological university (TU) status had been submitted for approval. Approval was announced in May 2021 by minister of Higher Education, Simon Harris. On 31 August 2021, it was announced that outgoing LIT president Vincent Cunnane would be appointed as the new technological university's first president.

On 16 July 2021, both the Athlone Institute of Technology and itself were officially dissolved through a signed order by the minister. The institute was succeeded by the Technological University of the Shannon: Midlands Midwest, which began operations on 1 October 2021.

== Organisation ==
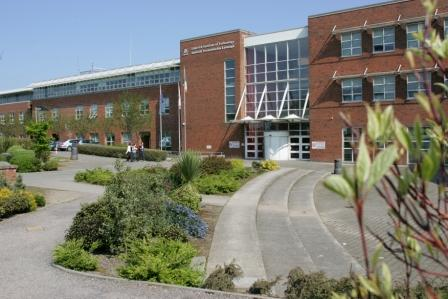
Limerick Institute of Technology – Moylish Park

The institute was divided into four Schools, each with constituent departments:

- Limerick School of Art & Design
  - Department of Design
  - Department of Fine Art
  - Department of Digital Arts & Media
- Applied Sciences & Technology
  - Department of Applied Science
  - Department of Applied Social Sciences
  - Department of Information Technology
- Business & Humanities
  - Department of Business & Financial Services
  - Department of Marketing, Enterprise & Digital Communications
  - Department of Sport, Leisure and Tourism
- Engineering & Built Environment
  - Department of Built Environment
  - Department of Electrical & Electronic Engineering
  - Department of Mechanical & Automobile Engineering

The Development Office worked with the registrar and heads of school/department to address the widening participation agenda in the broadest sense from level 6 to level 10 as per the National Framework of Qualifications by piloting new initiatives and then assisting to mainstream these initiatives within LIT. The Development Office activity included: enhancing R&D and Technology Transfer; managing relationships with second-level education providers; Lifelong Learning; and liaison with enterprise and employment development agencies in the mid-west region.

== Enterprise and research ==
One of LIT's attributes were its co-location of enterprise campuses with all of its education campuses.

The Enterprise Acceleration Centre (EAC) is an incubation facility for start-up companies, with particular emphasis on export and growth-focused businesses. The centre is located on the Moylish Park campus and is 1,350 m^{2} with 18 self-contained units. Client companies can rent office suites and avail of management development supports, including one-to-one business coaching, peer networking and research collaboration. The centre works with enterprise support agencies, including Enterprise Ireland and County & City Enterprise Boards and is a Microsoft BizSpark Network Partner.

The Shannon Applied Biotechnology Centre (SABC) is based on the main campus and is a joint venture between LIT and the Institute of Technology, Tralee.

== Sports ==
LIT had a focus on sport with basketball, hurling and rugby being the most dominant. Most recently, LIT's men's basketball team won All Ireland Division 3 championship in 2016, and All Ireland Division 2 championship in 2019. The players of the man's basketball team are commonly referred to as 'Champs'. The institute senior hurling team captured the Fitzgibbon Cup in 2005 and 2007 and the senior rugby team captured the All-Ireland Colleges Championship in 1998, 1999 and 2005.

One of the largest sports clubs in the institute is the Outdoor Club. This was founded in 2001 and runs on the philosophy "alternative activities for all". It caters for all students, past and present interested in non-competitive activities such as hillwalking, orienteering, mountaineering, canoeing/kayaking, rock climbing, windsurfing, surfing, caving, sailing, and mountain biking.

LIT had a number of sports-related courses with programmes in strength and conditioning being run at its Thurles campus, in partnership with the online sports college Setanta College, and the Department of Humanities offers a level 8-degree in Business Studies with Sports Management.

== Millennium Theatre ==
The Millennium Theatre is located at Moylish Park and is host to a variety of live entertainment, concerts, recitals, drama, comedy and dance, with a capacity of 400. It also acts as a learning space for students in a number of disciplines, including music and sound production.

== Accommodation ==
There have been several notable student villages to accommodate students attending the institute, with the largest ones being Thomond Village and Cratloe Wood Student Village.

== Notable alumni ==
- Pat Breen, Minister of State at the Department of Jobs, Enterprise and Innovation, 2016–2020
- Amanda Coogan, performance artist
- Pat Shortt, actor, comedian, writer and entertainer
- Diarmaid Byrnes, hurler
- Joe Canning, hurler

== See also ==
- Education in the Republic of Ireland
- List of higher education institutions in the Republic of Ireland
