= James J. Ryan =

James J. Ryan (1851–May 9, 1939) was an Irish Catholic priest in the diocese of Cashel, who served as president of St. Patrick's College, Thurles (1903–1914). Ryan also funded the establishment of Glenstal Abbey, inviting the Pallottine order to establish a presence in Thurles, and funded the re-establishment of the Irish College in Louvain. Born in The Furze, Thurles, Co. Tipperary, in 1851, he went to Louvain to train for the priesthood from 1873; ordained in 1876, he was awarded the degree of J.C.B. (Louvain) before continuing his studies in Rome.

Returning to Ireland in 1879, Ryan took up a position as a professor of church history, at St. Patrick's College, Thurles, the Cashel Diocesan Seminary, before becoming vice-president and, in 1903, president of the college, a position he held until 1914. In 1909, with the support of the Archbishop of Cashel, Rev. Dr. Fennelly, he invited the Pallottine order to set up in Thurles, with their students studying at St. Patrick's College. When he died in 1939, he left his residence to the order.

== Glenstal Abbey ==
Reportedly a wealthy man, Ryan purchased Glenstal Castle for £2000 in 1927 from Sir Charles Barrington, where he resided for some time, promising it to the Benedictine order if they set up a monastery there, which they eventually availed of. Initially, there were some discussions between the order and Ryan, who wanted to maintain room and hunting and fishing rights on the property, as well as the order considering other locations such as Kylemore.

== Re-establishment of the Irish College, Louvain ==
Ryan was involved in the re-establishment of the Franciscan Irish College, in Louvain, St.Anthony's College, Leuven, which had no longer been in theIrish or the order's possession, since the French Revolution. With his friend from their university days in Louvain, Cardinal Désiré-Joseph Mercier, and helped by funding from Irish-born American philanthropist Marquis Martin Maloney. He purchased the property on behalf of the Irish Franciscans in 1923 (for legal reasons it was nominally under the ownership of the Catholic University of Louvain), worked to have the property repaired after damage from the Great War, and restored the memorial stones of the Irish buried there.

Ryan died at his residence, The Hermitage, Cabra, Thurles, on May 9, 1939.
