= County and City Enterprise Board =

Ireland's County & City Enterprise Boards (CCEBs) ran from 1993 to 2014. They were established in 1993 as companies limited by guarantee, during a period of high unemployment (15.1%) and limited business opportunities. They were given statutory status under the Industrial Development Act of 1995. The 35 boards were created to stimulate economic development and to cultivate an ethos of local entrepreneurship. They were dissolved on 14 April 2014, and their functions, assets and liabilities were transferred to Enterprise Ireland, with Local Enterprise Offices established within local to deliver these functions

== Functions ==
The Enterprise Boards were established to "fill the gap in the support services for local enterprises" and to "develop indigenous potential and stimulate economic activity at local level primarily through the provision of financial and technical support for the development of small enterprises".

The primary goals of each enterprise board were designed to stimulate and promote local enterprise culture and entrepreneurship and to assist new business start ups, particularly through the provision of financial assistance.

The Irish economy has always relied heavily on its exports and in that respect, the County & City Enterprise Boards were intended to support those companies with a potential export capacity. Once a company reached its export potential, Enterprise Ireland would incubate that company going forward. Ireland also depends on its indigenous small and medium enterprises, (SMEs) for internal economic growth. These companies were the primary target for CEB support.

== Organisation ==
Each board was made up of voluntary members representing the local council, local or national agencies and local community interests. The boards employed a small number of staff who deliver board supports in the locality.

== Funding ==
=== Funding to the Boards ===
Funding for the Boards was provided by the Department of Enterprise, Trade and Employment through the CEB Central Co-Ordination Unit under the National Development Plan 2007–2013 (NDP). Part of this funding came from the Exchequer and part from the European Regional Development Fund through the two Regional Assemblies: the South and East Region, and the Border, Midlands and West Region.

=== Funding available from the Boards ===
The CEBs supported the development of Micro-enterprises at local level. The CEBs could support individuals, firms and community groups provided that the proposed projects had the capacity to achieve commercial viability. The CEBs could provide both financial and non-financial assistance to a project promoter. The forms of financial assistance which were available, subject to certain restrictions, included Capital Grants, Employment Grants and Feasibility study Grants. The provision of non-financial assistance could take the form of a wide range of business advice and information services, management capability and development programmes and e-Commerce training initiatives.
