= Seanad Éireann =

Upper house of the Oireachtas (Irish parliament)

Coordinates: 53.34055°N 6.254021°W

- 27th Seanad
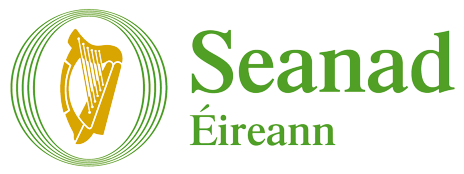

Type
- Type: Senate of the Oireachtas

History
- Established: 29 December 1937 (Modern form)
- Preceded by: Irish Free State Seanad
- New session started: 12 February 2025

Leadership
- Cathaoirleach: Mark Daly, FF since 12 February 2025
- Leas-Chathaoirleach: Maria Byrne, FG since 19 February 2025
- Leader of the Seanad: Garret Ahearn, FG since 17 June 2026
- Deputy leader: Fiona O'Loughlin, FF since 12 February 2025
- Opposition leader: Conor Murphy, SF since 12 February 2025

Structure
- Seats: 60
- Political groups: Government (36) Fianna Fáil (19) Fine Gael (17) Opposition (24) Sinn Féin (6) Independent Group (8) (Note: Technical group formed for speaking rights. This is not a political alliance, but a parliamentary group.) Independent (8) (Note: Includes Rónán Mullen who is a member of the Human Dignity Alliance party but was elected as an independent candidate.) Civil Engagement (4) Independent (4) Cross-Party Group (4) Labour (2) Green (1) Social Democrats (1) Aontú (1) Independent (1)
- Committees: 6: Administration; Consolidation Bills; Members' Interests of Seanad Éireann; Parliamentary Privileges and Oversight (Seanad); Seanad Public Consultation; Selection
- Joint committees: 20: Agriculture, Food and the Marine; Autism; Children, Disability, Equality, Integration, and Youth; Disability Matters; Education, Further and Higher Education, Research, Innovation, and Science; Enterprise, Trade and Employment; Environment and Climate Action; European Union Affairs; Finance, Public Expenditure and Reform, and Taoiseach; Foreign Affairs and Defence; Gender Equality; Implementation of the Good Friday Agreement; Irish Language, Gaeltacht and the Irish-speaking Community; Health; Housing, Local Government and Heritage; Justice; Public Petitions; Social Protection, Community and Rural Development and the Islands; Transport and Communications; Tourism, Culture, Arts, Sport and Media
- Length of term: No more than 5 years
- Authority: Articles 18−19, Constitution of Ireland
- Salary: €79,614 per year plus expenses

Elections
- Voting system: Indirect election (Note: 6 seats elected by graduates of DU and NUI, 43 seats elected indirectly, and 11 are nominated by the Taoiseach.)
- Last election: 29−30 January 2025
- Next election: 2030

Meeting place
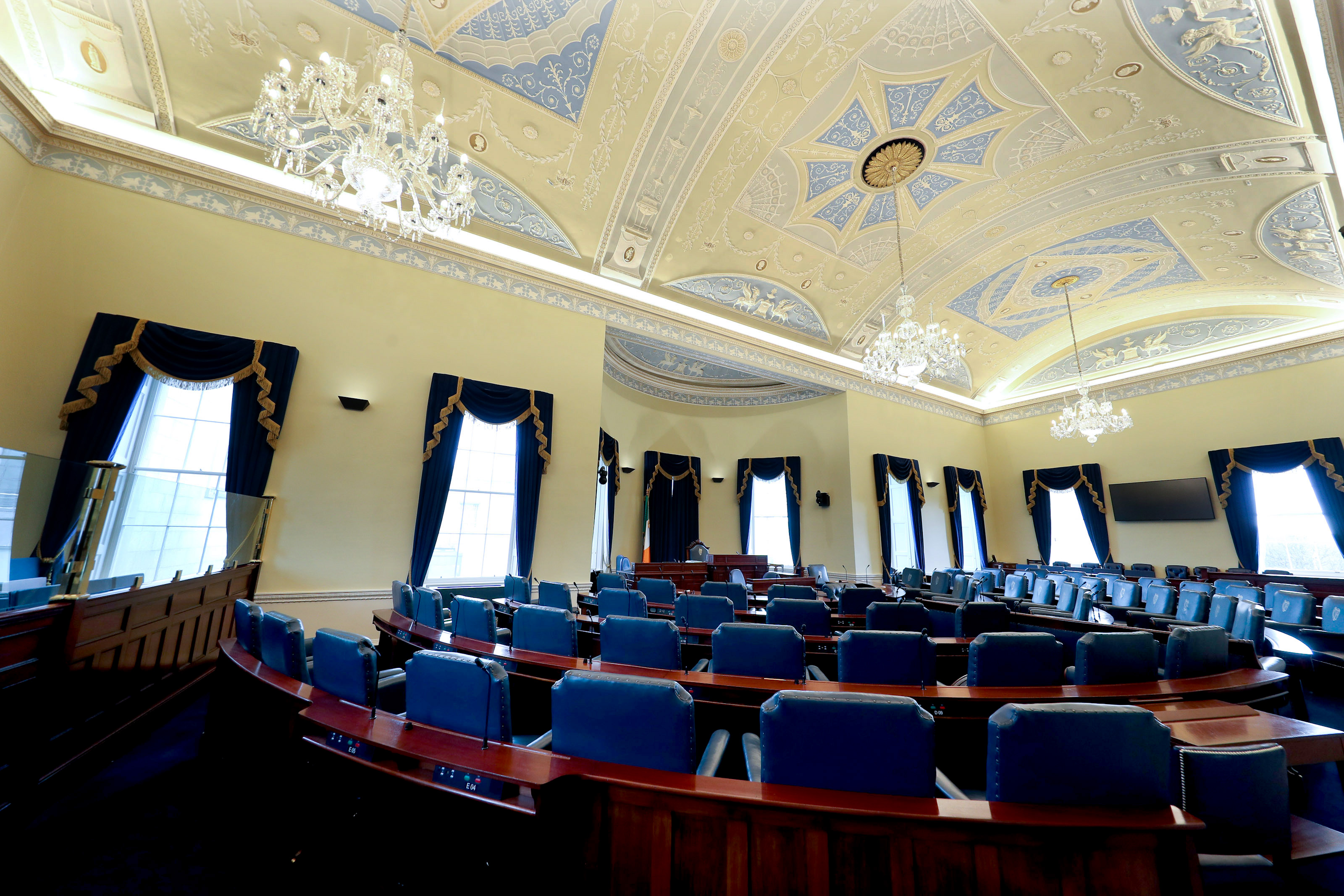
- Seanad Chamber; Leinster House, Kildare Street, Dublin

Website
- www.oireachtas.ie

Constitution
- Constitution of Ireland

Rules
- Seanad Éireann – Standing Orders Relative to Public Business 2026

Seanad Éireann (/ˈʃænəd ˈɛərən, ˈʃænəð/ SHAN-əd(h) AIR-ən; Irish: [ˈʃan̪ˠəd̪ˠ ˈeːɾʲən̪ˠ]; "Senate of Ireland") is the upper house of the Oireachtas (the Irish legislature), which also comprises the President of Ireland and Dáil Éireann (the lower house).

It is commonly called the Seanad and its members are known as senators (Irish: seanadóirí, singular: seanadóir). Unlike the Dáil, it is not directly elected but consists of a mixture of members chosen by various methods. Its powers are more limited than those of the Dáil. New legislation can be initiated in the Seanad, but this may not include money bills or bills to amend the Constitution. Where a bill is rejected by the Seanad, the Dáil may deem it have been passed by the Seanad after 180 days. Since its establishment, it has been located in Leinster House.

== Composition ==
Under Article 18 of the Constitution of Ireland, Seanad Éireann consists of 60 senators, composed as follows:

- Eleven nominated by the Taoiseach.
- Six elected in university constituencies by the graduates of certain Irish universities:
  - Three by graduates of the Dublin University.
  - Three by graduates of the National University of Ireland.
  - At the next Seanad election after March 2025, the two university constituencies will be replaced with a single, six-member Higher Education constituency and its senators will be elected by graduates of 13 third-level institutions.
- Forty-three elected from five special panels of nominees (known as vocational panels) by an electorate consisting of TDs (members of Dáil Éireann), outgoing senators and members of city and county councils. Nomination is restrictive for the panel seats with only Oireachtas members and designated nominating bodies entitled to nominate:
  - Seven seats on the Administrative Panel: Public administration and social services (including the voluntary sector).
  - Eleven seats on the Agricultural Panel: Agriculture and the fisheries.
  - Five seats on the Cultural and Educational Panel: Education, the arts, the Irish language and Irish culture and literature.
  - Nine seats on the Industrial and Commercial Panel: Industry and commerce (including engineering and architecture).
  - Eleven seats on the Labour Panel: Labour (organised or otherwise).

Each of the five panels consists, in theory, of individuals possessing special knowledge of, or experience in, one of five specific fields. In practice the nominees are party members, often, though not always, failed or aspiring Dáil candidates.

The most senior member of Oireachtas staff supporting the work of the Seanad, is the Clerk of Seanad Éireann, currently Mr Martin Hughes, having been appointed by the Oireachtas Commission in November 2025.

The Clerk of the Seanad undertaken a similar role to his counterpart in the Dáil (the Clerk of Dáil Éireann) in terms of providing procedural advice to the Cathaoirleach and Members of the Senate on standing orders, parliamentary procedure and practice, as well as overseeing the staff and administration of the business of the Seanad in terms of its debates, publications and scrutiny of legislation.

=== Election ===
The general election for the Seanad occurs after a Dáil general election and not later than 90 days after the dissolution of the preceding Dáil. The election occurs under the system of proportional representation by means of the single transferable vote. Membership is open to all Irish citizens over 21, but a senator cannot also be a member of Dáil Éireann. As stated above, nomination to vocational panel is restricted; nomination in the university constituencies requires signatures of 10 graduates. The Taoiseach's nominations are made after the elected seats have been filled.

In the case of casual vacancies in the vocational panels, the electorate in the by-election consists of Oireachtas members only. Vacancies to the university seats are filled by the full electorate in that constituency. In by-elections to the forthcoming Higher Education vacancies will be filled through a list system.

=== Members of the 27th Seanad (2025–) ===
Party	Senators
Fianna Fáil	19
Fine Gael	17
Sinn Féin	6
Labour	2
Aontú	1
Green	1
Social Democrats	1
Independent	13
Total	60

== Powers ==
The Seanad is intended to play an advisory and revising role rather than to be an equal of the popularly elected Dáil. While notionally every Act of the Oireachtas must receive assent of both chambers, in practice the Seanad can only delay rather than veto decisions of the Dáil. The fact that 11 senators are appointed by the Taoiseach usually ensures that the Government, which must have the support of the Dáil, enjoys at least a plurality in the Seanad. The constitution imposes the following specific limitations on the powers of the Seanad:

- If a bill approved by the Dáil has not received the assent of the Seanad within 90 days, then the Dáil may, within a further 180 days, resolve that the measure is "deemed" to have been approved by the Seanad. This has only occurred twice since 1937, once in 1959 when the Seanad rejected the Third Amendment to the Constitution Bill 1958 (the amendment proposed by this bill was, in the event, rejected in the subsequent referendum) and again in 1964 when they rejected the Pawnbrokers Bill 1964. In both instances the Dáil passed the requisite motion deeming the legislation to have been passed.
- A money bill, such as the budget, may be deemed to have been approved by the Seanad after 21 days.
- In the case of an urgent bill, the time that must have expired before it can be deemed to have been approved by the Seanad may be abridged by the Government (cabinet) with the concurrence of the President (this does not apply to bills to amend the constitution).

The Constitution does, however, grant to the Seanad certain means by which it may defend its prerogatives against the Dáil:

- The Seanad may, by a resolution, ask the president to appoint a Committee of Privileges to adjudicate as to whether or not a particular bill is a money bill. The president may, however, refuse this request. This procedure has not been initiated since the re-establishment of the Seanad under the current Constitution in 1937.
- If a majority of senators and at least one-third of the members of the Dáil present a petition to the President stating that a bill is of great "national importance" the president can decline to sign the bill until it has been referred to the people. This means that the president can refuse to sign it until it has been approved either in an ordinary referendum or by the Dáil after it has reassembled after a general election.

== Activities ==
Seanad Éireann adopts its own standing orders and appoints its president, known as the Cathaoirleach. The Taoiseach appoints a senator to be Leader of the House and direct government business there. The Seanad establishes its own standing committees and select committee; senators also participate, along with TDs (members of the Dáil) in joint committees of the Oireachtas. A maximum of two senators may be ministers in the Government.

=== Standing committees ===
- Committee on Administration
- Committee on Consolidation Bills
- Committee of Selection
- Committee on Procedure and Privileges
  - Sub-committee on Compellability
- Committee on Members' Interests of Seanad Éireann

=== Select committees ===
- Select committee on Communications, Natural Resources and Agriculture
- Select committee on Environment, Transport, Culture and the Gaeltacht
- Select committee on European Union Affairs
- Select committee on Foreign Affairs and Trade
- Select committee on Finance, Public Expenditure and Reform
- Select committee on Health and Children
- Select committee on the Implementation of the Good Friday Agreement
- Select committee on Investigations, Oversight and Petitions
- Select committee on Jobs, Social Protection and Education
- Select committee on Justice, Defence and Equality

== Historical origins ==
=== Precursors ===
The first parliamentary upper house in Ireland was the House of Lords of the Parliament of Ireland, beginning in 1297. Like its British counterpart, this house consisted of hereditary nobles and bishops. After the abolition of the Irish Parliament under the Act of Union of 1800 no parliament existed in Ireland until the twentieth century.

In 1919 Irish nationalists established a unicameral legislature called Dáil Éireann. In 1920 the Parliament of Southern Ireland was established by British law with an upper house called the Senate. The Senate of Southern Ireland consisted of a mixture of Irish peers and government appointees. The Senate convened in 1921 but was boycotted by Irish nationalists and so never became fully operational. It was formally abolished with the establishment of the Irish Free State in 1922 but a number of its members were soon appointed to the new Free State senate.

=== Free State Seanad Éireann (1922–1936) ===
Under the Constitution of the Irish Free State, the Oireachtas consisted of the King and two Houses, Dáil Éireann (described as a Chamber of Deputies) and Seanad Éireann. The first Seanad consisted of a mixture of members appointed by the President of the Executive Council and members indirectly elected by the Dáil. W. T. Cosgrave agreed to use his appointments to grant extra representation to the state's Protestant minority. The procedures for election of senators were amended before the first Seanad election by the Constitution (Amendment No. 1) Act 1925. It was intended that eventually the entire membership of the Seanad would be directly elected. However, after only one election, in 1925, where 19 Seanad members were elected in one district using STV, this system was abandoned in favour of a form of indirect election.

Initially casual vacancies in the Seanad were filled by vote of the remaining members. However, this system was replaced under the Constitution (Amendment No. 11) Act 1929 by filling of vacancies by vote of both Dáil and Seanad, the system that continues today for panel members. The Free State Seanad was abolished entirely in 1936 after it delayed some Government proposals for constitutional changes.

=== Constitution of Ireland (since 1937) ===
The Constitution of Ireland which has been in operation since 29 December 1937 established the Oireachtas consisting of the president and two Houses, preserving the titles of the Houses which had been in place during the Irish Free State: Dáil Éireann (described as the House of Representatives) and Seanad Éireann. The Seanad convened under the new constitution was termed the 2nd Seanad (being considered a successor to the Free State Seanad), and first sat on 27 April 1938.

The system of vocational panels used to nominate candidates for the Seanad was inspired by the corporatist Catholic social teaching of the 1930s and, in particular, the 1931 papal encyclical Quadragesimo anno. In that document, Pope Pius XI argued that the Marxist concept of class conflict should be replaced with a vision of social order based on the co-operation and interdependence of society's various vocational groups.

== Calls for reform ==
Since 1928, twelve separate official reports have been published on reform of the Seanad. In the 1980s, the Progressive Democrats called for its abolition; however, in government, members of the party were nominated to the Seanad by the Taoiseach. The post-1937 body has been criticised on a number of grounds, including claims that it is weak and dominated by the Government of the day. There are also allegations of patronage in the selection of its members, with senators often being close allies of the Taoiseach or candidates who have failed to be elected to the Dáil. Many senators have subsequently been elected as TDs.

Some, like the pressure group Graduate Equality, argue that the franchise for electing university senators should be extended to the graduates of all third-level institutions. Others believe that this does not go far enough and that at least some portion of the Seanad should be directly elected by all adult citizens. Calls have also been made for the Seanad to be used to represent Irish emigrants or the people of Northern Ireland. In 1999 the Reform Movement called for some of the Taoiseach's nominations to be reserved for members of the Irish-British minority, and other minorities such as members of the Travelling Community and recently arrived immigrants.

=== Graduate franchise ===
The Seventh Amendment in 1979 altered the provisions of Article 18.4 to allow for a redistribution of the university seats to any other institutes of higher education in the state.

In 2019, Tomás Heneghan, a graduate of University of Limerick, challenged the limitation of voting rights to graduates of National University of Ireland, Trinity College Dublin, and to Oireachtas and local authority members. The case was heard by a three-judge division of the High Court in 2021. The challenge was rejected by the court later that year. On 31 March 2023, following a direct appeal on the point of university graduates voting, the seven-judge Supreme Court ruled in Heneghan's favour and struck down provisions of the Seanad Electoral (University Members) Act 1937 limiting the right to vote to NUI and Trinity College graduates. However, the court suspended its ruling to 31 July 2023 to allow the state to determine how it would institute the necessary changes to the law. On 26 July 2023, the Supreme Court gave a second ruling, allowing the Oireachtas up to 31 May 2025 to legislate for the expansion of the electorate.

The Seanad Electoral (University Members) (Amendment) Act 2024, enacted on 29 October 2024, abolishes the two three-seat National University of Ireland and Dublin University constituencies, and creates a new six-seat Higher Education constituency in which all degree-holders from third-level state institutions of higher education will be entitled to vote at the next Seanad general election after 21 March 2025. The legislation also replaces Seanad by-elections for the six seats with a list system mirroring the process used in European Parliament elections and increases the number of nominations a prospective candidate needs from 10 to 60 registered electors or the payment of a deposit of €1,800. As of 21 March 2025, the entire 2024 Act was in force, with the exception of sections 27 and 31-46 that will take effect upon the next dissolution of Dáil Éireann. On 1 April 2025, the first register of Higher Educations Electors was published, with 62,775 registered electors.

=== Gender composition ===
At the 2025 Seanad election, 27 of the 60 Senators elected or appointed to the 27th Seanad were women. This represents 45% of members of the Seanad. This compares with 25.5% of women who made up the membership of the 34th Dáil following the 2024 general election. This 45% represents the highest number of women senators in Irish history.

The Seanad has, historically, had a slightly higher representation of women members than the directly elected Dáil. As of March 2026, 139 of the 830 individuals who have served as senators since 1922 have been women (16.7% of senators). By contrast, as of March 2026, 151 of the 1,032 TDs elected to serve in the Dáil since its foundation in 1919 have been women (14.63% of all TDs).

Tras Honan was the first woman elected as chairperson of either House. She was elected Cathaoirleach of the 16th Seanad in May 1982, later serving as Leas-Chathaoirleach from 1983 to 1987 in the 17th Seanad and as Cathaoirleach again from 1987 to 1989 in the 18th Seanad. When her sister Carrie Acheson was elected to the 22nd Dáil at the 1981 general election, they became the first sisters to serve in the Oireachtas at the same time.

The Seanad was the first of the two Houses to elect a deputy chairperson, with Evelyn Owens serving as Leas-Chathaoirleach of the 13th Seanad from 1973 to 1977.

== Referendum on abolition ==
In October 2009, Fine Gael leader Enda Kenny stated his intention that a Fine Gael government would abolish the Seanad, and along with reducing the number of TDs by 20, it would "save an estimated €150m over the term of a Dáil". During the 2011 election campaign, Labour, Sinn Féin and the Socialist Party also supported abolition of the Seanad, while Fianna Fáil supported a referendum on the issue. The programme of the Fine Gael–Labour coalition, which came to power at the election, sought to abolish the Seanad as part of a broader programme of constitutional reform, but lost a referendum on the matter in October 2013 by 51.7% to 48.3%.

== Members from Northern Ireland ==
Taoisigh have often included people from Northern Ireland among their eleven nominees, such as John Robb (served 1982–1989), Seamus Mallon (1982–1983) of the SDLP, Bríd Rodgers (1983–1987) also of the SDLP, peace campaigner Gordon Wilson (1993–1997), businessman Edward Haughey (1994–2002), and Maurice Hayes (1997–2002).

Sam McAughtry was elected to the Industrial and Commercial Panel in a by-election in February 1996. Niall Ó Donnghaile was elected in April 2016 as a Sinn Féin senator for the Administrative Panel while serving on Belfast City Council. Ian Marshall, a farmer and activist from a Unionist background, was elected to the Agricultural Panel in a by-election in April 2018. Mal O'Hara of Belfast, leader of Green Party Northern Ireland, was deemed elected on the Administrative Panel in 2024. In the 2025 election, Sinn Féin MLA for Newry and Armagh and Minister for the Economy, Conor Murphy was elected to the Seanad alongside the Social Democrats' Patricia Stephenson, who is originally from Belfast.

== Notable former senators ==
- Noël Browne
- Robert Malachy Burke
- Éamon de Buitléar
- James Dooge
- Garret FitzGerald
- Brian Friel
- Valerie Goulding
- Edward Haughey
- Maurice Hayes
- Michael D. Higgins
- Tras Honan
- Douglas Hyde
- Benjamin Guinness
- Cecil Lavery
- Edward Pakenham
- Sam McAughtry
- Peadar Toner Mac Fhionnlaoich
- Catherine McGuinness
- John Magnier
- Seamus Mallon
- P. J. Mara
- Maurice George Moore
- Conor Cruise O'Brien
- Mary Robinson
- Bríd Rodgers
- James Ryan
- Owen Sheehy-Skeffington
- T. K. Whitaker
- Gordon Wilson
- David Norris

== See also ==
- Bicameralism
- Politics of the Republic of Ireland
- Records of members of the Oireachtas
- Senate of Northern Ireland
- Senedd (Wales)
- List of female members of Seanad Éireann
- List of addresses to Seanad Éireann
