= 1979 Irish constitutional referendums =

Two referendums were held together in Ireland on 5 July 1979, each on a proposed amendment of the Irish constitution. Both proposals were approved by voters.

== Sixth Amendment ==
The Sixth Amendment to the constitution provided that orders made by the Adoption Board could not be declared unconstitutional because they were not made by a court.

Sixth Amendment of the Constitution of Ireland referendum
Choice	Votes	%
For	601,694	98.97
Against	6,265	1.03
Total	607,959	100.00
Valid votes	607,959	97.51
Invalid/blank votes	15,517	2.49
Total votes	623,476	100.00
Registered voters/turnout	2,179,466	28.61

== Seventh Amendment ==
The Seventh Amendment to the constitution allowed the state to determine by law which institutions of higher education would be entitled to elect members of the Senate.

Seventh Amendment of the Constitution of Ireland referendum
Choice	Votes	%
For	552,600	92.40
Against	45,484	7.60
Total	598,084	100.00
Valid votes	598,084	96.06
Invalid/blank votes	24,562	3.94
Total votes	622,646	100.00
Registered voters/turnout	2,179,466	28.57

== See also ==
- Constitutional amendment
- Politics of the Republic of Ireland
- History of the Republic of Ireland
- Amendments to the Constitution of Ireland
