= Enterprise Ireland =

Irish state economic development agency

Coordinates: 52°42′33.66″N 8°53′37.80″W

State agency of the Department of Enterprise, Tourism and Employment overview
- Formed: 1998
- Jurisdiction: Ireland
- Headquarters: East Point Business Park, The Plaza, Dublin 3, D03 E5R6
- State agency of the Department of Enterprise, Tourism and Employment executives: Jennifer Melia, CEO; Jim Woulfe, Chairman
- Key document: Industrial Development (Enterprise Ireland) Act, 1998
- Website: Enterprise Ireland website

Enterprise Ireland is an Irish state economic development agency focused on helping Irish-owned business deliver new export sales. The aim of Enterprise Ireland is to help Irish enterprises to "start, grow, innovate and win export sales in global markets."

== History ==
Enterprise Ireland was established by the Industrial Development (Enterprise Ireland) Act 1998, superseding two earlier bodies: Forbairt and An Bord Tráchtála. Forbairt was established in 1993 as part of Forfás, to make industrial development grants, while An Bord Tráchtála was established in 1991 through the merger of the Irish Goods Council and Córas Tráchtala — a statutory body founded in 1959 to market Irish goods abroad — and successor of Córas Tráchtála Teoranta, founded in 1951. The Irish Goods Council was founded to market Irish goods in Ireland in 1974, originally within the National Development Association as the Working Group on the Promotion and Sale of Irish Goods; in 1978 it was spun out and merged with Vivian Murray's private National Development Council as a limited company.

== Local Enterprise Offices ==
Enterprise Ireland operates 31 local enterprise offices at city and county level to support local entrepreneurs. Internationally, Enterprise Ireland operates 40 in-market offices across the world to support the growth of Irish exports.

== See also ==
- County and City Enterprise Board
