= Institute of Technology, Tralee =

Former RTC

Coordinates: 52.2713°N 9.6892°W

- Institiúid Teicneolaíochta Thrá Lí
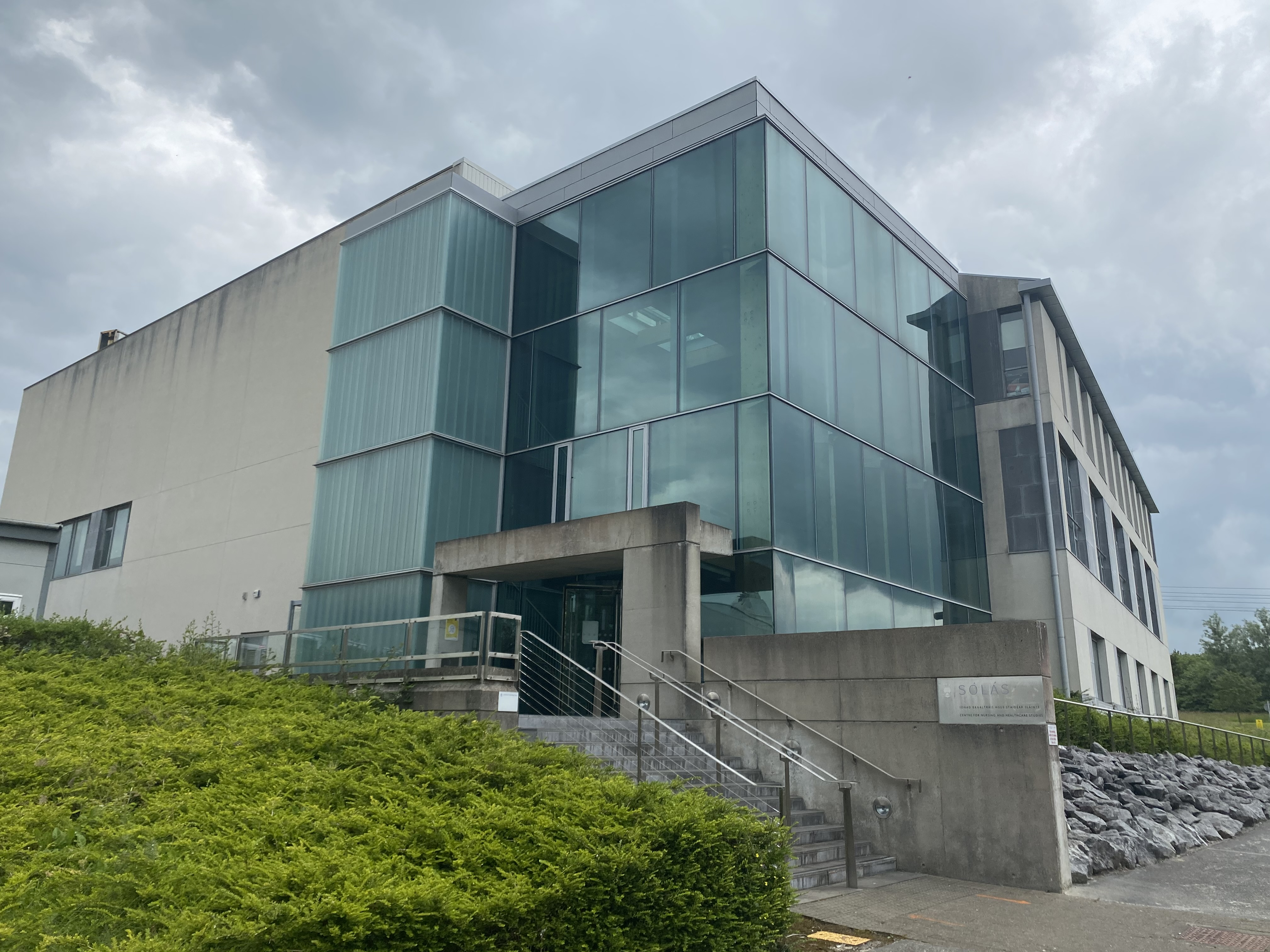
- Tralee campus in June 2021
- Type: Public
- Active: 1977–1 January 2021
- President: Oliver Murphy
- Students: 3,500+
- Location: Dromtacker, Tralee, Munster, Ireland
- Website: www.ittralee.ie

The Institute of Technology, Tralee (IT Tralee; Irish: Institiúid Teicneolaíochta Thrá Lí) was an institute of technology, located in Tralee, Ireland. It was established in 1977 as the Regional Technical College, Tralee. In January 2021, itself and the Cork Institute of Technology were dissolved to become the Munster Technological University, Ireland's second technological university.

== History ==
Tralee RTC was established in 1977 under the control of the Town of Tralee Vocational Education Committee (VEC). Dr. Seán McBride was appointed Principal in 1978. In 1984, work began on the South Campus.

Sligo band Those Nervous Animals performed at the Horan Centre in Tralee as part of the R.T.C. (Regional Technical College) rag week concerts in 1985.

In 1992, Tralee RTC became an autonomous institution under the Regional Technical Colleges Act (1992). In 1997, Tralee RTC was renamed, along with the other RTCs, as the Institute of Technology, Tralee. In 2007, the title of the head of the institute changed from "Director" to "President." Michael Carmody served as president until 2011. Dr. Oliver Murphy served as acting president until appointed to the post for a five-year term. Despite resigning, Dr. Murphy was reappointed to a second five-year term in 2017, and prior to the merger with MTU, retired in 2020.

== Schools and departments ==
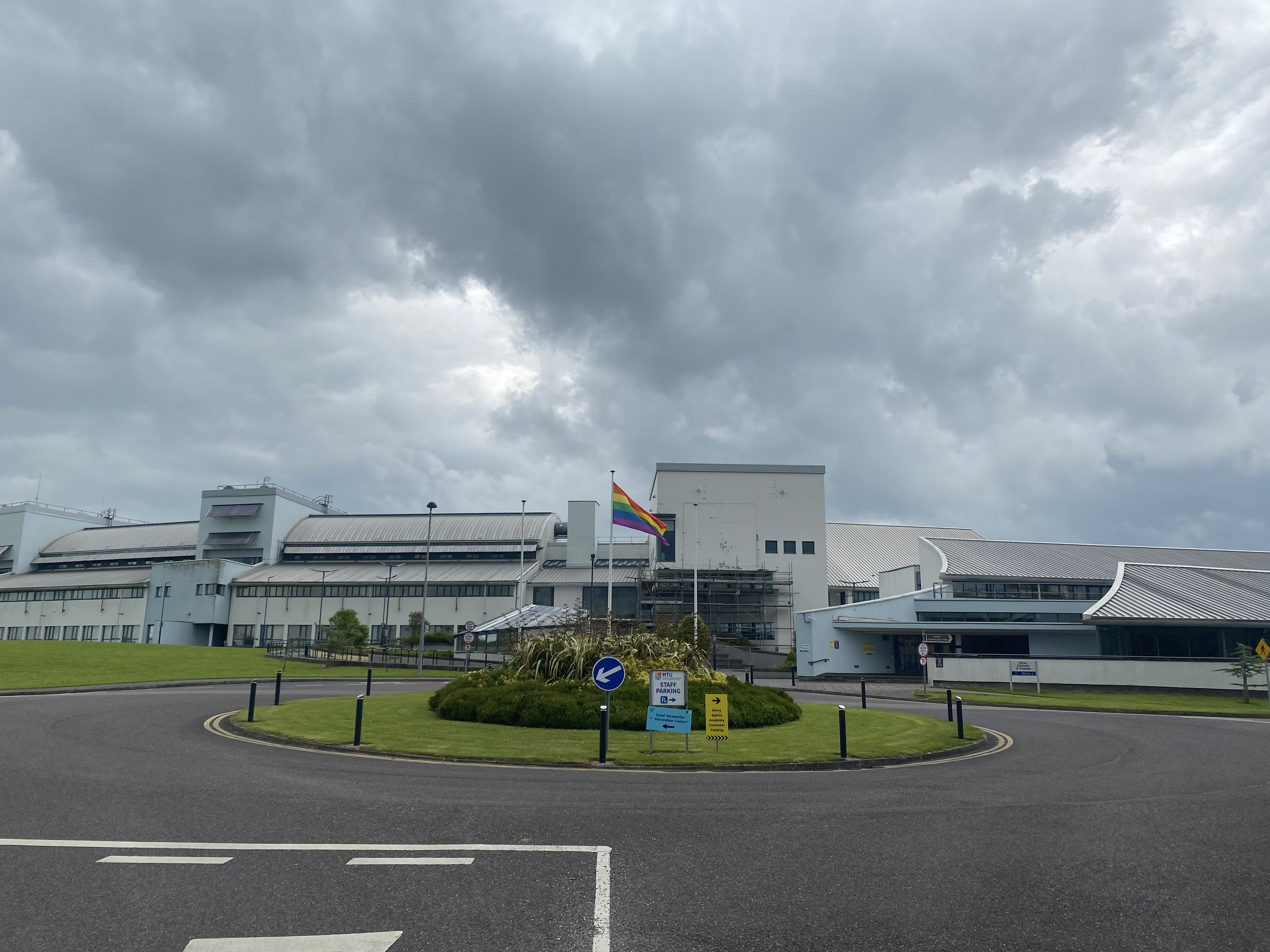
Institute of Technology, Tralee campus

The institute had two campuses - the North campus (located in Dromtacker) and the South campus (located in Clash) - approximately 2.4 km (1.5 mi) apart. As of October 2019, it has the following Schools and Departments:

- School of Business, Computing and Humanities located on the North campus:
  - Creative Media and Information Technology Department
  - Business Studies Department
  - Hotel, Culinary Arts and Tourism Department
  - Computing Department
- School of Science, Technology, Engineering and Mathematics located on the South campus:
  - Technology, Engineering and Mathematics Department
  - Civil Engineering and Construction Studies Department
  - Agriculture and Manufacturing Studies Department
  - Biological and Pharmaceutical Science Department
  - Apprentice Section
- School of Health and Social Sciences:
  - Health and Leisure Studies Department located on the North campus
  - Social Sciences Department located in the North Campus
  - Nursing and Health Care Sciences Department located in the North campus

The South campus has been in operation since the opening of the Institute in 1977. The North campus opened in 2001. The continuing development of the North campus will eventually lead to the entire institute being relocated to Dromtacker.

== Merger to become Munster Technological University ==
Taoiseach Leo Varadkar announced the formal approval of Munster Technological University in May 2020, to begin operations in January 2021.

Munster TU is among a group of other possible Technological Universities to add to TU Dublin.

== Industry links ==
The Tom Crean Business Incubation Centre opened in the north campus in January 2005. Situated on the same site in Dromtacker is the Kerry Technology Park, owned and operated by Shannon Development. The Park and the Institute often work closely together, developing curricula and providing an exchange of students to work in the Park. In September 2004, a new nursing complex opened on the North campus. The "Solás building", as it is known, is where student nurses learn practical nursing skills.

The Shannon Applied Biotechnology Centre (SABC) is also based on the campus of IT Tralee and is a joint venture between IT Tralee and Limerick Institute of Technology.

== Sports ==
In 1997, IT Tralee GAA became the first RTC team to win the Sigerson Cup. It was only Tralee's second outing in this competition. However, the college created further history by winning the Sigerson three times in successive seasons to become the only RTC/Institute of Technology to do so in the competition's history.

The men's team won the Trench Cup (the second tier Gaelic football championship trophy for Third Level Education Colleges, Institutes of Technology and Universities in Ireland and England) in 2010.

The Ladies football team won the O'Connor Cup back-to-back in 1998 and 1999. The hurlers also won the Ryan Cup in 1997 with the camogie team winning the Purcell Shield in the same year.

== See also ==
- Education in the Republic of Ireland
- Third-level education in the Republic of Ireland
