= LIT Tipperary =

Technological University of the Shannon: Thurles Campus
- Motto: To promote sustainable rural social & economic development in the region served by the Institute
- Established: 1998; 27 years ago
- Address: Nenagh Road, Thurles and Clonmel, County Tipperary, Ireland
- Campus: Thurles; Clonmel
- Affiliations: HETAC; Setanta College
- Website: lit.ie/campuses/thurles

The Technological University of the Shannon: Thurles Campus (TUS Thurles; established as the Tipperary Institute and later as LIT Tipperary Irish: ITL Thiobráid Arann) is a constituent institute of the Technological University of the Shannon, located in Thurles and Clonmel, Ireland.

The campus is also a development agency and research centre in County Tipperary, Ireland and was originally one of the five constituent schools of Limerick Institute of Technology (LIT). The Tipperary Institute was founded by the Irish Government in 1998 and opened two campuses in Thurles and Clonmel in September 1999. The then Taoiseach Bertie Ahern officially inaugurated the institute on 7 April 2000. It was formally integrated into LIT on 1 September 2011. In 2021, LIT Tipperary became part of the Technological University of the Shannon: Midlands Midwest.

== Name ==
The college was originally known as the Tipperary Rural and Business Development Institute (TRBDI). It used Tipperary Institute as its trading name. In 2011, its name was changed to LIT Tipperary following its merger with LIT.

== Courses ==
The college has two academic departments: Business, Education and Social Science and Technology, Media and Science. It is fully HETAC-accredited and offers National Framework of Qualifications Level 7 and Level 8 full-time degree courses, as well as a number of part-time and evening courses.

The college also facilitates the joint-run BSc (Hons) in Strength & Conditioning (level 8) in conjunction with online sports college Setanta College.

== LIT Merger ==
In 2010, the Irish government introduced rationalization measures to cut costs of third level bodies, and commenced a merger between Tipperary Institute and Limerick Institute of Technology. The resulting integration of Tipperary Institute into LIT saw the two campuses becoming LIT Tipperary.
