= 2000 National Camogie League =

Camogie tournament

National Camogie League 2000
Winners
- Champions: Cork (10th title)
- Captain: Vivienne Harris

Runners-up
- Runners-up: Tipperary

The 2000 National Camogie League is a competition in the women's’ team field sport of camogie was won by Cork, who defeated Tipperary in the final, played at O'Connor Park, Tullamore.

== Arrangements ==
Tipperary easily defeated Armagh and Derry and overcame an inexperienced Kilkenny team before they defeated Galway after extra time in a closely fought semi-final. Cork defeated Armagh, Galway (twice), Kilkenny and Tipperary en route to the final.

== The Final ==
The pattern of the final was set once Fiona O'Driscoll placed the ball past Jovita Delaney in the Tipp goal in the first minute of the second half. Playing with a strong wind, Tipperary confined Cork to one point from a free in the first half while sending over seven of their own. Cork had equalized by the 53rd minute and pulled away with a goal from Ciara Walsh, who had scored 1-6 against Kildare in the junior final which had preceded the senior final. Shortly afterwards Fiona O'Driscoll’s lobbed shot went all the way to the Tipp net.

== Division 2 ==
The Junior National League, known since 2006 as Division Two, was won by Cork intermediates who defeated Laois in the final.

=== Final stages ===
May 20
Final

Cork	3-7 – 1-10	Tipperary

O'Connor Park, Tullamore

Cork	Tipperary

Cork:
GK	1	Cora Keohane (Barryroe)
RCB	2	Denise Cronin (Glen Rovers) (0-1)
FB	3	Eithne Duggan (Bishopstown)
LCB	4	Mags Finn (Fr O'Neill’s)
RWB	5	Mary Burke
CB	6	Mary O'Connor (Killeagh)
LWB	7	Ursula Troy (Newtownshandrum)
MF	8	Vivienne Harris (Bishopstown) (Capt)
MF	9	Sarra Hayes (Rockbán)
RWF	10	Paula O'Connor (Newtownshandrum)
CF	11	Coaimhe Harrington (Newtownshandrum)
LWF	12	Linda Mellerick (Glen Rovers)
RCF	13	Sinéad O'Callaghan (Ballinhassig)
FF	14	Fiona O'Driscoll (Fr O'Neill’s) 2-7 (1-5 frees, 1 45)
LCF	15	Elaine Burke (Valley Rovers)
Substitutes:
FF		Ciara Healy 1-0 for Burke (substituted in) 49'

Tipperary:
GK	1	Jovita Delaney (Cashel) (Capt)
RCB	2	Naimh Harkin
FB	3	Una O'Dwyer (Cashel)
LCB	4	Claire Madden (Nenagh Éire Óg)
RWB	5	Meadhbh Stokes
CB	6	Ciara Gaynor (Burgess)
LWB	7	Sinéad Nealon (Burgess)
MF	8	Emily Hayden (Cashel)
MF	9	Angela McDermott (Kildangan)
RWF	10	Noelle Kennedy (Toomevara) 0-4
CF	11	Therese Brophy (Burgess)
LWF	12	Caitríona Hennessy (Cashel) 0-4 (0-1 free)
RCF	13	Eimear McDonnell (Burgess) 0-1
FF	14	Deirdre Hughes (Toomevara) 1-0
LCF	15	Philly Fogarty (Cashel) 0-1
Substitutes:
MF		Suzanne Kelly for Harkin (substituted in) 30'
FF		Sheena Howard for Harrington (substituted in) 49'

Preceded by National Camogie League 1999	National Camogie League; 1977 – present	Succeeded by National Camogie League 2001
