= 2002 All-Ireland Senior Camogie Championship =

Camogie championship

All-Ireland Senior Camogie Championship 2002
Championship details
- Dates: 3 June — 21 September 2002
- Teams: 6

All-Ireland champions
- Winners: Cork (20th win)
- Captain: Una O'Donoghue
- Manager: Pa Finn

All-Ireland runners-up
- Runners-up: Tipperary
- Manager: Michael Cleary

Championship statistics
- Matches played: 18

The 2002 All-Ireland Senior Camogie Championship—known as the Foras na Gaeilge All-Ireland Senior Camogie Championship for sponsorship reasons—was the high point of the 2002 season. The championship was won by Cork who scored four goals in defeating Tipperary by a nine-point margin in the final. The attendance was 13,287, third highest in the history of the sport of camogie at that time. This and the subsequent final between the two counties was a high point in a period of rapid growth in the popularity of the sport of camogie which quadrupled the average attendance at its finals in a ten-year period.

== Semi-finals ==
Cork goalkeeper Ger Casey did not have a single shot to save in the first of two one sided semi-finals in Limerick. The turning point came after 26 minutes when the sides were level at 0-3 each. Fiona O'Driscoll found Emer Dillon to knock in Cork's opening goal and O'Driscoll stung Galway with another goal just before half time. With ten minutes gone in the second semi-final, Kilkenny goalkeeper Miriam Holland brought off a fine save only for Tipperary full-forward Deirdre Hughes to score from the rebound.

== Final ==
Three goals in the final from Fiona O'Driscoll prevented Tipperary completing four in-a-row and brought her personal championship total to 9-12, a record for the 15-a-side game.

Tipperary started the second half looking the more likely winners when two fine points from Philly Fogarty and Claire Grogan gave them a three-point lead. Cork responded with points from Emer Dillon and O'Leary, a goal from Una O'Donoghue after an Emer Dillon centre, a goal from Fiona O'Driscoll soloing and hand-passing to the net after some outstanding defensive work at the other end, another from Fiona O'Driscoll and third from a dropping ball when Fiona O'Driscoll used her strength to grab the ball and shoot under great pressure. Jovita Delaney almost made the save, but the ball broke behind, trickled over the line.

Diarmuid O'Flynn wrote in the Irish Examiner:

"Good game, despite the lop-sided look at the end which didn't do justice to Tipperary, but the real pity was that so few were there to witness such a compelling team and individual performance. Nobody figured that Tipperary's tyros, bursting at the seams with hurling skills and with a ferocious appetite, would finally put the Premier county on the camogie map. For the last three years, Cork's players were like the rest of the camogie world, mere witnesses to greatness, as Tipperary first broke their duck at this level, then went on to triple success. Yesterday, at Croke Park, that dam finally burst. Three minutes into that second half, Tipp led by 1-8 to 1-6; fifteen minutes later, it was 4-7 to 1-8. Floodgates open, 3-4 without reply, game over.

== Aftermath ==
When Tipperary regained the title in 2003 Una O'Dwyer was to claim that the concession of four goals had haunted her colleagues.

"It all came down to last year and those four goals. Everyone kept saying 'four goals, four goals', that was always in our mind."

=== Final stages ===
August 21
Semi-Final

Cork	4-12 – 0-5	Galway

Gaelic Grounds, Limerick

August 21
Semi-Final

Tipperary	1-11 – 0-6	Kilkenny

Gaelic Grounds, Limerick

September 15
Final

Cork	4-9 – 1-9	Tipperary

Croke Park, Dublin

Cork	Tipperary

CORK:
GK	1	Ger Casey (Inniscarra)
RCB	2	Joanne Callaghan (Cloughduv)
FB	3	Eithne Duggan (Bishopstown)
LCB	4	Stephanie Delea (Cloughduv)
RWB	5	Paula O'Connor (Newtownshandrum)
CB	6	Mary O'Connor (Killeagh)
LWB	7	Gemma O'Connor (St Finbarr's)
MF	8	Vivienne Harris (Bishopstown)
MF	9	Elaine Burke (Valley Rovers) (substituted off) 30'
RWF	10	Linda Mellerick (Glen Rovers)
CF	11	Emer Dillon (Ballygarvan) (0-3)
LWF	12	Jennifer O'Leary (Barryroe) (0-3)
RCF	13	Una O'Donoghue (Cloughduv) (1-1)
FF	14	Caoimhe Harrington (Newtownshandrum) (substituted off) 49'
LCF	15	Fiona O'Driscoll (Fr O'Neill’s) (3-2)
Substitutes:
MF		Rachel Maloney (Courcey Rovers) for Burke (substituted on) 30'
FF		Orla O'Sullivan (St Finbarr's) for Harrington (substituted on) 49'

TIPPERARY:
GK	1	Jovita Delaney (Cashel)
RCB	2	Paula Bulfin (Cashel)
FB	3	Una O'Dwyer (Cashel)
LCB	4	Claire Madden (Portroe)
RWB	5	Sinéad Nealon (Burgess) (substituted off) 43'
CB	6	Ciara Gaynor (Burgess) (0-1)
LWB	7	Therese Brophy (Burgess)
MF	8	Suzanne Kelly (Toomevara)
MF	9	Angie McDermott (Kildangan) (substituted off) 60'
RWF	10	Deirdre Hughes (Toomevara) (0-1)
CF	11	Emily Hayden (Cashel)
LWF	12	Noelle Kennedy (Toomevara)
RCF	13	Eimear McDonnell (Burgess) (1-1)
FF	14	Philly Fogarty (Cashel) (0-2)
LCF	15	Claire Grogan (Cashel) (0-4)
Substitutes:
RWB		Louise Young (Cashel) for Nealon (substituted on) 43'
MF		Emily Hayden (Cashel) for McDermott (substituted on) 60'

Preceded by All-Ireland Senior Camogie Championship 2001	All-Ireland Senior Camogie Championship; 1932 – present	Succeeded by All-Ireland Senior Camogie Championship 2003
