= 1999 National Camogie League =

Camogie tournament

National Camogie League 1999
Winners
- Champions: Cork (9th title)
- Captain: Vivienne Harris

Runners-up
- Runners-up: Tipperary

The 1999 National Camogie League a competition in the women's team field sport of camogie was won for the fifth time succession by Cork, who defeated Tipperary by an astonishing 36 points in the final, played at Thurles. The one-sided result was, surprisingly, reversed by Tipperary in the championship when they beat Kilkenny in the 1999 All-Ireland championship final replay four months later, Kilkenny having beaten Cork in a replayed semi-final. It was the first National League to be played since the rules of camogie changed the team size to 15-a-side, although the 1993 and 1994 League had been played on an experimental basis with 15 players a side.

== Arrangements ==
Cork defeated Tipperary by five points in the first round of the league. Tipperary then defeated Limerick, Clare, Kilkenny and Wexford and scored a tremendous win over Galway in the semi-final.

== The Final ==
The final was played as a curtain raiser to the Tipperary v Kerry Munster hurling championship tie in Thurles and Cork ran up 2-10 without reply in the opening 20 minutes. By half time it was 5–13 to 0–3. When Dierdre Hughes pointed forty seconds after the start of the second half Cork replied with two goals within a minute. Gerry Slevin wrote in The Guardian:

"The idea was good, playing a major camogie fixture before a hurling match, now the ladies have upped their complement of players to fifteen a side, using a full pitch. Not so good was that the hurling public did not bother to go along to Semple Stadium for a 5pm throw-in. But as the crowd began to gather in the second half, they looked up at the scoreboard that was nigh incredible to comprehend and which showed Tipp in a light no one could have anticipated. It was sheer annihilation. After only ten minutes of the hour, the result was inevitable. No matter how one looks at it, this was a very serious blow to Tipp’s camogie prospects, and yet it would be wrong to view the performance in any light other than the fact that it was one of those days when nothing went right."

== Division 2 ==
The Junior National League, known since 2006 as Division Two, was won by Derry who defeated Wexford intermediates in the final.

=== Final stages ===
May 22
Final

Cork	9-19 – 2-4	Tipperary
Una O'Donoghue 3-1, Sinéad O'Callaghan, Fiona O'Driscoll 2-4 each; Linda Mellerick 2-0, Lyn Delea 0-7, Mary O'Connor 0-2, Sarrah Hayes 0-1		Noelle Kennedy 1-3, Angie McDermott 1-0, Deirdre Hughes 0-2, Emily Hayden 0-1, Caitríona Hennessy 0-1.

Thurles

Cork	Tipperary

Cork:
GK	1	Cora Keohane (Barryroe)
RCB	2	Stephanie Delea (Glen Rovers)
FB	3	Eithne Duggan (Bishopstown)
LCB	4	Mag Finn (Fr O'Neill's)
RWB	5	Paula O'Connor (Newtownshandrum) 0–1
CB	6	Denise Cronin (Glen Rovers)
LWB	7	Vivienne Harris (Bishopstown) (Capt)
MF	8	Linda Mellerick (Glen Rovers) 2–0
MF	9	Ursula Troy (Newtownshandrum)
RWF	10	Mary O'Connor (Killeagh) 0–2
CF	11	Sinéad O'Callaghan (Ballinhassig) 2–3
LWF	12	Una O'Donoghue (Cloughduv) 3–1
RCF	13	Sarra Hayes (Rockbán) 0–1
FF	14	Lyn Delea (Glen Rovers) 0-7 (1 45, 2 frees)
LCF	15	Fiona O'Driscoll (Fr O'Neill's) 2–4

Tipperary:
GK	1	Nora Dwan (Toomevara)
RCB	2	Marie Harkin (Drom & Inch)
FB	3	Una O'Dwyer (Cashel)
LCB	4	Ciara Gaynor (Kilruane)
RWB	5	Therese Brophy (Burgess)
CB	6	Suzanne Kelly (Toomevara)
LWB	7	Sinéad Nealon (Burgess)
MF	8	Méadhbh Stokes (Cashel)
MF	9	Emily Hayden (Cashel) 0–1
RWF	10	Eimear McDonnell (Burgess) 0–1
CF	11	Noelle Kennedy (Toomevara) 1-3 (frees)
LWF	12	Angie McDermott (Knockavilla)
RCF	13	Caitríona Hennessy (Drom & Inch)
FF	14	Deirdre Hughes (Toomevara) 0–2
LCF	15	Niamh Harkin (Drom & Inch)
Substitutes:
GK		Louise Ryan (Holycross) for Dwan (substituted on) 19'
FF		Philly Fogarty (Cashel) for Marie Harkin (substituted on) 25'
FF		Claire Madden for Gaynor (substituted on) 49'

Preceded by National Camogie League 1998	National Camogie League; 1977 – present	Succeeded by National Camogie League 2000
