= 2003 All-Ireland Senior Camogie Championship =

Camogie championship

All-Ireland Senior Camogie Championship 2003
Championship details
- Dates: 3 June — 21 September 2003
- Teams: 6

All-Ireland champions
- Winners: Tipperary (4th win)
- Captain: Una O'Dwyer
- Manager: Raymie Ryan

All-Ireland runners-up
- Runners-up: Cork
- Manager: John Considine

Championship statistics
- Matches played: 18

The 2003 All-Ireland Senior Camogie Championship—known as the Foras na Gaeilge All-Ireland Senior Camogie Championship for sponsorship reasons—was the high point of the 2003 season. The championship was won by Tipperary who defeated Cork by a three-point margin in the final. The attendance was a then record of 16,183. Player of the Match was Eimear McDonnell, a niece of Cork football legend Billy Morgan. The championship and the final was a high point in a period of rapid growth in the popularity of the sport of camogie which quadrupled the average attendance at its finals in a ten-year period.

== Semi-finals ==
In the semi-final Cork were 2-2 up after only seven minutes, with the goals coming from Fiona O'Driscoll and Orla O'Sullivan. “All Galway could do was look on” one reporter wrote as they trailed 0-0 to Cork's 3-6 at the break and lost by 25 points. Tipperary beat Limerick 18 points in the other semi-final. With six minutes of the half remaining, Tipperary were awarded a penalty which centre back Ciara Gaynor struck to the back of the net and it gave them a 2-8 to 0-7 half-time lead.

== Final ==
Cork led 0-3 to 1-3 at half-time. Deirdre Hughes got an early second-half goal and Eimear McDonnell scored four points to put them into a six-point lead with 10 minutes remaining before a late Gemma O'Connor goal put a better appearance on the scoreboard. Goalkeeper Jovita Delaney made a vital block and clearance on a late free.

=== Final stages ===
August 23
Semi-Final

Cork	4-16 – 0-3	Galway

Cusack Park, Ennis

August 23
Semi-Final

Tipperary	4-16 – 0-10	Limerick

Cusack Park, Ennis

September 21
Final

Tipperary	2-11 – 1-11	Cork

Croke Park, Dublin

Tipperary	Cork

TIPPERARY:
GK	1	Jovita Delaney (Cashel)
RCB	2	Suzanne Kelly (Toomevara)
FB	3	Una O'Dwyer (Cashel) (Capt)
LCB	4	Claire Madden (Fr. O'Neills)
RWB	5	Sinéad Nealon (Burgess)
CB	6	Ciara Gaynor (Burgess)
LWB	7	Therese Brophy (Burgess)
MF	8	Angie McDermott (Cappawhite)
MF	9	Philly Fogarty (Cashel)
RWF	10	Joanne Ryan (Drom-Inch) (0-1)
CF	11	Emily Hayden (Cashel) (0-2)
LWF	12	Claire Grogan (Cashel) (0-1)
RCF	13	Noelle Kennedy (Toomevara) (0-2) (substituted off) 56'
FF	14	Deirdre Hughes (Toomevara) (1-1)
LCF	15	Eimear McDonnell (Burgess) (1-4)
Substitutes:
RCF		Trish O'Halloran (Portroe) for Fogarty (substituted on) 55'

CORK:
GK	1	Ger Casey (Inniscarra)
RCB	2	Joanne Callaghan (Cloughduv)
FB	3	Eithne Duggan (Bishopstown)
LCB	4	Stephanie Delea (Cloughduv) (Capt)
RWB	5	Paula O'Connor (Newtownshandrum) (substituted off) Half time'
CB	6	Mary O'Connor (Killeagh) (0-2)
LWB	7	Gemma O'Connor (St Finbarr's) (1-0) (substituted off) 36' (substituted on) 54'
MF	8	Rachel Maloney (Courcey Rovers)
MF	9	Vivienne Harris (Bishopstown) (substituted off) 47'
RWF	10	Una O'Donoghue (Cloughduv) (0-1)
CF	11	Emer Dillon (Ballygarvan) (0-2)
LWF	12	Jennifer O'Leary (Barryroe) (0-2)
RCF	13	Orla O'Sullivan (St Finbarr's) (0-1) (substituted off) 54'
FF	14	Caoimhe Harrington (Newtownshandrum) (substituted off) 47'
LCF	15	Fiona O'Driscoll (Fr O’Neill’s) (0-3)
Substitutes:
RWB		Cathriona Foley (Rockbán) for Paula O'Connor (substituted on) Half time'
MF		Briege Corkery (Cloughduv) for Harris (substituted on) 47'
LWB		Sarah Hayes (Rockbán) for Gemma O'Connor (substituted on) 36'
FF		Colette Desmond (Newcestown) for Harrington (substituted on) 47'
FF		Gemma O'Connor (St Finbarr's) for O'Sullivan (returning to play) (substituted on) 54'

Preceded by All-Ireland Senior Camogie Championship 2002	All-Ireland Senior Camogie Championship; 1932 – present	Succeeded by All-Ireland Senior Camogie Championship 2004
