= 2001 All-Ireland Senior Camogie Championship =

Camogie championship

All-Ireland Senior Camogie Championship 2001
Championship details
- Dates: 3 June — 21 September 2001
- Teams: 6

All-Ireland champions
- Winners: Tipperary (3rd win)
- Captain: Emily Hayden
- Manager: Michael Cleary

All-Ireland runners-up
- Runners-up: Kilkenny
- Captain: Mairéad Costello
- Manager: Brendan Williams and Ted Browne

Championship statistics
- Matches played: 18

The 2001 All-Ireland Senior Camogie Championship—known as the Foras na Gaeilge All-Ireland Senior Camogie Championship for sponsorship reasons—was the high point of the 2001 season. The championship was won by Tipperary who scored defeated their great rivals of the age Cork in a replayed semi-final and Kilkenny by a 16-point margin in the final. The attendance was a then record of 16,354.

== Semi-finals ==
Tipperary needed an injury time equaliser to draw with Cork in the semi-finals at Mullingar. Injury time goals by Eimear McDonnell and Noelle Kennedy gave Cork a somewhat flattering seven-point victory in the replay. Martina Maher scored both goals for Kilkenny against Galway for Kilkenny who qualified for their second final in three years with a relatively inexperienced team, Edel Maher and Aoife Neary were just 16 and goalkeeper Caitríona Ryan only made her championship debut that summer, when star of the team Sinead Millea returned from her world travels. Kilkenny were jointly managed by Brendan Williams and Ted Browne (Angela Downey's husband),

== Final ==
Tipperary took control of the final in a three-minute spell from the ninth to the 12th minute of the first half when first Claire Grogan and then Deirdre Hughes smashed home goals before Hughes scored again with a point. Kilkenny never recovered from this seven point barrage.

== Supermom ==
Dubbed “supermom” in the media, Kilkenny substitute Jillian Dillon-Maher gave birth seven weeks old before she helped Kilkenny dispatch Galway in the All-Ireland semi-final. She then played in the All Ireland final two and a half months after giving birth.

=== Final stages ===
August 21
Semi-Final

Kilkenny	2-12 – 1-9	Galway

Gaelic Grounds, Limerick

August 21
Semi-Final

Tipperary	2-8 – 0-14	Cork

Mullingar

August 21
Semi-Final Replay

Tipperary	3-13 – 1-12	Cork

Mullingar

September 16
Final

Tipperary	4-13 – 1-6	Kilkenny

Croke Park, Dublin

Tipperary	Kilkenny

TIPPERARY:
GK	1	Jovita Delaney (Cashel)
RCB	2	Paula Bulfin (Cashel) (substituted off) 56'
FB	3	Una O'Dwyer (Cashel)
LCB	4	Claire Madden (Portroe)
RWB	5	Sinéad Nealon (Burgess)
CB	6	Ciara Gaynor (Burgess) (0-1)
LWB	7	Therese Brophy (Burgess)
MF	8	Suzanne Kelly (Toomevara)
MF	9	Philly Fogarty (Cashel) (0-1) (substituted off) 56'
RWF	10	Emily Hayden (Cashel) (Capt)
CF	11	Noelle Kennedy (Toomevara) (0-5)
LWF	12	Joanne Ryan (Drom-Inch)
RCF	13	Eimear McDonnell (Burgess) (1-2)
FF	14	Deirdre Hughes (Toomevara) (2-2)
LCF	15	Claire Grogan (Cashel) (1-2) (substituted off) 56'
Substitutes:
LCF		Gráinne Shanahan (Toomevara) for Grogan (substituted on) 56' 0-1
MF		Niamh Harkin (Cashel) for Fogarty (substituted on) 56'
RCB		Sheena Howard (Cashel) for Bulfin (substituted on) 56'

KILKENNY:
GK	1	Caitríona Ryan (Tullogher)
RCB	2	Marie Maher (St Anne’s)
FB	3	Sinéad Costelloe (St Lachtain's)
LCB	4	Mairéad Costelloe (St Lachtain's) (Capt)
RWB	5	Esther Kennedy (St Lachtain's)
CB	6	Kelly Long (St Lachtain's)
LWB	7	Edel Maher (St Anne’s) (substituted off) 56'
MF	8	Brigid Mullally (Glenmore) (0-1)
MF	9	Lizzie Lyng (Rower-Inistioge) (0-1)
RWF	10	Sinéad Millea (St Brigid’s Ballycallan) (1-2)
CF	11	Martina Maher (St Martin’s)
LWF	12	Imelda Kennedy (St Lachtain's) (0-1)
RCF	13	Catherine Doherty (St Anne’s)
FF	14	Aoife Neary (James Stephens)
LCF	15	Marina Downey (Lisdowney) (0-1)
Substitutes:
LCF		Jillian Dillon (St Lachtain's) for Edel Maher (substituted on) 23' 0-1

Preceded by All-Ireland Senior Camogie Championship 2000	All-Ireland Senior Camogie Championship; 1932 – present	Succeeded by All-Ireland Senior Camogie Championship 2002
