= 2000 All-Ireland Senior Camogie Championship =

Camogie championship

All-Ireland Senior Camogie Championship 2000
Championship details
- Dates: 3 June — 3 September 2000
- Teams: 8

All-Ireland champions
- Winners: Tipperary (2nd win)
- Captain: Jovita Delaney
- Manager: Michael Cleary

All-Ireland runners-up
- Runners-up: Cork
- Captain: Vivienne Harris

The 2000 All-Ireland Senior Camogie Championship—known as the Foras na Gaeilge (formerly Bórd na Gaeilge) All-Ireland Senior Camogie Championship for sponsorship reasons—was the high point of the 2000 season. The championship was won by Tipperary who achieved a second successive title beating Cork by a five-point margin in the final. The attendance was 12,880, second highest in the history of the sport of camogie at that time.

== Birth of a rivalry ==
This and subsequent finals between the two counties was a high point in a period of rapid growth in the popularity of the sport of camogie which quadrupled the average attendance at its finals in a ten-year period. “It was unquestionably a day on which the profile of the game soared and many players produced moments of individual brilliance.,” Pat Roche wrote in the Irish Times.

== Early rounds ==
Cork beat Kilkenny by 2-10 to 1-12 in the quarter-finals, Tipperary beat Clare 4-15 to 0-5, Galway beat Limerick 4-13 to 1-8 and Wexford beat Dublin 4-12 to 0-6. Cork easily defeated Wexford keeping them scoreless until just before the half-time whistle, in the semi-final. A goal by Noelle Kennedy proved to be the turning point of the second semi-final in which Tipperary beat Galway 2-11 to 1-8.

== Final ==
Unusually Tipperary were favourites for the final. By the 17th minute they led by 2-4 to 0-2. Deirdre Hughes was quickly on to a sideline cut by Emily Hayden before netting off a post for the opening goal after four minutes. Within two minutes she palmed the ball to the Cork net to finish off an astute centre from the 14-year-old Claire Grogan. Cork's goal in reply came too late from Una O'Donoghue.

=== Final stages ===
August 21
Semi-Final

Cork	3-13 – 1-5	Wexford

Parnell Park, Dublin

August 21
Semi-Final

Tipperary	2-11 – 1-8	Kilkenny

Parnell Park, Dublin

September 3
Final

Tipperary	2-11 – 1-9	Cork

Croke Park, Dublin

Tipperary	Cork

TIPPERARY:
GK	1	Jovita Delaney (Cashel) (Capt)
RCB	2	Suzanne Kelly (Toomevara)
FB	3	Una O'Dwyer (Cashel)
LCB	4	Claire Madden (Portroe)
RWB	5	Sinéad Nealon (Burgess)
CB	6	Ciara Gaynor (Burgess) (0-1)
LWB	7	Therese Brophy (Burgess)
MF	8	Emily Hayden (Cashel)
MF	9	Angela McDermott (Cappawhite)
RWF	10	Philly Fogarty (Cashel) (0-1)
CF	11	Noelle Kennedy (Toomevara)
LWF	12	Caitríona Hennessy (Cashel) (0-4)
RCF	13	Eimear McDonnell (Burgess) (0-2)
FF	14	Deirdre Hughes (Toomevara) (2-2)
LCF	15	Claire Grogan (Cashel) (0-2)

CORK:
GK	1	Cora Keohane (Barryroe)
RCB	2	Denise Cronin (Glen Rovers) (0-1)
FB	3	Eithne Duggan (Bishopstown)
LCB	4	Mags Finn (Fr O'Neill’s)
RWB	5	Sarah Hayes (Rockbán)
CB	6	Mary O'Connor (Killeagh)
LWB	7	Vivienne Harris (Bishopstown) (Capt)
MF	8	Ursula Troy (Newtownshandrum)
MF	9	Linda Mellerick (Glen Rovers)
RWF	10	Sinéad O'Callaghan (Ballinhassig) (0-2)
CF	11	Fiona O'Driscoll (Fr O'Neill’s) (0-4)
LWF	12	Caoimhe Harrington (Newtownshandrum) (substituted off) 49'
RCF	13	Elaine Burke (Valley Rovers) (0-1) (substituted off) 30'
FF	14	Ciara Healy (Bishopstown)
LCF	15	Una O'Donoghue (Cloughduv) (1-1)
Substitutes:
MF		Paula O'Connor (Newtownshandrum) for Burke (substituted in) 30'
FF		Mary Burke for Harrington (substituted in) 49'

Preceded by All-Ireland Senior Camogie Championship 1999	All-Ireland Senior Camogie Championship; 1932 – present	Succeeded by All-Ireland Senior Camogie Championship 2001
