= 2004 All-Ireland Senior Camogie Championship =

Camogie championship

All-Ireland Senior Camogie Championship 2004
Championship details
- Dates: 8 June — 19 September 2004
- Teams: 7

All-Ireland champions
- Winners: Tipperary (5th win)
- Captain: Joanne Ryan
- Manager: Raymie Ryan

All-Ireland runners-up
- Runners-up: Cork
- Manager: John Considine

Championship statistics
- Matches played: 18

The 2004 All-Ireland Senior Camogie Championship—known as the Foras na Gaeilge All-Ireland Senior Camogie Championship for sponsorship reasons—was the high point of the 2004 season, the centenary year for the sport of camogie. The championship was won by Tipperary who defeated Cork by an eight-point margin in the final. The attendance was a then record of 24,567.

== Group stages ==
Antrim staged their match with Kilkenny in Cushendall as part of the Glens Feis who were also celebrating their centenary in 2004. Cork had beaten Tipperary by 3-7 to 1-6 in the group stages of the National Camogie League.

== Semi-finals ==
As part of the centenary celebrations the two semi-finals were televised live by RTÉ for the first time. Cork beating Galway by 3-9 to 1-4 and Tipperary overcoming a strong Wexford challenge with a two-point win thanks to a goal from Deirdre Hughes. Because of illness team captain Joanne Ryan was not named in the starting line-up for the semi-final clash with Wexford but came off the bench.

== Final ==
A goal from Deirdre Hughes in the 19th minute, when she availed of a mix-up in the Cork defence to score into an empty net kept Tipperary on course for a fifth title in six years as Una O'Dwyer maintained her absolute control at the heart of their defence. Tipperary were denied a goal when Eimear McDonnell’s ninth minute penalty was stopped by Cork ’keeper Aoife Murray. Hughes’s goal was quickly followed by two pointed frees from Grogan, and gave Tipp an important psychological boost and a half time lead of 1-6 to 0-4 and when substitute Joanne Ryan scored a goal in the 43rd minute, Tipperary gained even more in confidence.

== Aftermath ==
Raymie Ryan retired as Tipperary manager the following November, having guided the Tipperary team to two successive All-Ireland victories, two Munster championship titles, and their first National League title since 1977.

=== Final stages ===
August 21
Semi-Final

Cork	3-9 – 1-4	Galway

Nowlan Park, Kilkenny

August 21
Semi-Final

Tipperary	1-10 – 2-5	Wexford

Nowlan Park, Kilkenny

September 19
Final

Tipperary	2-11 – 0-9	Cork

Croke Park, Dublin

Tipperary	Cork

TIPPERARY:
GK	1	Jovita Delaney (Cashel)
RCB	2	Suzanne Kelly (Toomevara)
FB	3	Una O'Dwyer (Cashel)
LCB	4	Julie Kirwan (Moneygall)
RWB	5	Sinéad Nealon (Burgess)
CB	6	Ciara Gaynor (Burgess)
LWB	7	Therese Brophy (Burgess)
MF	8	Angie McDermott (Kildangan)
MF	9	Philly Fogarty (Cashel) (substituted off) 55'
RWF	10	Joanne Ryan (Drom & Inch) (1-0)
CF	11	Noelle Kennedy (Toomevara)
LWF	12	Claire Grogan (Cashel) (0-9)
RCF	13	Eimear McDonnell (Burgess) (0-2)
FF	14	Deirdre Hughes (Toomevara) (1-0) (substituted off) 61'
LCF	15	Jill Horan (Clonoulty) (substituted off) 61'
Substitutes:
MF		Paula Bulfin (Cashel) for Fogarty (substituted on) 55'
FF		Emily Hayden (Cashel) for Hughes (substituted on) 61'
LCF		Geraldine Kinnane (Drom-Inch) for Horan (substituted on) 61'

CORK:
GK	1	Aoife Murray (Cloughduv)
RCB	2	Joanne Callaghan (Cloughduv)
FB	3	Stephanie Delea (Cloughduv)
LCB	4	Rosarie Holland (Barryroe) (substituted off) 36'
RWB	5	Paula O'Connor (Newtownshandrum)
CB	6	Mary O'Connor (Killeagh)
LWB	7	Rena Buckley (Inniscarra)
MF	8	Vivienne Harris (Bishopstown)
MF	9	Gemma O'Connor (St Finbarr's) (0-2)
RWF	10	Rachel Maloney (Courcey Rovers)
CF	11	Emer Dillon (Ballygarvan) (0-2)
LWF	12	Jennifer O'Leary (Barryroe) (0-4)
RCF	13	Una O'Donoghue (Cloughduv) (0-1)
FF	14	Emer Watson (Milford)
LCF	15	Colette Desmond (Newcestown) (substituted off) 41'
Substitutes:
LCB		Elaine Burke (Valley Rovers) for Holland (substituted on) 36'
FF		Anna Geary (Milford) for Desmond (substituted on) 41'

Preceded by All-Ireland Senior Camogie Championship 2003	All-Ireland Senior Camogie Championship; 1932 – present	Succeeded by All-Ireland Senior Camogie Championship 2005
