= Tipperary GAA honours =

Championships and individual awards

From 1887 onwards, Tipperary has been a stalwart in all aspects of the GAA. Winning many accolades over the years, they have won many first titles and, along with Cork and Galway, is the only county to have won Senior All-Irelands in Hurling, Men's football, Camogie, and Ladies' Football. Tipperary is the only county to win Senior Inter-county titles in Hurling, Football, Ladies' Football, Camogie, Hardball singles and doubles, Softball singles and doubles, 40x20 Senior singles and 40x20 Senior doubles. Tipperary is also the only county to win the Hurling Senior All-Ireland in every decade since the inception of the competition in 1887.

== Hurling ==
=== All-Ireland Senior Hurling Championships: 29 ===
- 1887, 1895, 1896, 1898, 1899, 1900, 1906, 1908, 1916, 1925, 1930, 1937, 1945, 1949, 1950, 1951, 1958, 1961, 1962, 1964, 1965, 1971, 1989, 1991, 2001, 2010, 2016, 2019, 2025

Year	Team	Score	Score	Opponent
1887	M. McNamara, M. Maher, T. Maher, T. Burke, G. Dwyer, N. Murphy, E. Bowe, J. Ryan, T. Healy, P. Leahy, T. Dwyer, P. Lambe, J. Leamy, J. Mockler, J. Stapleton, A. Maher, T. Stapleton, D. Ryan, J. Dunne, M. Carroll, T. Carroll	1-1-1	0-0-0	Galway
1895	P. Byrne, B. Kerwick, M. Maher, E. Maher, J. Maher, J. Walsh, P. Maher, D. Walsh, T. Flanagan, J. Flanagan, F. Moriarty, N. Brennan, W. Devane, J. Gleeson, P. Riordan, J. Connolly, J. Maher	6-8	1-0	Kilkenny
1896	P. Byrne, P. Doherty, M. Maher, E. Maher, T. Condon, J. Walsh, N. Brennan, M. Wall, W. Devane, J. Flanagan, T. Flanagan, T. Ryan, E. Ryan, D. Walsh, J. Maher, J. Connolly, P. Scanlon	8-14	0-4	Dublin
1898	P. Byrne, J. O'Keeffe, E. Maher, M. Maher, F. Maher, J. Walsh, J. Connolly, T. Ryan, W. Devane, E. Ryan, N. Brennan, B. Dunne, T. Condon, D. Walsh, N. Maher, J. Ryan, D. O'Keeffe	7-13	3-10	Kilkenny
1899	J. Flanagan, Big Bill Gleeson, Joe O'Keeffe, J. Gleeson, R. O'Keeffe, James O'Keeffe, D. Walsh, M. Maher, J. Walsh, T. Condon, P. Byrne, W. Dunne, J. Maher, Little Bill Gleeson, T. Ryan, M. Wall, J. Ryan	3-12	1-4	Wexford
1900	T. Allen, E. Hayes, Big Bill Gleeson, P. Hayes, M. Purcell, M. Maher, E. Maher, M. Ryan, P. Maher, J. Walsh, W. Maher, Little Bill Gleeson, T. Ryan, M. Wall, J. O'Keeffe, T. Semple, Jack Gleeson	2-5	0-6	London
1906	J. Hayes, T. Semple, J. O'Brien, P. Burke, M. O'Brien, T. Kerwick, P. Brolan, H. Shelley, J. Mockler, T. Kenna, P. Riordan, T. Allen, P. Maher, J. O'Keeffe, J. Gleeson, T. Gleeson, J. Burke	3-16	2-8	Dublin
1908 (Draw)	J. Moloughney, T. Semple, J. O'Brien, P. Burke, M. O'Brien, T. Kerwick, P. Brolan, H. Shelley, J. Mockler, T. Kenna, P. Fitzgerald, A. Carew, J. Fitzgerald, M. O'Dwyer, J. Gleeson, T. Gleeson, J. Burke	2-5 3-15	1-8 1-5	Dublin
1916	A. O'Donnell, T. Duane, J. Doherty, J. Power, T. Shanahan, J. Collison, J. Fitzpatrick, J. Leahy, H. Shelley, W. Dwyer, J. Murphy, P. Leahy, R. Walsh, B. Dwyer, D. Walsh	5-4	3-2	Kilkenny
1925	A. O'Donnell, M. Darcy, M. Mockler, J. Hayes, M. Kennedy, S. Hackett, J. Power, P. Leahy, J. Leahy, T. Duffy, J. Darcy, P. Cahill, W. Ryan, P. O'Dwyer, P. Power. Sub: S. Kenny	5-6	1-5	Galway
1930	T. O'Meara, J. O'Loughlin, M. Ryan, J. Harney, J. Maher, J. Lanigan, J. Callinan, P. McKenna, M. Kennedy, P. Cahill, P. Purcell, T. Leahy, T. Butler, T. Treacy, M. Cronin. Sub: J. Heaney	2-7	1-3	Dublin
1937	T. Butler, D. O'Gorman, G. Cornally, J. Ryan, J. Lanigan, J. Maher, B. Wall, J. Cooney, J. Gleeson, J. Coffey, T. Doyle, W. O'Donnell, T. Treacy, D. Murphy, P. Ryan. Subs: D. Mackey, T. Kennedy	3-11	0-3	Kilkenny
1945	J. Maher, J. Devitt, G. Cornally, F. Coffey, M. Murphy, J. Maher, T. Purcell, H. Goldsboro, T. Wall, M. Ryan, T. Doyle, E. Gleeson, J. Coffey, A. Brennan, P. Ryan. Subs: None	5-6	3-6	Kilkenny
1949	T. Reddan, M. Byrne, A. Brennan, J. Doyle, P. Stakelum, F. Coffey, T. Doyle, S. Kenny, P. Shanahan, Tommy Ryan, M. Ryan, J. Kennedy, J. Ryan, S. Maher, S. Bannon. Sub: P. Kenny	3-11	0-3	Laois
1950	T. Reddan, M. Byrne, A. Brennan, J. Doyle, J. Finn, P. Stakelum, T. Doyle, S. Bannon, P. Shanahan, E. Ryan, M. Ryan, S. Kenny, P. Kenny, S. Maher, J. Kennedy. Sub: Tommy Ryan	1-9	1-8	Kilkenny
1951	A. Reddan, M. Byrne, A. Brennan, J. Doyle, J. Finn, P. Stakelum, T. Doyle, J. Hough, P. Shanahan, E. Ryan, M. Ryan, Tim Ryan, P. Kenny, S. Maher, S. Bannon. Sub: S. Kenny	7-7	3-9	Wexford
1958	J. O'Grady, M. Byrne, M. Maher, K. Carey, J. Finn, A. Wall, Jn Doyle, J. Hough, T. English, D. Nealon, T. Larkin, Jas Doyle, L. Keane, L. Devaney, L. Connolly. Subs: None	4-9	2-5	Galway
1961	D. O'Brien, M. Hassett, M. Maher, K. Carey, M. Burns, A. Wall, Jn Doyle, M. O'Gara, T. English, Jas Doyle, L. Devaney, D. Nealon, J. McKenna, W. Moloughney, T. Moloughney. Subs: T. Ryan (Killenaule), S. McLoughlin, J. Hough	0-16	1-12	Dublin
1962	D. O'Brien, Jn Doyle, M. Maher, K. Carey, M. O'Gara, A. Wall, M. Burns, L. Devaney, T. English, Jas Doyle, J. McKenna, T. Ryan (Killenaule), D. Nealon, T. Moloney, S. McLoughlin. Subs: L. Connolly, T. Ryan (Toomevara)	3-10	2-11	Wexford
1964	J. O'Donoghue, Jn Doyle, M. Maher, K. Carey, M. Burns, A. Wall, M. Murphy, T. English, M. Roche, Jas Doyle, L. Kiely, M. Keating, D. Nealon, J. McKenna, S. McLoughlin. Subs: M. Lonergan, L. Devaney	5-13	2-8	Kilkenny
1965	J. O'Donoghue, Jn Doyle, M. Maher, K. Carey, M. Burns, A. Wall, L. Gaynor, T. English, M. Roche, Jas Doyle, L. Kiely, L. Devaney, D. Nealon, J. McKenna, S. McLoughlin	2-16	0-10	Wexford
1971	P. O'Sullivan, L. King, J. Kelly, J. Gleeson, T. O'Connor, M. Roche, L. Gaynor, P.J. Ryan, S. Hogan, F. Loughnane, N. O'Dwyer, D. Ryan, J. Flanagan, R. Ryan, M. Keating. Subs: Jas Doyle, P. Byrne	5-17	5-14	Kilkenny
1989	K. Hogan, J. Heffernan, C. O'Donovan, N. Sheehy, Conal Bonnar, B. Ryan (Capt.), J. Kennedy, Colm Bonnar, D. Carr, J. Leahy, D. Ryan, M. Cleary, P. Fox, Cormac Bonnar, N. English. Subs: J. Hayes, D. O'Connell, A. Ryan	4-24	2-9	Antrim
1991	K. Hogan, R.D. Martin, N. Sheehy, M. Ryan, Colm Bonnar, B. Ryan, Conal Bonnar, D. Carr (Capt.), A. Ryan, M. Cleary, D. Ryan, J. Leahy, P. Fox, Cormac Bonnar, N. English. Subs: C. Stakelum, D. O'Connell	1-16	0-15	Kilkenny
2001	B. Cummins, T. Costello, P. Maher, P. Ormonde, E. Corcoran, D. Kennedy, P. Kelly, E. Enright, T. Dunne (Capt.), M. O'Leary, J. Carroll, E. Kelly, E. O'Neill, D. Ryan, L. Corbett. Subs: D. Fahey, M. Ryan, P. O'Brien, C. Gleeson	2-18	2-15	Galway
2010	Brendan Cummins, Paddy Stapleton, Paul Curran, Michael Cahill, Declan Fanning, Conor O'Mahony, Padraic Maher, Brendan Maher, Shane McGrath, Gearóid Ryan, Patrick Maher, John O'Brien, Noel McGrath, Eoin Kelly (Capt.), Lar Corbett	4-17	1-18	Kilkenny
2016	Darren Gleeson, Cathal Barrett, James Barry, Michael Cahill, Seamus Kennedy, Ronan Maher, Padraic Maher, Brendan Maher (Capt.), Michael Breen, Dan McCormack, Patrick Maher, Noel McGrath, John O’Dwyer, Seamus Callanan, John McGrath	2-29	2-20	Kilkenny
2019	Brian Hogan, Cathal Barrett, Barry Heffernan, Ronan Maher; Brendan Maher, Padraic Maher, Seamus Kennedy, Noel McGrath, Michael Breen, Dan McCormack, John O'Dwyer, Niall O'Meara, Jason Forde, Séamus Callanan (Capt.), John McGrath	3-25	0-20	Kilkenny
2025	Rhys Shelly, Robert Doyle, Eoghan Connolly, Michael Breen, Craig Morgan, Ronan Maher (capt), Bryan O'Mara, Willie Connors, Conor Stakelum, Jake Morris, Andrew Ormond, Sam O’Farrell, Darragh McCarthy, John McGrath, Jason Forde	3-27	1-18	Cork

=== All-Ireland Under-21 Hurling Championships: 12 ===
- 1964, 1967, 1979, 1980, 1981, 1985, 1989, 1995, 2010, 2018, 2019, 2025

Year	Team	Score	Score	Opponent
1964	P. O'Sullivan, W. Smith, N. O'Gorman, M. O'Meara, O' Killoran, C. Dwyer, L. Gaynor, M. Roche, J. Fogarty, N. Lane, M. Keating, F. Loughnane, J. Dillon, T. Butler, T. Brennan. Sub: P.J. Ryan	8-9	3-10	Wexford
1967	H. Condon, S. Ryan, J. Kelly, D. Grady, M. Esmond, T. O'Connor, S. Hogan, P.J. Ryan, C. Davitt, P. Lowry, N. O'Dwyer, J. Ryan, J. Walsh, P. O'Connor, J. Flanagan. Subs: M. Nolan, T. Delaney	1-8	1-7	Dublin
1979	V. Mullins, P. Loughnane, J. Ryan, E. Hogan, A. Slattery, J. O'Dwyer, G. Stapleton, G. O'Connor, P. Fox, M. Murphy, E. O'Shea, T. Grogan, B. Mannion, M. Doyle, P. Looby. Sub: P. Ryan	2-12	1-9	Galway
1980	V. Mullins, M. Ryan, Cormac Bonnar, P. Fox, B. Heffernan, J. O'Dwyer, P. McGrath, M. Kennedy, P. Kennedy, M. Murphy, B. Ryan, A. Buckley, J. Kennedy, D. O'Connell, P. Power. Sub: A. Kinsella	2-9	0-14	Kilkenny
1981	J. Farrell, M. Ryan, P. Brennan, P. Fox, I. Conroy, J. McIntyre, P. McGrath, A. Kinsella, P. Kennedy, N. English, B. Ryan, M. McGrath, G. O'Neill, D. O'Connell, A. Buckley	2-16	1-10	Kilkenny
1985	J. Leamy, N. McDonnell, P. O'Donoghue, Colm Bonnar, M. Corcoran, D. Kealy, P. Delaney, J. Kennedy, A. Ryan, M. Cunningham, J. McGrath, N. Sheehy, J. McCormack, L. Stokes, M. Scully. Sub: M. Bryan	1-10	2-6	Kilkenny
1989	B. Bane, L. Sheedy, M. Ryan, G. Frend, J. Madden, Conal Bonnar, S. Maher, J. Leahy, Declan Ryan, P. Hogan, C. Stakelum, Dinny Ryan, M. Nolan, D. Quirke, T. Lanigan. Subs: J. Cahill, K. Ryan, D. Lyons	4-10	3-11	Offaly
1995	B. Cummins, L. Barron, P. Shelly, P. Shanahan, B. Horgan, K. Slevin, B. Flannery, A. Butler, Terence Dunne, Thomas Dunne, L. McGrath, E. Enright, K. Tucker, D. O'Connor, D. Bourke. Sub: P. O'Dwyer	1-14	1-10	Kilkenny
2010	J. Logue, K. O'Gorman, P. Maher, M. Cahill, J. Barry, B. Maher, C. Hough, S. Hennessy, N. McGrath, S. Carey, P. Murphy, P. Maher, M. Heffernan, B. O'Meara, J. O'Dwyer Subs used:C. Coughlan, J. O'Neill, A. Ryan, J. Gallagher, K. Morris.	5-22	0-12	Galway
2018	B Hogan, E Connolly, B McGrath, K O'Dwyer, P Campion, R Byrne, D Quirke, S Nolan, G Browne, C English (c), J Cahill, P Feehan, J Morris, M Kehoe, C Darcy Subs used:C Stakelum, D Gleeson, C Morgan, P Cadell, L Fairbrother.	3-13	1-16	Cork
2019	Aaron Browne, Conor McCarthy, Eoghan Connolly, Craig Morgan (c), Niall Heffernan, Paddy Cadell, Bryan O’Mara, Ciaran Connolly, Jerome Cahill, Gearoid O’Connor, Jake Morris, Johnny Ryan, Andrew Ormond, Billy Seymour, Conor Bowe Subs used: Sean Hayes, Kian O’Kelly, Joe Fogarty, Cathal Bourke.	5-17	1-18	Cork
2025	Eoin Horgan, Cathal O’Reilly, Aaron O’Halloran, Sam O’Farrell (c), Adam Ryan, Podge O’Dwyer, Jim Ryan, Joe Egan, Adam Daly, Cathal English, Conor Martin, David Costigan, Darragh McCarthy, Paddy McCormack, Oisín O’Donoghue. Subs used:Cormac Fitzpatrick for Costigan (50), Mason Cawley for Egan (54), Jamie Ormond for Martin (57), Senan Butler for McCormack (59), Paddy Phelan for Daly (60).	3-19	1-16	Kilkenny

=== All-Ireland Minor Hurling Championships: 22 ===
- 1930, 1932, 1933, 1934, 1947, 1949, 1952, 1953, 1955, 1956, 1957, 1959, 1976, 1980, 1982, 1996, 2006, 2007, 2012, 2016, 2022, 2024

Year	Team	Score	Score	Opponent
1930	E. Maher, J. Coffey, W. O'Neill, L. Burke, G. Heavey, J. Coffey, J. Lanigan, J. Semple, J. Dunne, J. Russell, E. Wade, P. Ryan, J. Close, T. Harney, J. Quinlan. Subs: None	4-1	2-1	Kilkenny
1932	T. O'Keeffe, J. Looby, J. O'Dwyer, M. Burke, P. Leahy, C. Downs, J. Cooney, P. Bowe, N. Barry, P. Purcell, T. Burke, J. Fletcher, W. Nolan, D. Gorman, J. Maher	8-6	5-1	Kilkenny
1933	J. Moloney, J. Mooney, T. Doyle, M. Ryan, M. Condon, M. Everard, P. Duggan, P. Dwyer, T. Brennan, P. Frazer, M. Burke, J. Farrell, P. Callaghan, T. Maher, J. Fletcher	4-6	2-3	Galway
1934	C. Maher, T. Lanigan, J. Noonan, J. Mooney, J. Moloney, J. Coffey, T. English, D. Ryan, T. Brennan, P. Callaghan, M. Loughnane, M. Mockler, Jas Moloney, T. Cawley, P. O'Dwyer	4-3	3-5	Laois
1947	J. O'Grady, J. Doyle, J. McCormack, B. Mockler, C. Keane, J. Ryan, S. Twomey, M. Ryan, J. Farrell, D. Butler, D. McNulty, P. Kenny, T. O'Meara, M. Butler, S. McDonnell. Sub: M. Maher	9-5	1-5	Galway
1949	J. O'Grady, Joseph Moloney, James Moloney, S. Browne, D. Maher, J. Finn, S. McGrath, R. Holden, W. Perkins, A. McDonnell, L. Keane, T. Aherne, M. Buckley, M. Ryan, G. Doyle. Sub: J. Maher	6-5	2-4	Kilkenny
1952	E. McLoughney, D. Quinn, E. McGrath, E. Burke, F. Dyer, W. Hayes, L. Quinn, P. Hennessy, W. Quinn, L. Devaney, A. Wall, S. McLoughlin, M. Butler, D. Browne, P. Cleary. Sub: S. McGovern	9-9	2-6	Dublin
1953	T. McCormack, M. Cleary, T. Kelly, P. Barry, L. Quinn, R. Reidy, S. Kenny, W. Quinn, M. Kennedy, L. Devaney, J. Murphy, S. McLoughlin, S. Corcoran, M. Stapleton, L. Connolly. Sub: R. Ryan	8-6	3-6	Dublin
1955	S. Ryan, T. Gleeson, R. O'Donnell, M. Craddock, D. Ryan, R. Reidy, S. Warren, C. Foyle, M. Burns, J. Doyle, A. Leahy, M. Gilmartin, W. O'Grady, P. Ryan, P. Dorney. Subs: J. Small, M. O'Gara	5-15	2-5	Galway
1956	A. Tierney, T. Gleeson, M. Dorney, B. Maher, M. Craddock, P. Reynolds, J. Mullooly, S. Warren, S. Mackey, J. Doyle, P. Ryan, W. O'Grady, T. Flynn, J. Scott, S. Dalton	4-16	1-5	Kilkenny
1957	T. Moloney, M. Craddock, M. Lonergan, P. Kearns, M. Stapleton, P. Reynolds, A. Croke, M. Murphy, P. Kennedy, S. Ryan, L. Kiely, J. Doyle, P. Doyle, M. Hogan, P. Butler. Subs: W. Hogan, P. Woodlock	4-7	3-7	Kilkenny
1959	J. O'Donoghue, P. Griffin, G. Kinane, W. Lonergan, J. Carroll, A. Croke, R. Slevin, Tom Ryan (Toomevara), Tom Ryan (Killenaule), P. Doyle, W. Carey, M. Duggan, M. Nolan, L. Kiely, J. Ryan. Subs: J. Gleeson, P. Crampton	2-8	2-7	Kilkenny
1976	V. Mullins, P. Loughnane, P.J. Maxwell, A. Slattery, M. Stapleton, G. Stapleton, J. O'Dwyer, J. Hogan, P. Ryan, E. O'Shea, M. Doyle, T. Grogan, M. Murphy, J. Stone, P. Power. Sub: P. Looby	2-20	1-7	Kilkenny
1980	K. Hogan, M. Conway, P. Maher, E. Hogan, I. Conroy, J. Maher, D. Finnerty, J. Hayes, P. Kenny, G. O'Neill, M. McGrath, J. Darcy, A. Browne, W. Peters, N. English. Subs: V. Dooley, J. Treacy	2-15	1-10	Wexford
1982	J. Leamy, J. Flannery, J. Bergin, Colm Bonnar, B. Everard, D. Kealy, W. Hayes, J. Kennedy, G. Bradley, N. Sheehy, M. Cunningham, S. Slattery, J. Cormack, L. Stokes, M. Scully. Subs: M. Corcoran, G. Ryan, A. Ryan	2-7	0-4	Galway
1996 (Draw)	F. Horgan, T. Costello, F. Heaney, W. Hickey, T. Keane, J. Carroll, J. Tehan, W. Maher, M. Ryan, D. Browne, D. Fahey, P. Kelly, A. Doyle, E. O'Neill, M. Kennedy. Subs: P. Lonergan, P. O'Brien, E. Carey	0-20 2-14	3-11 2-12	Galway
2006	J Ryan, M Cahill, P Maher, B Maher; E Hogan, T Stapleton, J O'Keeffe; J McLoughney, G Ryan; S Hennessy, T McGrath, N Bergin; P Bourke, T Dunne, T Dalton. Subs - M Gleeson, S Callinan.	2-18	2-7	Galway
2007	TJ Logue, K O'Gorman, P Maher, S O'Brien; J Barry, J Coghlan, M Cahill; B Maher, N McGrath; S Hennessy, C Lorrigan, S Carey; J O'Neill, P Maher, M Heffernan. Subs - P Murphy, J Gallagher, D O'Brien, D O'Connor.	3-14	2-11	Cork
2012	Paul Maher, Ronan Maher, Michael Breen, Jack Peters, Tom Fox, Tomas Hamill, Barry Heffernan, Bill Maher (c), Stephen Cahill, John McGrath, Dylan Fitzell, Sean Maher, Tadhg Gallagher, Jack Shelly, Mark McCarthy. Subs used: Steven O'Brien, Sean Ryan, Conor Lanigan, Jack Loughnane.	2-18	1-11	Dublin
2016	Ciarán Barrett, Killian O’Dwyer, Michael Whelan, Tom Murphy, Cian Flanagan, Brian McGrath (Capt.), Jerome Cahill, Paddy Cadell, Ger Browne, Rian Doody, Jake Morris, Colin English, Cian Darcy, Mark Kehoe, Lyndon Fairbrother	1-21	0-17	Limerick
2022	Eoin Horgan, Chris O'Donnell, Aaron O'Halloran, Jack Quinlan, Sam O'Farrell (c), Tadhg Sheehan, Jack O'Callaghan, Ciarán Foley, Adam Daly, Joe Egan, Conor Martin, Cathal English, Damien Corbett, Tom Delaney, Paddy McCormack, Subs used: Darragh McCarthy, Senan Butler, Sam Rowan, Jamie Ormond, Paddy Phelan.	1-17	1-16	Offaly
2024	Daire English, Shane Ryan, Cathal O’Reilly (c), Patrick Ryan, David Ryan, Owen O’Dwyer, Jake Donelan-Houlihan, Tiernan Ryan, Darragh O’Hora, Adam Ryan, Euan Murray, Billy O’Brien, Eoghan Doughan, Stefan Tobin, Cillian Minogue Subs used: Austin Duff, Aaron Cagney, Killian Cantwell,	2-17	3-12	Kilkenny

=== All-Ireland Junior Hurling Championships: 9 ===
- 1913, 1915, 1924, 1926, 1930, 1933, 1953, 1989, 1991

Year	Team	Score	Score	Opponent
1913	J. Hammonds, T. Ryan-Lanigan, J. Ryan-Lanigan, T. Delaney, M. Hammonds, P. Purcell, T. Duane, N. McGrath, M. Dwyer, A. O'Donnell, P. Leahy, J. Power, D. Walsh, J. Fitzpatrick, T. Shanahan. Subs: D. Murphy, P. Dargan	4-2	0-0	Kilkenny
1915	J. Fitzpatrick, M. Leahy, J. Campbell, W. Dwyer, T. Shanahan, J. Hammonds, W. Quinn, T. Duane, F. Cronin, D. Walsh, T. Donovan, J. Doore, W. Horan, J. Kennedy, M. Leahy	1-6	2-2	Offaly
1924	J. O'Loughlin, W. O'Brien, S. Duane, J. Costelloe, J. Gleeson, T. O'Meara, P. Purcell, J. Hickey, M. Flanagan, M. Ryan, P. Kennedy, T. Maher, R. Nealon, M. Aherne, M. Kennedy. Sub: W. O'Meara	5-5	2-4	Galway
1926	T. Butler, A. Cleary, E, Browne, M. Cronin, T. Crowe, J. Moylan, P. Hogan, P. Harty, J. Hayes, M. Ryan (Newport), M. Ryan (Boherlahan), T. Treacy, T. Leahy, J. O'Gorman, E. Walsh	6-2	2-3	Galway
1930	M. Browne, J. Dwyer, J. Fletcher, P. Furlong, W. Gorman, S. Harrington, T. Connolly, P. Harty, T. Harty, M. McGann, M. Ryan (Clonoulty), E. Wade, M. Ryan (Borris-ileigh), D. Looby, W. Ryan	8-6	3-2	Kilkenny
1933	D. Roche, W. Roche, P. O'Mahony, P. O'Toole, J. Dunne, E. Eade, P. O'Keeffe, D. Looby, D. Hayes, J. Tynan, J. Duggan, D. Gorman, D. Murphy, D. Ryan, D. Gleeson. Subs: J. Cooney, M. O'Toole	10-1	1-4	London
1953	M. Fogarty, T. Kennedy, M. Doheny, S. Kelly, J. Callanan, S. Organ, T. Sweeney, J. Ryan, M. Conway, T. English, M. Kenny, J. Hannon, T. Foran, E. Hayes, K. McKenna	4-10	1-3	Warwickshire
1989	J. Grace, M. Stapleton, M. Ryan, D. Quinlan, G. O'Brien, R. Quirke, L. Sheedy, E. Kelly, K. Laffan, Dinny Ryan, P. Everard, D. Flannery, M. McCormack, J. Sheedy, S. Nealon. Sub: C. Egan	0-12	0-8	Galway
1991	J. Leamy, M. Ryan (Fethard), M. Stapleton, D. Quinlan, P. Maguire, G. O'Brien, S. McManus, O. Cummins, C. Bryan, P. O'Keeffe, L. Sheedy, E. Maher, J. Harrington, E. Kelly, S. Nealon. Sub: M. Ryan (Ballinahinch)	4-17	1-5	London

=== All-Ireland Intermediate Hurling Championships: 7 ===
  - 1963, 1966, 1971, 1972, 2000, 2012, 2013

=== All-Ireland Vocational Schools Championships:14 ===
  - 1962, 1964, 1965, 1966, 1967, 1968, 1969, 1974, 1978, 1988, 1990, 2004, 2010, 2011 (1962-1978 winners were North Tipperary)

=== National Hurling Leagues: 19 ===
  - 1928, 1949, 1950, 1952, 1954, 1955, 1957, 1959, 1960, 1961, 1964, 1965, 1968, 1979, 1988, 1994, 1999, 2001, 2008

=== Munster Senior Hurling Championships: 42 ===
  - 1895, 1896, 1898, 1899, 1900, 1906, 1908, 1909, 1913, 1916, 1917, 1922, 1924, 1925, 1930, 1937, 1941, 1945, 1949, 1950, 1951, 1958, 1960, 1961, 1962, 1964, 1965, 1967, 1968, 1971, 1987, 1988, 1989, 1991, 1993, 2001, 2008, 2009, 2011, 2012, 2015,2016

=== Munster Under-21 Hurling Championships: 23 ===
  - 1964, 1965, 1967, 1972, 1978, 1979, 1980, 1981, 1983, 1984, 1985, 1989, 1990, 1995, 1999, 2003, 2004, 2006, 2008, 2010, 2019, 2024, 2025

=== Munster Minor Hurling Championships: 43 ===
- 1930, 1931, 1932, 1933, 1934, 1935, 1945, 1946, 1947, 1949, 1950, 1952, 1953, 1954, 1955, 1956, 1957, 1959, 1960, 1961, 1962, 1973, 1976, 1980, 1982, 1983, 1987, 1991, 1993, 1996, 1997, 1999, 2001, 2002, 2003, 2007, 2012, 2015, 2016, 2018, 2022, 20242026

=== Munster Junior Hurling Championships: 16 ===
- 1910, 1911, 1913, 1915, 1924, 1926, 1928, 1930, 1933, 1951, 1953, 1985, 1988, 1989, 1990, 1991

=== Munster Intermediate Hurling Championships: 9 ===
  - 1961, 1963, 1966, 1971, 1972, 2000, 2002, 2012, 2013

=== Waterford Crystal Cup: 4 ===
  - 2007, 2008, 2012, 2014

=== Wembley Tournament (Monaghan Cup): 20 ===
  - 1931, 1938, 1939, 1940, 1946, 1947, 1949, 1950, 1951, 1952, 1953, 1954, 1955, 1956, 1961, 1962, 1963, 1964, 1965, 1969, 1972

=== Thomond Feis: 8 ===
  - 1915, 1916, 1924, 1927, 1930, 1931, 1949, 1951

=== Oireachtas Tournament: 11 ===
  - 1945, 1949, 1960, 1961, 1963, 1964, 1965, 1968, 1970, 1972, 1990

== Camogie ==
- All-Ireland Senior Camogie Championships: 5
  - 1999, 2000, 2001, 2003, 2004
- All-Ireland Minor Camogie Championships: 1
  - 2011

2024

- All Ireland Under-16 camogie championships: 4
  - 1990, 1992, 1993, 2011
- All-Ireland Junior Camogie Championships: 3
  - 1992, 2001, 2024
- National Camogie League: 3
  - 1976, 2004, 2024

=== All-Star Awards: 17 ===
  - 2004: S. Kelly, U. O'Dwyer, C. Gaynor, T. Brophy, C. Grogan, D. Hughes
  - 2005: J. Delaney, J. Kirwan, C. Grogan, E. McDonnell
  - 2006: J. Delaney, S. Kelly, P. Fogarty, J. Ryan
  - 2007: P. Fogarty, C. Grogan
  - 2008: T. O'Halloran,

== Football ==
=== All-Ireland Senior Football Championships: 4 ===
- 1889, 1895, 1900, 1920

Year	Team	Score	Score	Opponent
1889	T. Finn, J. Crowley, P. Glasheen, W. O'Shea, W. Ryan, B. O'Brien, G. Kavanagh, P. Buckley, D. Whelan, P. Hall, M. Wade, J. Ryan, Joe Ryan, D. Keating, P. Fox, J. Rowland, Willie Ryan, P. Ryan, J. Carey, J. Daly, T. Dwyer	3-6	0-0	Laois
1895	M. McInerney, M. Finn, J. Riordan, P. Finn, W. Ryan, J. Heffernan, J. O'Brien, B. Finn, P. Dwyer, P. Glasheen, J. Carey, M. Conroy, J. Carew, W.P. Ryan, D. Butler, P. Daly, R. Quane.	0-4	0-3	Meath
1900	P. Moloney, M. Walsh, P. Wall, W. McReil, J. Duane, D. Myers, J. O'Brien, J. Tobin, R. Hourigan, R. Quane, B. O'Toole, D. Harney, J. O'Shea, P. Cox, J. Hayes, J. Cooney, D. Smith	3-7	0-2	London
1920	A. Carroll, N. O'Shea, J. McNamara, B. Ryan, B. Lanigan, J. Shelly, B. Grant, W. Barrett, J. Ryan, M. Tobin, J. Doran, G. McCarthy, V. Vaughan, M. Arrigan, T. Powell	1-6	1-2	Dublin

=== All-Ireland Senior B Football Championships: 1 ===
- 1995

=== All-Ireland Under-21 Football Championships: None ===
- The furthest Tipp have gotten is an All-Ireland final in 2015 against Tyrone.

=== All-Ireland Minor Football Championships: 2 ===
- 1934, 2011

Year	Team	Score	Score	Opponent
1934	A. Greensmith, J. O'Connor, B. Power, M. Byrne, H. O'Donnell, J. Hickey, M. Lalor, D. McGrath, T. Kenny, C. Dillon, M. Gavin, J. Maher, M. Power, P. Blanchfield, B. Kissane.	W.O.		1
2011	E. Comerford, N. O'Sullivan, J. Meagher, C. O'Sullivan, C. O'Riordan, D. Fitzelle, S. Kennedy, S. O'Brien, I. Fahey, G. Henry, J. McGrath, B. Maher, L. McGrath, M. Quinlivan, T.J. Ryan.	3-9	1-14	Dublin

=== All-Ireland Junior Football Championships: 3 ===
- 1912, 1923, 1998

Year	Team	Score	Score	Opponent
1912	J. O'Shea, E. Delahunty, L. Gorman, N. Egan, F. O'Brien, N. O'Shea, N. Vaughan, M. Devitt, T. Connors, H. Kennedy, D. Stapleton, J. Quinn, P. Egan, W. Scully, R. Heffernan, P. Dwyer, J. Shelly	1-4	1-3	Louth
1923	T. Hogan, P. Walsh, H. Dillon, G. Dwyer, M. Barry, N. Cummins, M. Nolan, D. Mullins, T. Tubridy, G. McCarthy, P. Duane, T. Armitage, T. Dunne, J. Davey, J. Delaney	2-4	1-1	Carlow
1998	S. Delahunty, D. Byrne, F. Clifford, M. O'Mahony, P. Lanigan, D. Peters, W. Morrissey, P. Ormond, M. Leonard, P. Cahill, M. O'Shea, B. Maguire, K. Coonan, A. Cross, T. Sheehan. Subs: J. McAuliffe, D. O'Brien	2-9	0-6	Offaly

=== National Football Leagues: 3 ===
Year	Team	Score	Score	Opponent
2009 (Div 3)	P. Fitzgerald, C. Morrissey, C. McDonald, A. Morrissey, B. Fox, H. Coghlan, C. Aylward, G. Hannigan, B. Jones, S. Carey, N. Fitzgerald, B. Mulvihill, J. Tierney, B. Coen, B. Grogan. Subs used: R. Costigan, D. O’Brien, C. Higgins, J. Cagney, K. Mulryan.	0-18	1-14	Down
2014 (Div 4)	P Fitzgerald; J Coghlan, P Codd (Captain), A Morrissey; R Kiely (0-01), P Acheson, D Leahy; S O'Brien (0-01), G Hannigan (0-01); B Fox, I Fahey (0-01), P Austin; C Sweeney (1-08, 0-04f), M Quinlivan, B Grogan (0-04, 0-02f). Subs used: S Grogan for Austin, C McDonald for Morrissey, C O'Riordan for Fahey, C McCullagh for S Grogan (black card).	1-16	1-15	Clare
2017 (Div 3)	E Comerford; A Campbell (0-1), P Codd, W Connors; R Kiely (0-1), S O’Connell, B Maher; L Casey (1-1), J Kennedy (0-2); J Keane (0-1), K O’Halloran (0-3, 2f), B Fox (C); C Sweeney (2-5, 0-3f), M Quinlivan (0-3, 2f), E Moloney. Subs: G Hannigan for Moloney (52), LBoland (0-1) for O’Halloran (61), C O’Shaughnessy for Connors (64), A Moloney for Kennedy (66), L McGrath (0-1) for Keane (70+1), J Hennessy for Quinlivan (70+6).	3-19	0-19	Louth

=== Munster Senior Football Championships: 10 ===
- 1888, 1889, 1895, 1900, 1902, 1918, 1920, 1922, 1935, 2020

Year	Team	Score	Score	Opponent
2020	E Comerford; C O’Shaughnessy, A Campbell, J Feehan; B Maher, K Fahey, R Kiely; S O’Brien, L Casey; B Fox, M Quinlivan, C O’Riordan; Colman Kennedy, C Sweeney (c), Conal Kennedy. Subs: L Boland for Colman Kennedy (52); P Feehan for K Fahey (54); E Moloney for B Fox (61); P Looram for R Kiely (65); P Austin for L Casey (70+1).	0-17	0-14	Cork

=== Munster Under-21 Football Championships: 2 ===
Year	Team	Score	Score	Opponent
2010	K. Kenrick, R. Kiely, C. McDonald, D. Lynch, P. O'Dwyer, J. Coghlan, D. O'Dwyer, A. Moloney, P. Acheson, S. Carey, B. O'Brien, A. Matassa, C. Sweeney, B. O'Meara, M. O'Dwyer. Subs used: P. Curtin, G. O'Keeffe.	1-7	1-6	Kerry
2015	E Comerford, C O’Shaughnessy, J Feehan, K Fahey, R Mulcahy, L Boland, B Maher, S O’Brien, C O’Riordan, J Lonergan, I Fahey, L Casey, K O’Halloran, J Keane, P Maher. Subs used: TJ Ryan, W Connors	1-15	3-8	Cork

=== Munster Minor Football Championships: 7 ===
- 1934, 1935, 1955, 1984, 1995, 2011, 2012

=== Munster Junior Football Championships: 7 ===
- 1910, 1912, 1923, 1935, 1937, 1952, 1998

=== Tommy Murphy Cup: 1 ===
Year	Team	Score	Score	Opponent
2005	P. Fitzgerald, D. Byrne, N. Curran, P. King, P. Morrissey, B. Lacey, R. Costigan, K. Mulryan, N. Fitzgerald, A. Fitzgerald, B. Hickey, B. Hahessy, B. Mulvihill, D. Browne (capt), D. O'Brien.	3-10	0-15	Wexford

=== McGrath Cups:3 ===
- 1989, 1993, 2003

Year	Team	Score	Score	Opponent
1989	Ger Enright, Michael Ryan (Upperchurch-Drombane), Brian Lawlor, Tom Macken, Donal O’Keeffe, Ned Ryan, Sean Brett, Gene McGrath, Declan Hahessy, Brian Burke (Captain), John Costello, Eamon Maher, Anthony Crosse, Cristoir McGrath, John Treacy. Subs: Tommy Sheehan for Maher, Ruan Morris for Treacy, Anthony Power for Hahessy, Johnny Lowry, Davy Hogan and Willie Morrissey.			London
1993	Eamonn Ryan, John O’Meara, Sean Collum (Captain), Peter Gleeson, Jerry Ryan, Sean Brett, Tom Macken, Brian Burke, John Costello, Mark Sheehan, John Leahy, Davy Hogan, Peter Lambert, Anthony Crosse, Brendan Cummins Subs: Ned Ryan for Leahy, Chris Coen for Crosse, Ailbe Bonnar, Kevin Coonan and Shay Ryan	2-13	0-4	London
2003	Brian Enright, Benny Hahessy, Niall Kelly, Damien Byrne, Shane Maher, Declan Fanning, Niall Fitzgerald, Kevin Mulryan, Aidan Fitzgerald; Tony Doyle, Fergal O’Callaghan (Captain), Patrick Hally, Benny Hickey, Eamonn Hanrahan, David Byrne Subs: Declan Browne for Hally, John Paul Looby for David Byrne, Patrick Hally for Maher.	1-9	1-8	Clare

=== Munster Football League 2 ===
- 1929-30, 1934-35

=== All-Star Awards: 4 ===
  - 1998: Declan Browne
  - 2003: Declan Browne
  - 2016: Michael Quinlivan
  - 2020: Conor Sweeney

== Ladies' Football ==
- All-Ireland Senior Ladies' Football Championships: 3
  - 1974, 1975, 1980
- All-Ireland Under-18 Ladies' Football Championships: None
- All-Ireland Intermediate Ladies' Football Championships: 3
  - 2008, 2017, 2019
- All-Ireland Under-16 Ladies' Football Championships: 3
  - 1978, 1979, 1980
- National Senior Ladies' Football League Division 1: 1
  - 1979
- National Ladies' Football League Division 2: 1
  - 2018
- National Ladies' Football League Division 3: 1
  - 2005

=== All-Star Awards: 7 ===
  - 1980: A. Maher, J. Stapleton, L. Gory
  - 1981: A. Maher, L. Gory
  - 1982: M. O'Shea
  - 2008: E. Hanly

== Handball ==
- Senior Hardball Singles: 2
  - 1966 (P. Hickey)
  - 1971 (P. Hickey)
- Senior Hardball Doubles: 8
  - 1929 (P. Ormonde & C. Moloney)
  - 1931 (P. Ormonde & C. Moloney)
  - 1962 (J. Ryan & M. Shanahan)
  - 1968 (P. Hickey & C. Cleere)
  - 1972 (P. Hickey & C. Cleere)
  - 1975 (P. Hickey & J. Cleere)
  - 1989 (W. McCarthy & N. Ryan)
  - 1995 (E. Corbett & N. Ryan)
- Senior Softball Singles: 3
  - 1948 (J. Bergin)
  - 1950 (J. Bergin)
  - 1983 (A. Ryan)
- Senior Softball Doubles: 8
  - 1934 (J. Hassett & E. Hassett)
  - 1935 (J. Hassett & E. Hassett)
  - 1936 (J. Hassett & E. Hassett)
  - 1937 (J. Hassett & E. Hassett)
  - 1938 (J. Hassett & E. Hassett)
  - 1942 (J. Collins & C. Collins)
  - 1949 (J. Bergin & J. Sweeney)
  - 1950 (J. Bergin & J. Sweeney)
- Senior 40x20 Singles: 5
  - 1981 (A. Ryan)
  - 1982 (A. Ryan)
  - 1983 (A. Ryan)
  - 1993 (E. Corbett)
  - 1994 (E. Corbett)
- Senior 40x20 Doubles: 1
  - 1991 (E. Corbett & J. O'Donoghue)
