= Gael Linn Cup 1999 =

Tournament details
- Sponsor: Schwarzkopf

Winners
- Champions: Munster (14th title)

Runners-up
- Runners-up: Connacht

Other
- Matches played: 3

The 1999 Gael Linn Cup, the most important representative competition for elite level participants in the women's team field sport of camogie, was won by Munster, who defeated Connacht in the final, played at Bohernabreena. It was the first Gael Linn cu since the introduction of the 15-a-side game, although the competition was played with 15-a-side on an experimental basis in 1995.

== New Sponsor ==
Schwarzkopf sponsored a Player of the Match Award at senior and junior level. Player of the tournament Fiona O'Driscoll and junior winner Lizzie Lyng received replicas of the Gael-Linn Cup and £1,000 for their clubs Fr O'Neill's and Rower–Inistioge). of The Rower-Inistioge.

== Arrangements ==
Connacht defeated Ulster by 1–13 to 1–8, at Bohernabreena, Leinster defeated Ulster 7–38 to 0–4. Munster defeated Connacht by 1–18 to 1–9.

=== Gael Linn Trophy ===
Leinster conceded two early goals before beating Munster 2–10 to 2–8, Connacht defeated Ulster 1–4 to 1–1. Then Leinster defeated Connacht −17 to 4–6 to win the trophy for the first time in 13 years.

=== Final stages ===
Final

Munster	1–18 – 1–8	Connacht

Bohernabreena

Munster	Connacht

|}

Munster:
GK	1	Cora Keohane (Cork)
RCB	2	Claire Madden (Tipperary)
FB	3	Eithne Duggan (Cork)
LCB	4	Mag Finn (Cork)
RWB	5	Mary O'Connor (Cork)
CB	6	Moira McMahon (Clare)
LWB	7	Vivienne Harris (Cork)
MF	8	Ursula Tory (Cork)
MF	9	Linda Mellerick (Cork)
RWF	10	Noelle Kennedy (Tipperary)
CF	11	Fiona O'Driscoll (Cork)
LWF	12	Sinéad O'Callaghan (Cork)
RCF	13	Lynn Dunlea (Cork)
FF	14	Deirdre Hughes (Tipperary)
LCF	15	Vera Sheehan (Limerick)

Connacht:
GK	1	Louise Curry (Galway)
RCB	2	Fiona Ryan (Galway)
FB	3	Helen Ryan (Galway)
LCB	4	Pamela Nevin (captain) (Galway)
RWB	5	Anna Broderick (Galway)
CB	6	Olive Broderick (Galway)
LWB	7	Rita Broderick (Galway)
MF	8	Anne Hardiman (Galway)
MF	9	Aoife Lynskey (Galway)
RWF	10	Tracy Laheen (Galway)
CF	11	Áine Hillary (Galway)
LWF	12	Veronica Curtin (Galway)
RCF	13	Fiona Healy (Galway)
FF	14	Colette Nevin (Galway)
LCF	15	Caroline Murray (Galway)

== Junior Final ==
Final

Leinster	3–17 –4-6	Connacht

Bohernabreena

Leinster	Connacht

|}

Leinster:
GK	1	Linda Byrne (Dublin)
RCB	2	Dolores Lanigan (Killkenny)
FB	3	Brigid Barnaville (Killkenny) captain
LCB	4	Liz O'Donoghue (Kildare)
RWB	5	Claire O'Connor (Wexford)
CB	6	Eimear Lyng (Killkenny)
LWB	7	Mary Ellen Butler (Killkenny)
MF	8	Kathleen Atkins (Killkenny)
MF	9	Louise O'Hara (Dublin)
RWF	10	Aoife O'Connor (Wexford)
CF	11	Michelle O'Leary (Wexford)
LWF	12	Noeleen Lambert (Wexford)
RCF	13	Olivia Maye (Carlow)
FF	14	Martina Maher (Killkenny)
LCF	15	Lizzie Lyng (Killkenny)

Connacht:
GK	1	Fiona Gohery (Galway)
RCB	2	Sinéad Kennedy (Galway)
FB	3	Tara Keeley (Galway)
LCB	4	Paula Carrick (Galway)
RWB	5	Claire Conroy (Galway)
CB	6	Doreen Kelly (Galway)
LWB	7	Donna Burke (Galway)
MF	8	Colleen Crowe (Galway)
MF	9	Orla Watson (Galway)
RWF	10	Marguerite Corless (Galway)
CF	11	Karen Ryan (Galway)
LWF	12	Karen Huban (Galway)
RCF	13	Mairéad Mahony (Galway)
FF	14	Elaine Kerins (Galway)
LCF	15	Aoife Lynskey (Galway)

Preceded by Gael Linn Cup 1998	Gael Linn Cup; 1954 – present	Succeeded by Gael Linn Cup 2000
