= Camogie in County Kildare =

Camogie in County Kildare is administered by the Kildare County Board of the Camogie Association.

== History ==
Camogie was played in Kildare since the sport was first organised in 1904, although records are sparse. Athy Ladies Hurling Club advertised a members reunion in July 1909. Newbridge, Naas, Blacktrench, Prosperous and Ballymore applied unsuccessfully for affiliation to Kildare GAA board in 1921. Kildare sent delegates to the camogie congress of 1932, and a county board was formed in 1934 with Fr Byrne CC of Caragh as President, Mrs B McCarthy as vice-president, William Fisher of Newbridge as secretary, and Polly Smyth of Newbridge as treasurer. Camogie was reorganised at a county convention in 1954, and has been played in Kildare continuously since.

After a series of successes at the junior level, Kildare was defeated by Cork in the National League semi-final of 1992, despite their best performance at senior level. Kildare teams played in navy and white (1930s), brown and white (1955–60) and blue and white (sporadically since the 1960s). White was adopted as the county colour in April 1963.

Kildare won the Nancy Murray Cup in 2010, having previously won the Kay Mills Cup in 1987, 1989 and 1990, their best period in the game. They also won the second division of the National Camogie League in 2004. They had previously won the second division title in 1986, 1989 and 1990. Kildare contested senior finals in the Leinster championship, notably in 1939, and Ardclough contested the Leinster senior club final in 1968.

Notable players include Broadford players Miriam Malone, who played from the 1960s to the 1980s and won a Junior Player of the Year award in 1989, Gradam Tailte winner Bernie Farrelly, and scoring forwards Marianne Johnson, and Susie O'Carroll from Celbridge who captained UCD to Ashbourne Cup honours and won a Soaring Star award with them in 2009, and Regina Gorman who won a Soaring Star award with them in 2010. Carbury Johnstownbridge and Celbridge all won divisional camogie honours at Féile na nGael. Joan O'Flynn from Celbridge served as president of the Camogie Association). Gloria Lee refereed the All-Ireland SCC final of 1963 and John Pender that of 2005.

Under Camogie's National Development Plan 2010-2015, "Our Game, Our Passion", five new camogie clubs were to be established in the county by 2015.

== Clubs ==
The clubs of Kildare compete in the Kildare Senior Camogie Championship.

== County teams ==
The Kildare senior camogie team represents Kildare in the National Camogie League and the All-Ireland Senior Camogie Championship. There are also intermediate, junior, under-21 and minor teams.

=== County team honours ===
- All-Ireland Junior Camogie Championship: 3
  - 1987, 1989, 1990.
- Nancy Murray Cup: 1
  - 2010.
- National Camogie League
- National Camogie League Division Two (junior) winners: 4
  - 1986, 1989, 1990, 2004
- National Camogie League Division Four winners: 1
  - 2009
- National Camogie League National League Division 1 Semi-finalists: 1
  - 1992.
- All Ireland Intermediate Camogie finalists: 1
  - 1994.
- Leinster Junior Camogie Championships: 11
  - 1961, 1966, 1967 (all Smyco cup), 1969, 1981, 1986, 1987, 1988, 1989, 1990, 1996
- Leinster Under-14 B Championships: 2
  - 1997, 2003.
- Minor Special Blitz: 1
  - 2008
