= McNicholas =

McNicholas is a surname. Notable people with the surname include:

- Conor McNicholas, British journalist and magazine editor
- Derek McNicholas (born 1985), Irish hurler
- John T. McNicholas (1877–1950), Irish-born, American Roman Catholic bishop
- Joseph Alphonse McNicholas (1923–1983), American Roman Catholic bishop
- Lily McNicholas (1909 – 1998), Irish nurse in the Second World War
- Maura McNicholas, Irish camogie player
- Patrick McNicholas (1919–1990), Irish-born Canadian politician
- Paul McNicholas (rugby league) (born 1975), Australian rugby league player
- Steve McNicholas (born 1955), English actor and director

== See also ==
- Archbishop McNicholas High School, a high school in Ohio, United States
