= Aoife Lynskey =

Irish camogie player

Personal information
- Native name: Aoife Ni Lionscaigh (Irish)
- Born: 1980 (age 45–46) Galway, Ireland

Sport
- Sport: Camogie
- Position: Forward
Club*
Years	Club	Apps (scores)
	Ardrahan	?
Inter-county**
Years	County	Apps (scores)
	Galway	?
- * club appearances and scores correct as of (16:31, 30 June 2011 (UTC)). **Inter County team apps and scores correct as of (16:31, 30 June 2011 (UTC)).

Aoife Lynskey (born 1980) is a camogie player, winner of an All Ireland medal in 1996, and a player or panel member on Galway teams defeated in five subsequent All Ireland finals.

== Other awards ==
National Camogie League 2002, 2005, All Ireland Intermediate, All Ireland Junior and Minor medals. Gael Linn Cup, two Ashbourne Cup with University of Limerick, |Féile with club.
