= Catherine O'Loughlin =

Catherine O'Loughlin may refer to:

- Catherine O'Loughlin (Clare camogie player)
- Catherine O'Loughlin (Wexford camogie player)
