= Michael Cleary (hurler) =

Tipperary hurler

Personal information
- Native name: Mícheál Ó Cléirigh (Irish)
- Born: 16 August 1966 (age 60) Nenagh, County Tipperary, Ireland
- Occupation: Retailer
- Height: 5 ft 10 in (178 cm)

Sport
- Sport: Hurling
- Position: Half-forward
Club
- Years: Club
- 1983-2004: Nenagh Éire Óg
Club titles
- Tipperary titles: 1
Inter-county
Years	County	Apps (scores)
1988–1997	Tipperary	26 (10–108)
Inter-county titles
- Munster titles: 4
- All-Irelands: 2
- NHL: 2
- All Stars: 4

Michael Cleary (born 16 August 1966) is an Irish former hurling manager and player. At club level he played with Nenagh Éire Óg and at inter-county level was a member of the Tipperary senior hurling team.

== Early life ==
Born and raised in Nenagh, County Tipperary, Cleary played hurling during his schooldays at Nenagh CBS. He was part of the school's senior team that won the Corn Pádraig title in 1983, following a 3-12 to 1-02 defeat of Dungarvan CBS. Cleary later claimed an All-Ireland Colleges SBHC medal after Nenagh's 1-11 to 1-09 win over Callan CBS in the final.

== Club career ==
Cleary began his career at juvenile and underage levels as a dual player with the Nenagh Éire Óg club before eventually progressing to adult level. He had his first success at adult level in 1983 when Nenagh Éire Óg beat Gortnahoe–Glengoole by 4-08 to 2-09 to claim the Tipperary JHC title. He had success as a Gaelic footballer in 1988 when he won a Tipperary IFC after a 2-04 to 0-09 win over Ballyporeen. Cleary later claimed four North Tipperary SHC medals between 1992 and 2001. He was the championship's top scorer in 1995 when Nenagh Éire Óg beat Boherlahan–Dualla by 2-25 to 2-08 to win their first ever Tipperary SHC title. Cleary added a second Tipperary IFC medal to his collection in 1997 when Nenagh Éire Óg claimed the title after a 3-07 to 1-06 defeat of Carrick Swans in a final replay.

== Inter-county career ==
Cleary first appeared on the inter-county scene with Tipperary during a two-year tenure with the minor team. He won a Munster MHC medal after a 3-15 to 2-08 win over Limerick in 1983. His subsequent two-year tenure with the under-21 team ended without success.

After a number of years away from the inter-county scene, Cleary joined the senior team in January 1988 and made his debut in a National Hurling League game against Waterford. He ended the campaign with his first league winners' medal, while he was an unused substitute when Tipperary beat Cork by 2-19 to 1-13 in 1988 Munster SHC final. Cleary was again an unused substitute for Tipperary's 1-15 to 0-14 defeat by Galway in the 1988 All-Ireland final.

Cleary claimed a second successive Munster SHC medal in 1989 - his first on the field of play. He later won his first All-Ireland SHC medal after scoring three points from wing-forward in the 4-24 to 3-09 defeat of Antrim in the 1989 All-Ireland final. After surrendering their titles in 1990, Cleary won a third Munster SHC medal in four seasons after a 4-19 to 4-15 defeat of Cork. He later claimed a second All-Ireland SHC medal when his mishit free ended up in the net and helped Tipperary to a 1-16 to 0-15 win over Kilkenny in the 1991 All-Ireland final.

Cleary was appointed team captain following Nenagh Éire Óg's club championship success and he led Tipperary to Munster SHC success in 1993. He also claimed a fourth consecutive All-Star award at the end of that season. Cleary added a second National Hurling League title to his collection in 1994, in what proved to be his last silverware with the Tipperary senior team. He captained the team for a second time in 1996, before making his final appearance for the team in a 0-20 to 2-13 defeat by Clare in the 1997 All-Ireland final.

== Inter-provincial career ==
Cleary's performances at inter-county level resulted in his selection for Munster in seven Railway Cup campaigns between 1989 and 1997. He claimed his first winners' medal in 1992 after Munster's 3-12 to 1-08 win over Ulster. Cleary was also part of Munster's three-in-a-row series of successes between 1995 and 1997.

== Management career ==
Cleary first became involved in team management and coaching in 1999 when he became a selector with the Tipperary senior camogie team following a 36-point defeat by Cork in the National Camogie League. Within three months Tipperary became All-Ireland SCC winners after a 0-12 to 1-08 defeat of Kilkenny. Cleary took over as manager in December 1999 and steered the team to further All-Ireland SCC successes in 2000 and 2001. He stepped down as manager following Tipperary's defeat by Cork in the 2002 All-Ireland camogie final. Cleary later served as manager of the Nenagh Éire Óg senior team.

== Honours ==
=== Player ===
Nenagh CBS

- All-Ireland Colleges Senior B Hurling Championship: 1983
- Munster Colleges Senior B Hurling Championship: 1983

Nenagh Éire Óg

- Tipperary Senior Hurling Championship: 1995
- North Tipperary Senior Hurling Championship: 1992, 1993, 1998, 2001
- Tipperary Intermediate Football Championship: 1988, 1997
- Tipperary Junior A Hurling Championship: 1983

Tipperary

- All-Ireland Senior Hurling Championship: 1989, 1991
- Munster Senior Hurling Championship: 1988, 1989, 1991, 1993
- National Hurling League: 1987–88, 1993–94
- Munster Minor Hurling Championship: 1983

Munster

- Railway Cup: 1992, 1995, 1996, 1997

Awards

- All-Star: 1990, 1991, 1992, 1993
- All-Ireland Senior Hurling Championship Top Scorer: 1991

=== Management ===
Tipperary

- All-Ireland Senior Camogie Championship: 1999, 2000, 2001

Sporting positions
Preceded by Michael O'Meara	Tipperary senior hurling team captain 1993	Succeeded by George Frend
Preceded by Tommy Dunne	Tipperary senior hurling team captain 1996	Succeeded by Conor Gleeson
Preceded by Biddy Phillips	Tipperary senior camogie team manager 1999-2002	Succeeded by Raymie Ryan
