= Raymie Ryan =

Tipperary hurler

Personal information
- Native name: Réamonn Ó Riain (Irish)
- Nickname: Raymie
- Born: 16 March 1971 (age 55) Cashel, County Tipperary, Ireland
- Occupation: Shop owner
- Height: 6 ft 0 in (183 cm)

Sport
- Sport: Hurling
- Position: Right wing-back
Club
- Years: Club
- Cashel King Cormacs
Club titles
- Tipperary titles: 1
- Munster titles: 1
Inter-county
| Years | County | Apps (scores) |
| 1992–1999 | Tipperary | 9 (0–02) |
Inter-county titles
- Munster titles: 1
- All-Irelands: 0
- NHL: 2
- All Stars: 0

Raymond Ryan (born 16 March 1971) is an Irish hurling coach and former player. At club level he played with Cashel King Cormacs and at inter-county level with the Tipperary senior hurling team. Ryan also served as manager of a number of club and inter-county teams.

== Playing career ==
Ryan attended Cashel CBS where he played both hurling and Gaelic football to a high standard. During his time there he won Croke Cup, Fitzgerald Cup and Kinane Cup titles.

At club level, Ryan first played for Cashel King Cormacs at juvenile and underage levels. He won a number of divisional and county titles in the minor and under-21 grades before progressing to adult level. Ryan was part of the team when Cashel King Cormacs beat Holycross–Ballycahill by 2–08 to 1–05 to win the club's inaugural Tipperary SHC title in 1991. This was later converted into a Munster Club SHC title.

At inter-county level, Ryan first appeared for Tipperary during a two-year tenure with the minor team, including one season as team captain. He was drafted onto the under-21 team while still eligible for the minor grade and won consecutive Munster U21HC titles. Ryan was a substitute when Tipperary beat Offaly by 4–10 to 3–11 in the 1989 All-Ireland U21HC final.

Ryan was in his final year with Tipperary's under-21 when he joined the senior team. He won a Munster SHC in 1993, before claiming a National Hurling League title the following year. Ryan was a substitute when Tipperary were beaten by Clare in the 1997 All-Ireland SHC final. He won a second National League title in 1999. Ryan also won consecutive Railway Cup medals with Munster.

== Management career ==
In retirement from playing, Ryan continued his involvement in the game as a manager at club and inter-county levels. He managed the Tipperary senior camogie team to consecutive All-Ireland SCC titles in 2003 and 2004. Ryan later took charge of several club teams, including Drom & Inch and Newtownshandrum in Cork. He managed Clough–Ballacolla to thie inaugural Laois SHC title in 2009. Ryan also served one season as Tipperary's minor team manager.

== Honours ==
=== Player ===
Cashel King Cormacs

- Munster Senior Club Hurling Championship (1): 1991
- Tipperary Senior Hurling Championship (1): 1991
- West Tipperary Senior Hurling Championship (6): 1988, 1990, 1991, 1993, 1994, 1995
- West Tipperary Senior Football Championship (1): 1992

Tipperary

- Munster Senior Hurling Championship (1): 1993
- National Hurling League (2): 1993–94, 1999
- All-Ireland Under-21 Hurling Championship (1): 1989
- Munster Under-21 Hurling Championship (2): 1989, 1990

Munster

- Railway Cup (2): 1995, 1996

=== Management ===
Clough–Ballacolla

- Laois Senior Hurling Championship (1): 2009

Tipperary

- All-Ireland Senior Camogie Championship (2): 2003, 2004

Sporting positions
| Preceded by Declan O'Meara | Tipperary minor hurling team captain 1989 | Succeeded by Seán O'Donoghue |
| Preceded by Mark O'Leary | Tipperary minor hurling team manager 2011 | Succeeded by William Maher |
