= Biddy Phillips =

Personal information
- Native name: Bríd Nic Philib (Irish)
- Born: 1956 County Tipperary, Ireland
- Died: 7 July 2010 (aged 53–54)

Sport
- Sport: Camogie
- Position: forward
Clubs*
Years	Club	Apps (scores)
	Ballytrasna and Thurles	?
Inter-county**
Years	County	Apps (scores)
	Tipperary	?
- * club appearances and scores correct as of (16:31, 30 June 2010 (UTC)). **Inter County team apps and scores correct as of (16:31, 30 June 2010 (UTC)).

Brigid "Biddy" Phillips (1956 – 7 July 2010) was a camogie player, administrator, referee and coach who coached Tipperary to their first All Ireland camogie title in 1999.

== Background ==
From Childers Park in Thurles, she played for Tipperary at under 18, juniors and senior in 1971, and for the under 18 and seniors again in 1972, a year in which she scored 3–1 in the Ann Frazer cup final against St Bernadette’s /Knockshegowna.

== Career ==
She refereed All Ireland Senior Camogie Final in 1997 as well as intermediate, junior and senior club All Ireland finals between 1993 and 1999, she was chair of the Camogie Association’s National Referees Committee and treasurer of the Tipperary Camogie Board from 1988 to 2000.

== Management ==
She became co-selector of the Tipperary county team in 1980 with Timmy Delaney and Bernie O’Dowd, and was team coach through the 1980s and 1990s culminating in the defeat of Clare in the All-Ireland Intermediate final of 1997 and the All Ireland three in a row in 1999–2001.

== Awards ==
She was Sports Executive of the Year at the annual Tipperary Sport Stars (Cidona) awards ceremony in Clonmel.

== Burial ==
She is buried in St Patrick's cemetery, Thurles.
