= Maura McNicholas =

Personal information
- Native name: Máire Uí Niocláis (Irish)
- Born: County Clare, Ireland

Sport
- Sport: Camogie
- Position: half forward
Clubs
- Years: Club
- Celtic & Marino

Maura McNicholas is a former camogie player. Originally from County Clare, her mother, Kitty McNicholas, was on the Clare team that won 1974 All-Ireland Junior Camogie Championship.

Maura McNicholas won Dublin under-12 titles with Celtic and Leinster colleges titles with Colaiste Mhuire. She also won a Leinster minor medal and a "minor player of the year" award.

She won an All-Ireland Junior Camogie Championship title with Clare in 1986. She also won several titles in amateur golf.
