= Catherine O'Loughlin (Clare camogie player) =

Irish camogie player

Catherine O’Loughlin
Personal information
- Native name: Caitríona Ní Lochlainn (Irish)
- Born: Clare, Ireland

Sport
- Sport: Camogie
- Position: Full forward
Club*
Years	Club	Apps (scores)
	Kilnamona	?
Inter-county**
Years	County	Apps (scores)
	Clare	?
Inter-county titles
- All Stars: 2
- * club appearances and scores correct as of (16:31, 30 June 2010 (UTC)). **Inter County team apps and scores correct as of (16:31, 30 June 2010 (UTC)).

Catherine O’Loughlin is a camogie player, winner of an All-Star award in 2005 She helped Clare to two All-Ireland Junior finals in three years only to lose both in replays, to Galway in 2003 and Dublin in 2005. She was nominated for a further All Star award in 2004.
