= Meadhbh Stokes =

Irish camogie player

Personal information
- Native name: Meadhbh Ní Stóc (Irish)
- Born: County Tipperary, Ireland

Sport
- Sport: Camogie
- Position: wing back
Clubs*
Years	Club	Apps (scores)
	Cashel & Clonmel	?
Inter-county**
Years	County	Apps (scores)
	Tipperary	?
- * club appearances and scores correct as of (16:31, 30 June 2010 (UTC)). **Inter County team apps and scores correct as of (16:31, 30 June 2010 (UTC)).

Meadhbh Stokes is a former camogie player, captain of the All Ireland Camogie Championship winning team in 1999, the first at senior level for Tipperary.

== Career ==
She played with Tipperary when they won their breakthrough Intermediate All Ireland title in 1997 and when they eventually won an All Ireland medals in 1999.
