= Lizzie Lyng =

Irish camogie player (born 1983)

Personal information
- Native name: Eílís Ní Longáin (Irish)
- Born: 1983 (age 42–43) Kilkenny, Ireland

Sport
- Sport: Camogie
- Position: Wing back
Club*
| Years | Club | Apps (scores) |
| 1999 – present | Rower–Inistioge | ? |
Inter-county**
| Years | County | Apps (scores) |
| 1998 – present | Kilkenny | ? |
- * club appearances and scores correct as of (16:31, 30 December 2009 (UTC)). **Inter County team apps and scores correct as of (16:31, 30 December 2009 (UTC)).

Lizzie Lyng is a camogie player and a social worker, who played in the 2009 All Ireland camogie final. She featured at midfield on Kilkenny's last final appearance in 2001. Has won Leinster medals in the Under-14, Under-16, Minor and Senior grades as well as one Gael Linn with the province. Captured two Ashbourne Cups with U.C.C. and added a National League medal to her collection in 2008. Her senior debut was in 1999.
