= All-Ireland Junior Camogie Championship =

Camogie championship

All Ireland Junior Camogie Championship
- Irish: Craobh Soisir Camógaíochta na hÉireann
- Founded: 1968; 58 years ago
- Trophy: Kay Mills Cup (formerly New Ireland Cup)
- Title holders: Armagh (3rd title)
- Most titles: Cork, Galway (7 titles)
- Sponsors: Glen Dimplex
- TV partner: RTÉ Sport

The All-Ireland Junior Camogie Championship is a competition for third-tier county teams in the women's field sport of camogie and previously for second-string teams of first-tier counties. In accordance with the practice in GAA competitions the term junior applies to the level of competition rather than the age group.

== Teams ==
In 2026 the following teams participated:

Premier Junior Championship	Position in 2026
Armagh	Champion
Cavan	Runners-up
Kildare	Semi-Finalist
Roscommon	Semi-Finalist
Tyrone	5th
Wicklow	6th

Junior Championship	Position in 2026
Donegal	
Louth	
Mayo	Runners-up
Monaghan	Champion

== History ==
The competition was established in 1969 for the New Ireland Cup. The name was changed to the Kay Mills Cup, in honour of former player Kathleen Mills, in 2010.

In 2006, the second teams of the first-tier camogie counties were removed from the competition. Since 2010 the competition has been officially, though not popularly, known as the Premier Junior Ireland championship. It is the third-tier camogie competition after the O'Duffy Cup for the Senior Championship and the Jack McGrath Cup for the Intermediate Championship. The series of games, organised by the Camogie Association, are played during the summer months with the finals of the three competitions taking place on the second Sunday in September in Croke Park, Dublin.

== Kay Mills Cup Camogie Finals ==
The first figure is the number of goals scored (equal to 3 points each) and the second total is the number of points scored, the figures are combined to determine the winner of a match in Gaelic Games

Year	Date	Winner	Score	Runner-up	Score	Venue	Captain	Referee
1968	Sept 15	Down	2-03	Cork	1-01	Croke Park		Phyllis Breslin (Dublin)
1969	Sept 21	Derry	4-02	Cork	2-04	Croke Park		Anne Ashton (Dublin)
1970	Sept 20	Dublin	4-02	Armagh	3-03	Croke Park		Vera Mannion (Mayo)
1971	Sept 19	Dublin	2-02	Cork	1-02	Croke Park	Patricia Morrissey	Nancy Murray (Antrim
1972	Sept 17	Galway	3-06	Wexford	2-01	Croke Park		Lil O'Grady (Cork)
1973	Sept 16	Cork	4-04	Galway	1-04	Croke Park	Nancy O'Driscoll	Teresa Byrne (Wicklow)
1974	Sept 15	Clare	3-02	Dublin	3-00	Croke Park	Margaret O'Toole	Mary Lynch (Monaghan)
1975	Sept 21	Dublin	5-00	Down	0-03	Croke Park	Brigid Kennedy	Eithne Neville (Limerick)
1976	Sept 19	Down	3-04	Wexford	3-03	Croke Park		Phyllis Breslin (Dublin)
1977	Sept 18	Limerick	2-07	Wexford	3-01	Croke Park	Carrie Clancy	Miriam Higgins (Cork)
1978	Sept 17	Derry	3-04	Cork	1-04	Croke Park	Brigid McLaughlin	Phyllis Breslin (Dublin)
1979	Sept 9	Galway	4-03	Cork	3-02	Croke Park		Carrie Clancy (Limerick)
1980	Sept 14	Cork	4-04	Tyrone	1-04	Croke Park		Kathleen Quinn (Galway)
1981	Sept 13	Clare	3-02	Antrim	0-07	Croke Park	Clare Jones	Belle O'Loughlin (Down)
1982	Sept 26	Louth	1-07	Cork	1-06	Croke Park		Kathleen Quinn (Galway)
1983	Sept 25	Cork	2-05	Dublin	1-03	Croke Park		Bríd Stokes (Limerick)
1984	Sept 9	Cork	5-08	Cavan	2-02	Croke Park		Rita Whyte (Dublin)
1985	Sept 15	Galway	8-07	Armagh	3-07	Croke Park		Síle Wallace (Dublin)
1986	Sept 14	Clare	1–13	Kildare	3-04	Croke Park	Maura McNicholas	Rose Ryan (Dublin)
1987	Sept 27	Kildare	2–10	Armagh	0-07	Croke Park		Kitty McNicholas (Clare)
1988	Sept 25	Galway	3-04	Limerick	1-05	Croke Park		Rose Merriman (Kildare)
1989	Sept 24	Kildare	3–11	Galway	1-03	Croke Park		Áine Derham (Dublin)
1990	Sept 23	Kildare	2–14	Tipperary	3-07	Croke Park		Miriam O'Callaghan (Offaly)
1991	Sept 22	Down	3–13	Tipperary	2–14	Croke Park		Mary Connor (Louth)
1992	Sept 27	Tipperary	6–13	Galway	2-07	Croke Park		Maria Pollard (Waterford)
1993	Sept 26	Armagh	3-09	Galway	3-09	Croke Park		Biddy Phillips (Tipperary)
Replay	Oct 10	Armagh	2–10	Galway	0-06	Croke Park		Biddy Phillips (Tipperary)
1994	Sept 25	Galway	2–10	Limerick	1–11	Croke Park		Catherine McAllister (Antrim)
1995	Sept 24	Limerick	6-05	Roscommon	2-07	Croke Park		Maria Pollard (Waterford)
1996	Sept 22	Cork	4-08	Roscommon	2-07	Croke Park		Fiona McKenna (Antrim
1997	Sept 7	Antrim	7–11	Cork	2–10	Croke Park		Mary Connor (Louth)
1998	Sept 6	Galway	3–11	Tipperary	2–10	Croke Park	Ann Dolan	Catherine McAllister (Antrim)
1999	Sept 5	Cork	1–13	Derry	2-09	Croke Park		John Morrissey (Tipperary)
2000	Sept 3	Derry	3–15	'Cork'	1–13	Croke Park		John Pender (Kildare)
2001	Sept 16	Tipperary	4–16	Offaly	1-07	Croke Park		Aoife Woods (Armagh)
2002	Sept 15	Kilkenny	2–11	Tipperary	2-08	Croke Park		Úna Kearney (Armagh)
2003	Sept 21	Galway	1–12	Clare	2-05	Croke Park		Eamonn Browne (Tipperary)
2004	Sept 19	Cork	4-05	Down	2-04	Croke Park		Aileen Lawlor (Westmeath)
2005	Sept 18	Dublin	1-07	Clare	1-07	Croke Park		Úna Kearney (Armagh)
Replay	Oct 8	Dublin	2-09	Clare	1-04	Birr		Úna Kearney (Armagh)
2006	Aug 19	Dublin	0–12	Derry	1-07	Tullamore		Cathal Egan (Cork)
2007	Sept 9	Derry	3–12	Clare	2–14	Croke Park		Cathal Egan (Cork)
2008	Sept 14	Clare	2-08	Offaly	1–10	Croke Park		Úna Kearney (Armagh)
2009	Sept 13	Offaly	3–14	Waterford	2-08	Croke Park	Marian Crean	Pat Walsh (Armagh)
2010	Sept 12	Antrim	1-09	Waterford	1-09	Croke Park		Donal Leahy (Tipperary)
Replay	Oct 3	Antrim	2–10	Waterford	0–12	Ashbourne	Jane Adams	Killian Looney (Cork)
2011	Sept 11	Waterford	2–11	Down	1–13	Croke Park	Lisa McCrickard	Walter Cole (Cork)
2012		Meath	1–11	Down	1-09	Croke Park		
2013	Sept 15	Kildare	2–11	Laois	1-05	Croke Park	Clodagh Flanagan	D. Ryan (Dublin)
2014	Sept 14	Down	1–12	Laois	1-08	Croke Park		Liz Dempsey (Kilkenny)
2015	Sept 13	Laois	2–12	Roscommon	1-06	Croke Park		G Coulter (Down)
2016	Sep 11	Carlow	4–10	Armagh	2-07	Croke Park	Teresa Meaney	A Larkin (Cork)
2017	Sep 10	Westmeath	1–10	Dublin	1–06	Croke Park		P. McDonald (Cavan)
2018	Sep 9	Dublin	1–12	Kerry	0–06	Croke Park	Emer Keenan	Alan Doheny (Laois)
2019	Sep 8	Kerry	0–11	Limerick	0-08	Croke Park		Gavin Donegan (Dublin)
2020	Dec 5	Armagh	0–19	Cavan	3-07	Breffni Park		Mike Ryan (Tipperary)
2021	Sep 12	Wexford	1–14	Armagh	1–11	Croke Park	Ciara Donohue	Kevin O'Brien (Limerick)
2022	Aug 7	Antrim	5-05	Armagh	0–13	Croke Park		Mike Ryan Tipperary)
2023	August 6	Clare	3-07	Tipperary	1-09	Croke Park	Sinead O'Keeffe & Sinead Hogg	Bernard Heaney (Meath)
2024	August 11	Tipperary	0-12	Laois	1-08	Croke Park		Karol Collins (Galway)
2025	August 10	Laois	2-15	Armagh	0-12	Croke Park		Enda Loughnane (Galway)
2026	August 9	Armagh	0–17	Cavan	0–15	Croke Park	Rachael Trainor	S. Foley (Carlow)

== Wins listed by team ==
Team	Wins	Runner-up	Years won	Years runner-up
Cork	7	8	1973, 1980, 1983, 1984, 1996, 1999, 2004	1968, 1969, 1971, 1978, 1979, 1982, 1997, 2000
Galway	7	4	1972, 1979, 1985, 1988, 1994, 1998, 2003	1973, 1989, 1992, 1993
Dublin	6	3	1970, 1971, 1975, 2005, 2006, 2018	1974, 1983, 2017
Clare	5	3	1974, 1981, 1986, 2008, 2023	2003, 2005, 2007
Down	4	4	1968, 1976, 1991, 2014	1975, 2004, 2011, 2012
Derry	4	2	1969, 1978, 2000, 2007	1999, 2006
Kildare	4	1	1987, 1989, 1990, 2013	1986
Tipperary	3	5	1992, 2001, 2024	1990, 1991, 1998, 2002, 2023
Antrim	3	1	1997, 2010, 2022	1981
Armagh	3	7	1993, 2020, 2026	1970, 1985, 1987, 2016, 2021, 2022, 2025
Limerick	2	3	1977, 1995	1988, 1994, 2019
Laois	2	3	2015, 2025	2013, 2014, 2024
Wexford	1	3	2021	1972, 1976, 1977
Offaly	1	2	2009	2001, 2008
Waterford	1	2	2011	2009, 2010
Louth	1	0	1982	
Kilkenny	1	0	2002	
Meath	1	0	2012	
Carlow	1	0	2016	
Westmeath	1	0	2017	
Kerry	1	1	2019	2018
Roscommon	0	3		1995, 1996, 2015
Cavan	0	3		1984, 2020, 2026
Tyrone	0	1		1980

== Highlights ==
- Down's victory in the inaugural junior championship in 1968. The team was N McKenna, P McGrady, R McCann, E Coulter, N Sands, R Walsh, M Caldwell, B Sands, C Reid, P Crangle, AM Kelly, and E Turley.
- Wexford‘s victory in the 1968 Leinster Junior championship and Smyco Cup before losing to Down in the All Ireland semi-final - the Smyco Cup in Leinster preceded the provincial and Leinster junior championships,
- Derry's victory in the 1969 championship with two goals from J McTeake and further goals from M McTeake and E McGuirk.
- Roscommon's breakthrough in 1970, beating Mayo in the Connacht final and then hosting the All Ireland semi-final against Dublin at Athleague.
- Cork's 1973 victory after losing three finals in the previous three years, Midge Poniard scoring a point that rebounded from a thirty she had taken herself.
- Clare's breakthrough victory in 1974, coming from behind in the final minutes, on a day the referee blew the final whistle five minutes short, the goals from M Davern, M Dolan and M Griffin.
- Down's one point win in 1976, thanks to a great performance and a controversial point by Marion McGarvey, sent over the top crossbar but allowed by the referee.
- Limerick's breakthrough win in 1977, on a day Eileen Kehoe scored all of Wexford's 3–1
- Derry's win in 1978 with two goals from dual player, hockey international Caroline McWilliams and another from Kathleen Marrion from Greenlough.
- Louth's breakthrough victory in 1982, with the winning score from Noreen Maguire, a goal from Mary O’Connor, Ann Currid and Kitty Sharkey.
- Deirdre Costelloe's four goals for Galway in the 1985 final
- Catherine O'Loughlin's emergence as key player for Clare in the 1986 final.
- Kildare's breakthrough victory in 1987, Miriam Malone scoring 1-6 and a second goal coming from Marianne Johnson.
- Galway's 1988 victory with dominant performances from Imelda Hobbins, who scored 2–3, and Ann Coleman who score 1–3
- Kildare's 1990 victory, holding of a great Tipperary rally, key players were Maria Malone who scored 1-5 before Tipperary replied, and Melanie Treacy at full-back.
- Limerick's victory in 1995 with three goals from the diminutive Kay Burke, preventing a breakthrough victory by Roscommon by one point.
- Cork's 1996 win over Roscommon with three goals by Mary Kennefick.
- Galway's 1998 victory over Tipperary by four points, with Lourda Kavanagh scoring 1–9.
- Cork's one point win over Derry in a 1999 thriller, Shauna McCaul having hit the woodwork for Derry and goalkeeper Geraldine Casey saved twice from Cork full forward Mary O’Kane.
- Derry's victory in 2000, in which eleven points were scored by Paula McAtamney and the performance of goalkeeper Aileen Crilly, who denied Amanda Regan several goal chances.
- The 2002 final in which Kilkenny's Aoife Neary burst on the scene with 1–8.
- Catherine O'Loughlin's stunning last-second goal in 2003 to earn a draw for Clare, who had trailed by four points going into injury time.
- Niamh Taylor's injury time pressure-point from a free in 2006 to earn a draw for Dublin.
- Aisling Diamond's goal after seven and a half minutes of injury time to give Derry a one-point victory over Offaly in 2007, after the sides were level seven times.

== Nancy Murray Cup ==
The Junior A championship was introduced under new competition structures in 2006. Its format and whether second-string teams of stronger counties are allowed changed several times. In 2026, it was reestablished as a number of counties returned to or debuted competitive senior camogie.

It is the fourth tier for inter-county teams.

The trophy is named after Nancy Murray who was President of the Camogie Association from 1973 to 1975. A member of the Deirdre club in Belfast, Murray won three All-Ireland senior medals with Antrim, coached her county to All-Ireland success in 1956 and 1967 and refereed four All-Ireland senior finals.

- 2006 Armagh 0-07 Laois 0-01
- 2007 Laois 1-15 Meath 1-09
- 2008 Meath 0-10 Roscommon 1-06
- 2009 Roscommon 2-08 Armagh 3-05
- Replay Roscommon 1-07 Armagh 0-07
- 2010 Kildare 3-10 Armagh 2-08
- 2011 Armagh 1-07 Westmeath 1-07
- Replay Armagh 3-13 Westmeath 3-05
- 2012 Westmeath 1-14 Dublin 2-06
- 2013 Dublin 1-13 Offaly 0-08
- 2014 Limerick 2-08 Carlow 1-06
- 2015 Carlow 0-14 Kerry 0-03
- 2020 Cavan 2-14 Tyrone 1-03
- 2021 Mayo 3-08 Tyrone 1–12
- 2022 Tyrone 3-10 Wicklow 3-09
- 2023 Wicklow 1-15 Mayo 1-05
- 2026 Monaghan 1-14 Mayo 2-10

== Nancy Murray Cup Wins Listed by Teams ==
Team	Wins	Runner-up	Years won	Years runner-up
Armagh	2	2	2006, 2011	2009, 2010
Tyrone	1	2	2022	2020, 2021
Mayo	1	2	2021	2023, 2026
Laois	1	1	2007	2006
Meath	1	1	2008	2007
Roscommon	1	1	2009	2008
Westmeath	1	1	2012	2011
Dublin	1	1	2013	2012
Carlow	1	1	2015	2014
Wicklow	1	1	2023	2022
Kildare	1	0	2010	
Limerick	1	0	2014	
Cavan	1	0	2020	
Monaghan	1	0	2026	
Offaly	0	1		2013
Kerry	0	1		2015

== Máire Ní Chinnéide Cup ==
The Junior B championship was introduced under new competition structures in 2006 for the fifth tier of inter-county teams. The trophy is named for Máire Ní Chinnéide, first president of the Camogie Association and one of the founders of the game in the Craobh a’ Chéitinnigh branch of Conradh na Gaeilge.

- 2006 Westmeath 3–5 Monaghan 1–4
- 2007 Carlow 0–10 Monaghan 1–3
- 2008 Tyrone 4–11 Wicklow 1–3
- 2009 Cavan 0–5 Wicklow 0–4
- 2010 Monaghan 1–7 Cavan 1–7
- Replay Monaghan 0–12 Cavan 1–8
- 2011 Monaghan 1–12 Wicklow 1–7
- 2012 Carlow 1–11 Kerry 1–3
- 2013 Meath 2–4 Kerry 1–5

== See also ==
- All-Ireland Senior Camogie Championship
- Wikipedia List of Camogie players
- National Camogie League
- Camogie All Stars Awards
- Ashbourne Cup
