= All-Ireland Intermediate Camogie Championship =

Camogie championship

All Ireland Intermediate Camogie Championship
- Irish: Craobh Idirmheánach Camógaíochta na hÉireann
- Founded: 1992
- Trophy: Jack McGrath Cup
- Title holders: Antrim (4th title)
- Most titles: Cork (5 titles)
- Sponsors: Glen Dimplex
- TV partner: RTÉ Sport

The All-Ireland Intermediate Camogie Championship is a competition in the women's field sport of camogie for second-tier county teams. Up to 2024 second-string teams of first-tier counties were allowed to participate. The winning team is promoted to the following year's senior championship. Similarly, the winner of the All-Ireland junior championship is promoted to the following year's Intermediate Championship. The grade mirrors Division 2 of the National Camogie League. The final is played in Croke Park, Dublin, alongside the Senior and Junior finals.

== Format ==
The teams are split in two groups with group 1 containing the higher seeded teams. Position 1 and 2 of this group qualify directly for the semi-final while position 3 and 4 face position 1 and 2 from group 2 in a quarter-final. Position 3 and 4 of group 2 face each other in a relegation play-off with the loser being relegated to the All-Ireland junior championship.

In 2026 the following teams participated:

| County | Group | Position in 2026 |
|---|---|---|
| Antrim | 1 | Champion |
| Derry | 1 | Quarter Finalist |
| Down | 1 | Quarter Finalist |
| Kerry | 1 | Semi-Finalist |
| Carlow | 2 | Relegated to Premier Junior |
| Laois | 2 | Runners-up |
| Meath | 2 | Semi-Finalist |
| Westmeath | 2 | Relegation Final |

== History ==
The competition was inaugurated in 1992, with Corn Uí Phuirséil being presented to the winners. It was discontinued in 2005 and replaced by the All-Ireland Senior B Championship in 2006 and 2007 before being revived in 2008. The Jack McGrath cup is currently presented to the winners.

== Jack McGrath Cup Camogie Finals ==
Scoring in Gaelic games: The first numeral in the scoreline of each team is the number of goals scored (equal to three points each) and the second numeral is the number of points scored, the figures are combined to determine the winner of a match in Gaelic games.

| Year | Date | Winner | Score | Runner-up | Score | Venue | Captain | Referee |
|---|---|---|---|---|---|---|---|---|
| 1992 | 11 Oct | Dublin | 4–11 | Down | 4-04 | Ballygalget | Cathy Walsh | Mary Connor (Louth) |
| 1993 | 10 Oct | Clare | 1-08 | Dublin | 1-05 | Ennis | Frances Phelan | Colette Kennedy (Galway) |
| 1994 | 9 Oct | Armagh | 7–11 | Kildare | 3–11 | Tullamore | Mary Black | Miriam O'Callaghan (Offaly) |
| 1995 | 8 Oct | Clare | 1–10 | Tipperary | 1-09 | Toomevara | Denise Cronin | Mary Connor (Louth) |
| 1996 | 13 Oct | Limerick | 2–10 | Down | 1-06 | Limerick | Eileen O'Brien | Marie Pollard (Waterford) |
| 1997 | 12 Oct | Tipperary | 2–19 | Clare | 2–12 | The Ragg | Deirdre Hughes | Aine Dervan (Louth) |
| 1998 | 4 Oct | Down | 1–12 | Cork | 1-08 | Cork | Colleen Hynds | Biddy Phillips (Tipperary) |
| 1999 | 10 Oct | Clare | 1-08 | Antrim | 1-03 | Dunloy | Catherine O'Loughlin | Aine Derham (Dublin) |
| 2000 | 8 Oct | Cork | 3-09 | Limerick | 0–11 | Cork | Sheena Morley | John Morrissey (Tipperary) |
| 2001 | Sept 30 | Antrim | 3–10 | Derry | 0-05 | Dunloy | Ciara Gault | Úna Kearney (Armagh) |
| 2002 | 24 Nov | Cork | 3-06 | Antrim | 1–10 | Ringsend | Hilda Kenneally | Aine Derham (Dublin) |
| 2003 | 5 Oct | Antrim | 2-09 | Tipperary | 0–10 | Navan | Sinead Lagan | Úna Kearney (Armagh) |
| 2004 | 9 Oct | Galway | 1–10 | Tipperary | 0-04 | Thurles | Sinéad Cahalan | Aine Derham (Dublin) |
No competition in 2005, played as All Ireland Senior B Championship 2006-07
| 2006 | 1 Oct | Cork | 2-09 | Galway | 1-07 | Limerick | Miriam Deasy | John Morrissey (Tipperary) |
| 2007 | Sept 29 | Limerick | 1–10 | Cork | 2-07 | Cork | Aoife Sheehan | Ciarán Quigley (Kildare) |
| Replay | 6 Oct | Limerick | 2-09 | Cork | 0-06 | Limerick | Aoife Sheehan | Ciarán Quigley (Kildare) |
| 2008 | 8 Oct | Kilkenny | 5-05 | Cork | 1–14 | Nenagh | Leann Fennelly | Alan Lagrue (Kildare) |
| 2009 | Sept 19 | Galway | 0–15 | Cork | 2-09 | Galway | Caroline Kelly | Alan Lagrue (Kildare) |
| Replay | 10 Oct | Galway | 3–10 | Cork | 1-05 | Nenagh | Caroline Kelly | Karl O'Brien (Dublin) |
| 2010 | Sept 21 | Offaly | 2–12 | Wexford | 2–10 | Croke Park | Michaela Morgan | Owen Elliott (Antrim) |
| 2011 | Sept 11 | Wexford | 2–12 | Antrim | 1-05 | Croke Park | Coleen Atkinson | Alan Lagrue (Kildare) |
| 2012 | Sept 29 | Derry | 2-10 (R) | Galway | 2-09 | Meath | Grainne McGoldrick | Donal Ryan (Dublin) |
| 2013 | Sept 15 | Galway | 0–12 | Limerick | 0–10 | Croke Park | Sinéad Keane | A. O'Brien (Wexford) |
| 2014 | Sept 14 | Limerick | 1–12 | Kilkenny | 0–10 | Croke Park | Fiona Hickey | Ray Kelly (Kildare) |
| 2015 | Sept 13 | Waterford | 2-09 | Kildare | 1-05 | Croke Park | Caithriona McGlone | J. Byrne (Dublin) |
| 2016 | 11 Sep | Kilkenny | 3-06 | Cork | 1–11 | Croke Park | Aine Fahey | J MacDonagh (Galway) |
| 2017 | 10 Sep | Meath | 1–09 | Cork | 1–09 | Croke Park | | |
| Replay | 1 Oct | Meath | 0–10 | Cork | 0-07 | Limerick | | J Dermody (Westmeath) |
| 2018 | 9 Sep | Cork | 1–13 | Down | 0–09 | Croke Park | Sarah Harrington | |
| 2019 | 8 Sep | Westmeath | 1–11 | Galway | 1-09 | Croke Park | | |
| 2020 | 5 Dec | Down | 4–16 | Antrim | 2–10 | Breffni Park | | |
| 2021 | 12 Sep | Antrim | 2-21 | Kilkenny | 2–13 | Croke Park | Lucia McNaughton | Conor Quinlan (Galway) |
| 2022 | 7 Aug | Galway | 0–13 | Cork | 0–11 | Croke Park | Lisa Casserly | Gavin Donegan |
| 2023 | 6 Aug | Derry | 2-05 | Meath | 0–11 | Croke Park | | |
| Replay | 12 Aug | Derry | 1–17 | Meath | 1-09 | Clones | Aoife Ni Chaiside & Aine McAllister | |
| 2024 | 11 Aug | Cork | 1–11 | Kilkenny | 1–10 | Croke Park | Lauren Homan | |
| 2025 | 10 Aug | Offaly | 0–14 | Kerry | 0–11 | Croke Park | | Donnacha O’Callaghan (Limerick) |
| 2026 | 9 Aug | Antrim | 1-28 | Laois | 0-11 | Croke Park | Caitríona Graham | Joe Mullins (Clare) |

== Roll of Honour ==
=== Wins Listed By Team ===
Up to 2024 second string teams of counties in the senior championship were allowed to participate.

| County | Wins | Runner-up | Years won | Years runner-up |
|---|---|---|---|---|
| Cork | 5 | 7 | 2000, 2002, 2006, 2018, 2024 | 1998, 2007, 2008, 2009, 2016, 2017, 2022 |
| Galway | 4 | 3 | 2004, 2009, 2013, 2022 | 2006, 2012, 2019 |
| Antrim | 4 | 4 | 2001, 2003, 2021, 2026 | 1999, 2002, 2011, 2020 |
| Limerick | 3 | 2 | 1995, 2007, 2014 | 2000, 2013 |
| Clare | 3 | 1 | 1993, 1995, 1999 | 1997 |
| Down | 2 | 3 | 1998, 2020 | 1992, 1996, 2018 |
| Kilkenny | 2 | 3 | 2008, 2016 | 2014, 2021, 2024 |
| Derry | 2 | 1 | 2012, 2023 | 2011 |
| Offaly | 2 | 0 | 2010, 2025 | - |
| Tipperary | 1 | 3 | 1997 | 1995, 2003, 2004 |
| Dublin | 1 | 1 | 1992 | 1993 |
| Wexford | 1 | 1 | 2011 | 2010 |
| Meath | 1 | 1 | 2017 | 2023 |
| Armagh | 1 | 0 | 1994 | - |
| Waterford | 1 | 0 | 2015 | - |
| Westmeath | 1 | 0 | 2019 | - |
| Kildare | 0 | 2 | - | 1994, 2015 |
| Kerry | 0 | 1 | - | 2025 |
| Laois | 0 | 1 | - | 2026 |

=== Wins Listed By Province ===
| County | Wins | Runner-up | Total |
|---|---|---|---|
| Munster | 13 | 14 | 27 |
| Ulster | 9 | 8 | 16 |
| Leinster | 8 | 9 | 16 |
| Connacht | 4 | 3 | 7 |

== See also ==
- All-Ireland Senior Camogie Championship
- All-Ireland Junior Camogie Championship
- National Camogie League
- Camogie All Stars Awards
