= Jovita Delaney =

Irish sportsperson

Personal information
- Native name: Siobhán Ní Dhubhshláine (Irish)
- Born: 1974 (age 51–52) County Tipperary, Ireland

Sport
- Sport: Camogie
- Position: Goalkeeper
Club
- Years: Club
- Cashel
Inter-county
- Years: County
- Tipperary
Inter-county titles
- All-Irelands: 5
- All Stars: 2

Jovita Delaney (born 1974) is an Irish sportsperson. She played senior camogie with Tipperary and Cashel Camogie Club, winning All-Star awards in 2005 and 2006, a Lynchpin award, predecessor of the All Star awards, in 2003 and All Ireland medals in 1999, 2000, 2001, 2003 and 2004.

== Early life ==
Jovita Delaney was born in Boherlahan near Cashel, County Tipperary in 1974. She grew up surrounded by an atmosphere of hurling activity. Her father had played with his local club in his youth and was heavily involved in coaching the local juvenile teams. The family’s association with the game stretches back almost one hundred years as Arthur O'Donnell, a cousin, won All-Ireland medals with Tipperary in 1916 and 1925. Delaney frequently attended games with her family, however, it was not until she attended Scoil Mhuire in Cashel that she first became involved in competitive camogie. It was here that she first tasted success, winning both junior and senior Munster titles in 1989 and 1990. Unfortunately an All-Ireland title eluded her.

== Playing career ==
=== Club ===
By attending school in Cashel Delaney became involved with Cashel camogie club. Here she won several under-age titles before breaking onto the senior team in the late 1980s. The club had a great run of success at senior level, with Delaney winning county titles as a member of the forward line in 1989, 1990, 1991. By the late 1990s she had switched to the full-back line where she won a further four county medals between 1998 and 2001. Delaney added a Munster club medal in 2001, however, her side were defeated in the All-Ireland final.

=== Inter-county ===
Delaney began playing with the Tipperary minor team in 1986 at the age of twelve. Four years later she tasted her first major success when she won an All-Ireland medal at minor level. In the game itself against Kilkenny Delaney scored seven points from centre-forward. This win was particularly special as it was Tipperary’s first camogie title at any grade. Two years later in 1992 Delaney had more success when she won an All-Ireland title with the Tipperary junior team. Another All-Ireland medal followed in 1997 when the Tipperary intermediate team won the All-Ireland title following a win over Clare.

She played in eight successive All Ireland finals for Tipperary winning five All Ireland medals in 1999, 2000, 2001, 2003 and 2004. She won her first All Ireland senior club medal with Cashel in 2007 and a second against Athenry in 2009. She was nominated for a further All Star award in 2004.

In 1999 she became goalkeeper on the senior team and would shortly taste major success. That year Tipperary reached their first-ever senior All-Ireland final where they faced Kilkenny. Tipp emerged victorious by a single point and Delaney claimed her first senior All-Ireland medal. In 2000 Delaney was appointed captain of Tipperary’s senior camogie team. Once again her side reached the All-Ireland final but this time the opponents were Cork. Tipp won on the day and Delaney captured her second senior All-Ireland medal. Her performance on the day earned her the RTÉ Player of the Match award. In 2001 Tipperary made it three-in-a-row following a comprehensive defeat of Kilkenny.

The next five years would see Tipperary face Cork in five consecutive All-Ireland finals. Cork won in 2002, however, Delaney’s Tipperary side won back-to-back titles in 2003 and 2004. Cork emerged victorious once again in 2005 and 2006 with back-to-back victories of their own.

Preceded by Meadhbh Stokes (Tipperary)	All-Ireland Camogie Final winning captain 2000	Succeeded by Emily Hayden (Tipperary)
