= Fiona O'Driscoll =

Irish camogie player

Personal information
- Native name: Fiona Ní Drisceoil (Irish)
- Nickname: Pocket rocket.
- Born: Knockadoon, Ballymacoda, Cork, Ireland

Sport
- Sport: Camogie
- Position: Right corner forward
Club*
Years	Club	Apps (scores)
1990–2003	Fr O'Neill's	?
Inter-county**
Years	County	Apps (scores)
1993–2003	Cork	?
- * club appearances and scores correct as of (16:31, 30 June 2010 (UTC)). **Inter County team apps and scores correct as of (16:31, 30 June 2010 (UTC)).

Fiona O'Driscoll is a camogie player, winner of the National Camogie Player of the Year award in 2002 and a Lynchpin award, predecessor of the All Star awards, in 2003 and six All Ireland medals in 1993, 1995, 1997, 1998, 2002 and 2003.

== Career ==
For much of her career she was free-taker and led the Cork attack. In the 2002 final she scored 3–2 against Tipperary. She won eight National League medals including seven-in-a-row between 1995 and 2001 and another in 2003. She scored 2-7 of Cork's 3-7 total in the 2000 final.

== Football ==
She was a member of the All-Stars Football Team in 1995.

== Ashbourne career ==
She played on the University of Limerick team that won Ashbourne Cup titles in 2004 and 2005. She played on three O'Connor Cup UL Football winning teams from 1993 to 1995.

== Coach ==
She coached Cork to successful 2005 and 2006 All Ireland final against Tipperary and in their unsuccessful 2007 All Ireland final against Galway, becoming the first female Coach to all-Ireland camogie winners in over 20 years.

== Administration ==
She was chair of National CCIA (the |Higher Education committee of the Camogie Association) 1995-1998 and Chairperson of the National Camogie Coaching and Development Committee (2006–2008).
