= Ciara Gaynor =

Irish camogie player (born 1979)

Personal information
- Native name: Ciara Nic Fhionnbairr (Irish)
- Born: 1979 (age 46–47) County Tipperary, Ireland

Sport
- Sport: Camogie
- Position: Centre half back
Club
- Years: Club
- Kilruane
Inter-county
- Years: County
- 1997-2005: Tipperary
Inter-county titles
- All-Irelands: 5
- All Stars: 1

Ciara Gaynor is a camogie player, winner of an All-Star award in 2004, a Lynchpin award, predecessor of the All Star awards, in 2003, and five All Ireland medals in 1999, 2000, 2001, 2003 and 2004.

== Family background ==
Ciara's father Len Gaynor was a double All Ireland hurling medalist with Tipperary, manager of the Clare and Tipperary hurling teams and the Tipperary camogie team. She won an All-Ireland schools' medal in 1994 with St Mary's. Nenagh alongside fellow All Star winner Suzanne Kelly.

== Career ==
She played in six successive All Ireland finals for Tipperary winning All Ireland medals in 1999, 2000, 2001, 2002, 2003 and 2004. She won Intermediate All Ireland honours with Tipperary in 1997.
