= Suzanne Kelly =

Irish camogie player

Personal information
- Native name: Siún Ní Cheallaigh (Irish)
- Born: Kilnaboy, County Clare, Ireland

Sport
- Sport: Camogie
- Position: Full back, corner back
Clubs*
Years	Club	Apps (scores)
	Toomevara, Nenagh Éire Óg	?
Inter-county**
Years	County	Apps (scores)
	Tipperary	?
Inter-county titles
- All-Irelands: 5
- All Stars: 2
- * club appearances and scores correct as of (16:31, 30 June 2010 (UTC)). **Inter County team apps and scores correct as of (16:31, 30 June 2010 (UTC)).

Suzanne Kelly is a camogie player, winner of two All-Star awards in 2004 and 2006 and five All Ireland medals in 1999, 2000, 2001, 2003 and 2004. She was nominated for further All Star awards in 2005 and 2007.

== School ==
She won an All-Ireland schools' medal in 1994 with St Mary's, Nenagh alongside fellow All Star winner Ciara Gaynor.

== Career ==
She played in eight successive All Ireland finals for Tipperary winning five All Ireland medals in 1999, 2000, 2001, 2002, 2003 2004. 2005 and 2006. She won an All Ireland Intermediate medal with Tipperary in 1997.
