= Deirdre Hughes =

Personal information
- Native name: Deirdre Níc Aodha (Irish)
- Born: Toomevara, Ireland

Sport
- Sport: Camogie
- Position: Full forward
Club
- Years: Club
- 1990-2005: Toomevara
Inter-county
- Years: County
- 1990-2005: Tipperary
Inter-county titles
- All-Irelands: 5
- All Stars: 2 (1 unofficial)

Deirdre Hughes is a former camogie player selected on the camogie team of the century in 2004, and winner of All Ireland medals in 1999, 2000, 2001, 2003, and 2004.

== Background ==
She came to prominence when Toomevara won the Tipperary County Minor championship three years in a row, and won six successive senior county championships. She was a prominent member of the Tipperary team that won the Junior All Ireland in 1991 and captained the Intermediate team to All Ireland success in 1997. She won eight successive Gael Linn Cup inter-provincial medals with Munster.

== Breakthrough ==
In 1999 when Tipperary made the long-awaited break through and won the O'Duffy Cup she won the RTÉ “Player of the Match”. Among her most dramatic scores as the equalising point against Cork two minutes into injury time of the 2001 All Ireland semi-final in Mullingar. She scored both of Tipperary's goals in that match.

== Awards ==
She won the Jury's/Independent Sports Star of the Week and Munster GAA Council Camogie Player of the Year in 1999, the Jury's/Independent Sports Star Award and "The Star Player of the Match" after the 2001 All Ireland and was selected on first ever All Star Lynchpins Camogie team, a predecessor the official All Stars in 2003 before winning an official All Star award in 2004.

== Citation ==
Her team of the century citation read: "a brilliant individual player she is also the quintessential team player. She is a great playmaker, always ready to give or take a pass and give encouragement to those around her. Quick to turn, she can lose her marker in a second. A prolific scorer, when she moves goal wards she causes havoc. One of the most popular and respected of the modern day stars; she was the only current inter-county player to be chosen on the team."
