= Therese Brophy =

Irish camogie player

Personal information
- Native name: Treasa Ní Bhroithe (Irish)
- Born: County Tipperary, Ireland

Sport
- Sport: Camogie
- Position: Left half back
Club*
Years	Club	Apps (scores)
	Burgess	?
Inter-county**
Years	County	Apps (scores)
1997-2005	Tipperary	?
Inter-county titles
- All Stars: 1
- * club appearances and scores correct as of (16:31, 30 June 2010 (UTC)). **Inter County team apps and scores correct as of (16:31, 30 June 2010 (UTC)).

Therese Brophy is a camogie player from County Tipperary, Ireland. She won an All-Star award in 2004 and a Lynchpin award, predecessor of the All Star awards, in 2003. She was nominated again for an All Star in 2005.

== Career ==
She played in eight successive All Ireland finals for Tipperary GAA, winning five All Ireland medals in 1999, 2000, 2001, 2002, 2003 and 2004. She won her first All Ireland senior club medal with Cashel in 2007 and a second against Athenry in 2009.
