= Eimear McDonnell =

Personal information
- Native name: Eimear Ní Dhomhnaill (Irish)
- Born: County Tipperary, Ireland

Sport
- Sport: Camogie
- Position: Right corner forward
Club*
Years	Club	Apps (scores)
	Duharra	?
Inter-county**
Years	County	Apps (scores)
	Tipperary	?
Inter-county titles
- All-Irelands: 5
- All Stars: 1
- * club appearances and scores correct as of (16:31, 30 June 2010 (UTC)). **Inter County team apps and scores correct as of (16:31, 30 June 2010 (UTC)).

Eimear McDonnell is a camogie player, winner of an All-Star award in 2005, a Lynchpin award, predecessor of the All Star awards, in 2003, a Texaco award in 2003, and five All Ireland medals in 1999, 2000, 2001, 2003 and 2004. She was previously nominated for an All Star award in 2004.

== Family background ==
She is a niece of Cork football manager Billy Morgan. Her sister Deirdre played on the University of Limerick team that won their second Ashbourne Cup in 2004. Her brother Brian is a well-known GAA journalist.

== Career ==
She played in eight successive All Ireland finals for Tipperary. In 2001, she scored 1-2 in Tipperary’s All-Ireland final win and she was selected as the RTÉ Player of the Match. She scored a goal and had another controversially disallowed in 2002 and was player-of-the-match despite finishing on the losing team in 2003. She had a penalty saved in 2004 when she laid off the match-winning goal for Joanne Ryan.
