= Noelle Kennedy =

Personal information
- Born: Toomevara, County Tipperary, Ireland

Sport
- Sport: Camogie
- Position: centre field
Club*
Years	Club	Apps (scores)
	Toomevara	?
Inter-county**
Years	County	Apps (scores)
	Tipperary	?
- * club appearances and scores correct as of (16:31, 30 June 2010 (UTC)). **Inter County team apps and scores correct as of (16:31, 30 June 2010 (UTC)).

Noelle Kennedy is a former camogie player and five-time All-Ireland winner in 1999, 2000, 2001, 2003, and 2004.

== Career ==
Kennedy was largely responsible for Tipperary’s breakthrough to senior status in 1997. She won an All-Ireland in the 1999 All-Ireland Intermediate Final against Clare; Kennedy scored five points in Tipperary's historic victory. She played in seven successive All-Ireland finals for Tipperary in 1999, 2000, 2001, 2002, 2003, 2004, and 2005.

Kennedy continued her work with Tipperary by coaching the U16 side in 2009.

She became manager of the Offaly camogie team in September 2022. She left the post in September 2023.
