= Emily Hayden =

Camogie player

Personal information
- Native name: Eimíle Ní hEideáin (Irish)
- Born: County Tipperary, Ireland

Sport
- Sport: Camogie
Club*
Years	Club	Apps (scores)
	Cashel	?
Inter-county**
Years	County	Apps (scores)
1996-2006	Tipperary	?
- * club appearances and scores correct as of (16:31, 30 June 2010 (UTC)). **Inter County team apps and scores correct as of (16:31, 30 June 2010 (UTC)).

Emily Hayden is a former camogie player, captain of the All Ireland Camogie Championship winning team in 2001.

== Career ==
She played in six successive All Ireland finals for Tipperary winning All Ireland medals in 1999, 2000, 2001, 2002, 2003 and 2004. She won her first All Ireland senior club medal with Cashel in 2007 and a second against Athenry in 2009. She was nominated for an All Star award in 2006.
