= 2011 All-Ireland Minor Camogie Championship =

Camogie championship

Winners
- Champions: Tipperary (1st title)
- Manager: Tim Meaghe

Runners-up
- Runners-up: Kilkenny

The 2011 All-Ireland Minor Camogie Championship is an inter-county competition for age graded development squad county teams in the women's team field sport of camogie was won by Tipperary, who defeated Kilkenny after staging a stunning comeback in the final, played at Semple Stadium Thurles.

== Arrangements ==
In the semi-finals Tipperary defeated Clare at Kilmallock, 3–9 to 1–14, and Kilkenny defeated Galway 3–16 to 3–9 at Nenagh.

== The Final ==
Nicole Walsh's pointed free two minutes from the end of normal time sealed a Tipperary comeback as they overturned a nine-point interval deficit, 2–6 to 1–0, to win the championship at Semple Stadium. Tipperary got off to a brilliant start with a fourth-minute goal by Sarah Fryday but failed to score for the remainder of the half as Kilkenny dominated . Points from Claire Phelan, Orla Hanrick and Aisling Curtis had the teams level by the time Phelan goaled in the 11th minute after Lydia Fitzpatrick split the Tipperary defence open with a blistering run. With Grace Walsh dominant at centre-back and a strong wind in their favour, Miriam Walsh and Curtis added points for Kilkenny and Hanrick scored a goal on the stroke of half time to put Kilkenny in a commanding position at half time, leading by 2–6 to 1–0. Tipperary had already made two changes by that stage and the introduction of Anne Eviston helped reshape the game, as the Drom & Inch player went on to give a performance that earned her the player of the match award. Tipperary started the second half in similar fashion to the first, with Fryday scoring a goal three minutes after the resumption. Brid Quinn landed a point before Michaela Graham reacted quickest when Áine Kinsella batted out a Walsh free to bury the sliotar to the net. When Tara Kennedy scored a point soon after, the margin was down to the minimum entering the final quarter. Fitzpatrick showed good nerve to convert a Kilkenny 45 and a free to stretch the lead to three points once again. Crucially though, Walsh restored parity with a 52nd-minute goal. Kilkenny's Emma Kavanagh and Tipperary's Alice Fogarty exchanged scores before Walsh came up trumps to clinch the title.

== B Division ==
The Minor B final was won by Limerick who defeated Antrim in the final by eight points at De la Salle, Gracedieu. Limerick defeated Wexford in the semi-final at De la Salle, Gracedieu 2–12 to 1–5. Antrim defeated Waterford at Trim by 4–8 to 2–7. The Minor C final was won by Armagh who defeated Meath in the final by one point, 3–5 to 1–10, the decisive score being a goal by Armagh's Eadaoin Murphy.

=== Final stages ===
Final

Tipperary	4-4 – 2-9	Kilkenny

Semple Stadium Thurles

Tipperary	Kilkenny

Tipperary:
GK	1	Orla McEniry
RCB	2	Julie Ann Bourke
FB	3	Sheila Ryan
LCB	4	Louise McLoughlin
RWB	5	Clodagh Quirke
CB	6	Aisling Cremin
LWB	7	Mairéad Barry
MF	8	Bríd Quinn (Capt) 0-1
MF	9	Caoimhe Maher
RWF	10	Andrea Loughnane (Thurles)
CF	11	Ereena Fryday (Clonoulty)
LWF	12	Nicole Walsh 1-1
RCF	13	Sarah Fryday (Clonoulty) 2-0
FF	14	Michaela Graham (Moycarkey) 1-0
LCF	15	Ciara McGrath

Kilkenny:
GK	1	Aine Kinsella (Mullinavat)
RCB	2	Niamh Phelan (Windgap)
FB	3	Jennifer Cunningham (Danesfort)
LCB	4	Laura Norris (Piltown)
RWB	5	Meighan Farrell (Thomastown)
CB	6	Grace Walsh (Tullaroan)
LWB	7	Noelle Maher (Tullaroan)
MF	8	Kate Holland (Lisdowney)
MF	9	Kelly Hamilton (Rower-Inistioge)
RWF	10	Lydia Fitzpatrick (St. Lachtain's) 0-2 (0-1 free)
CF	11	Claire Phelan (Lisdowney) 1-1 (0-1 free)
LWF	12	Miriam Walsh (Tullaroan) 0-2
RCF	13	Aisling Curtis (Clara) 0-2
FF	14	Orla Hanrick (Dicksboro) 1-1
LCF	15	Aoife Murphy (Lisdowney)
Substitutes:
MF		Sarah Anne Quinlan (Gowran) 0-1 (substituted on) 30'

Preceded by 2010 All-Ireland Minor Camogie Championship	All-Ireland Minor Camogie Championship; 2006 – present	Succeeded by 2012 All-Ireland Minor Camogie Championship
