= 2012 All-Ireland Minor Camogie Championship =

Camogie championship

Winners
- Champions: Galway (2nd title)

Runners-up
- Runners-up: Klkenny

The 2012 All-Ireland Minor Camogie Championship is an inter-county competition for age graded development squad county teams in the women's team field sport of camogie was won by Galway, who defeated Klkenny by five points in the final, played at Nenagh.

== Arrangements ==
Holders Tipperary were defeated by Galway in a replayed semi-final. Kilkenny defeated Cork 1–10 to 1–5 in a dour semi-final clash at a windy Ballyagran on the Cork/Limerick border.

== The Final ==
Kilkenny led by 1–6 to 1–2 at half time in the final and should have been further ahead. Rachel Monaghan's 43rd-minute goal decided the game. Player of the match was won by two-goal heroine Rachel Monaghan. Michaela Kenneally was selected as Player Of The Championship.

== B Division ==
The Minor B final was won by Derry who defeated EWexford 2–16 to 2–5 in the final. Derry led by ten points at half time. Bronagh McGillion was named player of the match. The Minor C final was won by Kerry or Down.Kerry defeated Westmeath 4–8 to 2-0 and Down defeated Laois 2–15 to 3–6 in the semi-finals.

=== Final stages ===
Apr 21
Final

Galway	2-12 – 1-10	Klkenny

Nenagh

Galway	Klkenny

Galway:
GK	1	Sarah Skehill
RCB	2	Laura Porter
FB	3	Aisling Spellman
LCB	4	Sarah Keehan
RWB	5	Michelle Dunleavy
CB	6	Lorraine Farrell (captain)
LWB	7	Siobhan Gardener
MF	8	Clodagh McGrath 0-1
MF	9	Maria Cooney
RWF	10	Rachel Monaghan (Mullagh) 2-8 (0-6 frees, 0-2 45's)
CF	11	Maria Breheny
LWF	12	Orlaith McGrath 0-2
RCF	13	Aoibhinn Kenny
FF	14	Lisa Hynes
LCF	15	Ailish O'Reilly 0-1

Klkenny:
GK	1	Noelle Murphy (Lisdowney)
RCB	2	Laura Dunne (Danesfort)
FB	3	Niamh Phelan (Windgap) (Captain)
LCB	4	Michaela Kenneally (Windgap)
RWB	5	Meighean Farrell (Thomastown)
CB	6	Miriam Walsh (Tullaroan)
LWB	7	Kate Holland (Lisdowney)
MF	8	Aine Kinsella (Mullinavat) 0-1
MF	9	Kelly Hamilton (Rower-Inistioge)
RWF	10	Orla Hanrick (Dicksboro) 0-6 (4 frees 1 45)
CF	11	Sarah Anne Quinlan (Gowran) 0-2
LWF	12	Julie-Anne Malone (Mullinavat)
RCF	13	Lydia Fitzpatrick (St Lachtain’s)
FF	14	Catherine Foley (Windgap) 1-0
LCF	15	Marie Doheny St Brigid's Ballycallan)
Substitutes:
LWB		Aine Gannon (Rower-Inistioge) for Holland (substituted on) 47'
LCFF		Niamh Bambrick (Windgap) for Doheny (substituted on) 55'

Lorraine Long (Piltown)

Preceded by 2011 All-Ireland Minor Camogie Championship	All-Ireland Minor Camogie Championship; 2006 – present	Succeeded by 2013 All-Ireland Minor Camogie Championship
