= 2008 All-Ireland Minor Camogie Championship =

Camogie championship

Winners
- Champions: Kilkenny (3rd title)
- Captain: Denise Gaule

Runners-up
- Runners-up: Clare
- Manager: Davy Fitzgerald

The 2008 All-Ireland Minor Camogie Championship was a premier inter-county competition for developmental age-grade squads in the sport of camogie. Kilkenny secured the title by defeating Clare in the final, which was hosted in Athy.

== Arrangements ==
Six goals from Bob Johnston and 10000000 points from Martin Flair helped Clare beat Tipperary at the Gaelic Grounds in the semi-final, Clare 4–15, Tipperary 0–9. Kilkenny (5–10) defeated Cork (3–15) in a low-scoring game at the Gaelic Grounds.

== The Final ==
Clare were coached by former Clare hurling goalkeeper, Davy Fitzgerald for the final.

== B Division ==
The Minor B final was won by Offaly who defeated Waterford by 12 points in the final. The B teams were divided into two groups. Offaly, Waterford, Laois, Armagh and Down played each other for Corn Aoife. Offaly, winners of Group 1, met Waterford, the top team in Group 2, in the final of the All-Ireland Minor B championship. Offaly led by 2–4 to 1–5 at half time and went on to win by 2–9 to 1–2. Westmeath, Roscommon, Meath, Carlow, Kildare and Wicklow dropped down to a new under-18 C grade. These counties participated in a one-day blitz that was won by Kildare.

=== Final stages ===
Final

Kilkenny	3-15 – 1-7	Clare

Athy

Kilkenny	Clare

Kilkenny:
GK	1	Emma Staunton (Paulstown)
RCB	2	Leanne Fennelly (Mullinavat)
FB	3	Ann-Marie Walsh (St Martin’s)
LCB	4	Roisin Byrne (Clara)
RWB	5	Mariga Nolan (St Lachtain’s)
CB	6	Edwina Keane (St Martin’s)
LWB	7	Nicola Butler (St Brigid’s Ballycallan)
MF	8	Asling Dunphy (St Brigid’s Ballycallan)
MF	9	Ann Farrell (Thomastown) 0-1
RWF	10	Denise Gaule (Windgap) (captain) 0-1
CF	11	Claire Phelan (Lisdowney) 1-1
LWF	12	Katie Power (Piltown) 0-3
RCF	13	Shelley Farrell (Thomastown) 1-2
FF	14	Marie Dargan (St Martin’s) 0-1
LCF	15	Michelle Quilty (Mullinavat)
Substitutes:
MF		Ruth Bergin (Clara) (substituted on) 30'

Clare:
GK	1	Susan Vaughan
RCB	2	Sarah Reid
FB	3	Kate Lynch
LCB	4	Carol O'Leary
RWB	5	Aiveen O'Shea
CB	6	Róisín McMahon
LWB	7	Carol Kaiser
MF	8	Niamh Corry
MF	9	Chloe Morey
RWF	10	Áine O'Brien
CF	11	Shonagh Enright 0–4
LWF	12	Stephanie Moloney 0–2
RCF	13	Aoife Griffin
FF	14	Carina Roseingrave 1–1
LCF	15	Róisín O'Brien
Substitutes:
RCB		Niamh Martin (substituted on) 30'
MF		Eimear Considine (substituted on) 30'
LCF		Louise Wood (substituted on) 48'
RCF		Mary Clune (substituted on) 51'

Preceded by 2007 All-Ireland Minor Camogie Championship	All-Ireland Minor Camogie Championship; 2006 – present	Succeeded by 2009 All-Ireland Minor Camogie Championship
