= 2006 All-Ireland Minor Camogie Championship =

Camogie championship

Winners
- Champions: Kilkenny (1st title)

Runners-up
- Runners-up: Galway

The 2006 All-Ireland Minor Camogie Championship is a competition for age graded development squad county teams in the women's team field sport of camogie was won by Kilkenny, who defeated Galway by 11 points in the final, played at Nenagh.

== Arrangements ==
Until 2005 the term minor was applied to the Al-Ireland under-16 camogie championship. W report in 2004 on the state of the game recommended bthat a minor under-18 championship, similar to other Gaelic game be introduced. A cup for the new competition was named for Síghle Nic an Ultaigh. Galway raced into a four-point lead against Cork in the semi-final at Glen Rovers’ grounds as Jessica Gill and Noreen Coen caused problems for the Cork defence and ran out winners by 2–12 to 1–5. Michelle Quilty scored 3–2 as Kilkenny defeated Tipperary in the semi-final at Holycross. Laura Kavanagh scored two goals for Kilkenny.

== The Final ==
Kilkenny made several positional switches for the final against Galway at Nenagh. Sinéad Walsh, Leanne Fennelly and Kate McDonald excelled in defence; Colette Dormer, Anne Dalton and Lucinda Gahan impressed in the middle of the field; and all the forwards scored.

== B Division ==
The Minor B final was won by Down who defeated Antrim by a single point in a dramatic final, 5-8 to 6-4. Down led 2–2 to 1–4 at half time. Derry had three goals in the first four minutes of the second-half, then Antrim rallied and closed the gap to one point with ten minutes remaining. Raquel McCarry and Sara Louise Carr swapped spectacular goals toward the end.

=== Final stages ===
Final

| Kilkenny | 4-10 – 2-5 | Galway |

Nenagh

| Kilkenny | Galway |

Kilkenny:
| GK | 1 | Sinéad Walsh (James Stephens) |
| RCB | 2 | Leanne Fennelly (Mullinavat) |
| FB | 3 | Kate McDonald (Thomastown) |
| LCB | 4 | Sarah Shore (St Martin’s) |
| RWB | 5 | Noren O'Keeffe (St Martin’s) |
| CB | 6 | Collette Dormer (Paulstown) |
| LWB | 7 | Eilish Cantwell (St Martin’s) |
| MF | 8 | Lucinda Gahan (Mullinavat) (captain) 1-0 |
| MF | 9 | Anne Dalton (St Lachtain’s) |
| RWF | 10 | Mary Dalton (St Lachtain’s) 0-2 (0-1 free) |
| CF | 11 | Edwina Keane (St Martin’s) (substituted off) 30' |
| LWF | 12 | Katie Power (Piltown) 0-1 |
| RCF | 13 | Laura Kavanagh (Emeralds) 1-2 (substituted off) 49' |
| FF | 14 | Marie Dargan (St Martin’s) 2-1 |
| LCF | 15 | Michelle Quilty (Mullinavat) 0-1 |
Substitutes:
| MF | | Ann Marie Phelan (Windgap) for Edwina Keane (substituted in) 30' |
| FF | | Sarah O'Mahony (Rower-Inistioge) for Laura Kavanagh (substituted in) 49' |
| RB | | Paula Butler (Mullinavat) |

Galway:
| GK | 1 | Stephanie Gannon |
| RCB | 2 | Emer Haverty |
| FB | 3 | Mary Ward |
| LCB | 4 | Aisling Hobbin |
| RWB | 5 | Sara Noone |
| CB | 6 | Niamh Kilkenny |
| LWB | 7 | Julie Brien |
| MF | 8 | Lorraine Ryan |
| MF | 9 | Paula Kenny |
| RWF | 10 | Jessica Gill 0–1 |
| CF | 11 | Catríona Cormican |
| LWF | 12 | Marian Farragher |
| RCF | 13 | Noreen Coen 0–2 |
| FF | 14 | Martina Conroy 0-1 |
| LCF | 15 | Richelle O'Brien 2–1 |
Substitutes:
| MF | | Gemma Lohan (substituted in) 30' |
| FF | | Michelle Glynn (substituted in) 49' |

| Preceded by First Championship at under-18 | All-Ireland Minor Camogie Championship; 2006 – present | Succeeded by 2007 All-Ireland Minor Camogie Championship |
