= Fearghus mac Rudhraighe Ó Fearghail =

Fearghus mac Rudhraighe Ó Fearghail, was an Irish scribe who lived during the 1550s.

Ó Fearghail was a member of one of the three unrelated septs surnamed Ó Fearghail in medieval Ireland. He identifies himself quite clearly on f. 1v of MS 1467. Other notes by him, or by his father Rudhraidhe, appear at ff. 6v, 7v, 9v, 10v, 12v, 17r, 21v and 25v. He compares his writing with that of the MS's author, Dubhgall Albanach mac mhic Cathail (thought be a member of the MacMhuirich bardic family), and writes a short prayer. Nothing else appears to be known of him.

Notes by another Irishman well known to have travelled in Scotland, Fearghal Óg Mac an Bháird (fl. 1583–1608), appear on ff. 10v (?) and 25v.

== See also ==
- Rev. Fearghus Ó Fearghail
- Seamus Ó Fearghail
- Muirgheas mac Pháidín Ó Maolconaire
- Eoghan Carrach Ó Siadhail
