= Naomi Carroll =

Ireland women's hockey international

Personal information
- Born: 13 September 1992 (age 34) County Clare, Ireland

Sport
- Sport: Field hockey
- Position: Forward
Senior career
Years	Team	Caps	Goals
2012–2015	Catholic Institute	-	-
2015–2016	Hermes	-	-
2016–2018	Cork Harlequins	-	-
2019-	Catholic Institute	-	-
National team
Years	Team	Caps	Goals
2012–	Ireland	118	(25)
Medal record
Women's field hockey
Representing Ireland
FIH Nations Cup
Silver medal – second place	2023–24 Terrassa

Naomi Carroll (born 13 September 1992) is an Irish Olympian and Ireland women's field hockey international. In 2015–16 Carroll won a Women's Irish Hockey League title with Hermes. Carroll has also played both camogie and ladies' Gaelic football at senior inter-county level for Clare and represented the Republic of Ireland women's national under-17 football team.

== Early years and education ==
Carroll is originally from Cratloe, County Clare. She completed her secondary level education at St Patrick's Comprehensive in Shannon. Between 2011 and 2015 she attended Mary Immaculate College where she gained a BA in Maths and Irish. Between 2015 and 2017 she attended NUI Galway where she completed a Masters of Education in Maths and Irish. Since 2016 Carroll has worked as a Maths, Coding and Irish teacher at Gaelcoláiste Luimnigh.

== Association football ==
In addition to playing gaelic games and field hockey, in her youth Carroll also represented the Republic of Ireland women's national football team at schoolgirl level. Her teammates included Deirdre Duke and Dora Gorman. Carroll also played for Mary Immaculate College at intervarsity level.

== Gaelic games ==
Naomi Carroll
Personal information
- Born: 13/09/1992
- Occupation: Teacher

Sport
- Sport: Camogie; Ladies' Gaelic football
- Position: Forward
Clubs
- Years: Club
- 200x–200x 2009 2010– 2011–2015 2011–: Cratloe; Na Piarsaigh; Sixmilebridge → Mary Immaculate College; Banner Ladies
Inter-county
- Years: County
- 2009 2010–: Limerick; Clare

=== Clubs ===
Carroll initially played hurling with boys teams at Cratloe as the club did not have a camogie team. She subsequently played camogie with Na Piarsaigh and Sixmilebridge. She also played club ladies' Gaelic football with Banner Ladies, helping them win the 2013 Munster Ladies Senior Club Football Championship.

=== Intervarsity ===
Carroll played both camogie and ladies' Gaelic football at intervarsity level for Mary Immaculate College. She scored 2–1 as MIC ladies footballers defeated NUI Maynooth in the 2012 Giles Cup final. She also helped the MIC camogie team win both the 2012 Fr Meachair Cup and a league title. In 2015 she helped the MIC camogie team win the Purcell Cup

=== Inter-county ===
Carroll played camogie at minor inter-county level for both Limerick and Clare. In 2009 she was a member of the Limerick team that won the All-Ireland Minor B Camogie Championship. She scored 3–5 in the final against Waterford, including two injury-time goals, as Limerick won the game by a point. She then played for Clare in the 2010 All-Ireland Minor Camogie Championship final. In 2012 Carroll was a member of the Clare team that won the Munster Senior Camogie Championship. She was named player of the match as Clare defeated Cork by 0–9 to 0–7. Carroll has also played senior ladies' Gaelic football for Clare.

== Field hockey ==
=== Catholic Institute ===
Carroll played for Catholic Institute while still a student at St Patrick's Comprehensive. She was a Catholic Institute player when she made her senior debut for Ireland. Carroll helped Catholic Institute win Munster league and championship titles.

=== Hermes ===
In 2015–16, Carroll was a member of the Hermes team that won the Women's Irish Hockey League title and the EY Champions Trophy. Other members of the team included Anna O'Flanagan, Chloe Watkins and Nicola Evans. While playing for Hermes, Carroll also worked at Coláiste Íosagáin as a student teacher.

=== Cork Harlequins ===
In the 2016–17 season Carroll was a member of the Cork Harlequins team that played in the Irish Senior Cup final. Other members of the team included Roisin Upton and Yvonne O'Byrne. In 2017–18 she helped Harlequins finish as runners up in both the Women's Irish Hockey League and the EY Champions Trophy.

=== Ireland international ===
Carroll made her senior debut for Ireland on 24 August 2012 in a 4–0 win over Wales. On 26 August 2012 in her second international, also against Wales, she scored two goals in a 3–1 win. On 17 March 2015 during a 2014–15 Women's FIH Hockey World League Round 2 match against Turkey, Carroll scored four goals in a 13–0 win. She subsequently helped Ireland win the tournament, defeating Canada in the final after a penalty shoot-out. In July 2015 Carroll scored five goals, including one in the final against the Czech Republic, as she helped Ireland win the 2015 Women's EuroHockey Championship II. In January 2017 she was also a member of the Ireland team that won a 2016–17 Women's FIH Hockey World League Round 2 tournament in Kuala Lumpur, defeating Malaysia 3–0 in the final. In February 2018 Carroll made her 100th senior appearance for Ireland against Spain. She was selected as a non-travelling reserve for the 2018 Women's Hockey World Cup.

Tournaments	Place
2013 Women's EuroHockey Nations Championship	7th
2014 Women's Hockey Champions Challenge I	2nd
2014–15 Women's FIH Hockey World League	15th
→ 2015 Dublin Tournament	1st
2015 Women's EuroHockey Championship II	1st
2016 Hawke's Bay Cup	5th
2016–17 Women's FIH Hockey World League	13th
→ 2017 Kuala Lumpur Tournament	1st

== Honours ==
=== Field hockey ===
Ireland

- Women's FIH Hockey World League
  - Winners: 2015 Dublin, 2017 Kuala Lumpur
- Women's EuroHockey Championship II
  - Winners: 2015
- Women's Hockey Champions Challenge I
  - Runners Up: 2014

Cork Harlequins

- Women's Irish Hockey League
  - Runners Up: 2017–18
- Irish Senior Cup
  - Runners Up: 2016–17
- EY Champions Trophy
  - Runners Up: 2018

Hermes

- Women's Irish Hockey League
  - Winners: 2015–16
- EY Champions Trophy
  - Winners: 2015–16

=== Camogie ===
Clare

- Munster Senior Camogie Championship
  - Winners: 2012
- All-Ireland Minor Camogie Championship
  - Runners Up: 2010

Limerick

- All-Ireland Minor B Camogie Championship
  - Winners: 2009

=== Gaelic football ===
Banner Ladies

- Munster Ladies Senior Club Football Championship
  - Winners: 2013
  - Runners Up: 2012
