= 2009 All-Ireland Minor Camogie Championship =

Camogie championship

Winners
- Champions: Kilkenny (4th title)
- Captain: Alison Walsh

Runners-up
- Runners-up: Clare

The 2009 All-Ireland Minor Camogie Championship is a competition for age graded development squad county teams in the women's team field sport of camogie was won by Kilkenny, who defeated Clare by eight points in the final, played at Semple Stadium Thurles. 2009 Kilkenny 5-10 Clare 3-8.

== B Division ==
The Minor B final was won by Limerick who defeated Waterford by one point in a dramatic final at Mallow. Waterford defeated Derry 1–9 to 0–9 at Ashbourne and Limerick defeated Wexford 3–16 to 3–9 in the semi-finals. Naomi Carroll and Chloe Morey scored three points each. The Minor C final was won by Laois. Sarah Ann Fitzgerald scored 2–2 to help Laois defeat Carlow in the final by five points. Laois defeated Roscommon in the minor C semi-final by 8–12 to 1–1 and Carlow defeated Cavan.

== Arrangements ==
Clare defeated Cork 1–9 to 0–11 in the semi-final at Kilmallock, while ’s Denise Gaule scored 3–7 and Aoife Murphy 2–3 as Kilkenny defeated Tipperary by 5–15 to 3–4.

== The Final ==
Five goals before half-time, two of them from Denise Gaule, enabled Kilkenny win the final. They lead 5.05 to 1.04 at the break

=== Final stages ===
Final

Kilkenny	5-10 – 3-8	Clare

Semple Stadium Thurles

Kilkenny	Clare

Kilkenny:
GK	1	Emma Staunton (Paulstown)
RCB	2	Caoimhe Shiel James Stephens
FB	3	Alison Walsh (Windgap) (captain)
LCB	4	Nicola Butler (St Brigid’s Ballycallan)
RWB	5	Niamh Kelly (Dicksboro)
CB	6	Kate McDonald (Thomastown)
LWB	7	Mairéad Power (Carrickshock)
MF	8	Asling Dunphy (St Brigid’s Ballycallan)
MF	9	Niamh Byrne (Clara)
RWF	10	Aine Curran (St. Lachtain’s)
CF	11	Karen Duggan (Piltown)
LWF	12	Anna Farrell (Thomastown) 0-1
RCF	13	Claire Phelan (Lisdowney) 2-4
FF	14	Denise Gaule (Windgap) 2-4
LCF	15	Shelley Farrell (Thomastown) 1-1
Substitutes:
MF		Edel Frisby (Ballyhale Shamrocks) (substituted on) 30'
MF		Davina Tobin (Emeralds) (substituted on) 30'
MF		Ruth Jones (Glenmore) (substituted on) 30'
MF		Mags Fennelly (Ballyhale Shamrocks) (substituted on) 30'

Clare:
GK	1	Ailish Considine (Kilmaley)
RCB	2	Anne Marie McMahon (Crusheen)
FB	3	Chloe Morey 0–2
LCB	4	Carol O'Leary (Newmarket-on-Fergus)
RWB	5	Aiveen O'Shea (Ballyea)
CB	6	Eimear Considine (Kilmaley)
LWB	7	Christina Glynn (Killanena)
MF	8	Róisín McMahon (Newmarket-on-Fergus) 1–0
MF	9	Louise Woods
RWF	10	Orlaith Duggan (Clooney Quin)
CF	11	Niamh Corry
LWF	12	Aisling Hannon (Clooney Quin)
RCF	13	Shonagh Enright (Kilmaley) 1–5
FF	14	Róisín O'Brien 1–1
LCF	15	Katie Cahill (Kilmaley)
	Substitutes:
MF		Carol Kaiser (substituted on) 30'
LWF		Susan Fahy (Whitegate) (substituted on) 40'
FF		Niamh Martin (substituted on) 44'

Preceded by 2008 All-Ireland Minor Camogie Championship	All-Ireland Minor Camogie Championship; 2006 – present	Succeeded by 2010 All-Ireland Minor Camogie Championship
