= Derry GAA =

Gaelic games governing body

- Irish: Cumann Lúthchleas Gael Dhoire
- Nickname(s): The Oak Leaf County
- Province: Ulster
- Dominant sport: Gaelic football
- Ground(s): Celtic Park, Derry; Owenbeg, Dungiven
- County colours: White Red
- Website: derrygaa.ie

County teams
- NFL: Division 1
- NHL: Division 2B
- Football Championship: Sam Maguire Cup
- Hurling Championship: Christy Ring Cup
- Ladies' Gaelic football: Brendan Martin Cup
- Camogie: Jack McGrath Cup

The Derry County Board of the Gaelic Athletic Association (GAA) (Irish: Cumann Lúthchleas Gael Coiste Chontae Dhoire) or Derry GAA is one of the 32 county boards of the GAA in Ireland. It is responsible for Gaelic games in County Londonderry in Northern Ireland (the GAA refers to the county as Derry). The county board is also responsible for the Derry county teams.

Football is the most popular of the county board's Gaelic games. The county football team won an All-Ireland Senior Football Championship (SFC) in 1993; it was the fourth from the province of Ulster to do so, following Cavan, Donegal and Down. The county team has also won seven National League titles and nine Ulster Championship titles.

However, Derry is also regarded as a small dual county.

According to a 2015 TUD study by Shane Mangan, Derry had slightly more than over 9,100 players.

== History ==
Within a year of the GAA's foundation in 1884, GAA clubs were established around the county in Derry, Desertmartin and Magherafelt. However, the administration of Gaelic sports in the county took some time to get properly organised. A Derry county board was established in 1888 and paid affiliation fees to the GAA Central Council. By the following year, although 14 clubs were active, the then GAA President Maurice Davin told the national Congress that the county lacked enough clubs to have its own board. South Derry and North Derry regional boards were established in the 1890s. In the early decades (up to the 1930s), the Derry GAA competitions took in a number of clubs from County Donegal and Tyrone. At various times clubs in South Derry played in the Antrim GAA or Tyrone leagues. The local Catholic Church's opposition to playing games on Sundays hampered growth in the 1890s, but there was something of a revival in the 1900s, especially in hurling. The county also competed sporadically in the Ulster Senior Football Championship (SFC) from 1904. After the disruption caused by political conflict in the 1910s and early '20s, the county board was re-established briefly in 1926, and definitively in 1929, since when it has remained in existence.

=== Structure ===
The GAA in the county is administered by a County Committee (or County Board) with a representative from each GAA club in the County, a Management Committee and a variable number of sub-committees. The county administrative headquarters and centre of excellence are located at Owenbeg, Dungiven.

=== Facilities and management ===
Derry home games are played in the county grounds at Celtic Park, Derry and Owenbeg, Dungiven. Home football games are also sometimes held in Watty Graham Park, Glen or Dean McGlinchey Park, Ballinascreen, which are regarded as secondary stadia. Hurling games are also held at Lavey or Fr McNally Park, Banagher.

The current senior football team manager is Paddy Tally, while John McEvoy is the Derry senior hurling team manager. Mickey Donnelly is in charge of the under-20 football team. The minor football manager (under-17) is Martin Boyle. The management teams for the under-20 and minor hurlers include Ryan O'Neill, Martin Birt and Kevin Kelly.

=== Club scene ===
Derry has 40 affiliated clubs; 32 of which are football, two of which are hurling and six of which are dual. Many Derry GAA followers take a keener interest in the club scene than the inter-county scene, which can adversely affect attendances at Derry senior matches.

== Football ==
=== Clubs ===
Bellaghy have four Ulster Senior Club Football Championships and an All-Ireland Senior Club Football Championship.

Ballinderry Shamrocks have three Ulster Senior Club Football Championships and an All-Ireland Senior Club Football Championship.

Slaughneil have three Ulster Senior Club Football Championships.

The Derry Senior Football Championship is an annual club competition between the top Derry clubs. It is recognised as one of the hardest club championships to get out of successfully in Ireland, as there are a variety of teams like, Ballinderry, Bellaghy, An Lúb, Slaughtneil, Lavey and Dungiven who have previously won Ulster titles, with some winning the All-Ireland title. Attendances at matches are particularly high, with many neutrals from the neighbouring counties of Tyrone, Donegal and Antrim also going to matches, as many view it as the highest standard of club football in Ulster. The winners of the Derry Championship qualify to represent their county in the Ulster Senior Club Football Championship and if they win, go on to the All-Ireland Senior Club Football Championship.

Most football league fixtures are played on Sundays so as to accommodate dual players, who have hurling league fixtures on Wednesdays.

=== County team ===
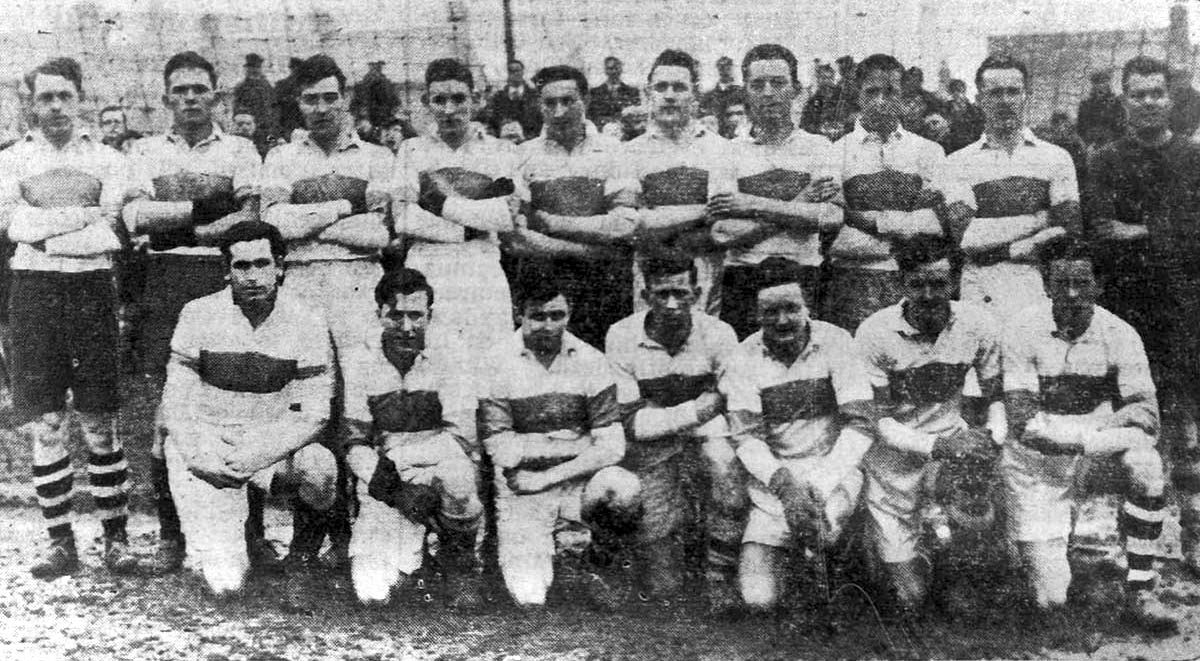
Team of Derry that won the league championship in 1947

The county team won its first Ulster Senior Football Championship (SFC) in 1958. The team advanced to the 1958 All-Ireland Senior Football Championship Final but lost to Dublin.

The county team won its sixth Ulster SFC in 1993 and advanced to the 1993 All-Ireland Senior Football Championship Final. Between appearing in the 1958 and 1993 All-Ireland SFC finals, the county team won four other Ulster SFCs: in 1970, 1975, 1976 and 1987. Since 1993 the county team has won three additional Ulster SFCs, in 1998, 2022, and 2023.

The team won the National Football League in 2000, 2008 and 2024 but was at one point in Division 4.

== Hurling ==
=== Clubs ===
Derry Senior Hurling Championship

Most hurling league fixtures are played on Wednesdays so as to accommodate dual players, who have football league fixtures on Sundays.

=== County team ===
Derry was a hotbed of early hurling activity, with the city's St Patrick's club winning the Ulster Senior Hurling Championship (SHC) in 1902–03; county teams mainly drawn from the city won the 1906 championship by a walkover, and the contested 1909 final. However, soon afterwards football become the dominant sport in the county, and hurling activity declined, especially in the city where association football clubs were active.

It was the 1970s before Derry claimed any more major hurling honours. The county won two Ulster Junior Championship (JHC) titles in 1974 and 1975, as well as the 1975 All-Ireland Junior Championship. The county also won the Ulster Minor Hurling Championship (MHC) twice during the decade in 1973/4? and 1979, before going on to win the next four at the start of the 1980s (1980, 1981, 1982 and 1983); giving the county five consecutive Ulster Minor titles. Derry also won another Ulster Junior (1984) and All-Ireland Junior Championship (1982), with Rory Stevenson still holding a record of his own, as the youngest person ever to play in a Final in Croke Park, that year (1982), playing for Kevin Lynch's Hurling Club Under 14 All-Ireland Féile na nGael winning team.

The 1990s started with Derry claiming back-to-back Ulster MHC titles in 1990 and 1991. The Under 21 side won two more Ulster Under 21 Championships in 1993 and 1997. Derry won the All-Ireland 'B' Senior Hurling Championship in 1996 and the Ulster Intermediate Hurling Championship (IHC) the following year.

In 2000 Derry won its first Ulster SHC in 92 years, and successfully defended it the following year. The county also won the 2001 Ulster MHC. The Seniors won the Nicky Rackard Cup in 2006 and 2017. Derry Under 21s claimed back-to-back Ulster Under 21 titles in 2007 and 2008.

In 2026 Derry won the Christy Ring Cup for the first time after 5 losses in finals between 2015 and 2025.

== Camogie ==
Derry Camogie operates as a sister body of Derry GAA, but along with ladies' football, handball and the GAA county board, the Derry camogie clubs are working towards greater integration among the Gaelic games units in the county.

=== History ===
As early as 1934, there were ten Derry camogie clubs. Under Camogie's National Development Plan 2010–2015, "Our Game, Our Passion", five new camogie clubs were to be established in the county by 2015.

Lavey won the 2009 All Ireland junior club title. Slaughtneil won the All-Ireland Senior Club Camogie Championship three times in a row in 2016-17, 2017–18 and 2018-19. Eoghan Rua won the All-Ireland Intermediate Club Championship in 2010-11 and 2011–12 and the All Ireland junior club title in 2021.

Derry drew with Antrim in the Maguire Cup in 1954, and built on this progress to beat Antrim in that year's Ulster Senior Camogie Championship final by 5–2 to 2–2 - the county's first Ulster Senior Camogie Championship title. They went on to defeat Mayo and London en route to the All-Ireland Senior Camogie Championship final. However they were beaten by an impressive Dublin side, who had not lost a competitive match since 1947, on a scoreline of 10–4 to 4–2. Theresa Halferty, Carrie Rankin, Patsy McCloskey and Pat O'Brien from this team were chosen on the Ulster team for the inaugural Gael Linn Cup inter-provincial series, but the county's appearance in the 1954 All-Ireland decider did little to further the game in Derry. The county won the Ulster championship and contested the All-Ireland Senior Camogie Championship final in 1954. They had previously defeated Antrim in the first round of the 1948 championship, but then surprisingly lost to Down.

Derry reached the final of the All Ireland intermediate championship in 2001, and won the All-Ireland Junior Camogie Championship four times, in 1969, 1978, 2000 and 2007. Derry dominated the new under-16 B championship after its introduction in 2006, winning the finals of 2006, 2007 2008 and 2010 and in 2023 They followed up by winning the Minor B championship in 2010 and 2012.

=== Team honours ===
- Ulster Senior: 8

1954, 1989, 1990, 1999, 2001, 2003, 2004, 2006

- All Ireland junior 4

1969, 1978, 2000 and 2007.

- Ulster Junior: 12

1960, 1967, 1969, 1978, 1986, 1998, 1999, 2000, 2001, 2002, 2006, 2007

- Ulster Minor: 9

1990, 1994, 1995, 1998, 1999, 2000, 2001, 2002, 2003

- All Ireland Under-16 B: 5

2006, 2007, 2008, 2010, 2023

- All Ireland Minor B: 2

2010, 2012

Notes: The above list of honours may be incomplete. Please add any other honours you know of.

==== Individual honours ====
All Star Awards for camogie were first introduced in 2004. Three years later, Ashling Diamond of Bellaghy became the first person to be picked from Derry. Gráinne McGoldrick was picked two years later. In 2010, soaring stars, intended for players not at the senior level, were introduced. It took two years for any Derry person to be picked for this award. Then two people were picked at once. They were Sinead Cassidy and Katy McAneny.

== Ladies' football ==
Derry has a ladies' football team.

== Bibliography ==
Books published about Gaelic games in County Londonderry include Oakboys: Derry's Football Dream Come True by Eoghan Corry.
