= Emer Haverty =

Personal information
- Native name: Eimear Ní Abhartaigh (Irish)
- Born: Galway, Ireland

Sport
- Sport: Camogie
- Position: Midfield
Club*
Years	Club	Apps (scores)
	Killimor	?
Inter-county**
Years	County	Apps (scores)
	Galway	?
- * club appearances and scores correct as of (16:31, 30 June 2011 (UTC)). **Inter County team apps and scores correct as of (16:31, 30 June 2011 (UTC)).

Emer Haverty is a camogie player, a member of the Galway senior panel that unsuccessfully contested the All Ireland finals of 2010 and 2011 against Wexford,

== Other awards ==
All Ireland Club Championship 2011, All Ireland Minor 2004.
