= 2010 All-Ireland Minor Camogie Championship =

Camogie championship

Winners
- Champions: Galway (1st title)
- Manager: Johnny Kane
- Captain: Laura Donnellan

Runners-up
- Runners-up: Clare
- Manager: Chloe Morey

The 2010 All-Ireland Minor Camogie Championship is an inter-county competition for age graded development squad county teams in the women's team field sport of camogie. The championship was won by Galway, who defeated Clare by four points in a replayed final. The drawn match was played at Nenagh and the replay at Semple Stadium.

== Arrangements ==
Three goals and two points from Susan Fahy helped Clare beat Tipperary in the semi-final at Kilmallock. Galway defeated Kilkenny 1–14 to 2–10 as Kilkenny only managed 1–3 from play.

== The Final ==
Rebecca Hennelly took a pass from Shauna Healy and drove it to the Clare net, and then Rebecca Hennelly added a point from a free for Galway’s equalizer in a drawn final at Nenagh. Ailish O'Reilly’s first-half goal helped Galway to a 2 - 12 to 2 - 8 victory over Clare in the replay at Semple Stadium. Clodagh McGrath and the accurate Rebecca Hennelly gave Galway the perfect start, and after O'Reilly’s goal, three unanswered points from Hennelly (free), Aoife Donoghue, and Finola Keely put gave Galway the initiative. Despite a Clare fight-back, Marie Breheny sealed the game for Galway with her 39th-minute goal.

== B Division ==
Goals from Mary Jo McCullagh, Mary Kelly and Gráinne McNicholl secured the Minor B final for Derry who defeated Antrim by ten points in the final at Celtic Park. Derry defeated Offaly 5–17 to 0–5 and Antrim defeated Waterford 2–14 to 2–6 both at Ashbourne in the semi-finals. The Minor C final was won by Carlow who defeated Armagh by ten points in the final. Two goals by Eleanor Treacy gave Carlow a half time lead as an exciting second-half saw 28 scores by 15 different players.

=== Final stages ===
Final

Galway	1-7 – 1-7	Clare

Nenagh

=== Final stages ===
Final

Galway	2-12 – 2-8	Clare

Semple Stadium

Galway	Clare

Galway:
GK	1	Olivia Lane
RCB	2	Tara Kenny
FB	3	Karen Brien
LCB	4	Siobhán Coen
RWB	5	Noreen Murphy
CB	6	Laura Donnellan (captain)
LWB	7	Lorraine Farrell
MF	8	Laura Mitchell
MF	9	Shauna Healy
RWF	10	Rebecca Hennelly 0–6
CF	11	Clodagh McGrath 0–1
LWF	12	Ailish O'Reilly 1–1
RCF	13	Finola Keely 0–1
FF	14	Maria Brehony 1-1
LCF	15	Aoife Donohue
Substitutes:
MF		Rachel O'Halloran (substituted on) 30'
MF		Ailish Considine (Kilmaley) (substituted on) 30'
MF		Laura McMahon (substituted on) 30'

Clare:
GK	1	Suzie O'Shea (Ballyea)
RCB	2	Joanne Walsh
FB	3	Máire McGrath (Sixmilebridge)
LCB	4	Jessica O'Neill
RWB	5	Louise Woods
CB	6	Chloe Morey (Sixmilebridge) (captain) 0–5
LWB	7	Christina Glynn (Killanena)
MF	8	Lisa Loughnane
MF	9	Niamh O'Dea
RWF	10	Regina O'Brien
CF	11	Katie Cahill (Kilmaley)
LWF	12	Niamh Corry
RCF	13	Naomi Carroll (Sixmilebridge) 0–1
FF	14	Susan Fahy (Whitegate) 1–1
LCF	15	Sinéad Tuohy (Sixmilebridge)
MF		Edel Frisby (Ballyhale Shamrocks) (substituted on) 30'
Substitutes:
MF		Anne Eviston (substituted on) 30'
MF		Theresa Ryan (substituted on) 30'
MF		Tara Kennedy 0-1 (substituted on) 30'
MF		Alice Fogarty 0-1 (substituted on) 30'
MF		Mairéad Teehan (substituted on) 30'

Preceded by 2009 All-Ireland Minor Camogie Championship	All-Ireland Minor Camogie Championship; 2006 – present	Succeeded by 2011 All-Ireland Minor Camogie Championship
