= MS 1467 =

Gaelic manuscript

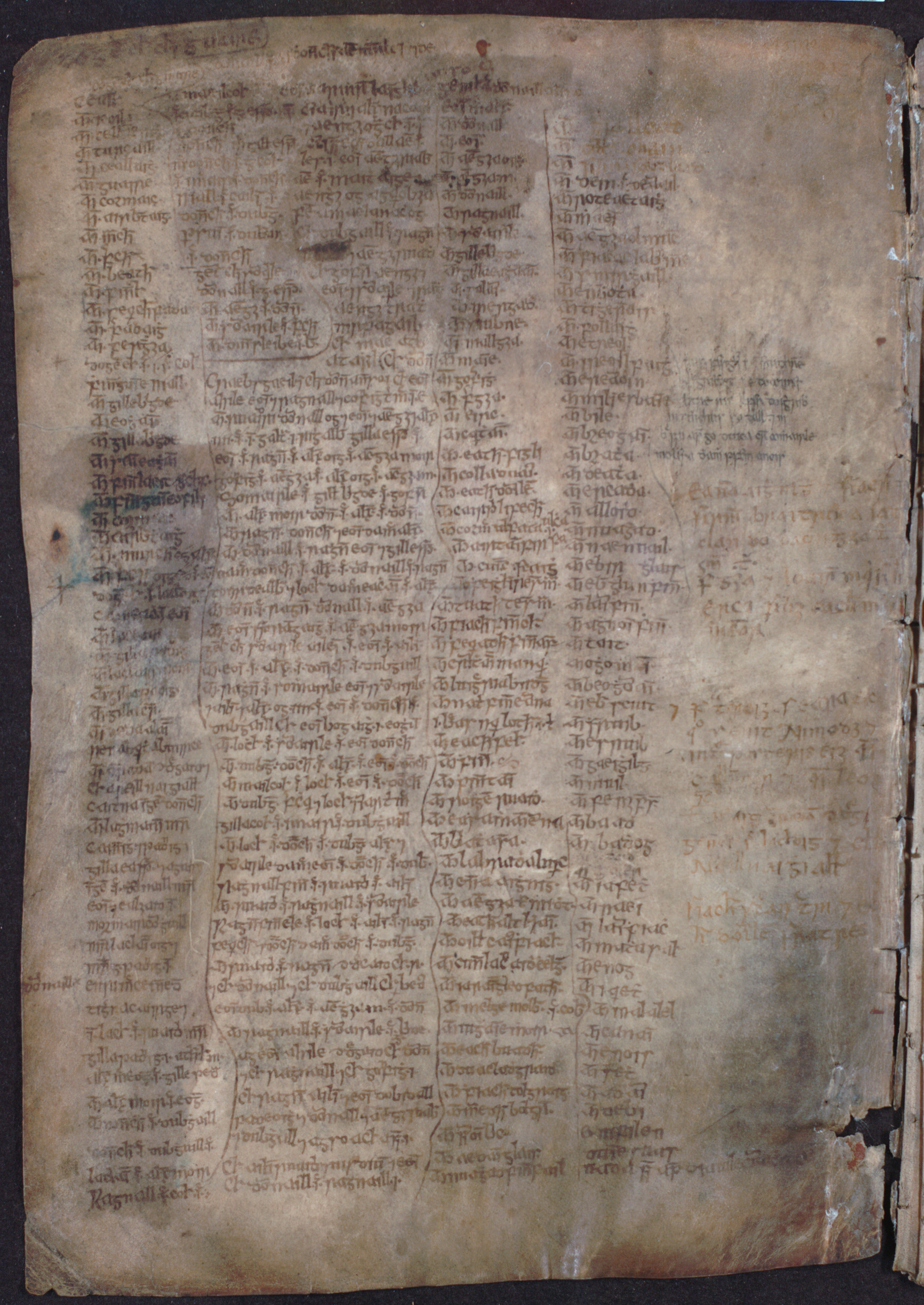
MS 1467, folio 1, verso

MS 1467, earlier known as MS 1450, is a mediaeval Gaelic manuscript which contains numerous pedigrees for many prominent Scottish individuals and clans. Transcriptions of the genealogies within the text were first published in the early 19th century and have ever since been used by writers on the clan histories. The 19th century transcriptions and translations from the manuscript have long been considered inadequate; yet there is no modern, scholarly edition of the manuscript.

== Description of the manuscript ==
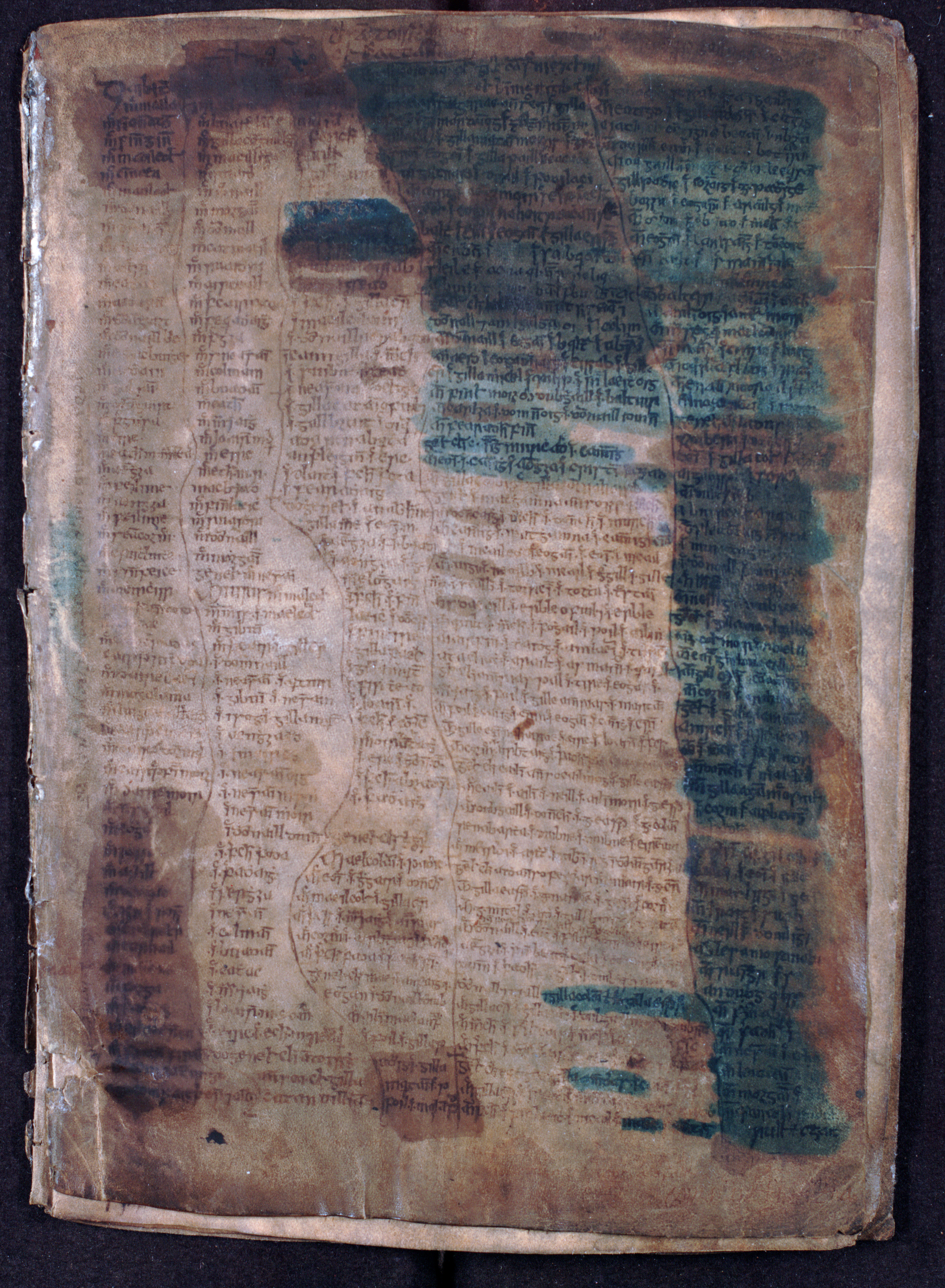
MS 1467, folio 1, recto. Note the stains which are the result of 19th century attempts at rendering the text more legible.

The manuscript known as MS 1467 is a mediaeval Gaelic manuscript held in the National Library of Scotland. The MS 1467 is one of two manuscripts which are bound together in a document known as the MS 72.1.1. The first section of the MS 72.1.1, folios 1–9, is the MS 1467; the second section is known as the Broad Book, and dates to 1425. The MS 1467 is made of vellum and measures 23 by 19 centimetres (9.1 by 7.5 in). It was written by Dubhghall Albanach mac mhic Cathail; according to Ronnie Black, he was likely a member of the MacMhuirich bardic family, and a native of Kintyre. According to Wilson McLeod, Dubhghall Albanach wrote the manuscript at Ballybothy, in County Tipperary, Ireland.

The first folio of MS 1467 contains many pedigrees for prominent individuals and families. Folios 2–9 consist of a sermon ascribed to King Solomon; an account of the deaths of St Philip, St Andrew, St James, Christ and John the Baptist; a part of the Liber Scintillarum, translated from Latin; a poem about how John the Baptist was executed by a Gael; several pious anecdotes; and an account of St Paphnutius. These folios are written much more carefully than the preceding folio which contains the genealogies. Black suggested that this may reflect that Dubhghall Albanach was much more interested in such religious topics than the genealogies.

The quality of the text of the genealogies is very poor; in some places the writing degrades into scratches and scribbling. Other stains and rubbing marks have also deteriorated the manuscript; these are derived from the forming of the front and back covers. In the 19th century, the eminent Scottish historian William Forbes Skene, in an attempt to render portions of the text more legible, added chemicals to the portions of text which were difficult to read. The unfortunate result was that brown, green, and blue stains appear on the manuscript. In some cases these stains improve the legibility of the text, but they also prevent any examination under ultra-violet light.

== History of the manuscript ==
According to Black, the genealogies within the MS 1467 appear to have been copied from an older text, possibly dating from about 1400. Black noted that these pedigrees are untidily put together, which suggests that it was hastily written. The manuscript was obtained by Rev. John Beaton, and subsequently passed into the possession of Rev. David Malcolm of Duddingston, who presented it to the Edinburgh Philosophical Society in 1738. Sometime later the Broad Book was likewise in the possession of the society and the two manuscripts were bound together in 1813.

In 1847, the Iona Club printed a collection of papers, edited by Donald Gregor and Skene, titled Collectanea de Rebus Albanicis. This publication included a paper titled "Genealogies of the Highland Clans, extracted from Ancient Gaelic MSS", which included a transcription and translation of the manuscript, with notes by Skene. The manuscript was titled "Gaelic MS, written circa A.D. 1450". The publication stated that the manuscript had been found by accident the previous year, within the collection of the Faculty of Advocates. At the time of 'discovery', the last leaf was extremely faded and described as being nearly illegible in places. At first, careful examination of the manuscript showed that it must have been written roughly about 1450. Later, after more examination, the specific date of 1467 was found within the manuscript itself. Later in 1880, Skene again had portions of the manuscript printed in an appendix to his multi-volume work Celtic Scotland, under the title "Legendary Descent of the Highland Clans, according to Irish MSS". A second, lightly edited, edition was published ten years later. Within the Celtic Scotland transcription, Skene omitted many words, phrases and even entire genealogies which he could not read, or understand. In Celtic Scotland, Skene made several corrections to his earlier transcriptions. However, he also added text from other sources. In consequence, this hybrid has been confused by many writers to be a literal and verbatim transcription of MS 1467.

From the 19th century to the early 20th century, the manuscript was considered to have been written by a person of the name Maclachlan—as the pedigree of Clanlachlan is much more detailed than other clans and various intermarriages are given within the clan itself. In consequence, it was assumed that the manuscript once formed part of the Kilbride Collection, which was long preserved by the Maclachlans of Kilbride.

There is no modern, scholarly edition of the manuscript.

== 19th century use of the manuscript ==
Skene's misleading "Table of Descent of the Highland Clans" (click to enlarge).

Gaelic scholar Alexander Macbain, one of Skene's greatest critics, stated that Skene relied far too much on the pedigrees within the manuscript; and urged that the pedigrees should be used with caution. Over the years such sentiments have been echoed by others; for example, in the early 20th century, writer George Eyre-Todd stated that Skene had a "fatal propensity for setting up theories on insufficient foundations, and his blind devotion to the MS. of 1467". More recently, David Sellar stated that Skene's transcription of the manuscript was indeed far from perfect. Sellar noted that Skene's "Table of the Descent of the Highland Clans", which appears in Skene's Highlanders, is "exceedingly speculative" and misleading, as it is partially derived from inaccurate transcriptions from the manuscript. Even so, Sellar noted that the conclusions which Skene derived from it had been relied upon for too long.

== List of pedigrees ==
The manuscript contains pedigrees for the following clans and individuals.

Gaelic	English	Notes
Caimbeul	Campbell	The earliest known pedigree which gives the clan a "British" ancestry (from Uther Pendragon, and Arthur)
Camshron	Cameron	
Clann Eóghain na h-Oitrich	Clan Ewen of Otter	Contains an early pedigree.
Clann Ghille Ádhagáin	MacLennan	
Clann Ghille Eadhráin		
Clann Raghnaill etc.	Macdonald of Clanranald etc.	
Clann Shomhairle	Macdougall	
Dáibhidh, rí Alba	David I, King of Scotland	
Iarla Leamhna	Earl of Lennox	The ancestry of Duncan, Earl of Lennox.
Lulach, rí Alba	Lulach, king of Scotland	
Mac an Aba Uaine		
Mac an Tóisigh	Mackintosh, Clan Chattan	
Mac Aoidh Ugadail	MacKay of Ugadale	
Mac Beathadh, rí Alba	Macbeth, king of Scotland	
Mac Cainnigh	Mackenzie	
Mac Dhomhnaill	Macdonald	
Mac Dhubhghaill	Macdougall	
Mac Dhuibhshithe	Macfie	
Mac Eichthighearna	MacEacharn	
Mac Fhinnghuine	Mackinnon	
Mac Gabharáin Earca	MacLennan	
Mac Ghille Anfaigh, faic Camshron		
Mac Ghille Eadhráin		
Mac Ghilleoin	Maclean	
Mac Gille Ainnrias	Gillanders	
Mac Griogair	MacGregor	
Mac Guaire	MacQuarrie	
Mac Labhartaigh ?		
Mac Lachlainn	Maclachlan	
Mac Ladhmainn	Lamont	
Mac Mathghamhna	Matheson	
Mac Mhaoilein	MacMillan	
Mac Neacail	MacNeacail	
Mac Neachtáin	Macnaghten	
Mac Ruaidhrí	MacRuairi	
Mac Shomhairle	MacSorley of Monydrain	

== See also ==
- Fearghus Ó Fearghail (fl. c. 1550)
