= 2007 All-Ireland Minor Camogie Championship =

Camogie championship

Winners
- Champions: Kilkenny (2nd title)

Runners-up
- Runners-up: Cork
- Captain: Deidre Twomey

The 2007 All-Ireland Minor Camogie Championship is a competition for age graded development squad county teams in the women only team field sport of camogie was won by Kilkenny, who defeated Cork by 14 points in the final, played at Clonmel.

== Arrangements ==
Antrim, winners of the minor B championship, defeated Clare in the quarter-finals. Cork's defensive heroes against Tipperary in the semi-final at the Gaelic Grounds were Maria Walsh, Leah Weste and Áine Moynihan. Cork were foiled by the excellent goalkeeping of Kristine Kenneally but progressed by 1–10 to 1–5

== B Division ==
The Minor B final was won by Antrim who defeated Down by nine points in the final at Páirc Esler (Newry), reversing the previous year's result. In the semi-finals Down defeated Roscommon (10–25 to 0–3) and Antrim defeated Waterford (5–27 to 0–2).

== The Final ==
Kilkenny's Marie Dargan and Michelle Quilty scored 3–7 between them in the final.

=== Final stages ===
Final

Kilkenny	3-12 – 0-7	Cork

Clonmel

Kilkenny	Cork

Kilkenny:
GK	1	Emma Staunton (Paulstown)
RCB	2	Mariga Nolan (St Lachtain’s)
FB	3	Ann-Marie Walsh (St Martin's)
LCB	4	Paula Butler (Mullinavat)
RWB	5	Leanne Fennelly (Mullinavat)
CB	6	Collette Dormer (Paulstown)
LWB	7	Kate McDonald (Thomastown)
MF	8	Marie Murphy (Clara)
MF	9	Lucinda Gahan (Mullinavat)
RWF	10	Sinéad Long (Piltown)
CF	11	Katie Power (Piltown)
LWF	12	Catherine Walsh (Thomastown)
RCF	13	Noren O'Keeffe (St Martin's)
FF	14	Marie Dargan (St Martin's)
LCF	15	Michelle Quilty (Mullinavat)
Substitutes:
LCB		Eilish Cantwell (St Martin's) for Butler (substituted on) 30'
FB		Asling Dunphy (St Brigid's Ballycallan) for Walsh (substituted on) 40'
RWF		Noelle Corrigan (St Lachtain’s) for Long (substituted on) 49'
LCF		Georgina Culleton (Piltown) for Quilty (substituted on) 54'
RCB		Roisin Byrne (Clara) for Nolan (substituted on) 57'

Cork:
GK	1	Denise Leahy
RCB	2	Leah West
FB	3	Áine Moynihan
LCB	4	Christina O'Neill
RWB	5	Carol Motherway
CB	6	Marie Walsh
LWB	7	Róisín de Faoite
MF	8	Bríd Twomey
MF	9	Aisling Thompson 0–2
RWF	10	Kathleen O'Brien
CF	11	Niamh Dilworth 0–2
LWF	12	Deidre Twomey 0–2
RCF	13	Erin Corkery
FF	14	Denise Cronin
LCF	15	Sinéad O'Callaghan
Substitutes:
MF		Juanita Brennan
FF		Sharon Whelton
MF		Lydia Cunningham
MF		Siobhán Gleeson (substituted on) 54'

Preceded by 2006 All-Ireland Minor Camogie Championship	All-Ireland Minor Camogie Championship; 2006 – present	Succeeded by 2008 All-Ireland Minor Camogie Championship
