= Tullahought =

Tullahought Tulchacht
- Village
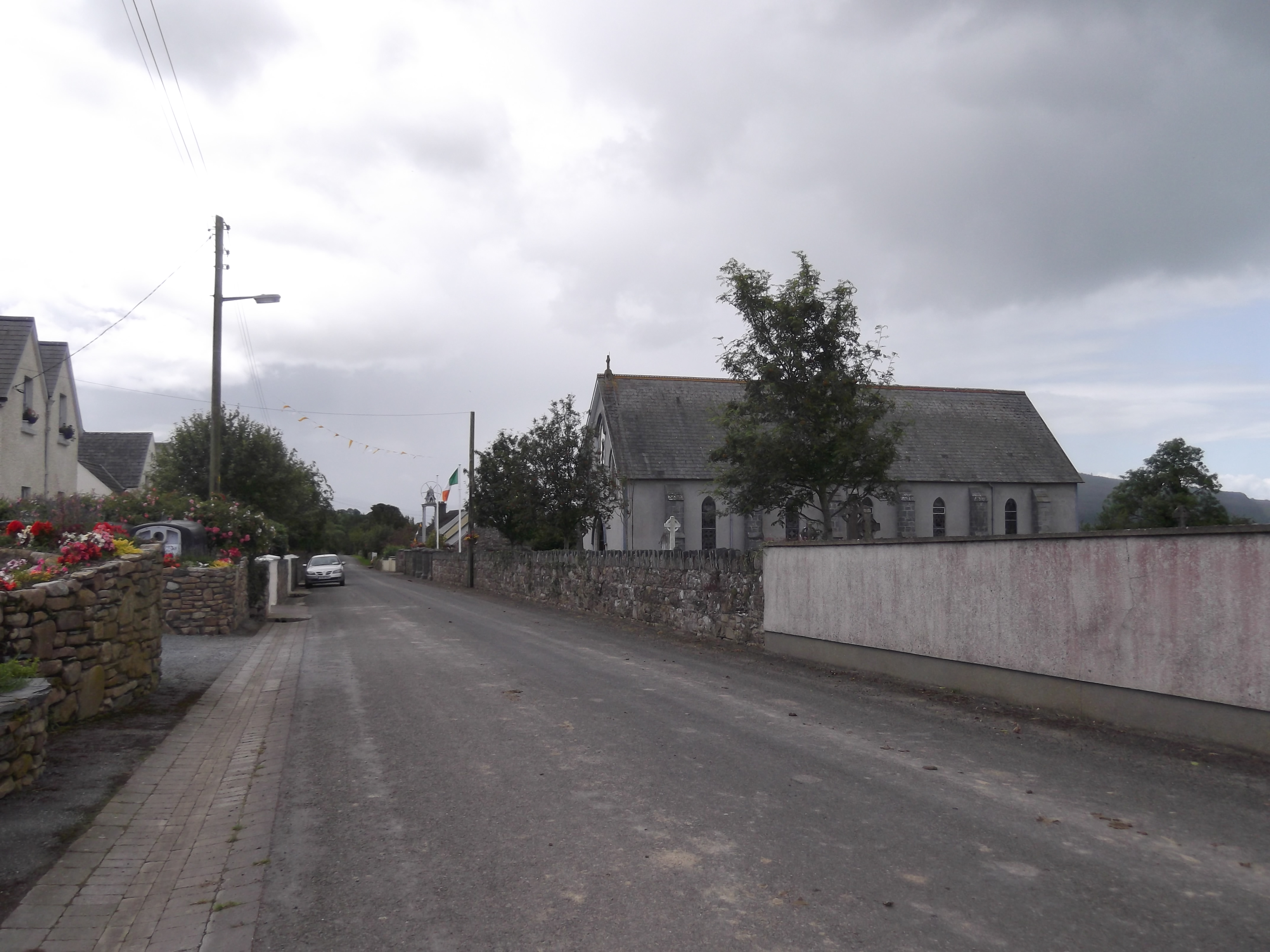
- St. Nicholas' Church

- Location in Ireland
- Coordinates: 52°25′10″N 7°21′51″W
- Country: Ireland
- Province: Leinster
- County: County Kilkenny
- Time zone: UTC+0 (WET)
  - Summer (DST): UTC-1 (IST (WEST))

Tullahought (Irish: Tulchacht) is a small village and townland in south County Kilkenny, Ireland. It is located approximately 8 miles north of Carrick on Suir and 25 miles south of Kilkenny City. The village, located in the local electoral area of Callan, is known for its association with the Ormonde Slate Quarries which is situated at the foot of the Booly Hills, on which Tullahought is situated. The village is in a civil parish of the same name.

== Landmarks ==
St Nicholas' Church

Part of the RC Parish of Windgap, in the Diocese of Ossory, the village's most noted landmark is St Nicholas' church of Kilmacoliver, built in 1885. The church itself underwent major renovation in the mid-1970s, removing access to the upper level, installing a false ceiling and removing both the bell and Rose Window on the altar wall. The rose window, which was moved to a residence in Owning County Kilkenny, was returned to the church in the late 2000s and is now located as a window between the porch of the church and the main building in a new square frame. The bell has, since the renovation, been located at the main door of Windgap national school (the school bearing the same name as the church, St Nicholas').

Community Center

Another local landmark is the old school, now community center, which is located adjacent to the village church. The school, which during its use was divided into boys and girls, was damaged by a fire which destroyed the boys' side in the mid-20th century. The school was restored after the fire, but has since been used as a community center after the schools' amalgamation into Windgap national school.

Stoneage Burial Ground

Pre-historic landmarks of the village include a Stone Age burial ground which is situated on the peak of the Booley hills above the village. The site of the burial ground is reminiscent of a stone circle of which only the weathered remains are now visible. The ground is close to a "Newgrange" like structure called the "Cashal", which like Newgrange is noted for light passing through chambers only during the solstice.

== Ormonde Slate Quarries ==
Located to the south of the village is the Ormonde Slate Quarries. Quarrying in the slate quarries of Tullahought were predominant during the 19th century, with Samuel Lewis's 1837 Topographical Dictionary of Ireland recording that the "extensive quarry of slate of superior quality" employed "about 150 persons". A large community built up around the area which covers land in both Kilkenny and Tipperary. Tullahought shares its association with the quarries with the south Tipperary village of Ahenny, which claims the larger of the 3 lakes created by the quarrying of slate in the area. In the mid-1990s, a yearly festival known as the "Slate Quarries Festival" began with a Summer Mass at the better known and easier accessed of the lakes. The first festival was marked with the creation of artworks made entirely out of slate. Although the festival was reprised over the coming years with numerous sculptures being developed each year, the festival no longer takes place in the same format. An annual mass is still held at the lake during early summer. The most notable building attributed to have the quarries slate is the Palace of Westminster in London (UK House of Parliament).

== Tidy Towns ==
Tullahought has been honored a number of times in the "Tidy Towns" competition. Numerous sculptures including the "Viewing Tower" and lake are among the many additions to the village which contributed to the success in the competition. These were shown on the RTÉ programme Nationwide, in an episode which was broadcast from the village.

== See also ==
- List of towns and villages in Ireland
