= Fearghus Ó Fearghail (priest) =

Irish priest and academic

Fearghus Ó Fearghail (Fergus Farrell) is an Irish priest and academic. Dr. Ó Fearghail holds an M.Sc.(NUI) from Maynooth, studied biblical theology earning an S.T.L. from the Pontifical Gregorian University, Rome, and studied scripture gaining an L.S.S. and D.S.S. from the Pontifical Biblical Institute, Rome. He was ordained a priest in 1974.

Ó Fearghail is a parish priest in Tullahought, Windgap, County Kilkenny in the diocese of Ossory, is a part-time lecturer in Theology in St. Patrick's, Carlow College, and has published articles and books on Irish and biblical matters. Dr Ó Fearghail has lectured in Scripture, in the Mater Dei Institute of Education, Dublin. He also has taught Old and New Testament at the seminary at St. Kierans College, Kilkenny.

He has served as a Diocesan archivist in St. Kieran's College, Kilkenny, and was formerly a curate in Kilmoganny.

== Select bibliography ==
- St Kieran’s College, Kilkenny, Kilkenny, 1982.
- The Introduction to Luke-Acts, Rome, 1991.
- "An Irish Instruction of 1775", in Ossory, Laois and Leinster 3, 2008, pp. 168–189.
- "Tadhg Ó Cianáin in Rome", in Tadhg Ó Cianáin, 2011, pp. 1–33.
- and Pádraig Ó Macháin: Appendix: A nineteenth-century transcript of Ó Cianáin’s manuscript, in Tadhg Ó Cianáin, 2011, pp. 206–214.
- Tadhg Ó Cianáin: an Irish scholar in Rome, editor and contributor, Mater Dei Institute of Education, Dublin, 2011.
- The Bible in Ireland, in Treasures of Irish Christianity, 2012, pp. 185–187.
- Uilliam Ó Domhnaill: Osraíoch as an ngnách, in Sean, nua agus síoraíocht: féilscríbhinn in ómós do Dháithí Ó hÓgáin, eagarthóirí Ríonach Uí Ógáin, William Nolan agus Éamonn Ó hÓgáin, Baile Átha Cliath, Coiscéim, 2012 pp. 498–509.
