= Kilkenny GAA =

County board of the Gaelic Athletic Association in Ireland

- Irish: Cill Chainnigh
- Nickname(s): The Cats; The Stripey Men; The Noresiders; The Black and Amber; The Stripey Women
- Province: Leinster
- Dominant sport: Hurling
- Ground(s): Nowlan Park, Kilkenny
- County colours: Black and amber
- Website: kilkennygaa.ie

County teams
- NFL: N/A
- NHL: Division 1A
- Hurling Championship: Liam MacCarthy Cup
- Ladies' Gaelic football: Brendan Martin Cup
- Camogie: O'Duffy Cup

The Kilkenny County Board of the Gaelic Athletic Association (Kilkenny GAA; Irish: Cumann Lúthchleas Gael Coiste Cill Chainnigh) is one of the 32 county boards of the GAA in Ireland and is responsible for Gaelic games in County Kilkenny. The county board has its head office and main grounds at Nowlan Park and is also responsible for Kilkenny county teams in all codes at all levels. The Kilkenny branch of the Gaelic Athletic Association was founded in 1887.

In hurling, Kilkenny competes annually in the All-Ireland Senior Hurling Championship, which it has won 36 times (a national record), the Leinster Senior Hurling Championship, which it has won 77 times, and the National Hurling League, which it has won 19 times (a national record).

The camogie team has won both the National Camogie League and the All-Ireland Senior Camogie Championship 15 times each.

== Hurling ==
=== Clubs ===
12 club teams annually contest the Kilkenny Senior Hurling Championship. Tullaroan and Ballyhale Shamrocks are the competition's most successful clubs with 20 championship titles apiece, though Shamrocks has a better record in both the Leinster Senior Club Hurling Championship and the All-Ireland Senior Club Hurling Championship. A secondary competition, the Kilkenny Senior Hurling League, takes place annually between the same 12 teams.

A second tier of 12 club teams compete annually in the Kilkenny Intermediate Hurling Championship as well as in the Kilkenny Intermediate Hurling League.

A third tier of 12 club teams compete annually in the Kilkenny Premier Junior Hurling Championship as well as in the Kilkenny Premier Junior Hurling League.

=== County team ===
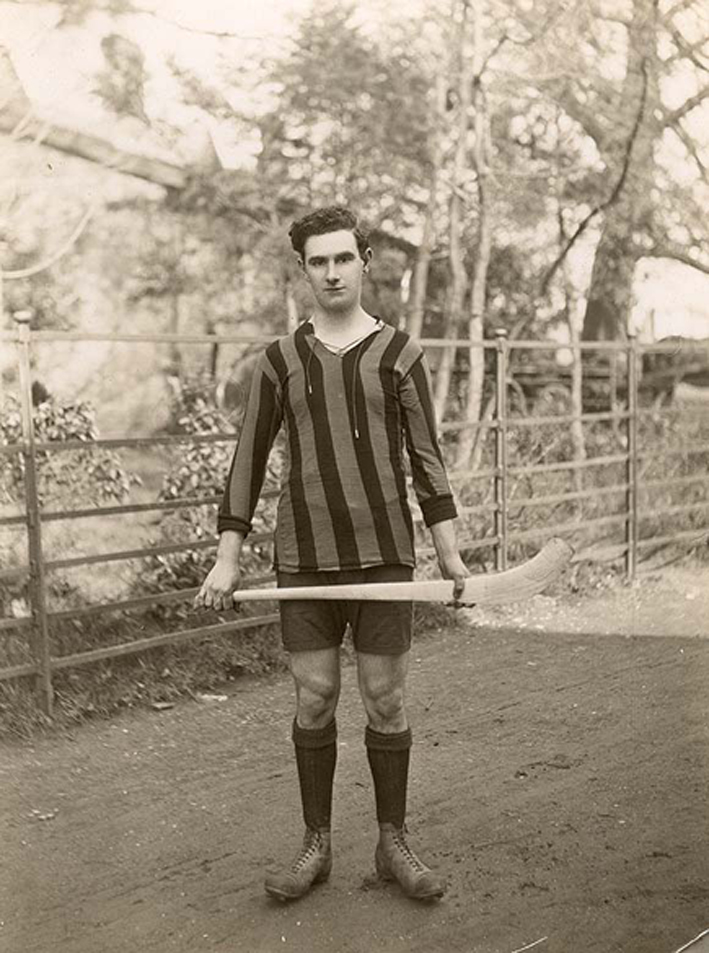
Kilkenny hurler, c. 1923

Kilkenny is the most successful county team at senior level in the history of the game of hurling. Kilkenny has won the All-Ireland Senior Hurling Championship (SHC) 36 times and has won the provincial Leinster Senior Hurling Championship (SHC) on 75 occasions, as of 2023.{

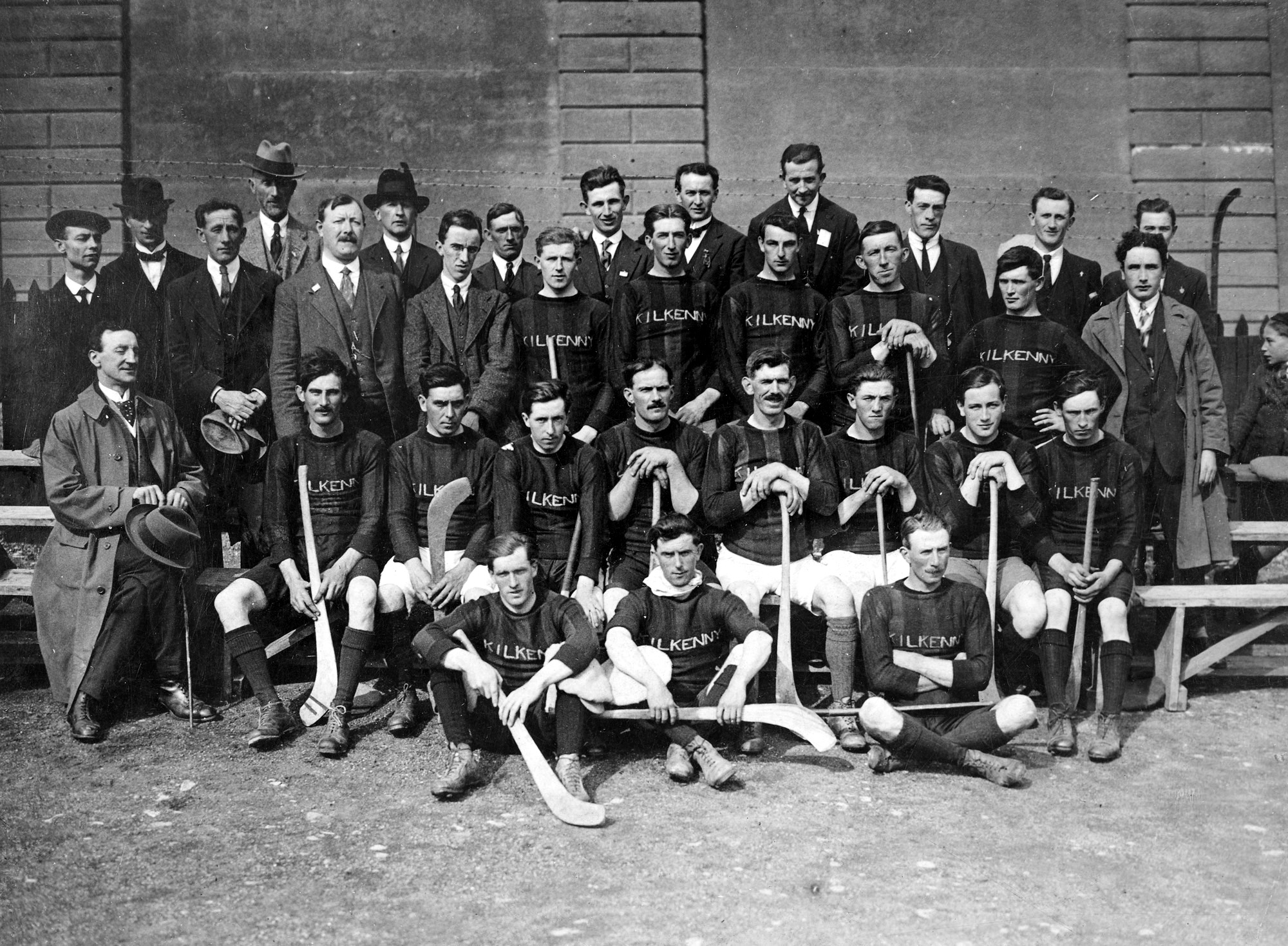
Kilkenny hurling team, c. 1923

Kilkenny defeated Tipperary in the 1922 All-Ireland SHC final. It would be 45 years before Kilkenny would beat Tipperary in the championship again.

Kilkenny met Cork in the 1931 All-Ireland SHC final, which went to a replay noted for Lory Meagher giving one of his most outstanding displays on the hurling field. A second replay was required. Meagher did not play in the third game and Cork won by seven points. Kilkenny qualified for the 1932 All-Ireland SHC final. The opponent was Clare, surprise winner of the Munster Senior Hurling Championship (SHC). Kilkenny won by a goal to claim a first All-Ireland SHC title in a decade. The following year Kilkenny were in a third successive title decider, this time against Limerick, with a Kilkenny victory sealing back-to-back All-Ireland SHC titles.

Kilkenny defeated Limerick in the 1935 All-Ireland SHC final, before losing the 1936 and 1937 All-Ireland SHC finals, to Limerick and Tipperary respectively. Two years later, Kilkenny qualified for the 1939 All-Ireland SHC final. On the day that the Second World War broke out, Kilkenny played Cork at Croke Park. Both sides were level throughout much of the game, the climax of which was played in a fierce thunderstorm. In the dying seconds, Terry Leahy scored the winning point for Kilkenny. Leahy's team went on to lose the 1940 All-Ireland SHC final to Limerick. Kilkenny lost consecutive All-Ireland SHC finals in 1945 (to Tipperary) and 1946 (to Cork). A Cork–Kilkenny rematch took place in the 1947 All-Ireland SHC final, Kilkenny aiming to avoid becoming the first team to lose three consecutive All-Ireland SHC finals. While Kilkenny led for much of the game, Cork scored two late goals that nearly won the match. Terry Leahy again scored the winning point for Kilkenny, to give the county its thirteenth All-Ireland SHC title. Kilkenny lost to Tipperary in the 1950 All-Ireland SHC final. Then, Kilkenny defeated Waterford in the 1957 All-Ireland SHC final, in what was the first championship meeting between the teams. The 1958 All-Ireland SHC final against Waterford ended in a draw, with the replay seeing a young Eddie Keher make his debut, though Waterford won the game. Waterford fought back from an 11-point deficit in the 1963 All-Ireland SHC final, but Kilkenny won by two points. Losses for Kilkenny in the All-Ireland SHC finals of 1964 (to Tipperary) and 1966 (to Cork) followed. The 1967 All-Ireland SHC final, a fourth decider of the decade, saw Kilkenny defeat an ageing Tipperary team. This was Kilkenny's first championship victory against Tipperary since 1923.

Kilkenny defeated Cork in the 1969 All-Ireland SHC final, then won five consecutive Leinster SHC titles between 1971 and 1975. The team also made five consecutive All-Ireland SHC final appearances during those years, a record which stood until 2011. Kilkenny faced Tipperary in the 1971 All-Ireland SHC final, the first decider broadcast in colour by RTÉ. Eddie Keher scored a record 2–11; however, he ended on the losing side. Losses in the All-Ireland SHC finals of 1972 (to Cork) and 1973 (to Limerick) followed. A rematch with Limerick in the 1974 All-Ireland SHC final led to a Kilkenny win. In the 1975 All-Ireland SHC final, Kilkenny met a Galway side that had defeated Cork in the All-Ireland SHC semi-final. Galway led at half-time; the Kilkenny men fought back and secured another 12-point victory. An ageing Kilkenny side was unable to compete in the 1978 All-Ireland SHC final with a Cork team that won its third consecutive title. 1979 saw an injection of new blood into the team, and Kilkenny won a seventh Leinster SHC title of the decade. Kilkenny then met, and defeated, Galway in the 1979 All-Ireland SHC final. Two goals in a 40-second spell by Christy Heffernan gave Kilkenny a victory over Cork in the 1982 All-Ireland SHC final. In 1983, Kilkenny completed what they call 'the double-double', winning back-to-back League, Leinster and All-Ireland SHC honours. Kilkenny once again defeated Cork in the 1983 All-Ireland SHC final. It was also against Cork that Kilkenny's next All-Ireland SHC title came in 1992. Kilkenny retained the Liam MacCarthy Cup in 1993.

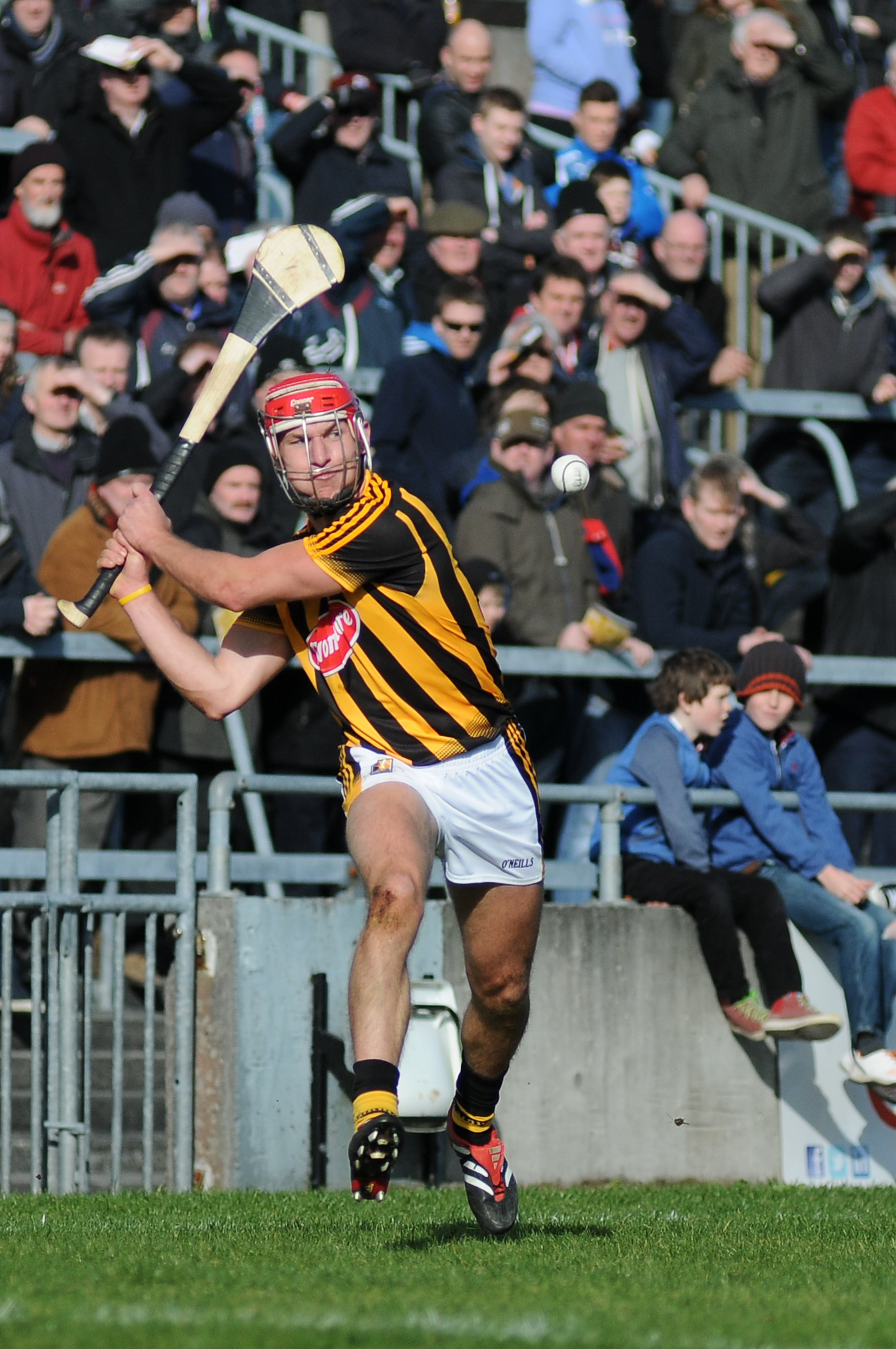
Cillian Buckley in action during a 2015 National Hurling League game against Galway at Pearse Stadium

Brian Cody became manager in 1998. Kilkenny lost an All-Ireland SHC final in 1999, then won another title in 2000, and another in 2002. In 2003, Kilkenny completed what they call 'the double-double', by winning back-to-back League, Leinster and All-Ireland SHC honours. Kilkenny defeated Cork – aiming to win three consecutive titles – in the 2006 All-Ireland SHC final. Kilkenny added two more All-Ireland SHC titles in 2007 (defeating Limerick) and 2008 (defeating Waterford), before completing a four-in-a-row by defeating Tipperary in the 2009 All-Ireland SHC final. Kilkenny became the first team since Cork in the 1940s to complete a four-in-a-row of All-Ireland SHC titles. Lar Corbett scored a hat-trick for Tipperary in the 2010 All-Ireland SHC final, ending Kilkenny's "drive for five" (consecutive All-Ireland SHC titles). Kilkenny added two more All-Ireland SHC titles in 2011 (defeating Tipperary) and 2012 (defeating Galway after a replay). Another victory in the 2014 All-Ireland SHC final meant Brian Cody became the first manager in GAA history to win 10 Senior All-Ireland titles, while Henry Shefflin became the first player in GAA history to win 10 Senior All-Ireland titles. Kilkenny added another All-Ireland SHC title in 2015 (defeating Galway), but lost both the 2019 and 2022 All-Ireland SHC finals (to Tipperary and Limerick respectively). Cody resigned as manager, having been in the role for 24 years.

== Camogie ==
Under Camogie's National Development Plan 2010–2015, "Our Game, Our Passion," five new camogie clubs were to have been established in the county by 2015. Five Kilkenny clubs have won the All-Ireland Senior Club Championship, St Paul's (8), St Lachtain's (3), and Lisdowney (1994). There is one Kilkenny club to so far have won the All-Ireland Intermediate Club Championship, and that is Piltown, and this happened in 2015.

Kilkenny's camogie breakthrough came with the county's first Leinster SCC title in 1972, and, then, the All-Ireland SCC title in 1974. Kilkenny has experienced two different periods of ascendancy in the All-Ireland SCC, winning 15 titles in all, three titles in four years between 1974 and 1977, another title in 1981, seven consecutive titles between 1984 and 1991, and then the title of 1994. There was a gap until 2016 with 2 more titles in 2020 and 2022. Kilkenny has won a National Camogie League four-in-a-row between 1987 and 1990, and had won a total of nine titles by 1993, adding six more titles in 2008, 2014, 2016, 2017, 2018 and 2021. Kilkenny dominated the under-18 minor grade in the four years immediately after it was introduced, winning each one of the championships held between 2006 and 2009.

As of 2025, Kilkenny were threatened with relegation. Peter "Chap" Cleere was the manager, but he resigned after one year with Tommy Shefflin put in his place.

Among the All-Ireland SCC winning captains for Kilkenny were Ann Downey (1989 All-Ireland SCC-winning captain), Ann Downey (1994 All-Ireland SCC-winning captain), Angela Downey (1978 All-Ireland SCC-winning captain), Angela Downey (1988 All-Ireland SCC-winning captain), Angela Downey (1991 All-Ireland SCC-winning captain), Mary Fennelly (1976 All-Ireland SCC-winning captain), Bridie Martin (1985 All-Ireland SCC-winning captain), Bridie Martin (1987 All-Ireland SCC-winning captain), Liz Neary (1981 All-Ireland SCC-winning captain), Liz Neary (1986 All-Ireland SCC-winning captain) and Teresa O'Neill (1974 All-Ireland SCC-winning captain).

Several Kilkenny players, such as Neary Martin and one of the Downeys, were included on the team of the century. Other notable players include Catriona Carey, who is the sister of hurler D. J. Carey, the two Fennellys, Keva, who is the daughter of hurler Ger Fennelly, and Leanne, who is the daughter of hurler Liam Fennelly, Karen Duggan, Ann Dalton, and Ann Carroll, whose father Bill donated the Bill Carroll Cup for various camogie clubs to compete to win.

Mary Fennelly also served as president of the Camogie Association.

Kilkenny has the following achievements in camogie.

- All-Ireland Senior Camogie Championship: 15
  - (click on year for team line-outs) 1974, 1976, 1977, 1981, 1985, 1986, 1987, 1988, 1989, 1990, 1991, 1994, 2016, 2020, 2022
- All-Ireland Intermediate Camogie Championship: 2
  - 2008, 2016
- All-Ireland Junior Camogie Championship: 1
  - 2002
- All-Ireland Minor Camogie Championship: 8
  - 2006, 2007, 2008, 2009, 2013, 2015, 2021, 2025
- All-Ireland Under-16 Camogie Championship: 7
  - 1988, 1989, 1991, 2005, 2006, 2007, 2008
- National Camogie League: 15
  - (click on date for teams) 1978, 1980, 1982, 1985, 1987, 1988, 1989, 1990, 1993, 2008, 2014, 2016, 2017, 2018, 2021
- National Junior Camogie League (Division 2): 1
  - 2006
- Camogie All-Stars: 46
  - 2004 (1), 2006 (1), 2008 (1), 2009 (5), 2010 (1), 2013 (4), 2014 (3), 2016 (8), 2017 (4), 2018 (5), 2019 (4), 2020 (6), 2021 (3), 2022 (7), 2023 (1)

== Football ==
=== Clubs ===
Their local competition is the Kilkenny Senior Football Championship.

=== County team ===
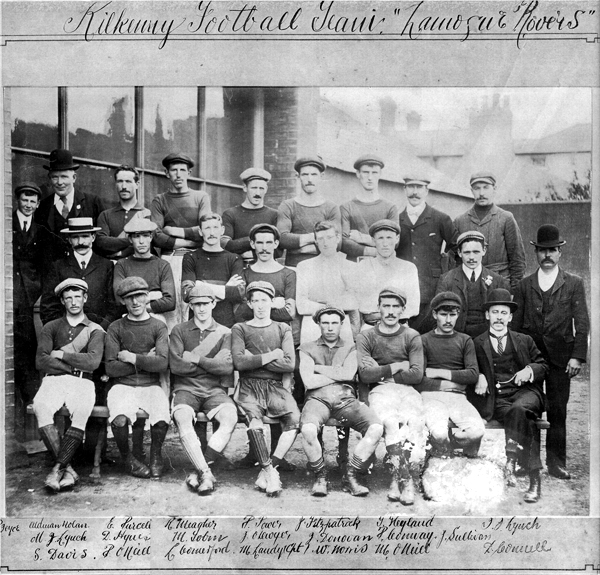
Football team of Kilkenny that reached the Leinster Senior final in 1903

In the GAA's early years, Kilkenny had some success at football. Between 1888 and 1911 Kilkenny contested seven Leinster finals, winning three. They won the first-ever Leinster Senior Football Championship, which was played in 1888, with a victory over Wexford. However, the rest of the championship was abandoned due to the players’ tour of America, known as the US invasion. Further success in Leinster followed in 1900 against Louth 12 points to no score. Kilkenny went on beat Tipperary in the 1900 All-Ireland semi final, 1–7 to 0–8. The game was refixed following an objection by Tipperary, Kilkenny refused to play, so the match was awarded to Tipperary. Tipperary went on to win the All-Ireland final, beating Galway 2–20 to 0–1. The 1911 Leinster final between Kilkenny and Meath was awarded to Meath because Kilkenny were late. Kilkenny objected and won by 2–4 to 1–1 on the field of play. In 1914, the young team mascot, Peter Dunne, had to line out to complete their team. Kilkenny county footballers have not won a senior championship match since 1929, when they defeated Louth by 0–10 to 0–4. Their best championship result since was a 3–8 to 3–4 defeat against Kildare in 1961. 1982 was their last championship campaign. In the league their 1970–71 league campaign yielded four victories and they won three games in a row in early 1988 League and O'Byrne Cup games.

Kilkenny is unique among the 32 Irish county associations in not participating in the All-Ireland Senior Football Championship. They played in the Tommy Murphy Cup, a second-tier competition for weaker footballing counties, for four of the five years it was played. However, even in this competition they lost every game they played. Kilkenny entered the National Football League for the first time in many years in 2008 but did not find any success, losing every game bar one up to, and including, the 2011 competition. The county withdrew from that competition following the 2012 edition. Kilkenny compete in the Leinster Junior Football Championship, their most notable win coming in 2011, when they defeated Wexford 3–5 to 0–13.

There is an underage and adult club football structure in Kilkenny. Glenmore, Mullinavat, Railyard and Muckalee are the football strongholds. However the lure of county and club hurling championships deprives Kilkenny of its best footballers.

In 2015, Kilkenny won the All-Britain Football Championship, defeating Scotland in the final.

=== Honours ===
- Leinster Senior Football Championships: 3
  - 1888, 1900, 1911
- All-Britain Football Championships: 3
  - 2015, 2017, 2018
- All-Ireland Junior Football Championships: 1
  - 2022

== Ladies' football ==
Kilkenny (Muckalee) won the 2025 AIB All Ireland Junior Club Championship in Parnell Park. There, they defeated one of the strongest football counties, County Kerry (Cromane), by 1-13 to 2-9, proving that Kilkenny can make history as both a hurling and a football county.

In 2007, Kilkenny won the All Ireland Ladies' Junior Football Championship, defeating London by 3–5 to 2–5 in Croke Park.
Chairman – John Gorey
Secretary – Trish Dempsey
Treasurer – Richie Windle
PRO – Noelle Curran

Kilkenny has the following achievements in ladies' football.

- All Ireland Ladies' Under-16 Finalists: 1
  - 1975
- All-Ireland Junior Ladies' Football Championship: 1
  - 2007
- All-Ireland Junior Ladies' Club Football Championship: 1
  - 2025
