= All-Ireland Minor Camogie Championship =

Camogie championship

All Ireland Minor Camogie Championship
- Irish: Craobh Mionuir na hÉireann
- Founded: 2006
- Trophy: Sighle Nic an Ultaigh Cup
- Title holders: Kilkenny (8th title)
- Most titles: Kilkenny (8 titles)

The All-Ireland Minor Camogie Championship is a competition for under-18 teams in the women's field sport of camogie. Counties compete for the Síghle Nic an Ultaigh Cup. There are graded competitions at Minor B and Minor C level.

== History ==
The competition was established in 1974 for under-16 teams. In 2006 the age limit was raised from 16 to 18 and a separate under-16 championship established. Championships are also held at Minor B and Minor C level.

== Top winners ==
Click on the year for details and team line-outs from each individual championship.

| # | Team | Wins | Years won | Runner-up | Years runner-up |
|---|---|---|---|---|---|
| 1 | Kilkenny | 9 | 2006, 2007, 2008, 2009, 2013, 2015, 2021, 2025, 2026 | 2 | 2011, 2012 |
| 2 | Cork | 4 | 2018, 2019, 2022, 2023 | 5 | 2007, 2013, 2014, 2021, 2025 |
| 3 | Galway | 3 | 2010, 2012, 2017 | 5 | 2006, 2016, 2018, 2022, 2026 |
| 4 | Tipperary | 3 | 2011, 2016, 2024 | 1 | 2015 |
| 5 | Limerick | 1 | 2014 | 0 | |
| 6 | Clare | 0 | | 5 | 2008, 2009, 2010, 2017, 2019 |
| 7 | Waterford | 0 | | 2 | 2023, 2024 |

== All Ireland Minor Camogie Finals ==
In 2006 the age limit for minor was raised from under-16 to under-18, to bring camogie in line with other Gaelic Games.

The first figure is the number of goals scored (equal to 3 points each) and the second total is the number of points scored, the figures are combined to determine the winner of a match in Gaelic Games

Click on the year for details and team line-outs from each individual championship.

- 2006 Kilkenny 4–10 Galway 2-05
- 2007 Kilkenny 3–12 Cork 0-07
- 2008 Kilkenny 3–15 Clare 1-07
- 2009 Kilkenny 5–10 Clare 3-08
- 2010 Galway 1-07 Clare 1-07
- Replay Galway 2–12 Clare 2-08
- 2011 Tipperary 4-04 Kilkenny 2-09
- 2012 Galway 2–12 Kilkenny 1–10
- 2013 Kilkenny 3–4 Cork 1–10
- Replay Kilkenny 1–12 Cork 0-06
- 2014 Limerick 2–11 Cork 3-08
- Replay Limerick 3–11 Cork 1-09
- 2015 Kilkenny 3-09 Tipperary 1–12
- 2016 Tipperary 2-10 Galway 1-13
- Replay Tipperary 4-09 Galway 2-06
- 2017 Galway 4–14 Clare 0-06
- 2018 Cork 0-18 Galway 1-11
- 2019 Cork 3–15 Clare 2–12
- 2020 Not Played
- 2021 Kilkenny 2–12 Cork 0-12
- 2022 Cork 2–11 Galway 2-07
- 2023 Cork 1-13 Waterford 1-10
- 2024 Tipperary 2-09 Waterford 0-10
- 2025 Kilkenny 3-08 Cork 0-08
- 2026 Kilkenny 3-17 Galway 1-08

== All Ireland Minor B Finals ==
Click on the year for details and team line-outs from each individual championship.

In 2006 the age limit for minor was raised from under-16 to under-18, to bring camogie in line with other Gaelic Games.

- 2006 Down 5-08 Antrim 6-04
- 2007 Antrim 3-18 Down 5-03
- 2008 Offaly 4-13 Waterford 2-07
- 2009 Limerick 3-10 Waterford 1-15
- 2010 Derry 3-10 Antrim 0-09
- 2011 Limerick 4-10 Antrim 2-08
- 2012 Derry 2-16 Wexford 2-05
- 2013 Offaly 6-14 Wexford 1-07
- 2014 Waterford 4-06 Derry 0-02
- 2015 Meath 4-06 Derry 2-10
- 2016 Down 1-06 Roscommon 0-06
- 2017 Antrim 1-11 Kildare 2-05
- 2018 Antrim 3.13 Westmeath 3.12
- 2019 Laois 4-06 Limerick 2-05
- 2020 Not Played
- 2021 Antrim 2-07 Offaly 0-13
- Replay Antrim 3-15 Offaly 3-08
- 2022 Offaly 2-10 Laois 1-12
- 2023 Roscommon 1-14 Laois 1-05
- 2024 Kildare 3-12 Armagh 3-07
- 2025 Armagh 4-14 Down 1-08
- 2026 Wexford 2-13 Waterford 1-09

== All Ireland Minor C Finals ==
- 2009 Laois 3-05 Carlow 2-03
- 2010 Carlow 5-10 Armagh 1-12
- 2011 Armagh 3-05 Meath 1-10
- 2012 Down 1-16 Kerry 0-10
- 2013 Kildare 2-11 Armagh 2-09
- 2014 Meath 1-13 Armagh 0-05
- 2015 Roscommon 2-06 Armagh 0-04
- 2016 Armagh 2-16 Westmeath 1-11
- 2017 Carlow 4-10 Roscommon 0-12
- 2018
- 2019 Tyrone 3-12 Kerry 0-06
- 2020 Not Played
- 2021 Cavan 2-05 Mayo 0-08
- 2022 Wicklow 4-04 Mayo 0-06
- 2023 Kerry 0-12 Down 0-08
- 2024 Tyrone 3-13 Mayo 1-11
- 2025 Wicklow 5-08 Tyrone 1-08
- 2026 Cavan 1-09 Louth 2-04

== All-Ireland Under 16 Championship: Top Winners ==
| # | Team | Wins | Years won |
|---|---|---|---|
| 1 | Cork | 17 | 1975, 1976, 1978, 1979, 1980, 1983, 1984, 1985, 1998, 1999, 2001, 2002, 2003, 2019, 2021, 2022, 2023 |
| 1 | Galway | 17 | 1977, 1981, 1986, 1987, 1994, 1996, 1997, 2000, 2004, 2009, 2010, 2015, 2016, 2017, 2018, 2025, 2026 |
| 3 | Kilkenny | 7 | 1988, 1989, 1991, 2005, 2006, 2007, 2008 |
| 4 | Tipperary | 6 | 1990, 1992, 1993, 2011, 2013, 2014 |
| 5 | Dublin | 2 | 1982, 2012 |
| 6 | Down | 1 | 1974 |
| 6 | Wexford | 1 | 1995 |
| 6 | Limerick | 1 | 2024 |

== All Ireland Under-16 Camogie Finals ==
Until 2006 when the age limit for minor was raised from under-16 to under-18, to bring camogie in line with other Gaelic games, the description "minor" was applied to under-16 camogie competitions from 1974 to 2005 which were played at under-16 level. Hence the under-16 competition from 1974 to 2005 was described as "minor" in contemporary documentation and media.

- 1974 Down 3-00 Cork 0-01
- 1975 Cork 6-02 Galway 0-03
- 1976 Cork 4-06 Down 2-01
- 1977 Galway 5-04 Dublin 2-01
- 1978 Cork 5-01 Dublin 3-04
- 1979 Cork 5-03 Cavan 3-00
- 1980 Cork 5-05 Cavan 0-02
- 1981 Galway 3-04 Antrim 3-03
- 1982 Dublin 5-02 Galway 2-03
- 1983 Cork 3-03 Dublin 2-03
- 1984 Cork 2-12 Galway 5-00
- 1985 Cork 3-08 Galway 2-03
- 1986 Galway 2-08 Wexford 1-04
- 1987 Galway 1-11 Cork 3-03
- 1988 Kilkenny 5-06 Armagh 2-05
- 1989 Kilkenny 9-10 Tipperary 3-08
- 1990 Tipperary 2-11 Kilkenny 3-06
- 1991 Kilkenny 4-12 Galway 3-07
- 1992 Tipperary 4-09 Kilkenny 1-03
- 1993 Tipperary 1-05 Galway 1-05
- Replay Tipperary 3-10 Galway 2-09
- 1994 Galway 7-13 Tipperary 3-09
- 1995 Wexford 2-09 Galway 1-07
- 1996 Galway 3-16 Tipperary 4-11
- 1997 Galway 2-14 Cork 1-06
- 1998 Cork 3-18 Derry 1-05
- 1999 Cork 2-12 Galway 3-08
- 2000 Galway 2-09 Wexford 0-03
- 2001 Cork 6-15 Kilkenny 2-07
- 2002 Cork 2-11 Galway 1-05
- 2003 Cork 3-12 Galway 1-04
- 2004 Galway 3-16 Kilkenny 2-06
- 2005 Kilkenny 4-07 Tipperary 2-07
- 2006 Kilkenny 2-10 Cork 0-04
- 2007 Kilkenny 8-11 Cork 0-06
- 2008 Kilkenny 3-06 Cork 2-04
- 2009 Galway 2-11 Tipperary 2-07
- 2010 Galway 2-11 Tipperary 2-07
- 2011 Tipperary 2-08 Kilkenny 0-13
- 2012 Dublin 4-10 Galway 2-08
- 2013 Tipperary 4-06 Galway 2-08
- 2014 Tipperary 3-13 Galway 1-07
- 2015 Galway beat Cork
- 2016 Galway 3-14 Kilkenny 1-11
- 2017 Galway 2-16 Wexford 2-05
- 2018 Galway 3-14 Cork 1-07
- 2019 Cork 1-14 Galway 2-10
- 2020 Not Played
- 2021 Cork 2-12 Kilkenny 2-10
- 2022 Cork 2-18 Tipperary 0-10
- 2023 Cork 0-11 Galway 1-07
- 2024 Limerick 0-10 Galway 0-09
- 2025 Galway 5-11 Cork 3-08
- 2026 Galway 3-14 Kilkenny 2-17
- Replay Galway 2-11 Kilkenny 1-09

== All Ireland Under-16 B Finals ==
The under-16 B competition from 2000 to 2005 was described as "minor B" in contemporary documentation and media.

- 2000 Laois 9-14 Tyrone 2-01
- 2001 Limerick 3-18 Carlow 1-01
- 2002 Limerick 5-07 Offaly 0-02
- 2003 Waterford 6-11 Armagh 1-04
- 2004 Antrim 1-09 Roscommon 0-03
- 2005 Offaly 2-14 Armagh 3-09
- 2006 Derry 3-03 Armagh 1-02
- 2007 Derry 2-07 Waterford 3-04
- Replay Derry 3-14 Waterford 2-02
- 2008 Derry 6-18 Offaly 0-06
- 2009 Wexford 2-11 Waterford 1-12
- 2010 Derry 3-09 Limerick 1-06
- 2011 Limerick 3-12 Offaly 0-09
- 2012 Offaly 5-10 Derry 2-06
- 2013 Cork 4-08 Waterford 2-10
- 2014 Waterford 6-17 Derry 3-05
- 2015 Waterford 2-08 Dublin 1-07
- 2016 Westmeath 2-13 Laois 0-06
- 2017 Laois 3-06 Antrim 1.10
- 2018 Antrim 3-09 Derry 2-06
- 2019 Waterford
- 2020 Not Played
- 2021 Meath 9-13 Offaly 4-12
- 2022 Laois 4-07 Antrim 3-07
- 2023 Derry 3-18 Kildare 2-06
- 2024 Carlow 4-07 Down 1-10
- 2025 Laois 5-11 Kildare 3-06
- 2026 Kildare 4-11 Westmeath

== All Ireland Under-16 C Finals ==
- 2009 Westmeath 6-09 Tyrone 5-03
- 2010 Carlow 4-08 Meath 1-04
- 2011 Down 1-03 Carlow 1-02
- 2012 Westmeath 1-10 Armagh 2-04
- 2013 Meath 1-10 Laois 2-03
- 2014 Laois
- 2015 Westmeath
- 2016 Kildare 1-11 Carlow 1-08
- 2017 Armagh 2-09 Carlow 2-08
- 2018 Carlow
- 2019 Roscommon
- 2020 Not Played
- 2021 Westmeath 1-01 Roscommon 0-03
- 2022
- 2023 Tyrone 2-15 Cavan 2-08
- 2024 Cavan 5-05 Wicklow 2-12
- 2025 Wicklow 2-08 Cavan 0- 04
- 2026 Tyrone 1-08 Cavan 1-05

== All Ireland Under-16 D Finals ==
- 2021 Wicklow 3-11 Mayo 0-02
- 2022 Mayo 4 -12 Cavan 1- 03

== See also ==
- All-Ireland Senior Camogie Championship
- All-Ireland Junior Camogie Championship
- All-Ireland Intermediate Camogie Championship
- Wikipedia List of Camogie players
- National Camogie League
- Camogie All Stars Awards
- Ashbourne Cup
