= Carol O'Leary =

Irish camogie player

Carol O'Leary is a camogie player with the Clare Senior Camogie team.

O'Leary plays at left corner back and won a Munster A championship title in 2012 and was an All Star nominee in 2013 and 2014. O'Leary first played with Clare at primary game level and represented Clare at every level, joining the Senior panel in 2009. O'Leary has played at the Gael Linn inter-pro camogie with Munster. She also plays with the Clare senior football team.

Her club is Newmarket on Fergus with whom she plays camogie and football. In 2015 Newmarket won the county senior Camogie league and championship with O'Leary receiving player of the game in both finals. O'Leary has won six senior county camogie championships and nine league titles, she has also won camogie titles at all under-age grades. O'Leary is the current captain of her club football team and has been for the previous five years, leading them to take Junior A, Junior B, Intermediate and two Senior B Clare titles. As a member of the Clare senior football panel O'Leary won a national league title in 2011.

O'Leary studied Science Education at University of Limerick and is now a science teacher. In 2014 O'Leary played a starring role in UL's Ashbourne victory over WIT.
