= Windgap, County Kilkenny =

Village in Leinster, Ireland

Windgap Bearna na Gaoithe
- Village
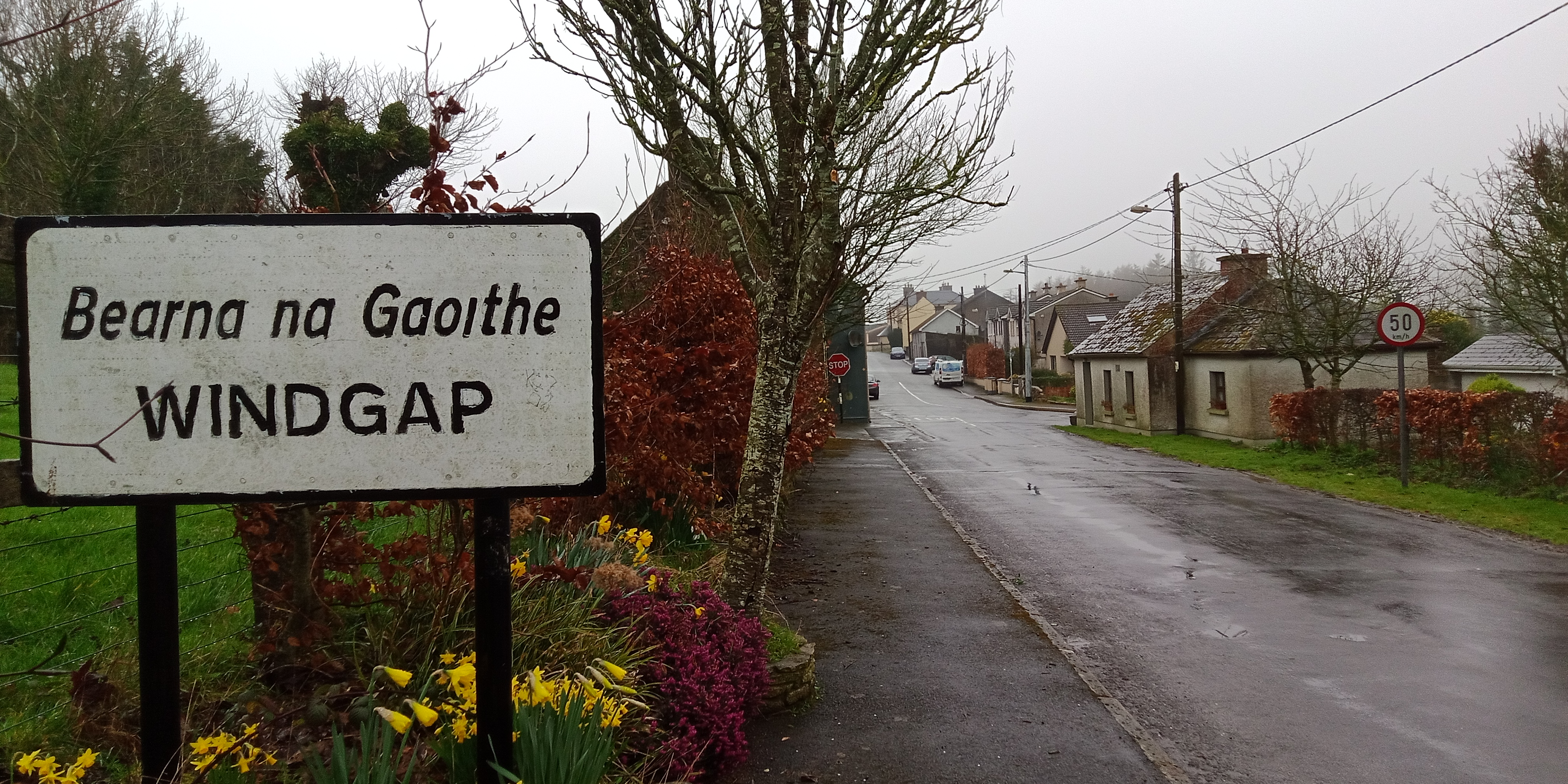
- Entry sign into Windgap from southern approach.

- Location in Ireland
- Coordinates: 52°27′51″N 7°23′55″W
- Country: Ireland
- Province: Leinster
- County: County Kilkenny
- Time zone: UTC+0 (WET)
  - Summer (DST): UTC-1 (IST (WEST))

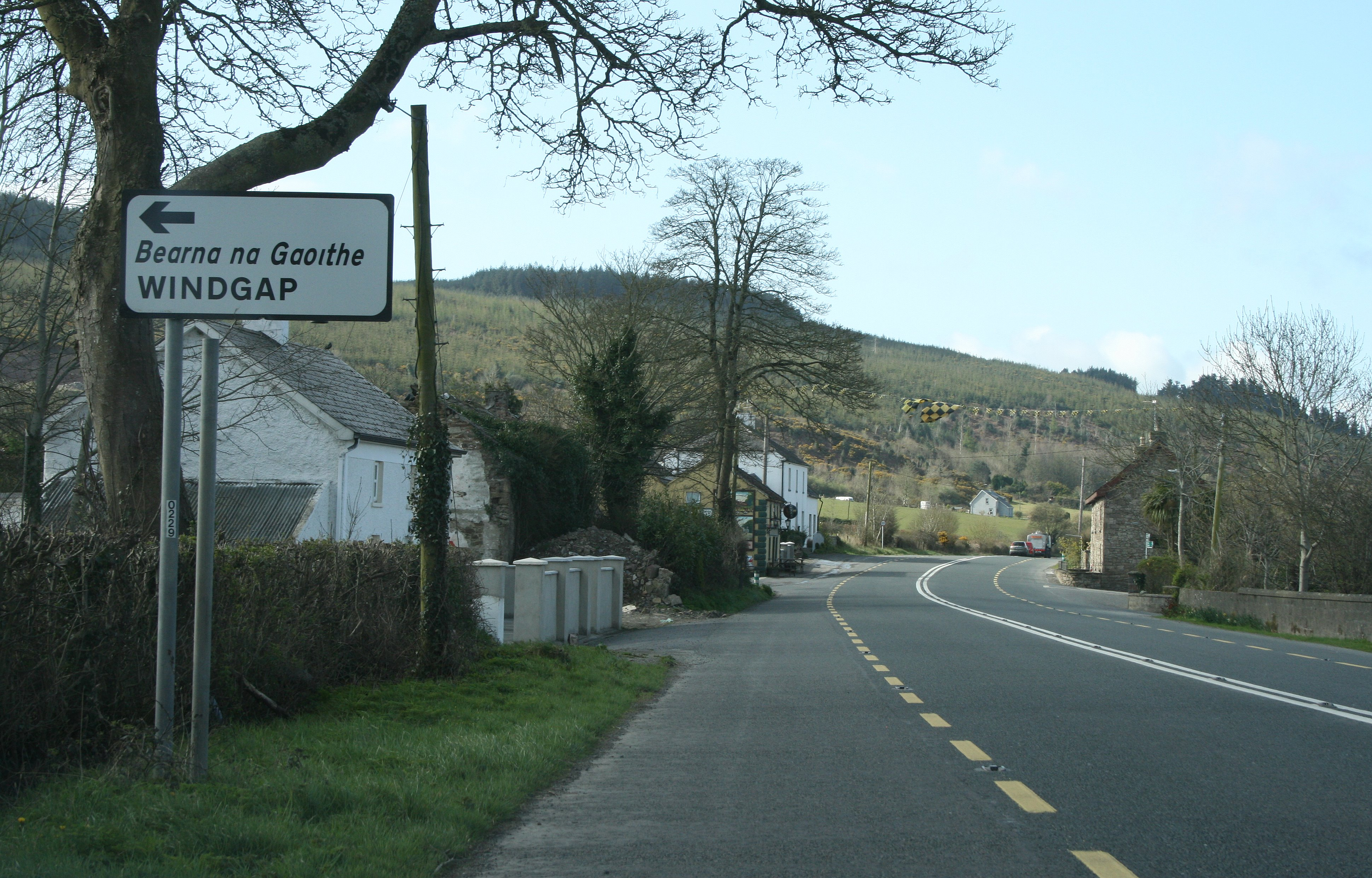
Left off the N76 road

Windgap (Irish: Bearna na Gaoithe, meaning 'the wind gap'), is a village in County Kilkenny, in Ireland. Windgap is located in the south-western part of Kilkenny on the border with Tipperary, just south of Callan. The village is located on the R689 regional road, the nearest main road being the N76 from Kilkenny to Clonmel.

Windgap was named for its location on a pass through hills east of Slievenamon. The landscape of Windgap is dominated by steep hills and large wooded areas. Windgap lies in a former slate-quarrying district spanning the Kilkenny-Tipperary border. Today, agriculture is Windgap's main economic activity, with dairy products as the main export. The most notable buildings in Windgap are its 19th-century graveyard, The Old League House, which once served as a home for poor tenant farmers (see Irish National Land League), and early 20th-century grotto.

Those who hail from the village are sometimes referred to as 'Gappers'.

== History and culture ==
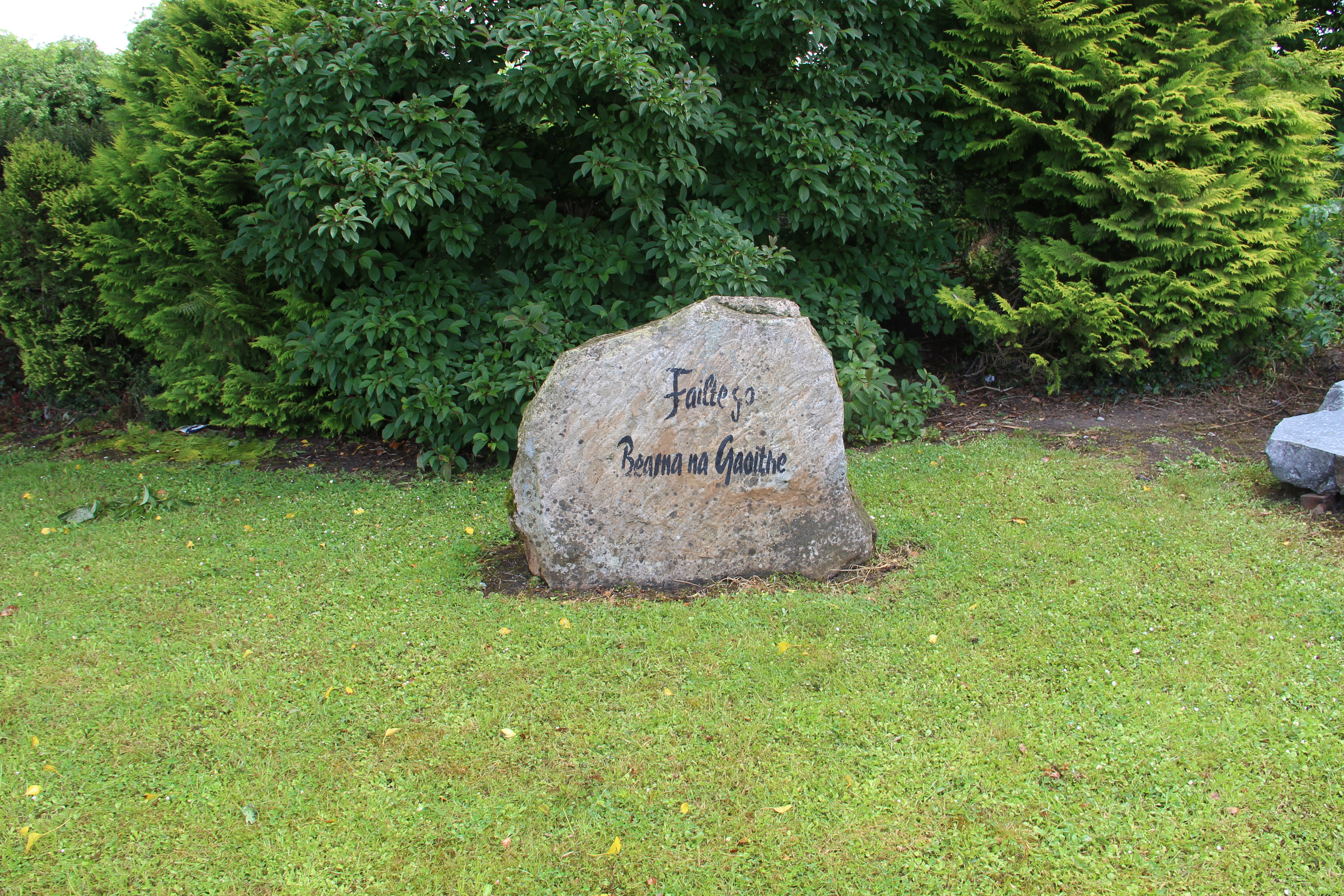
"Welcome to Windgap", written in Irish (Fáilte go Bearna na Gaoithe)

The Mayor of Windgap is an 1835 novel by Michael Banim set in Windgap in 1779. Windgap is also referred to in the 1907 book The Placenames of the Decies by Rev. P. Power.

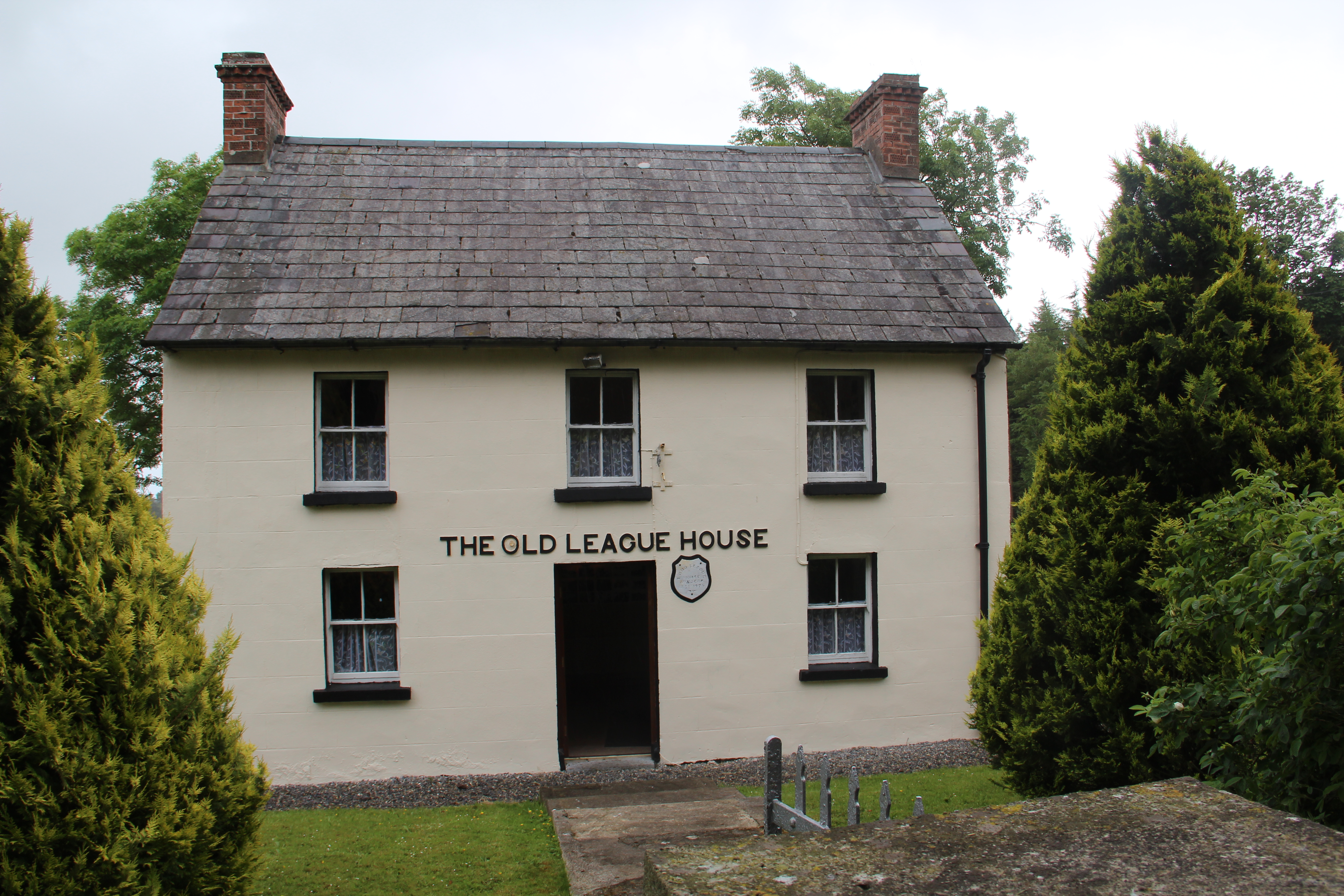
The Old (Land) League House (1881–1979)

== Sport ==
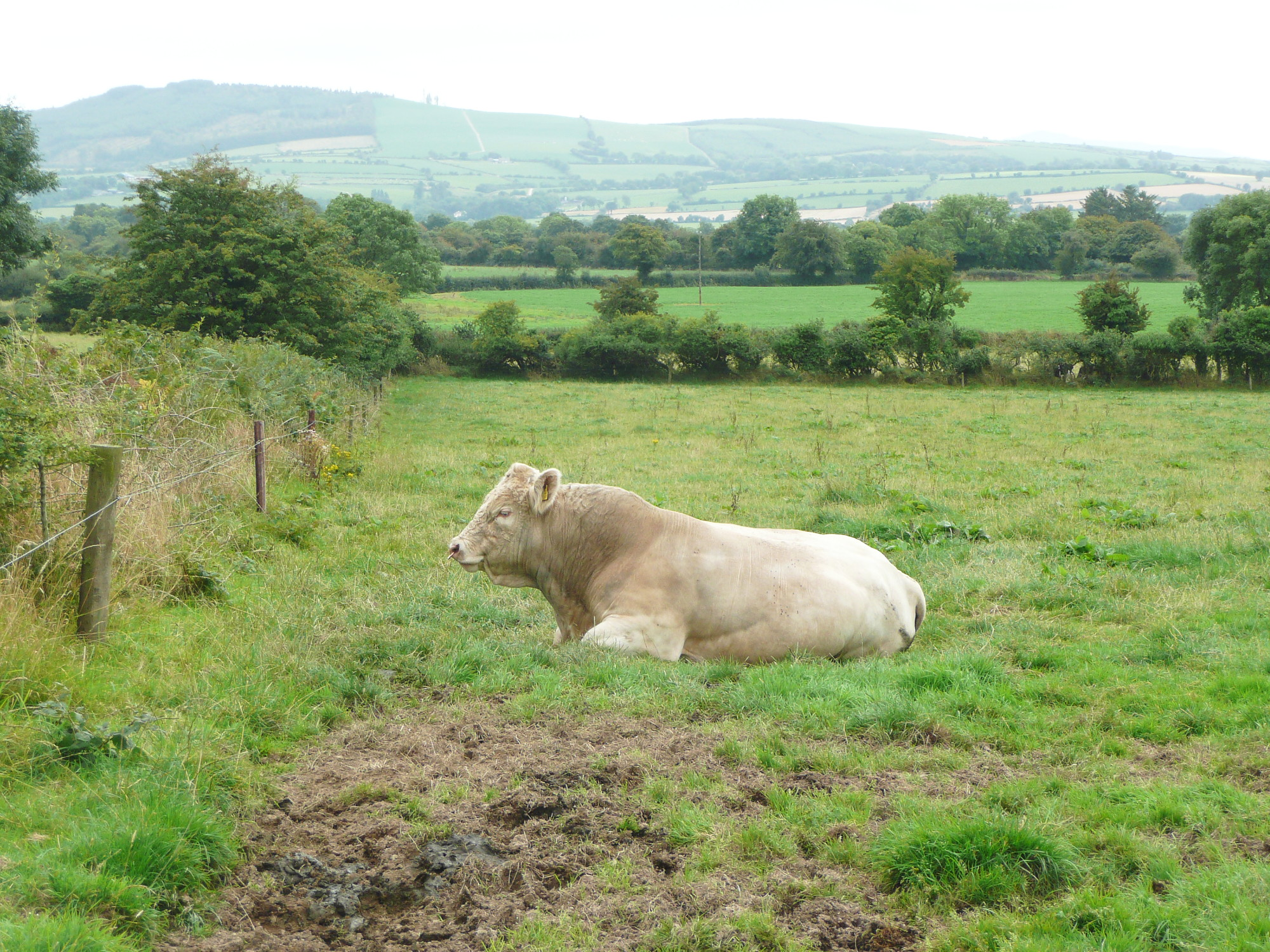
Pastoral scene slightly westwards of the village proper.

Windgap GAA club was founded in 1954 following the advent of the "one parish rule" in the county. Gaelic games have been played in the area since the 1890s. In the early days, it was better known for football, but hurling was played with the Slatequarries in 1929 and St. Joseph 's in Tullahought in the 1940s. Handball first made its appearance in the Slatequarries in the early 1900s before it spread to Windgap. Camogie started in Lamogue in the 1920s and was played in many areas of the parish with teams representing Windgap and Tullahought at various stages. Ladies Football was played in the area for a time in the 1970s with a team in Tullahought. Windgap Camogie Club that was founded in 1994 and Windgap Handball Club in 1984. Galmoy and Windgap's teams amalgamated in 2005.

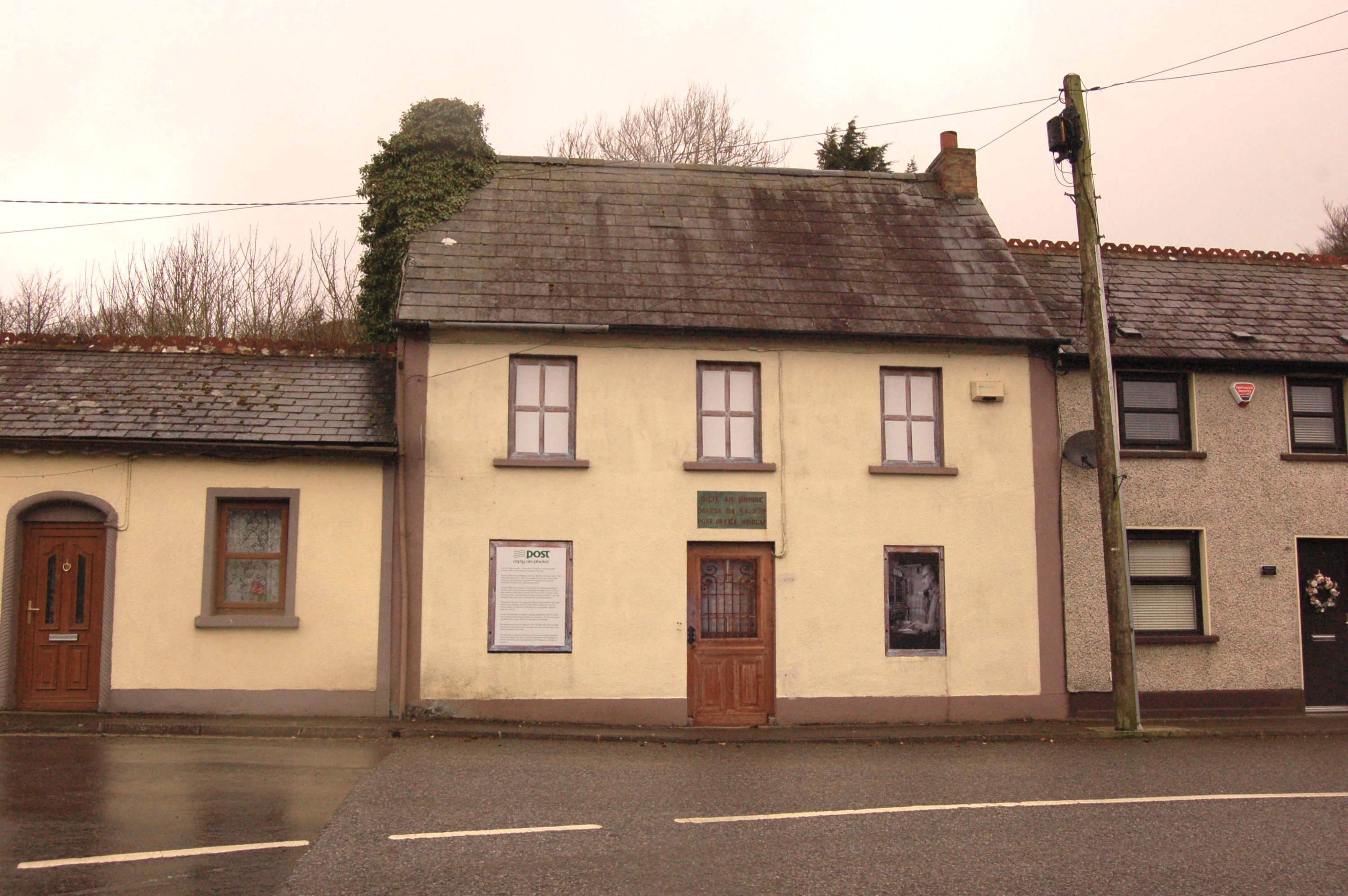
Windgap Post Office.

== Notable people ==
- John Banim (1798–1842), writer
- Fearghus Ó Fearghail, priest and academic

== See also ==
- List of towns and villages in Ireland

== Sources ==
- Banim, John (1835). The Mayor of Wind-gap. Baudry's European Library.
