= All-Ireland Senior Club Camogie Championship 2003 =

Camogie championship

Winners
- Champions: Granagh-Ballingarry (Limerick) (3rd title)
- Captain: Kay Burke

Runners-up
- Runners-up: Davitts (Gal)

The 2003 All-Ireland Senior Club Camogie Championship for the leading clubs in the women's team field sport of camogie was won by Granagh-Ballingarry (Limerick), who defeated Davitts (Gal) in the final, played at Mullingar.

== Arrangements ==
The championship was organised on the traditional provincial system used in Gaelic Games since the 1880s, with Freshford of Kilkenny and Dunloy of Antrim winning the championships of the other two provinces. Lourda Kavanagh scored 11 points for Granagh to beat Dunloy in the semi-final.

== Final ==
Lourda Kavanagh scored 1–3 for Granagh-Ballingarry as they defeated Davitts by four points in the final.

=== Final stages ===
September 1
Semi-Final

Granagh-Ballingarry (Limerick)	2–11 – 0–10	St Lachtain’s Freshford

September 8
Semi-Final

Davitts (Gal)	2–14 – 3–4	Dunloy

Pearse Park, Dunloy

November 2
Final

Granagh-Ballingarry (Limerick)	1–10 – 1–8	Davitts (Gal)

Mullingar

Granagh-Ballingarry	Davitts

Granagh-Ballingarry
GK	1	Breda O'Brien
RCB	2	Aimee McCarthy
FB	3	Laura Leslie (captain)
LCB	4	Maureen O'Gorman
RWB	5	Kay Burke
CB	6	Ber Chawk
LWB	7	Deidre Sheehan
MF	8	Marie Collins
MF	9	Vera Sheehan
RWF	10	Jean Cullinane
CF	11	Eileen O'Brien
LWF	12	Aoifa Sheehan
RCF	13	Joanne Clifford
FF	14	Meadhbh Nash
LCF	15	Fiona Morrissey

Davitts
GK	1	Michelle Tynan
RCB	2	Orla Watson
FB	3	Rita Broder ick
LCB	4	Lisa Fahy
RWB	5	Fiona Pierce
CB	6	Anne Broderick
LWB	7	Lizzie Flynn
MF	8	Ailbhe Kelly
MF	9	Caroline Kelly
RWF	10	Doreen Kelly
CF	11	Deidre Murphy
LWF	12	Caitriona Kelly
RCF	13	Olivia Forde
FF	14	Lourda Kavanagh
LCF	15	Mary Kelly

Preceded by All-Ireland Senior Club Camogie Championship 2002	All-Ireland Senior Club Camogie Championship; 1964 – present	Succeeded by All-Ireland Senior Club Camogie Championship 2004
