= All-Ireland Senior Club Camogie Championship 2004 =

Camogie championship

Winners
- Champions: St Lachtain’s, Freshford (Kilkenny) (1st title)
- Captain: Imelda Kennedy

Runners-up
- Runners-up: Granagh-Ballingarry (Limerick)

The 2004 All-Ireland Senior Club Camogie Championship for the leading clubs in the women's team field sport of camogie was won by St Lachtain’s, Freshford (Kilkenny), who defeated Granagh-Ballingarry from Limerick in the final, played at Parnell Park.

== Arrangements ==
The championship was organised on the traditional provincial system used in Gaelic Games since the 1880s, with Davitts and O'Donovan Rossa winning the championships of the other two provinces.

== The Final ==
A close-range goal from Imelda Kennedy gave St Lachtain’s a half-time lead of 1–3 to 0–4 in the final, and further points from Kennedy widened the gap and Marie Connor palmed the ball for the decisive goal.

=== Final stages ===
September 1
Semi-Final

St Lachtain’s, Freshford (Kilkenny)	5-6 – 0-5	Davitts

September 8
Semi-Final

Granagh-Ballingarry (Limerick)	1-11 – 0-4	O'Donovan Rossa

November 7
Final

St Lachtain’s, Freshford (Kilkenny)	2-8 – 0-7	Granagh-Ballingarry (Limerick)

Parnell Park

St Lachtain’s, Freshford (Kilkenny)	Granagh-Ballingarry (Limerick)

St Lachtain’s
GK	1	5inéad Costello
RCB	2	Danielle Minogue
FB	3	Gillian Dillon
LCB	4	Mairéad Lawlor
RWB	5	Deidre Delaney
CB	6	Mairéad Costello
LWB	7	Anne Connery
MF	8	Esther Kennedy
MF	9	Aoife Fitzpatrick
RWF	10	Margaret Kavanagh
CF	11	Sinéad Connery
LWF	12	Imelda Kennedy (captain)
RCF	13	Ann Dalton
FF	14	Marie Connor
LCF	15	Eileen Fitzpatrick

Granagh-Ballingarry
GK	1	Breda O'Brien
RCB	2	Brenie Molloy
FB	3	Brenie Chawke
LCB	4	Maureen Gorman
RWB	5	Kay Burke
CB	6	Maeve Nash
LWB	7	Deirdre Sheehan (captain)
MF	8	Vera Sheehan
MF	9	Marie Collins
RWF	10	Joan Cullinane
CF	11	Eileen O'Brien
LWF	12	Aoifa Sheehan
RCF	13	Fiona Chawke
FF	14	Fiona Morrissey
LCF	15	Joanne Clifford

Preceded by All-Ireland Senior Club Camogie Championship 2003	All-Ireland Senior Club Camogie Championship; 1964 – present	Succeeded by All-Ireland Senior Club Camogie Championship 2005
