= All-Ireland Senior Club Camogie Championship 1999 =

Camogie championship

Winners
- Champions: Granagh-Ballingarry (Limerick) (2nd title)
- Manager: Mike Chawke
- Captain: Kay Burke

Runners-up
- Runners-up: Davitts (Gal)

The 1999 All-Ireland Senior Club Camogie Championship for the leading clubs in the women's team field sport of camogie was won by Granagh-Ballingarry (of Limerick), who defeated Davitts (o Galway) in the final, played at Tynagh. It was the first club championship to be played with 15 a side.

== Arrangements ==
The championship was organised on the traditional provincial system used in Gaelic Games since the 1880s, with St Lachtain’s, Freshford (of Kilkenny) and Leitrim Fontenoys (of Down) winning the championships of the other two provinces. Jean Cullinane scored Granagh’s goal in the semi-final as they came from 1–4 to 0-2 behind at half time to beat St Lachtain’s. Davitt’s qualified for the final with two goals either side of half time from Mary Treacy and further goals from Doreen Kelly and Mary Treacy. Maureen McAleenan, who scored four points, was the best of the Leitrim Fontenoys team.

== Final ==
Eileen O'Brien was the Granagh star in the final, scoring 1–3, while Caitríona Finnegan scored a long-range goal for Davitt’s.

=== Final stages ===
September 1
Semi-Final

Granagh-Ballingarry (Limerick)	1–10 – 1–9	St Lachtain’s, Freshford (Kilkenny)

Granagh-Ballingarry

September 8
Semi-Final

Davitts (Galway)	4–10 – 0–8	Leitrim Fontenoys (Down)

November 28
Final

Granagh-Ballingarry (Limerick)	2–4 – 1–3	Davitts (Gal)

Tynagh

Granagh-Ballingarry (Limerick)	Davitts (Gal)

Granagh-Ballingarry
GK	1	Breda O'Brien
RCB	2	Patsy McKenna
FB	3	Benie O'Brien
LCB	4	Mairéad Cagney
RWB	5	Kay Burke (captain)
CB	6	Benie Chawke
LWB	7	Maureen Sheehan
MF	8	Vera Sheehan
MF	9	Mary O'Connor
RWF	10	Jean Cullinane
CF	11	Deidre Sheehan
LWF	12	Eileen O'Brien
RCF	13	Aoifa Sheehan
FF	14	Kathryn Leslie
LCF	15	Joanne Clifford

Davitts
GK	1	Fiona Gohery
RCB	2	Orla Watson
FB	3	Anne Dolan
LCB	4	Fiona Pierce
RWB	5	Anne Broderick
CB	6	Rita Broderick (captain)
LWB	7	Edel Pierce
MF	8	Caitríona Finnegan
MF	9	Ailbhe Kelly
RWF	10	Doreen Kelly
CF	11	Olivia Broderick
LWF	12	Lourda Kavanagh
RCF	13	Lisa Daly
FF	14	Breda Daniels
LCF	15	Mary Treacy

Preceded by All-Ireland Senior Club Camogie Championship 1998	All-Ireland Senior Club Camogie Championship; 1964 – present	Succeeded by All-Ireland Senior Club Camogie Championship 2000
