= All-Ireland Senior Club Camogie Championship 1998 =

Camogie championship

Winners
- Champions: Granagh-Ballingarry (Limerick) (1st title)
- Manager: Mike Chawke
- Captain: Vera Sheehan

Runners-up
- Runners-up: St Vincents (Du)
- Captain: Germaine Noonan

The 1998 All-Ireland Senior Club Camogie Championship for the leading clubs in the women's team field sport of camogie was won by Granagh-Ballingarry from Limerick, who defeated St Vincents from Dublin in the final, played at Ballingarry. It was the last club championship final to be played with 12-a-side.

== Arrangements ==
The championship was organised on the traditional provincial system used in Gaelic Games since the 1880s, with Pearses (who were from Galway) and Leitrim Fontenoys (who were from Down) winning the championships of the other two provinces. Eileen O'Brien, a student at St Mary’s, Charleville, was chief playmaker and scored 1–7 herself as Granagh-Ballingarry defeated three-in-a-row chasing Pearses from Galway in the semi-final. Louise Lynch, Denise O'Leary and Denise Smith scored St Vincent’s goals in the other semi-final.

== Final ==
Granagh-Ballingarry took an eight-point lead after 20 minutes of the final and went on to win by 11. Tom Humphries wrote in the Irish Times:

A crowd of about 3,500 made the journey to the tiny village of Ballingarry to see two sides with formidable CVs. Granagh-Ballingarry are the product of a merger in the late '70s but Ballingarry's record of success stretches back to the late 1920s and early '30s. St Vincent's are another amalgamation job, the Dublin giants Marino having thrown in their lot with the local GAA club a few years ago. St Vincent's escaped Leinster after years of trying this year and the method used was quick ground hurling. Pulling on the ball before it had time to nestle in the turf. They got to Limerick yesterday to find that the elements had conspired against them. The pitch was so heavy and sodden that it was a wonder the game was played at all. With the ball steadfastly refusing to move along the grass the home team produced the style of play designed to maximise home advantage. Jean Cullinane and Eileen O'Brien launched scores on the run from 30 and 40 yards out respectively. The confident execution put an end to all arguments.

Niamh Cregan on the Vincents’ team was daughter of All-Ireland hurler, Éamonn Cregan.

=== Final stages ===
September 1
Semi-Final

Granagh-Ballingarry (Limerick)	2-11 – 1-4	Pearses

Ballymacward

September 8
Semi-Final

St Vincents (Du)	3-12 – 1-8	Leitrim Fontenoys

Raheny

November 22
Final

Granagh-Ballingarry (Limerick)	1-19 – 1-8	St Vincents (Du)

Ballingarry

Granagh-Ballingarry (Limerick)	St Vincents (Du)

Granagh-Ballingarry (Limerick):
GK	1	Breda O'Brien
FB	2	Benie O'Brien
RWB	3	Patricia McKenna
CB	4	Benie Chawke
LWB	5	Laura Leslie
MF	6	Jean Cullinane
MF	7	Deidre Sheehan
MF	8	Kay Burke
RWF	9	Eileen O'Brien
CF	10	Mary O'Connor
LWF	11	Vera Sheehan (captain)
FF	12	Ida Quaid

St Vincents (Du):
GK	1	Mary Regan
FB	2	Patsy Murphy
RWB	3	Niamh Cregan
CB	4	Patricia Clinton
LWB	5	Germaine Noonan (captain)
MF	6	Ursula Hannon
MF	7	Denise O'Leary
MF	8	Róisín Brady
RWF	9	Louise Lynch
CF	10	Adrienne McGovern
LWF	11	Denise Smith
FF	12	Emer Brannigan

Preceded by All-Ireland Senior Club Camogie Championship 1997	All-Ireland Senior Club Camogie Championship; 1964 – present	Succeeded by All-Ireland Senior Club Camogie Championship 1999
