= R518 road =

R518 road may refer to:

- R518 road (Ireland)
- R518 (South Africa)
