= Fenian Rising =

1867 rebellion against British rule in Ireland

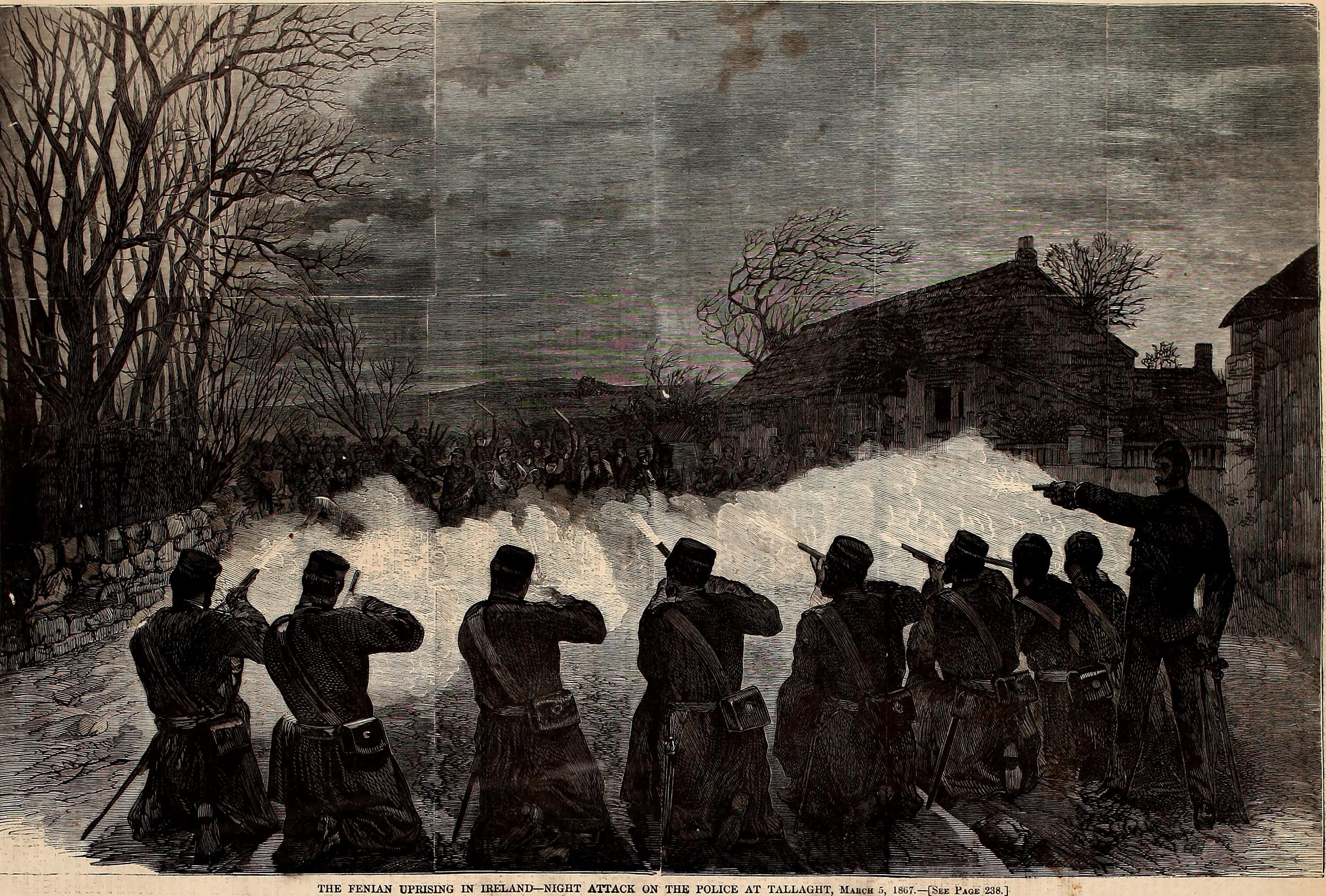
- Irish Constabulary members fire on Fenians in Tallaght, 5 March 1867 (Harper's Weekly)
Date	14 February 1867 – March 1867
Location	Ireland, England
Result	Rebellion suppressed

Belligerents
Irish Republican Brotherhood: Fenian Brotherhood	United Kingdom

Commanders and leaders
Thomas J. Kelly; James Stephens; Gustave Paul Cluseret; Octave Fariola; Godfrey Massey; William G. Halpin	Sir John Stewart Wood; Marquess of Abercorn; Earl of Derby

Units involved
	Irish Constabulary; Dublin Metropolitan Police

The Fenian Rising (Irish: Éirí Amach na bhFíníní, IPA: [ˈeːɾʲiː əˈmˠax n̪ˠə ˈvʲiːnʲiːnʲiː]) was a rebellion against British rule in Ireland organised by the Irish Republican Brotherhood (IRB). After the suppression of the Irish People newspaper in September 1865, disaffection among Irish radical nationalists continued to smoulder, and during the later part of 1866, IRB leader James Stephens endeavoured to raise funds in the United States for a fresh rising planned for the following year.

Recreation of one of the Fenian Flags used during the 1867 Rebellion

However the rising of 1867 proved poorly organised. A brief rising took place in County Kerry in February, followed by an attempt at nationwide insurrection, including an attempt to take Dublin in early March. Due to poor planning and infiltration of the nationalists by the Dublin Castle administration, the rebellion never got off the ground. Most of the leaders in Ireland were arrested, but although some of them were sentenced to death, none were executed. The IRB subsequently carried out a series of attacks in England aimed at freeing Fenian prisoners, including a bomb in London and an attack on a prison van in Manchester, for which three Fenians, subsequently known as the Manchester martyrs, were executed in November 1867.

== Background ==
The Fenians were a transatlantic association consisting of the Irish Republican Brotherhood, founded in Dublin by James Stephens in 1858, and the Fenian Brotherhood, founded in the United States by John O'Mahony and Michael Doheny, also in 1858. Their aim was the establishment of an independent Irish Republic by force of arms. The Great Famine of 1845–50 had killed about a million people, and caused another million to emigrate, hardening Irish attitudes to British rule. In 1865, the Fenians began preparing for a rebellion. With the ending of the American Civil War, they hoped to recruit willing Irish veterans of that war for an insurrection in Ireland. They collected about 6,000 firearms and had as many as 50,000 men willing to fight. In September 1865, the British moved to close down the Fenians' newspaper The Irish People and arrested much of the leadership, including John O'Leary, Jeremiah O'Donovan Rossa, Bryan Dillon, Thomas Clarke Luby and Stephens. Stephens, the leader of the movement, later escaped. In 1866, habeas corpus was suspended in Ireland and there were hundreds more arrests of Fenian activists.

The Irish People had been founded in Dublin in November 1863, with Luby as proprietor, O'Leary as editor and O'Donovan Rossa as business manager, and had championed both Irish republicanism and, according to the historian Marta Ramón, a radical social programme centred on peasant proprietorship, social egalitarianism and independence from clerical influence in politics. Between 27 November 1865 and 2 February 1866, a Special Commission sat in Green Street courthouse in Dublin, and later in Cork, to try Stephens, O'Leary, O'Donovan Rossa, Charles Kickham and others for treason-felony; it was the first such Commission convened in Dublin since the 1803 trial of Robert Emmet. Luby and O'Leary received twenty years' penal servitude, O'Donovan Rossa a life sentence and Kickham twelve years, sentences that were widely criticised in the British press as excessive. The evidence against several of the accused rested heavily on the testimony of the informer Pierce Nagle, an employee of the Irish People who had been passing information to Dublin Castle since 1864.

Stephens's successor as leader, Thomas J. Kelly tried to launch the insurrection in early 1867, but it proved uncoordinated and fizzled in a series of skirmishes. The plan was for a country-wide campaign of guerrilla warfare, accompanied by an uprising in Dublin in which Fenian fighters would link up with Irish troops who had mutinied and take the military barracks in the city.

Separately from the movement in Ireland, the American wing of the Fenian Brotherhood split in 1865 over strategy: one faction, led by John O'Mahony, wished to concentrate resources on a rising in Ireland, while a rival "Senate wing" under William R. Roberts favoured an invasion of British-controlled Canada, intended to force a British withdrawal from Ireland in exchange for the return of Canadian territory. Fenian raids into Canada led by former Union general John O'Neill took place in June 1866, including a victory over Canadian militia at Ridgeway, Ontario, but the raids were checked when United States troops intervened to block Fenian supply lines and arrest their leaders. The diversion of American money and manpower towards the Canadian scheme left the home organisation in Ireland correspondingly short of funds and arms in the run-up to 1867.

== Preparation ==
In February 1867, the Fenians, including Michael Davitt, attempted to seize weapons from Chester Castle in order to obtain arms for the rising. The plan relied on support from Irish immigrants and their descendants in England. The rebels intended to cut telegraph lines, use railway stock to reach Holyhead, commandeer ships, and launch a surprise attack on Dublin before the authorities could respond. However, the plot was foiled when John Joseph Corydon, a trusted agent of Fenian leader James Stephens, informed the government.

The Chester scheme had been drawn up by Captain John McCafferty, an Irish-American who had served with the Confederate army during the American Civil War, together with the journalist John Flood, both of whom sat on a "Directory" of Fenians in England. Large bodies of Fenians converged on Chester on 11 February 1867, but McCafferty called off the attack after learning that the plan had been betrayed to the authorities by Corydon, and he and Flood attempted to reach Dublin aboard a collier, only to be arrested on landing. McCafferty had earlier been tried and acquitted for treason-felony in 1865 before a rare mixed jury, on the grounds that as a foreign national he could not be held liable for acts committed outside the jurisdiction before he entered the country; at his second trial in 1867 he was convicted of high treason and sentenced to death, a sentence subsequently commuted.

=== Leadership and military planning ===
Following his escape from America in December 1866, Stephens was deposed as military leader of the American wing of the Brotherhood after he again postponed the promised rising, citing inadequate preparations; Godfrey Massey, a former sergeant in the British Army land transport corps who had adopted the name Massey after serving in the American Civil War (reputedly with the Confederacy), was among the most active in bringing about Stephens's removal. Colonel Kelly was chosen to lead the rising in Stephens's place and travelled to Paris in January 1867 with Thomas Francis Bourke, William G. Halpin, McCafferty and the French soldier of fortune General Gustave Cluseret, who had served in the Italian and American civil wars and had been appointed commander-in-chief of the projected Irish forces on condition he be supplied with 10,000 armed men. Cluseret's chief of staff was Colonel Octave Fariola, a Belgo-Italian who had also served as a colonel in the Federal army during the American Civil War; Fariola later published a detailed account of the planning of the rising in the Irishman newspaper.

On 10 February 1867 a "Provisional Government of the Irish Republic" was established in London under Kelly's chairmanship, with representatives for each of the four provinces: Edward Duffy for Connacht, William Harbison for Ulster, Edward O'Byrne for Leinster and Dominick Mahony for Munster. Cluseret was confirmed as commander-in-chief, with a scaled-down plan calling for 5,000 armed men rather than the 10,000 he had originally demanded. Massey, entrusted with the task of reporting on the readiness of the organisation in Ireland, visited Dublin, Cork, Castlebar and Tipperary in February, reporting to Kelly on 24 February that "every district was duly organised, the chiefs were at their posts, well-instructed, the men ready to rise". He returned to Ireland to announce the date and plan of the rising, midnight on 5 March, to a meeting of Dublin centres convened by O'Byrne on 26 February.

Fariola's plan called for the rising to proceed in two stages, beginning with a guerrilla phase in which small, mobile bands of fifteen to twenty men would avoid pitched engagements with troops or police, cutting roads, railways, telegraphs and bridges to keep the country "in a perpetual state of apprehension and insecurity", before a second, regular phase once belligerent recognition and American aid had been secured. Historian Shin-ichi Takagami has argued that the final plan for Dublin represented a shift from earlier schemes by American officers General Francis Frederick Millen and John Devoy, which had centred on a direct assault on Dublin Castle and the city's military barracks, towards a more decentralised strategy in which a large force gathering on Tallaght Hill would draw troops away from the city, allowing smaller Fenian bands within Dublin to act more freely. Command of the Dublin rising was given to General William Halpin, who was to establish his headquarters at Colonel White's demesne at Killakee in the Dublin mountains. Fariola later held that Massey had disregarded these instructions and, in the course of a tour of the country in late February, devised a rival plan of his own to concentrate unarmed Fenians in large bodies in order to march on and besiege Limerick city by force from outside, disrupting the arrangements Fariola had communicated to district officers. Fariola travelled to Ireland to assess the situation but was unable to make contact with Massey until 2 March, by which time it was too late to countermand his orders; as a result, according to Fariola, Connacht was left without a military officer to take command, and Edward Duffy, foreseeing failure, called off the rising in Connacht.

On the evening of 4 March, Massey travelled from Cork towards his headquarters at Limerick Junction, where he was arrested by police; he was reported to have fainted with surprise and, on recovering, agreed to turn informer and give evidence for the Crown. Contemporaries and later historians have disagreed sharply over whether Massey had been a British agent from before his arrest, or whether, as some contemporaries believed, his conduct stemmed from a conviction that the rising was doomed and that surrender would spare lives.

Authorities in Dublin Castle received advance warning of both the date and general strategy of the rising, chiefly through the informer John Joseph Corydon, an American officer based in Liverpool who reported the departure of American officers for Ireland in mid-February and, having attended the 26 February meeting at which Massey issued his instructions, supplied Dublin Castle with the date of the rising on 27 February. Superintendent Daniel Ryan of the Dublin Metropolitan Police independently pieced together information from lower-ranking informers in the city, only confirming the date with confidence on the night of 4 March. Lord Strathnairn, commander-in-chief of the British forces in Ireland, ordered the principal points of Dublin, including the Four Courts, the Custom House, the Royal Exchange and the main railway termini, to be guarded, while cavalry and artillery were held ready to respond once the Fenians had moved into the open.

=== Ulster ===
Although a rising had been prepared in Ulster, where the IRB had established a base among the Catholic population of the Pound district of west Belfast as well as pockets of activity in Monaghan and Tyrone, the decision was taken in February 1867 not to proceed, owing to the strength of the military garrison in Belfast and the damage done to the organisation by the mass arrests that followed the 1866 suspension of habeas corpus. The arrest of the north's chief organiser, William Harbison, shortly before 5 March further weakened the Ulster IRB; Harbison later died in prison, and his funeral drew over 10,000 mourners onto the streets of Belfast. Arms caches were nonetheless discovered by police in Belfast in the weeks either side of the rising, including a substantial haul of Enfield rifles, revolvers, swords and pike-heads at a house in Hamill Street in January 1867 and a further haul in Pound Street on 11 March, less than a week after the failed rising at Tallaght.

== Rising ==
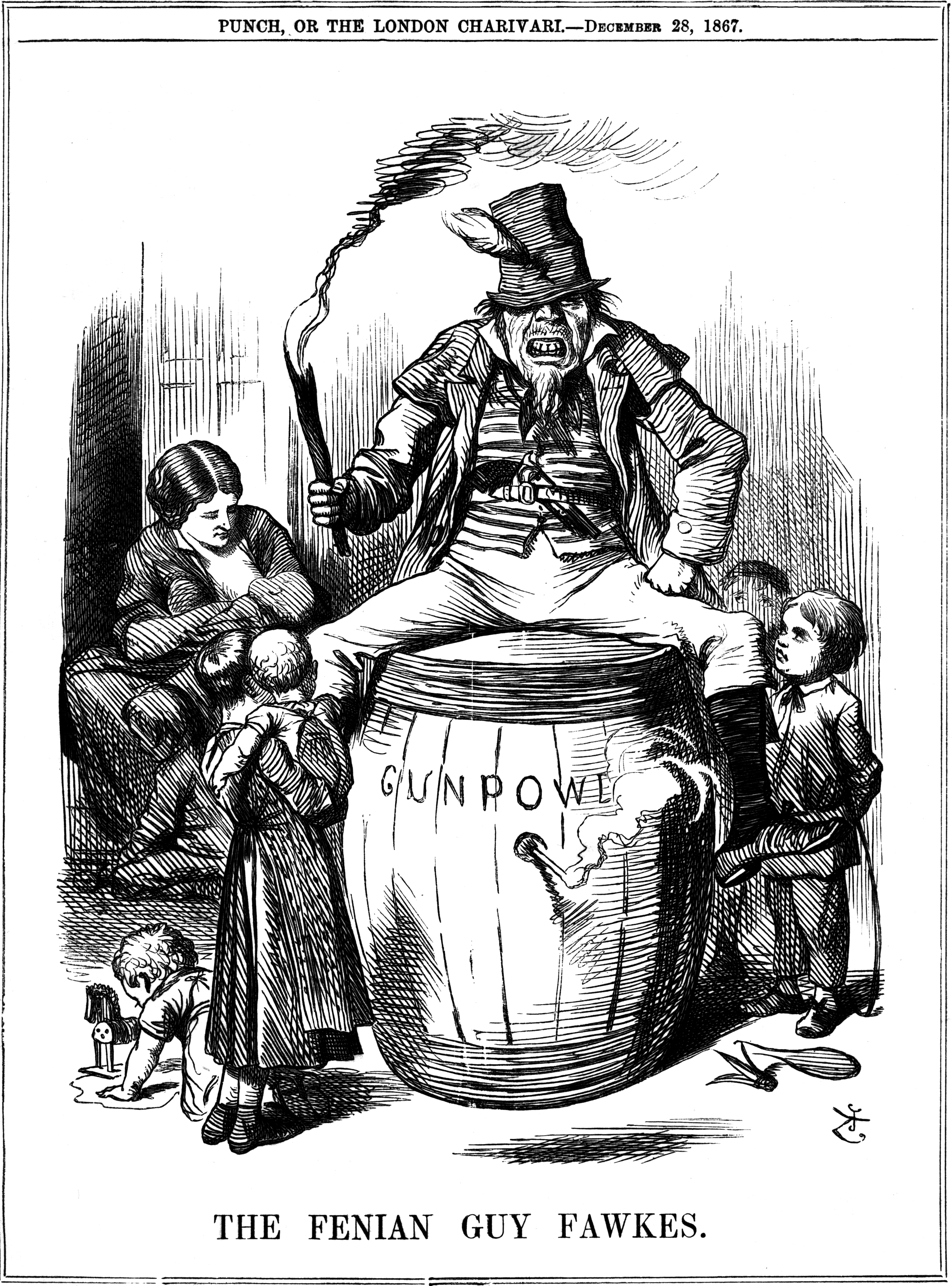
A Punch cartoon referring to the events

On 14 February 1867 there was an attempted rising in County Kerry. The Fenians attacked a coastguard station, robbed a man's house and stole his horses, and killed one policeman before heading towards Killarney. When the Fenians were near the town the presence of the Irish Constabulary and British Army there dissuaded them from attacking it. They then retreated by passing between the Toomey Mountains and MacGillycuddy Reeks.

=== Kerry ===
Contemporary reporting in The Irish Times, reprinted from its edition of 16 February 1867, described the Kerry rising as a "disjointed affair" that dissolved of itself: the local peasantry, the paper claimed, "to a man, refused to have any participation in the movement". Estimates of the number of Fenians involved varied widely in contemporary accounts, from as low as 100 to as many as 1,500, and the party, having shot a policeman and stolen horses, retreated over the mountains through the Gap of Dunloe when word reached them that troops and constabulary were stationed in Killarney. The report attributed leadership of the Kerry party to a man named O'Connor, said to be a naturalised American who had served in the Federal army, and speculated that the wider plan for risings at Chester, Dublin and Kerry had been devised by James Stephens, who was reported to have been in Paris shortly beforehand.

=== Dublin ===
On 26 February 1867, the Dublin centre got word that they were to start the rising on the 5 March 1867. The centres were not to reach out until twenty-four hours before the rising. Before the rising the authorities had learned not only the date, but also the Fenians' strategy. On 5 March 1867, risings took place in Dublin, Cork City and Limerick. The largest of these engagements took place at Tallaght, County Dublin, when several hundred Fenians, on their way to the meeting point at Tallaght Hill, were attacked by the Constabulary near the police barracks, and were driven off after a firefight. William Domville Handcock gives an account of the event (and the lead up to it) in his 1877 book The History and Antiquities of Tallaght in the County of Dublin:

Early in March, 1867, there were rumours of a rising of the Fenians. They had been drilling, and had prepared pikes, guns and ammunition in the approved style of such rebellions. On Tuesday night, the 4th of March, 1867, large bodies of men moved along the Crumlin, Greenhills, Rathmines, and other roads, towards Tallaght. Their object was known to the police, and they were watched. They were not, however, interfered with, as the Government wished them, apparently, to commit some overt act of rebellion. It is not easy otherwise to account for the indifference with which they were allowed to collect arms and organise their forces, while nearly all their affairs being well known to the authorities, by means of paid informers.

Historians have estimated that several thousand Fenians, possibly as many as 7,000 to 8,000 according to police observation, reached the assembly point on Tallaght Hill during the night of 5–6 March, and that the British authorities, though they moved cavalry and infantry columns towards the hills, were unable to penetrate the mountainous terrain in darkness and made comparatively few arrests among the main body. Contemporary press reports were less consistent: the Freeman's Journal initially put the number on the hill at 4,000 to 5,000, revising this the following day to around 2,000. According to Takagami, the failure of the rising in Dublin owed less to the brief skirmish that took place at Tallaght police barracks itself than to the absence of any effective leadership among the large body of men who succeeded in reaching the hill; General Halpin, who was to have coordinated the rising from his headquarters at Killakee, was left waiting there overnight with only a single circle of some fifty or sixty men, and no word arrived from the other assembly points.

Sub-Inspector Dominic Burke, who commanded fifteen constables at Tallaght barracks, adopted a defensive line across the road outside the barracks rather than allowing his men to be confined inside the building; three separate parties of Fenians approaching from different directions withdrew when challenged, but a fourth group under the Tallaght centre Stephen O'Donoghue, reported to have numbered around 150 men, of whom only twenty were armed with rifles, opened fire and was met with a volley from the police, mortally wounding both O'Donoghue and Thomas Farrell. The two men killed at Tallaght are buried in the Fenian Plot at Glasnevin Cemetery. The Irish Times, reporting on 7 March 1867, described the outbreak in Dublin as "a total failure" and praised the "gallant conduct" of the Constabulary at Tallaght and elsewhere. That report noted that around 200 men assembled near Dundrum in the early hours of 6 March, marched on the Stepaside constabulary station, fired on it and attempted to burn it with straw, before scattering into the mountains, discarding pikes and ammunition along their route.

==== Dundrum, Stepaside and Glencullen ====
A separate, better-armed column of some 600 to 700 Fenians assembled that night at Palmerston Park under Captain Patrick Lennon, a deserter from the 9th Lancers, flying a green flag emblazoned "Remember Emmet". The column, which included a horse-drawn ammunition cart carrying 17,000 rounds, was joined at Windy Arbour by a further well-armed detachment under Captain John Kirwan, a former sergeant in the Irish Papal Brigade, who took command of the combined force of around 700 men. Historian Shin-ichi Takagami has described Kirwan's circle as the best-drilled and most effectively led of the groups that took the field that night. The column attacked and briefly exchanged fire with the fortified Irish Constabulary barracks at Dundrum, during which Kirwan was wounded and command passed to Lennon, before moving on towards Stepaside. At Stepaside, reached at around 2am, the barracks was besieged for over an hour; the defenders, led by Constable McIlwaine, eventually surrendered after the Fenians broke in the barricaded windows and threatened to set the building alight with straw.

Taking their prisoners with them, the column marched towards Bray, intending to link up with a force expected to have already taken the military barracks there, but retreated on learning that the Bray barracks was strongly defended and that cavalry were advancing from Dublin. They then turned back into the Dublin mountains, requisitioning bread from a bakery at Golden Ball, before laying siege to the police barracks at Glencullen between six and seven in the morning; after an exchange of fire lasting about an hour, the barracks surrendered on condition that its constables be released unharmed. Lennon disbanded the column at Rockbrook once it became clear that the main Fenian force had already been routed at Tallaght, and the men dispersed individually back towards the city. Among those in the column was Patrick Doran, a 28-year-old Dubliner who was arrested with a companion near Dundrum village as they attempted to make their way back into the city.

=== Cork ===
Following the intrigues of Corydon, an American officer, Captain Condon, who had been appointed military commander of Cork, was arrested a few days before the rising, disrupting the city's preparations. Fenians from the north side of the city gathered at Prayer Hill, where Captain William F. Lomasney ("Captain Mackay") declined to assume command of the 1,500 to 2,000 largely unarmed men who had mustered there; leadership instead fell to James F. X. O'Brien, a civilian volunteer with no military experience, who led a few hundred men towards Mallow, attacking the police barracks at Ballyknockane before dispersing on the approach of troops.

Fenianism had particularly deep roots in Munster, where activists including Brian Dillon and James Mountain in Cork city had been early and lifelong supporters of the movement from its foundation. On the night of the rising, some 400 Fenians from Midleton, together with contingents from Ballinacurra, Cloyne and Carrigtwohill under the carpenter Timothy Daly, attacked Castlemartyr constabulary barracks but failed to take it; the insurgents fled after Daly was shot dead. In Cork city, around 1,500 Fenians marched north under Lomasney and succeeded in taking Ballyknockane constabulary barracks near Mallow, though the British Army began making arrests soon afterwards. Peter O'Neill Crowley, a farmer from Ballymacoda who led a party of Fenians, some armed only with sharpened rasps fastened to rake handles, to seize rifles from the coastguard station at Knockadoon, subsequently disbanded his followers on recognising the hopelessness of the situation and went on the run; he was shot and killed resisting arrest at Kilclooney Wood on 31 March 1867.

Women played a significant if largely unrecorded role in sustaining the movement in Munster during and after the rising, sheltering fugitives, organising a Ladies' Committee to assist the dependants of detained Fenians, and, in the case of Margaret O'Neill in Lisronagh, helping to plan the escape of prisoners from Clonmel Jail.

=== Limerick and Tipperary ===
The rebels burnt down police barracks at Ballingarry, Emly, Gortavoher, and Roskeen, in County Tipperary. A number of rebels armed with pikes gathered at Ballyhurst outside Tipperary town led by Colonel Thomas Francis Bourke of Fethard. A short battle took place with soldiers of the 31st Regiment which resulted in one man being killed and several wounded. Some escaped, though many were interned in Clonmel gaol to await trial. Before the end of the week the rising in Tipperary was crushed.

Around 40 men attacked a police barracks in Ardagh, County Limerick with guns, muskets and pikes.

At Kilmallock, County Limerick, around 500 Fenians under a leader referred to in constabulary records as "General Dunne" attacked the constabulary barracks at approximately 4am on 6 March. The barracks was defended by Head Constable Richard Adams and fourteen constables, assisted by the constables' wives, who helped keep weapons reloaded during a gunfight that lasted around four hours; when the Fenians attempted to burn the building down they were driven back by gunfire. Sub-Inspector Oliver Mulling, alerted by the sound of gunfire while travelling towards Kilmallock, returned to Kilfinane to gather reinforcements before arriving with eleven constables in total; on his order to open fire, two of the insurgents were killed and a number wounded, and most of the remaining Fenians dispersed, throwing down their weapons. Head Constable Adams was later awarded the Constabulary Medal for his defence of the barracks, presented to him by the Marchioness of Abercorn at the Constabulary Depot in the Phoenix Park in September 1867; at the same ceremony the Lord Lieutenant announced that, as a mark of the Queen's satisfaction with the conduct of the force during the rising, the Irish Constabulary would thereafter be known as the "Royal" Irish Constabulary, with the right to bear the harp and crown as its insignia.

General Godfrey Massey, the Fenian deputy commander-in-chief, was arrested at Limerick Junction on the evening of 4 March, immediately before the wider rising was due to begin, and subsequently turned informer.

A total of twelve people were killed across the country on the day. When it became apparent that the co-ordinated rising that had been planned was not transpiring, most rebels simply went home. The rising failed as a result of lack of arms and planning, but also because of the British authorities' effective use of informers. Most of the Fenian leadership had been arrested before the rebellion took place. However, the rising was not without symbolic significance. The Fenians proclaimed a Provisional Republican government, stating,

The Irish People of the World

We have suffered centuries of outrage, enforced poverty, and bitter misery. Our rights and liberties have been trampled on by an alien aristocracy, who treating us as foes, usurped our lands, and drew away from our unfortunate country all material riches. The real owners of the soil were removed to make room for cattle, and driven across the ocean to seek the means of living, and the political rights denied to them at home, while our men of thought and action were condemned to loss of life and liberty. But we never lost the memory and hope of a national existence. We appealed in vain to the reason and sense of justice of the dominant powers. Our mildest remonstrance's were met with sneers and contempt. Our appeals to arms were always unsuccessful. Today, having no honourable alternative left, we again appeal to force as our last resource. We accept the conditions of appeal, manfully deeming it better to die in the struggle for freedom than to continue an existence of utter serfdom. All men are born with equal rights, and in associating to protect one another and share public burdens, justice demands that such associations should rest upon a basis which maintains equality instead of destroying it. We therefore declare that, unable longer to endure the curse of Monarchical Government, we aim at founding a Republic based on universal suffrage, which shall secure to all the intrinsic value of their labour. The soil of Ireland, at present in the possession of an oligarchy, belongs to us, the Irish people, and to us it must be restored. We declare, also, in favour of absolute liberty of conscience, and complete separation of Church and State. We appeal to the Highest Tribunal for evidence of the justness of our cause. History bears testimony to the integrity of our sufferings, and we declare, in the face of our brethren, that we intend no war against the people of England – our war is against the aristocratic locusts, whether English or Irish, who have eaten the verdure of our fields – against the aristocratic leeches who drain alike our fields and theirs. Republicans of the entire world, our cause is your cause. Our enemy is your enemy. Let your hearts be with us. As for you, workmen of England, it is not only your hearts we wish, but your arms. Remember the starvation and degradation brought to your firesides by the oppression of labour. Remember the past, look well to the future, and avenge yourselves by giving liberty to your children in the coming struggle for human liberty. Herewith we proclaim the Irish Republic.

The Provisional Government.

The proclamation preceded the Easter 1916 Proclamation of the Irish Republic by almost 50 years. It also sheds some light on early Fenianism: it is centred on the ideas of republican democracy; however, it is embedded with ideas of class struggle. The proclamation claims that their war was "against the aristocratic locusts, whether English or Irish" which denotes that their ideology at this time was in some way embedded in class differences against the landed aristocracy rather than merely against British rule. In an attempt to bring arms and reinforcements from the United States, the Fenian ship Jacknell, renamed Erin's Hope, sailed from New York but did not reach Ireland until May 1867, well after the rising had collapsed, and eventually returned to America without landing its cargo.

== Aftermath ==
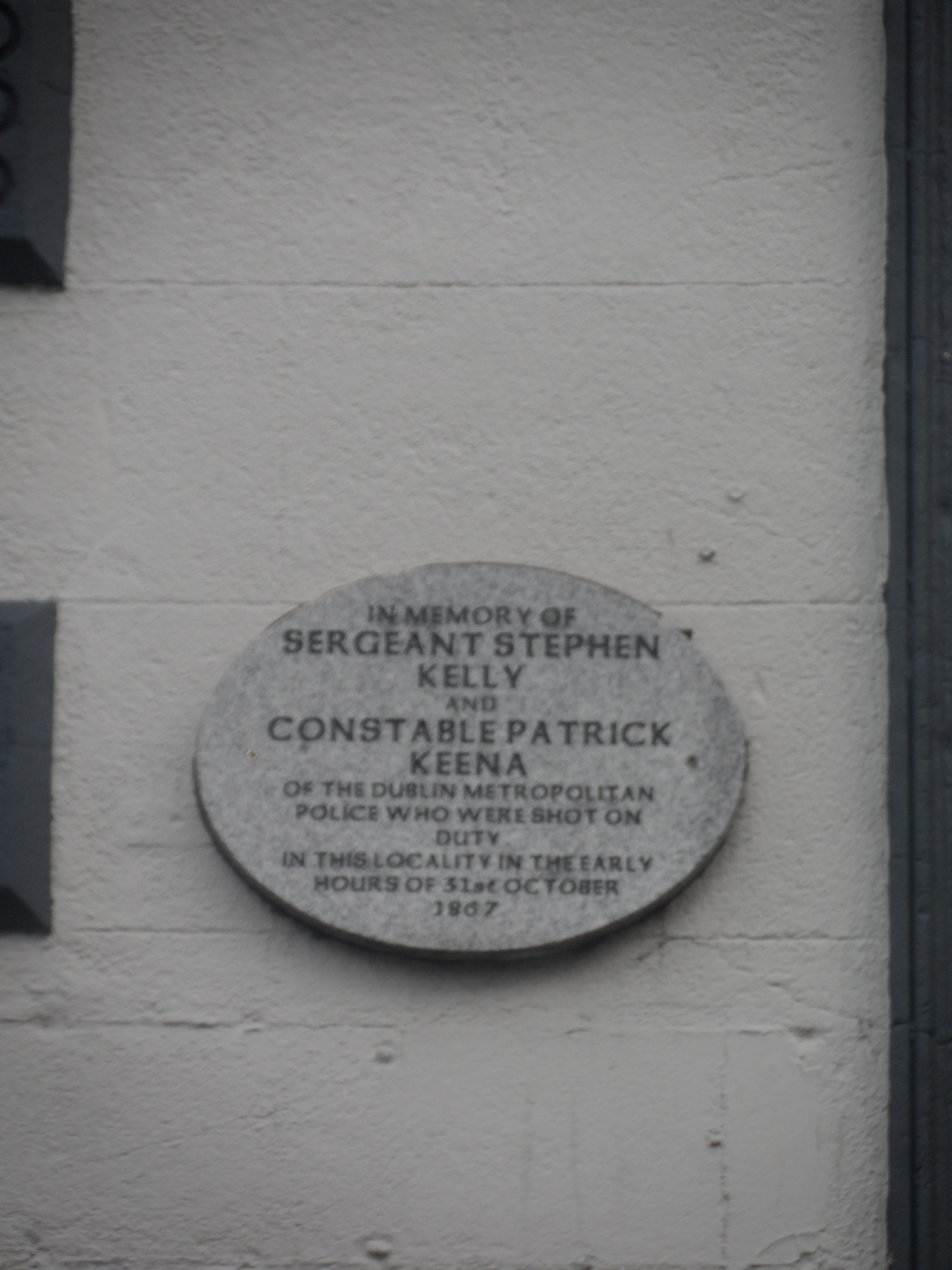
Plaque in Temple Bar, Dublin commemorating two Dublin Metropolitan Police officers, shot by a Fenian splinter group on Hallowe'en 1867

Between 8 April and 19 June 1867, 169 prisoners were tried before Special Commissions in Dublin, Cork and Limerick; the great majority, 110 men, pleaded guilty, fifty-two were convicted following jury trial and seven were acquitted, while eight, including McCafferty, were convicted of high treason and sentenced to death, sentences that were commuted not long afterwards. Patrick Doran, who had taken part in the Dundrum, Stepaside and Glencullen attacks, was tried alongside Colonel Thomas Francis Burke at Green Street courthouse on 28 April 1867; both men were sentenced to be hanged, drawn and quartered, reportedly the last such sentence imposed in British judicial history, before it was commuted to transportation for life. Doran was transported aboard the Hougoumont, which sailed for Fremantle on 12 October 1867 carrying 280 convicts, including 63 Fenians, among them the writer John Boyle O'Reilly; it was the last convict ship to leave Britain for the Australian penal colonies.

Colonel Fariola attempted to escape after the collapse of the rising, but was arrested in London and pleaded guilty before the November 1867 special commission in Dublin, on the advice of fellow prisoner General Halpin; given the choice of transportation to a British colony, he selected Australia. Massey's evidence as a Crown witness before the Special Commissions was central to a number of subsequent convictions, though contemporaries such as A. M. Sullivan and Cluseret took differing views of his motives, with Sullivan describing him as a man who, on discovering the conspiracy was already betrayed by others, concluded it was better that "the whole business was burst up" with the fewest possible casualties, rather than as a spy who had planned from the outset to inform.

On 11 September 1867, Colonel Thomas J. Kelly ("Deputy Central Organizer of the Irish Republic") was arrested in Manchester, where he had gone from Dublin to attend a council of the English "centres" (organisers), together with a companion, Captain Timothy Deasy. A plot to rescue these prisoners was hatched by Edward O'Meagher Condon with other Manchester Fenians; on 18 September, while Kelly and Deasy were being conveyed through the city from the courthouse, the prison van was attacked by Fenians armed with revolvers, and in the scuffle Police Sergeant Charles Brett, who was seated inside the van, was shot dead. Three Fenians who took part in the attempted rescue, William Philip Allen, Michael Larkin, and Michael O'Brien, were later executed, and are remembered as the "Manchester Martyrs." On the same day of November 1867, Ricard O'Sullivan Burke, who had been employed by the Fenians to purchase arms in Birmingham, was arrested and imprisoned in Clerkenwell Prison in London. In December, whilst he was awaiting trial a wall of the prison was blown down by gunpowder in order to effect his escape. The explosion caused the death of twelve people, and injured one hundred and twenty others. The Clerkenwell Outrage, for which Fenian Michael Barrett would suffer the death penalty, powerfully influenced William Ewart Gladstone in deciding that the Anglican Church of Ireland should be disestablished as a concession to Irish disaffection.

The Irish Times, writing on 7 March 1867, called the rising a failure and futile while praising those who fought against the Fenians as "gallant" and praised their "courage". The rising itself was a total military failure, but it did have some political benefits for the Fenian movement. There were large protests in Ireland against the execution of Fenian prisoners, many of whose death sentences were, as a result, reprieved. In addition, the bravery of the three "Manchester Martyrs" on their execution provoked an emotional reaction among the Irish public; 17 monuments were erected in their honour, and annual commemorations were held well into the 20th century. An Amnesty Association for Fenian prisoners was established by Isaac Butt, later the founder of the Home Rule League; Butt had also acted as defence counsel for many of the Fenian prisoners at the 1865–67 trials.

The Fenians themselves re-organised after the failure of the rising. In 1873, the Irish Republican Brotherhood adopted a new constitution, which stated that armed rebellion would not be pursued again until it had mass backing from the people. In 1879, the leaders of the IRB, principally John Devoy, decided on a New Departure, eschewing, for the time, physical force in favour of adopting the land question and building a broad nationalist movement. The Fenians, therefore, cooperated with the Land League in the land agitation from the 1870s onwards and in the rise of the Irish Parliamentary Party.

Not all Fenians agreed with this policy, however, and several breakaway groups emerged that continued to believe in the use of political violence in pursuit of republican objectives. One was the Irish National Invincibles who assassinated the two most important British functionaries in Ireland, Frederick Cavendish and Thomas Henry Burke, Chief and Under Secretaries for Ireland, respectively, in Dublin in 1882 (see Phoenix Park Murders). Two other factions, one sponsored by O'Donovan Rossa, the other by the Irish-American Clan na Gael, carried out a bombing campaign in Britain between 1880 and 1887.

The success of the Irish Constabulary in suppressing the rebellion, without the need to call in the Army, was rewarded by Queen Victoria who granted the force the prefix 'Royal' in 1867 and the right to use the insignia of the Most Illustrious Order of St Patrick in their motif.

Historian Shin-ichi Takagami has argued that, while the rising was not a serious military threat, the scale of the response on the night of 5–6 March, when many thousands of men turned out despite poor weather, poor organisation and the arrest of much of the leadership, demonstrated that the politicisation of the urban artisan class in Dublin, from which around 60 per cent of Dublin Fenians were drawn, had advanced considerably by 1867.

== Related conflicts ==
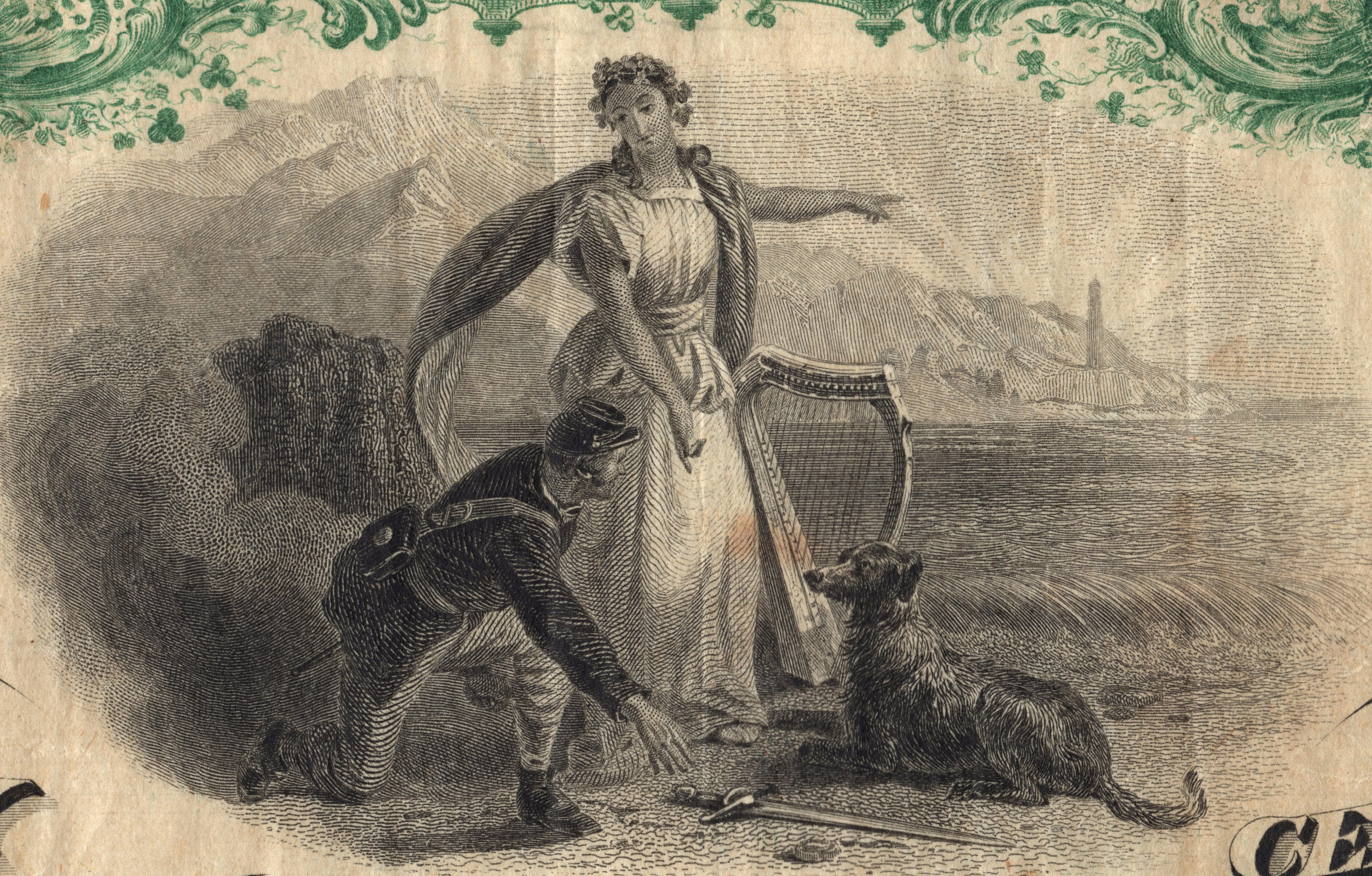
Image on Fenian Bond showing Erin instructing Civil War veteran to fight for his homeland across the ocean.

Map of major events during the Fenian Rising in Ireland and the UK, and the Fenian Raids in North America. Click the map to view a larger size.

The Fenian Brotherhood, especially a faction of it under William R. Roberts, mobilised up to 1,000 Irish veterans of the American Civil War to launch raids on British army forts, customs posts and other targets in Canada in order to bring pressure on Britain to withdraw from Ireland in 1866 and 1871. While the U.S. authorities arrested the men and confiscated their arms afterwards, there is speculation that many in the US government had turned a blind eye to the preparations for the invasion, angered at actions that could be construed as British assistance to the Confederacy during the American Civil War. There were five Fenian raids of note. While they had some minor successes against Canadian forces, they were militarily and politically unsuccessful.

== Commemorations ==
In Ardagh in Limerick there was a reenactment of the attack on Ardagh police barracks and a plaque was unveiled on the 150th anniversary of the rising. It was also commemorated in Nenagh.

=== In music ===
In 1865, Henry Wood wrote the words for and Henry Tucker wrote the music for a song called "When Fenians Fight for Freedom".

The folk song "The Galway Races" contains a reference to the residents of Cork City who "brought home the Fenian prisoners from diverse nations".

== See also ==
- Catalpa rescue
- Cuba Five
- Fenian Raids
- List of Irish uprisings
- List of monuments and memorials to the Fenian Rebellion

== Sources ==
- Domville Handcock, William (1877). The History and Antiquities of Tallaght in the County of Dublin (PDF). Dublin: Hodges, Figgis, & Co., Ltd., 104 Grafton Street.
