= All-Ireland Senior Club Camogie Championship 1996 =

Camogie championship

Winners
- Champions: Pearses (Galway) (1st title)
- Manager: Michael Kennedy
- Captain: Ann Forde

Runners-up
- Runners-up: Granagh-Ballingarry (Limerick)

The 1996 All-Ireland Senior Club Camogie Championship for the leading clubs in the women's team field sport of camogie was won by Pearses from the Ballymacward and Gurteen areas of Co Galway, who defeated Granagh-Ballingarry from Limerick in the final, played at Glen Rovers.

== Arrangements ==
The championship was organised on the traditional provincial system used in Gaelic Games since the 1880s, with Rathnure of Wexford and Leitrim Fontenoys of Down winning the championships of the other two provinces. The 14-year-old Eileen O'Brien, who had won All-Ireland Colleges senior and sevens medals earlier in the season, scored 11 points for Granagh-Ballingarry in the semi-final against Leitrim Fontenoys of Down.

== The Final ==
In the final, Eileen O'Brien, was restricted to two points by Aisling Ward, while Maureen Sheehan confined Sharon Glynn to four scores.

=== Final stages ===
September 1
Semi-Final

Pearses (Gal)	3-14 – 3-1	Rathnure (Wexford)

September 8
Semi-Final

Granagh-Ballingarry (Limerick)	2-15 – 0-8	Leitrim Fontenoys (Down)

November 24
Final

Pearses (Gal)	1-8 – 2-3	Granagh-Ballingarry (Limerick)

Glen Rovers

Pearses	Granagh-Ballingarry

Pearses (Gal):
GK	1	Louise Curry
FB	2	Aisling Ward
RWB	3	Colette Deeley
CB	4	Tracey Laheen]
LWB	5	Brigid Kilgallon
MF	6	Michelle Glynn
MF	7	Martina Harkin
MF	8	Carmel Hannon
RWF	9	Martina Haverty
CF	10	Sharon Glynn
LWF	11	Áine Hillary
FF	12	Anne Forde

Granagh-Ballingarry (Limerick):
GK	1	Breda O'Brien
FB	2	Patsy McKenna
RWB	3	Bernie O'Brien
CB	4	Maureen Sheehan
LWB	5	Ida Quaid
MF	6	Jean Cullinane
MF	7	Ber Chawke
MF	8	Deidre Sheehan
RWF	9	Kay Burke
CF	10	Vera Sheehan
LWF	11	Laura Leslie
FF	12	Eileen O'Brien

Preceded by All-Ireland Senior Club Camogie Championship 1995	All-Ireland Senior Club Camogie Championship; 1964 – present	Succeeded by All-Ireland Senior Club Camogie Championship 1997
