= Octave Fariola =

Belgian-born Soldier, Adventurer, Engineer

- Born: Octave Louis François Étienne Fariola; 30 May 1839; Liège, Belgium
- Died: 1914 (aged 74–75)
- Burial place: Arlington National Cemetery, Virginia (Section 2, grave 3590, McClellan Drive)
- Other names: Eugène Libert; Octave De Libert; Fariola de Rozzoli
- Education: Royal Military Academy, Brussels
- Spouses: Jeanne Neukind (m. 1861); Susan Elizabeth Frazer (m. 1888); Arundeng Aun (m. 1894)
- Children: 6, including Octavia, Laura Emilia Margarette, Octave Louis, Louis and Margarette
- Relatives: Kevin Rozzoli
- Military career
- Allegiance: Belgium (1857-1862); Union (1863-1866); Fenian Brotherhood (1866-1867)
- Branch: Belgian Army (Carabiniers); Union Army; Fenian forces
- Service years: 1857-1862 (Belgium); 1863-1866 (United States); 1866-1867 (Fenian Brotherhood)
- Rank: Lieutenant colonel
- Nicknames: "Frog-Eater"; General O'Fariola
- Unit: 96th United States Colored Infantry
- Commands: 96th United States Colored Infantry
- Conflicts: American Civil War; Siege of Fort Gaines; Siege of Fort Morgan; Battle of Mobile; Fenian Rising

Octave Louis François Étienne Fariola (30 May 1839 (Note: also given as 31 May 1839) – c. 1914), also known by the aliases Eugène Libert, General O'Fariola, Octave De Libert, and, from the mid-1870s onward, Fariola de Rozzoli, was a Belgian-born soldier, Union Army officer, and later farmer and civil engineer. He is best known for his service as lieutenant colonel of the 96th United States Colored Infantry during the American Civil War, and for his role as chief of staff of the rebel forces during the Fenian Rising of March 1867 in Ireland. Following the collapse of the rising he was imprisoned in Kilmainham Gaol and subsequently transported to Queensland, Australia, where he farmed under an assumed name before working as a surveyor in New South Wales and later as an engineer in the service of King Rama V of Siam. Genealogical research undertaken in the 2000s established that Fariola's claims to French, Italian and aristocratic descent, and to a Louisiana birth, were fabrications, and that he was in fact born into a bourgeois military family in Liège.

== Early life and family ==
Fariola was born in Liège, then part of Belgium, the son of Louis François Fariola, an army paymaster (officier payeur), and Marie Marguerite Octavie Libert. The civil status register of the city of Liège records his birth as having taken place at 11 pm on 30 May 1839, although a family tree compiled by genealogist Denise Dowdall gives the date as 31 May 1839.

His father, Louis François Fariola, was born in Locarno, in the Swiss canton of Ticino, on 8 March 1791, the son of Étienne Marie Jean Jacques Fariola and Josephine Babazzottini. Ticino was, at the time, an Italian-speaking canton that had briefly declared itself an autonomous republic under Napoleonic support. Louis François joined the Army of the Netherlands in 1816 and served for most of his career as a sergeant in the Battalion of Sappers and Miners, later transferring into the newly formed Belgian Army following Belgian independence in 1830. He appears among a list of naturalisation bills brought before the Belgian Chamber of Representatives in 1840. He was, like many military men of the period, a Freemason. He ended his career in 1846 as a sub-lieutenant and paymaster. Louis François Fariola died in Ixelles, Brussels, on 21 November 1852, when Octave was thirteen years old.

Fariola's mother, Marie Marguerite Octavie Libert, was a native of Liège, born there in 1807, and is described in contemporary records as a woman of independent means (rentière) of good reputation. The Libert family was long established in the Liège area.

== Education and Belgian military career ==
As was customary for the children of non-commissioned officers, Fariola was educated at the school of the Enfants de Troupe before entering the elite Royal Military Academy in Brussels, from which he graduated first in his class in 1857. He was commissioned as a lieutenant in the Carabiniers, one of Belgium's heavy cavalry regiments, and held that rank until his resignation from the Belgian army in October 1862.

Fariola later claimed to have served as a volunteer under Giuseppe Garibaldi during the Expedition of the Thousand at Marsala in Sicily in 1860, and described himself as one of Garibaldi's celebrated Redshirts. However, his surviving military file at the Royal Military Academy contains no record of any leave of absence from the Belgian army during this period. Researchers have questioned the veracity of the claim. Historian Daniel Frankignoul notes that Fariola gave differing and contradictory accounts of the episode over the years, including a 1909 newspaper interview in which he claimed his father, rather than he himself, had fled Italy after a conspiracy, a claim contradicted by other evidence.

On 15 October 1861, Fariola married Jeanne Catherine Philomène Neukind (also recorded as Neutkhens) at the Church of St Mary, Schaerbeek, Brussels. She was born in Brussels around 1845 and later died in Marseille in 1890. The couple's daughter, Octavia, was born in Paris in 1862.

== Emigration to the United States ==
After resigning his commission, Fariola spent several months in Paris before travelling to the United States. The passenger list of the SS City of New York records his and his wife Jeanne's arrival in New York on 27 July 1863; the couple gave their place of origin as Great Britain, and Fariola described his own occupation as "musician". He later claimed his purpose in travelling to America was to settle a family inheritance in Texas rather than to join the Union war effort, though genealogical searches found no trace of either the Fariola or Libert families having settled there.

== American Civil War service ==
Fariola was enrolled in the Union Army in New Orleans on 10 July 1863, having been recruited in New York by Brigadier General William Dwight, chief of staff to Major General Nathaniel P. Banks. He was commissioned as a captain in the Corps d'Afrique, following a general order of May 1863 to organise regiments of black troops for the Union Army. He subsequently commanded a company in the 77th United States Colored Infantry Regiment before being detached to Banks's staff as aide-de-camp in February 1864. On 1 March 1864 he was transferred to the newly redesignated 96th United States Colored Infantry, an engineering regiment, and was promoted to lieutenant colonel of that unit the same day, according to the Official Army Register. His claim to have taken part in the Red River campaign of March and April 1864 has been described by historian Daniel Frankignoul as doubtful.

The 96th was primarily an engineering outfit, tasked with building pontoon bridges, corduroy roads, field fortifications, and repairing piers and levees, and it suffered comparatively light casualties, though many of its men were affected by malaria. Fariola was not popular among the rank and file; his continental eating habits earned him the nickname "Frog-Eater" among fellow soldiers, according to the diary of Sergeant Matthew Woodruff of the 21st Missouri Infantry Regiment. He was, however, noted as an opponent of executing deserters, intervening on several occasions to seek clemency on the grounds that such killings were an unnecessary waste of life. He was also known to represent himself as a European nobleman: Henry Clay Warmoth, the future Governor of Louisiana, recorded in his diary an encounter with "the magnificent Count Fariola" in 1863.

From 30 April 1864, Fariola served for a time on the staff of Major General John A. McClernand and reportedly as chief engineer of the XII Army Corps, before returning to the 96th. He took part in the sieges of Fort Gaines and Fort Morgan during the Battle of Mobile Bay in August 1864, and in the capture of Mobile on 12 April 1865, and assumed command of the regiment following the resignation or dismissal of its two preceding colonels. The regiment was demobilised on 29 January 1866 at Carrollton, Louisiana.

Following his discharge, Fariola briefly attempted cotton planting in Louisiana in 1866 but abandoned the venture as unsuccessful after a single year, after which he returned to Europe and again resided in Paris.

== Fenian involvement ==
=== Recruitment and preparations ===
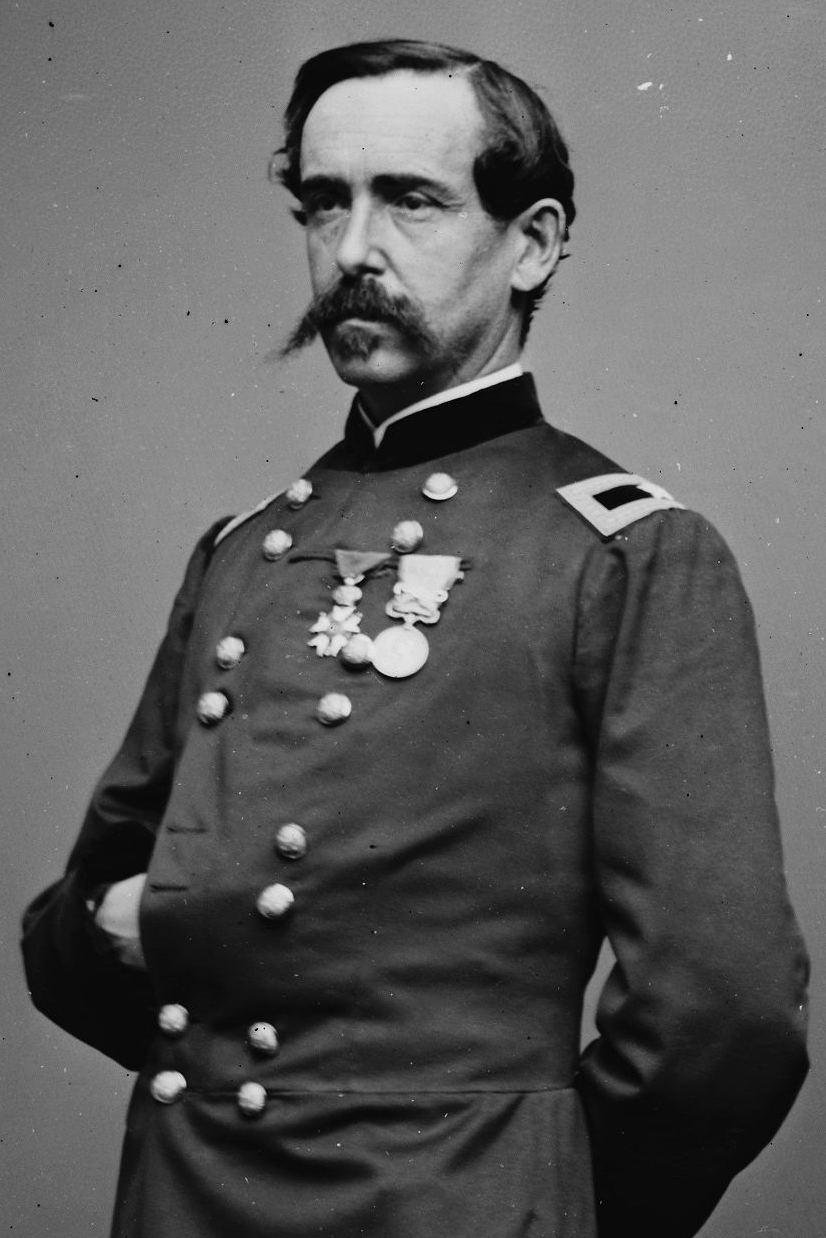
Gustave Cluseret

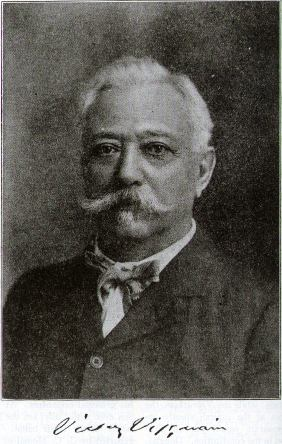
Victor Vifquain

Fariola worked alongside fellow Francophones Cluseret and Vifquain to aid the Fenian Republicans in Ireland

The Fenian Brotherhood, which had grown out of the United Irish tradition, sought to exploit the military experience of Irish-American veterans of the Civil War to organise an armed rising in Ireland. Among those recruited were three French-speaking soldiers of fortune: Gustave Cluseret, Victor Vifquain, and Fariola. According to historian Peter Nolan's 1970 account, Fariola was introduced to Fenian leader James Stephens by Colonel Thomas J. Kelly, and Stephens offered the overall military command of the projected rising to Cluseret, who accepted on condition he be supplied with 10,000 armed men; Cluseret in turn offered Fariola the position of second-in-command.

Fariola was reportedly to be paid £30 per month rising to £60 per month once active operations began, according to his own later account, although Frankignoul states the agreed rate was £60 a month paid six months in advance. Fariola later wrote that both he and Cluseret were motivated chiefly by republican conviction rather than financial reward, and that he had undertaken the venture only on condition that the rising be "thoroughly republican and democratic".

He left New York on the SS England on 14 November 1866, narrowly avoided arrest on arriving in Liverpool, and travelled on to Paris via London, arriving on 3 December 1866. Finding no funds waiting for him, he was obliged to borrow money from his wife's family and to pawn his watch. He was given six weeks to organise the initial stage of the rising, to study Ireland topographically and socially, and to become familiar with British military dispositions. Fariola's Irish contact, William O'Donovan, proved unable to supply the promised funds, and Stephens, distracted by a leadership contest within the American wing of the movement, largely neglected his emissary in Paris during this period.

Fariola was formally confirmed as chief of staff, with the title of adjutant general of the Irish Republic, when a provisional government was established in early 1867 under Colonel Kelly, with Cluseret confirmed as commander-in-chief. Fariola set out his own views on how the rising should be conducted, advocating an initial phase of irregular guerrilla warfare, in which small, mobile bands of fifteen to twenty men would avoid pitched battles and instead harass police and troops, cut communications, and wear down government forces, before a second, more conventional phase once international recognition of belligerent status had been secured.

=== The March 1867 rising ===
Recreation of one of the Fenian Flags used during the 1867 Rebellion

The rising was fixed for the night of Shrove Tuesday, 5 March 1867. Fariola travelled to Ireland alongside 'General' Godfrey Massey, the Fenians' deputy commander-in-chief, reaching Cork on 1 March. Fariola later wrote that he was astonished to discover Massey had, during a preliminary tour of the country, disregarded his instructions and instead devised a rival plan calling for large, poorly armed bodies of men to march on and besiege Limerick city, a strategy Fariola considered wholly impractical given the state of Fenian preparedness. Fariola was unable to make contact with Massey until 2 March, too late to effectively countermand the change of plan.

The rising that followed on the night of 5 March was, in consequence, largely disorganised: Connacht failed to rise at all for want of a military commander, the group intended to march from Cork dispersed without direction, and while a number of local engagements were fought successfully, including attacks on police barracks at Ballyknockane and Tallaght, the various Fenian bands generally scattered without any plan for regrouping once government forces appeared. On the evening of 4 March, before the rising had even begun, Massey was arrested by police at Limerick Junction and shortly afterward agreed to turn Queen's evidence, further compromising the rebellion. Nolan's 1970 analysis, drawing extensively on Fariola's own contemporaneous letters, concludes that Massey's interference with the original plan, whether attributable to incompetence or prior treachery, was principally responsible for the rising's failure, a reading Nolan notes is corroborated by Kelly's own subsequent correspondence.

=== Arrest and Kilmainham Gaol ===
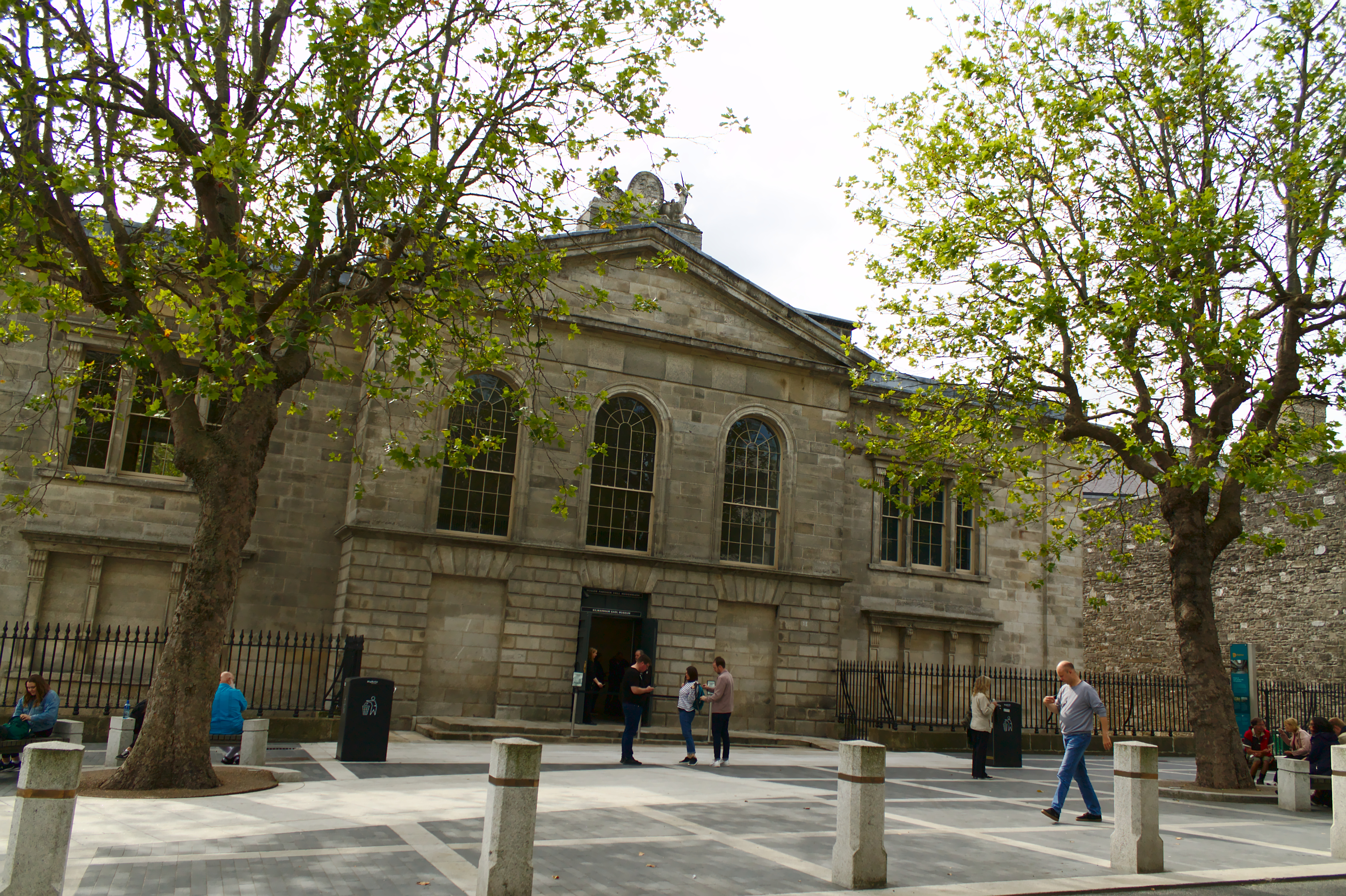
Exterior of Kilmainham Gaol.

Following the collapse of the rising, Fariola made his way to Limerick Junction on the evening of 5 March, posing as a reporter for the Paris newspaper Liberté, before travelling on to Dublin, London, and Paris. He subsequently returned, "foolishly" in Nolan's phrase, to London, where he was arrested by Scotland Yard on Oxford Street. Contemporary newspaper accounts and Nolan's later research place this arrest in July 1867, roughly four months after the rising, and he was conveyed to Kilmainham Gaol shortly afterward. Frankignoul, by contrast, gives the arrest date as 14 October 1867.

The Kilmainham prison register recorded the prisoner, aged 29, as "Octave Fariola, alias Eugene Libert, otherwise General O'Fariola, born Louisiana, occupation planter", held on a charge of treason. Contemporary newspapers described his appearance as "sinister" and emphasised his supposed links to Italian revolutionary circles associated with Giuseppe Mazzini and Garibaldi. At his arraignment Fariola affected to speak little English and gave his name as the Germanic-sounding "Liebehrt" or "Lieberth", a variant of his mother's maiden name, Libert. According to Dowdall, the title "O'Fariola" arose after a barrister mistakenly assumed the name to be an Italianised form of the Irish surname O'Farrell; Frankignoul similarly notes the "O." had in fact simply stood for "Octave".

Fariola's case was handled by Richard Bourke, 6th Earl of Mayo, then Chief Secretary for Ireland, whose papers show that Fariola had been arrested on information supplied by a paid informer for £100. William Fielding, head of the British secret police, urged that the prisoner be "led very gently", assessing him as likely to turn informer out of resentment at having been made a fool of by the Fenians, while also believing him to be a Carbonaro, a member of the radical Italian secret society formed in the 1820s in opposition to Austrian rule, whose life would be endangered should this cooperation become known.

While imprisoned, Fariola wrote an account of his experiences for the newspaper The Irishman, published in instalments between 1 August and 24 October 1868, referring to his six months' detention as his "Via Dolorosa". He complained bitterly of the prison chaplain's efforts to reform him and accused the prison governor, Henry Price, of parading high-profile prisoners for the entertainment of visitors. In the same account he insisted upon his Swiss nationality, claimed his forefathers had held the title of count, described his mother's family as "Celto-Belgic" and partly settled in Texas, and stated that an uncle of his had been a bishop and confidant of Pope Gregory XVI; none of these claims have been substantiated by subsequent genealogical research.

Fariola pleaded guilty before the November 1867 special commission in Dublin, on the advice of fellow prisoner General William Halpin, and was given the choice of transportation to a British colony, selecting Australia. He was released on 20 December 1867, and a receipt survives in his hand acknowledging £35 from Lord Mayo, apparently to cover the cost of his passage. Richard Pigott opened a subscription fund in The Irishman for the support of Fariola's wife and child during his imprisonment, though the response was reportedly poor.

== Life in Australia ==
=== Magnolia Plantation, Queensland ===
Fariola arrived in Australia in early 1868 and settled in Queensland under the name Octave De Libert, apparently to distance himself from his recent notoriety. In partnership with the Hon. William Fielding (unrelated to the London secret police official of the same name), he managed the 3,000-acre Magnolia Plantation near Maryborough. He was a member of the local Acclimatization Society and, according to the Brisbane Courier, was the first grower in the province to crush sugar cane during winter and the first to successfully cultivate fruit-bearing olive trees. After roughly a decade the plantation reportedly boasted 250 acres of cane, described as the best in the province, alongside orchards of lemon, orange and peach trees and half a mile of passion fruit vines, although contemporary accounts suggest the enterprise was never profitable.

=== Divorce and the adoption of the "Rozzoli" name ===
In early 1874 Fariola's wife, Jeanne Neukind, filed for divorce on grounds of adultery and cruelty. The case, De Libert v. De Libert, was heard before three of Queensland's senior judges, including Chief Justice Sir James Cockle, with Fariola representing himself. The divorce writ revealed that the couple's 1861 marriage in Schaerbeek had taken place when the bride was just sixteen, rendering the ceremony potentially invalid, and that a second marriage was said to have followed the birth of their daughter Octavia in late 1862. The daughter, then twelve, was called to testify on her mother's behalf but instead described her father as consistently kind and loving. The case was dropped at the end of 1874.

Fariola reopened the matter in 1875, this time suing his wife's alleged lover for £2,000 in damages, and it was at this point that he began using the name Don Octavius Louis Francis Stephen Fariola dei Rozzoli de Libert, the first recorded appearance of the surname "Rozzoli", which he retained for the rest of his life. The suit was dismissed after the presiding judge found that Fariola was colluding with his estranged wife to secure a divorce and a financial settlement, and further noted that Fariola had himself committed adultery repeatedly during the period in question. Jeanne Neukind subsequently returned to Europe and died in Marseille in 1890.

Denise Dowdall's surname research concluded that "Fariola" and "Rozzoli" (more properly "Rizzoli") are Italian toponymic surnames rather than Belgian ones, most likely derived from villages near Lake Maggiore close to the Swiss border, consistent with the elder Fariola's birthplace of Locarno. Neither name appears in the Titled Nobility of Europe, a finding Dowdall states tends to refute Fariola's repeated claims to an aristocratic lineage.

=== Later career in Australia and New Zealand ===
Fariola appears to have given up farming around 1877, a period that coincided with the arrival of a destructive fungus in the sugar crops of the Wide Bay district. Trading as Frank S. Fariola de Rozzoli, he took out a licence as a surveyor under the Crown Lands Alienation Act 1876 and worked in that profession, based variously in Sydney and Melbourne, for close to twenty years. In 1889 he registered an engineering consultancy on Swanston Street, Melbourne, presenting himself as a former officer of the 77th and 96th United States Colored Infantry regiments, and he was involved in railway construction work; a street in the Silverwater area of Sydney, Fariola Street, is said to bear his name. He also advertised a written account of his role in the Fenian rebellion for sale in the Freeman's Journal in 1879, although no surviving copy has been located.

In the 1880s Fariola was named as the father of two children by Susan Elizabeth Frazer, and a marriage licence between the couple was recorded in the New South Wales civil indexes for 1888. Historian Daniel Frankignoul records the children as Laura Emilia Margarette, born 1882, and Octave Louis, born 1884, both born several years before the couple's marriage. Fariola subsequently spent a year working in New Zealand and a further four years in Borneo as a civil engineer.

== Career in Siam ==
In the 1890s Fariola travelled to Siam, where his arrival coincided with the reign of the reforming King Chulalongkorn (Rama V), who favoured the employment of European engineers in his modernisation of Bangkok. Fariola was appointed engineer-in-chief responsible for the city's sewage and water systems, conducted geodesic surveys, and worked alongside the royal confidant Phraya Thewetwongwiwat on improvements to drainage and waste collection. In association with the Italian engineer Carlo Allegri, he redrew the map of Bangkok, dividing the city into zones centred on the royal palace.

In October 1894 Fariola married Arundeng Aun under Siamese law; the couple had two children, Louis, born in 1897, and Margarette, born in 1901, both in Bangkok. Margarette later travelled to New York in 1922, using her father's American citizenship to gain entry to the United States, according to surviving shipping records.

== Return to the United States and death ==
Fariola returned to the United States in September 1904. He taught briefly at Mount Saint Joseph High School, a private college in Baltimore, before being hospitalised in February 1905 at the National Soldiers' Home in Hampton, Virginia, suffering from chronic illness. On the strength of his war record, the United States Congress voted in 1907 to increase his military pension from $12 to $30 a month. Contemporary pension records describe him as five feet six and a half inches tall, with almost white hair and a "bilious sanguine" complexion, and note that he was by this time incapable of manual labour.

The 1910 United States census recorded Fariola as a boarder in a home for widows in Washington, D.C., where he described himself as a widower whose second marriage had lasted fifteen years, and gave his occupation as civil engineer in government employ. He left the National Soldiers' Home in January 1912, and in July 1913, at the age of seventy-four, applied for a passport to travel abroad for two or three years. He appears to have sailed for Italy and booked a return passage from Palermo aboard the SS Re d'Italia roughly a year later; a heavy line drawn through his name on the ship's manifest suggests he either did not board the vessel or died during the crossing, and it has been speculated that the trip was intended to revisit sites associated with his claimed service under Garibaldi.

Accounts of Fariola's death are inconsistent. Some sources state that he died in Italy in 1914, having last resided on Via Giovanni Meli in Palermo, while other documents record his death as having occurred in Jersey City, New Jersey, on 17 September 1914. He was buried, with the cost of his funeral borne by the charitable Military Order of the Loyal Legion of the United States (MOLLUS), in Arlington National Cemetery, Virginia, along McClellan Drive, Section 2, grave 3590, as he was by that time believed to have no surviving friends or known family. His headstone is inscribed "Lt. Col. O. L. Fariola de Rozzoli, U.S.C.T."

== Personal life ==
Fariola was married at least three times: to Jeanne Catherine Philomène Neukind in Brussels in 1861; to Arundeng Aun under Siamese law in 1894; and, according to New South Wales records, to Susan Elizabeth Frazer in 1888, though the exact status of his divorce from Neukind was never conclusively established. He is recorded as having fathered six children across these relationships: Octavia (b. 1862) and Emilia Jane Margaret Laura (b. 1873, died in infancy) with Neukind; Laura Emilia Margarette (b. 1882) and Octave Louis (b. 1884) with Frazer; and Louis (b. 1897) and Margarette (b. 1901) with Arundeng Aun.

== Legacy ==
Writing in 1970, historian Peter Nolan described Fariola's contemporary accounts of the 1867 rising, published in The Irishman, as forming "the main basis" for reconstructing the disputed course of events that led to the rebellion's failure, and credited Fariola's testimony as being substantially corroborated by the later correspondence of Colonel Kelly. Historian Robert Kee characterised Fariola as one of the "shadowy figures whose lives flicker momentarily across the brief scene of the Fenian Rising".

Genealogist Denise Dowdall concluded that, notwithstanding Fariola's repeated claims to aristocratic and Italian noble ancestry, his origins were "solidly bourgeois", and suggested that his invented aristocratic background and American birthplace were most likely deployed strategically, including as an attempt to secure leniency at his 1867 trial. Daniel Frankignoul, of the Confederate Historical Association of Belgium, characterised Fariola as a "mythomaniac" on the basis of the numerous, often contradictory, identities and life stories he presented over the course of his career, including his claimed noble title, his supposed Louisiana birth, and his disputed service under Garibaldi.

A descendant, the Hon. Kevin Rozzoli, a member of the New South Wales Legislative Assembly for Hawkesbury, stated in an interview with the Hawkesbury Gazette in 2003 that he believed himself descended from "an old aristocratic Italian family" through Fariola, and was reported to be writing a biography of his ancestor.
