= Edwin R. Meade =

American politician

Edwin Meade
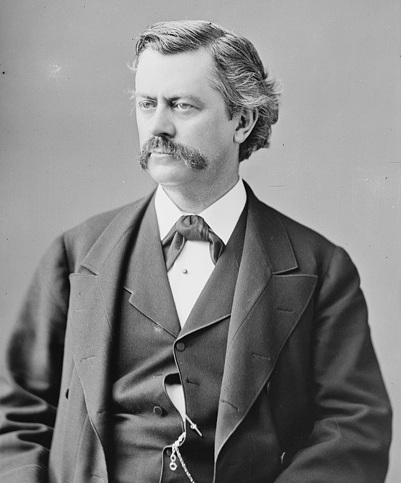

Member of the U.S. House of Representatives from New York's 5th district
- In office March 4, 1875 – March 3, 1877
- Preceded by: William R. Roberts
- Succeeded by: Nicholas Muller

Personal details
- Born: July 6, 1836 Norwich, New York, U.S.
- Died: November 28, 1889 (aged 53) New York City, U.S.
- Resting place: Greene Cemetery, Greene, New York
- Party: Democratic Party

Edwin Ruthven Meade (July 6, 1836 – November 28, 1889) was an American lawyer and politician who served one term as a U.S. representative from New York from 1875 to 1877.

== Biography ==
Born in Norwich, New York, Meade pursued an academic course. He studied law. He was admitted to the bar in 1858 and commenced practice in Norwich, New York. He moved to New York City in 1872 and continued the practice of law.

=== Congress ===
Meade was elected as a Democrat to the Forty-fourth Congress (March 4, 1875 – March 3, 1877). He was not a candidate for reelection in 1876.

=== Later career and death ===
He resumed the practice of his profession. He died in New York City November 28, 1889. He was interred in Greene Cemetery, Greene, New York.

U.S. House of Representatives
Preceded by William R. Roberts	Member of the U.S. House of Representatives from New York's 5th congressional district 1875–1877	Succeeded by Nicholas Muller
