= Thomas Francis Bourke =

Irish soldier (1840–1889)

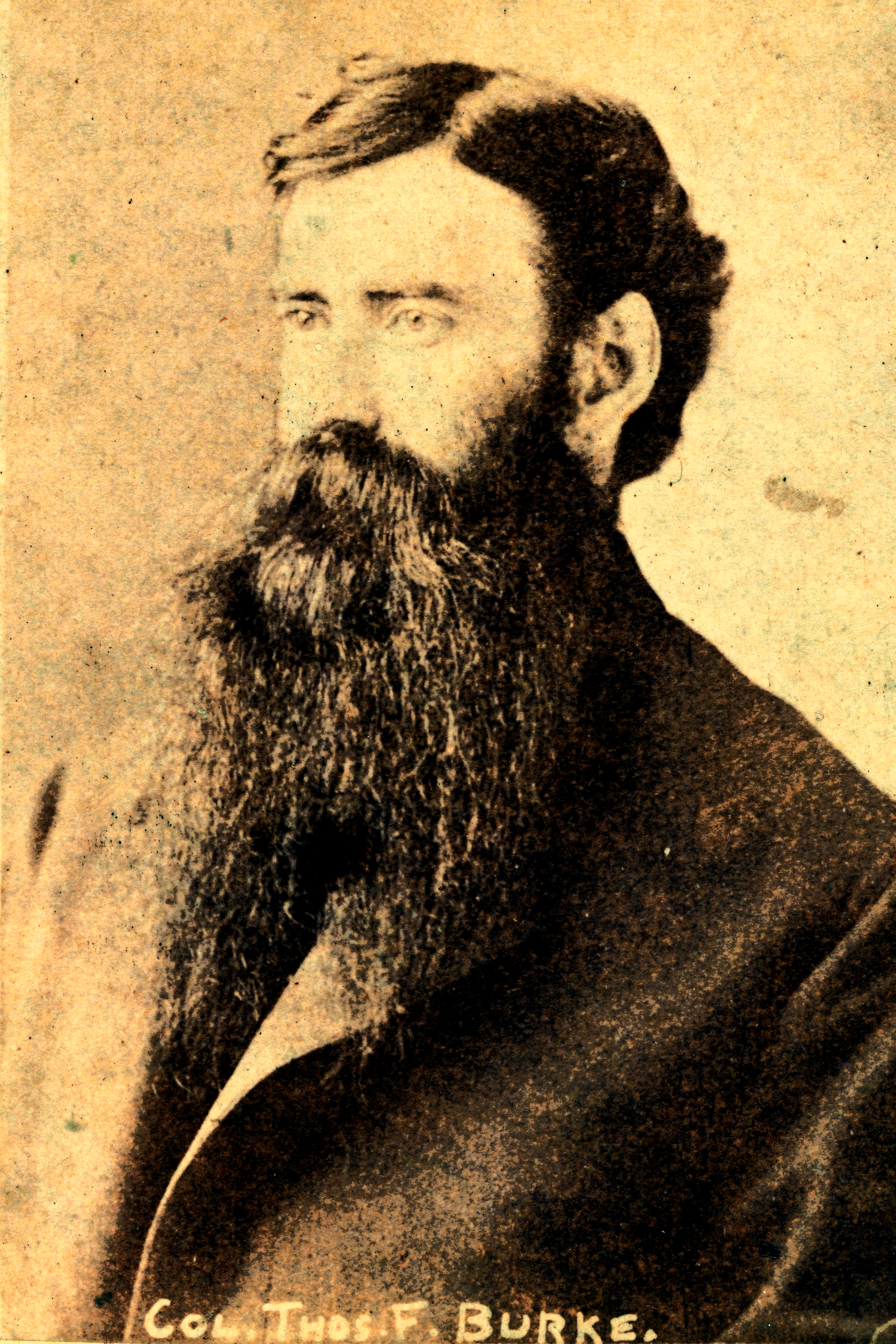
- Born: December 10, 1840; Fethard, County Tipperary, Ireland
- Died: November 10, 1889 (aged 48); 209 East 36th Street, Manhattan, New York City
- Burial place: Calvary Cemetery, Queens, New York City
- Military career
- Allegiance: Confederate States of America; Irish Republican Brotherhood; Fenian Brotherhood
- Branch: Confederate States Army
- Rank: Colonel (Fenians)
- Unit: 7th Louisiana infantry
- Conflicts: American Civil War; Capture of New Orleans; Jackson's Valley campaign; Battle of Antietam; Second Battle of Fredericksburg; Gettysburg campaign; Battle of Gettysburg (WIA) (POW); Fenian Rising of 1867

Thomas Francis Bourke (sometimes also spelt as Burke) (10 December 1840 - 10 November 1889) was an Irish soldier who fought in the American Civil War on behalf of the Confederacy and who was later a member of the Fenian Brotherhood, a revolutionary organisation linked to the Irish Republican Brotherhood that sought to establish an independent Irish Republic separate from the United Kingdom. He took part in the Fenian Rising of 1867, and was initially sentenced to death for his role in it. His sentence was later commuted before he was released as part of a general amnesty, conditional on going into exile.

== Biography ==
=== Early life and repeated immigration ===
Thomas Francis Bourke was born 10 December 1840 in Fethard, County Tipperary, Ireland. He was the second eldest of six children of Edmond Burke, a house painter, and Mary Burke (née Dwyer). In the 1840s Bourke's father had a relatively successful business, however, the events of Irish famine between 1845 and 1852 meant that the family was forced to emigrate in 1850. The family first settled in New York City in the United States, where Bourke's father once again operated as a painter. However, over the course of the next few years' Bourke's mother's health began to fail and on a Doctor's advice that she needed a colder climate, the family once again moved, this time to St. John's in Newfoundland. Edmond Burke was once again able to establish a successful business, but soon he too was encountering health problems (possibly due to lead poisoning) and the family was once again forced to resettle, this time in Toronto. By this point Thomas became the primary income earner for the family, working as a painter himself. Thomas would move to Boston, but following the panic of 1857, he was forced to live a nomadic lifestyle, travelling from one American city to another in search of work. Edmond Burke died in 1859, at which point the family returned to living in New York City. Thomas continued to pay for his family's expenses until his sibling came of age in the 1860s.

=== Fighting in the Confederate Army ===
Bourke found himself working in New Orleans, Louisiana upon the outbreak of the American Civil War in 1861. Bourke joined the Confederate States Army in April 1862, as would 40,000 fellow Irish immigrants, possibly as conscripts, adventurers, ideological supporters, or simply for money; Bourke would serve in the 7th Louisiana infantry regiment.

As part of the 7th Louisiana, Bourke fought with Confederates in the doomed defence of New Orleans from the Union Army in the Spring of 1862. Despite the defeat, Bourke remained with the 7th, and served under General Stonewall Jackson during his successful Valley campaign. In September 1862 the 7th fought at the Battle of Antietam, the deadliest one-day battle of the entire war. Bourke was lucky to survive the battle which saw 50% of his regiment killed in action. The 7th continued to fight despite their losses and participated in the Second Battle of Fredericksburg in May 1863.

==== Permanently wounded at Gettysburg ====
The 7th Louisiana were part of Robert E. Lee's Gettysburg campaign and they fought at the vicious Battle of Gettysburg. It was there, on 3 July, that Bourke (possibly during early morning assault on Culps Hill) was shot twice through the same leg, in the upper thigh. Bourke was brought to a Union Army hospital that did what they could for him, but his leg was permanently destroyed by his wounds as the muscle atrophied until there was little more than skin covering the bone. For the remainder of the war, Bourke was held as a prisoner of war at Fort Delaware, where his wound and the appalling conditions therein took a heavy toll on his health.

=== Fenianism ===
Following the end of the war in 1865, Bourke returned to New York City, reuniting with his family and returning to the painting profession, becoming a foreman in one of the city's largest painting firms. In June 1865 Bourke became a member of the Fenian Brotherhood, the American wing of the Irish Republican Brotherhood. Both organisations' aim was the creation of an independent Irish Republic, separate from the United Kingdom, achieved by violence if necessary. Bourke was amongst numerous Irish veterans of the Civil War who swelled the ranks of the Fenian Brotherhood at the conclusion of the war. Bourke was joined in the Fenians by his brothers James and Edward Bourke. Thomas Francis, who was considered a warm and courteous person by his peers in the Fenians (a considerable distinction in an organisation plagued by infighting), was appointed as head of the Fenians in Manhattan. As "Head Centre" of Manhattan, he was considered to be the Fenian equivalent of a colonel, and from there on out, Bourke would refer to himself as "Colonel Thomas Francis Bourke".

At the Fenian Convention in Philadelphia in October 1865, a split occurred amongst the Fenians which pitted Fenian President John O'Mahony, who favoured the Fenians dedicating themselves to a rebellion in Ireland, against William R. Roberts, who favoured the Fenians invading and capturing parts of Canada, which would then be held to ransom against the British Empire. Bourke sided with O'Mahoney, believing an invasion of Canada was doomed to failure. Nonetheless, Roberts' faction seized control of the Fenians at the convention, paving the way for the Fenian Raids of Canada.

In May 1866, following his escape from prison back in Ireland, the President of the IRB James Stephens arrived in New York City. Stephens attempted to reassert control over the American Fenians and made Colonel Thomas J. Kelly his deputy. Both Stephens and Kelly pushed for the Fenians to focus on an immediate rebellion in Ireland.

==== 1867 Rebellion ====
A flag flown by Fenians during the 1867 rebellion

In January 1867, Bourke, alongside many other Irish-American Fenians, sailed from New York to London, with the aim of taking part in a rebellion in Ireland that spring. Bourke convened in London with Fenian commanders Thomas J. Kelly, Gustave Paul Cluseret, and Godfrey Massey. Bourke was updated of their plans and assigned to Tipperary as his area of control for the rebellion. Bourke arrived in Ireland on February 8. Bourke's hopes of actually achieving a successful rebellion were doubtful, with the Fenians hopelessly divided between whether to attack Ireland or Canada, but nonetheless, Bourke was amongst those who felt honour-bound to attempt a rebellion in his native land. The original date for Stephens' planned uprising in Ireland was 11 February, but this was postponed due to British awareness of the plan. On 18 February Bourke was interviewed by the police in Clonmel.

The Fenian Rising of 1867 eventually started in early March but proved almost immediately a disaster. The rising was poorly organised, not well supported or armed, and most of the American contingent (who were planned to act as officers) were intercepted at sea by the British. Bourke, for his part, assembled a group of local Fenians at Kilfeakle, County Tipperary, before marching to Bansha, seizing arms on the way. At Bansha they cut the telegraph wires and tore up some railway tracks before proceeding to Ballyhurst Fort, where they were confronted by members of the 31st (Huntingdonshire) Regiment of Foot. Bourke's untrained and ill-armed men were quickly routed and Bourke himself was injured in a fall from his horse and captured.

==== Trial, Death sentence, Imprisonment ====
I have ties to bind me to life and society, as strong as any man in this court. I have a family I love as much as any man in this court does his. But I can remember the blessing received from an aged mother's lips, as I left her the last time. She spoke as the Spartan mother did—" Go, my boy. Return either with your shield or upon it." This reconciles me. This gives me heart. I submit to my doom, and I hope that God will forgive me my past sins. I hope, too, that inasmuch as He has for seven hundred years, preserved Ireland, notwithstanding all the tyranny to which she has been subjected, as a separate and distinct nationality, He will also retrieve her fallen fortunes—to rise in her beauty and her majesty, the sister of Columbia, the peer of any nation in the world

— Except of Bourke speaking at his trial

Having been held in Kilmainham Jail in Dublin, Bourke was put on trial for high treason in April 1867 and sentenced to death. For the trial, the Judges were The Chief Justice James Whiteside, Mr. Justice John Fitzgerald, and Baron Deasy, while Isaac Butt, Richard Dowse and Michael O'Loghlen served as Bourke's legal counsel. During the trial, Bourke made a number of speeches in which he acknowledged the rebellion was doomed to failure, but nonetheless, he was proud to die for Ireland. Nationalists in Ireland extolled Bourke's speeches as the most courageous heard in Ireland since those of Robert Emmett's, and even Bourke's opponents acknowledged his bravery in the face of death. Bourke was sentenced to die on 29 May 1867, however a public campaign for reprieve began almost immediately, culminating in a mass meeting at Dublin's Mansion House on 13 May. Despite this, the British were reticent to grant any clemency. However, following direct appeals from US President Andrew Johnson and Cardinal Paul Cullen, they acquiesced to commuting Bourke's sentence to penal servitude for life on 27 May.

Bourke served his sentence in Mountjoy Prison until 4 July 1867, when he was transferred to Millbank prison, London, and to Woking prison, Surrey, on 27 February 1868. In 1870 Bourke was interviewed by the Commission of inquiry on prison conditions, and he submitted a report detailing the suffering of his fellow Fenian inmate Ricard O'Sullivan Burke at Woking.

=== Release and later life ===
On 13 January 1871 Bourke was released from prison as part of a general amnesty for the Fenians, which mostly rested on an agreement that the Fenians would go into exile and not reside in Ireland or Great Britain. Bourke returned home to New York City. Once home, Bourke became a celebrity amongst the Irish-Americans alongside the also returning Cuba Five. Together, the six Fenians attended a number of events and engagements held in their honour, where the charismatic Bourke was normally nominated as lead speaker. This even included a visit by the six Fenians to the White House, where they spoke with US President Ulysses S. Grant on 22 February 1871.

Once settled back in America, Bourke, alongside Thomas Clarke Luby and O'Donovan Rossa, attempted to heal the rifts in American Fenanism by touring, lecturing and speaking to Fenians across the nation. Although Bourke was widely regarded as an able peacemaker and even a possible leader of the Fenians, the task remained daunting.

In 1872 Bourke stood for the position of Sheriff of Brooklyn, however, he was opposed by Tammany Hall and lost. Nonetheless, afterwards, Bourke was appointed deputy sheriff and clerk of supply in the department of public works in New York, a position he held until his death.

By 1874 it became apparent to Bourke and his allies that the Fenian Brotherhood could not be repaired, and so they switched their allegiance to Clan na Gael. Bourke was appointed a trustee of the Clan's "skirmishing fund" in spring 1877, but he quickly came to oppose O'Donovan Rossa's plan to use the skirmishing fund for a "Dynamite Campaign" to be waged in Great Britain, which Bourke denounced as "foolish and immoral". Against Bourke's wishes, the Fenian dynamite campaign would commence in 1881.

In January 1880 Bourke sat on the New York reception committee for C. S. Parnell and John Dillon and was an enthusiastic supporter of the "New Departure" (in which the insurrectionary Fenians agreed to work with the constitutionalists of the Irish Parliamentary Party) and the Land League, which fought for the rights of poor tenant farmers in Ireland.

After a short bout of acute inflammation of the kidneys, Bourke died on 10 November 1889 at his home at 209 East 36th Street, New York City. His funeral was held at St. Gabriel's and he was buried in Calvary Cemetery, Queens; he never married.
