= William R. Roberts =

American politician

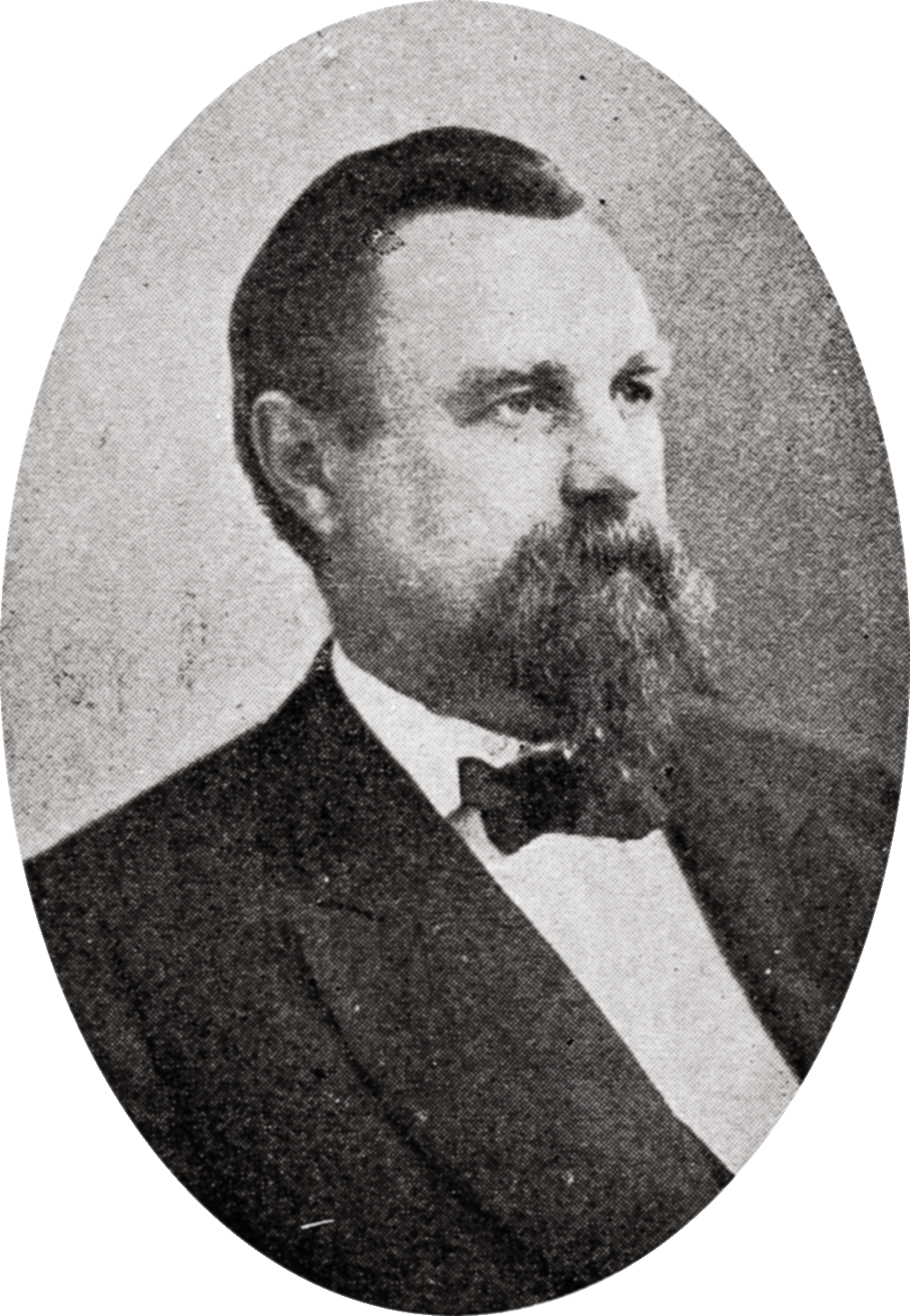

Member of the U.S. House of Representatives from New York's 5th district
- In office March 4, 1871 – March 3, 1875
- Preceded by: John Morrissey
- Succeeded by: Edwin R. Meade

United States Ambassador to Chile
- In office July 4, 1885 – August 9, 1889
- President: Grover Cleveland
- Preceded by: Cornelius Ambrose Logan
- Succeeded by: Patrick Egan

Personal details
- Born: William Randall Roberts; February 6, 1830 Mitchelstown, County Cork, Ireland
- Died: August 9, 1897 (aged 67) New York City, New York, U.S.
- Resting place: Calvary Cemetery, Queens, New York City

William Randall Roberts (February 6, 1830 – August 9, 1897) was an Irish-born American businessman, Fenian Brotherhood leader, two-term congressman from New York (1871 to 1875), and United States ambassador to Chile.

Born in Mitchelstown, County Cork, he emigrated to the United States in 1849 and built a successful career in the New York dry goods trade.

Roberts became a leading figure in the Fenian Brotherhood, the American support wing of the Irish Republican Brotherhood, joining in 1863 and rising to prominence as an orator and financial backer of the movement. He led the "Senate" faction that deposed founder John O'Mahony in late 1865, and championed a strategy of invading Canada rather than staging an immediate rising in Ireland, on the theory that a captured Canadian foothold could be used to force British concessions or provoke a diversion of imperial military resources. He took part in the 1866 Fenian raid into Canada, was briefly arrested and imprisoned in New York as a result, and later addressed the US Senate seeking amnesty for Fenian prisoners held in Ireland. He resigned his Fenian leadership at the end of 1867 and gradually withdrew from revolutionary activity over the following years, though he continued to involve himself in Irish-American affairs, including helping to organise a New York reception for released Fenian prisoners, the Cuba Five, in 1871.

From 1870, Roberts turned his attention to American politics, winning election to Congress as a Democrat and serving two terms in which he criticised British foreign policy, opposed the growing power of the railroad barons, and supported civil rights for African Americans. After leaving Congress he served on the New York City board of aldermen and was active within Tammany Hall before founding a rival political association. In 1885, in recognition of his support for Grover Cleveland's presidential campaign, he was appointed United States Ambassador to Chile, a post he held until a paralytic stroke in 1888 ended his diplomatic career. He spent his remaining years in poor health in New York and died in 1897.

== Biography ==
=== Early life ===
Roberts was born in Mitchelstown, County Cork, Ireland, the son of baker Randall Roberts and Mary Roberts (née Bishop). Roberts was educated in Cork before he immigrated to the United States in July 1849, aged 19, with the rest of his family. Roberts worked as a clerk for a dry goods company in New York for many years before he set up his own successful dry goods business, the ‘Crystal Palace’, which he would run until his retirement in 1869. According to a later account, Roberts spent close to a decade as a clerk for the noted New York businessman A. T. Stewart, whose dry goods emporium at 280 Broadway was known as the "Marble Palace", before his first attempt to establish a business of his own failed as a result of the Panic of 1857; he subsequently opened a successful store at 252 Bowery, near Houston Street.

=== Fenian ===
Roberts joined the newly emerging Fenian Brotherhood in 1863, an organisation made up of the Irish diaspora in America that was dedicated to establishing an independent Irish Republic. The Fenian Brotherhood operated as the American support wing of the Irish Republican Brotherhood (IRB), a secret society controlling the movement. Roberts, whose wealth allowed him to regularly donate to the organisation, quickly found himself amassing influence amongst the American Fenians. During the American Civil War, which raged from 1861 to 1864, thousands of Irishmen had joined the ranks of both armies, gaining military experience and were often now influenced by the idea of Radical Republicanism. The leader of the Fenian Brotherhood, the scholarly John O'Mahony (who himself served as an officer in the Union Army), thought the Irish veterans should be deployed to Ireland post-haste for a rebellion there, funded by the Irish in America. However, Roberts quickly became the leader of a faction of Fenians with an alternative plan. Roberts and his supporters argued instead that the Fenians should gather the Irish veterans and their resources, and instead attack Canada with the hopes of securing at least one Canadian region. By holding part of Canada, Roberts and his faction believed they could either hold that region for ransom from the British, or divert British military forces out of Ireland and into Canada, thereby leaving Ireland vulnerable to a rebellion. A subtext to Roberts and his faction's argument was that many veterans of the Union Army were angered by British support for the Confederacy during the war, and sought a measure of revenge by attacking Canada, regardless if this furthered Fenian objectives or not.

None of the biographical sources for Roberts records any military service during the Civil War itself, and it is possible he paid a substitute fee rather than serve after being drafted, but he was nonetheless afterwards referred to as "Colonel" Roberts in connection with his Fenian activities. During the war years Roberts became prominent in Irish-American civic life, serving as president of the Knights of St. Patrick in 1865 and presiding over the group's grand banquet at the Metropolitan Hotel on 17 March that year. He joined the Fenian Brotherhood's senate in 1865 and, possessed of a powerful speaking voice, became known as one of the movement's leading orators.

In February 1865, with the Civil war now finished, thousands of Fenians assembled for a convention in Cincinnati, Ohio. There Roberts' faction revised the Fenian Constitution by adding a preamble modelled on the Declaration of Independence as well as introducing of a number of checks and balances which effectively stripped O’Mahony of most of his power. The most notable of these changes were the introduction of a "senate" to advise the President of the Brotherhood, with most senators being made up of Roberts' supporters.

In October 1865 the Fenian Brotherhood held another convention in Philadelphia. In the days beforehand, Roberts lead a delegation of Fenians to a meeting with William Seward, the US secretary of state, and President Andrew Johnson. When Roberts' group pointedly asked what the Johnson Administration's response to a Fenian invasion of Canada would be, their reply was sufficiently vague enough for the Fenian delegation to believe they could launch the plan without significant resistance. A Fenian representative, B. Doran Killian, had separately met with Johnson the previous month and received similar indications that the American government would recognise a Fenian foothold in Canada as the "accomplished" Irish Republic in exile. Roberts arrived at the Philadelphia convention and relayed his account to the assembly. With the assembled Fenians enthralled by the report that the American government would not stand in their way should they raid Canada, Roberts and his faction would make a heave against O'Mahony. But before they did, O'Mahoney attempted to make a stand, proposing a motion supported by his mentor and the head of the IRB James Stephens; O'Mahoney proposed that longstanding US Army veteran Thomas William Sweeny be named "Secretary of War". Unbeknownst to either O'Mahoney or Stephens though, was that Sweeny was also a supporter of the plan to invade Canada. Sweeny was elected to the position, but regardless, the senate faction pushed for another change in the Fenian Brotherhood's constitution, which would replace the office of President (which O'Mahony held) entirely with the senate, which would be headed by Roberts. Before a rancorous convention, Roberts' "Senate" faction succeeded and O'Mahony was deposed.

That December, the Fenian senate formally impeached and deposed O'Mahony on charges including violation of his oath of office and mismanagement of the Brotherhood's funds. Roberts was among the senators who signed the judgment removing O'Mahony, and was thereafter named his successor as president of the Fenian Brotherhood, subsequently revoking the summons O'Mahony had issued for a rival Fenian congress of his own. O'Mahony's supporters responded by convening the Hamilton Rowan Circle in New York, which formally expelled Roberts, together with Patrick O'Rourke and Patrick Keenan, as enemies of the Brotherhood's welfare.

==== Raids on Canada ====
If we can get a foothold on which to raise the Irish flag we shall be recognized ... A government once established, it will have the sympathies of every Irishman. Irishmen in every quarter of the land seeing that we are working instead of talking, the cause will go triumphantly forward

— Roberts standing his rationale for raiding Canada

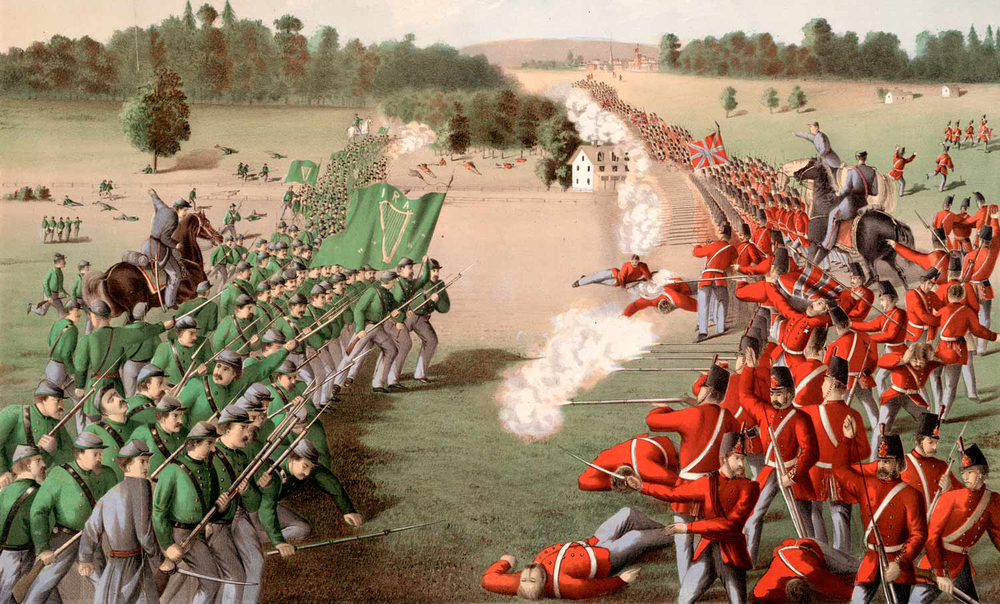
An artist's depiction of the Battle of Ridgeway, part of the Fenian Raids into Canada

During the early summer of 1866, thousands of armed, uniformed and supplied Fenians crossed the border from the US into Canada as part of an invasion. Although having some initial success against inexperienced Canadian militias, the Fenians were undone by poor logistics and the American government moving swiftly to block their efforts, fearing their activity would the pretext for a war between the US and the British. The invasion force itself was commanded by John O'Neill, who engaged a larger British force at Ridgeway on 2 June 1866; when the expected reinforcements failed to materialise, his men retreated across the Niagara River, where many were taken into custody by American troops under General George Meade, best known for commanding the Union forces at Gettysburg. Roberts participated in the invasion, and for his part, he was arrested in New York on 7 June. He would be detained until 15 June. Roberts was held during this period in the Ludlow Street Jail, the federal prison in New York City, and within days of his release he was reportedly being introduced around the halls of the Congress and meeting with prominent legislators, taken as one indication of the political influence then attributed to the Fenians. 3 days later, Roberts (thanks to the support of Irish-American politicians) was allowed to deliver an address to the US Senate appealing for them to support amnesty for IRB prisoners in Ireland. Afterwards, Roberts went on a speaking tour of America, where he told audiences that American politicians would not receive the support of the Irish community unless they supported Fenianism. Perhaps aware that this might be an accurate reading of sentiments, in September 1866 President Johnson ordered that the arms seized by the United States army from the Fenian during the invasion be returned.

In March 1867, Fenians in Ireland launched the Rebellion of 1867. Although directed by a number of veterans of the US Civil War, like the Fethard, County Tipperary born, confederate veteran Thomas Francis Bourke, or the Suresnes, Paris born, former Unionist Gustave Paul Cluseret, the effort was generally a disorganised failure. In the aftermath Roberts sent men on his behalf to take control of the Irish Republicanhood Brotherhood. In June 1867, Fenians from both Ireland and American assembled in Paris for a convention to decide their next move. During this visit Roberts also negotiated separately with a Fenian faction from the British Isles and signed a so-called Treaty of Paris pledging cooperation between the two groups, though little came of the agreement in practice. Roberts proposed that the IRB replace the office of President with a "Supreme Council", of which he would be the head. While the motion to create a Supreme Council succeeded, Roberts was not named the new leader. Incensed, Roberts resigned as leader of the Senate faction on 31 December 1867 and began to withdraw from revolutionary Fenianism. In 1870 he opposed more raids into Canada.

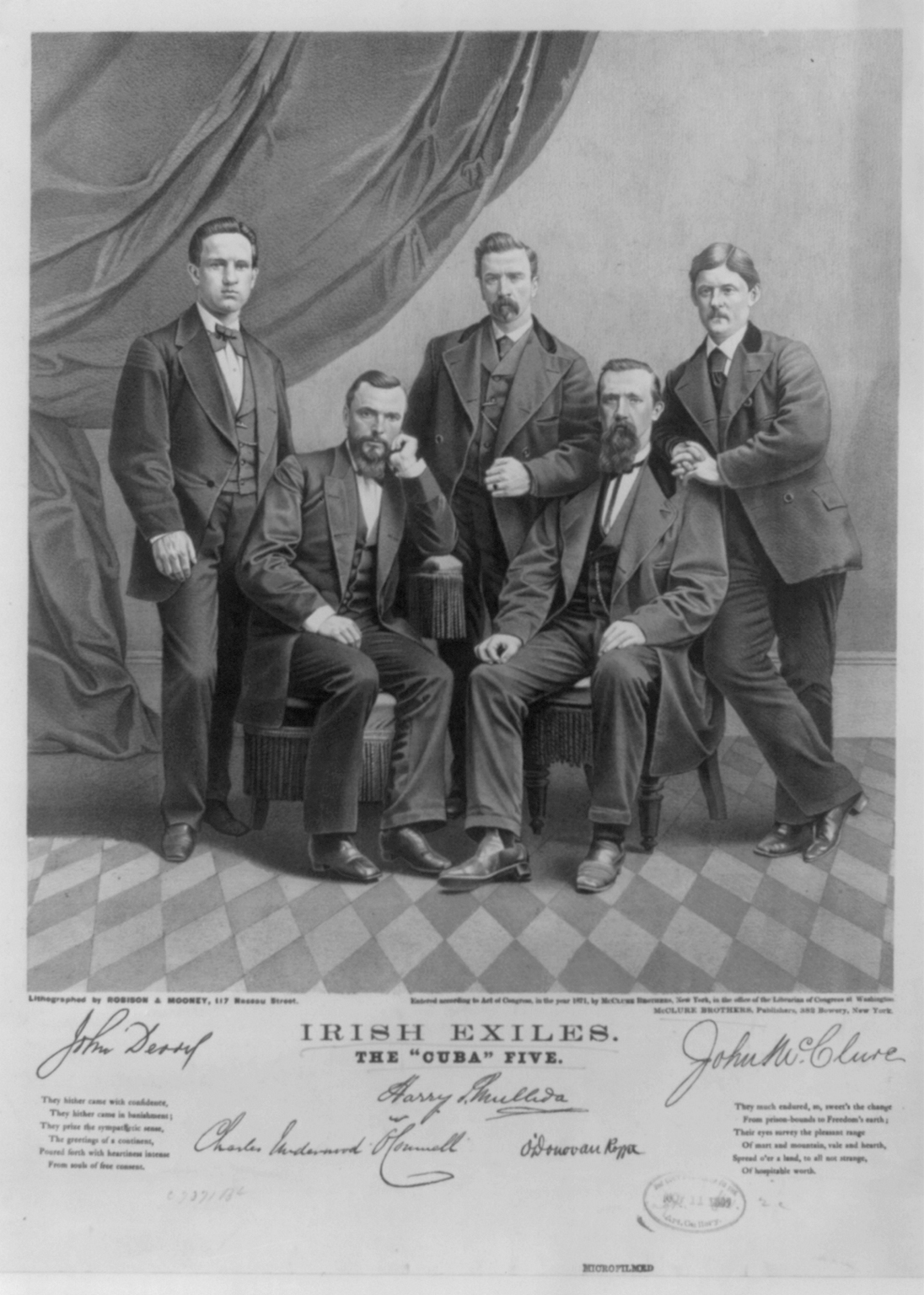
The "Cuba Five".

In January 1871 Roberts led a welcoming committee in New York for five recently released IRB leaders who had been exiled from Ireland by the British. As part of the Democratic Party's reception, Roberts, alongside the former Young Irelander Richard O'Gorman, boarded the chartered steamer Antelope to meet the arriving ship Cuba in New York harbour, one of several rival delegations, including Republican and United Irishmen parties, competing for the honour of welcoming the released prisoners, who became known as the "Cuba Five". This would be amongst the last of his Fenian activities as Roberts' attention shifted to American politics.

=== Congress ===
Roberts had been elected to Congress in 1870 from the Fifth Congressional District in Manhattan, winning some 13,000 of the 15,000 votes cast. Roberts was elected to the House of Representatives as a Democrat twice, to the Forty-second and Forty-third Congresses (March 4, 1871 – March 4, 1875). As a congressman, Roberts criticised the Republican government for its policy towards the former confederate states, opposed the increasing power of railroad barons, advocated for greater protection for American citizens living in foreign countries (with Fenians imprisoned in Canada in mind), supported civil rights for black people and was critical of British foreign policy. He was noted for voting against, and subsequently declining to accept, a $5,000 back-payment awarded to members of Congress, and was one of only two Democrats to vote for a supplemental bill in 1873 guaranteeing the rights of African Americans. On 20 May 1872 he delivered a speech to the House on the Alabama Claims, describing the damage inflicted on Union shipping by British-built Confederate vessels, which contemporaries described as one of the ablest presentments of Great Britain's position on the matter.

==== Career after Congress ====
By 1873, during his second term, a number of his earlier supporters had grown disgruntled at his failure to fulfil promises made to them and accused him of taking up residence outside the city to avoid them; that same year Roberts lost much of his fortune in the Panic of 1873, and the following year he declined re-nomination to Congress and returned to New York to pursue city politics. His finances prevented him from seeking further re-election to that office, but after his time in the House he was a member of the board of aldermen of New York City in 1877 and was an unsuccessful candidate for sheriff in 1879. He had in the meantime joined the Tammany Hall organisation, then under the leadership of "Honest" John Kelly, the first Catholic to head the organisation. Following a subsequent falling-out with Kelly, Roberts in 1881 founded the Washington Club, initially a social organisation which developed into an independent political association.

In 1882 Roberts supported Grover Cleveland for the governorship of New York as well as Cleveland's 1884 successful bid for the US presidency. As a reward, Roberts was appointed as Envoy Extraordinary and Minister Plenipotentiary to Chile by now President Cleveland on April 2, 1885, serving until August 19, 1889. As minister, Roberts spent much of his term pursuing the monetary claims of American citizens against the Chilean government, a task complicated by the cool relations between the United States and Chile that followed American attempts to intervene in the recently concluded War of the Pacific (1879–1883). In a report to Secretary of State Thomas F. Bayard in December 1886, Roberts described Chile as showing a "new and better spirit" towards the United States. He suffered ill health, believed to be rheumatism, during his time in Chile, and on one occasion took a two-month leave to recuperate at the mineral baths of Colina before touring the country and reporting to the State Department on Chilean wine production, mining, wages and agriculture, as well as the earlier campaigns of Bernardo O'Higgins against Spanish rule. He was succeeded in the position by Patrick Egan, a fellow Irishman and also a former member of the IRB.

== Death and burial ==
Roberts' term as Envoy to Chile had been cut short when he suffered a paralytic stroke in May 1888. Roberts returned to a New York City hospital for medical care, but was never able to recover his health and died nine years later on 9 August 1897. He died at Bellevue Hospital. He was buried in Calvary Cemetery, Woodside, New York. His body was later disinterred, and the cemetery's records do not indicate to where it was subsequently moved. He was survived by a wife and son, but whom he had been separated from before his stroke.

Later that month, Roberts' son, James F. Roberts, a lawyer in Flushing, New York, accused a Dr. J. N. Butler, son-in-law of a Mr. and Mrs. C. M. Siebert, of performing an autopsy on his father's body without notifying the family. Court testimony indicated that Roberts had met Mrs. Siebert some years earlier in the western United States, become infatuated with her, and brought her and her husband first to New York and later to Chile, where their conduct attracted comment, having appointed Siebert secretary of the legation. It was alleged that Roberts had subsequently been kept isolated by the Sieberts for nine years, prevented from communicating with his wife and children, and that his property had been taken from his control. Following his stroke, Roberts lived with the Sieberts at a house he owned at 106 West Seventy-sixth Street, which he later gave to them. James F. Roberts separately testified that he had not been on friendly terms with his father for fifteen years.

U.S. House of Representatives
Preceded by John Morrissey	Member of the U.S. House of Representatives from New York's 5th congressional district March 4, 1871 – March 4, 1875	Succeeded by Edwin R. Meade
Diplomatic posts
Preceded by Cornelius A. Logan	United States Minister to Chile; 4 July 1885 – 9 August 1889	Succeeded by Patrick Egan
