= All-Ireland Senior Club Camogie Championship 2005 =

Camogie championship

Winners
- Champions: St Lachtain’s, Freshford (Kilkenny) (2nd title)
- Manager: John Lyng
- Captain: Imelda Kennedy

Runners-up
- Runners-up: Davitts (Gal)

The 2005 All-Ireland Senior Club Camogie Championship for the leading clubs in the women's team field sport of camogie was won for the second year in succession by St Lachtain’s, Freshford (Kilkenny), who defeated Davitts (Gal) in the final, played at the Kilruane MacDonagh's GAA club in Cloughjordan.

== Arrangements ==
The championship was organised on the traditional provincial system used in Gaelic Games since the 1880s, with O’Donovan Rossa and Cashel winning the championships of the other two provinces. Marie Connor scored three goals for Lachtain’s in their semi-final victory over Rossa. Davitt’s Lourda Kavanagh scored an equalizing goal in the fourth minute of added time in the semi-final against Cashel. Then Caitríona Kelly secured Davitt’s place in the final with three well-taken goals in the replay.

== The Final ==
St Lachtain’s captain Margaret Hickey missed the final through injury, but scores from Imelda Kennedy and Marie O'Connor secured the title in her absence.

=== Final stages ===
October 29
Semi-Final

St Lachtain’s, Freshford (Kilkenny)	4-14 – 2-9	O’Donovan Rossa

November 6
Semi-Final

Davitts (Gal)	3-7 – 1-13	Cashel

Tynagh

November 13
Semi-Final Replay

Davitts (Gal)	3-9 – 1-9	Cashel

New Inn

November 20
Final

St Lachtain’s, Freshford (Kilkenny)	1-8 – 1-4	Davitts (Gal)

Cloughjordan

St Lachtain’s, Freshford	Davitts

St Lachtain’s
GK	1	Laura Comerford
RCB	2	Sinéad Cash
FB	3	Gillian Maher
LCB	4	Fiona Dowling
RWB	5	Margaret McCarthy
CB	6	Mairéad Costello
LWB	7	Daniella Minogue
MF	8	Deidre Delaney
MF	9	Aiofe Fitzpatrick
RWF	10	Sinéad Conner
CF	11	Esther Costello
LWF	12	Imelda Kennedy
RCF	13	Ann Dalton
FF	14	Marie Connor
LCF	15	Eileen Fitzpatrick

Davitts
GK	1	[Karen Power
RCB	2	Orla Watson
FB	3	Anne Broderick
LCB	4	Lizzie Flynn
RWB	5	Rita Broderick
CB	6	Ailbhe Kelly
LWB	7	Linda Gohery
MF	8	Deidre Murphy
MF	9	Phyllis Hayes
RWF	10	Caroline Kelly
CF	11	Caitríona Kelly
LWF	12	Deidre Gilchrist
RCF	13	Olive Ford
FF	14	Lourda Kavanagh
LCF	15	Mary Kelly

Preceded by All-Ireland Senior Club Camogie Championship 2004	All-Ireland Senior Club Camogie Championship; 1964 – present	Succeeded by All-Ireland Senior Club Camogie Championship 2006
