= All-Ireland Senior Club Camogie Championship 2000 =

Camogie championship

Winners
- Champions: Pearses (Galway) (3rd title)
- Captain: Áine Hillary

Runners-up
- Runners-up: Swatragh (Derry)
- Manager: Christopher "Bisto" McGuckin, Kevin McNaughton

The 2000 All-Ireland Senior Club Camogie Championship for the leading clubs in the women's team field sport of camogie was won by Pearses from Galway, who defeated Swatragh from Derry by eleven points in the final, played at Mullingar.

== Arrangements ==
The championship was organised on the traditional provincial system used in Gaelic Games since the 1880s, with Rathnure of Wexford and Ballingarry of Tipperary winning the championships of the other two provinces. Two goals in the first six minutes by Aileen Tohill and Paula McAtamney helped Swatragh eliminate the three-in-a-row seeking Granagh-Ballincarry. A late goal by Sharon Glynn secured Pearse's victory over Rathnure, for whom Geraldine Codd had scored a goal in the first minute.

== Final ==
The original match at Ballymacward on Nov 5 2000 was abandoned after 28 minutes due to worsening weather and ground conditions with Swatragh leading by 0–1 to no score, Pearses’ Sharon Glynn and Áine Hillary dominated the play in the replayed final. Gráinne Maguire had Swatragh's only goal from a free. Swatragh suffered a cruel blow prior to the final when the brilliant Paula McAtamney fractured her foot days before the replay.

=== Final stages ===
September 1
Semi-Final

Pearses (Gal)	1–10 – 2–2	Rathnure

September 8
Semi-Final

Swatragh (Derry)	2–8 – 1–7	Granagh-Ballingarry

Swatragh

December 3
Final

Pearses (Gal)	2–11 – 1–3	Swatragh (Derry)

Mullingar

Pearses	Swatragh

Pearses (Gal):
GK	1	Louise Curry
RCB	2	Anne Divilly
FB	3	Aisling Ward
LCB	4	Patricia Burke
RWB	5	Martina Haverty
CB	6	Tracey Laheen
LWB	7	Martina Harkins
MF	8	Carmel Hannon
MF	9	Veronica Sweeney
RWF	10	Michelle Glynn
CF	11	Áine Hillary (captain)
LWF	12	Orla Kilkenny
RCF	13	Shauna Ward
FF	14	Sharon Glynn
LCF	15	Anne Forde

Swatragh (Der):
GK	1	Margaret McAtamney
RCB	2	Breda McGuckin
FB	3	Claire Scullion
LCB	4	Joanne McKeagney
RWB	5	Nuala O'Hagan
CB	6	Gráinne Maguire
LWB	7	Paula McKenna
MF	8	Anna O'Loughlin
MF	9	Benie O'Loughlin
RWF	10	Aileen Tohill
CF	11	Aideen Mullan
LWF	12	Monica O'Kane
RCF	13	Claire McNicholl
FF	14	Oonagh Mullan
LCF	15	Deirdre Doherty

Preceded by All-Ireland Senior Club Camogie Championship 1999	All-Ireland Senior Club Camogie Championship; 1964 – present	Succeeded by All-Ireland Senior Club Camogie Championship 2001
