= Ballingarry, County Limerick =

Village in County Limerick, Ireland

Ballingarry Baile an Gharraí
- Village
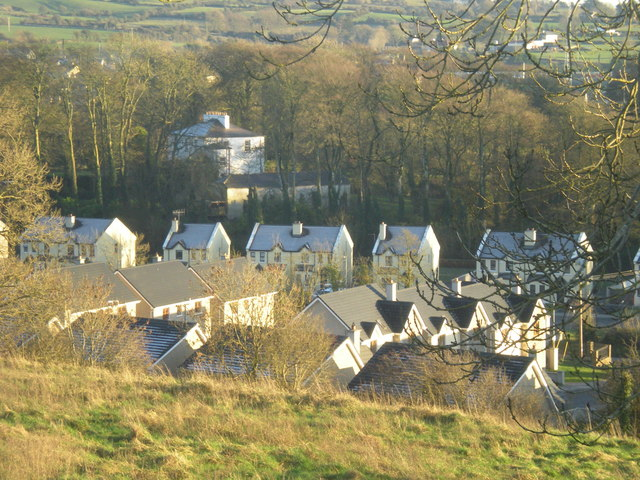
- Housing in Ballingarry

- Location in Ireland
- Coordinates: 52.474°N 8.863°W
- Country: Ireland
- Province: Munster
- County: County Limerick

Population (2022)
  - Total: 570
- Eircode routing key: V94
- Dialling code: 069
- Irish Grid Reference: R413361

Ballingarry (Irish: Baile an Gharraí, meaning 'town of the garden') is a village in County Limerick, Ireland. It is located near the village of Granagh and between the towns of Rathkeale and Kilmallock on the R518 road. Ballingarry lies in a civil parish of the same name, and within the ecclesiastical parish of Ballingarry-Granagh in the Roman Catholic Diocese of Limerick. The village had a population of 570 as of the 2022 census, up from 521 at the 2016 census.

== History ==
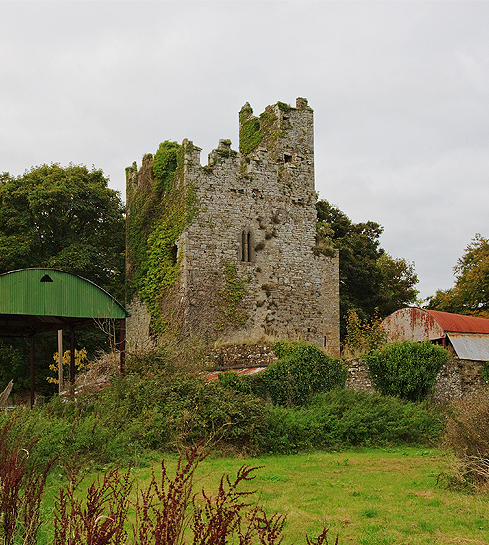
The remains of Ballingarry Castle

Evidence of ancient settlement around Ballingarry includes several ringfort and holy well sites. A number of early medieval religious houses, including a preceptory associated with the Knights Templar or Knights Hospitaller, were founded nearby from the 12th century. On Knight Street, within the village, is the 15th century Ballingarry Castle. This Norman tower house is traditionally associated with the De Lacy family.

The village's Church of Ireland church was built, in 1820, at the site of an earlier church and graveyard enclosure. The current Roman Catholic church is dedicated to Our Lady of the Immaculate Conception and opened in 1879. These churches are among seven buildings, in Ballingarry, included in the Record of Protected Structures for County Limerick.

Ballingarry had a significant weaving and linen industry until the Great Famine of the mid-19th century.

== Sport ==
The local Gaelic Athletic Association club, Granagh-Ballingarry GAA, is primarily involved in hurling and camogie. The club's hurling team won the Limerick Intermediate Hurling Championship in 2023. The Granagh-Ballingarry camogie team won the All-Ireland Senior Club Camogie Championship in 1998, 1999 and 2003.

The local association football (soccer) club, Ballingarry A.F.C., won the Desmond League Premier Division in 2003/2004.

== Notable people ==
- Anthony Forde (b. 1993), footballer, formerly of Wrexham A.F.C., is from the area.
- Edward Joseph Hannan (1836–1891), priest and founder of Hibernian Football Club, was born in Ballingarry in 1836.
- Patrick Walsh (1840–1899), a US Senator for Georgia, was born in Ballingarry in 1840. Appointed as a Democrat to the United States Senate to fill the vacancy caused by the death of Alfred H. Colquitt; subsequently elected and served from April 1894 to March 1895.

== See also ==
- List of towns and villages in Ireland
