= All-Ireland Senior Club Camogie Championship 1997 =

Camogie championship

Winners
- Champions: Pádraig Pearse's GAA (Galway) (2nd title)
- Captain: Ann Forde

Runners-up
- Runners-up: Lisdowney

The 1997 All-Ireland Senior Club Camogie Championship for the leading clubs in the women's team field sport of camogie was won for the second time in succession by Pádraig Pearse's GAA, (Galway), who defeated Lisdowney (Kilkenny) in the final, played at Ballymacward.

== Arrangements ==
The championship was organised on the traditional provincial system used in Gaelic Games since the 1880s, with Loughgiel Shamrocks of Antrim and Granagh-Ballingarry of Limerick winning the championships of the other two provinces.

== Final ==
Martina Haverty's goal for Pearses proved decisive in the final, as the Galway team led 3–3 to 1–0 at half time, but had to contend with a Lisdowney comeback which began when Ann Downey scored a goal from a free and Marina Downey added three points.

=== Final stages ===
September 1
Semi-Final

Pearse's (Gal)	3–14 – 1–7	Loughgiel Shamrocks

September 8
Semi-Final

Lisdowney	3–15– 3–13	Granagh-Ballingarry

November 23
Final

Pádraig Pearse's (Gal)	4–6 – 2–5	Lisdowney

Ballymacward

Pádraig Pearse's	Lisdowney

Pearse's (Gal):
GK	1	Louise Curry
FB	2	Aisling Ward
RWB	3	Martina Harkin
CB	4	Tracey Laheen
LWB	5	Bridget Kilgannon
MF	6	Veronica Sweeney
MF	7	Michelle Glynn
MF	8	Carmel Hannon
RWF	9	Áine Hillary
CF	10	Sharon Glynn
LWF	11	Martina Haverty
FF	12	Anne Forde (captain)

Lisdowney:
GK	1	Miriam Holland
FB	2	Fran Shore
RWB	3	Bridget Barnaville
CB	4	Kelly Long
LWB	5	Olivia Donnelly
MF	6	Marina Downey
MF	7	Ann Downey
MF	8	Catherine Dunne
RWF	9	Ann Marie Hughes
CF	10	Lizzie Fogarty
LWF	11	Angela Downey
FF	12	Anne Whelan

Preceded by All-Ireland Senior Club Camogie Championship 1996	All-Ireland Senior Club Camogie Championship; 1964 – present	Succeeded by All-Ireland Senior Club Camogie Championship 1998
