= All-Ireland Senior Club Camogie Championship 2002 =

Camogie championship

Winners
- Champions: Pádraig Pearse's GAA (Galway) (5th title)
- Captain: Áine Hillary

Runners-up
- Runners-up: St Ibar’s (Wx)

The 2002 All-Ireland Senior Club Camogie Championship for the leading clubs in the women's team field sport of camogie was won for the third year in succession by Pearse's from Galway, who defeated St Ibar’s from Wexford in the final, played at Ballinasloe.

== Arrangements ==
The championship was organised on the traditional provincial system used in Gaelic Games since the 1880s, with Cashel and Keady Lámh Dhearg winning the championships of the other two provinces. Orla Kilkenny’s goal gave Pearse’s victory over 2001 finalists Cashel in the semi-final. Two goals from Michelle Hearne and one each from Mag Kelly, Michelle Murphy and Kate Kelly gave St Ibar’s a final place against Keady.

== The Final ==
Pearses led by ten points at half time en route to their third successive All-Ireland.

=== Final stages ===
September 1
Semi-Final

Pearse's (Gal)	1-9 – 0-10	Cashel (Tipperary)

September 8
Semi-Final

St Ibar’s (Wx)	5-8 – 1-9	Keady Lámh Dhearg

Derrynoose

November 3
Final

Pearse's (Gal)	2-13 – 1-5	St Ibar's (Wx)

Ballinasloe

Pearse's	St Ibar's

Pearse's (Gal):
GK	1	Louise Curry
RCB	2	Síle Barrett
FB	3	Aisling Ward
LCB	4	Patricia Burke
RWB	5	Martina Donnellan
CB	6	Tracy Laheen
LWB	7	Martina Harkin
MF	8	Áine Hillary (captain)
MF	9	Carmel Hannon
RWF	10	Orla Kilkenny
CF	11	Veronica Sweeney
LWF	12	Michelle Glynn
RCF	13	Shauna Ward
FF	14	Sharon Glynn
LCF	15	Lorraine Lally

St Ibar's (Wx):
GK	1	Jenna Murphy
RCB	2	Edwina Roche
FB	3	Emma Carroll
LCB	4	Catherine Doyle
RWB	5	Assumpta Cullen
CB	6	Sandy Carr
LWB	7	Laura Corrigan
MF	8	Fiona Cullen
MF	9	Kate Kelly (0–3)
RWF	10	Michelle Murphy (0–1)
CF	11	Jacqui O'Connor
LWF	12	Bridget Curran (0–1)
RCF	13	Mag Kelly
FF	14	Michelle Hearne
LCF	15	Anne Marie Kelly

Preceded by All-Ireland Senior Club Camogie Championship 2001	All-Ireland Senior Club Camogie Championship; 1964 – present	Succeeded by All-Ireland Senior Club Camogie Championship 2003
