= All-Ireland Senior Club Camogie Championship 1995 =

Camogie championship

Winners
- Champions: Rathnure (Wexford) (1st title)
- Manager: Teddy O'Connor
- Captain: Geraldine Codd

Runners-up
- Runners-up: Toomevara (Tip)

The 1995 All-Ireland Senior Club Camogie Championship for the leading clubs in the women's team field sport of camogie was won by Rathnure (from Wexford, who defeated Toomevara from Tipperary in the final, played at Toomevara.

== Arrangements ==
The championship was organised on the traditional provincial system used in Gaelic Games since the 1880s, with Leitrim Fontenoys and Davitts winning the championships of the other two provinces. Deirdre Hughes scored four goals for Toomevara to defeat Davitts of Galway in the semi-final, the fourth in extra time. Rathnure’s Ann Reddy scored 4–1 and Geraldine Codd 1–10 as they defeated Leitrim Fontenoys in their semi-final. Maureen McAleenan (0–7) and Nuala McGee (1–2) scored for Leitrim.

== The Final ==
Marguerite Somers’ goal for Rathnure gave them a 1–5 to 0–3 half-time lead in the final and Bernie Higgins and Ann Reddy scored match-winning goals in the third quarter when. Toomevara’s attempt to save the match was saved by Rathnure goalkeeper Mary Fleming. A blow-torch was needed before the deeply frozen section of the pitch at Toomevara was declared playable.

=== Final stages ===
September 1
Semi-Final

Rathnure (Wx)	5-11 – 1-9	Leitrim Fontenoys

September 8
Semi-Final

Toomevara (Tip)	4-6 – 3-7 after extra time	Davitts

Craughwell

November 21
Final

Rathnure (Wx)	4-9 – 1-5	Toomevara (Tip)

Toomevara

Rathnure (Wx)	Toomevara (Tip)

Rathnure (Wx):
GK	1	Mary Fleming
FB	2	Catherine Murphy
RWB	3	Anna- Mai White
CB	4	Mary Hayden
LWB	5	Claire O'Connor
MF	6	Norma Carty
MF	7	Aoife O'Connor
MF	8	Michelle O'Leary
RWF	9	Bernie Higgins
CF	10	Ann Reddy
LWF	11	Marguerite Somers
FF	12	Geraldine Codd (captain)

Toomevara (Tip):
GK	1	Nora Dwan
FB	2	Siobhán Cusack
RWB	3	Aileen Delaney
CB	4	Cora Kennedy
LWB	5	Regina O'Meara
MF	6	Miriam Maxwell
MF	7	Siobhán Kelly (captain)
MF	8	Siobhan Maxwell
RWF	9	Josie Browne
CF	10	Deirdre Hughes
LWF	11	Anne Gleeson
FF	12	Noelle Kennedy

Preceded by All-Ireland Senior Club Camogie Championship 1994	All-Ireland Senior Club Camogie Championship; 1964 – present	Succeeded by All-Ireland Senior Club Camogie Championship 1996
