= Granagh =

Village in County Limerick, Ireland

Granagh An Greanach
- Village
- Location in Ireland
- Coordinates: 52°27′36″N 08°45′50″W
- Country: Ireland
- Province: Munster
- County: County Limerick
- Time zone: UTC+0 (WET)
  - Summer (DST): UTC-1 (IST (WEST))

Granagh (Irish: An Greanach, meaning 'gravely place') is a small village in County Limerick, Ireland. It is close to the village of Ballingarry and near the N20 road between Croom and Charleville. Granagh is a chapel village (a village that grew up around the church).

The camogie team of Granagh-Ballingarry GAA club have won three All-Ireland club titles.

== Archaeology ==
The 'Blessed Well' or 'St John's Well' was a small holy well surrounded by thorn bushes inside north fence of road 400 yards west of Granagh Catholic church. Construction of the creamery and concrete yard appears to have removed all traces of the holy well and no archaeological features or finds were uncovered in the monitored area.

== See also ==
- List of towns and villages in Ireland
