= Granagh-Ballingarry GAA =

Gaelic games club in County Limerick, Ireland

Granagh-Ballingarry
- Greanach-Baile an Gharraí
- Founded: 1990
- County: Limerick
- Colours: Green & black
- Grounds: Clontemple, Ballingarry
- Coordinates: 52°28′22.56″N 8°51′25.99″W

Playing kits
Standard colours

Senior Club Championships
	All Ireland	Munster champions	Limerick champions
Hurling:	-	-	3
Camogie:	3	7	24

Granagh-Ballingarry GAA (Irish: Greanach-Baile an Gharraí) is a Gaelic Athletic Association club based in west County Limerick, Ireland, within the jurisdiction of Limerick GAA. The club is situated near Knockfierna Hill, close to the villages of Granagh and Ballingarry. Granagh-Ballingarry GAA was formed in 1990 after the merger between Granagh and Ballingarry GAA clubs. Previously, the clubs had been playing together in some competitions.

== Hurling ==
Hurling is the more popular game in the parish. Granagh-Ballingarry are currently (2021) in the Intermediate grade. This is the third tier of the Limerick Hurling Championship. They had enjoyed a period at Senior, after defeating Glenroe GAA 4–10 to 3–10 in the 2005 Limerick Intermediate Hurling Championship. Granagh-Ballingarry reached the 2006 Limerick Senior Hurling quarter finals, and also in 2007, where they were defeated by Kilmallock. The club were defeated by Garryspillane at the quarter-final stage in 2008 and were defeated by Croom in a round 3 game in 2009. 2010 placed them up against Kilmallock again and the team lost out badly at the quarter-final stage again. The club won their first senior championship in 1911 under the guise of Ballingarry, after having won the intermediate championship the year before. The club were also finalists in 1896, 1904 and 1912 as Ballingarry, and in 1945 under the current name, Granagh-Ballingarry. In the 1990s the club won several Limerick GAA West Division championships, before winning the Limerick Junior Hurling Championship in 1998. The club also won a West Senior Hurling Championship in 2008 defeating Adare.

=== Underage hurling ===
The minor hurling team has reached two Limerick Minor Hurling Championship finals, firstly in 1971, defeating Kilmallock, before finishing runners-up to Kilmallock in 2006.

== Camogie ==
Granagh-Ballingarry camogie club is the joint fifth most successful club in the history of the All-Ireland Senior Club Camogie Championship with a total of three victories in 1998, 1999 and 2003. They won further Munster championships in 1996, 1997, 2000 and 2004. The modern club was formed in 1976 by Michael O’Brien and John O’Connor. Tommy Treacy was a successful coach, quickly yielding honours from under-12 up. Many of the players attended St Mary's Secondary School, Charleville, where Vincent Harrington coached the team to successive colleges championships.

== Notable players & members ==
- Donal O'Grady played for Limerick 2003 to 2016. 46 appearances for Limerick. All Star nominee. Limerick Senior Hurling Selector 2020 - 2024
