= R518 road (Ireland) =

Road in Ireland

R518 road
- Bóthar R518
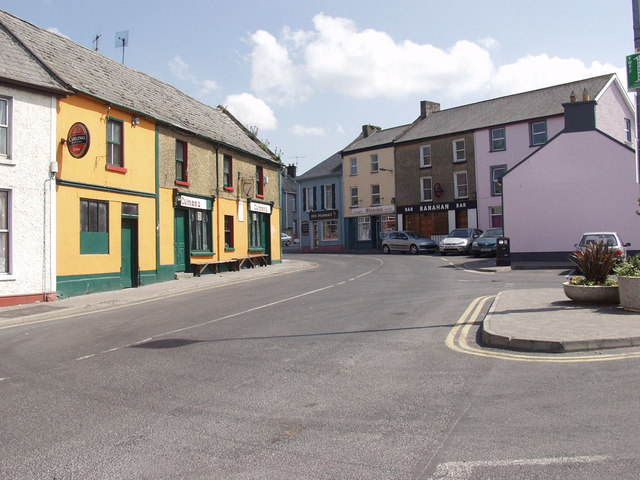
- The Square, Askeaton, on the R518

Location
- Country: Ireland

Highway system
- Roads in Ireland; Motorways; Primary; Secondary; Regional

The R518 road is a regional road in Ireland which runs from Kilmallock via Rathkeale, to Askeaton, all in County Limerick.

== See also ==
- Roads in Ireland
- National primary road
- National secondary road
