= Vera Sheehan =

Irish camogie player

Personal information
- Native name: Fíora Ní Síocháin (Irish)
- Born: Limerick, Ireland

Sport
- Sport: Camogie
- Position: Centre field
Club*
Years	Club	Apps (scores)
	Granagh-Ballingarry	?
Inter-county**
Years	County	Apps (scores)
	Limerick	?
- * club appearances and scores correct as of (16:31, 30 June 2010 (UTC)). **Inter County team apps and scores correct as of (16:31, 30 June 2010 (UTC)).

Vera Sheehan is a camogie player, winner of a Lynchpin award, predecessor of the All Star awards, in 2003.

== Career ==
She won club championship medals with Granagh-Ballingarry in 1999, 2000 and 2003. In 1997 she captained St Mary's Charleville to the secondary schools All Ireland championship. In 2003, she featured on the RTÉ programme Breaking Ball, along with her sisters Maureen, Deirdre and Aoife. When the All Star awards scheme was officially recognised, she was short-listed in 2004, 2005, and 2007,
