= Irish American journalism =

Irish American journalism is newspapers, magazines, and newer media as disseminated by Irish-American reporters, editors, commentators, producers and other key personnel.

== Beginnings ==
The first Catholic newspaper in the United States was The United States Catholic Miscellany of Charleston, South Carolina. It was founded in 1822 by Bishop John England (1786–1842), who had experience as an editor in Ireland. It was renamed Charleston Catholic Miscellany when South Carolina seceded; it ceased publication in 1861 during the Civil War.

== Civil War ==
John Mitchel (1815–1875), a Protestant fighter for Irish independence who had been imprisoned by the British, escaped, came to the U.S. and became the editor of a leading Confederate newspaper in Richmond during the Civil War.

James McMaster, editor of Freeman's Journal in New York, was a cautious moderate Democrat before the Civil War started. Once the shooting began, he turned strongly against the Lincoln administration, and became an angry leader of the antiwar Copperhead movement.

== Boston ==
John Boyle O'Reilly, (1844–1890) was the editor of Boston Pilot. Other editors included Thomas D'Arcy McGee (1825–1868) and James Jeffrey Roche (1847–1908). Roche joined the staff in 1866, and in 1890 became editor and the leading spokesman for Catholic intellectuals in New England. He was an active liberal Democrat who gave support to labor unions. His Pilot was one of the few newspapers to support William Jennings Bryan in 1896 and 1900.

As the political and intellectual center of Irish America, Boston produced numerous journalists for the secular press, especially the tabloids that attracted an Irish readership. By the 1890s the city's major newspaper, the Boston Globe had become a stronghold, with an editorial staff dominated by Irish Catholics.

== New York and Brooklyn ==
Patrick Ford, (1837–1913) founded the Irish World in New York.; Austin E. Ford (1857–1896) was editor of the New York Freeman; John Devoy (1842–1928) was editor of the Gaelic American 1903–1928.

James McMaster (1820–1886), was editor of Freeman's Journal. The son of a Scots-Irish Presbyterian minister, he converted to Catholicism in 1845 and became a journalist. In 1848 he purchased the Freeman's Journal and Catholic Register. He edited it until his death, giving it a national audience and influence. He quarreled endlessly with other Catholic leaders. As an anti-war Copperhead he was most famous for his arrest in 1861 on treason charges, as his newspaper was suppressed by the federal government for supporting the Confederacy. He was briefly in prison, but allowed to resume publication in 1862. He was a strong supporter of parochial schools and the papacy.

Pat Scanlan (1894–1983) was the managing editor (1917–1968) of the Brooklyn Tablet, the official paper of the Brooklyn diocese. He was a leader in the fight against the Ku Klux Klan, and in favor of the work of the National Legion of Decency in minimizing sexuality in Hollywood films. Historian Richard Powers says Scanlan emerged in the 1920s:

as the leading spokesman for an especially pugnacious brand of militant Catholic anti-communism, that of Irish-Americans who, after suffering from 100 years of anti-Catholic prejudice in America, reacted to any criticism of the Church as a bigoted attack on their own hard-won status in American society... He combined a vivid writing style filled with Menckenesque invective, with an unbridled love of controversy. Under Scanlan, the Tablet became the national voice of Irish Catholic anti-communism – and a thorn in the side of New York's Protestants and Jews.

== Chicago ==
James W. Sheahan made the Chicago Times the voice of the Democratic Party in Chicago. It was funded by Senator Stephen A. Douglas, who needed a press after the main Chicago papers deserted him in 1854. Sheahan sold the paper after Douglas died in 1861.

Joseph Medill (1823–1899), born to a Scots-Irish family in Canada, was the co-owner and managing editor of the Chicago Tribune. A Republican politician, he was elected Mayor of Chicago after the great fire of 1871, which destroyed the entire business district, including the Tribune building.

Margaret Buchanan Sullivan (1847–1903), working for the Democratic newspaper, Chicago Times, was Chicago's best-known reporter in the 1870s and 1880s. She was an activist for woman suffrage and for Irish nationalism, as well as an articulate opponent of anti-Catholicism.

James Keeley (1867–1934), a poor Irish Catholic boy in London, emigrated alone in 1883, and worked in numerous newspapers. He was the powerful managing editor of the Chicago Tribune from 1898 to 1914. From 1911 he simultaneously served as founding dean of the school of journalism at the University of Notre Dame, in South Bend, Indiana.

== Diocesan newspapers ==
Practically all dioceses distribute weekly newspapers; Irish editors are common. Founded in 1912 by Father John F. Noll, the weekly newspaper Our Sunday Visitor is widely distributed at many parishes as a supplement or in coordination with the local paper., It soon became the most popular Catholic newsweekly. It publishes numerous books and the annual Catholic Almanac. The oldest is the Pittsburgh Catholic, in published continuously since 1844. In Boston the Pilot was purchased by the archdiocese in 1905 and became its official outlet.

The weekly Brooklyn Tablet became the official newspaper of the diocese of Brooklyn in 1908. Now an archdiocese, Brooklyn has always been independent of the archdiocese of New York.

== Magazines ==
=== America ===
America is a national weekly magazine published by the Jesuits since 1909. It features news and opinion about Catholicism, and how it relates to American politics and cultural life. Under editor Thomas J. Reese from 1998 to 2005, the magazine published articles and opinion pieces taking positions contrary to official Catholic social teaching on matters such as homosexuality, clerical celibacy, HIV/AIDS, and the roles of women. Reese was forced to resign in May 2005 under orders from conservative theologian Cardinal Joseph Ratzinger—the later Pope Benedict XVI—whose Vatican agency had been monitoring America for years.

== 20th century ==
=== William F. Buckley, Jr. ===
Shortly after graduating Yale, the young Bill Buckley in 1955 founded the political magazine National Review. It not only provided weekly intellectual substance for the Conservatism in the United States, it defined the standards and central issues of a major political movement that finally triumphed in the election of Ronald Reagan in 1980. Besides Numerous novels, Buckley wrote essays and columns that were widely distributed and hosted 1,429 episodes of the television show Firing Line (1966–1999) where he became known for his transatlantic accent and sesquipedalian vocabulary. Historian George H. Nash said Buckley was "arguably the most important public intellectual in the United States in the past half century... For an entire generation, he was the preeminent voice of American conservatism and its first great ecumenical figure."

=== Radio and television ===
==== Charles Coughlin ====
Charles Coughlin was a highly controversial Roman Catholic priest based near Detroit. He Started broadcasting has sermons to a national audience, turning increasingly to political topics. He was the first political commentator to use radio to reach a mass audience, as up to thirty million listeners tuned to his weekly broadcasts during the 1930s. Originally a liberal supporter of Democrat Franklin D. Roosevelt, by 1934 he became a harsh critic of Roosevelt as too friendly to bankers. In 1934 he announced a new political organization called the National Union for Social Justice. He wrote a platform calling for monetary reforms, the nationalization of major industries and railroads, and protection of the rights of labor. The membership ran into the millions, but it was not well-organized at the local level. By the late 1930s, Coughlin's program, while still quite popular, focused increasingly on evil bankers and Jews. In 1939 the Roosevelt administration finally forced the cancellation of his radio program and forbade the dissemination through the mail of his newspaper, Social Justice.

==== Talk radio ====
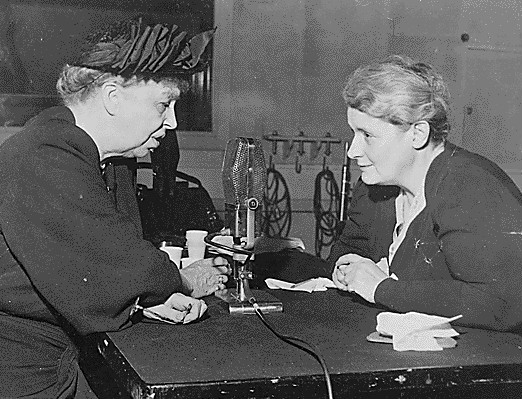
Mary Margaret McBride (right) interviews First Lady Eleanor Roosevelt.

One of the first and most popular of the radio talk show hosts from the 1934 to 1950 was Mary Margaret McBride (1899–1976). From an early career in newspaper and magazine writing she moved to WOR radio in New York in 1934. Her daily woman's-advice show presented a kind and witty grandmother figure with a Missouri-drawl. In 1937, she launched on the national CBS radio network a similar and highly successful show. As Mary Margaret McBride, she interviewed figures well known in the world of arts, entertainment, and politics for 45 minutes, using a style recognized as original to herself. In the 1940s the daily audience for her housewife-oriented program numbered from six to eight million listeners.

== 21st century ==
=== Talk show hosts ===
Ed Sullivan was one of the most prominent television personalities of the 1950s and 1960s.

Chris Matthews is best known for his nightly hour-long talk show, Hardball with Chris Matthews, which is televised on the cable television channel MSNBC.

== See also ==
=== Topics ===
- German American journalism
- History of American newspapers
- Journalism culture

=== Publications ===
- Catholic World magazine (1865–1996)
- Donahoe's Magazine (1878–1908)
- Gaelic American, New York
- New York Freeman, New York
- Social Justice (periodical) (1936–1942)
- The Pilot (Massachusetts newspaper), Boston

=== Personalities ===
- Jimmy Breslin
- Maureen Dowd
- Charles Benedict Driscoll (1885–1951)
- Finley Peter Dunne (1867–1936)
- James Hagerty (1909–1981) - White House Press Secretary from 1953 to 1961 under President Eisenhower
- Pete Hamill
- Sean Hannity
- Magee Hickey
- Mary McGrory (1918–2004) - Washington political reporter and columnist
- Peggy Noonan (born 1950) - author, political analyst and columnist
- Soledad O'Brien - journalist and producer
- Norah O'Donnell
- Bill O'Reilly
- John L. O'Sullivan (1813–1895)
- James Jeffrey Roche (1847–1908)
- Tim Russert (1950–2008) - hosted NBC's Meet the Press, 1991–2008
- Mark Shields (born 1937)
- Brian Williams - NBC News anchor
