= Editor-in-chief =

Publication's editorial leader

An editor-in-chief (EIC), also known as lead editor, chief editor, executive editor, or simply editor, is a publication's editorial leader who has final responsibility for its operations and policies. The editor-in-chief heads all departments of the organization and is held accountable for delegating tasks to staff members and managing them. The term is often used at newspapers, magazines, yearbooks, and television news programs. The editor-in-chief is commonly the link between the publisher or proprietor and the editorial staff.

== Responsibilities ==
Typical responsibilities of editors-in-chief include:

- Ensuring that content is journalistically objective
- Fact-checking, spelling, grammar, writing style, page design and photos
- Rejecting writing that appears to be plagiarized, ghostwritten, published elsewhere, or of little interest to readers
- Evaluating and editing content
- Contributing editorial pieces
- Motivating and developing editorial staff
- Ensuring the final draft is complete
- Handling reader complaints and taking responsibility for issues after publication
- For books and journals, cross-checking citations and examining references
- Working to advance the commercial success of the publication
- Position may involve recruiting, hiring and firing staff

=== In academic journals ===
The term is also applied to academic journals, where the editor-in-chief gives the ultimate decision whether a submitted manuscript will be published. This decision is made by the editor-in-chief after seeking input from reviewers selected on the basis of relevant expertise. For larger journals, the decision is often upon the recommendation of one of several associate editors who each have responsibility for a fraction of the submitted manuscripts.

== See also ==
- Journalism ethics and standards – Principles of ethics and of good practice in journalism
- Journalistic interventionism
- Value judgment – Philosophical and ethical concept
