= Abram Joseph Ryan =

American priest and poet

Abram J. Ryan, ca. 1875

Abram Joseph Ryan (born Matthew Abraham Ryan; February 5, 1838 – April 22, 1886) was an American Catholic poet, priest, journalist, orator, and former Vincentian. Historians disagree on whether Ryan served as a military chaplain for the Confederate States of America. He has been called the "Poet-Priest of the South" and the "Poet Laureate of the Confederacy".

Ryan was born in Maryland to Irish Catholic immigrants. He attended a Christian Brothers school in Missouri, and then, at the age of 13, he attended a seminary run by the Vincentians. He entered the order and was sent to seminary in New York to study theology and oversee the boys in the seminary's school.

Vocally opposed to abolitionism, he was sent back to Missouri. Having gained experience as a preacher in rural areas, Ryan was ordained in 1860. After the American Civil War broke out, he went back and forth a few times between New York and Missouri, and then to Illinois, leaving the Vincentians. While he never formally joined the army, he served as a freelance chaplain for the last two years of the war for both North and South soldiers, during which time his enlisted brother was killed.

Ryan had been writing poetry since his college days, and his "The Conquered Banner" was printed in June 1865. He moved from one parish in the South to another, writing poetry and sermons. He founded a journal which published mainly Southern writers, and published a volume of his own collected poetry which was popular in the US and in Ireland. He died in 1886 in Kentucky and was buried in Mobile, Alabama.

== Early life ==
He was born Matthew Abraham Ryan in Hagerstown, Maryland on February 5, 1838, the fourth child of Irish immigrants Matthew Ryan and Mary Coughlin, both of Clogheen, County Tipperary. He was their first child to be born in the United States. The family had initially settled in Norfolk, Virginia, after their arrival in America sometime prior to 1835, but soon moved to Maryland, where the father obtained work as the overseer of a plantation with enslaved people. Ryan was named after this plantation's owner.

In 1840 the family relocated to Ralls County, Missouri, and then, in 1846, to St. Louis, where the father opened a general store. The young Abraham Ryan, as he was called, was educated at St. Joseph's Academy, run by the Christian Brothers. Showing a strong inclination to piety, he was encouraged by his mother and teachers to consider becoming a priest. Ryan decided to test a calling to the priesthood and on September 16, 1851, at the age of 13, entered the College of St. Mary's of the Barrens, near Perryville, Missouri. It was run by the Vincentian Fathers as a minor seminary for young candidates for the priesthood, providing them a classical education with free room and board.

In the summer of 1854, Ryan decided to pursue Holy Orders, at which time he explained his decision to his close childhood friend, Ethel, with whom he had grown up. At the end of that summer, Ethel announced her decision to become a nun, later becoming Sister Mary Loretto. Ryan later considered Ethel his "spiritual wife". On September 12, 1860, Ryan was ordained as a Vincentian Catholic priest.

== Vincentian ministry ==
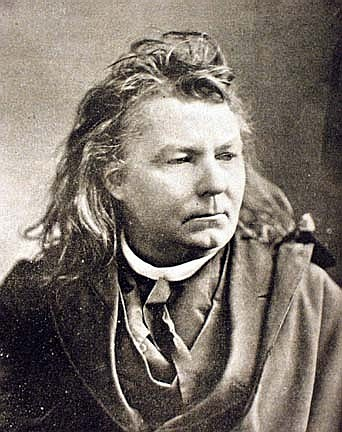
Abram J. Ryan

Ryan entered the Vincentians, taking the oath of obedience to the Congregation. He did three more years of study at the college during the course of which, on June 19, 1857, he received minor orders. The poetry that he wrote to entertain his schoolmates impressed them, especially one who recorded the texts in a personal journal. In 1858, shortly after the death of his father, Ryan was sent to the Seminary of Our Lady of the Angels near Niagara Falls, New York. He was sent there both to pursue his study of theology and to serve as the prefect of discipline for the boys enrolled at the preparatory school attached to the seminary.

Ryan soon showed signs of discontent with his situation there. In January 1859 he wrote his Provincial Superior, complaining that the expected instruction in theology was not being done and about the weight of his workload with the boys, being alone in this task. A reply counseling patience brought another request for a change of the situation, which included a veiled hint at the possibility of his leaving the Congregation. Ryan was satisfied to be allowed to resume his own studies, and his younger brother, David, now also a member of the Congregation, was assigned to assist him.

The Ryan brothers felt out of place as Southerners at the Western New York seminary. Abraham Ryan soon began to express his opposition to the abolitionist movement which had gained strength in the Northeast. He joined in sentiments expressed by Catholic bishops and editors in the United States in that period, who felt threatened by the anti-Catholic opinions voiced by the leadership of the Abolitionists. His writings in that period began to express suspicion of Northern goals. Possibly for that reason, Ryan was sent back to St. Mary of the Barrens, as their superiors might have decided to keep the brothers separated.

During the winter of 1860, Ryan gave a lecture series through which he started to gain notice as a speaker. He was ordained a deacon that summer after which he was chosen to accompany a group of Vincentian priests on a preaching tour of the rural parishes of the region in order to revive devotion to the faith. His abilities as a preacher gained wide approval, and his superiors decided to have him ordained a priest earlier than was the normal age under church law. Having gained the permission of the Holy See, on September 12, 1860, he was ordained a priest. The ceremony took place at his home parish in St. Louis, with the ordination being performed by the Bishop of St. Louis, Peter Richard Kenrick, with his mother and siblings in attendance.

Ryan spent the rest of the summer on another preaching tour, this time in the company of his Provincial Superior. Conflict arose during the course of the tour as the superior felt that Ryan's preaching was not fully spiritually centered, and Ryan felt the criticism keenly. As a new priest, he was assigned to teach theology at St. Mary's of the Barrens.

He was also listed in 1860–61 on the faculty roster of St. Vincent's College in Cape Girardeau, Missouri. Founded in 1843, St. Vincent's was the forerunner of De Paul University in Chicago, now the nation's largest Catholic university. Frequent bouts of illness, however, kept Ryan confined to bed until the following spring. It was at that time that the inauguration of Abraham Lincoln took place. Ryan was so incensed at being called by the same name as the new president, whom he despised, that he began to use the shortened version by which he had been called as a boy, the form by which he became known in history.

In the fall of 1861, soon after the start of the American Civil War, Ryan was transferred back to Our Lady of the Angels Seminary in New York but remained there for only a month before once more falling ill. He was allowed to go to his mother's home in St. Louis to rest. He returned to New York to teach at the start of 1862 but soon fell ill again and was allowed to go back home. In April he declared himself fit to teach again, but his superiors instead transferred him to parish duties in La Salle, Illinois.

After arriving there, Ryan realized that he would not be able to express his strong views in support of the Confederacy. Frustrated, and feeling ignored by his immediate superior, he wrote directly to the Superior General of the Congregation in Paris, asking to be released from his vows. He pleaded his poor health and his personal conflict with the Provincial Superior. After not receiving a reply, he sent a second request, to which he received a positive response the following August. He determined to sign the release forms on that following September 1 and immediately returned home, where he was soon joined by his brother David, who had left the seminary in New York with the intention of enlisting in the Confederate Army.

== Civil War service ==
Early researcher Joseph McKey believed that Ryan took occasional periods of sick leave from these positions due to bouts of neuralgia, but Ryan's friend, J. M. Lucey, and several other clerical contemporaries believed that Ryan had made sporadic early appearances as a freelance chaplain among Confederate troops from Louisiana. Some circumstantial evidence supports Lucey's position: Ryan's handwritten entries disappeared from the St. Mary's Seminary house diary for a full month after the battle of First Manassas, for example, during a period when the Archbishop of New Orleans was actively recruiting freelance (unofficial) Catholic chaplains to serve Louisiana troops. And in a newspaper account of his 1883 sermon in Alexandria, Virginia, Ryan was quoted as having mentioned his ministry to Louisiana soldiers during the war. Tennessee historian Thomas Stritch confirms that Ryan began making appearances in Tennessee in 1862, even while his official postings were in Niagara and Illinois, and these absences from his northern posts may have been the underlying cause of his frequent reassignments. During one of these absences, in October 1862, Ryan was arrested in Nashville, Tennessee by Union authorities for making "seditious utterances".

Ryan began full-time pastoral duties in Tennessee in late 1863 or early 1864. Though he never formally joined the Confederate Army, he clearly was serving as a freelance chaplain by the last two years of the conflict, with possible appearances at the Battle of Lookout Mountain and the Battle of Missionary Ridge near Chattanooga (both in late November 1863), and well-authenticated service at the Battle of Franklin (November 1864) and the subsequent Battle of Nashville (December 1864). Some of his poems—"In Memoriam" and "In Memory of My Brother"—came in response to his brother's death, who died while serving in uniform for the Confederacy in April 1863, probably from injuries suffered during fighting near Mt. Sterling, Kentucky.

== Postbellum ==
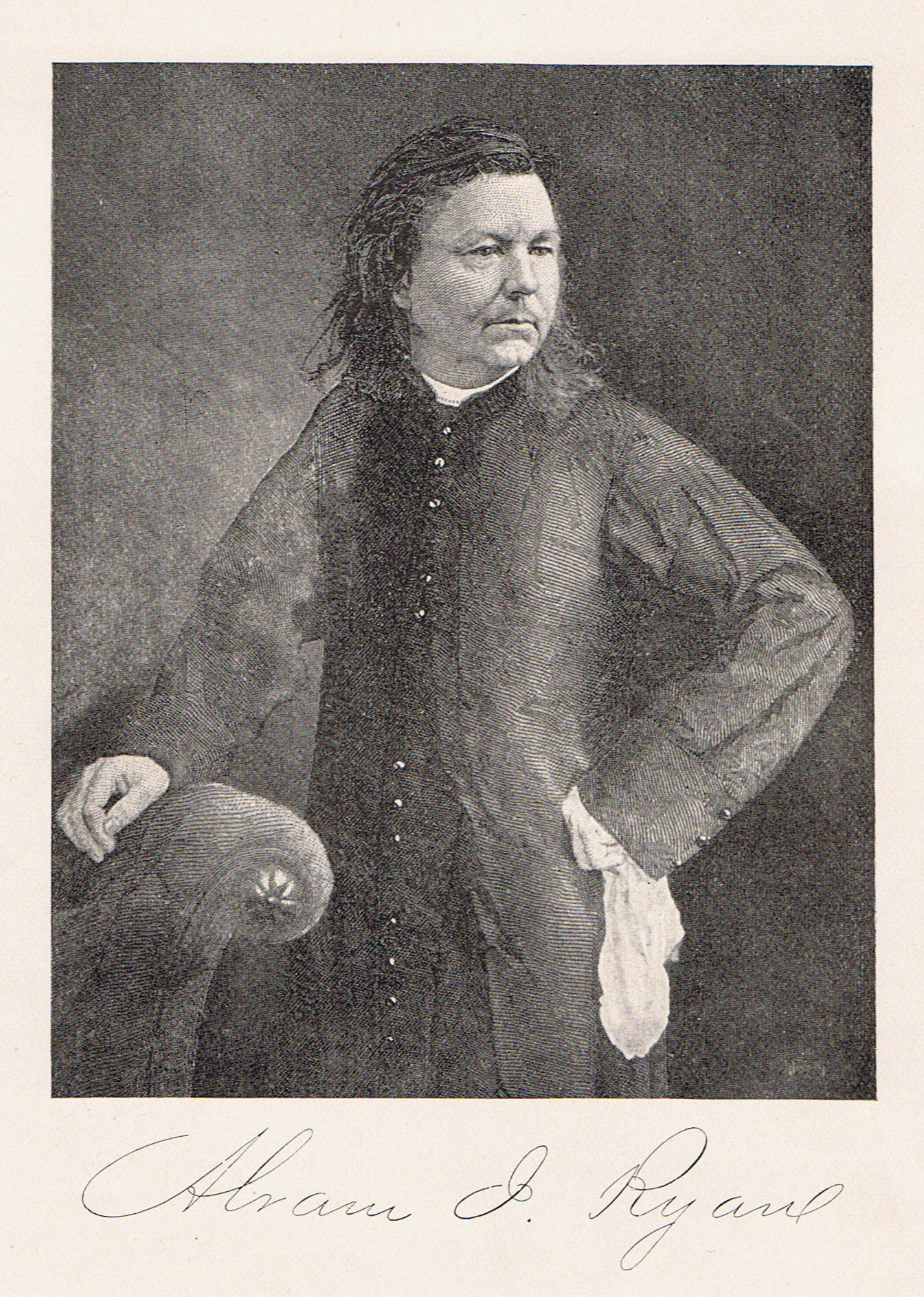
Ryan portrait and signature

On June 24, 1865, his most famous poem, "The Conquered Banner", appeared in the pages of the New York Freeman's Journal over his early pen-name "Moina". Because the same pen-name had been used by the southern balladeer Anna Dinnies, the anthologist William Gilmore Simms mistakenly attributed "The Conquered Banner" to her, prompting the Freeman's Journal to reprint the poem over Ryan's name a year later. Published only months after General Robert E. Lee surrendered at Appomattox, "The Conquered Banner" captured the spirit of sentimentality and martyrdom then rising in the South. Its metrical measure was taken, he once told a friend, from one of the Gregorian hymns. Within months, it was being recited or sung everywhere from parlors.

Starting in 1865, near the war's end, Ryan moved from parish to parish throughout the South, moving from a brief posting in Clarksville, Tennessee (November 1864-March 1865), with subsequent stays in Knoxville (April 1865-December 1867), Augusta Georgia (January 1868-April 1870), and a lengthier tenure in Mobile, Alabama (June 1870-October 1880). He then spent a year in semi-retirement at Biloxi, Mississippi (November 1881-October 1882) while completing his second book, A Crown for Our Queen.

In Augusta, Georgia, in March 1868, Ryan founded The Banner of the South, with the approval of Bishop Augustin Verot of Savannah, Georgia, a religious and political weekly in which he additionally republished much of his early poetry, along with poetry by fellow-southerners James Ryder Randall, Paul Hamilton Hayne, and Sidney Lanier, as well as an early story by Mark Twain. Though opposing women suffrage as "folly", Ryan's newspaper was notable for publishing submissions by a number of period women authors, including three poems by Alice Cary, and for his oft-quoted editorial supporting greater appreciation of the role of women in the study of history and literature. Ryan remained editor of The Banner of the South until 1870. According to David O'Connell, Bishop "Verot dismissed Ryan from his editorial functions in March 1870, and then banished him from the diocese altogether" due to Ryan's continued contentious editorials against "real and imagined foes", with a chief area of concern being "Ryan's opposition to Reconstruction acts, including voting rights for blacks."

In June 1870, Ryan received an appointment to the Diocese of Mobile, and he began his priestly duties there. On June 23, 1870, Ryan gave the baccalaureate address at Springhill College in Mobile. While still living in Mobile, in January 1871, Ryan was added to the editorial force of The Morning Star and Catholic Messenger, the official paper of the Catholic Archdiocese of New Orleans. In February 1872, Ryan became its editor-in-chief. Ryan's contributions to this newspaper included poetic, religious, and political writings. Ryan remained editor-in-chief until 1875.

He continued to write poems in the Lost Cause style for the next two decades. Among the more memorable are "C.S.A.", "The Sword of Robert E. Lee", and "The South". All centered on themes of heroic martyrdom by men pledged to defend their native land against a tyrannical invader. As one line goes, "There's grandeur in graves, there's glory in gloom." Within the limits of the Southern Confederacy and the Catholic Church in the United States, no poet was more popular. Ryan also penned a large number of verses about his faith and spirituality, such as "The Seen and the Unseen" and "Sea Dreamings", which reached a nationwide audience in The Saturday Evening Post (January 13, 1883, p. 13). In 1879, Ryan's work was gathered into a collected volume of verse, first titled Father Ryan's Poems and subsequently republished in 1880 as Poems: Patriotic, Religious, Miscellaneous. His collection sold remarkably well for the next half-century, going through more than forty reprintings and editions by the late 1930s. Ryan's work also found a popular following in his family's ancestral home of Ireland. An article about his work appeared in Irish Monthly during his life, and a decade after his death, yet another collection of his poetry was published in Dublin by The Talbot Press under the title Selected Poems of Father Abram Ryan.

== Editorials related to African Americans ==
As editor of The Banner of the South and later as editor at The Morning Star and Catholic Messenger, Ryan made numerous statements related to African Americans. For example, Ryan described African Americans in the following ways:

- While arguing that African Americans should not be allowed to vote, Ryan referred to African Americans as "the vile herd of ignorant Voudooists."
- While describing the South's ongoing difficulties during Reconstruction, Ryan wrote about "the ruin, desolation, and Negro lawlessness which now prevails in the South."
- While lamenting the plight of the former white Confederate "Patriot", Ryan wrote, "The Patriot ... has seen an ignorant and inferior race [African Americans] elevated to political equality with himself and his brethren of the white race."
- While describing the Fourth of July in Mobile, Alabama, in 1870, Ryan wrote, "Last Monday, the glorious Fourth was celebrated here – by no one save the Negroes; and even they evinced very little enthusiasm, beyond a march for a few hours, – a few fights, much drinking and now and then a stupid hurrah for – they knew not what. I was delighted to see the Star Spangled Banner upheld by ebony hand and floating over its dear colored children. The flag was in its fitting place; – unworthy now to be borne by the hand of Southern man. ... It is well that it should become the exclusive possession of a race whose rare characteristics are stupidity and ignorance."
- While discussing the racial demographics of the South, Ryan refers to African Americans as "the negro element" and to their political strength as "the virus of negro misrule."

Additionally, Ryan described the experience of slavery in the United States in the following ways: "With African slavery the failure to do the day's work entailed nothing but a whipping;" and "Negro slavery was fat and sleek, it was well cared for in sickness and old age."

Ryan also responded to the efforts of General Beauregard and others in the Louisiana Unification Movement to bring integration and reconciliation to the South. Ryan wrote: "We protest against that particular resolution of the meeting which endorses and recommends the indiscriminate mingling of white and colored children in the same institutions of education. It is against the custom of the Church in the South. ... Would General Beauregard, who is a Catholic as well as a Southern man, would he allow a child of his to go to school and associate there on terms of equality as a scholar with colored children? ... Now, if we so oppose the public schools on account of the dangers to faith and morals, will not the danger to morals increase the more when white and colored children frequent these schools God alone knows what would be the consequences of such a state of things."

Moreover, Ryan espoused beliefs concerning racial inequality, white supremacy, white-only voting rights, and white-only government:

- While responding to people who believed in the equality of all people and races, Ryan wrote, "There are bad men in all classes of society. And these men would elevate the Negro to a social and political equality with the white people of this country. And for what purpose? Not that they love the Negro, but to satiate a miserable greed for office, and to promote their own selfish aims and ends."
- Ryan also wrote, "We hold that the White Race is superior to the Black, as a general principle, and that the Government of the United States and its several subordinate State and Municipal Governments belong to the white people of the land, as a particular principle. The first we hold is universal; the second as applicable to our country and our day. This latter is a principle which was always held sacred and maintained with earnestness and vigor, by all parties, until a few years ago, when British gold and Northern Fanaticism gave birth to Abolitionism and all its attendant isms and evils."
- Responding to the passage of the Fifteenth Amendment to the United States Constitution, Ryan wrote against the voting rights for African Americans: "If there was anything wanting to complete the infamy which must attach to the dominant part in this country, it has been supplied by the passage of the 15th Amendment bill by Congress and its required adoption by the States of the South. ... It is an infamy, because it requires an unnatural, an unjust, and an unconstitutional thing of the people. It forces them to give to Negroes not only the right to vote, but to hold offices of honor, trust, and profit."
- In a rejection of African American voting rights, Ryan wrote, "We are proud and happy to ... believe that it is the right of the white man alone to rule in this country. The main question [eligibility to vote] is one that does not admit of any compromise, for in its material aspect it simply is: Whether the earnings of the white race are to be at the mercy of an ignorant and facile horde of pauper barbarians [African Americans]."

== Ryan's speech before the White League ==
On November 19, 1874, Ryan spoke to White League and the people of New Orleans. In this speech, Ryan responded to his critics, "They [Ryan's critics] think it very strange that I, as a priest, should have anything to say upon matters which more or less pertain to the political order of society. I, as a priest in my duties, do not lose my rights of citizenship. ... if there ever comes up a question in the world as between race and race, and the interests of one race against the instincts of another, common human interests tells me, and religion does not prohibit me, I stand by the white race. ... I am responsible to my church for every word I say in regard to the moral order – but my responsibility to her goes no further." Ryan also addressed the divine commendation of white supremacy: "... if history be a manifestation of Divine Providence, it is the divine mission of the white race to march in the van of civilization to lead the entire world ... it was the pale white brow that gave to the world its philosophy, out of which the world deduces its own intellectual life. [Audience cheers]" Moreover, Ryan justified the contemporaneous recourse to violence by the White League and others: "Men by reasoning came to the conclusion of what was right and just and legitimate, and that under all laws there always existed and always will exist, the right of resistance against that which is wrong. So they not only petition but argue. But, sometimes, my friends, arguments will not reach their conclusions; sometimes arguments fall upon the ears of those who are opposed to those who argue. Sometimes, and perhaps most oftentimes, petitions may be written, but they avail nothing. What must a man do then? The bullet must reason, the rifle must reason, [the audience cheers] the cannon must reason [more cheers]. ... when tyranny can no longer be endured, rests the legitimate right to overthrow it. ... So the 14th of September was more than a day [a reference to the White League's recent violent insurrection of Liberty Place on September 14, 1874 in which the White League inflected about 100 casualties], and the deed of that day was more than a deed. ... They [United States federal government] prefer to pit ignorance against intellect, immorality against morality, and they wish to place over the white race those who neither the right nor power nor potentiality of leading any race to freedom to law, to righteousness, to glory. ... Now, according to American principles, this is no government at all, and when I make my argument, I come to the conclusion that the government is no government at all; and that in any State there exists the grand right of revolution. [Audience cheers]" As a result of this speech, "once again, Ryan was in deep trouble with a bishop, in this case, Napoleon Perche of New Orleans. A Catholic priest was supposed to refrain from direct involvement in politics, and Ryan's speech to the White Leaguers clearly violated this ban. The behind-the-scenes movement to silence Ryan was now revived, but it would take a few more months to complete his removal [as editor at The Morning Star and Catholic Messenger by Bishop Perché]."

== Later life ==
In 1880 his old restlessness returned, and he headed north for the twofold object of publishing his poems and lecturing. He spent December in Baltimore, Maryland, where his Poems: Patriotic, Religious, and Miscellaneous were republished. He also delivered his first lecture on "Some Aspects of Modern Civilization". During this visit he made his home at Loyola College. In return for the Jesuit fathers' hospitality, he gave a public poetry reading and devoted the $300 proceeds to establish a poetry medal at the college. His Baltimore lectures drew such intense public interest that he was invited to sit for a set of photographic portraits at the studio of the eminent Baltimore photographer David Bachrach. The image of Ryan at the top of this article is believed to be one of the Bachrach portraits, as well as is the portrait on the cover of the 2008 biography of Ryan, Poet of the Lost Cause, from the University of Tennessee Press. These became so popular that Bachrach ran a classified advertisement in the Baltimore Sun recommending photographs of Ryan as Christmas gifts. In November 1882, Ryan returned to the north for an extended lecture tour that included appearances in Boston, New York, Montreal, Kingston, and Providence, Rhode Island. Contrary to an earlier biographical article which termed this tour unsuccessful, recent research into period newspapers shows that Ryan's lecture tours of 1882-83 were phenomenally popular, with newspapers in every city Ryan visited describing packed houses and thunderous ovations. In June 1883, he accepted an invitation to recite his poem "The Sword of Robert Lee" at a ceremony marking the unveiling of Lee's statue on the campus of Washington and Lee University, and the same month, delivered the commencement address at the University of Virginia in Charlottesville.

Ryan died April 22, 1886, at a Franciscan friary in Louisville, Kentucky, but his body was returned to St. Mary's in Mobile for burial. He was interred in Mobile's Old Catholic Cemetery. In recognition of his loyal service to the Confederacy, a stained glass window was placed in the Confederate Memorial Hall in New Orleans, Louisiana, in his memory. "The Mobile Register began promoting the idea of putting up a monument in Mobile to honor Ryan." As a result of this effort, a statue of Ryan was dedicated in July 1913. The statue included a stanza from "The Conquered Banner" below an inscription that reads: "Poet, Patriot, and Priest."

== Legacy and tributes ==
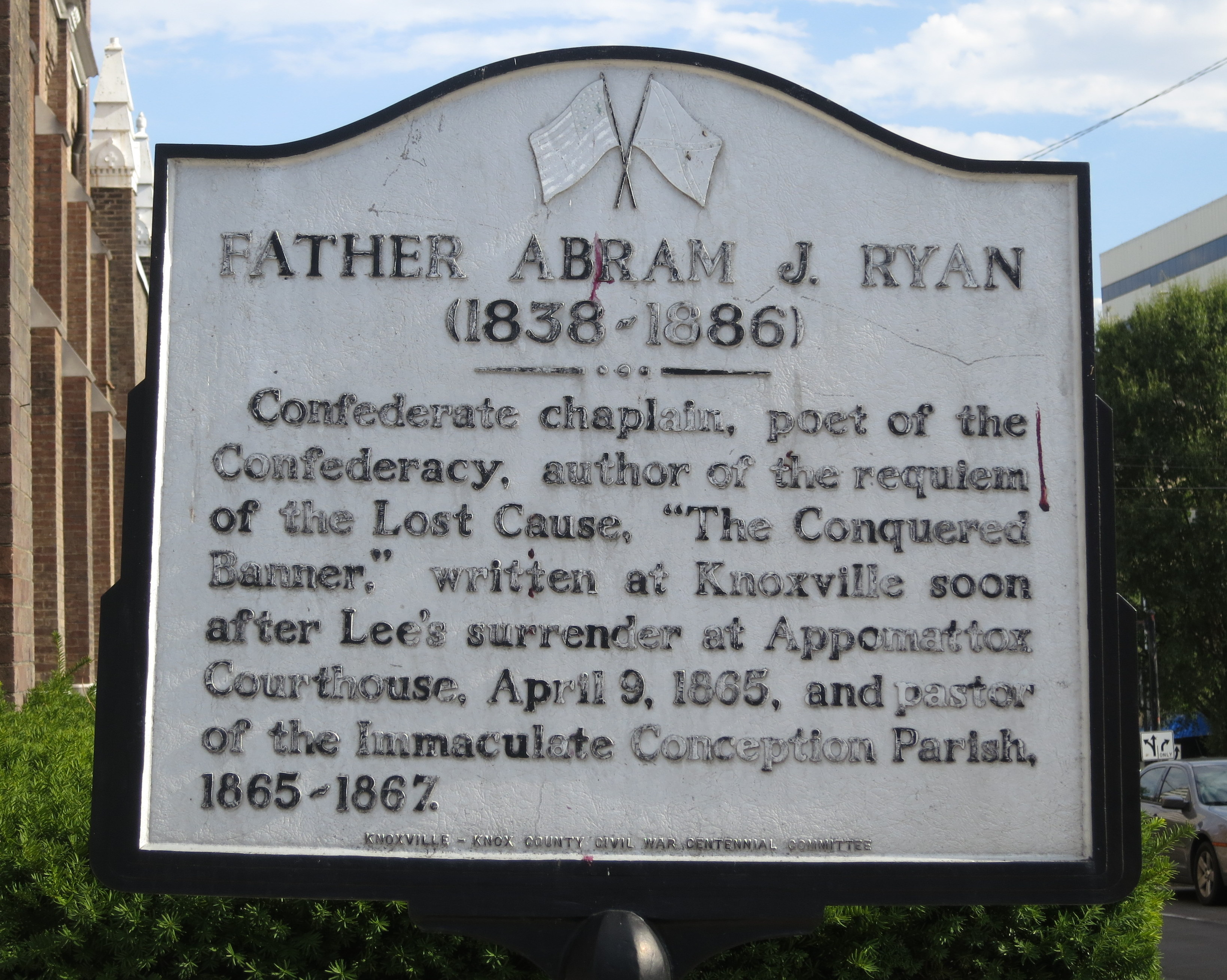
Historical marker at Immaculate Conception Church (Knoxville, Tennessee)

Ryan's poetic verses appealed to Southern post-Civil War and Lost Cause feelings and were used to "adorn the southern monuments and memorials that would dot the region's landscape". Besides "poet-priest of the South", he was also "widely recognized as the Poet of the Confederacy". and he is marked as "Poet of the Confederacy" on the historical marker near his former house in Biloxi.

- A city of Norfolk historic marker notes that his boyhood home stood nearby.
- A memorial plaque has been erected at his former parish, Immaculate Conception Church, in Knoxville, Tennessee.
- Father Ryan High School in Nashville, Tennessee, is named for him.
- A statue of Ryan was erected in Ryan Park in Mobile, Alabama, and unveiled on 1913-07-13. The park itself is bounded by Spring Hill Avenue, St Michael Street, and Scott Street.
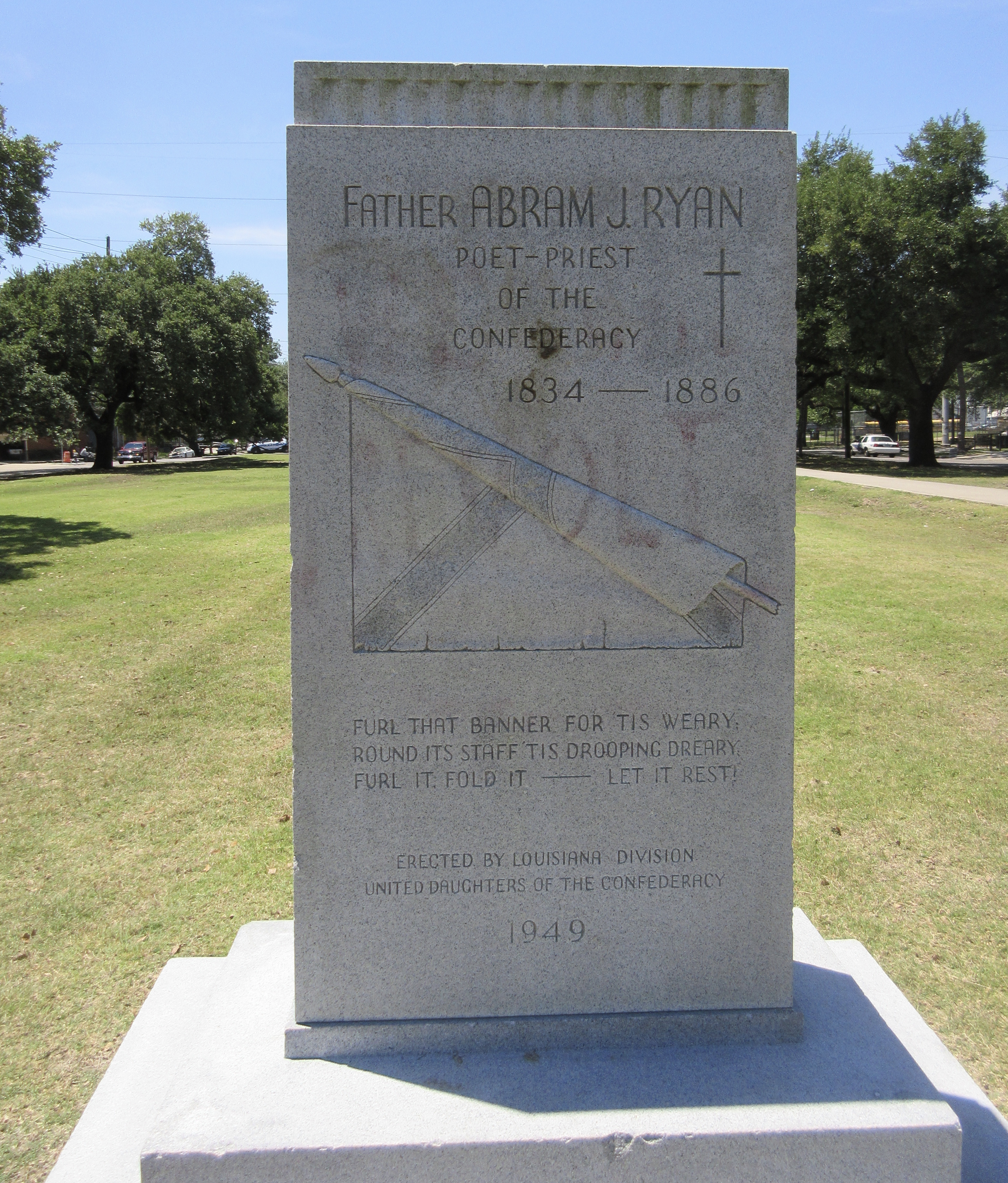
- Abram Ryan Monument, Mid-City, New Orleans in May 2017 (erected in 1949)
  Father Ryan is commemorated on the Four Southern Poets Monument in Augusta, Georgia, along with Sidney Lanier, Paul Hamilton Hayne, and James Ryder Randall
- There is a stained glass window at the Confederate Museum in New Orleans, as well as a stone monument on Jefferson Davis Parkway which was erected by the Louisiana Division of the United Daughters of the Confederacy in 1949
- There is a stained glass window depicting Father Ryan alongside Bryant, Whittier, and Longfellow in the O'Neill room of Bapst Library, Boston College.
- A stained glass window was donated by the United Daughters of the Confederacy in 1909 in honor of Father Ryan to Sacred Heart Catholic Church in Tampa, Florida.
- A stained glass window was donated by the Children of the Confederacy in 1929 in honor of Ryan at St. Mary's Catholic Church in Mobile, Alabama.
- On 1932-10-09 a memorial fountain for Ryan was presented by the Robert E Lee chapter of the U.D.C. to the Julia Ideson Public Library in downtown Houston Texas.
- There is a memorial plaque along Hwy. 90 in Biloxi, MS, remembering Abram Ryan - it is a "vacation" bungalow which he erected and lived in during his semi-retirement after the Civil War, circa 1860s.
- Ryan's memorial gravesite, located in the Catholic Cemetery in Mobile, Alabama, is set in its own area with a large Eucharistic Cross, various plaques, benches, and a flagstaff flying the papal flag. As recorded on one of the plaques at the gravesite, beginning in 2014, the papal flag is being maintained "in perpetuity" by The Fr. Abram J. Ryan Assembly #1087 of the Fourth Degree Knights of Columbus in Dallas, Texas, with "the approval of the Catholic Archdiocese of Mobile." Another plaque quotes Ryan's poem, "The Conquered Banner", and was donated by the Sons of the Confederate Veterans in 1966.

== In literature ==
Ryan is mentioned in Margaret Mitchell's novel, Gone with the Wind: "Father Ryan, the poet-priest of the Confederacy, never failed to call [at Melanie's home] when passing through Atlanta. He charmed gatherings there with his wit and seldom needed much urging to recite his 'Sword of Lee' or his deathless 'Conquered Banner,' which never failed to make the ladies cry."

== Selected works ==
- Father Ryan's Poems. Mobile, J. L. Rapier & co., 1879.
- Poems: patriotic, religious, miscellaneous. Baltimore, J. B. Piet, 1880.
- A Crown for Our Queen. Baltimore, 1882. Reprinted 2010.

== See also ==
- Charles Todd Quintard

== Bibliography ==
- Poet of the Lost Cause: A Life of Father Ryan, by Donald Robert Beagle & Bryan Albin Giemza, The University of Tennessee Press, 2008. ISBN 1-57233-606-4
- The Fr. Abram J. Ryan Archive at Belmont Abbey College, includes images, unpublished manuscripts and more. http://crusader.bac.edu/library/rarebooks/Ryanfiles/
