= Church of the Immaculate Conception (Knoxville, Tennessee) =

Catholic church in Knoxville, Tennessee, US

Coordinates: 35.9671°N 83.9217°W

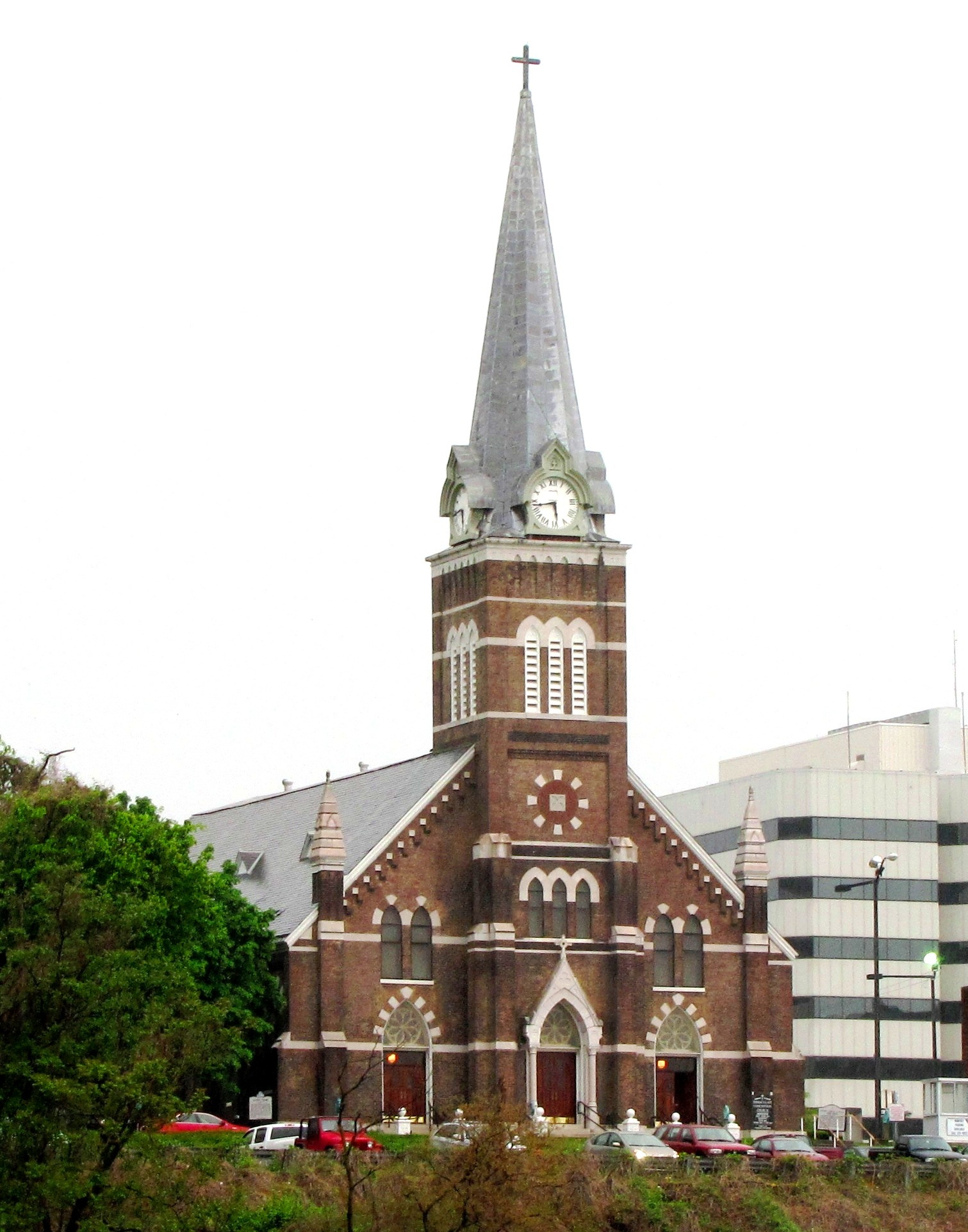
Church of the Immaculate Conception in 2010

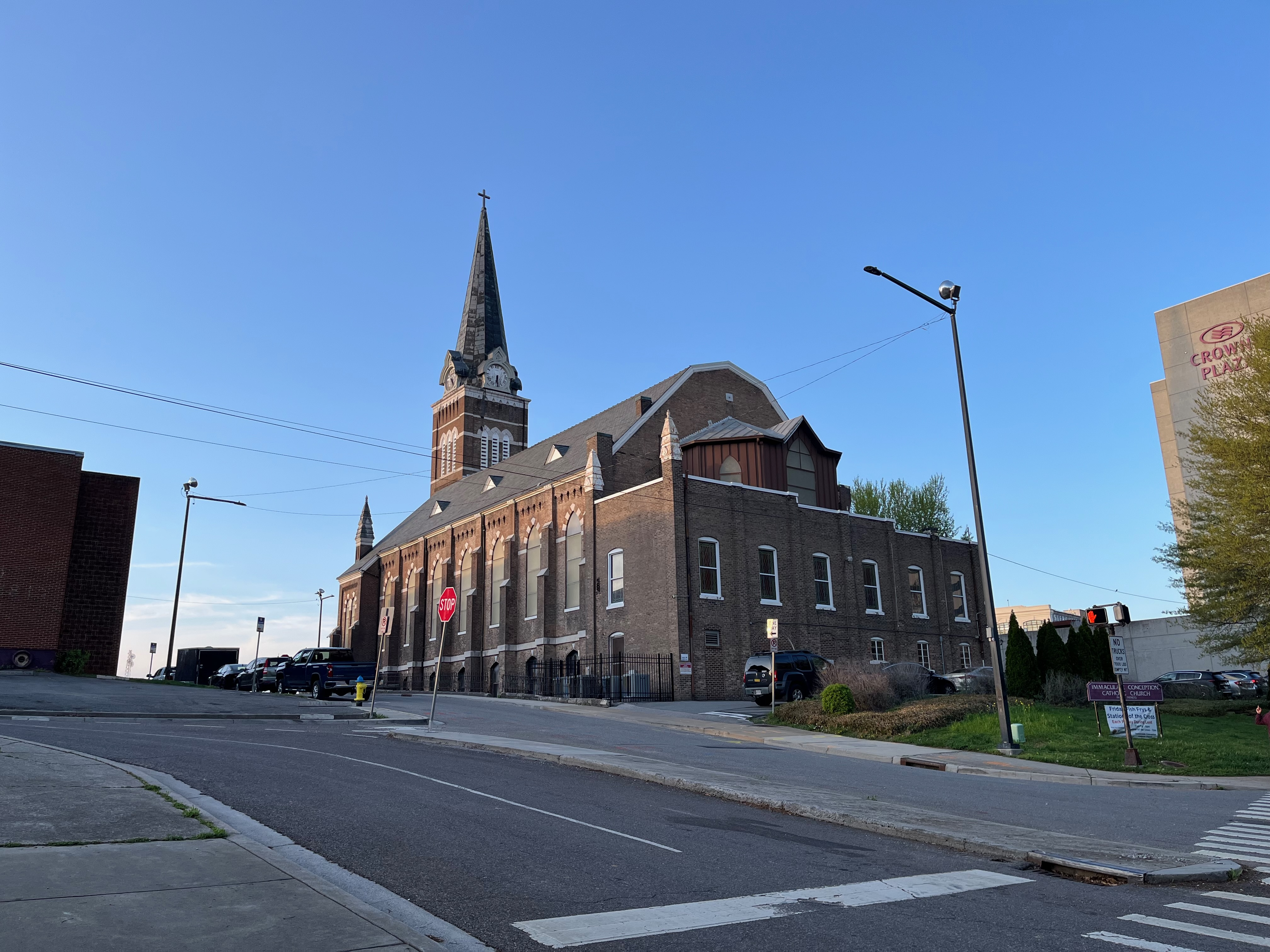
Rear of the church in 2025

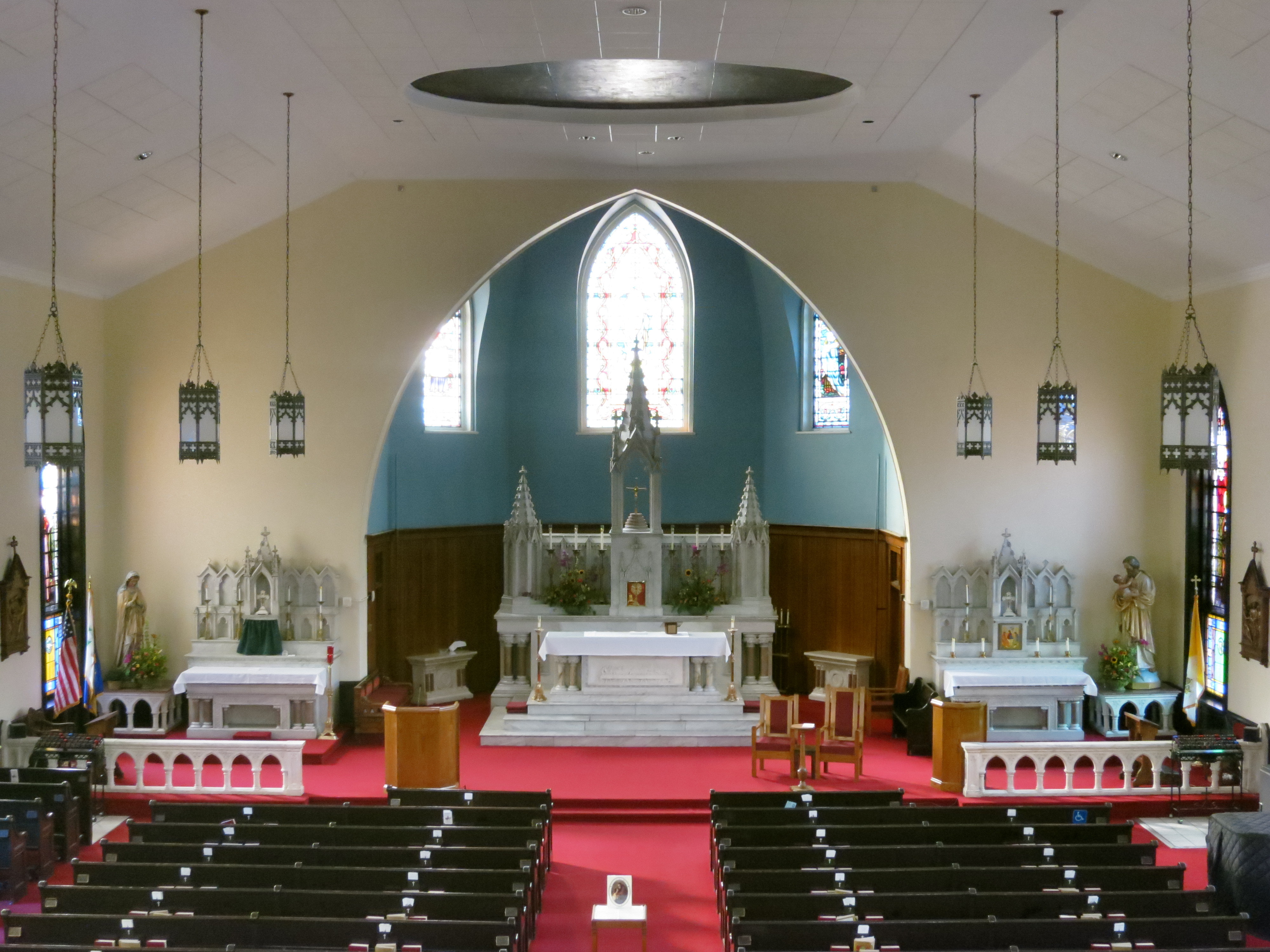
Interior in 2016

The Church of the Immaculate Conception is a historic Catholic church located at 414 West Vine on Summit Hill in Knoxville, Tennessee.

== History ==
Knoxville was home to a small Catholic congregation by the early 1800s. Father Stephen Badin traveled to the city on several occasions to visit this congregation. Railroad construction in the late 1840s and early 1850s brought scores of Irish immigrant laborers to the city, considerably boosting the congregation's numbers. The Church of the Immaculate Conception, the city's first Catholic parish, was founded in 1855 on the site of the current church. The name of the church was inspired by Pope Pius IX's elevation of Immaculate Conception to official church doctrine the previous year.

Father Abram Joseph Ryan (1836–1886), the Poet-Priest of the Confederacy, was once a priest at this parish. He was the author of the Requiem of the Lost Cause, The Conquered Banner, written soon after the surrender at Appomattox.

The existing church sanctuary was constructed in 1886, in front of the earlier building. The brick church was designed by Joseph Baumann, who along with George Franklin Barber was one of Knoxville's first major professional architects. The church was designed in the Victorian Gothic style of architecture. The sanctuary is two stories tall, with a central clock tower in a turreted spire.

The church remains a Roman Catholic parish in the downtown portion of the city. However, Sacred Heart Cathedral in the west Knoxville community of Bearden is the seat of the Catholic Bishop.
