= Journalism culture =

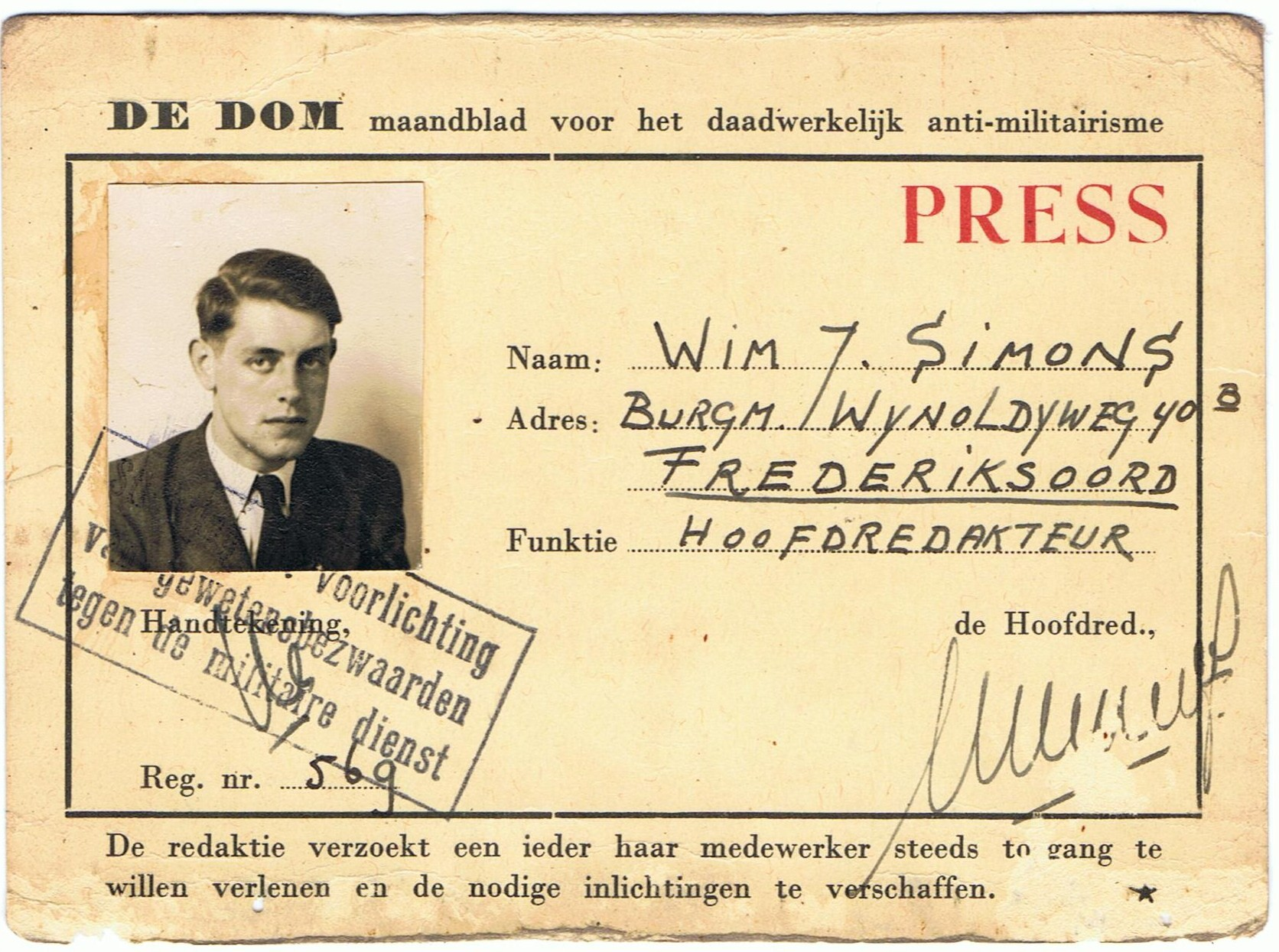
Press card of Wim Simons, De Dom, 1948

Journalism culture is described as a "shared occupational ideology among newsworkers". The term journalism culture spans the cultural diversity of journalistic values, practices and media products or similar media artifacts. Research into the concept of journalism culture sometimes suggests an all-encompassing consensus among journalists "toward a common understanding and cultural identity of journalism."

There is scientific debate about the notion of a shared, worldwide journalism culture, whether such a common construct exists and can be found empirically. Several communication science studies were conducted for finding a hypothetic common Western journalism culture, a common European journalism culture, or even a common global journalism ideology. (cf. historical overview) Research into journalism cultures is especially helpful in analyzing assumed influences of globalization, indicated by world-spanning major media corporations, on individual media cultures and its worldwide standard-setting potency. In scientific literature, journalism culture is also called "journalistic culture", "news culture", "newspaper cultures" or "culture of news production".

== Types of cultures ==
A worldwide study on journalism culture conducted by Thomas Hanitzsch et al. between 2007 and 2011 encompassing 21 countries found that journalistic functions like detachment, non-involvement, providing political information and monitoring the government are perceived as essential journalistic virtues worldwide.

The four types of journalism cultures found in the Worlds of Journalism study through worldwide surveys of over 2100 active journalists regarding the "central areas of [journalistic] disagreement" (journalistic interventionism, distance to ruling powers, and their market orientation) are:

| Journalistic milieu | Specifics of journalism culture |
|---|---|
| Populist disseminator | Has a strong orientation towards the audience. Tendency to provide the audience with "interesting" information. Not very critical of government or elites. Yet does not intend to take on an active and participatory role in reporting. Example countries: Spain, Romania, Israel. |
| Detached watchdog | Interest in providing the audience with political information. Relative high regard to their position as detached observer of events. See themselves as watchdogs of elites (skeptical and critical attitude). Less interventionist than their counterparts in other milieus. Opposed to the idea of supporting official policies. Least likely to advocate for social change, influence public opinion and set the political agenda. Most ‘prototypical’ milieu of western journalist. Example countries: Germany, Austria, United States, Switzerland, Australia. |
| Critical change agent | Driven by interventionist intentions. Critical towards government and business elites. Emphasis on advocating social change, influencing public opinion or setting political agenda. Eager to motivate audiences to participate in civic activity (elections) and political discussion, yet strongly opposed to providing public support for official government policy. Does not support opportunist approach to journalism. Example countries: Turkey, Egypt. In parts Bulgaria, Mexico and Indonesia. |
| Opportunist facilitator | Journalists do not perceive themselves as detached observers, are constructive partners of the government. They are most likely to support official policies and convey a positive image of political and business leadership and pay least regard to the political information function or the mobilization potentials of journalism. At close distance to political powers. No watchdogs of government or elites. Found in developing, transitional and authoritarian contexts. Country examples: Russia, Chile, China, Uganda. |

=== Western journalism culture ===
Compared to Southern, Eastern or less democratic countries like China and Russia, additional virtues like impartiality, the reliability and factualness of information and adherence to universal ethical principles are perceived to be of great importance for Western journalists. Additionally, the study found Western journalists to be less supportive of any active promotion of particular values, ideas or social change.

Western journalism culture is classified by a dominance of watchdog journalism with a tendency of more South-Western democracies like Spain additionally harboring a strong journalistic culture of "populist disseminator".

=== Tendencies in developing and emerging nations ===
Especially in the 1990s "US government and media initiatives" have worked to establish a US-modeled "objective" press model in emerging democracies in South America and Eastern Europe. This move assumed "US-style journalism [to be] a natural and inevitable world model", yet current studies regarding journalism culture in Eastern European countries do not see a natural adoption of Western journalism standards. Instead, the establishment of a less objective and more entertainment- and audience-oriented journalistic culture driven by the countries themselves (e.g. "populist disseminator" journalism in Bulgaria) can be observed.

Within-country level journalism research in developing or emerging countries is described as lacking. This can either be explained with under-financed or non-existent research institutes within the respective countries or the neglect of certain research topics. Arnold S. de Beer, journalism researcher at Stellenbosch University, South Africa, is criticizing South African journalism research of the 90s and early 2000s as both too focused on areas like "public relations, marketing or other forms of corporate communication" and, on the side of the critical researchers, as having a too strong interest in journalism research of post-Apartheid specifics. This overpopulation with specific-interest studies created a deficit in South African conclusions about their own journalism culture.

== Research ==
Research of journalism culture is a sub-theme of journalism research, a tradition rooted in both classical sociological approaches (e.g. Émile Durkheim, Georg Simmel, Robert E. Park, Talcott Parsons and Niklas Luhmann) and Humanities of the early 20th century and is located in the broader area of media science and communication science. Journalism studies take into account many levels of analysis including individual, organizational, societal and cultural aspects.

=== Study design and methods ===
Study design for journalism culture research provides challenges for appropriate methodological operationalization. Its complexity arises due to journalistic professionalism being a multi-leveled concept consisting of various journalistic values, tenets, and practices, which different journalism cultures balance in their own unique ways. Research in journalism culture can be conducted within one nation, mostly led by journalism researchers originating from the country itself, or in a comparative manner cross-nationally conducted with the help of international teams of researchers. Comparative journalism research is fore-mostly conducted cross-nationally, with "nation" being an important level of analysis, resulting in comparative studies on country-by-country basis. Derived from comparative media system research, comparative journalism culture research uses the nation as "object, context, unit of analysis, or as component of a larger system".

Used methods in journalism culture research are surveys and interviews, content analysis, observation or a combination thereof.

=== Levels of analysis ===
Using the dimensions of analysis system suggested by Brüggeman and Wessler, media research can be conducted using three dimensions of analysis: (1) Research perspectives, (2) research levels and (3) objects of analysis. Practically applying this system on journalism culture research shows:

1. The use of "comparison" as prevalent research perspective
2. The use of "state/society" (nation) as dominant level of analysis
3. The use of various and often combined objects of analysis

The combination of various objects of analysis, such as "media structures", "content production" and "media contents" is explained in the complex nature of the "culture" aspect in journalism culture. As communication researcher Hanitzsch puts it: "One can generally speak of culture as a set of ideas (values, attitudes, and beliefs), practices (of cultural production), and artifacts (cultural products, texts)."

=== Historical overview of research ===
Notable comparative research can be found in Weaver's 1998 The Global Journalist, Sigal's 1973 Reporters and Officials: The Organization and Politics of Newsmaking comparing reporting practices in the United States and Great Britain, the journalism-focused parts of Hallin and Mancini's 2004 Comparing Media Systems: Three Models of Media and Politics and Hanitzsch’ 2011 Worlds of Journalism Project. Rosten's 1937 Washington Correspondents is considered the first study to describe journalists’ work lives. More recent comparative research into journalism and journalism culture also include works by Deuze, Donsbach and Splichal & Sparks.

Theoretical and practical research has found many journalism cultures and ideologies discussed in communication science literature. Among them are journalism cultures and genres such as watchdog journalism, civic journalism, popular journalism or advocacy journalism characterized by its strong use of journalistic interventionism.

=== Criticism of research ===
Many, especially emerging nations, criticize the form of applying a US- or Western-centric view of journalistic culture onto under- or developing nations as a form of cultural imperialism neglecting specific cultural backgrounds or social cleavages. Additionally, journalism research is often criticized as employing a too traditional view of "journalism". Most journalism studies still focus on established and institutionalized journalism in newspaper, television or radio. Journalism researchers are struggling with comparative methods of conceptualizing emerging and new media, like journalism in weblogs, podcasts or other versions of citizens’ journalism. Beside these specific points of criticism there is a general methodological problem defining the concept of "culture". The term culture is often used unsystematically and can lead to problems of congruent comparison of journalism culture studies.

== Influences on cultures ==
=== Influences on European journalism cultures ===
The Adequate Information Management in Europe (AIM) Project, a multinational European social science project conducting several studies on journalism structures and processes of daily reporting about the European Union between 2004 and 2007, found that impulses for European professional journalism are not found in an explicit interest in European topics or special knowledge concerning European matters, as assumed. Rather, they are determined by "day to day operations and subsequent media performance", structural on-site factors, or "on-the-job and trial-and-error" practices. Furthermore, reporting about Europe is determined by national views and national and individual journalistic practices and thus lacking coherence and proper context. The AIM study concludes that these daily deficiencies, neglects and misapprehensions lead to myopic reporting about European matters. The theory of a common European culture on reporting about European matters thus cannot be supported.

=== Influences of professional hierarchies ===
Shoemaker's and Reese's 1996 volume Mediating the Message: Theories of Influences on Mass Media established a theoretical framework for analyzing levels of influences that shape media contents. The levels range from micro to macro, going from individual, over routines, organizational level, extra-media level, to ideological level. A similar approach was used by Hanitzsch in his extensive cross-national journalism culture study Worlds of Journalism. The model used by Hanitzsch allows for influences on journalists’ reporting decisions on a super-level (globalization, diffusion and interdependence), a macro-level of societies or nations (political, economic, legal, social and cultural contexts as well as media system), a meso-level (editorial organization, the media organization and the medium as such) and the micro-level as the journalist as an individual (journalists' backgrounds and individual characteristics).

Results from the study among 2100 professional journalists found that "organizational, professional and procedural influences are perceived to be more powerful limits to the journalists' work than political and economic influences". This produces the meso-level of professional hierarchy, aka the editorial organization and medium's organization, as the most influential factor of journalistic conduct and thus the biggest influencer of the professional part of journalism culture.

=== Influence of new technologies on journalism cultures ===
The European AIM study found a growing openness, especially among younger generations of professional journalists, towards news methods and ways of communication and production. A growing tendency of not relying exclusively on institutionalized information systems can be observed. Further technological development within the world of the Internet points to a trend of increased usage of "non-institutionalized, non-governmental, non-administrative and clearly transnational information" during reporting and research work.

Besides Western journalists adopting new media as a means of reporting, a surge in new technology usage can especially be seen in authoritarian or developing nation contexts. Increased governmental controlling of journalists’ media access and/or freedom of expression can lead to the need of finding new and less controlled ways of expression. One of the best studied examples of suppressed journalists’ resourcefulness can be found in research of Chinese journalists and their use of blogs, cellphones and microblogging, shaping the contemporary Chinese reporting culture.

== Global convergence theory ==
International journalism research has produced evidence in support of the view that the ongoing trend of globalization is accompanied with a convergence in journalistic orientations and practices and thus journalism culture. Traditional ethics of objectivity and impartiality dominate many newsrooms worldwide, and many similarities in editorial procedures, professional routines, and socialization processes in countries as diverse as Brazil, Germany, Indonesia, Tanzania, and the United States can be found.

== See also ==
- German American journalism
- Irish American journalism
- Journalism school
- Watchdog Journalism
- Comparative method
- Communication studies
