= Henry Mullady =

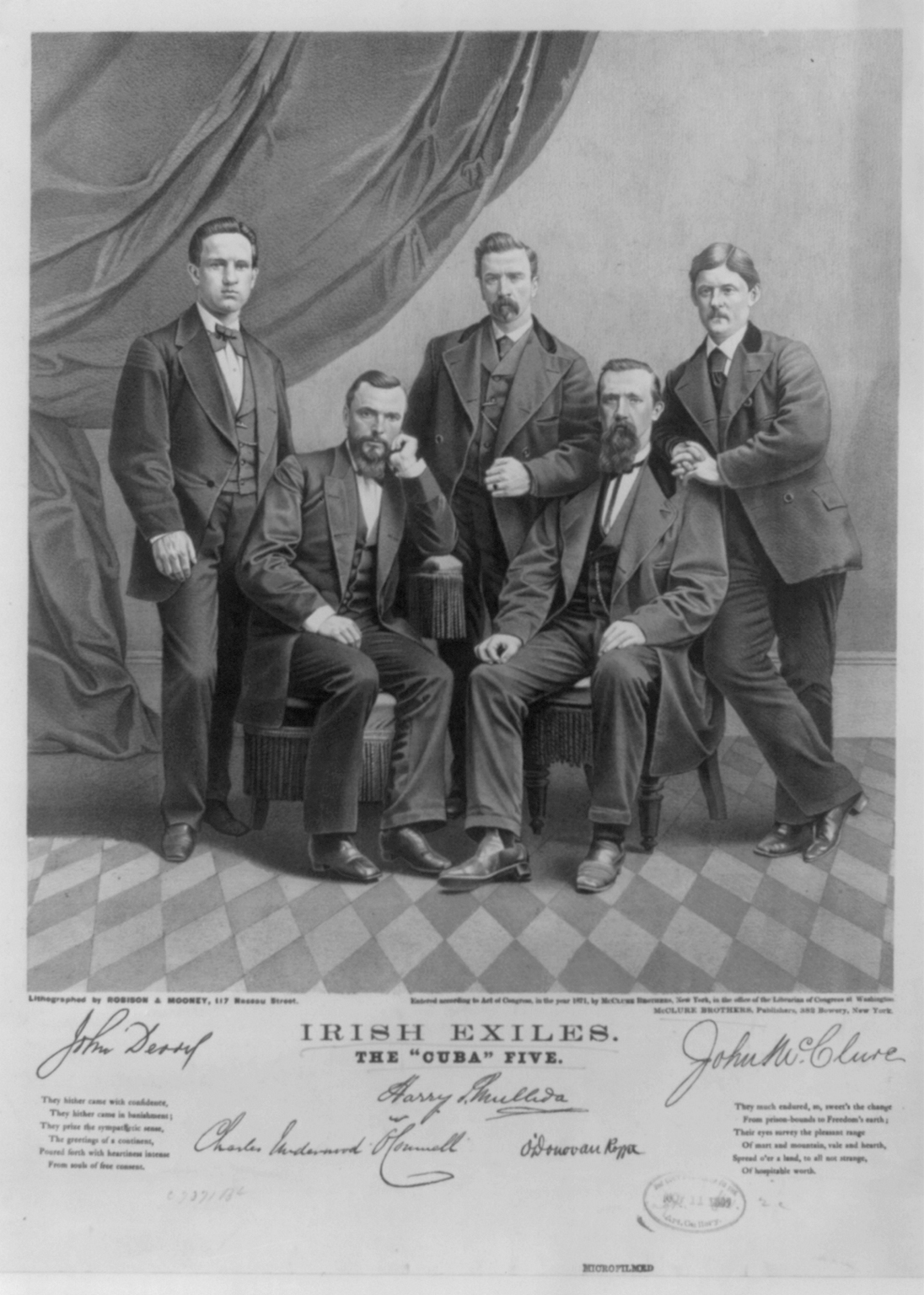
"The Cuba Five" From left to right: John Devoy, Charles Underwood O'Connell, Henry (Harry) Mullady, Jeremiah O'Donovan Rossa, and John McClure.

Henry (Harry) Mullady (a.k.a. Henry Shaw) was a Fenian activist. He was part of The Cuba Five who were exiled from the U.K. in 1871.

== History ==
He was arrested at the Ware in Dublin County, about 15 miles from Drogheda, on 7 March 1867, with two others. He was in possession of a loaded revolver and a book of letters. He remained in custody until, in February 1868, along with Ricard O'Sullivan Burke [a.k.a. George Berry, Edward C. Winslow and Wallace] and Joseph Theobald Casey (two Fenians accused of involvement in the escape of Thomas Kelly and Timothy Deasy during which a policeman was killed) he was indicted at Warwick Spring Assizes under the name he gave, 'Henry Shaw'. He was reported as being a twenty-six-year-old carpenter, an active Fenian and being able to read and write with difficulty [his surname was also variously recorded as Millady, Maleady, Mullidy and Mullida (see image)]. He was with Burke at the purchases of hundreds of rifles, pistols, revolvers and millions of percussion caps and other paraphernalia in Birmingham in 1865, with Burke and Casey in their preparations in Liverpool in 1866 and at several meetings where Fenian plans were made to raid the arsenal at Chester Castle on 11 February 1867. He had been engaged passing messages and as directed by the group's leaders.

The trial of Burke, Casey and Mullady [as 'Shaw'] at the Old Bailey was under the charge of treason-felony. Casey was acquitted, Burke sentenced to 15 years' penal servitude and Mullady, sentenced to seven years'. A general amnesty was announced at the beginning of January 1871. Mullady was released from prison on 7 January with conditions: he and four others chose the option of exile to the US. The group left Liverpool aboard the steamship Cuba. Upon the ship's arrival on 19 January, they were overwhelmed by a throng of Fenians (Thomas Kelly was secretary to the Fenian Brotherhood making the welcome) and some representatives of the U.S. Government, each in competition to receive them. Jeremiah O'Donovan Rossa read out a letter thanking all but announcing they would stay aboard for the night. Mullady's name, as Henry S. Mullady, was appended to the letter thus. The exiles became known as the Cuba Five. A collection had been made for them to start a new life, and the following day they were paraded along Broadway with an accompaniment of the 69th Infantry Regiment (the 'Irish Brigade').
