= Charles Underwood O'Connell =

Irish Fenian activist

Charles O'Connell
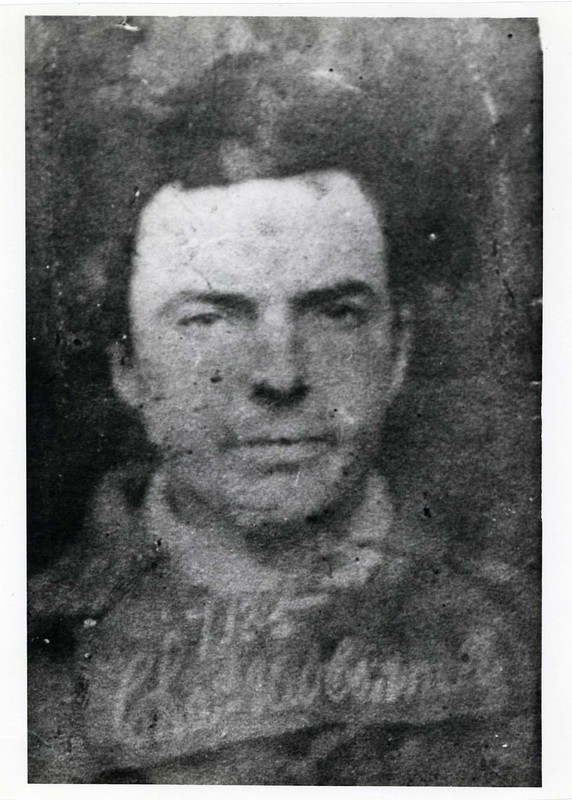
- Born: c.1839
- Died: 22 February 1902; New York
- Known for: Irish republicanism

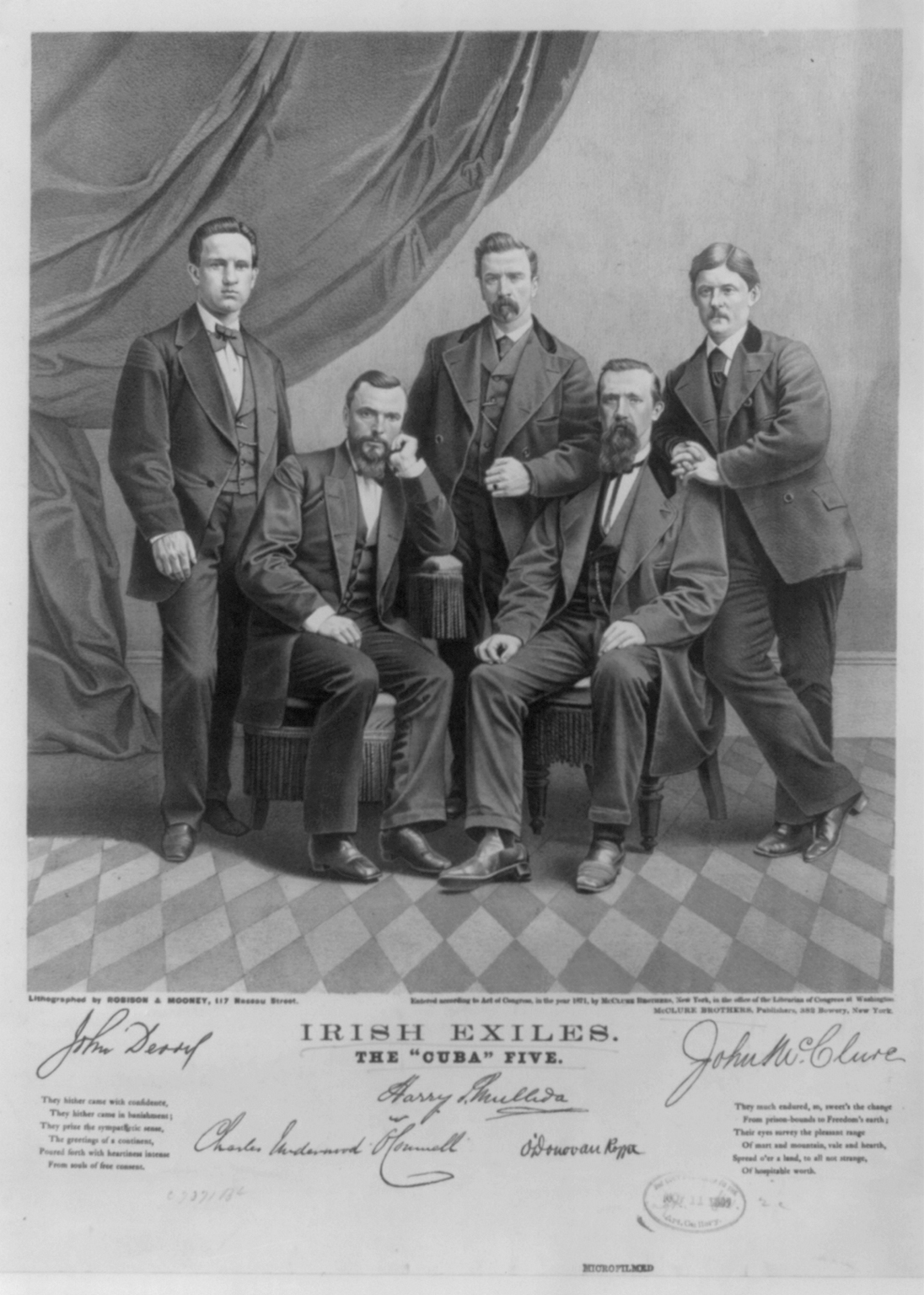
"The Cuba Five" From left to right: John Devoy, Charles Underwood O'Connell, Henry (Harry) Mullady, Jeremiah O'Donovan Rossa, and John McClure.

Charles Underwood O'Connell (1 August 1838 [on gravestone] – 22 February 1902) was a Fenian activist from County Cork, Ireland. He was part of The Cuba Five, exiled from the U.K. in 1871.

== History ==
Different sources give a birthdate from 1838 to 1840. James Stephens, the founder of the Irish Republican Brotherhood (I.R.B.) in Ireland, asked O'Connell to organise a Fenian group in his native County Cork, which numbered several thousand. He travelled to the U.S. to get military experience. With the help of the founder of the Fenian Brotherhood in the U.S., John O'Mahony, he became part of (Colonel) O'Mahony's Phoenix Brigade, the 99th Regiment New York State Militia which was mustered against the Confederacy for 100 days (and which was part of Captain Thomas Meagher's Irish Brigade). O'Connell reached the rank of captain.

Details of plans for a Fenian uprising in Ireland were inadvertently discovered and handed in to Dublin Castle, the location of British administration and headquarters of the police. Later, a document found in Stephens's newspaper, The Irish People, led to the arrest of leading Fenians and the suppression of the paper. Thereafter, many people arriving on ships from the U.S. were checked. On 20 September 1865, O'Connell was arrested on a vessel at Queenstown which was on its way to Great Britain (the U.S. Department of State (15 January 1867) named the steamer City of New York; The Morning Post (25 September 1865) said he was arrested on a tender conveying passengers to Queenstown from the National Company's vessel, Louisiana). He was found to be in possession of Fenian papers brought from the U.S. and "arms". In the Special Commission in Cork on 28 December, the Dublin police informant, Pierce Nagel, who worked at The Irish People and found the documents which led to the Fenian arrests, said he'd seen O'Connell in Mahony's office in New York. O'Connell was convicted and sentenced to 10 years at the Portland Quarries.

There was pressure from the government of the U.S. (lobbied by Fenians), particularly as some prisoners like O'Connell were U.S. citizens and army veterans. There was conditional amnesty for imprisoned Fenians on 5 January 1871. O'Connell was released on 7 January. Five of the released opted for exile to the U.S. on the condition that they were not to return to the U.K. They left Liverpool docks aboard the S.S. Cuba. They arrived at a rapturous welcome in the U.S. and were named The Cuba Five. O'Connell continued to work for causes towards Irish nationalism.

It has been suggested that he returned to Ireland to participate in Irish Race Convention in the late 1890s as a representative of the U.S., but he was not listed amongst delegates, Irish or American. He died along with fifteen others in a catastrophic fire in the Park Avenue Hotel, New York, on 22 February 1902. He was buried at Calvary Cemetery, Laurel Hill Boulevard, Flushing, New York.
