= Arnold S de Beer =

South African academic and journalist (1942–2021)

Arnoldus Stephanus de Beer
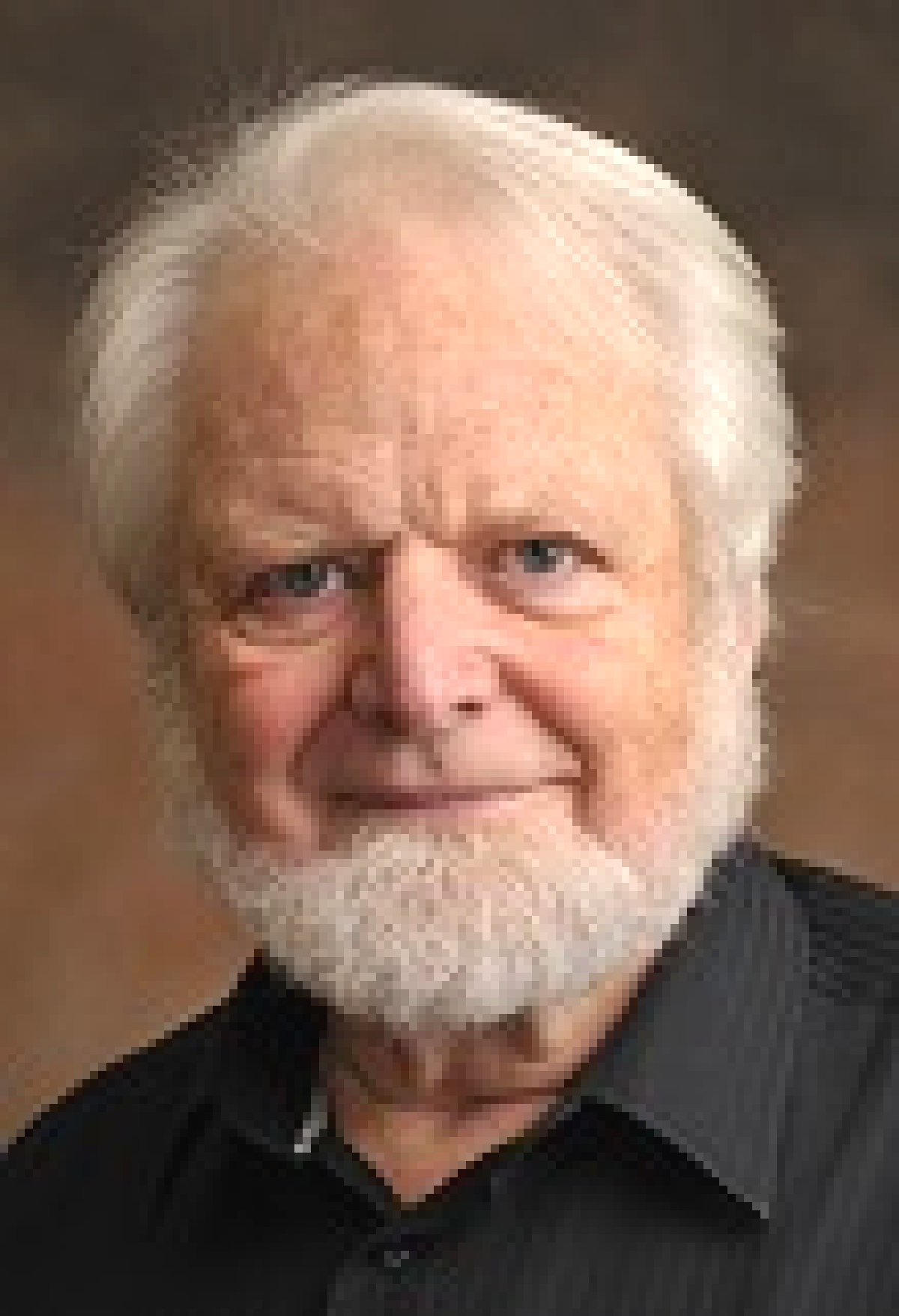
- Born: June 10, 1942; Standerton, Mpumalanga province, South Africa
- Died: October 20, 2021 (aged 79)
- Occupation: Journalist

Arnoldus Stephanus de Beer (10 June 1942 – 20 October 2021) was a South African journalist who was a Professor Extraordinary in the Department of Journalism, Stellenbosch University, South Africa. His research topics included the role of media in South African society, news flow and journalism education. Many of his English works appeared under the pen name Arnold S de Beer. Among Afrikaans colleagues and friends he was frequently known as Arrie de Beer.

== Career ==
In 1980, de Beer founded the journalism research journal Ecquid Novi, and was as founding editor on the board of the journal under the title African Journalism Studies (Routledge/T&F). He was also the editor of the 5th edition of Global Journalism – Topical Issues and Media Systems (Pearson), as well as co-editor of Worlds of Journalism – Journalistic Cultures around the Globe. He edited the first journalism handbook in Afrikaans, Joernalistiek Vandag (1982).

A former journalist with the Afrikaans newspapers Die Burger and Die Transvaler, he was editor of the Ensiklopedie van die Wêreld before moving to academia in 1974. He was head of the departments of communication at Free State University and the University of the North-West (Potchefstroom) and acting head at the University of Johannesburg (RAU).

He was a former board member of the South African Broadcasting Corporation (SABC), the public broadcaster in South Africa, and was an academic journalism representative and founding member of the South African National Editors’ Forum (Sanef) and served on its Appeals Committee for the SA Press Ombudsman.

De Beer was a co-founder and president of the South African Communication Association and was a Lifelong Fellow. In 2000 he became the first recipient of the Stals prize for journalism awarded by the Suid-Afrikaanse Akademie vir Wetenskap en Kuns.

A visiting scholar at the universities of Washington, Baylor, and Indiana-Purdue, he was also a professor extraordinary at the University of the Western Cape. Until 2019 de Beer was a member of the executive committee and African coordinator of the Worlds of Journalism Study.

== Death ==
He died on 20 October 2021.
