= Cuba Five =

Group of Irish rebels exiled to the United States

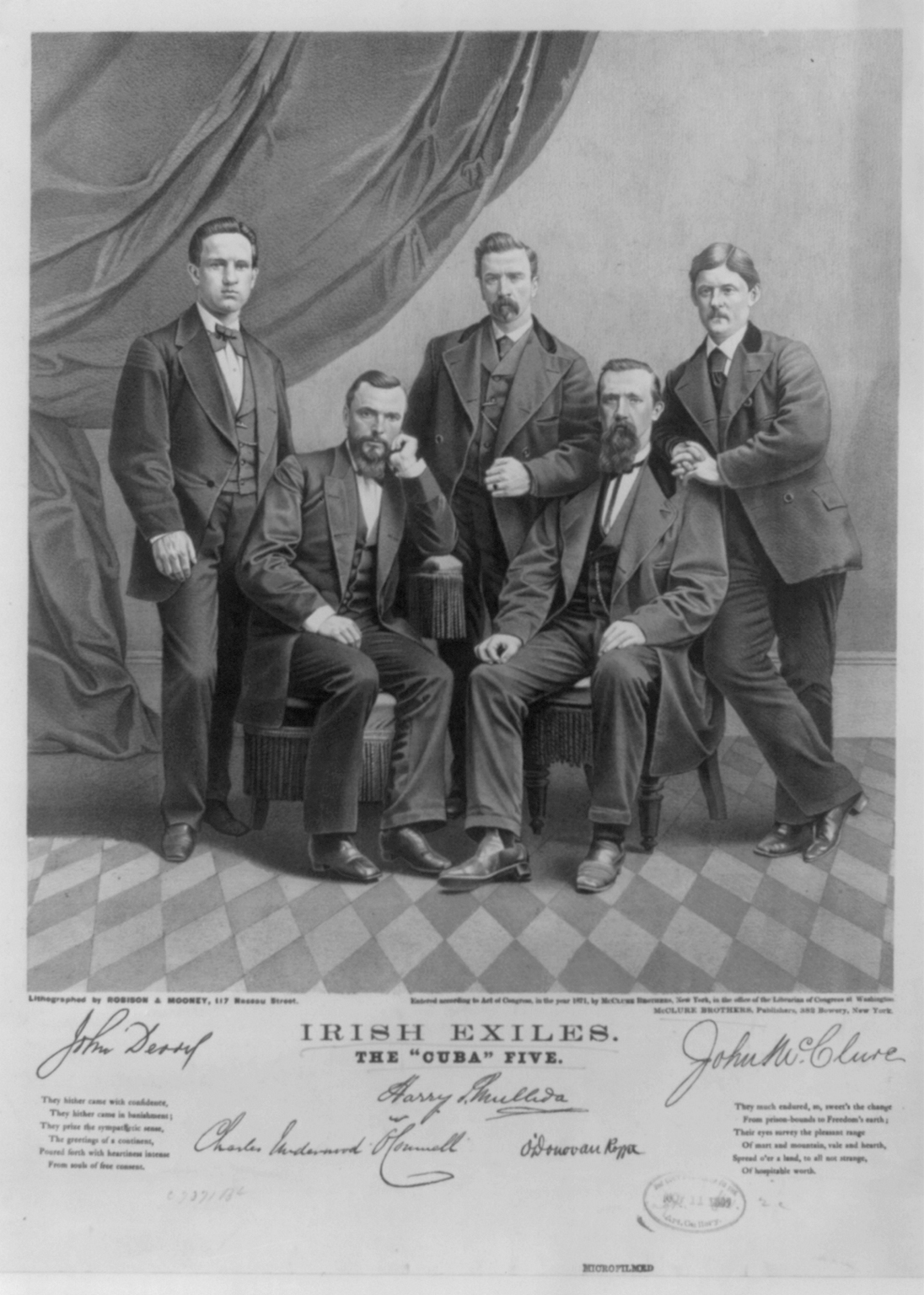
"The Cuba Five" From left to right: John Devoy, Charles Underwood O'Connell, Henry (Harry) Mulleda, Jeremiah O'Donovan Rossa, and John McClure.

The Cuba Five (Irish: An Cúigear Chúba) were a group of Irish rebels released from British prisons in 1871 on condition of not entering Britain (Ireland was then part of the United Kingdom) until the expiration of their original sentences. They chose to accept exile in the United States, travelling on board the ship SS Cuba from Liverpool docks. The five men were John Devoy, Jeremiah O'Donovan Rossa, Charles Underwood O'Connell, Henry Mullady and John McClure. On arrival in New York they received a rapturous welcome and attempted to reunite the badly split Fenian Brotherhood. In this they failed, but Devoy and O'Donovan Rossa were to go on to become probably the most outstanding members of the Fenian movement in the US in the late nineteenth and early twentieth centuries.

== Sources ==
- Terry Golway, Irish Rebel: John Devoy and America's Fight for Ireland's Freedom, St. Martin's Press, New York, 1998
