= The Conquered Banner =

1865 Confederate poem by Abram Joseph Ryan

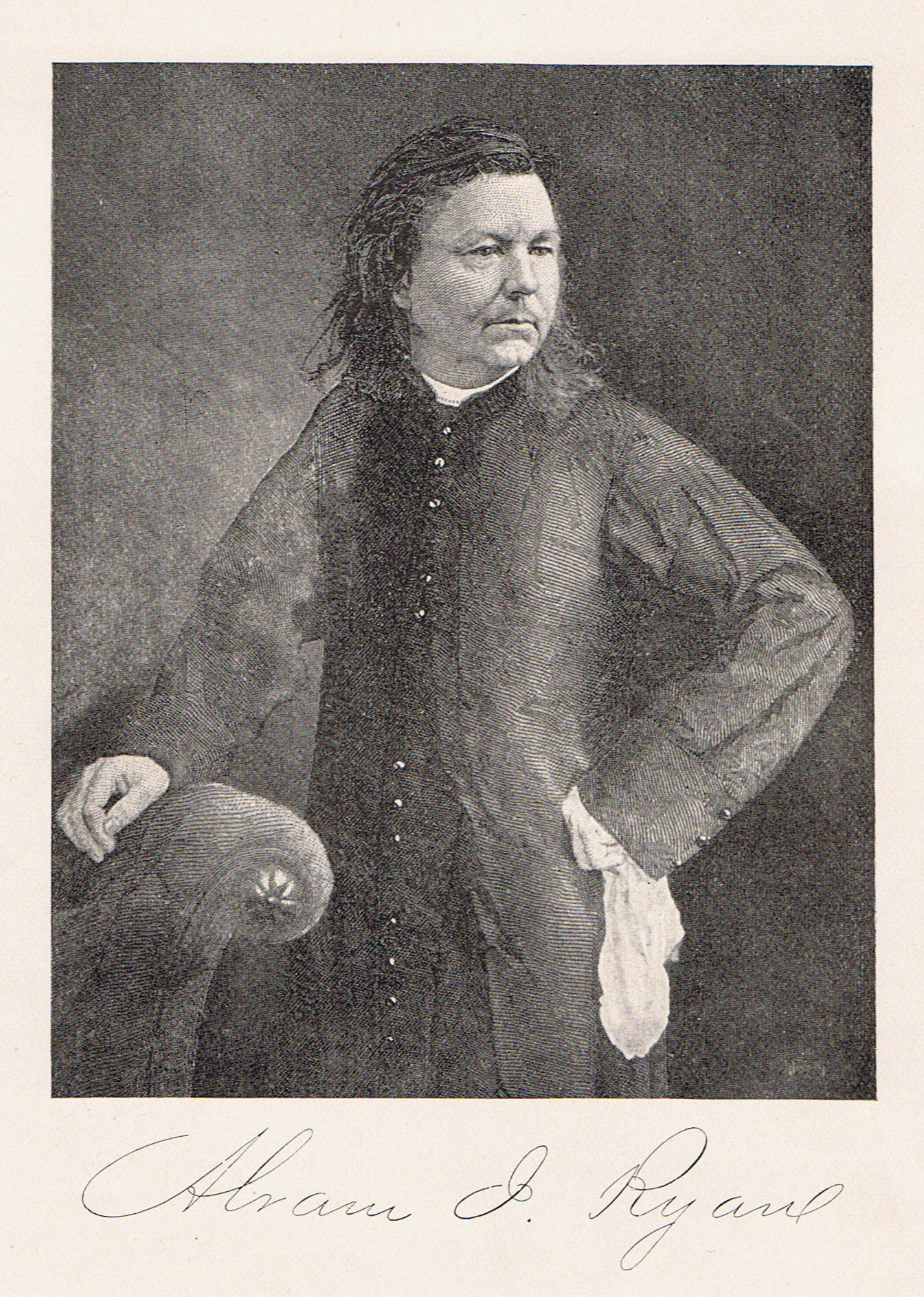
Father Ryan's portrait and signature

"The Conquered Banner" was one of the most popular of the post-Civil War Confederate poems. It was written by Father Abram Joseph Ryan, a Roman Catholic priest and Confederate Army chaplain. He has been called the "poet laureate of the postwar south" and "poet-priest of the Confederacy".

== Background ==
The poem was first published on June 24, 1865, in the New York Freeman, a pro-Confederate, Roman Catholic newspaper. Ryan published it under the pen-name "Moina". It made Father Ryan famous and this became one of the best-known poems of the post-war South, memorized and recited by generations of Southern schoolchildren.

Ryan told an interviewer that he wrote the Conquered Banner in Knoxville, Tennessee shortly after General Robert E. Lee's surrender at Appomattox, "When my mind was engrossed with the thought of our dead soldiers and our dead Cause".

David O'Connell has described Conquered Banner as echoing Ralph Waldo Emerson's extremely popular "Concord Hymn" (1837). According to O'Connell, readers would have unconsciously have thought of Emerson's poem about "Concord" when Ryan used the word "conquered" and, by using Emerson's reference to a furled flag, Ryan would have enhanced the patriotic resonance his poem had among Southern readers brought up reciting Emerson's "Concord Hymn".

The final verse reads:

Furl that banner, softly, slowly!

Treat it gently—it is holy--
For it droops above the dead.
Touch it not—unfold it never,
Let it droop there, furled forever,
For its people's hopes are dead!

—The Conquered Banner.

This is interpreted as Ryan's statement that, however noble he and others thought the Confederate cause had been, the defeat was final, and the Confederate idea should be put away forever, along with the Confederate flag.

The poem was published again in the first issue of the Confederate Veteran in 1893. John McGreevy calls it the most popular Confederate poem in the post-Civil War years.

Attorney and Southerner Hannis Taylor wrote of the effect of Father Ryan's poem on readers sympathetic to the Confederacy: "Only those who lived in the South in that day, and passed under the spell of that mighty song, can properly estimate its power as it fell upon the victims of a fallen cause." The poem reached the height of its popularity between 1890 and 1920.

In 1941 Carl Van Doren included the poem in The Patriotic Anthology, writing that to omit Southern "expressions of patriotism" would be to "falsify the record and also impoverish it".
