= James McMaster =

American journalist

James McMaster (born MacMaster; April 1, 1820 – December 29, 1886) was a 19th-century American Roman Catholic newspaper editor and activist known for his conservative political views and ultramontane religious values. McMaster was a "states rights" Democrat, "...ever intemperate and always arch-conservative."

== Early life ==
McMaster was born in Duanesburg, New York, the son of Gilbert MacMaster, a Presbyterian minister. He was descended from Scots who had settled in Vermont. He entered Union College but left before graduation. He briefly read law at Columbia.

He entered the General Theological Seminary in New York to become an Episcopalian priest. While there, he converted to Catholicism, under the influence of the writings of John Henry Newman. He added the name "Alphonsus" in honor of Alphonsus Liguori, founder of the Redemptorists, and enrolled in an ultramontane Redemptionist seminary in Belgium, but did not take holy orders.

McMaster had either three children, according to Thomas Meehan, writing in the Catholic Encyclopedia, or four children, according to his New York Times obituary. His son Alphonsus became a physician. According to Meehan, two daughters became nuns, one a Carmelite and one who joined the Society of the Holy Child Jesus. According to the Times, there were three daughters, two of whom became Carmelite nuns and one who joined the Society of the Holy Child Jesus. Writer Patrick McNamara numbers three children.

== Career ==
McMaster returned to New York, worked as a freelance journalist, and in 1848 became the publisher and editor of the city's principal Catholic newspaper, The New York Freeman's Journal, which he purchased from then-bishop John Hughes. He changed his surname to McMaster, an Irish-looking name with more appeal to the paper's largely Irish-American readership than the Scottish-spelling MacMaster. The paper continued to function, in effect, as the voice of the archdiocese.

McMaster had "...an aversion to episcopal supervision and a determination to propound his own views." Ultimately, McMaster tried even the patience of Archbishop Hughes. In July 1856, Hughes decided to break with the paper, informing McMaster that he must make clear to his readers that his columns were not to be taken as representing the official archdiocesan view on anything. The heading "Official Organ of the Archdiocese" had to come off the masthead. Any number of articles from that period might have offended Hughes, but McMaster crossed a line in a May 31 editorial about the Bleeding Kansas controversy when he offered the view that if someone took a gun to abolitionists Horace Greeley, Theodore Parker, and William Lloyd Garrison, a "great relief" would be felt across the nation. That was not a sentiment that the archbishop shared or could afford to be associated with.

McMaster strongly opposed sending Catholic children to public schools. He supported slavery and the secession. He opposed the Wilmot Proviso, advocating the right of Americans to hold slaves in every state. He wrote, "There has never been a day in which Catholics in the community of the Church and uncensored by her, have not held slaves." In 1860, he urged Southerners "not to throw away their future, and all the bright aspirations of American liberty, for the sake of four million black slaves." He was also outspoken in his support of the papacy and the doctrine of papal infallibility and in his attacks on anti-Catholic nativists and the Know Nothing Party. According to the New York Times, "He had bold things to say and he said them without fear." The Times also asserted that he was regarded by Americans as "chief" in a "bold scheme to make Rome the director of the United States".

Writers who worked with McMaster remembered him as a demanding and highly opinionated boss. One of his editors remarked that no one stood a chance at McMaster's newspaper, despite the man's absolute fidelity to the Church, "if he was too fully saturated with the gifts of the Holy Ghost." Meekness and generosity held no appeal for McMaster. The H.L. Mencken of his day, the publisher of the Freeman's Journal made clear when hiring anyone that he wanted writers with a fluent pen, a disregard for consequences, and a large capacity for malice. He expected his underlings to share his many prejudices (e.g., a belief in states' rights, a hatred of abolitionists, a lifelong suspicion of the Jesuits) and said that he wrote "to edify such good people as are not overstocked with brains or at least not trained to follow theological discussions." According to the Times, McMaster's advocacy of the idea that Catholics should be exempt from paying taxes to support public schools because "their articles of faith were not taught in them" and Catholic students were forced to read from the Protestant King James Bible made him the most "assailed" man in America, excepting only his equally controversial patron, Archbishop Hughes. Under McMaster the paper supported Mayor Fernando Wood, Grand Sachem of Tammany Hall.

There were consequences to McMaster's invective through the years. One man skewered in his pages in 1854, Irish political activist Thomas Francis Meagher, assaulted him with a whip on the street when the editor refused to retract his published attack on Meagher's character and intelligence. McMaster fired his revolver at Meagher but missed. Both men were arrested in a public scandal, later freed on bail, and agreed not to press charges against the other.

McMaster was jailed at Fort Lafayette and his newspaper shut down during President Lincoln's suspension of the writ of habeas corpus at the start of the American Civil War. When released from prison, he continued to write against the war effort, always believing that the South had a right to secede from the Union.

== Death ==
He died in Brooklyn in 1886, age 66. He had suffered a fall and spent two weeks at St. Mary's General Hospital before his death.

== See also ==
- History of education in New York City
