= Ecquid Novi =

Ecquid Novi: African Journalism Studies is a masked peer-reviewed academic journal for journalism research in Africa.

The journal was established in 1980 in South Africa and publishes critical articles from all perspectives that contribute to the theoretical knowledge base of journalism as a field of study, research and praxis in Africa. The journal specifically aims to foster a better understanding of journalism, media studies and mass communication as research disciplines in the comparative context of Africa and the South. While the focus of the journal is on Africa, its scope and academic interest is global.

Ecquid Novi is affiliated with the Journalism Studies Division of the International Communication Association, as well as the African Council for Communication Education and the Journalism Research and Education Section of the International Association for Media and Communication Research. The journal sponsors the best journalism research paper of the International Communication Division of the Association for Education in Journalism and Mass Communication. It is also affiliated with the South African Communication Association and is accredited by the South African Department of Education for the measurement of research output purposes.

The journal is published three times annually by Routledge and UNISA Press, in cooperation with the Institute for Media Analysis in South Africa. The editor is Herman Wasserman (School of Journalism and Media Studies, Rhodes University).

== Abstracting and indexing ==
The journal is abstracted and indexed in ProQuest, the Social Sciences Citation Index, and Scopus.
