= John Devoy =

Irish rebel

John Devoy Seán Ó Dubhuí
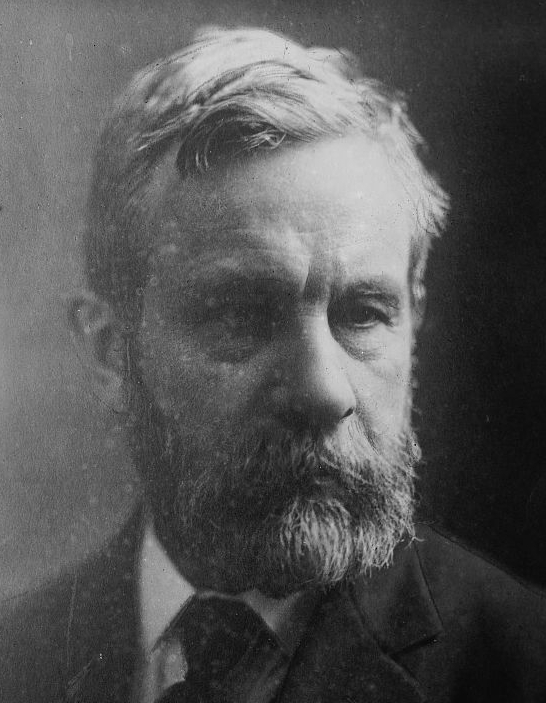
- Devoy in 1916
- Born: 2 September 1842; Kill, County Kildare, Ireland
- Died: 29 September 1928 (aged 86); Atlantic City. New Jersey, United States
- Resting place: Glasnevin Cemetery, Dublin, Ireland
- Organization(s): Irish Republican Brotherhood; Clan na Gael
- Movement: Irish Republicanism

John Devoy (Irish: Seán Ó Dubhuí, IPA: [ˈʃaːn̪ˠ oː ˈd̪ˠʊwiː]; 3 September 1842 – 29 September 1928) was an Irish republican rebel and journalist who owned and edited The Gaelic American, a New York weekly newspaper, from 1903 to 1928.

Devoy dedicated over 60 years of his life to the cause of Irish independence and was one of the few people to have played a role in the Fenian Rising of 1867, the Easter Rising of 1916 and the Irish War of Independence of 1919–1921.

== Early life ==
Devoy was born in Kill, County Kildare, on 3 September 1842 the son of a farmer and labourer named William Devoy. After the Irish famine of 1845-52, the family moved to Dublin where Devoy's mother obtained a job at Watkins' brewery. Devoy attended night school at the Catholic University before joining the Fenians. In 1861 he travelled to France with an introduction from Timothy Daniel Sullivan to John Mitchel. Devoy joined the French Foreign Legion and served in Algeria for a year before returning to Ireland to become a Fenian organiser in Naas, County Kildare.

== Nationalist leader ==
In 1865, when many Fenians were arrested, James Stephens, founder of the Irish Republican Brotherhood (IRB), appointed Devoy Chief Organiser of Fenians in the British Army in Ireland. His duty was to enlist Irish soldiers in the British Army into the IRB.

In November 1865, Devoy orchestrated Stephens' escape from Richmond Prison in Dublin.

In February 1866, an IRB Council of War called for an immediate uprising, but Stephens refused, to Devoy's annoyance, as Devoy calculated the Fenian force in the British Army to number 80,000. The British got wind of the plan through informers and moved the regiments abroad, replacing them with regiments from Britain. Devoy was arrested in February 1866 and interned in Mountjoy Gaol, then tried for treason and sentenced to fifteen years penal servitude. In Portland Prison Devoy organised prison strikes and was moved to Millbank Prison in Pimlico, London.

== American years ==
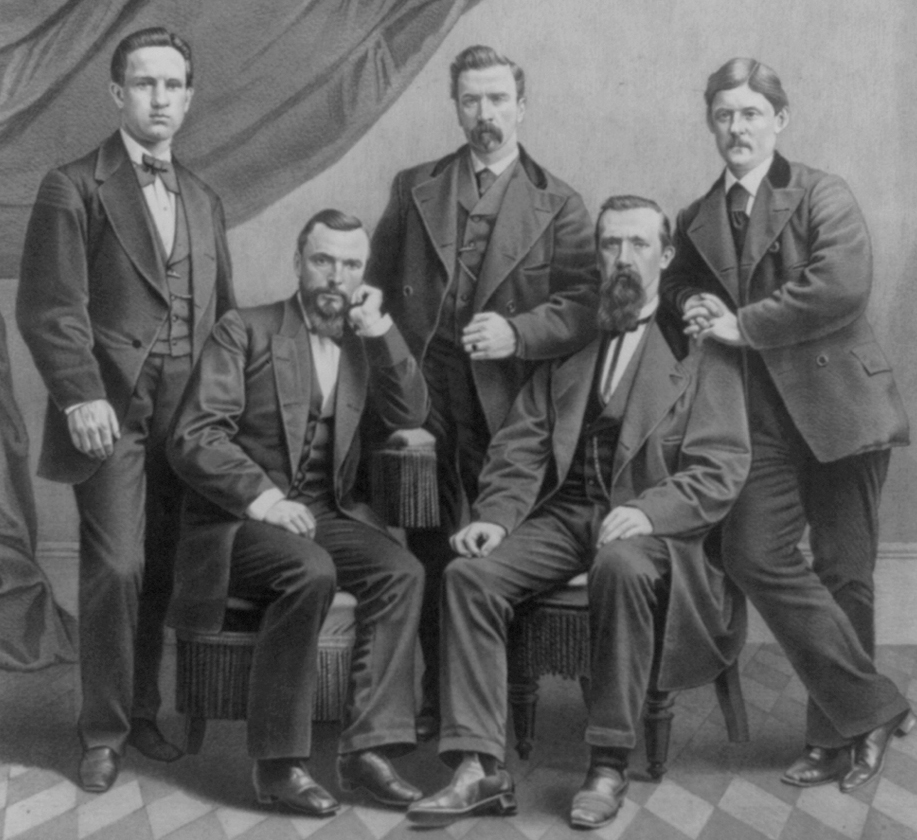
The Cuba Five: John Devoy, Charles O'Connell, Henry Mullady, O'Donovan Rossa and John McClure

In January 1871, he was released and exiled to the United States as one of the Cuba Five. He received an address of welcome from the House of Representatives. Devoy became a journalist for the New York Herald and was active in Clan na Gael. Under Devoy's leadership, Clan na Gael became the central Irish republican organisation in the United States. In 1877, he aligned the organisation with the Irish Republican Brotherhood in Ireland.

In 1875, Devoy and John Boyle O'Reilly organised the escape of six Fenians from Fremantle Prison in Western Australia aboard the Catalpa. In 1879, Devoy returned to Ireland to inspect Fenian centres and met Charles Kickham, John O'Leary and Michael Davitt en route in Paris; he convinced Davitt and Charles Stewart Parnell to co-operate in the "New Departure" during the growing Land War.

== Secret War ==
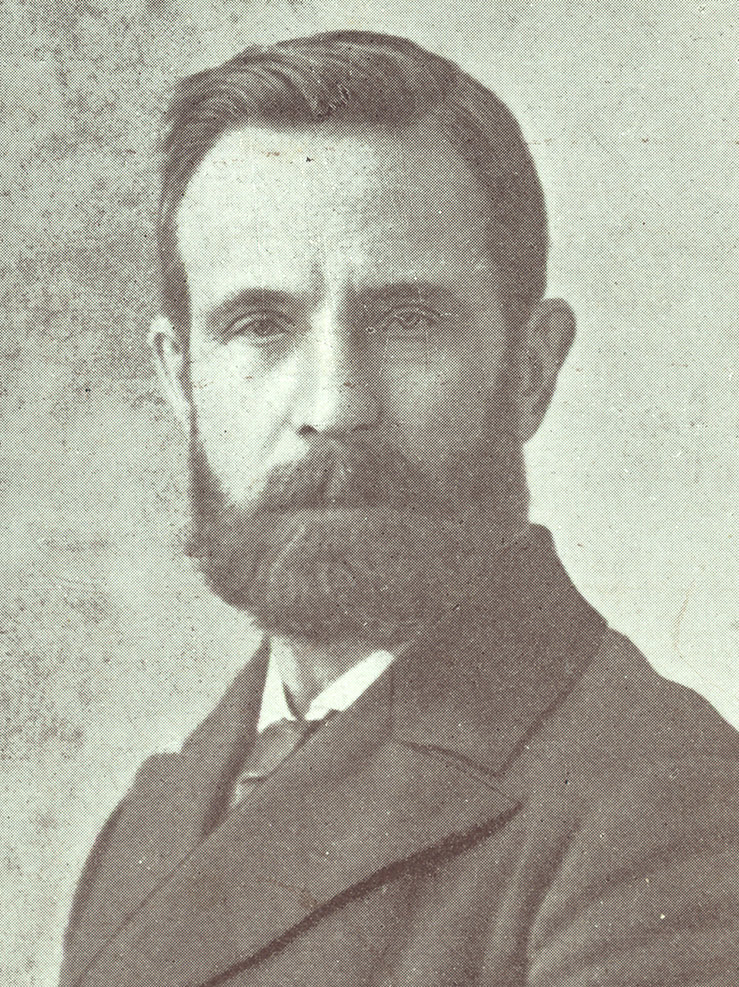
Devoy c. 1880s

Devoy's fundraising efforts and work to sway Irish-Americans to support violent nationalism during World War I included attempts to assist the Easter Rising in 1916. In 1914, Patrick Pearse visited the elderly Devoy in America, and later the same year, Roger Casement worked with Devoy in raising money for guns to arm the Irish Volunteers. Pearse was very impressed by Devoy's long and selfless dedication to the cause of Irish independence. In the written program for the burial of the Fenian leader O'Donovan Rossa Pearse referred to Devoy "as the greatest Fenian of them all".

At the declaration of war between Britain and Germany on 14 August 1914, Casement and Devoy arranged a meeting in New York between the Western Hemisphere's top-ranking German diplomat, Count Johann Heinrich von Bernstorff, and a delegation of Clan-na-Gael men. The Clan delegates proposed a mutually beneficial plan: if Germany would sell guns to the Irish rebels and provide military leaders, the rebels would revolt against Britain, diverting troops and attention from the war with Germany. Bernstorff listened with evident sympathy and promised to relay the proposal to Berlin. Devoy decided to communicate directly with Berlin. At the time, Britain held control of the seas; within days of the start of the war it had cut the transatlantic cable. It would be necessary to send an envoy to deliver the message personally.

John Kenny, president of the New York Clan na Gael, was sent. After meeting the German ambassador in Rome and presenting Devoy's plan, Kenny met in Germany with Count von Bülow. He then travelled to Dublin where he told Tom Clarke and other members of the Irish Republican Brotherhood of the arrangement, and carried back to Devoy the IRB's wishlist for guns, money, and military leaders. The details of Kenny's mission were later published in The Gaelic American. Though he was sceptical of the endeavour, Devoy financed and supported Casement's expedition to Germany to enlist German aid in the struggle to free Ireland from British rule, including Casement's Irish Brigade. Nervous of Casement's companion Adler Christensen, whom he discovered was a fraudster, and of Casement's decision to put the Irish Brigade at the Germans' disposal in Turkey, Devoy advised Casement to return to the US, advice which was ignored.

In 1915, Joseph Plunkett visited Devoy in the United States and Casement and diplomats in Germany. Plunkett informed Devoy that the German General Staff was cooperating and that a rising would take place soon. The inference was that Ireland would remain independent if Germany helped the coming Easter Rising by supplying guns and expertise and an attack on Britain simultaneous with the Rising. These guns were supplied, in the SS Libau; Devoy was blamed by the leaders of the Rising for failing to follow instructions that the guns should arrive on Easter Sunday, set for the start of the Rising. The IRB men sent to meet the Libau drove off a pier in the dark and were drowned, and the ship was scuttled by its captain and the guns sent to the bottom of the sea. Casement was captured as a result of the same mistiming.

In 1916, Devoy played an important role in the formation of the Clan-dominated Friends of Irish Freedom at the third Irish Race Convention, a propaganda organisation whose membership totalled at one point 275,000. The Friends supported Woodrow Wilson for the presidency in 1916 because of his policy of American neutrality in the world war. Fearful of accusations of disloyalty for their co-operation with Germans and opposition to the United States' entering the war on the side of Great Britain, the Friends lowered their profile after April 1917, when America entered the war. With the end of the war, Devoy played a key role in the Friends' advocacy for self-determination for Ireland, in line with Wilson's "Fourteen Points", as distinct from recognition by the United States of the sovereignty of the newly declared Irish Republic. Wilson did not guarantee recognition of the Republic, as declared in 1916 and reaffirmed in the popular election in 1918. American-Irish republicans challenged the Friends' refusal to campaign for American recognition of the Irish Republic.

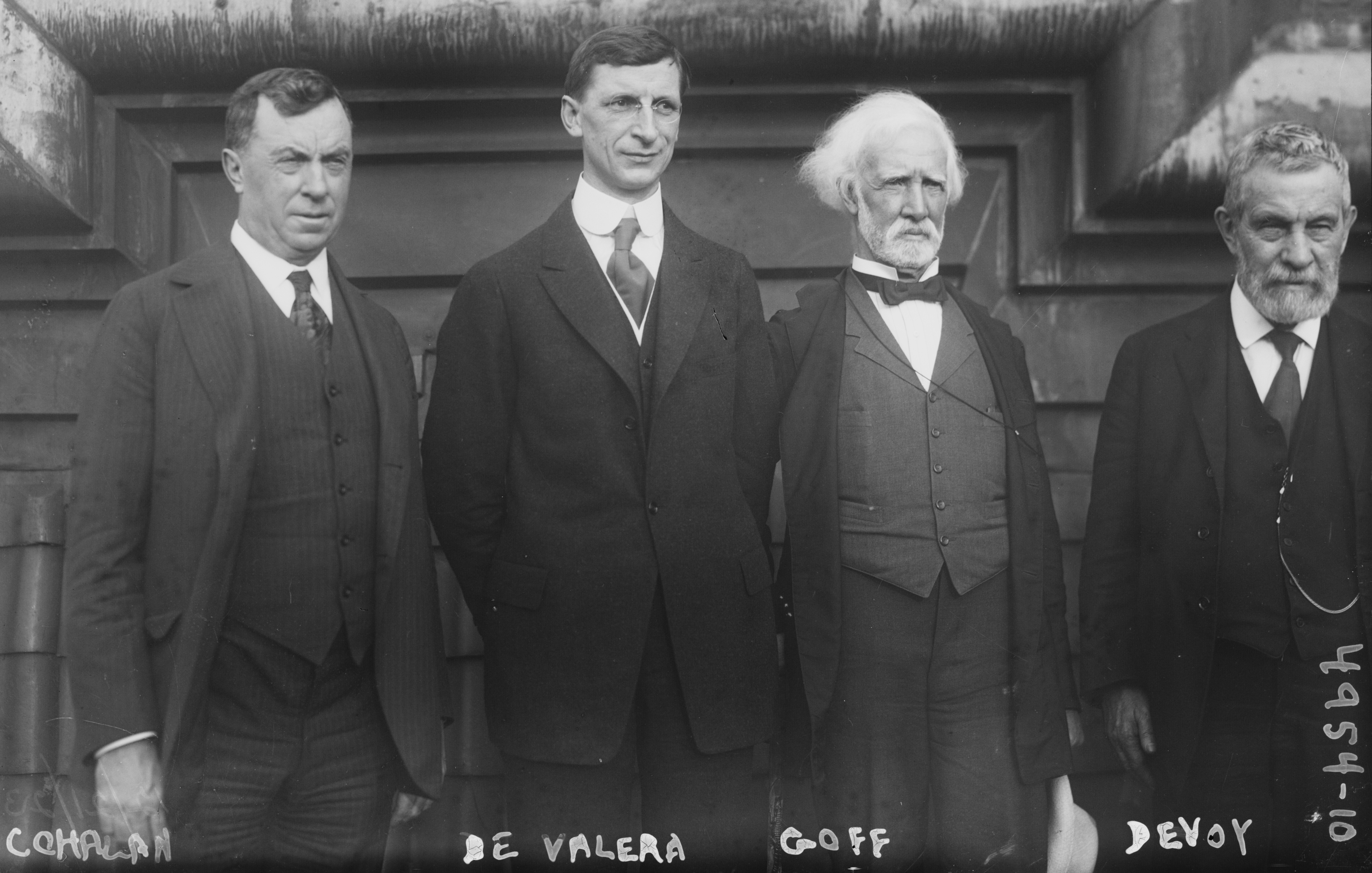
Devoy hosting Eamon De Valera in New York City in 1919

Devoy and the Friends' Daniel F. Cohalan became the key players in a transatlantic dispute with de facto Irish president Éamon de Valera, who toured the United States in 1919 and 1920 in hopes of gaining US recognition of the Republic and American funds. Devoy was scathingly critical of De Valera's visit, saying of him, "This half-breed Jew has done me more harm in the last two years than the English have been able to do during my whole life." Believing that the Americans should follow Irish policy, de Valera formed the "American Association for the Recognition of the Irish Republic" in 1920 with help from the Philadelphia Clan na Gael. Devoy, who was suspicious of de Valera, had enormous admiration for Michael Collins, whom Devoy referred to as "Ireland's Fighting Chief". Diplomatic recognition was not yet forthcoming, and Irish-American groups refused to support Wilson. $5.5m was raised to aid the new Irish nation.

== Personal life ==
Devoy never married and had no children. Around 1866, he became engaged to Eliza Kenny, the daughter of a local farmer. However, Devoy's arrest, conviction and subsequent transportation meant the marriage did not go ahead. Kenny waited for Devoy's return, but she eventually married Thomas Kilmurry in 1884.

When Devoy returned to Ireland in 1924, Kenny, who was then an elderly widow, contacted Devoy's relatives in Dublin. Devoy had been under the assumption that Kenny had died, but that was actually Kenny's sister. After not having seen each other for 58 years, Devoy visited Kenny, who was living with her niece in Naas. Devoy and Kenny continued correspondence after his return to the United States, up until her death in 1927, aged 81.

== Later life and death ==
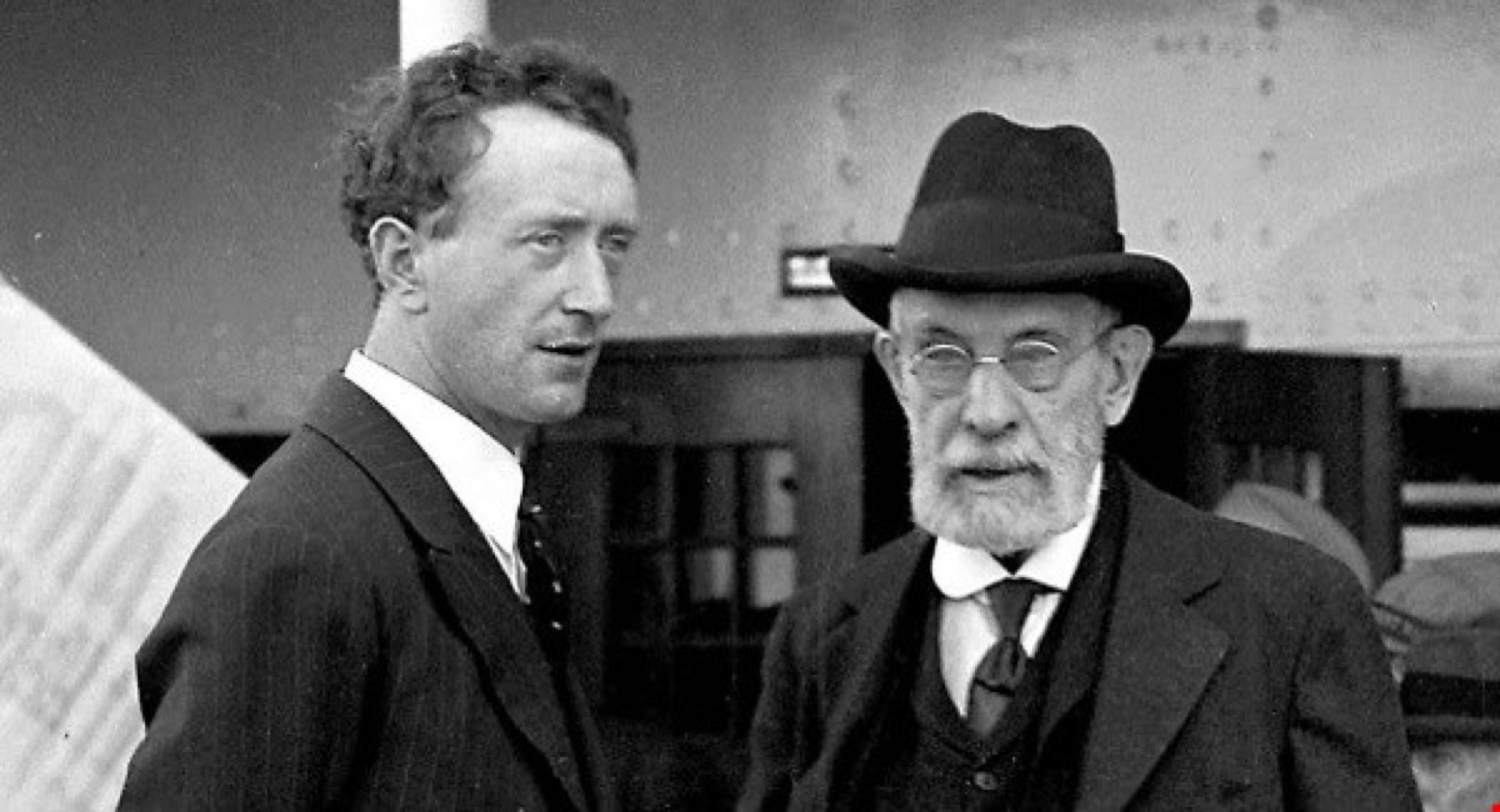
Desmond FitzGerald hosting Devoy during his 1924 tour of Ireland

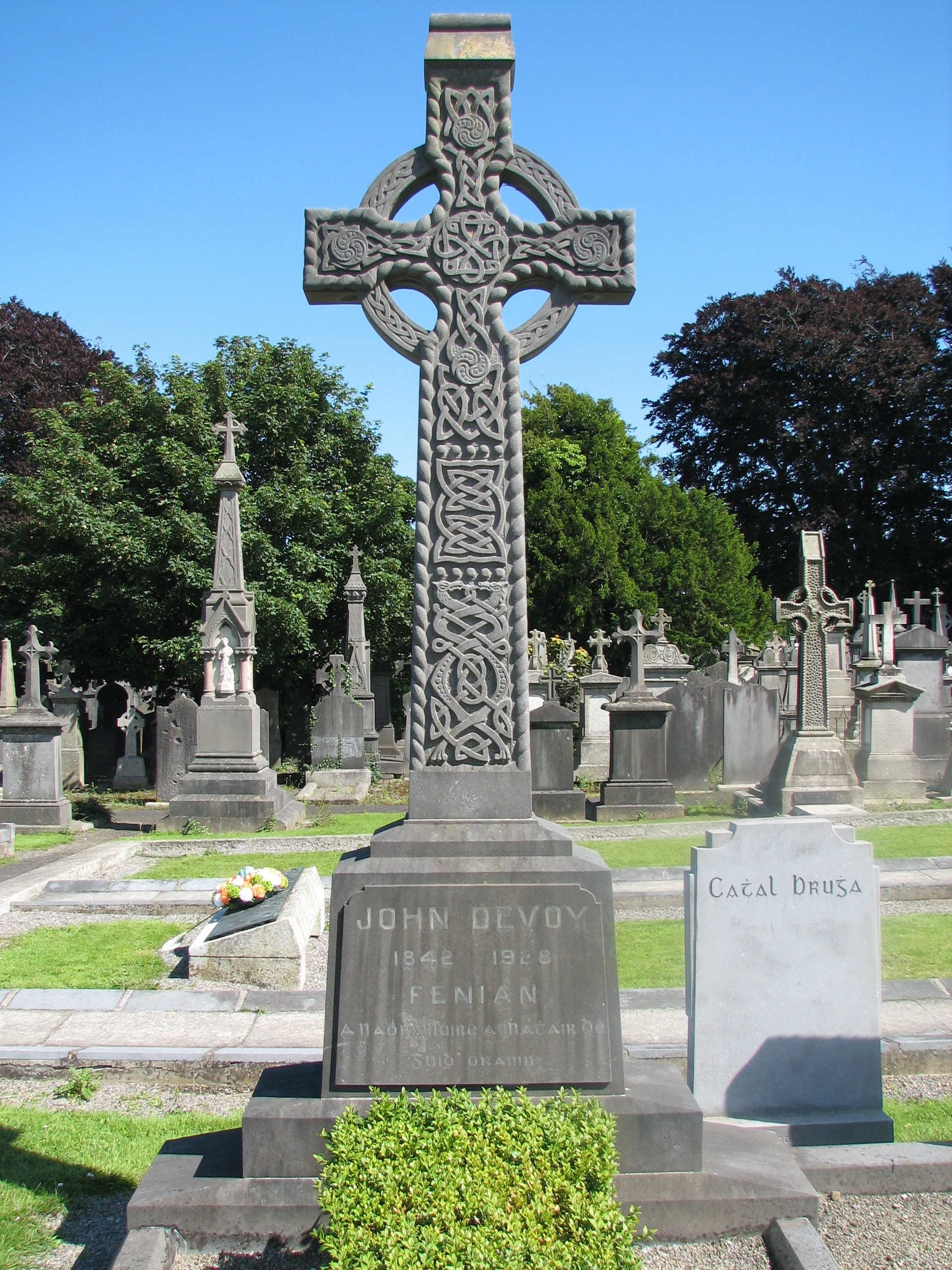
Devoy's grave at Glasnevin Cemetery, Dublin

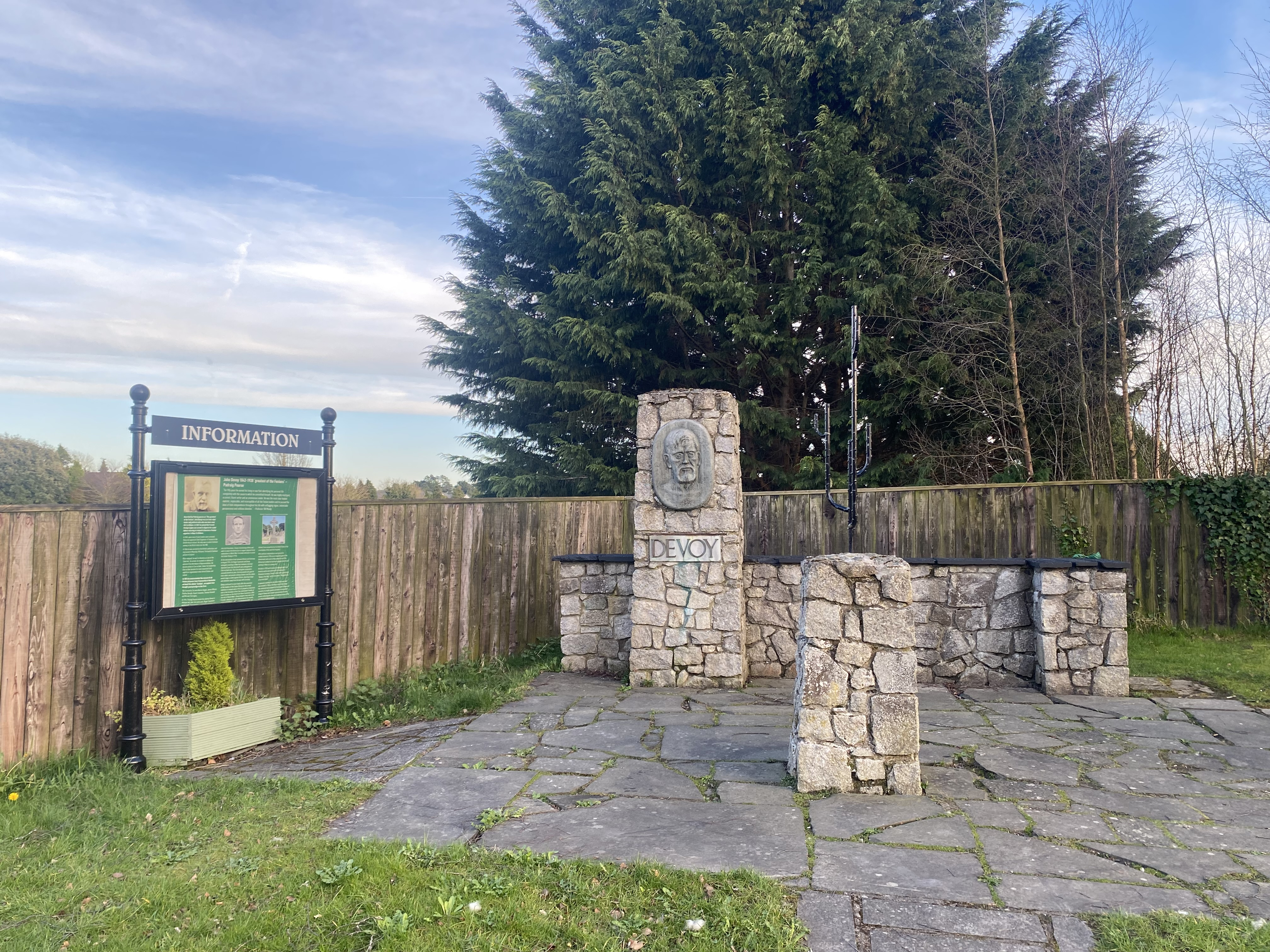
John Devoy Memorial at Kill

Devoy was editor of The Gaelic American from 1903 until his death.

He supported the 1921 Anglo-Irish Treaty and the formation of the Irish Free State during the Irish Civil War. In 1924, Devoy triumphantly returned to Ireland as an honoured guest of the Cumann na nGaedheal Government of W. T. Cosgrave.

Devoy died from natural causes on 29 September 1928, aged 86, while visiting Atlantic City, New Jersey. His death caused widespread mourning. His body was returned to Ireland where a state funeral was held. He was buried in Glasnevin Cemetery in June 1929.

Devoy Barracks in Naas, County Kildare was named for him and housed the Irish Army Apprentice School from 1956 until its closure in 1998.

A large memorial to him stands on the road between his native Kill and Johnstown. On 25 October 2016, a statue of Devoy was unveiled in Poplar Square, Naas, County Kildare.

== Bibliography ==
- Irish Rebel: John Devoy and America's Fight for Ireland's Freedom by Terry Golway (1999)
- The Greatest of the Fenians: John Devoy in Ireland by Terrence Dooley
- John Devoy's Catalpa Expedition by John Devoy (ISBN 0-8147-2748-4)
- 'Recollections of an Irish Rebel by John Devoy (1929)

== Resources ==
- Devoy, John. John Devoy's Catalpa Expedition (ISBN 0-8147-2748-4)
- Devoy, John. The Land of Eire: The Irish Land League, Its Origin, Progress and Consequences (New York: Patterson and Neilson, 1882).
- Devoy, John. 1929. Recollections of an Irish rebel. New York: Chase D. Young Company.
- Irish Rebel: John Devoy and America's Fight for Ireland's Freedom, by Terry Golway, St. Martin's Griffin, 1999 (ISBN 0-312-19903-1).
- Kenny, Kevin. The Irish in America: A History, (New York: Person Education Ltd., 2000), p. 173
- Miller, Kerby. Emigrants and Exiles: Ireland and the Irish Exodus to North America (New York: Oxford University Press, 1985), pp. 542–543
- Ryan, Desmond (1937). The Phoenix Flame: A Study of Fenianism and John Devoy. Arthur Baker.
