= The Gaelic American =

Irish nationalist newspaper in the United States

The Gaelic American was an Irish nationalist newspaper published in the United States from 1903 to 1951 that was, along with the Irish Nation, owned by John Devoy. It was re-launched as an online news publication in 2021.

== History ==
A weekly publication of the organization that eventually came to be known as Sinn Féin, it was amongst the foremost Irish ethnic newspapers until the Great Depression when its readership declined. It had at various times as its editor George Freeman and John Devoy. Between its establishment in 1903 and the early 1920s, the paper vehemently supported Irish republicanism and the use of physical force to achieve independence. In contrast to other Irish-American papers such as the Irish World, the Gaelic American supported the pro-Republic Clan na Gael organization and denounced the American wing of John Redmond's more moderate Irish Parliamentary Party, which advocated for Home Rule within the British Empire. In its early years, the paper also collaborated extensively with the Indian nationalist organisations in Britain and the United States, most notably the India House in London and its sister organisations in New York City.

It reprinted articles from The Indian Sociologist, and editor George Freeman was a close associate of Shyamji Krishna Varma. The paper in the 1910s also developed close cooperation with Taraknath Das and its facilities were used for printing Das's nationalist politician journal, Free Hindustan.

In 1951, the paper was acquired by The Irish World and American Industrial Liberator.

On July 4, 2021, The Gaelic American was re-launched as “An Online News Publication Dedicated to the Cause of Irish Unity, the Irish Language, and the Interests of Irish-America.” The website link is www.gaelicamerican.com
