= Journalistic interventionism =

Journalists promoting their own values

Journalistic interventionism "reflects the extent to which journalists pursue a particular mission and promote certain values". Journalists with a high interventionist attitude do not report neutrally and objectively but are engaged in the subjects they are reporting about. An interventionist reporting style aims at influencing public opinion. Moreover, "journalism cultures that follow an interventionist approach may act on behalf of the socially disadvantaged or as mouthpiece of a political party and other groups whose interest are at stake".

== Range of journalistic interventionism ==
Journalistic interventionism takes place in politics such as in election campaigns, and in peace journalism. Thomas Hanitzsch, associate professor of Communication Studies and Media Research at LMU Munich, proposes a continuum on which the degree of interventionism is measured. "The intervention pole of the continuum becomes manifest in role models like the 'participant', 'advocate', and 'missionary'" with journalists taking a more active role in their reporting. There are two factors that interrelate interventionism and journalistic culture: Distance to power holders and market orientation. Journalists with distance to power holders are expected to be more skeptical whereas journalists with close proximity to power holders tend to be more defensive of them and do not intervene as much as the skeptical journalist. Journalists in a market-oriented news culture, on the other hand, perceive citizens as consumers. In contrast, journalists in a public-interest culture are less market-oriented and regard their audience as citizens rather than consumers. They "produce news in regard to the democratic needs of society" and are less interventionist.

The "critical change agent", one of the four professional journalistic milieus that Hanitzsch suggests, tends to "emphasize the importance of advocating social change, influencing public opinion and setting the political agenda" and serves as an example of an interventionist reporting style. The degree of interventionism in journalistic reporting varies across different countries. In a study conducted by Hanitzsch et al. that interviewed 2100 professional journalists from 18 countries, it turned out that journalists from non-Western contexts tend to be more interventionist in their role perceptions and more flexible in their ethical views. According to this study, 73% of the Egyptian journalists and 68% of the Turkish journalists regard themselves as "critical change agent" and thus as rather interventionist. In Germany, only 10% and in the USA 21% of the journalists regard themselves as "critical change agent".

Generally, "high interventionism is found in a journalistic culture that is labeled 'pragmatic'". In a pragmatic news culture, only political material with a high news value will be included into news programs whereas other political material will be excluded. Moreover, candidates' statements are used as raw material out of which the journalist then constructs his or her own story.

=== Interventionism in election campaigns ===
In the broadcasting of election campaigns, journalists intervene in the process of political change when they, for instance, navigate the politician's amount of speech. Generally, journalistic interventionism is most likely to occur in a political communication culture that is media-oriented. Here, politicians or political spokespersons "have to accept the maxims of media production as their own rules if they are to be in any position at all to communicate their messages". As a consequence, there emerges a tendency towards a "personalization of politics, a preference for political human-touch aspects, and a predilection for visual and (television) dramaturgical infotainment formats". Frank Esser, professor of International and Comparative Media at the University of Zurich, conducted a research about the length of sound and image bites (short quotations and visual images of politicians on television news) in order to analyze journalistic intervention.

Esser shows in his work which factors influence journalistic intervention in the broadcasting of election campaigns (in different national contexts). In professional journalism, the media structure as well as the political structure have influence on the extent of journalistic interventionism. According to this model, interventionism occurs in a political culture in which public opinion is distrustful of political institutions. Generally, interventionism most likely occurs when the media has achieved a high status of independence, especially from political control. As a result, the sound bites of politicians in an interventionist report tend to be rather short whereas those from the journalists tend to be longer. High interventionism in an election campaign also leads to "a smaller amount of election news coverage in general". In an interventionist reporting style, journalism becomes more focused on journalists instead on the politicians or the subject they report about, and thus journalists "increase their influence, authority, and prestige". Thus, media interventionism is high when journalists convey the content of election campaigns in their own words. Jesper Strömbäck, professor of Media and Communication at the Mid Sweden University and Daniela V. Dimitrova, assistant professor at the Greenlee School of Journalism and Communication at the Iowa State University, developed indicators with which the degree of journalistic interventionism can be measured in, for instance, election campaigns. They found the following indicators relevant:

1. The length of the politician's speech parts (determined by the journalist).
2. The degree of the journalist's visibility: "The more journalists are visible – for example through stand-ups or anchors interviewing reporters live or in studio – the more they insert themselves between viewers and that which the news content is ostensibly about".
3. The extent to which politicians are granted the wrap-up, this means the concluding speech part.
4. Lip flaps; that means that the journalists voice drowns the politician's voice and thus "is in effect silencing the politicians".
5. The framing of a canvass as a strategic game or a horse race through journalist's reporting style.
6. The degree to which news content is mediatized; that means the dependence of a political system on mass media; is related to the journalistic style of news reports. Interpretative and descriptive reporting styles are opposed. The interpretative style attempts to go beyond the obvious and provides analysis or context. This style gives journalists more control over the message and is thus more interventionist since the journalist has the power to shape the story.

With the help of these indicators, the degree of journalistic interventionism in political news report can be measured.

=== Interventionism in peace journalism ===
Peace journalism is inherently interventionist since it actively promotes peace through public communication. Furthermore, "Peace Journalism combines journalism with peace as an external aim". Journalists who advocate for peace are no longer neutral observers but report selectively. "Peace journalism is when editors and reporters make choices – of what stories to report, and how to report them". Hanitzsch claims that peace journalists understand their audience as passive which needs to be enlightened by their journalistic work. It is a journalistic form which functions beyond the values of objectivity, neutrality, and detachment. "Peace journalism inherits a normative impetus; it prioritizes peace as its central value and analytical starting point". It is interventionist since its primary goal is not to report neutrally but it creates reality, sets examples and calls for change. It regards itself as a vehicle for the advocacy of peace and non-violent conflict resolutions.

== Reasons for an interventionist reporting style ==
One reason for the development of an interventional journalism in news report about politics is for instance the commercialization of journalism. Commercialization shifts the power from the politicians to the news media, and media becomes more central in the political communication and thus gains power to shape political news content. In a commercialized broadcasting system and a "pluralistic, internally autonomous press with high degree of political autonomy", political communication is dominated by the media. Additionally, in a culture in which public opinion is rather distrustful of political institutions, adversarial – and thus interventionist journalism – is socially accepted. Furthermore, in an independent, highly professionalized journalistic culture, "the development of autonomous and distinctively journalistic criteria" leads to "proactive, party-distant" and thus also interventionist journalistic style.

== Criticism ==
Interventional journalism is a non-neutral form of reporting and deviates from the general journalistic values to report objectively. However, it is difficult to determine at which point a journalistic contribution is interventionist. "It is exceedingly difficult to determine, for example, whether negative or positive coverage of a politician or issue is a result of partisan bias, the nature of events, or other factors". Also in terms of political news content, it is difficult to "find a yardstick for 'appropriate' proximity or distance to political spokespersons and journalists". Thus, it is difficult to determine whether – and to which degree – a journalist acts as an interventionist. Generally, it is hard to classify interventionism as a journalistic style as merely positive or negative. The discussion about journalistic interventionism mirrors the general debate about what professional journalism is, and how it can be defined, also in different countries.

== See also ==
- Journalism culture
- Advocacy journalism
- Peace journalism
- Political communication
