= New York Freeman =

American Catholic weekly newspaper

The New York Freeman (1849–1918) was an American Catholic weekly newspaper in New York City.

== History ==
The Weekly Register and Catholic Diary was started on October 5, 1833, by Fathers Schneller and Levins. It lasted three years, and was succeeded, in 1839, by the Catholic Register, which, the next year, was combined with the Freeman's Journal, then a year old to form The New York Freeman's Journal and Catholic Register. It was first edited by James W. White and afterwards by Eugene Casserly and John T. Devereux.

In 1842, Bishop John Hughes took the paper to keep it alive. In 1846, Hughes took over the direct management—appointing his secretary James Roosevelt Bayley to take charge of it—in order to establish it on a solid financial basis. Bayley did some little writing and attended to the business affairs of the paper, but the main work was done by James McMaster, who made an excellent editor. The bishop's object having been accomplished through Bayley's efforts in 1848, he cast about for a responsible person who might purchase the paper and relieve the diocese of the responsibility. On March 27, 1848, Bayley wrote for him to Orestes Brownson asking whether he would be willing to take the weekly "out and out," promising it would afford him "at present a clear income of 12 or 15 hundred Dollars," but Brownson declined in a reply of April 3, in which he went into considerable detail, adducing various reasons why he should not accept, the chief one being that he dared not trust himself away from the direction of the Bishop of Boston. Bayley recorded on April 20, 1848, that McMaster was leaving the paper that week, and he himself was resigning as editor, as John C. Devereux was to take it over, but this arrangement proved to be only a temporary one, as the July 1, 1848 issue of the paper announced the sole editorship of McMaster. McMaster borrowed the money for its purchase from George Hecker, a brother of the Rev. Isaac T. Hecker, founder of the Paulists.

From 1842 to 1849, it was known as the Freeman's Journal and Catholic Register, then as the New York Freeman's Journal. It was published every Saturday. Under McMaster the paper supported Mayor Fernando Wood, Grand Sachem of Tammany Hall.

McMaster had "...an aversion to episcopal supervision and a determination to propound his own views." Ultimately, McMaster tried even the patience of Archbishop Hughes. In July 1856, Hughes decided to break with the paper, informing McMaster that he must make clear to his readers that his columns were not to be taken as representing the official archdiocesan view on anything. The heading "Official Organ of the Archdiocese" had to come off the masthead.

In 1861, because of its violent State's Rights editorials, it was suppressed by Secretary of State William Seward, but resumed publication in April 1862 as the New York Freeman's Appeal, all under the same editor, James A. McMaster.

The most popular post-war pro-Confederate poem, "The Conquered Banner", made its first appearance in the pages of the Freeman.

McMaster continued as its editor and proprietor until his death, December 29, 1886. Maurice Francis Egan was editor of the paper for two years after McMaster's death, and in 1894 the Rev. Dr. Louis A. Lambert took the position and so continued until his death in 1910.

In April 1889, the paper published a series of articles by Rev. Pacifico N. Capitani, who organized the first Italian parish in Cleveland. In his articles he defended the Italian immigrants from disparaging attacks. In 1891, the series was translated into Italian and sold as a pamphlet.
