= John Kenny (Clan-na-Gael) =

Irish revolutionary

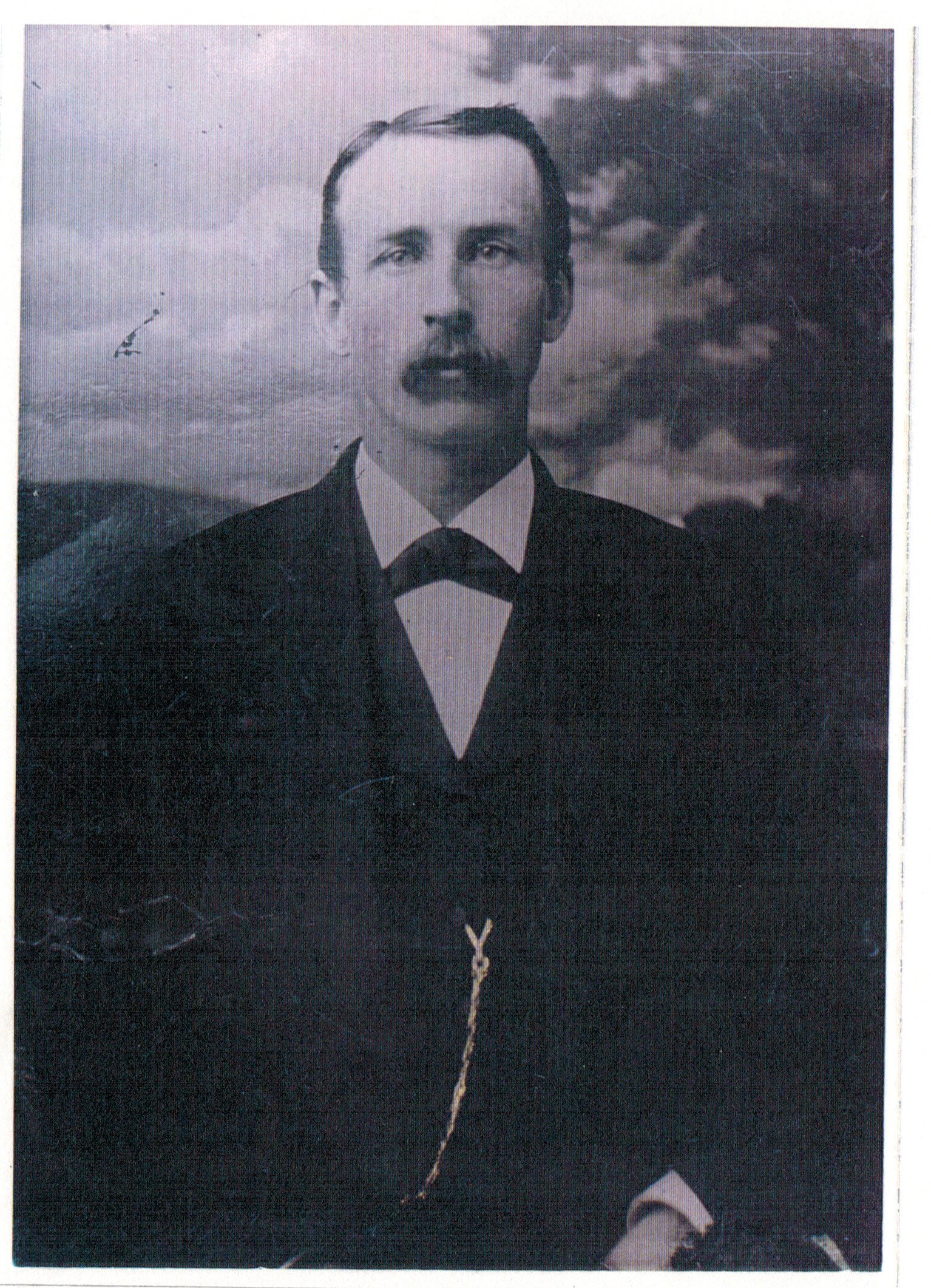
John Kenny

John Kenny (1847–1924) long-time member and multi-term president (1883, 1914) of the Clan-na-Gael, which supplied support to the rebels in Ireland, culminating in the Easter Rising. John Kenny was a life-long close associate of John Devoy, having been born near Devoy's hometown, been a member of the Irish Republican Brotherhood, and having worked very closely with Devoy in New York for decades. Under the cover of personal and business trips, he served as liaison between the "Home Office" (the Irish Republican Brotherhood in Ireland) and the Clan-na-Gael. In 1914 he served as the Clan's envoy to Berlin to present the Clan's proposal that Germany sell arms to the Irish, who would then stage a rebellion against their common enemy, England. On his return to New York he stopped in Dublin to inform Thomas Clarke. He returned to Ireland to deliver money for the guns and to bring back messages from the I.R.B.

== Early life – Clan-na-Gael 1871–1885 ==
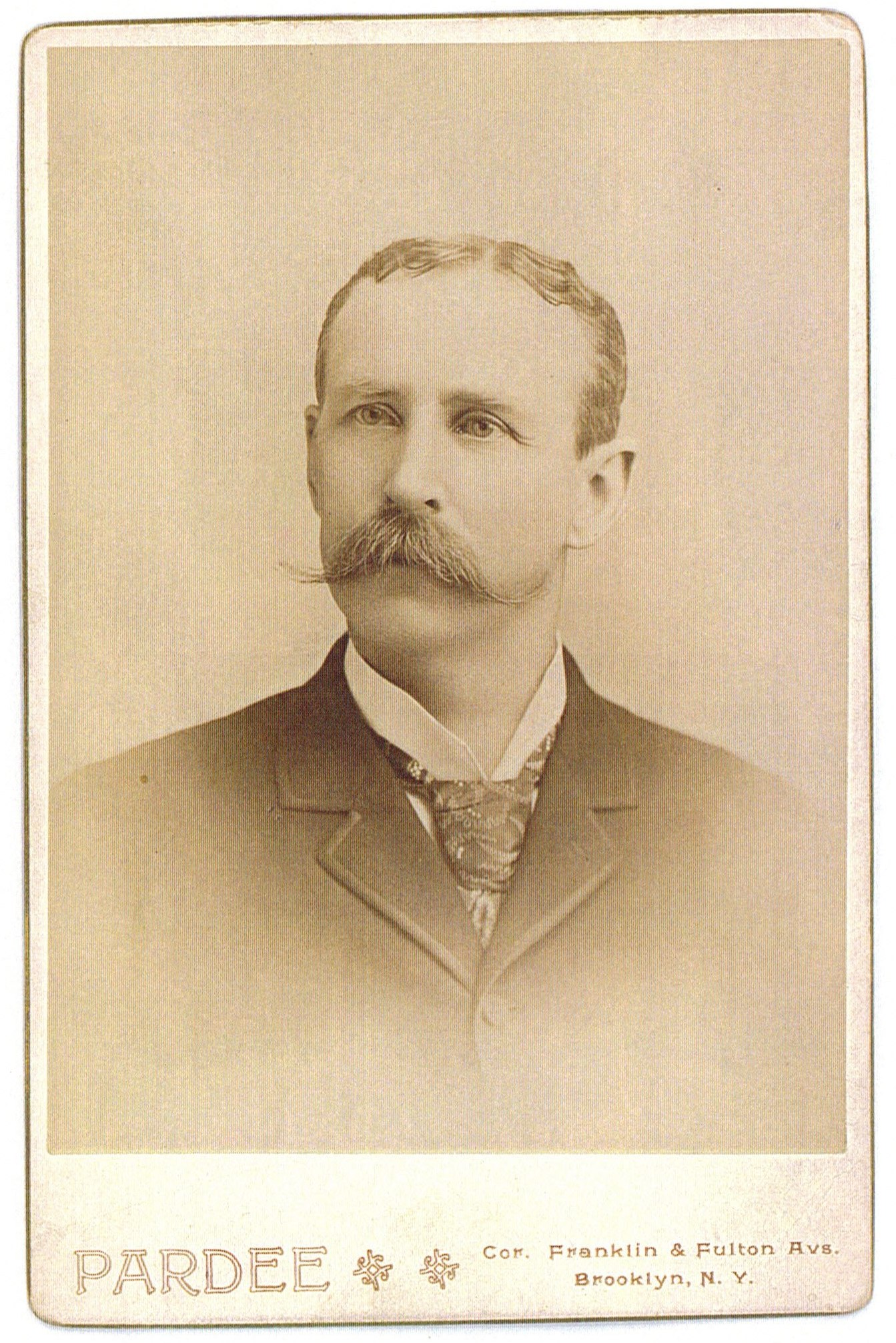
John Kenny – taken in Brooklyn

John Kenny was born in 1847 in Kilcock, County Kildare, to a family of wealthy farmers. After a successful stint in gold mining in Australia, he emigrated to New York in 1870, where he joined the Irish-American organisation Napper Tandy, the parent branch of the Clan-na-Gael. Kenny played a major role in the Catalpa rescue, the Clan-na-Gael's rescue of six Irish prisoners in 1873 from British prison in Fremantle, Western Australia. The rescue is credited with having breathed new life into the Irish organisations in America, which at the time were in disarray following several failed ventures. As president of the Clan-na-Gael in 1882, Kenny swore in 23-year-old newcomer Thomas B. Clarke, who was elected the organizational secretary. Thus began their lifelong friendship, lasting 34 years until Clarke's execution as a leader of the Easter Rising. In 1883 Kenny passed along Clarke's offer to volunteer for the Clan-na-Gaels' bombing campaign in London. Clarke's offer was accepted. The campaign, devised by Jeremiah O'Donovan Rossa, failed and Clarke ended up serving 15 1/2 years in British prisons.

== Land League, County Kildare 1885–1890 ==
While Kenny was president, his chapter of the Clan na Gael put in writing their opposition to the policies of Clan na Gael president Alexander Sullivan, who promoted bombing missions in England, and who broke ties with the Irish Republican Brotherhood over their objections to the missions. Sullivan ejected Kenny's chapter from the Clan na Gael, along with all other chapters that voiced similar objections. Fearing Sullivan's influence over the Land League in Ireland, and in defense of the New Departure, Kenny returned to Ireland in 1885 to play an active role in the Irish National Land League, giving up a lucrative business and relocating his family to Kilcock, County Kildare. Discouraged by the course of events in Ireland, Kenny moved his family back to New York in 1890. In 1898 Clarke also returned to New York, on his release from prison, and worked at the Gaelic American newspaper with editor John Devoy. Kenny travelled frequently between Ireland and New York, serving as a liaison between the Irish Republican Brotherhood in Ireland (or, as it was referred to in New York, the "Home Office") and the Clan-na-Gael in America. In 1907, Thomas Clarke returned to Dublin to rally support for a rebellion.

== Return to New York 1890 ==
In 1914 Kenny, living in New York, was again the president of the Clan-na-Gael. He was also the vice-president of the I.R.B. Veterans, a founding member of the Irish Volunteers Committee (the provisional committee formed to arm the Irish Volunteers Irish National Volunteers in Ireland), a founder of the Land League (and in 1916 of the Friends of Irish Freedom), and an active supporter of Padraic Pearse's St. Enda's School and the women's organisation the Cumann na mBan. He also served as the Business Manager of the Gaelic American newspaper, and later as a founder of the Friends of Irish Freedom

== Mission to Germany to request guns and military assistance ==
At the declaration of war between England and Germany on 14 August 1914, Sir Roger Casement and John Devoy arranged a meeting in New York between the Western Hemisphere's top-ranking German diplomat, Count von Bernstorff, and a delegation of Clan-na-Gael men. The Clan delegates proposed a mutually beneficial plan: if Germany would sell guns to the Irish rebels and provide military leaders, the rebels would stage a revolt against England, diverting troops and attention from the war with Germany. Von Bernstorff listened with evident sympathy and promised to relay the proposal to Berlin. Devoy decided to communicate directly with Berlin himself. At the time, England held control of the seas and furthermore, within days of the start of the war, had cut the transatlantic cable. It would be necessary to send an envoy to deliver the message personally.

John Kenny, a trusted long-time member and leader of many Irish organisations and a published author, was chosen. As an American citizen who had often travelled between New York and Ireland ostensibly for business reasons, he would attract less attention from British spies yet could be trusted to use his own discretion in presenting the proposal in the light.

Kenny left for Italy on 21 August 1914. At first he was denied entry by the Italian government but eventually was allowed to land, on the condition that he proceed immediately to the Swiss border. Instead, he headed to the Germany Embassy in Rome, where to his surprise he was granted an immediate and lengthy interview with von Flutow, the German ambassador to Italy. Kenny handed the ambassador the proposal written by Devoy (and Casement). Von Flutow was particularly concerned with the fact that the leader of the Irish Parliamentary Party, John Redmond, had promised the loyalty of the Irish Volunteers to England. He also showed great interest in Casement's scheme, the recruitment of Irish prisoners of war into the German army, questioning Kenny about the class of Irish soldiers, their reasons for joining the British army, and the strength of their loyalty. However, as the discussion continued, von Flutow suddenly said that he could see serious complications arising from this plan, in running afoul of international law. Yet he assured Kenny that this plan and all of the other points Kenny had presented would be forwarded immediately to the top leaders.

Before Kenny left the Embassy, von Flutow gave him an Imperial Pass allowing him to travel throughout Germany, to facilitate his meeting with the Kaiser.

At Casement's urging, Kenny attempted to get an interview with the pope, who was known to be sympathetic to the cause; however the pope declined, citing the need to maintain an appearance of strict neutrality. Kenny spent the next ten days zigzagging across a Europe disrupted by huge movements of troops, in an effort to meet up with the Kaiser. His progress was impeded by the vast movements of troops and by the expansion of the war. Using the Imperial Pass given to him by von Flutow, he was able to board troop trains. When necessary he travelled on foot, slept outside, and foraged. Although he came close, he never quite caught up with the Kaiser. He did, however, meet up with Prince von Beulow, a German diplomat who had formerly served as chancellor. Again Kenny laid out the Clan's proposal. Von Beulow advised if he could wait a little longer, his chance of meeting with the Kaiser would improve. However Kenny, deciding that he had fulfilled his mission to relay the message to the German government, made plans to return to America. But by now he could no longer retrace his steps, his retreat having been cut off by the progress of the war. He headed to Rotterdam where he missed the last ship for New York by several hours, and decided to travel back to New York via Ireland.

He travelled uneventfully although anxiously through England, and arrived in Dublin. He met immediately with Tom Clarke who assured him that, contrary to what Kenny believed, Kenny was being followed by British intelligence. Clarke gave Kenny an oral report to give to Devoy: the hardliners had control of the Irish Volunteer Committee and would strongly protest John Redmond's attempted control of the Volunteers. Clarke felt that the threat of conscription into the British Army would alienate Redmond's followers, who would ultimately abandon him. Clarke urged Kenny to pass on his sentiments when he saw Padraig Pearse the next day at St. Enda's School, and asked him to get Padraic Pearse's views on the manifesto. Kenny reported back to Clarke that Pearse was in complete accord. Clarke passed the same enquiry on to Eoin MacNeill, head of the Irish Volunteers, and James Connolly, head of the Citizens Army, that night. Kenny reported all opinions back to Devoy in New York.

== Mission to Ireland – money for guns ==
On his return to New York, Kenny immediately met with Sir Roger Casement and John Devoy, both of whom were pleased with the way the trip had gone. He also met with Joseph McGarrity of Philadelphia and John McGarry of Chicago who debriefed him on the trip. In November, Kenny was again asked to take a trip – this time to deliver money and the promise of support to Ireland and to bring back reports on conditions in Ireland and messages from the "Home Office". Leaving New York on 14 November 1914, Kenny successfully passed through several British checkpoints, arriving safely in Dublin on 28 November. According to plan, he telegraphed "Arrived well “ to indicate his safe arrival ("arrived" would indicate that he had been held up by the British and it would be necessary to hand off the money to another courier)[9].

He delivered £3000 to The O'Rahilly at the Irish Volunteers Headquarters, 41 Kildare Street, in Dublin. Owen MacNeill handed him a receipt for the money, as well as receipts for money sent over previously – receipts were not sent through the mail where they could be intercepted and used to follow the money trail. It was decided that all future contributions from American should be sent to Owen MacNeill at the Irish Volunteers, whether for the Irish Volunteers or the Irish Republican Brotherhood (I.R.B.), since all contributions to the I.R.B. were liable to confiscation.

Over the next few weeks, Kenny met many times, both socially and at organizational meetings, with Tom Clarke, Padraig Pearse, The O'Rahilly, Thomas MacDonagh, Joseph Mary Plunkett, Diarmuid Lynch, Bulmer Hobson. The "Home Office" were depending on the Clan in New York for guns, ammunition, funds, and military help for the planned rebellion. The recent landing of 1700 rifles in Howth had resulted in the British cutting all shipments and manufacturing of arms in Ireland. Plans were discussed to smuggle guns through the Blaskets or Achill Island. It was decided that all future shipments of guns should either use the English service cartridges or come with an ample supply of ammunition. Men who could handle explosives were badly needed, as were trained military officers. Plans were made for MacDonagh to contact ex-US Army veterans then living in Ireland, using a list Kenny had given him. Britain had suppressed the publication of newspapers Sinn Féin, Irish Freedom, Ireland, and the Irish Worker, and had banned the Gaelic American. The remaining newspapers were heavily fined for printing uncensored news. Codes could not be sent through the mail, and all telegrams were paraphrased to disguise their messages. Any communication between Ireland and America had to be done by messenger, from memory (nothing could be written down), with only unknown messengers being used and then, only one time.

At the time, the leadership in Dublin believed that conscription was imminent, and would be preceded by arrests of the IRB and Irish Volunteers leadership. They later learned that the British feared that this course would meet with violent opposition, exposing the myth of Irish solidarity with Britain during the war. However, Clarke and McDermott, fearing wholesale arrests of the leadership, sent the names of a second and third line of command to the Clan in New York. Fearful that Kenny would be searched, they decided instead to send it via Father Liam O'Donnell, who left for America several days before Kenny. Kenny memorised a list of trusted contacts in London that the Clan could use.

Kenny arrived back in New York, via Liverpool, on 19 December 1914. With the exception of Eoin MacNeil, the lives of virtually everyone Kenny met in Dublin during his second Clan-na-Gael mission would be forfeit in the April 1916 Easter Rising and its train of executions. He eulogised the men and women he met in Dublin on his second mission: "They were the stuff of which is made the heroes and martyrs whose statues adorn our public squares and whose names are canonized in our churches. Yet they were condemned as little less than criminals by some who now profess that their greatest desire is to emulate them. They were derided as visionaries, yet Ireland is well on the way towards which they would have led".

Kenny documented his missions in a series of articles in the Gaelic American newspaper.

== Death ==
Kenny lived out the rest of his life in New York City. He served as business manager of the Gaelic American until around 1921. He continued to remain active in political affairs, and to publish his work in the Gaelic American. He died at the age of 77 on 27 December 1924, in St. Vincent's Hospital in Manhattan. His death was mourned by a number of Irish organisations in the city, and a special Mass was sponsored by the Cumman na mBan, which wrote of him: "The organization feels that in the death of John Kenny they have lost one of their most valued friends, and one of the sincerest, noblest, and most intelligent friends of Ireland who was ever ready to assist wholeheartedly and unselfishly ... a soul that never valued the material things of this world".
