= Seán Russell =

Irish republican

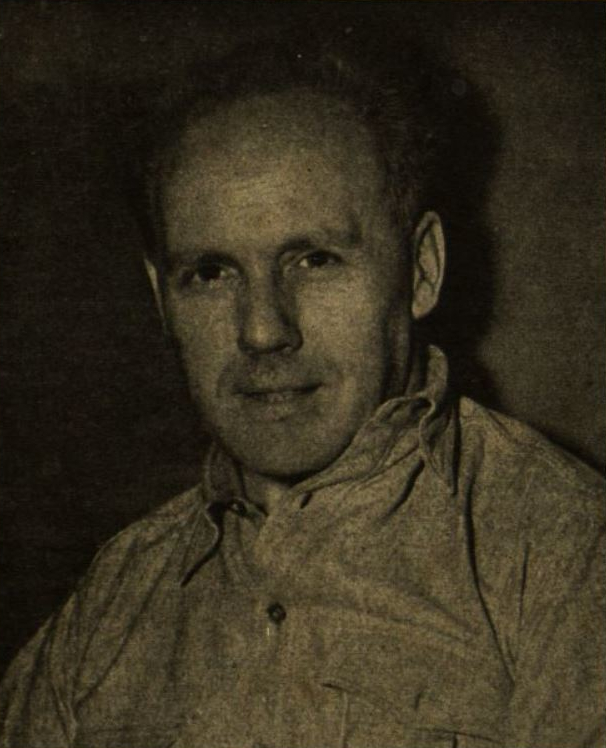

Chief of Staff of the IRA
- In office 1938 – April 1939
- Preceded by: Mick Fitzpatrick
- Succeeded by: Stephen Hayes

Personal details
- Born: 13 October 1893 41 Lower Buckingham Street, Dublin, Ireland
- Died: 14 August 1940 (aged 46) U-65, Atlantic Ocean, 100 miles (160 km) off Galway, Ireland

Military service
- Branch/service: Irish Volunteers; Irish Republican Army; Anti-Treaty IRA
- Battles/wars: Easter Rising; Irish War of Independence; Irish Civil War; Sabotage Campaign

Seán Russell (13 October 1893 – 14 August 1940) was an Irish republican who participated in the Easter Rising of 1916, held senior positions in the Irish Republican Army during the Irish War of Independence and Irish Civil War, and was Chief of Staff of the IRA from c. 1938 to April 1939 upon the onset of World War II. It was under Russell's leadership that the IRA began the Sabotage Campaign, in which the group began bombing civil, economic and military infrastructure in the United Kingdom, primarily England, between 1939 and 1940. In the same period, Russell actively collaborated with Nazi Germany; in early 1940 he travelled to Germany, where he personally met with German foreign minister Joachim von Ribbentrop and spent three months training in the use of explosives. In August 1940 Russell was to return to Ireland as part of a joint IRA/German plan entitled Operation Dove, however, Russell died aboard a Nazi German Kriegsmarine U-boat transporting him home following a sudden stomach illness and he was subsequently buried at sea.

== Early life ==
Born John Angelo Russell at 41 Lower Buckingham Street, Dublin, in 1893, he was one of the ten children of James Russell, a clerk, and Mary L'Estrange, both of whom were originally from County Westmeath.

== Irish revolutionary period ==
Russell joined the Irish Volunteers in 1913. He participated in the 1916 Easter Rising as the section commander in Dublin Brigade's 2nd Battalion E Company, under Thomas MacDonagh. During the Rising he fought at the Metropole Hotel where he was appointed second-in-command by Oscar Traynor. Following the Rising he was interned in Frongoch and Knutsford. He joined the Irish Republican Army in 1919.

After the Irish War of Independence began, he was attached to the IRA General Headquarters Staff and became IRA Director of Munitions in 1920 following the death of Peadar Clancy. Prior to this he was Vice-Brigadier of the Dublin Brigade, again appointed by Oscar Traynor. Russell was involved in the planning of the execution of the Cairo Gang which took place on Bloody Sunday, 1920.

During the Irish Civil War, he fought against the Anglo-Irish Treaty with the Anti-Treaty IRA. Russell was interned along with Ernie O'Malley (the assistant chief of staff of the Anti-Treaty IRA during the Irish Civil War) in the Curragh Camp and was released on 17 July 1924, well over a year after the end of hostilities. During his imprisonment he undertook a 41 day hunger strike In 1925, after the civil war, he was jailed in Mountjoy Prison but escaped on 25 November in a breakout he helped organise.

== Post-Civil War activism ==
Russell was one of those within the much-reduced IRA pushing for more revolutionary activities in 1925. That year, he and Gerald Boland travelled to the Soviet Union on an IRA weapons-buying mission. They entered the country legally on a visa, arriving in Leningrad on a steamer from Hamburg, Germany. On his return from Moscow, Russell reported back to Seán Lemass. He was appointed IRA quartermaster general in 1927 and held that position until 1936. From 1929 to 1931, he travelled widely throughout Ireland, reorganising the IRA. Russell was due to give the oration at the 1931 Bodenstown commemoration but was arrested on its eve.

He visited the United States in late 1932. During the Northern Ireland rail strike of 1933, he organised IRA intervention from Belfast. Russell remained aloof from the IRA's political debates and, following the split of 1934, chaired the court-martial of Mick Price and Peadar O'Donnell who had left the IRA to form the left-wing Republican Congress. He met Éamon de Valera, President of the Executive Council of the Irish Free State at Government Buildings during 1934, to discuss potentially uniting the IRA and Fianna Fáil. In return for political support, De Valera asked for the IRA to lay down their arms and cease any overt actions. Russell was open to the idea, but would only agree to IRA inactivity for 5 years, believing that sufficient time for Fianna Fáil to declare an outright Irish Republic. De Valera turned down the time-bound offer.

In October 1936 Russell wrote to the German ambassador to the United States, and apologised on behalf of the Irish people for the refusal of the de Valera government to grant landing rights to the German air service. In the same communication, Russell informed the ambassador that he would be willing to cooperate with the Germans in any future military conflicts they found themselves in.

While in the United States during 1936, he seems to have conceived, along with Joseph McGarrity, the plan for the bombing campaign in England. In January 1937, Russell was accused by the IRA leadership of misappropriating funds and was court martialled. He had also embarked on his American tour without Army Council permission. He stayed out of Dublin until October 1937, when he approached the IRA leadership in an attempt to convince them that the campaign in England should go ahead.

== Chief of Staff of the IRA ==
In April 1938, an IRA General Army Convention was held, and Russell and his supporters, including McGarrity and IRA members from Northern Ireland, secured enough support to get a majority on the IRA Army Executive and to have him re-instated in the organisation and elected to the Army Council in what has been described as a takeover by historian Brian Hanley. Following Russell's election, Tom Barry, John Joe Sheehy, and Tomás Óg MacCurtain immediately resigned from the IRA, with Barry denouncing Russell's planned bombing campaign as "doomed to failure as the Fenian dynamite campaign" and "unethical and immoral", while subsequently, more conservative Republicans such as Patrick McGrath and Seamus O'Donovan returned to the fold. Barry would later claim that Russell and his supporters had said that the German American Bund would fund their planned attack on the United Kingdom.

Before starting the bombing campaign, Russell moved to shore up the political credibility of the IRA in January 1939. As Chief of Staff, he was able to secure a powerful symbolic gesture from the "rump" of the Second Dáil, that is to say, elected members of the Second Dáil who remained hardline Republicans. Seven of these former TDs transferred what authority they believed they had as representatives of the Second Dáil to the IRA army council, thus, in their minds, rendering it the legitimate governing body of Ireland. The IRA felt this move gave them the authority to formally declare war on the United Kingdom, which they would almost immediately do. The Sabotage Campaign commenced some days later with bombing attacks on a number of English cities. In February 1939 Russell was also involved in a meeting with German Intelligence (Abwehr) agent Oscar Pfaus.

=== Activity in the United States, 1939 ===
To pursue the propaganda arm of the S-Plan, Russell travelled to the United States in April 1939. Prior to leaving, he stood down as IRA chief of staff and was replaced by Stephen Hayes. The aim of his journey was to 'show the flag' and place himself in the public mind as the leader of militant Irish nationalism. (Note: Russell also had another motive – there was concern that the main pipeline of financial aid to the IRA, the profits from Clan na Gael's Irish Hospital Sweepstake fund, were being skimmed. See Hull P.61.) While there Russell made several public addresses. He was trailed by Federal Bureau of Investigation "G-Men" at the request of Scotland Yard, and then detained by the United States Immigration Service at the Detroit border with Windsor, Ontario during the American visit of King George VI. The incident immediately aroused enormous indignation among Irish-Americans, culminating in a protest by 76 Irish-descended members of Congress. They demanded an explanation from President Roosevelt about the 'Russell Case', failing which they would not participate in the Congressional reception for the King.

While in the United States, Russell met with his Clan na Gael host Joseph McGarrity and Robert Monteith, one of Casement's colleagues in 1916 and, at that time, director of Father Charles Coughlin's National Union for Social Justice. Anxious to skip his bail, which expired on 16 April, Russell made contact, through the offices of McGarrity, with German agent 'V-Rex', also known as Carl Rekowski. 'V-Rex' contacted John McCarthy, a steward on the steamer George Washington, berthed in Tampa, Florida. The George Washington then sailed to fascist Italy. McCarthy met Abwehr agent 'Professor' Franz Fromme in Genoa on 19 and 30 March 1940. That meeting arranged for Russell's journey across the Atlantic, arrival in Genoa on 1 May, and reception in Berlin four days later.

== Nazi Germany ==
Arriving in Berlin in May 1940, Russell was informed of Operation Mainau, the plan to parachute Hermann Görtz into Ireland. Russell was asked to brief Görtz on Ireland before his departure that night, but missed his takeoff from the Kassel-Fritzlar airfield.

Accorded the privileges of a diplomat and provided with a villa and a chauffeur-driven car, Russell's liaison officer while in Nazi Germany was SS-Standartenführer Edmund Veesenmayer. Veesenmayer indicated particular interest that the IRA had no clear idea of what form an Irish government would take in the event of a German victory. During Russell's time in Berlin, he would have at least one personal meeting with the German foreign minister Joachim von Ribbentrop.

By 20 May 1940, Russell began training with Abwehr in the use of the latest German explosive ordnance at the training area for the Brandenburg Regiment, the 'Quenzgut', where he observed trainees and instructors working with sabotage materials in a field environment. As he received explosives training, his return to Ireland with a definite sabotage objective was planned by German Army Intelligence. His total training time with German Intelligence was over three months.

== Operation Dove and death aboard U-65 ==
On 15 July 1940, Frank Ryan – an IRA man who had fought on the Republican side in the Spanish Civil War and was captured by Franco forces – was handed over to the Abwehr and taken to Germany. The capture of the German agents from Operation Lobster I did not prevent Abwehr Chief Wilhelm Canaris sanctioning the transport of Russell to Ireland. Both Russell and Frank Ryan, who had arrived in Berlin on 4 August, departed from Wilhelmshaven on 8 August, aboard U-65 – the mission was titled Operation Dove ("Unternehmen Taube" in German).

Russell became ill during the journey and complained of stomach pains. The crew of U-65 did not include a doctor and Russell died on 14 August, 100 miles (160 km) short of Galway. He was buried at sea and the mission was aborted. Following the return of the submarine to Germany, an inquiry was set up by the Abwehr into Russell's death. The inquiry included the interrogation of U-65's crew and Frank Ryan. The conclusion was that Russell had suffered a burst gastric ulcer and, without medical attention, he had died.

A number of conspiracy theories arose around the subject of Russell's death, including that he was poisoned on board the ship, shot by the British Secret Service in France, or murdered by Kurt Haller. However, Russell's brother, Patrick, confirmed after the war that Russell suffered from pre-existing stomach problems.

== Legacy ==
Russell's legacy is deeply contested. He became an idol of traditionalist republicanism during the 1950s, and numerous republican organisations continue to commemorate him as an Irish patriot; Sinn Féin (its O'Malley/Russell cumann is his namesake), Republican Sinn Féin, the Irish Republican Socialist Party and Saoradh have all spoken in defence of Russell. Conversely, many other groups from across the political spectrum have condemned him as a Nazi collaborator. It has been claimed he "cared little for Nazi ideology" and he was accused of being a communist spy in the 1920s. Irish historian Brian Hanley states that while Russell was uninterested in political debate and was committed to the use of armed force, Russell's leadership unquestionably saw the IRA shift to the political right and become permeated with those with pro-fascist and pro-German sentiments. Journalist and IRA Chief of IRA during the late 1950s Seán Cronin said that of "all the IRA leaders of the 1920s and 30s…, [he was] probably the most conservative, politically and socially".

Speaking in 1958, Erwin Lahousen, a member of the Abwehr and later the German Resistance, whom Russell engaged with in Germany, said that Russell disagreed with Nazi philosophy and strongly rejected attempts to convert him. Lahousen stated that Russell told him "I am not a Nazi. I’m not even pro-German. I am an Irishman fighting for the independence of Ireland." and that "If it suits Germany to give us help to achieve independence, I am willing to accept it, but no more, and there must be no strings attached" In August 1940 an open letter was published by the IRA leadership while Russell was still alive, stating that if "German forces should land in Ireland, they will land...as friends and liberators of the Irish people". Readers were informed that Germany desired neither "territory nor...economic penetration" in Ireland but simply wanted Ireland to play its part in the "reconstruction" of a "free and progressive Europe". The Third Reich was also praised as the "energising force" of European politics and the "guardian" of national freedom.

Historian Caoimhe Nic Dhaibheid states that Russell's motivation was to obtain arms and money from Germany to further Irish republican aims. Historian Brian Hanley has opined that "Sean Russell was not a Nazi, but he was politically blind to the realities and to what it meant to collaborate with the Nazis", a view echoed by historian Gerard Shannon who has described Russell as politically naïve, and also by the one-time editor of An Phoblacht Mícheál Mac Donncha who has called Russell "extremely naïve" and "narrow-minded in his approach" but also "courageous and selfless". The National Graves Association has defended Russell from accusations of fascism saying "He went to Germany, the Soviet Union and the US seeking arms. If people want to call him a fascist they would also have to claim he was a communist."

In September 2003 Mary Lou McDonald spoke at a rally to commemorate Russell held at the memorial site. The same rally was also addressed by then Provisional IRA Army Council member Brian Keenan who said:

I don't know what was in the depth of Seán Russell's thinking down the years, but I am sure he was never far from Pearse's own position, who said, as a patriot, preferring death to slavery, I know no other way. There are things worse than bloodshed, and slavery is one of them. We are not and will not be slaves.

In 2020, Fianna Fáil leader Micheál Martin criticised McDonald for her attendance at the 2003 rally, stating "The idea someone was working with the Nazis to undermine Britain when Europe was in great peril and [that] he should be commemorated is something that Sinn Féin need a wake-up call on" as well as adding that he thought Russell was "wrong" and that "collaborating with the Nazis should not be condoned in any way". McDonald stated that Russell was "misguided" but said she did not regret her attendance at the rally and stated that Russell was a "militarist" and not a "Nazi collaborator". In 2022, politician and journalist Shane Ross condemned Russell as one of "the most unsavoury supporters of terrorism in the history of the republican movement".

In 2025, Irish republican and historian Pádraig Óg Ó Ruairc offered the view that Russell was "blind-militist" without ideology who would have aligned with Islamic State had they existed and could have aided his anti-British aims. Ó Ruairc stated it is unequivocal that Russell collaborated with the Nazis and that Russell was not someone the Republican movement should commemorate.

== Attacks on memorial to Russell ==
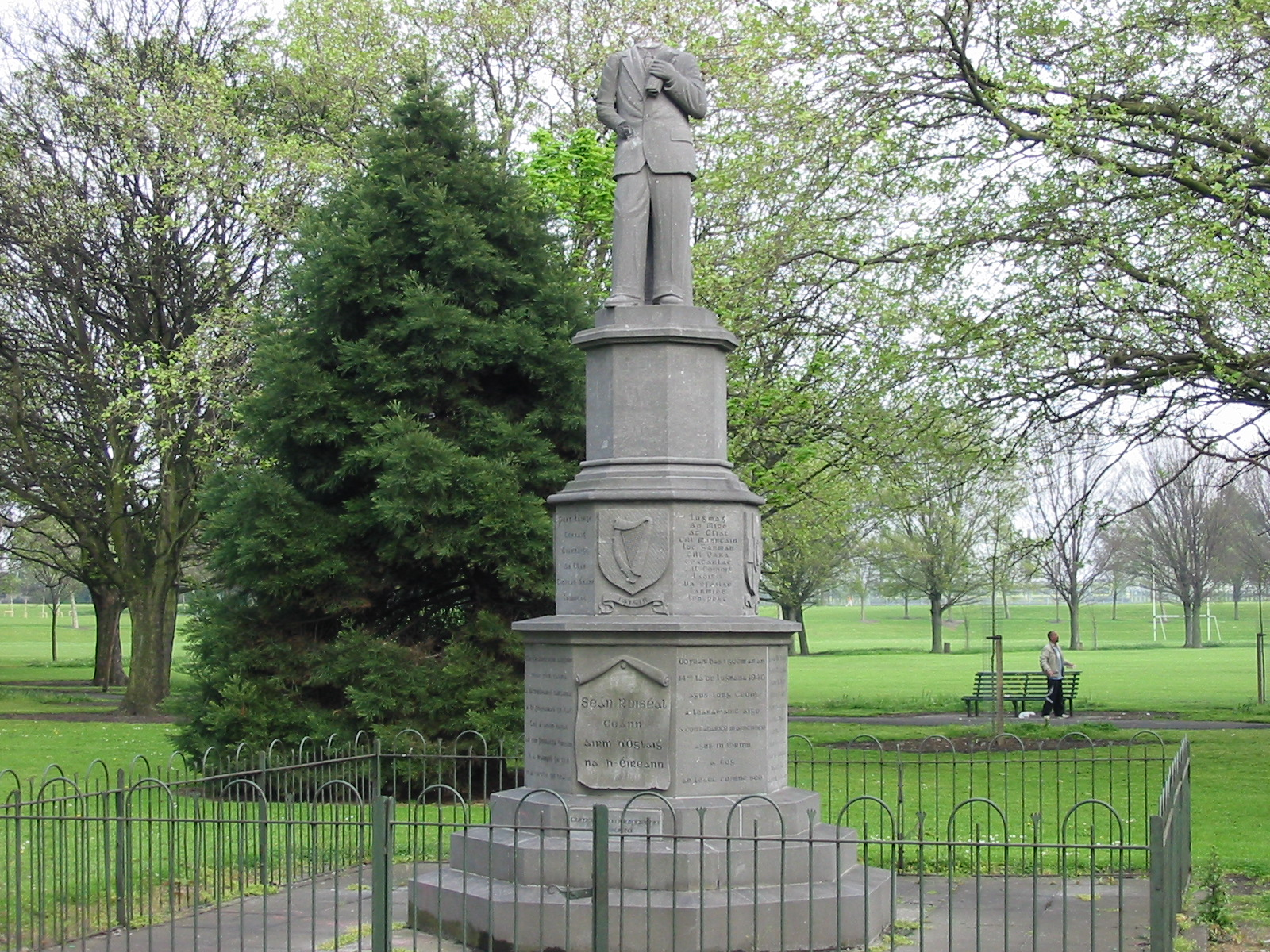
The statue was decapitated in 2004

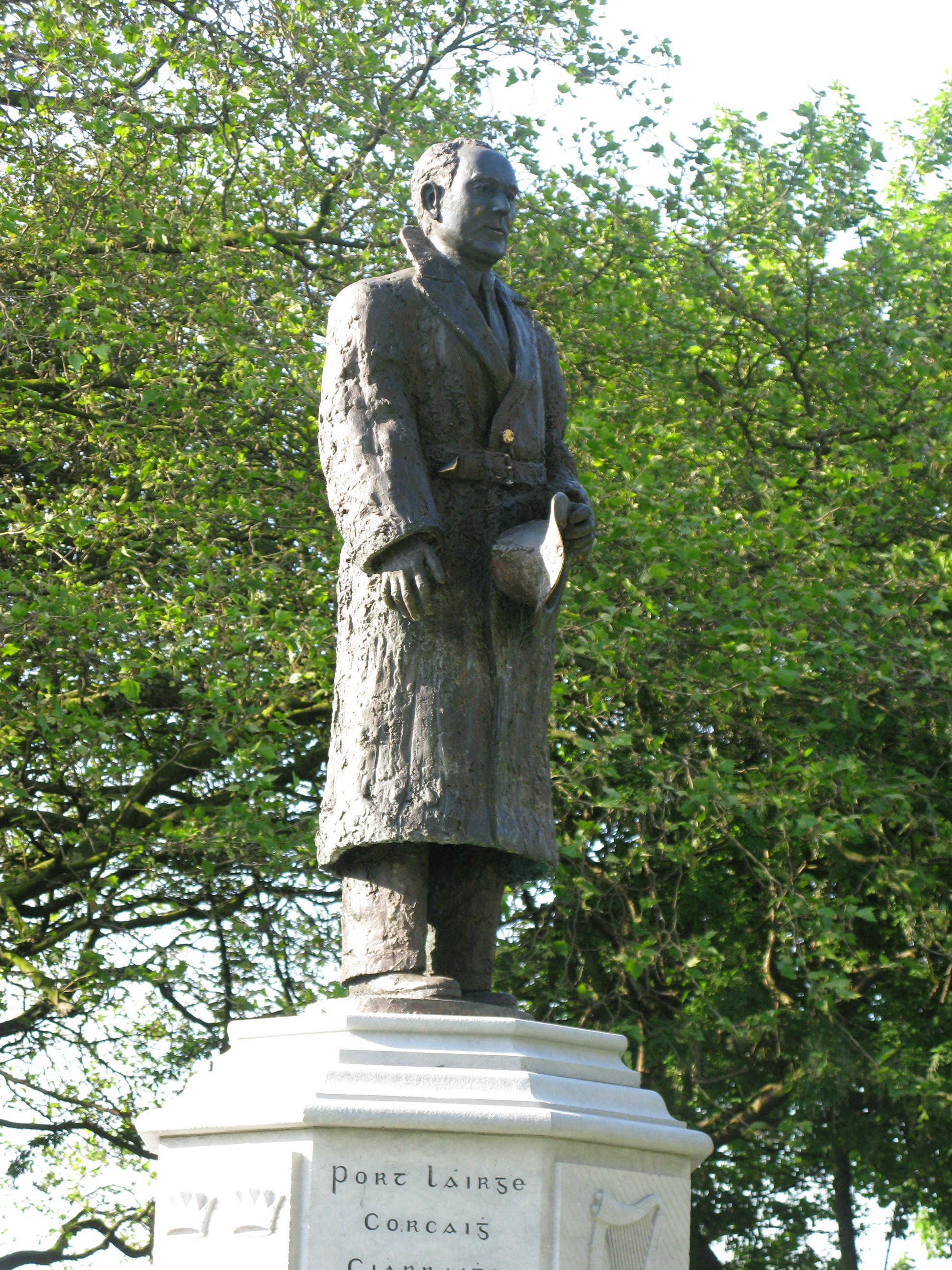
Replacement bronze statue in 2009

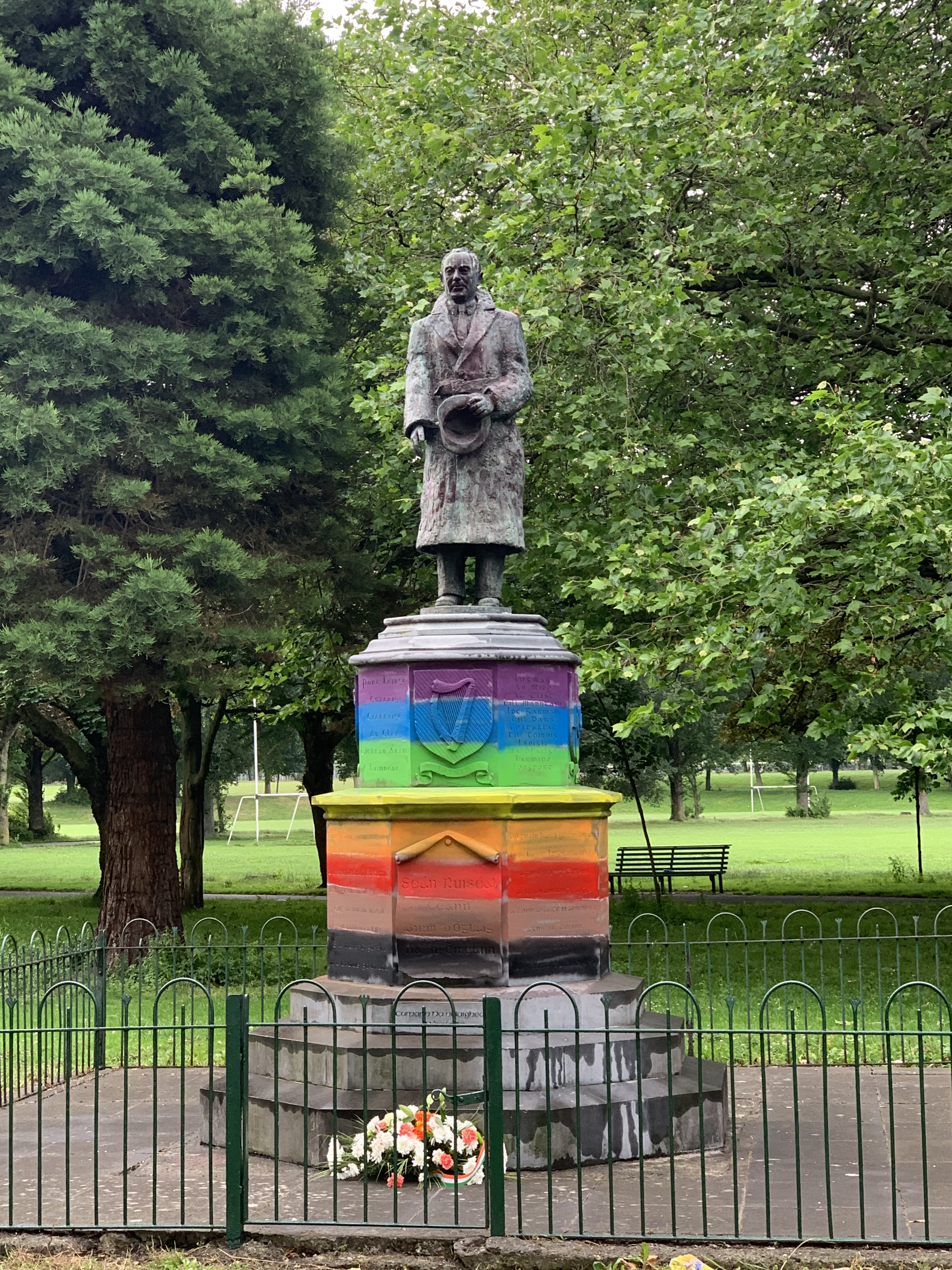
The statue spraypainted with the LGBT rainbow in 2020

A statue commemorating Russell was erected by republicans in Fairview Park, Dublin on 9 September 1951. It is reported 1,000 Irish republicans attended the unveiling of the statue, including future IRA Chiefs of Staff Cathal Goulding and Ruairí Ó Brádaigh, as well as members of Clan na Gael and Cumann na mBan. The event was monitored by the Garda Special Branch.

The statue has since been subject to vandalism; In May 1952 paint was smeared on the statue and in July 1953, the raised right arm was broken off by right-wing radicals, who explained the vandalism by claiming the arm had been raised in a communist salute rather than oratorical pose. The damaged arm was replaced posed downward instead of raised. The 31 December 2004 attack saw the decapitation of the memorial by an unnamed group, described by the Sunday Independent as anti-fascist. The memorial's right forearm was also removed. A statement issued to the press in justification of the vandalism read (verbatim):

Six million Jews, thousands of political dissidents, homosexuals, Roma people, Soviet prisoners of war and the disabled were put to death by the fascist hate machine that overran and terrified Europe from 1939 to 45. Sean Russell was one of many nationalist fanatics who looked to Hitler for political and military support in the IRA's quest to reunify Ireland at the point of the bayonets of the Gestapo. At the Wannsee Conference, the infamous Nazi gathering that planned the "Final Solution", the Jewish community in Ireland was marked down for annihilation. Having freed Ireland from British rule, the Nazis expected their collaborators to help them round up Dublin's Jews and ship them off to Auschwitz. That was the price Sean Russell was prepared to pay to end partition.

Ógra Shinn Féin condemned the vandalism saying "Those who carried it out clearly know very little about Seán Russell or what he stood for."

After the missing pieces of the memorial proved difficult to retrieve, a spokesman for The National Graves Association announced that the memorial to Seán Russell would be rebuilt in more permanent bronze to deter vandals. In May 2009, the plinth was cleaned and the new bronze was erected. Allegedly, the new statue has alarms to detect attempted vandalism, as well as a GPS tracker. According to historian Gerard Shannon, the original pieces of the statue were eventually recovered and reconstructed in Cashel folk village in Cashel, County Tipperary, where it stands as a duplicate.

On 9 July 2009, the plinth of the memorial was again vandalised with graffiti proclaiming Russell to have been a Nazi.

In June 2020, Leo Varadkar suggested that the statue of Seán Russell may need to be removed because of his collaboration with the Nazis.

Later, on 23 June 2020 the base of the statue was painted in the colours of the Rainbow flag. The paint was later removed. Fianna Fáil Lord Mayor Tom Brabazon condemned the painting of the base.

== Sources ==
- Culleton, Brendan & Maldea, Irina, Seamróg agus Swastica (English: Shamrock & Swastika), Dublin (Akajava Films), 2002. (Broadcast on TG4, 24 January 2002).
- Hanley, Brian, The IRA. 1926–1936, Dublin (Four Courts Press), 2002. ISBN 1-85182-721-8
- Terence O'Reilly, Hitler's Irishmen, (Mercier Press), 2008 ISBN 1-85635-589-6
- Mark M. Hull, Irish Secrets. German Espionage in Wartime Ireland 1939–1945 2003. ISBN 978-0-7165-2756-5
- Enno Stephan, Spies in Ireland 1963. ISBN 1-131-82692-2 (reprint)
- Carolle J. Carter, The Shamrock and the Swastika 1977. ISBN 0-87015-221-1
- Detroit Free Press, 7 June 1939, page 11, "Irish Chieftain Is Kept In Jail".
