= William Mackey Lomasney =

William Mackey Lomasney (1841 – 13 December 1884) was a member of the Fenian Brotherhood and the Clan na Gael who, during the Fenian dynamite campaign organized by Jeremiah O'Donovan Rossa, was killed in a failed attempt to dynamite London Bridge.

Born the son of Irish immigrants in Cincinnati, Ohio (although other accounts claim he emigrated with his parents to Detroit, Michigan at the age of 3), Mackey served in the American Civil War and later became involved in the Irish nationalist movement. Travelling to Ireland to take part in the Fenian Rising in 1865, he was arrested by British authorities in Cork and ordered to leave the country along with John McCafferty.

However, upon his return two years later, he and James X. O'Brien participated in the capture of the Ballyknockane Constabulary barracks. He also briefly captured and held the Monning Martello tower near Fota Island in Cork Harbour; this tower is believed to have been the only Martello tower ever captured. After the rebellion's end, he continued raiding gunshops and coastguard stations throughout Cork for over twelve months before his eventual capture by authorities on 7 February 1868 in which he Mortally wounded RIC Sub Constable Thomas Casey (died 22 February 1868).

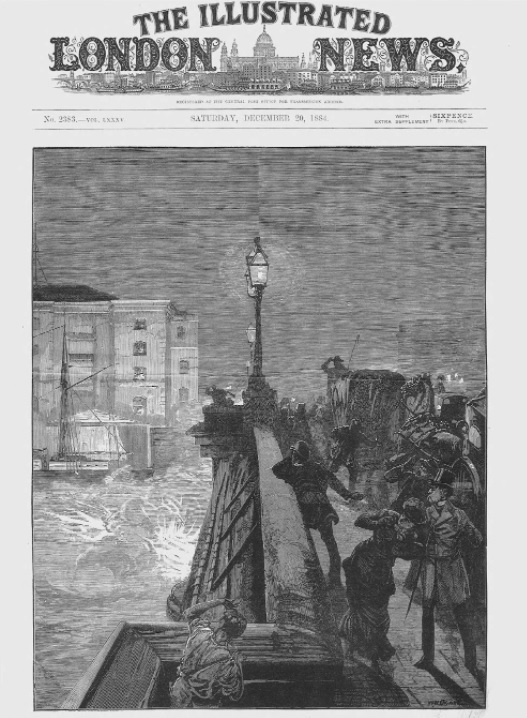
Illustration by W. H. Overend, Illustrated London News, 20 December 1884

Tried for murder and treasonous felony, he was sentenced to twelve years penal servitude on 21 March 1868. While imprisoned in Millbank Prison, he became acquainted with John Devoy. He was released under a general amnesty in 1871 on condition that he return to his native country.

Upon his return to the United States, he settled in Detroit, Michigan and opened a book and stationery store. A later member of the American Land League, he became involved in the Clan na Gael and had been in France to make a withdrawal from the treasury of the Irish Republican Brotherhood from which he was to return to Ireland to plan for a possible rebellion with Devoy. However, as a wave of dynamite bombings occurred in Great Britain during early 1881, he and Devoy would correspond with each other both condemning Rossa's actions and the idea for a "bloodless revolution" in Ireland.

Under an alias he came to London, with another man who claimed to be his brother. Renting a store as a bookshop, they began their bombing campaign. On the early evening of 13 December 1884, Mackey rowed out in a boat with his accomplice John Fleming with the intention of destroying London bridge. The attack on London Bridge failed when the dynamite they were attaching to a pier exploded prematurely. The remains of one man were found while the remains of the other man were not found; the Clan na Gael paid a pension to Lomasney's widow and four children. While most accounts claim that three men were killed, a Fenian history website reports that only two were killed.

== Sources ==
- Golway, Terry. Irish Rebel: John Devoy and America's Fight for Ireland's Freedom. New York: St. Martin's Press, 1988. ISBN 0-312-30386-6
- Laqueur, Walter. Voices Of Terror: Manifestos, Writings, and Manuals of Al Qaeda, Hamas, and other terrorists from Around the World and Throughout the Ages. New York: Reed Press, 2004.
- Moody, Theodore William; Francis X. Martin and Francis John Byrne. A New History of Ireland. Oxford: Oxford University Press, 2001. ISBN 0-19-821744-7
- Whelehan, Niall, The Dynamiters: Irish Nationalism and Political Violence in the Wider World, 1867–1900 Cambridge: Cambridge University Press, 2012. ISBN 978-1-107-02332-1
