= Diarmuid Lynch =

Irish revolutionary and politician (1878–1950)

- Lynch, c.1914–1923

Teachta Dála
- In office December 1918 – July 1920
- Constituency: Cork South East

Personal details
- Born: Jeremiah Christopher Lynch; 10 January 1878 Tracton, County Cork, Ireland
- Died: 9 October 1950 (aged 72) Minane Bridge, County Cork
- Spouse: Kathleen Mary Quinn (m. 1918)

Military service
- Allegiance: Irish Republic
- Branch/service: Irish Republican Brotherhood
- Battles/wars: Easter Rising

Jeremiah Christopher Lynch (10 January 1878 – 9 November 1950) was an Irish revolutionary from County Cork who was a member of the Irish Republican Brotherhood and became a Sinn Féin TD in the First Dáil. A skilled organiser, he was prominent in Irish American organisations in the United States, where he spent many years.

== Early life ==
Lynch was born in Granig, Tracton, County Cork, to Timothy Lynch, a farmer, and Hannah Dunlea. His mother died from pneumonia in July 1878 when Lynch was an infant; his father, who had remarried, died when Diarmuid was thirteen years of age.

In his autobiography, Lynch recalls being taken to a political meeting in Cork city by his father in 1886 which was addressed by Charles Stewart Parnell. He also describes attending a monster Land League rally at Minane Bridge at which William O'Brien and Dr. Charles Tanner MP spoke. He was politically influenced by his teachers, particularly Michael McCarthy, headmaster at Knocknamana National School.

== Career ==
Like other rural Irishmen of his generation, such as Michael Collins and J. J. Walsh, Lynch found employment in the Postal service. He began working as a sorting clerk in the Cork GPO and studied at Skerry's College for entrance to the Civil Service. In an open competitive examination he secured a place as a "Boy Clerk" at the Mount Pleasant money order office, London. Mount Pleasant would play a very significant part in the growth of the Irish Republican Brotherhood (IRB), because it was here that individuals such as Collins and Sam Maguire first became acquainted. Lynch himself would become a member of the IRB Supreme Council. While in London he played hurling with the London Gaels.

=== Migration to USA ===
Lynch accepted an offer of employment from his uncle Cornelius Dunlea in New York and his skill as an organiser was soon recognised having joined the New York Philo-Celtic Society, established for the preservation of the Irish language and culture in the Irish-American nationalist community, in the summer of 1897. By December of that year, he had been elected secretary. Within a short period, membership in the organisation had almost quadrupled. Lynch "was convinced that restoration of the Irish language would increase the self respect of the Irish people". His activities in New York, and in particular his work for the Irish language, saw him elevated to the position of the State President of the Gaelic League of the State of New York. It was this role which would bring him to the attention of the Clan na Gael leadership of John Devoy and Judge Daniel F. Cohalan, two of the most important figures in Irish-American politics. Lynch's persuasive powers influenced Cohalan to accept "that the propagation of the language, instead of hindering the objective of the Clan, was essential to its achievement".

As Lynch's reputation grew so did his sphere of influence. Before he returned to Ireland in 1907, he could boast a circle of friends that included Jeremiah O'Donovan Rossa, Dr Thomas Addis Emmet, Ricard O'Sullivan Burke, John J. Breslin and Tom Clarke.

Having spent almost eleven years in America, Lynch decided to return to Ireland. He had been back in 1902 for a short period, when, with the aid of Liam de Róiste, he had organised an Irish cultural feis at Minane Bridge.

== Return to Ireland ==
On his return to Ireland, he was employed by Thomas McKenzie & Sons, Dublin, an agricultural supplies wholesaler. He later joined the IRB at the invitation of Seán T. O'Kelly. By 1911 he had been appointed to the IRB Supreme Council as the divisional representative for Munster.

Lynch played a role in the planning of the 1916 Easter Rising. He was chosen by Patrick Pearse to go to Tralee and identify the best area to land German arms. Lynch reported directly to Pearse that Fenit would be the most secure location for the proposed landing. At this time, he was the only member of the IRB Supreme Council to attend meetings of the even more secret IRB Military Council.

After Eoin MacNeill cancelled the orders for the planned manoeuvres over the Easter period, Lynch attended a hastily arranged meeting at 27 Hardwick Street, which also included Pearse, Thomas MacDonagh, Joseph Mary Plunkett and Seán Mac Diarmada, at which it was decided to go ahead with the Rising.

== Easter Rising ==
Lynch was aide-de-camp to James Connolly and staff captain in the GPO during the Rising. He was also considered the last man to leave the GPO. Initially sentenced to death, his sentence was commuted to ten years of penal servitude following representations made by American President Woodrow Wilson on account of Lynch holding American citizenship. Lynch was jailed in England but released from Pentonville Prison on 16 June 1917.

== Sinn Féin reorganisation ==
Lynch became active again and, along with Collins and Thomas Ashe, participated in the reorganisation of the IRB. After the 1917 Sinn Féin Ard Fheis, Lynch held three senior posts in the IRB, Sinn Féin and the Irish Volunteers.

His position as Sinn Féin food controller resulted in his deportation to England in 1918. During this period much of the Irish agricultural produce was being sent to Britain to support the war effort. Lynch ordered that a specific shipment of pigs at the North wall ready for shipment to England be slaughtered for the Irish market and the money given to owners of the stock. He was arrested and sentenced to deportation. Before this was enforced he was secretly married on 24 April 1918. His fiancée, Kathleen Mary Quinn from Celbridge, and a priest were smuggled into Dundalk Jail for the ceremony. This event was a propaganda coup as the British authorities had originally refused permission for the marriage.

== Return to the USA ==
When Lynch was deported to America he thought: "It certainly greatly enhanced the prestige of Sinn Fein...the party of action and not of talk". That party dedicated a new ballad "The Pig Push" to Lynch:

"We'll have pig's cheeks and pork chops enough for you and me,
there'll be rashers for our breakfast and some sausages for tea."

Lynch threateningly said "there'll hear G Division squeal as far off as Berlin".

Shortly afterwards he was appointed Secretary of the Friends of Irish Freedom, originally set up to raise funds and lobby in Washington DC to promote the Irish cause for independence. Under his tenure, the organisation spread nationwide. On 4 March 1919, as a result of its lobbying, Congress voted 216 to 41 to adopt the following motion: "That it is the earnest hope of the United states of America that the peace conference, now sitting in Paris, in passing upon the rights of various peoples, will favourably consider the claims of Ireland to the right of self-determination". While this was not the recognition of the Irish Republic that Lynch, Devoy and Colohan had sought, it was a call for Ireland to present its case at the Versailles Peace Conference.

In the 1918 general election after Eugene Crean stood down, Lynch was returned unopposed while in absentia in America. He became Teachta Dála (TD) in the First Dáil for South East Cork.

=== Tension with de Valera ===
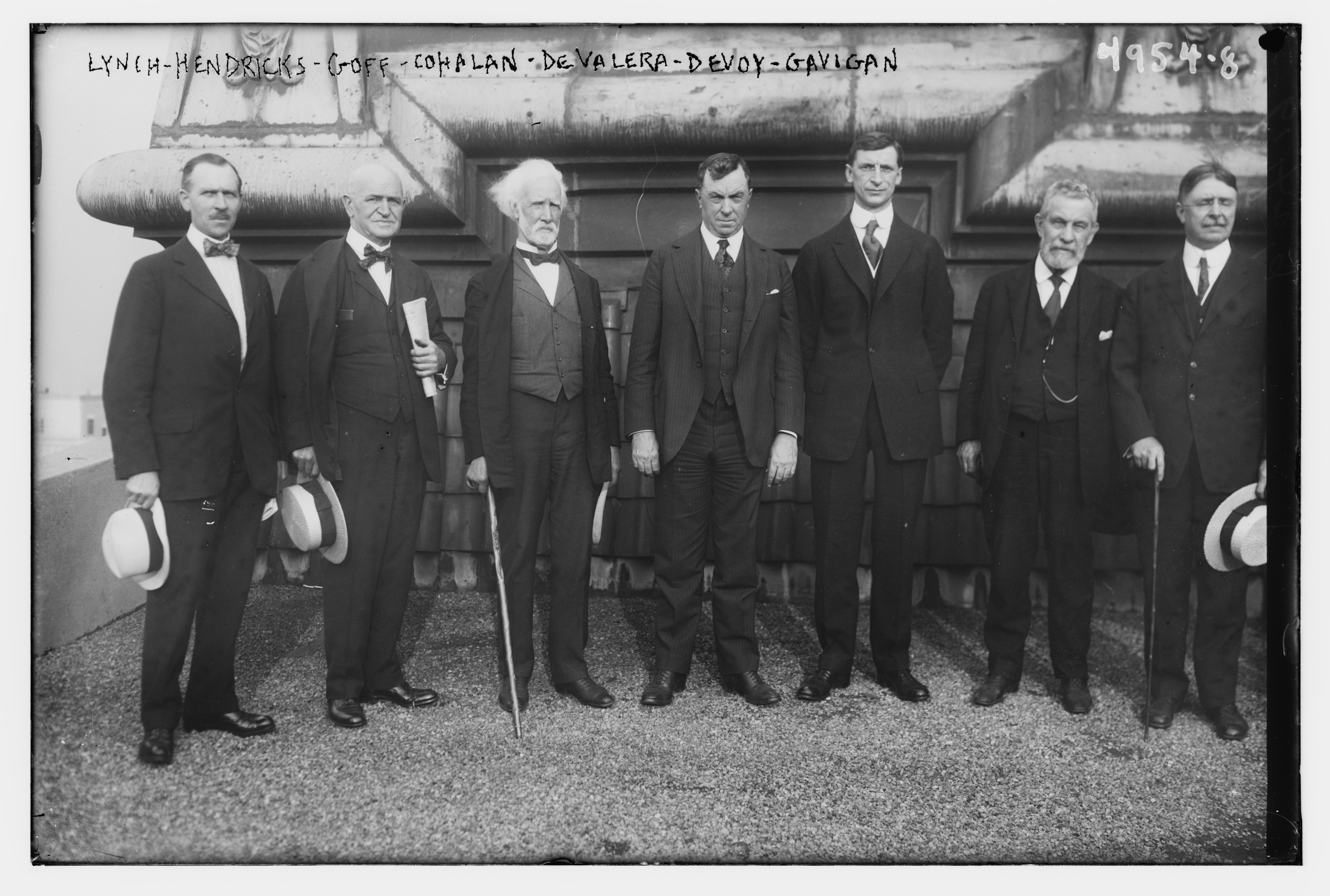
Lynch (left) with Éamon de Valera in 1919

The arrival of Éamon de Valera to America in 1919 was followed by the establishment of a rival organisation to the Friends of Irish Freedom. In 1920, Lynch resigned his Dáil seat in sympathy with Devoy and Colohan. He wrote a letter of resignation in July 1920, which was read out to the Dáil the following month. In it he said: "Differences have arisen since July 1919, between de Valera and the recognised leaders of the movement here as to the proper conduct of the campaign in America for the recognition of the Irish Republic and these circumstances have governed my actions in resigning."

de Valera and Lynch would again become embroiled in a bitter battle in 1929, when associates of the former tried unsuccessfully to claim the unused funds raised by the Friends of Irish Freedom in 1919 and 1920. de Valera sought to claim this money to establish the Irish Press. Lynch's eventual victory in the case was attributable to his record-keeping and organisational skills.

== Civil War and later life ==
Lynch played no part in the Irish Civil War, but along with his IRB comrade Seán O'Hegarty made several unsuccessful attempts to stop it. In an impassioned letter, written in 1922 to the members of Friends of Irish Freedom, he wrote: "Our influence may be exercised towards securing for Ireland the greatest need of the moment – Peace."

In 1933 he returned to Ireland, living initially in Mallow but settling in Tracton, County Cork. He contributed to the work of the Bureau of Military History in collecting witness statements from those who had taken part in the War of Independence and in reviewing historical publications. He attempted to run for the Senate in 1944 but was not successful.

His marriage produced no children. Lynch died in 1950 and his funeral took place at Minane Bridge in County Cork.

Lynch's papers are held by the National Library of Ireland.

== Sources ==
- De Blacam, Aodh, What Sinn Fein stands for: The Irish Republican Movement, its History, Arms and Ideals (Dublin 1921)
- Lynch, Diarmuid & Florence O'Donoghue : The IRB and the 1916 insurrection, Cork: Mercier Press, 1957.
- Group photograph with Harry Boland, de Valera, John Devoy, Liam Mellows and Pat McCartan. New York circ. 1919/'20. From Harry Boland's Irish Revolution ISBN 978-1-85918-386-1
- McCurtan, Patrick, With de Valera in America (New York 1932)
- Novick, Ben, Concerning Revolution: Irish Nationalist Propaganda during the First world War (Dublin 2001)
- O'Broin, Leon, Revolutionary Underground: The Story of the Irish Republican Brotherhood 1858–1924 (Dublin 1976)

Parliament of the United Kingdom
Preceded by Eugene Crean	Member of Parliament for Cork South East; 1918–1922	Constituency abolished
Oireachtas
New constituency	Teachta Dála for Cork South East; 1918–1920	Vacant
