= Joseph McGarrity =

Irish businessman and Clan na Gael activist

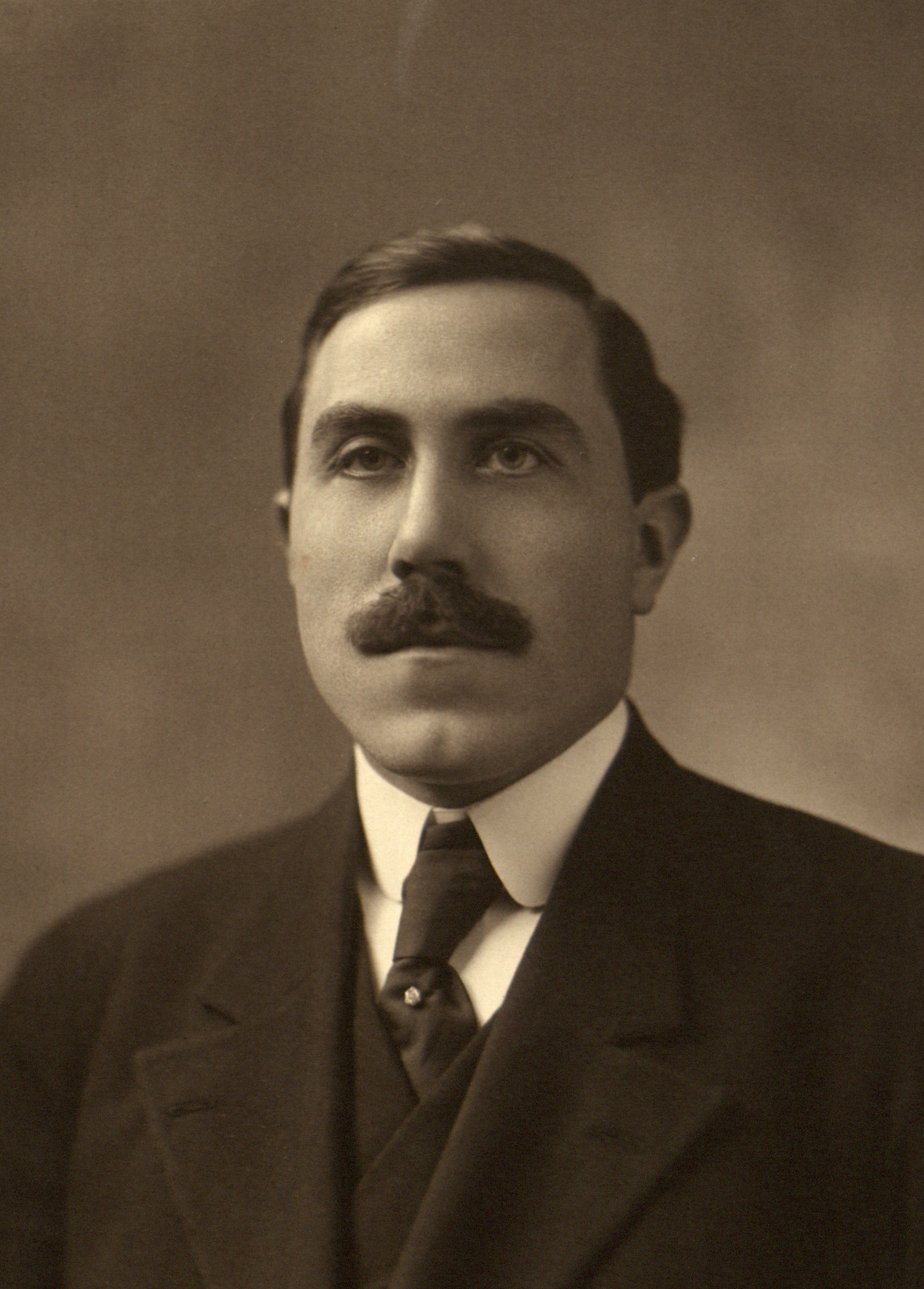
- Born: March 28, 1874; Creggandevesky,Carrickmore, County Tyrone, Ireland
- Died: 4 September 1940 (aged 66)
- Citizenship: American
- Organisation: Clan na Gael
- Movement: Irish Republicanism

Joseph McGarrity (28 March 1874 – 4 September 1940) was an Irish-American political activist best known for his leadership in Clan na Gael in America and his support of Irish Republicanism back in Ireland.

== Early years ==
McGarrity was born in the townland of Creggandevesky, County Tyrone, Ireland in 1874, the son of farmers John McGarrity and the former Catherine Bigley. His family grew up in poverty, motivating his need to immigrate later in life. He grew hearing his father discussing Irish politics, including topics such as the Fenians, the Irish Parliamentary Party, and Irish Home Rule. By the time he was an adult, he had developed a keen interest in politics himself.

He immigrated to the United States in 1892 at the age of 18. He is reputed to have walked to Dublin before boarding a cattle boat to Liverpool disguised as a drover, and then sailing to America using a ticket belonging to someone else. He settled in 4900 Wynfield Ave West Philadelphia, Pennsylvania and became successful in the liquor business; however, his business failed on three occasions, twice due to embezzlement by his business partner.

== Entry into Politics and Irish Republicanism ==
In 1893 he joined Clan na Gael, an Irish organisation based in America committed to aiding the establishment of an independent Irish state. Clan na Gael had been heavily involved with the Fenian Brotherhood that McGarrity had grown up hearing about, and by the latter half of the 19th century had become a sister organisation of the Irish Republican Brotherhood. In the decade just before McGarrity joined, Clan na Gael and the Fenian movement had waged the Fenian dynamite campaign, where they attempted to force the British state to make concessions on Ireland by bombing British Infrastructure. However, this had caused a split within Clan na Gael that was not mended until seven years after McGarrity joined when in 1900 the factions reunited and pleaded to support "the complete independence of the Irish people, and the establishment of an Irish republic.". In the years that followed the 1880s and 1890s, McGarrity is, amongst others, credited with helping to stitch the organisation back together and bring it renewed strength. In July 1914 McGarrity became Chairman of the American Volunteer Fund. That summer military training camps were set up in many parts of Ireland financed by the Volunteer Fund.

McGarrity helped sponsor several Irish Race Conventions and founded and ran a newspaper called The Irish Press from 1918–22 that supported the War of Independence in Ireland. He was the founder of the Philadelphia chapter of Clan Na Gael.

During the First World War, while the US was still neutral, McGarrity was involved in the Hindu–German Conspiracy; he arranged the Annie Larsen arms purchase and shipment from New York to San Diego for India.

When Éamon de Valera arrived in the US in 1919 they struck up an immediate rapport and McGarrity managed de Valera's tour of the US. He persuaded de Valera of the benefits of supporting him and the Philadelphia branch against the New York branch of the Friends of Irish Freedom organisation led by John Devoy and Judge Daniel F. Cohalan. He became president of the American Association for the Recognition of the Irish Republic. He christened his newborn son Éamon de Valera McGarrity, although their relationship became strained upon De Valera's entry back into Dáil Éireann in the Irish Free State.

== Anglo-Irish Treaty and aftermath ==
McGarrity was opposed to the Anglo-Irish Treaty of December 1921. He travelled to Dublin in 1922 and helped bring about the short-lived Collins/De Valera Pact by getting de Valera and Michael Collins together before the 1922 Irish general election.

The Irish Civil War saw a split in Clan na Gael just as it had split Sinn Féin back in Ireland. McGarrity and a minority of Clan na Gael members supported the anti-treaty side but a majority, including Devoy and Cohalan, aligned themselves with the pro-treaty side. Furthermore, in October 1920 Harry Boland informed the Clan na Gael leadership that the IRB would be cutting their ties to the Clan unless the IRB was given more influence over their affairs. Devoy and Cohalan resisted this but McGarrity saw the Clan's connection with the IRB as vital. While McGarrity's faction was initially labelled "Reorganised Clan na Gael", they were able to gain total control of the Clan na Gael name, as Devoy was not able to keep effective organisation of the group. In general, however, the in-fighting amongst the Irish on both sides of the Atlantic was quite disheartening for Irish-Americans and in the years to come neither pro or anti-treaty sides of Clan na Gael saw much in the way of donations.

With the scope of Clan na Gael now narrowed, and Devoy and Cohalan removed from the picture, McGarrity became chairman of the organisation. He did not support the founding of Fianna Fáil in 1926 and opposed the party's entry into the Dáil in 1927. Even after the Irish Civil war, McGarrity still supported the idea that a 32 county Irish Republic could be achieved through force. in the spring of 1926, he received IRA Chief of Staff Andy Cooney to America. Cooney and Clan na Gael formally agreed that each organisation would support each other and that Clan na Gael would raise funds, purchase weapons and build support for the IRA in America.

Going into the late 1920s though Clan na Gael, as most Irish-American organisation were, was struggling. Having limped past the split caused by the Irish Civil War, the rejection of Fianna Fáil had caused a second split in the membership. Many Irish-Americans saw the IRA and Fianna Fáil as one and the same at that point and Clan na Gael and McGarrity's hostility to them caused much friction.

By July 1929, the Clan's membership in one of its strongholds, New York City, was down to just 620 paid members. Then in October that same year Wall Street Crashed and the Great Depression hit. In 1933 McGarrity was left almost bankrupt after he was found guilty of "false bookkeeping entries". McGarrity's livelihood was saved when he became one of the main ticket agents in the US for the Irish Hospitals' Sweepstake. He was a personal friend of Joe McGrath, one of the founders of the Sweepstake. The sweepstakes allowed McGarrity to turn his fortunes back around.

Despite the trying times of both Clan na Gael and his personal life, McGarrity held fast in his belief in physical force Irish Republicanism. In 1939 supported the demand from Seán Russell for the "S-Plan" bombing campaign in Britain, which proved disastrous. McGarrity is alleged to have met Hermann Göring in Berlin in 1939 to ask for aid for the IRA, which led indirectly to "Plan Kathleen".

He was a lifelong friend of fellow Carrickmore native and avid Republican, Patrick McCartan. When he died in 1940 a mass was held in the St Mary's Pro-Cathedral in Dublin. McGarrity remained an unrepentant physical force republican all his life.

A number of his papers are in the National Library of Ireland. He donated his personal Library to Villanova University.

The IRA signed all its statements 'J.J. McGarrity' up until 1969 when the organisation split into the 'Official' and 'Provisional' movements. Thereafter the term continued to be used by the Officials while the Provisionals adopted the moniker 'P. O'Neill'

== Sources ==
- De Valera: Long Fellow, Long Shadow, Tim Pat Coogan (1993)
- Memoirs of Senator Joseph Connolly: A Founder of Modern Ireland, J. Anthony Gaughan (ed), 1996.
