= Fine Gaedheal =

Fine Gaedheal may refer to

- Fine Gael, Irish political party founded in 1932
- Fine Ghaedheal, organiser of the Irish Race Convention 1922
