= Tracton =

Civil parish in County Cork, Ireland

Coordinates: 51.7615°N 8.3915°W

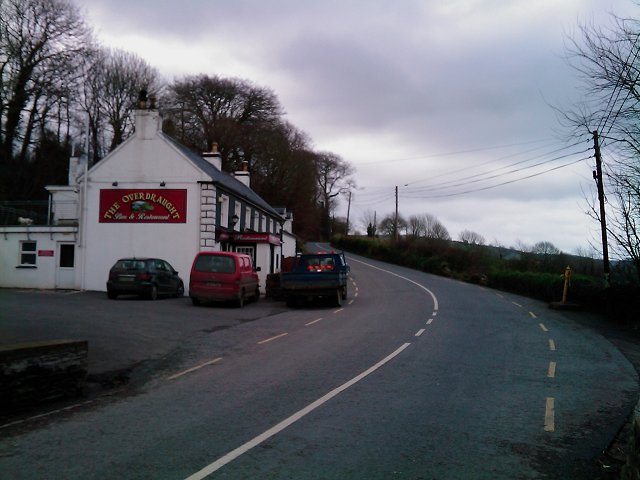
Pub (The Overdraught) near Tracton Wood

Tracton (Irish: Trácht Fhionn) is a civil parish in southeast County Cork in Ireland. Lying roughly 7 kilometres south of Carrigaline, it lies within the Dáil constituency of Cork South-Central. The area is named after Tracton Abbey, a Cistercian monastery that was in the area in medieval times.

Tracton GAA club, based close to the village of Minane Bridge, won the Cork Intermediate Hurling Championship in 1991.

Irish Republican Diarmuid Lynch was born in Tracton.
