= 1884 London Bridge attack =

Coordinates: 51°30′26.84″N 0°5′17.26″W

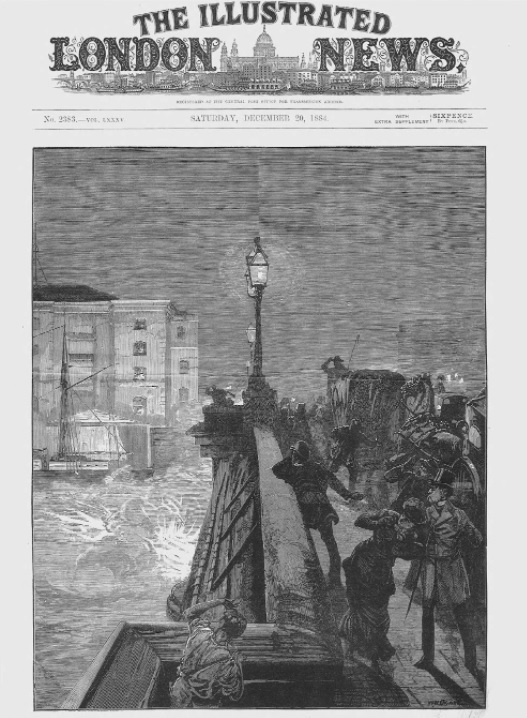
Illustration by W. H. Overend, Illustrated London News, 20 December 1884

On Saturday 13 December 1884 two American-Irish Republicans carried out a dynamite attack on London Bridge as part of the Fenian dynamite campaign. The bomb went off prematurely while the men were in a boat attaching it to a bridge pier at 5.45 pm during the evening rush hour. There was little damage to the bridge, and no casualties other than the bombers, who died instantly. However, there was considerable collateral damage and "hundreds of windows were shattered" on both banks of the Thames. The men's boat was so completely destroyed the police initially thought the bombers had fled.

The front-page of the Illustrated London News on 20 December 1884 featured a full-page illustration depicting the flash of the explosion from under the bridge as seen by witnesses. On 25 December the discovery was made of the mutilated remains of one of the bombers. The body of the other man was never recovered, but the police were later able to identify the dead men as two Americans, William Mackey Lomasney and John Fleming. The men were identified after a landlord reported to police that dynamite had been found in the rented premises of two American gentlemen who had disappeared after 13 December, enabling police to piece together who was responsible for the attack. The men had already been under surveillance by the police in America and in Britain. While most accounts claim that there were three men killed, a Fenian History website reports only two deaths.
