= Tracton Abbey =

Medieval Cistercian friary in Cork, Ireland

- Mainistir Thráicht Fhionn
- Interactive map of Tracton Abbey

Monastery information
- Order: Cistercian

Tracton Abbey (Irish: Mainistir Thráicht Fhionn), was a medieval Cistercian friary located in Tracton, County Cork, Ireland. No traces of the abbey remain today.

== History ==
Tracton Abbey was founded in 1225. By 1639 the abbey had fallen into disrepair, and by the time of the building of the church which currently occupies the grounds of the abbey, there were likely no remains standing.

The site once occupied by the abbey is now occupied by an Anglican church and by farm buildings.

== Historical artefacts ==
In 1680, a chalice was presented to the abbey, though it is likely 25 to 30 years older. It bears the inscription: "The gift of Mrs. Jane Daunt, widow. September 10th, 1680. Tracton Abbey Church." It is marked with the initials WTF and JH, JH being for John Hawkins, who made the chalice. It is emblazoned with a coat of arms bearing argent, featuring a chevron azure between three birds, similar to the crest of Lewis Watson, 1st Baron Rockingham.

One of only ten sheela na gigs known to originate in Cork is associated with Tracton Abbey. On show in the Cork Public Museum, it was found in a garden on the site of the former abbey.

In the early 19th century, an Iron Age horse bit was unearthed at the abbey, though the exact find place is unknown. Suspected to date from circa. 200 BC, the bit is now in the holding of the National Museum of Scotland.
