= Daniel F. Cohalan =

American judge

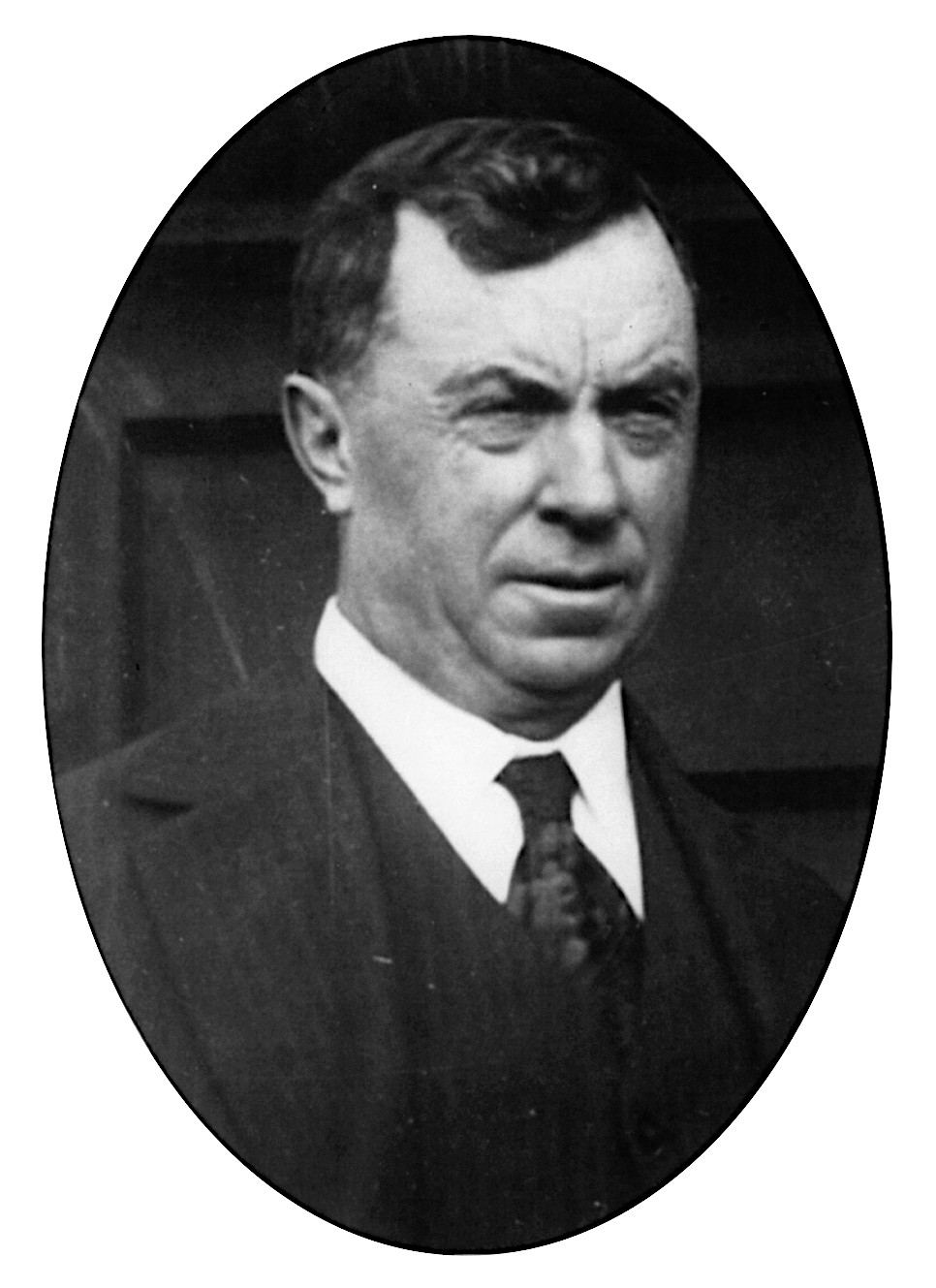
Daniel F. Cohalan in 1923

Daniel Florence Cohalan (December 21, 1865 – November 12, 1946) was an American lawyer and politician of Irish descent.

== Life ==
Cohalan was born in Middletown, Orange County, New York. He was the son of Timothy E. Cohalan and Ellen (O'Leary) Cohalan. He graduated from Manhattan College in 1885. Then he studied law, was admitted to the bar in 1888, and practiced in Orange County. In September 1889, he removed to the Bronx, practiced law there, and entered politics, joining Tammany Hall. He was Grand Sachem of the Tammany Society from 1908 to 1911.

On May 18, 1911, he was appointed by Gov. John Alden Dix to the New York Supreme Court, to fill the vacancy caused by the election of James Aloysius O'Gorman as U.S. Senator from New York. In November 1911, Cohalan was elected to succeed himself. On December 28, 1923, he tendered his resignation, to become effective on January 12, 1924, claiming that the annual salary of $17,500 was not enough to provide for his large family.

He was a close associate of Irish revolutionary leader John Devoy and was influential in many Irish-American societies including Clan na Gael. Cohalan was involved with the financing and planning of the Easter Rising in Dublin and was instrumental in sending Roger Casement to Germany in 1914. He was Chairman of the Irish Race Convention held in Philadelphia (22–23 February 1919) and active in the Friends of Irish Freedom (1916–1934).

Cohalan strongly opposed President Woodrow Wilson's proposals for the League of Nations, on the basis that the Irish Republic had been denied a policy of self-determination at the Paris Peace Conference in 1919. Cohalan broke with both Éamon de Valera and Irish-American leader Joseph McGarrity in late 1919 on Irish-American political direction.

He died at his New York City home on November 12, 1946, and was buried at the Calvary Cemetery in Queens.

State Senator John P. Cohalan was one of his eleven siblings, and church historian Monsignor Florence Daniel Cohalan was one of his nine children.
