= Irish Race Conventions =

Disconnected series of conventions held by Irish nationalists

The Irish Race Conventions were a disconnected series of conventions held by Irish nationalists. The majority were held in the United States and supported by Irish-American organisations, but others were held in Australia, Argentina, and France. Most related to the Irish Home Rule movement, but the two most recent conventions – in 1947 and 1994 – dealt with issues relating to Northern Ireland.

== Places and dates ==
- 1881 Chicago
- 1896 Dublin
- 1916 New York City
- 1918 New York City
- 1919 Philadelphia
- 1921 Buenos Aires
- 1922 Paris
- 1947 New York City
- 1994 New York City

== The conventions' agendas ==
=== Chicago 1881 ===
In 1880, Charles Stewart Parnell had visited Chicago and the American branch of the Irish National Land League was established there. The first Irish Race Convention was held on 30 November – 2 December 1881, following a Clan na Gael convention in August. It covered the recent emerging links between the more violent groups, such as the Fenians, the Land League and the growing Irish Home Rule movement that was led by Parnell. Organized by John F. Finerty, and attended by Home Rule MPs T. P. O'Connor and Tim Healy, the convention's Home Rule Fund had soon raised $500,000.

=== Philadelphia 1883 ===
John Finerty listed a convention at Philadelphia, where the main business was establishing local branches of the American branch of the Irish National League. Alexander Sullivan of Chicago was elected President, and Finerty was elected that year for the predominantly Irish Illinois's 2nd congressional district.

=== Dublin 1896 ===
By 1896, two Home Rule Bills had been defeated in the London parliament, and the Home Rule movement had split over its support for Parnell. A Conservative and Liberal Unionist coalition was in power, both being firmly opposed to Home Rule. The main purpose of the convention was to try to re-unite the Redmond and Dillon factions that had divided the Irish Parliamentary Party in 1890.

Archbishop Walsh of Toronto had said: "Let a great National Convention be held in Dublin, composed of chosen representatives of the clergy and people of Ireland and of an advisory representation of the Irish race abroad." John Dillon on behalf of the INF replied: "That this party approves of the suggestion made by the Archbishop of Toronto in favour of a National Convention representative of the Irish race throughout the world."

Pope Leo XIII sent a blessing in Latin: "Sanctissimus, bonum spirituale et temporale Hibernorum exoptans, finem dissensionum precatur". The convention thanked him profusely: "The Irish Race Convention begs to express its profound gratitude to the Holy Father (i.e., the Pope) for his most kind and salutary message, which all the delegates receive as a signal favour, and as the happiest augury of peace."

A number of practical resolutions followed, primarily on the progress of land ownership reform. Eventually the Irish Parliamentary Party did reunite in 1900, chaired by Redmond, and achieved the enactment of the Home Rule Act 1914, but this was suspended for the duration of the First World War.

=== New York City 1916 ===
The Chairman of the 1916 convention was John W. Goff. Comprising 2,300 delegates at the Hotel Astor, was held six weeks before the Easter Rising, and considered the division between the Home Rule parties and the more militant nationalists. The Rising would be supported by Clan na Gael, but other members remained hopeful that the 1914 Home Rule Act, which had been passed but suspended during World War I, might work.

A majority at the convention supported the American policy of neutrality during the war, and were opposed to any alliance with Britain. Woodrow Wilson won the 1916 United States presidential election with help from Irish-Americans and his campaign slogan: "He kept us out of War".

An important result was the formation of the "Friends of Irish Freedom" that worked as a co-ordinating body to support: "... the independence of Ireland, the industrial development of Ireland, the use and sale of Irish products, and to revive Irish culture."

=== New York City 1918 ===
Held on 18–19 May, and organised by the Friends for Irish Freedom, this convention looked forward to the end of the world war, in which America was now an ally of Britain. The convention therefore had the difficult task of steering between its support for militant groups such as Sinn Féin, which was opposed to British rule in Ireland, and proclaiming the loyalty of Irish-Americans to the USA. America had enacted conscription in 1917, but the Irish Conscription Crisis of 1918 had recently arisen, unifying most nationalist parties in Ireland.

In America, the Hindu German Conspiracy Trial had just ended, revealing the link between Clan na Gael and the defendants. Public relations and selecting the convention chairman were therefore unusually important. This also caused an immediate division between John Devoy, who proposed the moderate Father Hurton, being mindful of the "hostile press", and Hanna Sheehy-Skeffington and Jim Larkin who proposed the more combative John Forrest Kelly. The convention ended with an address by Judge Goff to President Wilson, which was considered to be mild and conciliatory: "to take such measures as are best calculated to bring about the independence of Ireland".

=== Philadelphia 1919 ===
Joseph McGarrity helped organize this convention which was held on 22–23 February, with over 5,000 delegates. The convention discussed the success of Sinn Féin in the 1918 general election, the declaration in January of the Irish Republic in Dublin, and the hope that America would support Irish participation at the forthcoming Paris peace conference. The principle of self-determination at article 5 in Wilson's Fourteen Points was expected to apply to Ireland. Much mention was made of the bravery of the "Fighting 69th" in the war. The hero of the hour was the American-born Irish republican leader Éamon de Valera.

The convention appointed the American Commission on Irish Independence to go to Europe to lobby and secure a hearing at the peace conference for Irelands case for independence; its members were Frank P. Walsh, Edward Fitzsimmons Dunne, and Michael J. Ryan. In the event, Irish participation at Paris was excluded, Woodrow Wilson refused his support, and in retaliation Irish pressure groups refused to vote as usual for the Democratic Party in the 1920 United States presidential election, partially causing Harding's victory.

A fund-raising drive by the Friends of Irish Freedom (FOIF) to sell bonds issued by the Irish Republic eventually raised over $5m., but disputes arose over the management of the money. The FOIF was led by John Devoy and Judge Cohalan (a judge of the New York Supreme Court), and believed that a sophisticated and conciliatory approach would ensure the best diplomatic support for Ireland at the Paris conference. De Valera and other Irish delegates expected the FOIF to demand and secure immediate recognition by the USA of the Irish Republic. A division on policy arose, Sinn Féin tried unsuccessfully to reform the FOIF and severed mutual links in October 1920.

In turn, the FOIF President Bishop Gallagher called de Valera a "foreign potentate", and Bishop Turner referred to him as the "Pancho Villa of Ireland". Membership of the FOIF soon declined from over 100,000 to less than 20,000.

=== Melbourne 1919 ===
Held on 3 November 1919, this first Australian convention was chaired by Thomas Ryan KC, the Labor party Premier of Queensland. Archbishop Mannix read out messages he had exchanged with Arthur Griffith, and supported the Irish claim to sovereignty. Archbishop Redwood of New Zealand also attended. Monsignor Curran estimated that 1,000 delegates were present, and that the Irish "block vote" was then about 23% of the electorate.

=== Buenos Aires 1921 ===
In 1921, Laurence Ginnell was sent to organise a smaller convention in Buenos Aires, Argentina. The effect was to link up with the expatriate Irish there, and to demonstrate the world-wide scope of the nationalist movement.

=== Paris 1922 ===
In January 1922, the convention had to consider the Anglo-Irish Treaty that had just been ratified and which divided nationalist opinion. It was held in Paris to emphasise Ireland's emerging status as an independent state to the rest of Europe. The proposed Irish Free State was to be created in December 1922. The convention was organised by Art O'Brien, the Irish Self-Determination League and Fine Ghaedheal (Irish for 'Family of the Gael') which was to be made permanent and to be funded by the formative Irish government.

The Irish delegation was supposed to represent "the Irish people", but this comprised senior members of Sinn Féin who were for and against the treaty. Debate on the treaty turned on the definition of whether or not the treaty embodied Ireland's "full" right to independence. Those against the treaty said not; those in favour said it was a significant step towards full independence.

The Chair, Rev. Dr. O'Reilly was perplexed: "... at first he had not been able to understand how the word 'full' could be political, but he had now been enlightened by the speeches of Mr. de Valera's supporters." The Very Rev. T. J. Shanley said that Americans would still continue to help Ireland, and that: "... I am going back to America for one purpose and one alone, to go on the public platform to ask for money – and I'm going to get it – for guns and munitions to send to the men in Ireland who are prepared to carry out that fight for Ireland's absolute independence (Applause)."

The outcome was a rare moral victory for de Valera's anti-treaty followers; the seven-men executive committee had four of his nominees, while the pro-treaty side only had one of its candidates elected, Eoin MacNeill.

MacNeill deplored that: "... the undertaking obtained from Mr. de Valera that party politics should not be introduced into the Congress, and that its funds and machinery would not be applied to party purposes has already been violated in one important particular, and that the undertaking in which Mr. de Valera and his nominees went to Paris as part of the official Irish Delegation was violated by them."

In March 1922, de Valera proposed that the Second Dáil provide a £5,000 loan to Fine Ghaedheal. A Dáil special committee considered the matter and reported in June, recommending a loan. The Dáil voted to accept the report without the loan.

=== New York City 1947 ===
By this stage the Irish Free State was effectively a republic, and had remained neutral in World War II. The main issue in 1947 was to end the partition of Ireland.

America was supporting Britain through the Marshall Aid plan, and the solution was to make this aid conditional upon the end of partition. Congressman John E. Fogarty was the main mover. On 29 March 1950, he proposed the Fogarty Resolution as a part of the Marshall Plan Foreign Aid Bill, arguing that Northern Ireland was costing Britain $150,000,000 annually, and that American financial support for Britain was thereby prolonging the partition of Ireland. On 27 September 1951, Fogarty's resolution was defeated in Congress by 206 votes to 139, with 83 abstaining – a factor that swung some votes against his motion was that Ireland had remained neutral during World War II.

=== New York City 1994 ===
The Irish Race Convention that was held at the Jacob Javits Center in New York on June 11, 1994 with Sinn Fein leader Gerry Adams as guest speaker. This convention was initially conceived by Gerry McGeough, an Irish Republican from Co Tyrone.

McGeough, who had been extradited from Germany to the United States in May 1992 on charges from 1982 relating to the procurement of weapons for use by the IRA against the British in the North of Ireland. He was released on bail within weeks of his arrival in the US and immediately set about speaking and organizing on behalf of the Irish Republican cause among Irish-Americans. He joined the Ancient Order of Hibernians (AOH) at this time and worked closely on Irish and Catholic issues with many of its prominent members, including Vic Sackett from Long Island.

The plans for an Irish Race Convention in the tradition of those that had taken place over the previous generations, began to fully crystalize in the summer of 1993 and an umbrella group, the Irish American Movement (IAM) was formed. The IAM’s primary role was to facilitate meetings involving a wide spectrum of Irish-American organizations and to plan and fundraise for the Convention itself. On September 15 of that year, McGeough and New York-based Catholic activist Kathleen O’Callaghan arranged for a special Mass to be said in St Patrick’s Cathedral in Manhattan for the intentions of Irish Unity. More than 2,000 people packed into the cathedral for the occasion, which was seen as a preliminary move ahead of the actual Convention and the huge turnout indicative of the growing interest in the event.

Over the coming months, the IAM continued to organize and prepare a program of events for the Convention. Delegates from numerous countries with significant Irish populations, including Argentina and Australia were invited to participate. The IAM drew up a resolution, which was to be passed at the Convention, fixed for June 11, 1994. The wording of the resolution was as follows: "We, the children of the Irish Diaspora, demand that Britain set a date for withdrawal from our ancestral homeland so that Ireland may exercise its right to be a sovereign and independent nation." The intention of the resolution was that once passed it would be presented as a joint aspiration of all Irish-American organizations under the auspices of the IAM to political candidates in U.S. elections for their endorsement in exchange for political support. Several prominent American Congressmen from both the Republican and Democratic parties pledged to attend the Convention.

On Easter Monday, April 4, 1994, Gerry McGeough began a three year prison sentence for the earlier weapons charges and was no longer directly involved in the preparations for the Convention. By this time, however, a strong committee had been formed, which, under the guidance of Vic Sackett brought the Convention to fruition. In recognition of the event, New York City designated June 11 as Irish Race Convention Day.
