= Minane Bridge =

Village in County Cork, Ireland

Minane Bridge Droichead an Mhionnáin
- Village
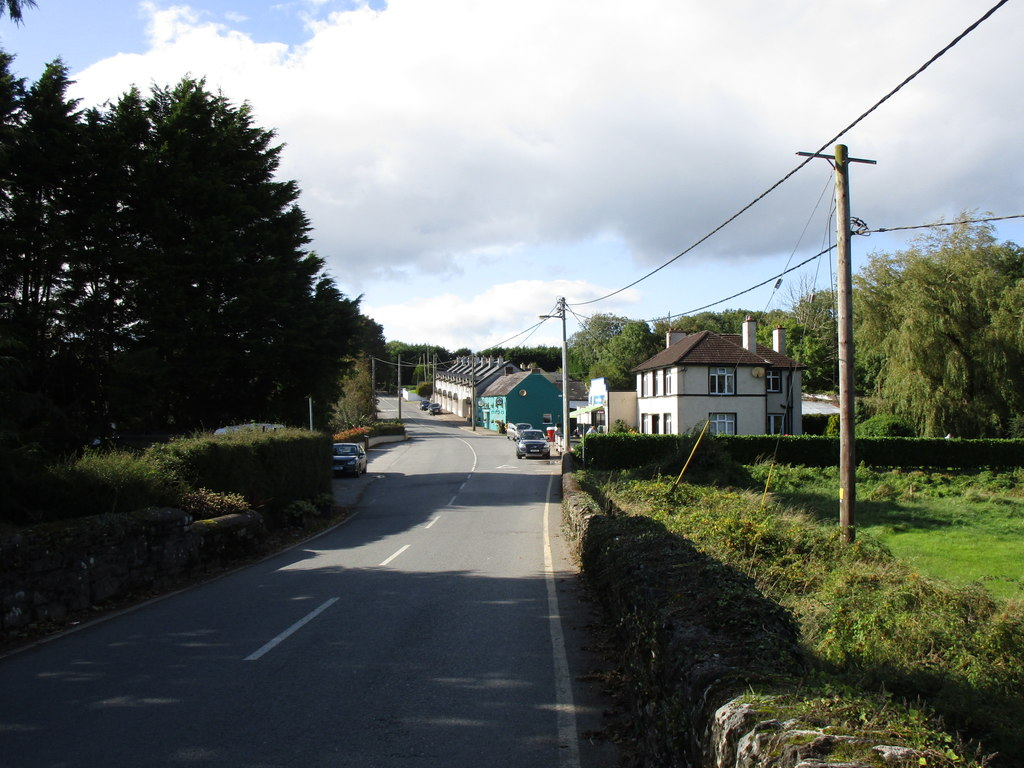
- The main street in Minane Bridge

- Location in Ireland
- Coordinates: 51°45′46″N 08°22′27″W
- Country: Ireland
- Province: Munster
- County: County Cork
- Time zone: UTC+0 (WET)
  - Summer (DST): UTC-1 (IST (WEST))

Minane Bridge (Irish: Droichead an Mhionnáin) is a village in County Cork, Ireland. It is in the townland of Minane, 20 km south of Cork city and 5 km south of Carrigaline. The local church is Sacred Heart Church of Tracton Abbey Parish. Minane Bridge is part of the Dáil constituency of Cork South-Central.

== History ==
Minane Bridge is home to the second oldest Roman Catholic Church in the diocese of Cork and Ross. Built in 1755, it was restored in 1836. Also located nearby is the monastery at Tracton Abbey, which was originally founded in 1224.

Tracton parish is the ancestral home of 1916 Easter Rising volunteer Diarmuid Lynch, who is buried in the graveyard of Tracton Abbey.

== Sport ==
Minane Bridge is home to Tracton GAA club and Tracton Athletic Club. The "Tour de South Coast", a charity cycle, is organised locally.

== See also ==
- List of towns and villages in Ireland
