= Fenian dynamite campaign =

Bombing campaign by Irish republicans from 1881 to 1885

- Part of Irish republicanism
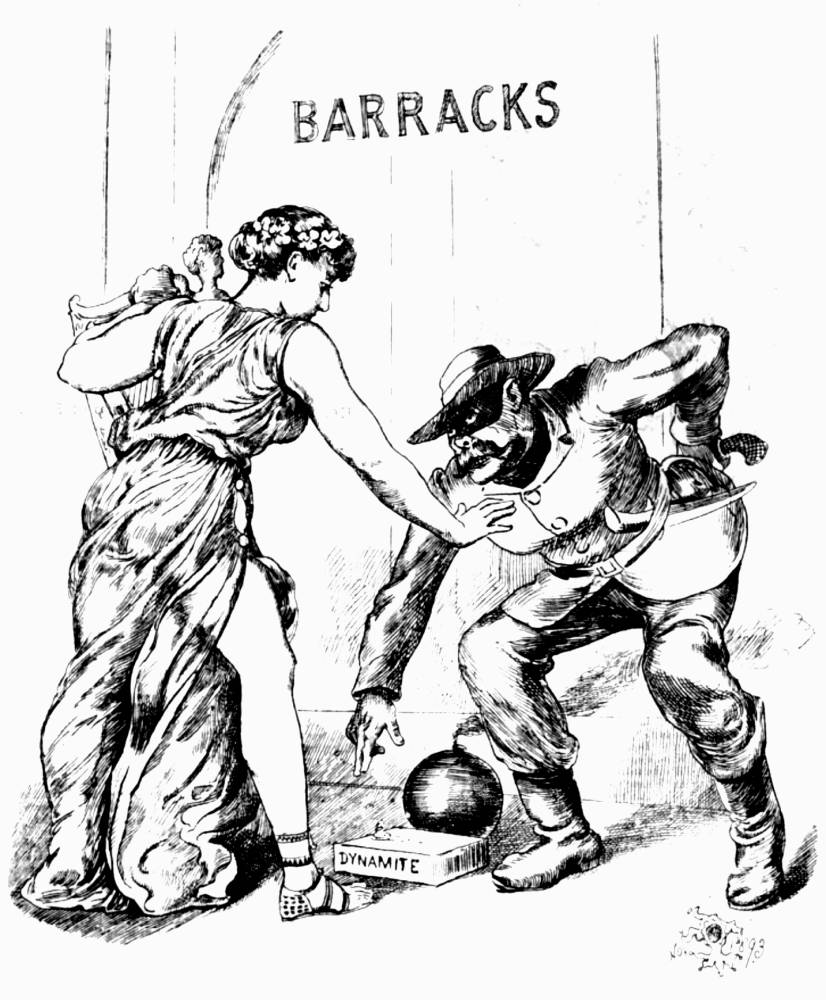
- An 1893 political cartoon depicting Erin telling an Irish republican to stop the campaign
- Type: Political violence
- Location: Great Britain
- Planned by: Jeremiah O'Donovan Rossa; Alexander Martin Sullivan
- Target: Government and civilian targets
- Objective: The end of British rule in Ireland
- Date: 14 January 1881 – 10 February 1885
- Executed by: Irish Republican Brotherhood; United Irishmen of America; Clan na Gael
- Outcome: Failure
- Casualties: 4 killed 86 injured

The Fenian dynamite campaign (also known as the Fenian bombing campaign) was a campaign of political violence orchestrated by Fenians, Irish republican paramilitary groups in Great Britain from 1881 to 1885. It involved attacks using explosives such as dynamite on British government and civilian targets and was carried out by the Irish Republican Brotherhood, United Irishmen of America and Clan na Gael with the ultimate aim of ending British rule in Ireland. Infrastructure was attacked along with government (including military and police) targets as part of the campaign, which killed 4 people, including a young boy, and wounded 86. The campaign met with widespread backlash in Britain and a mixed response in Ireland, and led to the establishment of the Special Irish Branch by the Metropolitan Police to counter the campaign. By 1885, the campaign petered out, though Irish republicans would continue to carry out attacks in Great Britain well into the 20th century.

== Timeline of the campaign ==
=== 1881 ===
- 14 Jan 1881: A bomb exploded at a military barracks in Salford, Lancashire. A young boy was killed
- 16 Mar 1881: A bomb was found and defused in the Mansion House, London.
- 5 May 1881: Bomb explodes at Chester Barracks, Chester.
- 16 May 1881: Bomb attack at Liverpool police barracks.
- 10 June 1881: Bomb planted at Liverpool Town Hall,
- 30 June 1881: Disguised explosives found aboard SS Malta at Liverpool.
- 2 July 1881: Disguised explosives found aboard SS Bavaria in Liverpool.

=== 1882 ===
- 12 May 1882: A bomb exploded at the Mansion House, London.

=== 1883 ===
- 20 January 1883: In Glasgow, bombs exploded at Tradeston Gasworks, Possil Road Bridge and Buchanan Street Station. About a dozen people were injured.
- 15 Mar 1883: In London, bombs exploded at government buildings at Whitehall and at the offices of The Times newspaper. There were no injuries.
- 29 March 1883: Fenians Denis Deasy, Timothy Featherstone and Patsy Flanagan are arrested while police in County Cork raid the homes and businesses of associates of Deasy and Flanagan.
- 28 May 1883: Future Easter Rising leader Tom Clarke is sentenced to penal servitude for life.
- 11 June 1883: Gallagher Trials begin.
- 22 August 1883: Fenian 'Red' Jim McDermott arrested.
- 31 August 1883: Those responsible for Glasgow bombings in January were arrested.
- 30 Oct 1883: Two bombs exploded in the London Underground, at Paddington (Praed Street) station (injuring 70 people) and Westminster Bridge station.
- December 1883: Trial of Glasgow bombers.

=== 1884 ===
- 26 Feb 1884: A bomb exploded in the left-luggage room of Victoria station, London. The building was empty at the time and no-one was injured. Other bombs were defused at Charing Cross station, Ludgate Hill station and Paddington station.
- 11 April 1884: John Daly arrested with explosives at Birkenhead.
- 30 May 1884: Three bombs exploded in London: at the headquarters of the Metropolitan Police's Criminal Investigation Department (CID) and Special Irish Branch in Scotland Yard, in the basement of the Carlton Club (a gentlemen's club for members of the Conservative Party) and outside the home of Conservative MP Sir Watkin Williams-Wynn. Ten people were injured. A fourth bomb was planted at the foot of Nelson's Column but failed to explode.
- 30 July 1884: John Daly, James Egan and William O'Donnell tried at Warwick Assizes under charges of treason.
- 13 Dec 1884: Two American-Irish Republicans, who were planting a bomb on London Bridge, were killed when their bomb prematurely exploded. One of the men was William Mackey Lomasney.

=== 1885 ===
- 2 Jan 1885: A bomb exploded at Gower Street station, London.
- 24 Jan 1885: Three bombs exploded in London, in the House of Commons chamber, in Westminster Hall and in the Banqueting Room of the Tower of London. Four passers-by were injured, as were PCs Thomas Cox and William Cole, who were both awarded the Albert Medal for attempting to get the Westminster Hall device out of the building. Henry or Harry Burton and James Gilbert Cunningham were sentenced to penal servitude for life as a result.
- 10 February 1885: Dynamite found on Harrow Road, London.

== See also ==
- List of Irish uprisings
- Fenian Rising
- Fenian raids
- Manchester Martyrs and Cuba Five
- S-Plan - a bombing campaign in England by the Irish Republican Army
- Physical force Irish republicanism
