= Friends of Irish Freedom =

Membership application card for the Friends of Irish Freedom for 1921. Dues were set at $2 for the year.

The Friends of Irish Freedom was an Irish-American nationalist organisation founded at the third Irish Race Convention held in New York (4–5 March 1916). Supported by the United Irish League, the Ancient Order of Hibernians and other leading Irish-American organisations. Clan na Gael dominated the Executive (holding 15 of the 17 seats).

The Organisation's aims were to 'encourage and assist any movement that will tend to bring about the National Independence of Ireland'. Among the first members of the Executive Committee were Victor Herbert (President), Thomas Hughes Kelly (Treasurer) and John D. Moore (Secretary). An office was set up in Sweden and relations established with Imperial Germany. The Friends of Irish Freedom supported the 1916 Rising and in the months following, raised $350,000 through the Irish Relief Fund to assist dependents of many who fought in the Rising.

In 1917, the Executive Committee of the Friends of Irish Freedom circulated a petition calling for the Independence of Ireland throughout the US and secured several hundred thousand signatures. President Wilson in turn directed Secret Service agents to examine the membership and funding of the organisation. In May 1918, the Friends of Irish Freedom organised the fourth Irish Race Convention during which Diarmuid Lynch became National Secretary holding the post until his return to Ireland in 1932. Another convention was held in Philadelphia in late February 1919 with over 5,000 in attendance. At that conference a resolution was passed calling on US President Wilson to bring Irelands call for independence to the World War I Paris peace conference: "...place before the Peace Conference and support with all his powerful influence Ireland's right to self determination and...secure the same status and recognition which have been accorded to those of other small nations."

By 1920, there was a Regular membership of 100,000 and 484 Associate Branches with an Associate membership of 175,000. At the end of 1920 the Friends of Irish Freedom had collected almost $900,000. During the Irish War of Independence, the Friends of Irish Freedom raised over $5,000,000 in Dáil loans for the newly declared Irish Republic through the promotion of Bond Certificates. Legal advisor to the organisation for the Bond Drive was Franklin Delano Roosevelt. In October 1920, a rift developed between the Irish American leaders and Éamon de Valera which resulted in a split between the Friends of Irish Freedom in the United States and the Irish Republican Brotherhood in Ireland. Prior to his departure from the US, de Valera founded a rival organisation—the American Association for the Recognition of the Irish Republic—to take over the activities of the Friends.

The Friends of Irish Freedom was wound up in 1932 following extensive litigation concerning the funds raised for the Irish Republic which were claimed by de Valera, most of the funds were returned to the original donors.

== Publications ==
- Brine, Blanche Marie, Sinn Fein: An Epitome. Pamphlet no. 16. Washington, DC: Friends of Irish Freedom, National Bureau of Information, June 1920.
- Cobb, Irvin S., The Lost Irish Tribes in the South: Noted American Writer Delved into History and Found that Dixie wasn't as Anglo-Saxon as It Thought. Friends of Irish Freedom, National Bureau of Information, n.d. (c. 1920).
- Hickey, D. J. & J.E.Doherty. A Dictionary of Irish History. Gill & MacMillan. Ireland 1980. p. 181.
- Tansill, Charles Callan. America and the Fight for Irish Freedom. Devin Adair Co. NY. 1957. pp. 189, 228, 233-234, 415-416.
- Wright McCormick, Irish Republican Arbitration Courts: Their Work in Combating Land and Emigration Evils. Pamphlet no. 17. Washington, DC: Friends of Irish Freedom, National Bureau of Information, June 1920.
