= Clan na Gael =

Irish republican organization

- Founded: 20 June 1867; 159 years ago
- Preceded by: Fenian Brotherhood
- Newspaper: The Gaelic American; The Irish Press
- Ideology: Irish nationalism; Irish republicanism
- Irish affiliate: Irish Republican Brotherhood; Irish Volunteers; Irish Republican Army; Anti-Treaty IRA; Provisional IRA

Clan na Gael (CnG) (Irish: Clann na nGael, pronounced [ˈklˠaːn̪ˠ n̪ˠə ˈŋeːlˠ]; "family of the Gaels") is an Irish republican organization, founded in the United States in the late 19th and 20th centuries, successor to the Fenian Brotherhood and a sister organization to the Irish Republican Brotherhood.

== Background ==
The flag of Irish Republican Brotherhood, the organisation Clan na Gael was directly tied to for many decades

As Irish immigration to the United States of America began to increase in the 18th century many Irish organizations were formed. One of the earliest was formed under the name of the Irish Charitable Society and was founded in Boston, Massachusetts in 1737. These new organizations went by varying names, most notably the Ancient and Most Benevolent Order of the Friendly Brothers of Saint Patrick, founded in New York in 1767, the Society of the Friendly Sons of Saint Patrick for the Relief of Emigrants in Philadelphia in 1771, and the Friendly Sons of Saint Patrick also formed in New York in 1784.

In the later part of the 1780s, a strong Irish patriot (rather than Catholic) character began to grow in these organizations and amongst recently arrived Irish immigrants. The usage of Celtic symbolism helped solidify this sense of nationalism and was most noticeably found in the use of the name "Hibernian." (Hibernia is the Latin name for Ireland.)

In 1858, the Irish Republican Brotherhood (IRB) had been founded in Dublin by James Stephens. The initial decision to create this organization came about after Stephens consulted, through special emissary Joseph Denieffe, with John O'Mahony and Michael Doheny, members of a precursor group called the Emmet Monument Association.

In response to the establishment of the IRB in Dublin, a sister organization was founded in New York City, the Fenian Brotherhood, led by O'Mahony. This arm of Fenian activity in America produced a surge in radicalism among groups of Irish immigrants, many of whom had recently emigrated from Ireland during and after the Great Hunger. In October, 1865, the Fenian Philadelphia Congress met and appointed the Irish Republican Government in the US. But in 1865, in Ireland, the IRB newspaper The Irish People had been raided by the police and the IRB leadership was imprisoned. Another abortive uprising would occur in 1867, but the British remained in control.

After the 1865 crackdown in Ireland, the American organization began to fracture over what to do next. Made up of veterans of the American Civil War, a Fenian army had been formed. While O'Mahony and his supporters wanted to remain focused on supporting rebellions in Ireland a competing faction, called the Roberts, or senate wing, wanted this Fenian Army to attack British bases in Canada. The resulting Fenian Raids strained US–British relations. The level of American support for the Fenian cause began to diminish as the Fenians were seen as a threat to stability in the region.

The Irish were still seen as a foreign people within the borders of the American state by anti-Catholic Americans such as members of the Know-Nothing Party; their existence within America was seen primarily as temporary camps of immigrants who planned to stay in America only as long as the British stayed in Ireland. Upon the British withdrawal from Irish soil, it was believed, the Irish immigrants would return to their native land. The Fenian Raids were seen as an astonishing example of immigrant activity in US history and Irish nationalism has itself become something of an exception among the American melting pot. Very few US immigrants concerned themselves with their mother country as did the Irish; in March 1868, 100,000 Fenian supporters held an anti-British demonstration in New York.

== Creation ==
After 1867, the Irish Republican Brotherhood headquarters in Manchester chose to support neither of the existing feuding factions, but instead promoted a renewed Irish republican organization in America, to be named Clan na Gael. According to John Devoy in 1924, Jerome J. Collins founded what was then called the Napper Tandy Club in New York on 20 June 1867 – Wolfe Tone's birthday. This club expanded into others and at one point at a picnic in 1870 was named the Clan na Gael by Sam Cavanagh. This was the same Cavanagh who killed the informer George Clark, who had exposed a Fenian pike-making operation in Dublin to the police.

Collins, who died in 1881 on the disastrous Jeannette expedition to the North Pole, was a science editor for the New York Herald, who had left England in 1866 when a plot he was involved in to free the Fenian prisoners at Pentonville Prison was uncovered by the police. Collins believed at the time of the founding in 1867 that the two feuding Fenians branches should patch things up.

== Catalpa rescue ==
After arriving in America in 1871 John Devoy indicated he joined the Clan na Gael early on and attempted several times at Clan conventions to get the Clan to adopt a plan to free the military prisoners held by the British in Fremantle Australia. In 1874 John Devoy, with some oratorical help from Thomas Francis Bourke, was elected chairman of the executive board of the Clan and was also chosen to execute the rescue of the prisoners. Bourke warned Devoy that there would be "kickers" and he would have to have a heavy hand to control the Clan na Gael and succeed in the project. John Devoy devoted all his time to this project and oversaw the purchase of the bark Catalpa and the outfitting of this ship as a whaler. The Clan hired American George S. Anthony as its ship captain along with a New Bedford-based whaling crew. John received considerable help in running the Clan from Dr. William Carroll who was elected Executive Board Chairman in 1875 and between them they controlled Clan activity until 1882. Carroll was of Ulster Protestant stock and brought in others to the Clan from the upper middle class such as Simon Barclay Conover, senator from Florida. Devoy's nemesis during the fund raising for the enterprise was John Goff, an aspiring Clan member who later became a New York Supreme Court Judge and who, perhaps, resented the influence of Bourke and Devoy in the Clan. Devoy did in fact take a strong hand and began tossing out Clan members for malfeasance in office and violation of Clan rules as is shown in "General Circular No. 2" dated 15 January 1875. The success of the rescue in 1876 resulted in the Clan na Gael replacing for all practical purposes the Fenian Brotherhood as the spokesman of Irish-American nationalism.

Under the leadership of John Devoy, Clan na Gael would eventually be successful in educating Americans about the movement.

== New Departure 1879 ==
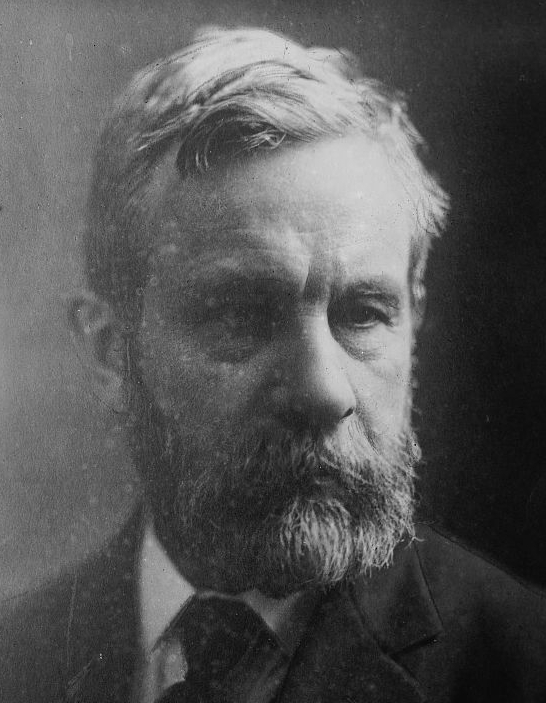
John Devoy became a key figure in Clan na Gael in the late 19th and early 20th Centuries

In 1879, Devoy promoted a "New Departure" in Irish republican thinking, by which the "physical force party" allied itself with the Irish Parliamentary Party under the political leadership of Charles Stewart Parnell, MP; the political plans of the Fenians were thus combined with the agrarian revolution inaugurated by the Irish National Land League. The arrangement was cemented at the first Irish Race Convention held in Chicago in 1881.

By 1880, more aggressive men within the Clan na Gael were chafing at the slow pace of Devoy and Carroll and these men were able to take control of the organization in 1882 when two "action men", Alexander Sullivan and Michael Boland, took over the reins and ran the clan as a dictatorship along with an inactive Mr. Feeley. The new leadership ignored the Revolutionary Council set up by Carroll to coordinate between the IRB and the Clan and began to operate in total secrecy from even the membership of the Clan. These three men called themselves the "Triangle" and began making bombing runs into England in what was called the "Dynamite War". This infuriated the IRB in Ireland which cut ties with the Irish-Americans. Michael Boland was later pointed out as a British spy which might have explained why the majority of the bombers were caught and jailed before they could strike.

The 1880s saw the solidification, at least within America, of Irish ideological orientations, with most nationalist sentiment finding its home within Clan na Gael, rather than organizations such as the Ancient Order of Hibernians. The more agrarian-minded found their ideological brethren within the Irish Federation of America. The third ideological strand was connected to the union and socialist movement and found support with the Knights of Labor. In the late 1880s a financial scandal in the Chicago branch of the Clan led to a successful conspiracy to murder whistle-blower Dr. Patrick Henry Cronin. John Devoy, who worked with Cronin, also began carrying a gun and expected to be assassinated by Alexander Sullivan's henchmen. The Cronin case, prosecuted by State's Attorney Joel Minnick Longenecker achieved international attention. Neither the prosecution nor the defense were concerned with the Clan's ties to the Fenians, trying the case simply as a conspiracy to commit murder. The Clan na Gael had split into pro and anti Sullivan/Boland branches, but was re-united by John Devoy around 1900.

In Ireland the Irish Parliamentary Party (IPP) achieved electoral success in the 1880s, and was supported by the British prime minister William Gladstone who introduced the unsuccessful Government of Ireland Bill 1886. Gladstone's party then divided over home rule, and the IPP also divided for a decade over Parnell's marriage to Mrs. O'Shea.

In 1891, a moderate offshoot of the Clan na Gael broke away and formed an organization under the name of Irish National Federation of America with T. Emmet as president. The federation supported the National Group in Ireland, a splinter group of Parnell's Home Rule Party. Rising to prominence within the Clan from the 1890s were Daniel Cohalan (later to be a judge of the New York Supreme Court) and Joseph McGarrity.

== In the 20th century ==
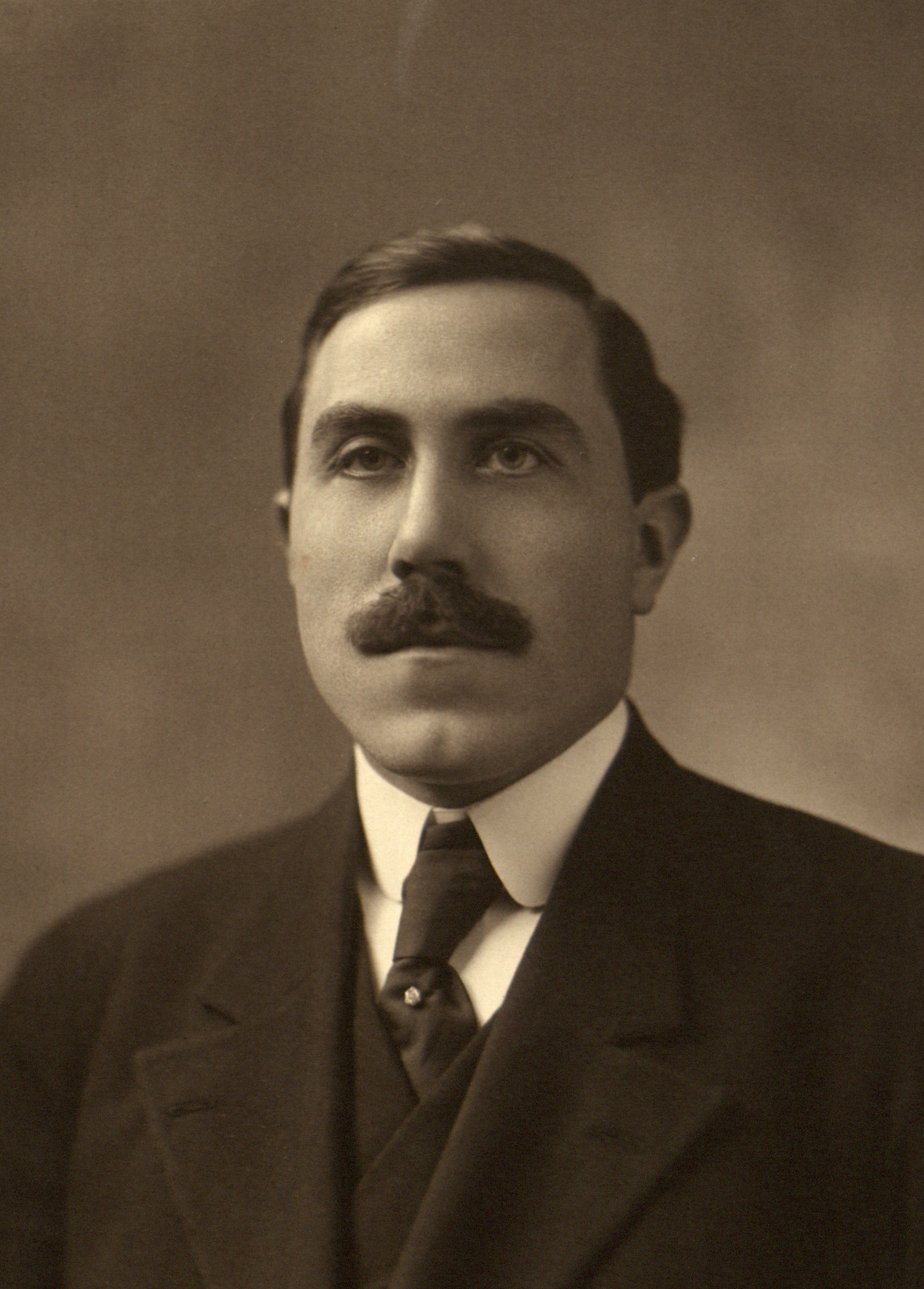
Joseph McGarrity became the leader of Clan na Gael following splits mirroring those in Ireland caused by the Irish Civil War

The objective of Clan na Gael was to secure an independent Ireland and to assist the Irish Republican Brotherhood in achieving this aim. To this end, the Clan was prepared to enter into alliances with any nation allied against the British; with the outbreak of the First World War in 1914, the Clan found its greatest ally in Imperial Germany. A delegation led by Devoy met with the German ambassador in the US Count Johann Heinrich von Bernstorff and his aide Franz von Papen in 1914. This was followed by an emissary John Kenny, sent on a mission to Berlin to discuss how the German war effort and Irish Nationalism could cooperate. Roger Casement wrote a petition to the Kaiser asking that freedom for Ireland be included in the declared war aims of the Central Powers. A controversial pro-German and Irish lecture was given in December 1914 to Clan na Gael on Long Island by the Celtologist Kuno Meyer. Devoy, along with Roger Casement and Joseph McGarrity, was able to bring together both Irish-American and German support in the years prior to the Easter Rising. However the German munitions never reached Ireland as the ship Aud carrying them was scuttled after being intercepted by the Royal Navy.

Clan na Gael became the largest single financier of both the Easter Rising and the Irish War of Independence. Imperial Germany aided Clan na Gael by selling those guns and munitions to be used in the uprising of 1916. Germany had hoped that by distracting Britain with an Irish uprising they would be able to garner the upper hand in the war and effect a German victory on the Western Front. However, they failed to follow through with more support. Clan na Gael was also involved via McGarrity and Casement in the abortive attempt to raise an "Irish Brigade" to fight against the British.

Some Sikhs held talks with Clan Na Gael, which led to authorities in Great Britain and India fearing Irish-Americans and Sikhs uniting against the British Empire. Clan Na Gael supported the primarily Sikh Ghadar Party, and played a supportive role in the Hindu German Conspiracy in the United States during World War I, which led to the Hindu German Conspiracy Trial in San Francisco in 1917–18.

Clan Na Gael largely controlled the Irish Race Conventions from 1916, and its affiliated group the Friends of Irish Freedom. The Irish War of Independence led to a split in Clan na Gael which was precipitated in June 1920 by Éamon de Valera, who as President of the Irish Republic became involved in a dispute with Devoy and Judge Cohalan over lobbying US presidential candidates on the issue of American recognition for the Irish Republic. To punish Woodrow Wilson for his apparent lack of support, the Clan backed Harding in the 1920 United States presidential election. In October, 1920, Harry Boland stated that the IRB in Ireland had terminated connections between the Clan and the parent body in Ireland until the will of Dáil Éireann was mirrored in Clan na Gael. Devoy and Cohalan refused to accept this but McGarrity disagreed, believing that without IRB support, the Clan was not legitimate, which led to a split. McGarrity, whose faction went by the name Reorganized Clan na Gael, supported the Anti-Treaty forces during the Civil War while Devoy and Cohalan supported the Free State. After 1924, when the IRB and the Devoy-Cohalan Clan na Gael both voted to disband, McGarrity's faction became the sole Clan na Gael. In 1926, the Clan na Gael formally associated with the reorganized Irish Republican Army in the same fashion as it had with the IRB.

McGarrity continued to provide support and aid to the IRA after it was outlawed in Ireland by de Valera in 1936 but became less active in the 1940s and 1950s following McGarrity's death in 1940. The organization grew in the 1970s and played a key part in NORAID, which was a prominent source of finance and weapons for the Provisional Irish Republican Army (PIRA) during the Troubles in Northern Ireland in 1969–1998. However, it provided only a tiny portion of the PIRA's total income and dried up because of the steep decline of sympathy among Irish Americans due to PIRA atrocities, and the investigation and prosecution by U.S. authorities of IRA supporters of gunrunning.

The Clan na Gael still exists today, much changed from the days of the Catalpa rescue and as recently as 1997 another internal split occurred as a result of the IRA shift away from using physical force as a result of the 1998 Good Friday peace accords.

== Presidents of the Clan na Gael ==
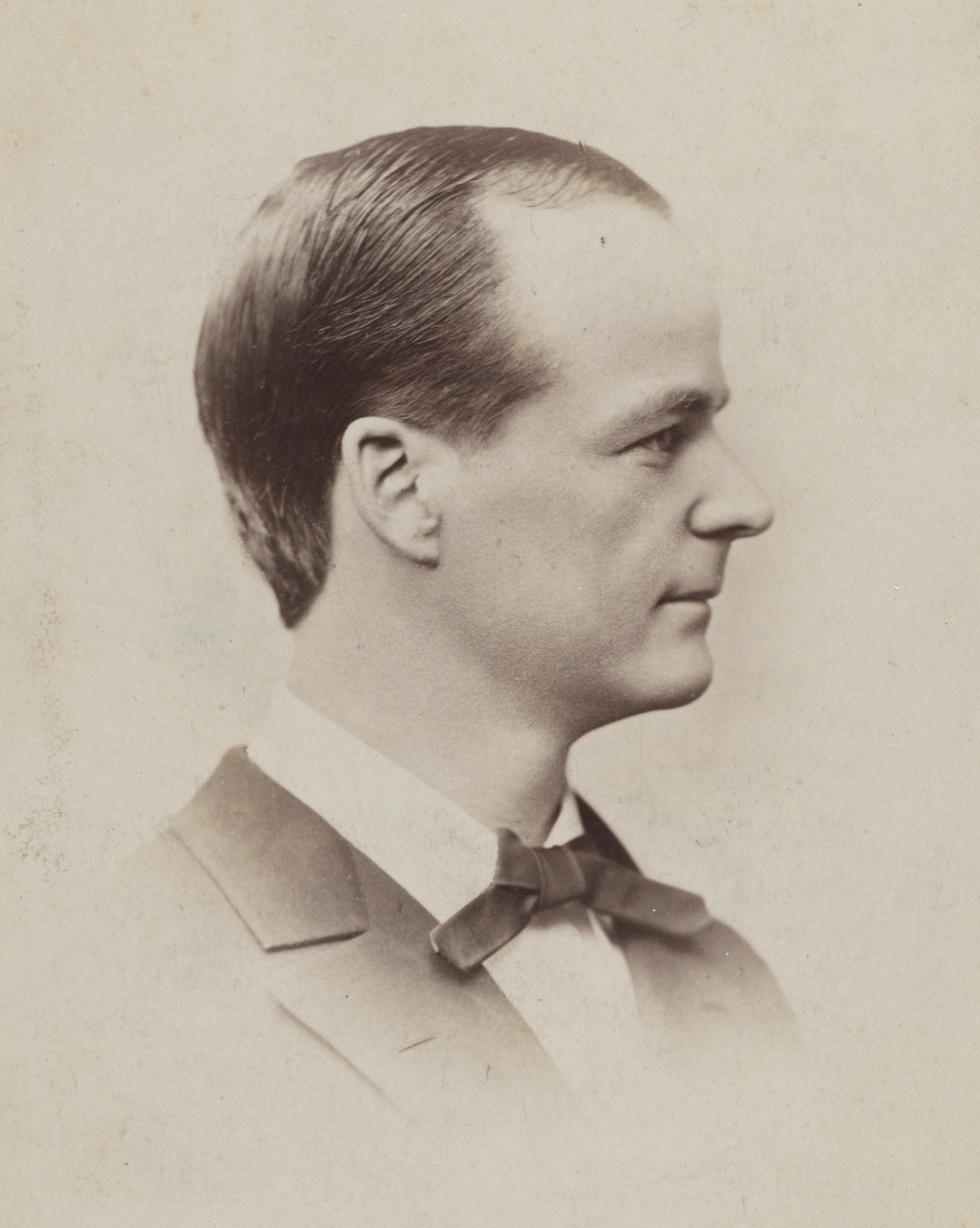
Alexander Sullivan, one of the Clan na Gael "triangle"

From its founding in 1869, although heavily influenced by founder John Devoy over the years, the organization was nominally under the control of an executive committee headed by a national Executive Board Chairman. This executive committee was elected at yearly, later ever other year, conventions. At the convention held in Chicago during 1881, the committee was reduced to five members making it easier to control. The committee then came under the domination of Michael Boland, D. S. Freely and national executive chairman Alexander Sullivan who together were known as "the Triangle".

The first chairman perhaps should be Jerome Collins as the man who founded the first Club (D1) of what would later be called the Clan na Gael (these clubs later were called "Camps"). The club was named Napper Tandy after an Irish patriot. From the beginning, according to John Devoy in the Gaelic American, the secretary of Napper Tandy and later of the Clan na Gael was William James Nicholson. He was secretary from 1867 to 1874 when he was dismissed for loaning Camp Funds which were not repaid. According to a descendant of the John Haltigan the foreman printer of the Irish People, James Haltigan son of John Haltigan was Executive Board Chairman in 1871.

In 1873 James Ryan was Executive Board Chairman. In 1874 John Devoy was chosen Executive Board Chairman at the Baltimore Convention. From 1875 until he resigned in 1879, John Devoy's trusted friend and ardent nationalist Dr. William Carroll of Philadelphia was Executive Board Chairman. James Reynolds of Connecticut temporarily held the post from Carroll's resignation until 1881 (there was no convention in 1880) when the Triangle of Sullivan, Feeley and Boland assumed command. Although Devoy supporters Reynolds and Treacy remained on the executive board, they were left out of the decision-making process by the Triangle. The Triangle's bombing campaign split the organization into two factions in the mid-1880s. After the murder of Cronin, the Clan na Gael united once again under John Devoy in 1900. John Kenny served as president of the Napper Tandy branch in 1883 and again in 1914.
