= Edward O'Meagher Condon =

Irish nationalist and Civil War (Union) officer

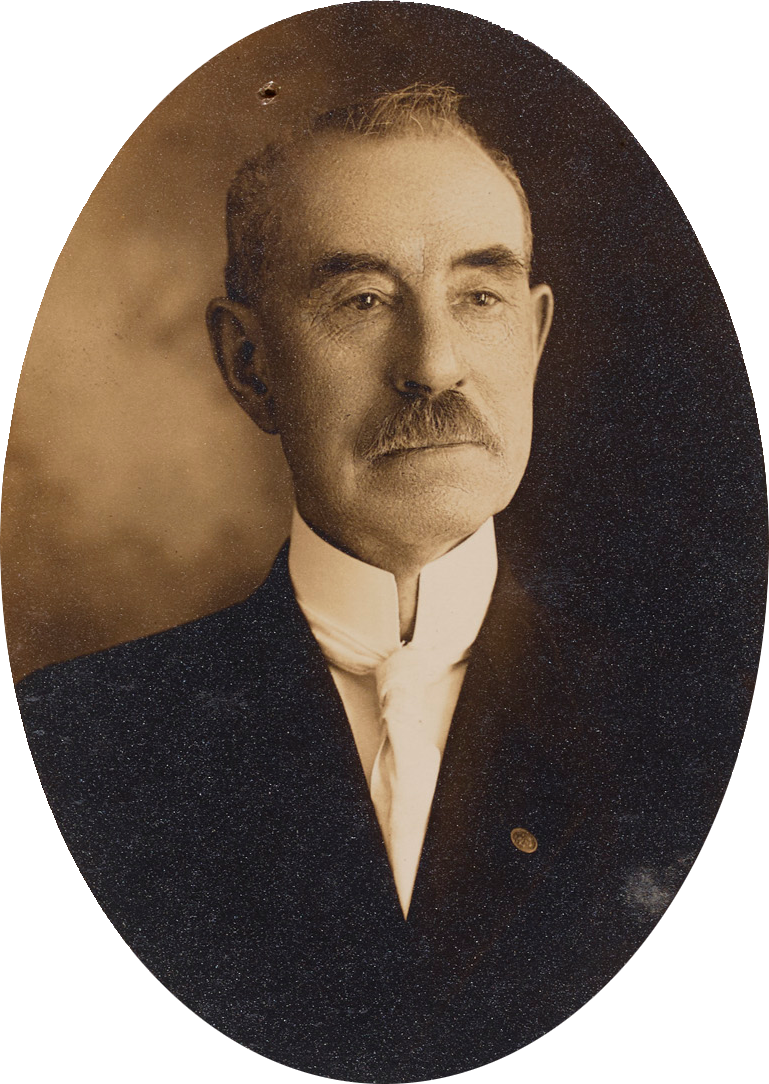

Personal details
- Born: Edward O'Meagher Condon; 27 January 1840 Mitchelstown, County Cork, Ireland
- Died: 15 December 1915 (aged 75) New York City, United States
- Citizenship: Irish; American

Military service
- Allegiance: Union Army
- Rank: Lieutenant
- Unit: 69th Infantry Regiment (New York)
- Battles/wars: American Civil War; Fenian Rising of 1867

Edward O'Meagher Condon (27 January 1840 – 15 December 1915) was an Irish nationalist and Fenian who fought in the American Civil War and attempted to participate in the Fenian Rising of 1867 in Ireland. After the Fenian Rising failed, In September 1867 O'Meagher Condon led a rescue party which attempted to save Irish Republican Brotherhood leader Thomas J. Kelly from imprisonment in Manchester, England. The rescue attempt led to the death of an English police officer and the arrest of sixty Irishmen, and led directly into the Manchester Martyrs case, in which O'Meagher Condon himself was one of the five main defendants. For his role in the attempted Manchester rescue, O'Meagher Condon was sentenced to death. During the trial, O'Meagher Condon gave a memorable speech in his own defence which ended with the rallying cry "God Save Ireland!", which was immediately repeated in unison by his fellow defendants. Not only did "God Save Ireland" become a popular slogan amongst Irish nationalists, but it was also turned into a song which became the "Unofficial Irish national anthem" until 1916, and continued to enjoy popularity long after.

O'Meagher Condon was an American citizen and his sentence was commuted to life imprisonment following an intervention from the American ambassador to Britain Charles Francis Adams Sr. O'Meagher Condon remained imprisoned until June 1878, when after semi-persistent petitioning from Irish-American politicians he was released on condition he not return to the United Kingdom for 30 years. O'Meagher Condon went into exile and settled in New York City, where many other Fenians had also gone. There, O'Meagher Condon joined the Irish Republican organisation Clan na Gael and continued to espouse radical Irish nationalism, expressing support for the Fenian dynamite campaign. However, following the murder of Patrick Henry Cronin in Chicago by members of Clan na Gael which caused shock and outrage across the United States, O'Meagher Condon was forced to reduce his radicalism and thereafter withdrew from public politics, beginning a career in journalism. During a tour of Ireland in 1909, O'Meagher Condon's legacy was widely celebrated and he was given the freedom of the cities of Dublin, Cork and Waterford.

== Biography ==
=== Early life ===
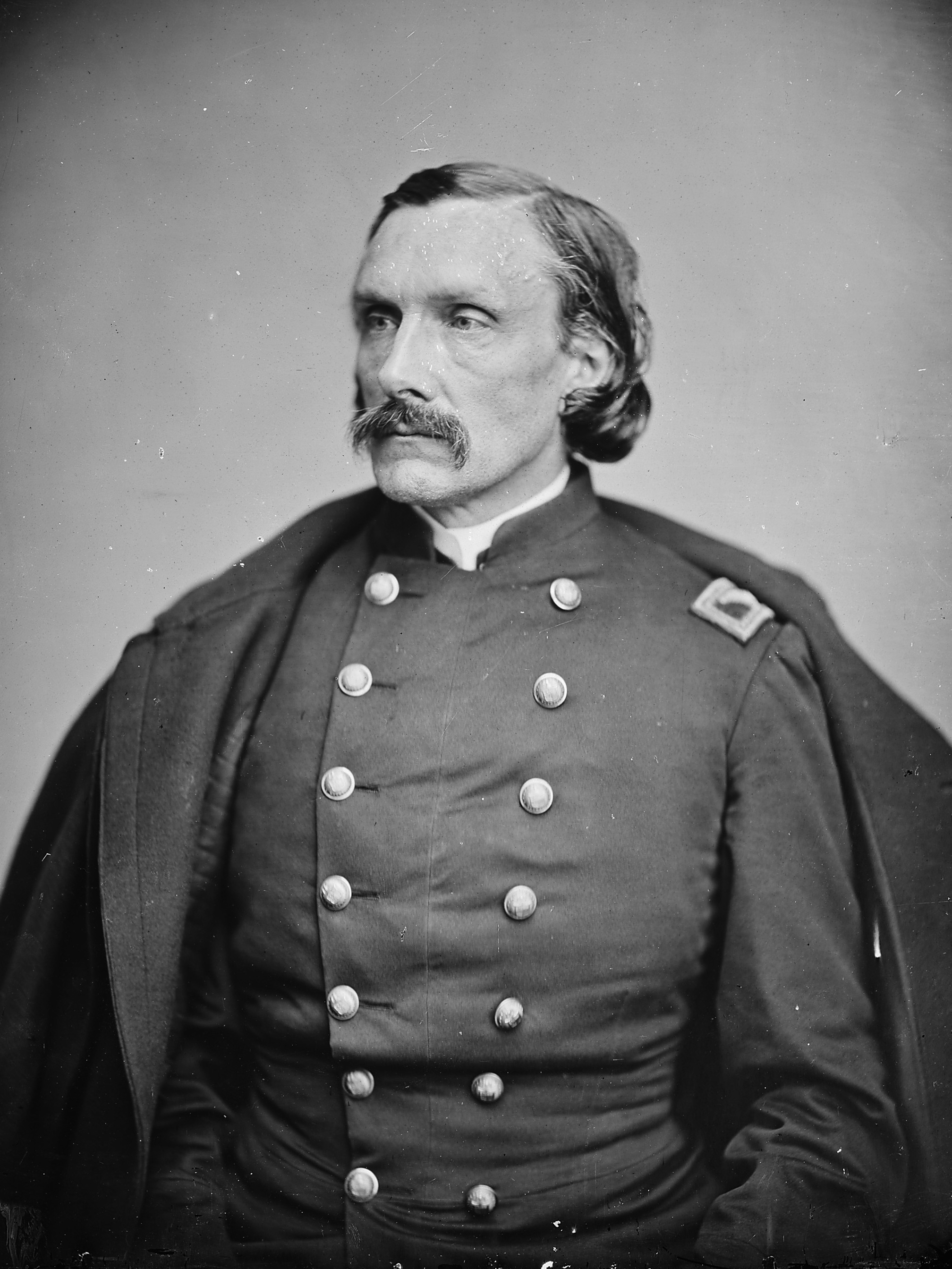
O'Meagher Condon was brought into Fenianism by John O'Mahony following a meeting in New York City

O'Meagher Condon was born in January 1840 to Thomas Condon, a farmer, and his wife Ellen Condon (née O'Meagher) near Mitchelstown in County Cork. The family immigrated to Prince Edward Island, near Nova Scotia, Canada in 1842. O'Meagher Condon was educated via a private tutor and by his teenage years was working (briefly) as a carpenter and sailing instructor.

In 1857 O'Meagher Condon was in New York City when he encountered the Gaelic scholar and leader of the Irish nationalist organisation the Fenian Brotherhood John O'Mahony, whom he quickly befriended. O'Mahoney had set up the Fenian Brotherhood two years prior, and upon O'Meagher Condon's return to Canada, resettling in Toronto, he set up his own branch of the organisation there.

=== American Civil War ===
In 1862, as the American Civil War began, O'Meagher Condon enlisted in the 69th New York Infantry Regiment which was composed overwhelmingly of Irish emigrants. He served with the unit for two years, during which time he was promoted to the rank of Lieutenant.

=== Fenian Rising of 1867 ===
In December 1866, the Fenian Brotherhood sent both O'Meagher Condon and Thomas J. Kelly to Ireland with the intention that they, alongside many other Irish-American veterans of the Civil War, would lead a rebellion against the British. The Rising suffered from poor planning, and logistical difficulties (most of the Fenians coming from the United States had to arrive separately to avoid arrest from the British), and lacked the element of surprise as the British authorities were largely aware of the plot. O'Meagher Condon did manage to make his way to Ireland and avoid arrest; he stationed himself at Macroom in his native County Cork, however, he did not see any fighting. Instead of one unified mass rebellion that occurred all at once, the Fenian Rising was a patchwork of small uprisings across Ireland that were never able to link up and were quickly put down.

By July 1867 it was clear the rebellion could not succeed, and O'Meagher Condon followed Kelly to Manchester, England where many of the Fenians were regrouping. Habeas corpus had been suspended in Ireland but remained in place in the rest of the United Kingdom, and the Fenians felt they would have greater legal protection if they reformed in England than in Ireland.

=== Rescue of Thomas Kelly and Manchester Martyrs case ===
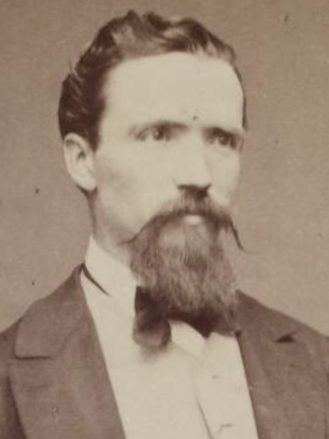
Thomas J. Kelly

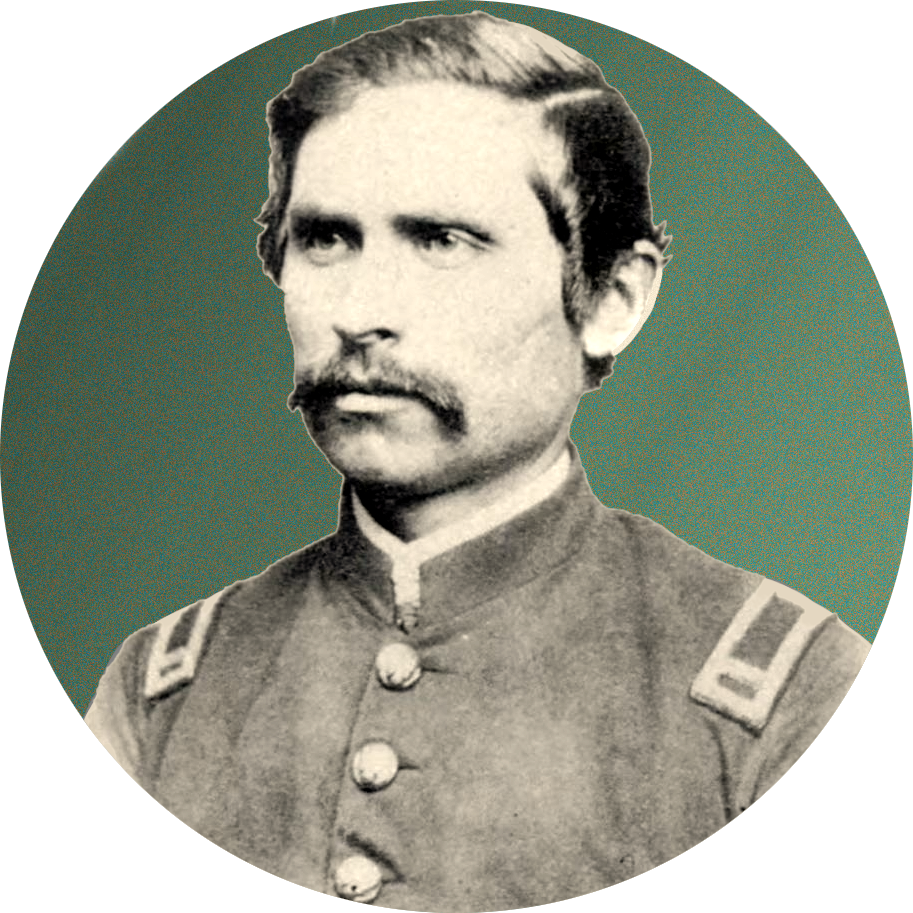
Timothy Deasy

On 18 September 1867 O'Meagher Condon led a rescue of Thomas J. Kelly and Timothy Deasy in Manchester, England. Although Kelly and Deasy managed to escape, O'Meagher Condon was amongst many Fenians captured, arrested and put on trial. The case became one of the largest in 19th-century Britain.

Nevertheless, Thomas Kelly was arrested alongside fellow Fenian Timothy Deasy for loitering by British authorities on 11 September 1867. Immediately O'Meagher Condon became the principal organiser of a rescue mission to break the two free. The Fenians were aided by the fact that Kelly and Deasy had given false names to the British, and were not aware of their true identities. On 18 September 1867, Kelly and Deasy were being transferred by police van from a courthouse to Belle Vue Gaol on Hyde Road, Gorton, accompanied by an unarmed police escort. O'Meagher Condon led a party of roughly 60 Irishmen armed with 40 revolvers that surrounded the van. Most of the unarmed police officers quickly fled the scene, but in the haste to open the van, Police Sergeant Charles Brett (who was inside the van and refused to open it) was killed. In doing so, Brett became one of the first Manchester police officers ever killed on duty.

Kelly and Deasy were able to make their escape but O'Meagher Condon was captured by a crowd who had gathered to witness the incident and later given to the police.

==== Trial ====
Initially, 26 men were brought before a grand jury and accused of murder, felony, and misdemeanour. However, this was soon whittled down to five primary defendants; William Philip Allen, Michael Larkin, Michael O'Brien, Thomas Maguire and O'Meagher Condon. O'Brien and O'Meagher Condon gave the false names "Thomas Gould" and "Edward Shore" respectively. The trial was largely a political exercise - none of the defendants had been the one to have fired the fatal shot that killed Police Sergeant Brett (it had been a Dubliner by the name of Peter Rice who had actually done so). During the trial, O'Meagher Condon and O'Brien (who also had American citizenship and who also fought for the Union in the American Civil War) petitioned the American ambassador to Britain to intervene on their behalf. Nonetheless, on 1 November 1867, despite a lack of evidence, all five men were sentenced to death by the court.

===== Speech from the Dock: "God Save Ireland" =====
Following being sentenced to death, O'Meagher Condon was allowed to make a speech from the Dock;

We have been found guilty, and, as a matter of course, we accept our death as gracefully as possible. We are not afraid to die at least I am not. I have no sin or stain upon me; and I leave this world at peace with all. With regard to the other prisoners who are to be tried afterwards, I hope our blood at least will satisfy the craving for it. I hope our blood will be enough; and that those men, who I honestly believe are guiltless of the blood of that man—that those other batches will get a fair, a free and more impartial trial. We view matters in a different light from what the jury do. We have been imprisoned, and have not had the advantage of understanding exactly to what this excitement has led. I can only hope and pray that this prejudice will disappear —that my oppressed country will right herself some day, and that her people, so far from being looked upon with scorn and aversion, will receive what they are entitled to, the respect not only of the civilised world but of Englishmen. I, too, am an American citizen, and on English territory, I have committed no crime which makes me amenable to the Crown of England.

I have done nothing; and, as a matter of course, I did expect protection — as this gentleman (pointing to O’Brien) has said, the protection of the Ambassador of my Government. I am a citizen of the State of Ohio; and I have to say my name is not Shore. My name is Edward O’Meagher Condon. I belong to Ohio, and there are loving hearts there that will be sorry for this. I have nothing but my best wishes to send them, and my warmest feelings, and to assure them I can die as a Christian and an Irishman, and am not ashamed or afraid of anything I have done, or the consequences, before God or man. They would be ashamed of me if I was in the slightest degree a coward, or concealed my opinions. The unfortunate divisions of our countrymen in America have, to a certain extent, neutralised the efforts that we have made either in one direction or another for the liberation of our country. All these things have thwarted us, and as a matter of course we must only submit to our fate. I only trust again that those who are to be tried after us will have a fair trial, and that our blood will satisfy the cravings which I understand exist. You will soon send us before God, and I am perfectly prepared to go. I have nothing to regret or to retract, or take back. I shall only say, GOD SAVE IRELAND.

I wish to add a word or two. There is nothing in the close of my political career which I regret. I don’t know of one act which could bring the blush of shame to my face, or make me afraid to meet my God or fellow man. I would be most happy, and nothing would give me greater pleasure than to die on the field for my country in defence of her liberty. As it is, I cannot die on the field, but I can die on the scaffold, I hope as a soldier, a man and a Christian.

— Edward O'Meagher Condon, Excerpt from O'Meagher Condon's speech from the Dock, 28 October 1867

Upon yelling "GOD SAVE IRELAND" before the court, all four of his co-accused immediately repeated the phrase. When this was reported in the newspaper, it rapidly became a rallying cry and slogan amongst Irish nationalists. By December 1867 Timothy Daniel Sullivan had written and published lyrics to a song entitled "God Save Ireland" to the tune of a popular American Civil War song, and from there on the song became an "unofficial Irish national anthem" for many decades.

==== Aftermath of the trial ====
Larkin, Allin and O'Brien were executed for their role in the O'Kelly and Deasy rescue

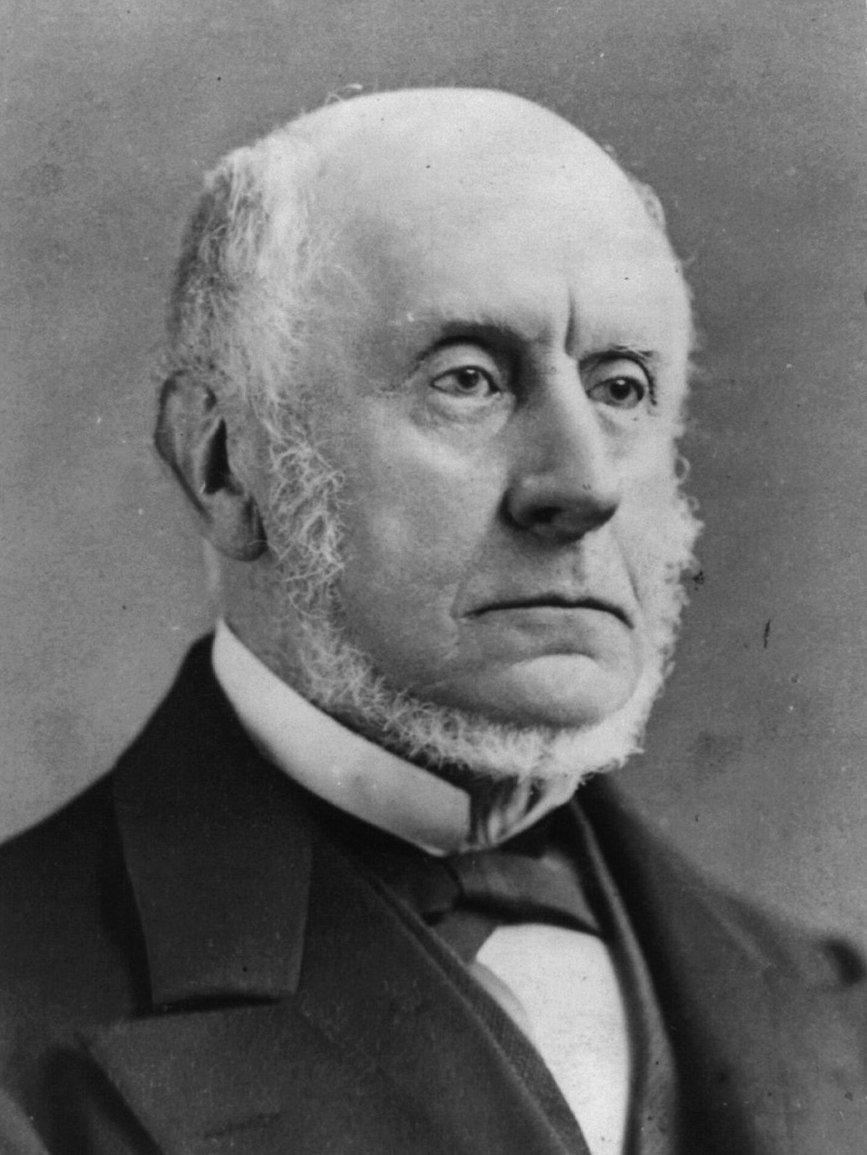
Charles Francis Adams Sr. was able to intervene in O'Meagher Condon's case and influence the British to commute his sentence

Although there was mass support for the verdict amongst the British public, British journalists and Liberals were immediately highly concerned, particularly in the case of Thomas Maguire as it was apparent there was no actual evidence to tie him to a crime. 30 English reporters sent an appeal to the English Home Secretary that Maguire be pardoned while leading liberal figures such as John Bright, Charles Bradlaugh and John Stuart Mill appealed for clemency. With so much doubt surrounding Maguire's conviction, this also called into question the verdict given to the other four defendants.

At the eleventh hour, the American ambassador to Britain Charles Francis Adams Sr. intervened and managed to convince the British authorities to commute O'Meagher Condon's sentence to life imprisonment. O'Brien, Allen and Larkin received no reprieve and were publicly executed via hanging on 22 November 1867 in front of 10,000 spectators. The executioner, William Calcraft, botched two of the executions and had to pull down on the legs of Larkin and O'Brien to kill them (their necks should have broken on the initial drop). In Ireland, Allen, Larkin and O'Brien became collectively known as the "Manchester Martyrs".

=== Imprisonment ===
Following the trial, O'Meagher Condon remained in English prisons for a decade. Throughout that time, his case was semi-regularly discussed in the British Parliament by figures such as John O'Connor Power (himself secretly a former Fenian and member of the Irish Republican Brotherhood) and in both houses of the United States Congress by Irish-American politicians. On 13 June 1878, this persistent petitioning paid off when both Houses of Congress passed a joint resolution asking President Rutherford B. Hayes to attempt to secure a fair trial for Condon. The British did not concede a retrial but instead offered to release O'Meagher Condon if he promised to leave the United Kingdom and not return for at least 30 years. O'Meagher Condon agreed.

=== Release and life in the United States ===
==== 1878 to 1889 ====
O'Meagher Condon arrived in New York City on 30 September 1878 where he was received by a large delegation of Irish-Americans. From there he was quickly feted at large events in New York, Boston and Philadelphia. He was recruited into the Irish Republican organisation Clan na Gael and was installed as the Clan na Gael leader in Washington, D.C., where O'Meagher Condon managed to secure work as a member of the clerical staff of the US treasury department.

O'Meagher Condon's decade in prison seemingly had only intensified his radicalism and soon he was openly supporting both the Irish Republican Brotherhood as well as the Irish National Land League, a radical agrarian movement that began in the west of Ireland in 1879 that sought to fight for Irish farmers' rights against landlords in Ireland. After the Land League dissolved in 1882, O'Meagher Condon responded by endorsing the Fenian Dynamite Campaign, which saw Irish Republicans travelling to England to bomb infrastructure and institutions.

However, after O'Meagher Condon's close friend William Mackey Lomasney was killed in November 1884 alongside three other Fenians in an attempt to bomb London Bridge, O'Meagher Condon turned against the campaign. He also began to distance himself from Clan na Gael's leadership.

Following the sensational murder of Patrick Henry Cronin in Chicago and the subsequent investigation into Clan na Gael in 1889, O'Meagher Condon signed a message to the American public which denied that the organisation was guilty of ‘un-American behaviour'. Nonetheless, in the aftermath of the Cronin murder O'Meagher Condon pulled away from revolutionary Irish nationalism.

==== Life after politics ====
Following many years in which he worked as an electrical engineer for the postal and fire departments of the municipal government of New York, O'Meagher Condon pivoted to working as a journalist by the early 1900s. He was mostly involved in Irish-American newspapers such as the Irish World.

On the urging of John Finerty and Patrick Egan, O'Meagher Condon became involved in the American wing of the United Irish League. In 1909, the UIL brought O'Meagher Condon back to Ireland as part of a lecture tour. As part of this tour, O'Meagher Condon was widely celebrated and he was given the Freedom of the City of Dublin as well as the Freedom of the cities of Cork, Sligo, Waterford, and Wexford. O'Meagher Condon remained affiliated with the UIL until his death in New York on 15 December 1915.
