= Charles Brett (disambiguation) =

Sir Charles Brett (1928–2005) was a Northern Irish solicitor and first chairman of the Ulster Architectural Heritage Society.

Charles Brett may also refer to:

- Charles Brett (politician) (c. 1715–1799), British Member of Parliament
- Charles Brett (police officer) (1815–1867), Manchester police sergeant murdered by the Manchester Martyrs
