= God Save Ireland =

Irish rebel song

"God Save Ireland" is an Irish rebel song celebrating the Manchester Martyrs, three Fenians executed in 1867. It served as an unofficial anthem for Irish nationalists from the 1870s to the 1910s.

== Composition ==
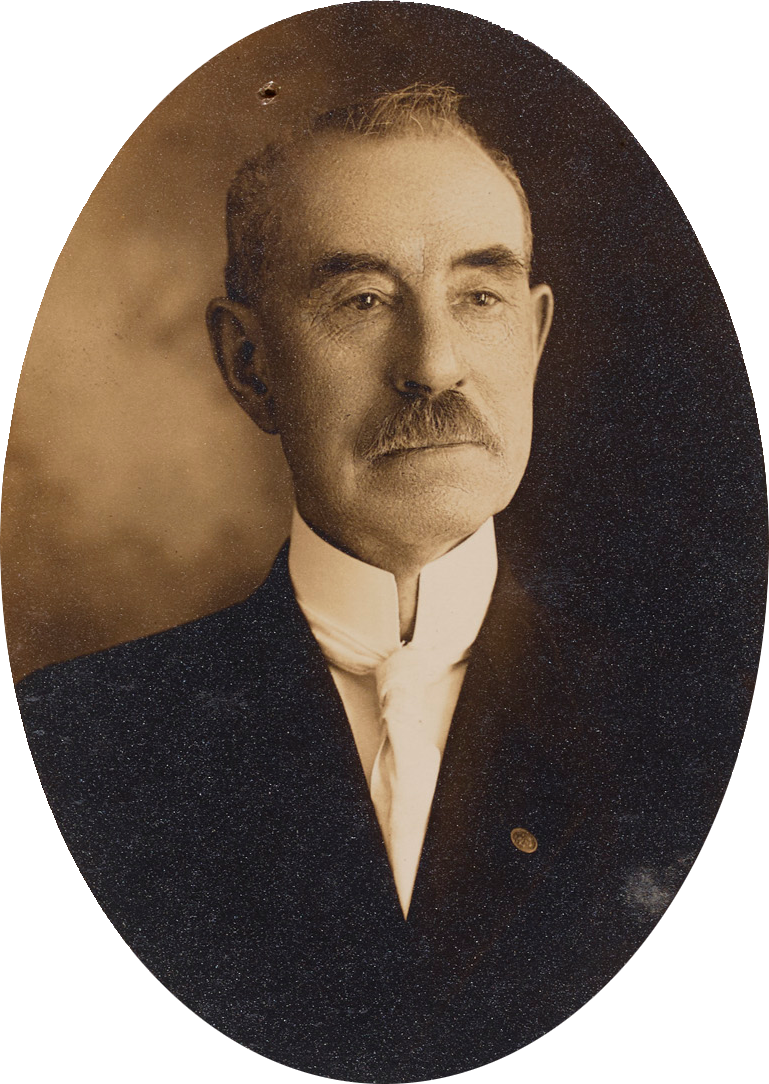
Edward O'Meagher Condon's yelling of "God Save Ireland!" during the Manchester Martyrs trial transformed the phrase into an Irish nationalist rallying cry

On 18 September 1867, a group of 20–30 men effected the escape of two Fenian prisoners by ambushing the carriage transporting them to Belle Vue Gaol in Manchester. An attempt to shoot the lock off the carriage door caused the death of a police guard. In the following weeks, 28 men were arrested, 26 sent for trial, and five tried on 29 October. None had fired the fatal shot; all were charged with murder under the common purpose and felony murder doctrines. One of the five, Edward O'Meagher Condon, concluded his speech from the dock with the words "God Save Ireland", a motto taken up by supporters in the public gallery. All five were convicted and sentenced to death, again responding "God Save Ireland". One was acquitted on appeal as the evidence was shown to be unreliable; although the others were convicted on the evidence of the same witnesses, their sentences stood, though Condon's was commuted. The other three, Michael Larkin, William Phillip Allen, and Michael O'Brien, were hanged on 23 November 1867 and dubbed the Manchester Martyrs, not merely by physical force Irish republicans but more generally by Irish nationalists who felt a miscarriage of justice had occurred.

The phrase "God Save Ireland" was quickly repeated by campaigners for their pardon and, after their hanging, by organisers of commemorations. The lyrics to "God Save Ireland" written by Timothy Daniel Sullivan were first published on 7 December 1867, the day before the Martyrs' funeral. Two other songs with the same title had been published before Sullivan's. To hasten his song's adoption, Sullivan set it to the well-known tune of "Tramp! Tramp! Tramp!", a popular pro-Union song of the American Civil War. (Note: Other songs using the same tune include "Jesus Loves the Little Children" (1910) and Ernst Busch's anti-American song "Ami go home!" (1952).) The lines "whether on the scaffold high / Or on battlefield we die" were similar to lines from "The Place where Man should Die", by Michael Joseph Barry, published in 1843 in The Nation.

Later, James J. Johnson, best known for writing one of the melodies for "A Nation Once Again", also composed a musical setting for "God Save Ireland".

== Nationalist anthem ==
In the late 19th and early 20th century, "God Save Ireland" was habitually sung at gatherings of Irish nationalists, both in Ireland and abroad; it was considered the anthem of the Home Rule movement, in particular the Irish Parliamentary Party, coming to be described as the "Irish national anthem". During the Parnellite split of the 1890s, "God Save Ireland" was the anthem of the anti-Parnellite Irish National Federation. John McCormack, an Irish tenor residing in the United States, had a big hit with the number, making the first of his popular phonograph records of it in 1906.

The song was sung by the insurgents during the Easter Rising of 1916, but thereafter it fell out of favour. The heavily wounded Cathal Brugha who was presumed dead was discovered by Commandant Éamonn Ceannt singing the song with his pistol still in hand. Just as the Irish Parliamentary Party and the green harp flag were eclipsed by Sinn Féin and the Irish tricolour, so "God Save Ireland" was eclipsed by "The Soldiers' Song", which was formally adopted in 1926 as the anthem of the Irish Free State created in 1922.

== In sport ==
The song was sung at football matches by fans of Celtic F.C. and the Republic of Ireland team. The melody of the chorus was adapted for "Ally's Tartan Army", the Scotland national football team's anthem for the FIFA World Cup 1978, this was itself adapted as the chorus of "Put 'Em Under Pressure", the anthem for the Republic of Ireland team for the FIFA World Cup 1990.

== Lyrics ==
High upon the gallows tree swung the noble-hearted three.
By the vengeful tyrant stricken in their bloom;
But they met him face to face, with the courage of their race,
And they went with souls undaunted to their doom.

Chorus:
"God save Ireland!" said the heroes;
"God save Ireland" said they all.
Whether on the scaffold high
Or the battlefield we die,
Oh, what (Note: Also 'Oh, no matter when for Ireland dear we fall!') matter when for Erin dear we fall!

Girt around with cruel foes, still their courage proudly rose,
For they thought of hearts that loved them far and near;
Of the millions true and brave o'er the ocean's swelling wave,
And the friends in holy Ireland ever dear.

(Chorus)

Climbed they up the rugged stair, rang their voices out in prayer,
Then with England's fatal cord around them cast,
Close beside the gallows tree kissed like brothers lovingly,
True to home and faith and freedom to the last.

(Chorus)

Never till the latest day shall the memory pass away,
Of the gallant lives thus given for our land;
But on the cause must go, amidst joy and weal and woe,
Till we make our Isle a nation free and grand.

(Chorus)

== See also ==
- Dear Old Ireland
