= Manchester Martyrs =

Three Irish nationalists hanged in 1867

Portraits of the Manchester Martyrs – Larkin (left), Allen (centre) and O'Brien (right) – on a shamrock

The Manchester Martyrs (Irish: Mairtirígh Mhanchain) were three Irish Republicans – William Philip Allen, Michael Larkin, and Michael O'Brien – who were hanged in 1867 following their conviction of murder after an attack on a police van in Manchester, England, in which a police officer was accidentally shot dead, an incident that was known at the time as the Manchester Outrages. The three men were members of the Irish Republican Brotherhood, also known as the Fenians, an organisation dedicated to ending British rule in Ireland, and were among a group of 30 to 40 Fenians who attacked a horse-drawn police van transporting two arrested leaders of the Brotherhood, Thomas J. Kelly and Timothy Deasy, to Belle Vue Gaol. Police Sergeant Charles Brett, travelling inside with the keys, was shot and killed while looking through the keyhole of the van as the attackers attempted to force the door open by shooting the lock.

Kelly and Deasy were released after another prisoner in the van took the keys from Brett's body and passed them to the group outside through a ventilation grill; the pair were never recaptured, despite an extensive search. Although Allen and Larkin admitted taking part in the attack, none of the defendants was accused of firing the fatal shot, but they were convicted on the basis of "joint enterprise" for taking part in a criminal enterprise that ended in the killing. The trial has nonetheless been described by an eminent Irish historian as "unsatisfactory", and the evidence as "dubious".

Two others were also charged and found guilty of Brett's murder, Thomas Maguire and Edward O'Meagher Condon, but their death sentences were overturned—O'Meagher Condon's through the intercession of the United States government (he was an American citizen), and Maguire's because the evidence given against him was considered unsatisfactory by the court. Allen, Larkin and O'Brien were publicly hanged on a temporary structure built on the wall of Salford Gaol, on 23 November 1867, in front of a crowd of 8,000–10,000.

Ireland reacted with revulsion and anger to the executions, and Allen, Larkin and O'Brien were hailed as political martyrs. Annual commemorations were held throughout Ireland, and monuments were built in many Irish towns. Brett, the first Manchester City Police officer to be killed on duty, is memorialised in a monument in St Ann's Church.

== Background ==
The whole of Ireland had been under British rule since the end of the Nine Years' War in 1603. The Irish Republican Brotherhood (IRB) was founded on 17 March 1858 by James Stephens, with the aim of establishing an independent democratic republic in Ireland. The IRB was a revolutionary fraternal organisation, rather than an insurrectionary conspiracy; Stephens believed that a "thorough social revolution" was required in Ireland before the people could become republicans. The Fenian Brotherhood was founded in New York in 1858 by John O'Mahony, ostensibly the IRB's American wing. By 1865 the IRB had an estimated 100,000 members, and was carrying out frequent acts of violence in metropolitan Britain. The Irish community in Manchester accounted for more than 10 per cent of the population, and one contemporary estimate put the number of Fenians and Fenian sympathisers living within 50 miles (80 km) of the city at 50,000.

In 1867 the Fenians were preparing to launch an armed uprising against British rule, but their plans became known to the authorities, and several key members of the movement's leadership were arrested and convicted. Two succeeded in evading the police, Thomas J. Kelly and Timothy Deasy, and travelled from Ireland to Britain to reorganise and raise the morale of the Fenian groups there in the wake of the failed uprising. Both were Irish Americans who had fought with distinction in the American Civil War—Kelly achieving the rank of colonel and Deasy that of captain—and both had played important roles in the abortive uprising; Kelly had been declared the chief executive of the Irish Republic at a secret republican convention, and Deasy commanded a Fenian brigade in County Cork.

During the early hours of 11 September 1867, police arrested two men found loitering in Oak Street, Shudehill, suspecting them of planning to rob a shop. Both were charged under the Vagrancy Act and held in custody. The Manchester police were initially unaware of their identities, until their colleagues in the Irish police identified them as Kelly and Deasy.

== Rescue ==
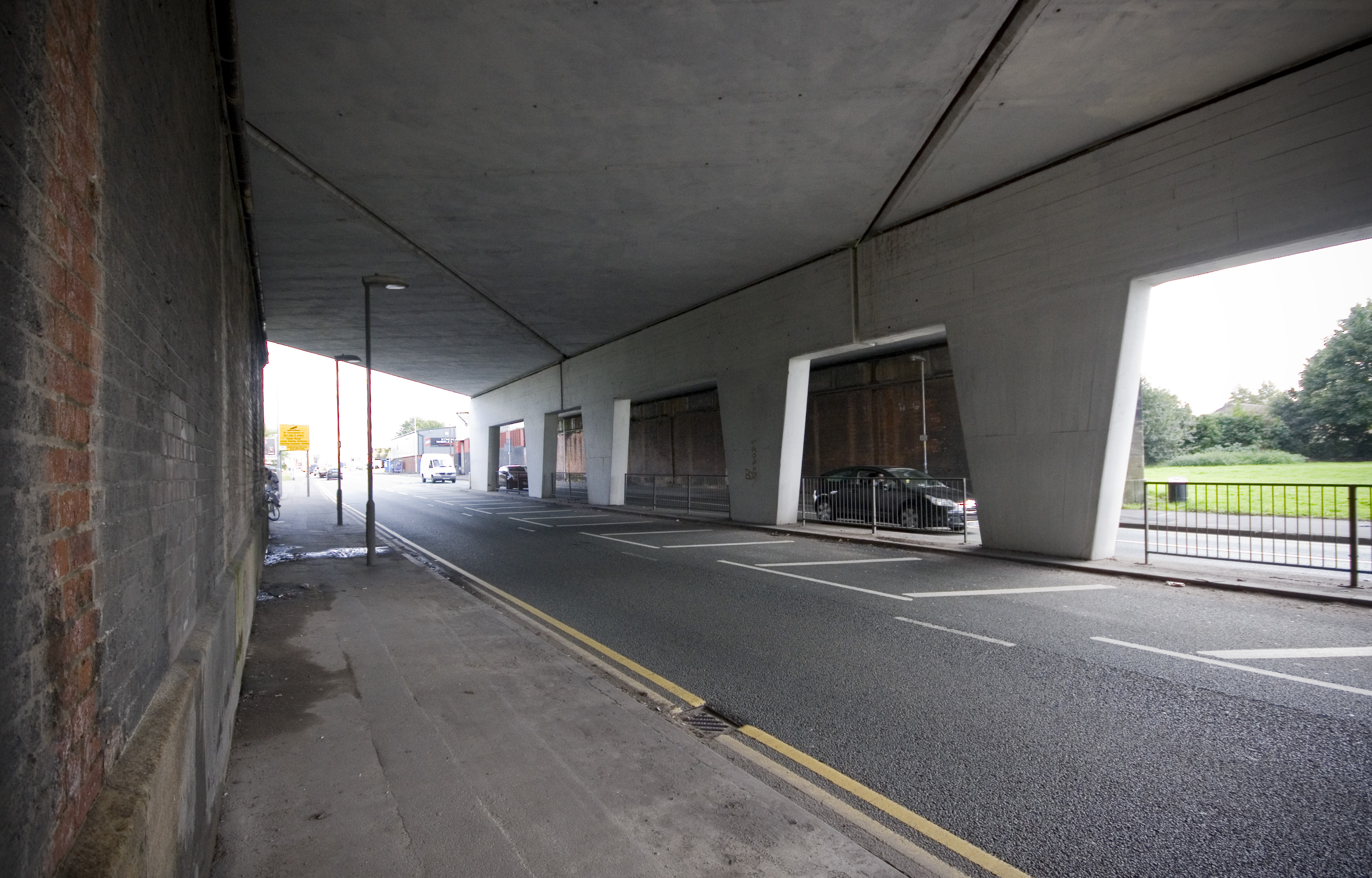
The scene of the attack, on Hyde Road, Manchester. This modern bridge has replaced the original "Fenian Arch".

On 18 September 1867, Kelly and Deasy were being transferred from the courthouse to Belle Vue Gaol on Hyde Road, Gorton. They were handcuffed and locked in two separate compartments inside a police van escorted by a squad of 12 mounted policemen. The van contained six prisoners: a 12-year-old boy who was being taken to a reformatory, three women convicted of misdemeanours, and the two Fenians. As it passed under a railway arch, a man darted into the middle of the road, pointed a pistol at the driver and told him to stop. Simultaneously, a party of about 30–40 men leaped over a wall at the side of the road, surrounded the van and seized the horses, one of which they shot. The unarmed police were described by O'Meagher Condon, who organised the attack on the police van, as "a miscellaneous lot, apparently embracing the long and short and the fat and lean of the Manchester force"; they offered little resistance and soon fled.

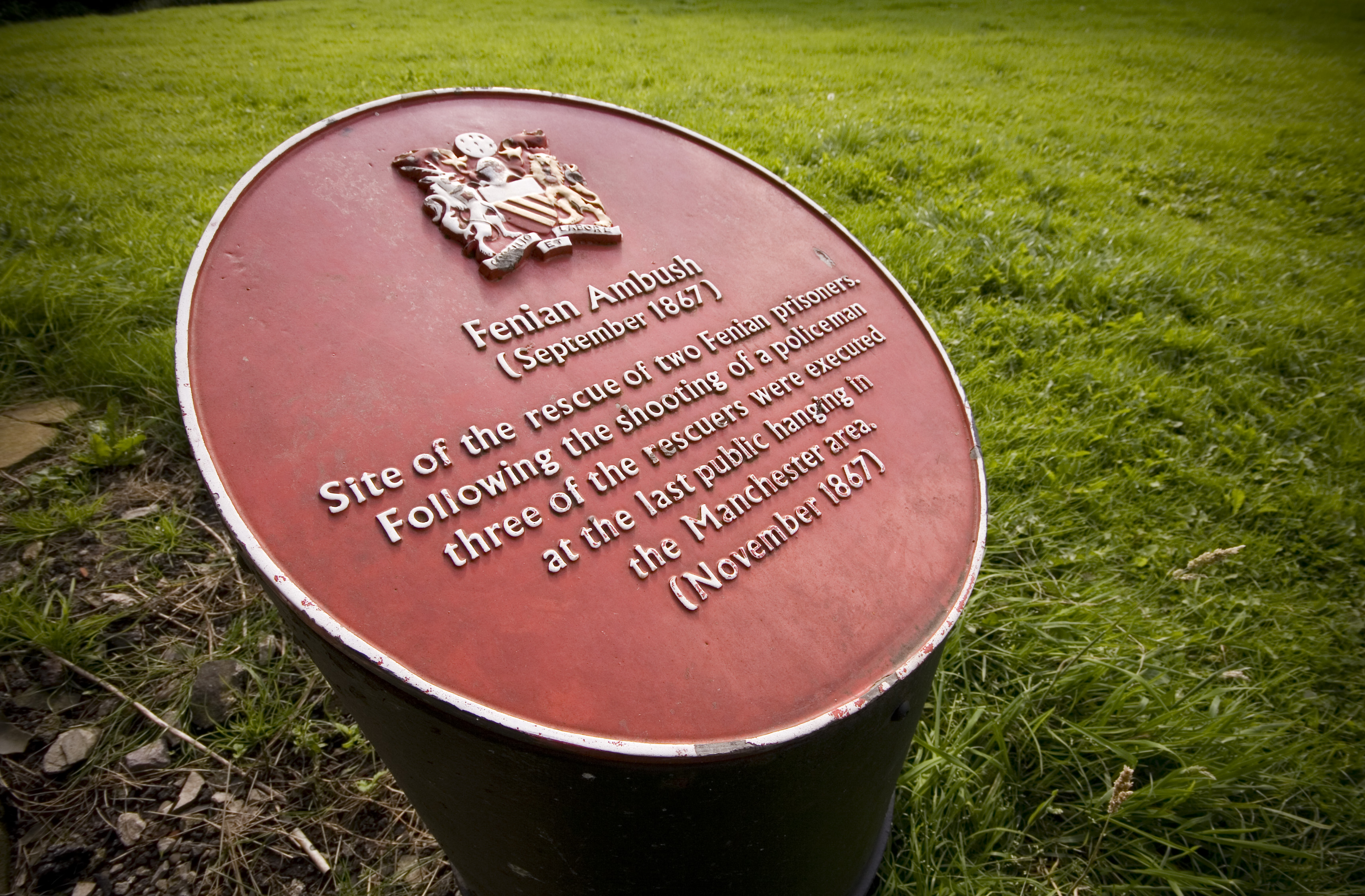
A commemoration plaque at the site of the incident

The rescuers, after an unsuccessful attempt to force open the van with hatchets, sledgehammers, and crowbars, called upon Police Sergeant Brett, who was inside the van with the prisoners, to open the door. Brett refused, so one of the rescuers placed his revolver at the keyhole of the van to blow the lock, just as Brett looked through the keyhole to see what was happening outside. The bullet passed through his eye into his brain and killed him. The door was opened when one of the women prisoners took the keys from Brett's pocket, and passed them through a ventilator to the Fenians outside, allowing Kelly and Deasy to escape. Brett was the first Manchester police officer to be killed on duty, in an incident that became known locally as the "Manchester Outrages".

== Investigation ==
The police suspected that Kelly and Deasy had been taken by their rescuers to Ancoats, considered at that time to be a Fenian area of Manchester. Anonymous letters alleged that the pair were being sheltered in a house on Every Street, but the 50 armed police who raided the premises found no signs of the fugitives. Despite a reward of £300 offered by the authorities, equivalent to about seven times a worker's average annual earnings, neither Kelly nor Deasy was recaptured. An article published in the 14 November edition of The Times newspaper reported that they had made their way to Liverpool, from where they had taken passage on a ship bound for New York.

The police raided Manchester's Irish quarters and brought "dozens of suspects, selected almost at random", before local magistrates; the raids have been described as a "reign of terror" for the Irish in Manchester. Amongst those arrested was Thomas Maguire, a young Royal Marine on leave who had been in the vicinity of the attack on the police van and was Irish. Such was the zeal of the police that one man with a strong Irish accent surrendered himself to the magistrates "as the only means I have of saving myself from being arrested over and over again wherever I go, as a Fenian".

== Committal proceedings ==
On 27 September 1867 committal proceedings were heard in front of a magistrate to establish whether there was a prima facie case against the 28 accused. The team of defence barristers included Chartist leader Ernest Jones, who had spent two years in prison for making seditious speeches, and W. P. Roberts, whose fee was paid by subscribers to a defence fund to represent nine of the men. Jones, representing Condon and O'Brien, clashed with the court almost immediately because the accused were handcuffed, saying "It appears to be discreditable to the administration of justice that men whom the law presumes to be innocent should be brought into Court handcuffed together like a couple of hounds." Jones also objected to the presence of a number of soldiers in the courtroom, and when the magistrate refused to order the prisoners' handcuffs to be removed he "marched dramatically" out of the courtroom saying "Then as a member of the Bar I decline to sit in any Court where the police override the Magistrate ... I cannot disgrace the Bar by proceeding with the defence."

All but two of the accused, Allen and Larkin, claimed that they had witnesses who would testify that they were elsewhere when the police van was attacked. The defence argued that "the rescue was not illegal as the prisoners [Kelly and Deasy] were wrongly imprisoned", and that there was no intention of "sacrificing human life", as evidenced by only a single fatality despite the presence of so many guns and so many shots being fired. Nevertheless, 26 of the prisoners were sent for trial before a judge and jury at the next assizes; two were released because of "unsatisfactory identification".

== Trial ==
Proceedings began on 28 October 1867, in front of Mr Justice Blackburne and Mr Justice Mellor. Twenty-six appeared in court on the first day in front of a grand jury, which found that there was a prima facie case against all of the defendants for murder, felony, and misdemeanour. It was decided to charge the five "principal offenders"—Allen, Larkin, Gould (O'Brien), Shore (Condon), and Maguire—under one indictment. They were therefore brought back to the courtroom the following day, when their trial proper began, despite none of them having fired the fatal shot. However, under the terms of the English law principle of common purpose "joint enterprise", all that flowed from the execution of a plan made all the participants liable – and both Allen and Larkin admitted to being participants in the attempt to free the prisoners.

Allen was a 19-year-old carpenter; Larkin was a tailor, the only married member of the group, and had five children. O'Brien, who had fought in the American Civil War, was a 30-year-old shop assistant from County Cork. O'Meagher Condon, born in Cork and 32 years old, had also fought for the Union side in the American Civil War. Thomas Maguire was a Royal Marine who had served for 10 years and had just returned home on leave.

The trial took place in what was described as a "climate of anti-Irish hysteria" by the radical British weekly Reynold's Newspaper, which described it as a "deep and everlasting disgrace to the English government", the product of an ignoble panic which seized the governing classes. A yell of vengeance, it said, had issued from every aristocratic organ, and that before any evidence had been obtained the prisoners' guilt was assumed and their executions had been demanded. The Irish historian F. S. L. Lyons, writing in the 1970s, said that the men were convicted "after an unsatisfactory trial, and on evidence that, to say the least, was dubious". More recently, the events have been described as "accidental murder, public panic and rumour-mongering, elaborate trial...and lingering doubts about a miscarriage of justice."

The jury retired at 6:15 pm on the fifth day and returned at 7:30 pm to give its verdict of guilty for each of the five defendants. When asked if they had anything to say before sentence was passed, several of the convicted men made a closing speech. Allen stated his innocence, and that he regretted the death of Sergeant Brett, but that he was prepared to "die proudly and triumphantly in defence of republican principles and the liberty of an oppressed and enslaved people".

Larkin said he felt that he had received a fair trial, and that his counsel had done everything they could in his defence. He ended by saying: "So I look to the mercy of God. May God forgive all who have sworn my life away. As I am a dying man, I forgive them from the bottom of my heart. May God forgive them."

O'Brien claimed that all of the evidence given against him was false, and that as an American citizen he ought not to be facing trial in a UK court. He then went on at length to condemn the British government, the "imbecile and tyrannical rulers" of Ireland, until he was interrupted by the judge, who appealed to him to cease his remarks: "The only effect of your observations must be to tell against you with those who have to consider the sentence. I advise you to say nothing more of that sort. I do so entirely for your own sake."

O'Meagher Condon's address to the court was considered by The Times to have "excelled all the other convicts in his zeal for the Fenian cause". He admitted to having organised the attack on the police van in his role as leader of the north-west section of the movement, but claimed that he "never threw a stone or fired a pistol; I was never at the place [where the attack took place] ... it is all totally false". He went on to say that "had I committed anything against the Crown of England, I would have scorned myself had I attempted to deny it". Towards the end of his speech he shouted, "God save Ireland!", a cry taken up by his companions in the dock.

Allen, Larkin, O'Brien, Maguire and O'Meagher Condon were sentenced to death by hanging—the only punishment English law at that time allowed for murder—again crying "God save Ireland" from the dock after sentence was pronounced. In Thomas Maguire's case the witnesses who had identified the prisoners and had testified that Maguire was in the forefront of the attack had their evidence shown to be transparently false. This resulted in over 30 English reporters sending an appeal to the Home Secretary to have him pardoned. With such widespread doubts about the conviction of Maguire the government yielded to the pressure to grant him a pardon. This led many to believe that the other four would not be hanged since they had been convicted on the evidence of the same witnesses who, according to Liz Curtis, had "blatantly perjured themselves in the case of Maguire". While eminent lawyers tried through procedural means to halt the executions, leading figures such as John Bright, Charles Bradlaugh and John Stuart Mill appealed for clemency. O'Meagher Condon's sentence was commuted on the eve of his execution.

== Execution ==
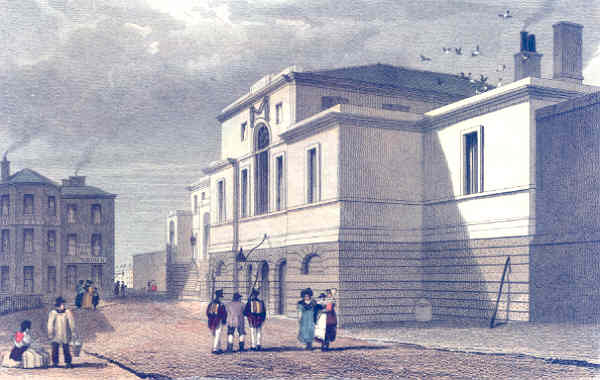
New Bailey Prison at Salford, 1832

A crowd estimated at 8,000–10,000 gathered outside the walls of Salford Gaol on the evening of 22 November 1867 to witness the public execution of the three convicted men the following morning. A platform had been built about 30 feet (9.1 m) above ground, through the outside wall of the jail facing New Bailey Street, to support the gallows. The spectators were "well supplied by the gin palaces of Deansgate and the portable beer and coffee stalls". According to Father Gadd, one of the three Catholic priests who attended to the men:

A crowd of inhuman ghouls from the purlieus of Deansgate and the slums of the City ... made the night and early morning hideous with the raucous bacchanalian strains of "Champagne Charlie", "John Brown", and "Rule Britannia". No Irish mingled with the throng ... They had obeyed the instructions of their Clergy. Throughout Manchester and Salford, silent congregations with tear-stained faces ... assembled for a celebration of early Mass for the eternal welfare of the young Irishmen doomed to die a dreadful death that morning.

The authorities took considerable pains to discourage any rescue attempt. Over 2,500 regular and special police were deployed in and around the prison, augmented by a military presence which included a detachment of the 72nd Highlanders and a squadron of the Eighth Hussars. All traffic in and out of the city was stopped. The Times newspaper reported that by the time the hangings took place, shortly after 8:00 am, "the mob were quiet and orderly", in contrast to the previous night and early morning.

The executioner, William Calcraft, was the most famous of the 19th century, but was reportedly nervous of executing Fenians, because of threats he had received. He was also "particularly incompetent", and was "notoriously unable to calculate the correct length of rope required for each individual hanging; he frequently had to rush below the scaffold to pull on his victim's legs to hasten death". Most accounts claim that Allen died almost instantaneously from a broken neck, but Larkin and O'Brien were not so fortunate. Father Gadd reported that:

The other two ropes, stretched taut and tense by their breathing twitching burdens, were in ominous and distracting movement. The hangman had bungled! ... Calcraft then descended into the pit and there finished what he could not accomplish from above. He killed Larkin.

Father Gadd refused to allow Calcraft to dispatch O'Brien in the same way, and so "for three-quarters of an hour the good priest knelt, holding the dying man's hands within his own, reciting the prayers for the dying. Then the long drawn out agony ended."

The bodies of the three men were buried in the New Bailey Prison graveyard, from which they were transferred to Strangeways Prison Cemetery when New Bailey Prison closed in 1868. In 1991 their remains were among those of 63 executed who were exhumed from Strangeways following rebuilding work, cremated and reinterred at Blackley Cemetery in Manchester.

== Aftermath ==
Most of the British press had demanded "retribution swift and stern", not just because the men were Irish, but because they were Fenians; "the public demand for the death penalty was not simply an expression of anti-Irish sentiment, but rather a product of the Fenian panic and popular feelings of insecurity and the desire for order." The Daily Telegraph, for instance, although like most of its contemporaries describing Brett's death as "a vulgar, dastardly murder", nevertheless supported reform in Ireland; "we may hang convicted Fenians with good conscience, but we should also thoroughly redress those evils distinctly due to English policy and still supported by English power."

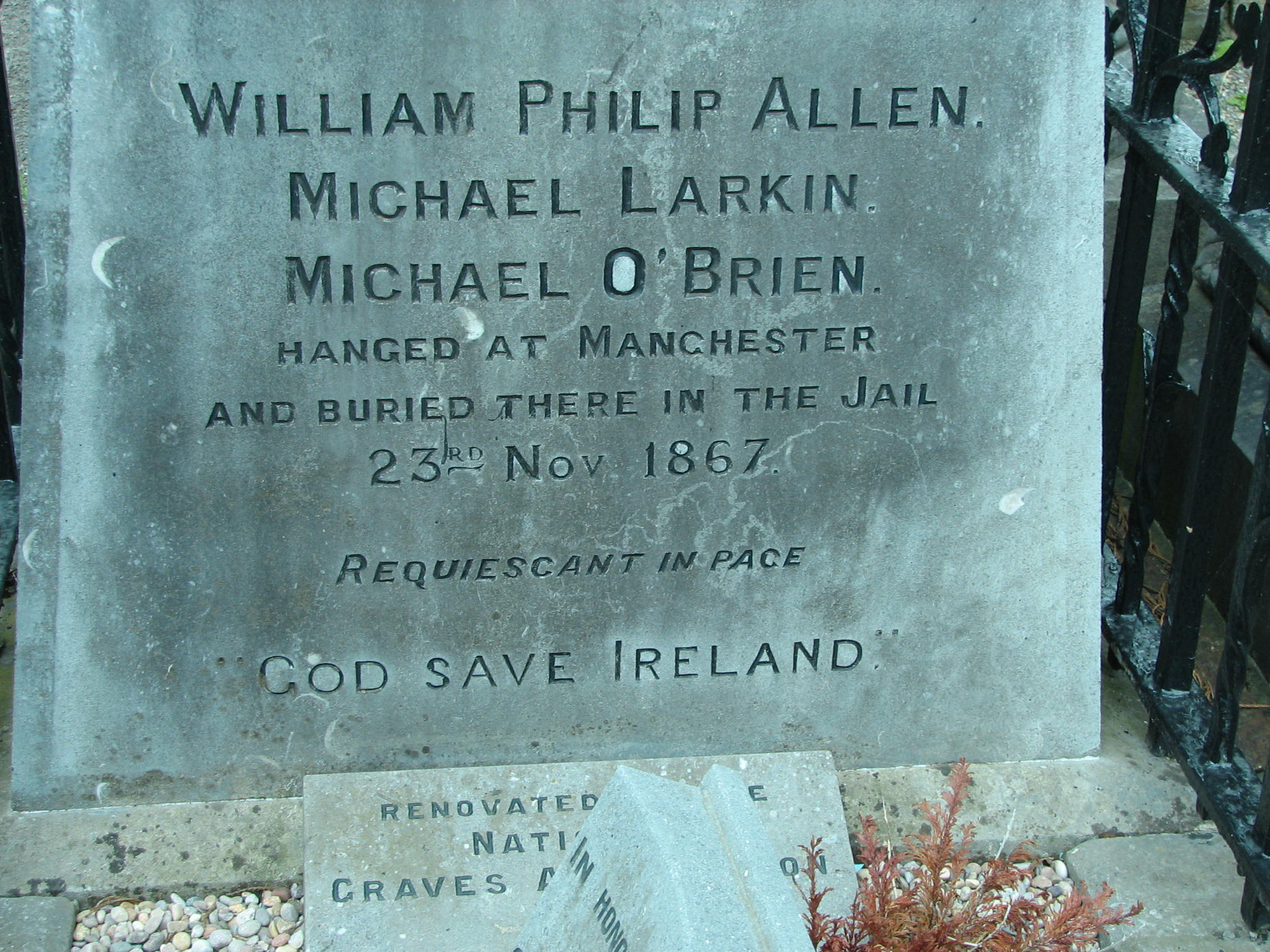
Manchester Martyrs monument, Glasnevin, Dublin

Ireland reacted to the executions with revulsion and anger. Allen, Larkin and O'Brien were hailed as political martyrs. Many funeral processions were held in Ireland and even in a few British cities during the weeks following the executions, sometimes attracting crowds of thousands. These demonstrations of support for the three Fenians further outraged British public opinion, and "reinforced the prevailing sentiment that the Irish moral compass was somehow off-center". The executions gave rise to an enormous groundswell of feeling among Irish communities the world over. In New Zealand, for instance, seven men were convicted of unlawful assembly in a high-profile trial following a mock funeral to Hokitika cemetery; two of the seven, a newspaper editor and a priest, pleaded guilty to seditious libel, having published "a succession of very rabid articles about the Queen's Government." The viceregal government declared the holding of a Manchester Martyr funeral procession illegal. Throughout Ireland Masses, even public ones, were said for the three, although Bishop David Moriarty of Kerry prohibited celebration of Mass for them in his diocese. Archbishop John MacHale of Tuam, on the other hand, personally assisted at a High Mass for them, and Cardinal Archbishop Paul Cullen of Dublin, while opposing public celebrations, instructed his priests to pray for the dead Fenians, and to say Mass privately for them.

The day after the executions, Frederick Engels wrote to Karl Marx:

So yesterday morning the Tories, by the hand of Mr Calcraft, accomplished the final act of separation between England and Ireland. The only thing that the Fenians still lacked were martyrs. They have been provided by Derby and G Hardy. Only the execution of the three has made the liberation of Kelly and Deasy the heroic deed which will now be sung to every Irish babe in the cradle in Ireland, England and America ... To my knowledge, the only time that anybody has been executed for a similar matter in a civilised country was the case of John Brown at Harpers Ferry. The Fenians could not have wished for a better precedent. The Southerners had at least the decency to treat J. Brown as a rebel, whereas here everything is being done to transform a political attempt into a common crime.

Annual commemorations, often involving mock funerals and stirring speeches, continued to be held in many towns in Ireland into the twentieth century. The cry of the condemned men was the inspiration for the song "God Save Ireland", which became Ireland's unofficial national anthem until officially replaced by "Amhrán na bhFiann" ("The Soldier's Song"). The executions were also "incalculable" in their influence on the "political awakening" of Charles Stewart Parnell. Speaking in the House of Commons ten years later, Parnell told the House: "I wish to say as directly as I can that I do not believe, and never shall believe, that any murder was committed in Manchester."

== Monuments ==
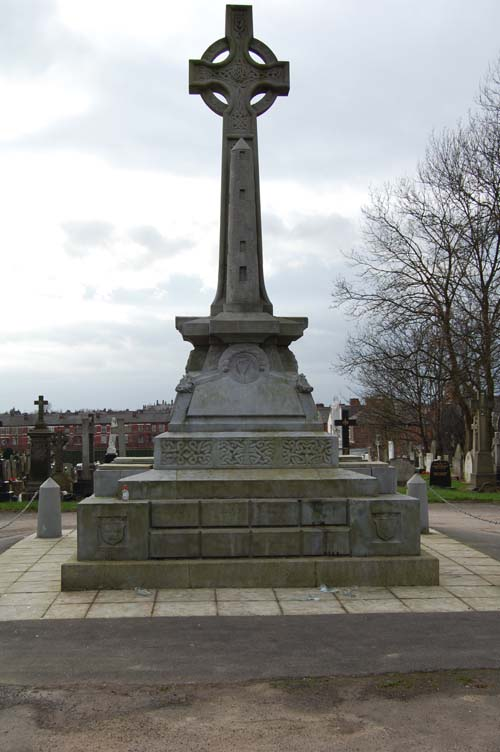
Monument to the Manchester Martyrs in St Joseph's Cemetery, Moston, Manchester

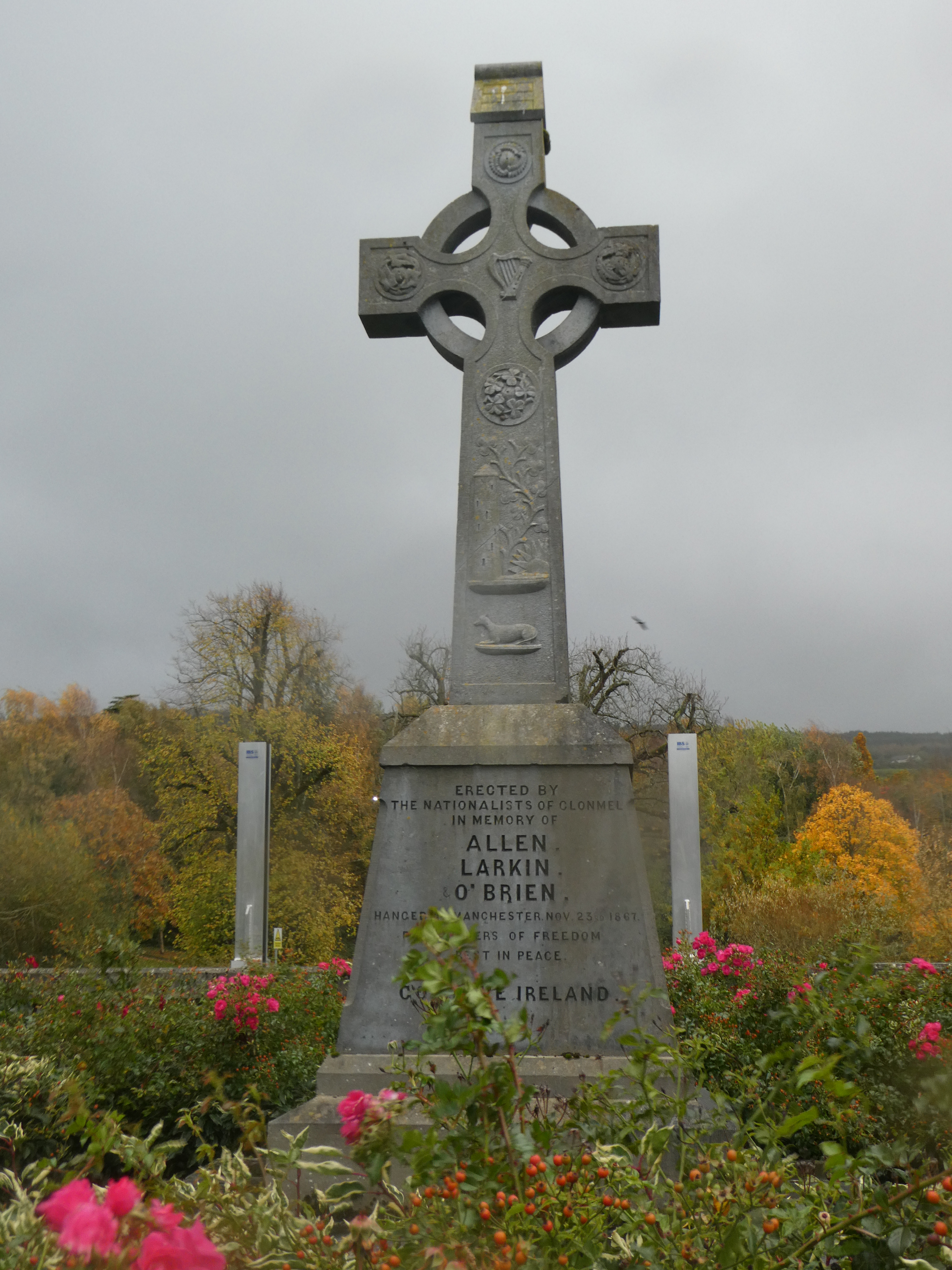
Monument in Clonmel, County Tipperary

Monuments erected in honour of Allen, Larkin, and O'Brien stand in Skibbereen, County Cork, Tralee (County Kerry), Limerick, Kilrush (County Clare), Clonmel (County Tipperary), Tipperary Town (County Tipperary), Birr (County Offaly), Ennis (County Clare), Milltown Cemetery, Belfast, (County Antrim), Ladysbridge (County Cork), Glasnevin Cemetery (Dublin), and in St Joseph's Cemetery, Moston, Manchester. The monument in St Joseph's Cemetery was designed by J. Geraghty and unveiled in November 1898 (53°30′56.17″N 2°11′24.14″W). Commissioned by the Manchester Martyrs Central Memorial Committee, it stands just over 20 feet (6 m) high and takes the form of a Celtic cross. On three sides of the pedestal are medallion portraits of the three men, originally surmounted by figures of the Irish Wolfhound, now removed. The site of this monument has been the scene of several disturbances, as it has been the tradition for Republicans to parade there on the anniversary of the deaths of those hanged. The monument has suffered several attacks to its structure, as well as acts of vandalism, and is listed as being "at risk" by the Public Monument and Sculpture Association National Recording Project.

To commemorate the centenary of the men's execution, the Manchester Connolly Association commissioned the artist Arthur Dooley to produce a memorial sculpture to stand on the site of New Bailey prison in Salford. There was opposition to the proposal, and it seems that the sculpture was never made, let alone installed. Dooley did however produce a foot-high maquette (a small concept sculpture) which now forms part of the collection of the Working Class Movement Library in Manchester. The maquette suggests that the memorial was to consist of a Wicklow granite base with three standing steel pillars with attached Celtic shields each bearing a martyr's name and some detail of the event's significance. The maquette was donated to the WCML in 2011 by the family of Jud Cooper who had been given the maquette by Dooley.

Police Sergeant Brett was buried in Harpurhey Cemetery; the words "I will do my duty" are engraved on his tombstone. There is also a memorial tablet to him in St Ann's Church, Manchester.
