= Dear Old Ireland =

Dear Old Ireland (also known as "Ireland Boys Hurrah!") is an Irish folk song of the nineteenth century. Its lyrics were written by nationalist politician and journalist Timothy Daniel Sullivan, who also wrote "God Save Ireland". First published in 1861 in Sullivan's collection Songs of the Backwoods, its nostalgic lyrics are about Irish emigrants living in Canada. This was an imagined setting, however, as Sullivan himself never lived in Canada, he did travel in North America fundraising for Irish nationalist causes. The tune accompanying it is a lively one in major chords, and this could easily be a drinking song. Part of the melody from this also was used in Eddie Cochran's 1950s song "Cherished Memories".

In a famous incident during the American Civil War, soldiers from both sides of the conflict joined together to sing the song from opposite banks of the Rappahannock River in Virginia.
