= Timothy Deasy =

Irish republican and Union Army officer (1839–1880)

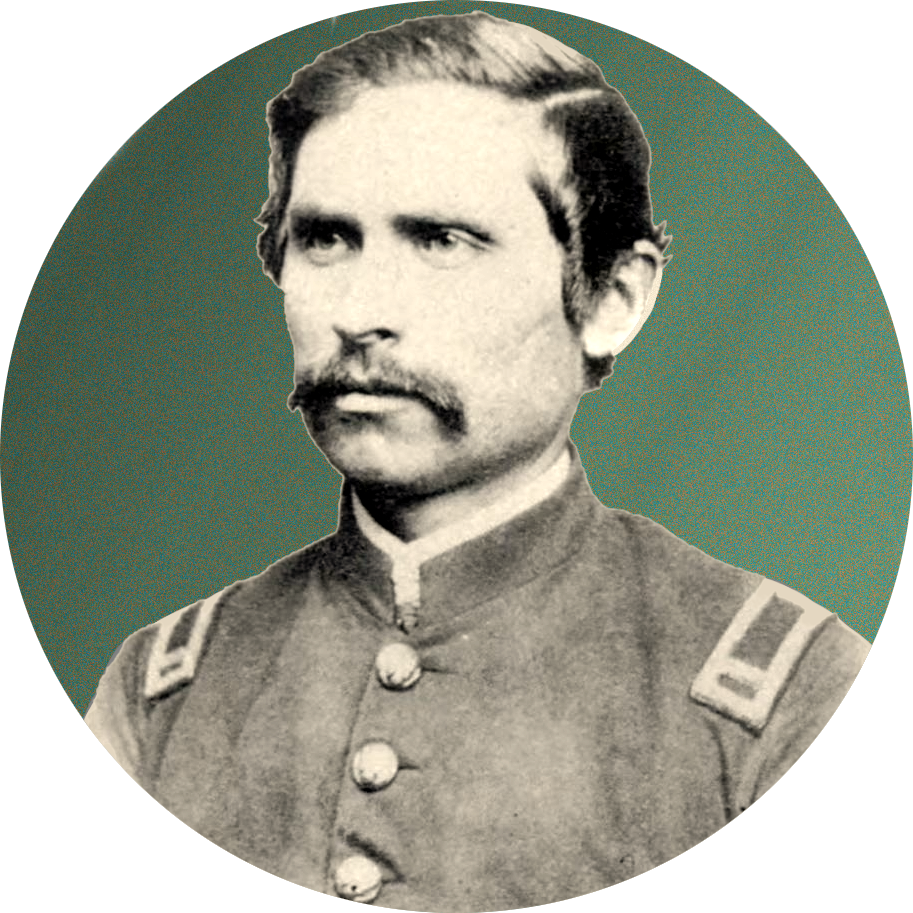
- Deasy in his military uniform c. 1865

Personal details
- Born: 20 February 1839 Farran, the Ring, Clonakilty, County Cork, Ireland
- Died: 18 December 1880 (aged 41) Lawrence, Massachusetts, US

Military service
- Allegiance: United States of America; Union; Irish Republican Brotherhood
- Branch/service: United States Army; Union Army
- Rank: Captain
- Unit: 9th Massachusetts Infantry Regiment
- Battles/wars: American Civil War: Battle of Gaines' Mill; Battle of the Wilderness; Fenian Raids on Canada: Battle of Fort Erie; Battle of Ridgeway; Fenian Rising of 1867

Timothy John Deasy (20 February 1839 – 18 December 1880) was an Irish survivor of the Great Famine who emigrated with his family to Massachusetts in the United States. He later became an officer in the Union Army during the American Civil War, as well as a revolutionary fighting alongside the Irish Republican Brotherhood in both Canada during the Fenian Raids and Ireland during the Fenian Rising of 1867. Towards the end of his life, he became involved in electoral politics in Massachusetts, becoming one of the few Roman Catholics elected at that time to the Massachusetts House of Representatives.

== Biography ==
=== Early life ===
Timothy Deasy was born in 1839 and was therefore old enough to experience, alongside his family and community, the devastating impact of the Great Famine in Ireland, which ravaged the land between 1845 and 1852. At the height of the famine in 1847, following the death of Timothy's younger sister Hanora, the Deasy family elected to immigrate to the United States in order to escape. They would eventually settle in Lawrence, Massachusetts.

Deasy's experience of the Great Famine left him with a deep-seated resentment against British rule in Ireland. Another influence that pointed Deasy towards Irish Nationalism was that his own father, Michael, had been a part of the Young Ireland movement before leaving Ireland. Although the Deasy family had left before it started, the Young Irelanders had launched a rebellion against the British in 1848, a revolt sometimes referred to as the "Famine Rebellion". Timothy's younger brother, Cornelius, was likewise influenced towards Irish Nationalism, and while in the United States, became involved in numerous Irish-American political and civic societies.

In 1857, both Timothy and Cornelius were sworn into the Fenian Brotherhood, the American wing of the Irish Republican Brotherhood. Both organisations, collectively referred to as "Fenians", were secret societies that sought the forcible overthrow of British rule in Ireland to allow for a democratic Irish Republic. Following his swearing-in, Timothy was assigned to recruiting and expanding the influence of the Fenians in Lawrence.

=== American Civil War ===
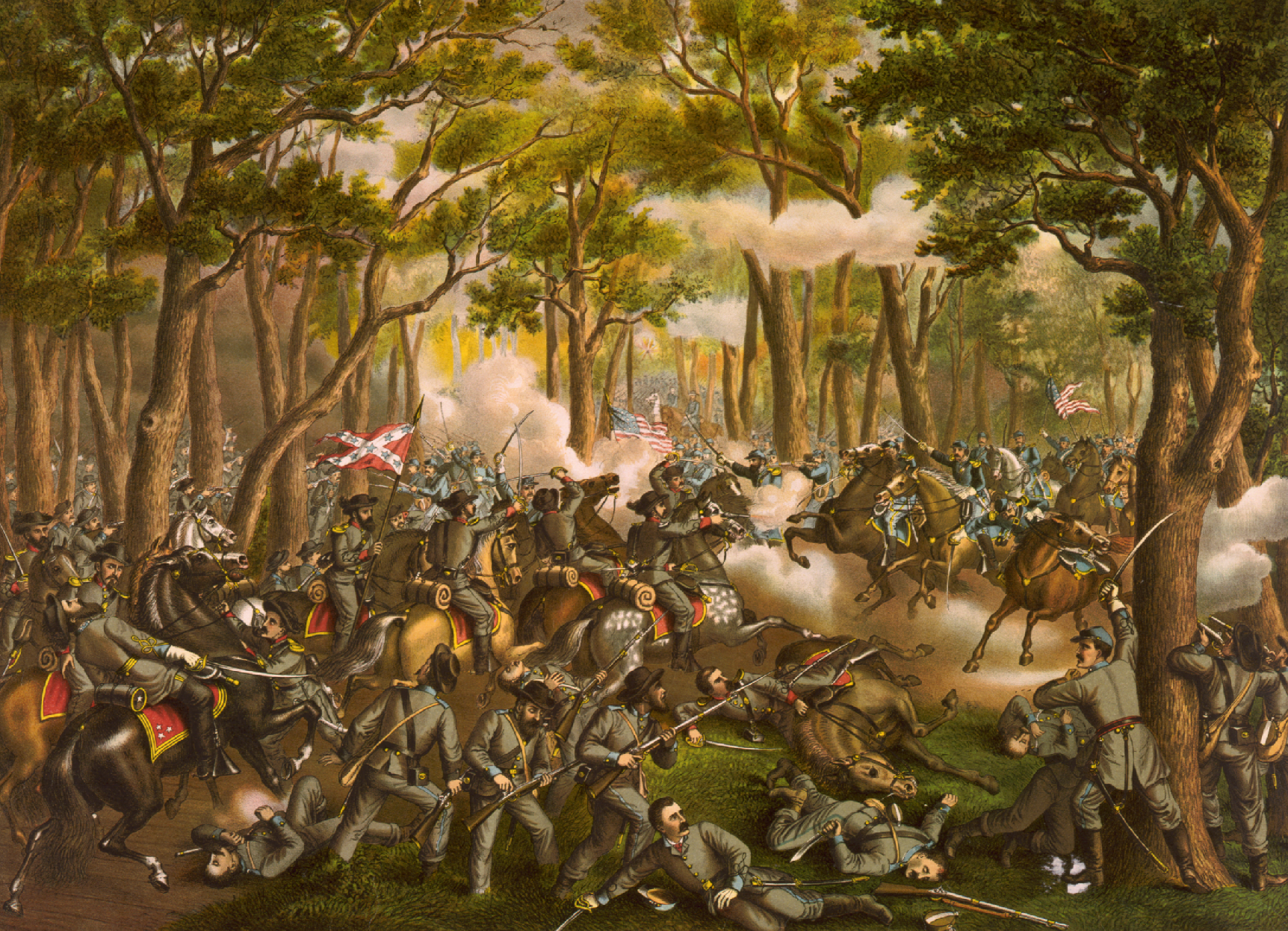
Both Deasy brothers were wounded in the desperate fighting that occurred during the Battle of the Wilderness

Upon the outbreak of the American Civil War, both Timothy and Cornelius were amongst the many thousands of Irish to volunteer for the Union Army. Timothy and Cornelius enlisted in June 1861 in Boston and were enrolled into Company I ("McLellan Rifles") of the 9th Massachusetts Infantry Regiment. In time, the regiment would become known as the "Fighting Ninth", and the Deasy brothers would see 32 engagements over the course of the war with the regiment. During the Battle of Gaines' Mill on 27 June 1862, the entirety of I Company's officers were killed. In response, Timothy was given a battlefield commission and made a captain, as well as being appointed company commander. Both Timothy and Cornelius ("Connie") were wounded in action during the Battle of the Wilderness in early May 1864, Connie on 5 May and Captain Deasy on 8 May. Timothy's injury was a severe head wound; however, as a company commander, he insisted on continuing to fight until the end of the day. It was only then that he received aid from the regimental doctor. The wound would develop into a scar Deasy would carry for the rest of his life.

The Deasy brothers mustered out of the Union Army on 21 June 1864.

=== Fenian activities ===
Deasy returned to his Fenian activities almost immediately. He attended a mass convention of the Irish Republican Brotherhood in Cincinnati, Ohio, in January 1865 and in August was one of 300 delegates to be selected by the organisation to be sent to Ireland to prepare the country for a rebellion. However, upon Deasy's arrival in Ireland, he was arrested in Skibereen in his home county of Cork, where he was found to be in possession of military-grade documents. Deasy was whisked away to a jail in England to be further integrated. Deasy was later released from custody on the condition that he return to the United States. Deasy promptly ignored that order and returned to Ireland post haste, and sent home to Clonakilty. There, Deasy received orders from Thomas J. Kelly, functionally the head organiser of the forthcoming rebellion. Kelly asked Deasy to report to Dublin. However, while there, Deasy was almost arrested again.

Kelly seemed suitably impressed enough with Deasy that he elected to bring him into the "Secret Circle", a cell within the IRB dedicated to the eradication of spies, informers and traitors within the movement. The "Secret Circle" was, predictably, despised by British authorities in Ireland, who were aware of its existence and derisively referred to as the "Irish American Assassination Company" or "the Shooting Circle". The capture of the Secret Circle was a top priority amongst the British.

On 4 November 1865, Deasy, alongside Kelly and John Devoy, was amongst a rescue party who broke the leader of the IRB, James Stephens, out of Richmond Gaol. Following that rescue, Deasy accompanied Kelly and Stephens over to France (where the Fenians had built a considerable support network) and then onwards back to the United States to rendezvous with the American Fenians in New York to report on their progress. From there, they once more travelled back to Ireland.

=== Fenian Raids on Canada ===
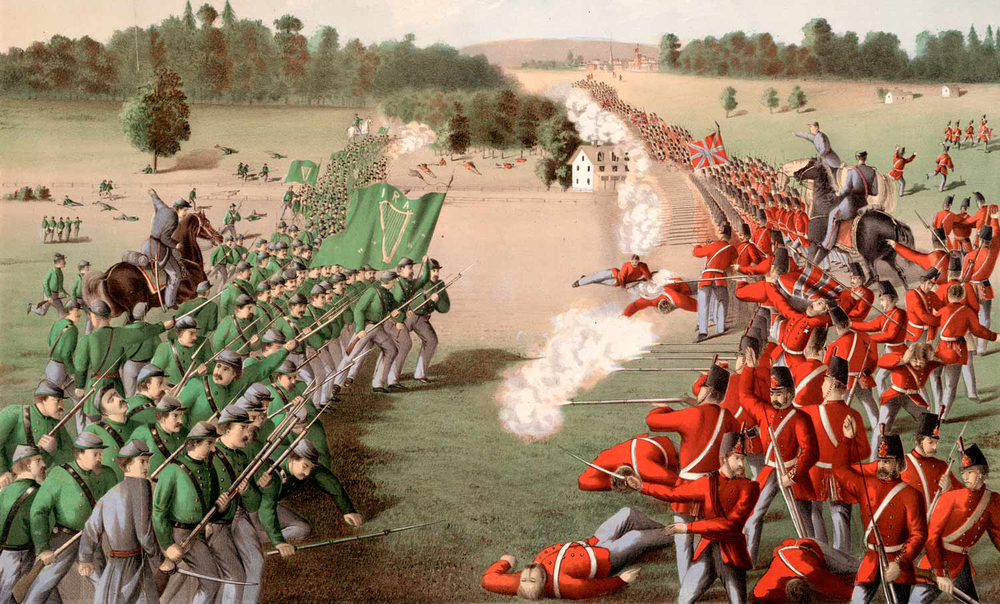
A depiction of the Battle of Ridgeway in which Deasy fought

By June 1866, the globetrotting Deasy (alongside his brother once more) was now on the Canadian border, where he participated in the Battle of Fort Erie. The raid was part of the Fenian Raids; a plan had emerged amongst one faction of the American Fenians that they should, rather than seeking to capture Ireland directly, they should muster as many veterans of the American Civil War as quickly as they could and seize the lightly defended Canada, which would then be exchanged back to the British for Ireland. The Battle of Fort Erie was a success, as was the following Battle of Ridgeway, with battle-hardened Fenian troops overcoming novice Canadian militias. Ridgeway saw the first-ever usage of the term "Irish Republican Army" as well as the first display of the Irish Tricolour flag. Despite these successes, the Fenians were soon forced to return to the United States after U.S. President Andrew Jackson issued a proclamation declaring that the US would oppose the Fenians in order to prevent the raids escalating into a war between the United States and the British Empire.

=== Fenian Rising in Ireland ===
In January 1867, Deasy once more returned to Ireland alongside American Civil War veterans Colonel Ricard O'Sullivan Burke of the 154th New York Engineers, Captain Michael O'Brien of the 13th New Jersey Light Artillery, and Captain John McCafferty of Morgan's Raiders, Confederate Cavalry.

On 11 February 1867, Deasy and Captain McCafferty were part of a Fenian raid on Chester Castle in England, which had the objective of securing weapons for a rebellion in Ireland. However, the raid had to be called off as the authorities had been tipped off. It soon emerged that the plan had been betrayed by an informer, John Joseph Corydon. Tensions were rising amongst the Fenians as the failure to secure weapons meant that plans to launch a rebellion in Ireland by February had to be pushed back to March.

Preceded by some skirmishes in February, the Fenian Rising had "properly" begun in March 1867, which Deasy sent to Millstreet in County Cork, where he was told to gather recruits and attack military and police buildings. He did this in parallel to Fenian commanders doing so across the country as well. However, the rising never truly "took off" as the British had long been aware of the coming danger and responded quickly to suppress it. By the end of March, any semblance of a Fenian rebellion had already been snuffed out.

=== Second-in-Command of the IRB ===
Following the crushing of the rebellion, Deasy, like many other Fenians, would have gone to ground to avoid capture and waited for their next move. Thomas Kelly was not long in attempting to reorganise the Fenians after their defeat. Kelly envisioned that the next phase of Fenian resistance to British rule should come from within England itself, and ordered his remaining officers to meet him there. Amongst other roles doled out, Deasy was named Commander of Manchester and Liverpool, two cities with significant Irish populations. In September 1867, Kelly held a Fenian conference in Manchester to discuss the future of the Fenian movement and its new campaign in England. Amongst other events at that conference, Kelly was named the clear leader of the IRB (in succession to James Stephens). Kelly also made clear he wanted to move the IRB away from the Fenian Brotherhood, which he viewed as having become too divided by infighting, and towards Clan na Gael, a new organisation also based in New York City. Finally, besides Kelly becoming the clear number one within the IRB, Kelly named Deasy as his aide-de-camp and deputy, effectively naming him second-in-command of the organisation. The historical author Joseph O'Neill wrote of the situation, "Deasy was Kelly's ideal second in command, and the Fenian leader was delighted with his appointment. They shared the same formative experiences and inhabited the same mental world. They could sit in silence knowing exactly what the other was thinking."

=== The Manchester Martyrs ===
On 11 September 1867, Deasy and Kelly were travelling to another meeting in Manchester City when it became apparent the pair were being followed by the British authorities. They were eventually arrested and charged with loitering so that they could be held for a prolonged amount of time. Kelly and Deasy gave their names as "Mr. Wright" and "Mr. Williams", but they were eventually identified after a number of days, at which point they were charged with their involvement with the Fenian Rising. However, their delay tactics had bought them time, and their arrest was known amongst the Irish community in Manchester.

A plan to rescue them was made by Edward O'Meagher Condon with other Manchester Fenians. On 18 September 1867, while Kelly and Deasy were being driven through the city from the courthouse with four other prisoners, Fenians armed with revolvers attacked the prison van. During the scuffle, police sergeant Charles Brett, who was seated inside the van, was accidentally shot dead – the leaders of the 30-plus Fenian force called on him to open the door, and he refused. He then looked through the keyhole just as one of the rescuers blew the lock off; the shot killed him. One of the women prisoners in the van then took the keys from his belt and passed them to the Fenians, who unlocked the van and rushed Deasy and Kelly away.

A reward of £300 (£24,000 as of 2015) was offered, without result.

Deasy and Kelly were sheltered by the network of revolutionaries in Manchester, reputedly including Frederick Engels and his Irish partner Lizzie Burns. Deasy managed to eventually board a ship which took him directly to New York City, while Kelly disguised himself as a Franciscan friar and travelled back to Galway to visit his mother, before himself taking a ship back to New York.

The escape of the Fenian leaders and the death of a police officer caused outrage and mass embarrassment amongst the British authorities, and they turned to scapegoats for retribution. Dozens of Manchester Irish were arrested and thrown into jail. Three of the Fenian rescuers, William Philip Allen, Michael Larkin, and Michael O'Brien, were arrested after a massive manhunt and later executed after a swift trial followed by many appeals. Their execution was badly bungled and widely reported. Their cause was taken up worldwide and was one of the foundations of Irish revolutionary success of the early 20th century. The three are remembered as the Manchester Martyrs.

=== Return to Massachusetts and entering electoral politics ===
Deasy finally returned home to Lawrence by 1870, having effectively been gone for a decade. Reunited with his brother Connie, the two set up a number of businesses such as a saloon, a liquor dealership, a hotel, and a number of rental properties. In 1872, Deasy successfully ran for Lawrence City Council and won re-election in '74. Deasy owed his success to the population of 8,200 Irish living in Lawrence by 1875, who accounted for almost half of the population. The Irish were becoming a powerful force in New England politics, and the Democratic Party moved to capitalise. A group of Irish community leaders and Democrats came to Deasy to ask him to run for the Massachusetts House of Representatives. Deasy agreed, and it was determined that John Breen, who had fought with Deasy in Canada, would serve as his replacement on the Lawrence city council. This gave Breen much political momentum, and Breen would later become the first Irish and first Roman Catholic to become Mayor of any city in New England.

Deasy was elected to the 1874 Massachusetts legislature and would serve there the following two years as well. Only 13 members of the entire 213-member legislature were Irish in 1876, and Deasy was the only Irish Catholic to be elected from Essex County out of 33.

=== Falling ill and death ===
In June 1878 the end of July 1878, Deasy was a patient at the Massachusetts General Hospital in Boston suffering from excruciating pain caused by rheumatoid arthritis. likely to have developed from sleeping on the cold, wet ground during his service in the Civil War. His condition forced him out of the busy world of politics, although he did make one more notable public political appearance when he hosted Charles Stewart Parnell at a fundraiser at Lawrence city hall in early 1880.

Deasy took ill again on 9 December 1880 and died the following day. He was given an elaborate funeral that was attended en masse by Lawrence's Irish community, Fenians and veterans of the Union Army, with members of the 9th Massachusetts Infantry Regiment particularly in force. Deasy is buried at the Immaculate Conception Cemetery in Lawrence, Massachusetts. The Irish National Graves Association, in Dublin, Ireland, designated the grave of Deasy an Irish National Grave on 16 August 1990. Deasy received a new green granite headstone on his grave on 23 November 1992, the dedication organized by Bob Bateman, great-grandson of Timothy's brother Cornelius. The principal speaker for the dedications was Derek Warfield of the Wolfe Tones.

His headstone reads:

Patriot ~ Irish ~ American

Born in County Cork, Ireland, February 20, 1839. He fought oppression, tyranny, and foreign domination on the battlefields of three nations. As a member of the Lawrence City Council and Massachusetts House of Representatives, he was a man to whom the Irish looked for leadership, action and direction as a soldier, statesman, businessman.

Fenian Captain Timothy Deasy served his country, homeland, state and city well.
