= Thomas J. Kelly (Irish nationalist) =

Irish nationalist (1833–1908)

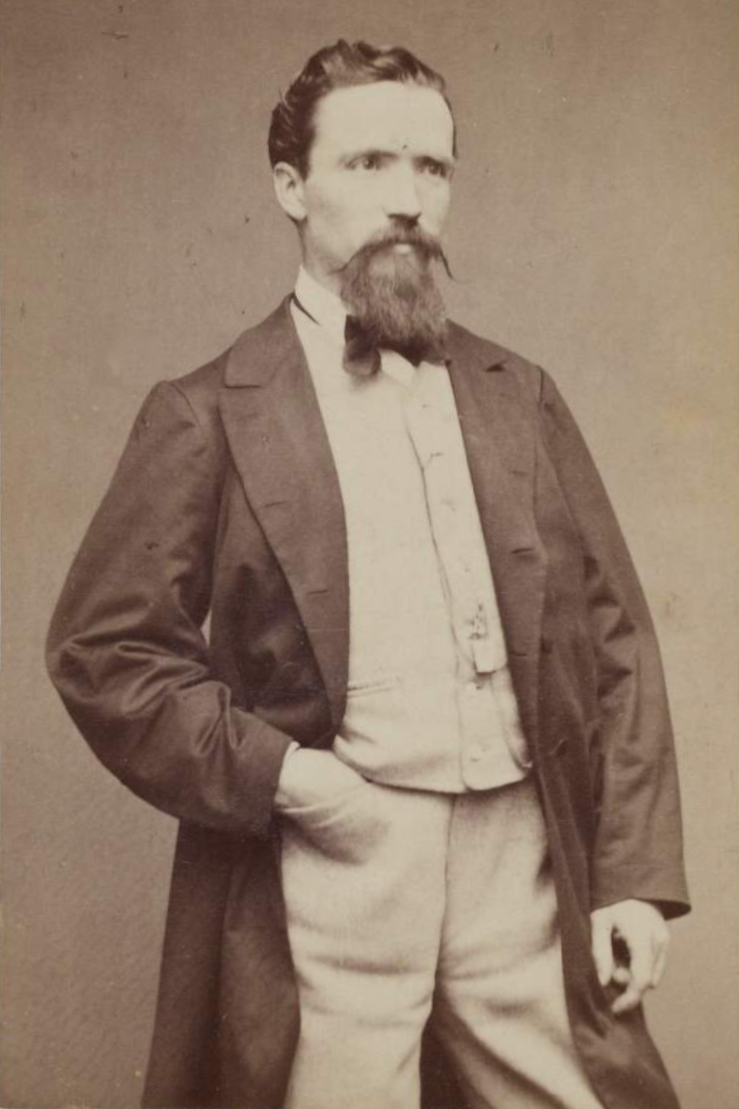
- Kelly, c. 1865

President of the Irish Republican Brotherhood
- In office August 1866 – c. 1869
- Preceded by: James Stephens
- Succeeded by: J. F. X. O'Brien

Personal details
- Born: 6 January 1833 Mountbellew, County Galway, Ireland
- Died: 5 February 1908 (aged 75) 331 East 119th Street, New York City
- Resting place: Woodlawn Cemetery in the Bronx, New York City
- Occupation: Soldier, Journalist

Military service
- Allegiance: Union
- Branch/service: US Army
- Rank: Captain (Union Army); Colonel (IRB)
- Unit: 10th Ohio Infantry "The Bloody 10th"
- Battles/wars: American Civil War: Battle of Carnifex Ferry; Fenian Rising of 1867

Thomas Joseph Kelly (6 January 1833 – 5 February 1908) was an Irish revolutionary and leader of the Irish Republican Brotherhood (IRB), a secret organisation with the objective of establishing an Irish republic independent from the United Kingdom. Kelly was the nominal leader of the failed Fenian Rising of 1867. He had previously also been an officer in the Union Army during the American Civil War, serving mainly with the 10th Ohio Infantry "The Bloody 10th".

== Biography ==
=== Early life ===
The son of a farmer and public house owner, Patrick Kelly, and Margaret Divilly, Thomas Joseph Kelly was born in Mountbellew, County Galway, in 1833. Having received a better than average education, it was originally intended that he should become a priest and attended St. Jarlath's College in Tuam. At school, he came to be influenced by his teacher Michael Joseph MacCann (1824–1883) who, in 1843, wrote "O'Donnell Abu", a ballad about Rory O'Donnell, 1st Earl of Tyrconnell. This influence kindled patriotism in Kelly.

== Emigration to the United States ==
After serving an apprenticeship in the printing trade in Loughrea, at the age of eighteen, he emigrated to New York City, arriving on the ship Castillian on 27 March 1851, where he worked as a printer, and joined the Printer's Union in New York City. He joined the National Guard in New York and received basic military training. He later joined the Emmet Monument Association, an Irish-American Irish republican group.

In 1857, Kelly went to Nashville, Tennessee, where he worked as a foreman for the S. W. Publishing House. Soon afterwards he started the Nashville Democrat, which supported the presidential campaign of Stephen A. Douglas in the Presidential election of 1860. Following the outbreak of the American Civil War, Kelly, a supporter of the Union, chose to leave Nashville for the North. In doing this, he lost his savings and printing business.

== American Civil War ==
En route to join the famous Irish 69th Infantry Regiment, he heard about the Irish 10th Ohio Infantry, and enlisted with them for its initial three months, and then re-enlisted for an additional three years. He served in Company "C", where his military knowledge and ability was soon recognized and he was promoted to sergeant. By the end of the summer of 1861 he was functioning as first sergeant of Company "C". Although shot in the jaw at the Battle of Carnifex Ferry in Western Virginia, 10 September 1861, he volunteered to return to duty before the end of the year. Part of his jaw and three teeth were destroyed by a bullet that lodged in the muscles of the left side of his neck, from which it was removed surgically. It has been suggested that the goatee beard, which appears in all of his pictures was grown to hide what could have been a disfiguring scar.

Kelly was commissioned in January 1862, and later seconded to the staff of Major General George Henry Thomas (later "The Rock of Chickamauga") of the XIV Corps, United States Army of the Cumberland, as a Signal Officer. He was promoted to captain on 17 March 1863, becoming Chief Signal Officer. During this period his regimental commander requested his reassignment back to the 10th Ohio, in order that he might take command of one of the regiment's manoeuvre battalions. General Thomas refused the request, writing that he could not spare Kelly from his duties. On 30 April 1863, Kelly was administratively transferred, on the books of the 10th Ohio from Company "C" to Company "I", while continuing to serve at XIV Corps Headquarters. General Thomas's need for Kelly's services was trumped by a new Army regulation requiring that all officers of the Signal Corps have university degrees by the following February. This being the case (although too late for battalion command), Kelly again requested transfer back to his regiment. On 19 August 1863 he was ordered to return to the "Bloody Tenth" as Captain, Company "I", from which he was mustered out with the rest of the 10th Ohio on 17 June 1864.

== Irish Republican Brotherhood ==
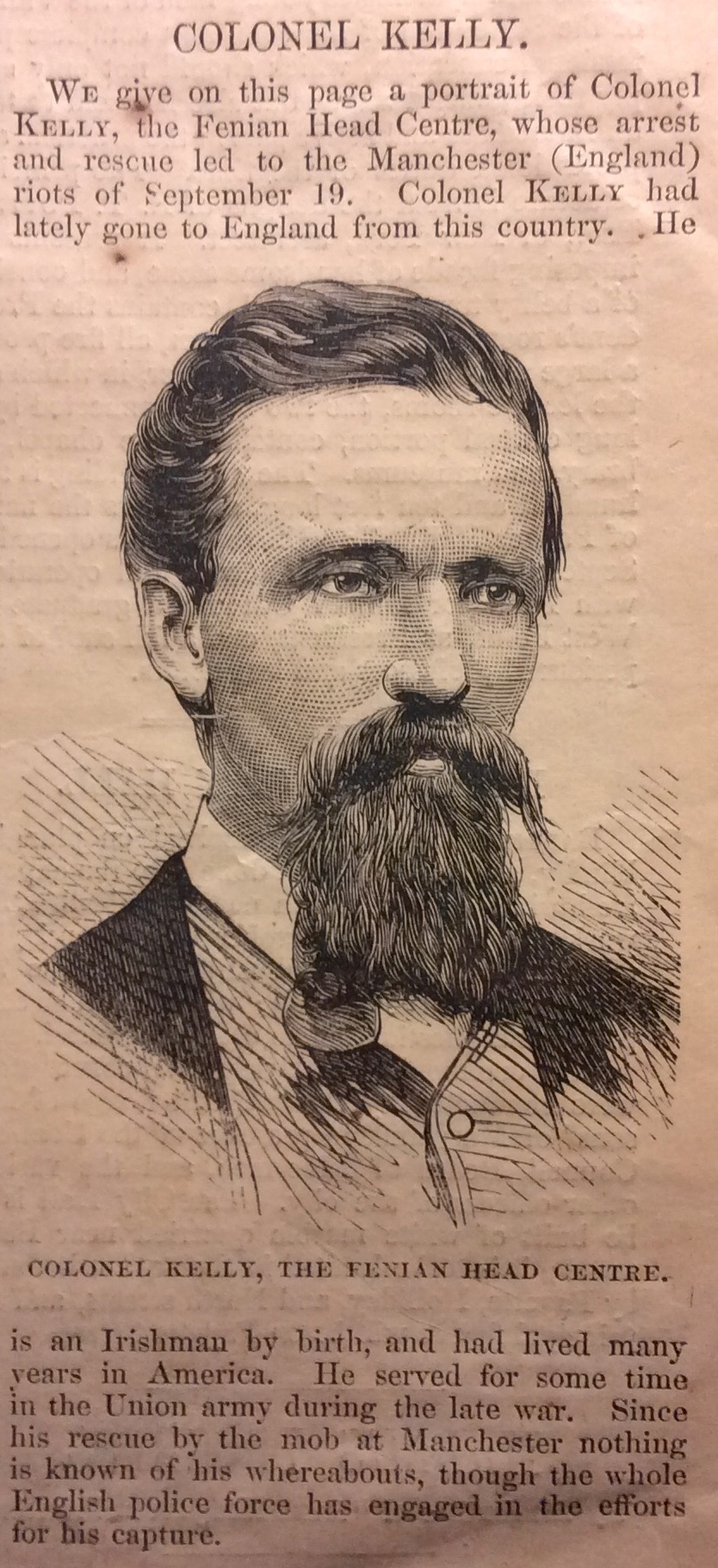
A wanted ad for Kelly in Harper's Weekly

After the end of the war, Kelly learned about the establishment of the Irish Republican Brotherhood (IRB) and joined the movement in New York. Kelly's military experience immediately made him of value to the organisation. The Fenian Brotherhood quickly dispatched him to Ireland in April 1865 to inspect the military capability of the IRB there. Kelly's valuable reports back to HQ led the IRB to "promote" Kelly to Colonel within the IRB. Kelly's authority continued to grow when, on 24 November 1865, he was able to arrange the rescue of IRB President James Stephens from Richmond Prison in Dublin. Following this, Kelly became Stephen's deputy and intermediary between Stephens and the American Fenians.

In September 1865, the Dublin Castle administration suppressed publication of The Irish People, a Fenian run newspaper and its staff. This deprived the IRB of most of its American advisors in Ireland, with the exception of Kelly and William G. Halpin. Halpin was a fellow Irishman who had also settled in Ohio and had also served in the Union Army, and together the two sat on the IRB's "Military Council". Following the bust-up of The Irish People, two plans emerged within the IRB. The first, proposed by John Devoy, would see the IRB attempt to capture important military targets in and around Dublin City using local recruits and deserters from the British Armed Forces. Kelly did not favour this plan as he felt the IRB did not have enough access to weaponry, although Kelly hoped to secure more arms from Liverpool having sent Ricard O'Sullivan Burke there to acquire them. The second plan was Halpin's, who proposed a general rebellion across the country. As Halpin had outranked Kelly in the Union Army, his plan gained traction within the IRB without necessarily receiving an official endorsement.

In March 1866 Kelly travelled with Stephens first to Paris, and then New York by May. By the time they arrived a split had occurred amongst the American Fenians. Stephens demanded the American Fenians provide him with the funds necessary to carry out a rebellion in Ireland, but they would not agree and ceased to work with him. This caused the Presidency of the IRB to be turned over to Kelly, who was then sent back to Ireland to take command there and lead the proposed rebellion.

=== Leading the Fenian Rising of 1867 ===
By January 1867 Kelly was operating out of London. The plan was now to launch Halpin's general rebellion by March. The hope was that the IRB could launch a guerilla war which would then be supplemented by American aid. On 11 February 1867 Kelly ordered a raid on Chester Castle in England, with the objective of securing arms for the rebellion, this action had to be aborted.

Within days of the raid on Chester Castle, armed skirmishes began to be carried out by Fenians across Munster. By early March, small uprisings started around Dublin too and Kelly sent a proclamation of an Irish Republic to the press. However, these actions were sporadic and their impacts were limited; when it became apparent that the co-ordinated rising that had been planned was not transpiring, most rebels simply went home. The rising failed as a result of lack of arms and planning, but also because of the British authorities' effective use of informers, as most of the Fenian leadership had been arrested before the rebellion took place. O’Sullivan Burke's promised shipment of arms from Liverpool did arrive in Ireland, but the time they had the rising had already effectively been put down.

By July it was evident the rising had died before it ever truly started. In response, the IRB met in secret in August in Manchester and considered forming a new supreme council which would continue to act as a "Provisional Government-in-exile". Both the idea of proclaiming an Irish Republic and forming provisional governments would be influential upon later proponents of Irish Republicanism. Although the Provisional government idea was not truly acted upon, Kelly was formally recognised as the President of the IRB and successor of James Stephens.

=== Arrest and escape to the US ===
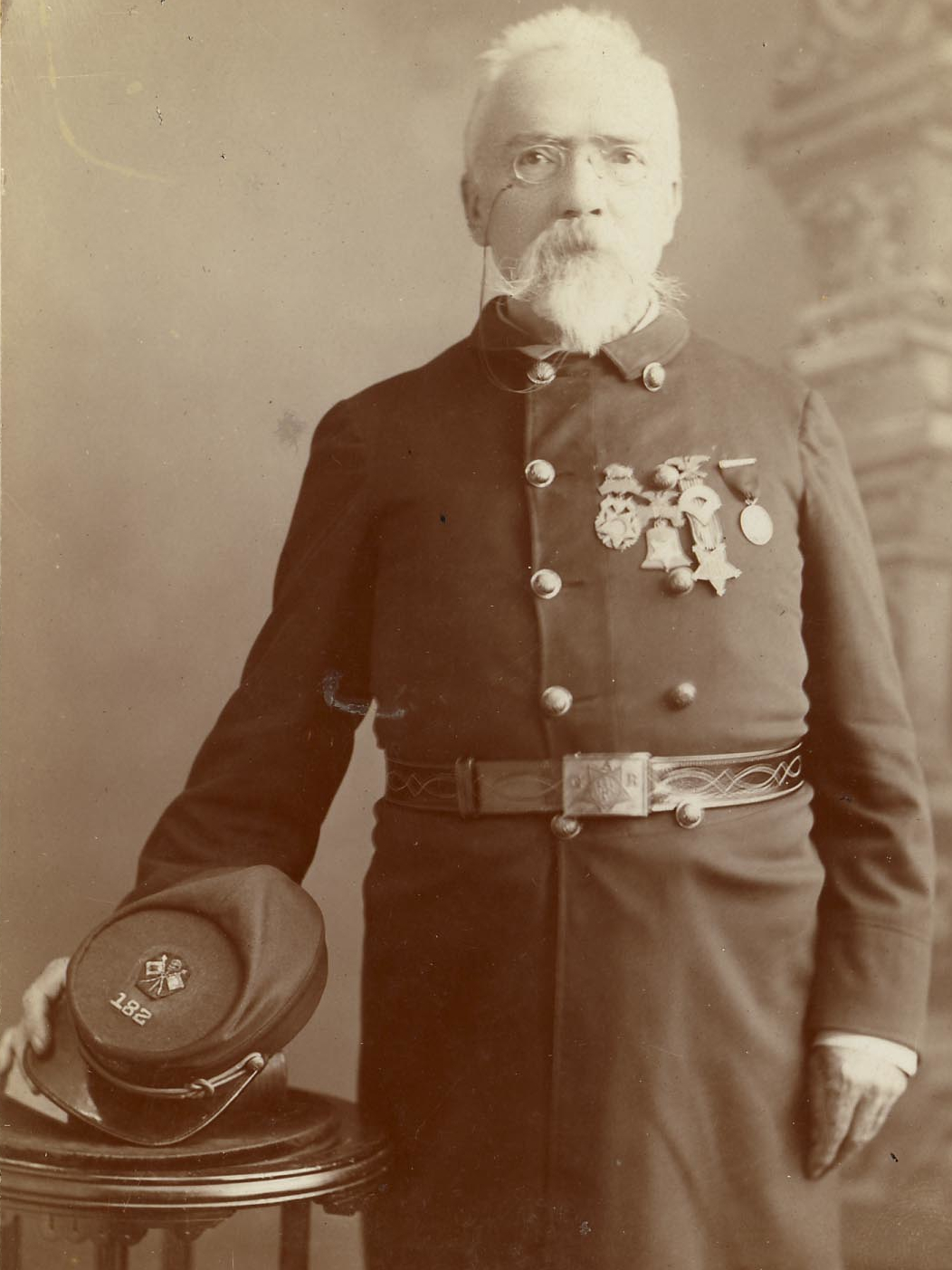
Kelly as an older man, dressed in his Union Army officer's uniform

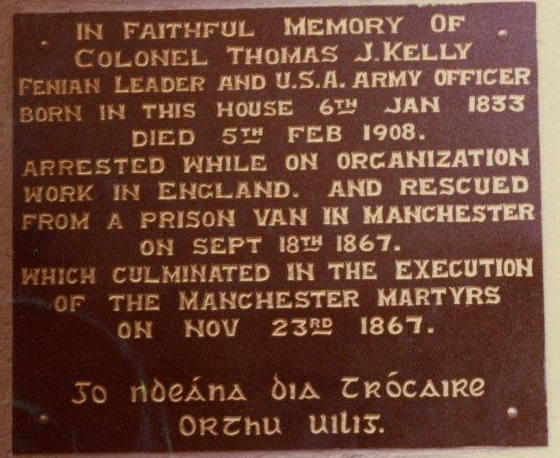
Memorial plaque in Mountbellew

Kelly was wanted by the British authorities, and for a time managed to evade capture. But on 11 September 1867, Kelly, along with Timothy Deasy, was arrested in Manchester for loitering. Though they gave their names as Martin Williams and John Whyte, they were soon identified and charged with more serious offences. Seven days later, Kelly and Deasy were being transferred from the courthouse to the county jail on Hyde Road, Manchester, when about thirty supporters attempted to free them. During the attack, police sergeant Charles Brett, was killed, but Kelly and Deasy managed to escape. Three men arrested in connection with the attack were later executed, and thereafter known as the Manchester Martyrs. Both Kelly and Deasy escaped to the United States and were never recaptured. Kelly later obtained employment in the New York Custom House.

Following Kelly's return to New York, he continued to associate with the Irish Republican Brotherhood but did not seek the same prominence he once had. In 1871, he was secretary to the committee which welcomed the "Cuba Five", a group of released Fenian prisoners, to New York.

In 1869 Kelly married Catharine Gillogly, a native of Ohio with whom he had five children. Catharine died in 1891, and Kelly would go on to marry her sick nurse Anna Dunne in 1891, with whom he had two further daughters.

Kelly was active in Union veteran circles as a member of the Alexander Hamilton Chapter of the Grand Army of the Republic. After his death, the New York State Senate posthumously awarded him a Liberty Medal, its highest honour, in recognition of his past work for the US armed services.

Kelly died at his residence, 31 East 130th Street in New York, on 5 February 1908. He and his second wife, Anna Frances (née Dunne) (May 1860 – September 1913) are buried in Woodlawn Cemetery in the Bronx, New York City. In 1967, on the centenary of the Fenian Rising, a commemorative plaque was placed at Kelly's ancestral home in Mountbellew.

Other offices
Preceded by James Stephens	President of the Irish Republican Brotherhood; 1866–1867	Succeeded by J. F. X. O'Brien
