= Charles Brett (police officer) =

British police officer (1815-1867)

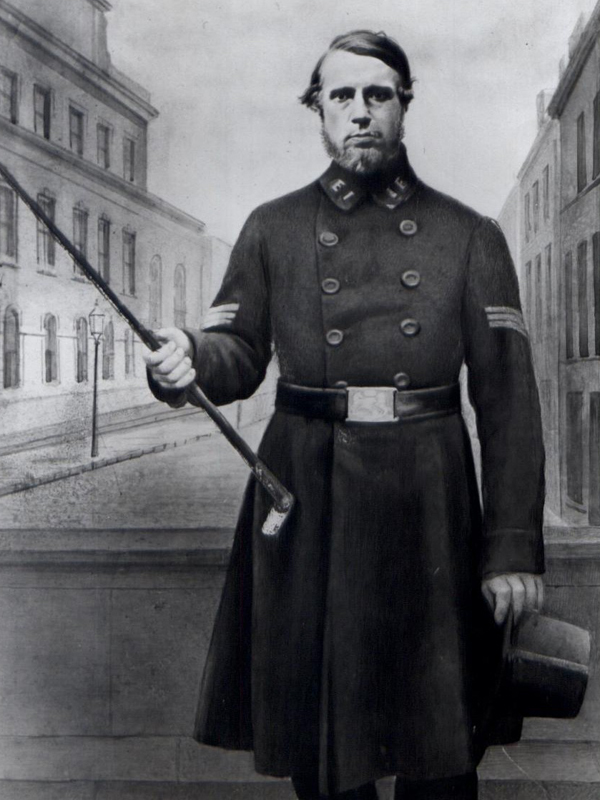
- Brett in the 1860s
- Born: Unknown date, c. 1815; Macclesfield, England
- Died: 18 September 1867 (aged 52); Manchester, England
- Resting place: Manchester General Cemetery
- Occupation: Police sergeant

Charles Brett (c. 1815 – 18 September 1867) was a police sergeant from Manchester, England. In 1867, he was shot dead in an ambush on the locked police carriage transporting the Fenians Thomas J. Kelly and Timothy Deasy; he was the first police officer from Manchester to be killed on duty.

== History ==
Brett was born in Macclesfield, Cheshire, to Mary and William Brett, who both worked in the clothing industry. Brett followed them into the industry, and at the time of the 1841 Census was working as a weaver. In 1830, he had married a woman named Mary. They had four children: William, Mary, Charles and Elizabeth. The Manchester City Police force came into existence after the passing of the County Police Act 1839. With his family, he moved from Macclesfield to Manchester about 1847 and his police career began then; his youngest daughter was born in Manchester in 1850. In 1861, he was living at 7 Wilson Street. At the time of his death, Brett had had a lot of experience accompanying prisoners to jail in secure transports.

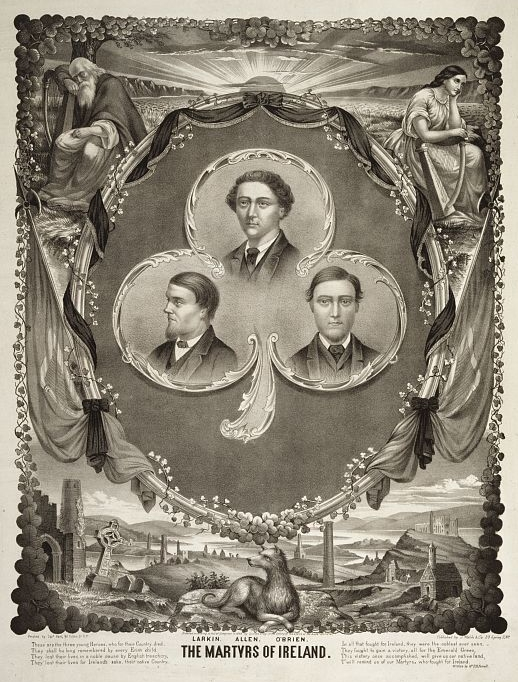
Three Manchester Martyrs of 1867; Left to right: Larkin, Allan, Michael O'Brien

Thomas Kelly, the new leader of the Irish Republican Brotherhood, had been arrested in Manchester with Timothy Deasy under the Vagrancy Act in the small hours of 11 September 1867. Suspected of being robbers, they were found to be armed and information was later passed from Dublin which established their identity. A magistrate directed that they be remanded in custody. An escape plan was arranged by Ricard O'Sullivan Burke, an Irish veteran of the American Civil War. On 18 September, Brett was with a horse-drawn police van; he was one of a dozen police officers transferring prisoners from Court to Belle Vue Gaol in Manchester. Kelly and Deasy were in locked compartments separated from the other prisoners. A group of Fenians armed with an assortment of firearms and cudgels surrounded the carriage at the bridge over Hyde Road near the jail. One - James Cahill - shot a horse dead in order to stop the carriage. The officers were overwhelmed: one was reported wounded by a bullet, as was a passer-by. Attempts by the attackers to lever open the door failed. They called to Brett inside the van, demanding the keys. The words of reply, "I dare not. I must do my duty," were later attributed to Brett (and were inscribed on his gravestone). Peter Rice, another of the ambush group, fired through the keyhole of the lock; this was in order to break it, according to a police witness, Constable Shaw. The bullet passed through Brett's eye into his skull, killing him. Rice still could not open the door. The keys were then handed out through the window of the carriage by one of the prisoners inside. Kelly and Deasy were released. Alternative contemporary journalistic reports describe Fenians trying to gain entry through the roof of the van by smashing at the wood with a rock that had been passed up, with Brett then confronted by William Allen (later executed) who shot him above the eye, the bullet exiting the top of his skull. In other witness testimony in court, a frustrated Allen fired through the roof ventilator, a prisoner shouted "He's killed!", the keys were passed out and Brett fell out dead once the door was opened; a further witness claimed Brett was not yet dead, despite his mortal wound. Newspapers heavily criticised the authorities for ordering the movement of the prisoners unnecessarily with unarmed policemen when they had been warned of an ambush.

In the ensuing police crackdown, many people, mostly Irish, were targeted for arrest. A £300 reward (approximately £25,000 in 2019) for information aiding the recapture of Kelly and Deasy went unclaimed. Various terms of imprisonment were handed down. Five people were sentenced to death but three, William Allen, Michael Larkin and Michael O’Brien, were executed - the last people in Manchester to be - and became known as the Manchester Martyrs amongst Irish nationalists; they had taken part in the ambush but Rice - the shooter (in Court, Allen was accused of firing the fatal shot) - Kelly and Deasy all escaped to live in the U.S.A. Burke - the organiser - was later arrested on a separate issue and spent four years of a fifteen-year sentence in jail. Despite the initial outrage and some clear prejudice, the process and result of the trials was reported as unsatisfactory to an impartial observer.

== Legacy ==
Brett's funeral was very prominent, attended by the mayor, councillors, aldermen, firemen and about 400 police officers from different divisions; the cortège was a third of a mile long, containing over thirty carriages and ran for two miles, witnessed by thousands. The Manchester General Cemetery in Harpurhey was so full it had to be closed so that the family and deceased would be able to access the grave. Brett was survived by his father, wife and children. Mary Brett was awarded 21 shillings weekly for life and the Brett's children £300 upon her death. The Manchester Police and other contributors commissioned a separate wall-mounted marble memorial to Brett inside St. Barnabas' Church, Ancoats, where Brett worshipped. It was moved to St Ann's Church, Manchester, upon the closure of St. Barnabas' in 1959.

== Notes ==
1.1861 Census, RG9/2931, Registration district: Manchester, Subregistration district: Ancoats, Enumeration district: 22, page 34
