= Belle Vue Gaol =

Victorian prison in Gorton, Manchester, England

Coordinates: 53.463°N 2.195°W

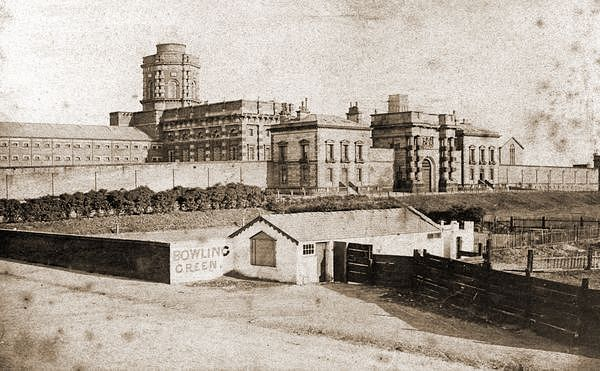
Belle Vue Gaol c. 1870

Belle Vue Gaol (also known as Manchester City Gaol, Manchester Borough Gaol or Gorton Gaol) was a Victorian prison in Gorton, Manchester, England. It operated between 1850 and 1888. It was notorious at the time for abysmal prisoner living conditions. It was demolished in 1892.

== Purpose ==
When the building of the jail, located near Hyde Road, commenced circa 1845 it was intended to have been a short-term prison housing male and female inmates who were serving sentences of no more than six months. However, there are prison records that show that there were a few prisoners, mainly military prisoners, usually deserters, who were imprisoned there for up to two years. There were also facilities for securing prisoners awaiting trial at the Assize Court (after July 1864) in Manchester and the Quarter Sessions located nearby. The jail was considered to be inadequate and as a result many other prisoners were sent to the New Bailey Prison in Salford.

== Notable former inmates ==
- George Gissing, novelist
