= 2025 Antrim Senior Hurling Championship =

Annual hurling competition season

- Dates: 8 August - 19 October 2025
- Teams: 8
- Sponsor: Bathshack
- Champions: St John's (8th title); Ciaran Johnston (captain); Gerard Cunningham (manager)
- Runners-up: Loughgiel Shamrocks; Tiernan Coyle (captain)

Tournament statistics
- Matches played: 17
- Goals scored: 68 (4 per match)
- Points scored: 650 (38.24 per match)

The 2025 Antrim Senior Hurling Championship was the 125th staging of the Antrim Senior Hurling Championship since its establishment by the Antrim County Board in 1901. The draw for the group stage placings took place on 16 May 2025. The championship ran from 9 August to October 2025.

RuairÍ Óg, Cushendall entered the championship as the defending champions, however, they were beaten by St John's in the semi-finals.

The final was played on 19 October 2025 at Páirc Mac Uílín in Ballycastle, between St John's and Loughgiel Shamrocks, in what was their third meeting in the final overall and a first meeting in 36 years. St John's won the match by 2–16 to 1–18 to claim their eighth championship title overall and a first title in 52 years.

== Team changes ==
=== To Championship ===
Promoted from the Antrim Intermediate Hurling Championship

- Carey Faughs

== Group 1 ==
=== Group 1 table ===
Semi-finalist Quarter-finalist

| Team | Matches | | | | Score | | | Pts |
| Team | Pld | W | D | L | For | Against | Diff | Pts |
|---|---|---|---|---|---|---|---|---|
| RuairÍ Óg | 3 | 3 | 0 | 0 | 102 | 58 | 44 | 6 |
| Loughgiel Shamrocks | 3 | 2 | 0 | 1 | 100 | 64 | 36 | 4 |
| O'Donovan Rossa | 3 | 1 | 0 | 2 | 84 | 76 | 8 | 2 |
| Carey Faughs | 3 | 0 | 0 | 3 | 50 | 138 | -88 | 0 |

=== Group 1 results ===
| 8 August 2025 Round 1 | Loughgiel Shamrocks | 6-26 - 1-13 | Carey Faughs | St Patrick's Park |

| 9 August 2025 Round 1 | O'Donovan Rossa | 1-18 - 2-17 | RuairÍ Óg | Páirc Rossa |

| 23 August 2025 Round 2 | O'Donovan Rossa | 3-18 - 4-25 | Loughgiel Shamrocks | Dunsilly Pitch 1 |

| 24 August 2025 Round 2 | Carey Faughs | 0-18 - 10-28 | RuairÍ Óg | Fr Maginn Park |

| 7 September 2025 Round 3 | Carey Faughs | 1-13 - 2-30 | O'Donovan Rossa | St Patrick's Park |

| 7 September 2025 Round 3 | RuairÍ Óg | 2-15 - 0-19 | Loughgiel Shamrocks | Páirc Mhuire |

== Group 2 ==
=== Group 2 table ===
Semi-finalist Quarter-finalist

| Team | Matches | | | | Score | | | Pts |
| Team | Pld | W | D | L | For | Against | Diff | Pts |
|---|---|---|---|---|---|---|---|---|
| Cúchulains Dunloy | 3 | 3 | 0 | 0 | 82 | 57 | 25 | 6 |
| St John's | 3 | 1 | 1 | 1 | 82 | 86 | -4 | 3 |
| McQuillan's | 3 | 1 | 0 | 2 | 76 | 87 | -11 | 2 |
| St Enda's | 3 | 0 | 1 | 2 | 67 | 77 | -10 | 1 |

=== Group 2 results ===
| 19 August 2025 Round 1 | St Enda's | 2-18 - 0-24 | St John's | Páirc Éanna |

| 19 August 2025 Round 1 | Cúchulainns Dunloy | 3-20 - 1-11 | Ballycastle McQuillans | Pearse Park |

| 22 August 2025 Round 2 | St Enda's | 2-19 - 1-27 | Cúchulainns Dunloy | Dunsilly Pitch 1 |

| 24 August 2025 Round 2 | Ballycastle McQuillans | 2-18 - 2-24 | St John's | Pearse Park |

| 6 September 2025 Round 3 | Ballycastle McQuillans | 1-20 - 1-15 | St Enda's | Páirc Mac Uílín |

| 6 September 2025 Round 3 | St John's | 3-19 - 5-23 | Cúchulainns Dunloy | Corrigan Park |

== Knockout stage ==
=== Quarter-finals ===
| 20 September 2025 Quarter-final | O'Donovan Rossa | 0-20 - 2-15 | St John's | Páirc Éanna |

| 21 September 2025 Quarter-final | Loughgiel Shamrocks | 1-20 - 0-11 | Ballycastle McQuillans | Pearse Park |

=== Semi-finals ===
| 4 October 2025 Semi-final | Ruairí Óg | 1-22 - 1-26 | St John's | Dunsilly Pitch 1 |
| | | Report |

| 5 October 2025 Semi-final | Cúchulains Dunloy | 2-23 - 3-21 | Loughgiel Shamrocks | Páirc Mhuire |
| | | Report |

=== Final ===
| 19 October 2025 Final | St John's | 2-16 - 1-18 | Loughgiel Shamrocks | Páirc Mac Uílín |
| | S Shannon 0-5 (4fs), O McManus 1-2, C Johnston 0-4, A Bradley 0-2, D Nugent 0-1 (f), C Bohill 0-1, D Carson 1-0, M Dudley 0-1. | Report | J McNaughton 0-10 (0-8f, 0-1 65’), S McGrath 1-1, C O’Hagan 0-2 (2fs), R McCormick 0-1, R McMullan 0-1. |
