= 2023 Antrim Senior Hurling Championship =

Annual hurling competition season

- Dates: 5 August - 15 October 2023
- Teams: 8
- Sponsor: Bathshack
- Champions: Ruairí Óg, Cushendall (15th title); Neil McManus (captain); Ryan McCambridge (captain); Brian Delargy (manager)
- Runners-up: Loughgiel Shamrocks; Declan McCloskey (captain); Hugh McCann (manager)

Tournament statistics
- Matches played: 17
- Goals scored: 55 (3.24 per match)
- Points scored: 657 (38.65 per match)

The 2023 Antrim Senior Hurling Championship was the 123rd staging of the Antrim Senior Hurling Championship since its establishment by the Antrim County Board in 1901. The draw for the group stage placings took place on 12 April 2023. The championship ran from 5 August to 15 October 2023.

Cúchulains Dunloy entered the championship as the defending champions, however, they were beaten by Loughgiel Shamrocks in the semi-finals.

The final was played on 15 October 2023 at Corrigan Park in Belfast, between RuairÍ Óg, Cushendall and Loughgiel Shamrocks, in what was their first meeting in the final in six years. RuairÍ Óg, Cushendall won the match by 1–20 to 1–19 to claim their 15th championship title overall and a first title in five years.

== Team changes ==
=== To Championship ===
Promoted from the Antrim Intermediate Hurling Championship

- Clooney Gaels

=== From Championship ===
Relegated to the Antrim Intermediate Hurling Championship

- Carey Faughs

== Group 1 ==
=== Group 1 table ===
Advance to semi-finals Advance to quarter-finals

Team	Matches				Score			Pts
Team	Pld	W	D	L	For	Against	Diff	Pts
Cúchulains Dunloy	3	3	0	0	100	55	45	6
O'Donovan Rossa	3	2	0	1	91	74	17	4
St John's	3	1	0	2	69	79	-10	2
Clooney Gaels	3	0	0	3	62	114	-52	0

=== Group 1 results ===
5 August 2023 Round 1	St John's	0-21 - 2-21	O'Donovan Rossa	Corrigan Park

6 August 2023 Round 1	Clooney Gaels	0-14 - 3-34	Cúchulains Dunloy	Fr McGuigan Park

19 August 2023 Round 2	O'Donovan Rossa	1-17 - 0-31	Cúchulains Dunloy	St Enda's Grounds

19 August 2023 Round 2	Clooney Gaels	3-17 - 2-21	St John's	Fr Healy Park

1 September 2023 Round 3	O'Donovan Rossa	6-26 - 2-16	Clooney Gaels	Páirc Rossa

2 September 2023 Round 3	Cúchulains Dunloy	0-26 - 0-21	St John's	Pearse Park

== Group 2 ==
=== Group 2 table ===
Advance to semi-finals Advance to quarter-finals

Team	Matches				Score			Pts
Team	Pld	W	D	L	For	Against	Diff	Pts
Ruairí Óg	3	3	0	0	95	45	50	6
Loughgiel Shamrocks	3	2	0	1	71	78	-7	4
McQuillan's Ballycastle	3	1	0	2	58	73	-15	2
St Enda's	3	0	0	3	65	93	-28	0

=== Group 2 results ===
5 August 2023 Round 1	Ruairí Óg, Cushendall	2-21 - 0-12	McQuillan's Ballycastle	Páirc Mhuire

6 August 2023 Round 1	St Enda's	1-22 - 3-23	Loughgiel Shamrocks	Páirc Éanna

18 August 2023 Round 2	St Enda's	1-11 - 6-16	Ruairí Óg, Cushendall	Slemish Park

20 August 2023 Round 2	McQuillan's Ballycastle	0-19 - 1-17	Loughgiel Shamrocks	Páirc Mhuire

3 September 2023 Round 3	McQuillan's Ballycastle	2-21 - 3-17	St Enda's	Páirc Mac Uílín

3 September 2023 Round 3	Loughgiel Shamrocks	0-19 - 4-22	Ruairí Óg, Cushendall	Fr Healy Park

== Knockout stage ==
=== Quarter-finals ===
17 September 2023 Quarter-final	O'Donovan Rossa	1-16 - 1-17	McQuillans Ballycastle	Corrigan Park

17 September 2023 Quarter-final	St John's	0-16 - 3-26	Loughgiel Shamrocks	Pearse Park

=== Semi-finals ===
30 September 2023 Semi-final	Ruairí Óg, Cushendall	4-15 - 1-09	McQuillans Ballycastle	Fr Healy Park

1 October 2023 Semi-final	Cú Chulainns Dunloy	0-13 - 1-21	Loughgiel Shamrocks	Páirc Mac Uílín

=== Final ===
15 October 2023 Final	Ruairí Óg, Cushendall	1-20 - 1-19	Loughgiel Shamrocks	Corrigan Park
	N McManus 0-5 (all frees), P Burke 0-4, F McCambridge 1-0, R McCambridge 0-3, J McLaughlin 0-3, N McCormick 0-2, F McCurry 0-2, E McQuillan 0-1	Report	J McNaughton 1-10 (0-6 frees), P Boyle 0-3, S McGrath 0-2 (1 free), R McMullan 0-2, C McGarry 0-1, Declan McCloskey 0-1	Referee: C Cunning (Dunloy)
