= 2026 Antrim Senior Hurling Championship =

Annual hurling competition season

- Dates: 14 August - 1 November 2026
- Teams: 8
- Sponsor: Bathshack
- Champions: Cúchulains Dunloy (17th title)
- Runners-up: RuairÍ Óg

The 2026 Antrim Senior Hurling Championship was the 126th staging of the Antrim Senior Hurling Championship since its establishment by the Antrim County Board in 1901. The draw for the group stage placings took place on 20 May 2026. The championship ran from 14 August to 1 November 2026.

St John's entered the championship as the defending champions. They lost in the quarter-finals against Glenariffe Oisín.

Cúchulains Dunloy won the final by defeating RuairÍ Óg 1-19 to 1-13 in the final to claim their 17th title and their first since 2022.

== Team changes ==
=== To Championship ===
Promoted from the Antrim Intermediate Hurling Championship

- Glenariffe Oisín

=== From Championship ===
- Carey Faughs

== Group 1 ==
Source: "Antrim Club Championship Group Stage fixtures" (PDF). Antrim GAA.

=== Group 1 table ===
Semi-finalist Quarter-finalist

| Team | Matches | | | | Score | | | Pts |
| Team | Pld | W | D | L | For | Against | Diff | Pts |
|---|---|---|---|---|---|---|---|---|
| Loughgiel Shamrocks | 3 | 3 | 0 | 0 | 79 | 53 | 26 | 6 |
| St John's | 3 | 1 | 1 | 1 | 68 | 71 | -3 | 3 |
| McQuillan's | 3 | 1 | 0 | 2 | 60 | 70 | -10 | 2 |
| O'Donovan Rossa | 3 | 0 | 1 | 2 | 58 | 71 | -13 | 1 |

=== Group 1 results ===
| 14 August 2026 Round 1 | St John's | 0-20 - 1-17 | O'Donovan Rossa | Corrigan Park |

| 16 August 2026 Round 1 | McQuillan's | 0-15 - 1-19 | Loughgiel Shamrocks | Ballycastle |

| 29 August 2026 Round 2 | McQuillan's | 1-18 - 1-22 | St John's | Ballymena |

| 29 August 2026 Round 2 | O'Donovan Rossa | 0-15 - 2-21 | Loughgiel Shamrocks | Randalstown |

| 12 September 2026 Round 3 | O'Donovan Rossa | 2-17 - 1-21 | McQuillan's | Pairc Rossa |

| 12 September 2026 Round 3 | Loughgiel Shamrocks | 0-30 - 3-14 | St John's | Fr Healy Park |

== Group 2 ==
Source: "Antrim Club Championship Group Stage fixtures" (PDF). Antrim GAA.

=== Group 2 table ===
Semi-finalist Quarter-finalist

| Team | Matches | | | | Score | | | Pts |
| Team | Pld | W | D | L | For | Against | Diff | Pts |
|---|---|---|---|---|---|---|---|---|
| Cúchulains Dunloy | 3 | 3 | 0 | 0 | 103 | 50 | 53 | 6 |
| RuairÍ Óg | 3 | 2 | 0 | 1 | 72 | 48 | 24 | 4 |
| Glenariffe | 3 | 1 | 0 | 2 | 51 | 79 | -28 | 2 |
| St Enda's | 3 | 0 | 0 | 3 | 40 | 89 | -49 | 0 |

=== Group 2 results ===
| 15 August 2026 Round 1 | St Enda's | 0-13 - 3-23 | RuairÍ Óg | Páirc Éanna |

| 16 August 2026 Round 1 | Cúchulains Dunloy | 4-30 - 1-17 | Glenariffe | Pearse Park, Dunloy |

| 30 August 2026 Round 2 | St Enda's | 0-12 - 3-28 | Cúchulains Dunloy | Ahoghill |

| 30 August 2026 Round 2 | Glenariffe | 0-11 - 2-16 | RuairÍ Óg | Ballycastle |

| 13 September 2026 Round 3 | RuairÍ Óg | 0-18 - 1-21 | Cúchulains Dunloy | Ruairí Óg Cushendall |

| 13 September 2026 Round 3 | Glenariffe | 1-17 - 0-15 | St Enda's | Glenariffe |

== Knockout stage ==
=== Quarter-finals ===
| 26 September 2026 Quarter-final | St John's | 1-16 - 2-20 | Glenariffe | Ballymena |
| | | Report |

| 27 September 2026 Quarter-final | RuairÍ Óg | 2-23 - 4-13 | McQuillan's | Dunloy |
| | | Report |

=== Semi-finals ===
| 10 October 2026 Semi-final | Cúchulains Dunloy | 5-21 - 0-06 | Glenariffe | Ruairi Óg Cushendall |
| | | Report |

| 11 October 2026 Semi-final | Loughgiel Shamrocks | 0-20 - 2-16 | RuairÍ Óg | Ballycastle |
| | | Report |

=== Final ===
| 1 November 2026 Final | Cúchulains Dunloy | 1-19 - 1-13 | RuairÍ Óg | Ballycastle |
| | | Report |
