= 2024 Antrim Senior Hurling Championship =

Annual hurling competition season

- Dates: 10 August - 20 October 2024
- Teams: 7
- Sponsor: Bathshack
- Champions: Ruairí Óg, Cushendall (16th title); Neil McManus (captain); Brian Delargy (manager)
- Runners-up: Dunloy

Tournament statistics
- Matches played: 14
- Goals scored: 30 (2.14 per match)
- Points scored: 504 (36 per match)

The 2024 Antrim Senior Hurling Championship was the 124th staging of the Antrim Senior Hurling Championship since its establishment by the Antrim County Board in 1901. The draw for the group stage placings took place on 17 May 2024. The championship ran from 10 August to 20 October 2024.

RuairÍ Óg, Cushendall were the defending champions.

The final was played on 20 October 2024 at Corrigan Park in Belfast, between RuairÍ Óg, Cushendall and Cúchulains Dunloy, in what was their first ever meeting in the final in two years. RuairÍ Óg, Cushendall won the match by 1–16 to 2–12 to claim their 16th championship title overall and a second title in succession.

== Team changes ==
=== From Championship ===
Regraded to the Antrim Intermediate Hurling Championship

- Clooney Gaels

== Group 1 ==
=== Group 1 table ===
Advance to semi-finals Advance to quarter-finals

Team	Matches				Score			Pts
Team	Pld	W	D	L	For	Against	Diff	Pts
Loughgiel Shamrocks	2	2	0	0	48	28	20	4
St Enda's	2	0	1	1	35	45	-10	1
McQuillan's Ballycastle	2	0	1	1	29	39	-10	1

=== Group 1 results ===
11 August 2024 Round 1	St Enda's	0-17 - 2-21	Loughgiel Shamrocks	Páirc Éanna

24 August 2024 Round 2	McQuillan's Ballycastle	1-15 - 1-15	St Enda's	Páirc Mac Uílín

8 September 2024 Round 3	Loughgiel Shamrocks	2-15 - 0-11	McQuillan's Ballycastle	Fr Healy Park

== Group 2 ==
=== Group 2 table ===
Advance to semi-finals Advance to quarter-finals

Team	Matches				Score			Pts
Team	Pld	W	D	L	For	Against	Diff	Pts
Ruairí Óg	3	3	0	0	72	52	20	6
Cúchulains Dunloy	3	2	0	1	68	60	8	4
St John's	3	1	0	2	59	66	-7	2
O'Donovan Rossa	3	0	0	3	59	80	-21	0

=== Group 2 results ===
10 August 2024 Round 1	Cúchulains Dunloy	0-24 - 0-18	St John's	Pearse Park

11 August 2024 Round 1	O'Donovan Rossa	1-19 - 3-16	Ruairí Óg	Rossa Park

25 August 2024 Round 2	O'Donovan Rossa	1-12 - 2-19	Cúchulains Dunloy	Dunsilly Pitch 1

25 August 2024 Round 2	St John's	1-08 - 2-14	Ruairí Óg	Slemish Park

7 September 2024 Round 3	St John's	1-27 - 2-16	O'Donovan Rossa	Corrigan Park

7 September 2024 Round 3	Ruairí Óg	1-24 - 0-19	Cúchulains Dunloy	Páirc Mhuire

== Knockout stage ==
=== Quarter-finals ===
21 September 2024 Quarter-final	St Enda's	2-15 - 0-30	St John's	Rossa Park

22 September 2024 Quarter-final	McQuillan's Ballycastle	1-18 - 1-24	Dunloy	Fr Healy Park

=== Semi-finals ===
5 October 2024 Semi-final	Ruairí Óg	1-27 - 0-26	St John's	Pearse Park
	N McManus 0-14 (10f’s); E Campbell 0-3; R McCambridge 0-3; Paddy McGill 0-3; R McAteer 1-00; J McLaughlin 0-2 (1f); C McAuley 0-1; F McCurry 0-1	Report	O MacManus 0-12 (8fs, 2 ‘65s); S Shannon 0-3; Conor Johnston 0-3; Ciaran Johnston 0-2; R McNulty 0-2; Darragh McGuinness 0-2; M Dudley 0-1; C Bohill 0-1

6 October 2024 Semi-final	Loughgiel Shamrocks	0-11 - 2-15	Dunloy	Páirc Mhuire
	J McNaughton (0-7, 0-5 frees), S McGrath (0-3), R McMullan (0-1).	Report	N Elliott (1-1), S Elliott (0-4, 0-3 frees), K Molloy (1-0); E O’Neill (0-2), N McKeague (0-2), P Martin (0-2), C Cunning (0-1), A McGarry (0-1), T McFerran (0-1); G McTaggart (0-1).

=== Final ===
20 October 2024 Final	Ruairí Óg	1-16 - 2-12	Dunloy	Corrigan Park
	N McManus 0-7 (5f, 2 65s); E McQuillan 1-0; J McLaughlin 0-2, F McCambridge 0-2; F McCurry 0-1, E Campbell 0-1, R McAteer 0-1, P McGill 0-1, C McAlister 0-1 (free)	Report	S Elliott 1-4 (1-0 pen, 0-2f, 0-2 65s), E O'Neill 1-1, Keelan Molloy 0-3, P Shiels 0-3 (2f), A McGarry 0-1.	Referee: C McCloskey (Loughgiel Shamrocks)
