= 2018 Antrim Senior Hurling Championship =

Annual hurling competition season

- Dates: 12 August - 28 October 2018
- Teams: 7
- Sponsor: Bathshack
- Champions: Ruairí Óg, Cushendall (14th title); Paddy Burke (captain); Eamon Gillan (manager)
- Runners-up: Loughgiel Shamrocks
- Relegated: Patrick Sarsfields

Tournament statistics
- Matches played: 12
- Goals scored: 40 (3.33 per match)
- Points scored: 392 (32.67 per match)

The 2018 Antrim Senior Hurling Championship was the 118th staging of the Antrim Senior Hurling Championship since its establishment by the Antrim County Board in 1901. The draw for the group stage placings took place on 30 January 2018. The championship ran from 12 August to 28 October 2018.

Cúchulains Dunloy entered the championship as the defending champions, however, they were beaten by Loughgiel Shamrocks in the semi-finals.

The final was played on 28 October 2018 at Páirc Mac Uílín in Ballycastle, between RuairÍ Óg, Cushendall and Loughgiel Shamrocks, in what was their first meeting in the final in two years. RuairÍ Óg, Cushendall won the match by 2–12 to 0–15 to claim their 14th championship title overall and a first title in three years.

== Team changes ==
=== To Championship ===
Promoted from the Antrim Intermediate Hurling Championship

- Patrick Sarsfields

=== From Championship ===
Regraded to the Antrim Intermediate Hurling Championship

- Clooney Gaels
- Creggan Kickhams
- St Brigid's, Cloughmills

== Qualifying stage ==
=== Preliminary round ===
12 August 2018 Round 1	McQuillan's Ballycastle	1-15 - 5-17	St John's	Páirc Mac Uílín
	D McShane (1-11, 0-9 frees, 1-0 penalty), C Butler (0-2), TT Butler (0-2), C Connor (0-1).	Report	M Dudley (2-1), Conor Johnston (0-7, 3 frees), D Carson (1-2), J Peoples (1-0); S Shannon (1-0), M Bradley (0-3), C McFall (0-1); D Moran (0-1).

26 August 2018 Round 2	St John's	2-21 - 2-13	McQuillan's Ballycastle	Corrigan Park
		Report

St John's won 7–38 to 3–28 on aggregate.

== Group 1 ==
=== Group 1 table ===
Knockout stage

Team	Matches				Score			Pts
Team	Pld	W	D	L	For	Against	Diff	Pts
Cúchulains Dunloy	2	2	0	0	56	30	26	4
RuairÍ Óg, Cushendall	2	1	0	1	56	30	26	2
Patrick Sarsfields	2	0	0	2	25	77	-52	0

=== Round 1 results ===
25 August 2018 Round 1	RuairÍ Óg, Cushendall	0-17 - 0-18	Cúchulains Dunloy	Páirc Naomh Mhuire
	P McGill 0-5 (4 f’s); F McCambridge 0-3; R McCambridge 0-3; D McNaughton 0-3; E Campbell 0-2; C McClafferty 0-1	Report	P Shiels 0-10 (7 f’s); K Molloy 0-4; E O’Neill 0-2; C McKinley 0-1; N Elliott 0-1

1 September 2018 Round 2	Cúchulains Dunloy	2-32 - 1-10	Patrick Sarsfields	Pearse Park
	N McKeague 0-16 (11 f’s); C Cunning 1-5; K Molloy 1-3; S Dooey 0-2; C Brogan 0-2; C McMahon 0-2; C McKinley 0-1; P Conlon 0-1.	Report	K McKernan 0-7 (5 f’s 1 side line); T Doherty 1-00; D McKernan 0-2; A Stewart 0-1

15 September 2018 Round 3	Patrick Sarsfields	0-12 - 3-30	RuairÍ Óg, Cushendall	The Bear Pit
		Report

== Group 2 ==
=== Group 2 table ===
Knockout stage

Team	Matches				Score			Pts
Team	Pld	W	D	L	For	Against	Diff	Pts
Loughgiel Shamrocks	2	2	0	0	64	28	36	4
St John's	2	1	0	1	51	46	5	2
O'Donovan Rossa	2	0	0	2	29	70	-41	0

=== Group 2 results ===
25 August 2018 Round 1	O'Donovan Rossa	0-07 - 6-22	Loughgiel Shamrocks	Rossa Park
	T Murphy (0-03, 0-02f), T Morgan (0-02), S Beatty (0-01), M Devlin (0-01),	Report	S Casey (2-03), D McCloskey (2-02), J McNaughton (0-06, 0-03f), S McGrath (1-01), T Coyle (1-00), M Connolly (0-03), L Watson (0-03, 0-01f), E McCloskey (0-02), O McFadden (0-01), R McKee (0-01).

2 September 2018 Round	Loughgiel Shamrocks	2-18 - 2-15	St John's	Fr Healy Park
		Report

16 September 2018 Round	St John's	2-24 - 3-13	O'Donovan Rossa	Corrigan Park
	D Carson (2-01), M Bradley (0-06, 0-01f), C Johnston (0-05, 0-04f), S McCrory (0-03), C Johnston (0-02, 0-01f), M Dudley (0-02), J Peoples (0-01), B McFall (0-01), P McCallin (0-01), C McFall (0-01).	Report	M Devlin (0-09f), T Morgan (2-02), O McVicker (1-00), S Beatty (0-01), O O’Callaghan (0-01).

== Knockout stage ==
=== Semi-finals ===
29 September 2018 Semi-final	RuairÍ Óg, Cushendall	1-16 - 1-16	St John's	Pearse Park
	N McManus 0-8 (5 f’s, 1 ’65); A Delargy 1-00; E Campbell 0-2; P McGill 0-2; C McClafferty 0-2; D McNaughton 0-2	Report	C Johnston 0-5 (4 f’s); C Johnston 0-5 (4 f’s); D Carson 1-2; S Shannon 0-2; P McCallin 0-1; B McFall 0-1.

30 September 2018 Semi-final	Loughgiel Shamrocks	0-14 - 0-08	Cúchulains Dunloy	Páirc Mac Uílín
	J McNaughton 0-8 (4 f’s); J Scullion 0-2; M McFadden 0-1; D McKinley 0-1; E McCloskey 0-1; S Casey 0-1	Report	P Shiels 0-5 (2 f’s); K Molloy 0-1; N Elliott 0-1; K Molloy 0-1

14 October 2018 Semi-final replay	RuairÍ Óg, Cushendall	2-16 - 3-11	St John's	Páirc Mac Uílín
	N McManus 0-7 5 f’s); C Carson 2-00; F McCambridge 0-2; R McCambridge 0-2; F McCurry 0-1; C McClafferty 0-1; P McGill 0-1; D McNaughton 0-1; E Laverty 0-1 (1 f).	Report	C Johnston 1-7 (4 f’s); B McFall 1-1; P McCallin 1-00; M Dudley 0-1; M Bradley 0-1; C Johnston 0-1 (1 f).

=== Final ===
28 October 2018 Final	Loughgiel Shamrocks	0-15 - 2-12	RuairÍ Óg, Cushendall	Páirc Mac Uílín
	J McNaughton (0-9, 0-6 frees), D McCloskey (0-3), T Coyle (0-2); J Scullion (0-1).	Report	C Carson (1-1), N McManus (0-4, 0-3 frees), P Burke (1-0), D McNaughton (0-3), P McGill (0-2, 0-1 free), R McCambridge (0-1); E Campbell (0-1).
