= 2021 Antrim Senior Hurling Championship =

Annual hurling competition season

- Dates: 24 August - 10 October 2021
- Teams: 8
- Sponsor: Bathshack
- Champions: Cúchulains Dunloy (15th title); Paul Shiels (captain); Gregory O'Kane (manager)
- Runners-up: O'Donovan Rossa; Stephen Beatty (captain); Cóilín Ó Murchíú (manager)
- Relegated: Tír na nÓg, Randalstown

Tournament statistics
- Matches played: 17
- Goals scored: 58 (3.41 per match)
- Points scored: 671 (39.47 per match)

The 2021 Antrim Senior Hurling Championship was the 121st staging of the Antrim Senior Hurling Championship since its establishment by the Antrim County Board in 1901. The championship began on 24 August 2021 and ended on 10 October 2021.

Cúchulains Dunloy entered the championship as the defending champions.

The final was played on 10 October 2021 at Corrigan Park in Belfast, between Cúchulains Dunloy and O'Donovan Rossa, in what was their first meeting in a final in 24 years. Cúchulains Dunloy won the match by 3–23 to 1–14 to claim their 15th championship title overall and a third successive title.

== Team changes ==
=== To Championship ===
Promoted from the Antrim Intermediate Hurling Championship

- Tír na nÓg, Randalstown

== Group 1 ==
=== Group 1 table ===
Advance to semi-finals Advance to quarter-finals

Team	Matches				Score			Pts
Team	Pld	W	D	L	For	Against	Diff	Pts
O'Donovan Rossa	3	3	0	0	83	57	26	6
Loughgiel Shamrocks	3	2	0	1	78	64	14	4
St Enda's	3	1	0	2	64	86	-22	2
McQuillan's Ballycastle	3	0	0	3	65	83	-18	0

== Group 2 ==
=== Group 2 table ===
Advance to semi-finals Advance to quarter-finals

Team	Matches				Score			Pts
Team	Pld	W	D	L	For	Against	Diff	Pts
Cúchulains Dunloy	3	2	1	0	107	57	50	5
Ruairí Óg, Cushendall	3	2	1	0	86	57	29	5
St John's	3	1	0	2	80	89	-9	2
Tír na nÓg, Randalstown	3	0	0	3	48	118	-70	0

== Knockout stage ==
=== Quarter-finals ===
12 September 2021 Quarter-final	St Enda's	0-16 - 1-20	Ruairí Óg, Cushendall	Dunsilly GAA Complex

12 September 2021 Quarter-final	Loughgiel Shamrocks	1-22 - 2-21	St John's	Roger Casement Park

=== Semi-finals ===
26 September 2021 Semi-final	O'Donovan Rossa	4-18 - 3-20	Ruairí Óg, Cushendall	Dunsilly GAA Complex

26 September 2021 Semi-final	Cúchulains Dunloy	1-19 - 0-13	St John's	Dunsilly GAA Complex

=== Final ===
10 October 2021 Final	Cúchullains Dunloy	3-23 - 1-14	O'Donovan Rossa	Corrigan Park
	C Cunning (1-11, 0-08 frees), S Elliott (1-02), K Molloy (0-05), C McMahon (1-01), P Shiels (0-02), K Molloy (0-01); E O'Neill (0-01).	Report	S Beatty (1-04); C McGuinness (0-03), T Morgan (0-03), D Murphy (0-02 frees); G Walsh (0-01 free), S Shannon (0-01).	Referee: M O'Neill (Armoy)
