= 2022 Antrim Senior Hurling Championship =

Annual hurling competition season

- Dates: 5 August - 16 October 2022
- Teams: 8
- Sponsor: Bathshack
- Champions: Cúchulains Dunloy (16th title); Paul Shiels (captain); Ryan Elliott (captain); Gregory O'Kane (manager)
- Runners-up: Ruairí Óg, Cushendall
- Relegated: Carey Faughs

Tournament statistics
- Matches played: 17
- Goals scored: 47 (2.76 per match)
- Points scored: 644 (37.88 per match)

The 2022 Antrim Senior Hurling Championship was the 122nd staging of the Antrim Senior Hurling Championship since its establishment by the Antrim County Board in 1901. The draw for the group stage placings took place on 14 March 2022. The championship ran from 5 August to 16 October 2022.

Cúchulains Dunloy entered the championship as the defending champions.

The final was played on 16 October 2022 at Corrigan Park in Belfast, between Cúchulains Dunloy and Ruairí Óg, Cushendall, in what was their first meeting in a final in three years. Cúchulains Dunloy won the match by 1–20 to 2–11 to claim their 16th championship title overall and a fourth successive title.

== Team changes ==
=== To Championship ===
Promoted from the Antrim Intermediate Hurling Championship

- Carey Faughs

=== From Championship ===
Relegated to the Antrim Intermediate Hurling Championship

- Tír na nÓg, Randalstown

== Group 1 ==
=== Group 1 table ===
Advance to semi-finals Advance to quarter-finals

Team	Matches				Score			Pts
Team	Pld	W	D	L	For	Against	Diff	Pts
Cúchulains Dunloy	3	3	0	0	84	50	34	6
O'Donovan Rossa	3	2	0	1	81	54	27	4
McQuillan's Ballycastle	3	1	0	2	68	74	-6	2
Carey Faughs	3	0	0	3	55	110	-55	0

=== Group 1 results ===
6 August 2022 Round 1	O'Donovan Rossa	3-31 - 3-17	Carey Faughs	Páirc Rossa

6 August 2022 Round 1	McQuillan's Ballycastle	1-16 - 2-29	Cúchulains Dunloy	Páirc Mac Uílín

20 August 2022 Round 2	Carey Faughs	1-13 - 2-23	Cúchulains Dunloy	Fr Healy Park

20 August 2022 Round 2	McQuillan's Ballycastle	0-08 - 0-26	O'Donovan Rossa	Dunsilly GAA Complex

3 September 2022 Round 3	Carey Faughs	0-13 - 5-26	McQuillan's Ballycastle	St Patrick's Park

3 September 2022 Round 3	Cúchulains Dunloy	1-17 - 0-15	O'Donovan Rossa	Pearse Park

== Group 2 ==
=== Group 2 table ===
Advance to semi-finals Advance to quarter-finals

Team	Matches				Score			Pts
Team	Pld	W	D	L	For	Against	Diff	Pts
Ruairí Óg	3	3	0	0	83	45	38	6
St John's	3	2	0	1	80	61	19	4
Loughgiel Shamrocks	3	1	0	2	68	58	10	2
St Enda's	3	0	0	3	32	99	-69	0

=== Group 2 results ===
5 August 2022 Round 1	St Enda's	0-08 - 2-30	Ruairí Óg, Cushendall	St Enda's Grounds

6 August 2022 Round 1	St John's	0-25 - 1-20	Loughgiel Shamrocks	Corrigan Park

21 August 2022 Round 2	Loughgiel Shamrocks	1-15 - 1-20	Ruairí Óg, Cushendall	Dunsilly GAA COmplex

21 August 2022 Round 2	St Enda's	0-14 - 2-30	St John's	Páirc Rossa

4 September 2022 Round 3	Ruairí Óg, Cushendall	1-21 - 1-16	St John's	Pirc Mhuire

4 September 2022 Round 3	Loughgiel Shamrocks	1-24 - 0-10	St Enda's	Fr Healy Park

== Knockout stage ==
=== Quarter-finals ===
18 September 2022 Quarter-final	Loughgiel Shamrocks	3-27 - 0-20	O'Donovan Rossa	Dunsilly GAA Complex
		Report

18 September 2022 Quarter-final	St John's	1-18 - 1-17	McQuillan's Ballycastle	Dunsilly GAA Complex
	O McManus 1-7 (4fs 1 ’65); S Shannon 0-4; A Bradley 0-3; M Dudley 0-2; R Galbraith 0-1; O Donnelly 0-1	Report	T Smyth 1-6 (6fs); D McShane 0-3; J McToal 0-2; S McAuley 0-2; R McGarry 0-2; E McAlonan 0-1; C Boyd 0-1

=== Semi-finals ===
2 October 2022 Semi-final	Loughgiel Shamrocks	2-14 - 3-16	Ruairí Óg, Cushendall	Páirc Mac Uílín
	M Connelly 1-3 (0-1f), J McNaughton 0-5 (0-3fs), R McMullan 1-2, S McGrath 0-2, C McGarry 0-2, E McCloskey 0-1, R McKee 0-1.	Report	N McManus 0-10 (0-6s), C McNaughton 1-2, S McAfee 1-1, A Delargy 1-0, R McCambridge 0-1.

2 October 2022 Semi-final	Cúchulains Dunloy	5-22 - 1-12	St John's	Dunsilly GAA Complex
	C Cunning (2-8, 0-3 frees), Keelan Molloy (1-3), N Elliott (1-1); R Molloy (1-0), P Shiels (0-3, 0-1 free), C McMahon (0-2), D Smyth (0-1); E Smyth (0-1); N McKeague (0-1), S Elliott (0-1), R McGarry (0-1).	Report	O MacManus (0-4 frees), P Nugent (1-0, free), Ciaran Johnston (0-3), R Galbraith (0-2), S Shannon (0-1), A Bradley (0-1), O Donnelly (0-1).

=== Final ===
16 October 2022 Final	Cúchulains Dunloy	1-20 - 2-11	Ruairí Óg, Cushendall	Corrigan Park
	C Cunning 0-11 (9f, 1 65), C McMahon 1-1, K Molloy 0-3, S Elliott 0-1, N Elliott 0-1, A Crawford 0-1, E Smyth 0-1, R McGarry 0-1.	Report	N McManus 0-7 (5f, 1 65), S McAfee 1-1, C McClafferty 1-0, E Campbell 0-1, F McCurry 0-1, N McCormack 0-1.	Referee: K Parke (Naomh Éanna)
