= 2014 Antrim Senior Hurling Championship =

Annual hurling competition season

The 2014 Antrim Senior Hurling Championship is the 114th staging of the Antrim Senior Hurling Championship since its establishment by the Antrim County Board in 1901. The championship began on 3 August 2014.

Loughgiel Shamrocks were the reigning champions, however, they were defeated in the quarter-final stage. Ruairí Óg, Cushendall won the title following a 1–15 to 1–5 defeat of St Gall's in the final at Páirc Mac Uílín.

Commonly the finals take place at Antrim's county stadium, Casement Park, however due to the grounds ongoing developments the 2014 final was held at Páirc Mac Uílín in Ballycastle.

== Results ==
=== Round 1 ===
3 August 2014 Round 1	Loughgiel Shamrocks	7-13 - 2-6	St John's	Pearse Park
19:30		Report		Referee: É Hassan

=== Quarter-finals ===
30 August 2014 Quarter-final	Dunloy	0-18 - 3-5	McQuillan Ballycastle	Fr. Healy Park
18:00				Referee: D McKeown

31 August 2014 Quarter-final	St Brigid's Cloughmills	1-16 - 2-13	Patrick Sarsfields	Pearse Park
13:00				Referee: A Kelly

31 August 2014 Quarter-final	Ghaeil Chluanaidh	2-12 - 1-16	St Gall's	Pearse Park
14:30

31 August 2014 Quarter-final	Ruairí Óg, Cushendall	2-12 - 0-12	Loughgiel Shamrocks	Páirc Mac Uílín
18:00

3 September 2014 Quarter-final replay	St Brigid's Cloughmills	2-14 - 1-19	Patrick Sarsfields	Páirc Mac Uílín
20:00

=== Semi-finals ===
13 September 2014 Semi-final	Patrick Sarsfields	0-12 - 0-14	St Gall's	Corrigan Park
17:30				Referee: C Cunning

14 September 2014 Semi-final	Ruairí Óg, Cushendall	2-10 - 0-11	Dunloy	Fr. Healy Park
	D McNaughton (1-2), C McNaughton (1-0), N McManus (0-5, all frees), C Carson (0-2), K McKeegan (0-1).	Report	P Shiels (0-6, 5 frees), S Dooey (0-2), N Elliott (0-2), K Molloy (0-1).	Referee: G Duffy

=== Final ===
28 September 2014 Final	St Gall's	1-5 - 1-15	Ruairí Óg, Cushendall	Páirc Mac Uílín
