= 2020 Antrim Senior Hurling Championship =

Annual hurling competition season

- Dates: 9 August - 13 September 2020
- Teams: 8
- Sponsor: Bathshack
- Champions: Cúchulains Dunloy (14th title); Paul Shiels (captain); Gregory O'Kane (manager)
- Runners-up: Loughgiel Shamrocks; Hugh McCann (manager)

The 2020 Antrim Senior Hurling Championship was the 120th staging of the Antrim Senior Hurling Championship since its establishment by the Antrim County Board in 1901. The championship was postponed indefinitely due to the impact of the COVID-19 pandemic on Gaelic games, before eventually beginning on 9 August 2020 and ending on 13 September 2020.

Cúchulains Dunloy entered the championship as the defending champions.

The final was played on 13 September 2020 at Páirc Mac Uílín in Ballycastle, between Cúchulains Dunloy and Loughgiel Shamrocks, in what was their first meeting in a final in eight years. Cúchulains Dunloy won the match by 2–20 to 2–12 to claim their 14th championship title overall and a second successive title.

== Results ==
=== Knockout stage ===
==== Quarter-finals ====
| 29 August 2020 Quarter-final | St John's | 1-16 - 0-15 | St Gall's |

| 29 August 2020 Quarter-final | O'Donovan Rossa | 2-11 - 0-16 | Ruairí Óg, Cushendall |

==== Semi-finals ====
| 6 September 2020 Semi-final | Cúchullains Dunloy | 1-22 - 2-18 | O'Donovan Rossa |

| 6 September 2020 Semi-final | Loughgiel Shamrocks | 2-31 - 5-18 (aet) | St John's |

==== Final ====
| 13 September 2020 Final | Cúchullains Dunloy | 2-20 - 2-12 | Loughgiel Shamrocks | Páirc Mac Uílín |
| | C Cunning (0-8, 6f), Keelan Molloy (0-5), Kevin Molloy (1-2), E O'Neill (1-2), S Elliott (0-2), P Shiels (0-1f) | Report | L Watson (1-4, 1-0f, 1xSL), J McNaughton (0-4f), B McCarry (1-0), Donal McKinley (0-3) E McCloskey, S McGrath, S Casey 0-1 each | Referee: D McKeown (St Gall's) |
