= 1986 Antrim Senior Hurling Championship =

Annual hurling competition season

- Champions: McQuillan Ballycastle (17th title)
- Runners-up: St John's

The 1986 Antrim Senior Hurling Championship was the 86th staging of the Antrim Senior Hurling Championship since its establishment by the Antrim County Board in 1901.

Ruairí Óg, Cushendall entered the championship as the defending champions.

The final was played on 31 August 1986 at Pearse Park in Dunloy, between McQuillan Ballycastle and St John's, in what was their first meeting in the final in eight years. McQuillan Ballycastle won the match by 1–20 to 0–07 to claim a their 17th championship title overall and a first title in two years.

== Results ==
=== Semi-finals ===
17 August 1986 Semi-final	McQuillan Ballycastle	6-23 - 2-05	St Paul's	Casement Park

17 August 1986 Semi-final	St John's	2-13 - 3-08	Loughgiel Shamrocks	Pearse Park

=== Final ===
31 August 1986 Final	McQuillan Ballycastle	1-20 - 0-07	St John's	Pearse Park
