= 2010 Antrim Senior Hurling Championship =

Annual hurling competition season

- Champions: Loughgiel Shamrocks (16th title); Johnny Campbell (captain); P. J. O'Mullan (manager)
- Runners-up: Ruairí Óg, Cushendall

The 2010 Antrim Senior Hurling Championship was the 110th staging of the Antrim Senior Hurling Championship since its establishment by the Antrim County Board in 1901.

Cuchullians Dunloy entered the championship as the defending champions.

The final was played on 26 September 2010 at Casement Park in Belfast, between Loughgiel Shamrocks and Ruairí Óg, Cushendall, in what was their fifth meeting in the final overall. Loughgiel Shamrocks the match by 1–09 to 0–11 to claim their 16th championship title overall and a first title in 21 years.

== Results ==
=== Final ===
26 September 2010 Final	Loughgiel Shamrocks	1-09 - 0-11	Ruairí Óg, Cushendall	Casement Park
	L Watson 0-6 (0-5f), E McCloskey 1-1, B McCarry, B McAuley 0-1 each.	Report	P McGill 0-4 (0-3f), P McNaughton 0-2, D McKillop, S Delargy, K McKeegan, S McNaughton, B Delargy 0-1 each.
