= 1991 Antrim Senior Hurling Championship =

Annual hurling competition season

- Champions: Ruairí Óg, Cushendall (4th title)
- Runners-up: St John's

The 1991 Antrim Senior Hurling Championship was the 91st staging of the Antrim Senior Hurling Championship since its establishment by the Antrim County Board in 1901.

Cuchullians Dunloy entered the championship as the defending champions.

The final was played on 22 September 1991 at Casement Park in Belfast, between Ruairí Óg, Cushendall and St John's, in what was their first ever meeting in the final. Ruairí Óg, Cushendall won the match by 1–05 to 0–07 to claim their fourth championship title overall and a first title in four years.

== Results ==
=== Final ===
22 September 1991 Final	Ruairí Óg, Cushendall	1-05 - 0-07	St John's	Casement Park
