= 1978 Antrim Senior Hurling Championship =

Annual hurling competition season

- Champions: McQuillan Ballycastle (12th title)
- Runners-up: St John's

The 1978 Antrim Senior Hurling Championship was the 78th staging of the Antrim Senior Hurling Championship since its establishment by the Antrim County Board in 1901.

O'Donovan Rossa entered the championship as the defending champions.

The final was played on 10 September 1978 at Casement Park in Belfast, between McQuillan Ballycastle and St John's, in what was their first meeting in the final in five years. McQuillan Ballycastle won the match by 2–11 to 1–06 to claim their 12th championship title overall and a first title in three years.

== Results ==
=== Final ===
| 10 September 1978 Final | McQuillan Ballycastle | 2-11 - 1-06 | St John's | Casement Park |
