= 2016 Antrim Senior Hurling Championship =

Annual hurling competition season

- Dates: 7 August – 25 September 2016
- Teams: 9
- Sponsor: Bathshack
- Champions: Loughgiel Shamrocks

The 2016 Antrim Senior Hurling Championship was the 116th staging of the Antrim Senior Hurling Championship since its establishment by the Antrim County Board in 1901. The championship began on 7 August 2016 ended on 25 September 2016.

== Preliminary match ==
7 August 2016 Preliminary round	Clooney Gaels	2-7 - 2-19	McQuillan Ballycastle	Pearse Park, Dunloy
7pm				Referee: M Hardy

== Quarter-finals ==
27 August 2016 Quarter-final	St Gall's	1-7 - 4-24	Loughgiel Shamrocks	Slemish Park, Ballymena
16:30				Referee: O Elliot

27 August 2016 Quarter-final	Creggan Kickhams	1-12 - 6-29	Ruairí Óg, Cushendall	Slemish Park, Ballymena
18:30				Referee: E Hassan

28 August 2016 Quarter-final	O'Donovan Rossa	1-22 - 1-18	St John's	Páirc Lámh Dhearg, Hannahstown
14:00				Referee: C Cunning

28 August 2016 Quarter-final	Dunloy	1-13 - 1-18	McQuillan Ballycastle	Fr. Healy Park, Loughgiel
18:30				Referee: M O'Neill

== Semi-finals ==
10 September 2016 Semi-final	Ruairí Óg, Cushendall	1-24 - 1-17	O'Donovan Rossa	Corrigan Park, Belfast
17:00

11 September 2016 Semi-final	Loughgiel Shamrocks	0-19 - 0-12	McQuillan Ballycastle	Fr Maginn Park, Glenravel
16:00

== Final ==
25 September 2016
3:00 pm
Final

Loughgiel Shamrocks	1-15 - 1-12	Ruairí Óg, Cushendall

Páirc Mac Uílín, Ballycastle
