= 2004 Antrim Senior Hurling Championship =

Annual hurling competition season

- Champions: O'Donovan Rossa (15th title)
- Runners-up: Loughgiel Shamrocks

The 2004 Antrim Senior Hurling Championship was the 104th staging of the Antrim Senior Hurling Championship since its establishment by the Antrim County Board in 1901.

Cuchullians Dunloy entered the championship as the defending champions.

The final was played on 3 October 2004 at Casement Park in Belfast, between O'Donovan Rossa and Loughgiel Shamrocks, in what was their fifth meeting in the final overall. O'Donovan Rossa won the match by 1–14 to 2–04 to claim their 15th championship title overall and a first title in 16 years.

== Results ==
=== Final ===
3 October 2004 Final	O'Donovan Rossa	1-14 - 2-04	Loughgiel Shamrocks	Casement Park
