= 1976 Antrim Senior Hurling Championship =

Annual hurling competition season

- Champions: O'Donovan Rossa (12th title)
- Runners-up: Cuchullians Dunloy

The 1976 Antrim Senior Hurling Championship was the 76th staging of the Antrim Senior Hurling Championship since its establishment by the Antrim County Board in 1901.

McQuillan Ballycastle entered the championship as the defending champions.

The final was played on 3 October 1976 at Casement Park in Belfast, between O'Donovan Rossa and Cuchullians Dunloy, in what was their first ever meeting in the final. O'Donovan Rossa won the match by 3–17 to 0–12 to claim their 12th championship title overall and a first title in four years.

== Results ==
=== Final ===
3 October 1976 Final	O'Donovan Rossa	3-17 - 0-12	Cuchullians Dunloy	Casement Park
