= 2005 Antrim Senior Hurling Championship =

Annual hurling competition season

- Champions: Ruairí Óg, Cushendall (9th title); Conor McCambridge (captain)
- Runners-up: Loughgiel Shamrocks

The 2005 Antrim Senior Hurling Championship was the 105th staging of the Antrim Senior Hurling Championship since its establishment by the Antrim County Board in 1901.

O'Donovan Rossa entered the championship as the defending champions.

The final was played on 2 October 2005 at Casement Park in Belfast, between Ruairí Óg, Cushendall and Loughgiel Shamrocks, in what was their second meeting in the final overall and a first meeting in the final in 20 years. Ruairí Óg, Cushendall won the match by 2–10 to 0–15 to claim their ninth championship title overall and a first title in six years.

== Results ==
=== Final ===
2 October 2005 Final	Ruairí Óg, Cushendall	2-10 - 0-15	Loughgiel Shamrocks	Casement Park
	C McCambridge 2-2, A Delargy 0-4(1f), E McKillop, D and S McNaughton, J Carson 0-1 each.	Report	L Watson 0-8(3f), B McGarry 0-3(1f), S Óg McFadden 0-2, J Campbell 0-1.
