= 1982 Antrim Senior Hurling Championship =

Annual hurling competition season

- Champions: Loughgiel Shamrocks (14th title); Niall Patterson (captain)
- Runners-up: McQuillan Ballycastle

The 1982 Antrim Senior Hurling Championship was the 82nd staging of the Antrim Senior Hurling Championship since its establishment by the Antrim County Board in 1901.

Ruairí Óg, Cushendall entered the championship as the defending champions.

The final was played on 12 September 1982 at Pearse Park in Dunloy, between Loughgiel Shamrocks and McQuillan Ballycastle, in what was their fourth meeting in the final overall. Loughgiel Shamrocks won the match by 5–09 to 3–08 to claim their 14th championship title overall and a first title in 11 years.

== Results ==
=== Final ===
12 September 1982 Final	Loughgiel Shamrocks	5-09 - 3-08	McQuillan Ballycastle	Casement Park
