= 1988 Antrim Senior Hurling Championship =

Annual hurling competition season

- Champions: O'Donovan Rossa (14th title)
- Runners-up: Ruairí Óg, Cushendall

The 1987 Antrim Senior Hurling Championship was the 87th staging of the Antrim Senior Hurling Championship since its establishment by the Antrim County Board in 1901.

Ruairí Óg, Cushendall entered the championship as the defending champions.

The final was played on 2 October 1988 at Páirc Mac Uílín in Ballycastle, between O'Donovan Rossa and Ruairí Óg, Cushendall, in what was their second consecutive meeting in the final. O'Donovan Rossa won the match by 2–10 to 1–10 to claim their 14th championship title overall and a first title in 11 years.

== Results ==
=== Final ===
2 October 1988 Final	O'Donovan Rossa	2-10 - 1-10	Ruairí Óg, Cushendall	Páirc Mac Uílín
