= 1999 Antrim Senior Hurling Championship =

Annual hurling competition season

- Champions: Ruairí Óg, Cushendall (8th title); Conor McCambridge (captain)
- Runners-up: Cúchulains Dunloy; Gregory O'Kane (captain)

The 1999 Antrim Senior Hurling Championship was the 99th staging of the Antrim Senior Hurling Championship since its establishment by the Antrim County Board in 1901.

Cúchulains Dunloy entered the championship as the defending champions.

The final was played on 5 September 1999 at Casement Park in Belfast, between Ruairí Óg, Cushendall and Cúchulains Dunloy, in what was their first ever meeting in the final. Ruairí Óg, Cushendall won the match by 3–14 to 3–12 to claim their eighth championship title overall and a first title in three years.

== Results ==
=== Final ===
5 September 1999 Final	Ruairí Óg, Cushendall	3-14 - 3-12	Cúchulains Dunloy	Casement Park
