= 1972 Antrim Senior Hurling Championship =

Annual hurling competition season

- Champions: O'Donovan Rossa (11th title)
- Runners-up: St John's

The 1972 Antrim Senior Hurling Championship was the 72nd staging of the Antrim Senior Hurling Championship since its establishment by the Antrim County Board in 1901.

Loughgiel Shamrocks entered the championship as the defending champions.

The final was played on 17 September 1972 at Páirc Mac Uílín in Ballycastle, between O'Donovan Rossa and St John's, in what was their first ever meeting in the final. O'Donovan Rossa won the match by 2–15 to 3–11 to claim their 11th championship title overall and a first title in 12 years.

== Results ==
=== Final ===
| 17 September 1972 Final | O'Donovan Rossa | 2-15 - 3-11 | St John's | Páirc Mac Uílín |
