= 1983 Antrim Senior Hurling Championship =

Annual hurling competition season

- Champions: McQuillan Ballycastle (15th title)
- Runners-up: Loughgiel Shamrocks

The 1983 Antrim Senior Hurling Championship was the 83rd staging of the Antrim Senior Hurling Championship since its establishment by the Antrim County Board in 1901.

Loughgiel Shamrocks entered the championship as the defending champions.

The final was played on 28 August 1983 at Pearse Park in Dunloy, between McQuillan Ballycastle and Loughgiel Shamrocks, in what was their second consecutive meeting in the final. McQuillan Ballycastle won the match by 1–14 to 2–10 to claim a their 15th championship title overall and a first title in three years.

== Results ==
=== Final ===
| 28 August 1983 Final | McQuillan Ballycastle | 1-14 - 2-10 | Loughgiel Shamrocks | Pearse Park |
