= 2008 Antrim Senior Hurling Championship =

Annual hurling competition season

- Champions: Ruairí Óg, Cushendall (11th title)
- Runners-up: Loughgiel Shamrocks

The 2008 Antrim Senior Hurling Championship was the 108th staging of the Antrim Senior Hurling Championship since its establishment by the Antrim County Board in 1901.

Cuchullians Dunloy entered the championship as the defending champions.

The final was played on 28 September 2008 at Casement Park in Belfast, between Ruairí Óg, Cushendall and Loughgiel Shamrocks, in what was their fourth meeting in the final overall. Ruairí Óg, Cushendall won the match by 0–15 to 0–06 to claim their 11th championship title overall and a first title in two years. It was Loughgiel Shamrocks' sixth consecutive defeat in the final.

== Results ==
=== Final ===
28 September 2008 Final	Ruairí Óg, Cushendall	0-15 - 0-06	Loughgiel Shamrocks	Casement Park
