= 2012 Antrim Senior Hurling Championship =

Annual hurling competition season

- Champions: Loughgiel Shamrocks (18th title); Johnny Campbell (captain); P. J. O'Mullan (manager)
- Runners-up: Cuchullians Dunloy

The 2012 Antrim Senior Hurling Championship was the 112th staging of the Antrim Senior Hurling Championship since its establishment by the Antrim County Board in 1901.

Loughgiel Shamrocks entered the championship as the defending champions.

The final was played on 29 September 2012 at Casement Park in Belfast, between Loughgiel Shamrocks and Cuchullians Dunloy, in what was their fourth meeting in the final overall. Loughgiel Shamrocks the match by 1–11 to 1–07 to claim a record 18th championship title overall and a third consecutive title.

== Results ==
=== Final ===
| 29 September 2012 Final | Loughgiel Shamrocks | 1-11 - 1-07 | Cuchullians Dunloy | Casement Park |
