= 2013 Antrim Senior Hurling Championship =

Annual hurling competition season

The 2013 Antrim Senior Hurling Championship was the 113th staging of the Antrim Senior Hurling Championship since its establishment in 1901. The championship began on 4 August 2013 and is ended on 29 September 2013.

Loughgiel Shamrocks were the reigning champions, and successfully defended their title following a 3–14 to 2–6 defeat of Ruairí Óg, Cushendall.

== Results ==
=== Round 1 ===
4 August Round 1	St Gall's	2-6 - 3-27	Loughgiel Shamrocks	Páirc Lámh Dhearg
15:15				Referee: T Reilly

=== Quarter-finals ===
30 August Quarter-final	St Brigid's	0-6 - 0-21	Loughgiel Shamrocks	Pearse Park
18:45				Referee: A Kelly

1 September Quarter-final	St John's	0-10 - 1-19	Ruairí Óg, Cushendall	Páirc Lámh Dhearg
13:15				Referee: O Elliot

1 September Quarter-final	O'Donovan Rossa	0-8 - 1-14	Dunloy	Páirc Lámh Dhearg
14:45				Referee: M O'Neill

1 September Quarter-final	McQuillans	3-16 - 0-4	Glenariff Ossians	Páirc Mhuire
18:30				Referee: C McKnight

=== Semi-finals ===
21 September Semi-final	Ruairí Óg, Cushendall	1-18 - 2-10	Dunloy	Fr. Healy Park
14:45				Referee: O Elliot

22 September Semi-final	Loughgiel Shamrocks	2-20 - 1-9	McQuillans	Páirc Mhuire
14:00				Referee: G Duffy

=== Final ===
29 September Final	Loughgiel Shamrocks	3-14 - 2-6	Ruairí Óg, Cushendall	Ballycastle
15:30	B McCarry (2-1), L Watson (0-6, 5f), J Scullion (0-4), S Casey (1-0), M McFadden (0-1), T McCloskey (0-1), B McAuley (0-1).	Report	S McNaughton (1-0f), P McGill (1-0), C Carson (0-3), K McKeegan (0-2f), R McCambridge (0-1).	Referee: T Reilly

Round 1
Loughgiel Shamrocks	3-27
St Gall's	2-6

Quarter-finals
Loughgiel Shamrocks	0-21
St Brigid's	0-6
McQuillans	3-16
Glenariff Ossians	0-4
Ruairí Óg	1-19
St John's	0-10
Dunloy	1-14
O'Donovan Rossa	0-8

Semi-finals
Loughgiel Shamrocks	2-20
McQuillans	1-9
Ruairí Óg	1-18
Dunloy	2-10

Final
Loughgiel Shamrocks	3-14
Ruairí Óg	2-6
