= 2019 Antrim Senior Hurling Championship =

Annual hurling competition season

- Champions: Cúchulains Dunloy (13th title); Paul Shiels (captain); Gregory O'Kane (manager)
- Runners-up: Ruairí Óg, Cushendall; Paddy Burke (captain); Ciaran Kearney (manager)

The 2019 Antrim Senior Hurling Championship was the 119th staging of the Antrim Senior Hurling Championship since its establishment by the Antrim County Board in 1901.

Ruairí Óg, Cushendall entered the championship as the defending champions.

The final was played on 29 September 2019 at Páirc Mac Uílín in Ballycastle, between Cúchulains Dunloy and Ruairí Óg, Cushendall, in what was their fifth meeting in the final overall and a first meeting in the final in two years. Cúchulains Dunloy won the match by 3–16 to 2–15 to claim their 13th championship title overall and a first title in two years.

== Results ==
=== Final ===
29 September 2019 Final	Cúchulains Dunloy	3-16 - 2-15	Ruairí Óg, Cushendall	Pearse Park
	C Cunning 0-9 (7fs), S Elliott 2-0; N Elliott 1-2, K Molloy 0-2, N McKeague 0-1, E O'Neill 0-1, P Shiels 0-1.		N McManus 0-10 (8fs), F McCambridge 1-1, C McNaughton 1-0, A Delargy 0-1, P McGill 0-1, E Campbell 0-1, N McCormick 0-1.
