= 1994 Antrim Senior Hurling Championship =

Annual hurling competition season

- Champions: Cuchullians Dunloy (2nd title)
- Runners-up: St John's

The 1994 Antrim Senior Hurling Championship was the 94th staging of the Antrim Senior Hurling Championship since its establishment by the Antrim County Board in 1901.

Ruairí Óg, Cushendall entered the championship as the defending champions, however, they were beaten by St John's in the quarter-finals.

The final was played on 11 September 1994 at Casement Park in Belfast, between Cuchullians Dunloy and St John's, in what was their first ever meeting in the final. Cuchullians Dunloy won the match by 1–18 to 1–05 to claim their second championship title overall and a first title in four years.

== Results ==
=== Final ===
11 September 1994 Final	Cuchullians Dunloy	1-18 - 1-05	St John's	Casement Park
