= 2000 Antrim Senior Hurling Championship =

Annual hurling competition season

- Champions: Cuchullians Dunloy (6th title)
- Runners-up: Emmets Cushendun

The 2000 Antrim Senior Hurling Championship was the 100th staging of the Antrim Senior Hurling Championship since its establishment by the Antrim County Board in 1901.

Ruairí Óg, Cushendall entered the championship as the defending champions.

The final was played on 17 September 2000 at Casement Park in Belfast, between Cuchullians Dunloy and Emmets Cushendun, in what was their first ever meeting in the final. Cuchullians Dunloy won the match by 1–21 to 0–13 to claim their sixth championship title overall and a first title in two years.

== Results ==
=== Final ===
17 September 2000 Final	Cuchullians Dunloy	1-21 - 0-13	Emmets Cushendun	Casement Park
