= Gary O'Kane =

Irish hurler

Personal information
- Native name: Garraí Ó Catháin (Irish)
- Born: 23 January 1970 (age 56) Dunloy, County Antrim, Northern Ireland
- Occupation: Joiner
- Height: 5 ft 10 in (178 cm)

Sport
- Sport: Hurling
- Position: Left corner-back
Club
- Years: Club
- Dunloy
Club titles
- Antrim titles: 9
- Ulster titles: 8
- All-Ireland Titles: 0
Inter-county
- Years: County
- 1989-2000: Antrim
Inter-county titles
- Ulster titles: 8
- All-Irelands: 0
- NHL: 0
- All Stars: 0

Gary O'Kane (born 23 January 1970 in Dunloy, County Antrim, Northern Ireland) is an Irish retired sportsperson. He played hurling with his local club Dunloy and was a member of the Antrim senior inter-county team in the 1980s and 1990s.
