= James Black (hurler) =

Irish Gaelic sportsperson

Personal information
- Nickname: Rocket
- Born: 1992 (age 33–34) Carey, County Antrim

Sport
- Sport: Hurling
- Position: Left wing-forward
Club
- Years: Club
- 2010-present: Carey Faughs
Club titles
- Antrim titles: 2
- Ulster titles: 1
- All-Ireland Titles: 0
Inter-county
Years	County	Apps (scores)
2011-	Antrim	1 (0-00)
Inter-county titles
- Ulster titles: 0
- All-Irelands: 0
- NHL: 0
- All Stars: 0

James Black (born 25 July 1992 in Glenshesk, County Antrim) is an Irish sportsperson. He plays hurling with his local club Glenshesk, having previously played for Glenshesk (an amalgamation of the local Carey and Armoy clubs at underage level) and has been a member of the Antrim senior inter-county hurling team since 2011. An experienced pint man, he was deputy Head boy at his school of Cross and Passion College where he won two All Ireland O'Keefe Cup medals and captained the side in their 2011 Magean Cup Campaign.

An avid farmer he runs farms in both Carey and Scotland and holds a degree from University of Ulster in Sports Science.
