= 1973 Antrim Senior Hurling Championship =

Annual hurling competition season

- Champions: St John's (7th title); Seán Burns (captain)
- Runners-up: McQuillan Ballycastle; Eddie Donnelly (captain)

The 1973 Antrim Senior Hurling Championship was the 73rd staging of the Antrim Senior Hurling Championship since its establishment by the Antrim County Board in 1901.

O'Donovan Rossa entered the championship as the defending champions.

The final was played on 9 September 1973 at Pearse Park in Dunloy, between St John's and McQuillan Ballycastle, in what was their first meeting in the final in four years. St John's won the match by 4–10 to 3–12 to claim their seventh championship title overall and a first title in four years.

== Results ==
=== Final ===
9 September 1973 Final	St John's	4-10 - 3-12	McQuillan Ballycastle	Pearse Park
	A McCallin 2-5, J Gough 1-1, D Armstrong 1-1, H McCrory 0-2, K McFerran 0-1.		E Donnelly 2-7, S Donnelly 1-0, J Harkin 0-3, K Boyle 0-1, M Loughry 0-1.
