= 2009 Antrim Senior Hurling Championship =

Annual hurling competition season

- Champions: Cuchullians Dunloy (11th title)
- Runners-up: Ruairí Óg, Cushendall

The 2009 Antrim Senior Hurling Championship was the 109th staging of the Antrim Senior Hurling Championship since its establishment by the Antrim County Board in 1901.

Ruairí Óg, Cushendall entered the championship as the defending champions.

The final was played on 27 September 2009 at Casement Park in Belfast, between Cuchullians Dunloy and Ruairí Óg, Cushendall, in what was their third meeting in the final overall. Cuchullians Dunloy won the match by 3–14 to 1–13 to claim their 11th championship title overall and a first title in two years.

== Results ==
=== Final ===
27 September 2009 Final	Cuchullians Dunloy	3-14 - 1-13	Ruairí Óg, Cushendall	Casement Park
