= 1977 Antrim Senior Hurling Championship =

Annual hurling competition season

- Champions: O'Donovan Rossa (13th title)
- Runners-up: McQuillan Ballycastle

The 1977 Antrim Senior Hurling Championship was the 77th staging of the Antrim Senior Hurling Championship since its establishment by the Antrim County Board in 1901.

O'Donovan Rossa entered the championship as the defending champions.

The final was played on 28 August 1977 at Pearse Park in Dunloy, between O'Donovan Rossa and McQuillan Ballycastle, in what was their first meeting in the final in 20 years. O'Donovan Rossa won the match by 2–10 to 1–07 to claim their 13th championship title overall and a second consecutive title.

== Results ==
=== Final ===
28 August 1977 Final	O'Donovan Rossa	2-10 - 1-07	McQuillan Ballycastle	Pearse Park
