= 1970 Antrim Senior Hurling Championship =

Annual hurling competition season

- Champions: Loughgiel Shamrocks (12th title); Séamus Richmond (captain)
- Runners-up: McQuillan Ballycastle

The 1970 Antrim Senior Hurling Championship was the 70th staging of the Antrim Senior Hurling Championship since its establishment by the Antrim County Board in 1901.

St John's entered the championship as the defending champions.

The final was played on 1 November 1970 between Loughgiel Shamrocks and McQuillan Ballycastle, in what was their third meeting in the final overall. Loughgiel Shamrocks won the match by 8–09 to 4–08 to claim their 12th championship title overall and a first title in two years.

== Results ==
=== Final ===
1 November 1970 Final	Loughgiel Shamrocks	8-09 - 4-08	McQuillan Ballycastle
