= 1974 Antrim Senior Hurling Championship =

Annual hurling competition season

- Champions: Patrick Sarsfields (1st title)
- Runners-up: Loughgiel Shamrocks

The 1974 Antrim Senior Hurling Championship was the 74th staging of the Antrim Senior Hurling Championship since its establishment by the Antrim County Board in 1901.

St John's entered the championship as the defending champions.

The final was played on 8 September 1974 at Corrigan Park in Belfast, between Patrick Sarsfields and Loughgiel Shamrocks, in what was their first ever meeting in the final. Patrick Sarsfields won the match by 3–12 to 3–07 to claim their first ever championship title.

== Results ==
=== Final ===
8 September 1974 Final	Patrick Sarsfields	3-12 - 3-07	Loughgiel Shamrocks	Corrigan Park
