= 1971 Antrim Senior Hurling Championship =

Annual hurling competition season

- Champions: Loughgiel Shamrocks (13th title)
- Runners-up: Glenariffe Oisín

The 1971 Antrim Senior Hurling Championship was the 71st staging of the Antrim Senior Hurling Championship since its establishment by the Antrim County Board in 1901.

Loughgiel Shamrocks entered the championship as the defending champions.<

The final was played on 29 August 1971 at Páirc Mac Uílín in Ballycastle, between Loughgiel Shamrocks and Glenariffe Oisín, in what was their second meeting in the final overall. Loughgiel Shamrocks won the match by 4–11 to 1–03 to claim their 13th championship title overall and a second consecutive title.

== Results ==
=== Final ===
29 August 1971 Final	Loughgiel Shamrocks	4-11 - 1-03	Glenariffe Oisín	Páirc Mac Uílín
