= 1996 Antrim Senior Hurling Championship =

Annual hurling competition season

- Champions: Ruairí Óg, Cushendall (7th title)
- Runners-up: McQuillan Ballycastle

The 1996 Antrim Senior Hurling Championship was the 96th staging of the Antrim Senior Hurling Championship since its establishment by the Antrim County Board in 1901.

Cuchullians Dunloy entered the championship as the defending champions.

The final was played on 8 September 1996 at Casement Park in Belfast, between Ruairí Óg, Cushendall and McQuillan Ballycastle, in what was their seventh meeting in the final overall. Ruairí Óg, Cushendall won the match by 2–16 to 2–10 to claim their seventh championship title overall and a first title in three years.

== Results ==
=== Final ===
8 September 1996 Final	Ruairí Óg, Cushendall	2-16 - 2-10	McQuillan Ballycastle	Casement Park
