= 1987 Antrim Senior Hurling Championship =

Annual hurling competition season

- Champions: Ruairí Óg, Cushendall (3rd title)
- Runners-up: O'Donovan Rossa

The 1987 Antrim Senior Hurling Championship was the 87th staging of the Antrim Senior Hurling Championship since its establishment by the Antrim County Board in 1901.

McQuillan Ballycastle entered the championship as the defending champions.

The final was played on 27 September 1987 at Casement Park in Belfast, between Ruairí Óg, Cushendall and O'Donovan Rossa, in what was their first ever meeting in the final. Ruairí Óg, Cushendall won the match by 4–12 to 1–11 to claim their third championship title overall and a first title in two years.

== Results ==
=== Final ===
27 September 1987 Final	Ruairí Óg, Cushendall	4-12 - 1-11	O'Donovan Rossa	Casement Park
