= 2011 Antrim Senior Hurling Championship =

Annual hurling competition season

- Champions: Loughgiel Shamrocks (17th title); Johnny Campbell (captain); P. J. O'Mullan (manager)
- Runners-up: Ruairí Óg, Cushendall

The 2011 Antrim Senior Hurling Championship was the 111th staging of the Antrim Senior Hurling Championship since its establishment by the Antrim County Board in 1901.

Loughgiel Shamrocks entered the championship as the defending champions.

The final was played on 25 September 2011 at Casement Park in Belfast, between Loughgiel Shamrocks and Ruairí Óg, Cushendall, in what was their second consecutive meeting in the final. Loughgiel Shamrocks the match by 1–14 to 0–14 to claim a record-equalling 17th championship title overall and a second consecutive title.

== Results ==
=== Final ===
25 September 2011 Final	Loughgiel Shamrocks	1-14 - 0-14	Ruairí Óg, Cushendall	Casement Park
