= 2002 Antrim Senior Hurling Championship =

Annual hurling competition season

- Champions: Cuchullians Dunloy (8th title); Gary O'Kane (captain)
- Runners-up: Ruairí Óg, Cushendall

The 2002 Antrim Senior Hurling Championship was the 102nd staging of the Antrim Senior Hurling Championship since its establishment by the Antrim County Board in 1901.

Cuchullians Dunloy entered the championship as the defending champions.

The final was played on 6 October 2002 at Casement Park in Belfast, between Cuchullians Dunloy and Ruairí Óg, Cushendall, in what was their second meeting in the final overall. Cuchullians Dunloy won the match by 3–12 to 1–08 to claim their eighth championship title overall and a third consecutive title.

== Results ==
=== Final ===
6 October 2002 Final	Cuchullians Dunloy	3-12 - 1-08	Ruairí Óg, Cushendall	Casement Park
	M Curry 2-1, G O'Kane 0-5 (3f), L Richmond 0-3, E McKee 1-0, D Quinn 0-2, D McMullan 0-1 (f).	Report	A Delargy 0-3 (1f), C McCambridge 1-0, R McNaughton 0-2, J Carson, K McKeegan, B McNaughton 0-1.
