= 1989 Antrim Senior Hurling Championship =

Annual hurling competition season

- Champions: Loughgiel Shamrocks (15th title)
- Runners-up: St John's

The 1989 Antrim Senior Hurling Championship was the 89th staging of the Antrim Senior Hurling Championship since its establishment by the Antrim County Board in 1901.

O'Donovan Rossa entered the championship as the defending champions.

The final was played on 1 October 1989 at Casement Park in Belfast, between Loughgiel Shamrocks and St John's, in what was their third meeting in the final overall. Loughgiel Shamrocks won the match by 2–14 to 1–06 to claim their 15th championship title overall and a first title in seven years.

== Results ==
=== Final ===
1 October 1989 Final	Loughgiel Shamrocks	2-14 - 1-06	St John's	Casement Park
