= 1984 Antrim Senior Hurling Championship =

Annual hurling competition season

- Champions: McQuillan Ballycastle (16th title)
- Runners-up: Ruairí Óg, Cushendall

The 1984 Antrim Senior Hurling Championship was the 84th staging of the Antrim Senior Hurling Championship since its establishment by the Antrim County Board in 1901.

McQuillan Ballycastle entered the championship as the defending champions.

The final was played on 9 September 1984 at Pearse Park in Dunloy, between McQuillan Ballycastle and Ruairí Óg, Cushendall, in what was their first meeting in the final in three years. McQuillan Ballycastle won the match by 1–18 to 2–06 to claim a their 16th championship title overall and a second consecutive title.

== Results ==
=== Final ===
9 September 1984 Final	McQuillan Ballycastle	1-18 - 2-06	Ruairí Óg, Cushendall	Pearse Park
