= 1997 Antrim Senior Hurling Championship =

Annual hurling competition season

- Champions: Cuchullians Dunloy (4th title)
- Runners-up: O'Donovan Rossa

The 1997 Antrim Senior Hurling Championship was the 97th staging of the Antrim Senior Hurling Championship since its establishment by the Antrim County Board in 1901.

Ruairí Óg, Cushendall entered the championship as the defending champions.

The final was played on 31 August 1997 at Casement Park in Belfast, between Cuchullians Dunloy and O'Donovan Rossa, in what was their third meeting in the final overall. Cuchullians Dunloy won the match by 3–12 to 1–10 to claim their fourth championship title overall and a first title in two years.

== Results ==
=== Final ===
31 August 1997 Final	Cuchullians Dunloy	3-12 - 1-10	O'Donovan Rossa	Casement Park
