= 2001 Antrim Senior Hurling Championship =

Annual hurling competition season

- Champions: Cuchullians Dunloy (7th title)
- Runners-up: McQuillan Ballycastle

The 2001 Antrim Senior Hurling Championship was the 101st staging of the Antrim Senior Hurling Championship since its establishment by the Antrim County Board in 1901.

Cuchullians Dunloy entered the championship as the defending champions.

The final was played on 30 September 2001 at Casement Park in Belfast, between Cuchullians Dunloy and McQuillan Ballycastle, in what was their second meeting in the final overall. Cuchullians Dunloy won the match by 3–15 to 1–17 to claim their seventh championship title overall and a second consecutive title.

== Results ==
=== Final ===
30 September 2001 Final	Cuchullians Dunloy	3-15 - 1-17	McQuillan Ballycastle	Casement Park
	A Elliott 1-4, M Curry 1-3, Greg O'Kane 1-2, P McMullan 0-2, C McGuckian 0-1, Gary O'Kane 0-1, N Elliott 0-1, D McMullan 0-1.	Report	P McKillen 0-6, M Dallas 0-6, P McShane 1-1, P Coyles 0-2, C McAuley 0-1, K Kelly 0-1.
