= 1969 Antrim Senior Hurling Championship =

Annual hurling competition season

- Champions: St John's (6th title)
- Runners-up: McQuillan Ballycastle

The 1969 Antrim Senior Hurling Championship was the 69th staging of the Antrim Senior Hurling Championship since its establishment by the Antrim County Board in 1901.

Loughgiel Shamrocks entered the championship as the defending champions.

The final was played on 9 November 1969 at Fr Healy Park in Loughgiel, between St John's and McQuillan Ballycastle, in what was their first meeting in the final in 35 years. St John's won the match by 3–08 to 2–04 to claim their sixth championship title overall and a first title in four years.

== Results ==
=== Final ===
| 9 November 1969 Final | St John's | 3-08 - 0-04 | McQuillan Ballycastle | Pearse Park |
