= 1990 Antrim Senior Hurling Championship =

Annual hurling competition season

- Champions: Cuchullians Dunloy (1st title); Séamus McMullan (captain)
- Runners-up: O'Donovan Rossa

The 1990 Antrim Senior Hurling Championship was the 90th staging of the Antrim Senior Hurling Championship since its establishment by the Antrim County Board in 1901.

Loughgiel Shamrocks entered the championship as the defending champions.

The final, a replay, was played on 7 October 1990 at Casement Park in Belfast, between Cuchullians Dunloy and O'Donovan Rossa, in what was their second meeting in the final overall. Cuchullians Dunloy won the match by 2–10 to 1–10 to claim their first ever championship title.

== Results ==
=== Final ===
| 23 September 1990 Final | Cuchullians Dunloy | 1-14 - 3-08 | O'Donovan Rossa | Casement Park |

=== Final replay ===
| 7 October 1990 Final replay | Cuchullians Dunloy | 2-10 - 1-10 | O'Donovan Rossa | Casement Park |
