= 1979 Antrim Senior Hurling Championship =

Annual hurling competition season

- Champions: McQuillan Ballycastle (13th title)
- Runners-up: Ruairí Óg, Cushendall

The 1979 Antrim Senior Hurling Championship was the 79th staging of the Antrim Senior Hurling Championship since its establishment by the Antrim County Board in 1901.

McQuillan Ballycastle entered the championship as the defending champions.

The final was played on 9 September 1979 at Pearse Park in Dunloy, between McQuillan Ballycastle and Ruairí Óg, Cushendall, in what was their first ever meeting in the final. McQuillan Ballycastle won the match by 3–15 to 0–11 to claim their 13th championship title overall and a second consecutive title.

== Results ==
=== Final ===
| 9 September 1979 Final | McQuillan Ballycastle | 3-15 - 0-11 | Ruairí Óg, Cushendall | Pearse Park |
