= 1995 Antrim Senior Hurling Championship =

Annual hurling competition season

- Champions: Cuchullians Dunloy (3rd title)
- Runners-up: O'Donovan Rossa

The 1995 Antrim Senior Hurling Championship was the 95th staging of the Antrim Senior Hurling Championship since its establishment by the Antrim County Board in 1901.

Cuchullians Dunloy entered the championship as the defending champions.

The final was played on 10 September 1995 at Casement Park in Belfast, between Cuchullians Dunloy and O'Donovan Rossa, in what was their third meeting in the final overall. Cuchullians Dunloy won the match by 0–14 to 0–12 to claim their third championship title overall and a second consecutive title.

== Results ==
=== Final ===
| 10 September 1995 Final | Cuchullians Dunloy | 0-14 - 0-12 | O'Donovan Rossa | Casement Park |
