= 1975 Antrim Senior Hurling Championship =

Annual hurling competition season

- Champions: McQuillan Ballycastle (11th title)
- Runners-up: Patrick Sarsfields

The 1975 Antrim Senior Hurling Championship was the 75th staging of the Antrim Senior Hurling Championship since its establishment by the Antrim County Board in 1901.

Patrick Sarsfields entered the championship as the defending champions.

The final was played on 31 August 1975 between McQuillan Ballycastle and Patrick Sarsfields, in what was their first ever meeting in the final. McQuillan Ballycastle won the match by 3–14 to 2–10 to claim their 11th championship title overall and a first title in 11 years.

== Results ==
=== Final ===
31 August 1975 Final	McQuillan Ballycastle	3-14 - 2-10	Patrick Sarsfields
