= 2005–06 All-Ireland Intermediate Club Hurling Championship =

All Ireland Champions
- Winners: Dicksboro (1st win)
- Captain: David Carroll

All Ireland Runners-up
- Runners-up: Ballinhassig
- Captain: Martin Coleman

Provincial Champions
- Munster: Ballinhassig
- Leinster: Dicksboro
- Ulster: Glenariffe Oisín
- Connacht: Tommy Larkin's

The 2005–06 All-Ireland Intermediate Club Hurling Championship was the second staging of the All-Ireland Intermediate Club Hurling Championship since its establishment by the Gaelic Athletic Association in 2004.

The All-Ireland final was played on 12 February 2006 at Croke Park in Dublin, between Dicksboro from Kilkenny and Ballinhassig from Cork, in what was their first ever meeting in the final. Dicksboro won the match by 2-13 to 1-13 to claim their first All-Ireland title.

== Connacht Intermediate Club Hurling Championship ==
=== Connacht final ===
27 November 2005 Final	Tommy Larkins	2-21 - 0-14	Four Roads	Dunlo GAA Grounds

== Leinster Intermediate Club Hurling Championship ==
=== Leinster final ===
20 November 2005 Final	Dicksboro	0-20 - 0-03	Marshalstown	Nowlan Park
	E O'Donoghue 0-10, D O'Neill 0-3, P O'Flynn 0-2, A Barry 0-2, G Henderson 0-1, C O'Loughlin 0-1, D O'Mahony 0-1.		R Frayne 0-2, D O'Mahony 0-1.

== Munster Intermediate Club Hurling Championship ==
=== Munster quarter-final ===
13 November 2005 Quarter-final	Ballyduff Upper	3-13 - 0-14	Burgess	Castle Grounds
	B Hannon 2-6, P Kearney 1-2, J Kearney 0-3, S Kearney 0-1, A Martin 0-1.		T Scroop 0-8, D O'Brien 0-4, J Maher 0-2.	Referee: C McAllister (Cork)

=== Munster semi-finals ===
20 November 2005 Semi-final	Ballyduff Upper	1-20 - 2-09	Granagh-Ballingarry	Castle Grounds
	B Hannon 0-11, S Kearney 1-2, M Molumphy 0-3, J Twomey 0-1, P Kearney 0-1, S Feeney 0-1, J Kearney 0-1.		D O'Connor 1-5, M Clancy 1-1, D O'Grady 0-1, S Stapleton 0-1, B Hanley 0-1.

20 November 2005 Semi-final	Inagh	1-11 - 1-15	Ballinhassig	Wolfe Tone Park
	T Carmody 1-7, T Kelly 0-2, G Arthur 0-2.		D O'Callaghan 1-7, S Dineen 0-3, J Mullaney 0-2, D Brennan 0-1, P O'Sullivan 0-1, D Duggan 0-1.	Referee: N Cosgrove (Tipperary)

=== Munster final ===
27 November 2005 Final	Ballinhassig	1-12 - 0-13	Ballyduff Upper	Páirc Mac Gearailt
	D O'Callaghan 0-6, J Mullaney 0-4, P O'Sullivan 1-0, D O'Sullivan 0-1, D Brennan 0-1.		B Hannon 0-8, S Feeney 0-1, J Twomey 0-1, S Molumphy 0-1, B Kearney 0-1, J Kearney 0-1.	Referee: J Ryan (Tipperary)

== Ulster Intermediate Club Hurling Championship ==
=== Ulster semi-finals ===
16 October 2005 Semi-final	Glenariffe Oisín	4-17 - 1-09	Eoghan Ruadh Dungannonn

16 October 2005 Semi-final	Keady Lámh Dhearg	4-15 - 1-08	Eoghan Rua Coleraine	O'Neill Park

=== Ulster final ===
30 October 2005 Final	Glenariffe Oisín	0-16 - 0-15	Keady Lámh Dhearg	O'Neill Park

== All-Ireland Intermediate Club Hurling Championship ==
=== All-Ireland quarter-final ===
10 December 2005 Quarter-final	Fr. Murphy's	1-09 - 1-16	Ballinhassig	Emerald GAA Grounds
	M Harding 0-5, M Gordon 1-0, S Byrne 0-3, T Simms 0-1.	Report	D Dineen 0-7, D O'Callaghan 1-2, J Mullaney 0-2, T Coleman 0-2, D O'Sullivan 0-1, D Coleman 0-1, S Dineen 0-1.

=== All-Ireland semi-finals ===
29 January 2006 Semi-final	Ballinhassig	3-11 - 1-07	Glenariffe Oisín	Croke Park
	D O'Callaghan 2-2, P O'Sullivan 1-0, D Dineen 0-5, F O'Leary 0-2, D O'Sullivan 0-1, P Lombard 0-1	Report	J Macintosh 0-7, S Doherty 1-0	Referee: A Stapleton (Laois)

29 January 2006 Semi-final	Dicksboro	2-14 - 1-15	Tommy Larkins	Semple Stadium
	D O'Neill 1-2, E O'Donoghue 0-5, G Henderson 1-1, C O'Loughlin 0-3, D O'Gorman 0-2, B Barry 0-1.		A Garvey 0-7, M Fahy 1-0, K Hooban 0-2, D Kelly 0-2, M Rourke 0-1, T Kavanagh 0-1, N Kelly 0-1, D Brudar 0-1.	Referee: J Ryan (Tipperary)

=== All-Ireland final ===
12 February 2006 Final	Dicksboro	2-13 - 1-13	Ballinhassig	Croke Park
	E O'Donoghue 1-4, A Barry 1-2, B Barry 0-4, D O'Gorman 0-3.	Report	D Dineen 0-6, D O'Callaghan 1-2, J Mullaney 0-2, F O'Leary 0-2, P O'Sullivan 0-1.	Referee: P Green (Galway)
