= 1998 Antrim Senior Hurling Championship =

Annual hurling competition season

- Champions: Cuchullians Dunloy (5th title); B. Elliott (captain)
- Runners-up: McQuillan Ballycastle; P. Jennings (captain)

The 1998 Antrim Senior Hurling Championship was the 98th staging of the Antrim Senior Hurling Championship since its establishment by the Antrim County Board in 1901.

Cuchullians Dunloy entered the championship as the defending champions.

The final was played on 4 October 1998 at Casement Park in Belfast, between Cuchullians Dunloy and McQuillan Ballycastle, in what was their first ever meeting in the final. Cuchullians Dunloy won the match by 5–14 to 2–09 to claim their fifth championship title overall and a second consecutive title.

== Results ==
=== Final ===
4 October 1998 Final	Cuchullians Dunloy	5-14 - 2-09	O'Donovan Rossa	Casement Park
