= 1992 Antrim Senior Hurling Championship =

Annual hurling competition season

- Champions: Ruairí Óg, Cushendall (5th title)
- Runners-up: McQuillan Ballycastle

The 1992 Antrim Senior Hurling Championship was the 92nd staging of the Antrim Senior Hurling Championship since its establishment by the Antrim County Board in 1901.

Ruairí Óg, Cushendall entered the championship as the defending champions.

The final was played on 13 September 1992 at Casement Park in Belfast, between Ruairí Óg, Cushendall and McQuillan Ballycastle, in what was their fifth meeting in the final overall. Ruairí Óg, Cushendall won the match by 2–09 to 1–09 to claim their fifth championship title overall and a second consecutive title.

== Results ==
=== Final ===
13 September 1992 Final	Ruairí Óg, Cushendall	2-09 - 1-09	McQuillan Ballycastle	Casement Park
