= 2007 Antrim Senior Hurling Championship =

Annual hurling competition season

- Champions: Cuchullians Dunloy (10th title)
- Runners-up: Loughgiel Shamrocks

The 2007 Antrim Senior Hurling Championship was the 107th staging of the Antrim Senior Hurling Championship since its establishment by the Antrim County Board in 1901.

Ruairí Óg, Cushendall entered the championship as the defending champions.

The final was played on 7 October 2007 at Casement Park in Belfast, between Cuchullians Dunloy and Loughgiel Shamrocks, in what was their third meeting in the final overall. Cuchullians Dunloy won the match by 1–16 to 0–16 to claim their 10th championship title overall and a first title in four years.

== Results ==
=== Final ===
7 October 2007 Final	Cuchullians Dunloy	1-16 - 0-16	Loughgiel Shamrocks	Casement Park
