= 1993 Antrim Senior Hurling Championship =

Annual hurling competition season

- Champions: Ruairí Óg, Cushendall (6th title)
- Runners-up: McQuillan Ballycastle

The 1993 Antrim Senior Hurling Championship was the 93rd staging of the Antrim Senior Hurling Championship since its establishment by the Antrim County Board in 1901.

Ruairí Óg, Cushendall entered the championship as the defending champions.

The final was played on 12 September 1993 at Casement Park in Belfast, between Ruairí Óg, Cushendall and McQuillan Ballycastle, in what was their second consecutive meeting in the final. Ruairí Óg, Cushendall won the match by 1–18 to 1–07 to claim their sixth championship title overall and a third consecutive title.

== Results ==
=== Final ===
12 September 1993 Final	Ruairí Óg, Cushendall	1-18 - 1-07	McQuillan Ballycastle	Casement Park
