= 2017 Antrim Senior Hurling Championship =

Annual hurling competition season

- Dates: 12 August 2017 - 25 September 2017
- Teams: 9
- Sponsor: Bathshack
- Champions: Loughgiel Shamrocks

The 2017 Antrim Senior Hurling Championship is the 117th staging of the Antrim Senior Hurling Championship since its establishment by the Antrim County Board in 1901. The winners receive the Volunteer Cup.

Ruairí Óg, Cushendall won in 2016, defeating Loughgiel Shamrocks by 1–15 to 1-12

== Preliminary match ==
12 August 2017; 6:30 pm Preliminary round	Ruairí Óg, Cushendall	4-20 - 0-12	Clooney Gaels	Ballymena; Referee: Michael Hardy (Rasharkin)
12 August 2017; 6:30 pm Preliminary round	Neil McManus 0-11 (0-7f), Donal McNaughton 2-1, Paddy McGill and Sean McAfee 1-1 each, David Kearney and Emmett Laverty 0-2 each, Aidan McNaughton and Ryan Delargy 0-1 each	Report	PJ O’Connell 0-6 (0-5), James O’Connell 0-3 (0-1f), Owen Neeson 0-2, Fionnbar O’Neill 0-1	Ballymena; Referee: Michael Hardy (Rasharkin)

== Quarter-finals ==
26 August 2017; 5:00 pm Quarter-Final	Loughgiel Shamrocks	5-20 - 0-12	Creggan Kickhams	Dunloy; Referee: Michael Hardy (Rasharkin)
26 August 2017; 5:00 pm Quarter-Final		Report		Dunloy; Referee: Michael Hardy (Rasharkin)

26 August 2017; 7:00 pm Quarter-final	Ballycastle	1-15 - 1-13	O'Donovan Rossa	Dunloy; Referee: Colum Cunning (Dunloy)
26 August 2017; 7:00 pm Quarter-final		Report		Dunloy; Referee: Colum Cunning (Dunloy)

27 August 2017; 2:00 pm Quarter-final	Ruairí Óg, Cushendall	6-26 - 1-10	St Brigid's Cloughmills	Fr. Healy Park, Loughgiel; Referee: Owen Elliot (Ballymena)
27 August 2017; 2:00 pm Quarter-final		Report		Fr. Healy Park, Loughgiel; Referee: Owen Elliot (Ballymena)

27 August 2017; 5:00 pm Quarter-final	Dunloy	2-25 - 3-12	St John's	Fr. Healy Park, Loughgiel; Referee: Fiontann McCotter (Sarsfields)
27 August 2017; 5:00 pm Quarter-final		Report		Fr. Healy Park, Loughgiel; Referee: Fiontann McCotter (Sarsfields)

== Semi-finals ==
9 September 2017; 5:00 pm Semi-Final	Dunloy	2-21 - 0-10	Ballycastle	Ruairi Og Cushendall; Referee: Fionntan McCotter (Sarsfields)
9 September 2017; 5:00 pm Semi-Final		Report		Ruairi Og Cushendall; Referee: Fionntan McCotter (Sarsfields)

10 September 2017; 3:30 pm Semi-Final	Ruairí Óg, Cushendall	0-13 - 0-12	Loughgiel Shamrocks	Ballycastle; Referee: Colum Cunning (Dunloy)
10 September 2017; 3:30 pm Semi-Final		Report		Ballycastle; Referee: Colum Cunning (Dunloy)

== Final ==
24 September 2017; 3:15 pm Final	Ruairí Óg, Cushendall	2-9 - 2-15	Dunloy	Ballycastle; Referee: Mark O’Neill (Armoy)
24 September 2017; 3:15 pm Final		Report		Ballycastle; Referee: Mark O’Neill (Armoy)
