= 2003 Antrim Senior Hurling Championship =

Annual hurling competition season

- Champions: Cuchullians Dunloy (9th title)
- Runners-up: Loughgiel Shamrocks

The 2003 Antrim Senior Hurling Championship was the 103rd staging of the Antrim Senior Hurling Championship since its establishment by the Antrim County Board in 1901.

Cuchullians Dunloy entered the championship as the defending champions.

The final was played on 5 October 2003 at Casement Park in Belfast, between Cuchullians Dunloy and Loughgiel Shamrocks, in what was their second meeting in the final overall. Cuchullians Dunloy won the match by 1–16 to 2–12 to claim their ninth championship title overall and a record fourth consecutive title.

== Results ==
=== Final ===
5 October 2003 Final	Cuchullians Dunloy	1-16 - 2-12	Loughgiel Shamrocks	Casement Park
	Greg O'Kane 0-10 (6f), L Richmond 0-2, A Elliott 1-1, Gary O'Kane, M Curry, P Richmond 0-1 each.	Report	L Watson 1-8 (1-5f), B McGarry 0-4, S McGarry 1-0.
