= 1985 Antrim Senior Hurling Championship =

Annual hurling competition season

- Champions: Ruairí Óg, Cushendall (2nd title)
- Runners-up: Loughgiel Shamrocks

The 1985 Antrim Senior Hurling Championship was the 85th staging of the Antrim Senior Hurling Championship since its establishment by the Antrim County Board in 1901.

McQuillan Ballycastle entered the championship as the defending champions.

The final was played on 9 September 1985 at Fr Maginn Park in Glenravel, between Ruairí Óg, Cushendall and Loughgiel Shamrocks, in what was their first ever meeting in the final. Ruairí Óg, Cushendall won the match by 4–13 to 1–12 to claim their second championship title overall and a first title in four years.

== Results ==
=== Final ===
13 September 1981 Final	Ruairí Óg, Cushendall	4-13 - 1-12	Loughgiel Shamrocks	Fr Maginn Park
