= 2006 Antrim Senior Hurling Championship =

Annual hurling competition season

- Champions: Ruairí Óg, Cushendall (10th title); Aidan Delargy (captain); Michael McCambridge (captain); Fergus McAllister (manager)
- Runners-up: Loughgiel Shamrocks

The 2006 Antrim Senior Hurling Championship was the 106th staging of the Antrim Senior Hurling Championship since its establishment by the Antrim County Board in 1901.

Ruairí Óg, Cushendall entered the championship as the defending champions.

The final was played on 15 October 2006 at Casement Park in Belfast, between Ruairí Óg, Cushendall and Loughgiel Shamrocks, in what was their second consecutive meeting in the final. Ruairí Óg, Cushendall won the match by 2–14 to 2–07 to claim their 10th championship title overall and a second title in succession.

== Results ==
=== Final ===
15 October 2006 Final	Ruairí Óg, Cushendall	2-14 - 2-07	Loughgiel Shamrocks	Casement Park
	C McCambridge 0-7 (4f, 1 pen), N McManus 1-2, S McNaughton 1-1, A Delargy 0-2; E McKillop, B Delargy 0-1 each.	Report	L Watson 1-4 (1 '65', 3f), E McCloskey (1-0), J Scullion 0-2 (1 s/l, 1f), J Campbell 0-1.
