= 1980 Antrim Senior Hurling Championship =

Annual hurling competition season

- Champions: McQuillan Ballycastle (14th title)
- Runners-up: Ruairí Óg, Cushendall

The 1980 Antrim Senior Hurling Championship was the 80th staging of the Antrim Senior Hurling Championship since its establishment by the Antrim County Board in 1901.

McQuillan Ballycastle entered the championship as the defending champions.

The final was played on 28 September 1980 at Casement Park in Belfast, between McQuillan Ballycastle and Ruairí Óg, Cushendall, in what was their second consecutive meeting in the final. McQuillan Ballycastle won the match by 4–11 to 2–08 to claim a record 14th championship title overall and a third consecutive title.

== Results ==
=== Final ===
28 September 1980 Final	McQuillan Ballycastle	4-11 - 2-08	Ruairí Óg, Cushendall	Casement Park
