= 1981 Antrim Senior Hurling Championship =

Annual hurling competition season

- Dates: 9 August – 3 October 1981
- Teams: 7
- Champions: Ruairí Óg, Cushendall (1st title)
- Runners-up: McQuillan Ballycastle

The 1981 Antrim Senior Hurling Championship was the 81st staging of the Antrim Senior Hurling Championship since its establishment by the Antrim County Board in 1901. The championship ran from 9 August to 3 October 1981.

McQuillan Ballycastle entered the championship as the defending champions.

The final, a replay, was played on 3 October 1981 at Fr Healy Park in Loughguile, between Ruairí Óg, Cushendall and McQuillan Ballycastle, in what was their third consecutive meeting in the final. Ruairí Óg, Cushendall won the match by 3–08 to 0–16 to claim their first ever championship title.

== Results ==
=== Final ===
13 September 1981 Final	Ruairí Óg, Cushendall	1-13 - 2-10	McQuillan Ballycastle	Fr Healy Park

=== Final replay ===
3 October 1981 Final replay	Ruairí Óg, Cushendall	3-08 - 0-16	McQuillan Ballycastle	Fr Healy Park
