= Glenariffe Oisín CLG =

Gaelic sports club in Northern Ireland

Glenariffe Oisín
- Oisín Gleann Airimh
- Founded: 1904
- County: Antrim
- Nickname: Oisín's
- Colours
- Grounds: McAllister & McVeigh Memorial Park

Playing kits
Standard colours

Senior Club Championships
| | All Ireland | Ulster champions | Antrim champions |
|---|---|---|---|
| Hurling: | 0 | 0 | 2 |

Glenariffe Oisín CLG is a Gaelic Athletic Association club in Waterfoot, County Antrim, Northern Ireland. The club is affiliated to the Antrim County Board and is exclusively concerned with the game of hurling.

== History ==
Located in the village of Waterfoot, about 20 miles from Ballymena in the Glens of Antrim, Glenariffe Oisín GAA Club was founded in 1904. Prior to this, hurling had been played in the area by two separate clubs. After being donated a set of jerseys and hurleys, the club's first recorded championship appearance was in 1906.

Glenariffe Oisín had its first major success in 1935, when the Antrim SHC title was claimed for the first time in their history. The club won their second Antrim SHC title two years later. Over 50 years past before Glenariffe Oisín had their next success when the club won the Antrim IHC title. Further titles in this grade were won in 2000 and 2025.

== Grounds ==
Glenariffe Oisín's home ground, McAllister & McVeigh Memorial Park, was officially opened in 1947. It is named after the two IRA volunteers, Charlie McAllister and Pat McVeigh, who were killed during a gunfight with B-Specials in May 1922.

== Honours ==
- Antrim Senior Hurling Championship (2): 1935, 1937
- Ulster Intermediate Club Hurling Championship (1): 2005
- Antrim Intermediate Hurling Championship (2): 1988, 2000, 2025
