= P. J. O'Mullan =

Irish hurler and manager

P. J. O'Mullan (born 1974) is an Irish hurling manager and former player.

Born in Loughguile, County Antrim, O'Mullan was introduced to hurling by his father, a long-serving selector and administrator with the local club team. He became involved at underage levels with the Loughgiel Shamrocks club. O'Mullan's senior club career coincided with a lean period for Loughgiel Shamrocks.

After being involved in team management and coaching in all grades at club level with Loughgiel Shamrocks, O'Mullan enjoyed his greatest successes at senior level. A one-time All-Ireland-winning manager, he also won four Ulster titles and four championship titles. O'Mullan enjoyed a brief but unsuccessful tenure as manager of the Antrim senior team.

Achievements
| Preceded by Micheál Donoghue (Clarinbridge) | All-Ireland Senior Club Hurling Final winning manager 2012 | Succeeded by John Burke (St. Thomas') |
Sporting positions
| Preceded by Kevin Ryan | Antrim Senior Hurling Manager; 2015-2016 | Succeeded by Terence McNaughton; Dominic McKinley |
