= Gregory O'Kane =

Irish hurler and coach

Personal information
- Native name: Gréagóir Ó Catháin (Irish)
- Born: 1972 (age 53–54) Dunloy, County Antrim

Sport
- Sport: Hurling
- Position: Full-forward
Club
- Years: Club
- 1989-present: Dunloy
Club titles
- Antrim titles: 11
- Ulster titles: 10
- All-Ireland Titles: 0
Inter-county
- Years: County
- 1991-2005: Antrim
Inter-county titles
- Ulster titles: 8
- All-Irelands: 0
- NHL: 0
- All Stars: 0

Gregory O'Kane (born 1972) is an Irish former hurler who is the current coach of the Antrim senior hurling team.

O'Kane made his first appearance as a player for the Antrim team during the 1991 championship and was a regular player in the forwards until his retirement following the conclusion of the 2005 championship. During that time he won eight Ulster winners' medals.

At club level O'Kane is a ten-time Ulster club winners' medalist with Dunloy. He has also won eleven county club championship winners' medals.
