= Patrick Sarsfields GAA =

Antrim-based Gaelic games club

Patrick Sarsfields
- Pádraig Sáirséil CLG
- Founded: 1906
- County: Antrim
- Colours: Green and Black
- Grounds: Patrick Sarsfields Youth Club ("The Bear Pit"), 25a Stewartstown Avenue, Belfast
- Coordinates: 54.574117°N 6.008646°W

Playing kits
Standard colours

Senior Club Championships
	All Ireland	Ulster champions	Antrim champions
Football:	-	-	4
Hurling:	-	-	1

Patrick Sarsfields Gaelic Athletic Association is a Gaelic football, hurling, camogie and ladies' Gaelic football club based in West Belfast, County Antrim, Northern Ireland.

Location of Patrick Sarsfields GAA in Belfast

== History ==
Patrick Sarsfields were founded on 6 October 1906 and were named after the Jacobite leader Patrick Sarsfield, 1st Earl of Lucan (c. 1660 – 1693).

In hurling, they have only won the county championship once, in 1974. That year they reached the final of the Ulster Senior Club Hurling Championship, losing to Ballycran.

The Gaelic football team have been county champions four times, most recently in 1985.

The club attracted media attention in 2016 after two Syrian refugee children, Ahmed and Renad Soda, were stars of their underage teams.

== Honours ==
=== Gaelic football ===
- Antrim Senior Football Championship (4): 1913, 1941, 1967, 1985
- Antrim Senior Football League (8): 1911, 1912, 1913, 1914, 1962, 1969, 1974, 1985
- Antrim Intermediate Football Championship (1): 1995
- Antrim Intermediate Football League (3): 1935, 1936, 2025
- Antrim Junior Football Championship (5): 1940, 2017
- Beringer Cup (2): 1955, 2006
- Antrim Minor Football Championship (2): 1963, 1985

=== Hurling ===
- Antrim Senior Hurling Championship (1): 1974
- Antrim Senior Hurling League (3): 1930s
- Antrim Intermediate Hurling Championship (2): 1972, 2017
- Antrim Junior Hurling Championship (1): 2026
- Antrim Minor Hurling Championship (2): 1930, 1932
- South Antrim Hurling League (4): 1949, 1956, 1958, 2021
- South Antrim Junior Hurling Championship (4): 1941, 1944, 1953, 1984
