= Antrim Senior Hurling Championship =

Annual hurling competition

- Current season or competition: 2026 Antrim Senior Hurling Championship
- Irish: Craobh Iomána Sinsir Aontroma
- Code: Hurling
- Founded: 1901; 125 years ago
- Region: Antrim (GAA)
- Trophy: Volunteer Cup
- No. of teams: 8
- Title holders: Dunloy (17th title)
- Most titles: Loughgiel Shamrocks (20 titles)
- Sponsors: Bathshack
- TV partner: TG4
- Official website: Antrim GAA

The Antrim Senior Hurling Championship (known for sponsorship reasons as the Bathshack.com Antrim Senior Hurling Championship and abbreviated to the Antrim SHC) is an annual club hurling competition organised by the Antrim County Board of the Gaelic Athletic Association. It is contested by the top-ranking senior clubs in the county of Antrim, with the winners decided through a group and knockout format. It is the most prestigious competition in Antrim hurling.

In its present format, the eight teams are drawn into two groups of four teams and play each other in a single round-robin system. The two group winners proceed to the knockout phase that culminates with the final. The winner of the Antrim Senior Championship, as well as being presented with the Volunteer Cup, qualifies for the subsequent Ulster Club Championship.

The competition has been won by 19 teams, 15 of which have won it more than once. Loughgiel Shamrocks is the most successful team in the tournament's history, having won it 20 times. Dunloy are the current champions, defeating Ruairí Óg Cushendall by 1-19 to 1-13 in the 2026 final.

== Format ==
=== Group stage ===
The 8 teams are divided into two groups of four. Over the course of the group stage, each team plays once against the others in the group, resulting in each team being guaranteed at least three group games. Two points are awarded for a win, one for a draw and zero for a loss. The teams are ranked in the group stage table by points gained, then scoring difference and then their head-to-head record. The top three teams in each group qualify for the knock-out stage.

=== Knockout stage ===
Following the completion of the group stage, the top two teams from each group receive byes to separate semi-finals.

Quarter-finals: Teams that finished 2nd and 3rd in the group stage contest this round. The two 2nd placed teams play the 3rd placed teams from the opposite group. The two winners from these two games advance to the semi-finals.

Semi-finals: The two quarter-final winners and the two group winners contest this round. The two winners from these two games advance to the final.

Final: The two semi-final winners contest the final. The winning team are declared champions.

=== Relegation ===
At the end of the championship, two 4th-placed teams from the group stage take play-off, with the losing team being relegated to the Antrim Intermediate Hurling Championship.

=== Qualification ===
The winners of the Antrim Senior Hurling Championship progress to the Ulster Senior Club Hurling Championship.

=== The Volunteer Cup ===
The Association of Pre-Truce Old I.R.A. in Belfast was wound up in the late 1950’s. They had approximately £1300 in funds. Their Commanding Officer in charge at the time was Jimmy McCreaely who although a qualified teacher was never permitted to teach officially in the Six Counties as he refused to take the Oath of Allegiance.

He worked a lifetime in Belfast with Torney Brothers—Fruit Importers in charge of what was known as “The Banana House.” He did however help the Christian Brothers on occasions. At his instigation it was decided to use the £1300 to purchase a Memorial Cup for presentation to Belfast schools as a trophy for inter-schools competition in hurling.

The Cup was made in Limerick of pure Irish silver and had a fragment of the Treaty Stone embedded in it. It was contained in a glass and mahogany show case. Called the Volunteer Cup it is now irreplaceable as Irish Silver is no longer produced.

The Cup was first played for in 1961 when St. Mary’s opposed St. Malachy’s for the Under 15 Championship. St. Malachy’s gained victory by a margin of one point. Playing on that St. Mary’s team were Oliver Kelly, the present Antrim County Chairman; Eamonn Hamill of Rossa and Joe McCallion of Ardoyne while P. J. Hill of Carey Faughs was a member of the St. Malachy’s team. In 1967 the Belfast Schools Committee decided to present the Cup to Brian Moore of the Antrim County Board as a hurling trophy.

The Volunteer Cup was then played for at Senior Club level in 1968 when Loughgiel met and defeated Rossa at Casement Park. The Cup was presented to Loughgiel’s Captain, Neil McMullan by Mr. John Cullen, Secretary of the Third Northern Division Pre-Truce I.R.A. (1916–’23).

== Teams ==
=== 2026 teams ===
The 8 teams competing in the 2026 Antrim Senior Hurling Championship were:

Club	Location	Colours	Position in 2025	In championship since	Championship titles	Last championship title
Dunloy	Dunloy	Green and yellow	Champions	?	17	2026
Glenariffe Oisín	Glenariff	Green, white and gold	Semi-finals	2026	2	1937
Loughgiel Shamrocks	Loughguile	Red and white	Semi-finals	?	20	2016
McQuillan Ballycastle	Ballycastle	Black and amber	Quarter-finals	?	17	1986
O'Donovan Rossa	Belfast	Royal Blue, Saffron and White	Group stage	?	15	2004
Ruairí Óg	Cushendall	Maroon and white	Runners-up	?	16	2024
St Enda's	Glengormley	Amber and black	Group stage	?	0	—
St John's	Belfast	Blue and white	Quarter-finals	?	8	2025

== Qualification for subsequent competitions ==
The Antrim Senior Championship winners qualify for the subsequent Ulster Senior Club Hurling Championship.

== Roll of honour ==
=== By club ===
#	Club	Titles	Runners-up	Championships won	Championships runner-up
1	Loughgiel Shamrocks	20	21	1920, 1924, 1925, 1929, 1938, 1943, 1956, 1963, 1966, 1967, 1968, 1970, 1971, 1982, 1989, 2010, 2011, 2012, 2013, 2016	1926, 1928, 1954, 1958, 1960, 1962, 1964, 1965, 1974, 1983, 1985, 2003, 2004, 2005, 2006, 2007, 2008, 2018, 2020, 2023, 2025
2	McQuillan Ballycastle	17	20	1913, 1914, 1933, 1944, 1948, 1950, 1952, 1953, 1954, 1964, 1975, 1978, 1979, 1980, 1983, 1984, 1986	1909, 1910, 1912, 1915, 1932, 1934, 1955, 1957, 1969, 1970, 1973, 1977, 1981, 1982, 1992, 1993, 1996, 1998, 2001, 2015
2	Dunloy	17	8	1990, 1994, 1995, 1997, 1998, 2000, 2001, 2002, 2003, 2007, 2009, 2017, 2019, 2020, 2021, 2022, 2026	1911, 1930, 1939, 1963, 1976, 1999, 2012, 2024
4	Ruairí Óg	16	14	1981, 1985, 1987, 1991, 1992, 1993, 1996, 1999, 2005, 2006, 2008, 2014, 2015, 2018, 2023, 2024	1979, 1980, 1984, 1988, 2002, 2009, 2010, 2011, 2013, 2016, 2017, 2019, 2022, 2026
5	O'Donovan Rossa	15	9	1918, 1919, 1921, 1946, 1949, 1955, 1957, 1958, 1959, 1960, 1972, 1976, 1977, 1988, 2004	1924, 1953, 1956, 1968, 1987, 1990, 1995, 1997, 2021
6	O'Connells	9	3	1927, 1928, 1930, 1932, 1936, 1940, 1941, 1942, 1945	1929, 1931, 1942
7	St John's	8	6	1934, 1951, 1961, 1962, 1965, 1969, 1973, 2025	1972, 1978, 1986, 1989, 1991, 1994
8	Seagan An Diomais	3	2	1908, 1910, 1915	1913, 1933
8	Carey Faughs	3	2	1906, 1916, 1923	1959, 1961
8	Mitchels	3	2	1911, 1912, 1947	1944, 1967
8	Tír na nÓg, Randalstown	3	0	1922, 1926, 1939	—
12	Glenariffe Oisín	2	3	1935, 1937	1938, 1966, 1971
12	O’Neill Crowley's	2	1	1903, 1907	1906
12	Tír na nÓg, Belfast	2	0	1904, 1905	—
12	Brian Oge	2	0	1901, 1909	—
16	Robert Emmets	1	1	1931	2000
16	Patrick Sarsfields	1	1	1974	1975
16	Lámh Dhearg	1	0	1902	—
16	James Stephens	1	0	1917	—
20	St Gall's	0	1	—	2014

=== Notes ===
- Runners-up unknown: 1901–1905, 1907–1908, 1914, 1916–1923, 1925, 1927, 1935–1937, 1940–1942, 1945–1952.

== List of finals ==
=== Legend ===
- Gold – All-Ireland senior club champions
- Silver – All-Ireland senior club runners-up

=== List of Antrim SHC finals ===
Year	Winners		Runners-up		Venue
Year	Club	Score	Club	Score	Venue
2026	Cuchullians, Dunloy	1-19	Ruairí Óg, Cushendall	1-13	Páirc MacUílín, Ballycastle
2025	St John's	2-16	Loughgiel Shamrocks	1-18	Páirc MacUílín, Ballycastle
2024	Ruairí Óg, Cushendall	1-16	Cuchullians, Dunloy	2-12	Páirc MacUílín, Ballycastle
2023	Ruairí Óg, Cushendall	1-20	Loughgiel Shamrocks	1-19	Corrigan Park, Belfast
2022	Cuchullians, Dunloy	1-20	Ruairí Óg, Cushendall	2-11	Corrigan Park, Belfast
2021	Cuchullians, Dunloy	3-23	O'Donovan Rossa	1-14	Corrigan Park, Belfast
2020	Cuchullians, Dunloy	2-20	Loughgiel Shamrocks	2-13	Páirc MacUílín, Ballycastle
2019	Cuchullians, Dunloy	3-16	Ruairí Óg, Cushendall	2-15	Páirc MacUílín, Ballycastle
2018	Ruairí Óg, Cushendall	2-12	Loughgiel Shamrocks	0-15	Páirc MacUílín, Ballycastle
2017	Cuchullians, Dunloy	2-15	Ruairí Óg, Cushendall	2-09	Páirc MacUílín, Ballycastle
2016	Loughgiel Shamrocks	1-15	Ruairí Óg, Cushendall	1-12	Páirc MacUílín, Ballycastle
2015	Ruairí Óg, Cushendall	2-16	McQuillan Ballycastle	1-15	Pearse Park, Dunloy
2014	Ruairí Óg, Cushendall	1-15	St Gall's	1-05	Páirc MacUílín, Ballycastle
2013	Loughgiel Shamrocks	3-14	Ruairí Óg, Cushendall	2-06	Páirc MacUílín, Ballycastle
2012	Loughgiel Shamrocks	1-11	Cuchullians, Dunloy	1-07	Casement Park, Belfast
2011	Loughgiel Shamrocks	1-14	Ruairí Óg, Cushendall	0-14	Casement Park, Belfast
2010	Loughgiel Shamrocks	1-09	Ruairí Óg, Cushendall	0-11	Casement Park, Belfast
2009	Cuchullians, Dunloy	3-14	Ruairí Óg, Cushendall	1-13	Casement Park, Belfast
2008	Ruairí Óg, Cushendall	0-15	Loughgiel Shamrocks	0-06	Casement Park, Belfast
2007	Cuchullians, Dunloy	1-16	Loughgiel Shamrocks	0-16	Casement Park, Belfast
2006	Ruairí Óg, Cushendall	2-14	Loughgiel Shamrocks	2-07	Casement Park, Belfast
2005	Ruairí Óg, Cushendall	2-10	Loughgiel Shamrocks	0-15	Casement Park, Belfast
2004	O'Donovan Rossa	1-14	Loughgiel Shamrocks	2-04	Casement Park, Belfast
2003	Cuchullians, Dunloy	1-16	Loughgiel Shamrocks	2-12	Casement Park, Belfast
2002	Cuchullians, Dunloy	3-12	Ruairí Óg, Cushendall	1-08	Casement Park, Belfast
2001	Cuchullians, Dunloy	3-15	McQuillan Ballycastle	1-17	Casement Park, Belfast
2000	Cuchullians, Dunloy	1-21	Robert Emmets	0-13	Casement Park, Belfast
1999	Ruairí Óg, Cushendall	3-17	Cuchullians, Dunloy	3-15	Casement Park, Belfast
1998	Cuchullians, Dunloy	5-14	McQuillan Ballycastle	2-09	Casement Park, Belfast
1997	Cuchullians, Dunloy	3-12	O'Donovan Rossa	1-10	Casement Park, Belfast
1996	Ruairí Óg, Cushendall	2-16	McQuillan Ballycastle	2-10	Casement Park, Belfast
1995	Cuchullians, Dunloy	0-14	O'Donovan Rossa	0-12	Casement Park, Belfast
1994	Cuchullians, Dunloy	1-18	St John's	1-05	Casement Park, Belfast
1993	Ruairí Óg, Cushendall	1-18	McQuillan Ballycastle	1-07	Casement Park, Belfast
1992	Ruairí Óg, Cushendall	2-09	McQuillan Ballycastle	1-09	Casement Park, Belfast
1991	Ruairí Óg, Cushendall	1-05	St John's	0-07	Casement Park, Belfast
1990	Cuchullians, Dunloy	1-14	O'Donovan Rossa	3-08	Casement Park, Belfast
Replay	Cuchullians, Dunloy	2-10	O'Donovan Rossa	1-10	Casement Park, Belfast
1989	Loughgiel Shamrocks	2-14	St John's	1-06	Casement Park, Belfast
1988	O'Donovan Rossa	2-10	Ruairí Óg, Cushendall	1-10	Casement Park, Belfast
1987	Ruairí Óg, Cushendall	4-12	O'Donovan Rossa	1-11	Casement Park, Belfast
1986	McQuillan Ballycastle	1-20	St John's	0-07	Pearse Park, Dunloy
1985	Ruairí Óg, Cushendall	4-13	Loughgiel Shamrocks	1-12	Fr Maginn Park
1984	McQuillan Ballycastle	1-18	Ruairí Óg, Cushendall	2-06	Pearse Park, Dunloy
1983	McQuillan Ballycastle	1-14	Loughgiel Shamrocks	2-10	Pearse Park, Dunloy
1982	Loughgiel Shamrocks	5-09	McQuillan Ballycastle	3-08	Casement Park, Belfast
1981	Ruairí Óg, Cushendall	1-13	McQuillan Ballycastle	2-10	Fr Healy Park
Replay	Ruairí Óg, Cushendall	3-08	McQuillan Ballycastle	0-16	Fr Healy Park
1980	McQuillan Ballycastle	4-11	Ruairí Óg, Cushendall	2-08	Casement Park, Belfast
1979	McQuillan Ballycastle	3-15	Ruairí Óg, Cushendall	0-11	Pearse Park, Dunloy
1978	McQuillan Ballycastle	2-11	St John's	1-06	Casement Park, Belfast
1977	O'Donovan Rossa	2-10	McQuillan Ballycastle	1-07	Pearse Park, Dunloy
1976	O'Donovan Rossa	3-17	Cuchullians, Dunloy	0-12	Casement Park, Belfast
1975	McQuillan Ballycastle	3-14	Patrick Sarsfields	2-10	
1974	Patrick Sarsfields	3-12	Loughgiel Shamrocks	3-07	Corrigan Park
1973	St John's	4-10	McQuillan Ballycastle	3-12	Pearse Park, Dunloy
1972	O'Donovan Rossa	2-15	St John's	3-11	Páirc Mac Uílín
1971	Loughgiel Shamrocks	4-11	Glenariffe Oisín	1-03	Páirc Mac Uílín
1970	Loughgiel Shamrocks	8-09	McQuillan Ballycastle	4-08	
1969	St John's	3-08	McQuillan Ballycastle	2-04	Pearse Park, Dunloy
1968	Loughgiel Shamrocks		O'Donovan Rossa		
1967	Loughgiel Shamrocks		Mitchel's		
1966	Loughgiel Shamrocks		Glenariffe Oisín		
1965	St John's		Loughgiel Shamrocks		
1964	McQuillan Ballycastle		Loughgiel Shamrocks		
1963	Loughgiel Shamrocks		Cuchullians, Dunloy		
1962	St John's		Loughgiel Shamrocks		
1961	St John's		Carey Faughs		
1960	O'Donovan Rossa		Loughgiel Shamrocks		
1959	O'Donovan Rossa		Carey Faughs		
1958	O'Donovan Rossa		Loughgiel Shamrocks		
1957	O'Donovan Rossa		McQuillan Ballycastle		
1956	Loughgiel Shamrocks		O'Donovan Rossa		
1955	O'Donovan Rossa		McQuillan Ballycastle		
1954	McQuillan Ballycastle		Loughgiel Shamrocks		
1953	McQuillan Ballycastle		O'Donovan Rossa		
1952	McQuillan Ballycastle				
1951	St John's				
1950	McQuillan Ballycastle		Loughgiel Shamrocks		
1949	O'Donovan Rossa				
1948	McQuillan Ballycastle				
1947	Mitchel's				
1946	O'Donovan Rossa				
1945	O'Connell's				
1944	McQuillan Ballycastle		Mitchel's		
1943	Loughgiel Shamrocks		O'Connell's		
1942	O'Connell's				
1941	O'Connell's				
1940	O'Connell's				
1939	Tír na nÓg, Randalstown		Cuchullians, Dunloy		
1938	Loughgiel Shamrocks		Glenariffe Oisín		
1937	Glenariffe Oisín				
1936	O'Connell's				
1935	Glenariffe Oisín				
1934	St John's		McQuillan Ballycastle		
1933	McQuillan Ballycastle		Seagan an Doimis		
1932	O'Connell's		McQuillan Ballycastle		
1931	Robert Emmets		O'Connell's		
1930	O'Connell's		Cuchullians, Dunloy		
1929	Loughgiel Shamrocks		O'Connell's		
1928	O'Connell's		Loughgiel Shamrocks		
1927	O'Connell's				
1926	Tír na nÓg, Randalstown		Loughgiel Shamrocks		
1925	Loughgiel Shamrocks				
1924	Loughgiel Shamrocks	33	O'Donovan Rossa	14	
1923	Carey Faughs				
1922	Tír na nÓg, Randalstown				
1921	O'Donovan Rossa				
1920	Loughgiel Shamrocks				
1919	O'Donovan Rossa				
1918	O'Donovan Rossa				
1917	James Stephens				
1916	Carey Faughs				
1915	Seagan an Doimis		McQuillan Ballycastle		
1914	McQuillan Ballycastle				
1913	McQuillan Ballycastle		Seagan an Doimis		
1912	Mitchel's		McQuillan Ballycastle		
1911	Mitchel's		Cuchullians, Dunloy		
1910	Seagan an Doimis		McQuillan Ballycastle		
1909	Brian Óg		McQuillan Ballycastle		
1908	Seagan an Doimis				
1907	O'Neill Crowleys				
1906	Carey Faughs	O'Neill Crowleys			
1905	Tír na nÓg				
1904	Tír na nÓg				
1903	O'Neill Crowleys				
1902	Lámh Dhearg				
1901	Brian Óg				

== Records and statistics ==
=== Teams ===
==== By decade ====
The most successful team of each decade, judged by number of Antrim SHC titles, is as follows:

- 1970s: 3 each for O'Donovan Rossa (1972-76-77) and McQuillans Ballycastle (1975-78-79)
- 1980s: 4 for McQuillans Ballycastle (1980-83-84-86)
- 1990s: 5 each for Dunloy (1990-94-95-97-98) and Ruairí Óg (1991-92-93-96-99)
- 2000s: 6 for Dunloy (2000-01-02-03-07-09)
- 2010s: 5 for Loughgiel Shamrocks (2010-11-12-13-16)
- 2020s: 4 for Dunloy (2020-21-22-26)

== See also ==
- Antrim Intermediate Hurling Championship (Tier 2)
- Antrim Junior A Hurling Championship (Tier 3)
- Antrim Junior B Hurling Championship (Tier 4)
- Antrim Reserve Hurling Cup (Tier 5)
- Antrim Reserve Hurling Shield (Tier 6)
