= Carey Faughs GAC =

Northern Irish Gaelic Athletic Association club

Carey Faughs
- CLG 'Fág an Bealach', Cathaoir an Rí
- Founded: 1903
- County: Antrim
- Colours: Green and white
- Grounds: St. Patrick's Park
- Coordinates: 55°11′54″N 6°11′38″W

Playing kits
| Home Kit | GK Kit |

Senior Club Championships
| | All Ireland | Ulster champions | Antrim champions |
|---|---|---|---|
| Hurling: | 0 | 0 | 3 |

Carey Faughs GAC (/ˈkeɪriːˌfɔːxs/ KARE-ee FAWKHS) is a Gaelic Athletic Association club located in Ballyvoy, County Antrim, Northern Ireland. The club is primarily concerned with the game of hurling.

== History ==
Located in the village of Ballyvoy in the Glens of Antrim, Carey Faughs GAC was founded in 1903 by Dennis Maguire and Patrick Moore. The club was only three years in existence when they won the first of their three Antrim SHC titles in 1906. Carey Faughs have also claimed Antrim IHC and Antrim JHC titles and were the inaugural Ulster intermediate club hurling final-winners in 2004. The club name derives from the war cry Faugh A Ballagh ("clear the way!") and the barony of Car[e]y, named for the ancient Gaelic tribe of the Cothrugu, although the club's official name uses the folk etymology Cathaoir an Rí ("the king's seat").

== Honours ==
- Antrim Senior Hurling Championship (3): 1906, 1916, 1923
- Ulster Intermediate Club Hurling Championship (2): 2004, 2024
- Antrim Intermediate Hurling Championship (4): 1990, 2002, 2021, 2024
- Antrim Junior Hurling Championship (2): 1983, 1999

== Notable players ==
- James Black: Ulster SHC-winner (2011)
