= Antrim Intermediate Hurling Championship =

Annual hurling competition

- Code: Hurling
- Founded: 1937
- Region: Antrim (GAA)
- No. of teams: 11
- Title holders: Robert Emmets Cushendun (4th title)
- Most titles: Carey Faughs (4 titles)
- Sponsors: McKeever Hotel Group

The Antrim Intermediate Hurling Championship is an annual hurling competition, organised by Antrim GAA.

The championship forms the second-tier of Hurling in Antrim. It is contested by the eleven clubs ranked 9–19 in the Antrim championship system. Each year, the champions are promoted to the Senior Championship and lowest finishing team is relegated to the Junior A Championship.

Robert Emmets GAC Cushendun are the title holders, defeating Carey Faughs in the 2026 final.

== Format ==
=== Group stage ===
The 10 teams are divided into two groups of five. Over the course of the group stage, each team plays once against the others in the group, resulting in each team being guaranteed at least four group games. Two points are awarded for a win, one for a draw and zero for a loss. The teams are ranked in the group stage table by points gained, then scoring difference and then their head-to-head record. The top three teams in each group qualify for the knock-out stage.

=== Knockout stage ===
Following the completion of the group stage, the top two teams from each group receive byes to separate semi-finals.

Quarter-finals: Teams that finished 2nd and 3rd in the group stage contest this round. The two 2nd placed teams play the 3rd placed teams from the opposite group. The two winners from these two games advance to the semi-finals.

Semi-finals: The two quarter-final winners and the two group winners contest this round. The two winners from these two games advance to the final.

Final: The two semi-final winners contest the final. The winning team are declared champions.

=== Promotion ===
The winners of the Antrim Intermediate Hurling Championship are promoted to the Antrim Senior Hurling Championship.

=== Relegation ===
At the end of the championship, two 5th-placed teams from the group stage take play-off, with the losing team being relegated to the Antrim Junior A Hurling Championship.

=== Qualification ===
The winners of the Antrim Intermediate Hurling Championship progress to the Ulster Intermediate Club Hurling Championship.

=== History ===
Sambo won the title in 2019. He was in charge of Naomh Éanna at the time.

== Teams ==
=== 2026 teams ===
The 11 teams competing in the 2026 Antrim Intermediate Hurling Championship are:

Club	Location	Colours	Position in 2025	Championship titles	Last championship title
Carey Faughs	Ballyvoy	Green and white	Relegated from senior	4	2024
Clooney Gaels	Ahoghill	Red and black	Semi-finals	2	2022
Con Magee's	Glenravel	Green and white	Junior champion	1	2001
Creggan Kickhams	Creggan	Green and gold	Semi-finals	2	2023
St Mary's Rasharkin	Rasharkin	Blue and saffron	Group stage	0	—
Robert Emmets	Cushendun	Black and green	Group stage	3	2007
Shane O'Neill's	Glenarm	Blue and navy	Group stage	0	—
St Brigid's Cloughmills	Cloughmills	Orange and black	Group stage	2	2016
St Gall's	Milltown	Blue, white and yellow	Group stage	3	2018
St. Paul's	Belfast	Red and white	Group stage	0	—
Tír na nÓg	Randalstown	Blue and white	Runners-up	1	2020

== Qualification for subsequent competitions ==
The Antrim Intermediate Championship winners qualify for the subsequent Ulster Intermediate Club Hurling Championship.

== Sponsorship ==
Andersonstown Social Club have been the title sponsor of the Antrim Intermediate Hurling Championship.

Since 2026 McKeever Hotel Group is the official sponsor of the Antrim Intermediate Hurling Championship.

== Roll of honour ==
=== By club ===
#	Club	Titles	Runners-up	Championships won	Championships runner-up
1	Carey Faughs	4	8	1990, 2002, 2021, 2024	1984 2000 2006 2010 2013 2015 2017, 2019
1	Gort na Móna	4	0	1989, 1996, 2006, 2008	—
1	Robert Emmets	4	1	1973, 1992, 2007, 2026	2022
4	St Gall's	3	0	1997, 2009, 2018	—
5	Kickham's Creggan	2	2	2015, 2023	2018, 2021
5	St Brigids Cloughmills	2	1	2012, 2016	2011
5	Clooney Gaels	2	1	2013, 2022	2020
5	Éire Óg Derriaghy	2	0	1937, 1952	—
5	Patrick Sarsfields	2	1	1972, 2017	2023
10	Naomh Éanna	1	1	2019	2016
10	Tír na nÓg	1	1	2020	2025
10	Glenariffe Oisín	1	1	2025	2024
10	Con Magees Glenravel	1	0	2001	—
10	St John's	1	0	2010	—
10	Lámh Dhearg	1	0	2011	—
10	O'Donovan Rossa	1	0	2014	—
17	St Paul's	0	1	—	2012
17	Cuchulainns	0	1	—	2013

== List of finals ==
=== List of Antrim IHC finals ===
Year	Winners		Runners-up		#
Year	Club	Score	Club	Score	#
2026	Robert Emmets Cushendun	3-25	Carey Faughs	3-21	
2025	Glenariffe Oisín	2-18	Tír na nÓg	0-10	
2024	Carey Faughs	1–19	Glenariffe Oisín	0–15	
2023	Kickhams Creggan	1–16	Patrick Sarsfields	0–14	
2022	Clooney Gaels	1–19	Robert Emmets	1–15	
2021	Carey Faughs	3–17	Kickham's Creggan	1–15	
2020	Tír na nÓg	1–19	Clooney Gaels	0–17	
2019	Naomh Éanna	3–14	Carey Faughs	1–17	
2018	St Gall's	1–16	Kickham's Creggan	0–17	
2017	Patrick Sarsfields	0–16	Carey Faughs	0–07	
2016	St Brigids Cloughmills	2–17	Naomh Éanna	1–16	
2015	Kickhams Creggan		Carey Faughs		
2014	O'Donovan Rossa		Glen Rovers Armoy		
2013	Clooney Gaels	1–16	Carey Faughs	1–14	
2012	St Brigid's Cloughmills	1–12	St Paul's	1–11	
2011	Lámh Dhearg	2–09	St Brigid's Cloughmills	1–09	
2010	St John's		Carey Faughs		
2009	St Gall's				
2008	Gort na Móna				
2007	Robert Emmets				
2006	Gort na Móna				
2003–06					
2002	Carey Faughs				
2001	Con Magees Glenravel				
1998–2000					
1997	St Gall's				
1996	Gort na Móna		Carey Faughs		
1993–1996					
1992	Robert Emmets				
1991					
1990	Carey Faughs				
1989	Gort na Móna				
1974–1989					
1973	Robert Emmets				
1972	Patrick Sarsfields				
1953–1971					
1952	Éire Óg Derriaghy				
1938–1951					
1937	Éire Óg Derriaghy				

== Records and statistics ==
=== Teams ===
==== By decade ====
The most successful team of each decade, judged by number of Antrim IHC titles, is as follows:

- 2010s: 2 for St Brigid's Cloughmills (2012-16)
- 2020s: 2 for Carey Faughs (2021-24)

== See also ==
- Antrim Senior Hurling Championship (Tier 1)
- Antrim Junior A Hurling Championship (Tier 3)
- Antrim Junior B Hurling Championship (Tier 4)
- Antrim Reserve Hurling Cup (Tier 5)
- Antrim Reserve Hurling Shield (Tier 6)
