= St Enda's GAC =

Antrim-based Gaelic games club

St Enda's GAA
- Naomh Éanna
- Founded: 1956
- County: Antrim
- Nickname: Enda's
- Colours: Amber and Black
- Grounds: Páirc Éanna
- Coordinates: 54°39′44.57″N 5°58′08.21″W

Playing kits
Standard colours

St Enda's GAC is a Gaelic Athletic Association club from Glengormley, County Antrim, Northern Ireland. They cater for gaelic football, hurling and camogie.

== History ==
Founded in 1956 by local gaels, Edward Sherry, Tony Colaluca, Christy Mannion, Austin Hinds, Paddy Laverty, Sean Hayes and Brendan and Seamus Boylan amongst others, St Enda's have grown from a small rural club to the biggest GAA club in the province of Ulster which is the social and cultural epicentre of the local community, often in the face of violent adversity.

In the late 1950s, Henry Campbell who owned land on the Hightown Road offered one of his fields as a pitch to play on. Subsequently, the club moved to another of Campbell's fields, which was bought for £5000 in 1972. In the same year the club won its first major trophy when they won the Junior Championship.

Further achievements followed winning Division 4 Hurling; The Antrim Junior Hurling Championship, 1990, 1992,2012; Division 3 All County Football, 1975; Division 3 Football again in 1984, Division 2 Football in 1987, 1989, 2002 playoff final and the All County 7-a-side tournament in 2001.

The club continued to develop despite the many attacks on the club during the troubles, the club premises being destroyed in 1972 and badly damaged in 1983. Mr. Devlin, whose family was involved in the club, was shot and killed at the entrance to the club. A housing development opportunity in the mid-1980s allowed the club after negotiations with a developer to purchase with the help of grant aid the site of the new pitch and clubrooms. The President of the G.A.A., Seosamh Mac Donncha officially opened the new pitch and clubrooms on 4 May 1998.

== Honours ==
- Ulster Intermediate Club Hurling Championship: (1)
  - 2019
- Ulster Intermediate Club Football Championship: (1)
  - 2018
- Antrim Intermediate Hurling Championship: (1)
  - 2019
- Antrim Intermediate Football Championship: (1)
  - 2018
- Antrim Junior Hurling Championship: (3)
  - 1990, 1992, 2012
- Antrim Junior Football Championship: (1)
  - 1972
- Antrim Under-16 Hurling Championship: (1)
  - 2024
