= Páirc Mac Uílín =

Sportsground in Ballycastle, County Antrim, Northern Ireland

- McQuillan Park
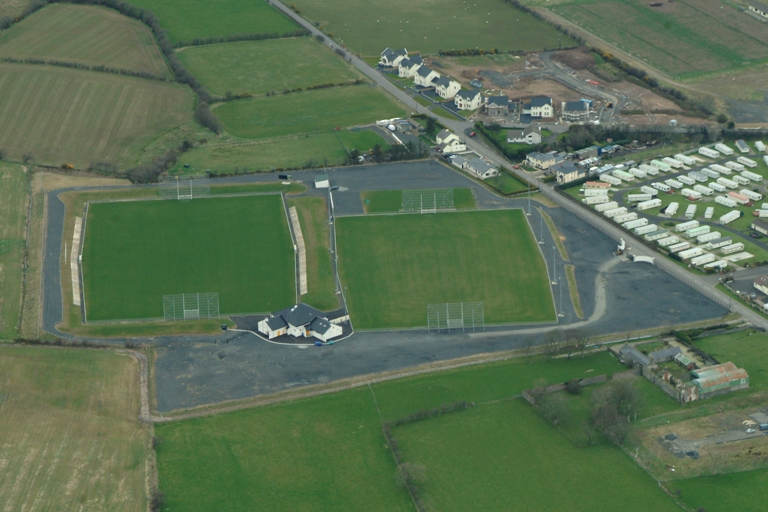

- Location within Northern Ireland
- Location: 14-18 Whitepark Road, Ballycastle, County Antrim, Northern Ireland
- Coordinates: 55.204123°N 6.273142°W
- Owner: McQuillan GAC Ballycastle
- Capacity: 4,900
- Surface: Grass
- Field size: 138m x 90m
- Public transit: Ballycastle bus stop (Marine Corner)

Construction
- Groundbreaking: 2003
- Opened: 2007

Website
- mcquillangac.com

Páirc Mac Uílín (Irish pronunciation: [ˈpˠaːɾʲc mˠək ˈiːlʲiːnʲ]) is a Gaelic Athletic Association playing field in Ballycastle, County Antrim, Northern Ireland. It is the home of the McQuillan GAC Ballycastle club. The grounds have two full size pitches, floodlight facilities, a training area, a Hurling wall as well as multi-purpose clubrooms. The club also has a wind turbine installed on site.

It officially opened in 2007, the centenary year of McQuillan GAC Ballycastle, with GAA President Nickey Brennan, newly installed Ulster President Tom Daly and Antrim chairman Dr John McSparron in attendance. The first match was a friendly between the home side and Kilkenny club James Stephens. In December 2012 Páirc MacUílín received the Antrim and Ulster GAA Ground of the Year awards.

During the redevelopment of Casement Park, Páirc MacUílín hosted the senior Antrim county hurling team from 2014 to 2016. It was also selected as the location for the Antrim Senior Hurling Championship finals in 2013, 2014 and 2016.

Matches from three different senior inter county competitions have been held at the venue, including the National Hurling League, Leinster Senior Hurling Championship and the All-Ireland Senior Hurling Championship.

== Antrim Senior Hurling Championship Finals at Páirc MacUílín ==
24 September 2017 Antrim Senior Hurling Championship Final	Ruairí Óg, Cushendall	2-15 - 2-9	Dunloy	Páirc Mac Uílín, Ballycastle
3:15 pm		Report		Referee: Mark O’Neill (Armoy)

25 September 2016 Antrim Senior Hurling Championship Final	Loughgiel Shamrocks	1-15 - 1-12	Ruairí Óg, Cushendall	Páirc Mac Uílín, Ballycastle

28 September 2014 Antrim Senior Hurling Championship Final	St Gall's	1-5 - 1-15	Ruairí Óg, Cushendall	Páirc Mac Uílín, Ballycastle

30 September 2013 Antrim Senior Hurling Championship Final	Loughgiel Shamrocks	3-14 - 2-6	Ruairí Óg, Cushendall	Páirc Mac Uílín, Ballycastle

== Inter county matches at Páirc MacUílín ==
13 March 2016 Allianz National Hurling League Division 2A	Antrim	1-11 - 1-17	Carlow	Páirc Mac Uílín
14:00	C Johnston 0-3, 1f, J Connolly 1-0, C Clarke (2f), L Watson (1f, 1 '65') 0-2 each, K McKernan, E McCloskey, M Dudley, N McKenna 0-1 each.	Report	D Murphy 0-7f, M Kavanagh 1-1, J Doyle, Sean Murphy, S Whelan, 0-2 each, D English, J Kavanagh, JM Nolan 0-1 each.	Referee: S Cleere (Kilkenny)

21 February 2016 Allianz National Hurling League Division 2A	Antrim	3-25 - 3-13	Kildare	Páirc Mac Uílín
14:00	C Clarke 1-9 (0-5fs, 0-1 '65'), S McCaughan 2-1, K McKernan 0-5 (1f), N McKenna, Conor Johnston 0-3 each, J McGreevy 0-2, E McCloskey, S McCrory 0-1 each.	Report	M Fitzgerald 0-7 (6fs), G Keegan 1-3, J Sheridan 2-0, N O Muineachain, R Casey, P Cocoman 0-1 each.	Referee: D Hughes (Carlow)

15 July 2015 Ulster U21 Hurling Championship Semi-final	Antrim	6-22 - 0-7	Armagh	Páirc Mac Uílín
19:45	Conor Johnston (2-2), S McCaughan (1-4, 0-1 free), J O’Connell (1-2), Ciaran Johnston (1-1), J Connolly (0-4, 0-2 frees), P McBride (1-0), C Ross (0-3), N McKenna (0-3), M Connolly (0-1), D Traynor (0-1), T Ó Ciaran (0-1).	Report	R Fullerton (0-2, 0-1 free), S Renaghan (0-2), L Oliver (0-2), T Nevin (0-1).	Referee: A Nash

3 May 2015 Leinster Senior Hurling Championship Qualifying Group	Antrim	5-17 – 3-22	Laois	Páirc Mac Uílín
15:30	C Clarke (2-7, 1-0 pen, 0-5f, 0-1 ’65), C Johnson (2-1), N McManus (1-2), P Shiels (0-3, 1f), N McAuley (0-1), M Bradley (0-1), E Campbell (0-1), D Murphy (0-1).	Report	Z Keenan (1-9, 1-0 pen, 0-7f), T Fitzgerald (1-1), B Conroy (1-0), PJ Scully (0-3), R King (0-3), W Hyland (0-3), P Purcell (0-1), J Campion (0-1), C Dwyer (0-1).	Referee: P O'Dwyer (Carlow)

22 March 2015 Allianz National Hurling League Division 1B	Antrim	0-19 - 2-17	Offaly	Páirc Mac Uílín
14:00		Report

22 February 2015 Allianz National Hurling League Division 1B	Antrim	1-12 - 0-23	Limerick	Páirc Mac Uílín
14:00	Paul Shiels (0-7, 0-5 frees); Eoghan Campbell (1-1); Matthew Donnelly, Simon McCrory, Conor Johnston, Conor Clarke (0-1)	Report	Shane Dowling (0-6 frees); David Reidy, Paul Browne, Cian Lynch, Tom Condon (0-3); Donal O’Grady (0-2); James Ryan, Seamus Hickey, Wayne McNamara (0-1)	Referee: John Keenan

16 July 2014 Ulster U21 Hurling Championship Semi-final	Antrim	3-23 - 0-10	Derry	Páirc Mac Uílín
19:30	C Clarke (1-7, 0-2f, 1'65), S McCaughan (2-1), N McKenna (0-3), D McCloskey (0-3), R McCambridge (0-2), J O'Connell (0-2), M Bradley (0-2), C McNaughton (0-2), D McGuinness (0-1).	Report	S Farren (0-5f), J O'Dwyer (0-3), T McCloskey (0-1), T O'Kane (0-1).

29 June 2014 All-Ireland Senior Hurling Championship Qualifier Round 1	Antrim	1-20 - 2-19	Offaly	Páirc Mac Uílín
14:00	P Shiels (0-08, 4f, 1 65), PJ O’Connell (1-02), C Clarke (0-03), N McAuley (0-01), N McManus (0-01, 1f), T McCann (0-01), J McGreevy (0-01), C McCann (0-01), M Bradley (0-01), S McAfee (0-01).	report	B Carroll (1-04, 1-2f, 2 65), J Bergin (0-05, 2f), D Kenny (1-00), S Dooley (0-03), C Egan (0-02), D Currams (0-01), D Morkan (0-01), S Cleary (0-01), C Parlon (0-01); C Mahon (0-01).	Referee: James McGrath (Westmeath)

11 May 2014 Leinster Senior Hurling Championship Qualifying Group	Antrim	1-17 - 2-07	London	Páirc Mac Uílín
	P Shiels (1-10 0-04f 0-02'65), C Clarke (0-03 0-01f), N McManus, E Campbell, C Johnson, S McAfee (0-01 each)	Report	E Kelly (0-05 0-03f 0-02 '65), K Walsh, M Duggan (1-00 each) D Moore, P Phelan (0-01 each)

27 April 2014 Leinster Senior Hurling Championship Qualifying Group	Antrim	0-23 - 2-11	Westmeath	Páirc Mac Uílín
15:00	P Shiels (0-12, 10fs), C Clarke, PJ O'Connell (0-3 each), E Campbell (0-2), N McManus, N McKenna, D Hamill (0-1 each).	Report	D McNicholas (2-1), N O'Brien (0-5, 4fs), E Price (0-3, 2fs), C Curley (0-2).	Referee: Fergal Horgan (Tipperary)

30 March 2014 Allianz National Hurling League Division 1B Relegation play-off	Antrim	1–18 – 1–14	Offaly	Páirc Mac Uílín
14:00	P Shiels (0-09, 0-04f, 0-01 '65'), C Carson (1-01), PJ O'Connell (0-03), N McManus (0-03, 0-01f), E Campbell (0-02).	Report	S Quirke (1-02), J Bergin (0-05, 0-04f), B Carroll (0-03), D Currams (0-02), C Mahon (0-01), S Dooley (0-01).	Referee: James Owens (Wexford)

16 March 2014 Allianz National Hurling League Division 1B	Antrim	1–12 – 0–18	Cork	Páirc Mac Uílín
14:00	S McAfee (0–4, 2f), M Donnelly (1–1), N McManus (2fs), P Shiels (1f), C Carson (0–2 each), Barry McFall (0–1).	Report	P Horgan (0–11, 8fs, 1 65), C Lehane (0–4), P Cronin, B Hartnett, P Haughney (0–1 each).	Referee: E Hassan (Derry)

16 February 2014 Allianz National Hurling League Division 1B	Antrim	1–11 – 0–15	Wexford	Páirc Mac Uílín
14:00	P Shiels 0–7 (5fs), D McKernan 1–0, C Carson 0–2, N McKenna, Conor Johnston 0–1 each	Report	J Guiney 0–5 (4fs, 1 '65'), P Morris 0–3, D O'Keeffe, L Og McGovern 0–2 each, A Shore, I Byrne, R Jacob 0–1 each	Referee: James McGrath (Westmeath)

25 March 2007 Allianz National Hurling League Division 1B	Antrim	0-11 - 2-21	Kilkenny	Páirc Mac Uílín
13:00		Report

== Antrim's record at Páirc MacUílín ==
Played	Won	Lost
14	7	7

== Awards ==
- Antrim GAA Ground of the Year 2012, 2015
- Ulster GAA Ground of the Year 2012
