= St John's GAA (Antrim) =

Antrim-based Gaelic games club

St John's
- Naomh Eoin
- Founded: 1929
- County: Antrim
- Colours: Blue and white
- Grounds: Corrigan Park, Whiterock Road, Belfast
- Coordinates: 54.59237°N 5.97736°W

Playing kits
Home Kit	Change Kit

Senior Club Championships
	All Ireland	Ulster champions	Antrim champions
Football:	0	1	24
Hurling:	0	1	7

Location of St John's GAA in Belfast

St John's GAA (Irish: Naomh Eoin CLG) is a Gaelic football, hurling and ladies' Gaelic football club in Belfast, County Antrim, Northern Ireland. The club, which was established in 1929, is based at Corrigan Park in West Belfast.

== History ==
The club was founded in 1929, shortly after the opening of St. John The Evangelist Church (in the Catholic parish of St. John's) in Belfast.

St John's GAA have won the Antrim Senior Football Championship on several occasions and won the Ulster Senior Club Football title in 1977. The club reached the final of the 1977–78 All-Ireland Senior Club Football Championship. The club also fields hurling teams and were awarded the Ulster Senior Club Hurling Championship title in 1973.

== Notable people ==
- Michael Bradley, hurler
- John Gough, refereed the 1983 All-Ireland SFC final
- Andy McCallin, 1971 Antrim All Star
- Peter McGinnity, Fermanagh footballer who played with St John's in the 1970s

== Honours ==
- Ulster Senior Club Football Championship (1): 1977
- Antrim Senior Football Championship (24): 1945, 1949, 1951, 1957, 1959, 1960, 1961, 1962, 1963, 1964, 1965, 1969, 1970, 1972, 1975, 1976, 1977, 1978, 1980, 1981, 1984, 1986, 1988, 1998
- Ulster Senior Club Hurling Championship (1): 1973
- Antrim Senior Hurling Championship (8): 1934, 1951, 1961, 1962, 1965, 1969, 1973, 2025
