= O'Donovan Rossa GAC (Antrim) =

Antrim-based Gaelic games club

- CLG Ó Donnabháin Rosa
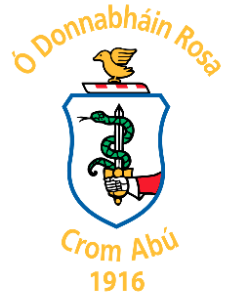
- Founded: 1916
- County: Antrim
- Nickname: Rossa
- Colours: Royal Blue, Saffron and White
- Grounds: Rossa Park, 76 Shaws Road

Playing kits
Home Kit	GK Kit

Senior Club Championships
	All Ireland	Ulster champions	Antrim champions
Football:	0	0	16
Hurling:	0	4	15
Camogie:	1	5	10

Location of O'Donovan Rossa GAC in Belfast

O'Donovan Rossa GAC (Irish: CLG Ó Donnabháin Rosa) is a Gaelic Athletic Association club based in Belfast, County Antrim. The club is a member of the Antrim GAA and currently fields teams in Hurling, Gaelic football, Camogie and Handball. The club is named after Irish patriot and revolutionary Jeremiah O'Donovan Rossa and one of the club founders was Joe McKelvey.

== History ==
O'Donovan Rossa GAC was founded in 1916 at Bunkers Hill, now the site of Kennedy's old bakery in Beechmount Avenue on the Falls Road. At foundation, the membership was confined to Irish Volunteers and amongst the first members were Sean Osbourne, Joe McKelvey, Sean Hackett from Tipperary, with Sean O’Sullivan as the first chairman.

Soon the young club was making its presence felt, winning the Hurling Championship in 1918, 1919 and 1921, while the footballers collected the Football Championship in 1920 and 1921, completing the double in 1921. For a number of subsequent years County Championships eluded the club, but in 1938 they had a narrow victory over Dunloy at Corrigan Park by 2 points to 1 point.

At the start of the 1940s Rossa welcomed most of the St Mary's C.B.S. team as members of the club. These players made their contribution to renewed success, winning many Senior Football and Hurling Championships in the 1940s and 1950s.

In 1988, the club won an All Ireland Semi Final against Patrickswell. In an epic game played in Limerick, Rossa emerged as one point winners against a Patrickswell side that included greats like Gary Kirby and Ciarán Carey. The team eventually lost in the All Ireland Final at Croke Park to a Buffers Alley side led by Tony Doran.

== Honours ==
O'Donovan Rossa won the Antrim Senior Hurling Championship in 1918, 1919, 1921, 1946, 1949, 1955, 1957, 1958, 1959, 1960, 1972, 1976, 1977, 1988 and 2004. The club also won the Antrim Senior Football Championship in 1920, 1921, 1927, 1930, 1944, 1946, 1947, 1950, 1952, 1953, 1955, 1956, 1958, 1973, 1989 and 1991.

The club's titles include:

- All-Ireland Intermediate Club Hurling Championship (1)
  - 2015
- Ulster Intermediate Club Hurling Championship (1)
  - 2014
- Ulster Senior Club Hurling Championship (4)
  - 1972, 1977, 1988, 2004
- Antrim Senior Hurling Championship (15)
  - 1918, 1919, 1921, 1946, 1949, 1955, 1957, 1958, 1959, 1960, 1972, 1976, 1977, 1988, 2004
- Antrim Senior Football Championship (16)
  - 1920, 1921, 1927, 1930, 1944, 1946, 1947, 1950, 1952, 1953, 1955, 1956, 1958, 1973, 1989, 1991
- Antrim Intermediate Hurling Championship (1)
  - 2014
- All-Ireland Senior Club Camogie Championship (1)
  - 2008
- Ulster Senior Club Camogie Championship (5)
  - 2004, 2005, 2006, 2007, 2012
- Antrim Senior Camogie Championship (10)
  - 2000, 2002, 2004, 2005, 2006, 2007, 2008, 2010, 2012, 2013

== Notable players ==
- Ciaran Barr - former hurling player
- Jane Adams - camogie player
