= Dunloy GAC =

Antrim-based Gaelic games club

Dunloy Cú Chulainn's
- Founded: 1908
- County: Antrim
- Nickname: Cú Chulainns
- Colours: Green and Yellow
- Grounds: Pearse Park
- Coordinates: 55°00′26.58″N 6°24′42.42″W

Playing kits
Home Kit	Change Kit

Senior Club Championships
	All Ireland	Ulster champions	Antrim champions
Football:	-	-	7
Hurling:	-	11	17
Camogie:	-	3	12

Dunloy Cú Chulainn's is a Gaelic Athletic Association club located in Dunloy, County Antrim, Northern Ireland. The club competes in Antrim GAA competitions.

In 1908, Andy Dooey, Bob Black, Dan Boyle and Paddy McCamphill founded the club.

The club plays its games at Pearse Park, located on the Bridge Road in Dunloy. It holds two full size playing fields, an out door 4G pitch, changing rooms, a club room & an indoor academy alongside a gym.

The club caters for Hurling, Gaelic Football and Camogie and fields teams at all age grades.

== Honours ==
=== Hurling ===
- All-Ireland Senior Club Hurling Championship finalists (5): 1995, 1996, 2003, 2004, 2023
- Ulster Senior Club Hurling Championships (11): 1990, 1994, 1995, 1997, 2000, 2001, 2002, 2003, 2007, 2009, 2022
- Antrim Senior Hurling Championships (17): 1990, 1994, 1995, 1997, 1998, 2000, 2001, 2002, 2003, 2007, 2009, 2017, 2019, 2020, 2021, 2022, 2026

=== Football ===
- Antrim Senior Football Championships (7): 1924, 1925, 1926, 1931, 1935, 1936, 2025

=== Camogie ===
- Ulster Senior Club Camogie Championship (3): 1994, 2003, 2026
- Antrim Senior Camogie Championship (12): 1946, 1949, 1955, 1957, 1958, 1961, 1994, 1996, 1998, 1999, 2003, 2026
