= Tipperary Senior Camogie Championship =

- Current season or competition: 2026 Tipperary Senior Camogie Championship
- Code: Camogie
- Founded: 1932; 94 years ago
- Region: Tipperary (GAA)
- Trophy: Bernie O'Dowd Trophy
- No. of teams: 10
- Title holders: Thurles Sarsfields (2nd title)
- Sponsors: FBD Insurance
- Official website: Official website

The Tipperary Senior Camogie Championship (known for sponsorship reasons as the FBD Insurance Tipperary Senior Camogie Championship) is an annual Camogie competition contested by the top ranking Camogie teams in Tipperary.

Games are played during the summer and autumn months with the county final currently being played at Semple Stadium in October. The prize for the winning team is the Bernie O'Dowd Trophy. The championship currently features a group stage followed by a knock-out stage.

The Tipperary County Championship is part of the Munster Senior Club Camogie Championship. The winners of the Tipperary county final join the senior champions of the other counties to contest the provincial championship.

10 teams currently participate in the Tipperary County Championship.

The 2026 Tipperary Senior Camogie Championship was won by Thurles Sarsfields.

== History ==
The first Tipperary Senior Camogie Championship was contested in 1932 and was won by Coolmoyne. After the establishment of the All-Ireland Senior Club Camogie Championship (SCC) in 1964, St Patrick's, which was founded in 1964 when Ballingarry and Glengoogle amalgamated, went on to win the 1965 and 1966 All-Ireland SCC. Following the victory in 1966 the club disbanded and the players returned to their original clubs.

During these early years up to the 1970s the championship struggled with low team numbers and many amalgamations. The late 1980s and 1990s saw back to back 6-in-a-rows by Cashel and Toomevara.

The 2000s were dominated by Cashel again who won 9 out of 12 of the following Tipperary SCC including 6 Munster SCC and 2 All-Ireland SCC in 2007 and 2009 the first for Tipperary since St Patrick's wins in the 1960s. In the same time frame Tipperary's camogie team was at their strongest reaching 8 consecutive All Ireland Camogie Championship finals and winning 5 of them.

The 2010s saw the first ever 7-in-a-row by Burgess Duharra.

== Format ==
As of 2026 the ten teams are divided into two groups of five.The teams face each other team in their group. 2 points are awarded for a win and 1 for a draw.

The top team of both groups qualifies directly for the semi-finals. The second and third placed teams face each other in the quarter-finals. The winner advances to the semi-finals.

The two teams winning the semi-finals contest the county final to determine the champion.

The bottom 2 teams of both groups face off in a knock-out with the team losing two matches being relegated to the Tipperary Intermediate Camogie Championship.

== Teams ==
=== 2026 teams ===
The 10 teams competing in the 2026 Tipperary Senior Camogie Championship were:

Club	Location	Position in 2026	Championship titles	Last championship title
Annacarty	Anacarty	Semi-Finals	–	–
Burgess-Duharra	Burgess	Relegated	8	2018
Cashel	Cashel	Quarter-Finals	15	2009
Clonoulty–Rossmore	Clonoulty	Runners-Up	1	2024
Drom & Inch	Bouladuff	Semi-Finals	12	2023
Knochavilla Donaskeigh Kickhams	Dundrum	Relegation Semi-Finals	–	–
Moneygall	Moneygall	Relegation Final	–	–
Moycarkey–Borris	Littleton	Quarter-Finals	–	–
Silvermines	Silvermines	Relegation Semi-Finals	–	–
Thurles Sarsfields	Thurles	Champion	2	2026

== Qualification for subsequent competitions ==
The Tipperary Senior Camogie Championship winners qualify for the subsequent Munster Senior Club Camogie Championship.

== Roll of honour ==
Club	Titles	Years won
Cashel	15	1986, 1987, 1988, 1989, 1990, 1991, 1998, 1999, 2000, 2001, 2002, 2005, 2006, 2007, 2009
Drom & Inch	12	1974, 1975, 1976, 1982, 2003, 2008, 2011, 2019, 2020, 2021, 2022, 2023
Burgess Duharra	8	2010, 2012, 2013, 2014, 2015, 2016, 2017, 2018
Toomevara	7	1992, 1993, 1994, 1995, 1996, 1997, 2004
Thurles	4	1970, 1971, 1972, 1973
Portroe	4	1981, 1983, 1984, 1985
St Patrick's	3	1964, 1965, 1966
St. Mary's (Newport)	3	1978, 1979, 1982
Coolmoyne	2	1932, 1933
Thurles Sarsfields	2	2025, 2026
St Cualan	1	1980
Clonoulty–Rossmore	1	2024

== List of finals ==
=== Legend ===
- Gold – All-Ireland Senior Club champions
- Silver – Munster senior club champions

Year	Winners		Runners-up		Source
Year	Club	Score	Club	Score	Source
1932	Coolmoyne	3-01	Boherlahan	1-00	
1933	Coolmoyne		Ballingarry		
1934					
1935					
1936					
1937					
1938					
1939					
1940					
1941					
1942					
1943					
1944					
1945					
1946					
1947					
1948					
1949					
1950					
1951					
1952					
1953					
1954					
1955					
1956					
1957					
1958					
1959					
1960					
1961					
1962					
1963					
1964	St Patrick's				
1965	St Patrick's		Elmville		
1966	St Patrick's				
1967					
1968					
1969					
1970	Thurles		Lorrha		
1971	Thurles				
1972	Thurles				
1973	Thurles				
1974	Drom & Inch or 1977				
1975	Drom & Inch				
1976	Drom & Inch				
1977					
1978	St. Mary's (Newport)				
1979	St. Mary's (Newport)				
1980	St Cualans				
1981	Portroe				
1982	St. Mary's (Newport) or Drom & Inch		St Bernadettes		
1983	Portroe				
1984	Portroe				
1985	Portroe				
1986	Cashel		St. Mary's (Newport)		
1987	Cashel	3-05	Roscrea	0-02	
1988	Cashel				
1989	Cashel		Toomevara		
1990	Cashel		Toomevara		
1991	Cashel	3-16	Toomevara	2-06	
1992	Toomevara		Cashel		
1993	Toomevara		Cashel		
1994	Toomevara				
1995	Toomevara		Cashel		
1996	Toomevara	2-10	Drom & Inch	1-08	
1997	Toomevara	4-10	Cashel	0-10	
1998	Cashel		Drom & Inch		
1999	Cashel	3-07	Toomevara	1-05	
2000	Cashel	1-10	Toomevara	2-06	
2001	Cashel		Toomevara		
2002	Cashel	1-11	Toomevara	0-12	
2003	Drom & Inch	2-11 (r)	Toomevara	2-09 (r)	
2004	Toomevara	2-08	Drom & Inch	2-06	
2005	Cashel	0-16 (r)	Duharra	1-09 (r)	
2006	Cashel	0-15	Toomevara	1-03	
2007	Cashel	0-14	Duharra	0-06	
2008	Drom & Inch		Toomevara		
2009	Cashel	2-15 (a.e.t)	Burgess Duharra	2-13	
2010	Burgess Duharra	1-14	Toomevara	2-09	
2011	Drom & Inch		Cashel		
2012	Burgess Duharra	0-09	Drom & Inch	1-05	
2013	Burgess Duharra	3-08	Drom & Inch	1-12	
2014	Burgess Duharra	3-12	Drom & Inch	1-09	
2015	Burgess Duharra	1-11	Drom & Inch	0-05	
2016	Burgess Duharra	0-13 2-13 (r)	Boris-Ileigh	1-10 1-09 (r)	
2017	Burgess Duharra	2-13	Drom & Inch	0-10	
2018	Burgess Duharra	2-20	Clonoulty–Rossmore	0-08	
2019	Drom & Inch	2-10	Burgess Duharra	0-09	
2020	Drom & Inch	1-13	Clonoulty–Rossmore	0-09	
2021	Drom & Inch	3-09	Clonoulty–Rossmore	1-10	
2022	Drom & Inch	3-10	Clonoulty–Rossmore	0-13	
2023	Drom & Inch	2-09	Clonoulty–Rossmore	0-14	
2024	Clonoulty–Rossmore	0-21	Thurles Sarsfields	1-12	
2025	Thurles Sarsfields	5-11	Clonoulty–Rossmore	4-10	
2026	Thurles Sarsfields	2-11	Clonoulty–Rossmore	0-15	

== See also ==
Munster Senior Club Camogie Championship

All Ireland Senior Club Camogie Championship
