= All-Ireland Senior Club Camogie Championship 2025 =

Inter-county club camogie tournament

All-Ireland Senior Club Hurling Championship 2025
Championship Details
- Dates: 26 October 2025 – 3 January 2026
- Teams: 14

All Ireland Champions
- Winners: Athenry (2nd win)

Provincial Champions
- Munster: St. Finbarr's
- Leinster: Dicksboro
- Ulster: Loughgiel Shamrocks
- Connacht: Not Played

Championship Statistics
- Matches Played: 14

The 2025 All-Ireland Senior Club Camogie Championship was the 62nd staging of the All-Ireland Senior Club Camogie Championship, the Camogie Association's premier inter-county club camogie tournament. The championship ran from 26 October 2025 to 3 January 2026.

Athenry from Galway won the championship for the second time in a replay of the final after a draw in the first match. They defeated St. Finbar's from Cork.

== Galway Senior Club Camogie Championship ==
The Connacht Senior Club Championship is not played due to the dominance of the teams from Galway in this province. Accordingly, the champion of the Galway Senior Club Championship takes this place automatically.

The 2025 Galway Club Championship was won by Athenry.

== Leinster Senior Club Camogie Championship ==
| Semi-Finals | | Final |
| Oulart-the-Ballagh (Wexford) | 2-17 |
| St Vincents (Dublin) | 3-5 | Dicksboro (Kilkenny) | 0-17 |
| Dicksboro (Kilkenny) | 3-17 | Oulart-the-Ballagh (Wexford) | 1-13 |
| Birr (Offaly) | 0-04 |

=== Leinster semi-finals ===
| 3 November 2025 | Oulart-the-Ballagh (Wexford) | 2-17 – 3-5 | St Vincents (Dublin) |
| | | Report |

| 3 November 2025 | Dicksboro (Kilkenny) | 3-17 – 0-04 | Birr (Offaly) |
| | | Report |

=== Leinster final ===
| 17 November 2023 Final | Dicksboro (Kilkenny) | 0-17 – 1-13 | Oulart–The Ballagh (Wexford) |
| | | Report |

== Munster Senior Club Camogie Championship ==
Preliminary Round
Newcastle West (Limerick) | 1-10
Inagh-Kilnamona (Clare) | 0-09
Thurles Sarfields (Tipperary) | 0-11
Clanmaurice (Kerry) | 0-00

Semi-Finals
Newcastle West (Limerick) | 3-14
St. Finbar's (Cork) | 2-19 a.e.t
Thurles Sarfields (Tipperary) | 3-16
De La Salle (Waterford) | 2-21

Final
St. Finbar's (Cork) | 3-11
De La Salle (Waterford) | 2-12

=== Munster Preliminary Round ===
| 26 October 2025 | Newcastle West (Limerick) | 1-10 – 0-09 | Inagh Kilnamona (Clare) |
| | | Report |

| 28 October 2025 | Thurles Sarfields (Tipperary) | 0-11 – 0-00 | Clanmaurice (Kerry) |
| | | Report |

=== Munster semi-finals ===
| 10 November 2025 | St. Finbar's (Cork) | 3-14 – 2-19 a.e.t | Newcastle West (Limerick) |
| | | Report |

| 10 November 2025 | Thurles Sarfields (Tipperary) | 3-16 – 2-21 | De La Salle (Waterford) |
| | | Report |

=== Munster final ===
| 22 November 2025 | St. Finbar's (Cork) | 3-11 – 2-12 | De La Salle (Waterford) |
| | | Report | | Referee: Aaron Hogg (Clare) |

== Ulster Senior Club Camogie Championship ==
| Semi-Finals | | Final |
| Loughgiel Shamrocks (Antrim) | 7-11 |
| Slaughtneil (Derry) | 0-05 | Loughgiel Shamrocks (Antrim) | 2-15 |
| | | Clonduff(Down) | 1-10 |

=== Ulster semi-finals ===
| 2 November 2023 | Loughgiel Shamrocks (Antrim) | 7-11 – 0-05 | Slaughtneil (Derry) |
| | | Report |

=== Ulster final ===
| 17 November 2025 | Loughgiel Shamrocks (Antrim) | 2-15 – 1-10 | Clonduff (Down) |
| | | Report |

== All-Ireland Senior Club Camogie Championship ==
| Semi-Finals | | Final |
| St. Finbar's (Cork) | 3-15 a.e.t |
| Loughgiel Shamrocks (Antrim) | 3-14 | St. Finbar's (Cork) | 0-15 / 0-12 |
| Athenry (Galway) | 1-9 | Athenry (Galway) | 1-12 / 0-14 |
| Dicksboro (Kilkenny) | 0-10 |

=== All-Ireland semi-finals ===
| 30 November 2025 | St. Finbar's (Cork) | 3-15 a.e.t. – 3-14 | Loughgiel Shamrocks (Antrim) |
| | | Report |

| 29 November 2025 | Athenry (Galway) | 1-09 – 0-10 | Dicksboro (Kilkenny) |
| | | Report |

=== All-Ireland final ===
| 15 December 2025 | St. Finbar's (Cork) | 0-15 – 1-12 | Athenry (Galway) |
| | | Report |

=== All-Ireland final replay ===
| 3 January 2026 | St. Finbar's (Cork) | 0-12 – 0-14 | Athenry (Galway) |
| | | Report |
