= All-Ireland Senior Club Camogie Championship 2024 =

Inter-county club camogie tournament

All-Ireland Senior Club Hurling Championship 2024
Championship Details
- Dates: October 2024 – 15 December 2024
- Teams: 13

All Ireland Champions
- Winners: Sarsfields (4th win)

Provincial Champions
- Munster: Truagh-Clonlara
- Leinster: St. Vincents
- Ulster: Loughgiel Shamrocks
- Connacht: Not Played

Championship Statistics
- Matches Played: 12

The 2025 All-Ireland Senior Club Camogie Championship was the 61st staging of the All-Ireland Senior Club Camogie Championship, the Camogie Association's premier inter-county club camogie tournament. The championship ran from October 2024 to 15 December 2024.

Sarsfields from Galway won the championship for the fourth time.

== Galway Senior Club Camogie Championship ==
The Connacht Senior Club Championship is not played due to the dominance of the teams from Galway in this province. Accordingly, the champion of the Galway Senior Club Championship takes this place automatically.

The 2024 Galway Club Championship was won by Sarsfields.

== Leinster Senior Club Camogie Championship ==
=== Leinster Semi Final ===
Semi Final	Piltown (Kilkenny)	2-10 – 2-09	Glynn-Barntown (Wexford)

=== Leinster final ===
Final	St. Vincents (Dublin)	2-12 – 1-13	Piltown (Kilkenny)
				TV: https://www.youtube.com/watch?v=q4Hqa_iAIRs&t=7282s

== Munster Senior Club Camogie Championship ==
=== Munster final ===
Truagh-Clonlara (Clare)	4-12 (9) – 3-15 (8)	Gailltir (Waterford)
	Report

The Munster final was level after full time and still level after 2 periods of extra-time. It was decided on sudden-death frees.

== Ulster Senior Club Camogie Championship ==
=== Ulster final ===
Loughgiel Shamrocks (Antrim)	3-16 – 0-05	Swatragh (Derry)
	Report

== All-Ireland Senior Club Camogie Championship ==
Semi-Finals		Final
Sarsfields (Galway)	1-16
Loughgiel Shamrocks (Antrim)	3-09	Sarsfields (Galway)	1-17
Truagh‑Clonlara (Clare)	0-11	Truagh‑Clonlara (Clare)	0-06
St Vincents (Dublin)	0-9

=== All-Ireland semi-finals ===
Sarsfields (Galway)	1-16 – 3-09	Loughgiel Shamrocks (Antrim)
	Report

Truagh-Clonlara (Clare)	0-11 – 0-09	St Vincents (Dublin
	Report

=== All-Ireland final ===
Sarsfields (Galway)	1-17 – 0-06	Truagh-Clonlara (Clare)
	Report
