= All-Ireland Senior Club Camogie Championship 1964 =

Camogie championship

Winners
- Champions: Celtic (1st title)
- Captain: Bríd Hanbury

Runners-up
- Runners-up: Deirdre
- Captain: Sue Ward

The 1964 inaugural All-Ireland Senior Club Camogie Championship for the leading clubs in the women's team field sport of camogie was won by Celtic, who defeated Deirdre in the final, played at Croke Park. The attendance at the final included Séamus Ó Braonáin, who had refereed the first camogie matches in 1904 and his wife, Brigid Dillon who played in the practice match in the Phoenix Park and the first camogie match in Navan. An anonymous donor provided an unusual silver cup, known as the ‘Jubilee Cup’, which Celtic Camogie Club were allowed to keep.

== Arrangements ==
The championship was organised to mark the Diamond Jubilee of the Camogie Association and followed the traditional provincial system used in Gaelic Games since the 1880s, with Glen Rovers and Newport winning the championships of the other two provinces. Clubs that had won their county championship were eligible to enter the provincial club championship.

== Semi-finals ==
To the fury of the organizers, Newport failed to travel to Belfast for the semi-final. Celtic arrived for the semi-final at Ballinlough to find that no camogie goalposts were available. After some debate, the match went ahead on the full-sized hurling pitch. Celtic led 4–1 to 0–2 at half time. Glen were inspired by Peggy Dorgan at midfield in the second half, equalised with five minutes to go, and forced the match to a replay. In the replay, things looked bad for Celtic when Glen Rovers led by four points with ten minutes to go, Una O'Connor retired with a head injury and Celtic substitute Kit Kehoe celebrated her arrival on the field by first-timing the ball in the direction of her own goal. Luckily for Celtic, Eithne Leech was alert and coped with the unexpected shot. Kit Kehoe then raced to the dropping puck out and doubled on the ball for a goal at the correct end, and followed up by scoring a second with a powerful drive a few minutes later which Deirdre Sutton could not hold and dropped over the line. They added a point on full-time for a three points win.

== The Final ==
Celtic led 2-2 at half time against a Deirdre side that was over-dependent on Sue Ward. A great Sue Ward goal from a 30 proved too late to make much difference. Una O'Connor scored three goals and Mary O'Keeffe two more as Celtic claimed the Jubilee Cup and were allowed to keep it permanently. Agnes Hourigan wrote in the Irish Press:

The main factor in Dublin’s victory was their solid defence which was built around All-Ireland star Ally Hussey who gave a memorable display at centre back never relaxed its grip on Deridre’s attack and was as effective against the wind after the interval as it had proved in the first half. In addition, Celtic had in Una O'Connor a forward in a class of her own. Though closely marked from the start, she was always the obvious threat to Deirdre’s chances, and her first half scores laid the foundations of victory.

== Family links ==
Celtic’s Angela Gill was a daughter of Mick Gill who won All-Ireland hurling medals with Galway and Dublin. Mary Casey was a sister of Bill Casey, who had won an All-Ireland football medal with Dublin in 1963. Claire Heffernan was a sister of star footballer and future Dublin manager Kevin Heffernan.

=== Provincial stages ===
30 August
Leinster

Celtic (Dublin)	3-6 – 0-0	St Colmans (Offaly)

30 August
Munster

Glen Rovers (Cork)	11-2 – 1-1	Croagh (Limerick)

13 September
Ulster

Deirdre (Antrim)	3-2 – 2-1	Iniskeen (Monaghan)

Grattan Park, Belfast

=== Final stages ===
18 October
Semi-Final

Celtic (Dublin)	3-4 – 4-1	Glen Rovers (Cork)

Ballinlough

22 November
Semi-Final Replay

Celtic (Dublin)	5-1 – 4-1	Glen Rovers (Cork)

Parnell Park

13 December
Final

Celtic (Dublin)	5-2 – 1-0	Deirdre (Antrim)

Croke Park

Celtic	Deirdre

Celtic:
GK	1	Eithne Leech
FB	2	Hilda Walsh
RWB	3	Angela Gill
CB	4	Ally Hussey
LWB	5	Dervil Dunne
MF	6	Mary Moran
MF	7	Mary Casey
MF	8	Claire Heffernan
RWF	9	Bríd Hanbury (captain)
CF	10	Mary O'Keeffe (2–1)
LWF	11	Cora Crowe
FF	12	Una O'Connor (3–1)

Deirdre:
GK	1	Kathleen McCartan
FB	2	Nancy Murray
RWB	3	Angela O'Hare
CB	4	Maura McKenna
LWB	5	Kathleen Byrne
MF	6	Babs McCabe
MF	7	Sue Ward (captain) (1–0)
MF	8	Eileen McGrogan
RWF	9	Lily Lanigan
CF	10	Ita Sheridan
LWF	11	Pat Lalor
FF	12	Vera Corscadden

Preceded by None	All-Ireland Senior Club Camogie Championship; 1964 – present	Succeeded by All-Ireland Senior Club Camogie Championship 1965
