= 1896 Limerick Senior Hurling Championship =

Annual hurling competition season

- Champions: Caherline (1st title); M. O'Neill (captain)
- Runners-up: Ballingarry; C. O'Keeffe (captain)

The 1896 Limerick Senior Hurling Championship was the eighth staging of the Limerick Senior Hurling Championship since its establishment by the Limerick County Board in 1887.

St. Michael's were the defending champions.

On 22 November 1896, Caherline won the championship after a 2–06 to 2–01 defeat of Ballingarry in the final. It was their first championship title.

== Results ==
=== Final ===
22 November 1896 Final	Caherline	2–06 – 2–01	Ballingarry	Markets Field, Limerick
