= All-Ireland Senior Club Camogie Championship 2023 =

Inter-county club camogie tournament

All-Ireland Senior Club Hurling Championship 2023
Championship Details
- Dates: 5 November 2023 – 17 December 2023
- Teams: 13

All Ireland Champions
- Winners: Dicksboro

Provincial Champions
- Munster: Sarsfields
- Leinster: Dicksboro
- Ulster: Loughgiel Shamrocks
- Connacht: Not Played

Championship Statistics
- Matches Played: 12

The 2023 All-Ireland Senior Club Camogie Championship was the 60th staging of the All-Ireland Senior Club Camogie Championship, the Camogie Association's premier inter-county club camogie tournament. The championship ran from 5 November 2023 to 17 December 2023.

Dicksboro won the championship for the first time in their history, defeating the 2022 champions Sarsfields in the All-Ireland final.

== Galway Senior Club Camogie Championship ==
Quarter-Finals		Semi-Finals		Final
Mullagh	3-13
Davitts	4-05	Mullagh	1-09
St Thomas'	2-05	Sarsfields	3-16
Sarsfields	4-18			Sarsfields	2-13
Athenry	0-07			Oranmore-Maree	0-07
Clarinbridge	1-03	Ardrahan	3-09
Ardrahan	2-12	Oranmore-Maree	3-14
Oranmore-Maree	3-14

=== Galway quarter-finals ===
Athenry	0-07 (7) – (6) 1-03	Clarinbridge

Ardrahan	2-12 (16) – (23) 3-14	Oranmore-Maree

St Thomas'	2-05 (11) – (30) 4-18	Sarsfields

Mullagh	3-12 (21) – (17) 4-05	Davitts

=== Galway semi-finals ===
Mullagh	1-09 (12) – (25) 3-16	Sarsfields

Athenry	3-09 (18) – (23) 3-14	Oranmore-Maree

=== Galway final ===
22 October 2023	Sarsfields	2-13 (19) – (7) 0-07	Oranmore-Maree
		Report

== Leinster Senior Club Camogie Championship ==
Semi-Finals		Final
Birr (Offaly)	0-05
St Vincents (Dublin)	3-13	Dicksboro (Kilkenny)	0-12
Dicksboro (Kilkenny)	1-10	St Vincents (Dublin)	1-07
St Martin's (Wexford)	0-08

=== Leinster semi-finals ===
5 November 2023	Birr (Offaly)	0-05 (5) – (22) 3-13	St Vincents (Dublin)
		Report		Referee: Barry Nea (Westmeath)

5 November 2023	Dicksboro (Kilkenny)	1-10 (13) – (8) 0-08	St Martin's (Wexford)
		Report		Referee: Ray Kelly (Kildare)

=== Leinster final ===
19 November 2023 Final	Dicksboro (Kilkenny)	0-12 (12) – (10) 1-07	St Vincents (Dublin)
		Report

== Munster Senior Club Camogie Championship ==
Preliminary Round
Truagh Clonlara (Clare)	1-07
Sarsfields (Cork)	1-11

Semi-Finals
Sarsfields (Cork)	0-16
Newcastle West (Limerick)	2-09
Drom & Inch (Tipperary)	1-13
De La Salle (Waterford)	1-11

Final
Sarsfields (Cork)	2-11
Drom & Inch (Tipperary)	2-07

=== Munster Preliminary Round ===
11 November 2023	Truagh Clonlara (Clare)	1-07 (10) – (14) 1-11	Sarsfields (Cork)
		Report

=== Munster semi-finals ===
19 November 2023	Sarsfields (Cork)	0-16 (16) – (15) 2-09	Newcastle West (Limerick)
		Report

19 November 2023	Drom & Inch (Tipperary)	1-13 (16) – (14) 1-11	De La Salle (Waterford)
		Report

=== Munster final ===
26 November 2023	Sarsfields (Cork)	2-11 (17) – (13) 2-07	Drom & Inch (Tipperary)
		Report		Referee: Aaron Hogg (Clare)

== Ulster Senior Club Camogie Championship ==
Semi-Finals		Final
Loughgiel Shamrocks (Antrim)	0-09
Slaughtneil (Derry)	0-05	Loughgiel Shamrocks (Antrim)	0-20
		Liatroim (Down)	0-03

=== Ulster semi-finals ===
5 November 2023	Loughgiel Shamrocks (Antrim)	0-09 (9) – (5) 0-05	Slaughtneil (Derry)
		Report

=== Ulster final ===
19 November 2023	Loughgiel Shamrocks (Antrim)	0-20 (20) – (3) 0-03	Liatroim (Down)
		Report		Referee: P McDonald (Cavan)

== All-Ireland Senior Club Camogie Championship ==
Semi-Finals		Final
Dicksboro (Kilkenny)	2-13
Loughgiel Shamrocks (Antrim)	1-10	Dicksboro (Kilkenny)	0-18
Sarsfields (Galway)	2-10	Sarsfields (Galway)	1-11
Sarsfields (Cork)	1-06

=== All-Ireland semi-finals ===
1 December 2023	Dicksboro (Kilkenny)	2-13 (19) – (13) 1-10	Loughgiel Shamrocks (Antrim)
		Report

2 December 2023	Sarsfields (Galway)	2-10 (16) – (9) 1-06	Sarsfields (Cork)
		Report

=== All-Ireland final ===
17 December 2023	Dicksboro (Kilkenny)	0-18 (18) – (14) 1-11	Sarsfields (Galway)
		Report		Referee: Ray Kelly (Kildare); TV: RTÉ
