= Antrim Senior Camogie Championship =

Annual camogie competition in Ireland

- Code: Camogie
- Founded: 1932
- Region: Antrim (GAA)
- Trophy: O'Duffy Cup
- Title holders: Dunloy (12th title)
- First winner: Creggan
- Most titles: Loughgiel (28 titles)
- Official website: www.aontroimcamogie.com

The Antrim Senior Camogie Championship is the senior Camogie competition featuring clubs affiliated to Antrim Camogie. Loughgiel are the competition's most successful club, having won 28 titles.

Dunloy are the champions, having defeated Ruairí Óg Cushendall in the 2026 final.

The winners of the Antrim Senior Camogie Championship are awarded the O'Duffy Cup.

== Format ==
=== Group stage ===
6 teams play against each other team with 2 points awarded for a win and 1 point for a draw. The top 4 teams advance to the Semi-Finals.

=== Knock-out stage ===
Semi-Final: The 1st placed team faces the 4th placed team and the 2nd placed team faces the third placed team. The winners advance to the Final.

Final: The winners of the Semi-Finals face each other. The winner becomes Antrim Senior Camogie champion and qualifies for the Ulster Senior Club Camogie Championship.

== Teams ==
6 teams participated in the 2026 Antrim Senior Camogie Championship:

Team	Position in 2026	Titles	Last Title
Dunloy	Champion	12	2026
Cushendall	Runners-up	2	1995
Loughgiel	Semi-Final	28	2025
Ballycastle	Semi-Final	—	—
Ahoghill	Group stage	2	1969
Bridini Oga Glenravel	Group stage	—	—

== Roll of honour ==
#	Club	Titles	Years won
1	Loughgiel	28	1947, 1950, 1951, 1953, 1959, 1975, 1984, 1985, 1989, 1990, 1991, 1993, 1997, 2001, 2009, 2011, 2014, 2015, 2016, 2017, 2018, 2019, 2020, 2021, 2022, 2023, 2024, 2025
2	Dunloy	12	1946, 1949, 1955, 1957, 1958, 1961, 1994, 1996, 1998, 1999, 2003, 2026
3	Portglenone	11	1971, 1972, 1974, 1977, 1978, 1979, 1981, 1982, 1983, 1988, 1992
4	O'Donovan Rossa	10	2000, 2002, 2004, 2005, 2006, 2007, 2008, 2010, 2012, 2013
4	Deirdre	10	1937, 1938, 1940, 1962, 1963, 1964, 1965, 1966, 1967, 1968
6	Creggan	9	1932, 1933, 1934, 1935, 1936, 1970, 1973, 1976, 1980
7	St. Teresa's	5	1942, 1943, 1944, 1945, 1952
8	St. Malachy's	3	1954, 1956, 1960
9	Cushendall	2	1986, 1995
9	Ahoghill	2	1948, 1969
9	Gaeil Uladh	2	1939, 1941
12	Ardoyne	1	1987

== Senior Finals Listed By Year ==
Ulster and All-Ireland winners
Ulster winners and All-Ireland finalists
Ulster winners

Year	Winner	Score	Runners up	Score	Venue	Referee	Captain
2026	Dunloy	0-16	Cushendall	0-15	Ballymena	Declan McGarry	Katie Laverty
2025	Loughgiel	4-11	Dunloy	1-17	Portglenone	Owen Elliott	Amy Boyle
2024	Loughgiel	3-11	Dunloy	2-09	Cushendall	Shane McDonald	Christine McCloskey
2023	Loughgiel	3-06	Ballycastle	0-07	Cushendall	Jerome McAllister	Christine Laverty/Una McNaughton
2022	Loughgiel	0-09	Dunloy	0-06	Glenravel	Owen Elliott	Amy Boyle/Lucia McNaughton
2021	Loughgiel	3-12	Dunloy	1-09	Ballymena	Paul O'Neill	Maeve Connolly
2020	Loughgiel	3-11	Ballycastle	2-05	Portglenone	Joe Baldwin	Maeve Connolly
2019	Loughgiel	2-10	Ballycastle	1-09	Armoy	Vincent Boyle	Maeve Connolly
2018	Loughgiel	5-20	Cushendall	1-04	Armoy	Michael Hardy	Maeve Connolly
2017	Loughgiel	4-13	Ballycastle	0-06	Creggan	Paul O'Neill	Emma McFadden
2016	Loughgiel	4-11	Dunloy	2-05	Cushendall	Owen Elliott	Charlene Campbell
2015	Loughgiel	4-11	Ballycastle	0-03	Armoy		Una McNaugton
2014	Loughgiel	4-17	Portglenone	1-03	Ahoghill		Emma McMullan
2013	O'Donovan Rossa	4-11	Portglenone	4-06	Randalstown		Natalie McGuinness
2012	O'Donovan Rossa	5-19	Portglenone	2-04	Creggan		Maria Quinn
2011	Loughgiel	2-09	Portglenone	0-08	Ballymena		Bernie McKinley
2010	O'Donovan Rossa	3-11	Creggan	0-07	Randalstown		Kerrie Connelly
2009	Loughgiel	1-10	O'Donovan Rossa	0-06	Casement Park		Emma Connolly
2008	O'Donovan Rossa	1-13	Dunloy	1-04	Randalstown		Jane Adams
2007	O'Donovan Rossa	1-13	Loughgiel		Carey		Jane Adams
2006	O'Donovan Rossa	3-10	Dunloy	2-05			Jane Adams
2005	O'Donovan Rossa	1-13	Loughgiel	0-02			Ciara McGinley
2004	O'Donovan Rossa	2-12	Dunloy	1-13	Corrigan Park		Ciara McGinley
2003	Dunloy	3-06	Rossa	0-08	Loughgiel		Majella Connolly
2002	O'Donovan Rossa	1-09	Loughgiel	2-04			Ciara Gault
2001	Loughgiel	0-11 (Replay)	Dunloy	1-07 (Replay)	Portglenone	Aoife Woods	Nula McCloskey
2000	O'Donovan Rossa	2-14	Cushendall	0-03			Ciara Gault
1999	Dunloy	5-15	Loughgiel	1-06	Rasharkin		Sinead McMullan
1998	Dunloy	2-09	Loughgiel	3-05	Cushendall		Elaine Dowds
1997	Loughgiel	3-06	Rossa	1-06	Dunloy		Claire McGarry
1996	Dunloy	2-07	Loughgiel	1-08	Glenravel	Liz Gibson	Joan Elliott
1995	Ruairí Óg Cushendall	2-6	Dunloy	0-10	Loughgiel	Tommy McIntyre	Una McCambridge
1994	Dunloy	1-09	Cushendall	1-04	Glenravel		Anne McKee
1993	Loughgiel	4-5 (Replay); 3-5	Dunloy	3-5 (Replay); 3-5			Imelda Gillan
1992	Portglenone	1-07	Loughgiel	0-08	Rasharkin		Bernie Doherty
1991	Loughgiel	3-13	Portglenone	2-02	Rasharkin		Alieen McGarry
1990	Loughgiel	1-08	Portglenone	0-07	Dunloy		Bernie Dickson
1989	Loughgiel	3-08	Portglenone	3-05			
1988	Portglenone	2-09 (Replay); 3-09	Loughgiel	4-01 (Replay); 5-05	Rasharkin		Anne McGarry
1987	Ardoyne		Portglenone				
1986	Ruairí Óg Cushendall		Ardoyne		Rasharkin		
1985	Loughgiel	5-01	Ardoyne	2-03	Rasharkin		
1984	Loughgiel	5-00	Ardoyne	2-04	Glenravel		
1983	Portglenone		Cushendall		Dunloy		Catherine Mulholland
1982	Portglenone		Loughgiel		Rasharkin		Anne Kelly
1981	Portglenone		Cushendall		Randalstown		Jackie Craig
1980	Creggan		Portglenone		Glenariffe		
1979	Portglenone		Creggan		Glenariffe		Edna Webb
1978	Portglenone	5-03	Loughgiel	2-04	Glenariffe		Ann Marie O Neill
1977	Portglenone		Creggan		Glenariffe		Claire McIlvenna
1976	Creggan	6-03	Dunloy		Glenariffe		Maureen O'Hara
1975	Loughgiel	6-01	Portglenone	4-02	Glenariffe		
1974	Portglenone		Creggan		Glenariffe		Mairead McAtamney
1973	Creggan		Dunloy		Glenariffe		Máiréad Diamond
1972	Portglenone		Ahoghill		Glenariffe		Mairead McAtamney
1971	Portglenone		Deirdre		Glenariffe		Mairead McAtamney
1970	Creggan		St Malachys		Randalstown		
1969	Ahoghill		Creggan				
1968	Deirdre						Sue Cashman
1967	Deirdre	5-02	Creggan	1-02	Glenariffe		Sue Cashman
1966	Deirdre		Ahoghill				Sue Ward
1965	Deirdre						Sue Ward
1964	Deirdre						Sue Ward
1963	Deirdre						
1962	Deirdre						
1961	Dunloy						
1960	St. Malachy's						
1959	Loughgiel	5-00	Dunloy	3-01			
1958	Dunloy	3-01	St Malachys	2-02	McRory Park		
1957	Dunloy	3-01	St Malachys	2-02	Dunloy		
1956	St. Malachy's	4-00	Dunloy	2-04			
1955	Dunloy	7-02	St. Malachy's	3-00			
1954	St. Malachy's		Dunloy				
1953	Loughgiel	5-01	St Teresa's	2-00			
1952	St. Teresa's	3-01	Ahoghill	3-01			
1951	Loughgiel	9-00	Ahoghill	3-00			
1950	Loughgiel	6-00	Deirdre	5-01			
1949	Dunloy		Loughgiel				
1948	Ahoghill						
1947	Loughgiel	7-01 (replay)	Ahoghill	2-00 (replay)			
1946	Dunloy	7-03	Ahoghill	1-00	Dunloy		
1945	St. Teresa's	5-03	Ballycastle	0-01			
1944	St. Teresa's	3-02	Dunloy	3-00			
1943	St. Teresa's						
1942	St. Teresa's						
1941	Gaeil Uladh						
1940	Deirdre						
1939	Gaeil Uladh						
1938	Deirdre						
1937	Deirdre						
1936	Creggan						
1935	Creggan						
1934	Creggan						
1933	Creggan						
1932	Creggan						

== Intermediate Finals Listed By Year ==
Ulster and All-Ireland winners
Ulster winners and All-Ireland finalists
Ulster winners

Year	Winner	Score	Runners up	Score	Venue	Referee	Captain
2026	Loughgiel	0-12	Dunloy	1-06	Ahoghill	Sean McLaren	Sarah Flavin
2025	Bridini Oga Glenravel	1-12	Loughgiel	0-10	Ahoghill	Paul O'Neill	Torie Edgar
2024	Ahoghill	3-07	Loughgiel	0-09	Portglenone	Owen Elliott	Éadaoin McGarry
2023	Loughgiel	1-16	Cargin	0-09	Dunsilly	Fionntan Mc Cotter	Finvolla McVey
2022	Bridini Oga Glenravel	2-09	Portglenone	0-11	Ballymena	Paul O'Neill	Kirsty Laverty
2021	Loughgiel	2-11	Rossa	1-08	Davitt Park	Vincent Boyle	Ciara Boyle
2020	Tir Na nOg	4-11	Rossa	3-06	Ballymena	Darren Mullan	
2019	Loughgiel	3-13	Bridini Og Glenravel	1-10	Ahoghill	Paul O'Neill	Claire McKillop
2018	Loughgiel	3-06	Bridini Og Glenravel	2-04	Portglenone	John McHenry	
2017	Loughgiel	6-08	Bridini Og Glenravel	1-04	Creggan	Jimmy Totten	
2016	St Johns	1-10	Loughgiel	0-07	Ballymena		Maedhbh Laverty
2015	Loughgiel		Creggan		Ahoghill		Cara McIntyre
2014	Loughgiel						
2013	St Johns	4-19	Ballycastle	0-05	Ballymena	Vincent Boyle	Helen Wilson
2012	Loughgiel						
2011	Ruairí Óg Cushendall	3-14	Ahoghill	2-04			Naomi McCurry
2010	Randalstown						
2009	Loughgiel	3-03	Dunloy	0-05	Cloughmills		
2008	Loughgiel						
2007	Loughgiel						
2006							
2005			Armoy				
2004	Ballycastle	2-11	Loughgiel	2-02	Corrigan Park		Katrina Boylan
2003	St Johns						
2002							
2001							
2000							
1999	Cushendall		Ardyone		Corrigan Park		

== Junior Finals Listed By Year ==
Ulster Bridie McMenamin shield winners
Ulster Bridie McMenamin shield finalist

Year	Winner	Score	Runners up	Score	Venue	Referee	Captain
2026	St Johns	5-08	Loughgiel	0-09	Ahoghill	Ryan O'Reilly	Aine Dudley
2025	Sarsfields	4-11	Loughgiel	3-06	St Endas	Ryan O'Reilly	Frances Ramsey
2024	St Pauls	2-09	Ballycastle	0-07	Rasharkin	Paul O'Neill	Emer Rocks
2023	Rasharkin	3-05	St Pauls	1-07	Portglenone	Vincent Boyle	Shariffa O’Kane
2022	Ruairí Óg Cushendall	5-13	Loughgiel	2-01	Portglenone		Orla McKenna
2021	St Johns	4-08	Loughgiel	4-07	Ballymena	Anthony McAuley	Sarah Jane McGuigan
2020	Creggan	3-11	St Johns	0-05	Portglenone	Francis Traynor	Ciara McCollum
2019	Ahoghill	4-14	Creggan	0-07	Portglenone	Vincent Boyle	Fiona Blaney
2018	Loughgiel	8-11	Bridini Oga Glenravel	2-10	Cloughmills	Owen Elliott	Brona McIntyre
2017	Dunloy	2-07	Loughgiel	0-05	Ahoghill	Harry Graham	Jessica Rush
2016	Bridini Oga Glenravel	5-10	Dunloy	3-03	Portglenone		Shauna Kelly
2015	Cargan	4-06	Bridini Og Glenravel	0-08	Randalstown	Colm Cunning	Marua Creelman
2014	Loughgiel		Ahoghill		Glenravel	Ryan O'Reilly	Sarah Ann McGarry
2013	Loughgiel		Dunloy		Cloughmills		Sarah Ann McGarry
2012	Armoy	3-06	Rasharkin	2-04	Cloughmills	John McKillop	Paula Scally
2011	St Pauls		Rasharkin		Creggan	Gerard Armstrong	Grainne Reilly
2010	Tir Na nOg, Randalstown						
2009							
2008	Dunloy		Gortnamona		Ballycastle		Charleen O'Kane/Wendy McAuley
2007	Portglenone	2-07	Dunloy	1-04	Rasharkin		
2006	Creggan						
2005							
2004							
2003	Loughgiel		St Pauls		Corrigan Park		Karen McCormick
2002	Ballycastle	3-13	Armoy	0-01	Loughgiel		Louise Dornan
2001							
2000	Tir Na nOg, Randalstown						
1999	Ahoghill		Dunloy		Rasharking		
1998	Ardyone		St Johns		St Pauls		
1997	Creggan		Ardyone		Ballymena		
1996	Glenariffe	3-09	Loughgiel	2-04	Cushendall		
1995	Loughgiel	3-08	Creggan	2-10	Ballymena		Anne McQuillan
1994	Deirdre						
1993							
1992	Dunloy	10-07	Rossa	0-03			
1991	Rossa	2-08	Dunloy	2-04			
1990							
1989	Loughgiel	4-05	Rossa	2-01			
1988							
1987							
1986							
1985							
1984	Dunloy						
1983	All Saints		Ardyone				
1982							
1981							
1980	Ardyone	12-08	Portglenone	0-00			

== Junior B Finals Listed By Year ==
Year	Winner	Score	Runners up	Score	Venue	Referee	Captain
2026	St Galls	3-07	St Endas	1-09	Sarsfields	Lee O'Reilly	Naimh Semple
2025	All Saints	3-07	St Galls	2-04	Rasharkin	Vincent Boyle	Roisin Ward
2024	Lámh Dhearg	6-14	Loch Mór Dál gCais	2-08	Gort NaMona	Grainne Connolly	
2023	Moneyglass	2-08	Sarsfields	1-04	Randalstown	Declan McGarry	Megan McGlinchey
2022	St Johns Carnlough	2-06	Davitt’s	3-01	Cargin	Anthony McAuley	Sian McNeill
2021	All Saints	4-04	Moneyglass	2-09	Portglenone	John McKendry	Sianeese Maybin
