= All-Ireland Senior Club Camogie Championship 1993 =

Camogie championship

Winners
- Champions: Glen Rovers) (4th title)
- Manager: Noel Lynam
- Captain: Lynn Dunlea

Runners-up
- Runners-up: Mullagh (Gal)

The 1993 All-Ireland Senior Club Camogie Championship for the leading clubs in the women's team field sport of camogie was won by Glen Rovers, who defeated Mullagh from Galway in the final, played at Ballinasloe.

== Arrangements ==
The championship was organised on the traditional provincial system used in Gaelic Games since the 1880s, with the other two provinces Connacht and Leinster represented by Loughgiel and Lisdowney, who had the services of four players from the disbanded St Paul’s, Ann Downey, Clare Jones, Angela Downey and Noelle O'Driscoll. Lynn Dunlea who had joined Glen Rovers from the Cloughduv club scored 4-3 for Glen as they defeated Lisdowney in the semi-final.

== The Final ==
Denise Cronin dominated midfield and the speedy and skilful forwards ran up a big score in the final.

=== Final stages ===
September 1
Semi-Final

Glen Rovers	6-10 – 2-3	Lisdowney

Blackpool

September 8
Semi-Final

Mullagh (Gal)	1-13 – 1-4	Loughgiel

Loughrea

November 21
Final

Glen Rovers	6-12 – 0-2	Mullagh (Gal)

Ballinasloe

Glen Rovers
Mullagh

Glen Rovers:
GK	1	Mairéad O'Leary
FB	2	Mary Ring
RWB	3	Deirdre McCarthy
CB	4	Sandie Fitzgibbon
LWB	5	Diane Deane
MF	6	Mandy Kennefick
MF	7	Therese O'Callaghan
MF	8	Ann Coleman
RWF	9	Linda Mellerick
CF	10	Denise Cronin
LWF	11	Patricia Murphy
FF	12	Claire McCarthy

Mullagh (Gal):
GK	1	Caroline Loughnane
FB	2	Sheila Coen
RWB	3	Deirdre Hardiman
CB	4	Pamela Nevin (captain)
LWB	5	Bridget Fahy
MF	6	Ruth Cahalan
MF	7	Alice Murphy
MF	8	Cora Curley
RWF	9	Aideen Murphy
CF	10	Emer Hardiman
LWF	11	Imelda Hobbins
FF	12	Madge Kennedy

Preceded by All-Ireland Senior Club Camogie Championship 1992	All-Ireland Senior Club Camogie Championship; 1964 – present	Succeeded by All-Ireland Senior Club Camogie Championship 1994
