= All-Ireland Senior Club Camogie Championship 1965 =

Camogie championship

Winners
- Champions: St Patrick’s Glengoole (Tipperary) (1st title)
- Captain: Ann Carroll

Runners-up
- Runners-up: Deirdre (Antrim)

The 1965 All-Ireland Senior Club Camogie Championship for the leading clubs in the women's team field sport of camogie was won by St Patrick’s Glengoole (Tipperary), who defeated Deirdre (Antrim) in the final, played at Casement Park.

== Arrangements ==
The championship was organised on the traditional provincial system used in Gaelic Games since the 1880s, with St Rita’s and St Ibar’s winning the championships of the other two provinces.

== The Final ==
Scores were level at half time in the final, 1-3 to 2-0. Agnes Hourigan, president of the Camogie Association, wrote in the Irish Press:

The winners deserved the honours because they were always that shade faster to the ball, bur Deirdre, now runners-up in an All Ireland final for the second successive year, went down fighting magnificently. St Patrick’s had the star of the game in their captain, Anne Carroll, a wizard at midfield.

=== Provincial stages ===
August 28
Munster

St Patrick’s Glengoole (Tipperary)	4-7 – 4-1	Glen Rovers (Cork)

=== Final stages ===
September 1
Semi-Final

St Patrick’s Glengoole (Tipperary)	12-4 – 1-2	St Rita’s (Galway)

Carramore

September 8
Semi-Final

Deirdre (Antrim)	4-4 – 1-2	St Ibar’s (Wexford)

Wexford Park

October 17
Final

St Patrick’s Glengoole (Tipperary)	3-3 – 2-3	Deirdre (Antrim)

Casement Park

St Patrick’s Glengoole	Deirdre

St Patrick’s Glengoole
GK	1	Sally Long
FB	2	Anna Graham
RWB	3	Monica Ryan
CB	4	Maura Maher
LWB	5	Mary Graham
MF	6	Ann Carroll (captain) (1–3)
MF	7	Peggy Graham (1–0)
MF	8	Kathleen Griffin
RWF	9	Brenie Moloney
CF	10	Margo Loughnane
LWF	11	Alica Long (1–0)
FF	12	Lucy Scott

Deirdre (Antrim):
GK	1	Kathleen McCartan
FB	2	Nancy Murray
RWB	3	Briege Gilmore
CB	4	Maura McKenna
LWB	5	Babs McCabe
MF	6	Kathleen Byrne
MF	7	Sue Ward
MF	8	Ellen McGrogan
RWF	9	Ita Lanigan
CF	10	Kathleen McManus
LWF	11	Ellen Doran
FF	12	Christine Wheeler

Preceded by All-Ireland Senior Club Camogie Championship 1964	All-Ireland Senior Club Camogie Championship; 1964 – present	Succeeded by All-Ireland Senior Club Camogie Championship 1966
