= All-Ireland Senior Club Camogie Championship 2001 =

Camogie championship

Winners
- Champions: Pearses (Galway) (4th title)
- Captain: Áine Hillary

Runners-up
- Runners-up: Cashel (Tip)

The 2001 All-Ireland Senior Club Camogie Championship for the leading clubs in the women's team field sport of camogie was won by Pearses of Galway, who defeated Cashel of Tipperary in the final, played at Cashel .

== Arrangements ==
The championship was organised on the traditional provincial system used in Gaelic Games since the 1880s, with Keady Lámh Dhearg (of Antrim) and St Ibar’s (of Wexford) winning the championships of the other two provinces.

== The Final ==
It was one of the most dramatic finals in club championship history, Clare Grogan scored an injury time equaliser for Cashel, followed by Carmel Hannon’s dramatic injury time winning point, and Patricia Burke’s goal line clearance.

=== Final stages ===
September 1
Semi-Final

Pearses (Gal)	4–14 – 1–6	Keady Lámh Dhearg (Antrim)

Ballymacward

September 8
Semi-Final

Cashel (Tipperary)	1–15 – 1–9	St Ibar’s (Wexford)

November 4
Final

Pearses (Gal)	2–8 – 0–13	Cashel (Tipperary)

Cashel

Pearses	Cashel (Tipperary)

Pearses (Gal):
GK	1	Caroline Cunniffe
RCB	2	Síle Barrett
FB	3	Aisling Ward
LCB	4	Patricia Burke
RWB	5	Martina Haverty
CB	6	Tracey Laheen
LWB	7	Martina Harkin
MF	8	Michelle Glynn
MF	9	Veronica Sweeney
RWF	10	Orla Kilkenny
CF	11	Áine Hillary (captain)
LWF	12	Carmel Hannon
RCF	13	Shauna Ward
FF	14	Sharon Glynn
LCF	15	Lorraine Lally

Cashel (Tipperary):
GK	1	Sandra Ricken
RCB	2	Michelle Kennedy
FB	3	Jovita Delaney
LCB	4	Kaiffee Moloney
RWB	5	Helen Breen
CB	6	Una O’Dwyer
LWB	7	Triona Bonnar
MF	8	Emily Hayden
MF	9	Paula Bulfin
RWF	10	Philly Fogarty (0–1)
CF	11	Mairéad Morrissey
LWF	12	Clare Grogan (0–11)
RCF	13	Libby Twomey (0–1)
FF	14	Linda Grogan
LCF	15	Helen Grogan

Preceded by All-Ireland Senior Club Camogie Championship 2000	All-Ireland Senior Club Camogie Championship; 1964 – present	Succeeded by All-Ireland Senior Club Camogie Championship 2002
