= All-Ireland Senior Club Camogie Championship 2006 =

Camogie championship

Winners
- Champions: St Lachtain's, Freshford (Kilkenny) (3rd title)
- Captain: Imelda Kennedy

Runners-up
- Runners-up: O'Donovan Rossa (Antrim)

The 2006 All-Ireland Senior Club Camogie Championship for the leading clubs in the women's team field sport of camogie was won for the third year in succession by St Lachtain’s, Freshford (Kilkenny), who defeated O'Donovan Rossa (Antrim) in the final, played at Portlaoise.

== Arrangements ==
The championship was organised on the traditional provincial system used in Gaelic Games since the 1880s, with Cashel and Athenry winning the championships of the other two provinces. Freshford qualified for the final when sun blinded the Cashel goalkeeper, Jovita Delaney, enabling Imelda Kennedy’s speculative shot to drop under the bar for the only goal of the semi-final.

== Final ==
Hailstones and high winds made playing conditions difficult in the final. Marie O'Connor’s goal at the start of the second half gave the initiative to Freshford, as Orla McCall goal in reply was Rossa’s last score of the match and St Lachtain’s picked off further points by Imelda Kennedy, Sinéad Connery and Ann Dalton.

=== Final stages ===
September 1
Semi-Final

St Lachtain’s, Freshford (Kilkenny)	1-8 – 0-10	Cashel

McDonagh Park Nenagh

September 8
Semi-Final

O'Donovan Rossa (Antrim)	3-11 – 2-11	Athenry

Drumlane

November 19
Final

St Lachtain’s, Freshford (Kilkenny)	1-5 – 1-3	O'Donovan Rossa (Antrim)

Portlaoise

St Lachtain’s, Freshford	O’Donovan Rossa

St Lachtain’s
GK	1	Laura Comerford
RCB	2	[Sinéad Cash
FB	3	Gillian Maher
LCB	4	Fiona Dowling
RWB	5	Margaret McCarthy
CB	6	Mairéad Costello
LWB	7	Áine Connery
MF	8	Esther Costello
MF	9	Aoife Fitzpatrick
RWF	10	Deidre Delaney
CF	11	Sinéad Connery
LWF	12	Imelda Kennedy
RCF	13	Ann Dalton
FF	14	Marie O'Connor
LCF	15	Eileen Fitzpatrick

O’Donovan Rossa
GK	1	Teresa McGowan
RCB	2	Pauline Green
FB	3	Hannah Healy
LCB	4	Shauneen McGourty
RWB	5	Ciara Gault
CB	6	Maureen Stewart
LWB	7	Aisling McCall
MF	8	Colleen Doherty
MF	9	Seáinín Daykin
RWF	10	Mairéad Rainey
CF	11	Gráinne Connolly
LWF	12	Fiona Kennedy
RCF	13	Mairiosa McGourty
FF	14	Jane Adams
LCF	15	Orla McCall

Preceded by All-Ireland Senior Club Camogie Championship 2005	All-Ireland Senior Club Camogie Championship; 1964 – present	Succeeded by All-Ireland Senior Club Camogie Championship 2007
