= All-Ireland Senior Club Camogie Championship 1994 =

Camogie championship

Winners
- Champions: Lisdowney (1st title)
- Manager: Catherine Dunne

Runners-up
- Runners-up: Glen Rovers

The 1994 All-Ireland Senior Club Camogie Championship for the leading clubs in the women's team field sport of camogie was won by Lisdowney, who defeated Glen Rovers in the final, played at Ballyragget, after one of the most spectacular comebacks in the history of Gaelic Games.

== Arrangements ==
The championship was organised on the traditional provincial system used in Gaelic Games since the 1880s, with Dunloy and Pearses winning the championships of the other two provinces. Marina Downey scored 4–5 and Angela Downey 3–6 in Lisdowney's semi-final victory over Dunloy, while Sinéad McMullan (1–2) and Majella McMullan (1–1) scored for Dunloy. Glen Rovers goalkeeper Máiread O'Leary helped secure their place in the final, with a series of reflex saves against Pearses.

== The Final ==
Angela Downey scored four goals for Lisdowney in her last club final appearance, helping Lisdowney back from an astonishing ten points down. Glen led by 1–10 to 0–6 at half time.

=== Final stages ===
September 1
Semi-Final

Lisdowney	7-14 – 2-4	Dunloy

September 8
Semi-Final

Glen Rovers	0-12 – 1-4	Pearses

November 20
Final

Lisdowney	5-9 – 1-15	Glen Rovers

Ballyragget

Lisdowney	Glen Rovers

Lisdowney:
GK	1	Veronica Wall
FB	2	Caroline Glendon
RWB	3	Brigid Wall
CB	4	Bridget Barnaville
LWB	5	Fran Shore
MF	6	Catherine Dunne (captain)
MF	7	Ann Downey
MF	8	Sandra Gleeson
RWF	9	Marina Downey
CF	10	Áine Dunne
LWF	11	Angela Downey
FF	12	Ann Marie Hughes

Glen Rovers:
GK	1	Mairéad O'Leary
FB	2	Deirdre McCarthy
RWB	3	Mary Ring
CB	4	Stephanie Dunlea
LWB	5	Sandie Fitzgibbon (captain)
MF	6	Denise Cronin
MF	7	Therese O'Callaghan
MF	8	Patricia Murphy
RWF	9	Linda Mellerick
CF	10	Lynn Dunlea
LWF	11	Ger McCarthy
FF	12	Claire McCarthy

Preceded by All-Ireland Senior Club Camogie Championship 1993	All-Ireland Senior Club Camogie Championship; 1964 – present	Succeeded by All-Ireland Senior Club Camogie Championship 1995
