= All-Ireland Senior Club Camogie Championship 1967 =

Camogie championship

Winners
- Champions: Eoghan Rua (Dublin) (1st title)
- Captain: Ailish Toner

Runners-up
- Runners-up: Oranmore (Galway)

The 1967 All-Ireland Senior Club Camogie Championship for the leading clubs in the women's team field sport of camogie was won by Eoghan Rua (Dublin), who defeated Oranmore (Galway) in a replayed final. The drawn match was played at Parnell Park and the replay at Ballinasloe

== Arrangements ==
The championship was organised on the traditional provincial system used in Gaelic Games since the 1880s, with Glen Rovers and Deirdre winning the championships of the other two provinces.

== The Final ==
There was controversy that members of the Camogie Association Central Council decided extra time should be played at the end of the drawn final. Oranmore refused to play extra time and were granted a replay after an investigation into whether the respective team captains had been notified of the extra time arrangement in advance. The perception was that Oranmore, who led by four points with five minutes to go, had most to lose from the replay, Eoghan Rua having come back with a goal from Dolores Barber and a point from a 30 from Margaret O'Leary seconds from time.

Agnes Hourigan wrote in the Irish Press:

There was an unsatisfactory ending to an All-Ireland Club camogie championship final at Parnell Park when, after the game ende din a draw, Galway champions Oranmore did not come out to play extra time. The referee Mrs Bernie Byrne (Monaghan) had informed the teams prior to the start of the game that extra time would be played if scores were level at the end of the 50 minutes but when the field was cleared, only Dublin champions Eoghan Ruadh lined out. The Oranmore team had by then left the pitch. The game itself had been fast and spectacular with the girls from the west slightly better strikers than the Leinster champions. Oranmore played with great confidence against the sharp wind in the opening half, and at the interval, seemed almost certain to win when Eoghan Ruadh could only lead 0-2 to 0-1. The Dubliners were heartened by a great goal by Kathleen Lyons immediately after the restart.

== The Replay ==
Eoghan Rua had the replay won at half time, scoring 6-2 in the first half without reply at Duggan Park, Ballinasloe. Oranmore were without three of the team that had drawn the final four months earlier.

Agnes Hourigan wrote in the Irish Press:

Backed by a strong wind, Eoghan Ruadh, playing like champions, were the superior side from the start. Faster to the ball, they lasted the fast pace better, and their excellent co ordination was more than Oranmore could match. In addition their forwards controlled the ball magnificently, despite the strong breeze. Twenty points down at the half time, Oranmore never measured up to their stiff second half task, although they battled courageously to the final whistle.

=== Provincial stages ===
September 10
Leinster

Eoghan Ruadh (Dublin)	2-5 – 2-2	St Paul’s (Kilkenny)

Parnell Park

August 27
Munster

Glen Rovers (Cork)	7-4 – 1-1	Ahane (Limerick)

=== Final stages ===
September 1
Semi-Final

Eoghan Rua (Dublin)	4-4 – 2-4	Glen Rovers (Cork)

Togher

September 8
Semi-Final

Oranmore (Galway)	4-1 – 2-4	Deirdre (Antrim)

Corrigan Park

November 6
Final

Eoghan Rua (Dublin)	3-4 – 4-1	Oranmore (Galway)

Parnell Park

March 31, 1968
Final Replay

Eoghan Rua (Dublin)	7-3 – 4-1	Oranmore (Galway)

Ballinasloe

Eoghan Rua	Oranmore

Eoghan Rua (Dublin):
GK	1	Anne Carey
FB	2	Maureen Kearns
RWB	3	Pat Rafferty
CB	4	Margaret O'Leary
LWB	5	Anne Ashton
MF	6	Maureen Murphy
MF	7	Ailish Toner (captain)
MF	8	Kay Lyons
RWF	9	Phyllis Breslin
CF	10	Connie Lyons
LWF	11	Jean Foley
FF	12	Delores Barber

Oranmore (Galway):
GK	1	Joan Cosgrove
FB	2	Rita Linnane
RWB	3	Rita O'Flaherty
CB	4	Grace Divilly
LWB	5	Kay Quinn
MF	6	Rosemary Divilly
MF	7	Ann Dillon
MF	8	Kathleen O'Flaherty
RWF	9	Sheila Quinn
CF	10	Mary Mahon
LWF	11	Kay McGrath
FF	12	Mary Forde

Preceded by All-Ireland Senior Club Camogie Championship 1966	All-Ireland Senior Club Camogie Championship; 1964 – present	Succeeded by All-Ireland Senior Club Camogie Championship 1968
