= 2015 Antrim Senior Hurling Championship =

Annual hurling competition season

- Dates: 29 August 2015 – 27 September 2015
- Teams: 8
- Champions: Ruairí Óg, Cushendall (13th title); Seán Delargy and Arron Graffin (captain); John McKillop (manager)
- Runners-up: McQuillan Ballycastle; Ryan McGarry (captain); Ronan Donnelly (manager)

Tournament statistics
- Goals scored: 22
- Points scored: 213

The 2015 Antrim Senior Hurling Championship was the 115th staging of the Antrim Senior Hurling Championship since its establishment by the Antrim County Board in 1901. The championship began on 29 August 2015 and ended on 27 September 2015.

The championship was won by Ruairí Óg, Cushendall who secured the title following a 2–16 to 1–15 defeat of McQuillan Ballycastle in the final. This was their 13th championship title and their second in succession.

== Results ==
=== Quarter-finals ===
29 August 2015 Quarter-final	O'Donovan Rossa	0-8 - 2-12	McQuillan Ballycastle	Corrigan Park
16:30				Referee: F McCotter

29 August 2015 Quarter-final	St Gall's	0-15 - 1-23	Loughgiel Shamrocks	Corrigan Park
18:30				Referee: O Elliott

30 August 2015 Quarter-final	Dunloy	4-23 - 2-13	Clooney Gaels	Fr. Healy Park
14:30				Referee: L McAuley

30 August 2015 Quarter-final	Ruairí Óg, Cushendall	4-10 - 2-15	St John's	Pearse Park
18:30				Referee: C Cunning

=== Semi-finals ===
12 September 2015 Semi-final	Dunloy	2-15 - 2-19	McQuillan Ballycastle	Fr. Healy Park
17:00

13 September 2015 Semi-final	Loughgiel Shamrocks	Abandoned	Ruairí Óg, Cushendall	Pearse Park
17:00

20 September 2015 Semi-final refixture	Loughgiel Shamrocks	0-14 - 0-15	Ruairí Óg, Cushendall	Pearse Park
13:00				Referee: M O'Neill

=== Final ===
27 September 2015 Final	McQuillan Ballycastle	1-15 - 2-16	Ruairí Óg, Cushendall	Pearse Park
15:00
