= All-Ireland Club Championship =

The All-Ireland Club Finals may refer to:

- All-Ireland Senior Club Football Championship
- All-Ireland Senior Club Hurling Championship
- All-Ireland Senior Club Camogie Championship
