= Arron Graffin =

Irish hurler

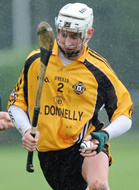
- Graffin representing Ulster in the 2008 Railway Cup hurling semi-final

Personal information
- Native name: Arron Mac Dhuifinn (Irish)
- Born: 1989 (age 36–37) Cushendall, County Antrim, Northern Ireland
- Occupation: Transport co-ordinator
- Height: 5 ft 11 in (180 cm)

Sport
- Sport: Hurling
- Position: Full-back
Club
- Years: Club
- Ruairí Óg
Club titles
- Antrim titles: 4
- Ulster titles: 3
Inter-county*
| Years | County | Apps (scores) |
| 2007-present | Antrim | 26 (0-4) |
Inter-county titles
- Ulster titles: 4
- All-Irelands: 0
- NHL: 0
- All Stars: 0
- *Inter County team apps and scores correct as of 20:33, 5 October 2014.

Arron Graffin (born 1988) is an Irish hurler who plays as a full-back for the Antrim senior team.

Born in Cushendall, County Antrim, Graffin first arrived on the inter-county scene at the age of sixteen when he first linked up with the Antrim minor team, before later lining out with the under-21 side. He made his senior debut during the 2007 championship. Graffin immediately became a regular member of the starting fifteen and has won six Ulster medals.

As a member of the Ulster team, Graffin has lined out in the inter-provincial championship on a number of occasions. At club level he is a two-time Ulster medallist with Ruairí Óg. In addition to this Graffin has also won three championship medals with the club.

== Honours ==
=== Team ===
Antrim

- Ulster Senior Club Hurling Championship (3): 2006, 2008, 2015
- Antrim Senior Club Hurling Championship (4): 2006, 2008, 2014 (c), 2015

Antrim

- Ulster Senior Hurling Championship (4): 2008, 2009, 2012, 2014
- Walsh Cup (1): 2008
- Ulster Under-21 Hurling Championship (2): 2009 (c), 2010
- Ulster Minor Hurling Championship (2): 2006, 2007
