= All-Ireland Senior Club Camogie Championship 2008 =

Camogie championship

Winners
- Champions: Rossa (Antrim) (1st title)
- Manager: Mickey McCullough
- Captain: Jane Adams

Runners-up
- Runners-up: Drom & Inch (Tip)

The 2008 All-Ireland Senior Club Camogie Championship for the leading clubs in the women's team field sport of camogie was won by Rossa (Ant), who defeated Drom & Inch (Tip) by six points in the final, played at Mullingar.

== Arrangements ==
The championship was organised on the traditional provincial system used in Gaelic Games since the 1880s, with Ballyboden St Endas (Dub) and Athenry) winning the championships of the other two provinces. Jane Adams scored 2–11 in Rossa’s defeat of Ballyboden in the semi-final. Joanne Ryan sent a long ball in to Siobhán McGrath for Dorm and Inch’s winning goal against Athenry in their semi-final.

== The Final ==
Jane Adams scored 2–9 for Rossa as they dominated the final.

=== Final stages ===
September 1
Semi-Final

Rossa (Ant)	3-18 – 0-6	Ballyboden St Endas (Dub)

September 8
Semi-Final

Drom & Inch (Tip)	1-8 – 0-10	Athenry)

November 16
Final

Rossa (Ant)	2-15 – 1-12	Drom & Inch (Tip)

Mullingar

Rossa (Ant)	Drom & Inch (Tip)

Rossa (Ant):
GK	1	Teresa McGowan
RCB	2	Teresa Adams
FB	3	Pauline Green
LCB	4	Maureen Quinn
RWB	5	Aisling McCall
CB	6	Natalie McGuinness
LWB	7	Bronagh Orchin
MF	8	Colleen Doherty
MF	9	Seáinín Daykin
RWF	10	Kerrie O'Neill (0–1)
CF	11	Gráinne Connolly (0–2)
LWF	12	Orla McCall
RCF	13	Maorisa McGourty (0–2)
FF	14	Jane Adams (capt) (2–9)
LCF	15	Maureen Stewart (0–1)

Drom & Inch (Tip):
GK	1	Rosie Kennedy
RCB	2	Caitríona Kennedy
FB	3	Niamh Harkin
LCB	4	Patricia McGrath
RWB	5	Sinéad O'Meara
CB	6	Michelle Shortt
LWB	7	Triona Butler
MF	8	Therese Shortt (0–7)
MF	9	Norma Harrington
RWF	10	Joanne Ryan (0–3)
CF	11	Mary Looby (1–2)
LWF	12	Geraldine Kinnane
RCF	13	Catríona Shortt
FF	14	Emer Shanahan
LCF	15	Siobhán McGrath

Preceded by All-Ireland Senior Club Camogie Championship 2007	All-Ireland Senior Club Camogie Championship; 1964 – present	Succeeded by All-Ireland Senior Club Camogie Championship 2009
