= Una O'Connor =

Una O'Connor may refer to:

- Una O'Connor (actress) (1880–1959), Irish actress
- Úna O'Connor (camogie) (born 1938), former Irish camogie player
