= Sue Cashman =

Irish camogie player

Personal information
- Native name: Sú Ní Chiosain (Irish)
- Born: Antrim, Northern Ireland

Sport
- Sport: Camogie
- Position: Centre field
Club*
Years	Club	Apps (scores)
	Deirdre	?
Inter-county**
Years	County	Apps (scores)
	Antrim	?
- * club appearances and scores correct as of (16:31, 30 June 2010 (UTC)). **Inter County team apps and scores correct as of (16:31, 30 June 2010 (UTC)).

Sue Cashman, née Ward, is a former camogie player, winner of Caltex Player of the Year award in 1967, only the second of five camogie players in history to be awarded what would later become known as the Texaco Award. She also won an All Ireland medal in 1967 when she was captain, play-maker and Player of the Match in Antrim's defeat of Dublin.

== Career ==
She was among ten Antrim players who won the Gael Linn Cup for Ulster for the first time. She retired after Antrim were beaten by Cork in the 1973 All Ireland final, in which she scored a point. She played on the Deirdre teams defeated in the 1964 and 1965 All Ireland club finals.
