= All-Ireland Senior Club Camogie Championship 1966 =

Camogie championship

Winners
- Champions: St Patrick’s Glengoole (Tipperary) (2nd title)
- Captain: Ann Graham

Runners-up
- Runners-up: St Paul’s (Kilkenny)

The 1966 All-Ireland Senior Club Camogie Championship for the leading clubs in the women's team field sport of camogie was won by St Patrick’s Glengoole (from Tipperary, who defeated St Paul’s from Kilkenny in the final, played at St John's Park.

== Arrangements ==
The championship was organised on the traditional provincial system used in Gaelic Games since the 1880s, with Deirdre and Oranmore winning the championships of the other two provinces.

== The Final ==
Glengoole led by a point at half time, and won by 13 points as Anne Carroll scored a notable 2-3 of their total from the deep lying centre back position. Agnes Hourigan, president of the Camogie Association, wrote in the Irish Press:

There was little between the teams in the first half, once the Kilkenny girls had settled down, and the champions half time lead of 1-1 to 1-0 fairly reflected the even trend of the play. In the second half the power of the holders, who fielded nine of the Tipperary county team, told its tale and they had established a winning lead before Kilkenny cut the margin in a late rally.

=== Provincial stages ===
August 28
Connacht

Oranmore (Galway)	9-0 – 0-1	Balla (Mayo)

Oranmore

August 28
Leinster

St Paul’s (Kilkenny)	4-5 – 4-1	St Ibars (Wexford)

Kilkenny

August 28
Munster

St Patrick’s Glengoole (Tipperary)	5-16 – 1-2	Croagh (Limerick)

Adare

=== Final stages ===
September 1
Semi-Final

St Patrick’s Glengoole (Tipperary)	11-5 – 0-0	Deirdre (Antrim)

Holycross

September 8
Semi-Final

St Paul’s (Kilkenny)	5-3 – 2-0	Oranmore (Galway)

St John's Park

October 30
Final

St Patrick’s Glengoole (Tipperary)	5-5 – 2-1	St Paul’s (Kilkenny)

St John's Park

St Patrick’s Glengoole	St Paul’s

St Patrick’s Glengoole (Tipperary):
GK	1	Sally Long
FB	2	Ann Graham (captain)
RWB	3	Maura Maher
CB	4	Ann Carroll
LWB	5	Mary Graham
MF	6	Alica Long
MF	7	Katleen Griffin
MF	8	Monica Ryan
RWF	9	Brenie Moloney
CF	10	Lucy Scott
LWF	11	Margo Loughnane
FF	12	Peggy Graham

St Paul’s (Kilkenny):
GK	1	Teasie Brennan
FB	2	Nuala Duncan
RWB	3	Mary Holohan
CB	4	Anna Gargan
LWB	5	Mary Connery
MF	6	Carmel O'Shea
MF	7	Mary Fennelly
MF	8	Mary Butler
RWF	9	Claire O'Hanrahan
CF	10	Olivia O'Neill
LWF	11	Rose Vennard
FF	12	Nuala Grace

Preceded by All-Ireland Senior Club Camogie Championship 1965	All-Ireland Senior Club Camogie Championship; 1964 – present	Succeeded by All-Ireland Senior Club Camogie Championship 1967
