= Ruairí Óg GAC =

Antrim-based Gaelic games club

- Ruairí Óg CLG
- Founded: 1906
- County: Antrim
- Nickname: The Ógs, the Dall
- Colours: Maroon and white
- Grounds: Páirc Mhuire
- Coordinates: 55°04′37.94″N 6°03′28.73″W

Playing kits
Home Kit	GK Kit

Senior Club Championships
	All Ireland	Ulster champions	Antrim champions
Hurling:	0	12	15
Camogie:	-	-	2

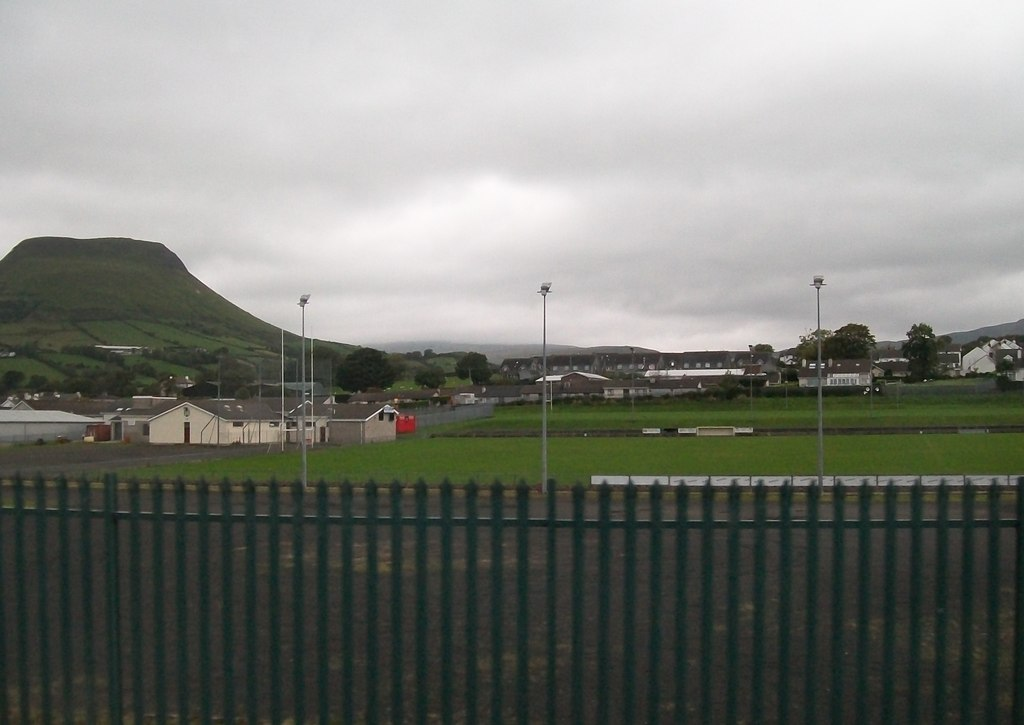
Páirc Mhuire, Cushendall

Ruairí Óg Gaelic Athletic Club, also known as Ruairí Óg and Cushendall, is a Gaelic Athletic Association club located in Cushendall, County Antrim, Northern Ireland. The club is almost exclusively concerned with the game of hurling.

The club was founded in 1906 and is named after Ruairí Óg Ó Mórdha (c. 1600 – 1655), who led the Catholic side in the Irish Rebellion of 1641.

In senior hurling Ruairí Óg compete annually in the Antrim Senior Club Hurling Championship, which they have won 14 times as of 2018. The club also competes in various other championships in all grades within Antrim.

== Honours ==
- All-Ireland Senior Club Hurling Championship Runner-Up 2016
- Ulster Senior Club Hurling Championship (12): 1981, 1985, 1987, 1991, 1992, 1996, 1999, 2006, 2008, 2015, 2018, 2023
- Antrim Senior Hurling Championship (16): 1981, 1985, 1987, 1991, 1992, 1993, 1996, 1999, 2005, 2006, 2008, 2014, 2015, 2018, 2023, 2024
- Antrim Intermediate Hurling Championship (1): 2004
- Antrim Junior Hurling Championship (2): 1976, 1979
- Antrim Under-21 Hurling Championship (3): 1999, 2014, 2016
- Antrim Minor Hurling Championship (8): 1963, 1993, 1997, 1998, 2005, 2006, 2010, 2013
- Antrim Senior Camogie Championship (2): 1986, 1995
