= Celtic Camogie Club =

Gaelic games club in County Dublin, Ireland

- Na Ceilteacha
- Founded: 1934
- County: Dublin
- Colours: Navy and red
- Grounds: Coolock
Standard
colours

Senior Club Championships
| | All Ireland | Leinster champions | Dublin champions |
|---|---|---|---|
| Camogie: | 1 | 2 | 11 |

Celtic is a camogie club, winner of the Dublin Championship on 12 occasions and the inaugural winner of the All-Ireland Senior Club Camogie Championship in 1964. Celtic's colours include a navy gym tunic with a red bar around the skirt and a white blouse.

== History ==
The Celtic Camogie Club was formed in the Coolock area of Dublin in 1929.

Celtic won 10 Dublin championships in the mid-20th century, and were the first All-Ireland club champions when the competition was introduced in 1964. In the final of the 1964 All-Ireland Senior Club Camogie Championship, Úna O'Connor scored three goals for Celtic. Also on the side were Angela Gill (daughter of Mick Gill who won All-Ireland hurling medals with Galway and Dublin), Mary Casey (a sister of Bill Casey who had won an All-Ireland football medal with Dublin in 1963) and Claire Heffernan (sister of Dublin footballer and later manager Kevin Heffernan).

== Notable players ==
Six presidents of the Camogie Association have been associated with the club. These include: Eilish Redmond, Mary Lynch, Nell McCarthy, Mary Moran, Mary Fennelly and Liz Howard.

Kathleen Duffy was named on the "Camogie Team of the Century", and Eileen Duffy (who played senior camogie with Dublin from 1949 until 1957) was also a club member.
