= All-Ireland Senior Club Camogie Championship 1981 =

Camogie championship

Winners
- Champions: Buffers Alley (Wexford) (2nd title)
- Captain: Ann Butler

Runners-up
- Runners-up: Killeagh (Cork

The 1981 All-Ireland Senior Club Camogie Championship for the leading clubs in the women's team field sport of camogie was won by Buffers Alley from Wexford, who defeated Killeagh from Cork in the final, played at Gaultier . It was the first leg of a record four in a row won by the club.

== Arrangements ==
The championship was organised on the traditional provincial system used in Gaelic Games since the 1880s, with Oranmore and Kilkeel winning the championships of the other two provinces. Margaret Leacy who had missed the previous season returned to the Buffers Alley team and her presence was a factor in their reversing the result in the 1980 final.

== The Final ==
Buffers Alley went five points up in the first ten minutes of the final and won by five.

=== Final stages ===
September 1
Semi-Final

Buffers Alley (Wx)	6-12 – 2-4	Oranmore

September 8
Semi-Final

Killeagh (Cork)	4-6 – 0-3	Kilkeel

Russell Park

November 8
Final

Buffers Alley (Wx)	2-6 – 1-4	Killeagh (Cork)

Gaultier

Buffers Alley	Killeagh (Cork)

Buffers Alley (Wx):
GK	1	Terri Butler
FB	2	Ann Butler (captain)
RWB	3	Geraldine Duggan
CB	4	Margaret Leacy
LWB	5	Deirdre Cousins
MF	6	Fiona Cousins
MF	7	Stellah Sinnott
MF	8	Elsie Walsh
RWF	9	Gertrude O'Leary
CF	10	Caroline O'Leary
LWF	11	Dorothy Walsh
FF	12	Bridie Doran

Killeagh (Cork):
GK	1	Patricia Fitzgibbon
FB	2	Marie O'Donovan
RWB	3	Mary Spillane
CB	4	Cathy Landers
LWB	5	Barbara Kirby
MF	6	Pat Lenihan
MF	7	Ann Marie Landers
MF	8	Fidelma O'Connor
RWF	9	Patsy Keniry
CF	10	Marion Sweeney
LWF	11	Betty Joyce
FF	12	Bridie Doran

Preceded by All-Ireland Senior Club Camogie Championship 1980	All-Ireland Senior Club Camogie Championship; 1964 – present	Succeeded by All-Ireland Senior Club Camogie Championship 1982
