= All-Ireland Senior Club Camogie Championship 1980 =

Camogie championship

Winners
- Champions: Killeagh (Cork) (1st title)
- Captain: Breda Landers

Runners-up
- Runners-up: Buffers Alley (Wx)

The 1980 All-Ireland Senior Club Camogie Championship for the leading clubs in the women's team field sport of camogie was won by Killeagh (Cork), who defeated Buffers Alley (Wx) in the final, played at St John’s Park.

== Arrangements ==
The championship was organised on the traditional provincial system used in Gaelic Games since the 1880s, with Oranmore and Kilkeel winning the championships of the other two provinces.

== The Final ==
In the final, Killeagh built up a comfortable lead in the first half and had the speed and stamina to hold on through the second half. Buffers Alley set the pace with a fine point from Elsie Walsh, but a goal for Killeagh in the fifth minute which was against the run of play put the Cork team into a lead which they never relinquished. Although the Buffers Alley midfield did well, the forwards failed to use their chances. A goal by Killeagh's Betty Joyce in the 10th minute increased the Cork lead and, although Elsie Walsh continued to pick off points for Buffers Alley, the Wexford team remained in arrears and were trailing by five points at the interval. A Bridie Doran goal just after the restart brought Buffers Alley back into contention and a point from Elsie Walsh a minute later narrowed the deficit to a point. Then the Killeagh team, best served by Betty Joyce, Marie O'Donovan and Pat Moloney, kept up the pressure and added a further goal and a point to their score. Terry Butler did well in the Wexford goal.

=== Final stages ===
September 1
Semi-Final

Killeagh (Cork)	4-8 – 2-1	Oranmore

Ballyagran

September 8
Semi-Final

Buffers Alley (Wx)	2-8 – 0-3	Kilkeel

Russell Park

November 9
Final

Killeagh (Cork)	4-2 – 1-7	Buffers Alley (Wx)

St John’s Park

Killeagh	Buffers Alley

Killeagh (Cork):
GK	1	Patricia Fitzgibbon
FB	2	Marie Costine
RWB	3	Mary Spillane
CB	4	Breda Landers (captain)
LWB	5	Cathy Landers
MF	6	Ann Marie Landers
MF	7	Pat Moloney
MF	8	Barbara Kirby
RWF	9	Betty Joyce
CF	10	Patsy Keniry
LWF	11	Anne Leahy
FF	12	Marion Sweeney

Buffers Alley (Wx):
GK	1	Kathleen Tonks
FB	2	Ann Butler
RWB	3	Geraldine Duggan
CB	4	Dorothy Walsh
LWB	5	Deirdre Cousins
MF	6	Fiona Cousins
MF	7	Caroline O'Leary
MF	8	A. Martin
RWF	9	Elsie Walsh
CF	10	Teresa Hobbs
LWF	11	Mairéad Carty
FF	12	Marion Sweeney

Preceded by All-Ireland Senior Club Camogie Championship 1979	All-Ireland Senior Club Camogie Championship; 1964 – present	Succeeded by All-Ireland Senior Club Camogie Championship 1981
