= All-Ireland Senior Club Camogie Championship 2009 =

Camogie championship

Winners
- Champions: Cashel (Tipperary) (2nd title)
- Captain: Una O'Dwyer

Runners-up
- Runners-up: Athenry (Gal)

The 2009 All-Ireland Senior Club Camogie Championship for the leading clubs in the women's team field sport of camogie was won by Cashel from Tipperary, who defeated Athenry from Galway in the final, played at Clarecastle.

== Arrangements ==
The championship was organised on the traditional provincial system used in Gaelic games since the 1880s, with Oulart the Ballagh (Wexford) and Loughgiel Shamrocks (Antrim) winning the championships of the other two provinces.

== Final ==
The final was played in high winds and torrential rain, Cashel holding on to win by two points despite the arrival of Jessica Gill on the Athenry team after being sidelined since September with cruciate ligament damage.

=== Final stages ===
September 1
Semi-Final

Cashel (Tipperary)	1-14 – 2-7	Oulart–The Ballagh (Wexford)

Oulart–The Ballagh

September 8
Semi-Final

Athenry (Gal)	1-15 – 0-3	Loughgiel Shamrocks (Antrim)

Ballinasloe

December 6
Final

Cashel (Tipperary)	0-11 – 0-9	Athenry (Gal)

Clarecastle

Cashel	Athenry

Cashel (Tipperary):
GK	1	Helen Breen
RCB	2	Claire Ryan
FB	3	Una O’Dwyer (captain)
LCB	4	Noelette Dwyer
RWB	5	Paula Bulfin
CB	6	Philly Fogarty
LWB	7	Julie McGrath
MF	8	Jill Horan
MF	9	Linda Grogan
RWF	10	Cora Hennessy
CF	11	Mairéad Morrissey
LWF	12	Clare Grogan
RCF	13	Alison Lonergan
FF	14	Emily Hayden
LCF	15	Cliona Dwyer

Athenry (Gal):
GK	1	Stephanie Gannon
RCB	2	Katherine Glynn
FB	3	Alice Poniard
LCB	4	Darelle Coen
RWB	5	Ciara Cunniffe
CB	6	Regina Glynn
LWB	7	Krystle Ruddy
MF	8	Sarah Donohue
MF	9	Laura Linnane
RWF	10	Natalie Jordan
CF	11	Therese Maher
LWF	12	Noreen Coen
RCF	13	Brenda Kerins
FF	14	Katie O'Dwyer
LCF	15	Mary Keogh

Preceded by All-Ireland Senior Club Camogie Championship 2008	All-Ireland Senior Club Camogie Championship; 1964 – present	Succeeded by All-Ireland Senior Club Camogie Championship 2010
