= Ray Kelly (referee) =

Hurling referee

- Occupation: Referee

Ray Kelly is an Irish referee who officiated several All-Ireland Senior Camogie Championship finals.

He received praise for his refereeing in the 2019 All-Ireland camogie final.

He is from the St Kevin's GAA club in County Kildare.
