= Cashel King Cormacs GAA =

Irish Gaelic Athletic Association club

Cashel King Cormacs
- Caiseal Rí Cormaic
- County: Tipperary
- Nickname: The Kings
- Colours: Red and Green
- Grounds: Leahy Park
- Coordinates: 52°30′35.44″N 7°52′37.18″W

Playing kits
Standard colours

Senior Club Championships
	All Ireland	Munster champions	Tipperary champions
Hurling:	-	1	1
Camogie:	2	6	?

Cashel King Cormacs GAA is a Gaelic Athletic Association club located in the town of Cashel, County Tipperary in Ireland. They play their games in Leahy Park, on the Clonmel Road in Cashel. The club is a part of West Tipperary GAA. The club is named for the king-bishop Cormac Mac Cárthaigh (d. 1138).

Extensive work has been carried out in the last few years, with the addition of a new clubhouse and main stand the highlight. Notable games have been held here in the last few years and it has become the annual venue for both the County Senior Club Football Final and the Munster Colleges Senior Hurling Dr.Harty Cup Final.

== Camogie ==
Cashel Camogie club won the All-Ireland Senior Club Camogie Championship in 2007 and 2009. They won further Munster senior club championships in 2001, 2002, 2005 and 2006. The sport was revived in 1971 after a team emerged from the Presentation Convent by Willie Prendergast, Sr Mary Brennan and Sr Maureen McGrath. The school had a number of successful years, and won several Munster and All-Ireland colleges' titles.

== Honours ==
=== Hurling ===
- Munster Senior Club Hurling Championship: 1
  - 1991
- Tipperary Senior Hurling Championship: 1
  - 1991
- West Tipperary Senior Hurling Championship: 18
  - 1934, 1936, 1937, 1939, 1940, 1945, 1948, 1965, 1971, 1975, 1976, 1980, 1988, 1990, 1991, 1993, 1994, 1995
- Tipperary Premier Intermediate Hurling Championship:1
- 2024
- West Tipperary Intermediate Hurling Championship: (1)
  - 2015
- Tipperary Junior A Hurling Championship: (1)
  - 1991
- West Tipperary Junior A Hurling Championship: (5)
  - 1933, 1953, 1984, 1986, 1991, 1994
- West Tipperary Junior B Hurling Championship: (5)
  - 1993, 1995, 2003, 2008, 2016
- Tipperary Under-21 Hurling Championship: (1)
  - 1991
- West Tipperary Under-21 A Hurling Championship: (7)
  - 1961, 1964, 1976, 1983, 1990, 1991, 1992
- West Tipperary Under-21 B Hurling Championship: (3)
  - 2010, 2011, 2016
- Tipperary Minor A Hurling Championship: (5)
  - 1974, 1975, 1980, 1988, 1989
- West Minor A Hurling Championship: (21)
  - 1931, 1940, 1949, 1952, 1956, 1959, 1960, 1961, 1964, 1972, 1973, 1974, 1975, 1976, 1980, 1987, 1988, 1989, 1992, 2000, 2012
- Tipperary Minor B Hurling Championship: (1)
  - 2016
- West Tipperary Minor B Hurling Championship: (1)
  - 2016

=== Football ===
- West Tipperary Senior Football Championship: 1
  - 1992
- Tipperary Under-21 Football Championship: (1)
  - 1990
- West Tipperary Under-21 Football Championship: (3)
  - 1977, 1980, 1990
- West Tipperary Under-21 B Football Championship: (1)
  - 2012
- Tipperary Intermediate Football Championship: 1
  - 1976
- West Tipperary Intermediate Football Championship: (3)
  - 1976, 2006, 2012
- Tipperary Junior Football Championship: (2)
  - 1976, 1984
- West Tipperary Junior Football Championship: (2)
  - 1982, 1984
- Mid Tipperary Junior Football Championship (2)
  - 1924, 1925
- Tipperary Junior Football B Championship:
  - 2017
- West Tipperary Junior B Football Championship: (2)
  - 2012, 2017
- Tipperary Minor A Football Championship: (1)
  - 1974
- West Tipperary Minor A Football Championship: (6)
  - 1965, 1973, 1974, 1976, 1989, 2000
- Tipperary Minor B Football Championship: (1)
  - 2016
- West Tipperary Minor B Football Championship: (2)
  - 2008, 2016

=== Camogie ===
- All-Ireland Senior Club Camogie Championship: 2
  - 2007, 2009
- Munster Senior Club Camogie Championship: 6
  - 2001, 2002, 2005, 2006, 2007, 2009

== Notable players ==
- Colm Bonnar
- Conal Bonnar
- Cormac Bonnar
- Dylan Fitzell
- Pat Fitzelle
- Ryan O'Dwyer
- Eoghan Connolly
- Oisín O'Donoghue
