= Úna O'Connor (camogie) =

Irish sportsperson (1938–2020)

Personal information
- Native name: Úna Ní Conchobhair (Irish)
- Born: 1938 Fairview, Dublin, Ireland
- Died: 4 March 2020 (aged 83)

Sport
- Sport: Camogie
- Position: Full back, full forward
Club
- Years: Club
- Celtic
Club titles
- Dublin titles: 10
Inter-county
- Years: County
- 1953–1967: Dublin
Inter-county titles
- All-Irelands: 13

Úna O'Connor (1938 – 4 March 2020) was an Irish sportsperson who played senior camogie with Dublin from 1953 until 1975. She is regarded as one of the greatest players of all time, a member of the team of the century, the first camogie player to win a Caltex award in 1966, and the Gaelic Weekly all-star award winner in 1967.

== Early life ==
Úna O'Connor was born in Fairview, Dublin in 1938. The youngest of eight children, her mother died when she was eighteen years old. O'Connor grew up in Dublin at a time when the county's Gaelic footballers were successful. She was a great admirer of Kevin Heffernan and often received coaching advice from him before she played in big games.

== Playing career ==
=== Club ===
O'Connor played her club camogie with the Celtic club in Dublin. She had several successes with Celtic, winning ten Dublin county camogie championship titles in all. She was also one of the key players when the club won the first All-Ireland Club Camogie Championship in 1964.

=== Inter-county ===
In 1953 O'Connor won her first All-Ireland medal with Dublin. Although she was only fifteen years old, she showed exceptional talent by scoring three goals in the defeat of Tipperary. After that, O’Connor collected two additional All-Ireland medals in 1954 and 1955.

In 1957 Dublin reached the All-Ireland final once again. However, O’Connor was out of favour with the management and was not in the starting line-up for the game. With Dublin struggling with ten minutes left in the game, O’Connor was brought on and showed her talent once again by scoring the winning goal. Although she was only 19, she had just won her fourth All-Ireland medal. This victory began an amazing run of success that by 1966 saw O’Connor win ten All-Ireland medals in a row. This achievement is unique to O’Connor and one that is unlikely to be ever equalled. In 1963 and 1964 she had the honour of captaining her native county to back-to-back victories.

In 1967 O’Connor appeared in another All-Ireland final. However, Antrim gained revenge on Dublin by beating them in the All-Ireland final replay. In spite of this, she received the Caltex Award for best player of the year, thus becoming the first camogie player to be so honoured. In 1975 O’Connor came out of retirement to play in the Leinster championship against Wexford. Once again she showed her versatility by playing as a full-back, while she previously played as a forward.

== Retirement ==
In retirement, O'Connor's reputation as one of the greatest players of all time has grown. Her haul of thirteen All-Ireland medals is a record that stands second to her county colleague Kathleen Mills, who heads the honours list with fifteen medals. In 2004 O’Connor was named in the wing-forward position on a special team picked to celebrate the centenary of Cumann Camogaíochta na nGael.

== Camogie Honours ==
Dublin

- All-Ireland Senior Camogie Championship
  - Winners: (13) 1953, 1954, 1955, 1957, 1958, 1959, 1960, 1961, 1962, 1963 (c), 1964 (c), 1965, 1966
  - Runners-Up: (1) 1967
- Leinster Senior Camogie Championship
  - Winners: (15) 1953, 1954, 1955, 1956, 1957, 1958, 1959, 1960, 1961, 1962, 1963, 1964, 1965, 1966, 1967

Celtic Camogie Club, Dublin

- All-Ireland Senior Club Camogie Championship
  - Winners: (1) 1964

Preceded by Gerry Hughes (Dublin)	All-Ireland Camogie Final winning captain 1963	Succeeded by retained
Preceded by incumbent	All-Ireland Camogie Final winning captain 1964	Succeeded by Kay Ryder (Dublin)
