= Barney McAuley =

Irish hurler

Personal information
- Native name: Barnaí Mag Amhalaí (Irish)
- Born: 1982 (age 43–44) Loughguile, County Antrim, Northern Ireland
- Occupation: fitter
- Height: 5 ft 11 in (180 cm)

Sport
- Sport: Hurling
- Position: midfield
Club
- Years: Club
- Loughgiel Shamrocks
Club titles
- Antrim titles: 5
- Ulster titles: 4
- All-Ireland Titles: 1
Inter-county
- Years: County
- 2003-2015: Antrim
Inter-county titles
- Ulster titles: 1
- All-Irelands: 0
- NHL: 0
- All Stars: 0

Barney McAuley (born 1982) is an Irish hurler who played as a right corner-back and midfield for the Antrim senior team.

McAuley made his first appearance for the team during the 2003 National League and was a regular member of the starting fifteen until his retirement after the 2013championship. During that time he won one Christy Ring Cup winners' medal and fourUlster winners' medal.he also played for Fermanagh and won a lory meagher in 2021

At club level McAuley is an All-Ireland medalist with Loughgiel Shamrocks. In addition to this he has also won back-to-back Ulster and county club championship winners' medals.
