= All-Ireland Senior Club Camogie Championship 2007 =

Camogie championship

Winners
- Champions: Cashel (Tipperary) (1st title)
- Captain: Sinéad Millea

Runners-up
- Runners-up: Athenry (Gal)
- Manager: Midge Poniard

The 2007 All-Ireland Senior Club Camogie Championship for the leading clubs in the women's team field sport of camogie was won by Cashel (Tip), who defeated Athenry (Gal) in the final, played at Limerick. Clare Grogan scored 2–5 for Cashel in their semi-final victory over Rossa, while teenager Jessica Gill scored 2–6 for Athenry against four-in-a-row seeking Freshford in their semi-final, for whom two late goals by Ann Dalton cut the deficit.

== Arrangements ==
The championship was organised on the traditional provincial system used in Gaelic Games since the 1880s, with O’Donovan Rossa (Antrim) and St Lachtain’s, Freshford, (Kilkenny) winning the championships of the other two provinces.

== Final ==
Philly Fogarty and Jill Horan dominated midfield, enabling Cashel to claim the title.

=== Final stages ===
November 3
Semi-Final

Cashel (Tipperary)	2-13 – 2-3	O’Donovan Rossa

Páirc Esler

November 4
Semi-Final

Athenry (Gal)	3-11 – 3-6	St Lachtain’s, Freshford

Ballinasloe

November 18
Final

Cashel (Tipperary)	1-18 – 0-8	Athenry (Gal)

Limerick

Cashel	Athenry

Cashel (Tipperary):
GK	1	Helen Breen
RCB	2	Sarah Morrissey
FB	3	Noelette O'Dwyer
LCB	4	Julie McGrath
RWB	5	Paula Bulfin
CB	6	Una O'Dwyer
LWB	7	Sinéad Millea (captain)
MF	8	Philly Fogarty
MF	9	Jill Horan
RWF	10	Linda Grogan
CF	11	Mairéad Morrissey
LWF	12	Cora Hennessy
RCF	13	Alison Lonergan
FF	14	Emily Hayden
LCF	15	Clare Grogan

Athenry (Gal):
GK	1	Stephanie Gannon
RCB	2	Katherine Glynn
FB	3	Alice Poniard
LCB	4	Darelle Coen
RWB	5	Regina Glynn
CB	6	Krystel Ruddy
LWB	7	Emma Costello
MF	8	Sarah Donohue
MF	9	Laura Linnane
RWF	10	Jessica Gill
CF	11	Therese Maher
LWF	12	Sharon Quirke
RCF	13	Mary Keogh
FF	14	Nicola Nally
LCF	15	Noreen Ruddy

Preceded by All-Ireland Senior Club Camogie Championship 2006	All-Ireland Senior Club Camogie Championship; 1964 – present	Succeeded by All-Ireland Senior Club Camogie Championship 2008
