= Creggan =

Creggan may refer to several places:

== Places ==
=== Northern Ireland ===
- Creggan, County Antrim, a small village and townland in County Antrim, Northern Ireland
  - Kickhams Creggan GAC, a Gaelic sports club in County Antrim
- Creggan, County Armagh, Northern Ireland, a small village
  - Creggan River, County Armagh, part of the Castletown River which flows through Dundalk
- Creggan, County Tyrone, a townland in Northern Ireland
- Creggan, Derry, a large housing estate in Derry, Northern Ireland

=== Republic of Ireland ===
- Creggan, County Westmeath, a townland in Noughaval civil parish, barony of Kilkenny West, County Westmeath

== See also ==
- Cregan
