= Michelle Kennedy =

American author(born 1972)

- Born: Michelle Louise Kennedy; July 12, 1972 (age 54); Baltimore, Maryland
- Occupations: Author; essayist; novelist
- Writing career
- Genres: Non-fiction, Humor, Memoir
- Notable awards: Pushcart Prize nominee
- Website: www.mishkennedy.com

Michelle Kennedy (née Michelle Louise Kennedy, July 12, 1972) is an American author and humorist.

== Biography ==
Kennedy was born in Baltimore, Maryland, but spent most of her life on a small sheep farm in Chelsea, Vermont. She played high school basketball and loved doing farm chores. She was head page in the United States Senate her junior year in high school for Senator Patrick Leahy. She is the mother of eight children.

Kennedy's formal writing career began as a reporter for the Green Bay News-Chronicle. Since then, she has published work in Salon.com, The New York Times, The Christian Science Monitor, Redbook, Family Circle and many other publications. She has also read her work on National Public Radio.

Kennedy is the author of 16 books. Her first book, Without a Net: Middle Class and Homeless (With Kids) in America, was published by Viking in 2005 and received many positive critical reviews as well as several awards.

== Books ==
- The Last Straw Strategies (Series of 8 books), Barrons Educational Series, 2003
- It Worked For Me: 1,001 Real-Life Pregnancy Tips, 2004
- Without a Net: Middle Class and Homeless (With Kids) in America, (ISBN 978-0143036784) Viking, 2005
- The Big Book of Happy, Metro Books, 2007
- A Fine Mess: Living Simply With Children, 2008
- Year of the Dog: How Running Sled Dogs Saved the Life of a Woefully Average, Middle-Aged Mother of Eight, (ISBN 978-1493517367) In a Shoe Press, 2013
