= Mary Moran (camogie) =

Camogie player and coach

- Máire Ní Mhóráin

18th President of the Camogie Association
- In office 1979–1982
- Succeeded by: Mary Fennelly

Mary Moran, Irish: Máire Ní Mhóráin, was the 18th president of the Camogie Association, elected at the 1973 Congress in the Blarney Hotel in a run-off against Mary Lynch of Monaghan.

== Family and early life ==
A native of Limerick city, she is the daughter of John and Frances Moran, fourth of a family of six. When she moved to Cork at the age of 11, she attended St Aloysius School (a camogie nursery in those days) and was introduced to game for the first time.

== Camogie ==
Moran won Cork Colleges senior and junior championship medals with St Aloysius and played with Cork colleges against Dublin. She played Ashbourne Cup with UCC, and won Cork senior and junior championship medals with Old Aloysius Camogie Club, Aloysians (confined to past and present pupils of St Aloysius School). On being appointed to AIB, Enniscorthy she played with Kilcarry and won a Carlow County Championship medal. On being appointed to AIB, Dame St, she joined Dublin camogie side Celtic, winning Dublin senior league and championship medals.

Moran won an All Ireland medal and Munster senior championship medals for her adopted county of Cork, When as she says "unfortunately, Old Als went the way of all past pupil clubs" she joined St Finbarr’s as she wished to remain an affiliated member of the Camogie Association and became secretary of the club.

== Coaching ==
She trained Cork to two All Ireland titles 1972 and 1973, an All Ireland Junior (two in the same afternoon), and two All Ireland Minor in 1975 and 1976. She became the first national camogie coach in 1976. With Ann Carroll in 1978 she wrote the first camogie coaching book Camogie and followed with a second one, The Coach in Action.

== Administration ==
She chaired Cork County Camogie Board for ten years, 1968–77, and was President of Cork Camogie Board President of Cork County Board for five years, 1993–97. She was chairman of Munster Camogie Council for five years, 2002–06, secretary of Munster Colleges Council and secretary of All-Ireland Colleges Council for 32 years, 1969–2001, and trustee of the Camogie Association, 2006–2010.

== Presidency ==
Moran was elected president in 1979. That year the 75th Anniversary of camogie's existence was marked by a banquet and the first Junior League final, an Idir-Ghaeltacht Competition which was won by Kildare. In 1980 the first full-time camogie Ardstiúrthóir. Jo Golden, was appointed with a central office provided in Croke Park.

== Writing ==
She has written Camogie Champions (1997), Gymfrocks and Headbands (1997) (a history of Munster Colleges), A Resounding Success (1998) (a history of All-Ireland Colleges), Cork's Camogie Story (2000) and Munster's Camogie Story (2004). A Game of Our Own: The History of Camogie, her book on the sport as played nationally, was published in 2011.
