= 1895 Limerick Senior Hurling Championship =

Annual hurling competition season

- Champions: St. Michael's (1st title)
- Runners-up: Boher

The 1895 Limerick Senior Hurling Championship was the seventh staging of the Limerick Senior Hurling Championship since its establishment by the Limerick County Board in 1887.

Bruree were the defending champions.

St. Michael's won the championship after a 2–03 to 0–01 defeat of Boher in the final. It was their only championship title.

== Results ==
=== Final ===
Final	St. Michael's	2–03 – 0–01	Boher
