= Stephanie Dunlea =

Irish camogie player

Personal information
- Native name: Stíofáinín Ní Dhúnliath (Irish)
- Born: County Cork, Ireland

Sport
- Sport: Camogie
- Position: corner-back
- Position: corner-back
Club
- Years: Club
- Glen Rovers
Inter-county
- Years: County
- Cork
Inter-county titles
- All-Irelands: 6
- All Stars: 1

Stephanie Dunlea is a camogie player from County Cork in Ireland. She won All Ireland medals with Cork in 2002 and 2005. In addition to winning a Lynchpin award (predecessor of the All Star awards) in 2003, she was nominated for the All-Star shortlist in 2004 and 2005.

Her grand-aunt Kate Dunlea captained Cork to the 1933 title, and her father John won an All-Ireland Junior Football Championship medal in 1964. Her sister Lynn Dunlea won five All Ireland medals and acted as camogie match analyst on RTÉ's Sunday Sport.
