= Jane Adams (camogie) =

Irish camogie player

Personal information
- Native name: Síne Níc Ádhaimh (Irish)
- Born: Antrim, Northern Ireland

Sport
- Sport: Camogie
- Position: Centre field
Club*
Years	Club	Apps (scores)
	O'Donovan Rossa	?
Club titles
- Ulster titles: 4
Inter-county**
Years	County	Apps (scores)
	Antrim	?
Inter-county titles
- All Stars: 1
- * club appearances and scores correct as of (16:31, 30 June 2010 (UTC)). **Inter County team apps and scores correct as of (16:31, 30 June 2010 (UTC)).

Jane Adams is an Irish camogie player, winner of an All-Star award in 2008, a Lynchpin award, predecessor of the All Star awards, in 2003. and an Intermediate Soaring Star award in 2011. She was Ulster camogie player of the year three times. She captained Antrim to the All-Ireland Junior Camogie Championship in 2010.

== Career ==
From Upper Dunmurry Lane in Belfast, she played for St Malachy’s at primary school level and attended St Louise's before joining the O'Donovan Rossa club. She won her first Junior All-Ireland medal in 1997 when Antrim defeated Cork in the All-Ireland final. She was Player of the match in the 2001 All-Ireland Intermediate final and won a second intermediate medal in 2003.

== All Ireland Club Championship ==
She won four Ulster Championships and one All-Ireland Title with Rossa, winning prominence as captain, play-maker and scorer of two goals and nine points as O'Donovan Rossa became the first Ulster club to win the All Ireland Club Championship in 2008. She had previously scored 2-11 in the semi-final against Ballyboden St Enda's.
