= Ballingarry GAA =

Gaelic sports club in County Tipperary, Ireland

Ballingarry
- Baile an Gharraí
- County: Tipperary
- Colours: Maroon and White
- Grounds: Ballingarry
- Coordinates: 52°35′11.03″N 7°32′36.58″W

Playing kits
Standard colours

Ballingarry GAA club is a Gaelic Athletic Association club located in Ballingarry, south County Tipperary, Ireland. The club plays hurling in South Tipperary and Tipperary GAA competitions.

== History ==
=== Honours ===
- Junior B All Ireland Club Hurling Championship (1)
  - 2007
- Tipperary Intermediate Hurling Championship (1)
  - 1979
- South Tipperary Senior Hurling Championship (8)
  - 1949, 1980, 1987, 1992, 1994, 1996, 1998, 2001
- South Tipperary Intermediate Hurling Championship (4)
  - 1971, 1973, 1977, 1979, 2021
- Tipperary Junior A Hurling Championship (1)
  - 1973
- South Tipperary Junior Hurling Championship (8)
  - 1935, 1939, 1944, 1947, 1966, 1970, 1986, 2008
- Tipperary Junior Football Championship (1)
  - 1939
- South Tipperary Junior Football Championship (8)
  - 1939, 1945, 1947, 1996, 2013, 2014, 2015, 2022
- Tipperary Junior B Hurling Championship (1)
  - 2007
- South Tipperary Junior B Hurling Championship (1)
  - 2007
- South Tipperary Under-21 'A' Hurling Championship (11)
  - 1970, 1975, 1981, 1990, 1991, 1997 (as Ballingarry Gaels), 1998 (as Ballingarry Gaels), 2010, 2011, 2019, 2025
- County Tipperary Minor Hurling Championship (2)
  - 1994, 1995 (both as Ballingarry Gaels)
- South Tipperary Minor Hurling Championship (14)
  - 1938, 1960 (with Mullinahone), 1962 (with Mullinahone), 1963 (with Mullinahone),1972, 1978, 1979, 1994 (as Ballingarry Gaels), 1995 (as Ballingarry Gaels), 1997, 1998 (as Ballingarry Gaels), 2006, 2007, 2008
- Tipperary Minor B Hurling Championship (1)
  - 1992
- South Tipperary Minor Hurling Championship (2)
  - 1992, 2014

=== Notable players ===
- Liam Cahill

== Camogie ==
St Patrick's Camogie Club was founded in 1964 when Ballingarry and Glengoole amalgamated. They went on to win two All-Ireland and three county championships and supplied six of the 12 players on the Tipperary team for the 1965 All-Ireland final.

Alice Graham, Statia Dunne, Annie Langton and Ann Carroll were the first officers of the club. Following victory in 1966, the club disbanded and the players returned to their original clubs.

=== Honours ===
- All-Ireland Senior Club Camogie Championship (2)
  - 1965, 1966
- Tipperary Senior Camogie Championship (3)
  - 1964, 1965, 1966

=== Notable players ===
- Ann Carroll, Tipperary, Kilkenny, Munster and Leinster player
