= Ulster Senior Club Camogie Championship =

Camogie competition in Ireland

- Irish: Craobh Club Chamógaíochta Uladh
- Code: Camogie
- Founded: 1964; 62 years ago
- Region: Ulster (GAA)
- Title holders: Dunloy (3rd title)
- Most titles: Loughgiel; Portglenone (8 titles)

The Ulster Senior Club Camogie Championship is an annual camogie competition that is organised by the Ulster Council of the Camogie Association and contested by the champion senior clubs in the province of Ulster in Ireland. It is the most prestigious club competition in Ulster camogie.

== Competition ==
The winner of the Ulster championship contests the semi-final of the All-Ireland Senior Club Camogie Championship. The championship was first contested in 1964.

Dunloy are the reigning champions, having beaten Clonduff in the 2026 final.

== Roll of honour ==
#	Club	County	Titles	Years won
1	Portglenone	Antrim	8	1971, 1972, 1974, 1977, 1978, 1979, 1982, 1992
2	Loughgiel	Antrim	8	1993, 1997, 2014, 2015, 2022, 2023, 2024, 2025
3	Slaughtneil	Derry	6	2016, 2017, 2018, 2019, 2020, 2021
4	O'Donovan Rossa	Antrim	5	2004, 2005, 2006, 2007, 2012
4	Swatragh	Derry	5	1983, 1988, 1989, 1990, 2000
4	Liatroim Fontenoys	Down	5	1984, 1995, 1996, 1998, 1999
4	Deirdre	Antrim	5	1964, 1965, 1966, 1967, 1968
8	Eglish	Tyrone	4	1985, 1986, 1987, 1991
9	Dunloy	Antrim	3	1994, 2003, 2026
10	Keady	Armagh	2	2001, 2002
10	Kilkeel	Down	2	1980, 1981
10	Creggan	Antrim	2	1973, 1976
13	Eoghan Rua	Derry	1	2013
13	Newry	Down	1	1975
13	Bellaghy	Derry	1	1970
13	Ahoghill	Antrim	1	1969

=== By county ===
County	Titles	Runners-up	Total
Antrim	32	13	45
Derry	13	20	33
Down	8	8	16
Tyrone	4	7	11
Armagh	2	4	6
Monaghan	0	5	5
Cavan	0	2	2

All-Ireland winners
All-Ireland finalists

== Finals Listed By Year ==
Year	Winner	County	Score	Opponent	County	Score	Venue	Captain
2026	Dunloy	Antrim	1-10	Clonduff	Down	0-11	Stewartstown, Tyrone	Katie Laverty
2025	Loughgiel	Antrim	2-15	Clonduff	Down	1-11	Athletic Grounds, Armagh	Amy Boyle
2024	Loughgiel	Antrim	3-16	Swatragh	Derry	0-05	Beragh	Christine McCloskey
2023	Loughgiel	Antrim	0-20	Liatroim Fontenoys	Down	0-03	Athletic Grounds, Armagh	Una McNaughton/Christine Laverty
2022	Loughgiel	Antrim	2-13	Slaughtneil	Derry	1-11	Newry	Amy Boyle/Lucia McNaughton
2021	Slaughtneil	Derry	3-07	Loughgiel	Antrim	0-09	Lavey	Shannon Graham & Jolene Bradley
2020	Slaughtneil	Derry	1-12 (Replay); 0-09	Loughgiel	Antrim	0-08 (Replay); 0-09	Glen, Maghera	Tina Bradley/ Louise Dougan
2019	Slaughtneil	Derry	2-08	Loughgiel	Antrim	1-07	Ballymena	Gráinne Ní Chatháin /Siobhan Bradley
2018	Slaughtneil	Derry	0-11	Loughgiel	Antrim	0-08	O'Neill Park, Dungannon	Gráinne O’Kane & Siobhán McKeague
2017	Slaughtneil	Derry	2-11	Loughgiel	Antrim	3-05	Athletic Grounds, Armagh	Aoife Ní Chaiside & Clare McGrath
2016	Slaughtneil	Derry	1-08 (Replay); 1-08	Loughgiel	Antrim	1-05 (Replay); 1-08	Athletic Grounds, Armagh	Aoife Ní Chaiside
2015	Loughgiel	Antrim	1-14	Slaughtneil	Derry	1-09	Owenbeg	Úna McNaughton
2014	Loughgiel	Antrim	0-11	Eoghan Rua	Derry	1-07	Owenbeg	Emma McMullan
2013	Eoghan Rua	Derry	4-10	O'Donovan Rossa	Antrim	0-03	Owenbeg	Méabh McGoldrick
2012	O'Donovan Rossa	Antrim	5-8	Slaughtneil	Derry	1-4	Athletic Grounds, Armagh	Mairin Quinn
2011	Uncontested. Antrim champions represented Ulster in the All-Ireland series.							
2010	Uncontested. Antrim champions represented Ulster in the All-Ireland series.							
2009	Uncontested. Antrim champions represented Ulster in the All-Ireland series.							
2008	Uncontested. Antrim champions represented Ulster in the All-Ireland series.							
2007	O'Donovan Rossa	Antrim	3-18	Lavey	Derry	1-5	Bellaghy	Jane Adams
2006	O'Donovan Rossa	Antrim	5-13	Castledawson	Derry	2-5	Keady	Jane Adams
2005	O'Donovan Rossa	Antrim	1-13	Swatragh	Derry	0-8		Ciara McGinley
2004	O'Donovan Rossa	Antrim	Win (Replay); 1-05	Lavey	Derry	Loss (Replay); 1-05	Ballymacnab	Ciara McGinley
2003	Dunloy	Antrim	0-13	Swatragh	Derry	2-3	Loughgiel	Majella Connolly
2002	Keady	Armagh	3-7	O'Donovan Rossa	Antrim	1-10		Eileen McGrory
2001	Keady	Armagh	3-06	Swatragh	Derry	1-09	Rossa Park, Belfast	Helena Murray
2000	Swatragh	Derry	0-13	Keady	Armagh	2-06		Aileen Tohill
1999	Liatroim Fontenoys	Down	2-09	Crosserlough	Cavan	3-02	Castleblayney	Nula Magee
1998	Liatroim Fontenoys	Down	4-14	Dunloy	Antrim	1-12	Dunloy	Majella Murray
1997	Loughgiel	Antrim	6-11	Liatroim Fontenoys	Down	2-6	Liatroim	Claire McGarry
1996	Liatroim Fontenoys	Down	5-8	Dunloy	Antrim	4-7	Dunloy	Maureen O'Higgins
1995	Liatroim Fontenoys	Down	3-11	Lavey	Derry	1-11	Lavey	Bernie Kelly
1994	Dunloy	Antrim	3-11	Liatroim Fontenoys	Down	0-12	Dunloy	Anne McKee
1993	Loughgiel	Antrim	5-7	Bellaghy	Derry	1-6	Bellaghy	Imelda Gillen
1992	Portglenone	Antrim	3-7 (Replay); Draw	Ballymacnab	Armagh	1-8 (Replay); Draw	Ballymacnab & Portglenone	Bernie Doherty
1991	Eglish	Tyrone	3-7	Loughgiel	Antrim	2-4		Nóra McGready
1990	Swatragh	Derry	5-11	Laragh	Cavan	3-8		Patsy Quinn
1989	Swatragh	Derry	1-7	Eglish	Tyrone	1-6		
1988	Swatragh	Derry	3-7	Eglish	Tyrone	2-3		Patsy Quinn
1987	Eglish	Tyrone	3-6	Swatragh	Derry	2-6		Shiela Burke
1986	Eglish	Tyrone	5-7	Swatragh	Derry	3-3		
1985	Eglish	Tyrone	3-4 (Replay); 1-13	Swatragh	Derry	1-5 (Replay); 5-1		Pauline Vallelly
1984	Liatroim Fontenoys	Down	1-7	Loughgiel	Antrim	0-2		Nuala McCartan
1983	Swatragh	Derry	5-6	Kilkeel	Down	4-7	Ballymacnab	Claire McCusker
1982	Portglenone	Antrim	1-10	Eglish	Tyrone	2-4	Eglish	Anne Kelly
1981	Kilkeel	Down	2-06	Eglish	Tyrone	1-08		
1980	Kilkeel	Down		Creggan	Antrim			Veronica MacGreevy
1979	Portglenone	Antrim	6-2	Swatragh	Derry	3-1	Glenravel	Edna Webb
1978	Portglenone	Antrim	4-2	Swatragh	Derry	2-6	Glenravel	Ann Marie O Neill
1977	Portglenone	Antrim		Liatroim Fontenoys	Down			Claire McIlvenna
1976	Creggan	Antrim	6-03	Newry	Down	0-02		Maureen O'Hara
1975	Newry	Down	5-05	Swatragh	Derry	0-01		
1974	Portglenone	Antrim	6-06	Eglish	Tyrone	3-00	Newbridge	Mairead McAtamney
1973	Creggan	Antrim		Eglish	Tyrone			Máiréad Diamond
1972	Portglenone	Antrim	6-06	Bellaghy	Derry	3-00	Portglenone	Mairead McAtamney
1971	Portglenone	Antrim		Clan na Gael	Armagh		Davvit Park, Lurgan	Mairead McAtamney
1970	Bellaghy	Derry		Clan na Gael	Armagh			
1969	Ahoghill	Antrim		Eglish	Tyrone			
1968	Deirdre	Antrim	1-6	Monaghan Town	Monaghan	1-1		Sue Cashman
1967	Deirdre	Antrim	3-6	Monaghan Town	Monaghan	1-3		Sue Cashman
1966	Deirdre	Antrim	4-2	Monaghan Town	Monaghan	1-0		Sue Ward
1965	Deirdre	Antrim	3-3	Monaghan Town	Monaghan	3-1		Sue Ward
1964	Deirdre	Antrim	3-2	Iniskeen	Monaghan	2-1		Sue Ward

== Ulster Intermediate Finals Listed By Year ==
The Ulster Intermediate Club Camogie Championship is an annual camogie competition that is organised by the Ulster Council of the Camogie Association and currently contested by the senior champions from Armagh & Tyrone.

Eglish are the current Ulster champions.

== Roll of honour ==
#	Club	County	Titles	Years won
1	Eglish	Tyrone	5	2015, 2016, 2017, 2020, 2025
2	Clonduff	Down	4	2014, 2018, 2019, 2022
3	Eoghan Rua, Coleraine	Derry	2	2010, 2011
4	Crossmaglen	Armagh	1	2003
4	Ballycran	Down	1	2012
4	Liatroim Fontenoys	Down	1	2013
4	Portaferry	Down	1	2021
4	Loughgiel	Antrim	1	2009

All-Ireland winners
All-Ireland finalists

Year	Winner	County	Score	Opponent	County	Score	Venue	Captain
2025	Eglish	Tyrone	1-10 (Replay); 3-10	Crossmaglen	Armagh	0-12 (Replay); 0-19	Granemore & Dungannon	Brenda Horsfield
2024	Uncontested. Tyone senior champions Eglish represented Ulster in the All-Ireland series.							
2023	Uncontested. Tyone senior champions Eglish represented Ulster in the All-Ireland series.							
2022	Clonduff	Down	1-10	Eglish	Tyrone	1-07	Newry	Jenna Boden
2021	Portaferry	Down	1-13	Eglish	Tyrone	2-09	Tullylish	Catherine Coleman
2020	Eglish	Tyrone	3-11	Clonduff	Down	1-03	Crossmaglen	Leanne Donnelly
2019	Clonduff	Down	2-12	Eglish	Tyrone	1-11	Pearse Óg, Armagh	Paula O’Hagan
2018	Clonduff	Down	1-15	Eglish	Tyrone	2-09	Moy	Paula O’Hagan
2017	Eglish	Tyrone	1-14	Clonduff	Down	2-09	Granemore	Cathy Jordan
2016	Eglish	Tyrone	0-19	Granemore	Armagh	0-06	Pearse Óg Park, Armagh	Ciara McGready
2015	Eglish	Tyrone	5-14	Glen, Maghera	Derry	2-05	The Loup	Ciara Donnelly
2014	Clonduff	Down	2-07 (Replay); 1-05	Eglish	Tyrone	1-09 (Replay); 2-02	Granemore & Pearse Óg, Armagh	Ursula Quinn
2013	Liatroim Fontenoys	Down	2-05	Eglish	Tyrone	1-06	Owenbeg	Lisa McAliskey
2012	Ballycran	Down	1-08	Eglish	Tyrone	1-05	Athletic Ground	Brid McGrattan
2011	Eoghan Rua, Coleraine	Derry	3-13	Ballycran	Down	1-06	Athletic Grounds, Armagh	Méabh McGoldrick
2010	Eoghan Rua, Coleraine	Derry	4-11	Clonduff	Down	2-06	Greenlough	Méabh McGoldrick
2009	Loughgiel	Antrim	1-16	Castletara	Cavan	1-02		

== Roll of honour ==
#	Club	County	Titles	Years won
1	Crosserlough	Cavan	3	2012, 2017, 2018
2	Liatroim Fontenoys	Down	2	2004, 2005
2	Keady	Armagh	2	2006, 2007
2	Lavey	Derry	2	2008, 2009
2	Bridini Oga, Glenravel	Antrim	2	2022, 2025
2	Granemore	Armagh	2	2023, 2024
3	Crossmaglen	Armagh	1	2003
3	Tir Na nOg	Antrim	1	2010
3	Ruairí Óg Cushendall	Antrim	1	2011
3	St Johns	Antrim	1	2013
3	Loughgiel	Antrim	1	2015
3	O'Connells, Tullysaran	Armagh	1	2016
3	Ballymacbab	Armagh	1	2019
3	Glen	Derry	1	2020
3	Eoghan Rua, Coleraine	Armagh	1	2021
3	Ballinderry	Derry	1	2026

All-Ireland winners
All-Ireland finalists

Year	Winner	County	Score	Opponent	County	Score	Venue	Captain
2026	Ballinderry	Derry	0-12	Crosserlough	Cavan	1-05	Blackhill	Aimee Conlon
2025	Brídíní Óga	Antrim	4-06	Dungiven	Derry	0-12	Portglenone	Torie Edgar
2024	Granemore	Armagh	2-13	Ahoghill	Antrim	0-08	An Lúb	Ciara Hill
2023	Granemore	Armagh	3-07	Crosserlough	Cavan	1-10	Castleblayney	Ciarraí Devlin
2022	Brídíní Óga Glenravel	Antrim	1-13	Granemore	Armagh	0-09	Derrytresk	Kirsty Laverty
2021	Eoghan Rua, Coleraine	Derry	0-12	Loughgiel	Antrim	0-07	Portglenone	Eilis McNamee
2020	Glen	Derry	1-11	Tír na nÓg	Antrim	0-09	Ahoghill	Rebecca Kirkpatrick
2019	Ballymacbab	Armagh	2-04	Banagher	Derry	2-02	Ballymena	Aileen McParland & Aoibhinn O'Hare
2018	Crosserlough	Cavan	1-10	Loughgiel	Antrim	2-06	Moy	Erinn Galligan
2017	Crosserlough	Cavan	2-07	Brídíní Óga Glenravel	Antrim	0-08	Tattyreagh	Erinn Galligan
2016	O'Connells, Tullysaran	Armagh	1-08	St Johns	Antrim	0-08	Eglish	Eimear Hayes
2015	Loughgiel	Antrim	1-08	Lacken	Cavan	2-04	Ballymacbab	Cara McIntyre
2014								
2013	St Johns	Antrim	2-12	Bredagh	Down	1-05	Clann Éireann	Helen Wilson
2012	Crosserlough	Cavan	2-06	Dungiven	Derry	0-07	Aughnamullen	Siobhán Reynolds
2011	Ruairí Óg Cushendall	Antrim	2-06	Crosserlough	Cavan	1-05	Killeavy	Naoimhi McCurry
2010	Tír na nÓg	Antrim	2-11	Kilrea	Derry	4-03	Lurgan	Caoimhe Crossey
2009	Lavey	Derry	5-08	Keady	Armagh	4-09		Siobhán Convery
2008	Lavey	Derry	4-06	Keady	Armagh	3-09	Keady	Helen O’Neill
2007	Keady	Armagh	3-09	Clonduff	Down	2-11	Keady	Michelle Murray
2006	Keady	Armagh	5-08	Lacken	Cavan	2-03	Keady	Michelle Murray
2005	Liatroim Fontenoys	Down	2-10	Keady	Armagh	2-08	Fontenoy Park	Lisa McCrickard
2004	Liatroim Fontenoys	Down	2-14	Castletara	Cavan	1-02	Castletara	Ann Morgan
2003	Crossmaglen	Armagh	8-15	Castletara	Cavan	0-02	Pearse Óg Park, Armagh.	Joan Murphy

== Ulster Junior B Finals Listed By Year ==
The Ulster Junior B Club Camogie Championship is an annual camogie competition that is organised by the Ulster Council of the Camogie Association and contested by the intermediate champions from Armagh & Cavan.

The competition has been running since 2018.

Over the years the counties entering it have changed as they progressed throughout the All Ireland stages.

The current holders are O'Connells, Tullysaran from Armagh.

== Roll of honour ==
#	Club	County	Titles	Years won
1	Naomh Treasa, Dungannon	Tyrone	2	2020, 2024
2	Clontibret	Monaghan	1	2018
2	Denn	Cavan	1	2019
2	Liatroim Fontenoys	Down	1	2013
2	Derrylaughan	Tyrone	1	2021
2	Lacken	Cavan	1	2022
2	Crossmaglen	Armagh	1	2023
2	Éire Óg Carrickmore	Tyrone	1	2025
2	O'Connells, Tullysaran	Armagh	1	2026

All-Ireland winners
All-Ireland finalists

Year	Winner	County	Score	Opponent	County	Score	Venue	Captain
2026	O'Connells, Tullysaran	Armagh	6-16	Ballinagh	Cavan	0-06	Blackhill	Carla Rafferty & Cliona McKenna
2025	Éire Óg Carrickmore	Tyrone	2-08	Derrynoose	Armagh	1-10	Granemore	Aoibhinn Daly
2024	Naomh Treasa, Dungannon	Tyrone	3-08	Middletown	Armagh	0-09	An Lúb	Marian Barker & Cara Little
2023	Crossmaglen	Armagh	2-22	Kill	Cavan	0-02	Castleblayeny	Ríona McConville
2022	Lacken	Cavan	2-10	Naomh Treasa, Dungannon	Tyrone	1-04	Middletown	Nicole Murray
2021	Derrylaughan	Tyrone	3-08	Castletara	Cavan	2-04	Derrylaughan	Anna McCann & Emma McAliskey
2020	Naomh Treasa, Dungannon	Tyrone	1-05	Lacken	Cavan	0-07		Cara Little
2019	Denn	Cavan	3-15	Clontibret	Monaghan	5-03	Inniskeen	Sophie Slowey
2018	Clontibret	Monaghan	1-07	Crossmaglen	Armagh	1-05	Blackhill	Orlaith Boyle

== Ulster Bridie Mc Menamin Shield Finals Listed By Year ==
The Bridie McMenamin Shield is an annual camogie competition that is organised by the Ulster Council of the Camogie Association. The competition has been running since 2006.

The competition is named after Tattyreagh (Co Tyrone) stalwart Bridie McMenamin who passed away 2007.

Over the years the counties entering it have changed. Currently the junior champions of Antrim, Armagh, Derry, Down, Cavan & Tyrone and the senior champions from Donegal & Monaghan take part.

The current holders are Ballerin from Co. Derry who defeated St Johns from Antrim in the 2026 final.

The competition does not progress beyond Ulster.

Year	Winner	County	Score	Opponent	County	Score	Venue	Captain
2026	Ballerin GAC	Derry	2-10	St Johns	Antrim	2-07	Dunsilly, Antrim	Mikela Mullan & Eabha Mullan
2025	Brocagh	Tyrone	4-09	Aghaderg	Down	1-06	Brocagh	Una McCann & Siobhán Donnelly
2024	Eire Og Carrickmore	Tyrone	1-13	Greenlough	Derry	0-07	Carrickmore	Ailise Coyle
2023	Drumsurn	Derry	5-10	Rasharkin	Antrim	2-03	Portglenone	Shauneen Mullan
2022	Ruairí Óg Cushendall	Antrim	2-09	Ballerin	Derry	1-06	Ballerin	Orla McKenna
2021	St Johns	Antrim	2-02	Magherafelt	Derry	1-04	Ahoghill	Sarah Jane McGuigan
2020	Creggan	Antrim	1-06	Magherafelt	Derry	1-05	Magherafelt	Ciara McCollum
2019	Ahoghill	Antrim	3-10	Lavey	Derry	2-07	Lavey	Fiona Blaney
2018	Naomh Treasa Dungannon	Tyrone	1-06	Glenullin	Derry	1-03	Dungannon	Catherine Casey
2017	Naomh Treasa Dungannon	Tyrone	0-07 (Replay); 1-07	Dunloy	Antrim	0-06 (Replay); 1-07	Tattyreagh & UUJ	Laura Barker
2016	Brídíní Óga Glenravel	Antrim	10-16	Kilclief Ben Dearg	Down	0-01	Eglish	Shauna Kelly
2015	Cargin	Antrim	6-08	Longstone	Down	0-11	Ballymacnabb	Maura Creelman
2014	Clontibret	Monaghan	1-13	Lacken	Cavan	2-04	The Moy	Michelle Morgan
2013	Clontibret	Monaghan	3-12	Loughgiel	Antirm	3-03	Clann Éireann, Lurgan	Shauna Finnegan
2012	Castleblayney	Monaghan	3-07	Mullaghbawn	Armagh	0-07	Aghnamullan	Róisín McKenna
2011	Castletara	Cavan	6-03	Clontibret	Monaghan	3-10	Tattyreagh	Brid Boylan
2010	Derrytresk Cailíní an Chnoic	Tyrone		Lacken	Cavan			
2009	Derrytresk Cailíní an Chnoic	Tyrone		Kilclief Ben Dearg	Down			
2008	Slaughtneil	Derry						
2007	Slaughtneil	Derry						
2006	Creggan	Antrim						

== See also ==
- All-Ireland Senior Club Camogie Championship
- Munster Senior Club Camogie Championship
- Leinster Senior Club Camogie Championship
- Galway Senior Camogie Championship
