= Deirdre Camogie GAC =

Belfast former camogie club

Deirdre Camogie Club
- Cumann Camogaiochta Deirdre
- Founded: 1920s
- County: Antrim
- Colours: Green and gold
- Grounds: Corrigan Park

Senior Club Championships
	All Ireland	Ulster champions	Antrim champions
Camogie:	0	5	10

Playing colours
- Full name: Deirdre Camogie Club

Deirdre were a successful Belfast camogie club that reached the first two finals of the All Ireland club championship, losing both. The club was founded no later than 1929 and formed the senior league in South Antrim with Ardoyne, Gaedhil Uladh McKelvey's, O'Connell's and St Mary's Training College. Deirdre won their first Antrim championship in 1937, retained it in 1938 and regained it in 1940.

In 1962 Deirdre emerged from the shadows by winning the county championship for seven years in a row. The 1968 crown was the last of the club's ten county successes and with the advent of The Troubles, it soon folded.

Deirdre won the inaugural Ulster Club Championship in 1964 and retained it for a further four years.
