= Loughgiel Shamrocks GAC =

Antrim-based Gaelic games club

Loughgiel Shamrocks
- CLG Sheamróga Loch gCaol
- Founded: 1915
- County: Antrim
- Nickname: Shamrocks
- Colours: Red and White
- Grounds: Fr. Healy Park, Fr. Barret Park

Playing kits
Home Kit	Change Kit

Senior Club Championships
	All Ireland	Ulster champions	Antrim champions
Hurling:	2	8	20
Camogie:	-	8	28

Loughgiel Shamrocks is a Gaelic Athletic Association club located in the village of Loughgiel/Loughguile in County Antrim, Northern Ireland. They are currently the only club in Ulster to have won an All-Ireland Senior Club Hurling Championship, which they first won in 1983. They repeated the feat by defeating Coolderry from Offaly by 4-13 to 0-17 in the All Ireland Club Hurling Final on 17 March 2012. On Sunday 29 September 2013, they achieved their first four in a row of Antrim Senior Hurling Championships by beating Cushendall, in the first final to be staged outside Casement Park since 1990.

== Hurling titles ==
- All-Ireland Senior Club Hurling Championships: 2
  - 1983, 2012
- Ulster Senior Club Hurling Championships: 8
  - 1970, 1971, 1982, 1989, 2010, 2011, 2012, 2013
- Antrim Senior Hurling Championships: 20
  - 1920, 1924, 1925, 1929, 1938, 1943, 1956, 1963, 1966, 1967, 1968, 1970, 1971, 1982, 1989, 2010, 2011, 2012, 2013, 2016

== Camogie titles ==
- Ulster Senior Club Camogie Championships: 8
  - 1993, 1997, 2014, 2015, 2022, 2023, 2024, 2025
- Antrim Senior Camogie Championships: 28
  - 1947, 1950, 1951, 1953, 1959, 1975, 1984, 1985, 1989, 1990, 1991, 1993, 1997, 2001, 2009, 2011, 2014, 2015, 2016, 2017, 2018, 2019, 2020, 2021, 2022, 2023, 2024, 2025

== Notable hurlers ==
- Barney McAuley
- Aidan McCarry
- Eddie McCloskey
- Mark McFadden
- Dominic McKinley
- Dominic McMullan
- Mick O'Connell
- Niall Patterson
- Liam Watson

Preceded by Loughgiel Shamrocks	Antrim Senior Champions; 2012	Succeeded by

Preceded by Loughgiel Shamrocks	Ulster Senior Champions; 2011	Succeeded by

Preceded by James Stephens	All-Ireland Senior Champions; 1983	Succeeded by Ballyhale Shamrocks
Preceded by Ballyhale Shamrocks	All-Ireland Senior Champions; 2012	Succeeded by incumbent
