= All-Ireland Senior Club Camogie Championship =

Irish camogie championship

All Ireland Senior Club Camogie Championship
- Current season or competition: All-Ireland Senior Club Camogie Championship 2026
- Irish: Craobh Club Camógaíochta na hÉireann
- Founded: 1964
- Trophy: Bill & Agnes Carroll Cup
- Title holders: Athenry (Galway) (2nd title)
- Most titles: St Paul’s (Kilkenny) (8 titles)

The All-Ireland Senior Club Camogie Championship is a competition for club teams in the Irish women’s field sport of camogie. It is contested by the senior club champions of the leading counties and organised by An Cumann Camógaíochta.

== Trophy ==
The trophy for the competition was donated by Bill Carroll, whose daughter, Ann was one of the outstanding players of the first decade of the competition, winning Championships with both St Patrick's, Glengoole and St Paul’s, Kilkenny.

== History ==
The competition was established in 1964, six years before the equivalent competitions in hurling and Gaelic football. Between 1971 and 1978 and since 2010, it was concluded in the spring following the county championships. On other years, it was concluded within the calendar year in November and December.

Teams from Galway have won the competition 14 times, Kilkenny 13 times, Wexford 9 times, Cork 8 times, Limerick and Dublin 5 times each, Tipperary 4 times, Derry 3 times, and Antrim once.

A junior club championship was introduced in 2003. The intermediate club championship was introduced in 2010.

== Senior Wins Listed By Club ==
Click on the year for details and team line-outs from each individual championship.

Club	County	Wins	Years won	Runner-up	Years runner-up
St Paul’s	Kilkenny	8	1968, 1969, 1970, 1974, 1976, 1987, 1988, 1989	4	1966, 1973–74, 1986, 1990
Buffers Alley	Wexford	5	1979, 1981, 1982, 1983, 1984	2	1978, 1980
Pearses	Galway	5	1996, 1997, 2000, 2001, 2002	0	
Glen Rovers	Cork	4	1986, 1990, 1992, 1993	2	1987, 1994
Sarsfields	Galway	4	2019–2020, 2021–22, 2022, 2024	4	2016–17, 2017–18, 2020–21, 2023
Granagh-Ballingarry	Limerick	3	1998, 1999, 2003	2	1996, 2004
Slaughtneil	Derry	3	2016–17, 2017–18, 2018–19	1	2019-2020
Oulart–The Ballagh	Wexford	3	2011–12, 2014–15, 2020–21	1	2021–22
Milford	Cork	3	2012–13, 2013–14, 2015–16	0	
St Lachtain's, Freshford	Kilkenny	3	2004, 2005, 2006	0	
Athenry	Galway	2	1977, 2025	7	1975, 1976, 1979, 1982, 1985, 2007, 2009
Cashel	Tipperary	2	2007, 2009	1	2001
St Patrick's Glengoole	Tipperary	2	1965, 1966	0	
Austin Stacks	Dublin	2	1971, 1972	0	
Mullagh	Galway	1	1991	3	1989, 1993, 2014–15
Oranmore	Galway	1	1973	2	1967, 1974
Killeagh	Cork	1	1980	2	1981, 1984
Killimor	Galway	1	2010–11	2	2012–13, 2015–16
Lisdowney	Kilkenny	1	1994	1	1997
Rathnure	Wexford	1	1995	1	1992
O'Donovan Rossa	Antrim	1	2008	1	2006
Croagh–Kilfinny	Limerick	1	1975	0	
Celtic	Dublin	1	1964	0	
Eoghan Ruadh	Dublin	1	1967	0	
Ballyagran	Limerick	1	1978	0	
Cuchulainn Crumlin	Dublin	1	1985	0	
Dicksboro	Kilkenny	1	2023	0	
Davitts	Galway	0		3	1999, 2003, 2005
Deirdre	Antrim	0		2	1964, 1965
Ahane	Limerick	0		2	1968, 1969
Portglenone	Antrim	0		2	1972, 1977–78
Glenamaddy	Galway	0		2	1983, 1988
Drom & Inch	Tipperary	0		2	2008, 2011–12
Bellaghy	Derry	0		1	1970–71
Thurles	Tipperary	0		1	1971–72
Eglish	Tyrone	0		1	1991
Toomevara	Tipperary	0		1	1995
St Vincents	Dublin	0		1	1998
Swatragh	Derry	0		1	2000
St Ibar's–Shelmaliers	Wexford	0		1	2002
Inniscarra	Cork	0		1	2010–11
Ardrahan	Galway	0		1	2013–14
St Martin's	Wexford	0		1	2018–19
Loughgiel Shamrocks	Antrim	0		1	2022
Truagh-Clonlara	Clare	0		1	2024
St.Finbarr's	Cork	0		1	2025

=== Titles by county ===
County	Titles	Runner-up	Total
Galway	14	24	38
Kilkenny	13	5	18
Wexford	9	6	15
Cork	8	6	14
Limerick	5	4	9
Dublin	5	1	6
Tipperary	4	5	9
Derry	3	3	6
Antrim	1	6	7
Clare	0	1	1
Tyrone	0	1	1

== Highlights & Incidents ==
- The controversial replayed final of 1967, when members of the Camogie Association council decided extra time should be played at the end of the drawn final between Eoghan Rua and Oranmore. Oranmore refused to play and were granted a replay after an investigation into whether the respective team captains had been notified of the extra time arrangement in advance.
- Ann Carroll’s shooting seven of her team’s ten points for St Paul’s against Ahane in the 1969 final. She won a total of five club medals with both St Patrick's Glengoole and St Paul’s Kilkenny.
- Val Fitzpatrick’s performance in Glen Rovers one point victory over St Paul’s in 1986.
- Ann Downey’s late goal to win the 1988 title for St Paul’s the year her sister was suspended after a controversial all Ireland semi-final between St Paul’s and Killeagh on 23 October. Angela Downey and Breda Kelly of Killeagh were reported for striking in the match, although neither was sent off. It led to a six-month suspension for both. If the final with St Mary's, Glenamaddy had not been called off 24 hours before it was due to start, she would have collected a seventh club medal.
- Emer Hardiman’s three goals for Mullagh in their 1991 demolition of Eglish, who had pulled off one of the shocks of the century in defeating Celtic of Dublin in the All Ireland semi-final, having earlier defeated Loughgiel Shamrocks in the Ulster final by 3-7 to 2-4.
- Angela Downey’s four goals for Lisdowney in her last club final appearance in 1994
- Claire Grogan’s dramatic injury time equaliser for Cashel, followed by Carmel Hannon’s equally dramatic injury time winning point, and Patricia Burke’s goal line clearance at the end of the 2001 final.

== All-Ireland Senior Club Camogie Finals ==
Click on the year for details and team line-outs from each championship.

Year	Date	Winner	Score	Runner-up	Score	Venue	Captain	Referee
1964	13 Dec	Celtic (Dublin)	5-02	Deirdre (Antrim)	1-00	Croke Park	Bríd Hanbury	Lil O'Grady (Cork)
1965	17 Oct	SP Glengoole (Tipperary)	3-03	Deirdre (Antrim)	2-03	Casement Park	Ann Carroll	Lil O'Grady (Cork)
1966	30 Oct	SP Glengoole (Tipperary)	5-05	St Paul’s (Kilkenny)	2-01	St John's Park	Ann Graham	Lily Spence (Antrim)
1967	5 Nov	Eoghan Rua (Dublin)	3-04	Oranmore (Galway)	4-01	Parnell Park		Bernie King
Replay	31 Mar	Eoghan Rua (Dublin)	7-03	Oranmore (Galway)	4-01	Ballinasloe	Ailish Toner	Phyllis Breslin (Dublin)
1968	3 Nov	St Paul’s (Kilkenny)	7-02	Ahane (Limerick)	1-02	St John’s Park	Tessie Brennan	Nancy Murray (Antrim)
1969	9 Nov	St Paul’s (Kilkenny)	3-07	Ahane (Limerick)	2-01	Castleconnell	Carmel O'Shea	Jane Murphy (Galway)
1970–71	28 Mar	St Paul’s (Kilkenny)	6-05	Bellaghy (Derry)	2-00	Bellaghy	Mary Conway	Jane Murphy (Galway)
1971–72	19 Mar	Austin Stacks (Dublin)	5-04	Thurles (Tipperary)	2-01	Croke Park	Mary Ryan	Lil O'Grady (Cork)
1972–73	25 Mar	Austin Stacks (Dublin)	4-02	Portglenone (Antrim)	2-00	Croke Park	Mary Ryan	Jane Murphy (Galway)
1973–74	10 Mar	Oranmore (Galway)	3-02	St Paul’s (Kilkenny)	1-03	Nowlan Park	Nono McHugh	Phyllis Breslin (Dublin)
1974–75	9 Mar	St Paul’s (Kilkenny)	3-03	Oranmore (Galway)	1-01	Ballinderreen	Angela Downey	Phyllis Breslin (Dublin)
1975–76	14 Mar	Croagh-Kilfinny (Limerick)	4-06	Athenry (Galway)	4-05	Athenry	Bridie Stokes	Phyllis Breslin (Dublin)
1976–77	13 Mar	St Paul’s (Kilkenny)	6-03	Athenry (Galway)	1-03	Nowlan Park	Mary Fennelly	Phyllis Breslin (Dublin)
1977–78	19 Mar	Athenry (Galway)	10–05	Portglenone (Antrim)	1-01	Athenry	Teresa Duane	Sheila Murray (Dublin)
1978	19 Nov	Ballyagran (Limerick)	1-03	Buffers Alley (Wexford)	0-01	Monamolin	Pauline McCarthy	Jane Murphy (Galway)
1979	2 Dec	Buffers Alley (Wexford)	2-06	Athenry (Galway)	1-02	Athenry	Kathleen Tonks	Phyllis Breslin (Dublin)
1980	9 Nov	Killeagh (Cork)	4-02	Buffers Alley (Wexford)	1-07	St John's Park	Breda Landers	Phyllis Breslin (Dublin)
1981	8 Nov	Buffers Alley (Wexford)	2-06	Killeagh (Cork)	1-04	Gaultier	Ann Butler	Helena O'Neill (Kilkenny)
1982	14 Nov	Buffers Alley (Wexford)	3-02	Athenry (Galway)	0-02	Birr	Elsie Walsh	Phyllis Breslin (Dublin)
1983	30 Oct	Buffers Alley (Wexford)	3-07	Glenamaddy (Galway)	0-06	Monamolin	Norah Gahan	Phyllis Breslin (Dublin)
1984	28 Oct	Buffers Alley (Wexford)	2-04	Killeagh (Cork)	1-04	Monamolin	Norah Gahan	Kathleen Quinn (Galway)
1985	27 Oct	Crumlin (Dublin)	4-08	Athenry (Galway)	3-02	O’Toole Park	Yvonne Redmond	Bridie McGarry (Kilkenny)
1986	26 Oct	Glen Rvs (Cork)	4–11	St Paul’s (Kilkenny)	5-07	Glen Rovers	Mary Ring	Kathleen Quinn (Galway)
1987	8 Nov	St Paul’s (Kilkenny)	1-04	Glen Rovers (Cork)	0-05	Ballyragget	Breda Holmes	Betty Joyce (Cork)
1988	4 Dec	St Paul’s (Kilkenny)	4-05	Glenamaddy (Galway)	3-07	Glenamaddy	Clare Jones	Betty Joyce (Cork)
1989	5 Nov	St Paul’s (Kilkenny)	6–10	Mullagh (Galway)	4-02	Nowlan Park	Ann Downey	Betty Joyce (Cork)
1990	25 Nov	Glen Rovers (Cork)	4–13	St Paul’s (Kilkenny)	2-07	Nowlan Park	Therése O'Callaghan	Kathleen Quinn (Galway)
1991	24 Nov	Mullagh (Galway)	4–13	Eglish (Tyrone)	2-07	Ballinasloe	Caroline Loughnane	Betty Joyce (Cork)
1992	29 Nov	Glen Rovers (Cork)	1-09	Rathnure (Wexford)	0-02	Glen Rovers	Mary Ring	Áine Derham (Dublin)
1993	21 Nov	Glen Rovers (Cork)	6–12	Mullagh (Galway)	0-02	Ballinasloe	Lynn Dunlea	Áine Derham (Dublin)
1994	20 Nov	Lisdowney (Kilkenny)	5-09	Glen Rovers (Cork)	1–15	Ballyragget	Catherine Dunne	Áine Derham (Dublin)
1995	19 Nov	Rathnure (Wexford)	4-09	Toomevara (Tipperary)	1-05	Toomevara	Geraldine Codd	Maria Pollard (Waterford)
1996	24 Nov	Pearses (Galway)	1-08	Gran-B’garry (Limerick)	2-03	Ballingarry	Ann Forde	Áine Derham (Dublin)
1997	23 Nov	Pearses (Galway)	4-06	Lisdowney (Kilkenny)	2-05	Ballymacward	Ann Forde	Áine Derham (Dublin)
1998	22 Nov	Gran-B’garry (Limerick)	1–19	St Vincents (Dublin)	1-08	Ballingarry	Vera Sheehan	Biddy Phillips (Tipperary)
1999	28 Nov	Gran-B’garry (Limerick)	2-04	Davitts (Galway)	1-03	Tynagh	Kay Burke	Biddy Phillips (Tipperary)
2000	3 Dec	Pearses (Galway)	2–11	Swatragh (Derry)	1-03	Mullingar	Áine Hillary	Áine Derham (Dublin)
2001	4 Nov	Pearses (Galway)	2-08	Cashel (Tipperary)	0–13	Cashel	Áine Hillary	Áine Derham (Dublin)
2002	3 Nov	Pearses (Galway)	2–13	St Ibar's–Shelmaliers (Wexford)	1-05	Ballinasloe	Áine Hillary	Eamonn Browne (Tipperary)
2003	2 Nov	Gran-Ballingarry (Limerick)	1–10	Davitts (Galway)	1-06	Mullingar	Kay Burke	Áine Derham (Dublin)
2004	7 Nov	St Lachtain's (Kilkenny)	2-08	Gran-B’garry (Limerick)	0-07	Parnell Park	Imelda Kennedy	Liam Davitt (Westmeath)
2005	20 Nov	St Lachtain's (Kilkenny)	1-09	Davitts (Galway)	1-04	Cloughjordan	Imelda Kennedy	John Pender (Kildare)
2006	19 Nov	St Lachtain's (Kilkenny)	1-05	Rossa (Antrim)	1-03	Portlaoise	Imelda Kennedy	Cathal Egan (Cork)
2007	18 Nov	Cashel (Tipperary)	1–18	Athenry (Galway)	0-09	Gaelic Grounds	Sinéad Millea	Úna Kearney (Armagh)
2008	16 Nov	Rossa (Antrim)	2–15	Drom-Inch (Tipperary)	1–10	Donoughmore-Ashbourne	Jane Adams	Úna Kearney (Armagh)
2009	6 Dec	Cashel (Tipperary)	0–11	Athenry (Galway)	0-09	Clarecastle	Una O'Dwyer	Cathal Egan (Kerry)
2010-11	6 Mar	Killimor (Galway)	3–18	Inniscarra (Cork)	1-04	Croke Park	Brenda Hanney	Owen Elliott (Antrim)
2011-12	4 Mar	Oulart–The Ballagh (Wexford)	3–13	Drom & Inch (Tipperary)	0-05	Croke Park	Una Leacy	Owen Elliott (Antrim)
2012-13	2 March	Milford (Cork)	3-06	Killimor (Galway)	1-06	Croke Park	Elaine O'Riordan	Ger O'Dowd (Limerick)
2013-14	2 March	Milford (Cork)	0-06	Ardrahan (Galway)	0-05	Croke Park	Elaine O'Riordan	Alan Lagrue (Kildare)
2014-15	1 March	Oulart–The Ballagh (Wexford)	3–13	Mullagh (Galway)	0-07	Croke Park	Karen Atkinson	Cathal Egan (Cork)
2015-16	6 March	Milford (Cork)	2-08	Killimor (Galway)	1-03	Croke Park	Sarah Sexton	Alan Lagrue (Kildare)
2016-17	5 March	Slaughtneil (Derry)	1–10	Sarsfields (Galway)	0–11	Croke Park	Aoife Cassidy	Ray Kelly (Kildare)
2017-18	24 March	Slaughtneil (Derry)	2–11	Sarsfields (Galway)	1-09	St Tiernach's Park		Cathal Egan (Cork)
2018-19	3 March	Slaughtneil (Derry)	1-09	St Martin's (Wexford)	0-07	Croke Park		Liz Dempsey (Kilkenny)
2019-20	1 March	Sarsfields (Galway)	1-08	Slaughtneil (Derry)	0–10	Croke Park	Niamh McGrath	John Dermody (Westmeath)
2020-21	18 Dec	Oulart–The Ballagh (Wexford)	4-08	Sarsfields (Galway)	2-09	Nowlan Park	Mary Leacy	Andy Larkin (Cork)
2021-22	6 March	Sarsfields (Galway)	3–12	Oulart–The Ballagh (Wexford)	4-05	Croke Park		Ray Kelly (Kildare)
2022	17 Dec	Sarsfields (Galway)	2–14	Loughgiel Shamrocks (Antrim)	1–14	Croke Park	Niamh McGrath	Liz Dempsey (Kilkenny)
2023	17 Dec	Dicksboro (Kilkenny)	0–18	Sarsfields (Galway)	1–11	Croke Park	Jenny Clifford	Ray Kelly (Kildare)
2024	17 Dec	Sarsfields (Galway)	1–17	Truagh Clonlara (Clare)	0-06	Croke Park	Laura Ward	Justin Heffernan (Wexford)
2025	14 Dec	St Finbarr's (Cork)	0–15	Athenry (Galway)	1–12	Croke Park		Ray Kelly (Kildare)
Replay	3 Jan	Athenry (Galway)	0–14	St Finbarr's (Cork)	0–12	Semple Stadium	Dervla Higgins	Brian Kearney (Kildare)

== See also ==
- All-Ireland Junior Club Camogie Championship
- All-Ireland Intermediate Club Camogie Championship
- Leinster Senior Club Camogie Championship
- Munster Senior Club Camogie Championship
- Ulster Senior Club Camogie Championship
