= 1974 All-Ireland Senior Camogie Championship =

Camogie championship

All-Ireland Senior Camogie Championship 1974
Winners
- Champions: Kilkenny (1st title)
- Captain: Teresa O'Neill

Runners-up
- Runners-up: Cork
- Captain: Marion Sweeney

Other
- Matches played: 2

The 1974 All-Ireland Senior Camogie Championship was the high point of the 1974 season. The championship was won by Kilkenny who defeated Cork by a four-point margin in the final for a historic first success. The match was replayed, the third time this had happened in a final in the history of camogie.

== Open Draw ==
This was the first championship to be held under the open draw. Maol Muire Tynan later to become a journalist, played in goal as Kilkenny defeated Tipperary 1–7 to 1–1 in the new open draw quarter-final at Gowran. Tipperary failed to score in the second half as Carmel Doyle scored Kilkenny’s goal. Galway kept some of their more prominent players for the junior team but put up a surprisingly good show against Cork.

== Semi-finals ==
Kilkenny needed a last-minute point from a free by Helena O'Neill in the semi-final at Wexford Park. Cork had a somewhat fortuitous first round victory over Galway but looked a team of champions when defeating Antrim in the semi-final.

== Final ==
Kilkenny were lucky to draw the final against Cork at Croke Park on 15 September with the last puck of the match from Helena O'Neill from an acute angle. Cork had first half goals from Marian McCarthy, Nancy O'Driscoll and Marion Sweeney goaled for Cork in the first-half while Carmel Doyle and Angela Downey replied for Kilkenny.Agnes Hourigan, president of the Camogie Association, wrote in the Irish Press:

This was one of the great finals in which the skills displayed by the Cork and Kilkenny hurlers were often evident. The high standard of play, the speed of the layers, and the accuracy of the free-takers all combined to make this a memorable game. Both sides missed chances but the Kilkenny attack muffed one opportunity towards the end that would probably have given them the title.

== Replay ==
Kilkenny led from start to finish in the replay and the goalkeeping of Deirdre Sutton prevented Kilkenny winning by a greater margin. At the end of the game the Cork players carried Ann Carroll, now in her twelfth inter-county season, off the field. Agnes Hourigan, president of the Camogie Association, wrote in the Irish Press:

Kilkenny gave a brilliant display in the opening half, being faster to the ball, and to the strike. Cork never gave up. They chased every ball but were not as accurate as usual in front of goal. Kilkenny clinched the issue with a goal by Ursula Grace in the 22nd minute.

=== Final stages ===
July 14
Quarter-Final

Cork	3-5 – 3-2	Galway

The Mardyke

July 14
Quarter-Final

Kilkenny	1-7 – 1-1	Tipperary

Gowran

July 28
Quarter-Final

Wexford	3-7 – 2-3	Dublin

Na Fianna

August 18
Semi-Final

Kilkenny	3-2 – 3-1	Wexford
Helena O'Neill 0-5, Carmel Doyle 1-1. Mary Fenelly 0-1.		Bernie Fox 2-0, Bernie Murphy 1-0

Wexford Park
Attendance: 1,200
Referee: Jane Murphy (Galway)

August 25
Semi-Final

Cork	8-2 – 3-1	Antrim

Glenariff

September 15
Final

Kilkenny	3-8 – 4-5	Cork
Angela Downey 1-1, Helena O'Neill 1-1, Ursula Grace 1-0, Carmel Doyle 0-1.		Brenie Costine 1-0, Marion Sweeney 0-2, Marian McCarthy 0-2, Nancy O'Drscoll 0-1

Croke Park, Dublin
Attendance: 5,000
Referee: Jane Murphy (Galway)

October 6
Replay

Kilkenny	3-3 – 1-5	Cork

Croke Park, Dublin

=== Drawn Final September 15 Kilkenny 3-8 Cork 4-5 ===
Kilkenny	Cork

KILKENNY:
GK	1	Teresa O'Neill (St Paul’s) (Capt)
FB	2	Mary Kennedy (Gowran)
RWB	3	Liz Neary (St Paul’s)
CB	4	Ann Carroll (St Paul’s)
LWB	5	Bridie Martin (Lisdowney)
MF	6	Helena O'Neill (St Paul’s) (0-6)
MF	7	Peggy Carey (Gowran)
MF	8	Mary Fennelly (Carrickshock)
RWF	9	Ursula Grace (St Paul’s)
CF	10	[Mary Conway (St Paul’s) (0-1)
LWF	11	Angela Downey (St Paul’s) (1-1)
FF	12	Carmel Doyle (St Paul’s) (2-0)

CORK:
GK	1	Deirdre Sutton (Glen Rovers)
FB	2	Marie Costine (Cloyne)
RWB	3	Hannah Cotter (South Pres)
CB	4	Sheila Dunne (Canovee)
LWB	5	Mary Whelton (South Pres)
MF	6	Marian McCarthy (South Pres) (1-2)
MF	7	Pat Moloney (Killeagh) (0-1)
MF	8	Betty Sugrue (South Pres)
RWF	9	Marion Sweeney (Killeagh) (Capt) (2-1)
CF	10	Anne Ryan (Old Als)
LWF	11	Nuala Guilly (Cloyne) (substituted off) 30'
FF	12	Nancy O'Driscoll (Éire Óg) (1-0)
Substitutes:
MF		Brenie Costine (Cloyne) for Guily 0-1 (substituted in) 30'

MATCH RULES

- 50 minutes
- Replay if scores level
- Maximum of 3 substitutions

=== Replay October 6 Kilkenny 3-3 Cork 1-5 ===
Kilkenny	Cork

KILKENNY:
GK	1	Teresa O'Neill (St Paul’s) (Capt)
FB	2	Ann Carroll (St Paul’s)
RWB	3	Liz Neary (St Paul’s)
CB	4	Bridie Martin (Lisdowney)
LWB	5	Mary Kavanagh (St Paul’s) (substituted off) 51'
MF	6	Helena O'Neill (St Paul’s) (1-1)
MF	7	Peggy Carey (Gowran)
MF	8	Mary Fennelly (Carrickshock)
RWF	9	Ursula Grace (St Paul’s) (1-0) (substituted off) 48'
CF	10	Mary Conway (St Paul’s)
LWF	11	Angela Downey (St Paul’s) (1-1)
FF	12	Carmel Doyle (St Paul’s)
Substitutes:
MF		Paul O'Connor for Grace (substituted in) 48'
FF		Mary Kennedy (Lisdowney) for Kavanagh (substituted in) 51'

CORK:
GK	1	Deirdre Sutton (Glen Rovers)
FB	2	Marie Costine (Cloyne)
RWB	3	Nuala Jennings (UCC)
CB	4	Sheila Dunne (Canovee)
LWB	5	Hannah Cotter (South Pres)
MF	6	Marian McCarthy (South Pres) (0-2)
MF	7	Betty Sugrue (South Pres) (substituted off) 43'
MF	8	Pat Moloney (Killeagh)
RWF	9	Marion Sweeney (Killeagh) (Capt) (0-2)
CF	10	Anne Ryan (Old Als) (substituted off) Half time'
LWF	11	Brenie Costine (Cloyne) (1-0)
FF	12	Nancy O'Driscoll (Éire Óg) (0-1)
Substitutes:
MF		Nuala Guilly (Cloyne) for Ryan (substituted in) Half time'
FF		Mary Canavany (Sarsfields) for Sugrue (substituted in) 54'

MATCH RULES

- 50 minutes
- Replay if scores level
- Maximum of 3 substitutions

== See also ==
- All-Ireland Senior Hurling Championship
- Wikipedia List of Camogie players
- National Camogie League
- Camogie All Stars Awards
- Ashbourne Cup

Preceded by All-Ireland Senior Camogie Championship 1973	All-Ireland Senior Camogie Championship; 1932 – present	Succeeded by All-Ireland Senior Camogie Championship 1975
