= 1976 All-Ireland Senior Camogie Championship =

Camogie championship

All-Ireland Senior Camogie Championship 1976
Tournament details
- Date: Sept 19

Winners
- Champions: Kilkenny (2nd title)
- Captain: Mary Fennelly

Runners-up
- Runners-up: Dublin
- Captain: Sheila Wallace

Other
- Matches played: 2

The 1976 All-Ireland Senior Camogie Championship was the high point of the 1976 camogie season in Ireland. The championship was won by Killkenny who defeated Dublin by a one-point margin in the lowest scoring final for 34 years. The match drew an attendance of 6,000. It was the first time that two counties from the same province met in the final of the All-Ireland championship.

== Open Draw ==
Champions Wexford made their exit to Dublin at the first hurdle, trailing four goals to two at half time and losing to a Dublin team that did not score a single point but had two goal each from Fleming and McManus and one each from Byrne and Sutton. Galway’s Therese Daune pointed a late free and goalkeeper Margaret Killeen saved a great shot in the last minute to secure victory over Tipperary. Clare had the better of exchanges and an early goal from Éilis Fitzgibbon against Kilkenny in their quarter-final before succumbing to Kilkenny by seven points, Ann Carroll and Angela Downey scoring Kilkenny’s goals.

== Final ==
The ability to get greater distance into their deliveries out of attack or from the middle of the field was the main difference between the teams in a low scoring final. Dublin got the inspiration of good starts to both halves but Kilkenny played as though they knew they had the measure of their opponents. The scoring started with two Dublin points (Mary Mernagh), before a pointed free from Helena O'Neill, Dublin started the second half with a goal from Maura Sutton from a Mary Mernagh cross 40 seconds into the second half but it was their last score of the match. Kilkenny equalised 17 minutes into the second half with a long range free from Helena O'Neill and Helena then shot the winning point nine minutes from time. They shot nine wides in the second half. Pádraig Puirséil, husband of Camogie Association president Úna Uí Phuirséil/Agnes Hourigan, wrote in the Irish Press:

Not for the first time, the All-Ireland and trophy have gone to Kilkenny because of the accuracy from frees of Helena O'Neill. The final provided a sharp contrast in styles, Dublin relying almost entirely on team-work, ground-play and speed to offset the far greater individual skills of the Kilkenny girls. We rarely saw the brilliant passages of play which have characterised other finals in which Kilkenny were engaged, but the close scoring and end-to-end exchanges ensured that excitement and interest were sustained form start to stop with never more than two points between the teams. A well worked goal, finished from a seemingly impossible angle by Maura Sutton sent Dublin two points clear 40 seconds into the second half, and only a wonderful save by Teresa O'Neill prevented them from going further ahead. But Kilkenny, the breeze freshening behind them, got timely impetus when Helena O'Neill pointed a free form 60 yards out.

John D Hickey wrote in the Irish Independent:

It was never less than a rousing struggle which gave Kilkenny their second title. Damp conditions did not inspire a high scoring rate but there were some excellent chances missed especially by Kilkenny forwards – they had nine second half wides against one for Dublin – and the losers missed out on at least two gilt edged chances for the equalizer in the closing five minutes. Kilkenny's power lay in a powerful midfield trio of Helena O'Neill, Peggy Carey and captain Mary Fennelly which pushed the winners into almost sustained attack. Their tally, however, was not enhanced by a series of wides often brought about when the ball was not distributed to better placed players. Then there were the saves effected by Shiela Murray in the Dublin goal, leaving Dublin with a chance right up to the final whistle. Perhaps Sheila Murray's best save was from Carmel Doyle just after Kilkenny had drawn level 12 minutes into the second half.

Kilkenny also won the 1976 Leinster title against the same opponents in much the same way.

=== Final stages ===
July 4
Quarter-Final

Dublin	6-0 – 2-6	Wexford

Semple Stadium

July 4
Quarter-Final

Cork	11-8 – 1-1	Antrim

Cushendun

July 4
Quarter-Final

Galway	2-8 – 3-3	Tipperary

Drom-Inch

July 18
Quarter-Final

Kilkenny	2-8 – 2-1	Clare

Cusack Park

August 8
Semi-Final

Dublin	6-1 – 3-2	Galway

Ballinasloe

August 15
Semi-Final

Kilkenny	1-10 – 2-4	Wexford

Thomastown

September 19
Final

Kilkenny	0-6 – 1-2	Dublin

Croke Park, Dublin

Kilkenny	Dublin

KILKENNY:
GK	1	Teresa O'Neill (St Paul’s)
FB	2	Liz Neary (St Paul’s)
RWB	3	Ann Downey (St Paul’s)
CB	4	Bridie Martin (St Paul’s)
LWB	5	Mary Canavany (Gowran)
MF	6	Helena O'Neill (St Paul’s) (0-4)
MF	7	Peggy Carey (Gowran)
MF	8	Mary Fennelly (St Paul’s) (Capt)
RWF	9	Jo Dunne (Carrickshock)
CF	10	Carmel Doyle (St Paul’s)
LWF	11	Angela Downey (St Paul’s) (0-1)
FF	12	Ann Carroll (St Paul’s) (0-1)

DUBLIN:
GK	1	Shiela Murray (Austin Stacks)
FB	2	Rita White] (Celtic)
RWB	3	Shiela Wallace (Cuala-Naomh Mhuire) (Capt)
CB	4	Brenie Conway (Cuala-Naomh Mhuire)
LWB	5	Mary Murphy (Presentation Terenure Past)
MF	6	Annie MacManus (Cúchulainn Crumlin)
MF	7	Felicity Sutton (Celtic)
MF	8	Barbra Redmond (Cúchulainn Crumlin)
RWF	9	Maura Sutton (Celtic) (1-0)
CF	10	Mary Mernagh (Eoghan Rua) (0-2) (substituted off) 40'
LWF	11	Noreen Fleming (Celtic)
FF	12	Ann Byrne (Austin Stacks)
Substitutes:
MF		Lindsay for Mernagh (substituted in) 40'

MATCH RULES

- 50 minutes
- Replay if scores level
- Maximum of 3 substitutions

== See also ==
- All-Ireland Senior Hurling Championship
- Category:Camogie players
- National Camogie League
- Camogie All Stars Awards
- Ashbourne Cup

Preceded by All-Ireland Senior Camogie Championship 1975	All-Ireland Senior Camogie Championship; 1932 – present	Succeeded by All-Ireland Senior Camogie Championship 1977
