= 1977 All-Ireland Senior Camogie Championship =

Camogie championship

All-Ireland Senior Camogie Championship 1977
Tournament details
- Date: Sept 18

Winners
- Champions: Kilkenny (3rd title)
- Captain: Angela Downey

Runners-up
- Runners-up: Wexford
- Captain: Margaret Lacy

Other
- Matches played: 2

The 1977 All-Ireland Senior Camogie Championship was the high point of the 1977 season. The championship was won by Kilkenny who defeated Wexford by a seven-point margin in the final for a historic first success. The match drew an attendance of 4,000. It marked the first victory as captain for Angela Downey, who also scored 2-3 in the match.

== Early Rounds ==
In the quarter-finals Wexford had a comfortable victory over Cork, Dublin defeated Antrim and 1974 junior champions Clare defeated 1976 junior champions Down (they led convincingly 5-2 to 0-3 at half time) to qualify for their first semi-final since 1944. A 20th-minute goal from Bernie Murphy meant Wexford took command of the semi-final, Clare trailed 3-1 to 0-1 at half time and their only rewards for a strong third quarter was a goal from Margaret O'Toole before Wexford finished with three more goals. Kilkenny beat Tipperary in the quarter-final and Angela Downey scored four of Kilkenny’s goals in their semi-final victory over Dublin at Parnell Park.

== Final ==
Two first half goals gave Kilkenny the initiative which they never lost in the final. In the 17th minute Angela Downey's high cross from the left was touched on by Carmel Savage to Jo Dunne who availed of a defensive mistake to score. Angela came racing back to point and then sent a close free through the crowded goalmouth to the net to put Kilkenny two goals clear. Pádraig Puirséil, husband of Camogie Association president Úna Uí Phuirséil/Agnes Hourigan, wrote in the Irish Press:

Angela Downey was the outstanding player on the field, but she got plenty of help from the other forwards Carmel Savage, Jo Dunne and Mary Purcell. Though she started at left forward, Angela switched to the right for the entire second half. Kilkenny excelled yesterday not only in their strength in the really vital positions but in the all-round efficiency of the entire side. Wexford, with the north-easterly breeze behind them, looked by far the livelier side at the start but, though they more or less dominated the outfield exchanges through the opening 15 minutes, they made surprisingly little impression on a Kilkenny defence in which Liz Neary at full back and Mary Canavany soaked up so much pressure that goal-keeper Teresa O'Neill was rarely in trouble. The sisters Brigit Doyle and Kit Codd tried all they knew to turn the tide, as did the Walshs and Mairéad Darcy but, on the day, Wexford just had not what it took to recapture an All-Ireland title from a well-balanced Kilkenny side, which has now won the title three times in the past four seasons and thus joins Wexford on camogie's Roll of Honour.

=== Final stages ===
June 19
Quarter-Final

Wexford	1-11 – 1-8	Galway

Monamolin

June 26
Quarter-Final

Dublin	2-12 – 1-1	Antrim

Belfast

July 4
Quarter-Final

Wexford	3-8 – 1-5	Cork

Monamolin

July 31
Quarter-Final

Clare	6-6 – 1-3	Down

Ennis

July 31
Quarter-Final

Kilkenny	7-5 – 1-4	Tipperary

Thomastown

August 14
Semi-Final

Wexford	6-4 – 1-3	Clare

Monamolin

August 21
Semi-Final

Kilkenny	5-3 – 2-4	Dublin

Parnell Park

September 18
Final

Kilkenny	3-4 – 1-3	Wexford

Croke Park, Dublin

Kilkenny	Wexford

KILKENNY:
GK	1	Teresa O'Neill (St Paul's)
FB	2	Liz Neary (St Paul's)
RWB	3	Anne Holden(Ballyhale Shamrocks)
CB	4	Bridie Martin(Lisdowney)
LWB	5	Mary Canavany (St Paul's)
MF	6	Helena O'Neill (St Paul's) (0-1)
MF	7	Ann Downey (St Paul's)
MF	8	Mary Fennelly(St Paul's)
RWF	9	Jo Dunne (Carrickshock) (1-0)
CF	10	Mary Purcell (Carrickshock)
LWF	11	Angela Downey(St Paul's) (Capt) (2-3)
FF	12	Carmel Doyle (Ballyhale Shamrocks)

WEXFORD:
GK	1	Kathleen Tonks
FB	2	Margaret Lacy (Capt)
RWB	3	Mairead Darcy
CB	4	Brigit Doyle (1-1)
LWB	5	Dorothy Walsh
MF	6	Breda Murphy
MF	7	Elsa Walsh
MF	8	Maggie Hearne (0-2)
RWF	9	Kit Codd
CF	10	Bridie Doran (substituted off) 30'
LWF	11	Brenie Murphy
FF	12	Eileen O'Gorman
Substitutes:
MF		Anne Kennedy for Doran (substituted in) 30'

MATCH RULES

- 50 minutes
- Replay if scores level
- Maximum of 3 substitutions

== See also ==
- All-Ireland Senior Hurling Championship
- Wikipedia List of Camogie players
- National Camogie League
- Camogie All Stars Awards
- Ashbourne Cup

Preceded by All-Ireland Senior Camogie Championship 1976	All-Ireland Senior Camogie Championship; 1932 – present	Succeeded by All-Ireland Senior Camogie Championship 1978
