= 1986 All-Ireland Senior Camogie Championship =

Camogie championship

All-Ireland Senior Camogie Championship 1986
Championship details
- Dates: June – 14 September 1986

All-Ireland champions
- Winners: Kilkenny (6th win)
- Captain: Liz Neary

All-Ireland runners-up
- Runners-up: Dublin
- Captain: Una Crowley

Championship statistics
- Matches played: 7

The 1986 All-Ireland Senior Camogie Championship was the high point of the 1986 season. The championship was won by Killkenny who defeated Dublin by a nine-point margin in the final. The match drew an attendance of 5,000.

== Arrangements ==
Galway fielded ten of their 1985 junior winning side in the 1986 Senior championship but were defeated by a last minute goal scored by Wexford’s Jackie Codd at Monamolin. Deidre Costello scored 3-1 for Galway. Angela Downey scored 4-2 in Kilkenny’s big quarter-final win over Limerick.

== Semi-finals ==
A four-goal blitz by Dublin’s Marie Connelly turned the semi-final at Monamolin in Dublin’s favour. The second semi-final at Nowlan Park was one of the best in the history of camogie’s 12-a-side era. Cork was leading by five points 3-12 to 2-10 entering injury time when, out of nowhere, Angela Downey got inside her marker and blasted the ball past Marian McCarthy from close range. A short puck-out fell to Angela. Not content to go for a point she let fly for a goal. Marian McCarthy dived to bring off a great save but saw the ball go off her stick to the unmarked Jos Dunne who scored another Kilkenny goal. Cork had led by three points at half-time and a goal from Iren O'Leary seemed to wrap it up for Cork with time running out. The Irish Independent reported:

The match was the best seen for some time. It had everything, two skilful committed teams, great scores, near misses and a breathtaking finish. From camogie’s point of view, what a pity it did not end in a draw, thus giving fans another chance to watch these great sides in action. Full credit to Kilkenny for plugging away when the game appeared to be slipping away from them. Clare Jones had her best game in the Kilkenny colours. She along with Angela Downey, Breda Holmes, Jos Dunne and Mary Fitzpatrick looked very sharp.

== Final ==
Kilkenny led 0-5 to 0-2 at half time and as Pat Roche wrote in the Irish Times, the “rate of their subsequent work was devastating,” as they built from a four-point lead to an 11-point one:

There have been few hurling matches that have been played at headquarters or any other venue this seas [sic] that could compare with the individual skills of the combatants. Ann Downey plays with the number seven on her back, which gives her the freedom of the pitch. She spent most of the afternoon breaking up Dublin attacks and sending her side forward with seariung drives into a front running division that included her sister Angela, whose lighting sorties and skills are designed to frighten any defence.

=== Final stages ===
August 10
Quarter-final

Dublin	0-13 – 1-4	Tipperary

Silver Park

August 10
Quarter-final

Wexford	3-8 – 3-6	Galway

Monamolin

August 10
Quarter-final

Cork	2-7 – 1-2	Antrim

St Finbarr's

August 10
Quarter-final

Kilkenny	6-11 – 2-4	Limerick

Nowlan Park

August 24
Semi-Final

Dublin	5-9 – 3-2	Wexford

Monamolin

August 24
Semi-Final

Kilkenny	4-11 – 3-12	Cork

Nowlan Park

September 14
Final

Kilkenny	2-12 – 2-3	Dublin

Croke Park, Dublin

Kilkenny	Dublin

KILKENNY:
GK	1	Marie Fitzpatrick (St Brigid’s Ballycallan)
FB	2	Liz Neary (St Paul’s) (Capt)
RWB	3	Anne Holden (Ballyhale Shamrocks)
CB	4	Bridie McGarry (St Paul’s)
LWB	5	Biddy O'Sullivan (Shamrocks)
MF	6	Anne Whelan (Castlecomer)
MF	7	Ann Downey (St Paul’s)
MF	8	Clare Jones (St Paul’s)
RWF	9	Jos Dunne (Carrickshock) (0-4)
CF	10	Rita Weymes (0-1)
LWF	11	Angela Downey (St Paul’s) (2-4)
FF	12	Breda Holmes (St Paul’s) (0-1)

DUBLIN:
GK	1	Yvonne Redmond (Cúchulainn Crumlin)
FB	2	Marian Conway (Austin Stacks)
RWB	3	Germaine Noonan (UCD)
CB	4	Brenda Kenny (UCD) (0-1)
LWB	5	Helen Broderick
MF	6	Una Crowley (Celtic) (Capt)
MF	7	Mary Mernagh (Cuala Naomh Mhuire) (substituted off) 32'
MF	8	Cathy Walshe (Cúchulainn Crumlin)
RWF	9	Joanne Gormley (UCD) (substituted off) 39'
CF	10	Edel Murphy (UCD) (1-2)
LWF	11	Carmel Bryne (Celtic) (substituted off) 42'
FF	12	Marie Connelly (Celtic)
Substitutes:
MF		Brenie Tone (Cuala Naomh Mhuire) for Mernagh (substituted in) 32'
MF		Anna Conda (Cúchulainn Crumlin) for Gormley (substituted in) 39'
MF		Patricia Clinton (St Vincents) for O'Byrne (substituted in) 42'

MATCH RULES

- 50 minutes
- Replay if scores level
- Maximum of 3 substitutions

== See also ==
- All-Ireland Senior Hurling Championship
- Wikipedia List of Camogie players
- National Camogie League
- Camogie All Stars Awards
- Ashbourne Cup

Preceded by All-Ireland Senior Camogie Championship 1985	All-Ireland Senior Camogie Championship; 1932 – present	Succeeded by All-Ireland Senior Camogie Championship 1987
