= All-Ireland Senior Club Camogie Championship 1976 =

Camogie championship

Winners
- Champions: St Paul’s (Kilkenny (5th title)
- Captain: Mary Fennelly

Runners-up
- Runners-up: Athenry (Gal)

The 1976 All-Ireland Senior Club Camogie Championship for the leading clubs in the women's team field sport of camogie was won by St Paul’s from Kilkenny, who defeated Athenry from Galway in the final, played at Nowlan Park.

== Arrangements ==
The championship was organised on the traditional provincial system used in Gaelic Games since the 1880s, with Ahane and Creggan winning the championships of the other two provinces. Carmel Doyle and Ursula Grace scored the vital goals for St Paul’s against Ahane in the semi-final. Athenry travelled by air for their semi-final against Creggan.

== The Final ==
Carmel Doyle doubled on an Angela Downey free for St Pauls’ second goal just before half time to lead 2-2 to 1-1 at half-time and they overcome Athenry’s spirited start to the second half to win. Carmel Doyle scored four goals in all and Angela Downey two.

Agnes Hourigan, who was then president of the Camogie Association, wrote in the Irish Press:

St Paul’s further enhanced their claim to be the outstanding camogie club in the country by winning the All Ireland club championship for the fifth time in just nine seasons. Despite some heavy rain, especially in the second half, the standard of camogie was amazingly high, and the final score did not do justice to the efforts of the youthful Athenry side. By this victory, some ten of the St Paul’s players won their second All-Ireland medal in six months. Liz Neary set a record that is never likely to be surpassed by anyone except herself. She won her sixth All-Ireland club medal, five of them with St Paul’s and one with the Dublin club, Celtic. Many felt that her clubmate Ann Carroll had also had six medals, but Ann missed one of St Paul’s victories in the early years.

=== Final stages ===
September 1
Semi-Final

St Paul’s (Kk	3-4 – 1-3	Ahane

Castleconnell

September 8
Semi-Final

Athenry (Gal)	7-2 – 3-3	Creggan

Creggan

March 13, 1977
Final

St Paul’s (Kk	6-3 – 1-3	Athenry (Gal)

Nowlan Park

St Paul’s (Kk	Athenry (Gal)

St Paul’s:
GK	1	Teresa O'Neill
FB	2	Liz Neary
RWB	3	Ann Downey
CB	4	Bridie Martin
LWB	5	Mary Kavanagh
MF	6	Helen O'Neill
MF	7	Hanora Fogarty
MF	8	Mary Fennelly (captain)
RWF	9	Angela Downey
CF	10	Carmel Doyle
LWF	11	Ursula Grace
FF	12	Breda Coonan

Athenry:
GK	1	Breda Coady
FB	2	Noreen Treacy
RWB	3	Gretta O'Brien
CB	4	Anne Duane
LWB	5	Anne Delaney
MF	6	Olive Coady
MF	7	Midge Poniard
MF	8	Ann O'Donoghue
RWF	9	Marion Freaney
CF	10	Mary Daly
LWF	11	Anne Morris
FF	12	Teresa Duane

Preceded by All-Ireland Senior Club Camogie Championship 1975	All-Ireland Senior Club Camogie Championship; 1964 – present	Succeeded by All-Ireland Senior Club Camogie Championship 1977
