= 1974 All-Ireland Senior Club Camogie Championship =

Camogie championship

All-Ireland Senior Club Camogie Championship 1974
Winners
- Champions: St Paul’s (Kk (4th title)
- Captain: Angela Downey

Runners-up
- Runners-up: Oranmore (Gal)

The 1974 All-Ireland Senior Club Camogie Championship for the leading clubs in the women's team field sport of camogie was won by St Paul’s from Kilkenny, who defeated Oranmore from Galway in the final, played at Ballinderrin .

== Arrangements ==
The championship was organised on the traditional provincial system used in Gaelic Games since the 1880s, with Portglenone and University College Cork winning the championships of the other two provinces. Angela Downey scored 4–3 for St Paul’s, who had 11 of the Kilkenny senior panel to select from, in the semi-final against Portglenone at Nowlan Park. The UCC-Oranmore semi-final was played a s curtain raiser to the All-Ireland club football semi-final between Nemo Rangers and Lurgan’s Clanna Gael.

== Downeys’ journey ==
The Downey twins traveled to Kilkeel Co Down from Kilkenny to play in the Al-Ireland colleges semi-final, via Monaghan (because a cross country team from St Brigid’s Callan was competing in the schools championship) and played in Callan’s one point win over Kilkeel. They then set out for Ballinderrin, near Craughwell in Co Galway to play for St Paul’s in the final of the club championship. Again the twins played an important part in their team’s victory and Angela scored St Pauls’ second goal

== The Final ==
Mary Conway scored two goals for St Paul’s, who were held 1-0 to 1-0 at half-time. Agnes Hourigan, president of the Camogie Association, wrote in the Irish Press:

In a closely contested first half the visitors got the fillip of an early goal when they were facing a stiff breeze and though the home side made plenty of raids on the St Pauls‘ defence they failed to register a score until Josie Kelly sent a neat pass to Pat Feeney, who netted to make the score one goal each, and so it remained until half-time. Kilkenny now with the wind advantage were quickly on the offensive and added a goal and a point.

=== Final stages ===
February 9
Semi-Final

St Paul’s (Kk	5-8 – 2-0	Portglenone

Nowlan Park

February 23
Semi-Final

Oranmore (Gal)	6-5 – 2-2	University College Cork

The Mardyke

March 9, 1975
Final

St Paul’s (Kk	6-6 – 1-3	Oranmore (Gal)

Ballinderrin

St Paul’s	Oranmore

St Paul’s:
GK	1	Teresa O'Neill
FB	2	Ann Carroll
RWB	3	Liz Neary
CB	4	Ann Downey
LWB	5	Mary Kavanagh
MF	6	Helen O'Neill
MF	7	Hanora Fogarty
MF	8	Mary Fennelly
RWF	9	Angela Downey
CF	10	Carmel Doyle
LWF	11	Ursula Grace
FF	12	Breda Coonan

Oranmore |-
GK	1	Margaret Burke
FB	2	Rita Jordan
RWB	3	Mandy Cosgrave
CB	4	Ann Dillon
LWB	5	Rosemary Divilly
MF	6	Grace Divilly
MF	7	Josie Kelly
MF	8	Nono McHugh
RWF	9	Marion Forde
CF	10	Anne Finn
LWF	11	Margaret Murphy
FF	12	Teresa Carroll

Preceded by All-Ireland Senior Club Camogie Championship 1973	All-Ireland Senior Club Camogie Championship; 1964 – present	Succeeded by All-Ireland Senior Club Camogie Championship 1975
