= 1987 All-Ireland Senior Camogie Championship =

Camogie championship

All-Ireland Senior Camogie Championship 1987
Championship details
- Dates: June – 27 September 1987
- Teams: 8

All-Ireland champions
- Winners: Kilkenny (7th win)
- Captain: Bridie McGarry

All-Ireland runners-up
- Runners-up: Cork
- Captain: Val Fitzpatrick

Championship statistics
- Matches played: 7

The 1987 All-Ireland Senior Camogie Championship. The championship was won by Kilkenny who defeated Cork by a nine-point margin in the final. The match drew an attendance of 5,496. It was the last All Ireland championship to be played over 50 minutes.

== Semi-finals ==
Irene O'Leary cashed in on two goalkeeping lapses in the final 60 seconds to earn Cork a place in the final against Wexford who had led for much of the game. Angela Downey took her scores from limited opportunities in the second semi-final and her sister, Ann, added two long-range points.

== Final ==
A first half goal each from Angela and Ann Downey won the final from Kilkenny. Mary Geaney scored Cork's goal. During the presentation ceremony Bridie McGarry accurately predicted that Kilkenny would be back for four in a row in 1988. Pat Roche wrote in the Irish Times:

It speaks well for the players eyesight, let alone their accuracy, that they could see the mini-posts dwarfed in the shadows of the main construction. But it was still another good day for the game and proved yet another opportunity for the Downey sisters to impress in an outstanding Kilkenny win. Kilkenny's captain Bridie McGarry was the star of the winner's defence. There was no doubting the skills of Angela Downey in the Kilkenny attack. Whenever she got even the half chance, you could bank on a Kilkenny score. She darted like a frightened coursing hare in and around the Cork defence to slap over four points in a five-minute spell. Her sister, Anne, was equally effective further out, maintaining the flow towards over-worked Cork rearguard.

== Fathers and daughters ==
Christy Ring was marked by Shem Downey in the 1946 All- Ireland senior hurling final. In an amazing coincidence, Mary Ring and Angela Downey marked one another in the camogie final 41 years later.

=== Final stages ===
August 23
Semi-Final

Cork	2-10 – 1-6	Wexford

Monamolin

August 30
Semi-Final

Kilkenny	3-9 – 0-6	Dublin

O'Toole Park, Crumlin

September 27
Final

Kilkenny	3-10 – 1-7	Cork

Croke Park, Dublin

Kilkenny	Cork

KILKENNY:
GK	1	Marie Fitzpatrick (St Brigid's Ballycallan)
FB	2	Rita Weymes
RWB	3	Deirdre Malone (St Brigid's Ballycallan)
CB	4	Bridie McGarry (St Paul's) (Capt)
LWB	5	Biddy O'Sullivan (Shamrocks)
MF	6	Clare Jones (St Paul's)
MF	7	Ann Downey (St Paul's) (1-1)
MF	8	Anna Whelan (Lisdowney)
RWF	9	Jo Dunne (Carrickshock)
CF	10	Liz Neary (St Paul's)
LWF	11	Angela Downey (St Paul's) (1-7)
FF	12	Breda Holmes (St Paul's) (1-2)

CORK:
GK	1	Marion McCarthy
FB	2	Eileen Dineen
RWB	3	Mary Ring
CB	4	Anne Leahy (substituted off) 35)'
LWB	5	Linda Mellerick
MF	6	Sandie Fitzgibbon
MF	7	Clare Cronin
MF	8	Liz Dunphy
RWF	9	Irene O'Leary (0-1) (substituted off) 45)'
CF	10	Val Fitzpatrick (Capt) (0-4)
LWF	11	Colette O'Mahony (substituted off) 32)'
FF	12	Noelle O'Driscoll (0-1)
Substitutes:
RWF		Mary Geaney (1-1) for O'Mahoney (substituted on) 32)'
RWF		Cathy Landers Harnedy for Leahy (substituted on) 35)'
RWF		Mary Spillane for O'Leary (substituted on) 45)'

Preceded by All-Ireland Senior Camogie Championship 1986	All-Ireland Senior Camogie Championship; 1932 – present	Succeeded by All-Ireland Senior Camogie Championship 1988
