= 1985 All-Ireland Senior Camogie Championship =

Camogie championship

All-Ireland Senior Camogie Championship 1985
Championship details
- Dates: June – 15 September 1985

All-Ireland champions
- Winners: Kilkenny (5th win)
- Captain: Bridie McGarry
- Manager: Brendan O'Sullivan

All-Ireland runners-up
- Runners-up: Dublin
- Captain: Edel Murphy

Championship statistics
- Matches played: 7

The 1985 All-Ireland Senior Camogie Championship was the high point of the 1985 season. The championship was won by Killkenny, who defeated Dublin by a five-point margin in the final for a first success in four years. The match drew an attendance of 3,500.

== Semi-final ==
Marian McCarthy scored a goal direct from a puckout in the semi-final against Dublin. A goal by Jo Dunne and the fact that Geraldine Wynne’s lastminute close-in free sailed inches over the bar enabled Kilkenny to beat Wexford by 2–6 to 2–5.

== Final ==
Dublin had high hopes. Cuchulainn Crumlin had won the club championship earlier in the year. and led by a wind assisted three points at half time but their challenge was a disappointment, despite Una Crowley scoring the game’s only goal. Angela Downey slipped over three quick points after the break, and Kilkenny were level within two minutes. Margaret Farrell added two points and Kilkenny were on top from then on.

=== Final stages ===
August 25
Semi-Final

Kilkenny	2-6 – 2-5	Wexford

Rathnure

August 25
Semi-Final

Dublin	1-10 – 3-1	Cork

Wexford Park

September 15
Final

Kilkenny	0-13 – 1-5	Dublin

Croke Park, Dublin

Kilkenny	Dublin

KILKENNY:
GK	1	Marie Fitzpatrick (St Brigid's Ballycallan)
FB	2	Ann Downey (St Paul's)
RWB	3	Anne Holden (Ballyhale Shamrocks)
CB	4	Bridie McGarry (St Paul's) (Capt)
LWB	5	Biddy O'Sullivan (Tullogher)
MF	6	Liz Neary (St Paul's)
MF	7	Deidre Maloney (St Brigid's Ballycallan)
MF	8	Anna Whelan (Castlecomer) (0-1)
RWF	9	Margaret Farrell (UCD) (0-5)
CF	10	Angela Downey (St Paul's) (0-4)
LWF	11	Jo Dunne (Carrickshock)
FF	12	Breda Holmes (St Paul's) (0-3)

DUBLIN:
GK	1	Yvonne Redmond (Cúchulainn Crumlin)
FB	2	Marion Conroy (Austin Stacks)
RWB	3	Germaine Noonan (UCD) (1-0)
CB	4	Brenie Toner (Cuala Naomh Mhuire)
LWB	5	Anne Redmond (Cúchulainn Crumlin)
MF	6	Una Crowley (Celtic)
MF	7	Edel Murphy (UCD) (Capt) (0-3)
MF	8	Anna Condon (Cúchulainn Crumlin)
RWF	9	Joanne Gormley (UCD)
CF	10	Mary Mernagh (Cuala Naomh Mhuire)
LWF	11	Carmel Byrne (Celtic)
FF	12	Marie O'Connell (Celtic) (1-2)
Substitutes:
MF		Patricia Clinton (St Vincents) (substituted on) 30'
MF		Denis O'Leary (St Vincents) (substituted on) 30'

MATCH RULES

- 50 minutes
- Replay if scores level
- Maximum of 3 substitutions

== See also ==
- All-Ireland Senior Hurling Championship
- Wikipedia List of Camogie players
- National Camogie League
- Camogie All Stars Awards
- Ashbourne Cup

Preceded by All-Ireland Senior Camogie Championship 1984	All-Ireland Senior Camogie Championship; 1932 – present	Succeeded by All-Ireland Senior Camogie Championship 1986
