= All-Ireland Senior Club Camogie Championship 1973 =

Camogie championship

Winners
- Champions: Oranmore (Galway) (1st title)
- Captain: Nono McHugh

Runners-up
- Runners-up: St Paul’s (Kk)

The 1973 All-Ireland Senior Club Camogie Championship for the leading clubs in the women's team field sport of camogie was won by Oranmore (Gal), who defeated St Paul’s (Kk) in the final, played at Nowlan Park.

== Arrangements ==
The championship was organised on the traditional provincial system used in Gaelic Games since the 1880s, with St Patrick’s Creggan, based in Randalstown, County Antrim and Thurles winning the championships of the other two provinces. Oranmore had no opposition in the Connacht championship.

== The Final ==
Portglenone were the first to score in the final, a well taken goal by Frances Graham, Pauline Brennan soon had Stacks level and then put them ahead by a point. Anne Sheehy stretched the Stacks lead with a goal that was negated by a goal by Edna Webb, but Anne Sheehy availed of a defensive error to goal again and leave Stacks ahead by 3–1 to 2–0 at the interval. Stack’s fourth goal by Mary Sherlock soon after the resumption, made the issue reasonably safe for Stacks. Portglenone, thanks to some magnificent play by Mairéad McAtamney at midfield, had their chances in this half but failed to make any impression in the sound Stacks defence and the only other score went to Stacks, a point from a thirty.

Agnes Hourigan, president of the Camogie Association, wrote in the Irish Press:

In a well contested final that produced some very entertaining passages, there was not a great deal between the sides, but Austin Stacks were far the better combined side. Their teamwork was always outstanding and their far greater match play experience was always obvious both in attack and defence. Mairéad McAtamney was once again the inspiration of Portglenone but the forwards could not turn to account the many chances the great midfielder provided.

=== Final stages ===
Feb 24 1974
Semi-Final

| Oranmore (Gal) | 2-8 – 2-4 | Creggan |

September 8
Semi-Final

| St Paul’s (Kk) | 1-6 – 0-2 | Thurles |

March 10, 1974
Final

| Oranmore (Gal) | 2-4 – 2-1 | St Paul’s (Kk) |

Nowlan Park

| Oranmore | St Paul’s |

Oranmore (Gal):
| GK | 1 | Margaret Burke |
| FB | 2 | Bridgie Henley |
| RWB | 3 | Mandy Cosgrave |
| CB | 4 | Ann Dillon |
| LWB | 5 | Rosemary Divilly |
| MF | 6 | Margaret Murphy |
| MF | 7 | Nono McHugh (0–1) |
| MF | 8 | Grace Divilly |
| RWF | 9 | Teresa Carroll (1–0) |
| CF | 10 | Josie Kelly (captain) (1–1) |
| LWF | 11 | Pat Feeney (1–0) |
| FF | 12 | Marian Forde |

St Paul’s (Kk):
| GK | 1 | Teresa O'Neill |
| FB | 2 | Nuala Bolger |
| RWB | 3 | Mary O'Neill |
| CB | 4 | Carmel O'Shea |
| LWB | 5 | Mary Kavanagh |
| MF | 6 | Liz Neary |
| MF | 7 | Ann Downey |
| MF | 8 | Helen O'Neill |
| RWF | 9 | Ursula Grace |
| CF | 10 | Carmel Doyle |
| LWF | 11 | Angela Downey |
| FF | 12 | Mary Conwau |

| Preceded by All-Ireland Senior Club Camogie Championship 1972 | All-Ireland Senior Club Camogie Championship; 1964 – present | Succeeded by All-Ireland Senior Club Camogie Championship 1974 |
