= All-Ireland Senior Club Camogie Championship 1969 =

Camogie championship

Winners
- Champions: St Paul’s (Kilkenny) (2nd title)
- Captain: Carmel O'Shea

Runners-up
- Runners-up: Ahane (Limerick)

The 1969 All-Ireland Senior Club Camogie Championship for the leading clubs in the women's team field sport of camogie was won by St Paul’s from Kilkenny, who defeated Ahane from Limerick in the final, played at Castleconnell.

== Arrangements ==
The championship was organised on the traditional provincial system used in Gaelic Games since the 1880s, with Oranmore and Ahoghill winning the championships of the other two provinces. Ahoghill had a great start to their semi-final with goals from a Moya Forde 30-yard free, another hand-passed goal from Lily Scullion until Ahane took control with goals from Joan Hayes and Marjorie Doohan.

== The Final ==
Ann Carroll’s shot seven of her team’s ten points for St Paul’s against Ahane in the final. She won club medals with both St Patrick's Glengoole and St Paul’s Agnes Hourigan, president of the Camogie Association, wrote in the Irish Press:

The vital difference was the team-work and experience of the Kilkenny girls and their far greater aptitude for taking their chances. This was typified by the way Anne Carroll had six Kilkenny points from frees and placed balls, wonderful accuracy under the conditions. For nine of the St Paul’s side, this was their second All Ireland club title in succession. Anne Carroll further enhanced her almost unbelievable record in this competition by winning her fourth club championship medal in five seasons.

=== Provincial stages ===
September 14
Leinster

St Paul’s (Kilkenny)	8-3 – 2-2	Eoghan Ruadh (Dublin)

St James' Park, Kilkenny

September 14
Munster

Ahane (Limerick)	3-4 – 1-5	South Presentation (Cork)

=== Final stages ===
September 1
Semi-Final

St Paul’s (Kilkenny)	7-7 – 2-1	Oranmore (Galway)

September 8
Semi-Final

Ahane (Limerick)	5-0 – 3-2	Ahoghill (Antrim)

November 9
Final

St Paul’s (Kilkenny)	3-7 – 2-1	Ahane (Limerick)

Castleconnell

St Paul’s	Ahane

St Paul’s (Kilkenny):
GK	1	Jo Golden
FB	2	Mary Conway
RWB	3	Nuala Duncan
CB	4	Joan Kelly
LWB	5	Liz Neary
MF	6	Carmel O'Shea
MF	7	Ann Carroll
MF	8	Mura Cassin
RWF	9	Helen O'Neill
CF	10	Rose Vennard
LWF	11	Breda Cassin
FF	12	Ann Phelan

Ahane (Limerick):
GK	1	Helen Roche
FB	2	Kitty Ryan
RWB	3	Bridget Ryan
CB	4	Mary Hayes
LWB	5	Carrie Clancy
MF	6	Betty O'Leary
MF	7	Kathleen Richardson
MF	8	Margaret Madden
RWF	9	Marjorie Doohan
CF	10	Peggy Duffy
LWF	11	Mary Tierney
FF	12	Joan Hayes

Preceded by All-Ireland Senior Club Camogie Championship 1968	All-Ireland Senior Club Camogie Championship; 1964 – present	Succeeded by All-Ireland Senior Club Camogie Championship 1970
