= 1990 All-Ireland Senior Camogie Championship =

Camogie championship

All-Ireland Senior Camogie Championship 1990
Championship details
- Dates: June – September 1990

All-Ireland champions
- Winners: Kilkenny (10th win)
- Captain: Breda Holmes

All-Ireland runners-up
- Runners-up: Wexford
- Captain: Ann Reddy

The 1990 All-Ireland Senior Camogie Championship was the high point of the 1990 season. The championship was won by Kilkenny who defeated Wexford by a ten-point margin in the final.

== Semi-finals ==
Kilkenny goalkeeper Marie Fitzpatrick, drove a long free all the way to the Cork net in an exciting semi-final against Cork. After Liz O'Neill regained the lead for Cork, Marion McCarthy could batted a dropping ball from Ann Downey into the path of Marina Downey who tapped the ball into the net for Kilkenny's winning goal. Two late goals from Barbara Redmond were not enough to gain Dublin a place in the final against an experienced Wexford team., for whom Paula Rankin’s goal at the start of the second half proved crucial.

== Final ==
Wexford took the lead in the first minute when Siobhan Dunne scored, but it was to be their last score from play in the entire game. Angela Downey scored the game’s only goal two minutes from the end.

=== Final stages ===
August 12
Semi-Final

Wexford	4-9 – 3-5	Dublin

O'Toole Park

August 19
Semi-Final

Kilkenny	4-4 – 3-5	Cork

Ballinlough

September 15
Final

Kilkenny	1-14 – 0-7	Wexford

Croke Park, Dublin

Kilkenny	Wexford

KILKENNY:
GK	1	Marie Fitzpatrick (St Brigid's Ballycallan)
FB	2	Biddy O'Sullivan (Shamrocks)
RWB	3	Deirdre Malone (St Brigid's Ballycallan)
CB	4	Bridie McGarry (St Paul's)
LWB	5	Frances Rothwell (Mooncoin)
MF	6	Clare Jones (St Paul's) (substituted off) 50'
MF	7	Ann Downey (St Paul's) (0-7)
MF	8	Gillian Dillon (St Lachtain's)
RWF	9	Breda Cahill (St Brigid's Ballycallan) (substituted off) 15'
CF	10	Breda Holmes (St Paul's) (Capt) (0-1)
LWF	11	Angela Downey (St Paul's) (1-2)
FF	12	Bridget Mullally (Glenmore) (0-2) (substituted off) 55'
Substitutes:
RWF		Marina Downey (St Paul's) 0-2 for Cahill (substituted on) 15'
MF		Anna Whelan (Castlecomer) for Jones (substituted on) 50'
FF		N O'Driscoll for Mullaly (substituted on) 55'

WEXFORD:
GK	1	Eilie Kavanagh (St Martin’s)
FB	2	Tina Fitzhenry (Duffry Rovers)
RWB	3	Elsie Cody (Buffers Alley)
CB	4	Catherine Murphy (Monageer-Boolavogue) (0-3)
LWB	5	Stellah Sinnott (Buffers Alley)
MF	6	Ann Reddy (Rathnure) (Capt)
MF	7	Christine Harding
MF	8	Joan O'Leary (St Ibar's/Shelmalier) (substituted off) 40'
RWF	9	Siobhan Dunne (St Ibar's/Shelmalier) (0-4)
CF	10	Eileen Kehoe (Cloughbawn/Adamstown)
LWF	11	Jackie Codd (Faythe Harriers)
FF	12	Angie Hearne (St Ibar's/Shelmalier)
Substitutes:
LCF		Paula Rankin (Bunclody) for Joan O'Leary (substituted on) 40'
CF		Ann Marie O'Connor (Rathnure) (substituted on) 49'

MATCH RULES

- 50 minutes
- Replay if scores level
- Maximum of 3 substitutions

== See also ==
- All-Ireland Senior Hurling Championship
- Wikipedia List of Camogie players
- National Camogie League
- Camogie All Stars Awards
- Ashbourne Cup

Preceded by All-Ireland Senior Camogie Championship 1989	All-Ireland Senior Camogie Championship; 1932 – present	Succeeded by All-Ireland Senior Camogie Championship 1991
