= All-Ireland Senior Club Camogie Championship 1986 =

Camogie championship

Winners
- Champions: Glen Rovers (Cork) (1st title)
- Captain: Mary Ring

Runners-up
- Runners-up: St Paul’s (Kk

The 1986 All-Ireland Senior Club Camogie Championship for the leading clubs in the women's team field sport of camogie was won by Glen Rovers, who defeated St Paul’s from Kilkenny by one point in an exciting and robust final, played at Glen Rovers. An injury to the iconic St Paul’s star Angela Downey after she had scored two comeback goals, was a factor in Glen Rovers victory.

== Arrangements ==
The championship was organised on the traditional provincial system used in Gaelic Games since the 1880s, with Athenry, and Eglish, winning the championships of the other two provinces. Angela Downey scored 7–5 for St Paul's in their semi-final defeat of Eglish.

== The Final ==
Glen Rovers won the final by a single point having lost a six-point lead in the closing stages. Angela Downey scored two snap goals for St Paul's before suffering a nasty injury and had to leave the field in an often robust final. Val Fitzpatrick was named Player of the Match. Anne O'Donovan became the first player to be sent off in an All Ireland camogie final at any level.

=== Final stages ===
September 1
Semi-Final

Glen Rovers	5-7 – 2-2	Athenry,

September 8
Semi-Final

St Paul’s (Kk	9-7 – 2-5	Eglish,

October 26
Final

Glen Rovers	4-11 – 5-7	St Paul’s (Kk

Glen Rovers

Glen Rovers	St Paul’s (Kk

Glen Rovers:
GK	1	Fiona McCarthy
FB	2	Mary Ring (captain)
RWB	3	Diana Deane
CB	4	Marie Ryan
LWB	5	Anne O'Donovan
MF	6	Sandie Fitzgibbon
MF	7	Val Fitzpatrick
MF	8	Mary Currid
RWF	9	Anne Hourigan
CF	10	Therese O'Callaghan
LWF	11	Geraldine McCarthy
FF	12	June Hamill

St Paul’s (Kk:
GK	1	Maria Lawlor
FB	2	Liz Neary
RWB	3	Annette Stapleton
CB	4	Bridie McGarry
LWB	5	Helen Holmes
MF	6	Clare Jones
MF	7	Ann Downey
MF	8	Caroline Holmes
RWF	9	Breda Ryan
CF	10	Breda Holmes
LWF	11	Angela Downey
FF	12	Mary Canavan

Preceded by All-Ireland Senior Club Camogie Championship 1985	All-Ireland Senior Club Camogie Championship; 1964 – present	Succeeded by All-Ireland Senior Club Camogie Championship 1987
