= All-Ireland Senior Club Camogie Championship 1987 =

Camogie championship

Winners
- Champions: St Paul’s (Kilkenny) (6th title)
- Captain: Breda Holmes

Runners-up
- Runners-up: Glen Rovers

The 1987 All-Ireland Senior Club Camogie Championship for the leading clubs in the women's team field sport of camogie was won by St Paul’s from Kilkenny, who defeated Glen Rovers by two points in dreadful conditions in the final, played at Ballyragget.

== Arrangements ==
The championship was organised on the traditional provincial system used in Gaelic Games since the 1880s, with Glenamaddy and Eglish winning the championships of the other two provinces.

== The Final ==
The final was a low-scoring affair, played in torrential rain, icy wind and a surface that cut up badly. In the sixth minute of the second half. Ann Downey sent a free into the square that was only partially cleared and which was quickly returned to the unmarked Breda Holmes who palmed it to the net.

=== Final stages ===
September 1
Semi-Final

St Paul’s (Kk	2-15 – 2-4	Glenamaddy

September 8
Semi-Final

Glen Rovers	3-8 – 4-4	Eglish

Eglish

November 8
Final

St Paul’s (Kk	1-4 – 0-5	Glen Rovers

Ballyragget

St Paul’s (Kk	Glen Rovers

St Paul’s (Kk:
GK	1	Maria Lawler
FB	2	Catherine Neary
RWB	3	Liz Neary
CB	4	Bridie McGarry
LWB	5	Helen Holmes
MF	6	Clare Jones
MF	7	Ann Downey
MF	8	Geraldine Ryan
RWF	9	Caroline Holmes
CF	10	Breda Holmes (captain)
LWF	11	Angela Downey
FF	12	Breda Ryan

Glen Rovers:
GK	1	Fiona McCarthy
FB	2	Anne O'Donovan
RWB	3	Mary Ring
CB	4	Marie Ryan
LWB	5	Diane Deane
MF	6	Sandie Fitzgibbon
MF	7	Val Fitzpatrick (captain)
MF	8	Mary Currid
RWF	9	Therese O'Callaghan
CF	10	Claire McCarthy
LWF	11	June Hamill
FF	12	Ger McCarthy

Preceded by All-Ireland Senior Club Camogie Championship 1986	All-Ireland Senior Club Camogie Championship; 1964 – present	Succeeded by All-Ireland Senior Club Camogie Championship 1988
