= 1989 All-Ireland Senior Camogie Championship =

Camogie championship

All-Ireland Senior Camogie Championship 1989
Championship details
- Dates: 3 June – 5 September 1989
- Teams: 6

All-Ireland champions
- Winners: Kilkenny (9th win)
- Captain: Ann Downey

All-Ireland runners-up
- Runners-up: Cork
- Captain: Betty Joyce

Championship statistics
- Matches played: 7

The 1989 All-Ireland Senior Camogie Championship was won by Killkenny who defeated Cork by an eight-point margin in the final. The match drew an attendance of 3,024 and marked Angela Downey’s ninth All Ireland medal.

== Semi-finals ==
A great display from Betty Joyce and second half goals from Geraldine McCarthy, Betty Joyce and Cathy Landers helped Cork defeat Wexford in the semi-final. Angela Downey scored 2–3 and Ann Downey 1–4 in Kilkenny’s comprehensive 27-point victory over Dublin also at the semi-final stage.

== Final ==
Cork tried a tactical innovation, a sweeper, in the All-Ireland final at Croke Park on September 24th. Kilkenny played with the wind but their half time lead was down to an Angela Downey goal which was secured with a poor shot for which Marina McCarthy was unsighted. Within 15 second so the restart Linda Mellerick reduced Kilkenny’s lead to one point. Angela Downey kicked a second goal and Ann Downey drove a fifteen-metre free into a crowded goalmouth. The shot was parried but Ann followed up to drive the ball home. Pat Roche wrote in the Irish Times: “the final score tends to flatter Cork who trailed 3–10 to 1–5 in the closing minutes.”

== Kilkenny’s second goal ==
Kilkenny's second goal was one of the most famous in camogie history for the wrong reasons. A shot from Angela Downey took a deflection to place it out of the reach of Cork goalie, Marion McCarthy, Angela raced in to rob Marion McCarthy of possession, Liz O’Neill's desperation tackle only succeeded in removing Downey's skirt. “Marion got the hurl, Liz got the skirt and I still scored,” she said afterwards, as unperturbed, she went on to race past two defenders to kick the ball into the Cork and celebrated the goal, skirtless. “luckily I had the regulation black knickers or I would have been suspended,” she joked afterwards.

== The skirt ==
The footage and photographs of Angela Downey losing her skirt as she scored the final goal were the subject of comment and some controversy pertaining to the coverage of women's sports. Speaking of the incident twenty years later Angela Downey said “the only time I ever made the front page of the Irish Times it was because I had lost my skirt.“ She was referring to a photograph of the event by Peter Thursfield which was to become one of the most famous in the history of the game.

=== Final stages ===
August 13
Semi-Final

| Cork | 4–7 – 2–7 | Wexford |

Monamolin

August 20
Semi-Final

| Kilkenny | 5–14 – 0–2 | Dublin |

Nowlan Park, Kilkenny

September 24
Final

| Kilkenny | 3–10 – 2–6 | Cork |

Croke Park, Dublin

| Kilkenny | Cork |

KILKENNY:
| GK | 1 | Marie Fitzpatrick (St Brigid's Ballycallan) |
| FB | 2 | Biddy O'Sullivan (Shamrocks) |
| RWB | 3 | Deidre Maloney (St Brigid's Ballycallan) |
| CB | 4 | Bridie McGarry (St Paul's) |
| LWB | 5 | Frances Rothwell (Mooncoin |
| MF | 6 | Clare Jones (St Paul's) |
| MF | 7 | Ann Downey (St Paul's) (1-4) (Capt) |
| MF | 8 | Ann Whelan (Lisdowney) |
| RWF | 9 | Marina Downey (Lisdowney) (0-1), |
| CF | 10 | Brenda Cahill (St Brigid's Ballycallan) (0-3), |
| LWF | 11 | Angela Downey (St Paul's) (2-1) |
| FF | 12 | Breda Holmes (St Paul's) (0-1). |

CORK:
| GK | 1 | Marian McCarthy (Éire Óg) |
| FB | 2 | Liz Dunphy (Sarsfields) |
| RWB | 3 | Liz O'Neill (Bishopstown) |
| CB | 4 | Cathy Harnedy (Killeagh) |
| LWB | 5 | Mag Finn (Fr O'Neill's) |
| MF | 6 | Clare Cronin (St Finbarr's) |
| MF | 7 | Therese O'Callaghan (Glen Rovers) (substituted off) 55)' |
| MF | 8 | Sandie Fitzgibbon (Glen Rovers) |
| RWF | 9 | Linda Mellerick (Glen Rovers) (1-0) |
| CF | 10 | Betty Joyce (Killeagh) (0-3) (Capt) |
| LWF | 11 | Ger McCarthy (Glen Rovers) (1-1) |
| FF | 12 | Colette O'Mahony (St Finbarr's) (substituted off) 36)' |
Substitutes:
| FF | | Irne O'Leary (Na Piarsaigh (0-2) for O’Mahony (substituted on) 36)' |
| CF | | Colllette O'Mahoney (St Finbarr's) for O’Callaghan (substituted on) 55)' |

| Preceded by All-Ireland Senior Camogie Championship 1988 | All-Ireland Senior Camogie Championship; 1932 – present | Succeeded by All-Ireland Senior Camogie Championship 1990 |
