= All-Ireland Senior Club Camogie Championship 1968 =

Camogie championship

Winners
- Champions: St Paul’s (Kilkenny) (1st title)
- Captain: Tessie Brennan

Runners-up
- Runners-up: Ahane (Limerick)

The 1968 All-Ireland Senior Camogie Championship for the leading clubs in the women's team field sport of camogie was won by St Paul’s (Kk), who beatAhane (Lk) in the final, played at St John’s Park.

== Arrangements ==
The championship was organised on the traditional provincial system used in Gaelic Games since the 1880s, with Deirdre and Ballinasloe winning the championships of the other two provinces.

== The Final ==
St Paul’s had the final won at half time when they led by 5-1 to 0-1. Anne Carroll scored 4-1 of their total and M Cassin 3-1. Carrie Clancy, their outstanding player, scored a second half goal from a thirty.

Agnes Hourigan wrote in the Irish Press:

The winners were the more experienced side, showing fine combination, perfect positional sense, better ball control and were much better strikers. The visitors, while they had some fine individual players and a fine goalkeeper, lacked teamwork and were too slow to get rid of the ball.

=== Provincial stages ===
August 18
Leinster

St Paul’s (Kilkenny)	2-4 – 1-4	Eoghan Ruadh (Dublin)

St John's Park, Kilkenny

=== Final stages ===
September 1
Semi-Final

St Paul’s (Kilkenny)	3-4 – 2-2	Deirdre (Antrim)

Casement Park

September 8
Semi-Final

Ahane (Limerick)	3-3 – 3-2	Ballinasloe (Galway)

Ballinasloe

November 3
Final

St Paul’s (Kilkenny)	7-2 – 1-2	Ahane (Limerick)

St John’s Park

St Paul’s	Ahane

St Paul’s (Kk):
GK	1	Jo Golden
FB	2	Mary Holohan
RWB	3	Joan Kelly
CB	4	Anne Phelan
LWB	5	Bríd Fennelly
MF	6	Mary Conway
MF	7	Carmel O'Shea
MF	8	Liz Neary
RWF	9	Maura Cassin
CF	10	Breda Cassin
LWF	11	Teasie Brennan (captain)
FF	12	Ann Carroll

Ahane (Lk):
GK	1	Helen Roche
FB	2	Bridget Ryan
RWB	3	Mary Hayes
CB	4	Margaret Madden
LWB	5	Kitty Ryan
MF	6	Kathleen Richardson
MF	7	Carrie Clancy
MF	8	Betty O'Leary
RWF	9	Teresa Fennessy
CF	10	Joan Hayes
LWF	11	Mary Barry
FF	12	Peggy Duffy

Preceded by All-Ireland Senior Club Camogie Championship 1967	All-Ireland Senior Club Camogie Championship; 1964 – present	Succeeded by All-Ireland Senior Club Camogie Championship 1969
