= All-Ireland Senior Club Camogie Championship 1970 =

Camogie championship

Winners
- Champions: St Paul’s (Kilkenny) (3rd title)
- Captain: Mary Conway

Runners-up
- Runners-up: Bellaghy (Derry)

The 1970 All-Ireland Senior Club Camogie Championship for the leading clubs in the women's team field sport of camogie was won for the third year in succession by St Paul’s from Kilkenny, who defeated Bellaghy from Derry in the final, played at Bellaghy .

== Arrangements ==
The championship was organised on the traditional provincial system used in Gaelic Games since the 1880s, with South Pres and Breaffy winning the championships of the other two provinces.

== The Final ==
Helen O'Neill scored three goals in St Paul’s victory over Bellaghy who had seven Derry county players on their team together with Teresa Cassidy, the former Antrim All-Ireland goalkeeper. Agnes Hourigan, president of the Camogie Association, wrote in the Irish Press:

After an uncertain start they gave a magnificent display of camogie before what was, very fittingly, the biggest crowd ever mustered for one of these club championship finals.

=== Provincial stages ===
-
Connacht

Breaffy (Mayo)	bt	Four Roads (Roscommon)

13 December
Leinster

St Paul’s (Kilkenny)	4-0 – 1-3	Austin Stacks (Dublin)

Croke Park

6 December
Munster

South Presentation (Cork)	3-4 – 2-0	Ahane (Limerick)

Ballinlough

-
Ulster

Bellaghy (Derry)	bt	Deirdre (Antrim)

=== Final stages ===
1 September
Semi-Final

St Paul’s (Kilkenny)	3-4 – 3-3	South Presentation (Cork)

St John’s Park

8 September
Semi-Final

Bellaghy (Derry)	6-2 – 0-1	Breaffy (Mayo)

Castlebar

28 March 1971
Final

St Paul’s (Kilkenny)	6-5 – 2-0	Bellaghy (Derry)

Bellaghy

St Paul’s (Kilkrnny)	Bellaghy (Der)

St Paul’s (Kilkenny):
GK	1	Teresa O'Neill
FB	2	Nuala Duncan
RWB	3	Anne Phelan
CB	4	Carmel O'Shea 0-2
LWB	5	Kathleen Brennan
MF	6	Breda Cassin
MF	7	Liz Neary
MF	8	Maura Cassin 2-1
RWF	9	Carmel Doyle
CF	10	Hele O'Neill 3-0
LWF	11	Mary O'Neill 0-1
FF	12	Mary Conway (captain) (1–0)

Bellaghy (Derry):
GK	1	Kathleen Diamond
FB	2	Annie McNally
RWB	3	Breege Mackle
CB	4	Teresa Cassidy
LWB	5	Evelyn Mackle
MF	6	Kathleen Marron
MF	7	Rosemary McPeake
MF	8	Mary McNally
RWF	9	Martina McPeake
CF	10	Eta McNally
LWF	11	Noeleen McNally
FF	12	Celine Scullion

Preceded by All-Ireland Senior Club Camogie Championship 1969	All-Ireland Senior Club Camogie Championship; 1964 – present	Succeeded by All-Ireland Senior Club Camogie Championship 1971
