= All-Ireland Senior Club Camogie Championship 1989 =

Camogie championship

Winners
- Champions: St Paul’s (Kilkenny) (8th title)
- Captain: Ann Downey

Runners-up
- Runners-up: Mullagh (Galway)

The 1989 All-Ireland Senior Club Camogie Championship for the leading clubs in the women's team field sport of camogie was won for the third year in succession and the record eighth time in all by St Paul’s from Kilkenny, who defeated Mullagh from Galway in the final, played at Nowlan Park. It was the first club championship final to be played under the new rules fixing the duration of matches at 60 minutes.

== Arrangements ==
The championship was organised on the traditional provincial system used in Gaelic Games since the 1880s, with Swatragh and Sixmilebridge winning the championships of the other two provinces.

== The Final ==
Mullagh had won Féile na nGael titles in 1985 and 1986 and were first time Galway champions. Despite scoring 4-2 they were heavily defeated by 14 points in the final.

=== Final stages ===
September 1
Semi-Final

St Paul’s (Kk	5-6 – 1-11	Swatragh

Swatragh

September 8
Semi-Final

Mullagh (Galway)	2-6 – 3-2	Sixmilebridge

= Sixmilebridge

November 5
Final

St Paul’s (Kk	6-10 – 4-2	Mullagh (Galway)

Nowlan Park

St Paul’s (Kk	Mullagh

St Paul’s (Kk:
GK	1	Maria Lawlor
FB	2	Catherine Holmes
RWB	3	Helen Holmes
CB	4	Bridie McGarry
LWB	5	Catherine Neary
MF	6	Clare Jones
MF	7	Ann Downey
MF	8	Geraldine Ryan
RWF	9	Breda Ryan
CF	10	Breda Holmes
LWF	11	Angela Downey
FF	12	Noelle O'Driscoll

Mullagh (Galway):
GK	1	Kathleen Coen
FB	2	Eilis Kilkenny
RWB	3	Mary Dolphin
CB	4	Brigid Fahy
LWB	5	Madge Kennedy
MF	6	Cora Curley
MF	7	Triona Dolphin
MF	8	Emer Hardiman
RWF	9	Aideen Murphy
CF	10	Alice Murphy
LWF	11	Imelda Hobbins
FF	12	Noelle O'Driscoll

Preceded by All-Ireland Senior Club Camogie Championship 1988	All-Ireland Senior Club Camogie Championship; 1964 – present	Succeeded by All-Ireland Senior Club Camogie Championship 1990
