= All-Ireland Senior Club Camogie Championship 1990 =

Camogie championship

Winners
- Champions: Glen Rovers (2nd title)
- Captain: Therése O'Callaghan

Runners-up
- Runners-up: St Paul’s (Kk

The 1990 All-Ireland Senior Club Camogie Championship for the leading clubs in the women's team field sport of camogie was won by Glen Rovers, who defeated St Paul’s from Kilkenny in the final, played at Nowlan Park.

== Arrangements ==
The championship was organised on the traditional provincial system used in Gaelic Games since the 1880s, with Swatragh and Mullagh winning the championships of the other two provinces. Glen Rovers changes to the team included the retirement of Marie Ryan, the loss of Val Fitzpatrick, who had moved to Boston and the arrival of Cork inter-county players Linda Mellerick and Claire McCarthy and the emerging Denise Cronin. They won the Munster championship and swept aside Swatragh in the semi-final, in a match in which Swatragh failed to score and goalkeeper Mairéad McAtamney was Swatragh’s best player. Mullagh, whose average age is just 20, trailed by just a point into the final stages of the semi-final against St Paul’s thanks to a great performance by Alice Murphy. Timely goals by Angela and Ann Downey saw Paul’s through the gfinal.

== The Final ==
Ger McCarthy scored 2–11 for Glen Rovers in the final and Linda Mellerick added 2–2 as they stopped St Paul’s bid for a ninth All Ireland club championship.

=== Final stages ===
November 4
Semi-Final

Glen Rovers	1-9 – 0-0	Swatragh

Swatragh

November 11
Semi-Final

St Paul’s (Kk	2-13 – 1-11	Mullagh

November 25
Final

Glen Rovers	4-13 – 2-7	St Paul’s (Kk

Nowlan Park

Glen Rovers	St Paul’s (Kk

Glen Rovers:
GK	1	Fiona McCarthy
FB	2	Mary Ring
RWB	3	Diane Deane
CB	4	Sandie Fitzgibbon
LWB	5	Mary Currid
MF	6	Therese O'Callaghan (captain)
MF	7	Deirdre McCarthy
MF	8	Geraldine McCarthy
RWF	9	Linda Mellerick
CF	10	Denise Cronin
LWF	11	June Hamill
FF	12	Noelle O'Driscoll

St Paul’s (Kk:
GK	1	Maria Lawlor
FB	2	Caroline Holmes (captain)
RWB	3	Clare Jones
CB	4	Bridie McGarry
LWB	5	Helen Holmes
MF	6	Ciara Holmes
MF	7	Ann Downey
MF	8	Geraldine Ryan
RWF	9	Breda Ryan
CF	10	Breda Holmes
LWF	11	Angela Downey
FF	12	Noelle O'Driscoll

Preceded by All-Ireland Senior Club Camogie Championship 1989	All-Ireland Senior Club Camogie Championship; 1964 – present	Succeeded by All-Ireland Senior Club Camogie Championship 1991
