= All-Ireland Senior Club Camogie Championship 1988 =

Camogie championship

Winners
- Champions: St Paul’s (Kilkenny) (7th title)
- Captain: Clare Jones

Runners-up
- Runners-up: Glenamaddy (Gal)

The 1988 All-Ireland Senior Club Camogie Championship for the leading clubs in the women's team field sport of camogie was won for the second year in succession and the seventh time in all by St Paul’s from Kilkenny, who defeated Glenamaddy from Galway in the final, played at Glenamaddy. It was the last club championship final to be played under the old match duration of 50 minutes.

== Arrangements ==
The championship was organised on the traditional provincial system used in Gaelic Games since the 1880s, with Killeagh and Swatragh winning the championships of the other two provinces. Angela Downey was suspended after a controversial all Ireland semi-final between St Paul’s and Killeagh on October 23. Angela Downey and Breda Kelly of Killeagh were reported for striking in the match, although neither was sent off. It led to a six-month suspension for both. If the final with St Mary's, Glenamaddy had not been called off 24 hours before it was due to start, she would have collected a seventh club medal. Ann Downey scored 2–6 of St Paul’s total in the semi-final against Killeagh. Glanmaddy’s half time lead of 1-5 to 0-1 was enough to sustain them through the other semi-final.

== The Final ==
After the suspension of her sister, Ann Downey scored a late goal to win the title for St Paul’s

=== Final stages ===
October 23
Semi-Final

St Paul’s (Kk	4-9 – 4-2	Killeagh

October 30
Semi-Final

Glenamaddy (Gal)	2-6 – 2-3	Swatragh

December 4
Final

St Paul’s (Kk	4-5 – 3-7	Glenamaddy (Gal)

Glenamaddy

St Paul’s (Kk	Glenamaddy (Gal)

St Paul’s (Kk:
GK	1	Marie Lawlor
FB	2	Catherine Neary
RWB	3	Sarah Russell
CB	4	Bridie McGarry
LWB	5	Ann Downey
MF	6	Helen Holmes
MF	7	Clare Jones (captain)
MF	8	Caroline Holmes
RWF	9	Geraldine Ryan
CF	10	Brenda Ryan
LWF	11	Breda Holmes
FF	12	Miriam Holland

Glenamaddy (Gal):
GK	1	Patricia Mitchell
FB	2	Kathleen Garvey
RWB	3	Rita Coen (captain)
CB	4	Maureen Fahy
LWB	5	Claire Wall
MF	6	Alva Baxter
MF	7	Mary Kelly
MF	8	Theresa Raftery
RWF	9	Margaret Greally
CF	10	Ann Gallagher
LWF	11	Annie Fahy
FF	12	Kathleen Comer

Preceded by All-Ireland Senior Club Camogie Championship 1987	All-Ireland Senior Club Camogie Championship; 1964 – present	Succeeded by All-Ireland Senior Club Camogie Championship 1989
