= 1975 All-Ireland Senior Camogie Championship =

Camogie championship

All-Ireland Senior Camogie Championship 1975
Tournament details
- Sponsor: Gala
- Date: 12 June – 21 September 1975
- Teams: 8

Winners
- Champions: Wexford (3rd title)
- Captain: Greta Kehoe

Runners-up
- Runners-up: Cork
- Manager: Mary Moran
- Captain: Mary O'Leary

Other
- Matches played: 7

The 1975 All-Ireland Senior Camogie Championship was the high point of the 1975 season in the sport of camogie. The championship was won by Wexford who defeated Cork by a surprising ten point margin in the final, Cork having defeated reigning champions Kilkenny in the semi-final.

== Married Captain ==
Wexford’s captain Greta Kehoe got married the day before the final to Ray Quigley who was later to become chairman of Leinster Camogie Council.

== Quarter-finals ==
Una Grac scored three goals for Kilkenny as they overcame Galway in the last quarter of the quarter final at Gowran. Tipperary| led Dublin by 3-2 to 1-1 at half time in the quarter-final but then lost their advantage in the third quarter and had to come back to level. Evelyn Sweeny scored what was to become the winning point. Deidre Lane’s late free was beaten away by Dublin’s defence and the umpires judged a late free attempt had gone wide, amid some controversy.

== Semi-finals ==
Bride Doran scored two goals and Eileen Gorman] a third in Wexford’s 3-4 to 0-2 victory over Dublin in the semi-final. Cork took command after the first ten minutes of their semi-final and dethroned champions Kilkenny, leading by 3-1 to 1-2 at half time with Pat Maloney adding a fourth goal in the second half and by the 14th minute Dublin led 3-5 to 3-2.

== Final ==
Wexford goalkeeper Kathleen Tonk was unsighted by the strong low sun when Mary O'Leary scored Cork’s goal early in the game. Wexford took control at centre field, Bride Doran scored the first of four Wexford goals in the 23rd minute to leave the scores 1-1 each at half-time, Kit Codd scored Wexford’s second goal in the 9th minute of the second half, this time with the Cork goalkeeper unsighted by the sun, and substitute Mairead Darcy added two more Wexford goals before the end. Aidan McCarthy wrote in the Irish Times

Cork played very much like a team meeting the demands called by an away league engagement. Their spirit of adventure was almost non-existent and their forces were deployed with a defensive frame of mind. In those circumstances it was only a matter of time before Wexford would breach the rearguard, and once that had been attained early in the second half, even their defence appeared to give up hope. Unable to gain any degree if parity in midfield, and with their potentially dangerous attackers starved of possession, Cork’s chance died and with it, their resolution, and the match as a spectacle. The fact that Wexford added two further goals was merely of statistical interest, as they were scored against a team which did not appear to have a lot of interest in stopping them.

Agnes Hourigan, president of the Camogie Association, wrote in the Irish Press:

Nor did their ten point margin at the end flatter the victors. Even though they were only on level terms at the interval, the winners though they had been facing a bright sun and a light breeze should by then have been clearly ahead on the play. The big occasion had, in the first half, seemed to affect the accuracy of their finishing both from play and from frees. Faster, fitter, more determined, and in the end physically stronger, the Wexford girls completely dominated proceedings, even though their authority on the field was not reflected on the scoreboard until the closing minutes. Alert goalkeeper, youthful schoolgirl Kathleen Tonk foiled Cork with a couple of wonder saves when Cork sought to rally and then the Wexford mentors played their trump card when they sent in former Enniscorthy Colleges star Mairead Darcy as substitute for Maggie Hearn. She it was who cracked home two late goals that put the seal on Wexford’s victory.

== Aftermath ==
With Wexford’s victory Greta Kehoe and Brigit Doyle became the first sisters to captain All-Ireland winning senior teams. Another sister Kit Codd, became the first player to win All-Ireland senior medals with two counties – Dublin (1965 and 1966) and Wexford (1975). Five Kehoe sisters from Clonleigh were to win All-Ireland senior medals Bridget, Kit, Josie, Annie and Gretta. Elsie Walsh later married Brian Cody winner of four All-Ireland senior hurling medals and the most successful manager in Kilkenny hurling history. Bridie Doran was a sister of Mick Jacob, the first Wexford man to win an All-Star, she had married Bill Doran who won an All-Ireland Intermediate hurling medal, brother of All-Ireland hurlers, Tony and Colm.

=== Final stages ===
July 6
Quarter-Final

Kilkenny	4-8 – 1-5	Galway

Gowran

July 6
Quarter-Final

Cork	2-12 – 1-1	Antrim

The Mardyke

July 13
Quarter-Final

Wexford	2-8 – 0-5	Clare

Ennis

July 20
Quarter-Final

Dublin	3-6 – 4-2	Tipperary

Semple Stadium

August 3
Semi-Final

Wexford	3-4 – 0-2	Dublin

Na Fianna

August 17
Semi-Final

Cork	4-4 – 3-2	Kilkenny

Nowlan Park, Kilkenny

September 21
Final

Wexford	4-3 – 1-2	Cork

Croke Park, Dublin

Wexford	Cork

WEXFORD:
GK	1	Kathleen Tonk (Buffers Alley)
FB	2	Margaret Lacy (Buffers Alley)
RWB	3	Greta Kehoe (Cloughbawn-Adamstown) (Capt)
CB	4	Brigit Doyle (Buffers Alley)
LWB	5	Dorothy Walshe(Buffers Alley)
MF	6	Brenda Murphy (Cloughbawn-Adamstown)
MF	7	Eileen Gorman (St Mary’s Enniscorthy) (0-1)
MF	8	Elsa Walsh (Buffers Alley)
RWF	9	Kit Codd(Cloughbawn-Adamstown)
CF	10	Bride Doran (Buffers Alley) (1-1)
LWF	11	Margaret Hearn (Buffers Alley) (0-1) (substituted off) 40'
FF	12	Peg Moore(St Brigid’s Kilrush) (substituted off) 45'
Substitutes:
MF		Mairead Darcy (St Mary’s Enniscorthy) 2-0 for Hearne (substituted on) 40'
FF		Bride Fox (St Brigid’s Kilrush) for Moore (substituted on) 45'

CORK:
GK	1	Deirdre Sutton(Glen Rovers)
FB	2	Marie Costine (Cloyne)
RWB	3	Nuala Jennings(UCC)
CB	4	Shiela Morgan (Canovee)
LWB	5	Mary Whelton(South Pres)
MF	6	Marian McCarthy (South Pres)
MF	7	Pat Moloney (Killeagh) 0-1
MF	8	Brenie Costine (Cloyne)
RWF	9	Mary O'Leary (Watergrasshill) (Capt) 1-1
CF	10	Cally O'Riordan (Youghal)
LWF	11	Nancy O'Driscoll(Éire Óg)
FF	12	Marion Sweeny (Killeagh)

MATCH RULES

- 50 minutes
- Replay if scores level
- Maximum of 3 substitutions

== See also ==
- All-Ireland Senior Hurling Championship
- Wikipedia List of Camogie players
- National Camogie League
- Camogie All Stars Awards
- Ashbourne Cup

Preceded by All-Ireland Senior Camogie Championship 1974	All-Ireland Senior Camogie Championship; 1932 – present	Succeeded by All-Ireland Senior Camogie Championship 1976
