= 1985 All-Ireland Senior Camogie Championship final =

1985 All-Ireland Senior Camogie Final
- Event: All-Ireland Senior Camogie Championship 1985
Kilkenny	Dublin
0-13	1-5
- Date: 15 September 1985
- Venue: Croke Park, Dublin
- Referee: Miriam Higgins (Cork)
- Attendance: 3,500

The 1985 All-Ireland Senior Camogie Championship Final, the 54th event of its type, is the culmination of the 1985 All-Ireland Senior Camogie Championship.

Despite Dublin's goal coming after 14 minutes the Dubs failed to capitalise, and went on to lose by five points in the end.
