= All-Ireland Senior Club Camogie Championship 1975 =

Camogie championship

Winners
- Champions: Croagh-Kilfinny (Limerick) (1st title)
- Captain: Bridie Stokes

Runners-up
- Runners-up: Athenry (Gal)

The 1975 All-Ireland Senior Club Camogie Championship for the leading clubs in the women's team field sport of camogie was won by Croagh-Kilfinny from Limerick, who defeated Athenry from Galway in the final, played at Athenry .

== Arrangements ==
The championship was organised on the traditional provincial system used in Gaelic Games since the 1880s, with Newry Shamrocks and Buffers Alley winning the championships of the other two provinces. Buffers Alley had 11 wides in their semi-final against Athenry.

== The Final ==
Bríd Stokes scored three goals as Croagh-Kilfinny came from behind in extra time to win an exciting final by one point.

== The Programme ==
Later the match programme became one of the most sought after collector's items in the code of camogie. Pádraig Puirséil wrote in the Irish Press:

In one respect camogie and Athenry were winners by a distance. At Thurles for the club hurling final, we had a single sheet four page programme which gave us the teams, the referee, the starting time and that, let’s face it, is the type of program that has filled the bill satisfactorily at such games to date colleague Peadar O'Brien tells me there was no programme at the club football final in Portlaoise. In complete contrast the distaff side of my family brought back from Athenry a 20-page, well-orinbted programme that included, as well as the names of the players, brief histories of the clubs concerned and of the Camogie Association, plus pictures of the two teams. The programme was entirely produced by the Athenry camogie club, with obvious support from local traders and, in this respect, the camogie club final was so much ahead of its hurling and football counterparts that there was simply on comparison.

=== Final stages ===
September 1
Semi-Final

Croagh-Kilfinny (Lk)	5-4 – 4-4	Newry Shamrocks (Down)

Adare

September 8
Semi-Final

Athenry (Galway)	0-5 – 0-3	Buffers Alley (Wexford)

Monamolin

March 14, 1976
Final

Croagh-Kilfinny (Lk)	4-6 – 4-5 after extra time	Athenry (Gal)

Athenry

Croagh-Kilfinny	Athenry

Croagh-Kilfinny
GK	1	Helen Sheehy
FB	2	Margaret Hickey
RWB	3	Margie Neville
CB	4	Anne O'Flynn
LWB	5	Eileen O'Keeffe
MF	6	Anne Sheehy
MF	7	Mary T. Hannon
MF	8	Helen Mulcair
RWF	9	Mary Fitzgerald
CF	10	Marion Doyle (1–6)
LWF	11	Margie O'Sullivan
FF	12	Bríd Stokes (captain) (3–0)

Athenry
GK	1	Breda Coady
FB	2	Madeline Coady
RWB	3	Josephine Coen
CB	4	Ann Duane
LWB	5	Noreen Treacy
MF	6	Midge Poniard
MF	7	Sarita Coady
MF	8	Ann O'Donoghue
RWF	9	Mary Daly
CF	10	Olive Coady
LWF	11	Bernie Poniard
FF	12	Teresa Duane

Preceded by All-Ireland Senior Club Camogie Championship 1974	All-Ireland Senior Club Camogie Championship; 1964 – present	Succeeded by All-Ireland Senior Club Camogie Championship 1976
