= Mary Fennelly =

Irish camogie player and administrator (1948–2025)

Personal information
- Native name: Máire Ní Fionnalaigh (Irish)
- Born: 1948 Stoneyford, County Kilkenny, Ireland
- Died: 13 January 2025 (aged 76) Kilkenny, Ireland
- Occupations: Secretary, staff officer

Sport
- Sport: Camogie
- Position: Midfield
Clubs
- Years: Club
- St Paul's; Celtic
Club titles
- Kilkenny titles: 10
- Leinster titles: 4
- All-Ireland Titles: 2
Inter-county
- Years: County
- 1972-1973 1974-1980: Dublin; Kilkenny
Inter-county titles
- Leinster titles: 3
- All-Irelands: 3

Mary E. Fennelly (1948 – 13 January 2025) was an Irish camogie player and administrator. At club level, she played with St Paul's and Celtic and at inter-county level with Dublin and Kilkenny. Fennelly also served as the president of the Camogie Association.

== Playing career ==
Fennelly first played camogie to a high standard as a student at Presentation Secondary School in Kilkenny. After entering the Leinster Colleges SCC for the first time, the school reached the provincial final in 1966 but lost out to Oldcastle.

The absence of a juvenile camogie scene meant that Fennelly first played at club level with St Paul's in 1965. She won the first of three successive Kilkenny SCC titles that year, while she also claimed a Leinster Club SCC title in 1966. Fennelly later transferred to the Celtic club in Dublin and won a Dublin SCC title in 1973.

Fennelly returned to the St Paul's club in 1974 and won the first of seven successive Kilkenny SCC titles that year. She also won three Leinster Club SCC titles during this period, as well as All-Ireland Club SCC medals in 1974 and 1976. Fennelly brought her playing career to an end after winning her 10th Kilkenny SCC title in 1980.

At inter-county level, Fennelly first played with the Dublin senior camogie team in 1972. She declared for Kilkenny two years later. Fennelly won three All-Ireland SCC medals in a four-year period between 1974 and 1977, as well as captaining the team to victory over Dublin in the 1976 All-Ireland final. Her other inter-county honours include three Leinster SCC medals and a National Camogie League title. Fennelly also earned a call-up to the Leinster team and won two Gael Linn Cup medals.

== Administrative career ==
Fennelly became involved in the administrative affairs of camogie during her playing days. She became secretary of the Kilkenny Camogie Board, a role which saw her organise the Féile na nGael in Kilkenny in 1978 and 1979, before later serving as secretary of the Leinster Council. Fennelly served as president of the Camogie Association from 1982 to 1985.

== Personal life and death ==
Born in Stoneyford, County Kilkenny, Fennelly's father had played hurling and won a Kilkenny JHC medal with Stoneyford in 1943. He later served as chairman of the Kilkenny Camogie Board. Her cousins, Kevin, Seán, Ger and Liam Fennelly, played with Ballyhale Shamrocks and Kilkenny. Fennelly was educated at the local national school before attending Presentation Secondary School in Kilkenny. She worked as a secretary in a number of firms in Dublin and Kilkenny before becoming staff officer with Kilkenny County Council.

Fennelly died on 13 January 2025, at the age of 76.

== Honours ==
Celtic

- Dublin Senior Camogie Championship: 1973

St Paul's

- All-Ireland Senior Club Camogie Championship: 1974, 1976
- Leinster Senior Club Camogie Championship: 1966, 1974, 1976, 1977
- Kilkenny Senior Camogie Championship: 1965, 1966, 1967, 1974, 1975, 1976, 1977, 1978, 1979, 1980

Kilkenny

- All-Ireland Senior Camogie Championship: 1974, 1976 (c), 1977
- Leinster Senior Camogie Championship: 1976 (c), 1977, 1980
- National Camogie League: 1978

Leinster

- Gael Linn Cup: 1968, 1978

Sporting positions
Preceded by Mary Moran	President of the Camogie Association; 1982-1985	Succeeded by Mary Lynch
