= 2022 Leinster Senior Camogie Championship =

Gaelic games season

All-Ireland Senior Camogie Championship 2022
Championship details
- Dates: 30 April – 14 May 2022
- Teams: 5

All-Ireland champions
- Winners: Kilkenny (23rd win)
- Captain: Aoife Prendergast
- Manager: Brian Dowling

All-Ireland runners-up
- Runners-up: Dublin
- Captain: Hannah Hegarty
- Manager: Adrian O'Sullivan

Championship statistics
- Matches played: 4

The 2022 Leinster Senior Camogie Championship was run as a standalone competition in April and May 2022. It was not part of the 2022 All-Ireland Senior Camogie Championship. Kilkenny beat Dublin in the final. The second-tier competition, the 2022 Leinster Intermediate Camogie Championship, was won by Meath. The third tier competition, the 2022 Leinster Junior Camogie Championship, was won by Wicklow.

== Teams ==
5 teams took part in a knock-out competition.

- Dublin
- Kilkenny
- Offaly
- Westmeath
- Wexford

== Knockout stage ==
=== Preliminary round ===
30 April 2022; Preliminary round	Kilkenny	0-13 (13) (4) 0-04	Wexford
30 April 2022; Preliminary round		Result

=== Semi-finals ===
7 May 2022; Semi-final	Offaly	1-12 (15) (26) 4-14	Kilkenny	Birr; Referee: Barry Nea (Westmeath)
7 May 2022; Semi-final		Report		Birr; Referee: Barry Nea (Westmeath)

7 May 2022; Semi-final	Dublin	1-15 (18) (4) 0-04	Westmeath	National Sports Campus; Referee: Liz Dempsey (Kilkenny)
7 May 2022; Semi-final		Report		National Sports Campus; Referee: Liz Dempsey (Kilkenny)

=== Final ===
14 May 2022; 14:45; Final	Kilkenny	5-11 (26) (12) 0-12	Dublin	O'Moore Park; Referee: Ray Kelly (Kildare)
14 May 2022; 14:45; Final		Report		O'Moore Park; Referee: Ray Kelly (Kildare)
