= Liz Howard =

Irish camogie player (1921–2026)

Elizabeth Howard, Éilís Níc Iomhair

27th President of the Camogie Association
- In office 2006–2009
- Succeeded by: Joan O'Flynn, Cork

Personal details
- Born: 1948 Deerpark, Carrick-on-Suir, County Tipperary, Ireland
- Died: 21 May 2026 (aged 78) Dublin, Ireland
- Profession: Manager, Aer Lingus, HR Consultant

Elizabeth Howard (Éilís Níc Iomhair; 1948 – 21 May 2026) was an Irish camogie player who was the 27th President of the Camogie Association.

== Background ==
Howard, from Deerpark, Carrick-on-Suir, County Tipperary, was the daughter of Limerick hurler, Garrett Howard, and Josephine (née Barry) from Newtown, Nenagh. Garrett won five All Ireland medals and was awarded the Bank of Ireland All Time All Star Award. Under the guidance of her parents, she and her sisters started a Camogie club in Feakle, County Clare.

Howard died in Dublin on 21 May 2026, at the age of 78.

== Career ==
During the presidency of Miriam O'Callaghan, Howard, Sile Wallace, Jo Golden, and Sinead O'Connor developed the Strategic Plan 2004–2008; this was the template to grow and develop Camogie. O'Callaghan asked Howard to get back involved with Camogie. Following her election as president, Howard initiated an in-depth review to assess the strengths and weaknesses of the Camogie Association. This was carried out by Atlantic Sports Management and funded by the Irish Sports Council. The review led to a six-year National Development Plan, which was launched at Annual Congress in Newbridge in March 2010. This led to a new Constitution for the Camogie Association, and was ratified at a special Congress in 2010. She focused on raising the profile of the Association, promoting the stars of the game, developing the game and growing the sport by working with Sinead O'Connor, Chief Executive of the Association. Using her HR experience, a vibrant and professional full-time Development and Administrative team were recruited. RTÉ came on board to include Camogie on The Sunday Game. TG4 televised the Junior All Ireland Final for the first time and general media coverage grew. She was involved in replacing the O'Duffy Cup with a new one. At the end of her presidency, she said that the sport can grow even more.

Howard worked closely with the GAA. Her previous role as Tipperary GAA PRO benefited Camogie, as she was able to network with her contacts, with the particular support of Liam O'Neill (Chairman of Leinster GAA Council) and Nickey Brennan (President of the GAA) agreeing to twin the All Ireland Senior and Junior Camogie finals with the U 21 All Ireland Hurling final in Croke Park - an arrangement that lasted from 2006 to 2009. This helped raise attendances to record levels, peaking at 33,154 for the 2007 final between Wexford and Cork.

New sponsorship deals were signed with Gala, O'Neills and Coillte. Bursaries for Third level players were launched. With the Chief Executive, she forged links with the Irish Sports Council and initiated links with Sports Partnerships and Local Authorities.

In 2007, she suggested that Camogie be renamed 'Women's Hurling', which did not materialise.

== Broadcast ==
When RTÉ introduced the GAA programme The Sunday Game in 1979, Howard was the first female analyst on the programme. She has been a regular panelist on both TV and radio. She had a weekly column in the local Tipperary papers during her time as Tipperary GAA PRO.

== GAA PRO ==
Howard served as Tipperary GAA PRO for 22 years (1981–2003, with the exception of 1983), the first woman to be elected as an officer of the Tipperary County Board. In 1997, Clare defeated Tipperary in the Munster Senior Hurling Final. Clare Capitain Anthony Daly, in his victory speech after the game, stated that Clare were 'No longer the whipping boys of Munster'. In her PRO notes, Howard called Daly's comments 'Conduct unbecoming'. This further stirred the rivalry in Clare. Ger Loughnane went for her in 1998, but Howard viewed it with amusement as a typical Loughnane smoke screen to divert pressure from his team. Joe Mc Donagh, President of the GAA, appointed her as Chair of the Increased Participation Committee (to develop greater involvement of Camogie and Ladies Football with the GAA). She served as a member of the GAA Communications Committee during the presidency of Dr. Mick Loftus. She also served as a Member of the Munster Council PR Committee.

== Awards ==
In January 2010, Howard received the award for National Administrator of the Year at the inaugural Awards to Volunteers in Irish Sport. She was chosen as Tipperary Person of the Year in 2007 and was honoured by Burgess GAA Club on her election as President of the Camogie Association.
