= Leinster Senior Camogie Championship =

Camogie championship

- Irish: Craobh Shinsir Camógaíochta Laighean
- Founded: 1934
- Title holders: Wexford (22nd title)
- Most titles: Dublin (42 titles)

The Leinster Senior Camogie Championship is a competition for inter-county teams in the women's field sport of game of camogie played in Leinster.

== Roll of Honour ==
Team	Wins	Years won
Dublin	42	1935, 1936, 1937, 1938, 1939, 1940, 1941, 1942, 1943, 1944, 1945, 1946, 1947, 1948, 1949, 1950, 1951, 1952, 1953, 1954, 1955, 1956, 1957, 1958, 1959, 1960, 1961, 1962, 1963, 1964, 1965, 1966, 1967, 1975, 1979, 1981, 1982, 1983, 1984, 1985, 1986, 1987
Kilkenny	26	1970, 1972, 1976, 1977, 1980, 1988, 1989, 1990, 1992, 1993, 1996, 1997, 1998, 2002, 2005, 2006, 2008, 2009, 2015, 2017, 2018, 2019, 2022, 2023, 2024, 2025
Wexford	22	1968, 1969, 1971, 1973, 1974, 1978, 1991, 1994, 1995, 1999, 2000, 2001, 2003, 2004, 2007, 2010, 2011, 2012, 2013, 2014, 2016, 2026
Louth	1	1934

Year	Winner
1934	Louth
1935	Dublin
1936	Dublin
1937	Dublin
1938	Dublin
1939	Dublin
1940	Dublin
1941	Dublin
1942	Dublin
1943	Dublin
1944	Dublin
1945	Dublin
1946	Dublin
1947	Dublin
1948	Dublin
1949	Dublin
1950	Dublin
1951	Dublin
1952	Dublin
1953	Dublin
1954	Dublin
1955	Dublin
1956	Dublin
1957	Dublin
1958	Dublin
1959	Dublin
1960	Dublin
1961	Dublin
1962	Dublin
1963	Dublin
1964	Dublin
1965	Dublin
1966	Dublin
1967	Dublin
1968	Wexford
1969	Wexford
1970	Kilkenny
1971	Wexford
1972	Kilkenny
1973	Wexford
1974	Wexford
1975	Dublin
1976	Kilkenny
1977	Kilkenny
1978	Wexford
1979	Dublin
1980	Kilkenny
1981	Dublin
1982	Dublin
1983	Dublin
1984	Dublin
1985	Dublin
1986	Dublin
1987	Dublin
1988	Kilkenny
1989	Kilkenny
1990	Kilkenny
1991	Wexford
1992	Kilkenny
1993	Kilkenny
1994	Wexford
1995	Wexford
1996	Kilkenny
1997	Kilkenny
1998	Kilkenny
1999	Wexford
2000	Wexford
2001	Wexford
2002	Kilkenny
2003	Wexford
2004	Wexford
2005	Kilkenny
2006	Kilkenny
2007	Wexford
2008	Kilkenny
2009	Kilkenny
2010	Wexford
2011	Wexford
2012	Wexford
2013	Wexford
2014	Wexford
2015	Kilkenny
2016	Wexford
2017	Kilkenny
2018	Kilkenny
2019	Kilkenny
2020	Not held
2021	Not held
2022	Kilkenny
2023	Kilkenny
2024	Kilkenny
2025	Kilkenny
2026	Wexford

== See also ==
- All-Ireland Senior Camogie Championship
