= Mary Kavanagh =

Mary Kavanagh RCA, FRSC
- Born: 1965 (age 60–61); Toronto, Ontario, Canada
- Education: University of Guelph; University of Saskatchewan; University of Western Ontario
- Known for: Visual art; Interdisciplinary art
- Website: https://www.marykavanagh.ca/

Mary Kavanagh is a Canadian visual artist and educator. She is a Professor and a Board of Governors Research Chair at the University of Lethbridge. Her work encompasses drawing, sculpture, photography, moving image installation, and archival practices.

== Biography ==
Mary Kavanagh was born in Toronto, Ontario in 1965. After completing her foundation training in Visual Arts at York University, she studied at the University of Guelph, graduating with a Bachelor of Arts - Honours in 1992. Kavanagh received a Master of Fine Arts from the University of Saskatchewan in 1995, and a Master of Arts in Art History from the University of Western Ontario in 2003.

Since 2000, Kavanagh has taught Art Studio in the Department of Art at the University of Lethbridge, where she is a Professor and Board of Governors Research Chair, Tier I in Fine Arts. She has held senior administrative positions including Art Department Chair, and MFA/MMus Graduate Program Chair, School of Graduate Studies. In 2007 she was Visiting Professor at Hokkai-Gakuen University, Sapporo, Japan, and in 2018 she was appointed Associate Member of the Documentary Media Research Centre (DMRC), School of Image Arts, Toronto Metropolitan University. She serves on the Board of Directors of the Southern Alberta Art Gallery.

In 2021 Kavanagh was elected Fellow of the Royal Society of Canada, Academy of Arts and Humanities. In 2024 she was inducted into the Royal Canadian Academy of Arts.

== Work ==
With a background in art history and critical theory, Kavanagh's art practice has been shaped by the aesthetic and social histories of representation and abstraction, by conceptual art and auto-ethnography. Her early work was largely concerned with embodiment and memory, with projects focused on the intersection of biographical, academic, and museological practices. Significant projects from this period include prelude, polish,Shadow Archive, and Seeking Georgia, each of which addresses the material evidence of time and place. More recent projects involve immersion in sites with complex or difficult histories resulting in multi-faceted exhibitions that explore access to publicly held lands, institutions, and data. Atomic Suite documents the historic Wendover Air Force Base at Wendover, Utah; The Expulsion addresses atmospheric degradation; while Track of Interest captures a period of tri-national military collaboration between NORAD and RFAF. Her work was selected for inclusion in the Alberta Biennial of Contemporary Art in 2007 and again in 2015.

Kavanagh was Principal Investigator of a SSHRC Insight Grant for Atomic Tourist: Trinity, a research-creation project focused on the Trinity atomic bomb test site in New Mexico. With projects in Canada, Japan, and the United States, Kavanagh’s interest in the veiled history of nuclear armament resulted in her immersive, multivalent exhibition, Daughters of Uranium (2019-2020). A publication of the same name features essays by cultural anthropologist, Peter C. van Wyck, and art critic, Jayne Wilkinson. Her short film, Trinity 3, combines on-site interviews with archival footage directly related to the 1945 Trinity test, and was presented as part of her solo exhibition, Daughters of Uranium. In his catalogue essay, "Reading the Remains," writer and cultural anthropologist Peter C. van Wyck states:

Kavanagh’s work draws us toward an understanding of human entanglements with the earth that directs our attention not toward the past in obsessively seeking to place a spike or mark a calendar… but toward an understanding of the past as a record or archive of prior media, prior mediations—potentialities, shimmers maybe—that are always and already at work in the present.

Artist residencies at the Center for Land Use Interpretation, Wendover, Utah; the Santa Fe Art Institute, Santa Fe, New Mexico; Bundanon, NSW, Australia; and the Canadian Forces Artists' Program, Ottawa, Ontario, have taken her to remote locations including active military bases, weapons testing and research facilities, and sites of industry, extraction, and remediation.

Kavanagh was one of 51 Canadian artists interviewed in Voices: Artists on Art - Contemporary Art 50 years after Sculpture ’67, an archive of interviews first exhibited at Artport Gallery, Harbourfront Centre, Toronto in 2017, before travelling to Zayed University, Dubai and Abudhabi, UAE in 2019. Conceived and organized by Yvonne Lammerich and Ian Carr-Harris, the project resulted in a book of the same name.

== Collections ==
Kavanagh's work is held in public collections including the Alberta Foundation for the Arts, the Kitchener-Waterloo Art Gallery, and the Canadian War Museum.
