= Shem Downey =

Irish hurler

James "Shem" Downey
Personal information
- Native name: Séamus Ó Dúnaigh (Irish)
- Born: 5 January 1922 Conahy, County Kilkenny, Ireland
- Died: 22 December 2013 (aged 91) Ballyraggett, County Kilkenny, Ireland
- Occupation: Butcher
- Height: 5 ft 9 in (175 cm)

Sport
- Sport: Hurling
- Position: Midfield
Club
- Years: Club
- Tullaroan
Club titles
- Kilkenny titles: 1
Inter-county*
Years	County	Apps (scores)
1946-1954	Kilkenny	19 (7-26)
Inter-county titles
- Leinster titles: 3
- All-Irelands: 1
- NHL: 0
- *Inter County team apps and scores correct as of 12:48, 27 December 2013.

James "Shem" Downey (5 January 1922 – 22 December 2013) was an Irish hurler who played as a midfielder for the Kilkenny senior team.

Born in Conahy, County Kilkenny, Downey first arrived on the inter-county scene at the age of seventeen when he first linked up with the Kilkenny minor team. He made his senior debut in the 1946 championship. Downey went on to play a key part for Kilkenny over the following eight years, and won one All-Ireland medal and three Leinster medals. He was an All-Ireland runner-up on two occasions.

Downey was a member of the Leinster inter-provincial team on a number of occasions throughout his career, however, he never won a Railway Cup medal. At club level he won one championship medal with Tullaroan.

His retirement came following Kilkenny's defeat by Wexford in the 1954 championship.

Downey's daughters, Angela and Ann, are regarded as two of the greatest camogie players of all-time, and won twelve All-Ireland medals with Kilkenny.

== Honours ==
=== Team ===
Tullaroan

- Kilkenny Senior Hurling Championship (1): 1948

Kilkenny

- All-Ireland Senior Hurling Championship (1): 1947
- Leinster Senior Hurling Championship (7): 1947, 1950, 1953
- Leinster Minor Hurling Championship (1): 1939
