= Joan Hayes =

American politician (1916–2005)

Member of the Hawaii House of Representatives
- In office 1983–1990

Personal details
- Born: February 29, 1916
- Died: August 6, 2005 (aged 89)
- Party: Democratic
- Children: 2
- Education: Radcliffe College

Joan Hayes (February 29, 1916 – August 6, 2005) was an American politician. She served as a Democratic member of the Hawaii House of Representatives. 1953, she was the first woman to be registered as a lobbyist in Washington, D.C.
