= Crumlin GAA =

Gaelic games club in County Dublin, Ireland

Crumlin
- Croimghlinn
- Founded: 1970
- County: Dublin
- Nickname: The Parish
- Colours: Royal Blue & White
- Grounds: Pearse Park
- Coordinates: 53°19′23.27″N 6°18′56.99″W

Playing kits
Standard colours

Senior Club Championships
	All Ireland	Leinster champions	Dublin champions
Hurling:	0	1	2
Camogie:	1	1	3

Crumlin GAA Club is a Gaelic Athletic Association club in Crumlin, Dublin, Ireland.

== History ==
Hurling was reportedly played in the Crumlin area from the 1740s. The village was bordered by an area of "common land", and a game between hurlers representing Leinster and Munster was recorded on Crumlin Common in 1748.

Crumlin Independents were set up in the early 1900s and lasted until 1935. St. Agnes’s Football Club was set up in 1932, to be followed by St. Columba’s Hurling Club in 1945. These two clubs catered for their respective games until the end of 1969, when they amalgamated to form Crumlin Hurling and Football Club. In late 1979 a new addition to the club took place when it was joined by Cúchulainn Camogie Club, which had operated in the area since 1967. In 2007 the Club was renamed Crumlin GAA Club.

== Facilities ==
Club playing pitches are located in Willie Pearse Park in Crumlin Village, and the clubhouse, which was opened in 1983 is located at Lorcan O'Toole Park.

== Camogie ==
Crumlin camogie club won the All-Ireland Senior Club Camogie Championship in 1985, defeating Athenry by 4-8 to 3-2 in the final. . The club was founded in 1966 by Phil Barry, Nuala Dunphy and Jeanne Quigley, and was originally known as the Cuchulainns Club. In 1980, the club joined up with the local Crumlin GAA club and, for some time, were known as Crumlin Cuchulainn. They club drew heavily on the players of the successful Assumption, Walkinstown, winners of Leinster post-primary schools titles.

== Honours ==
- Dublin Senior Hurling Championship Winners 1978, 1979
- Leinster Senior Club Hurling Championship Winners 1979
- Dublin Minor Football Championship Winners 1976
- Dublin Minor Hurling Championship Winners 1976
- Dublin Under 21 Hurling Championship Winners 1986, 1987
- Dublin Senior Camogie Championship Winners 1985, 1986, 1987
- Leinster Senior Club Camogie Championship Winners 1985
- All Ireland Senior Club Camogie Championship Winners 1985
- Dublin Junior Football Championship Winners 2006
- Dublin Junior Hurling Championship Winners 2006 and 2007
- Leinster League Division 2 Hurling Championship Winners 2011

Crumlin were the only Dublin team to win the Leinster Senior Club Hurling Championship until Cuala in 2016

== Notable members ==
- Brian McMahon, from Crumlin, received an All Star award in 1990.
- Jimmy Boggan, the former Dublin hurling manager, was awarded the inaugural Dublin Hurling Hall of Fame Award in 2007.
- Pat Ryan, from Crumlin, was a member of the Dublin football squad that defeated Galway in the 1983 All-Ireland Senior Football Championship final.
