= Ursula Grace =

Irish camogie player

Personal information
- Native name: Ursula Ní Ghrás (Irish)
- Born: Kilkenny, Ireland

Sport
- Sport: Camogie
- Position: forward
Club
- Years: Club
- St Paul’s
Club titles
- All-Ireland Titles: 3
Inter-county
- Years: County
- 1970-75: Kilkenny
Inter-county titles
- All-Irelands: 1

Ursula Grace is a former camogie player, scorer of the winning goal in the 1974 All Ireland final that resulted in a breakthrough victory for Kilkenny.

== Career ==
A schools star with Presentation Secondary School, Kilkenny in 1970, she won three All Ireland Club medals with St Paul’s in 1970, 1974 and 1976, and played in the 1977 final. She won a Leinster championship medal in 1975.
