= Anne Makemie Holden =

American figure (1702–1787/1788)

Anne Makemie Holden (née Makemie; 1702–c. 1787/1788) was an American landowner of the colonial period and early Republic. The younger daughter of clergyman Francis Makemie, the founder of Presbyterianism in what later became the United States, she was prominent in 18th-century Virginia society.

According to "reliable tradition", Anne Makemie's first marriage was to a "Mr. Blair"; following his death, she married Robert King (1689–c. May 1755). Her third and final marriage, which took place between 1760 and 1765, was to George Holden, who died in 1774. Reportedly "very patriotic" during the American Revolutionary War, and refusing the British militia entry into her residence, she inherited much of her father's land and businesses following his death in 1708.

Having outlived both her parents and her sister, she died between November 15, 1787 and January 29, 1788. She bequeathed a mahogany desk — the "only known relic of the Makemie family" — to her pastor Reverend Samuel McMaster, as well as a hundred pounds to ministerial funds and some one hundred and twenty English books to her third husband's family. She bequeathed a tract of land to each of four male relatives, so that they could vote for "real friends to the American Independence" come election time. By the time of her death, she was apparently estranged from her paternal relatives.

She had no children and is buried next to her father at the Makemie Monument Park in Accomack County, Virginia. The Daily News Leader described her as "an esteemed member of her community and a champion of the cause of American independence".

She is among the 230 women honored in the Virginia Women's Monument at the Capitol Square in Richmond, Virginia.
