= Ann Carroll =

Personal information
- Native name: Áine Ní Chearbhall (Irish)
- Born: County Tipperary, Ireland

Sport
- Sport: Camogie
- Position: full back, full forward
Clubs
- Years: Club
- St Patrick’s, Glengoole & St Paul’s
Club titles
- All-Ireland Titles: 6
Inter-county
- Years: County
- Tipperary, Kilkenny
Inter-county titles
- All-Irelands: 2

Ann Carroll is a camogie player. twice an All Ireland inter-county medalist and the outstanding personality in the first decade of the history of the All-Ireland Senior Club Camogie Championship winning medals with both St Patrick’s, Glengoole from Tipperary and St Paul’s from Kilkenny. She played inter-county camogie for both Tipperary and Kilkenny and Interprovincial camogie for both Munster and Leinster.

== Tipperary career ==
She played senior inter-county and inter-provincial Gael Linn Cup campogie while still at school in St Brigid's, Callan, with whom she won three Stuart Cup medals and played in five consecutive secondary schools Leinster championships.

She won her first Interprovincial medal in 1963, scored a dramatic winning point for Munster in the 1964 Gael Linn Cup final, and won a third with Munster again in 1966.

The star of UCD’s Ashbourne Cup winning team in 1966, she scored 1–4 in Dublin’s 3–5 to 2–4 victory over Cork in the final and ten of UCD’s 17 goals against Queen’s University in the semi-final.

She was Tipperary camogie player of the year in 1966. She won two All Ireland club medals with St Patrick’s, Glengoole in 1965 and 1966

== Kilkenny career ==
When her family moved to Kilkenny she won four more All Ireland club medals with St Paul’s in 1969, 1970–1, 1974-5 and 1976–7. In the 1968 Leinster club final she scored eight goals for St Paul’s against Ardclough.

With Kilkenny she won All Ireland senior medals in 1974 and 1976.

She won three more Interprovincial medals in 1970, 1971 and 1972.

== Ulster ==
She played in goal for Donegal in the 1980 junior championship.

== Other activities ==
In 1971 she was founding editor of the first magazine to be dedicated to camogie. IN 1977 with Mary Moran she was co-author of the first camogie coaching manual.

== Trophy ==
In the absence of a trophy for the All Ireland club championship, her father Bill donated the Bill Carroll Cup which is competed for annually by Ireland’s leading camogie clubs.
