= Teresa O'Neill =

Irish camogie player

Personal information
- Native name: Treasa Uí Néill (Irish)
- Born: Kilkenny, Ireland

Sport
- Sport: Camogie
Clubs*
Years	Club	Apps (scores)
1972-1987	St Paul's & Shamrocks	?
Inter-county**
Years	County	Apps (scores)
	Kilkenny	?
- * club appearances and scores correct as of (16:31, 30 June 2010 (UTC)). **Inter County team apps and scores correct as of (16:31, 30 June 2010 (UTC)).

Teresa O'Neill is a former camogie player, captain of the Kilkenny All Ireland Camogie Championship winning team in 1974, the first for the county at senior level. She won further All Ireland senior medals in 1976, 1977 and 1981. and captained Kilkenny to victory in the 1982 National Camogie League.

== Career ==
One of the product of the new All Ireland colleges championship of 1969 with Presentation Secondary School, Kilkenny she won club championship medals with St Paul's in 1969, 1970, 1974 and 1976.
