= St Paul's Camogie Club =

Gaelic games club in County Kilkenny, Ireland

- Naomh Pól
- Founded: 1963
- County: Kilkenny
- Colours: White with yellow trim
- Grounds: St John’s Park and Larchfield

Senior Club Championships
	All Ireland	Leinster champions	Kilkenny champions
Camogie:	8	13	25

Playing colours
- Full name: St Paul's Camogie Club

St Paul's is a former camogie club based in Kilkenny city, Ireland, one of the most successful in the history of the game. It won the All Ireland club championship in 1968, 1969, 1970, 1974, 1976, 1987, 1988, and 1989.

== Background ==
The St Paul's camogie club was formed in 1963 by John Fennelly, Mick Kenny, Jimmy Morrissey and Dick Cassin. The club is the most successful in the history of the All-Ireland Senior Club Camogie Championship with a total of eight victories in 1968, 1969, 1970, 1974, 1976, 1987, 1988 and 1989 They won further Leinster titles in 1966, 1973, 1977, 1986, 1990 . One of the first specialist camogie clubs in Kilkenny, the club was founded in 1963, and although based out of Kilkenny city, fielded players from all around the county. The club played its matches originally in St John's Park and later in Larchfield.

== Notable players ==
Five players won National Player of the Year awards: Angela Downey, Liz Neary, Bridie Martin, Ann Downey and Breda Holmes. Mary Fennelly was elected President of the Camogie Association in 1982 and Jo Golden served as secretary of the Camogie Association.

== Honours ==
- All-Ireland Senior Club Camogie Championships: (8) 1968, 1969, 1970, 1974, 1976, 1987, 1988, 1989
- Leinster Senior Club Camogie Championships: (13) 1966, 1968, 1969, 1970, 1973, 1974, 1976, 1977, 1986, 1987, 1988, 1989, 1990
- Kilkenny Senior Camogie Championshipa (25) 1965, 1966, 1967, 1968, 1969, 1970, 1971, 1972, 1973, 1974, 1975, 1976, 1977, 1978, 1979, 1980, 1982, 1983, 1984, 1985, 1986, 1987, 1988, 1989, 1990
