= Breda Holmes =

Irish camogie player

Personal information
- Native name: Bríd Nic Thomáis (Irish)
- Born: Kilkenny, Ireland

Sport
- Sport: Camogie
- Position: Full forward
Club*
| Years | Club | Apps (scores) |
| | St Paul’s | ? |
Inter-county**
| Years | County | Apps (scores) |
| | Kilkenny | ? |
Inter-county titles
- All-Irelands: 7
- * club appearances and scores correct as of (16:31, 30 June 2010 (UTC)). **Inter County team apps and scores correct as of (16:31, 30 June 2010 (UTC)).

Breda Holmes is a former camogie player, winner of the B+I Star of the Year award in 1987 and seven All Ireland medals in succession between 1984 and 1991, celebrating the seventh by scoring the match-turning goal from Ann Downey’s sideline ball against Cork in the 1991 final.

== Career ==
She captained Carysfort Training College in their 1984 Purcell Cup campaign and won six All Ireland club medals with St Paul’s camogie club, based in Kilkenny city.
