= Úna Uí Phuirséil =

Irish sports administrator

17th President of the Camogie Association
- In office 1976–1979
- Succeeded by: Mary Moran

Personal details
- Born: Agnes Hourigan; 20 March 1919 Ballingarry, County Limerick
- Died: 1 December 1983 (aged 64) Dublin, Ireland
- Spouse: Padraig Puirséil (1914–79)
- Children: Anne, Dick,John, Padraig.
- Profession: Teacher

Úna Uí Phuirséil (Agnes Hourigan-Purcell) was the 17th president of the Camogie Association. Born Agnes Hourigan in Ballingarry, County Limerick, she had three brothers, Dan, Sean, Fr Jack Hourigan, and four sisters [including Maisie and Ellen].

== Introduction to Camogie ==
She played initially for Limerick and won an Ashbourne Cup with University College Dublin alongside another future camogie presidential candidate Inez O’Kelly and an All-Ireland medal with Dublin in 1938 and later wrote on camogie for the Irish Press under her own name and simultaneously under the nom-de-plume "‘Taobh Line"‘ for the Irish independent.

She became president of the colleges camogie council, CCLA, chair of Leinster Colleges Council (1964-73), and secretary of the Leinster Council.

== Pádraig Puirséil ==
In 1943 she married Pádraig Puirséil (1914–79), novelist and GAA correspondent of the Irish Press from 1970 to 1979, and author of the GAA history: "‘The GAA in Its Time"‘ based on Puirséal's research and articles about the history of the GAA, was edited by Padraig's sister Mary (1906–91), also a writer and archivist, and published posthumously (1982), Their house in Kenilworth Park was an open house for GAA and camogie people.

== Presidency ==
During her presidency in 1977 Comhairle na mBunscoileanna was set up with former president Síghle Nic an Ultaigh as chair. The first Senior National League Final was played and won by a Tipperary team which included as one of its members a future camogie association president Liz Howard.

At the time of her death in 1983 she was treasurer of Árd Chómhairle, vice chair of the All Ireland Colleges Council, and PRO for both Leinster camogie board and Dublin County Camogie Board.

== Legacy ==
Corn Uí Phuirséil, the colleges trophy, the Féile na nGael camogie trophy and the Purcell Cup awarded for the third level colleges second division competition, are all named in honour of her and her husband.
