= Liz Neary =

Kilkenny Camogie player (born 1951)

Personal information
- Native name: Eibhlín Ní Náraigh (Irish)
- Born: Kilkenny, Ireland

Sport
- Sport: Camogie
- Position: Full-back
Clubs
- Years: Club
- St. Paul's; Austin Stacks
Inter-county
- Years: County
- 1968-1987: Kilkenny
Inter-county titles
- All-Irelands: 7
- NHL: 5

Liz Neary (born 1951 in Kilkenny, Ireland) is a retired Irish sportsperson. She played camogie at various times with her local clubs St. Paul's and Austin Stacks and was a member of the Kilkenny senior inter-county team from 1970 until 1987. Neary is regarded as one of the greatest players of all-time.

In a senior inter-county career that lasted for nineteen years she won seven All-Ireland medals, five National League medals and five Gael Linn Interprovincial medals. With her two clubs St. Paul's and Austin Stack's she collected a huge haul of twenty-one county titles and six All-Ireland club medals.

Neary was also presented with a number of personal awards during her career. In 1981 and 1986 she was awarded the B&I Player of the Year Award. In 2004, she was named on the Camogie Team of the Century.

== Biography ==
Liz Neary was born in Kilkenny in 1951. She was educated locally and later attended the Presentation Secondary School, Kilkenny. It was here that her camogie skills were first developed. Neary captained the school to the All-Ireland Colleges' title in 1970.

== Playing career ==
=== Club ===
Neary played most of her club camogie with St Paul's Camogie Club in Kilkenny. By the time the club disbanded in the early 1990s, she had already collected twenty county titles. During this period Neary also won six All-Ireland club titles, the first of which came in 1970. She won the last of her six All-Ireland club medals nineteen years later in 1989. Downey later joined the Austin Stacks club in Dublin and went on to win another county medal.

=== Inter-county ===
Neary was still in secondary school when she first played senior camogie with Kilkenny in 1968. By 1972, she was a key member of the team and she lined out in her first championship decider. Cork provided the opposition again and it was the Cork team that won on a 2-5 to 1-4 scoreline.

Two years later, in 1974, Kilkenny were back in the All-Ireland final and, once again, Cork were the opponents. Both sides ended level with Kilkenny scoring 3-8 and Cork scoring 4-5. The replay took place a few weeks later. Kilkenny won by 3-3 to 1-5 and Neary captured her first All-Ireland Senior Camogie Championship medal.

Kilkenny surrendered their All-Ireland crown in 1975, however, Neary lined out in a third All-Ireland final in 1976. On that occasion Kilkenny took on Dublin. Kilkenny won by 0-6 to 1-2. It was Neary's second All-Ireland medal.

In 1977, Neary was a key player in Kilkenny’s quest for back-to-back All-Ireland titles. That year she lined out in the All-Ireland final once again. Wexford, the winners of the championship two years earlier, provided the opposition. Kilkenny won on a score line of 3-4 to 1-3. It was Neary’s third All-Ireland medal.

Kilkenny went into decline for the next few years; however, Neary added a National Camogie League medal to her collection in 1980. It was Kilkenny's first title in that competition. In 1981, Neary was appointed captain of the Kilkenny senior camogie team. That year Kilkenny met Cork in the championship decider, with both sides ended with 3-9 apiece. The replay was more conclusive, with Kilkenny winning that game by 1-9 to 0-7 and Neary collecting a fourth All-Ireland medal. She also lifted the O'Duffy Cup. She was later named as the B&I Player of the Year.

Neary won a second National League medal with Kilkenny in 1982. Three years later in 1985 she collected a third winners' medal in that competition. Kilkenny later qualified for another All-Ireland final. Dublin provided the opposition in the final which ended with a 0-13 to 1-5 victory for Kilkenny, and earning her a fifth All-Ireland medal.

1986 saw Neary being appointed captain again. That year she guided Kilkenny to a second consecutive All-Ireland final. For the second year in-a-row Dublin provided the opposition, however, once again the result was the same. Kilkenny won the game by 2-12 to 2-3. It was Neary's sixth All-Ireland title while she also joined a club of players that had captained their county to more than one All-Ireland victory. Neary was later named B&I Player of the Year.

In 1987, Neary added a fourth National League medal to her collection after Kilkenny beat Dublin in yet another national final. Later that year Kilkenny qualified for the All-Ireland final. It was an historic occasion as Downey's side were hoping to capture a third All-Ireland title in-a-row, something that Kilkenny had never achieved. Cork stood in their way. The full-time score of 3-10 to 1-7 gave Kilkenny victory in the final and gave Neary a seventh All-Ireland medal. She retired from inter-county camogie following this victory.

=== Provincial ===
Neary also lined out with Leinster in the Gael Linn sponsored inter-provincial camogie championship. She won five inter-provincial camogie titles with her province.

== Retirement ==
In 2004, she was named in the right corner-back position on a special team picked to celebrate the centenary of the Camogie Association of Ireland.

== Sources ==
- Corry, Eoghan, The GAA Book of Lists (Hodder Headline Ireland, 2005).
- Donegan, Des, The Complete Handbook of Gaelic Games (DBA Publications Limited, 2005).
- Fullam, Brendan, Captains of the Ash, (Wolfhound Press, 2002).

Preceded by Mary Geany (Cork)	All-Ireland Senior Camogie Final winning captain 1981	Succeeded by Pat Linehan (Cork)
Preceded by Bridie McGarry (Kilkenny)	All-Ireland Senior Camogie Final winning captain 1986	Succeeded by Bridie McGarry (Kilkenny)
