= Angela Downey =

Irish camogie player (born 1957)

Personal information
- Native name: Aingeal Nic Giolla Domhnaigh-de Brún (Irish)
- Born: Kilkenny, Ireland

Sport
- Sport: Camogie
- Position: Corner-forward
Clubs
- Years: Club
- St Paul's and Lisdowney
Inter-county
- Years: County
- 1970–1995: Kilkenny
Inter-county titles
- All-Irelands: 12

Angela Downey-Browne (born 1957, Kilkenny) is a retired Irish sportsperson. She played camogie with her local clubs, St Paul's based in Kilkenny city and Lisdowney, and was a member of the Kilkenny senior inter-county team from 1970 to 1995. Downey is regarded as the greatest player in the history of the game.

In a senior inter-county career that 25 years she won twelve All-Ireland medals, thirteen Leinster medals and eight National League medals. With her two clubs St. Paul's and Lisdowney she collected 22 county titles and 6 All-Ireland club medals.

Downey was presented with personal awards during her career. In 1977 she was honoured with the B&I Player of the Year Award. Almost a decade later in 1986 Downey became only the third camogie player ever to be presented with a Texaco Award. In 2004 her reputation as the greatest player of all-time was further cemented when she was named on the Camogie Team of the Century.

== Biography ==
Angela Downey was born in Kilkenny in 1957. From a young age camogie was a central part of her life, as well as the life of her twin sister Ann. Their father Shem Downey won an All-Ireland medal with Kilkenny in 1947. Angela started playing camogie when she was nine, she would go on to become one of the best players in the history of the game.

== Playing career ==
=== Club ===
Downey played most of her club camogie with the St Paul’s Camogie Club, Kilkenny. When the club disbanded in the early 1990s she had already collected 20 county titles. During this period Downey won six All-Ireland club titles, the first of which came in 1970. She won the last of her six All-Ireland club medals nineteen years later in 1989. She later joined the Lisdowney club and enjoyed further success. Together with her twin-sister Ann she won a further two county medals.

=== Inter-county ===
Downey was only 13 when she first played senior camogie with Kilkenny in 1970. Two years later, in 1972, she was still a member of the team when she lined out in her first championship decider. Cork was the opposition and it was Cork who secured a 2–5 to 1–4 victory. Two years later, in 1974, Kilkenny were back in the All-Ireland final and, once again, Cork were the opponents. The game ended level with Kilkenny scoring 3–8 and Cork scoring 4–5. The replay took place a few weeks later, and it was another tight game. Kilkenny clinched the victory by 3–3 to 1–5 and Downey received her first All-Ireland medal.

Kilkenny surrendered their All-Ireland crown in 1975. Downey later lined out in a third All-Ireland final in 1976. On that occasion Kilkenny took on Dublin. Kilkenny were the winners by 0–6 to 1–2. It was Downey's second All-Ireland medal.

In 1977, Downey captained Kilkenny in their search for back-to-back All-Ireland titles. That year she guided her county to the All-Ireland final once again. Wexford, the winners of the championship two years earlier, provided the opposition. Kilkenny won on a score line of 3–4 to 1–3. Not only was it Downey's third All-Ireland medal but she collected the O'Duffy Cup. She was later chosen as the B&I Player of the Year.

Kilkenny went into decline for the next few years; however, Downey added a National Camogie League medal to her collection in 1980. It was Kilkenny's first title in that competition. In 1981, Kilkenny met Cork in the championship decider. Both sides ended the game with 3–9 apiece. In the replay, Kilkenny won by 1–9 to 0–7 with Downey collecting a fourth All-Ireland medal.

All-Ireland success was slow in coming over the next few years; however, Downey won a second National League medal with Kilkenny in 1982. Three years later in 1985 she collected a third winners' medal in that competition. Kilkenny later qualified for another All-Ireland final. Dublin provided the opposition on that occasion. The final ended with a 0–13 to 1–5 victory for Kilkenny, giving her a fifth All-Ireland medal.

1986 saw Kilkenny line out in a second consecutive All-Ireland final, her sixth in all. For the second year in-a-row Dublin were the opposition, once again the result was the same. Kilkenny won the game by 2–12 to 2–3. It was Downey's sixth All-Ireland title. She was later presented with a Texaco Award, becoming only the third camogie player ever to win one.

In 1987, Downey won a fourth National League medal, after Kilkenny beat Dublin in another national final. Later that year Kilkenny qualified for the All-Ireland final. Downey's side were hoping to capture a third All-Ireland title in-a-row, something Kilkenny had never achieved, Cork was the opponent. The full-time score of 3–10 to 1–7 gave Kilkenny the victory and Downey a seventh All-Ireland medal.

In 1988, Downey captained Kilkenny. She began the year by winning a fifth National League medal before later guiding her county to the All-Ireland final, against Cork. Kilkenny won by 4–11 to 3–8. It was Downey's eighth All-Ireland medal and she had captained the county to more than one All-Ireland victory, a rare feat.

In 1989, Cork were beaten in the National League final to give Kilkenny and Downey a sixth title in that competition. The subsequent All-Ireland final was a repeat of the championship deciders of the previous two years. Cork wanted to avenge those defeats and avoid losing a third All-Ireland final in-a-row, while Kilkenny were hoping to add another consecutive title to their collection. The result saw Kilkenny win by 3–10 to 2–6, giving Downey a ninth All-Ireland medal.

At the start of 1990, the county won a fourth consecutive National League title. It was Downey's seventh medal in that competition. The subsequent All-Ireland final saw Kilkenny take on Wexford for the first time since 1977. Kilkenny dominated the game and a final score of 1–14 to 0–7 gave Downey her tenth All-Ireland medal, a victory which made her joint third with Kay Ryder on the all-time list of leading All-Ireland medal holders.

In 1991, Downey was captain of her native-county. The year started badly for Kilkenny, when its run of success in the National League came to an end. Cork defeated Kilkenny in the final of that competition, denying the county a fifth league title in-a-row. Downey's side later qualified for the All-Ireland final. Cork were the opposition once again. Kilkenny won the day by 3–8 to 0–10. Kilkenny won a seventh All-Ireland title in-a-row. It was Downey's eleventh All-Ireland medal overall. She lifted the O'Duffy Cup for the third time. In 1993 Downey won her eighth National League medal. It was 1994, however, before Downey lined out in her next All-Ireland final. Wexford, Kilkenny's nearest neighbours, were the opposition. A final score of 2–11 to 0–8 gave Downey her twelfth All-Ireland medal on the field of play. On the same day her sister Ann collected her eleventh medal. Downey was subsequently named Camogie Player of the Year.

In 1995, Downey lined out in her final championship season with Kilkenny. It was twenty-five years since she made her debut at 13. For the final time she lined out to play on All-Ireland final day, Cork were the opposition. Cork emerged victorious by 4–8 to 2–10, thus, denying Downey a thirteenth All-Ireland medal. Downey retired from inter-county camogie following this defeat.

=== Provincial ===
Downey also lined out with Leinster in the Gael Linn sponsored inter-provincial camogie championship. In all she won ten inter-provincial titles with her province.

== Retirement ==
At the time of her retirement, Downey's haul of twelve All-Ireland medals was surpassed by only two other players, Úna O'Connor and Kathleen Mills. In 2004, Downey was named in the left corner-forward position on a special team picked to celebrate the centenary of the Camogie Association of Ireland. Downey boycotted the presentation in protest at the absence of her sister Ann from the team. Angela is a teacher at Grennan College in Thomastown, County Kilkenny.

Achievements
Preceded by Mary Fennelly (Kilkenny)	All-Ireland Senior Camogie Final winning captain 1977	Succeeded by Nancy O'Driscoll (Cork)
Preceded by Bridie McGarry (Kilkenny)	All-Ireland Senior Camogie Final winning captain 1988	Succeeded by Ann Downey (Kilkenny)
Preceded by Breda Holmes (Kilkenny)	All-Ireland Senior Camogie Final winning captain 1991	Succeeded by Sandy Fitzgibbon (Cork)

== Sources ==
- Corry, Eoghan, The GAA Book of Lists (Hodder Headline Ireland, 2005). ISBN 9780340896952
- Donegan, Des, The Complete Handbook of Gaelic Games (DBA Publications Limited, 2005). ISBN 9780955111501
- Fullam, Brendan, Captains of the Ash, (Wolfhound Press, 2002). ISBN 9780863279003
