= Camogie Association =

Governing body for the sport of camogie

Cumann Camogaiochta
- Formation: 1904; 122 years ago
- Type: Sports federation
- Headquarters: Dublin, Ireland
- Members: 550 clubs, 85,000 members
- President: Brian Molloy
- Website: camogie.ie

The Camogie Association (Irish: An Cumann Camógaíochta, formerly Irish: Cumann Camógaíochta na nGael) organises and promotes the sport of camogie in Ireland and around the world. The association has close ties with the Gaelic Athletic Association, but is still a separate organisation.

== History ==
The Camogie Association was founded in 8 North Frederick St, Dublin on 25 February 1904, with Máire Ní Chinnéide as president. In 1911, it was reconstituted as Cualacht Luithchleas na mBan Gaedheal ("Gaelic Athletic Company of Women") at a meeting organised by Seaghán Ua Dúbhtaigh at 25 Rutland Square (now Parnell Square), Dublin. It was revived in 1923 and the first congress held on 25 April 1925, when over 100 delegates gathered in Conarchy's Hotel, Parnell Square. It was reconstituted again in 1939 as Cumann Camogaiochta na nGael. For a period in the 1930s it organised women's athletics events. A breakaway Cualacht Luithchleas na mBan Gaedheal continued in existence during 1939–51 as clubs in Cork, Dublin, Kildare, Meath and Wicklow disaffiliated in a series of disputes, largely over whether male officials should be allowed to hold office and whether players of ladies' hockey should be allowed to play camogie. The last of these disputes was not resolved until 1951. The decision to change the playing rules from 12-a-side to 15-a-side teams and to use the larger GAA-style field led to an increase of affiliations after 1999 from 400 clubs to 540 a decade later.

=== 2025 "Skorts rule" controversy ===
In May 2025, the Camogie Association's uniform policy requiring players to wear a skort (a skirt-short hybrid) faced renewed scrutiny after players from Dublin and Kilkenny staged a coordinated protest before the Leinster Senior Championship semi-final by wearing shorts instead of skorts. Match officials informed both teams that the game would not go ahead unless they changed into the mandated attire, and the players ultimately complied under protest.

The protest highlighted ongoing player dissatisfaction with the rule. A 2025 Gaelic Players Association survey indicated that 70% of inter-county camogie players find skorts uncomfortable, and 83% want the option to wear shorts. Dublin captain Aisling Maher described the incident as "a career low," stating, "over 60 players ready to participate in a championship match in shorts were informed that the game would be called off unless everyone switched to skorts." After the match, Maher added "I cherish this game, yet I am tired of being mandated to wear a skort that is both uncomfortable and impractical... Why are female athletes still needing to advocate for the right to wear shorts while competing at the top level of their sport?"

Players seeking change to the skorts rule cite discomfort, anxiety about exposure during play, and concerns over inappropriate or intrusive photography, especially during tackles or falls. Additional worries include period leaks and the rule acting as a barrier for young girls’ participation. Advocates argue that allowing shorts would better support player welfare and inclusion.

Although motions to allow shorts were rejected at the 2024 Camogie Congress, meaning the rule cannot be formally reconsidered until 2027, the Association’s governing body, Ard Chomhairle, does have the authority to grant a temporary derogation from the rule in exceptional circumstances if it is deemed to be in the best interests of the sport. Such a temporary exemption would not constitute a permanent rule change, which would still require Congress approval in 2027.

Unlike in Ireland, where the Camogie Association mandates skorts, camogie players in the United States (USGAA) and across Europe (Gaelic Games Europe) are permitted to wear shorts in competitive matches, and there is no requirement for skorts in their official regulations. This difference has been noted in international coverage.

On 22 May 2025, a special congress of the Camogie Association was held and within 30 minutes had voted to overturn the ban on shorts. The motion passed with a 98% yes vote. Players now have the option to either wear skorts or shorts.

== Constitution ==
A new constitution in 2010 shortened the name to An Cumann Camogaíochta and accepted the English title "Camogie Association" on official documents for the first time, reflecting the increased presence of the game in Europe, North America, Asia and Australasia.

== Development plan ==
The game's National Development Plan 2010–2015, entitled Our Game, Our Passion, aims to increase the club base of the association from 540 clubs to 750 by 2015. Targets include:

- 36 new clubs to be established in existing hurling sections of GAA clubs by mid-2011;
- 15 new clubs to be established in counties hosting féile na nGael by 2015;
- three new clubs to be established in each of Fermanagh, Leitrim and Sligo by 2014;
- 14 new clubs to be established in Donegal, Mayo, Kerry and Monaghan by 2015;
- 17 new clubs to be established in Cavan, Louth, Roscommon, Carlow and Laois by 2015;
- five new clubs to be established in each of 19 other counties by 2015;
- 25 foundation-level courses and 4 level-one courses with aim of qualifying 400 coaches each year;
- numbers of players aged 14–19 to be increased by 20% by 2015;
- female attendance at cúl camps to be increased 10% year on year to 2012;
- county boards in Fermanagh, Leitrim, Longford and Sligo.

== International development ==
An international games development strategy was commenced in 2010, with camogie established as part of the Continental Youth Games in the United States and a target of three teams from Great Britain participating in Féile na nGael by 2015.

== Competitions ==
The Camogie Association organises All-Ireland Championships at Senior, Intermediate, "Premier Junior", Junior A, Junior B, Minor A, Minor B, and Minor C, and Under-16 A, B and C level. There is an All Ireland Club Championship at senior, intermediate and junior level, a National League an inter-provincial Gael Linn Cup at senior and junior level, inter-collegiate Ashbourne and Purcell cups and a programme of All-Ireland championships at secondary schools senior and junior levels.

== President ==
The president of the association is elected by the sport's annual congress, in modern times for a three-year term, a year in advance. Early presidents had longer terms.

=== Past presidents ===
- 1905 Máire Ní Chinnéide (Dublin)
- 1911 Elizabeth Burke-Plunkett (Dublin)
- 1923 Máire Gill (Dublin)
- 1941 Agnes O'Farrelly (Dublin)
- 1942 Lil Kirby (Cork)
- 1945 Agnes Hennessy (Cavan)
- 1946 Síle Horgan (Cork)
- 1949 Síghle Nic an Ultaigh (Down)
- 1953 Lucy Cullen-Byrne (Mrs CM Byrne) (Wicklow)
- 1956 Lily Spence (Antrim)
- 1959 Eilish Redmond (Dublin)
- 1962 Chris O'Connell (Limerick)
- 1965 Lil O'Grady (Cork)
- 1968 Rosina MacManus (Antrim)
- 1971 Nell McCarthy (Dublin)
- 1973 Nancy Murray (Antrim)
- 1976 Úna Uí Phuirséil (Dublin)
- 1979 Mary Moran (Cork)
- 1982 Mary Fennelly (Kilkenny)
- 1985 Mary Lynch (Monaghan)
- 1988 Mary O'Callaghan (Cork)
- 1991 Brídín Uí Mhaolagáin (Dublin)
- 1994 Belle O'Loughlin (Down)
- 1997 Phyllis Breslin (Dublin)
- 2000 Pat Rafferty (Dublin)
- 2003 Miriam O'Callaghan (Offaly)
- 2006 Liz Howard (Tipperary)
- 2009 Joan O'Flynn (Cork)
- 2012 Aileen Lawlor (Westmeath)
- 2015 Catherine Neary (Kilkenny)
- 2018 Katherine Woods (Armagh)
- 2021 Hilda Breslin (Kildare)
- 2024 Brian Molloy (Galway)

Therese Condon from Ashbourne was president of the breakaway Cualacht Luithchleas na mBan Gaedheal Camóguidheacht Comhdháil in 1939–41. Maggie Dunne (Wexford) was president of the breakaway National Camogie Association in 1949.
