= Ann Downey =

Irish camogie player (born 1957)

Personal information
- Native name: Áine Nic Giolla Domhnaigh (Irish)
- Born: 1957 (age 68–69) Kilkenny, Ireland

Sport
- Sport: Camogie
- Position: Centre field
Clubs
- Years: Club
- St Paul’s and Lisdowney
Inter-county
- Years: County
- Kilkenny
Inter-county titles
- All-Irelands: 12

Ann Downey (born 1957 in Castlecomer, Ireland) is a retired camogie player, winner of 12 All Ireland inter-county medals, captaining the team in 1989 and 1994, and seven All-Ireland club medals with St Paul's and Lisdowney (1) – one more than her sister Angela who was suspended for one final.

== Family background ==
Her father, Shem Downey won an All-Ireland medal with Kilkenny in 1947. Her twin sister Angela was cited in 2004 as the greatest player in the history of camogie.

== Career ==
She went to school in Castlecomer before joining her sister in St Brigid’s in Callan. During their careers in the 1970s and '80s Kilkenny completely dominated the game, including winning seven senior All-Irelands in-a-row from 1985 to 1991.

== Awards ==
She was recipient of the Player of the year award in 1991 on her own account and jointly with her sister Angela in 1986 and 1989. In 2010 the Downey sisters received a Lifetime Achievement in Sport award.

== Management ==
In May 2007 she took over management of the Kilkenny camogie team, becoming only the second female manager in senior inter-county camogie, after Wexford's Stellah Sinnott.

== Team of the Century ==
In 2004 when she was overlooked for selection on the Camogie team of the century, her sister Angela snubbed the ceremony.

== Other sports ==
A notable golfer, she also won Irish Veterans' Championship over-40 women's squash singles in 1998.
