= Bridie McGarry =

Kilkenny Camogie player

Personal information
- Native name: Bríd Nic Fhearraigh (Irish)
- Born: Kilkenny, Ireland

Sport
- Sport: Camogie
- Position: Right half back
Inter-county
- Years: County
- 1972-1990: Kilkenny
Inter-county titles
- All-Irelands: 9
- All Stars: 2004 Team of Century

Bridie Martin-McGarry from Kilkenny is a former camogie player selected on the camogie team of the century in 2004, and winner of nine All Ireland medals.

== Background and early career ==
She first played Camogie when she went to Presentation Secondary School, Kilkenny where she won an All Ireland Senior Colleges title in 1969. She played with Thornbrack and Lisdowney before winning several county championships and three club All Ireland medals with St Paul’s.

== Inter-county ==
She first played with Kilkenny senior team in 1972 and went on to win nine All Ireland medals in what was the county’s most successful period in the game to date. She was captain in 1985 and again in 1987. She won seven National League medals with Kilkenny and eight Gael Linn Cup inter-provincial medals with Leinster. She later became involved in coaching the Development Squad in Kilkenny and is also a referee.

== Awards ==
Apart from her selection on the camogie team of the century in 2004, she won B&I Player of the Year in 1976, won the 1976 Kilkenny Sports Star award and an Irish Nationwide "Women in Sport" Award.

== Citation ==
Her team of the century citation read: "she made Camogie look easy, her range of skills a joy to watch. Her dainty physique belied her strength under the dropping ball. Always distributing the ball to best advantage she was an attacking centre-back."

== Other sports ==
A talented soccer player she was chosen to play for Ireland but had to withdraw due to the clash of fixtures between Camogie and soccer.
