= All-Ireland Senior Club Camogie Championship 2026 =

Inter-county club camogie tournament

Tournament details
- Sponsor: AIB
- Dates: 25 October 2026 – 13 December 2026
- Teams: 14

The 2026 All-Ireland Senior Club Camogie Championship sponsored by AIB is the 63rd staging of the All-Ireland Senior Club Camogie Championship, the Camogie Association's premier inter-county club camogie tournament. The championship is scheduled to run from 25 October 2026 to 13 December 2026.

Athenry from Galway were the defending champion. However, they lost in the Semi-Final of the Galway Senior Camogie Championship.

== Participating teams ==
Team	County	Number of titles		
Team	County	All-Ireland	Province	County
Sarsfields	Galway	4	–	9
Dicksboro	Kilkenny	1	2	5
St Vincent's	Dublin	0	4	18
Shinrone	Offaly	0	0	9
St Martin's	Wexford	0	1	5
St Finbarr's	Cork	0	1	4
Truagh-Clonlara	Clare	0	1	3
Thurles Sarsfields	Tipperary	0	0	2
Clanmaurice	Kerry	0	0	?
Newcastle West	Limerick	0	0	6
Gailltir	Waterford	0	0	10+
Swatragh	Derry	0	5	28
Clonduff	Down	0	0	12
Dunloy	Antrim	0	2	12

== Provincial Champions overview ==
	Connacht	Leinster	Munster	Ulster
Senior	Sarsfields		St Finbarr's	Dunloy
Intermediate	Liam Mellows		Boherlahan Dualla	
Junior	–	Crookedwood	Templeglantine	Ballinderry
Junior B	–	St Kevin's	–	Tullysaran

== Galway Senior Club Camogie Championship ==
The Connacht Senior Club Championship is not played due to the dominance of the teams from Galway in this province. Accordingly, the champion of the Galway Senior Championship takes this place automatically.

The 2026 Galway Club Championship final was contested between Sarsfields and Oranmore-Maree. Sarsfields won by 3-17 to 0-10.

== Leinster Senior Club Camogie Championship ==
Semi-Finals		Final
Dicksboro (Kilkenny)	0-13
St Vincents (Dublin)	0-10	Dicksboro (Kilkenny)	1-10
Shinrone (Offaly)	0-07	St Martin's (Wexford)	1-07
St Martin's (Wexford)	3-24

=== Leinster semi-finals ===
7 November 2026 Semi-Final	Shinrone (Offaly)	0-07 – 3-24	St Martin's (Wexford)
14:00				Venue: Shinrone
	Gls: G Egan 0-5, C Cleary 0-2	Report	Gls: C O'Connor 0-10, A O'Connor, 2-3, C Foxe 0-4, L Firman 1-0, L Whelan 0-3, L Bolger 0-2, L Goggins, E Codd 0-1 each

7 November 2026 Semi-Final	Dicksboro (Kilkenny)	0-13 – 0-10	St Vincents (Dublin)
14:00				Venue: Dicksboro GAA
	Gls: A Prendergast 0-6, R Kelly, O Hanrick 0-2 each, R Dowling, A Clifford, A McHardy 0-1 each	Report	Gls: A Maher 0-6, C McKenna 0-2, A Lambe, D Smith 0-1 each

=== Leinster final ===
22 November 2026 Final	Dicksboro (Kilkenny)	1–10 – 1–07	St Martin's (Wexford)
15:30				Venue: Chadwicks Wexford Park

== Munster Senior Club Camogie Championship ==
The draw was published on 9 October 2026.

Preliminary Round
St. Finbar's (Cork)	4-10
Truagh-Clonlara (Clare)	1-12
Clanmaurice (Kerry)	1-16 (a.e.t)
Newcastle West (Limerick)	1-13

Semi-Finals
St. Finbar's (Cork)	1-17
Thurles Sarfields (Tipperary)	1-10
Clanmaurice (Kerry)	1-08
Gailltir (Waterford)	2-13

Final
St. Finbar's (Cork)	2-13
Gailltir (Waterford)	2-09

=== Munster preliminary round ===
25 October 2026 Preliminary Round	St. Finbar's (Cork)	4-10 – 1-12	Truagh-Clonlara (Clare)
13:30				Venue: MTU Cork
	Gls: O Cahalane 3-2, K Wall, S McCartan 0-4 each, N Olden 1-0.	Report	Gls: R Begley 0-6 f, A O'Loughlin 1-1, E Kelly 0-2, H Horgan, L Foley (f), N Ryan 0-1 each.

25 October 2026 Preliminary Round	Clanmaurice (Kerry)	1-16 – 1-13 (a.e.t.)	Newcastle West (Limerick)
13:30				Venue: Lixnaw
	Gls: J Horgan (1-8, 5fs), A O’Sullivan (0-4), P Diggin (0-3fs), A Behan (0-1).	Report	Gls: R Delee (0-8, 7fs), H Horgan (1-1, 1-0 pen), K O’Leary (0-3), D Murphy (0-1).

This marked the first victory in the Munster Senior Championship for Clanmaurice.

=== Munster semi-finals ===
1 November 2026 Semi-Final	Thurles Sarfields (Tipperary)	1-10 – 1-17	St. Finbar's (Cork)
13:30				Venue: Tipperary Camogie Grounds
	Gls: Caoimhe Stakelum (0-8, 0-6f), Laura Loughnane (1-1), Aoife O’Dwyer (0-1)	Report	Gls: Sorcha McCartan (0-8, 0-5f), Wigginton Barrett (1-0), Ella Kate Wall (0-3), Liz O’Donovan (0-3), Aisling Shannon (0-1), Orlaith Cahalane (0-1), Eimear Hurley (0-1)

1 November 2026 Semi-Final	Gailltir (Waterford)	2-13 – 1-08	Clanmaurice (Kerry)
13:30				Venue: Ballygunner
	Gls: L Forrest (0-7, 6fs), A Fitzgerald (1-3), C Flynn (1-0), M Comerford, M Brennan and A O’Sullivan (f) (0-1 each	Report	Gls: P Diggin (1-4, 1-0 pen, 4fs), J Horgan (0-3, ’45, f), K Lynch (0-1)

=== Munster final ===
14 November 2026 Final	Gailltir (Waterford)	2-09 – 2-13	St. Finbar's (Cork)
				Venue: FBD Semple Stadium
	Gls: A Fitzgerald 1-2, E Fitzgerald 1-1, L Forrest 0-4 (0-3 f), A Ferguson, M Comerford 0-1 each.	Report	Gls: S McCartan 0-6, O Cahalane, E Wigginton Barrett 1-1 each, K Wall 0-3, L O’Donovan, N Olden 0-1 each.

== Ulster Senior Club Camogie Championship ==
Both Loughgiel and Slaughtneil who shared every Ulster Senior Camogie Championship since 2014 did not win their respective counties.

Semi-Finals		Final
Swatragh (Derry)	0-11
Clonduff (Down)	1-12	Clonduff (Down)	0-11
		Dunloy (Antrim)	1-10

=== Ulster semi-final ===
The semi-final was postponed to 1 November because of bad pitch conditions.

1 November 2026 Semi-Final	Swatragh (Derry)	0-11 – 1-12	Clonduff (Down)
13:00				Venue: Swatragh
	Gls: E Quinn 0-4fs, S Doherty 0-3, MT McCullagh 0-1, G McAtamney 0-1, C Conway 0-1	Report	Gls: SL Graffin 0-5, 4fs, B Fitzpatrick 1-1, P O’Hagan 0-2, O Gribben 0-1, C Byrne 0-1, T Cowan 0-1

=== Ulster final ===
7 November 2026 Final	Dunloy (Antrim)	1-10 – 0-11	Clonduff (Down)
13:00				Venue: Stewartstown Harps GFC
	Gls: É McAllister 1-6, 0-5fs, Caitlín Crawford 0-1, C Molloy 0-1, Á Magill 0-1, K Molloy 0-1	Report	Gls: P O’Hagan 0-8fs, SL Graffin 0-2, 1f, C McGilligan 0-1

== All-Ireland Senior Club Championship ==
Semi-Finals	Final
Dicksboro (Kilkenny)
Dunloy (Antrim)
St. Finbarr's (Cork)
Sarsfields (Galway)

== Top Scorers ==
Player	Club	Goals	Points	Total
S McCartan	St Finbarr's	0	18	18
O Cahalane	St Finbarr's	4	4	16
J Horgan	Clanmaurice	1	11	14
A Fitzgerald	Gailltir	2	5	11
L Forrest	Gailltir	0	11	11
P Diggin	Clanmaurice	1	7	10
P O’Hagan	Clonduff	0	10	10
C O'Connor	St Martin's	0	10	10
K Wall	St Finbarr's	0	10	10
É McAllister	Dunloy	1	6	9
A O'Connor	St Martin's	2	3	9

== Intermediate Championship ==
=== Connacht ===
14 November 2026 Connacht Final	Liam Mellows (Galway)	3-10 – 1-10	Oran (Roscommon)
14:00				Venue: Ballyloughane
		Report

=== Leinster ===
First Round
Mount Leinster Rangers (Carlow)	1-05
Camross (Laois)	0-06

Quarterfinals
Mount Leinster Rangers (Carlow)	0-12
Emeralds (Kilkenny)	3-09
Na Fianna (Meath)	0-08
Clonkill (Westmeath)	3-08
Knockananna (Wicklow)	2-14 (a.e.t)
Fr O`Regans Craanford (Wexford)	1-12
Naas (Kildare)	2-21
Ballinteer (Dublin)	0-09

Semifinals
Emeralds (Kilkenny)	1-12
Clonkill (Westmeath)	2-11
Knockananna (Wicklow)	0-11
Naas (Kildare)	2-17

Finals
Clonkill (Westmeath)
Naas (Kildare)

22 November 2026 Leinster Final	Naas (Kildare)	v	Clonkill (Westmeath)
13:30				Venue: Chadwicks Wexford Park

=== Munster ===
8 November 2026 Munster Final	Boherlahan Dualla (Tipperary)	3-14 – 2-09	Ballinhassig (Cork)
13:30				Venue: Cappamore GAA Grounds
	Gls: A Horgan 0-7 (0-4 f, 0-1 45), S Delaney, C Horgan 1-3 each, A Murphy 1-0, D Ryan 0-1.	Report	Gls: C Collins 2-6 (1-0 pen, 0-5 f), E Collins 0-2, G Healy 0-1.

=== Ulster ===
The Ulster intermediate final was not played on its scheduled date as Granemore was stripped of its Armagh Senior title after an objection during the Semi-Final regarding the participation of a suspended management team member.

Ulster Final	Granemore (Armagh)	v	Eglish (Tyrone)
				Venue: Truagh Gaels GAC, Monaghan

=== All-Ireland ===
Semi-Finals	Final
Leinster representative
Ulster representative
Boherlahan Dualla (Tipperary)
Liam Mellows (Galway)

== Junior Championship ==
=== Leinster ===
Quarter-Finals		Semi-Finals		Final
		Clough/Ballacolla (Laois)	0-13
Clough/Ballacolla (Laois)	2-07	Ballinamere/Durrow (Offaly)	0-10
Dunderry (Meath)	1-06			Clough/Ballacolla (Laois)	0-10
				Crookedwood (Westmeath)	1-09
		Johnstownbridge (Kildare)	0-08
		Crookedwood (Westmeath)	1-09

8 November 2026 Leinster Final	Clough/Ballacolla (Laois)	0-10 – 1-09	Crookedwood (Westmeath)
14:30				Venue: Woodside Furniture Páirc Mhic Eochagain
	Gls: Chloe Boyhan (0-8, 5f, 1 45), Molly Cassin (0-1), Sarah Delaney (0-1)	Report	Gls: Aisling Boyhan (0-7, 5f, 2 45s), Muireann Scally (1-0, free), Meadbh McLoughlin (0-1), Julie McLoughlin (0-1)

=== Munster ===
Semi-Finals		Final
Templeglantine (Limerick)	3-10
Eire Og (Clare)	2-05	Templeglantine (Limerick)	3-12
Cillard (Kerry)	0-07	Cillard (Kerry)	4-06
Abbeyside (Waterford)	0-06

14 November 2026 Munster Final	Templeglantine (Limerick)	3-12 – 4-06	Cillard (Kerry)
13:30				Venue: Charleville
	Gls: S. O'Brien 2-1, M Curtin 1-2, S. Woulfe 0-4, 4f, N. Curtin 0-3, C. Curtin 0-2.	Report	Gls: S. Collins 3-6, (2-3fs), R. Quinn (1-0 f).	Referee: A. Hogg

=== Ulster ===
Quarter-Finals		Semi-Finals		Final
		Crosserlough (Cavan)	2-12
Loughgiel II (Antrim)	1-08	Loughgiel II (Antrim)	0-08
Edendork (Tyrone)	0-07			Crosserlough (Cavan)	1-05
				Ballinderry (Derry)	0-12
		Mayobridge (Down)	0-04
		Ballinderry (Derry)	4-12

7 November 2026 Ulster Final	Crosserlough (Cavan)	1-05 – 0-12	Ballinderry (Derry)
13:00
		Report

=== All-Ireland ===
Preliminary Round		Semi-Finals	Final
		Crookedwood (Westmeath)
Ballinderry (Derry)	3-15	Ballinderry (Derry)
Tara (London)	0-09
		Templeglantine (Limerick)
		Oran (Roscommon)

21 November 2026 Preliminary Round	Tara (London)	3-15 – 0-09	Ballinderry (Derry)
12:00				Venue: McGovern Park, Ruislip

28 November 2026 Semi-final	Oran (Roscommon)	v	Templeglantine (Limerick)
13:00				Venue: Banagher

== Junior B Championship ==
=== Leinster ===
Semi-Finals		Final
Aughrim (Wicklow)	0-15
Kildavin/Clonegal (Carlow)	0-05	Aughrim (Wicklow)	1-05
		St Kevin's (Louth)	3-12

8 November 2026 Leinster Final	Aughrim (Wicklow)	1-05 – 3-12	St Kevin's (Louth)
12:15				Venue: Woodside Furniture Páirc Mhic Eochagain
	Gls: C Connolly 0-4, E Fanning 1-0, A Campbell 0-1	Report	Gls: L Sheridan 1-6, A King 1-2, A Gregory 1-1, G King 0-2, G Murray 0-1

=== Ulster ===
31 October 2026 Ulster Final	Tullysaran (Armagh)	6-16 – 0-06	Ballinagh (Cavan)
		Report

=== All-Ireland ===
Semi-Finals	Final
St Kevin's (Louth)
Tullysaran (Armagh)
Four Roads (Roscommon)
South West Gaels (London)

28 November 2026 Semi-final	Four Roads (Roscommon)	v	South West Gaels (London)
13:00				Venue: Abbotstown
