= All-Ireland Senior Club Camogie Championship 2022 =

Inter-county club camogie tournament

Tournament details
- Sponsor: AIB
- Dates: 10 December 2022 – 17 December 2022

Winners
- Champions: Sarsfields

Runners-up
- Runners-up: Loughgiel Shamrocks

The 2022 All-Ireland Senior Club Camogie Championship was the 59th staging of the All-Ireland Senior Club Camogie Championship, the Camogie Association's premier inter-county club camogie tournament. The championship ran from 10 December 2022 to 17 December 2022.

Sarsfields won the championship for their 3rd title and their 2nd in a row defeating Loughgiel Shamrocks in the All-Ireland final.

== Teams ==
The 4 provincial champions of the 2022 season took part:

Province	Champion	County
Connacht	Sarsfields	Galway
Leinster	St Vincents	Dublin
Munster	Drom & Inch	Tipperary
Ulster	Loughgiel Shamrocks	Antrim

== Galway Senior Club Camogie Championship ==
=== Galway final ===
5 November 2022	Sarsfields	2-11 (17) – (15) 2-09	Oranmore-Maree
		Report

== Leinster Senior Club Camogie Championship ==
=== Leinster final ===
22 November 2022 Final	St Vincents (Dublin)	1-09 (12) – (11) 0-11	Oulart–The Ballagh (Wexford)
		Report

== Munster Senior Club Camogie Championship ==
=== Munster final ===
13 November 2022	Drom & Inch (Tipperary)	0-14 (14) – (8) 0-08	Scariff-Ogonnelloe (Clare)
		Report

== Ulster Senior Club Camogie Championship ==
=== Ulster final ===
19 November 2022	Loughgiel Shamrocks (Antrim)	2-13 (19) – (16) 1-13	Slaughtneil (Derry)
		Report

== All-Ireland Senior Club Camogie Championship ==
Semi-Finals		Final
Loughgiel Shamrocks (Antrim)	3-06
Drom & Inch (Tipperary)	2-06	Loughgiel Shamrocks (Antrim)	1-14
Sarsfields (Galway)	1-11	Sarsfields (Galway)	2-14
St Vincents (Dublin)	1-10

=== All-Ireland semi-finals ===
10 December 2022	Drom & Inch (Tipperary)	3-06 (15) – (12) 2-06	Loughgiel Shamrocks (Antrim)
		Report

10 December 2022	Sarsfields (Galway)	1-11 (14) – (13) 1-10	St Vincents (Dublin)
		Report

=== All-Ireland final ===
17 December 2022	Sarsfields (Galway)	2-14 (20) – (17) 1-14	Loughgiel Shamrocks (Antrim)
		Report
