= All-Ireland Intermediate Club Camogie Championship =

Camogie championship

- Current season or competition: All-Ireland Intermediate Club Camogie Championship 2026
- Founded: 2010
- Title holders: Camross (Laois) (1st title)
- Most titles: Multiple teams (2 titles)

The All-Ireland Intermediate Club Camogie Championship is a camogie competition between clubs at the intermediate level of the strongest counties and senior clubs of the second tier of counties in Ireland.

== History ==
The All-Ireland Senior Club Camogie Championship was established in 1964. To enable participation of weaker teams and counties the All-Ireland Junior Club Camogie Championship was introduced in 2003. In 2010 the All-Ireland Intermediate Club Camogie Championship was introduced in-between as second tier of club camogie competition on a nation-wide level.

Since its inception the championship was won by teams from 11 different counties.

== Qualification ==
| Province | County | Championship | 2026 |
|---|---|---|---|
| Connacht | Roscommon | SCC | Oran |
| Connacht | Galway | ICC | Liam Mellows |
| Leinster | Carlow | SCC | Mount Leinster Rangers |
| Leinster | Dublin | S2CC | Ballinteer |
| Leinster | Kilkenny | ICC | Emeralds |
| Leinster | Laois | ICC | Camross |
| Leinster | Meath | SCC | Na Fianna |
| Leinster | Naas | SCC | Kildare |
| Leinster | Westmeath | SCC | Clonkill |
| Leinster | Wexford | ICC | Fr O`Regans Craanford |
| Leinster | Wicklow | SCC | Knockananna |
| Munster | Cork | PICC | Ballinhassig |
| Munster | Tipperary | ICC | Boherlahan Dualla |
| Ulster | Armagh | SCC | Contested |
| Ulster | Tyrone | SCC | Eglish |

| ICC | Intermediate Camogie Championship |
| PICC | Premier Intermediate Camogie Championship |
| S2CC | Senior 2 Camogie Championship |
| SCC | Senior Camogie Championship |

== Wins by Club ==
| Club | County | Wins | Years won | Runner-up | Years runner-up |
|---|---|---|---|---|---|
| St Rynagh's | Offaly | 2 | 2020–21, 2021–22 | 1 | 2019–20 |
| Eoghan Rua | Derry | 2 | 2010–11, 2011–12 | 0 | |
| Clonduff | Down | 2 | 2018–19, 2022 | 0 | |
| Clanmaurice | Kerry | 2 | 2023, 2024 | 0 | |
| Gailltir | Waterford | 1 | 2019–20 | 2 | 2018–19, 2020–21 |
| Lismore | Waterford | 1 | 2013–14 | 1 | 2014–15 |
| Castlegar | Galway | 1 | 2012–13 | 0 | |
| Piltown | Kilkenny | 1 | 2014–15 | 0 | |
| Cahir | Tipperary | 1 | 2015–16 | 0 | |
| Myshall | Carlow | 1 | 2016–17 | 0 | |
| Johnstownbridge | Kildare | 1 | 2017–18 | 0 | |
| Camross | Laois | 1 | 2025 | 0 | |
| Harps | Laois | 0 | | 1 | 2010–11 |
| Ardrahan | Galway | 0 | | 1 | 2011–12 |
| Rower-Inistioge | Kilkenny | 0 | | 1 | 2012–13 |
| Ballyhale Shamrocks | Kilkenny | 0 | | 1 | 2013–14 |
| Eyrecourt | Galway | 0 | | 1 | 2015–16 |
| Eglish | Tyrone | 0 | | 1 | 2016–17 |
| Athenry | Galway | 0 | | 1 | 2017–18 |
| Salthill-Knocknacarra | Galway | 0 | | 1 | 2021–22 |
| James Stephens | Kilkenny | 0 | | 1 | 2022 |
| Na Fianna | Meath | 0 | | 1 | 2023 |
| Ahascragh/Caltra | Galway | 0 | | 1 | 2024 |
| Ballincollig | Cork | 0 | | 1 | 2025 |

== Wins by County ==
| County | Wins | Years won | Runner-up | Years runner-up |
|---|---|---|---|---|
| Waterford | 2 | 2013–14, 2019–20 | 3 | 2014–15, 2018–19, 2020–21 |
| Offaly | 2 | 2020–21, 2021–22 | 1 | 2019–20 |
| Derry | 2 | 2010–11, 2011–12 | 0 | |
| Down | 2 | 2018–19, 2022 | 0 | |
| Kerry | 2 | 2023, 2024 | 0 | |
| Galway | 1 | 2012–13 | 5 | 2011–12, 2015–16, 2017–18, 2021–22, 2024 |
| Kilkenny | 1 | 2014–15 | 3 | 2012–13, 2013–14, 2022 |
| Tipperary | 1 | 2015–16 | 0 | |
| Carlow | 1 | 2016–17 | 0 | |
| Kildare | 1 | 2017–18 | 0 | |
| Laois | 1 | 2025 | 1 | 2010–11 |
| Tyrone | 0 | | 1 | 2016–17 |
| Meath | 0 | | 1 | 2023 |
| Cork | 0 | | 1 | 2025 |

== Finals ==
| Year | Date | Winner | Score | Runner-up | Score | Venue | Captain | Referee |
|---|---|---|---|---|---|---|---|---|
| 2010-11 | 6 March | Eoghan Rua (Derry) | 3-08 | Harps (Laois) | 2-03 | Croke Park | Maebh McGoldrick | Mike O'Kelly (Cork) |
| 2011-12 | 4 March | Eoghan Rua (Derry) | 2-08 | Ardrahan (Galway) | 0–12 | Croke Park | Maebh McGoldrick | John Dolan (Clare) |
| 2012–13 | 2 March | Castlegar (Galway) | 1-08 | Rower-Inistioge (Kilkenny) | 1-06 | Donoughmore-Ashbourne | | M. Kelly (Cork) |
| 2013-14 | 2 Mar | Lismore (Waterford) | 0-09 | Ballyhale Shamrocks (Kilkenny) | 1-06 | Croke Park | | Cathal Egan (Cork) |
| Replay | 16 March | Lismore (Waterford) | 3-08 | Ballyhale Shamrocks (Kilkenny) | 0-07 | Clonmel | Shona Curran | John Dolan (Clare) |
| 2014-15 | 1 March | Piltown (Kilkenny) | 1–10 | Lismore (Waterford) | 1-09 | Croke Park | Laura Norris | Peter Dowd (Meath) |
| 2015-16 | 6 March | Cahir (Tipperary) | 0–14 | Eyrecourt (Galway) | 1-02 | Croke Park | | L. Dempsey (Kilkenny) |
| 2016-17 | 5 March | Myshall (Carlow) | 1–10 | Eglish (Tyrone) | 1-09 | Croke Park | | F. McNamara (Clare) |
| 2017-18 | 24 March | Johnstownbridge (Kildare) | 1-08 | Athenry (Galway) | 1-06 | St Tiernach's Park | | A. Larkin (Cork) |
| 2018-19 | 3 March | Clonduff (Down) | 0–10 | Gailltir (Waterford) | 0-09 | | Paula Gribben | J. McDonagh (Galway) |
| 2019–20 | 1 March | Gailltir (Waterford) | 1–13 | St Rynagh's (Offaly) | 0–13 | Croke Park | | O.Elliot (Antrim) |
| 2020–21 | 8 January 2022 | St Rynagh's (Offaly) | 1–11 | Gailltir (Waterford) | 0–10 | Semple Stadium | Grainne Dolan | Gavin Donegan (Dublin) |
| 2021–22 | 6 March | St Rynagh's (Offaly) | 5–14 | Salthill-Knocknacarra (Galway) | 2-06 | Croke Park | Grainne Dolan | Barry Nea (Westmeath) |
| 2022 | 17 Dec 2022 | Clonduff (Down) | 0–12 | James Stephens (Kilkenny) | 1-06 | Croke Park | | C McAllister (Cork) |
| 2023 | 17 Dec 2023 | Clanmaurice (Kerry) | 1-07 | Na Fianna (Meath) | 0-07 | Croke Park | | |
| 2024 | 15 Dec 2024 | Clanmaurice (Kerry) | 2–16 | Ahascragh/Caltra (Galway) | 1-01 | Croke Park | Patrice Diggin | Gavin Donegan (Dublin) |
| 2025 | 14 Dec 2025 | Camross (Laois) | 1–14 | Ballincollig (Cork) | 1–10 | Croke Park | Aoife Collier | |

== See also ==
- All-Ireland Senior Club Camogie Championship
- All-Ireland Junior Club Camogie Championship
- Leinster Senior Club Camogie Championship
- Munster Senior Club Camogie Championship
- Ulster Senior Club Camogie Championship
