= All-Ireland Junior Club Camogie Championship =

Camogie championship

All Ireland Junior Club Camogie Championship
- Current season or competition: All-Ireland Junior Club Camogie Championship 2026
- Founded: 2003
- Trophy: Phil McBride Cup
- Title holders: Brídíní Óga Glenravel (Antrim) (2nd title)
- Most titles: The Harps (Laois) Kilmessan (Meath) (3 titles)

The All-Ireland Junior Club Camogie Championship is a camogie competition between clubs at the junior level. The winners are awarded the Phil McBride Cup.

== History ==
The All-Ireland Junior Club Camogie Championship was introduced in 2003. Since the introduction of the All-Ireland Intermediate Club Camogie Championship in 2010 it is the third tier of club camogie competition on a nation-wide level. In 2018 the All-Ireland Junior B Club Camogie Championship was introduced as a fourth tier.

== Qualification ==
Despite its name the championship is mostly contested by intermediate champions of their counties.

Province	County	Championship	2026
Connacht*	Roscommon	SCC	Oran
Leinster	Kildare	ICC	Johnstownbridge
Leinster	Laois	JCC	Clough/Ballacolla
Leinster	Meath	ICC	Dunderry
Leinster	Offaly	ICC	Ballinamere/Durrow
Leinster	Westmeath	ICC	Crookedwood
Munster	Clare	ICC	Eire Og
Munster	Kerry	JCC	Cillard
Munster	Limerick	ICC	Templeglantine
Munster	Waterford	ICC	Abbeyside
Ulster	Antrim	ICC	Loughgiel II
Ulster	Cavan	SCC	Crosserlough
Ulster	Derry	ICC	Ballinderry
Ulster	Down	ICC	Mayobridge
Ulster	Tyrone	ICC	Edendork

*	The loser of the Connacht Intermediate Championship final qualifies for the All-Ireland Junior Championship
JCC	Junior Camogie Championship
ICC	Intermediate Camogie Championship
SCC	Senior Camogie Championship

== Wins by Club ==
Club	County	Wins	Years won
Harps	Laois	3	2006, 2007, 2008
Kilmessan	Meath	3	2014, 2017, 2018
Liatroim Fontenoys	Down	2	2004, 2005
Myshall	Carlow	2	2012, 2013
Johnstownbridge	Kildare	2	2015, 2016
Brídíní Óga Glenravel	Antrim	2	2022, 2025
Crossmaglen Rangers	Armagh	1	2003
Lavey	Derry	1	2009
Four Roads	Roscommon	1	2010
Inagh	Clare	1	2011
Clanmaurice	Kerry	1	2019
Raharney	Westmeath	1	2020
Eoghan Rua	Derry	1	2021
Granemore	Armagh	1	2023
Knockananna	Wicklow	1	2024

== Wins by County ==
County	Wins	Years won
Laois	3	2006, 2007, 2008
Meath	3	2014, 2017, 2018
Down	2	2004, 2005
Carlow	2	2012, 2013
Kildare	2	2015, 2016
Derry	2	2009, 2021
Armagh	2	2003, 2023
Antrim	2	2022, 2025
Roscommon	1	2010
Clare	1	2011
Kerry	1	2019
Westmeath	1	2020
Wicklow	1	2024

== Finals ==
Year	Date	Winner	Score	Runner-up	Score	Venue	Captain	Referee
2003	2 Nov	Crossmaglen Rangers (Armagh)	2-05	Drumcullen (Offaly)	0-06	Mullingar	Eimear Carragher	Eamonn Browne (Tipperary)
2004	7 Nov	Liatroim Fontenoys (Down)	4–13	Four Rds (Roscommon)	0-08	Parnell Park	Annie Morgan	Eamonn Browne (Tipperary)
2005	20 Nov	Liatroim Fontenoys (Down)	3-07	Newmarket-on-Fergus (Clare)	0-08	Cloughjordan	Lisa McCrickard	Úna Kearney (Armagh)
2006	19 Nov	Harps (Laois)	1-07	Keady (Armagh)	0-05	Portlaoise	Isa McCrickard	Eamonn Browne (Tipperary)
2007	18 Nov	Harps (Laois)	2-08	Keady (Armagh)	2-07	Limerick	Caitríona Phelan & Louise Mahoney	John Morrissey (Tipperary)
2008	16 Nov	Harps (Laois)	1–11	Kilmaley (Clare)	3-02	Nenagh	Louise Mahoney	John Morrissey (Tipperary)
2009	6 Dec	Lavey (Derry)	1–11	St. Anne's (Waterford)	1–11	Clarecastle		Cathal Egan (Kerry)
replay	13 Dec	Lavey (Derry)	1–13	St. Anne's (Waterford)	0-07	Donoughmore-Ashbourne	Siobhán Convery	Cathal Egan (Kerry)
2010	28 Nov	Four Roads (Roscommon)	1-09	Corofin (Clare)	0-06	Ballinasloe	Lizzie Glennon-Tully	Cathal Egan (Kerry)
2011	27 Nov	Inagh (Clare)	5-04	Tara (London)	2-04	Donoughmore-Ashbourne		
2012	27 Nov	Myshall (Carlow)	1-03	Four Roads (Roscommon)	0-03	Donoughmore-Ashbourne		P. Walsh (Monaghan)
2013	24 Nov	Myshall (Carlow)	3-09	Scariff/Ogonnelloe (Clare)	0-08	Kilcormac		Ray Kelly
2014	23 Nov	Kilmessan (Meath)	2-08	Four Roads (Roscommon)	1-06	Edenderry		G. O'Dowd (Limerick)
2015	22 Nov	Johnstownbridge (Kildare)	2–10	Athleague (Roscommon)	0-07	Kinnegad		E. Cassidy (Derry)
2016	27 Nov	Johnstownbridge (Kildare)	1–10	Scariff/Ogonnelloe (Clare)	1-09	Birr	Jenna Murphy	J. Dermody (Westmeath)
2017	3 Dec	Kilmessan (Meath)	0-09	Clanmaurice (Kerry)	0-05	Silvermines		A. Doheny (Laois)
2018	25 Nov	Kilmessan (Meath)	3–12	Four Roads (Roscommon)	1–12	Páirc Tailteann		M. Ryan (Tipperary)
2019	1 Dec (Replay)	Clanmaurice (Kerry)	3-06	Raharney (Westmeath)	1-06	MacDonagh Park	Liz Houlihan	Paul Ryan (Kerry)
2020	8 Jan 2022	Raharney (Westmeath)	1-07	Clanmaurice (Kerry)	0-07	Semple Stadium		Phillip McDonald (Cavan)
2021	5 Mar 2022	Eoghan Rua (Derry)	1–11	Clanmaurice (Kerry)	1–10	Drogheda Park		John McDonagh
2022	7 January 2023	Brídíní Óga Glenravel (Antrim)	2-07	Knockananna (Wicklow)	1-05	Coralstown-Kinnegad		Brian Kearney (Kildare)
2023	16 December 2023	Granemore (Armagh)	3-09	Athleague (Roscommon)	2-05	Coralstown-Kinnegad	Ciarraí Devlin	Jerome McAllister (Antrim)
2024	14 December 2024	Knockananna (Wicklow)	3–11	Granemore (Armagh)	0–12	Donaghmore Ashbourne	Sarah Byrne	Joseph Mullins (Clare)
2025	13 December 2025	Brídíní Óga Glenravel (Antrim)	1-08	St Dominic's (Roscommon)	1-05	Donaghmore Ashbourne	Torie Edgar	Simon Redmond (Dublin)

== Junior B ==
Year	Date	Winner	Score	Runner-up	Score	Venue	Captain	Referee
2018	25 Nov	Ratoath (Meath)	1–12	Clontibret (Monaghan)	0-03	Páirc Tailteann		C. Quinlan (Galway)
2019	24 Nov 2019	Na Brídeóga (Mayo)	3-07	Denn (Cavan)	1-09	Athleague		
2020	19 Dec 2021	Naomh Treasa (Tyrone)	1-04	Knockananna (Wicklow)	0-06	Kinnegad		
2021	5 March 2022	Knockananna (Wicklow)	1–12	Derrylaughan (Tyrone)	1-07	O'Raghallaighs, Drogheda		Ciarán Groome (Offaly)
2022	18 Dec	Lacken (Cavan)	5–12	Delvin (Westmeath)	3-02	Donaghmore Ashbourne GAA	Nicole Murray	Mike Ryan (Tipperary)
2023	16 Dec 2023	St Munna’s (Westmeath)	2-07	Crossmaglen (Armagh)	1-05	Abbottstown	Sheila McGrath	Enda Loughnane (Galway)
2024	14 Dec 2024	Naomh Treasa, Dungannon (Tyrone)	2-03	Ceann Creige (Scotland)	0-04	Abbottstown	Cora McGrath	Ciarán Goff (Wicklow)
2025	13 Dec 2025	Éire Óg (Tyrone)	2-07	St. Kevin's (Louth)	1-05	Abbottstown		

== See also ==
- All-Ireland Senior Club Camogie Championship
- All-Ireland Intermediate Club Camogie Championship
- Munster Junior Club Camogie Championship
- Leinster Junior Club Camogie Championship
- Ulster Junior Club Camogie Championship
