= Croagh-Kilfinny GAA =

County Limerick based GAA club

- CLG Cróch-Cill Fiodhnaí
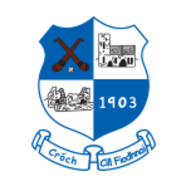
- Founded: 1903
- County: Limerick
- Colours: Blue and White
- Grounds: Páirc an Chrócaigh

Playing kits
Standard colours

Senior Club Championships
	All Ireland	Munster champions	Limerick champions
Camogie:	1	2	14

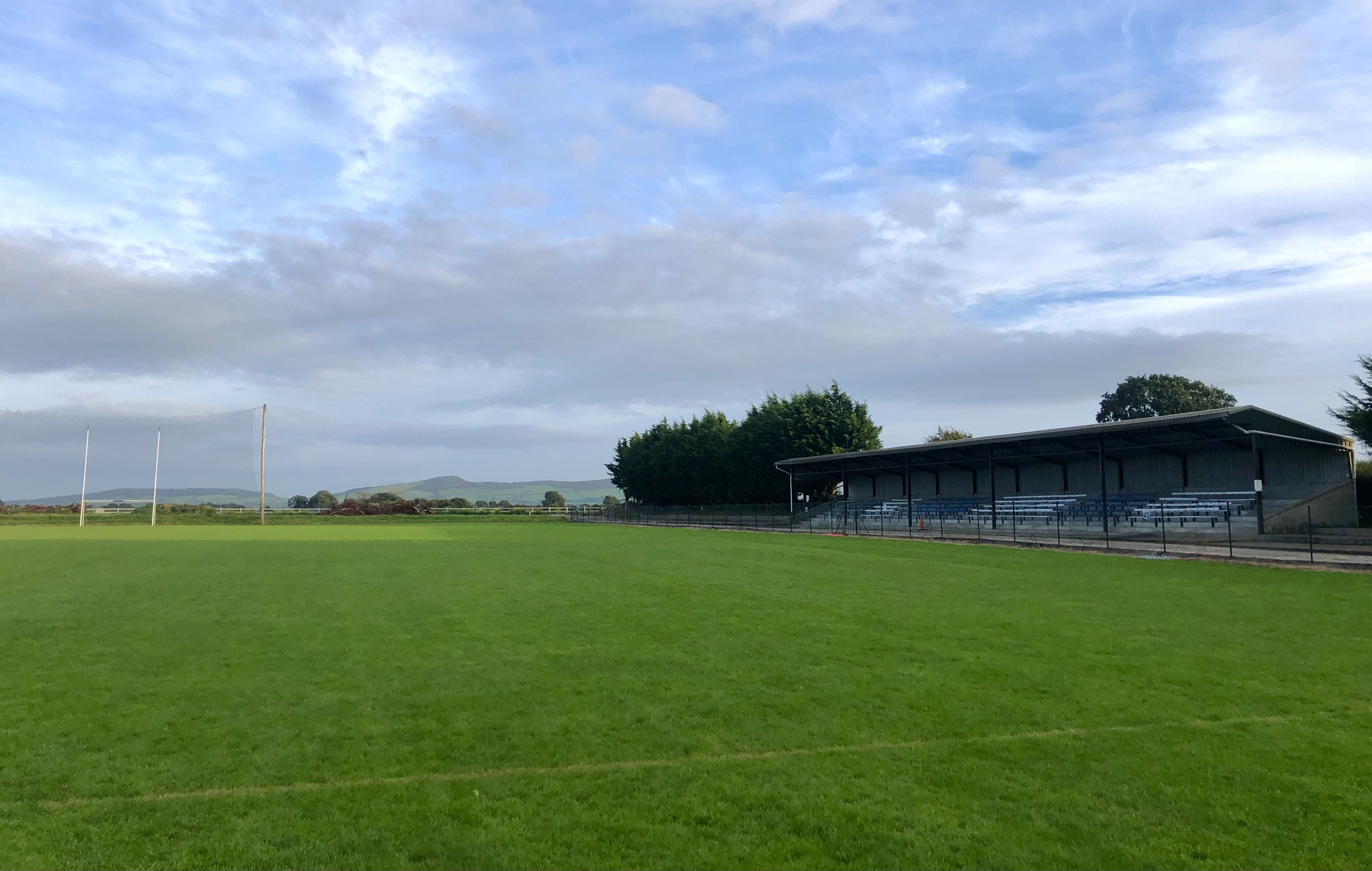
Páirc an Chrócaigh pictured August 2023

Croagh-Kilfinny GAA is a Gaelic Athletic Association club based in County Limerick, Ireland. Located near the village of Croagh, and in the Catholic parish of Croagh-Kilfinny, it is a member of the west division of Limerick GAA. The club was founded in 1903 as Croagh GAA and caters exclusively for the sport of hurling. As of 2026, the club plays at Premier Intermediate level, having won the Limerick Intermediate Hurling Championship in 2024.

== Location ==
The club is based in the villages of Croagh and Kilfinny, situated in mid-Limerick, roughly 22 km south west of Limerick City, on the N21 national primary road. Located at Adamswood, Croagh, Pairc an Chrocaigh is the club's home grounds.

== History ==
Croagh-Kilfinny's first team played at Junior level until 2021, when they won the Covid-delayed 2020 Limerick Junior Hurling Championship, beating Patrickswell in the final by 2–22 to 0–8. In their debut season at Intermediate level, the club reached the 2021 Intermediate Championship final, losing out to Effin on a scoreline of 0–22 to 0–15. Croagh-Kilfinny reached the final for a second successive year in 2022, but were again defeated, on this occasion by Na Piarsaigh, losing out 1–19 to 0-14. The club qualified for a third successive Intermediate final in 2023, where they faced neighbours and rivals Granagh-Ballingarry. Granagh-Ballingarry defeated Croagh-Kilfinny on a 0-18 to 1-13 scoreline. The club were finally victorious at the fourth attempt in as many years, defeating Bruree in the 2024 Intermediate final by 0-18 to 1-14.

== Honours ==
=== Hurling ===
- Limerick Intermediate Hurling Championship (1): 2024 (runners-up: 2021, 2022, 2023)
- County Intermediate League (1): 2021
- West Intermediate League (1): 2021
- Limerick Junior Hurling Championship (1): 2020
- West Junior A Championship (2): 1994, 2005 (runners-up: 1986, 1992)
- County Minor 'A' Championship (2): 1997, 2017 (as Croagh Kilfinny/Rathkeale)
- West Minor Championship (1): 1938 (as Kilfinny)

=== Camogie ===
- All-Ireland Senior Club Camogie Championship (1): 1975-76
- Munster Senior Club Camogie Championship (2): 1975, 1983
- Limerick Senior Camogie Championship (14): 1953, 1954, 1955, 1961, 1962, 1964, 1965, 1966, 1975, 1983, 1984, 1987, 1989, 1995

== Notable players ==
- Mick Neville
- Seamus Hickey
