= Offaly Senior Camogie Championship =

Annual club camogie competition

- Current season or competition: 2026 Offaly Senior Camogie Championship
- Code: Camogie
- Founded: 1993; 33 years ago
- Region: Offaly (GAA)
- Trophy: R.J. Barber Cup
- No. of teams: 8
- Title holders: Shinrone (9th title)
- Most titles: Drumcullen (14 titles)
- Sponsors: HQ Physio
- Official website: Official website

The Offaly Senior Camogie Championship (known for sponsorship reasons as the HQ Physio Offaly Senior Camogie Championship) is an annual Camogie competition contested by the 8 top ranking Camogie teams in Offaly.

Games are played during the summer and autumn months with the county final currently being played in October. The prize for the winning team is the R.J. Barber Cup. The championship currently features a group stage followed by a knock-out stage.

The Offaly County Championship is part of the Leinster Senior Club Camogie Championship. The winners of the Offaly County Final join the senior champions of the other counties to contest the provincial championship.

The 2026 Offaly Senior Camogie Championship was won by Shinrone after beating St Cillian's 2–13 to 1–12 in the final.

== History ==
The first records of camogie in Offaly are from the 1930s when 9 clubs existed. After World War II, the game declined in Offaly. In 1973, Tullamore was the only club in Offaly and played in the Laois Championship. By 1979 new clubs were founded in Birr, Drumcullen, Clara and Kilcormac. This allowed the formation of an Offaly Camogie County Board and a Junior Championship in 1980.

In 1993 the Senior Championship was introduced. Initially, the championship was dominated by Drumcullen and Shinrone, who shared every title until 2013 with the single exception of Tullamore in 2007. Since 2013, also Birr, St Rynaghs and St Cillian's have won at least one championship.

== Format ==
As of 2026 8 teams are divided into 2 groups of 4. The teams play the teams in the opposite group. 2 points are awarded for a win and 1 for a draw. All teams are ranked in one table.

The top 4 teams qualify for the semi-finals.

The 2 teams winning the semi-finals contest the county final to determine the Senior A champion.

The bottom 4 teams play Senior B semi-finals.

The 2 winners play the Senior B finals, while the 2 losers play a relegation match.

== Teams ==
=== 2026 teams ===
The 8 teams competing in the 2026 Offaly Senior Camogie Championship were:

Club	Position in 2026	Championship titles	Last championship title
Shinrone	Champion	9	2026
St Cillian's	Runners-up	1	2024
Birr	Semi-Final	4	2025
Drumcullen	Semi-Final	14	2011
Kilcormac Killoughey	B Champion	0	
Tullamore	B Runners-up	1	2007
St Rynaghs	Relegation Final	5	2021
Naomh Brid	Relegated	0	

== Qualification for subsequent competitions ==
The Offaly Senior Camogie Championship winners qualify for the subsequent Leinster Senior Club Camogie Championship.

== Roll of honour ==
Club	Titles	Years won
Drumcullen	14	2011, 2010, 2009, 2005, 2003, 2002, 2000, 1999, 1998, 1997, 1996, 1995, 1994, 1993
Shinrone	9	2026, 2016, 2015, 2013, 2012, 2008, 2006, 2004, 2001
St Rynaghs	5	2021 2020, 2019, 2018, 2017
Birr	4	2025, 2023, 2022, 2014
Tullamore	1	2007
St Cillian's	1	2024

== List of finals ==
Year	Champion	Score	Runners-Up	Score	Source
2026	Shinrone	2-13	St Cillian's	1-12	
2025	Birr	3-18	Shinrone	1-10	
2024	St Cillian's	1-10	Birr	1-05	
2023	Birr	1-15	St Cillian's	0-11	
2022	Birr	2-11	Shinrone	1-08	
2021	St Rynaghs	3-19	Birr	2-13	
2020	St Rynaghs	3-16	Shinrone	4-09	
2019	St Rynaghs	1-15	Shinrone	1-12	
2018	St Rynaghs	1-19	Shinrone	0-10	
2017	St Rynaghs	4-16	Shinrone	1-06	
2016	Shinrone	2-16	St Cillian's	1-06	
2015	Shinrone	3-18	Birr	1-10	
2014	Birr	3-07	Shinrone	0-15	
2013	Shinrone	4-15	Tullamore	3-06	
2012	Shinrone	3-15	Drumcullen	2-10	
2011	Drumcullen	0-16	Shinrone	3-5	
2010	Drumcullen	2-11	Birr	2-07	
2009	Drumcullen	2-10	Tullamore	2-07	
2008	Shinrone	2-08	Drumcullen	1-07	
2007	Tullamore	3-11	Shinrone	0-06	
2006	Shinrone	2-13	Drumcullen	0-03	
2005	Drumcullen	1-10	Shinrone	1-05	
2004	Shinrone	1-09, 5-07	Drumcullen	1-09, 1-07	
2003	Drumcullen	4-08	Shinrone	1-03	
2002	Drumcullen				
2001	Shinrone				
2000	Drumcullen				
1999	Drumcullen	5-04	Shinrone	3-03	
1998	Drumcullen	5-11	Tullamore	1-02	
1997	Drumcullen	1-14	Shinrone	0-10	
1996	Drumcullen	1-10	Shinrone	2-04	
1995	Drumcullen	3-06	Shinrone	1-04	
1994	Drumcullen	3-13	Shinrone	3-08	
1993	Drumcullen	3-08	Shinrone	1-04	

== See also ==
Leinster Senior Club Camogie Championship

All Ireland Senior Club Camogie Championship
