= Waterford Senior Camogie Championship =

Annual club camogie competition

- Current season or competition: 2026 Waterford Senior Camogie Championship
- Code: Camogie
- Region: Waterford (GAA)
- No. of teams: 8
- Title holders: Gailltir (10+th title)
- Sponsors: Clannad Care
- Official website: Official website

The Waterford Senior Camogie Championship (known for sponsorship reasons as the Clannad Care Waterford Senior Camogie Championship) is an annual camogie competition contested by the 8 top ranking camogie teams in Waterford.

Games are played during the summer and autumn months in October. The championship currently features a group stage followed by a knock-out stage.

The Waterford County Championship is part of the Munster Senior Club Camogie Championship. The winners of the Waterford county final join the senior champions of the other counties to contest the provincial championship.

The 2026 Waterford Senior Camogie Championship was won by Gailltir after defeating De La Salle 0–15 to 0–12 in the final.

== Format ==
The eight teams are divided into two groups of four. The teams face each other team in their group. 3 points are awarded for a win and 1 for a draw.

The top team of both groups qualifies directly for the semi-finals. The second and third placed teams face each other in the quarter-finals. The winner advances to the semi-finals.

The two teams winning the semi-finals contest the county final to determine the champion.

== Teams ==
=== 2026 teams ===
The 10 teams competing in the 2026 Waterford Senior Camogie Championship were:

Club	Position in 2026	Championship titles	Last championship title
Gailltír	Champion	10+	2026
De La Salle	Runners-Up	3	2025
Cappoquin	Semi-Final		
St Annes	Semi-Final	8	2012
Brickey Rangers	Quarter-Final		
Modeligo	Quarter-Final		
Tramore			
Lismore		6+	2017

== Qualification for subsequent competitions ==
The Waterford Senior Camogie Championship winners qualify for the subsequent Munster Senior Club Camogie Championship.

== Roll of honour ==
Club	Titles	Years won
Gailltír	10+	1962, 1963, 2008, 2016, 2018, 2019, 2020, 2021, 2024, 2026
St Annes	8	2000, 2002, 2003, 2004, 2005, 2007, 2009, 2012
Lismore	6+	2010, 2011, 2013, 2014, 2015, 2017
De La Salle	3	2022, 2023, 2025

== List of finals ==
Year	Winners		Runners-up		Source
Year	Club	Score	Club	Score	Source
1962	Gailltír				
1963	Gailltír				
1964-1999					
2000	St Annes				
2001					
2002	St Annes				
2003	St Annes				
2004	St Annes				
2005	St Annes				
2006					
2007	St Annes				
2008	Gailltír	1-07 (Replay)	St Annes	0-08	
2009	St Annes				
2010	Lismore				
2011	Lismore				
2012	St Annes		Lismore		
2013	Lismore	2-15	St Annes	0-15	
2014	Lismore	1-07	St Annes	0-09	
2015	Lismore	0-15	St Annes	1-07	
2016	Gailltír	2-11	Lismore	1-06	
2017	Lismore	2-10	Gailltír	0-11	
2018	Gailltír	1-17	De La Salle	2-13	
2019	Gailltír	2-17	Cappoquin	0-04	
2020	Gailltír	3-13	St Annes	1-16	
2021	Gailltír	0-16	De La Salle	1-10	
2022	De La Salle	1-12	Gailltír	1-10	
2023	De La Salle	0-09	Gailltír	0-08	
2024	Gailltír	1-16	De La Salle	1-14	
2025	De La Salle	3-09	Gailltír	0-13	
2026	Gailltír	0-15	De La Salle	0-12	

== See also ==
Munster Senior Club Camogie Championship

All Ireland Senior Club Camogie Championship
