= Gailltir Camogie Club =

Camogie club in county Waterford

- Founded: 1958
- County: Waterford
- Nickname: Barony Ladies
- Colours: Sky Blue and Navy
- Grounds: Ballymabin, Dunmore East

Playing kits

Senior Club Championships
	All Ireland	Munster champions	Waterford champions
Camogie:	0	0	10+

Gailltir Camogie Club is a Camogie Association club based in Ballymabin, Dunmore East in county Waterford.

== History ==
The club was founded in 1958. The first game was against Mooncoin in Kilkenny and their first win was against Ballinamult.

They won their first Senior Championship in 1962 and could defend their title in 1963.

Gailltir won 5 out of 6 Munster Intermediate Club Camogie Championship between 2016 and 2021.

They also reached the All-Ireland Intermediate Camogie Championship final in 2018, 2019-20 and 2020–21. They won the final in 2019–20 after defeating St Rynagh's from Offaly.

Their successes combined with the success of the Waterford county team lead to Waterford being promoted to the All-Ireland and Munster Senior Camogie Championship. In 2024 they reached the Munster final for the first time, but lost after double extra-time in a penalty shoot-out.

== Honours ==
All Ireland Intermediate Club Camogie Championship: 1

- 2019-20

Munster Intermediate Club Camogie Championship: 5

- 2016, 2018, 2019, 2020, 2021-22

Waterford Senior Camogie Championship: 10+

- 1962, 1963, 2008, 2016, 2018, 2019, 2020, 2021, 2024, 2026

== Gaultier Ladies Gaelic Football Club ==
Several of their members play for the Gaultier Ladies Gaelic Football Club. In 2026 they won both the Waterford Senior Camogie Championship and the Waterford Ladies Gaelic Football Championship.
