= Limerick Senior Camogie Championship =

Annual camogie competition in Ireland

- Irish: Craobh Chamógaíochta Luimnigh
- Code: Camogie
- Region: Limerick (GAA)
- No. of teams: 8
- Title holders: Newcastle West (6th title)
- Most titles: Granagh-Ballingarry (24 titles)
- Official website: Website

The Limerick Camogie Championship is the senior camogie competition featuring clubs affiliated to the Limerick camogie county board.

Granagh-Ballingarry are the competitions most successful club, having won 24 titles.

Newcastle West are the reigning champions, having defeated Bruff GAA in the 2026 final.

== Teams ==
The following teams participated in the 2026 Limerick Senior Camogie Championship:

Team	Position in 2026	Titles	Last title
Newcastle West	Champion	6	2026
Bruff	Runners-up	0	
Monaleen	Semi-Finals	0	
Adare	Semi-Finals	1	1957
Patrickswell	Senior B Champion	1	1956
Killeedy	Senior B Runners-up	6	2020
Croagh-Kilfinny	Relegation Final	14	1995
Ahane	Relegated to Intermediate	10	2022

== Roll of honour ==
#	Club	Titles	Years won
1	Granagh-Ballingarry	24	1985, 1986, 1988, 1990, 1991, 1992, 1993, 1994, 1996, 1997, 1998, 1999, 2000, 2001, 2002, 2003, 2004, 2006, 2010, 2013, 2014, 2015, 2016, 2017
2	Croagh-Kilfinny	14	1953, 1954, 1955, 1961, 1962, 1964, 1965, 1966, 1975, 1983, 1984, 1987, 1989, 1995
3	Ahane	10	1967, 1968, 1969, 1970, 1971, 1972, 1973, 1976, 2018, 2022
4	Killeedy	6	2005, 2007, 2008, 2009, 2012, 2020
4	Ballyagran	6	1974, 1977, 1978, 1979, 1980, 2011
4	Newcastle West	6	2019, 2021, 2023, 2024, 2025, 2026
7	St Patrick's	2	1947, 1949
8	Old Christians	1	1982
8	St Oliver's	1	1981
8	Athlacca	1	1963
8	Adare	1	1957
8	Patrickswell	1	1956

== Finals listed by year ==
Munster and All-Ireland winners
Munster winners and All-Ireland finalists
Munster winners

Year	Winner	Score	Runners up	Score
2026	Newcastle West	0-13	Bruff	1-09
2025	Newcastle West	1-22	Monaleen	0-5
2024	Newcastle West	1-17	Ahane	1-7
2023	Newcastle West	0-17	Killeedy	1-5
2022	Ahane	1-13	Killeedy	1-9
2021	Newcastle West	1-9	Killeedy	0-8
2020	Killeedy	1-9	Newcastle West	0-7
2019	Newcastle West	1-15	Ahane	0-9
2018	Ahane	3-11	Granagh-Ballingarry	1-07
2017	Granagh-Ballingarry	0-17	Ahane	0-09
2016	Granagh-Ballingarry	1-04	Killeedy	1-03
2015	Granagh-Ballingarry	1-04	Killeedy	1-03
2014	Granagh-Ballingarry	2-07	Killeedy	1-03
2013	Granagh-Ballingarry	3-09	Ahane	1-08
2012	Killeedy		Ahane	
2011	Ballyagran		Killeedy	
2010	Granagh-Ballingarry			
2009	Killeedy			
2008	Killeedy			
2007	Killeedy			
2006	Granagh-Ballingarry			
2005	Killeedy			
2004	Granagh-Ballingarry			
2003	Granagh-Ballingarry			
2002	Granagh-Ballingarry			
2001	Granagh-Ballingarry			
2000	Granagh-Ballingarry			
1999	Granagh-Ballingarry			
1998	Granagh-Ballingarry		Bruff	
1997	Granagh-Ballingarry			
1996	Granagh-Ballingarry		Bruff	
1995	Croagh-Kilfinny			
1994	Granagh-Ballingarry			
1993	Granagh-Ballingarry			
1992	Granagh-Ballingarry			
1991	Granagh-Ballingarry		Star Rovers Bruff	
1990	Granagh-Ballingarry			
1989	Croagh-Kilfinny			
1988	Granagh-Ballingarry		Star Rovers Bruff	
1987	Croagh-Kilfinny			
1986	Granagh-Ballingarry			
1985	Granagh-Ballingarry		Old Christians	
1984	Croagh-Kilfinny			
1983	Croagh-Kilfinny		Old Christians	
1982	Old Christians	0-08	Croagh-Kilfinny	0-01
1981	St Oliver's	3-1	Croagh-Kilfinny	0-4
1980	Ballyagran	4-1	Croagh-Kilfinny	0-3
1979	Ballyagran	4-04	Croagh-Kilfinny	2-06
1978	Ballyagran	WO	Ahane scratch	
1977	Ballyagran	4-1	Ahane	0-01
1976	Ahane	3-4	Ballyagran	3-3
1975	Croagh-Kilfinny		Ballyagran	
1974	Ballyagran		Ahane	
1973	Ahane			
1972	Ahane			
1971	Ahane			
1970	Ahane			
1969	Ahane			
1968	Ahane			
1967	Ahane			
1966	Croagh-Kilfinny			
1965	Croagh-Kilfinny			
1964	Croagh-Kilfinny			
1963	Athlacca		Croagh-Kilfinny	
1962	Croagh-Kilfinny		Athlacca	
1961	Croagh-Kilfinny			
1960				
1959				
1958				
1957	Adare	9-1	Stonehall	1-0
1956	Patrickswell	3-1	Effin	0-1
1955	Croagh-Kilfinny			
1954	Croagh-Kilfinny	4-3	Adare	3-2
1953	Croagh-Kilfinny			
1952				
1951				
1950				
1949	St. Patricks	3-0	Ahane	0-0
1948				
1947	St. Patricks	2-0	Castleconnell	1-1
