= Derry Senior Camogie Championship =

Annual club camogie competition

- Current season or competition: 2026 Derry Senior Camogie Championship
- Code: Camogie
- Region: Derry (GAA)
- No. of teams: 8
- Title holders: Swatragh GAC (28th title)
- Sponsors: Errigal Group
- Official website: Official website

The Derry Senior Camogie Championship (known for sponsorship reasons as the Errigal Group Derry Senior Camogie Championship) is an annual Camogie competition contested by the top ranking Camogie teams in Derry.

Games are played during the summer and autumn months with the county final currently being played in October. The Derry County Championship is part of the Ulster Senior Club Camogie Championship. The winners of the Derry county final join the senior champions of the other counties to contest the provincial championship.

8 teams currently participate in the Derry County Championship.

The 2026 Derry Senior Camogie Championship was won by Swatragh GAC.

== Format ==
Since 2026 the championship is played as a knock-out with a backdoor in the initial stages.

=== Round 1 ===
The 8 teams play in 4 first round matches. The winners advance to round 2A the losers to round 2B.

=== Round 2A ===
The 4 winners from round 1 take part. The winners advance to the semi-finals. The losers progress to round 3.

=== Round 2B ===
The 4 losers from round 2 take part. The winners advance to round 3. The losers are eliminated.

=== Round 3 ===
The 2 losers from round 2A face the 2 winners from round 2B. The winners advance to the semi-finals. The losers are eliminated.

=== Semi-finals ===
The 2 winners from round 2A face the 2 winners from round 3. The 2 winners advance to the finals.

=== Finals ===
The 2 winners from the semi-finals contest the final. The winner becomes the champion and qualifies for the Ulster Senior Club Camogie Championship.

== Teams ==
=== 2026 teams ===
The 8 teams competing in the 2026 Derry Senior Camogie Championship were:

Club	Position in 2026	Championship titles	Last championship title
Swatragh	Champion	28	2026
Bellaghy	Runners-up	6	1993
Lavey	Semi-final	6	2009
Ballinascreen	Semi-final	0	
Slaughtneil	Round 3	11	2025
Glen	Round 3	0	
Newbridge	Round 2	0	
Dungiven	Round 2	0	

== Qualification for subsequent competitions ==
The Derry Senior Camogie Championship winners qualify for the subsequent Ulster Senior Club Camogie Championship.

== Roll of honour ==
Club	Titles	Years won
Swatragh	28	1974, 1975, 1976, 1977, 1978, 1979, 1980, 1981, 1982, 1983, 1984, 1985, 1986, 1987, 1988, 1989, 1990, 1991, 1992, 2000, 2001, 2003, 2005, 2026
Slaughtneil	11	2012, 2015, 2016, 2017, 2018, 2019, 2020, 2021, 2022, 2023, 2025
Lavey	6	1995, 1999, 2004, 2007, 2008, 2009
Bellaghy	6	1970, 1972, 1993
Eoghan Rua	4	2010, 2011, 2013, 2014
Castledawson	1	2006

== List of finals ==
=== Legend ===
- Gold – All-Ireland Senior Club champions
- Silver – Ulster Senior Club champions

Year	Winners		Runners-up		Source
Year	Club	Score	Club	Score	Source
1970	Bellaghy				
1971					
1972	Bellaghy				
1973					
1974	Swatragh				
1975	Swatragh				
1976	Swatragh				
1977	Swatragh				
1978	Swatragh				
1979	Swatragh				
1980	Swatragh				
1981	Swatragh				
1982	Swatragh				
1983	Swatragh				
1984	Swatragh				
1985	Swatragh				
1986	Swatragh				
1987	Swatragh				
1988	Swatragh				
1989	Swatragh				
1990	Swatragh				
1991	Swatragh				
1992	Swatragh				
1993	Bellaghy				
1994					
1995	Lavey				
1996					
1997					
1998					
1999	Lavey				
2000	Swatragh				
2001	Swatragh				
2002					
2003	Swatragh				
2004	Lavey				
2005	Swatragh				
2006	Castledawson	3-06	Lavey	2-07	
2007	Lavey				
2008	Lavey				
2009	Lavey				
2010	Eoghan Rua	2-15	Ballinderry	0-05	
2011	Eoghan Rua				
2012	Slaughtneil				
2013	Eoghan Rua				
2014	Eoghan Rua				
2015	Slaughtneil				
2016	Slaughtneil	2-08	Ballinascreen	1-04	
2017	Slaughtneil				
2018	Slaughtneil				
2019	Slaughtneil				
2020	Slaughtneil	2-08 (R)	Swatragh	1-07 (R)	
2021	Slaughtneil	1-14	Ballinascreen	0-03	
2022	Slaughtneil		Swatragh		
2023	Slaughtneil	1-15	Swatragh	0-07	
2024	Swatragh	1-12	Slaughtneil	0-13	
2025	Slaughtneil	2-16	Swatragh	0-07	
2026	Swatragh	1-15	Bellaghy	1-11	

== See also ==
Ulster Senior Club Camogie Championship

All Ireland Senior Club Camogie Championship
