= Galway Senior Camogie Championship =

Annual camogie competition in Ireland

- Code: Camogie
- Founded: 1966
- Region: Galway (GAA)
- Trophy: Catherine Donnellan Cup
- Title holders: Sarsfields (9th title)
- Most titles: Athenry (13 titles)
- Official website: galwaycamogie.ie

The Galway Camogie Championship is the senior camogie competition featuring clubs affiliated to the Galway GAA.

Athenry are the competitions most successful club, having won 13 titles.

Sarsfields are also the reigning champions, having defeated Oranmore-Maree in the 2026 final.

The winners of the Galway Senior Camogie Championship are awarded the Catherine Donnellan Cup.

== Format ==
8 teams contest the Galway Senior A Hurling Championship.

=== Group stage ===
The teams are split into 2 groups of 4. Each team plays against every team from the other group for a total of 4 games. 3 points are awarded for a win. 1 point is awarded for a draw. The 1st team of each group directly advances to the Semi-Finals. 2nd and 3rd placed teams advance to the Quarter-Finals. The 4th placed teams move on to the relegation final.

=== Relegation Final ===
The 4th placed teams of both groups face each other. The loser is relegated to the Senior B Championship.

=== Quarter-Finals ===
The 2nd placed teams face the 3rd placed team of their own groups. The winners advance to the Semi-Finals.

=== Semi-Finals ===
The 1st placed team faces the Quarter-Final winner of the teams of their own group. The 2 winners advance to the Final.

=== Finals ===
The 2 Semi-Final winners face each other. The winner becomes champion and qualifies for the All-Ireland Senior Club Camogie Championship.

== Teams ==
Team	Position in 2026	Titles	Last Title
Sarsfields	Champion	9	2026
Oranmore-Maree	Runners-up	11	1981
Athenry	Semi-Final	13	2025
Shamrocks	Semi-Final	0	–
Mullagh	Quarter-Final	5	2014
Ardrahan	Quarter-Final	2	2018
Clarinbridge	Relegation Final	0	–
Davitt's	Relegated to Senior B championship	5	2005

== Roll of honour ==
#	Club	Titles	Years won
1	Athenry	13	1975, 1976, 1977, 1978, 1979, 1982, 1985, 1986, 2006, 2007, 2008, 2009, 2025
2	Oranmore-Maree	11	1966, 1967, 1968, 1969, 1970, 1971, 1972, 1973, 1974, 1980, 1981
3	Sarsfields	9	2016, 2017, 2019, 2020, 2021, 2022, 2023, 2024, 2026
4	Pearse's	8	1992, 1994, 1996, 1997, 1998, 2000, 2001, 2002
5	Mullagh	5	1989, 1990, 1991, 1993, 2014
5	Davitt's	5	1995, 1999, 2003, 2004, 2005
7	St. Mary’s Glenamaddy	4	1983, 1984, 1987, 1988
7	Killimor	4	2010, 2011, 2012, 2015
9	Ardrahan	2	2013, 2018

== List of finals ==
All-Ireland winners
All-Ireland runners-up

Year	Winner	Score	Runners up	Score	Venue
2026	Sarsfields	3-17	Oranmore–Maree	0-10	Athenry
2025	Athenry	2-08	Sarsfields	1-08	Athenry
2024	Sarsfields	1-15	St Thomas'	1-06	Gort
2023	Sarsfields	2-13	Oranmore-Maree	0-07	Ballinasloe
2022	Sarsfields	2-11	Oranmore-Maree	2-09	
2021	Sarsfields	2-10	Oranmore-Maree	0-07	Ballinasloe
2020	Sarsfields	1-10	Ardrahan	1-07	Gort
2019	Sarsfields	1-11	St. Thomas'	0-07	Loughrea
2018	Ardrahan	3-07	Sarsfields	0-11	Ballinasloe
2017	Sarsfields	3-10	Mullagh	1-7	
2016	Sarsfields	1-13 (Replay); 0-12	Mullagh	1-8 (Replay); 1-9	Ballinasloe
2015	Killimor	2-5	Ardrahan	1-6	Loughrea
2014	Mullagh	4-6	Ardrahan	1-8	Loughrea
2013	Ardrahan	3-8	Mullagh	1-7	Loughrea
2012	Killimor	2-12	Sarsfields	1-4	Ballinasloe
2011	Killimor	1-13	Davitt's	0-6	Ballinasloe
2010	Killimor	3-7	Mullagh	2-7	Loughrea
2009	Athenry				
2008	Athenry				
2007	Athenry				
2006	Athenry				
2005	Davitts				
2004	Davitts				
2003	Davitts				
2002	Pearses				
2001	Pearses				
2000	Pearses				
1999	Davitts				
1998	Pearses				
1997	Pearses				
1996	Pearses				
1995	Davitts				
1994	Pearses				
1993	Mullagh	4-8	Pearses	1-10	Craughwell
1992	Pearses	5-7 (Replay); 4-6	Davitts	4-7 (Replay); 2-12	Turloughmore
1991	Mullagh				
1990	Mullagh				
1989	Mullagh				
1988	St. Mary’s Glenamaddy				
1987	St. Mary’s Glenamaddy				
1986	Athenry				
1985	Athenry				
1984	St. Mary’s Glenamaddy				
1983	St. Mary’s Glenamaddy				
1982	Athenry				
1981	Oranmore-Maree				
1980	Oranmore-Maree				
1979	Athenry				
1978	Athenry				
1977	Athenry				
1976	Athenry				
1975	Athenry				
1974	Oranmore-Maree				
1973	Oranmore-Maree				
1972	Oranmore-Maree				
1971	Oranmore-Maree				
1970	Oranmore-Maree				
1969	Oranmore-Maree				
1968	Oranmore-Maree				
1967	Oranmore-Maree				
1966	Oranmore-Maree				

== See also ==
- All-Ireland Senior Club Camogie Championship
- Munster Senior Club Camogie Championship
- Leinster Senior Club Camogie Championship
- Ulster Senior Club Camogie Championship
