= Munster Senior Club Camogie Championship =

Camogie competition in Ireland

- Irish: Craobh Club Chamógaíochta na Mumhan
- Code: Camogie
- Founded: 1964; 62 years ago
- Region: Munster (GAA)
- Title holders: St Finbarr's (2nd title)
- Most titles: Glen Rovers (9 titles)
- Official website: Official website

The Munster Senior Club Camogie Championship is an annual camogie competition organised by the Munster Council of the Camogie Association and contested by the champion senior clubs in the province of Munster in Ireland. It is the most prestigious club competition in Munster camogie.

The winner of the Munster championship contests the semi-final of the All-Ireland Senior Club Camogie Championship.

The championship was first contested in 1964.

St Finbarr's are the reigning champions, having beaten Gailltir by 2–13 to 2–09.

== Roll of honour ==
#	Club	County	Titles	Runners-up	Years won	Years runners-up
1	Glen Rovers	Cork	9	3	1964, 1967, 1986, 1987, 1990, 1991, 1992, 1993, 1994	1965, 1968, 1996
2	Granagh-Ballingarry	Limerick	7	5	1996, 1997, 1998, 1999, 2000, 2003, 2004	1986, 2001, 2010, 2013, 2014
3	Cashel	Tipperary	6	6	2001, 2002, 2005, 2006, 2007, 2009	1981, 1987, 1989, 1991, 1998, 1999
4	Killeagh	Cork	5	0	1980, 1981, 1982, 1984, 1988	
5	Drom & Inch	Tipperary	4	6	2008, 2011, 2020, 2022	1975, 1976, 2003, 2019, 2021, 2023
5	Ahane	Limerick	4	4	1968, 1969, 1972, 1976	1967, 1970, 1971, 1973
5	Milford	Cork	4	1	2012, 2013, 2014, 2015	2004
8	Ballyagran	Limerick	3	0	1977, 1978, 1979	
9	Croagh-Kilfinny	Limerick	2	2	1975, 1983	1964, 1966
9	Scariff Ogonnelloe	Clare	2	1	2019, 2021	2022
9	Inniscarra	Cork	2	1	2010, 2018	2016
9	Burgess Duharra	Tipperary	2	1	2016, 2017	2012
9	Thurles	Tipperary	2	0	1971, 1973	
9	St Patrick's, Glengoole	Tipperary	2	0	1965, 1966	
9	St Finbarr's	Cork	2	0	2025, 2026	
16	Sixmilebridge	Clare	1	4	1989	1983, 1988, 1990, 1992
16	Toomevara	Tipperary	1	1	1995	1997
16	Éire Óg, Cork	Cork	1	1	1985	1977
16	South Presentation P.P	Cork	1	1	1970	1969
16	Truagh-Clonlara	Clare	1	0	2024	
16	Sarsfields	Cork	1	0	2023	
16	U.C.C	Cork	1	0	1974	
22	Éire Óg, Ennis	Clare	0	4		1972, 1974, 1978, 1980
22	Inagh-Kilnamona	Clare	0	3		2017, 2018, 2020
22	Wolfe Tones	Clare	0	3		1993, 1994, 1995
22	Douglas	Cork	0	2		2008, 2011
22	Killeedy	Limerick	0	2		2005, 2007
22	Gailltir	Waterford	0	1		2024, 2026
22	De La Salle	Waterford	0	1		2025
22	Newmarket-on-Fergus	Clare	0	1		2015
22	St Catherine's	Cork	0	1		2009
22	Milford	Cork	0	1		2004
22	Bishopstown	Cork	0	1		2000
22	Portroe	Tipperary	0	1		1985
22	Ardkeen	Waterford	0	1		1984
22	Old Christians	Limerick	0	1		1982

=== By county ===
County	Titles	Runners-up	Total
Cork	26	12	38
Tipperary	17	15	32
Limerick	16	14	30
Clare	4	18	22
Waterford	0	4	4

== Finals Listed By Year ==
Year	Winner	County	Score	Opponent	County	Score
2026	St Finbarr's	Cork	2-13	Gailltir	Waterford	2-09
2025	St Finbarr's	Cork	3–11	De La Salle	Waterford	2–12
2024	Truagh-Clonlara	Clare	1-09 (Note: Truagh-Clonlara won 9-8 in a 45s shootout) (4–12)	Gailltir	Waterford	1-09 (Note: Gaultier lost 8-9 in a 45s shootout) (3–15)
2023	Sarsfields	Cork	2–11	Drom & Inch	Tipperary	2-07
2022	Drom & Inch	Tipperary	0–14	Scariff Ogonnelloe	Clare	0-08
2021	Scariff Ogonnelloe	Clare	1-08	Drom & Inch	Tipperary	1-07
2020	Drom & Inch	Tipperary	1-09	Inagh-Kilnamona	Clare	1-08
2019	Scariff Ogonnelloe	Clare	1-07	Drom & Inch	Tipperary	0-08
2018	Inniscarra	Cork	2-09	Inagh-Kilnamona	Clare	0-07
2017	Burgess Duharra	Tipperary	2–10	Inagh-Kilnamona	Clare	1–10
2016	Burgess Duharra	Tipperary	2–10	Inniscarra	Cork	0-06
2015	Milford	Cork	5–18	Newmarket-on-Fergus	Clare	1-09
2014	Milford	Cork	0–14	Granagh-Ballingarry	Limerick	0-06
2013	Milford	Cork	0–14	Granagh-Ballingarry	Limerick	0-04
2012	Milford	Cork	1-07	Burgess Duharra	Tipperary	0-06
2011	Drom & Inch	Tipperary	5-08	Douglas	Cork	2–13
2010	Inniscarra	Cork	0–10	Granagh-Ballingarry	Limerick	0-07
2009	Cashel	Tipperary	4-20	St Catherine's	Cork	0–12
2008	Drom & Inch	Tipperary	2-08	Douglas	Cork	1-05
2007	Cashel	Tipperary	3–16	Killeedy	Limerick	1–10
2006	Cashel	Tipperary	3-24	Kilnamona	Clare	1-06
2005	Cashel	Tipperary	4–13	Killeedy	Limerick	2-04
2004	Granagh-Ballingarry	Limerick	2-08	Milford	Cork	2-06
2003	Granagh-Ballingarry	Limerick	0–17	Drom & Inch	Tipperary	0–9
2002	Cashel	Tipperary	4–12	Cloughduv	Cork	0–4
2001	Cashel	Tipperary	0–9	Granagh-Ballingarry	Limerick	0–6
2000	Granagh-Ballingarry	Limerick	3–10	Bishopstown	Cork	1–5
1999	Granagh-Ballingarry	Limerick	0–12	Cashel	Tipperary	0–4
1998	Granagh-Ballingarry	Limerick	1–17	Cashel	Tipperary	2–5
1997	Granagh-Ballingarry	Limerick	3–11	Toomevara	Tipperary	0–13
1996	Granagh-Ballingarry	Limerick	5–8	Glen Rovers	Cork	0–8
1995	Toomevara	Tipperary	4–13	Wolfe Tones	Clare	0–14
1994	Glen Rovers	Cork	2–11	Wolfe Tones	Clare	1–2
1993	Glen Rovers	Cork	5–11	Wolfe Tones	Clare	0–2
1992	Glen Rovers	Cork	2–13	Sixmilebridge	Clare	2–3
1991	Glen Rovers	Cork	6–9	Cashel	Tipperary	4–7
1990	Glen Rovers	Cork	3–8	Sixmilebridge	Clare	2-2
1989	Sixmilebridge	Clare	3–7	Cashel	Tipperary	1–12
1988	Killeagh	Cork	2–5	Sixmilebridge	Clare	1–7
1987	Glen Rovers	Cork	10–19	Cashel	Tipperary	0–2
1986	Glen Rovers	Cork	3–12	Granagh-Ballingarry	Limerick	0–3
1985	Eire Óg, Cork	Cork	2–10	Portroe	Tipperary	4–1
1984	Killeagh	Cork	7–13	Ardkeen	Waterford	0–3
1983	Croagh-Kilfinny	Limerick	3–6	Sixmilebridge	Clare	2–1
1982	Killeagh	Cork	1–7	Old Christians	Limerick	1–5
1981	Killeagh	Cork	4–6	Cashel	Tipperary	0–2
1980	Killeagh	Cork	4–6	Éire Óg, Ennis	Clare	2–0
1979	Ballyagran	Limerick	4–5	Shannon	Clare	1–3
1978	Ballyagran	Limerick	4–3	Éire Óg, Ennis	Clare	1-1
1977	Ballyagran	Limerick	4–1	Eire Óg, Cork	Cork	3–1
1976	Ahane	Limerick	4–3	Drom & Inch	Tipperary	1–3
1975	Croagh-Kilfinny	Limerick	2–0	Drom & Inch	Tipperary	0–4
1974	U.C.C	Cork	1–0	Éire Óg, Ennis	Clare	0–1
1973	Thurles	Tipperary	4–5	Ahane	Limerick	0–1
1972	Ahane	Limerick	3–4	Éire Óg, Ennis	Clare	3-3
1971	Thurles	Tipperary	4-4	Ahane	Limerick	3–1
1970	South Presentation P.P	Cork	3–4	Ahane	Limerick	2–0
1969	Ahane	Limerick	3–4	South Presentation P.P	Cork	1–5
1968	Ahane	Limerick	3–2	Glen Rovers	Cork	2–3
1967	Glen Rovers	Cork	7–4	Ahane	Limerick	1-1
1966	St Patrick's, Glengoole	Tipperary	5–16	Croagh-Kilfinny	Limerick	1–2
1965	St Patrick's, Glengoole	Tipperary	4–7	Glen Rovers	Cork	4–1
1964	Glen Rovers	Cork	11–1	Croagh-Kilfinny	Limerick	1–0

== Munster Intermediate Club Camogie Championship ==
=== Roll of honour ===
#	Club	County	Titles	Runners-up	Years won	Years runners-up
1	Lismore	Waterford	5	1	2010, 2011, 2013, 2014, 2017	2015
1	Gailltír	Waterford	5	0	2016, 2018, 2019, 2020, 2021	
3	Clanmaurice	Kerry	3	0	2022, 2023, 2024	
4	Kilmaley	Clare	1	0	2012	
4	Cahir	Tipperary	1	0	2015	
4	Ballincollig	Cork	1	0	2025	
4	Boherlahan-Dualla	Tipperary	1	0	2026	
8	Newmarket-on-Fergus	Clare	0	2		2010, 2013
8	Clonoulty-Rossmore	Tipperary	0	1		2011
8	St Anne's	Waterford	0	1		2012
8	Sarsfields	Cork	0	1		2014
8	Nenagh Éire Óg	Tipperary	0	1		2016
8	Newcestown	Cork	0	1		2017
8	Éire Óg	Cork	0	1		2018
8	Toomevara	Tipperary	0	1		2019
8	Thurles Sarsfields	Tipperary	0	1		2020
8	Knockavilla Donaskeigh Kickhams	Tipperary	0	1		2021
8	Aghabullogue	Cork	0	1		2022
8	Shannon Rovers	Tipperary	0	1		2023
8	Ballinora	Cork	0	1		2024
8	Moycarkey-Borris	Tipperary	0	1		2025
8	Ballinhassig	Cork	0	1		2026

=== List of finals ===
Year	Winner	County	Score	Opponent	County	Score
2026	Boherlahan-Dualla	Tipperary	3-14	Ballinhassig	Cork	2-09
2025	Ballincollig	Cork	2-07	Moycarkey-Borris	Tipperary	1-05
2024	Clanmaurice	Kerry	2-14	Ballinora	Cork	1-12
2023	Clanmaurice	Kerry	1-14 (AET)	Shannon Rovers	Tipperary	2-07
2022	Clanmaurice	Kerry	2-09	Aghabullogue	Cork	1-08
2021	Gailltír	Waterford	1-11	Knockavilla Donaskeigh Kickhams	Tipperary	0-11
2020	Gailltír	Waterford	1-11	Thurles Sarsfields	Tipperary	0-09
2019	Gailltír	Waterford	2-17	Toomevara	Tipperary	1-11
2018	Gailltír	Waterford	2-10	Éire Óg	Cork	0-06
2017	Lismore	Waterford	1-10	Newcestown	Cork	0-08
2016	Gailltír	Waterford	1-15	Nenagh Éire Óg	Tipperary	4-05
2015	Cahir	Tipperary	2-10	Lismore	Waterford	0-08
2014	Lismore	Waterford	2-07	Sarsfields	Cork	0-05
2013	Lismore	Waterford	0-08	Newmarket-on-Fergus	Clare	0-05
2012	Kilmaley	Clare	4-10	St Anne's	Waterford	0-03
2011	Lismore	Waterford	5-16	Clonoulty-Rossmore	Tipperary	2-11
2010	Lismore	Waterford	5-05	Newmarket-on-Fergus	Clare	0-11

== Munster Junior Club Camogie Championship ==
=== Roll of Honour ===
#	Club	County	Titles	Runners-up	Years won	Years runners-up
1	Clanmaurice	Kerry	7	0	2014, 2015, 2017, 2018, 2019, 2020, 2021	
2	Newmarket-on-Fergus	Clare	2	0	2005, 2007	
2	Scariff/Ogonnelloe	Clare	2	0	2013, 2016	
4	St Joseph’s Doora/Barefield	Clare	1	1	2023	2019
4	Kilmaley	Clare	1	0	2008	
4	St Anne's	Waterford	1	0	2009	
4	Corofin	Clare	1	0	2010	
4	Inagh	Clare	1	0	2011	
4	Truagh/Clonlara	Clare	1	0	2012	
4	Adare	Limerick	1	0	2022	
4	Modeligo	Waterford	1	0	2024	
4	Patrickswell	Limerick	1	0	2025	
4	Templeglantine	Limerick	1	0	2026	
14	An Rinn	Waterford	0	3		2011, 2012, 2021
14	Murroe Boher	Limerick	0	2		2014, 2015
14	Croydon	London	0	1		2005
14	Gailltir	Waterford	0	1		2008
14	Clonakilty	Cork	0	1		2009
14	Cappoquin	Waterford	0	1		2010
14	Butlerstown	Waterford	0	1		2013
14	De La Salle	Waterford	0	1		2016
14	Na Piarsaigh	Limerick	0	1		2017
14	Crecora	Limerick	0	1		2018
14	Feakle Killanena	Clare	0	1		2020
14	Brickey Rangers	Waterford	0	1		2022
14	Monaleen	Limerick	0	1		2023
14	Croagh-Kilfinny	Limerick	0	1		2024
14	Clooney-Quin	Clare	0	1		2025
14	Cillard	Kerry	0	1		2026

=== List of finals ===
Year	Winner	County	Score	Opponent	County	Score
2026	Templeglantine	Limerick	3-12	Cillard	Kerry	4-06
2025	Patrickswell	Limerick	2-15	Clooney-Quin	Clare	1-05
2024	Modeligo	Waterford	2-05	Croagh-Kilfinny	Limerick	0-10
2023	St Joseph’s Doora/Barefield	Clare	4-07 (a.e.t.)	Monaleen	Limerick	0-18
2022	Adare	Limerick	1-09	Brickey Rangers	Waterford	0-08
2021	Clanmaurice	Kerry	0-09	An Rinn	Waterford	0-05
2020	Clanmaurice	Kerry	2-06	Feakle Killanena	Clare	0-09
2019	Clanmaurice	Kerry	2-11	St Joseph’s Doora/Barefield	Clare	1-06
2018	Clanmaurice	Kerry	1-11	Crecora	Limerick	1-08
2017	Clanmaurice	Kerry	2-11	Na Piarsaigh	Limerick	1-04
2016	Scariff/Ogonnelloe	Clare	2-19	De La Salle	Waterford	0-15
2015	Clanmaurice	Kerry	2-07	Murroe Boher	Limerick	1-05
2014	Clanmaurice	Kerry	3-07	Murroe Boher	Limerick	0-05
2013	Scariff/Ogonnelloe	Clare	2-16	Butlerstown	Waterford	0-03
2012	Truagh/Clonlara	Clare	2-06	An Rinn	Waterford	1-07
2011	Inagh	Clare	1-13	An Rinn	Waterford	1-02
2010	Corofin	Clare	2-12	Cappoquin	Waterford	1-04
2009	St Anne's	Waterford	3-06	Clonakilty	Cork	0-09
2008	Kilmaley	Clare		Gailltir	Waterford	
2007	Newmarket-on-Fergus	Clare				
2006						
2005	Newmarket-on-Fergus	Clare	6-16	Croydon	London	1-03

== See also ==
- All-Ireland Senior Club Camogie Championship
- Leinster Senior Club Camogie Championship
- Ulster Senior Club Camogie Championship
- Galway Senior Camogie Championship
