= Leinster Senior Club Camogie Championship =

Camogie competition in Ireland

- Irish: Craobh Laighean
- Code: Camogie
- Founded: 1964; 62 years ago
- Region: Leinster (GAA)
- Title holders: Dicksboro (3rd title)
- Most titles: St Paul's (13 titles)
- Official website: Official website

The Leinster Senior Club Camogie Championship is an annual camogie competition organised by the Leinster Council of the Camogie Association and contested by the champion senior clubs in the province of Leinster in Ireland. It is the most prestigious club competition in Leinster camogie.

The winner of the Leinster championship contests the semi-final of the All-Ireland Senior Club Camogie Championship.

The championship was first contested in 1964.

The competition has been won by 17 teams, 11 of which have won it more than once. Kilkenny clubs have accumulated the highest number of victories with 26 wins. St Paul's of Kilkenny is the most successful team in the tournament's history, having won it 13 times.

No club from counties other than Dublin, Kilkenny, and Wexford has ever won the championship. The last time a final was contested by a club from another county was in 1997, when Camross of Laois were defeated by Lisdowney of Kilkenny.

Dicksboro are the reigning champions, having beaten St. Martin's (Wexford) by 1-10 to 1-07 in the 2026 final.

== Titles listed by club ==
#	Club	County	Wins	Runners Up	Years won	Years runners up
1	St Paul's	Kilkenny	13	7	1966, 1968, 1969, 1970, 1973, 1974, 1976, 1977, 1986, 1987, 1988, 1989, 1990	1967, 1971, 1972, 1978, 1980, 1981, 1982
2	Buffers Alley	Wexford	8	5	1975, 1978, 1979, 1980, 1981, 1982, 1983, 1984	1977, 1985, 1987, 1988, 1994
2	Oulart–The Ballagh	Wexford	8	5	2009, 2010, 2011, 2012, 2014, 2015, 2020, 2021	2003, 2005, 2007, 2022, 2025
4	St Lachtain's	Kilkenny	6	4	1999, 2003, 2004, 2005, 2006, 2007	1998, 2000, 2001, 2009
5	Rathnure	Wexford	4	4	1992, 1995, 1996, 2000	1989, 1991, 1999, 2008
5	St Vincents	Dublin	4	3	1998, 2019, 2022, 2024	2015, 2016, 2023
7	Dicksboro	Kilkenny	3	1	2023, 2025, 2026	2021
7	Lisdowney	Kilkenny	3	2	1993, 1994, 1997	1992, 1996
7	St Ibars	Wexford	3	2	1965, 2001, 2002	1966, 2013
9	Thomastown	Kilkenny	2	3	2016, 2017	2014, 2018, 2020
9	Celtic	Dublin	2	3	1964, 1991	1973, 1976, 1979
9	Austin Stacks	Dublin	2	2	1971, 1972	1970, 1974
12	Ballyboden St Enda's	Dublin	1	4	2008	2006, 2010, 2011, 2012
12	St Martin's	Wexford	1	3	2018	2017, 2019, 2026
12	Crumlin	Dublin	1	1	1985	1986
12	Eoghan Ruadh	Dublin	1	1	1967	1969
12	Mullinavat	Kilkenny	1	0	2013	
18	Myshall	Carlow	0	2		1983, 1995
18	Marino	Dublin	0	2		1990, 1993
18	Piltown	Kilkenny	0	1		2024
18	Good Counsel	Dublin	0	1		2004
18	Camross	Laois	0	1		1997
18	Avoca	Wicklow	0	1		1984
18	Prosperous	Kildare	0	1		1975
18	Ardclough	Kildare	0	1		1968
18	St. Colman's	Offaly	0	1		1964

=== Titles by county ===
County	Titles	Runners-up	Total
Kilkenny	28	19	47
Wexford	24	19	43
Dublin	11	17	28
Carlow	0	2	2
Kildare	0	2	2
Laois	0	1	1
Offaly	0	1	1
Wicklow	0	1	1

== Finals Listed By Year ==
Year	Winner	County	Score	Opponent	County	Score
2026	Dicksboro	Kilkenny	1-10	St Martin's	Wexford	1-07
2025	Dicksboro	Kilkenny	0-17	Oulart the Ballagh	Wexford	1-13
2024	St Vincents	Dublin	2-12	Piltown	Kilkenny	1-13
2023	Dicksboro	Kilkenny	0-12	St Vincents	Dublin	1-07
2022	St Vincents	Dublin	1-09	Oulart–The Ballagh	Wexford	0-11
2021	Oulart–The Ballagh	Wexford	1-13	Dicksboro	Kilkenny	3-05
2020	Oulart–The Ballagh	Wexford	1-11	Thomastown	Kilkenny	1-07
2019	St Vincents	Dublin	2-11	St Martin's	Wexford	2-09
2018	St Martin's	Wexford	2-10	Thomastown	Kilkenny	1-06
2017	Thomastown	Kilkenny	0-16	St Martin's	Wexford	3-06
2016	Thomastown	Kilkenny	1-07	St Vincents	Dublin	0-08
2015	Oulart–The Ballagh	Wexford	0-12	St Vincents	Dublin	2-05
2014	Oulart–The Ballagh	Wexford	3-09	Thomastown	Kilkenny	1-05
2013	Mullinavat	Kilkenny	3-12	St Ibars	Wexford	3-10
2012	Oulart–The Ballagh	Wexford	3-06	Ballyboden St Enda's	Dublin	1-04
2011	Oulart–The Ballagh	Wexford	2-12	Ballyboden St Enda's	Dublin	1-04
2010	Oulart–The Ballagh	Wexford	2-09	Ballyboden St Enda's	Dublin	1-09
2009	Oulart–The Ballagh	Wexford	3-14	St Lachtain's	Kilkenny	1-06
2008	Ballyboden St Enda's	Dublin	3-3	Rathnure	Wexford	1-7
2007	St Lachtain's	Kilkenny	2-6	Oulart–The Ballagh	Wexford	0-10
2006	St Lachtain's	Kilkenny	1-9	Ballyboden St Enda's	Dublin	1-6
2005	St Lachtain's	Kilkenny	3-11	Oulart–The Ballagh	Wexford	0-8
2004	St Lachtain's	Kilkenny	4-14	Good Counsel	Dublin	0-2
2003	St Lachtain's	Kilkenny	3-5	Oulart–The Ballagh	Wexford	0-8
2002	St Ibars	Wexford	4-10	St Brigid's (Ballycallan)	Kilkenny	1-7
2001	St Ibars	Wexford		St Lachtain's	Kilkenny	
2000	Rathnure	Wexford	1-5	St Lachtain's	Kilkenny	0-7
1999	St Lachtain's	Kilkenny		Rathnure	Wexford	
1998	St Vincents	Dublin	1-14	St Lachtain's	Kilkenny	2-8
1997	Lisdowney	Kilkenny	4-17	Camross	Laois	2-7
1996	Rathnure	Wexford	6-11	Lisdowney	Kilkenny	2-10
1995	Rathnure	Wexford	5-18	Myshall	Carlow	2-3
1994	Lisdowney	Kilkenny	4-12	Buffers Alley	Wexford	2-5
1993	Lisdowney	Kilkenny	6-6	Marino	Dublin	4-8
1992	Rathnure	Wexford	2-8	Lisdowney	Kilkenny	0-8
1991	Celtic	Dublin	5-8	Rathnure	Wexford	1-4
1990	St Paul's	Kilkenny	5-8	Marino	Dublin	3-4
1989	St Paul's	Kilkenny	4-16	Rathnure	Wexford	2-10
1988	St Paul's	Kilkenny		Buffers Alley	Wexford	
1987	St Paul's	Kilkenny	6-11	Buffers Alley	Wexford	1-6
1986	St Paul's	Kilkenny	3-6	Crumlin	Dublin	1-7
1985	Crumlin	Dublin	4-7	Buffers Alley	Wexford	1-0
1984	Buffers Alley	Wexford	4-2	Avoca	Wicklow	1-0
1983	Buffers Alley	Wexford	4-4	Myshall	Carlow	0-3
1982	Buffers Alley	Wexford	w/o	St Paul's	Kilkenny	scr
1981	Buffers Alley	Wexford	4-4	St Paul's	Kilkenny	1-4
1980	Buffers Alley	Wexford	1-4	St Paul's	Kilkenny	0-4
1979	Buffers Alley	Wexford	4-7	Celtic	Dublin	3-2
1978	Buffers Alley	Wexford	1-3	St Paul's	Kilkenny	1-2
1977	St Paul's	Kilkenny	5-1	Buffers Alley	Wexford	2-4
1976	St Paul's	Kilkenny	3-6	Celtic	Dublin	2-1
1975	Buffers Alley	Wexford	4-10	Prosperous	Kildare	0-1
1974	St Paul's	Kilkenny	3-8	Austin Stacks	Dublin	1-3
1973	St Paul's	Kilkenny	3-3	Celtic	Dublin	2-0
1972	Austin Stacks	Dublin	4-3	St Paul's	Kilkenny	2-2
1971	Austin Stacks	Dublin	4-2	St Paul's	Kilkenny	4-1
1970	St Paul's	Kilkenny	4-0	Austin Stacks	Dublin	1-3
1969	St Paul's	Kilkenny	8-3	Eoghan Ruadh	Dublin	2-2
1968	St Paul's	Kilkenny	13-2	Ardclough	Kildare	0-1
1967	Eoghan Ruadh	Dublin	2-5	St Paul's	Kilkenny	2-2
1966	St Paul's	Kilkenny	4-5	St Ibars	Wexford	4-1
1965	St Ibars	Wexford				
1964	Celtic	Dublin	3-6	St Colman's	Offaly	0-0

== Leinster Intermediate Club Camogie Championship ==
=== Roll of honour ===
#	Club	County	Wins	Runners Up	Years won	Years runners up
1	St Rynagh's	Offaly	4	0	2018, 2019, 2020, 2021	
2	The Harps	Laois	2	0	2010, 2011	
3	Myshall	Carlow	1	4	2016	2015, 2017, 2021, 2022
3	Camross	Laois	1	3	2025	2013, 2014, 2019
3	Na Fianna	Meath	1	1	2023	2025
3	Rower-Inistioge	Kilkenny	1	0	2012	
3	Ballyhale Shamrocks	Kilkenny	1	0	2013	
3	Piltown	Kilkenny	1	0	2014	
3	Tullaroan	Kilkenny	1	0	2015	
3	Johnstownbridge	Kildare	1	0	2017	
3	James Stephens	Kilkenny	1	0	2022	
3	St Brigid's	Laois	1	0	2024	
13	Shinrone	Offaly	0	2		2012, 2016
13	Lisdowney	Kilkenny	0	1		2010
13	Dicksboro	Kilkenny	0	1		2011
13	Young Ireland's	Kilkenny	0	1		2018
13	Celbridge	Kildare	0	1		2020
13	O'Moores	Laois	0	1		2023
13	Naas	Kildare	0	1		2024

=== Finals listed by year ===
Year	Winner	County	Score	Opponent	County	Score
2025	Camross	Laois	5-07	Na Fianna	Meath	1-07
2024	St Brigid's	Laois	1-10	Naas	Kildare	1-09
2023	Na Fianna	Meath	1-11	O'Moores	Laois	1-09
2022	James Stephens	Kilkenny	1-07	Myshall	Carlow	0-05
2021	St Rynagh's	Offaly	6-08	Myshall	Carlow	1-05
2020	St Rynagh's	Offaly	0-15	Celbridge	Kildare	0-11
2019	St Rynagh's	Offaly	4-23	Camross	Laois	0-04
2018	St Rynagh's	Offaly	2-13	Young Ireland's	Kilkenny	1-10
2017	Johnstownbridge	Kildare	2-09	Myshall	Carlow	1-08
2016	Myshall	Carlow	0-11	Shinrone	Offaly	1-06
2015	Tullaroan	Kilkenny	0-08	Myshall	Carlow	1-04
2014	Piltown	Kilkenny	3-10	Camross	Laois	4-05
2013	Ballyhale Shamrocks	Kilkenny	3-03	Camross	Laois	1-04
2012	Rower-Inistioge	Kilkenny	3-12	Shinrone	Offaly	2-08
2011	The Harps	Laois	0-10	Dicksboro	Kilkenny	0-05
2010	The Harps	Laois	0-12	Lisdowney	Kilkenny	1-07

== Leinster Junior Club Camogie Championship ==
=== Roll of Honour ===
#	Club	County	Wins	Runners Up	Years won	Years runners up
1	Kilmessan	Meath	4	4	2010, 2014, 2017, 2018	2003, 2012, 2015, 2016
2	Raharney	Westmeath	3	2	2019, 2020, 2021	2017, 2018
2	The Harps	Laois	3	1	2006, 2007, 2008	2023
2	Myshall	Carlow	3	0	2011, 2012, 2013	
2	Knockananna	Wicklow	3	0	2022, 2023, 2024	
6	Johnstownbridge	Kildare	2	1	2015, 2016	2013
7	Killyon	Meath	1	0	1996	
7	Drumcullen	Offaly	1	0	2003	
7	Galmoy	Kilkenny	1	0	2004	
7	Dunboyne	Meath	1	0	2025	
7	Crookedwood	Westmeath	1	0	2026	
12	Celbridge	Kildare	0	2		2010, 2020
12	Trumera	Laois	0	1		2004
12	Lough Lene Gaels	Westmeath	0	1		2011
12	Donard Glen	Wicklow	0	1		2014
12	Kilcormac/Killoughey	Offaly	0	1		2019
12	Tullamore	Offaly	0	1		2021
12	Maynooth	Kildare	0	1		2022
12	Navan	Meath	0	1		2024
12	St Lazarian's	Laois	0	1		2025
12	Clough/Ballacolla	Laois	0	1		2026

=== Finals listed by year ===
Year	Winner	County	Score	Opponent	County	Score
2026	Crookedwood	Westmeath	1-09	Clough/Ballacolla	Laois	0-10
2025	Dunboyne	Meath	0-12	St Lazarian's	Laois	1-08
2024	Knockananna	Wicklow	2-13	Navan	Meath	2-08
2023	Knockananna	Wicklow	3-09	The Harps	Laois	2-06
2022	Knockananna	Wicklow	3-07	Maynooth	Kildare	1-05
2021	Raharney	Westmeath	3-09	Tullamore	Offaly	1-06
2020	Raharney	Westmeath	4-16	Celbridge	Kildare	2-06
2019	Raharney	Westmeath	3-11	Kilcormac/Killoughey	Offaly	2-05
2018	Kilmessan	Meath	1-13	Raharney	Westmeath	2-09
2017	Kilmessan	Meath	2-07	Raharney	Westmeath	1-09
2016	Johnstownbridge	Kildare	1-13	Kilmessan	Meath	0-10
2015	Johnstownbridge	Kildare		Kilmessan	Meath	
2014	Kilmessan	Meath	6-21	Donard Glen	Wicklow	1-02
2013	Myshall	Carlow	2-09	Johnstownbridge	Kildare	2-06
2012	Myshall	Carlow		Kilmessan	Meath	
2011	Myshall	Carlow	2-05	Lough Lene Gaels	Westmeath	1-04
2010	Kilmessan	Meath		Celbridge	Kildare	
2009						
2008	The Harps	Laois				
2007	The Harps	Laois				
2006	The Harps	Laois				
2005						
2004	Galmoy	Kilkenny	0-14	Trumera	Laois	0-08
2003	Drumcullen	Offaly		Kilmessan	Meath	
2002						
2001						
2000						
1999						
1998						
1997						
1996	Killyon	Meath				

== See also ==
- All-Ireland Senior Club Camogie Championship
- Munster Senior Club Camogie Championship
- Ulster Senior Club Camogie Championship
- Galway Senior Camogie Championship
