= Íbar of Killibar Beg =

Íbar is the name of a very obscure early Irish saint, after whom Killibar Beg – noted in the Episcopal Rental of Clonfert, c. 1351 – in County Galway is named. The original form would have been Cill Íbar ('the church of Íbar'). Killibar Beg exists as a placename in the townland of Liscuib, Ballymacward, County Galway. Nothing further is known of Íbar, beyond that he would have been active as an evangelist among the Soghain of Connacht during or after the lifetime of Kerrill.

== See also ==
- Soghain
- Conainne
- St Connell
- Kerrill
- Uí Maine
- Grellan
