= Kilconnell (barony) =

Barony in County Galway, Ireland

Kilconnell Cill Chonaill (Irish)
- Barony
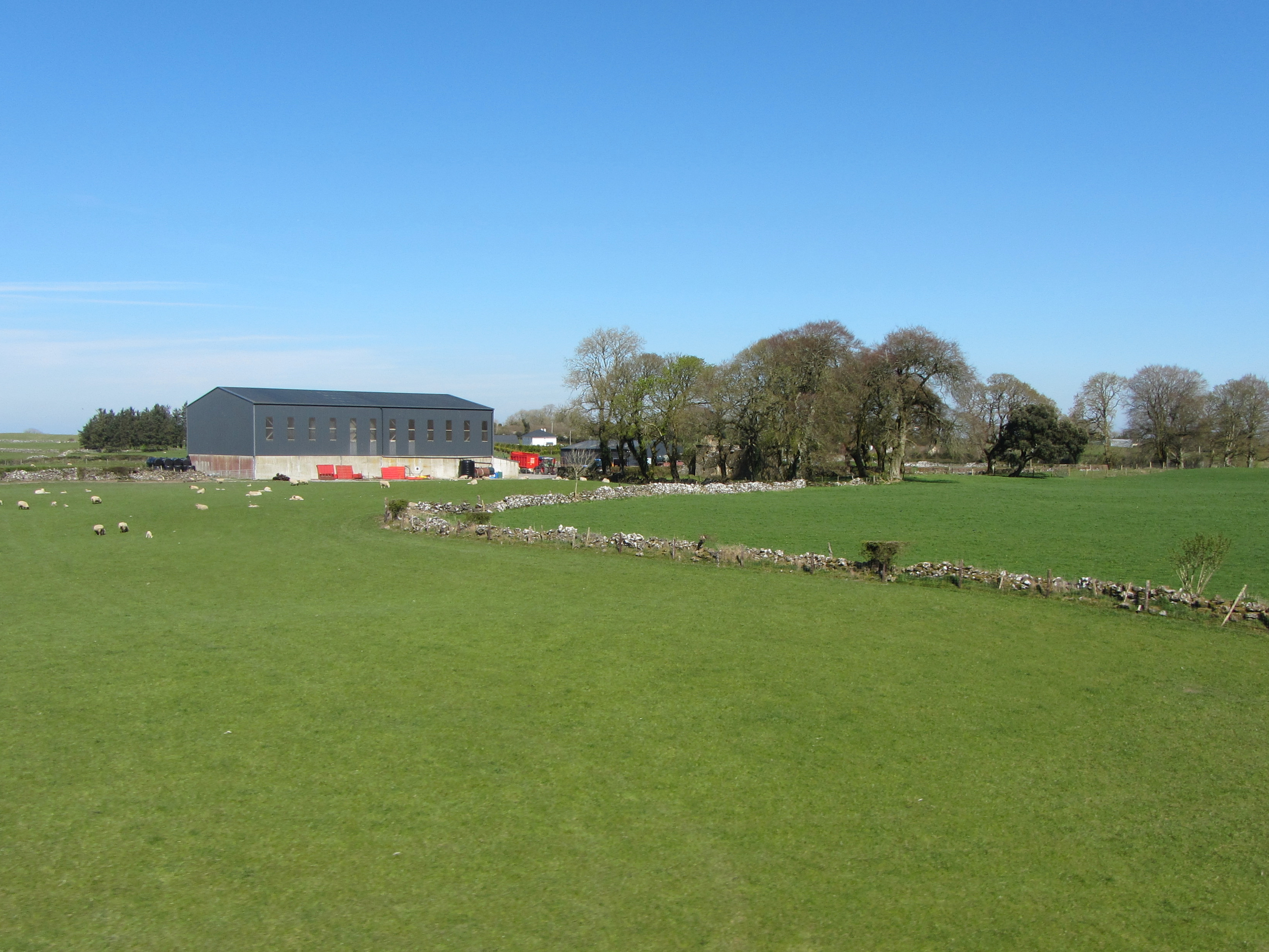
- Farm in Carrowmanagh

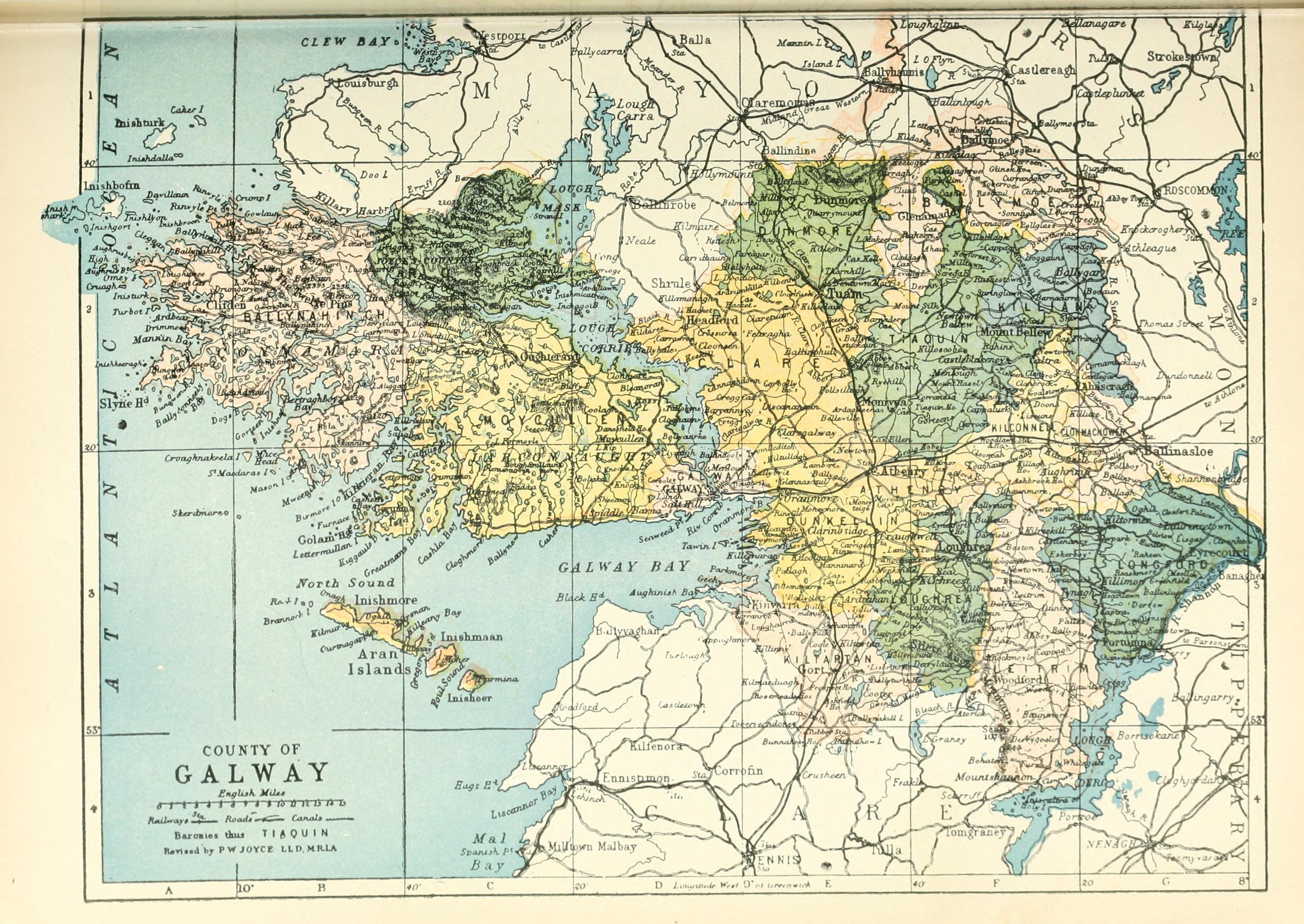
- Barony map of County Galway, 1900; Kilconnell is in the east, coloured yellow.

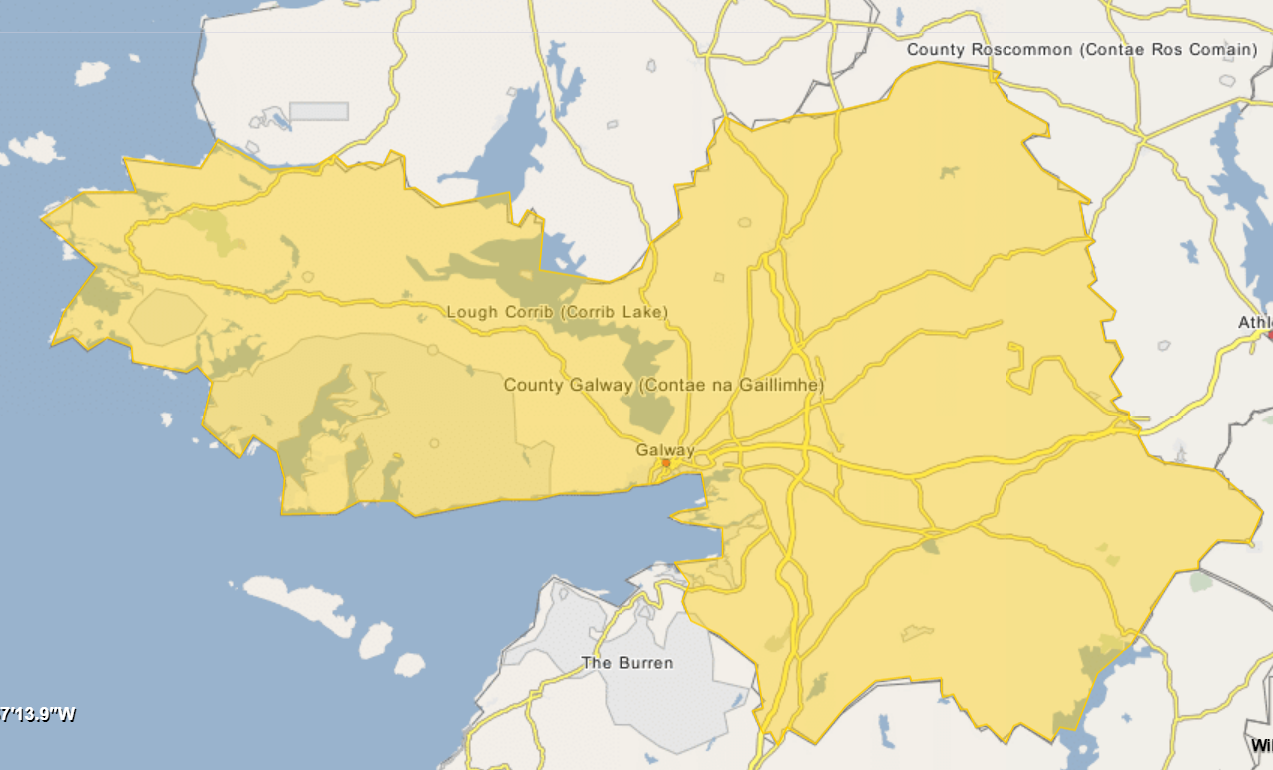
- Location within County Galway
- Coordinates: 53°20′N 8°28′W
- Sovereign state: Ireland
- Province: Connacht
- County: Galway

Area
  - Total: 262.3 km^{2} (101.3 sq mi)

Kilconnell (Irish: Cill Chonaill) is a historical barony in eastern County Galway, Ireland.

Baronies were mainly cadastral rather than administrative units. They acquired modest local taxation and spending functions in the 19th century before being superseded by the Local Government (Ireland) Act 1898.

== History ==
The name derived from Irish Cill Chonaill, "Conall's church," which refers to the monastery at Kilconnell Abbey, possibly originally named for Conainne, who was later confused with Conal, who founded a monastery in Drum, County Roscommon.

This region was part of the territory of Uí Maine and was ruled in the Gaelic Irish period by the Donnellans. The Caladah (callows) region was ruled by MacGilduffs and O'Leahys.

Kilconnell barony was created before 1574.

== Geography ==
Kilconnell is in the east of the county north of the Raford River. It contains the lakes of Loughaunnavaag and Callow Lough.

== List of settlements ==
Settlements within the historical barony of Kilconnell include:

- Aughrim
- Cappataggle
- Kilconnell
- Killimor
- Kiltullagh
- New Inn
- Woodlawn
