= Brandubh of Tynagh =

Brandubh of Tynagh, fl. c. 500 AD, Irish missionary.

Brandubh is listed the Irish genealogies as Brandamh Tighe nEathach m. Eachach m. Ainmireach m. Aengusa m. Lomáin (Brandugh of Tynagh son of Eochu son of Ainmire son of Aonghus son of Lomáin'). He founded the church of Tynagh sometime around 500 AD. Evidence suggests that Tynagh was originally a cult centre for the festival of Lughnasa, later Christianised by Brandubh, who was cited as Lugh's son, thus betraying its true origins. From about the 8th to the 17th centuries the region Tynagh is located was known as Síol Anmchadha.

== See also ==
- Conainne
- St Connell
- Kerrill
- Téach
- Martyrology of Tallaght
