= Laisren of Cloonkerrill =

Laisren of Cloonkerrill may be the St Laisrén or Molaissi of the Soghain, whose pedigree is given as "Laisren mac Colmain mac Luchtai mac Findcha mac Feidlimti mac Sogain mac Fiacha Araide." This would make him a close relative of Kerrill, Molua of Kilmoluagh and Cuana of Kilcoonagh, all of whom were active evangelists in the Soghain kingdom located in what is now central-east County Galway. This would place Laisren as living in the late fifth or early sixth centuries.

His name seems to have been perpetuated in the placename Laisrend, no longer extant but apparently located in the parish of Clonkeen.
