= Tiaquin =

Barony in County Galway, Ireland

Tiaquin Tigh Dachoinne (Irish)
- Barony
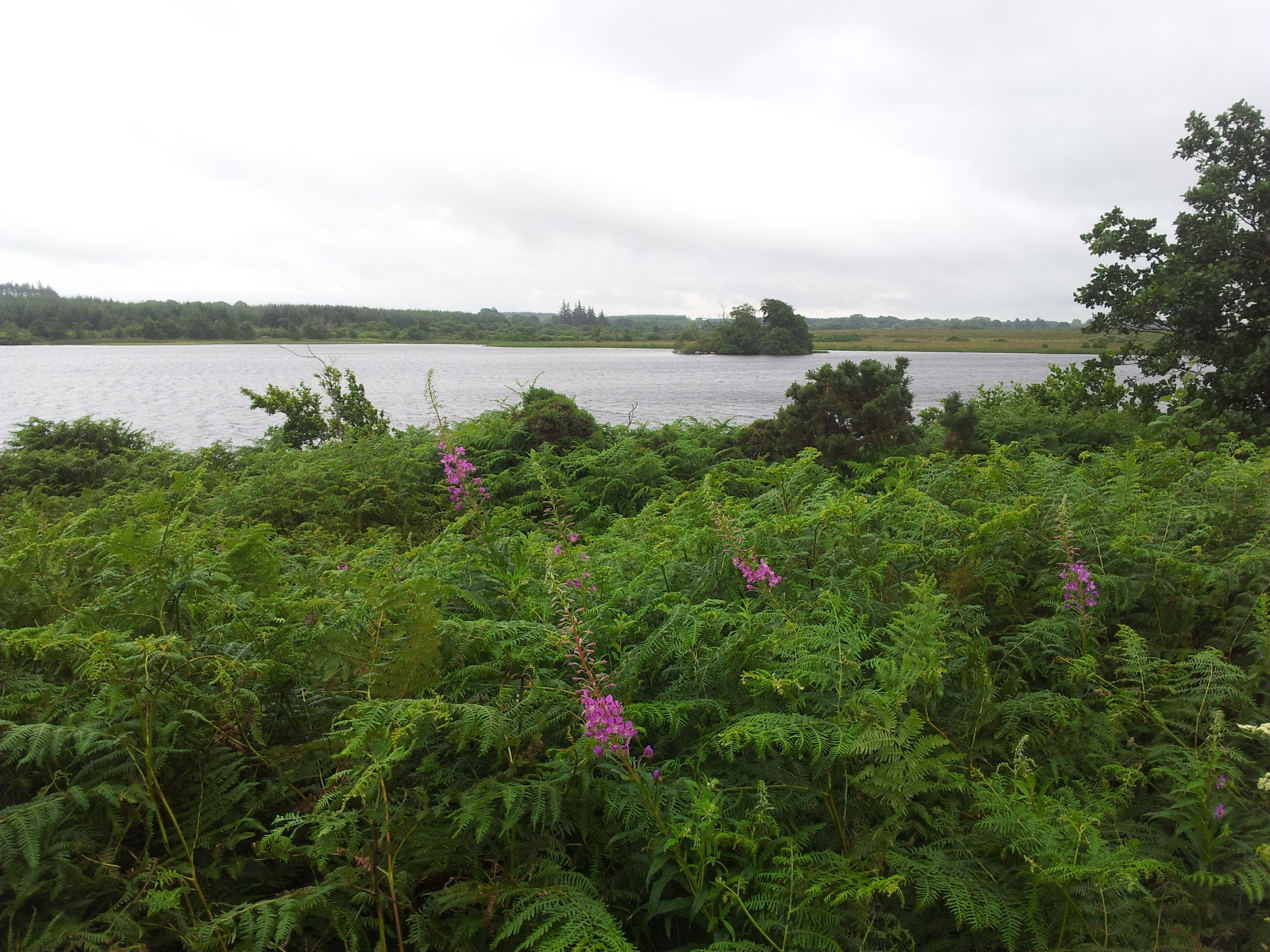
- Lough Nahinch near Menlough

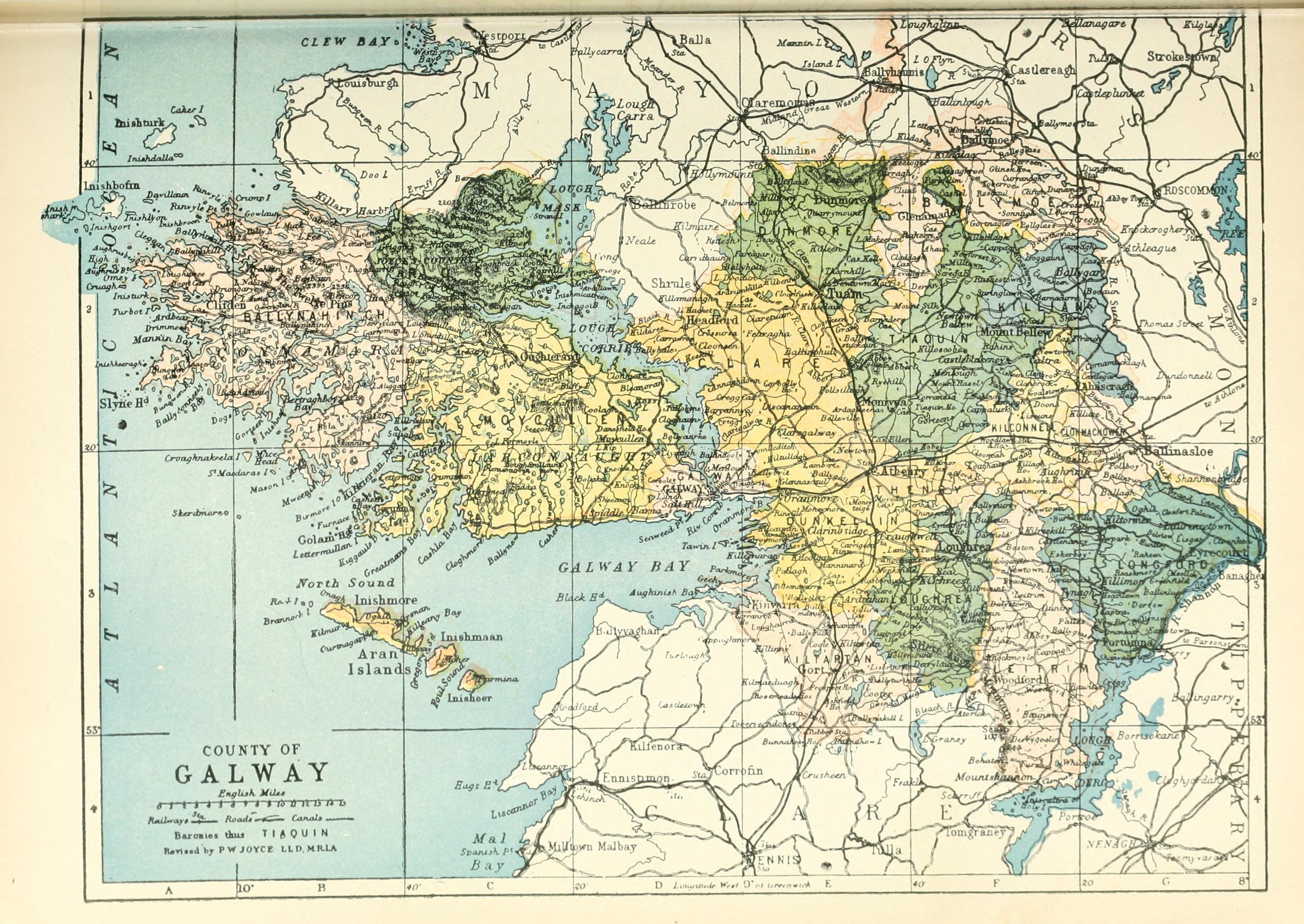
- Barony map of County Galway, 1900; Tiaquin is in the northeast, coloured green.

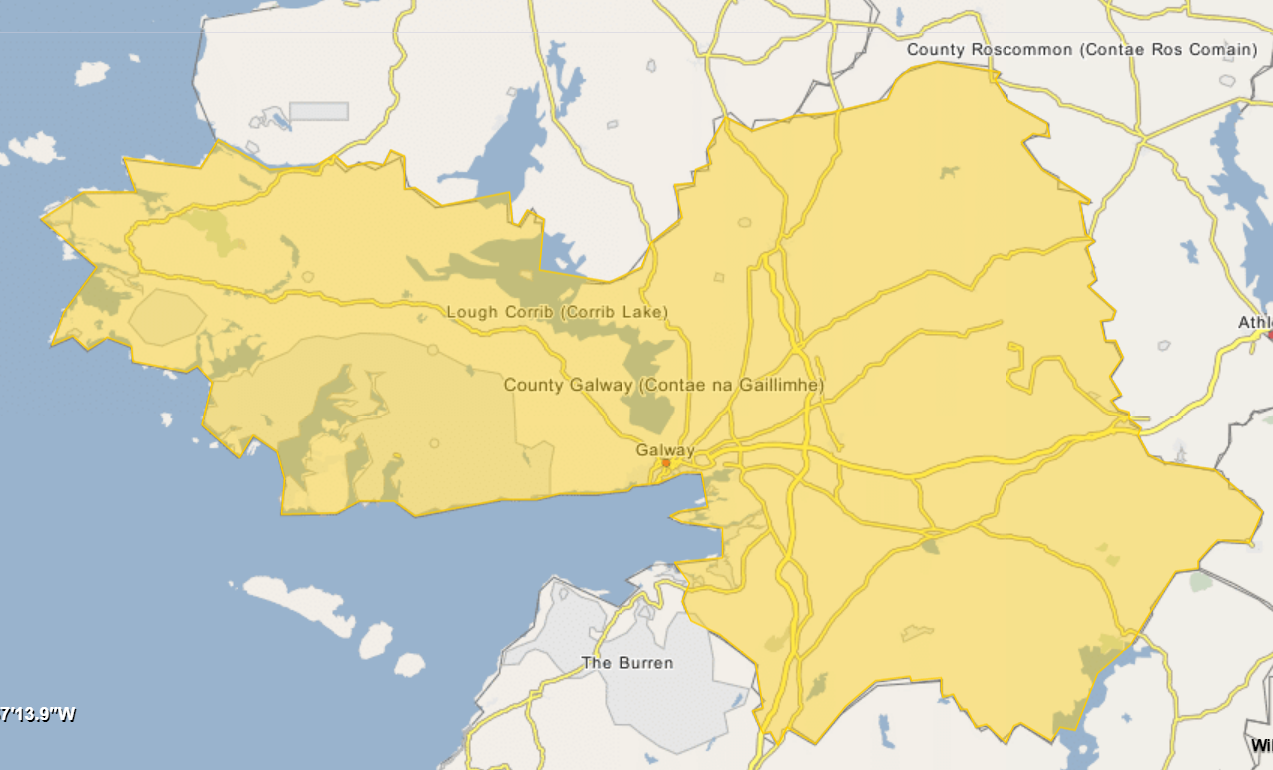
- Location within County Galway
- Coordinates: 53°29′N 8°34′W
- Sovereign state: Ireland
- Province: Connacht
- County: Galway

Area
  - Total: 445.7 km^{2} (172.1 sq mi)

Tiaquin (Irish: Tigh Dachoinne; English: /ˈtiːækwɪn/ TEE-a-kwin) is a historical barony in eastern County Galway, Ireland.

Baronies were mainly cadastral rather than administrative units. They acquired modest local taxation and spending functions in the 19th century before being superseded by the Local Government (Ireland) Act 1898.

== History ==
The barony takes its name from Tiaquin, to the east of Monivea; the name is from Irish Tigh Dachoinne, "(Saint) Conainne's house."

The kingdom of Uí Díarmata was in this region and was ruled by the Ó Con Cheanain (Concannons), based in Kilkerrin. A branch of the Soghain were in the Tiaquin area too.

Tiaquin barony was created before 1574.

== Geography ==
Tiaquin barony is in eastern County Galway, in an area with many bogs, woods and turloughs.

== List of settlements ==
Settlements within the historical barony of Tiaquin include:

- Abbeyknockmoy
- Ballymacward
- Barnaderg
- Boyounagh
- Caltra

- Gurteen
- Kilkerrin
- Menlough
- Monivea
- Moylough
