= Maeineann of Clonfert =

Saint Maeineann of Clonfert, Bishop of Clonfert, died 1 March 570 AD.

Maeineann was Bishop of Clonfert during the lifetime of St. Brendan, who had founded it in 553. He was survived by Brendan, who died as Abbot of Clonfert in 576. Maeineann is one of the earliest bishops listed within what is now County Galway; he can be ranked as among the second or third wave of early Christians in south Connacht, after Kerrill, Conainne and Saint Connell.

His feast day is celebrated on 1 March.
