= Modiúit =

Modiúit (fl. 6th century) was an early successor of Saint Kerrill, Bishop of the kingdom of Soghain in what is now County Galway.

Modiúit established a church at what is now Killamude, in the parish of Ballymacward. Killamude derives from Cill Modiúit ('the church of Modiúit'). Its foundations can still be seen in the townland of Killamude West. His feast day was celebrated on February 12, and is listed as such in the Martyrology of Tallaght and the Félire Óengusso. His diocese is thought to have been the extent of the Soghain kingdom.

== Sources ==
- Mannion, Joseph (2004). The Life, Legends and Legacy of Saint Kerrill: A Fifth-Century East Galway Evangelist. ISBN 0-9547698-1-3.
