= Maol =

Maol is a gaelic word which means "bald". It is found in geographic names in Scotland and Ireland. The anglicized name is Mull; the Breton equivalent is Moal, and Moel in Welsh, with the same meaning.

Il is also an old gaelic name or nickname for people.

== People ==
- Maol Choluim I, Earl of Lennox
- Maol Choluim II, Earl of Lennox
- Maol Choluim de Innerpeffray
- Maol Chosna
- Maol Domhnaich, Earl of Lennox
- Maol Eoin Ó Crechain
- Maol Muire Ó hÚigínn, Irish Catholic clergyman
- Maol Ruanaidh Cam Ó Cearbhaill (died 1329)
- Maol Ruanaidh mac Ruaidhrí Ó Dubhda
- Maol Sheachluinn na n-Uirsgéal Ó hUiginn

== Places ==
- Caisteal Maol ("bald castle"), Scotland

== Other ==
- MAOL table book
