= Ballinderry Park =

Georgian country house in County Galway, Ireland

- Baile an Daoire
- Interactive map of the Ballinderry Park area
- Former names: Ballinderry House

General information
- Status: Protected structure (Galway County Council)
- Type: Country house
- Architectural style: Georgian
- Location: Kilconnell, County Galway, Ireland
- Coordinates: 53.346°N 8.398°W
- Completed: c. 1740
- Renovated: 2001–2005

Technical details
- Material: Fieldstone with lime render
- Floor count: Two storeys over half-basement, with attic

Renovating team
- Architect: Jeremy Williams

Ballinderry Park (also known as Ballinderry House) is an early Georgian country house near Kilconnell in County Galway, Ireland. The house is situated between Kilconnell village, Ballinasloe and Loughrea. The house, which was built around 1740, is included on Galway County Council's Record of Protected Structures. While the house had fallen into ruin by the late 20th century, it was purchased and restored between 2001 and 2005.

== History ==
=== Mediaeval and early modern ownership ===
In the Middle Ages the land belonged to Kilconnell Friary. The land changed hands a few times after the dissolution of the monasteries. In time, it became the property of the Church of Ireland Diocese of Clonfert. The diocese leased it out for nearly three centuries.

=== Ward and Comyn tenures ===
Samuel Lewis wrote in 1837 that Ballinderry was the seat of J. Comyn. At the time of Griffith's Valuation, in the mid-19th century, Andrew Comyn held the lease from the Ecclesiastical Commissioners. The valuation set it at £16. Col. John Comyn lived in the house in 1894. Andrew N. Comyn owned it in 1906. The Comyn family had come into the lease in 1786. That year Sabina Ward, of the Wards of Ballymacward, married Andrew Comyn of Ryefield in County Roscommon. The Ward family had held the lease before her.

=== Decline ===
The Comyns left in the 1940s. The Irish Land Commission split the estate up and gave the farmland to local tenants. Someone else got the house, the yard and a small bit of ground. The house then sat empty and fell into disrepair.

=== Restoration and commercial use ===
The house was bought in 2001 by George and Susie Gossip. Before that they had been based at Tullanisk House near Birr. Jeremy Williams, a conservation architect, oversaw a restoration of the building for the Gossips. It took about five years to finish. They re-did the roof, and window openings that had been blocked up were opened back out. Joinery and panelling from the period went back in. Some of the cost was covered by grants from the Heritage Council and from the Irish Georgian Society. The Gossips moved in during 2005 and ran the house as a guesthouse. The estate changed hands in 2024. It is still run as a guesthouse and let to groups.

Galway County Council has listed the house, under the Galway County Development Plan 2022-2028, as a protected structure.

== Architecture ==
The house is small. Two storeys sit over a basement and there is an attic under the roof. The roof itself is steep and gabled at each end. Two big chimneys go up at the gable ends. According to the building's National Inventory of Architectural Heritage (NIAH) entry, the walls are field stone, with a coat of rough lime render over the top. The roof is slated.

The front door has a pedimented limestone surround. Limestone jambs sit either side and a dropped keystone tops it off. Stone steps go up to the door. The house also has a courtyard. Two ranges of stone outbuildings close it in. One range is older than the other. They used to serve as stables and farm offices.

Inside, the house splits into three parts. A staircase hall runs down the middle. Reception rooms sit either side of it. The staircase is original to the building. Robert O'Byrne wrote in 2014 that the house has "solid rural grandeur in a miniature scale".

== See also ==
- List of country houses in Ireland
