= Gurteen, County Galway =

Gurteen Góirtín
- Village / Half-Parish
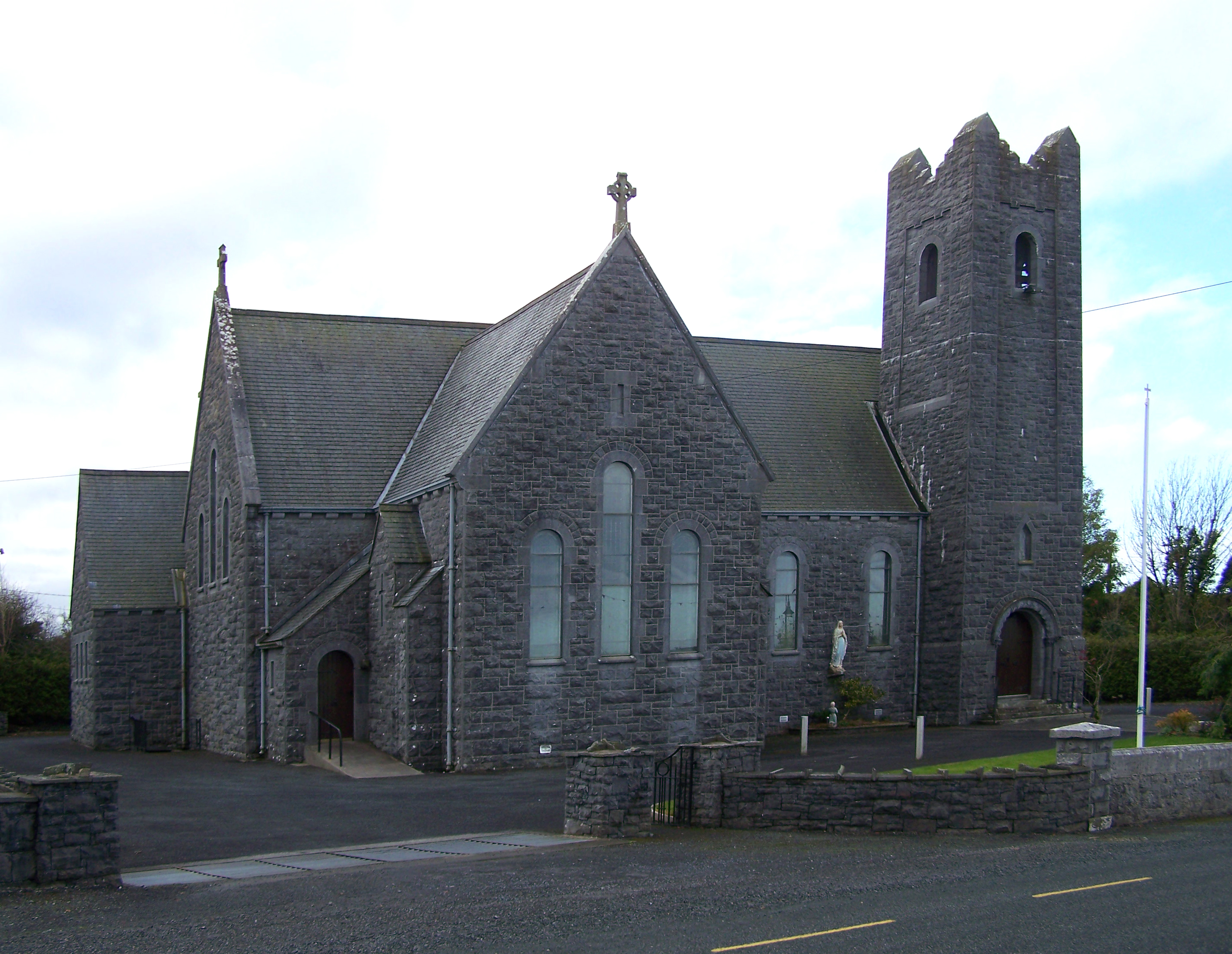
- Fr Griffin Memorial Church, Gurteen

- Location in Ireland
- Coordinates: 53°21′53″N 8°35′06″W
- Country: Ireland
- Province: Connacht
- County: County Galway
- Time zone: UTC+0 (WET)
  - Summer (DST): UTC-1 (IST (WEST))

Gurteen is a village in East County Galway, Ireland. The Irish translation of Gurteen (Irish: Góirtín) translates as "Little Ploughed Field". Gurteen is a half-parish of the Ballymacward-Gurteen parish. The nearest towns are Athenry and Mountbellew.

The patron saint of Gurteen is Saint Kerrill. Saint Kerrill's Well is located at the very southern tip of the parish in Gortnalone, near neighbouring Attymon. Saint Kerrill's Abbey is in Clonkeenkerrill with Clonkeenkerrill Graveyard. Saint Kerrill's feast day is held every year on 13 June.

The Roman Catholic church in Gurteen is named after a local priest, Father Michael Griffin, who was a native of the village. He was shot dead on the night of 14 November 1920, most likely by Auxiliaries. The Galway Minor 'A' Hurling Championship trophy is named in his honour. The trophy was won once (in 1977) by the local Gaelic Athletic Association Club Pádraig Pearses GAA. The Father Griffins GAA/Éire Óg Club based in Galway City is also named in honour of Father Griffin.

Located in East Galway, Gurteen is a rural area with a church (St Michael's) and a primary school. The school, Saint Kerrill's NS was opened in 1982, when 3 smaller national schools were merged: Clonkeenkerrill, Shanballard and Tample. The local GAA club is Pádraig Pearse's GAA. Founded in 1966 when the Gurteen and Ballymacward clubs amalgamated, it has playing pitches in Ballymacward and Gurteen. Colemanstown United FC is a soccer club located in the area. Founded in 1982, the club competes in the Galway District Soccer League.

== Notable people ==
- Father Griffin
- Noel Treacy RIP, TD & Galway GAA County Board Chairman
- Cyril Donnellan, Pádraig Pearse's GAA player and former Galway hurler
- Seán Mac Giollarnáth, Irish folklorist.

== See also ==
- List of towns and villages in Ireland
