= Ivor =

Ivor is an English masculine given name derived either directly from Norse Ívarr, or through Welsh (which spells it Ifor) or Irish and Scottish Gaelic (which spell it Íomhar), all of which likely derive it also from the original Norse form. The Norse name is derived from the Old Norse elements ýr (yew, bow) and herr (warrior, army): hence, 'archer, bow warrior'. It is possible the old Norse name Ívarr comes from the Celtic root and may be related to the Celtic root of -iv which is found in St. Ives for example, itself possibly referring to yew. This could indicate an earlier shared language origin; potentially through Indo-European, previous contact or another source.

Some of the earliest known bearers of the name are Ibar of Beggerin, an Irish saint who may have preceded or been contemporary with St. Patrick and probably died in the 500s; Ivar the Boneless, an 800s Viking who was possibly identical to the Ímair attested in Irish and Scottish annals; and Ifor Bach, a Welsh leader of the 1100s.

== People ==
=== Religious ===
- Íbar of Killibar Beg, an early Irish saint related to Ibar of Beggerin.

=== Academics ===
- Ivor Agyeman-Duah (born 1966), Ghanaian academic, economist and writer
- Ivor Grattan-Guinness, British historian of mathematics and logic
- Ivor van Heerden, South African-born American meteorologist
- Ivor Jennings (1903–1965), British lawyer and constitutional scholar
- Ivor G. Wilks (1928–2014), British Africanist and historian

=== Arts and entertainment ===
- Ivor Barnard (1887–1953), English actor
- Ivor Cutler (1923–2006), Scottish poet, songwriter and humorist
- Iva Davies, lead singer of Icehouse
- Ivor Davies (artist) (born 1935), Welsh painter
- Ivor Darreg (1917–1994), American composer
- Ivor Dean (1917–1974), British actor
- Ivor Dennis (1932–2018), Sri Lankan Sinhala playback vocalist
- Ivor Emmanuel (1927–2007), Welsh opera singer
- Ivor Francis (1918–1986), Canadian-born American actor
- Ivor Gurney (1890–1937), English composer and poet
- Ivor Hele (1912–1993), Australian painter
- Ivor James (1882–1963), British cellist
- Ivor Mairants (1908–1998), British-Polish guitarist
- Ivor Moreton (1908–1984), British singer and pianist
- Ivor Novello (1893–1951), Welsh entertainer
- Ivor Roberts (actor) (1925–1999), British actor and television presenter
- Ivor Wood (1932–2004), British stop-motion animator
- Ivor Biggun, stage name of British musician Doc Cox

=== Nobility ===
- Lord Ivor Spencer-Churchill (1898–1956), British art collector

=== Politicians and diplomats ===
- Ivor Callely (born 1958), Irish politician
- Ivor Caplin (born 1958), British politician
- Ivor Cummings (1913 – 1992), British civil servant and colonial administrator
- Ivor Guest, 1st Viscount Wimborne (1873–1939), British politician
- Ivor Guest, 1st Baron Wimborne (1835–1914), Welsh industrialist, father of the above
- Ivor Richard, Baron Richard (1932–2018), British politician
- Ivor Roberts (diplomat) (born 1946), British diplomat

=== Sportsmen ===
- Ivor Allchurch (1929–1997), Wales international footballer
- Ivan Ivor Broadis (1922–2019), England international footballer
- Ivor Bueb (1923–1959), British Formula One driver
- Ivor Jones (1901–1982), Welsh rugby union player
- Ivor McIvor (1917–1997), Australian rules footballer and captain-coach
- Ivor Wynne (1918–1970), Welsh-Canadian educator and university administrator

== Fictional characters ==
- the title character of Ivor the Engine, an animated British TV series
- one of the characters in the Who song "A Quick One, While He's Away"
- one of the title characters of Ivor Lott and Tony Broke, a British comic strip
- a promotion match opponent in the video game Pokémon Legends: Z-A
- a main character in the video game Minecraft Story Mode
- a character in the comedy duo act Damo and Ivor
- a character in the video game Dragon Quest IX
