= Laisrén =

Laisrén may refer to:

- Saint Laisrén mac Nad Froích (died 564), patron saint of Devenish Island
- Saint Lasrén mac Feradaig (died 605), third abbot of Iona
- Saint Molaise of Leighlin (died 639), abbot of Leighlin and hermit of Holy Isle
- Saint Laisrén mac Decláin (fl. 6th century), patron saint of Inishmurray
- Saint Laisren of Cloonkerrill (fl. 5/6th century), saint in County Galway
