= Íomar of the Sogain =

Irish saint

Íomar of the Sogain is an obscure fifth- or sixth-century saint associated with Killimorsogan (Cill Íomar Soghain, or the church of Íomar of the Sogain), now the townlands of Killaghaun and Lisheen, north-east of Killamude, County Galway. It was known by this name up to the eighteenth century.

There are two other similarly named churches in the diocese of Clonfert, their relationship to this Íomar uncertain. The first is Cill Íomar (now Killimordaly), which was also known as Cill Íomar Mhaonmhaige (the church of Íomar of Maenmagh) Maenmagh was later known as Trícha Máenmaige.

The second is Cill Íomar Bolg (the church of Íomar of the Fir Bolg), now Killimorbolg, five miles northwest of Portumna.

It is uncertain if these churches were founded by the one person, or if there were three people of the name, distinguished by three different descriptions.

== See also ==
- Íomar Fir Bolg
