= Maol Chosna =

Maol Chosna (fl. early 6th century) was an Irish missionary and founder of the church of Cill Maol Chosna ("the church of Maol Chosna"), which gave its name to the vicarage of the east half of Ballymacward, County Galway. The site is located at Kilmelcosing cemetery, Ballymacward.

A note added to the Félire Óengusso identifies him as "Máel-coisne of Cell Máel-coisne i Huí Maini in Connaught on the same feast as Mary the Mother of Jesus". He would appear to have been one of the second generation of missionaries among the Soghain after Kerrill, who was ordained by Saint Patrick; thus he would have been active sometime in the early decades of the 6th century.

A holy well in Kinreask townland may commemorate him. Well into the 20th century it was visited on 29 June, and its waters said to cure eye ailments.

Nothing else appears to be known of Maol Chosna. His feast day was 16 August.
