= Thomas Donahue =

Thomas or Tom Donahue may refer to:

- Thomas J. Donohue (1938–2024), American business executive
- Thomas R. Donahue (1928–2023), American trade union leader
- Thomas Michael Donahue (1921–2004), American physicist, astronomer, and space and planetary scientist
- Tom Donahue (DJ) (1928–1975), pioneering American rock and roll radio disc jockey
- Tom Donahue (filmmaker) (born 1968), American film director and producer
- Tom Donahue (runner), winner of the 1970 distance medley relay at the NCAA Division I Indoor Track and Field Championships

== See also ==
- Tom Donahoe (fl. 1990s–2010s), American football executive
- Tom Donohue (born 1952), American professional baseball player
- Tom Donoghue (born 1951), Irish hurler
