= Patrick Darcy =

Patrick D'Arcy may refer to:

- Patrick D'Arcy (1598–1668), Irish nationalist
- Patrick d'Arcy (1725–1779), Irish mathematician and soldier

== See also ==
- Pat Darcy (born 1950), American baseball player
