= Aedanus Burke =

American soldier, judge, and politician (1743–1802)

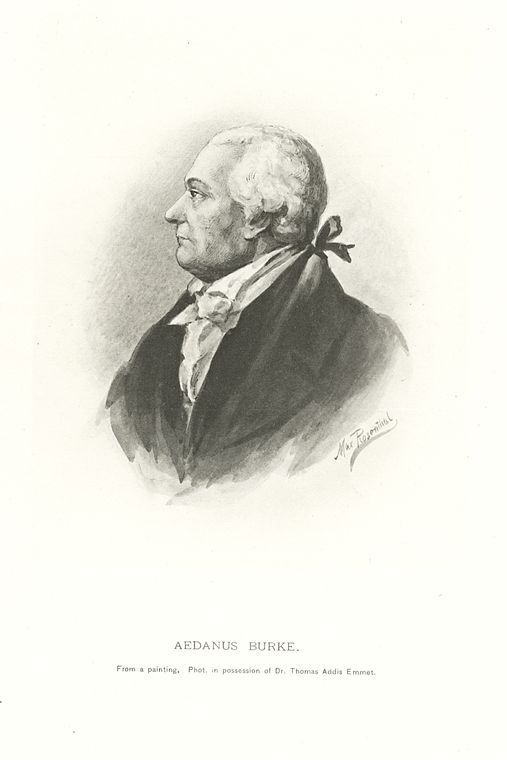

Chief Justice of the Supreme Court of South Carolina
- In office 1796–1799

Member of the U.S. House of Representatives from South Carolina's 2nd district
- In office March 4, 1789 – March 3, 1791
- Preceded by: Constituency created
- Succeeded by: Robert Barnwell

Member of the South Carolina House of Representatives from St. Philip's and St. Michael's Parish
- In office August 31, 1779 – November 4, 1788

Personal details
- Born: June 16, 1743 Tiaquin, County Galway, Kingdom of Ireland
- Died: March 30, 1802 (aged 58) Charleston, South Carolina, U.S.
- Party: Anti-Administration
- Profession: Judge

Military service
- Allegiance: United States of America
- Branch/service: Continental Army; South Carolina Militia
- Years of service: 1778; 1780–1782
- Battles/wars: American Revolutionary War

Aedanus Burke (June 16, 1743 – March 30, 1802) was a soldier, slaveholder, judge, and United States representative from South Carolina.

== Life ==
Born in Tiaquin, County Galway in the Kingdom of Ireland, Burke attended the theological College of Saint Omer, visited New Orleans, visited the West Indies, and moved back to the American Colonies, settling in Charles Town, South Carolina (now Charleston). Burke served in the militia forces of South Carolina during the American Revolutionary War and was appointed a judge of the state circuit court in 1778, serving until the enemy overran the state. Burke was a member of the South Carolina House of Representatives from 1778 to 1779 and again served in the Revolutionary Army from 1780 to 1782.

In 1783, Burke published two pamphlets, An Address to the Freemen of South Carolina (January 1783) and Considerations on the Society or Order of Cincinnati (October 1783), under the pseudonym Cassius where he criticized the nascent Society of the Cincinnati for being an attempt at reestablishing a hereditary nobility in the new republic.

When the courts were reestablished, Burke resumed his seat on the bench and, in 1785, was appointed one of three commissioners to prepare a digest of the State laws. Burke was a member of the convention in 1788 called to consider ratification of the Constitution of the United States, which he opposed. Burke was elected as an Anti-Administration candidate to the First United States Congress (March 4, 1789 – March 3, 1791). Burke attracted national attention for his March 1790 speech deriding Alexander Hamilton on the floor of the House of Representatives. Burke seized on a comment that Hamilton made during his eulogy to Nathanael Greene the previous year, where Hamilton had labeled some state militias during the American Revolution the "mimicry of soldiership," to attack the Treasury Secretary's personal honor. Hamilton claimed the comment had been taken out of context. Burke later retracted his statement.

Burke declined to be a candidate for reelection in 1790 to the Second Congress, the legislature having passed a law prohibiting a state judge from leaving the state; Burke was elected a chancellor of the courts of equity in 1799 and served until he died in Charleston in 1802. As the senior member of the South Carolina appellate courts from 1796 to 1799, Burke was the Chief Justice of South Carolina. Interment was in the Chapel of Ease of St. Bartholomew's Parish's cemetery near Jacksonboro, South Carolina.

U.S. House of Representatives
| Preceded by Constituency established | Member of the U.S. House of Representatives from South Carolina's 2nd congressional district 1789-1791 | Succeeded by Robert Barnwell |
