= Felig =

5th-6th-century Irish missionary

Felig was a 5th-6th-century Irish missionary.

== Biography ==
Felig is the name of a person believed to be the founder of Cill Fheilige ('the church of Felig'), which according to local tradition was the first church founded among the Soghain people of Menlough, County Galway. This would make Felig among the first Christian missionaries in Connacht, perhaps only a generation removed from the mission of Saint Patrick and Kerrill.

Within Kilfelligy townland there is a burial vault among the grown-over foundations of a later church, which probably was constructed on the site of the original fifth- or sixth-century church. There seems to be no other surviving traditions or documentation concerning Felig.
