= Piscina =

Shallow basin in a church used for washing the communion vessels

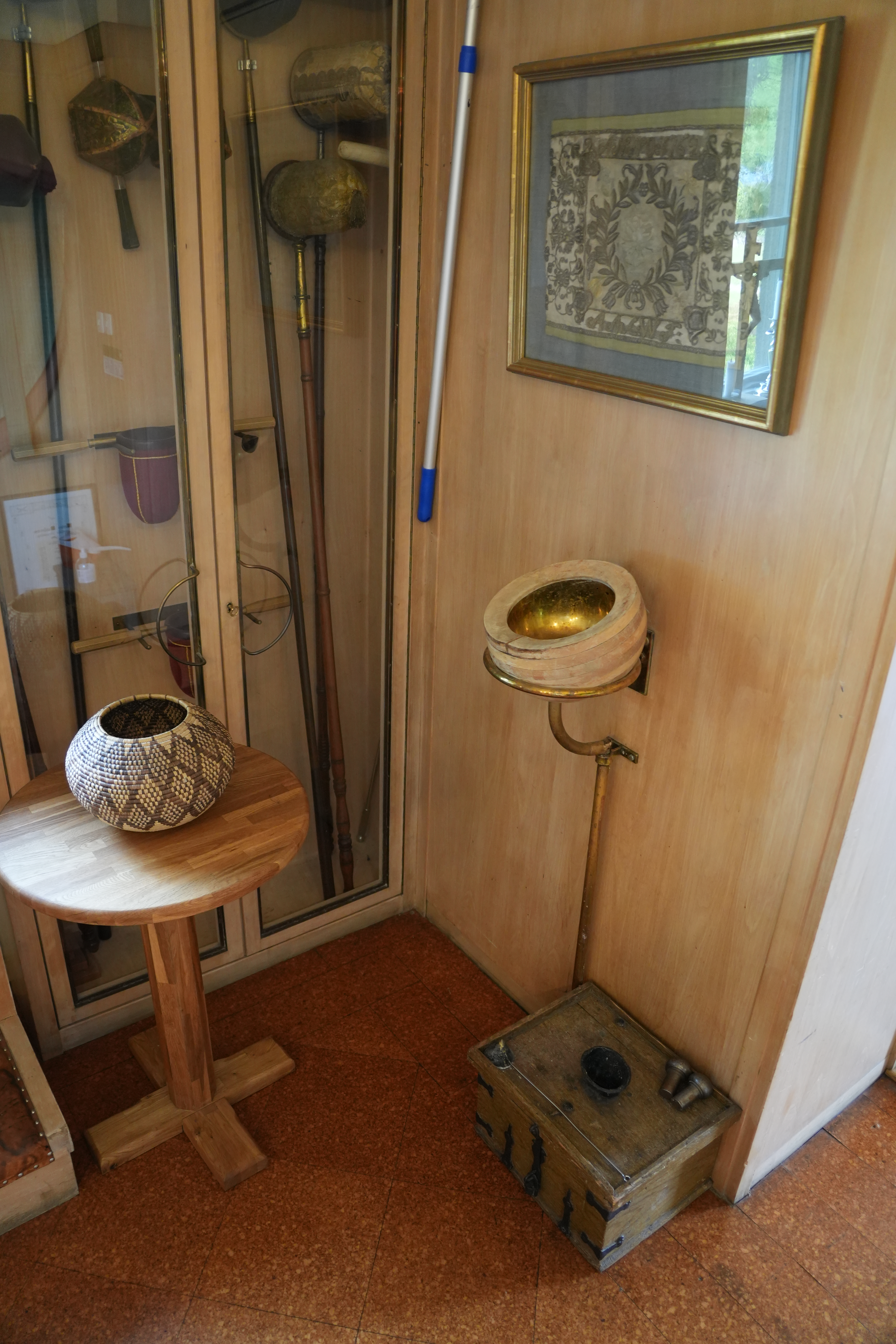
Located in the sacristry is the piscina of Norrtälje Church (Evangelical-Lutheran), part of the Archdiocese of Uppsala of the Church of Sweden.

A piscina is a shallow basin placed near the altar of a Christian church, or else in the vestry or sacristy, used for washing the communion vessels. The sacrarium is the drain itself. Lutherans and Anglicans usually refer to the basin, calling it a piscina. For Catholics and Lutherans, a sacrarium is a "special sink used for the reverent disposal of sacred substances. This sink has a cover, a basin, and a special pipe and drain that empty directly into the earth, rather than into the sewer system" (USCCB, Built of Living Stones, 236). Precious or sacred items are disposed of, when possible, by returning them to the ground. They are in some cases used to dispose of materials used in the sacraments and water from liturgical ablutions. They are found in Catholic, Evangelical-Lutheran, and Anglican churches, and a similar vessel is used in Eastern Orthodox churches.

== History ==
The Latin word piscina originally referred to a fish pond. Its meaning later expanded to include bathing pools, water tanks, and reservoir. In ecclesiastical usage it was applied to the basin used for ablutions and sometimes other sacraments. They were originally named for the baptismal font. Piscinae seem at first to have been mere cups or small basins, supported on perforated stems, placed close to the wall, and afterwards to have been recessed therein and covered with niche heads, which often contained shelves to serve as ambries. They were rare in England until the 13th century, after which there is scarcely an altar without one. They frequently take the form of a double niche, with a shaft between the arched heads, which are often filled with elaborate tracery. If there is no drain, a niche for washing is a lavabo, though the usage of the two terms is confusing.

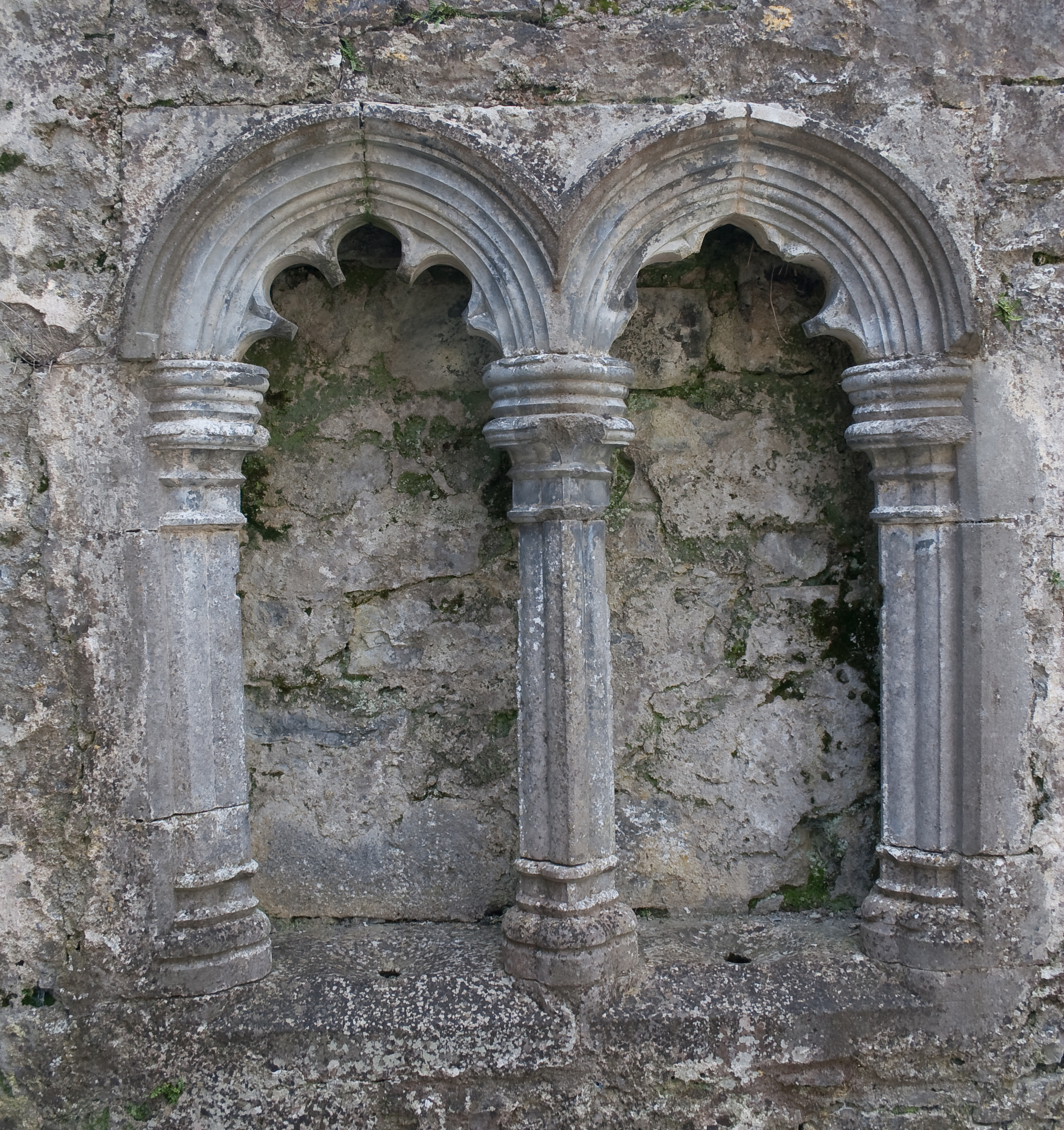
16th-century double piscina at the Franciscan friary in Kilconnell, Ireland

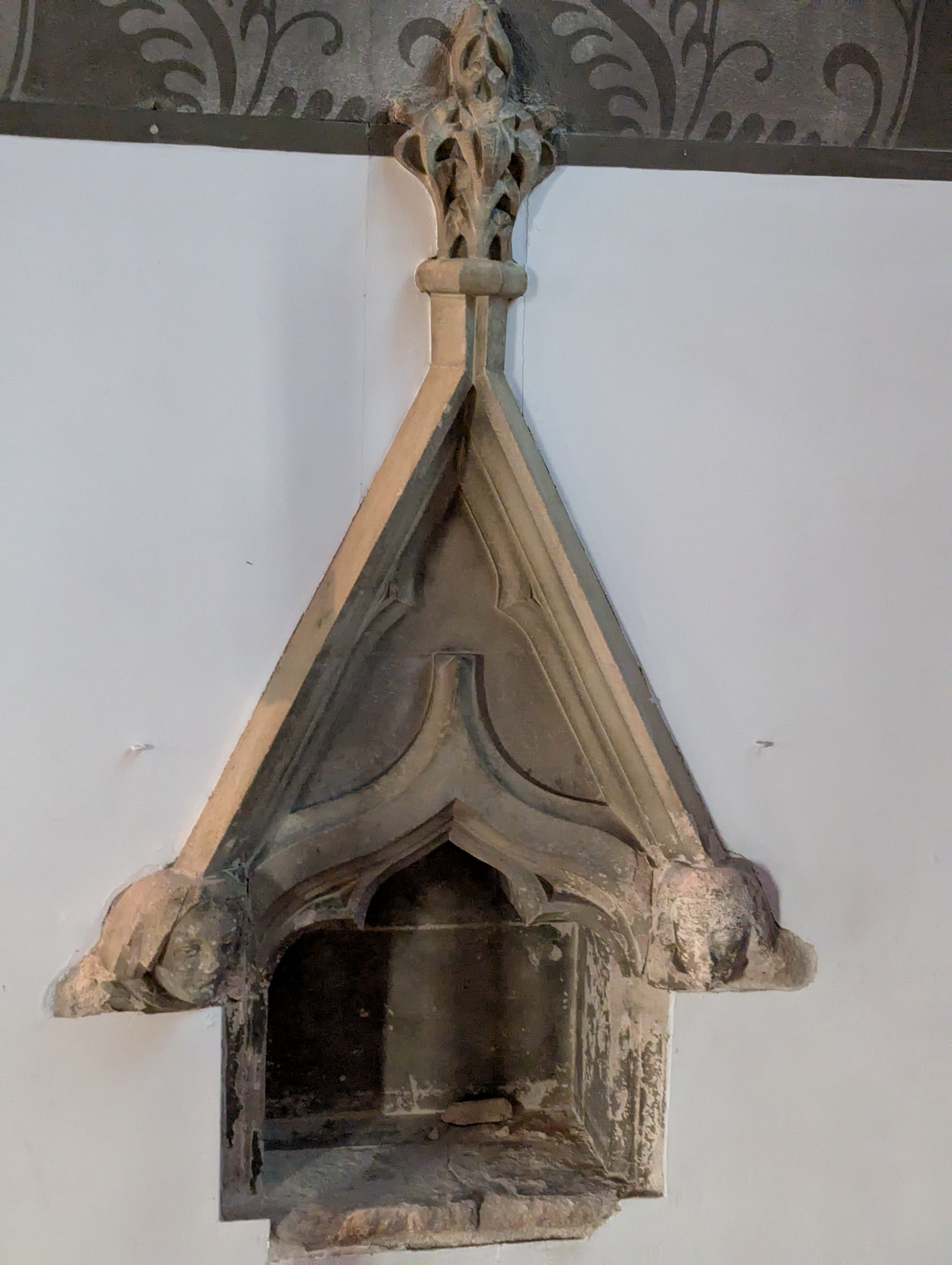
The piscina in the north wall of the chancel at St. Mary the Virgin church at Henley-on-Thames, Oxfordshire

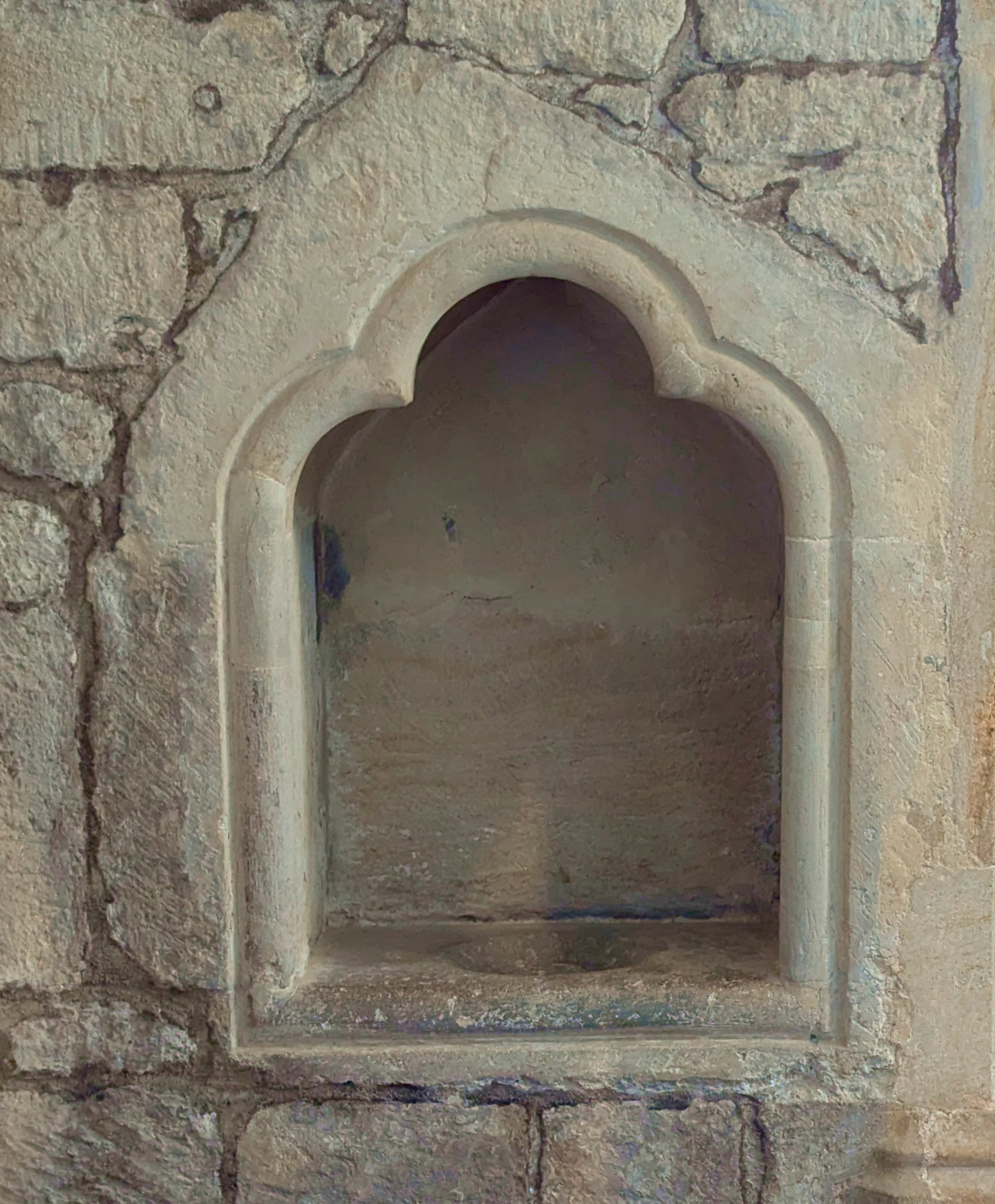
C15 piscina in St. Katherine's chapel inside Sherborne Abbey, Dorset, England (May 2025)

== Usage ==
The purpose of the piscina or sacrarium is to dispose of water used sacramentally, by returning these particles directly to the earth. For this reason, it is connected by a pipe directly to the ground; otherwise presumably, a basin was used. At times the piscina has been used for disposal of other items, such as old baptismal water, holy oils, and leftover ashes from Ash Wednesday.

In the Catholic Church, pouring the consecrated wine, the Blood of Christ, or the Host down a sacrarium is forbidden. Extremely rarely, the Eucharistic species spoils or becomes contaminated such that it cannot be consumed. The host is then dissolved in water until it disappears, and then the water is poured down into the sacrarium. In accordance with what is laid down by the canons, "one who throws away the consecrated species or takes them away or keeps them for a sacrilegious purpose, incurs a latae sententiae excommunication reserved to the Apostolic See; a cleric, moreover, may be punished by another penalty, not excluding dismissal from the clerical state." This applies to any action that is knowingly, voluntarily, and gravely disrespectful of the sacred species. Anyone, therefore, who acts contrary to these norms, for example casting the sacred species into the sacrarium or in an unworthy place or on the ground, incurs the penalties laid down. Certain conditions, laid out in the current Code for Canon Law, must be met in order for the penalties to apply.

== Eastern Christianity ==
In the Eastern Orthodox, Eastern Lutheran and Eastern Catholic Churches the piscina is called a thalassidion, and is located in the diaconicon (sacristy). The thalassidion is a sink that drains into an honourable place in the ground where liquids such as the water used to wash holy things may be poured, and where the clergy may wash their hands before serving the Divine Liturgy. In Orthodoxy the Sacred Mysteries (consecrated elements) are never poured into the thalassidion, but must always be consumed by a deacon or priest.

In some ancient churches, the thalassidion was placed under the Holy Table (altar), though now it is almost always located in the diaconicon. At one time, before a monk or nun was tonsured, their religious habit would be placed on the thalassidion; now, since the separation of the thalassidion from the Holy Table, the habit is placed on the Holy Table. When a monk or nun is tonsured, if the hair must be disposed of, it is thrown into the thalassidion.
