= John Ryan (Galway hurler) =

Irish hurler

Personal information
- Native name: Seán Ó Riain (Irish)
- Born: April 1958 Killimordaly, County Galway, Ireland
- Died: 7 October 2003 (aged 45) Killimordaly, County Galway, Ireland

Sport
- Sport: Hurling
- Position: Centre-forward
Club
- Years: Club
- Killimordaly
Club titles
- Galway titles: 1
- Connacht titles: 1
Inter-county*
Years	County	Apps (scores)
1980-1984	Galway	4 (1-2)
Inter-county titles
- All-Irelands: 1
- NHL: 0
- All Stars: 0
- *Inter County team apps and scores correct as of 23:05, 4 February 2014.

John Ryan (April 1958 - 7 October 2003) was an Irish hurler who played as a centre-forward for the Galway senior team.

Born in Killimordaly, County Galway, Ryan first played competitive hurling whilst at Presentation College, Athenry. He made his first impression on the inter-county scene when he joined the Galway under-21 team. He made his senior debut during the 1980 championship. Ryan went on to play a key role for Galway for a short period, and won one All-Ireland medal and one National Hurling League medal.

At club level Ryan was a one-time Connacht medallist with Killimordaly. He also won one championship medal with the club.

Throughout his career Ryan made just four championship appearances for Galway. His retirement came following the conclusion of the 1984 championship.

His brother, Éanna, also played with Galway and was a two-time All-Ireland medallist.

== Honours ==
=== Player ===
Killimordaly

- Connacht Senior Club Hurling Championship (1): 1986
- Galway Senior Club Hurling Championship (1): 1986

Galway

- All-Ireland Senior Hurling Championship (1): 1980
- All-Ireland Under-21 Hurling Championship (1): 1978
