= Naomhéid =

Irish saint

Naomhéid is the name given to the founder of the church of Killascobe, County Galway, Ireland. In the 19th century there was a dried-up holy well thirty metres from the church and graveyard in the townland of Corgerry Oughter. It was called Tobar Naomhéid, possibly a corruption of Tobar Naomh Áed ('the well of Saint Áed').

Naomhéid may be the Easpag (bishop) Aed mention in a list of early Irish bishops. If so, his diocese would have been the kingdom of Soghain.
