= Teach (Irish term) =

Irish language term referring to a home, previously also to a church

Teach is an Irish language term.

The following definition of the term has been given by Dónall Mac Giolla Easpaig

The word teach, 'a house', is the only widely attested native Irish element to designate a church of monastic site in early placenames. the term is found in placenames of all periods but, generally speaking, the meaning '(monastic) church'. The late Deirdre Flanagan has suggested that the deployment of teach as an ecclesiastical placename element is a continuation of the pagan use of the term to denote sacred or mythological sites. There is sufficient evidence available to show that [some] of the eccleiastical sitename [of Ireland] containing the element teach is of pre-Christian origin.

He further notes that along with the words Cíll and Díseart it can be loosely translated as church. Teach is purely Gaelic, while the other two are derived from Latin.

It is now used in Ireland to denote a secular dwelling, often a family house. An alternative form is tígh.

== See also ==
- Tígh
- Tynagh
- Conainne
