= Cuana of Kilcoonagh =

Cuana of Kilcoonagh was an early Christian missionary active in the northeast of the parish of Ballymacward, County Galway, sometime around or after 500. He was the founder of the church at Kilcoonagh, (now the townland of Garrafine), of which a children's burial ground, called Shanclogh, appears to be the only extant remains.

Cuana evangelised among the Soghain people, and appears to have been a member of this people himself. A saint of his name is listed as follows: "Cuana mac Tálain mac Dubhtaigh mac Rosa mac Finnchadha mac Fedhlimidh mac Sodhan Salbhuidhe. This pedigree would make him a kinsman of both Kerrill and Molua of Kilmoluagh.

== Sources ==
- The Life, Legends and Legacy of Saint Kerrill: A Fifth-Century East Galway Evangelist, Joseph Mannion, 2004. 0 954798 1 3
