= Aughrim Ringforts =

- Ráthanna Eachroma (Irish)
- Location within Ireland
- 53.293653°N 8.314536°W
- Type: ringfort
- Location: Attidermot, Aughrim, County Galway, Ireland

Site notes
- Elevation: Aughrim Fort: 103 m (338 ft); Lisbeg: 82 m (269 ft)
- Owner: State

National monument of Ireland
- Official name: Aughrim
- Reference no.: 371

Aughrim Ringforts are a pair of ringforts forming a National Monument located in County Galway, Ireland.

== Location ==
Aughrim Ringforts are located on farmland 900 m (½ mile) south of Aughrim, County Galway, on Aughrim Hill. They are 335 m apart.

== History ==
Ringforts were built in Ireland in the 6th–12th century as protected farmsteads. The Aughrim forts provide commanding views over the surrounding countryside and overlooking the Melehan River, a tributary of the Suck.

== Description ==
=== Aughrim Fort ===
A univallate ringfort, about 40 m (130 ft) in diameter.

It is also known as General St. Ruth's Fort, after the Marquis de St Ruth; it was here that the Irish Jacobites placed their cannon at the 1691 Battle of Aughrim, and St Ruth was fatally shot in the field 250 m (270 yd) to the northeast.

=== Lisbeg ===
A univallate ringfort, about 40 m (130 ft) in diameter.
