= Maelimarchair =

Maelimarchair (died 746) was Bishop of Aughrim, County Galway.

Maelimarchair is one of the few recorded Bishops of Aughrim, which was situated in western Uí Maine. Nothing appears to be known of his origins or life. His term seems to have coincided with that of king Cathal Maenmaighe, who died in 745.

Preceded by Flann Aighle	Bishop or Abbot of Aughrim; 736?–746	Succeeded by Rechtabhra mac Dubbchomar?
