= Kiltullagh =

Civil parish in County Galway, Ireland

Coordinates: 53.2751°N 8.6371°W

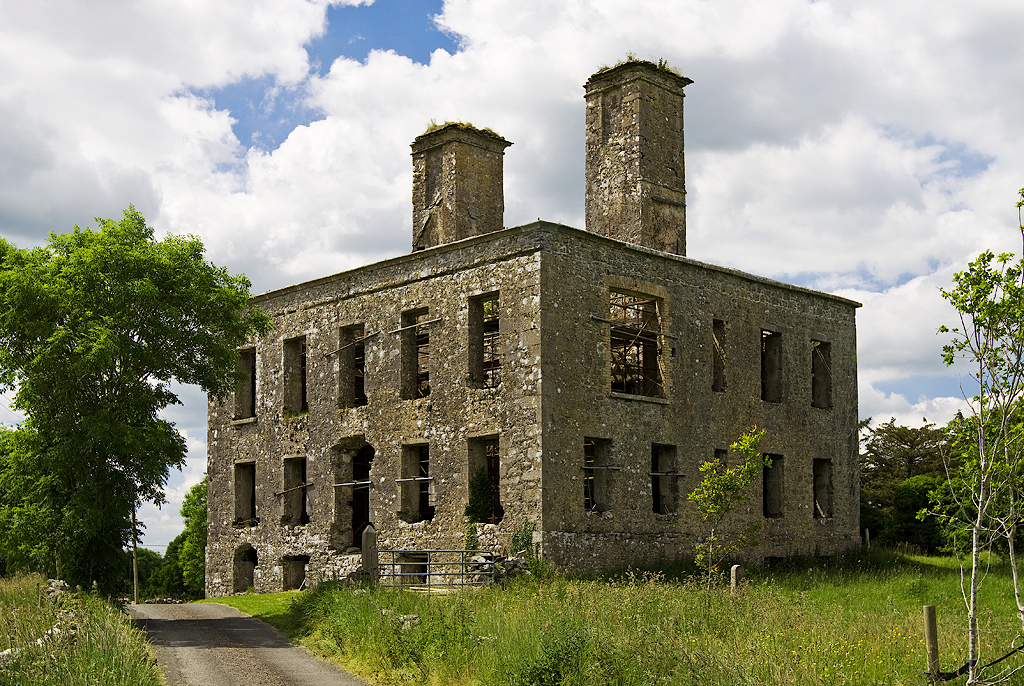
Kiltullagh House, built c. 1725, is the birthplace of mathematician Patrick d'Arcy (1725–1779)

Kiltullagh (Irish: Cill Tulach, meaning 'church of the hillock') is a village and civil parish in County Galway, Ireland. Located on the R348 regional road, the M6 motorway passes nearby. As of 2011, the townlands of Kiltullagh South and Kiltullagh North, in Kiltullagh civil parish, had a combined population of 93 people.

Evidence of ancient settlement in the area includes a number of ring fort, holy well, fulacht fiadh and ecclesiastical enclosure sites in the townlands of Kiltullagh North, Kiltullagh South and Clogharevaun. Kiltullagh House, a mid-18th century country house in Kiltullagh North, was the birthplace of the mathematician Patrick d'Arcy (1725–1779). The local Catholic church, Saint Peter and Paul's Church, was built c. 1840. The church contains a number of works by Evie Hone. The nearby national (primary) school, first established in 1856, now occupies a building built in the mid-20th century. Kiltullagh Pioneers AFC, a local association football (soccer) club, has a facility nearby.

== See also ==
- Killimordaly
