= Flann Aighle =

Flann Aighle (died 736) was Bishop of Aughrim, County Galway.

Flann is the first known bishop of Aughrim since its founder, Connell of Aughrim, who lived c.500.

Aughrim was situated in western Uí Maine, though it is not known what blood relationship, if any, Flann had with its ruling dynasty. During this era Uí Maine was ruled by King Dluthach mac Fithcheallach, who reigned from 711 to 738.

Preceded by Connell of Aughrim	Bishop or Abbot of Aughrim ?–736	Succeeded by Maelimarchair
