= Maolán =

Saint Maolan (or Maelan)
- Born: unknown
- Died: ?
- Venerated in: Catholic Church, Eastern Orthodox Church
- Feast: 25 December
- Patronage: Tullaghmelan, County Tipperary

Maolán was an early Christian bishop in Connacht, whose feast day is given as 25 December. He is the reputed founder of a church at Tullaghmelan in County Tipperary.

His name is listed in the Martyrology of O'Gorman under 25 December and he is described as 'Great Maelan, void of weakness.' An ancient stone carving of a bishop's head at Tullaghmelan is believed to be St. Maolan.

He is commemorated in the placnames Cill Easpaig Mhaoláin (the church of Bishop Maolán) or Killaspugmoylan, parish of Kilconickny, Loughrea) and Cill Mhaoláin (the church of Maolán) or Kilmoylan, a parish four miles south of Tuam. It is likely that one or more saints with this name have become conflated as there were at least 6 saints commemorated in medieval Ireland named Maolan/Maelan.

== See also ==
- Conainne
- Ciarán of Clonmacnoise
- Brendan
- Kerrill
- Soghain
