= Íomar Fir Bolg =

Irish saint

Íomar Fir Bolg (fl. 5th/6th century AD) was an early Irish Saint.

Writing on 5 November 1838, John O'Donovan reported that his field work for the Ordnance Survey had brought him to the parish of Killimer-Bologue, which was "according to tradition ... the principal establishment and the birth-place of St. Imor, whose life was preserved in the Country in Irish metre to a late period." O'Donovon, who appears to have been informed by a Mr. McEgan "who lives near the old church" included the following account of Íomar in his letter:

Imor was a very respectable man living in Sil-Anmhcadha a long time ago [tradition never remembers dates] and had no idea originally of becoming a saint, but had intended to apply himself to increasing the number of the human family in a lawful manner [liberis procreandis operam dare sibi proposuit] and for this purpose he married a very beautiful girl, a native of Ely O'Carroll on the other side of the Shannon. But before he had seen her she had been wooed by another who was driven to desperation on hearing of her marriage with Imor, and he swore that he would never suffer her to be brought to Connacht. Accordingly on the day that Imor went with a party of his friends to take her home, he [his Munster rival], having collected a body of the men of Slieve Bloom, attacked him on the way after he had cross (the Shannon), and made a desperate effort to carry off the bride. But the Connaught (party) were equally vigorous in resisting, and the poor girl was killed in the struggle between them! After this Imor became a melancholy recluse and swore to (he would) dedicate his virginity to God. He never took holy orders, but still was always esteemed as an Irish saint.

At the time of O'Donovan's visit, it measured 75 feet long and 18 broad, "It is the largest parish church of the period to which it must be referred, that I have yet seen in Ireland ... The greater part of the two side walls is destroyed, but the two gables, which are 75 feet asunder are in good preservation. The oldest tombstone in this church is a monument to William O'Tressy, who died in the year 16-4."

St. Imor's well was situated at the side of the road immediately beside the church.

== See also ==
- Íomar of the Sogain
