= Michael Griffin (Irish priest) =

Irish Roman Catholic priest (1892–1920)

The Reverend Michael Griffin
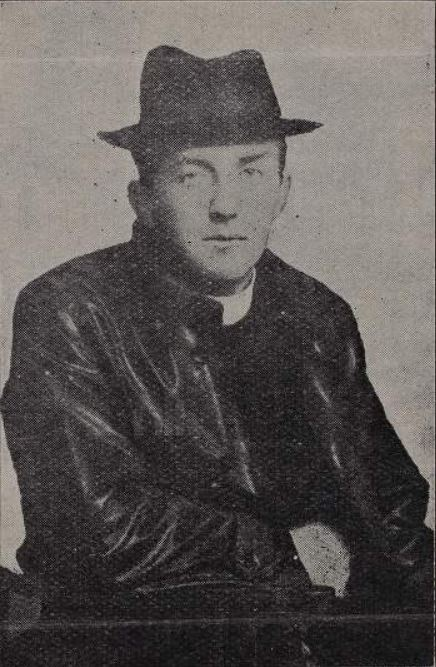
- Born: Michael Griffin; 18 September 1892; Gurteen, County Galway, Ireland
- Died: 14 November 1920 (aged 28); Barna, County Galway, Ireland
- Occupation: Priest
- Known for: Being murdered during the Irish War of Independence

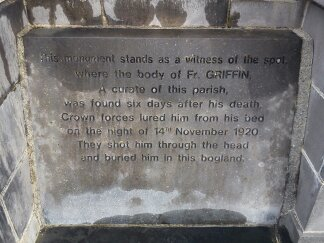
Father Griffin Memorial, Barna

Michael Griffin (18 September 1892 – 14 November 1920) was an Irish Catholic priest who was murdered during the Irish War of Independence.

== Life ==
Griffin was born in the townland of Gurteen, County Galway, to Thomas George Griffin, a farmer, and Mary Coyne (also Kyne). In the 1901 and 1911 censuses, the family was recorded as living in the neighbouring townland of Gortnacross. Griffin's father had been serving as the chairman of Galway County Council when he died in 1914; he had also been associated with the Irish National Land League, along with the political movement of its founder, Charles Stewart Parnell, and was imprisoned for his activities in the 1880s.

Griffin was ordained at St Patrick's College, Maynooth in 1917. A priest of the Diocese of Clonfert, he served in the Diocese of Galway, Kilmacduagh and Kilfenora. In June 1918, the curate was transferred from the parish of Ennistymon, County Clare, to Rahoon, Galway City.

On the night of 14 November 1920, during the Irish War for Independence, Griffin, a known Irish republican sympathiser, left his home at 2 Montpellier Terrace but never returned. "After being lured by British forces to leave the house, it’s thought he was taken to Lenaboy Castle, on Taylor’s Hill, where Auxiliary forces were stationed. There, he was questioned and ultimately killed." On 20 November, his body was found in an unmarked grave in a bog at Cloghscoltia near Barna; he had been shot through the head.

The day after Griffin's body was discovered, the Bloody Sunday massacre occurred in Dublin. On 23 November, after Griffin's funeral Mass at St Joseph's Church, the funeral cortege processed through the streets of Galway. Three bishops, 150 priests and in excess of 12,000 mourners participated. The priest was buried in the grounds of Loughrea Cathedral.

== Legacy ==
Griffin was most likely killed by the Auxiliary Division of the Royal Irish Constabulary (RIC). Due to his known Irish republican sympathies, he would have been a target for reprisal killing by Crown forces, who had already committed several such killings in Galway in the preceding months. He had given the last rites to IRA volunteer Seamus Quirke, who was shot and killed by the RIC on 9 September 1920, and took part in the funeral Mass for Sinn Féin councillor and local businessman Michael Walsh, who was killed by a group of armed men "with English accents" who claimed to be "English secret service men" on 19 October 1920, just weeks before Griffin was murdered.

According to IRA veteran Jack Feehan, Barna schoolmaster and police informant Patrick Joyce was widely believed to have given up Father Griffin's name to British security forces. For being a British spy, according to Feehan, Joyce has been abducted and shot by the IRA on 15 October 1920 and buried secretly. Patrick Joyce's body was only located in Furbo, near Barna, in July 1998.

The leader of the Irish Parliamentary Party, Joseph Devlin, raised the issue of Griffin's disappearance in the British House of Commons, claiming "it is clear that it was the officers of the Crown who have kidnapped this clergyman." In response, the Chief Secretary for Ireland Sir Hamar Greenwood described Griffin to the House of Commons as "an extreme Sinn Feiner" who allegedly "told his congregation that some among them were as bad as the "Black and Tans." However, Greenwood professed ignorance as to the involvement of the Auxiliary Division in Griffin's disappearance, stating, "I do not believe for a moment that this priest has been kidnapped by any of the forces of the Crown. It is obviously a stupid thing that no forces of the Crown would do." Devlin quickly retorted "[t]hat is just what they would do." Another Irish Member of Parliament, Jeremiah McVeagh, openly accused Greenwood of complicity, claiming "[i]t was your own men, your minions, who committed the murder. You know it." After resigning in protest over political interference in his efforts to Court martial his subordinates who violated the laws and customs of war, the former commander of the Auxiliary Division, Frank Percy Crozier, told the press "that Auxiliaries had murdered Father Griffin".

Another alleged participant was William Joyce, who later became known as "Lord Haw-Haw" for collaborating with Nazi Germany during World War II. Joyce's role was to act as a lure, asking Griffin to make a sick call and leave his home.

A group of enthusiasts gathered together in Galway in the spring of 1948 to form a Gaelic football club and they decided unanimously to name the club "Father Griffins". There is also a road in Galway City called "Father Griffin Road".

== See also ==
- Frank Shawe-Taylor
