= Maelduin of Aughrim =

Bishop and Erenagh of Aughrim

Maelduin of Aughrim, Bishop and Erenagh of Aughrim, County Galway, died 809.

Maelduin is the last recorded bishop of Aughrim in the Irish annals. He is also noted as its Erenagh in his obituary. Events which occurred during his lifetime included:

- 783 - The law of Ciaran was promulgated among the Connaughtmen.
- 785 - Council of Paderborn; battles of Ath Rois and Cluain Milain
- 791 - Death of Duineachaidh ua Daire, King of Ciarraighe Magh Ai
- 793 - Lindisfarne, and Inis Padraig, attacked by Vikings, and they bore away the shrine of Dochonna.
- 797 - Aedh Oirdnidhe divides Mide between Conchubhar and Ailill mac Donnchadha
- 805 - Muirgius mac Tommaltaig destroys Luighne in revenge for the murder of two of his sons

Preceded by Rechtabhra mac Dubbchomar	Bishop or Abbot of Aughrim; 782?–809	Succeeded by ?
