= Rechtabhra mac Dubbchomar =

Irish abbot

Rechtabhra mac Dubbchomar (died 782) was Abbot of Aughrim in Ireland.

Rechtabhra mac Dubbchomar is one of only five known bishops, abbots or Erenaghs of Aughrim. He is the first to be explicitly noted as an abbot, while the previous three were stated as being bishops.

Events during his lifetime included:

- 746 - Death of Coman, founder of Roscommon; the Blood court at Cannstatt
- 755 - Offa deposes Bernred of Mercia; death of Gaimdibhla of Aran.
- 769 - Death of Tomaltach mac Murghal, King of Mag Ai.
- 781 - Battle of Ath Liacc Finn; Tallaght Monastery founded by Máel Ruain

| Preceded by Maelimarchair | Bishop or Abbot of Aughrim; 746?–782 | Succeeded by Maelduin of Aughrim? |
