= Aodh mac Aidmhire =

Aodh mac Aidmhire, Irish dynast, fl. c. 600.

Aodh was the father of seven notable saints: Bairrfhionn; Fionnbharr; Maoldubh; Crónán; Gar Bhán; Sabh; Aille. Aodh was from Aughrim, County Galway, and is given as a descendant of Brión mac Echach Muigmedóin. In the genealogies he is given as Aodh, from Eachdhruim mac nAodha.
