= Cille Choirill =

Catholic Church in Lochaber, Scotland

Coordinates: 56.891°N 4.781°W

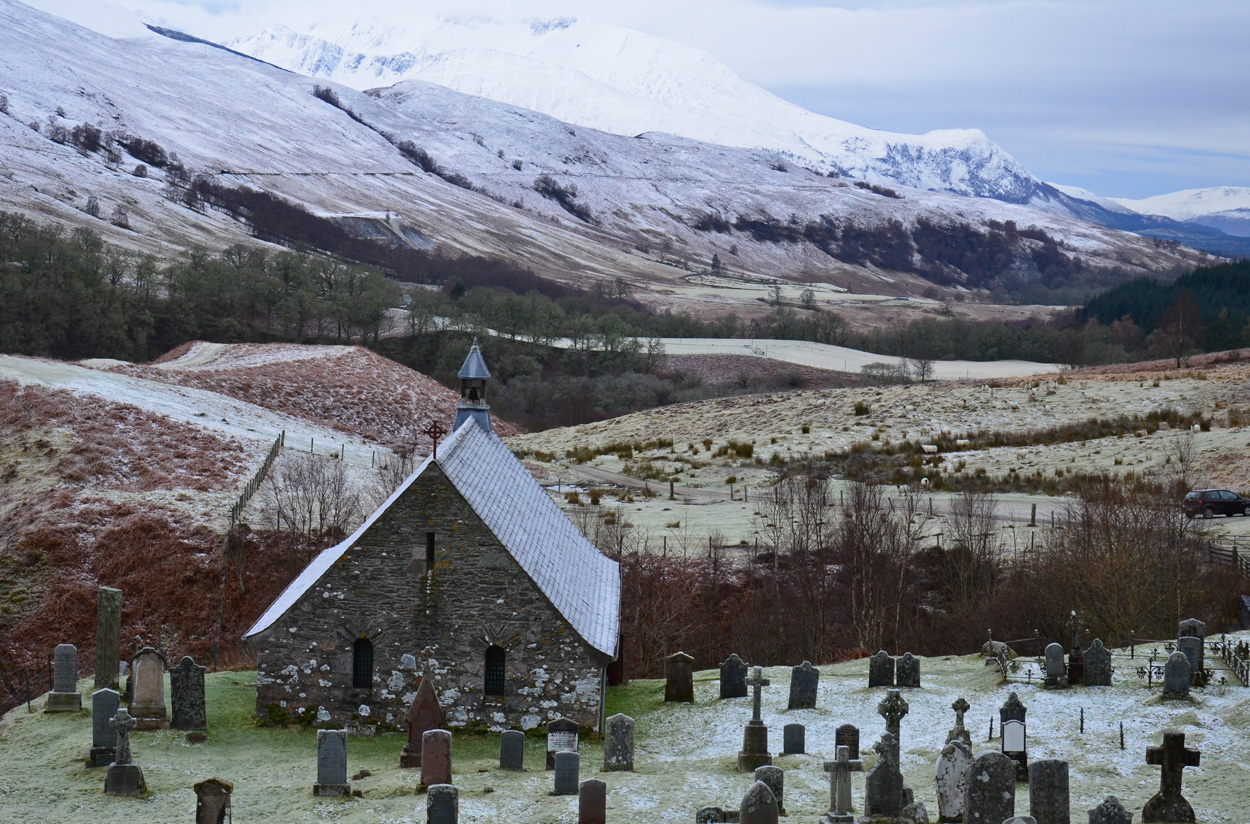
Cille Choirill and churchyard

Cille Choirill is a 15th-century Roman Catholic church situated in Glen Spean in Lochaber, Scotland. Dedicated to St Caireall mac Curnain of what is now County Galway, (also called "Cyril"), it was possibly built by Cameron of Lochiel.

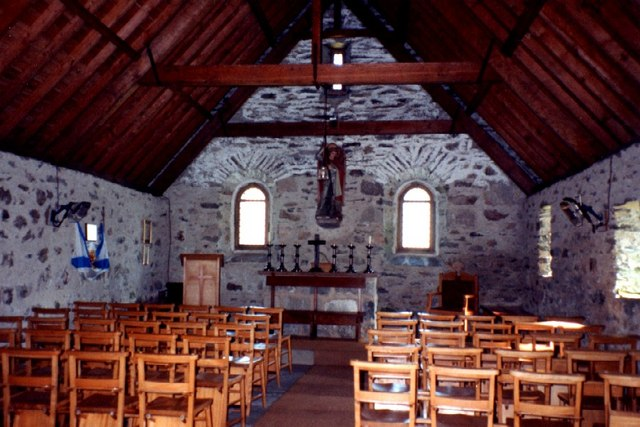
Interior of Cille Choirill

A probable reference to the church occurs in a papal supplication dated June 1466 when a priest asked for provision to the parish church of Lochaber and its chapel of 'Querelo'. After lying roofless for some time, it was repaired in 1932/33 with financial support from Nova Scotian descendants of Lochaber emigrants.

Situated in the Roman Catholic parish of St Margaret's, and the former civil parish of Kilmonivaig, mass is offered there once per month during the summer.

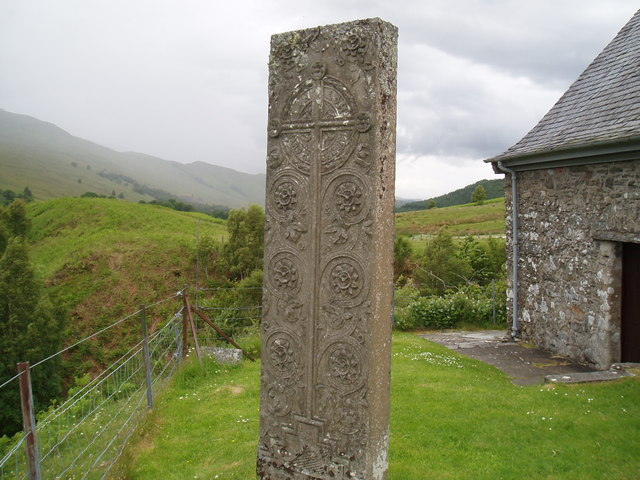
Memorial to Iain Lom

It is an important location to Scottish Gaelic literature, as the poets Iain Lom and Dòmhnall Mac Fhionnlaigh nan Dàn lie buried in the churchyard.
