= Patrick d'Arcy =

Irish mathematician

Patrice d'Arcy
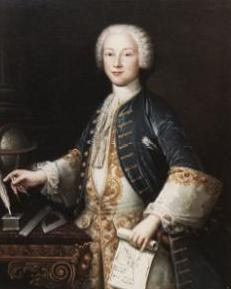
- M. d'Arcy, by Hubert Drouais (1742).
- Born: Patrick Darcy; 27 September 1725; Kiltullagh, County Galway, Ireland
- Died: 18 October 1779 (54 years old); Paris (France)

Patrick d'Arcy (27 September 1725 – 18 October 1779) was an Irish mathematician born at Kiltullagh House, near Kiltullagh, County Galway in the west of Ireland. His family, who were Catholics, suffered under the penal laws. In 1739, d'Arcy was sent abroad by his parents to an uncle in Paris. He was tutored in mathematics by Jean-Baptiste Clairaut, and became a friend of Jean-Baptiste's son, Alexis-Claude Clairaut, (Alexis Clairaut), who was a brilliant young mathematician.

D'Arcy made original contributions to dynamics. He is best known for his part in the discovery of the principle of angular momentum, in a form which was known as "the principle of areas," which he announced in 1746. See the article on areal velocity. D'Arcy also had an illustrious military career in the French army. He obtained the title of "Count" in the French nobility. He was a generous patron of Irish refugees in France. In addition to his contributions to dynamics, he performed research on artillery and on electricity.

D'Arcy was elected to the Academie Royale des Sciences in 1749.

In 1768, the Academie published a 1765 paper by D'Arcy on the duration of visual impressions. He had built a kind of mill in his garden, which would whirl a burning coal around, and measured the duration of one rotation when it was spinning just fast enough to give the impression of a full fiery circle, as seen in the dark from a circa 50 meter distance. With the collaboration of an observer with better eyesight than D'Arcy, the mean duration came to 0.13 seconds. D'Arcy planned further experiments to measure the suspected differences between individuals, colors, viewing distances and light intensity of objects. D'Arcy's experiments relate to theories of persistence of vision that were popularised with the introduction of philosophical toys like the thaumatrope in the 19th century, and the subsequent development of cinematography. However, many historians have ignored D'Arcy and other early researchers, giving in to some nationalistic prejudice to champion some other "great man" from nationalistic prejudice, or to the tendency to produce a more coherent chronological narrative.

D'Arcy died from cholera in Paris in October 1779.

There is a copy of a portrait of d'Arcy in Wade (1997), , which was found in Charbonnier (1928).
