= Tom Donoghue =

Irish hurler

Tom Donohue
Personal information
- Native name: Tomás Ó Donnchú (Irish)
- Born: 24 January 1951 (age 75) Galway, County Galway, Ireland
- Occupation: P.E. Teacher
- Height: 5 ft 8 in (173 cm)

Sport
- Sport: Hurling
- Position: Right corner-back
Clubs
- Years: Club
- Ballinamere; Killimordaly
Club titles
- Offaly titles: 0
Inter-county
Years	County	Apps (scores)
1977–1978 1980–1982	Galway; Offaly	3 (0-00); 11 (0-00)
Inter-county titles
- Leinster titles: 1
- All-Irelands: 1
- NHL: 0
- All Stars: 0

Thomas "Tom" Donohue (born 24 January 1951) is an Irish retired hurler who played as a right corner-back for the Offaly senior team.

Donohue began his sporting career in his home county of Galway, playing hurling at club level with Killimordaly and was later selected to represent his home county. In 1972, he was on the Galway team that defeated Dublin to win their first U-21 All-Ireland hurling final.

In 1976, Donohue was offered a permanent teaching position in Tullamore, County Offaly and joined Ballinamere GAA club some time later. From there, he was selected for the Offaly senior hurling panel and made his first appearance during the 1980-81 National League. He became a regular player for the following two seasons. During that time he won one All-Ireland medal and one Leinster medal.

After his All-Ireland senior hurling win, Donohue undertook training of the Offaly Senior Football panel for the '81/'82 season, when they went on to win the All-Ireland Final against Kerry. The story of that Championship year was later documented by author Michael Foley in the book, 'Kings of September', in which Donohue contributed an account of his experience.

He continued to hurl with the Offaly senior panel until early 1982, making his last appearance in a League match against Waterford in February of that year. Donohue went on to train various club and county teams in both hurling and football. In 1987, he trained the Athenry senior hurling team, who won their first ever County Championship and continued on to win the Connaught Senior Club hurling title.
