= Tynagh =

Tynagh Tíne
- Village
- Location in Ireland
- Coordinates: 53°09′00″N 8°22′23″W
- Country: Ireland
- Province: Connacht
- County: County Galway
- Elevation: 85 m (279 ft)

Population (2016)
  - Rural: 447
- (Electoral Division of Tynagh)
- Time zone: UTC+0 (WET)
  - Summer (DST): UTC-1 (IST (WEST))
- Irish Grid Reference: M621163

Tynagh (Irish: Tíne) is a village and electoral division in south-east County Galway in Ireland. The village is in a townland and civil parish of the same name.

== Origin of the name ==
Recorded as Tyneaach (1565), Teacneaghe (1543), Theaneac (1541), its current name is a contraction of Teach nEachach, 'Eochu's house'. In medieval Irish sources it is referred to as Teach nEachach, or 'the house of Eochu'. It was originally associated with the townland of Lecarrow, one mile east of the village, now named Billew Burial Ground, the word Billew derived from Bileadha, plural of bile, denoting a sacred tree.

The element Eachach refers to Dagda, the supreme deity of the pagan Irish. He is cited as the father of the founder of the church, Brandubh of Tynagh. This suggests that Tynagh was originally a cult centre for the festival of Lughnasa, later Christianised by Brandubh, who was cited as Lugh's son, thus betraying its true origins.

== Geographic area and notable industry ==
From about the 8th or 9th century up to the 17th century, the name of the area it was situated within was Síol Anmchadha. Its kings and lords were the Maddan family.

Situated between the towns of Loughrea (15 km) and Portumna (13 km), the place is probably best known for the Tynagh mines which opened in the 1960s and were an important source of lead and zinc concentrates at that time. From 1965 to 1981 the mines were managed by the Northgate Group subsidiary Irish Base Metals Ltd. For almost twenty years Irish Base Metals Tynagh Ltd was a major source of employment for east Galway. This all changed in 1981, however, when the mines closed with the loss of 350 jobs.

In 2004, after lying dormant for over twenty years, part of the site was redeveloped for industrial use with Sperrin Galvanisers (Ireland) Ltd opening a steel galvanising plant, and Tynagh Energy Ltd a combined cycle gas turbine (CCGT) power plant, the first in Galway.

== Sports ==
Tynagh has very strong hurling links. Between 1920 and 1929 no club in Galway went as long unbeaten in senior hurling. Also during this period, Tynagh had six members on the Galway team that won the All-Ireland Senior Hurling Championship in 1923, another unrivalled county record.

== People with connections to Tynagh ==
Ancestors of two Prime Ministers of Australia have reportedly been from Tynagh.

- Paul Keating (b. 1944), visited the village in 1993; some sources suggest that his paternal grandfather came from Tynagh and that distant cousins of Keating still reside in the area.
- Joseph Aloysius Lyons (1879 – 1939) was connected to the area through his paternal grandfather, Michael Lyons, who emigrated to Australia from Tynagh.

== See also ==
- List of towns and villages in Ireland
- Pallas Castle, close to the village
