= Mo Lua of Kilmoluagh =

Molua of Kilmoluagh was an early Christian missionary among the Soghain people of County Galway.

Molua may have been a native of the kingdom, as a St Moluoc (another form of Molua) is listed as "Moluoc mac Luchta mac Finchada mac Feidlimithe mac Sodhan Salbhuidhe." Sodhán Salbhuidhe na Sreath - Sogan of the Battle-lines/Sogan of the Preys was a semi-legendary son of a king of Ulster whose people settled in what became called the kingdom of Soghain. This is said to have occurred sometime around 300. Thus Molua was a great-great grandson of the founder of the kingdom, which led historian Joseph Mannion to comment that "The brevity of the pedigree might indicate that he belonged to the very early stages of the Christian period", perhaps as early as the late fifth century. It is believed that he was a kinsman of both Kerrill and Cuana of Kilcoonagh.

He is credited with the erection of a cross at Crossmaloo (Cros mo Luaidh), of which only the base and broken lower shaft remains. It is believed to mark his grave, and was once a traditional resting place for funeral processions leading to the church of Kilmoluagh, of which he was the founder. The name Kilmoluagh no longer exists even as a townland name.
