= Tiaquin Demesne =

Townland in County Galway, Ireland

Coordinates: 53°21′36″N 8°39′02″W

Tiaquin Demesne (English: /ˈtiːækwɪn/ TEE-a-kwin) is a townland in the parish of Athenry, County Galway. The Irish form is Tigh Dachoine, which literally translates as "St. Dachonna’s house". It consists of 427 acres (1.73 km^{2}), located 2 miles (3.2 km) southeast of Monivea. It gives its name to the barony of Tiaquin.
