= Aughrim, County Galway =

Village in County Galway, Ireland

Aughrim Eachroim
- Village
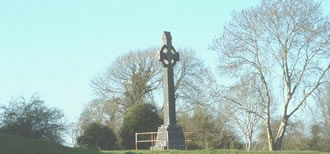
- Aughrim cross

- Location in Ireland
- Coordinates: 53°18′15″N 8°19′00″W
- Country: Ireland
- Province: Connacht
- County: County Galway
- Elevation: 115 m (377 ft)

Population (2011)
  - Rural: 595
- Time zone: UTC+0 (WET)
  - Summer (DST): UTC+1 (IST (WEST))
- Irish Grid Reference: M785281
- Website: www.loughrea.ie

Aughrim (Irish: Eachroim, meaning 'horse ridge') is a small village in County Galway, Ireland. It is located between the towns of Loughrea and Ballinasloe, along the old N6 national primary road (now listed as the R446 regional road) that used to be the main road between Galway and Dublin. According to the Irish census of 2011, the division had a population of 595. The village is in a civil parish of the same name.

It was in Aughrim that the Marquis de St Ruth prepared the Irish Catholic Jacobite troops for the Battle of Aughrim, which was fought during the Williamite war in Ireland on 12 July 1691. Two ringforts located to the south (in Attidermot townland) are a National Monument.

== Community organisations ==
Aughrim is the base for the charitable organisation Sunflowers Chernobyl Appeal which carry out voluntary work in areas in Belarus affected by the Chernobyl nuclear disaster.

== Transportation ==
=== Road ===
Aughrim is located on the old N6 (R446) Galway to Dublin road, Aughrim is now by-passed by the M6 motorway. The motorway was opened on 23 July 2009 (Athlone to Ballinasloe) and 18 December 2009 (Ballinasloe to Galway). It is located approximately 5.5 kilometers from the Ballinasloe West M6 Junction (J15).

=== Bus ===
Aughrim is served by Bus Eireann (routes 20 & 20x) and by private bus with CityLink (763) serving Aughrim on their Dublin to Galway routes.

== Holy Trinity Church ==
Holy Trinity Church is the Church of Ireland parish church for Aughrim. It was built in 1819 and consecrated on Trinity Sunday 1819 and it was therefore called Holy Trinity. It is cruciform in shape and is still in use as a parish church Rectors of Holy Trinity Church have included Rev. Henry Martin (1819–1845) and the Very Rev. John Fiennes Twisleton Crampton (1845–1888).

== Abbots and Bishops of Aughrim ==
- c.500 – Connell of Aughrim, Bishop and founder.
- 736 – Flann Aighle, Bishop.
- 746 – Maelimarchair, Bishop.
- 782 – Rechtabhra mac Dubbchomar, Abbot.
- 809 – Maelduin of Aughrim, Bishop and Airchinneach (Erenagh)

== Notable people ==
- John Doogan (1853–1940) – recipient of the Victoria Cross
- Aodh mac Aidmhire (fl. c. 600) – Irish dynast or ruler
- William James MacNeven (1763–1841) – Republican negotiator during the 1798 Rising

== See also ==
- List of towns and villages in Ireland
