= Moel =

Moel may refer to:

- Mohel, the person performing the Jewish ritual of circumcision
- Saint Mel, a 5th-century Irish religious figure
- In Welsh placenames, a bare hill
- Ministry of Employment and Labor, a cabinet ministry in South Korea
