= Killimordaly =

Village in County Galway, Ireland

Coordinates: 53.307°N 8.621°W

Killimordaly (Irish: Cill Íomair Uí Dhálaigh, meaning 'Iomar's church of O'Daly') is a rural village and civil parish in County Galway, Ireland. It was originally located in Trícha Máenmaige.

== See also ==
- Íomar of the Sogain
- List of towns and villages in Ireland
