= Clonfert =

Village and church in County Galway, Ireland

Coordinates: 53°11′56.76″N 8°07′39″W

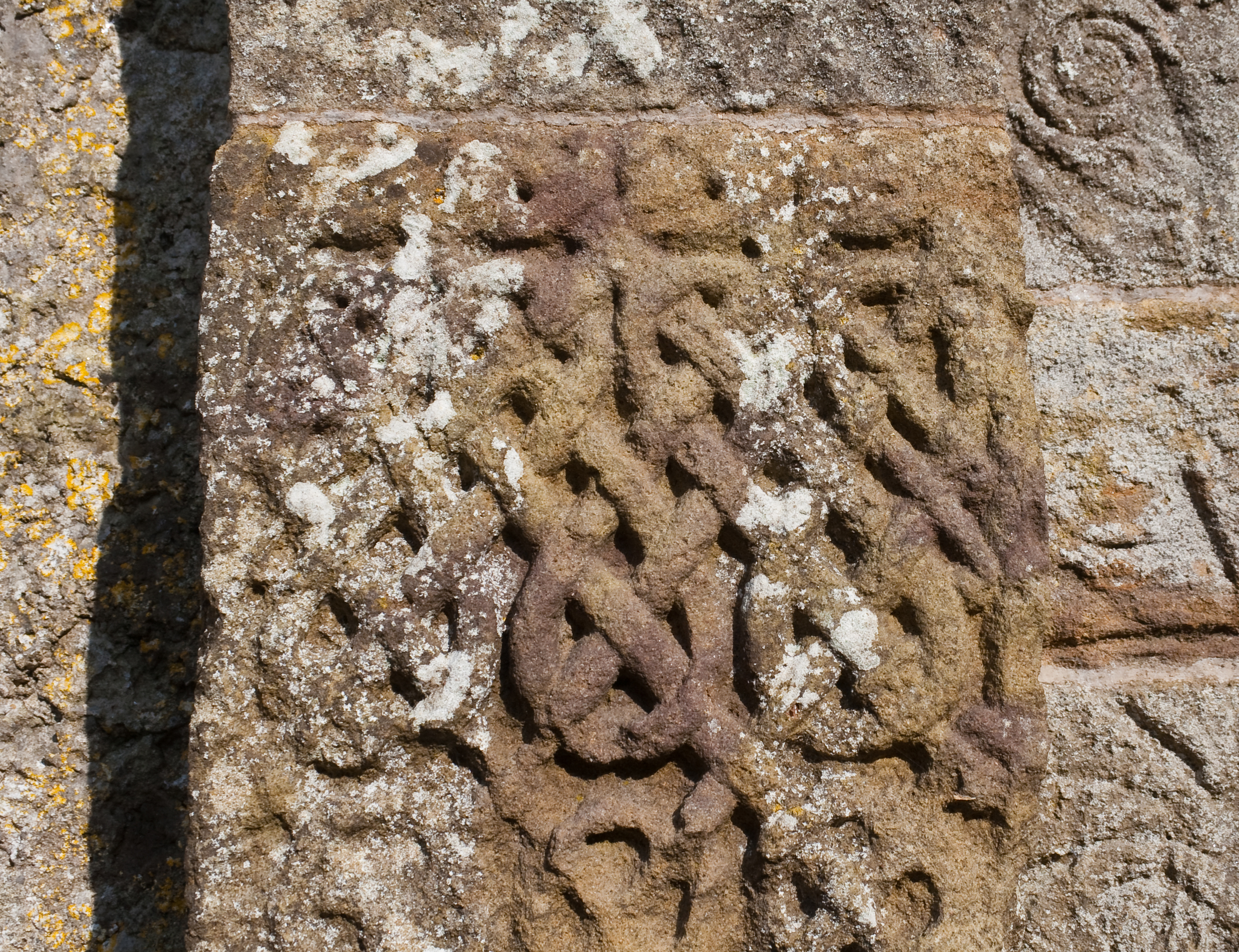
Clonfert Cathedral Portal Left Jamb Interlace Pattern

Clonfert (Irish: Cluain Fearta) is a small village in east County Galway, Ireland, halfway between Ballinasloe and Portumna. The village gives its name to the Diocese of Clonfert. Clonfert Cathedral is one of the eight cathedral churches of the Church of Ireland, Diocese of Limerick and Killaloe. The cathedral of the Roman Catholic Diocese of Clonfert is located in Loughrea and is home to the Shrine of Our Lady of Clonfert. Three churches lay in this parish, St. Brendan's Eyrecourt, St. Francis Meelick and Clonfert. Its current parish priest (2021) is Fr. Declan McInerney and its bishop Michael Duignan. The village is in a civil parish of the same name.

== Notable people ==
- Maeineann of Clonfert

== See also ==
- List of towns and villages in Ireland
