= Kilconnell Abbey =

Ruined Franciscan friary in Galway, Ireland

Coordinates: 53.3327°N 8.4009°W

- Mainistir Chill Chonaill
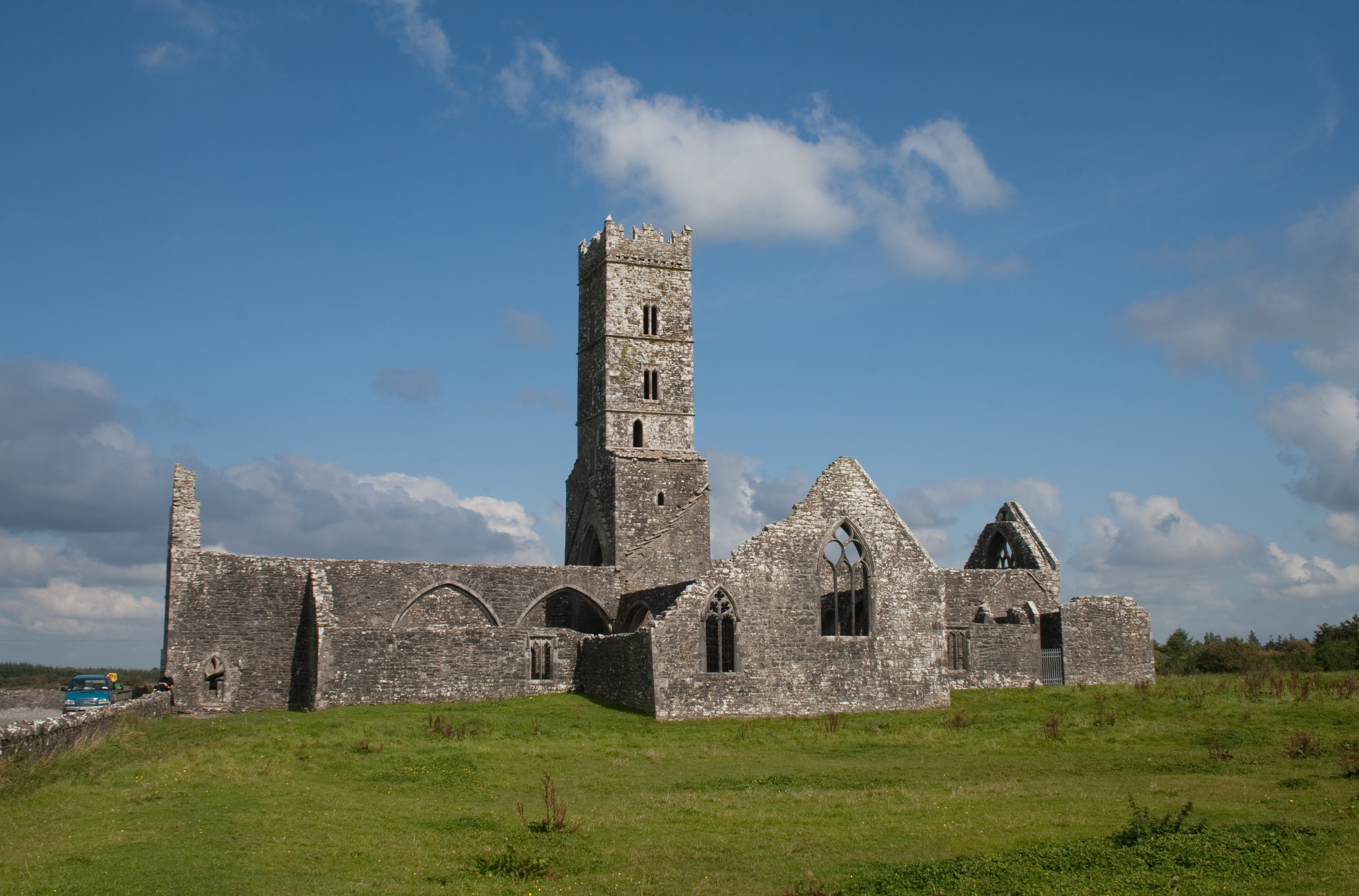
- The south range of the friary in 2009
- Interactive map of Kilconnell Abbey

Monastery information
- Order: Franciscan
- Denomination: Roman Catholic Church
- Established: 1353

Architecture
- Status: Inactive

Kilconnell or Killconnell Abbey (Irish: Mainistir Chill Chonaill) is a ruined medieval Franciscan friary located in Kilconnell, County Galway, Ireland.

== History ==
Kilconnell Abbey was founded by William Buí O'Kelly between 1353 and 1414. The Observant reform was introduced at some point prior to 1464. In the 1680s the abbey underwent repairs.

Following the Bishops' Banishment Act of 1697, the Franciscan community largely dispersed from the area. Though local tradition identifies the departure of the monks from the abbey as being just before the Battle of Aughrim in 1691, in reality the friars were present until at least 1766, when there were ten friars working in the area, though by 1801 the last of the friars had left the area.

Writing in 1901, the abbey ruins were described as being in a near perfect state of preservation. In 1978, Patrick Conlan stated that though the some sections of the cloister were missing, the east range of the convent and the church (including the tower and transept chancel) were complete.

== Historical artefacts ==
A number of artefacts, including chalices and several books were associated with the friary. One of these chalices, known as the Frances Guiffe chalice, dates from 1638 and is in the keeping of the University College Dublin. Another, the Irish Provincial Chalice, also known as the Terlagh O Briene chalice, is in possession of the Australian Catholic University.
