= Connell of Aughrim =

Early Irish saint

Connell, a.k.a. Saint Connell, was a late 5th-early 6th century missionary among the Soghain of what is now County Galway.

Nothing appears to be known of the background of Connell. He was appointed Bishop of Aughrim by Saint Patrick; the site of his church is now believed to be at Foats or Levallynearl townland in the parish. The adjoining parish of Clontuskert contains the townlands of Crossconnell More and Crossconnell Beg, which commemorate his name. Aughrim parish is bordered on the north by the parish of Kilgerrill, and there is a tradition concerning a dispute between Connell and Saint Kerrill, though this tradition is believed to have its roots in a dispute between the parishes as much as a thousand years later.

According to Joseph Mannion:

"... it is clear that St Kerrill and St Connell were contemporaries of St Patrick and as such they belonged to the fifth century. Both were disciples of his who were raised to the episcopate and placed over churches by him. Their respective ecclesiastical territories are likely to have bordered each other at the Ballinure river which formed part of the southern boundary of Sodhan. Under these circumstances one cannot rule out the possibility of conflict arising over disputed areas of jurisdiction which would have given rise to the legendary disagreement between these two fifth-century evangelists."

In the life of Saint Attracta it is told that she "approached her brother, St Connell, seeking permission to erect a nunnery close to his own foundation. He prevailed upon St. Dachonna (Conainne) to request his sister not to build in the area. St Attracta complied with her brother's wishes but was very displeased and is said to have denounced his church."

Since the 16th century he has mistakenly been credited with the foundation of Kilconnell, which was instead founded by Conainne, a female missionary.

Preceded by new creation	Bishop or Abbot of Aughrim c. 500	Succeeded by Flann Aighle
