= Soghain =

Kin group in early Ireland

The Soghain were a people of ancient Ireland. The 17th-century scholar Dubhaltach Mac Fhirbhisigh identified them as part of a larger group called the Cruithin. Mac Fhirbhisigh stated that the Cruithin included "the Dál Araidhi [Dál nAraidi], the seven Lóigisi [Loígis] of Leinster, the seven Soghain of Ireland, and every Conaille that is in Ireland."

== Name ==
Their name, also spelled Sogain or Sodhan, means "good fortune, prosperity"; it is pronounced [ˈso.ɣənʲ], approximatedly SO-in.

== Locations ==
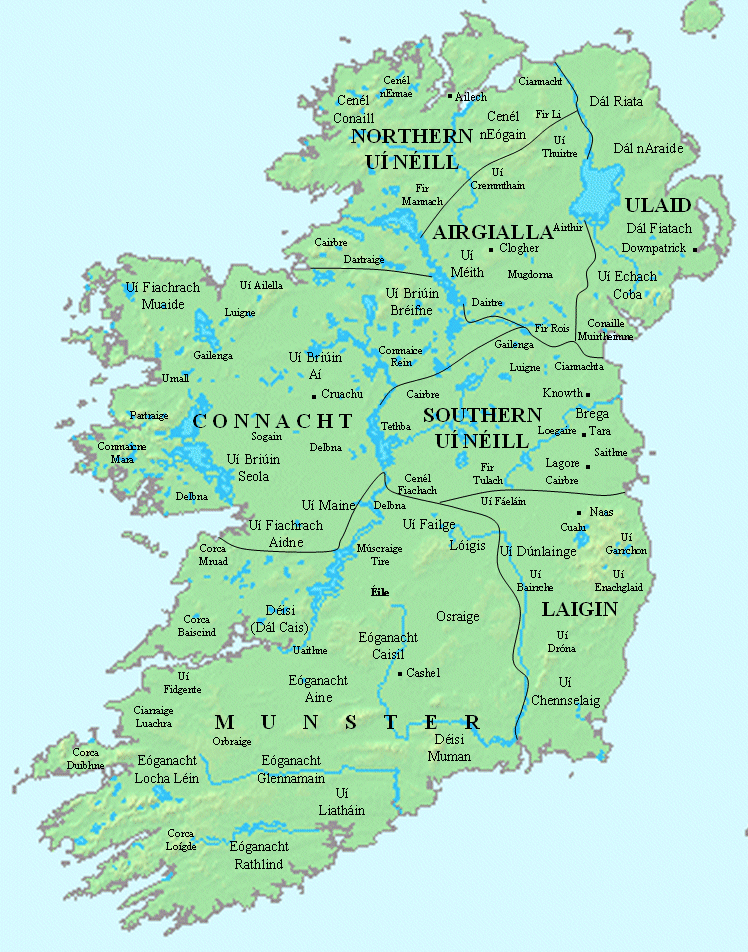
Early peoples and kingdoms of Ireland, c. 800

The locations of four of the seven Soghain are as follows:

- A branch in the territory of Fernmag (barony of Farney, County Monaghan).
- In Delvin (County Westmeath) where a Soghain tribe lived with a branch of the Delbhna in an area called Trícha cét na Delbna Móire agus na Sogan.
- The Corcu Shogain, who were subject to the Benntraige under the Eoghanacht. An Ogham inscription discovered near Aglish in the barony of East Muskerry, some twelve miles west of the city of Cork, displays the words MUCOI SOGINI, which probably means "of the Corcu Sogain".
- The Soghain of Connacht were located in central east County Galway, in a kingdom called Soghan.

== Soghan ==
The Soghain of Connacht were located in the ancient kingdom of Soghan, an area in central east County Galway bounded by the river Suck on the east, the river Clare on the west, the Grange and Shiven rivers to the north, and the Raford and Ballinure rivers to the south. A poem recorded in The Book of Uí Maine, Cruas Connacht clanna Sogain, lists the kingdom's boundaries, which can be found to tie in with the above locations:

From Áth an Ibar west
To Glais Uair Arnaigh
Was the extent of Soghan
That sword-guarded land.

From Béal na Róbe in Máenmagh
To the clear, soft-reeded Simin
Was the breath of the plain
Which bore no ignominy.

The previous, pre-Gaelic people of the area were called the Senchineoil. Very little information survives on them.

The Soghain of Connacht were described by Seán Mór Ó Dubhagáin in his poem Triallam timcheall na Fodla as follows: "The six Sogain let us not shun / Their kings are without oblivion / Good the host of plundering excursions / To whom the spear-armed Sogain is hereditary."

The Book of Lecan lists their six branches as Cenél Rechta, Cenél Trena, Cenél Luchta, Cenél Fergna, Cenél Domaingen and Cenél Déigill.

The genealogy of Saint Kerrill of Clonkeenkerrill is given as Caireall mac Curnáin mac Treana mac Fionnchada mac Náir mac Earca mac Tiobraide mac Soghain Salbhuidhe mac Fiacha Araidhe. His grandfather, Treana mac Fionnchada, was the eponym of the Cinel Trena, who were apparently located close to Knockma, as evinced by the placename Tír Mhic Trena (the land of the sons of Trena). This area was the western limit of the kingdom of the Connacht Soghain.

Early Christian evangelists among the Soghain included Conainne, St Connell and Kerrill. Their successors include Naomhéid, Cuana of Kilcoonagh, Dubhán, Felig, Íbar, Íomar of the Sogain, Laisren of Clonkeenkerrill, Maol Chosna, Modiúit, Menott, Molua of Kilmoluagh.

Parishes known to be included in Soghan were:

- Abbeyknockmoy
- Abbert / Monivea
- Ahascragh
- Athenry
- Ballymacward
- Clonkeenkerrill
- Fohenagh
- Kilcloony
- Kilconnell
- Kilgerrill
- Killascobe
- Killosolan
- Kilmoylan (part)
- Lackagh (part)
- Moylough

Soghan became subject to the Uí Maine sometime during the first millennium.

== Descendants ==
Descendants of the Soghain are still found in great numbers in County Galway, bearing names such as Ó Mainnín, Mannion, Manning, Ward / Mac an Bhaird, Gill / Gillane, Scarry, Dugan / Duggan, Megan / McGann, Martin, and Cassain.

== Annalistic references ==
- 811. Irghalach, son of Maelumha, lord of Corca Soghain

== See also ==
- Clann Fhergail
- Uí Fiachrach Aidhne
- Clann Taidg
- Conmhaicne Mara
- Delbhna Tir Dha Locha
- Maolán
- Muintir Murchada
- Trícha Máenmaige
- Uí Díarmata
- Cóiced Ol nEchmacht
- Síol Anmchadha
- Maigh Seola
- Cenél Áeda na hEchtge
- Pre-Norman invasion Irish Celtic kinship groups, from whom many of the modern Irish surnames came from
