= Conainne =

Irish missionary and saint

Saint Conainne or Dachonna
- Born: ? (6th century AD); County Clare (probably)
- Residence: Soghain area of County Galway, Ireland
- Died: unknown (6th century)
- Venerated in: Catholic Church, Eastern Orthodox Church
- Feast: 8 March
- Patronage: East and Central County Galway

Conainne, also known as Dachonna, (fl. c. 500) was an Irish missionary and saint. The Irish terms of endearment, mo and do, were regularly added to the names of Irish saints and secular people, hence the origin of her diminutive pseudonym, Dachonna.

Conainne was a female missionary who evangelised in the Soghain area of County Galway. She founded a church at Cell Conainne ('the church of Conainne'), modern-day Kilconnell, it appears that the name of the more widely known St Connell was by error substituted for Connainne/Dachonna after the 16th century.

The Martyrology of Oengus says she was of the Uí Maine, and lists her under the date 8 March, stating:

Conainne, i.e., of Cell Conainne in Húi Maini of Connaught, i.e. in Sogan, a daughter of the mother of Senán of Inis Cathaigh.

She was a stepsister of Saint Senan. The Life of Saint Attracta states that Attracta approached her brother Bishop Conal of Drumconnell and sought permission to erect a nunnery close to his own foundation. He prevailed upon St. Conainne to request Attracta not to build in the area. St Attracta complied with her brother's wishes but was very displeased and is said to have denounced his church.

The barony of Tiaquin takes it name from Tigh Dachaoine or Saint Dachonna’s House. It is thought that a children's burial ground may mark the site of the church. Furthermore, the burial ground itself is called Leacht an Óra ("the stone monument of adoration")

== See also ==
- Kerrill
- Maolán
- Ríoch
- Téach
- Enda of Aran
