= Kilconnell =

Village in County Galway, Ireland

Kilconnell Cill Chonaill
- Village
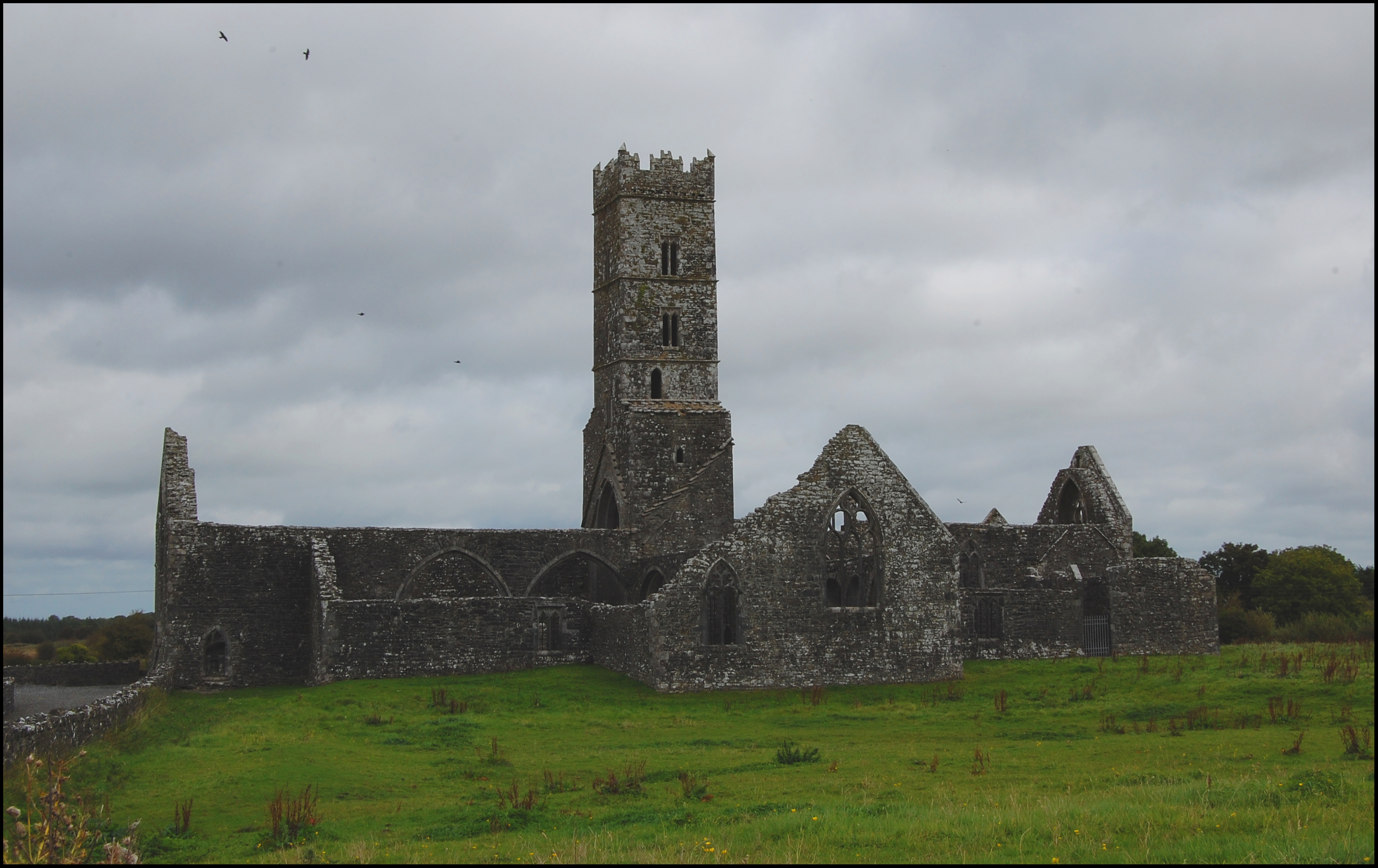
- The ruins of Kilconnell Abbey lie just outside the village

- Location in Ireland
- Coordinates: 53°19′47″N 8°24′15″W
- Country: Ireland
- Province: Connacht
- County: County Galway
- Elevation: 83 m (272 ft)
- Time zone: UTC+0 (WET)
  - Summer (DST): UTC-1 (IST (WEST))
- Irish Grid Reference: M739314

Kilconnell (Irish: Cill Chonaill, meaning 'St Conal's church') is a small rural village in County Galway, Ireland. It is 12 km west of Ballinasloe, on the R348 road.

== History and name ==
The village gives its name to the barony of Kilconnell, formerly held by the Lords de Freyne. The village is in a civil parish of the same name.

The area was once part of the kingdom of the Soghain of Connacht before being conquered by the Uí Maine. The area around Kilconnell was the stronghold of the O'Kellys, lords of Uí Maine and the Donnellan clans.

Evidence of ancient settlement in the area includes a number of ringfort, holy well and standing stone sites in the surrounding townlands of Abbeyfield, Ballinderry, Ballyglass, Corraneena, Glebe and Ellagh. A wayside cross, located at a crossroads in the village within Corraneena townland, was originally erected in 1682. A nearby lake, Lough Acalla, has a crannog site in its centre and is now a rainbow trout fishery.

Kilconnell is in the Catholic parish of Aughrim and Kilconnell. The last known prosecution of a priest under the Popery Acts was the trial in 1822 of Fr John O'Connor, parish priest of Aughrim and Kilconnell, at the Galway Summer Assizes. He was acquitted. Nearby Aughrim was the site of a decisive battle of the Williamite wars, the Battle of Aughrim, in 1691. Hundreds of the O'Kellys died in the battle.

Kilconnell village was the birthplace of Fianna Fáil Teachta Dála (TD) Johnny Callanan (1910–1982). His nephew Joe Callanan (b.1949) was also a TD for Galway East.

== Kilconnell Abbey ==
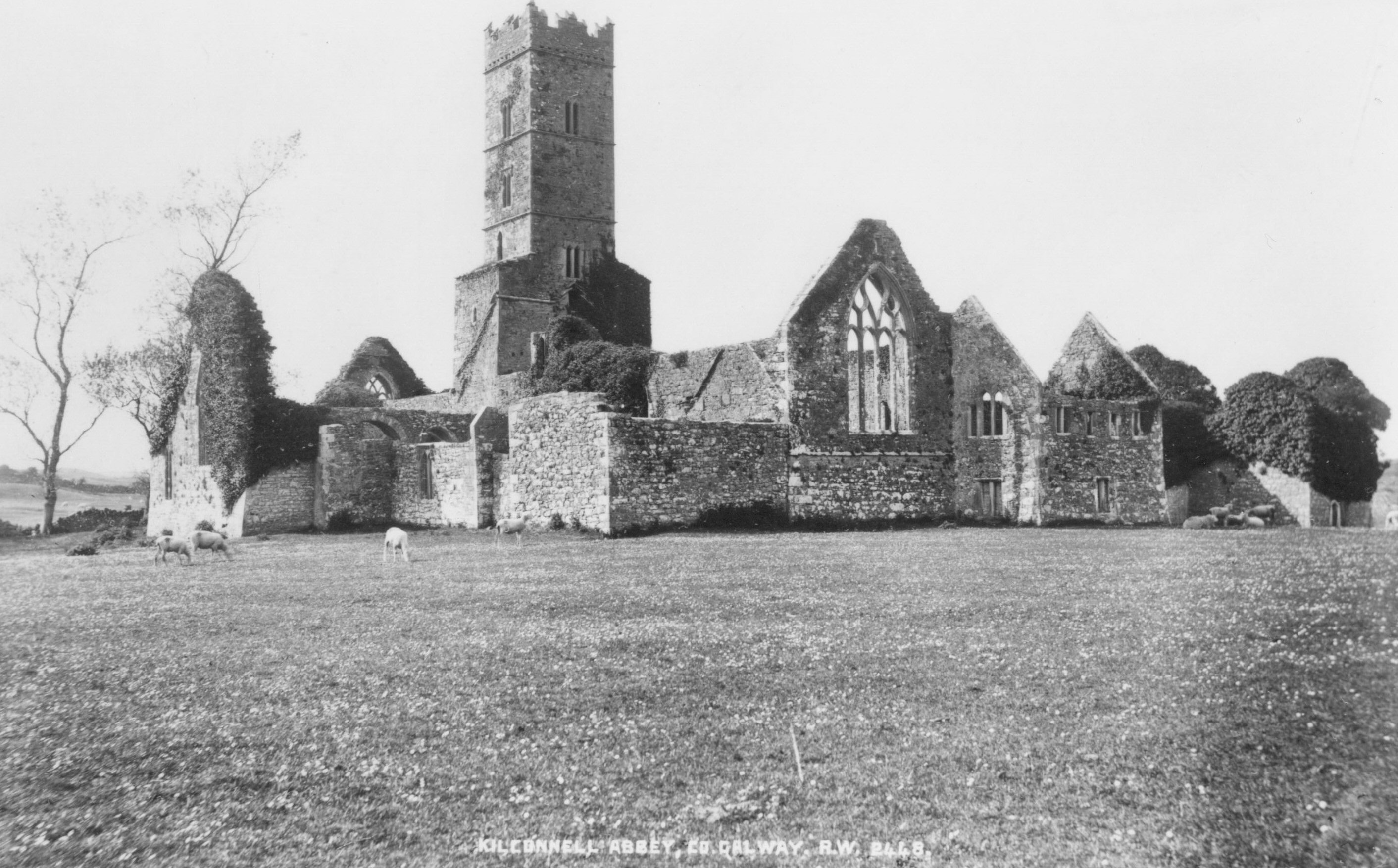
Kilconnell Abbey in 1900

Kilconnell Abbey is a Franciscan friary, founded in 1414, by William O'Kelly, Lord of Uí Maine. The remains of the abbey are maintained by the Office of Public Works. The abbey is the burial place for the O'Kelly sept, whose family crest can be seen on some of the headstones. In the 1580s and 1590s, Charles Calthorpe, the Attorney General for Ireland, held the abbey on a 21-year lease.

The Papal Nuncio Archbishop Giovanni Rinuccini stayed in the abbey on 20 June 1648 on his way back from the Confederation at Kilkenny.

The abbey is believed to have been uninhabited since about 1785.

== Sport ==
The local Gaelic Athletic Association (GAA) team is called St. Gabriels. In 1979, the club won a Galway football title. Since then, they have won the Junior B championship and Junior A league. They won "underage club of the year" in 2011. St Gabriels Ladies GAA football club plays Gaelic football and represents the parishes of Kilconnell, Aughrim, Kilreekil and Cappataggle. St Gabriels Ladies GAA Football Club plays its home games in Aughrim and it trains also in Kilconnell at the St Gabriel's sports complex.

== See also ==
- Ballinderry Park, a nearby guesthouse
- List of abbeys and priories in Ireland (County Galway)
- List of towns and villages in Ireland
