= Ballymacward =

Village in County Galway, Ireland

Coordinates: 53°23′N 8°29′W

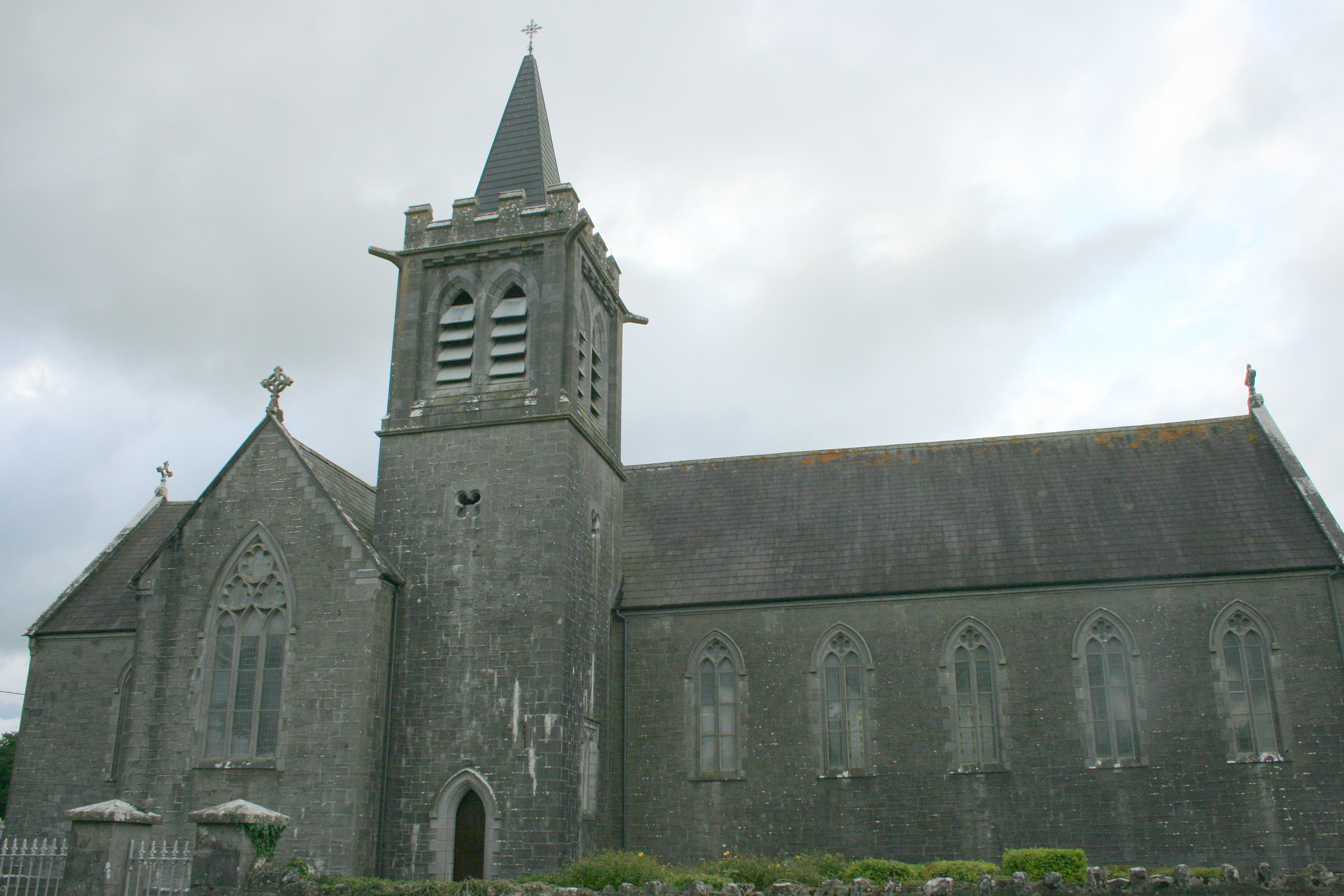
Ballymacward Church

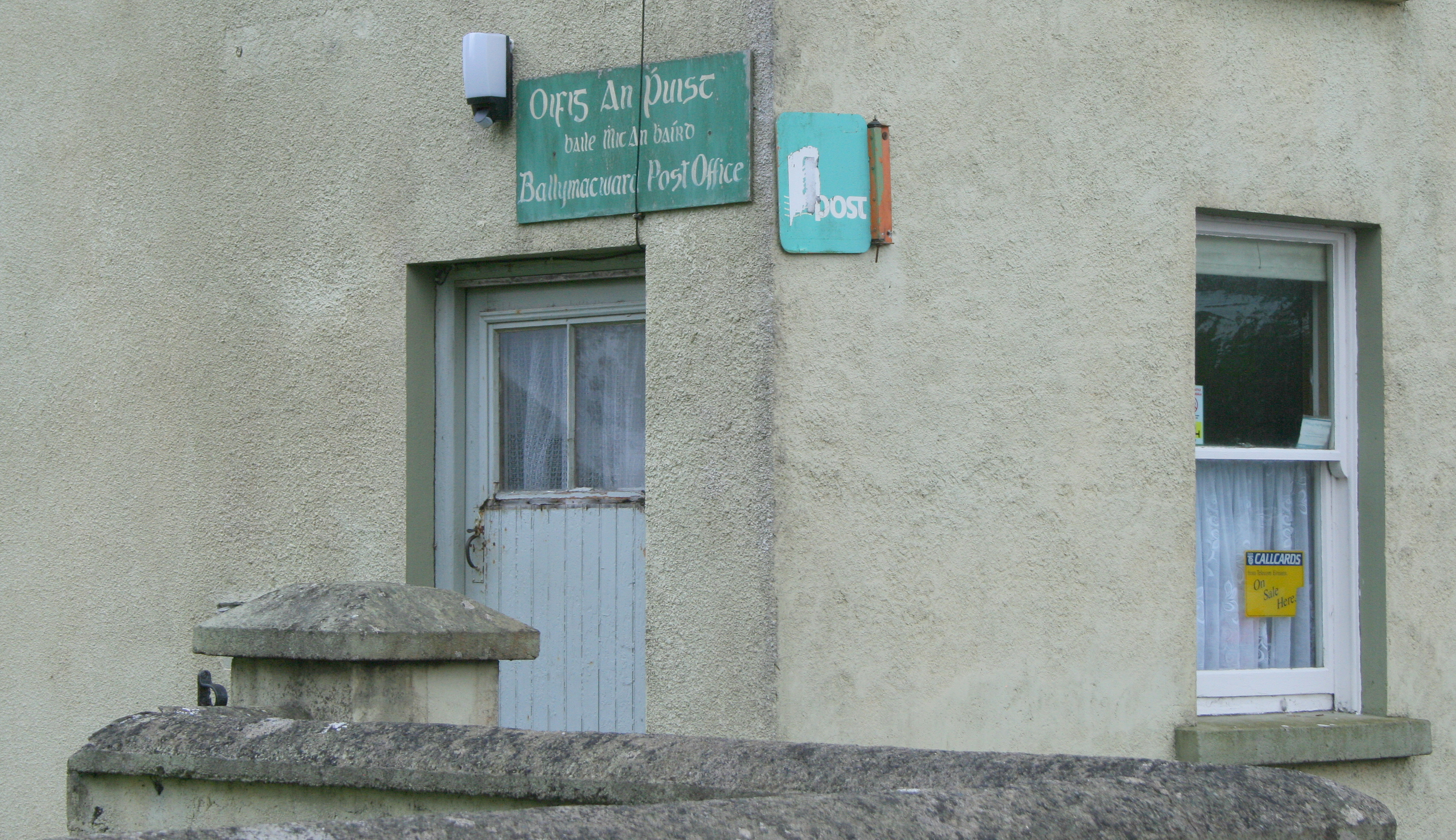
Ballymacward Post Office

Ballymacward (Irish: Baile Mhic an Bháird) is a village in County Galway, Ireland. It is on the R359 road, between that road and the rail lines traversing east–west. The village is 24 km (15 mi) from Ballinasloe and approximately 48 km (30 mi) from Galway city. The village is in a civil parish of the same name. It was once part of the kingdom of the Soghain of Connacht.

Ballymacward lies 4 km (2.5 mi) north of Woodlawn railway station. This station opened in 1858 and was closed for goods traffic in 1978. It is on the main Iarnród Éireann Intercity line from Dublin to Galway, situated between Ballinasloe and Attymon halt stations.

== See also ==
- List of towns and villages in Ireland
