= Kerrill =

Saint Kerrill aka Caireall mac Curnain was a Christian missionary in what is now east County Galway, alive in the mid-to-late 5th century.

His feast day is June 13th. To celebrate the parishioners walk four miles from St Michael’s Church, Gurteen to St Kerrill’s holy well, stopping five times to plant crosses and pray, as Kerrill himself did. The water from the well is said to protect homes from lightning. This tradition was televised by RTÉ in 2004.

== Origins ==
Caireall mac Curnain was a member of the Soghain people of Ireland, specifically those located in the kingdom of that name in what is now east County Galway. Dubhaltach Mac Fhirbhisigh identified them as part of a larger group called the Cruithin, and stated of them:

"Of the Cruithin of Ireland are the Dál Araidhi (Dál nAraidi), the seven Lóigisi of Leinster, the seven Soghain of Ireland, and every Conaille (see Conaille Muirtheimne) that is in Ireland."

The Soghain of Connacht were described by Seán Mór Ó Dubhagáin in his poem Triallam timcheall na Fodla where he states that:

"The six Sogain let us not shun/their kings are without oblivion/Good the host of plundering excursions/to whom the spear-armed Sogain is hereditary."

While the Book of Lecan lists their six branches as Cinel Rechta, Cinel Trena, Cinel Luchta, Cinel Fergna, Cinel Domaingen and Cinel Deigill.

Kerrill's genealogy is given as Caireall mac Curnain mac Treana mac Fionnchada mac Nair mac Earca mac Tiobraide mac Sodhain Salbhuidhe mac Fiacha Araidhe. His grandfather, Treana mac Fionnchada, was the eponym of the Cinel Trena, who were apparently located close to Knockma as evinced by the placename Tír Mhic Trena (the land of the sons of Trena). It is believed that he was a kinsman of both Mo Lua of Kilmoluagh and Cuana of Kilcoonagh.

== Mission ==
Local tradition maintains that Saint Patrick did extensive missionary work among the Soghain. Kerrill was a disciple of Saint Benan of Kilbennan, Tuam. Benen was born in Tír Ailill, County Sligo, though his mother was from Kilbennan. Benen's grandfather, Lughaidh mac Netach, gave his fort at Kilbennan to St. Patrick to establish a fort over which he placed Benen, who set it up as a training school for evangelists.

Kerrill was apparently with Patrick when the latter founded a church at Tawnagh, Lough Arrow. Patrick made Kerrill a bishop and placed him in charge of Tawnagh. He also led the nuns who were under the care of Mathona, Benen's sister.

Kerrill was later translated to Soghain, much of which Patrick had apparently reserved for him to evangelise.

Legends told about Kerrill include his fight with an Oll-phéist (terrible serpent) which was devastating the area about Cloonkeen. According to historian Joseph Mannion, the story "is an echo of the enormous struggle which took place between Christianity and Paganism and the defeat of the Oll-phéist by St. Kerrill symbolises his success as a Christian missionary in the area. The 'monster' in question, in all probability, refers to some pagan deity that was worshipped at this place in pre-Christian times ... Many similar stories are told ... at different locations throughout the country."

Kerrill is portrayed as having a rivalry with St Connell, whose eccleastical territory bounded Kerrill's. One outcome was a mutual cursing, in which Connell said, "May there be blood shed on every fair day in Kilconnell", to which Connell replied, "May there be a funeral every Monday in Cloonkeen.". To this day no funerals are held in Cloonkeenkerrill on Monday.

Connell has been mistaken for Conainne, a female missionary and founder of Kilconnell.

A miracle told of Kerrill stated that his intercessions with God allowed Cianóg ní Cicharáin to become pregnant after years of a childless marriage. She bore two daughters, who were the respective ancestors of Brian Boru and the Ó Conchobair Kings of Connacht.

Kerrill was important enough to be rated the second Patrick of that fifth (i.e., province).

There is a 14th Century Roman Catholic Church named Cille Choirill in Glen Spean, north of Ben Nevis, in the Lochaber district of the Scottish Highlands. Local tradition maintains that it is named for the same St Kerrill whom it is believed, evangelized in the area before returning to Clonkeenkerril in East Galway. Kerrill made an early foundation at Clonkeeneril and there was a church and a cross base there.

== See also ==
- Maolán
