= Kilconickny =

Civil parish in County Galway, Ireland

- Civil parish
- Location within Ireland
- Coordinates: 53.218317°N 8.62504°W
- Country: Ireland
- Province: Connaught
- County: Galway

Kilconickny is a civil parish in County Galway, Connaught, Ireland.

== Location ==
Kilconickny covers 8,528 acres (3,451 ha). It is mainly within the barony of Dunkellin, but parts are in the baronies of Athenry and Loughrea. It is on the road from Loughrea to Galway, about 2.5 miles (4.0 km) from Loughrea. There is no bog in the parish.

The name in the Irish language is Cill C’nuicne, meaning Conicne's church. The adjoining parishes are Bullaun, Kilchreest, Killeenadeema, Killogilleen, Kiltullagh, Lickerrig and Loughrea. There are graveyards at Bookeen and Tooloobauntemple.

== Historical ==
Nicholas Carlisle in the 1810 Topographical Dictionary of Ireland described the parish as:

KILCONICKNY, in the Barony of Loughrea, Co. of Galway, and Province of Connaught: a V., Episcopally united, about the year 1735, to the Vicarages of Kilconiran, Kiltullagh, and Lickerigg: no Church; Divine Service being performed in Mr. Daly's House of Dunsandel: but a church is about to be built, as soon as Mr. Daly, and other Gentlemen who are willing to contribute, have agreed upon the most convenient site : no Glebe House: a Glebe, of 5 acres, in the parish of Lickerigg, and, of 2 1/2 acres, in the parish of Kilconiran; The Rev. Alexander Macauley, the Incumbent (in 1806), who has cure of souls, in all parts, is resident, and discharges the duties. Kilconickny is in the Dioceses of Clonfert and Kilmacduagh, and Province of Tuam. It is 21/2 m. N. W. from Loughrea. This parish contains 2568 acres of land. The parishes in the Union of Kilconickny are contiguous, and contain about seven miles square.

As of 1837 the parish had 2,666 inhabitants. According to Lewis's Topographical Dictionary of Ireland, 1837,

The principal seats are St. Cleran's, the residence of J. H. Burke, Esq., and Dunsandall, of J. Daly, Esq. The living is a vicarage, in the diocese of Clonfert, episcopally united to the vicarages of Lickerrig, Kiltullagh, and Kilconeran, and in the patronage of the Bishop; the rectory is appropriate to the bishoprick, the deanery, the prebend of Killaspicmoylan, the rectory of Loughrea, and the vicars choral of Christ Church, Dublin. The tithes amount to £243. 12., of which £32. 6. 1¾. is payable to the bishop, £27. 13. 10¼. to the dean, £18. 9. 2¾. to the prebendary, £130. 1. 2¾. to the rector, £7. 7. 8¼. to the lessee of the vicars choral, and £27. 13. 10½. to the vicar: the entire tithes of the benefice amount to £285. 7. 4¾. The church is at Lickerrig, and the Ecclesiastical Commissioners have recently granted £183 for its repair. There is a glebe-house, with a glebe of 7¼ and another of 25 acres in the union. Some remains of the ancient castle of St. Cleran yet exist.

The Kilconickny Loan Fund was one of seven Irish Reproductive Loan Funds in County Galway. It was a microcredit plan that provided small loans to the "industrious poor" in the parishes of Kilconierin, Lickerrig, and Kilconickny between 1838 and 1846. Many of the loans in Kilconickny parish went into default during the Great Famine of 1845 to 1849, mostly due to death (38%), emigration (21%) or poverty (19%).

=== Kilconickny union ===
Records of the clergy of the parishes of Kilconickny union have survived from around 1398. The Anglican Kilconickny union was formed in 1735 when the vicarages of Kilconiran, Kiltullagh and Lickerigg were united. In 1810 there was no church or glebe house in Kilconicky. A church was built at Bookeen in 1815. In 1834 there were 8,806 people in the union, of whom 130 belonged to the Anglican Church of Ireland. Kilconickny union was united with Killinane union in 1906, and in 1933 the church at Bookeen was closed. These were united with Loughrea in 1945. As of 2020 they were part of Aughrim union in the diocese of Clonfert.

=== Clostoken & Kilconieran parish ===
The Catholic parish of Clostoken & Kilconieran has its origins in Isercleran (the hermitage of Cleran), which holds the ruins of an old church from the 8th or 9th century called Kilkisheen (the little Church of the Ford of the Hurdles). The old church is near St. Cleran's House. There were three ecclesiastical parishes in the Middle Ages; Kilconickny (now Clostoken), Kilconieran and Lickerrig (now Carrabane). The three are now united in the large parish of Clostoken & Kilconieran.

== Townlands ==
The townlands in the parish are:

- Ardnadoman East
- Ardnadoman West
- Ballingarry
- Ballybaun
- Ballynamucka
- Blackgarden
- Boherduff
- Bushfield
- Caherhenryhoe
- Cahernaman
- Cahernamona
- Cahernamuck East
- Cahernamuck West
- Cahertinny
- Carrowclogh
- Carrowmore
- Cloghastookeen
- Cloonoo East
- Cloonoo West
- Conicar
- Coorbaun
- Curraghroe
- Doogarraun
- Glenatallan
- Gortawullaun
- Gortnabarnaboy
- Gortsheela
- Kanargad
- Killaspugmoylan
- Kilmurry
- Knockadaumore
- Knockauncoura
- Knockroe
- Knockroebeg
- Lackafinna North
- Lackafinna South
- Lackalea
- Lurgan
- Monearmore
- Raheen Eighter
- Raheen Oughter
- Raruddy East
- Raruddy West
- Srah
- Tonbaun
- Tooloobauntemple

== Sources ==
- Carlisle, Nicholas (1810), A Topographical Dictionary of Ireland ... Being a Continuation of the Topography of the United Kingdom of Great Britain and Ireland, Miller
- Clostoken & Kilconieran, Catholic Diocese of Clonfert
- Dolan, Steve (Summer 2015), "The Reproductive Loan Fund in Kilconierin Parish" (PDF), Newsletter, no. 18, South East Galway Archaeological & Historical Society
- Grenham, John, "Kilconickny civil parish, Galway", johngrenham.com
- Kearney, Gerry (June 2016), "Tracking Parochial Families in Killinane and Kilconickny, County Galway: Local History Using Parish Registers & Gravestone Inscriptions", Archive of the Month
- Lewis, Samuel (1837), "Kilconickny", A Topographical Dictionary of Ireland
