= Killeenadeema =

Civil parish in County Galway, Ireland

Killeenadeema Cillín a Díoma
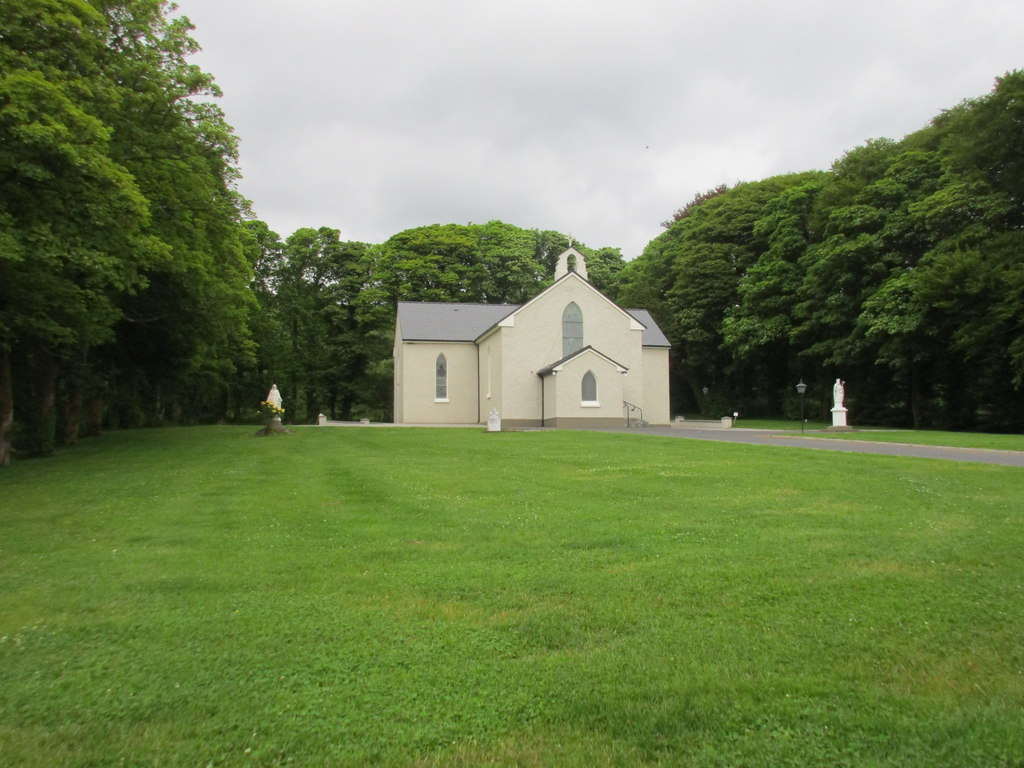
- Church at Derrybrien

- Location in Ireland
- Coordinates: 53°6′35″N 8°35′30″W
- Country: Ireland
- Province: Connacht
- County: Galway
- Baronry: Loughrea

Area
  - Total: 98.9 km^{2} (38.2 sq mi)

Killeenadeema (Irish: Cillín a Díoma) is a civil parish in County Galway, Ireland. It contains most of the Derrybrien mountains, which hold the Derrybrien Wind Farm.

== Name ==
The name in Irish is Chillín a Díoma, where cillín means "little church". Thus, it means "Chapel of Díoma". (Note: Díoma: possibly a variant of Dymphna, the patron saint of the modern chapel in Killeenadeema West.)

== Location ==
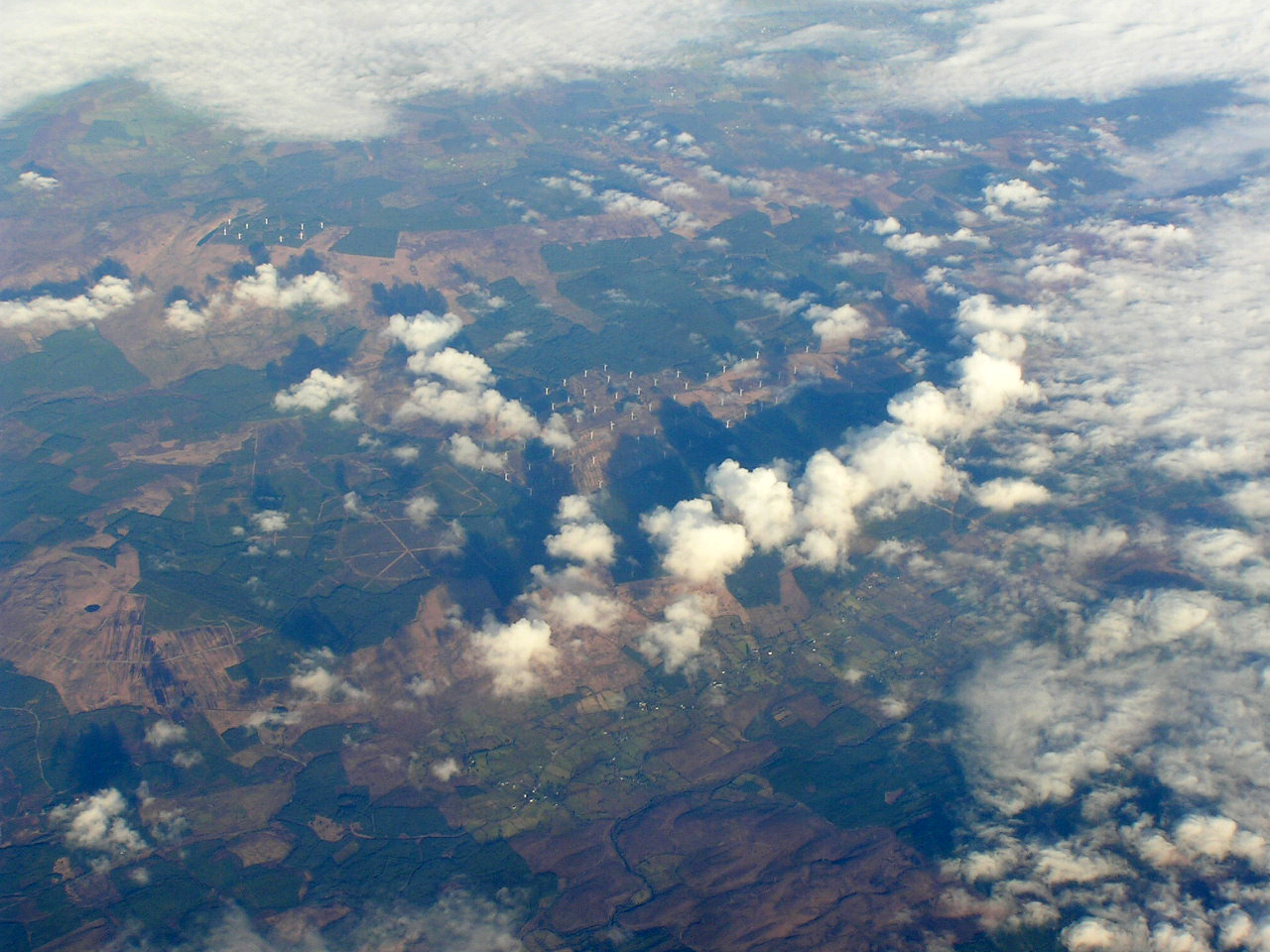
Derrybrien Wind Farm

Killeenadeema is in the barony of Loughrea in County Galway, Ireland. The civil parish has an area of 98.9 square kilometres (38.2 sq mi). The town of Loughrea lies on the north shore of Lough Rea, a lake. Killeenadeema includes the southern part of Lough Rea and extends south to the border with County Clare. It contains the Derrybrien Wind Farm. The R353 road crosses the southern part of the parish, running through Derrybrien.

Adjoining parishes are Ardrahan, Ballynakill (Leitrim barony), Feakle (Clare), Kilchreest, Kilconickny, Killinan, Kilteskill, Kilthomas and Loughrea.

== Church ==
The corresponding Catholic parish is in the Diocese of Clonfert. The Killeenadeema Graveyard about 1 kilometre (0.62 mi) south of the lake contains the ruins of the ancient church of Saint Dimas as well as the more recent Catholic church. Saint Dympna's Church was built around 1830 with a single-bay nave and transepts. In 1920 a shallow canted single-bay apse was added. It is built of limestone, with pitched slate roofs. The interior has a timber battened ceiling, a carved timber gallery, marble altar furniture and very fine stained glass windows. The church is set in a graveyard with many 18th- and 19th-century gravestones, surrounded by a rubble limestone boundary wall.

== Parish in 1837 ==
According to Samuel Lewis in his Topographical Dictionary of Ireland (1837),

KILLEENADEEMA, or KILNADEEMA, a parish, in the barony of LOUGHREA, county of GALWAY, and province of CONNAUGHT, 3 miles (S. by W.) from Loughrea; containing 3554 inhabitants, This parish comprises a considerable portion of the Derrybrian mountains, and contains 1854 statute acres applotted under the tithe act. It is a vicarage, in the diocese of Clonfert, with the greater portion of the rectory united, together forming part of the union of Loughrea; the remainder of the rectory is appropriate to the deanery of Clonfert; the tithes amount to £153. 17. 7-., of which £ 12. 18. 5-., is payable to the dean, and £140. 19. 1-. to the vicar. In the R. C. divisions it is the head of a union or district, comprising also the parish of Kilteskill, and containing chapels at Kildeema, Derrybrian, and Ayle, About 2l0 children are educated in three public schools, to each of which the Earl of Clancarty contributes £5 annually, and about 120 are taught in two private schools.

DERRYBRIEN, an extra-parochial place, in the barony of LOUGHREA, county of GALWAY, and province of CONNAUGHT, about 9 miles (S.) of Loughrea; containing 907 inhabitants. It consists of a range of mountains of the same name, extending from Gort to Woodford, and partly separating the southern part of the county from Clare : there is a good road over them from Woodford to Gort. Here is a R. C. chapel, dependent on that of Killeenadeema.

== Notable people ==
Notable people associated with Killeenadeema include:

- Tony Cummins (1906– 2010), priest and centenarian born in the parish
- Seán Cunningham (1918–1997), Irish cooperative activist and Republican born in the parish
- John Fahy (1893–1969), Irish priest, republican, agrarian and radical
- John Bernard Hynes (1897–1970), mayor of Boston, from a family from the parish
- Edmond MacHugo, 16th-.century Irish Chief who resided at Killeenadeema castle, now destroyed
- Peter Kelly (1847–1908), president of the Gaelic Athletic Association in the late 1880s
- P. J. Kelly (1843–1908), Fenian

== Sources ==
- "Cillín a Díoma", logainm.ie
- "Civil Parish of Killeenadeema, Co. Galway", townlands.ie
- Grenham, John (2021), Killeenadeema civil parish, Galway
- "Killeenadeema Diocese of Clonfert", Catholic Parish Registers at the NLI, National Library of Ireland
- Lewis, Samuel (1837), Topographical Dictionary of Ireland
- "Relation: Killeenadeema (5806409)", OpenStreetMap
