= Tony Cummins =

Irish priest and centenarian

Tony Cummins (6 September 1906 – 20 January 2010) was an Irish priest and centenarian.

Cummins was born in Sonnagh townland in the parish of Killeenadeema, Loughrea, one of three sisters and three sons of Patrick Cummins of Duniry and Elizabeth Egan of Clonlee, a primary school teacher. He was educated at Garbally and Maynooth, been ordained by Bishop Duignan at Loughrea in 1932. He served in the parishes of Clostoken, Loughrea, Killimor, Killeenadeema, and Cappataggle. He retired from there in 1987.

In 2006 he planted a tree with John Kirby, Bishop of Clonfert, to mark his hundredth birthday, at Ballinderry Nursing Home. He died in 2010 aged 103.
