= Frederick Conway =

Frederick or Fred Conway may refer to:

- Frederick B. Conway (1819–1874), American actor
- Frederick William Conway (1782–1853), Irish journalist, newspaper founder and editor
- Frederick Conway (artist) (1900–1973), American artist
- Fred Conway (Aboriginal elder) (born 1944)
