= R380 =

R380 may refer to:

- Ericsson R380, mobile phone made by Ericsson, released in 2000
- Prince R380, racing car built in 1965 by Prince Motor Company
- R380 (South Africa), a Regional Route in South Africa
- N66 road (Ireland), a former national secondary road, now regional road R380
