= N66 road (Ireland) =

Road in Ireland

N66 road
- Bóthar N66

Route information
- Length: 27.655 km (17.184 mi)
- History: Downgraded to R380 in 2017

Location
- Country: Ireland
- Primary destinations: County Galway; Gort, leaves the M18; (R353); Ballaba; Thoor Ballylee; Peterswell; Kilchreest; Lough Rea; Terminates at the N65 at Loughrea

Highway system
- Roads in Ireland; Motorways; Primary; Secondary; Regional

The N66 road was a national secondary road in Ireland.

It latterly linked the M18 at Gort, County Galway to the N65 outside Loughrea at the north of the Loughrea Bypass.

Prior to the construction of the Loughrea Bypass and M18 during the 2000s the N66 ran from the N18 road in Gort to the N6 in Loughrea itself and this was its configuration for most of its lifetime which was from c. 1970 to 2005.

The N65, since 2010, continues north from Loughrea and forms an interchange with the M6. All routings lay entirely within County Galway.

En route it passed Thoor Ballylee, associated with William Butler Yeats.

The road was 27.655 km (17.184 mi) long.

It was downgraded as regional road R380 upon the completion of the M17/M18 scheme in September 2017.

== See also ==
- Roads in Ireland
- Motorways in Ireland
- National primary road
- Regional road
