= Irish loan funds =

- Formation: 1720s
- Dissolved: 1915
- Type: Charity
- Legal status: Defunct
- Headquarters: Dublin Castle
- Region served: Ireland
- Products: Small loans
- Subsidiaries: Local associations

The Irish loan funds (Note: Technically a distinction may be made between reproductive loan funds established under the London Board, which lasted from 1823 to 1848, and other loan funds dating back to the 18th century and later regulated by the Irish Board into the 20th century. The term "reproductive loan fund" was in use well before 1823, and this article uses it for both types of fund.) were microcredit organizations that operated in Ireland between 1720 and 1915. They were run by local associations that made small loans to the industrious poor, and were often very successful. At peak there were about 300 loan funds.

Some of the funds were set up in the 18th century, and many more in the 19th century after regulatory legislation was passed in the wake of the 1822 Irish Famine. The regulations became more restrictive in 1843, perhaps due to pressure from the banks. Over half the loan funds closed due to the new rules combined with the economic disaster of the Great Famine (1845–1849). The remaining loan funds faced growing competition from other sources of credit and the shrinking rural population, but some survived into the 20th century.

Most of the records from the loan funds supervised by the London-based Irish Reproductive Loan Fund Institution before the famine have been preserved and are of great value to people researching their ancestry.

== History ==
=== Early years (1720–1822) ===
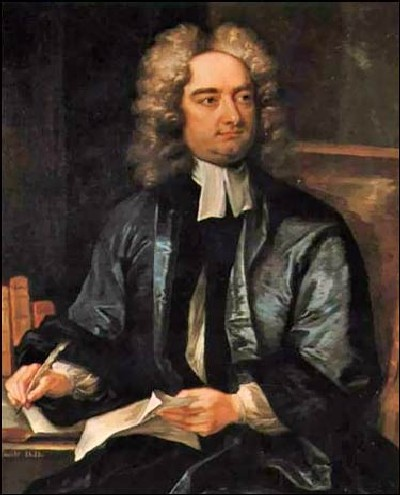
Jonathan Swift (1667–1745) by Charles Jervas

Jonathan Swift (1667–1745) may be credited with starting the loan fund system when he created a small fund with £500 of capital for use by poor but creditworthy people who had projects that promised high return on investment but who lacked collateral. The small loans were made to "poor industrious tradesmen" for reproductive purposes: the seed money would multiply. Swift required borrowers to present a guarantee from two neighbors, "for it was a maxim with him, that any one known by his neighbours to be an honest, sober and industrious man, would readily find such security; while the idle and dissolute would be this means be excluded".

Many similar loan funds were created in the ensuing decades by local volunteer societies. Thus the Dublin Musical Society was incorporated in 1756 to make loans "upon the same system as Dean Swift".

The loans were seen as a low-cost form of relief from poverty. An act of 1778, the Charitable Musical Society Act 1777 (17 & 18 Geo. 3. c. 12 (I)), let the Musical Society appoint persons in other towns "to receive contributions, and to lend out such sum or sums of money interest free" to "indigent and industrious manufacturers." The act said, "industrious tradesmen ... are often incapable of earning to themselves a livelihood for want of money to buy materials and other necessaries for carrying on their respective trades; whereby several of that useful class of men have perished, and their families reduced to beggary and become a burthen to the publick." The act also said borrowers had "been raised from poverty and despair to comparative comfort and confidence, and saved from being a charge on the Poor Rate or Mendicity Institution."

The loan funds were attractive to middle-class women depositors because of their charitable nature, and convenient for women living in small towns far from commercial banks. The Derry Sermon Charity, founded by the ladies of the Pery family, began to make small loans to the poor in the 1770s.

In 1839 the Letterkenny Loan Fund committee had seven women out of seventeen members. All the committee members were women in the O'Brien's Bridge Association for Bettering the Condition of the Poor in the Adjoining Districts of Tipperary, Limerick and Clare. A witness told the 1855 Select Committee on Loan Fund Societies that "an old lady smuggled in a sum of money which she said she did not wish her husband to know she possessed".

In the spring of 1822 many people in the west and south of Ireland suffered from famine caused by rain damage to the previous season's potato crop. The worst affected provinces were Connacht and western Munster. Many died when fever spread in June of that year. At this time tenant farmers were often burdened with rental arrears and there was a lack of work for the growing population. About a million people became dependent on government relief provided by a central committee in Dublin Castle and distributed through local committees. Public works such as roads, canals and harbours were started to provide jobs for the poor.

=== Growth and regulation (1823–1838) ===
A relief committee was formed in London in 1822, and raised £311,081 to assist the starving poor. From the residue, the committee appropriated £55,185 to be lent at interest to the industrious poor in the counties of Clare, Cork, Galway, Leitrim, Limerick, Mayo, Roscommon, Sligo and Tipperary. Trustees were appointed in each county, subject to the board of directors of the Irish Reproductive Loan Fund Institution in London. The trustees in turn lent money to local committees or associations. Some of the money was also spent to promote agricultural schools in the provinces of Munster and Connacht.

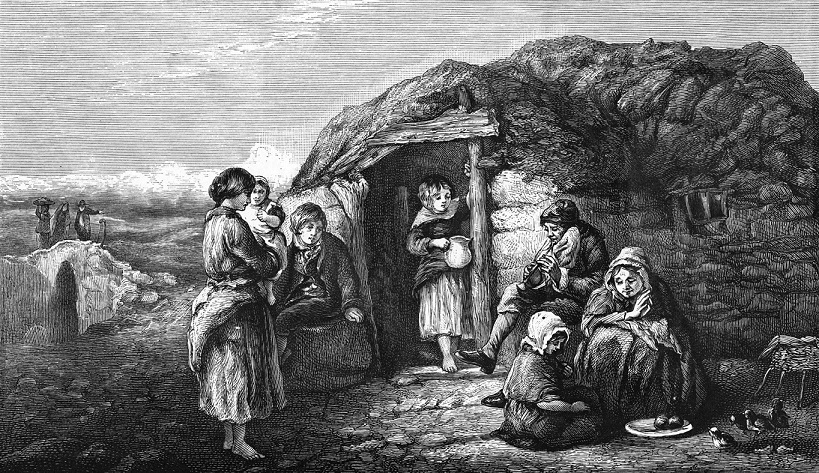
Irish Peasant Cabin c. 1840

Charitable Loan Societies (Ireland) Act 1823
- Act of Parliament
- Parliament of the United Kingdom
- Long title: An act for the Amendment of the Laws respecting Charitable Loan Societies in Ireland.
- Citation: 4 Geo. 4. c. 32
- Territorial extent: Ireland (Note: Preamble.)

Dates
- Royal assent: 30 May 1823
- Commencement: 30 May 1823 (Note: The Acts of Parliament (Commencement) Act 1793.)
- Repealed: 24 August 1843
Other legislation
Amended by	Charitable Loan Societies (Ireland) Act 1829; Loan Societies (Ireland) Act 1836; Loan Societies (Ireland) Act 1838
Repealed by	Loan Societies Act 1843

Status: Repealed

Text of statute as originally enacted

The Charitable Loan Societies (Ireland) Act 1823 (4 Geo. 4. c. 32) was passed to regulate the new loan fund societies and those already operating in Ireland.

- The fund managers could not receive payment in any form, although clerks could be paid.
- The funds could charge interest on their loans, so they would only be used by people who expected to earn a reasonable return.
- Other loan funds were started, some for profit and some charitable.
- These funds accepted interest-bearing deposits and lent out money.
- Sometimes they charged rates above the legal maximum and paid large salaries, in effect acting as poorly regulated banks.

Loan Societies (Ireland) Act 1836
- Act of Parliament
- Parliament of the United Kingdom
- Long title: An Act to amend the Laws relating to Loan Societies in Ireland.
- Citation: 6 & 7 Will. 4. c. 55
- Territorial extent: Ireland

Dates
- Royal assent: 13 August 1836
- Commencement: 13 August 1836
- Repealed: 24 August 1843
Other legislation
Amends	Charitable Loan Societies (Ireland) Act 1823
Repealed by	Loan Societies Act 1843

Status: Repealed

Text of statute as originally enacted

The 1823 act was superseded by the Loan Societies (Ireland) Act 1836 (6 & 7 Will. 4. c. 55), which established the Central Loan Fund Board of Ireland based in Dublin Castle.

Loan Societies (Ireland) Act 1838
- Act of Parliament
- Parliament of the United Kingdom
- Long title: An Act for the Amendment of the Laws relating to Loan Societies in Ireland.
- Citation: 1 & 2 Vict. c. 78
- Territorial extent: Ireland

Dates
- Royal assent: 10 August 1838
- Commencement: 10 August 1838
- Repealed: 24 August 1843
Other legislation
Amends	Charitable Loan Societies (Ireland) Act 1823; Charitable Loan Societies (Ireland) Act 1829
Repealed by	Loan Societies Act 1843

Status: Repealed

Text of statute as originally enacted

An amendment in the form of the Loan Societies (Ireland) Act 1838 (1 & 2 Vict. c. 78) required all loan funds, including funds independent of the main Irish Reproductive Loan Fund, to make an annual report to the Commissioners of the Central Loan Fund Board of Ireland, but the London-based Irish Reproductive Loan Funds were exempted from this requirement by a last minute change to the act. As well as the annual report to Dublin the funds were subject to ad hoc inspections by the board. The 1836 and 1838 acts were key to ensuring the longer-term success of the funds, and defined their long-term structure.

=== Peak period (1839–1843) ===
By 1839 there were many independent organizations managed by local clergy or gentry which employed clerks to administer the funds. The loans were less than £10 and were repayable in 20 weeks. There was no collateral but each loan had two guarantors and was required by law to be repaid. Often the guarantors, or sureties, were close relatives or neighbours. Surities could not co-sign more than one active loan, could not borrow themselves and were legally liable in case of default. Each borrower could only hold one loan of no more than £10 at any time. The funds were thus similar to banks but did not pay stamp duty, an important advantage given their many small loans. The loans were called reproductive loans because they were expected to be used in a way which would make money. Examples could be a loan for a fisherman to buy nets or to a farmer to buy seed or equipment. Borrowers included agricultural labourers, small-scale farmers, craftsmen and tradesmen. About 25% were women. The interest rate they paid was far below the rates for unsecured loans that would be charged by the "gombeen men", unscrupulous local moneylenders.

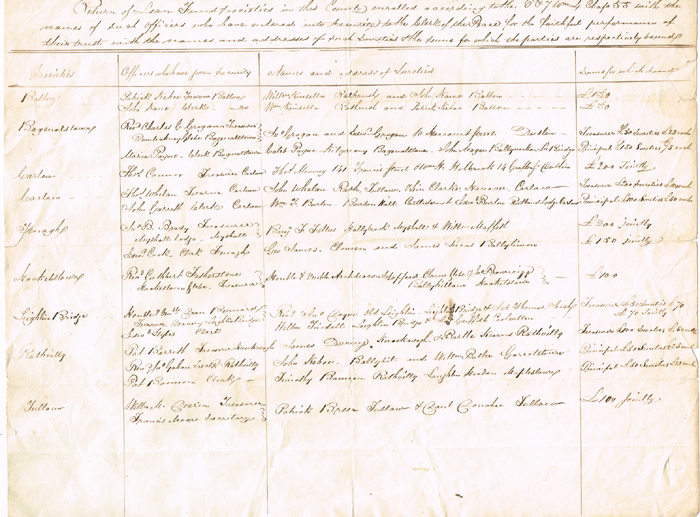
Financial return listing the names and addresses of officers of the eight loan fund societies in County Carlow, and amounts guaranteed by their sureties (1836)

Each fund had considerable freedom over the way it operated, within defined limits. The board, which could reduce salaries and wind up funds as needed, helped reduce fraud and increase depositor confidence. It also cut costs by defining standard operating procedures and a straightforward accounting system. Another advantage was that amounts from borrowers in default could be recovered by a warrant from a justice of the peace without the need to go through the courts. Surplus from the loan funds was used for charities such as schools or hospitals. Half the book profits from each year had to be given to a local charity, while the remainder could be retained as a capital base. Interest paid on deposits was limited to 6%.

Often the seed money came from a wealthy local benefactor. It was in their interests to help the poor support themselves, since otherwise they would have to support them in the workhouses established by the 1838 Irish Poor Law. Default rates were low in part because the managers and clerks were all local and understood the character and ability of the borrowers to repay. Another factor was the strong disapproval by the community of people who failed to repay a trusted local charity.

In the Poor Law Union of Skibbereen, with a total population of 104,508, 46,150 loans were made between 1839 and 1849. Most of these were small loans taken by poor people who could not otherwise borrow at an affordable rate. Inspectors were generally very enthusiastic about the value of the loans, both economic and moral.

An inspector wrote of Castletownshend:

"Farmers by a command of money at a reasonable rate of interest ... can purchase the best seed for the land. The fishermen living along the coast do not lose the chance of fish from want of boats and fishing gear, and the tradesmen are no longer idle from want of material to work with".

A report of Glandore concluded:

"… habits of industry and of exertion have ... been promoted, a regard for character and habits of punctuality have invariably been generated … we can see no evils that may not be prevented by strict, judicious, and impartial administration of the Fund"

The Loan Fund Board's 1841 report describes a borrower who

"holds a small mountain farm; got a loan, and laid out 4l. on flax, which enabled him to set his four girls at work, spinning; with their help, he paid the instalments, and was 4l. better at the end; bought a cow for that sum, which is now worth 4l.; has at present three cows, and says he is so well off that he may give up borrowing".

Another example is

"A.B., formerly a day labourer, and frequently assisted by a kind neighbour in the maintenance of his family, has, by means of the Loan Fund, raised himself to independence, and is now possessed of a cow, a pony, and a good cart, with a small patch of land, which he farms to good purpose..."

=== Slow decline (1843–1915) ===
The loan funds in Ireland by the early 1840s were very diverse in nature, and included private pawnbrokers and reorganised Mont-de-Piétés. By 1843 there were 300 loan funds operating in over half the baronies in Ireland. About 300,000 borrowers received almost 500,000 loans a year, with a standard term of 20 weeks. The mean amount of a loan was £3, and by law no loan could exceed £10. 30% to 40% of households were receiving loans in some counties. The depositors were wealthier than the borrowers, with a mean deposit of £46. In 1840, 44% of depositors held £50 or more.

Loan Societies Act 1843
- Act of Parliament
- Parliament of the United Kingdom
- Long title: An Act to continue to the First Day of August One thousand eight hundred and forty-four, and to the End of the then Session of Parliament, the Act to amend the Laws relating to Loan Societies.
- Citation: 6 & 7 Vict. c. 41

Dates
- Royal assent: 1 August 1843
- Commencement: 1 August 1843
- Repealed: 7 August 1874
Other legislation
Amends	Loan Societies Act 1840
Repealed by	Statute Law Revision Act 1874 (No. 2)

Status: Repealed

Text of statute as originally enacted

In 1843 the Charitable Loan Societies (Ireland) Act 1843 (6 & 7 Vict. c. 91) was passed, which consolidated enactments related to funds, reduced the maximum payable to depositors to 5%, and reduced the maximum annualised interest rate on loans from 13.6% to 8.8%, (Note: Section 28 of the act defines a rate of interest not exceeding 1.5 pennies per month upon each pound sterling (240 pennies)."Hollis & Sweetman give the rate set in 1843 as 8.8%, while Goodspeed gives it as 8%. (1.5/240)*12 gives 7.5%, but there were other charges.) thus drastically reducing margins.

Possibly the change was due to influence from the joint stock banks, for whom the funds had become strong competitors. The loan funds' capital fell and some of the loan societies closed. In County Cork there was a decline in societies from 36 in 1843 to 29 in 1844, with the societies of Skibbereen, Castletownshend, Ballydehob, Crookhaven and Skull all closed.

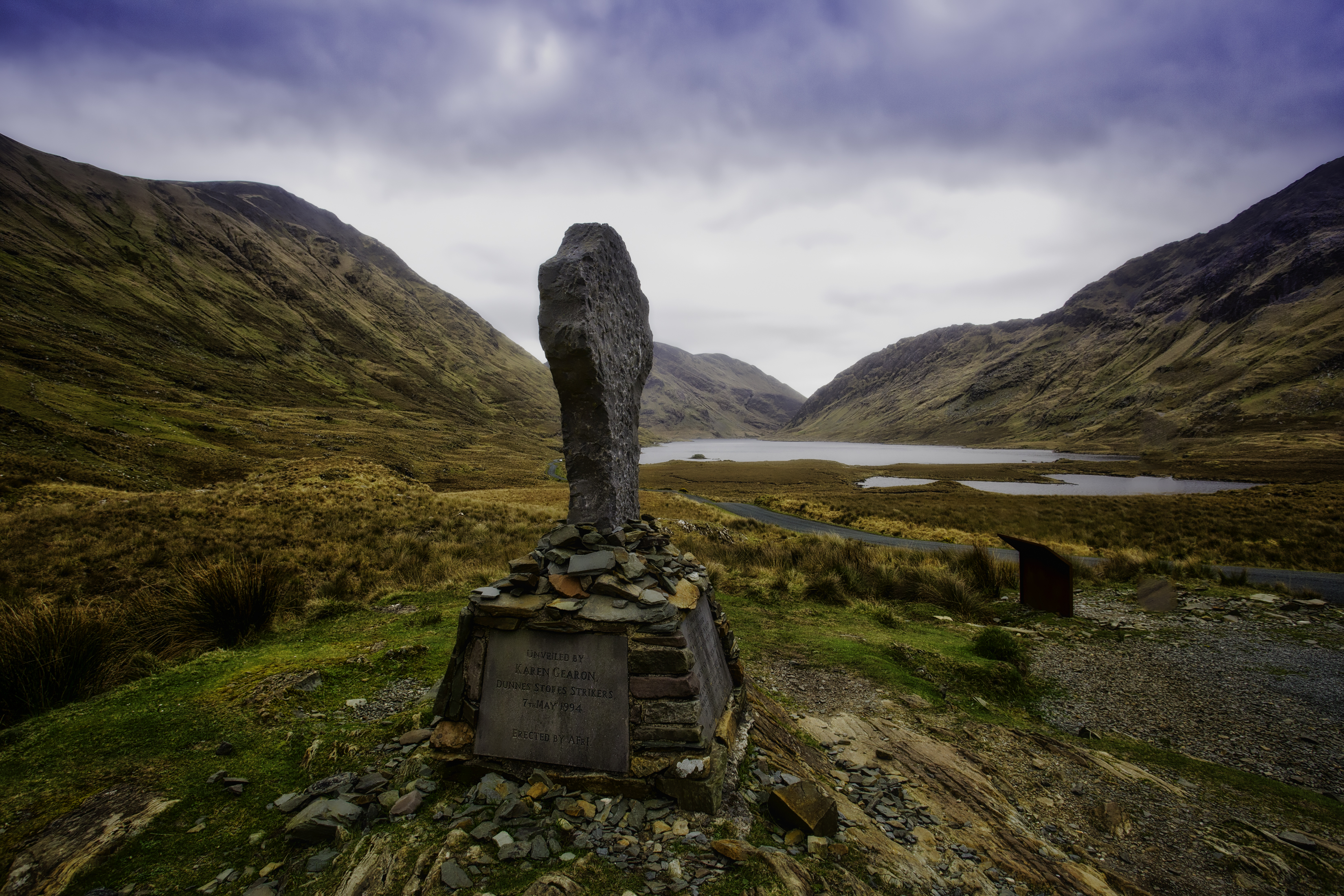
Famine Memorial, Doo Lough (Mayo)

When the Great Famine of 1845–1849 spread across Ireland many of the borrowers had to default on their loans, and more associations ran into difficulty. The famine also forced many of the depositors to withdraw money from the loan funds. The loan funds regulated by the Irish Loan Fund Board averaged loans of around £1,750,000 per year between 1843 and 1846. Even at the peak of the famine, the loan funds granted 459,360 loans worth £1,712,638 in 1846 and 223,465 loans worth £834,855 in 1847. An analysis of records for the Kilconickny Fund, which served the civil parishes of Kilconierin, Lickerrig and Kilconickny, noted that in the ten years up to 1851 the population had fallen by 38%, from 5,307 to 3,309. Of the defaulters, 29% died during the famine years and 28% were considered to be very poor. 22% had emigrated, mostly to the United States or England, but 14% were considered to be able to repay their debts.

By 1848 funds regulated by the Irish Loan Fund Board had dropped to £719,000, largely due to mortality and emigration caused by the famine. The London-based Reproductive Loan Fund Institution funds had not been supervised effectively, and declined steadily until 1848, when lending was suspended and what money remained was distributed to other charities. However, many associations survived the famine, and the loan fund structure remained essentially unchanged. By 1851 there were 123 surviving funds, 40% of the earlier peak, and the average total lent out had more than halved. However, the surviving funds recovered fairly quickly, although the industry never reached the same asset levels as before the famine, and then declined gradually over the long term.

From the 1860s the funds had to compete with post office savings banks. In 1874 the total loans were £523,000. The Board attributed recent declines partly to greater prosperity of the industrious agricultural poor, and thus lower demand for loans, and partly to the recent practice of branch banks in issuing loans as low as 10l. or even 5l. to small farmers and dealers. An 1875 account said "The loan has usually to be repaid in weekly instalments of one shilling per pound, and runs, therefore, for twenty weeks—interest at the rate of sixpence per pound being deducted from the original advance. The interest charged is thus equivalent to a discount of about 7 1/2 per cent per annum. From the 1890s the loan funds faced competition from rural credit cooperatives. In 1915 the Department of Agriculture took over the few remaining funds.

== Records ==
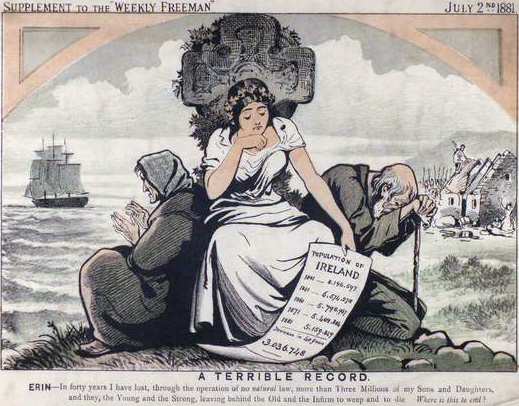
Lady Erin, Mother of Ireland, mourning the emigration of her young, mobile peoples

The records of the Reproductive Institution have been preserved almost intact by the Kew National Archives (ref T91) in the United Kingdom. The records created as the scheme was being wound down were scanned by a subsidiary of the National Archives. The records cover the local associations for counties Cork, Clare, Galway, Limerick, Mayo, Roscommon, Sligo and Tipperary. Associations for which records are held in the National Archives are:

- Cork: Baltimore, Castletown, Castletownshend, Cloyne, Creagh, Kilmoe and Crookhaven, Schull
- Galway: Ahascragh, Ballygar, Castle Hackett, Clifden, Kilconickny, Outerard, Galway
- Mayo: Ballina or Carramore, Ballindine, Ballinrobe, Castlebar, Claremorris, Kilmore, Swineford
- Roscommon: Aughnasurn, Ballinlough, Ballymoe, Clonfinlough, Elphin, Mosshill, Rockville, Tybohan
- Sligo: Templehouse
- Tipperary: Tipperary

The records, organised by county, association and townland, cover the period from 1821 to 1874, but most are for loans given in the years 1824 to 1846. They include security note books and loan ledgers, giving details of each loan, defaulters' books or lists of defaulters, and returns to the clerk of the peace. This last describes whether the borrower is still resident in the townland, and if so whether they are desperate, poor or comfortable, or where they moved or emigrated to, or their date of death. The loan and defaulter records give the amount, date, borrower and their address and occupation, and surities and their addresses and occupations, as well as principal and interest amounts due and paid. During this period millions of the Irish died of starvation or disease, or emigrated. The records have great value for people researching their family histories.

== Acts of Parliament ==
Year	Act	Citation	Purpose
1823	Charitable Loan Societies (Ireland) Act 1823	4 Geo. 4. c. 32	To regulate the Irish loan fund societies.
1836	Loan Societies (Ireland) Act 1836	6 & 7 Will. 4. c. 55	Amend the Laws Relating to Loan Societies in Ireland.
1838	Loan Societies (Ireland) Act 1838	1 & 2 Vict. c. 78	Make it compulsory for all loan funds to make an annual report to the Commissioners of the Central Loan Fund Board of Ireland.
1843	Loan Societies Act 1843	6 & 7 Vict. c. 41	An Act to consolidate and amend the Laws for the Regulation of Charitable Loan Societies in Ireland. The interest rate for deposits was reduced to 5% (Sec 9). The society could demand advance payment of interest up to four-pence in the pound for twenty weeks (Sec 27). The society could make loans at a rate of interest not exceeding one penny halfpenny per month upon each pound sterling (Sec 28).
1848	Irish Reproductive Loan Fund Act 1848	11 & 12 Vict. c. 115	An Act to vest in Her Majesty the Property of the Irish Reproductive Loan Fund Institution, and to dissolve the said Institution. [4 September 1848]. (Repealed by Statute Law Revision Act 1875 (38 & 39 Vict. c. 66))
1874	Irish Reproductive Loan Fund Act 1874	37 & 38 Vict. c. 86	All such property ... as may form part of the Irish Reproductive Loan Fund ... shall pass to and vest in the Commissioners of Public Works in Ireland."

== Bibliography ==
- Campbell, Gail; Lemire, Beverly; Pearson, Ruth (12 July 2020), Women and Credit: Researching the Past, Refiguring the Future, Taylor & Francis, ISBN 978-1-00-021096-5
- Chambers, Robert (1875), "The loan fund", Chambers's Information for the People, W. & R. Chambers
- Charitable Loan Societies (Ireland) Act, 1843, Government of Ireland
- Committee on Loan Fund Societies (Ireland) (30 April 1855), Reports from Committees, Great Britain. Parliament. House of Commons
- Goodspeed, Tyler Beck (20 January 2017), Famine and Finance: Credit and the Great Famine of Ireland, Springer, ISBN 978-3-319-31765-6
- Great Britain (1848), A Collection of the Public General Statutes Passed in the Eleventh and Twelfth Year of the Reign of Her Majesty Queen Victoria, Printed by G. W. Eyre and W. Spottiswoode, Printers to the Queen
- Hollis, Aidan; Sweetman, Arthur (2 January 1996), The Evolution of a Microcredit Institution: The Irish Loan Funds, 1720 - 1920 (PDF), University of Toronto, ISSN 0829-4909
- Ireland, Sustainability Loan Fund, 1812-1868, Ancestry
- "Ireland, Poverty Relief Loans 1821-1874", Find my Past
- "Irish Reproductive Loan Fund, 1821-1874", Family Search c
- Irish Reproductive Loan Fund Act, 1874, Government of Ireland
- Johnston, Nigel, Historical commentary for 1822 (PDF), National Archives, Ireland
- Kearney, Terri (May 2017), An Analysis of the Loan Funds in the Skibbereen Poor Law Union 1839-49 (PDF), Skibbereen Heritage Centre
- McKee, Mary (2 November 2015), "Fascinating new resource for Irish family history", Irish Central, Irish Studio LLC
- Parliament (1876), "The Irish Loan Fund Board", The British Almanac, Stationers' Company
- Skibb Girl, Irish Reproductive Loan Fund Records for County Cork, archived from the original on 27 August 2017
- The Reproductive Loan Fund in Kilconierin Parish, Ireland Reaching Out
