= Sean Cunningham =

Sean Cunningham may refer to:

- Seán Cunningham (1918–1997), Irish Republican and co-operative activist
- Sean S. Cunningham (born 1941), American film director, producer, and writer
- Sean Cunningham (RAF officer) (1976–2011), Red Arrows pilot who died when his ejector seat deployed accidentally while his aircraft was still on the ground
- Sean Cunningham (musician) (born 1985), American musician and singer-songwriter
- Sean Cunningham (basketball) (born 1986), American-Dutch basketball player
- Sean Cunningham (soccer) (born 1993), American soccer player
