= Clostoken =

- Townland
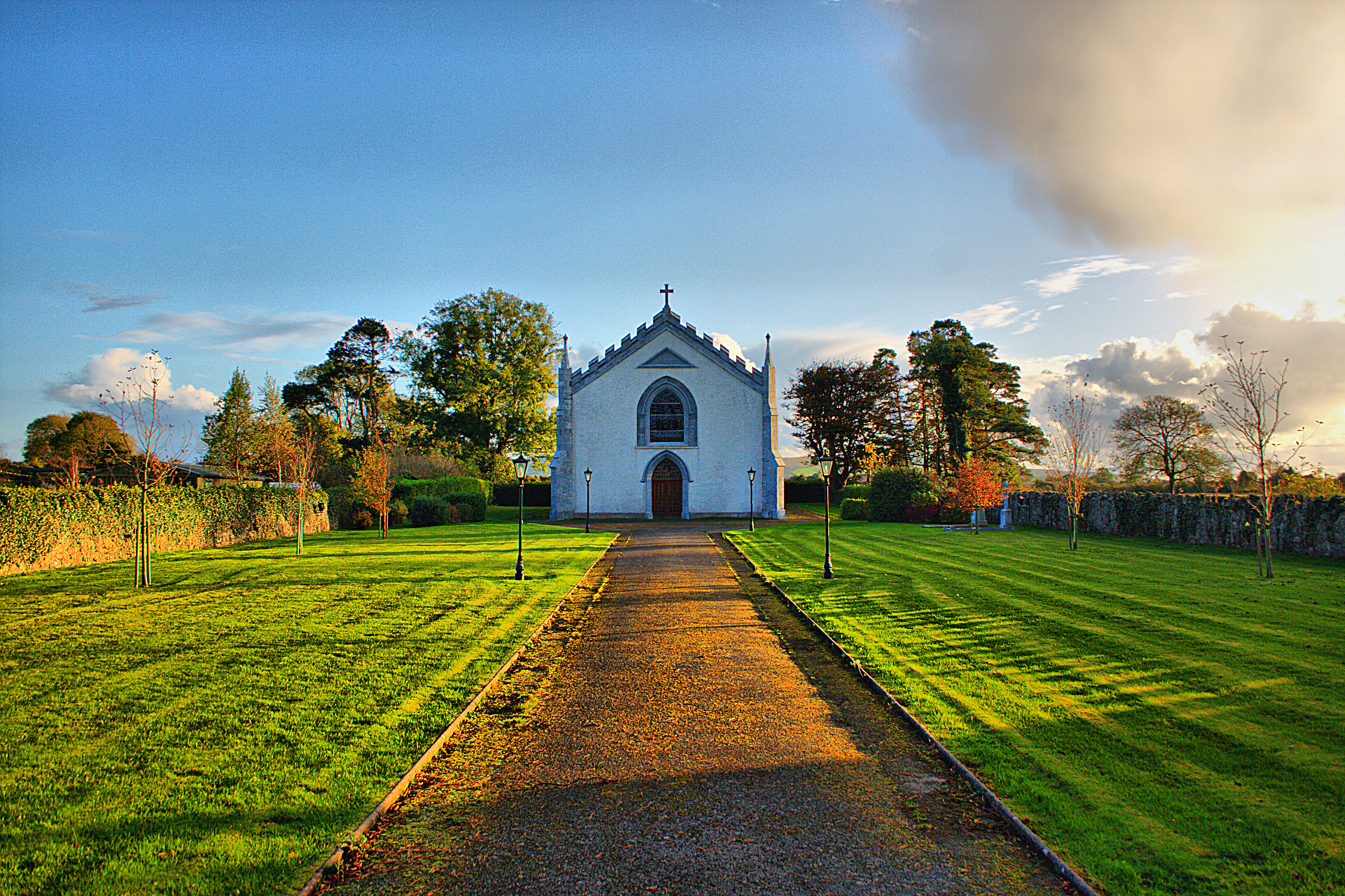
- Church of the Holy Family, Clostoken parish

- Location within Ireland
- Coordinates: 53.218317°N 8.62504°W
- Country: Ireland
- Province: Connaught
- County: Galway
- Civil Parish: Kilconickny

Clostoken or Cloghastookeen is a small townland in the civil parish of Kilconickny, near the town of Loughrea in County Galway, Ireland. It takes its name from an old ruined castle. Today, the name is more commonly used to refer to the civil parish of Kilconickny.

== Name ==
According to O'Donovan's Field Name Books (1862), the Irish language form of the name is Cloch stúincín, meaning "stone of the little prominence". Other forms include Clostoken, Closetaken, Cloghstockin, Cloghastockin, Cloghstokin, Cloghastookeen and Clostaken. Joyce (1910) writes "Near Loughrea in Galway, is a townland called Cloghastookeen, the stone fortress of the little pinnacle, which received its name from a castle of the Burkes, the ruins of which still remain. The townland gives its name to Clostoken & Kilconieran parish. There were three ecclesiastical parishes in the Middle Ages; Kilconickny (now Clostoken), Kilconieran and Lickerrig (now Carrabane). The three are now united in the large parish of Clostoken & Kilconieran.

== Location ==
Cloghastookeen is in the Electoral Division of Kilconickny. Bordering townlands are Carrowclogh to the south, Kilmurry to the east, Knockadaumore to the east, Saintclerans to the north and Srah to the west. The area of the townland is 142.12 acres (57.51 ha). O'Donovan writes; "This is a small townland, all arable and used as pasture land. It contains no antiquities, nor anything remarkable. It does have extensive ruins of a castle." This is Cloastoken Old Castle.

== People ==
The 1826 Tithe Appointment Books list 10 households in Cloghastookeen townland: Coniff, Glenane, Glenane, Glenane, Kelly, Kelly, O'Bryen, O'Laughlin, Walsh and Walsh. The Miller family of Cromwellian settlers inherited part of the Cloghastookeen estate through marriage with a Croasdaile heiress. In 1855 Croasdaile Bowen Miller was one of the principal lessors in the parish of Kilconickny. Griffith's Valuation, published between 1847 and 1864, gives the area of the townland as 169 acres (68 ha). The land value at that time was £.100-14s.-2d. Four households were listed: Darcy, Walsh, Walsh and Miller. In the 1911 census there was just one household in the townland, Sherry, with 10 people aged 5 to 65.

== Sources ==
- "Cloch an Stuaicín", logainm.ie
- "Cloghastookeen Townland, Co. Galway", townlands-ie
- Clostoken & Kilconieran, Roman Catholic Diocese of Clonfert
- Information about Cloghastookeen, Galway Public Library
- Joyce, Patrick Weston (1910), The origin and history of Irish names of places, London: Longmans, Green & Co.
- Ormsby (Ballinamore), NUI Galway
- People who lived in Cloghastookeen townland up to 1911, Galway Public Library
- Residents of a house 1 in Cloghastookeen (Kilconickny, Galway), National Archives of Ireland
