= Dunsandle railway station =

Former railway station in Ireland

Dunsandle
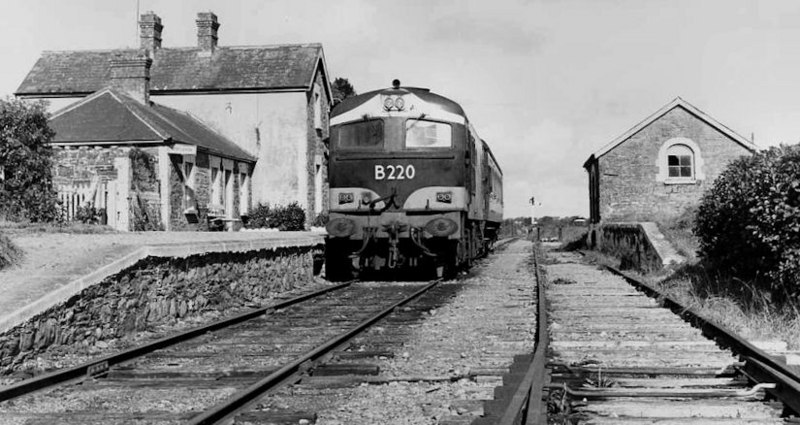
- Dunsandle railway station in 1975 before closure

General information
- Location: Killtullagh, County Galway; Ireland
- Coordinates: 53.26615°N 8.60452°W
- Distance: 4 miles 6 chains (6.6 km)

History
- Opened: 1890
- Closed: 1963
- Original company: Loughrea & Attymon Light Railway
- Pre-grouping: Midland Great Western Railway
- Post-grouping: Great Southern Railways

Services
Preceding station	Disused railways	Following station
Attymon halt	Midland Great Western Railway; Loughrea & Attymon Railway	Loughrea
Location

Dunsandle railway station opened in 1890 as the only intermediate station on the Loughrea & Attymon branch line. It closed on 3 November 1975. The station and its surrounds and associated rolling stock are now privately owned.
