= Garrafrauns =

Garrafrauns Na Garfráin
- Village
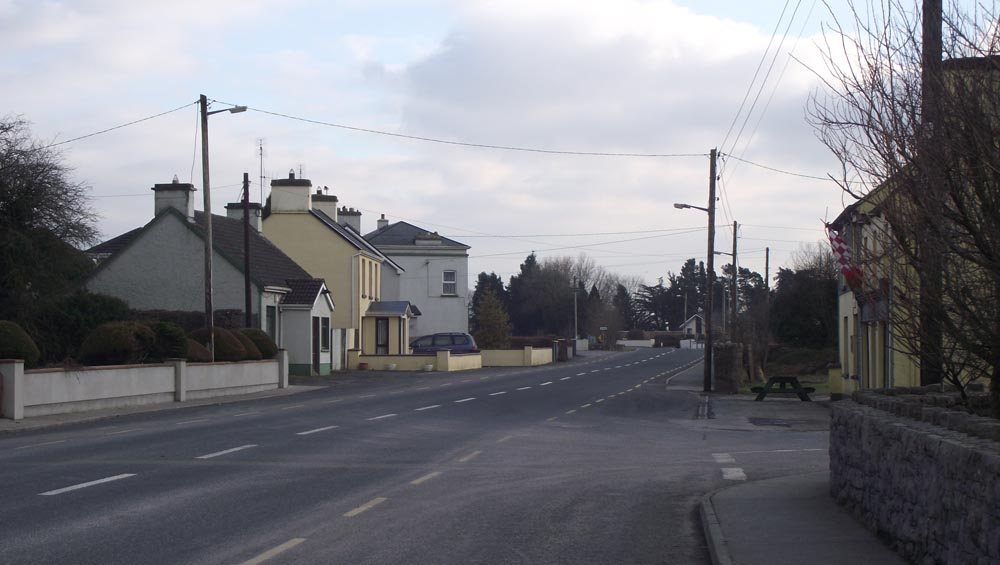
- Garrafrauns village, along R328 road

- Location in Ireland
- Coordinates: 53°38′01″N 8°49′30″W
- Country: Ireland
- Province: Connacht
- County: County Galway

Government
  - Dáil Éireann: Galway East
  - EU Parliament: Midlands–North-West
- Time zone: UTC+0 (WET)
  - Summer (DST): UTC-1 (IST (WEST))
- Area code: +353 93
- Irish Grid Reference: M451652
- Website: garrafrauns.com

Garrafrauns (Irish: Na Garfráin) is a village and 202 acre townland in north County Galway, Ireland. The name Garrafrauns is derived from either Garra bhfearán (garden of the wild brambles) or Garbhthráin (rough grassy place). The village consists of a church, school, garage and a multiple-use community centre. Garrafrauns is four miles from Dunmore along the R328 road. Other neighbouring towns and villages are Cloonfad (5 miles), Irishtown (3 miles), Milltown (5 miles), and Tuam (9 miles).

== St. Patrick's Church ==
A sandstone, cruciform, gothic design church with a thatched roof and whitewashed interior was built in Garrafrauns village in 1820. A replacement church situated across the road from this original, was completed in 1913 and consecrated by Archbishop Gilmartin of Tuam. The bell tower has since been removed. Garrafrauns lies in the middle of a half parish of Dunmore, and the parish comprises 16 townlands.

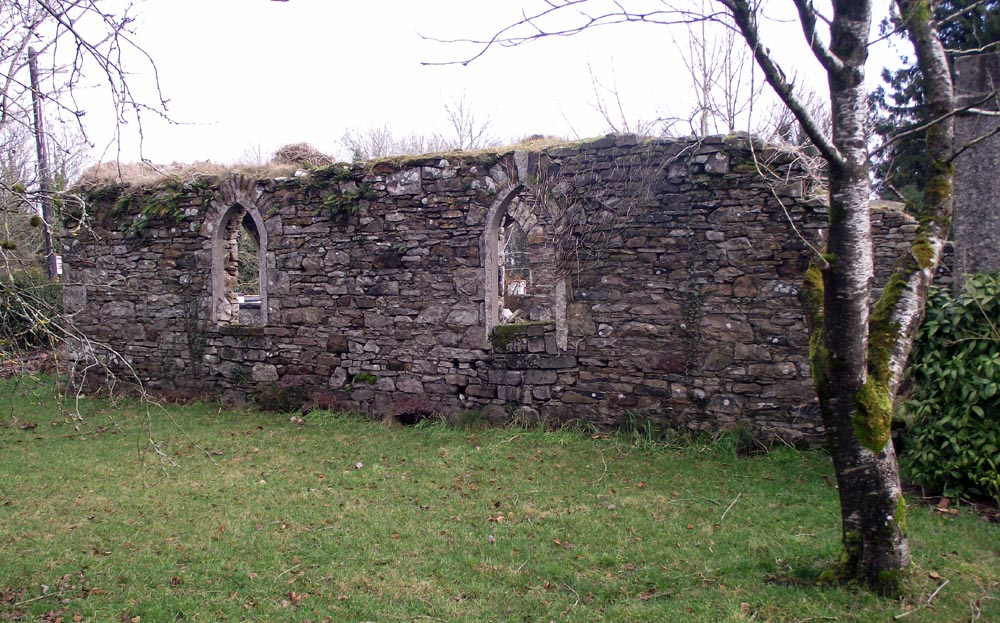
Exterior view of old church

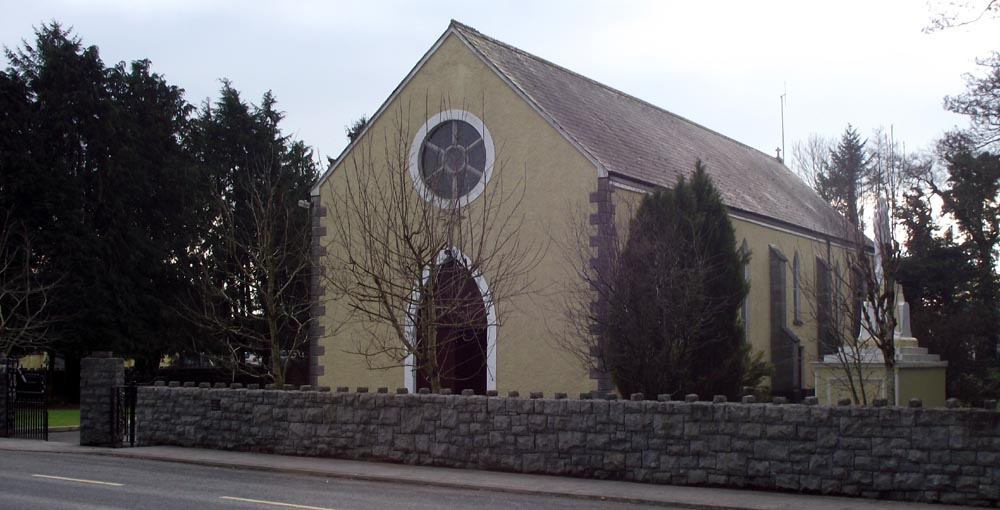
Exterior view of St. Patrick's Church

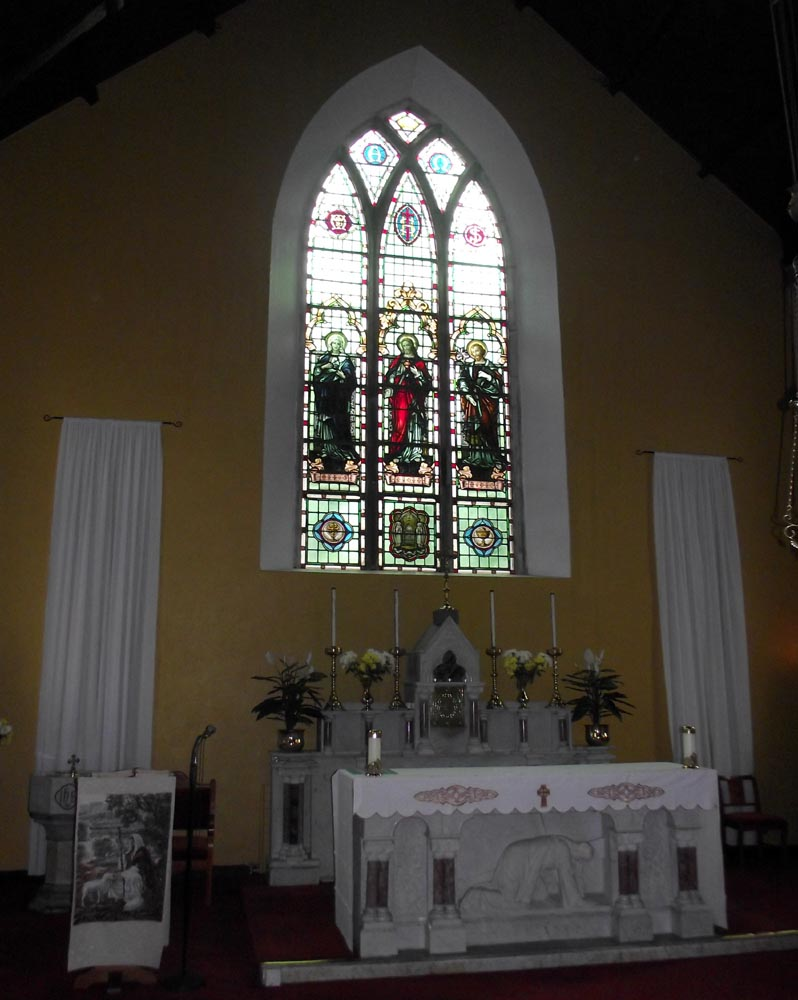
Altar and window

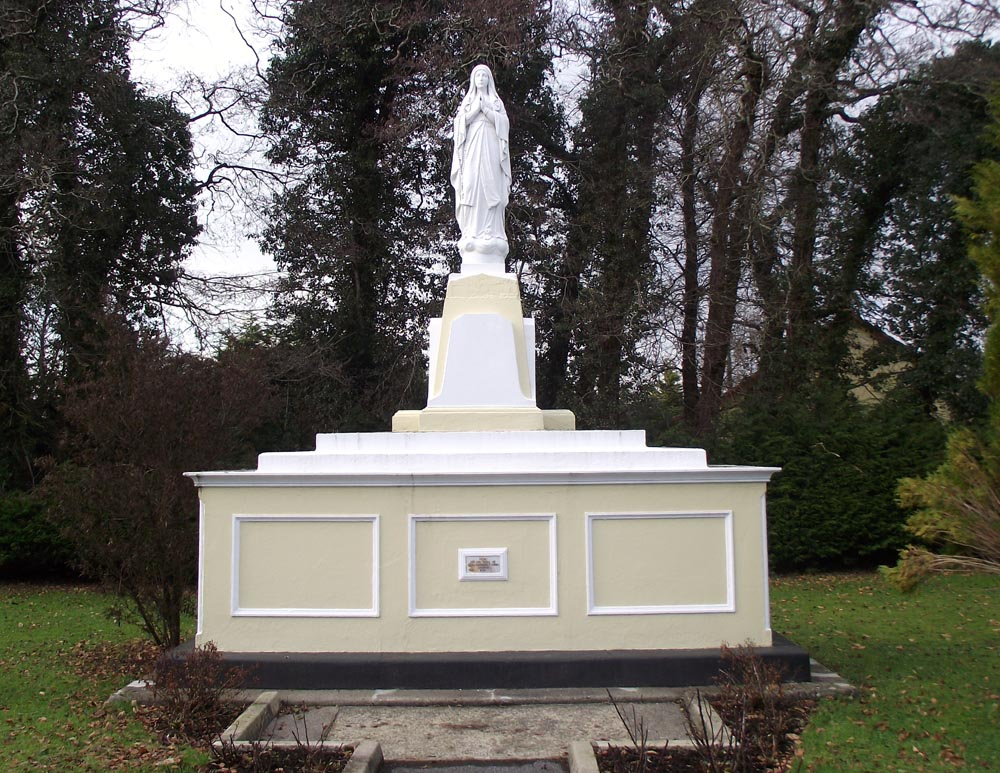
Statue in grounds

== Garrafrauns National School ==
Garrafrauns National School was opened in 1975, with the school increased in size in 1985 with amalgamation with nearby Strawberry Hill National School. Originally built as a three-room school, it has now been extended and has a large mixed use play area to the front. The school has developed a vegetable garden for which the pupils are responsible. The school participates in the Green School Project, which is intended to raise awareness of environmental issues.

== Local heritage ==
Heverin's Mill is a thatched mill which was built in 1842. The single movement mill wheel measured 11 feet in diameter and 2 feet 8 inches wide. Corn for milling was dried in two kilns, made from stones covered by straw, heated by a turf fire.

Garrafrauns Heritage Group was formed in 2003 and produced a book, entitled '"Garrafrauns Through the Ages"' outlining the history of the area in 2010.
