= Loughrea (barony) =

Barony in County Galway, Ireland

Loughrea Baile Locha Riach (Irish)
- Barony
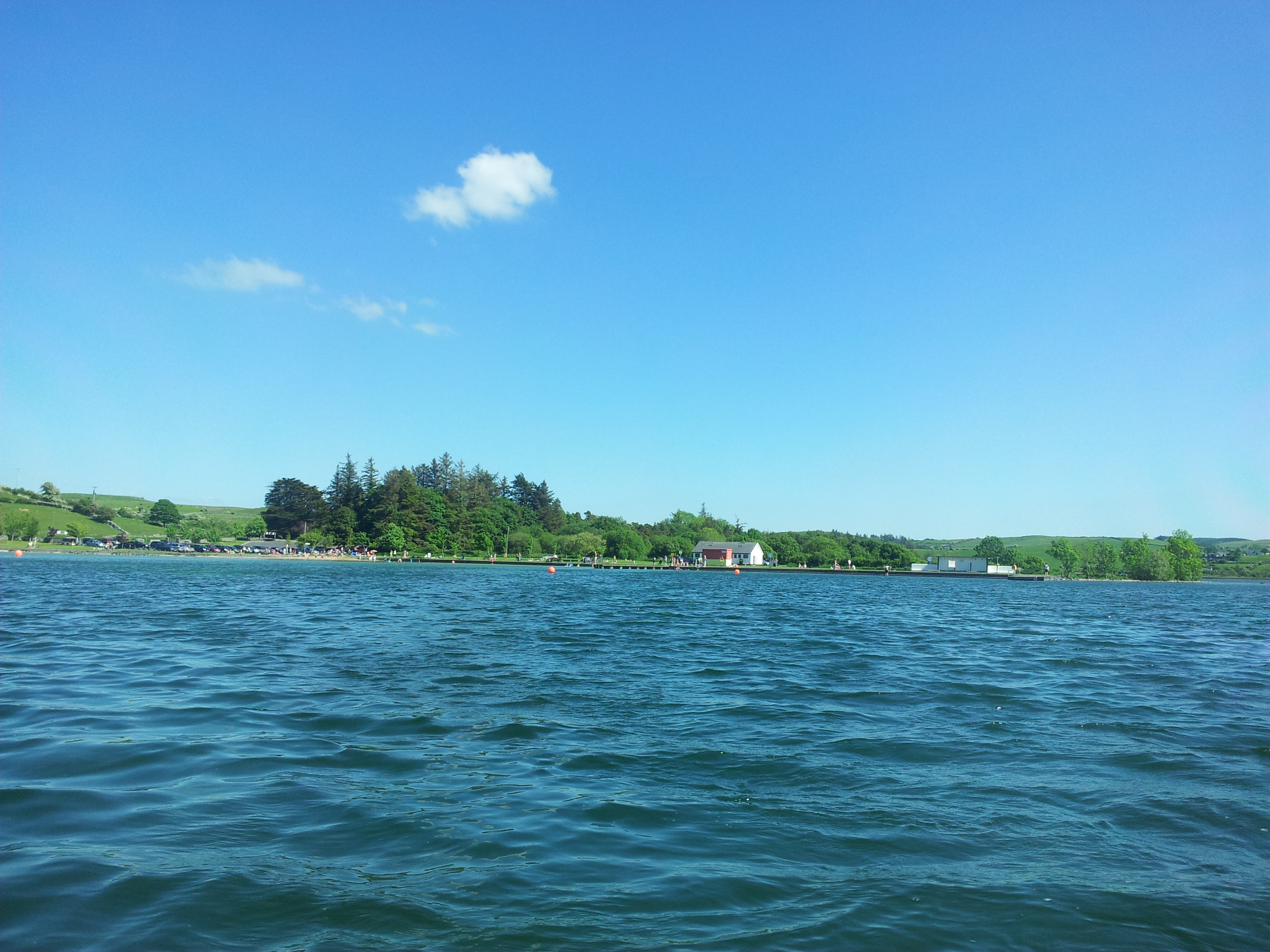
- Lough Rea

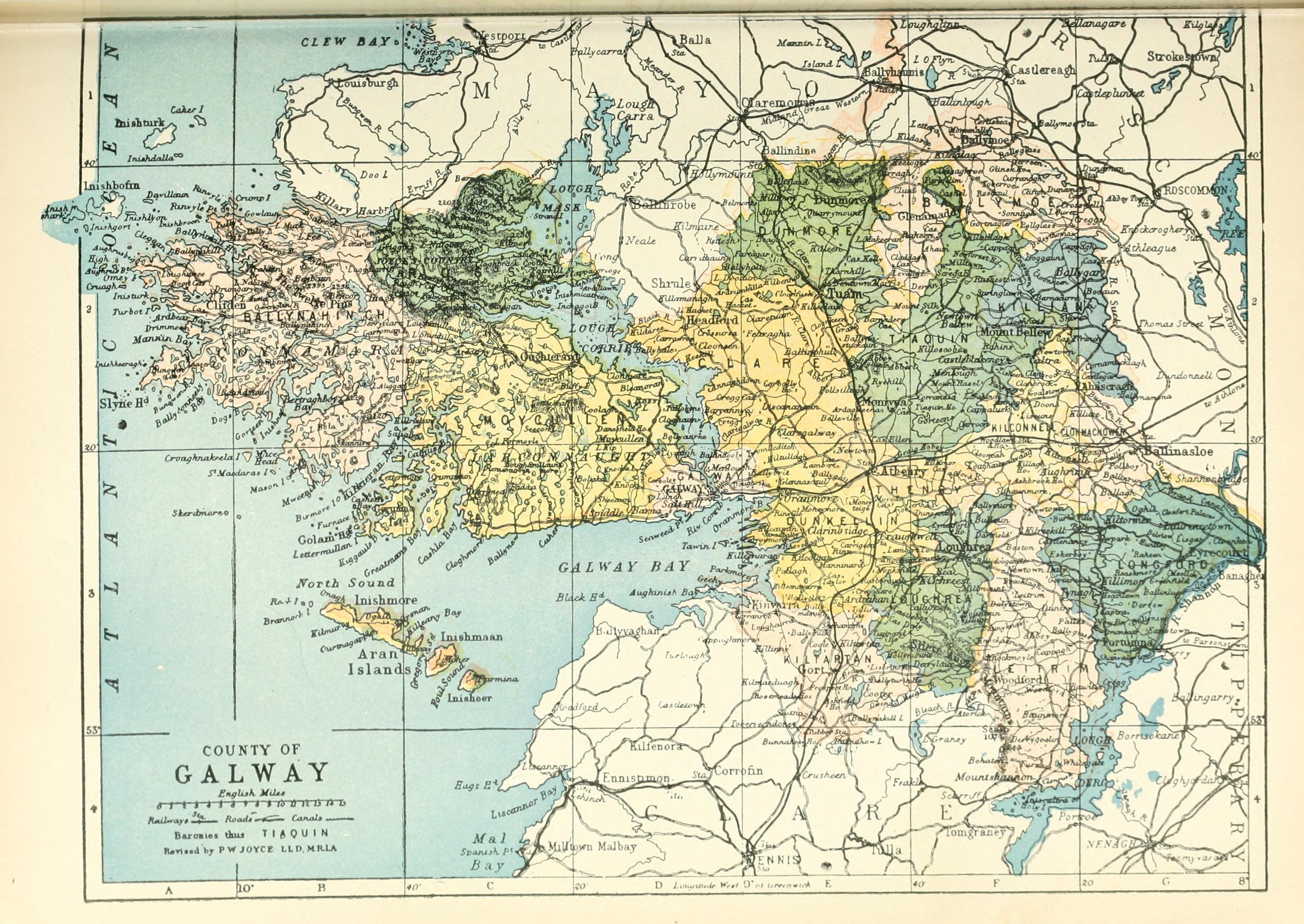
- Barony map of County Galway, 1900; Loughrea is in the south, coloured light green.

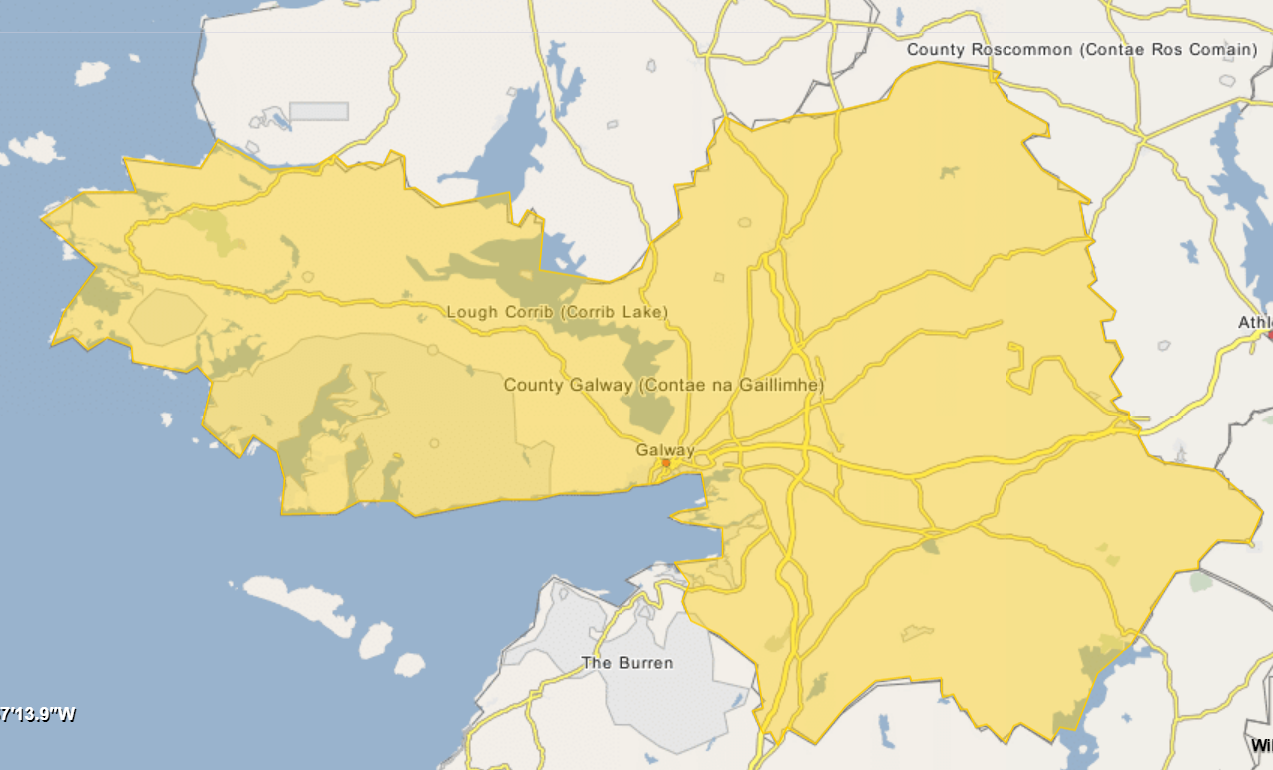
- Location within County Galway
- Coordinates: 53°10′N 8°38′W
- Sovereign state: Ireland
- Province: Connacht
- County: Galway

Area
  - Total: 260.6 km^{2} (100.6 sq mi)

Loughrea (Irish: Baile Locha Riach, occasionally spelled Loughreagh) is a historical barony in northern County Galway, Ireland.

Baronies were mainly cadastral rather than administrative units. They acquired modest local taxation and spending functions in the 19th century before being superseded by the Local Government (Ireland) Act 1898.

== History ==
Loughrea barony, along with Leitrim barony, formed the kingdom of Máenmag (Maenmoy), ruled by the O'Naughton and O'Mullaly until the 13th century. Part of Loughrea barony was ruled by Uí Fiachrach Aidhne.

Loughrea barony was created before 1574.

== Geography ==
Loughrea barony is in southern County Galway, running from Loughrea town and its lake south to the Slieve Aughty Mountains. The toponym 'Loughrea' is from Irish meaning "speckled lake."

== List of settlements ==
Settlements within the historical barony of Loughrea include:

- Ardrahan
- Derrybrien
- Killeenadeema
- Loughrea
