= P. J. Kelly =

Irish politician and sportsman

P. J. Kelly (Fenian) 1847 – 18 April 1908.

Kelly was one of six children, was born in kilchreest and raised in Grange Park, Killeenadeema, Loughrea. His mother, Bridget Taylor of Kilchreest, was a member of the Church of Ireland. All of his brothers emigrated to Australia. He married Sabina Conway and had seven sons and two daughters. His sons Larry, John and Joe later joined the I.R.A.

He was jailed several times for Fenian and Irish Republican Brotherhood activities, in prisons such as Ballykinlough. He was instrumental in the founding of the G.A.A. He and several other Galway men asked Bishop Patrick Duggan to be the patron of the nascent G.A.A. He declined the offer but suggested they approach Archbishop Thomas Croke of Cashel instead. Kelly was present in Hayes Hotel in Thurles the night the G.A.A. was founded.

He went on to become the 3rd President of the G.A.A. and is the only full-time farmer to have held the post In addition, Kelly was Honorary Secretary of the Galway GAA and Chairman of the Loughrea District Council.
