= Seán Cunningham =

Irish cooperative activist and Republican (1918–1997)

Seán Cunningham (1918–1997) was an Irish cooperative activist and Republican.

Cunningham was born in Grousehill House, Killeenadeema, Loughrea, the eldest of six children born to Mary-Anne Hynes and Paddy Cunningham. He was a carpenter working in the Loughrea area before moving to Dublin, where he got involved in the Irish Cooperative Movement. He aided the creation of the Borrisokane Co-Op in the 1950s, was associated with Nenagh Co-Op and helped establish its permanent branch in Killimor. He also aided the creation of stations at Ballyshrule, Gort and New Inn. In Loughrea he helped establish the Cooperative Livestock Mart, serving as chairman and a committee member till his death.

Cunningham's other passion was politics. His daughter, Veronica, wrote that:

he was a committed Republican. We had many arguments about politics especially in my teens as I generally took completely the opposite political point of view to him. He contested the Galway County Council Election three times as a Sinn Féin candidate in 1967 and twice in the 1970s. I remember him making speeches at the time outside the church and after Mass on a Sunday.

Cunningham died on 24 May 1997. His coffin was carried to St. Dympna's Church, Kileenadeema, by members of Republican Sinn Féin, led by Ruairí Ó Brádaigh.
