= Charitable Loan Societies (Ireland) Act 1843 =

Act of the Parliament of the United Kingdom

Charitable Loan Societies (Ireland) Act 1843 (Note: The citation of this act by this short title was authorised by section 1 of, and the first schedule to, the Short Titles Act 1896. Due to the repeal of those provisions it is now authorised by section 19(2) of the Interpretation Act 1978.)
- Act of Parliament
- Parliament of the United Kingdom
- Long title: An Act to consolidate and amend the Laws for the Regulation of Charitable Loan Societies in Ireland.
- Citation: 6 & 7 Vict. c. 91
- Territorial extent: United Kingdom

Dates
- Royal assent: 24 August 1843
- Commencement: 24 August 1843 (Note: The Acts of Parliament (Commencement) Act 1793.)
- Repealed: 29 November 1955
Other legislation
Repeals/revokes	See § Repealed enactments
Amended by	Charitable Loan Societies (Ireland) Act 1844
Repealed by	Finance (Miscellaneous Provisions) Act (Northern Ireland) 1955
Relates to	Loan Societies Act 1843

Status: Repealed

Text of statute as originally enacted

The Charitable Loan Societies (Ireland) Act 1843 (6 & 7 Vict. c. 91) was an act of the Parliament of the United Kingdom that consolidated enactments related to charitable loan societies in Ireland.

== Provisions ==
=== Repealed enactments ===
Section 1 of the act repealed 4 enactments, listed in that section. The repeal did not affect the operation of any of the repealed acts in so far as they repealed a former act or acts, or affect anything already done under them; and, as respects societies already established and duly certified under the repealed acts, such parts of those acts as were in force immediately before the passing of the act remained in force until 31 December 1843, unless the rules of the society concerned were certified under the act before that date.

Citation	Short title	Description	Extent of repeal
4 Geo. 4. c. 32	Charitable Loan Societies (Ireland) Act 1823	An Act for the Amendment of the Laws respecting Charitable Loan Societies in Ireland.	The whole act.
10 Geo. 4. c. 42	Charitable Loan Societies (Ireland) Act 1829	An Act to amend an Act of the Fourth Year of His present Majesty, for the Amendment of the Laws respecting Charitable Loan Societies in Ireland.	The whole act.
6 & 7 Will. 4. c. 55	Loan Societies (Ireland) Act 1836	An Act to amend the Laws relating to Loan Societies in Ireland.	The whole act.
1 & 2 Vict. c. 78	Loan Societies (Ireland) Act 1838	An Act for the Amendment of the Laws relating to Loan Societies in Ireland.	The whole act.

== Subsequent developments ==
The act was amended by the Charitable Loan Societies (Ireland) Act 1844 (7 & 8 Vict. c. 38), which extended the summary recovery of loans before a justice of the peace to notes and securities taken by a society before its rules were certified, and extended the act's provisions relating to the London charitable association known as the Irish Reproductive Loan Fund Institution to that body following its incorporation by royal charter.

The whole act was repealed for Northern Ireland by section 27 of, and the fourth schedule to, the Finance (Miscellaneous Provisions) Act (Northern Ireland) 1955 (1955 c. 19 (N.I.)), which came into force on 29 November 1955.
