= Ballindine railway station =

Former railway station in Ballindine, Ireland

General information
- Location: Ballindine, County Mayo; Ireland
- Coordinates: 53.6685°N 8.959°W
- Operator: Waterford, Limerick and Western Railway
- Line: Limerick–Claremorris
- Platforms: 1
- Tracks: 1

History
- Opened: 1894
- Closed: 1963
Location

Ballindine railway station is a disused railway station close to the village of Ballindine in County Mayo, Ireland. The station was originally opened by the Waterford, Limerick and Western Railway in 1894 on the route between Limerick and Claremorris. The station was completely closed in 1963.

As part of the government's Transport 21 plan, it was suggested that Ballindine Station would be re-opened in 2014 under the third stage of the Western Railway Corridor restoration. However, this project was deferred indefinitely.
