= R328 road (Ireland) =

Road in Ireland

R328 road
- Bóthar R328
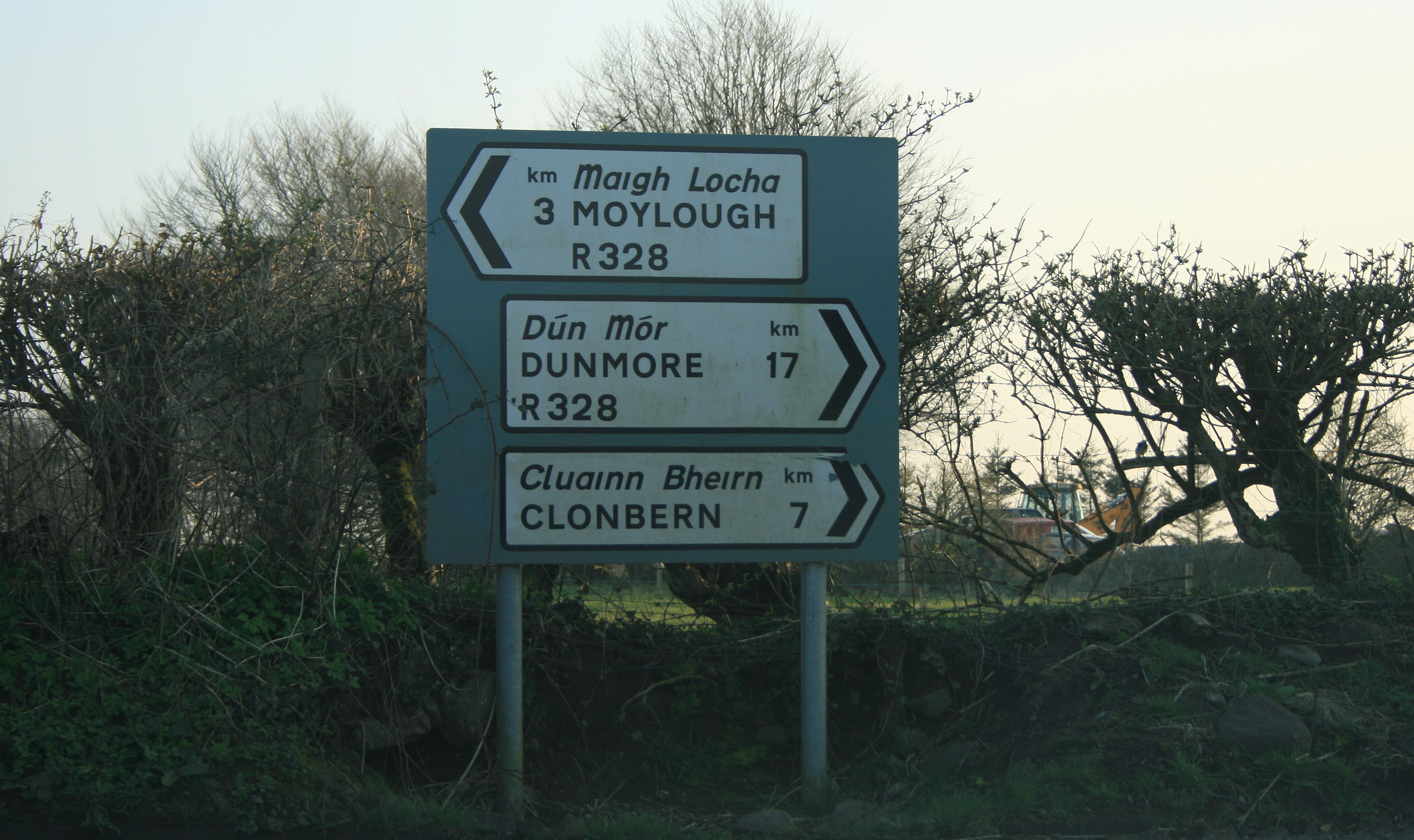
- Signage on the R328 in County Galway

Route information
- Length: 36 km (22 mi)

Location
- Country: Ireland
- Primary destinations: (Ballindine to Moylough): County Mayo; Ballindine (N17); Irishtown; Doonmacreena Bridge; Crosses Dalgan River; County Galway; Garrafrauns; Crosses Sinking River; Dunmore; Lissybroder; Kippaunagh; Clonbern; Ballyedmond; Mountsilk; Moylough (N63)

Highway system
- Roads in Ireland; Motorways; Primary; Secondary; Regional

The R328 road is a regional road in Counties Mayo and Galway in Ireland, connecting Ballindine on the N17 to Moylough on the N63.

The official definition of the R328 from the Roads Act 1993 (Classification of Regional Roads) Order 2006 states:

R328: Ballindine, County Mayo - Moylough, County Galway

Between its junction with N17 at Ballindine East in the county of Mayo and its junction with N63 at Moylough in the county of Galway via Irishtown in the county of Mayo: Doonmacreena Bridge at the boundary between the county of Mayo and the county of Galway: Garrafrauns; Castle Street and Barrack Street at Dunmore; Kippaunagh, Ballyedmond and Mountsilk in the county of Galway.

== See also ==
- Roads in Ireland
- National primary road
- National secondary road
- Regional road
