= Loughrea railway station =

Former railway station in Ireland

Loughrea
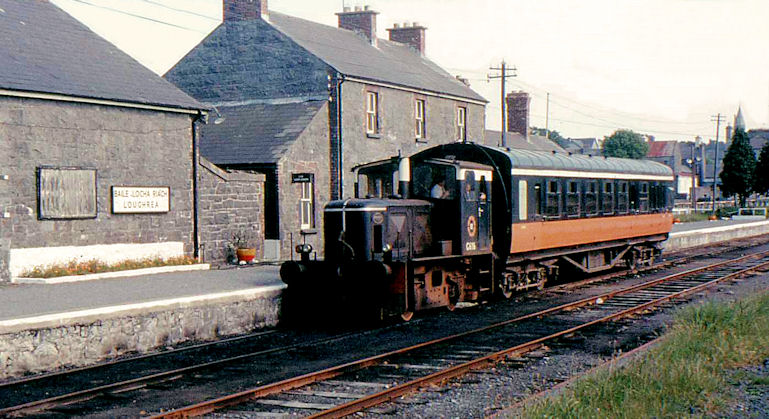
- Loughrea railway station in 1975 before closure

General information
- Location: Loughrea, County Galway; Loughrea, County Galway; Ireland
- Coordinates: 53.201°N 8.567°W
- Distance: 8 miles 75 chains (14.4 km)

History
- Opened: 1890
- Closed: November 1975
- Original company: Loughrea & Attymon Light Railway
- Pre-grouping: Midland Great Western Railway
- Post-grouping: Great Southern Railways

Services
Preceding station	Disused railways	Following station
Dunsandle	Midland Great Western Railway; Loughrea & Attymon Railway	Terminus
Location

Lougrea railway station served Loughrea, a village in County Galway, Ireland. It opened in 1890 as the terminus of the Loughrea & Attymon branch line, and closed on 3 November 1975.

As of 2018, the station building was in a run-down state and has been closed to the general public for safety precautions. The former water tower has been preserved, incorporated into the new industrial unit adjacent to the former station.

The Model Railway Society of Ireland constructed a working OO gauge model of Loughrea railway station and surrounds.
