= Edmond MacHugo =

Edmond MacHugo (alias MacCoug, MacCook, Cook), Irish Chief of the Name, alive 1559.

MacHugo is notable as one of the first certain bearers of the surname MacHugo, and the only attested Chief of the Name. The family being a sept of the Burke family of Clanricarde, County Galway. The family took their name from a Hugh or Hugo Burke, alive sometime in the late 14th century.

Edmond was listed as "Chief of his Nation" in a Fiant dated 1570, and resided at Killeenadeema castle, now destroyed. His son Geoffrey MacHugo (Sheron MacCoug of Killyndyma, fl. 1570 - 6 October 1605) had issue Ulick, James, Edmond Reagh and William, from whom are descended many bearers of the name MacHugo. Some bearers of the name are buried in the ruined Carmelite abbey of Loughrea.
