= William Malachy Burke =

Irish physician (1819–1879)

William Malachy Burke (4 August 1819 – 13 August 1879) was an Irish physician and Registrar General.

== Biography ==
Burke was born at Ballydugan, near Loughrea, County Galway, the third son of William Malachy Burke (1784–1853), a Barrister-at-law, High Sheriff of Co. Galway 1822, and Anna Maria, only daughter of John Blake of Windfield. Both the Blakes and the Burkes were old Galway families, the Burkes descending from Richard Mór de Burgh, 1st Baron of Connaught (died 1242) and the Blakes being one of the Tribes of Galway.

After receiving his medical education at St George's Hospital, London, in 1842, Burke passed MRCS at the London College of Surgeons. He became a Licenciate (LKQCP) in Ireland in June 1847, and on 19 October 1863, a Fellow of the King's and Queen's College of Physicians in Ireland. He served as a physician at Steevens' Hospital, Dublin, and he was also Physician in Ordinary to the Lord Lieutenant of Ireland, for the years 1866–68 and 1874–76.

Burke was a member of the Pathology Society and the Geological Society, Dublin; of the British Medical Association; a Fellow of the British Meteorological Society; and was a Visiting Physician to Steevens' Hospital, Dublin. He also served as a Consultant Physician at the National Eye and Ear Infirmary, St Stephen's Green.

After serving as Medical Superintendent in the General Register Office from 1864 to 1876, he succeeded Mr Donnelly as Registrar General for Ireland, serving from 1876 to 1879, during which period he effected important improvements in the system of registration in Ireland.

He married in 1852 Harriet Isabella, only surviving daughter of the Rev. Hugh Hamilton, of Churchhill, Benmore, County Fermanagh. They had three children; William Henry Marsh, Capt. (b. 9 April 1859, d. 1892), John Albert (b. 1862), Edmund (b. 1865). He died on 13 August 1879 from pleuro-pneumonia, at his residence at 88 St Stephen's Green. He was interred in Mount Jerome Cemetery. Burke was considered to be "a very amiable man and was much liked in the large social circle in which he moved".
