= Ballindine =

Village in County Mayo, Ireland

Ballindine Baile an Daighin
- Village
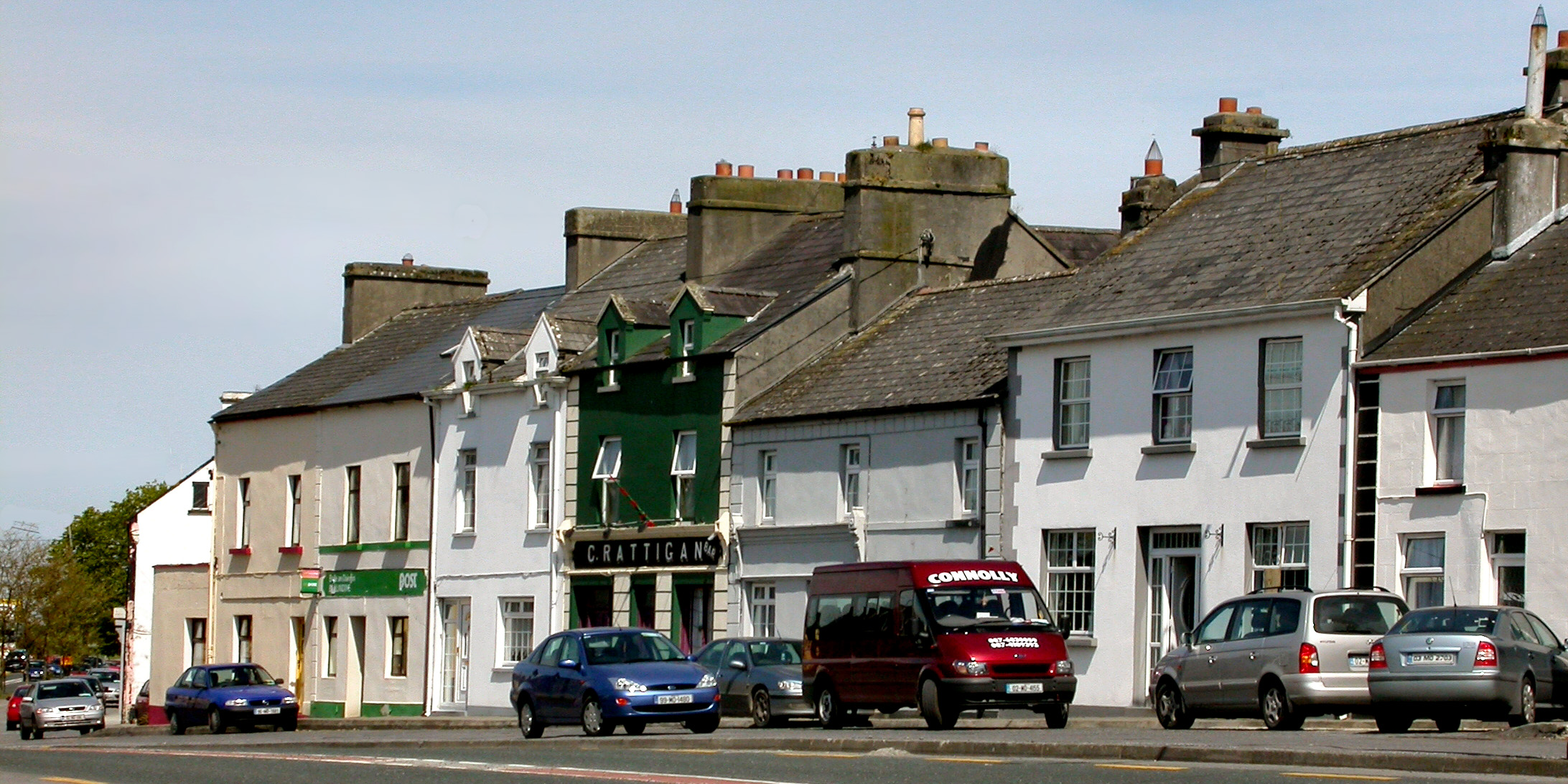
- Ballindine village centre

- Location in Ireland
- Coordinates: 53°40′00″N 8°57′18″W
- Country: Ireland
- Province: Connacht
- County: County Mayo
- Elevation: 96 m (315 ft)

Population (2022)
  - Total: 468
- Time zone: UTC+0 (WET)
  - Summer (DST): UTC-1 (IST (WEST))
- Irish Grid Reference: M369689

Ballindine (Irish: Baile an Daighin, meaning 'town of the fortress') is a village in County Mayo, Ireland. It is located along the Western Railway Corridor, 6.5 km (4 miles) south of Claremorris. The N17 road passes through the village, carrying over 10,000 vehicles daily, and it connects to the R328 road on the south side of town.

== History ==
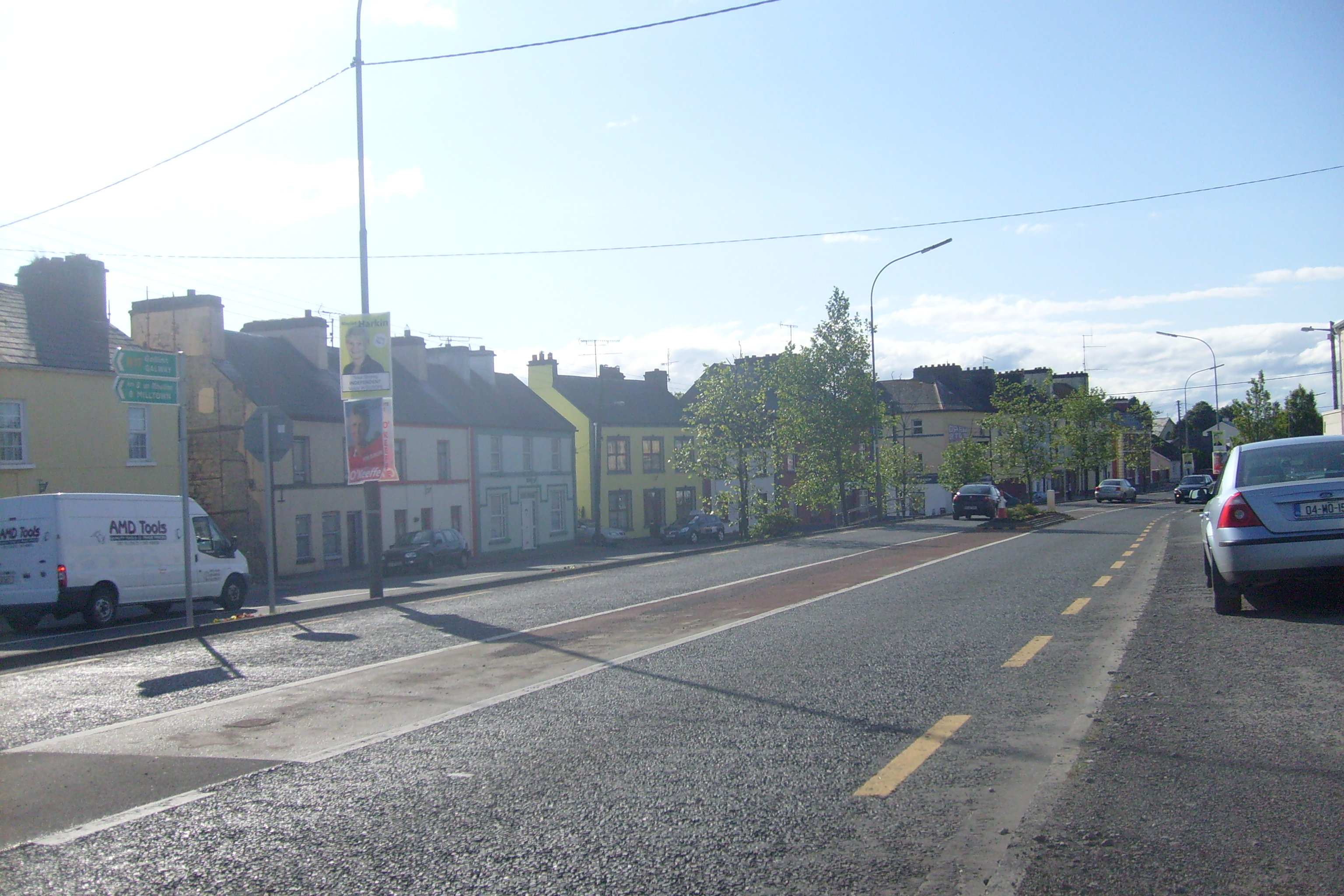
Street in Ballindine

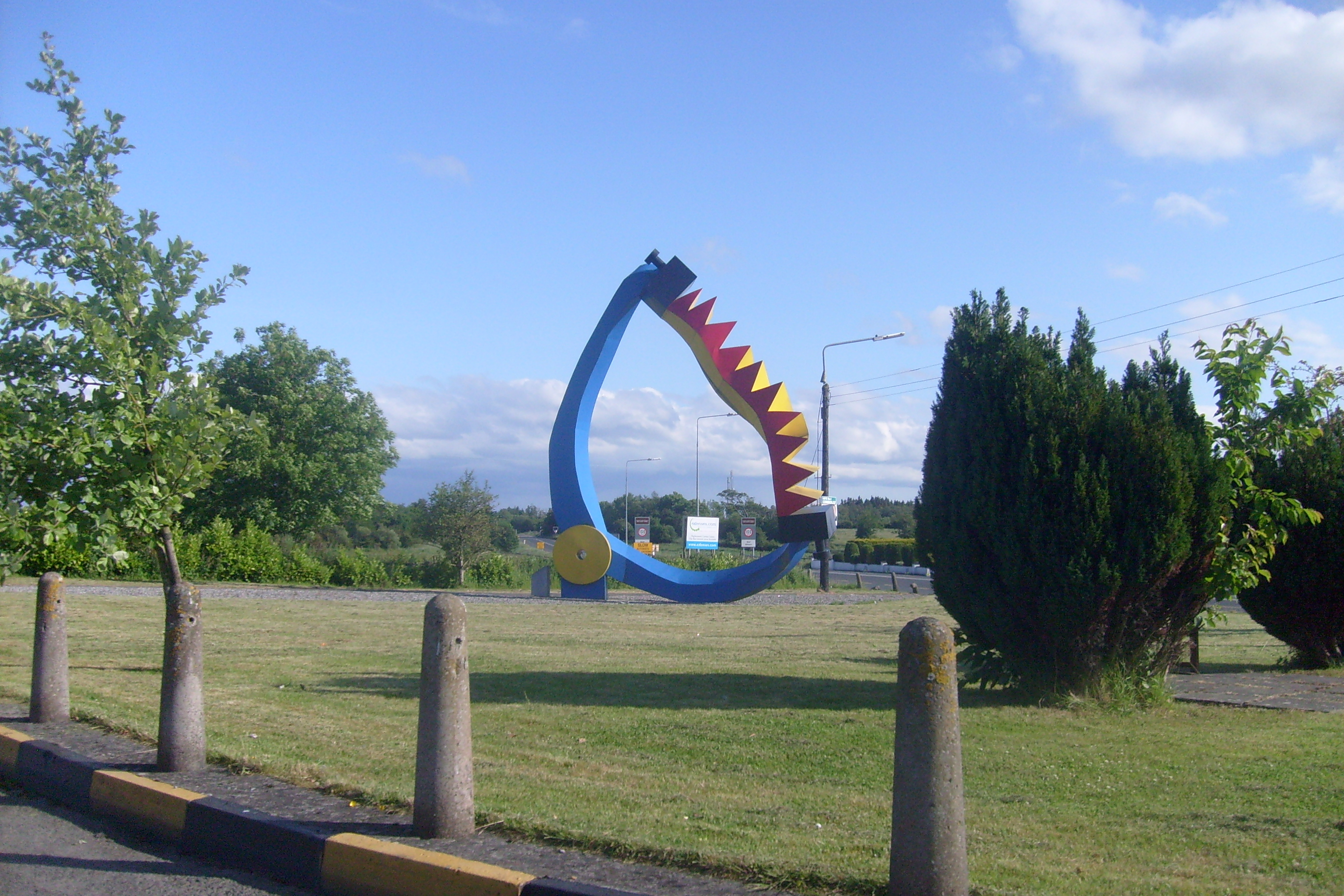
Public art in Ballindine

The remains of a possible fort are located in a field next to the National School. Folklore states that Ballindine got its name from this fort—Baile an Daingin meaning "Town of the Fortress" and that the souterrain, just outside it, was connected underground to the ruins of the old church in Cloonmore about 2 km (1.25 miles) to the east and also to the ruins of the old church in Garryduff, 5 km (3 miles) west.

Ballindine is in the Roman Catholic parish of Kilvine. Church records are held at the South Mayo Family Research Centre in Ballinrobe. Old school records dating to the 1800s are held in the present National School.

== Events and community ==
The village has had a monthly cattle and sheep fair since the 1960s and the Ballindine September fair was well known in West of Ireland. The July fair was also called 'The Gooseberry Fair' and Ballindine marked this tradition with an annual 'Gooseberry Festival' until 2002.

The Western Alzheimer's Foundation is headquartered in Ballindine.

== Sport ==
The Ballindine Gaelic footballers join with Irishtown to form the Davitts team who play in red and black. The combined Davitts club plays in Division 1A league and Senior Championship. In 2011 Davitts won the Intermediate County Championship after beating Burrishoole in the final. They went on to win the Intermediate Connacht Championship after defeating Padraig Pearses.

== Transport ==
Ballindine railway station was opened on 30 April 1894, and closed on 17 June 1963.

The N17 passes through the village. However, as of 2010, the village was due to be bypassed as part of the Claremorris–Tuam dual-carriageway which (as of 2012) was in the early stages of planning.

== Notable people ==
- Sabina Coyne, actress and wife of the President of Ireland, Michael D. Higgins, is a native of Cloonrane, a townland in County Galway one kilometre south of Ballindine.
- Pippa Hackett, Green Party) Senator.
- Pat Rabbitte, former leader of the Labour Party, was born in Woodstock, a townland near the village, and still owns a family home there.

== See also ==
- List of towns and villages in Ireland
