= Frederick William Conway =

Frederick William Conway (1782–1853) was an Irish journalist, newspaper founder and editor.

Conway was probably born in Loughrea, County Galway, where his father ran a newspaper. His entire career was in journalism, becoming the editor of the Dublin Evening Post after 1800. In 1813, he founded the Dublin Political Review and in 1821, The Drama. He was also the proprietor of a newspaper called the "Farmer's Gazette" as of 1846

Although Conway was a supporter of Catholic Emancipation and a member of the Catholic Association. he was believed by Daniel O'Connell to have joined the Association as a mole. O'Connell accordingly nicknamed him "Castle Conway" in reference to a rumoured pension he received from the British civil service based in Dublin Castle. He served as a prosecution witness against O'Connell in "Indictment for a Conspiracy, in the Case of the Queen" in 1844.

He amassed a library of books, manuscripts and incunabula, the sale of which went on for twenty-five days after his death in Dublin, aged seventy-one (many of the books went to the library of Trinity College, Dublin (TCD) and other libraries in Ireland). He collected from a wide variety of topics, largely theology from the Thirteenth to Fifteenth centuries.
