= Loughrea branch line =

Railway line in County Galway, Ireland

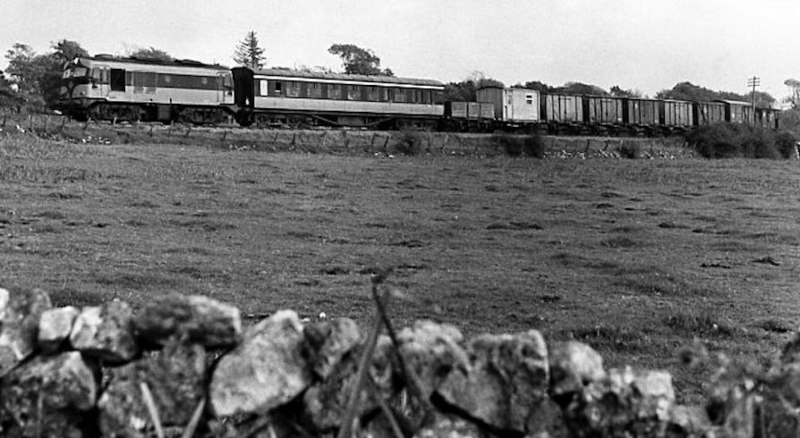
- The 15:30 from Attymon Junction approaches Lynchfort level crossing near Loughrea on 10 October 1975

Overview
- Other names: Attymon & Loughrea Light Railway
- Status: Ceased operation
- Owner: Midland Great Western Railway; Great Southern Railways; Córas Iompair Éireann
- Locale: County Galway, Ireland; 53.26615°N 8.60452°W (Dunsandle station line midpoint)
- Termini: Attymon Junction; Loughrea
- Stations: 3

Service
- Type: Heavy rail
- System: Córas Iompair Éireann
- Operator(s): Midland Great Western Railway; Great Southern Railways; Córas Iompair Éireann

History
- Opened: 1890
- Closed: 1975

Technical
- Line length: 8 miles 75 chains (14.4 km)
- Number of tracks: Single track
- Character: Secondary
- Track gauge: 1,600 mm (5 ft 3 in) Irish gauge
- Electrification: Not electrified

The Loughrea branch line was a railway line in County Galway, Ireland. It opened in 1890 and closed in 1975. The 15 kilometre single track branch ran from the Attymon Junction on the Dublin to Galway main line and terminated at Loughrea. Dunsandle was the single intermediate stop. It was the last rural branch line to survive in Ireland.

== History ==
The Loughrea and Attymon Light Railway company was formed on 24 April 1885 to construct the line. It opened on 1 December 1890 with an agreement in place for the Midland Great Western Railway to operate the line for the next 50 years. However, this arrangement did not run its full term as the line was absorbed into the new Great Southern Railways (GSR) from 1 January 1925. GSR was itself superseded by Córas Iompair Éireann (CIÉ) on 1 January 1945. The line was closed by CIÉ on 3 November 1975 and the track was lifted in 1988. South of the M6 motorway, much of the rail alignment has been used for the construction of the N65 road.

== Rolling stock and services ==
=== Steam era ===
Pictures exist of 2-4-0 and 0-6-0 engines in use on the branch.

The branch had five round trip passenger services at its peak in 1895. Many would be mixed passenger and freight.

=== Diesel era ===
The branch was normally operated by a CIE 611 Class with a single passenger coach. When that locomotive was unavailable for servicing or maintenance a CIE 201 Class Metropolitan-Vickers or a CIE 141 Class would normally substitute. Exceptionally a CIE 001 Class could be used.
