= Attymon railway station =

Railway station in County Galway, Ireland

Attymon Áth Tíomáin
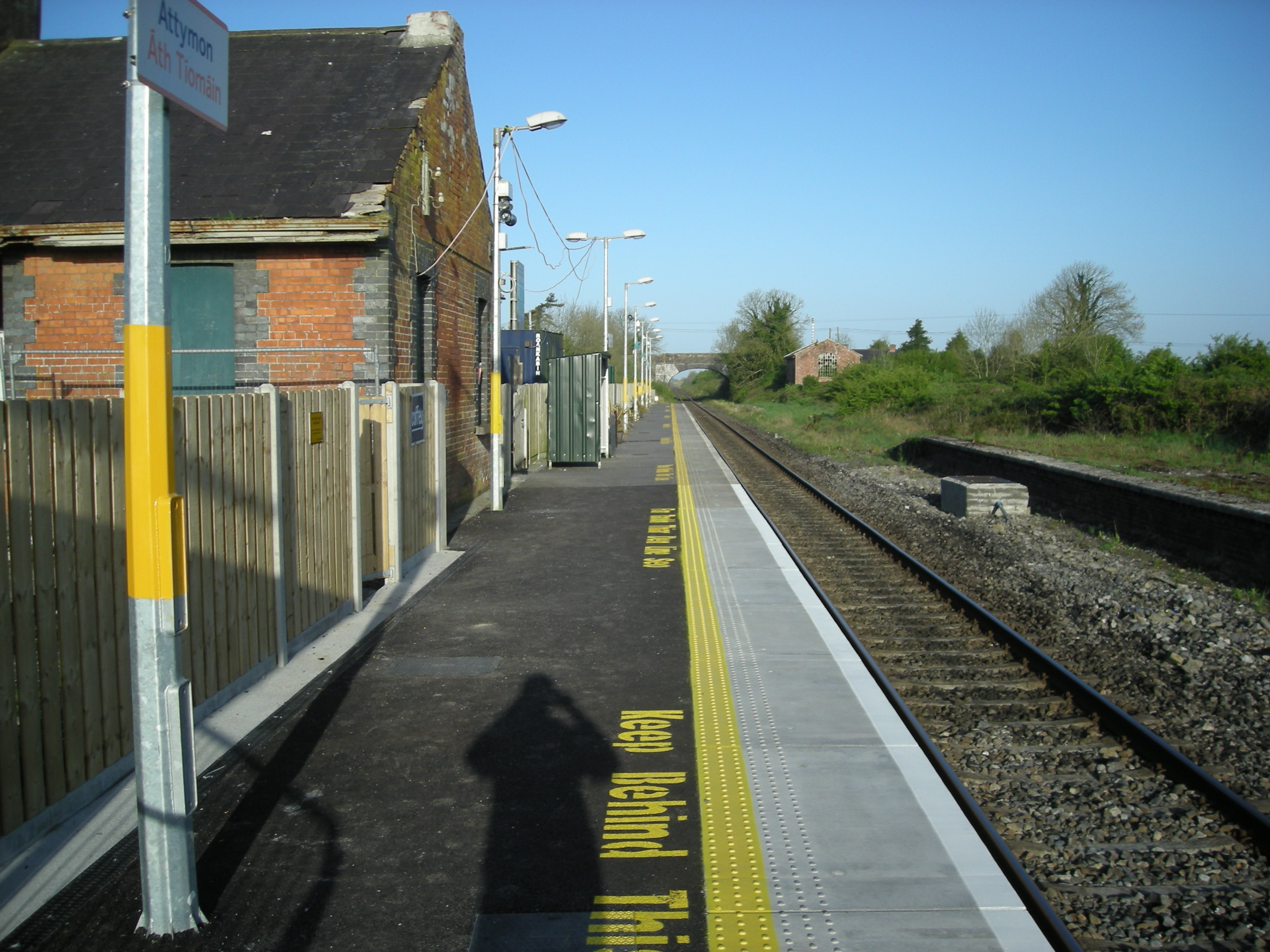

General information
- Location: Attymon, Athenry, County Galway, H65 TX93; Ireland
- Coordinates: 53.3213°N 8.6063°W
- Owner: Iarnród Éireann
- Operator: Iarnród Éireann
- Platforms: 1

Construction
- Structure type: At-grade

Other information
- Station code: ATMON
- Fare zone: N

History
- Opened: 1890

Services
Preceding station	IÉ	Following station
Woodlawn	InterCity; Dublin–Westport/Galway railway line	Athenry
	Disused railways	
Terminus	Midland Great Western Railway; Attymon-Loughrea	Dunsandle
Location

Attymon railway station (Irish: Stáisiún Áth Tíomáin) serves the townland of Attymon in County Galway, Ireland.

The station is on the Dublin to Galway Rail service. Passengers to or from Westport railway station travel to Athlone and change trains. Passengers to or from Limerick and Ennis travel to Athenry and change trains.

== Description ==
It is the smallest station on the Dublin-Galway line consisting of a single platform with no waiting room, just two shelters on the platform. The building at the station is boarded up and used as a store for the line maintenance crew. There is a small free-of-charge car park at the station and a ticket machine is located at the entrance to the platform.

== Local requests for better service ==
Residents of Attymon and the surrounding areas have made numerous requests to Iarnród Éireann to stop further trains in Attymon. On 26 April 2011, a protest numbering some two hundred local people took place at the next station to the east, Woodlawn. The local action group is requesting that Iarnród Éireann improve the eastbound service from the station by allowing a morning Galway to Dublin train to serve the station.

== History ==
Attymon Junction station opened on 1 December 1890.

The station used to link the Dublin-Galway line with a branch line to Loughrea. The line closed in 1975 and the link has been removed. A former railway preservation group called Westrail had hoped to reopen the line as a tourist line but failed to do so.

The station once had three platforms in operation. A former footbridge over the Galway-Dublin track, that joined two of the platforms, is now used by a Dublin city commuter railway station.

== See also ==
- List of railway stations in Ireland
- List of towns and villages in Ireland
