= Lough Rea =

Lake in County Galway, Ireland

- Loch Riach (Irish)
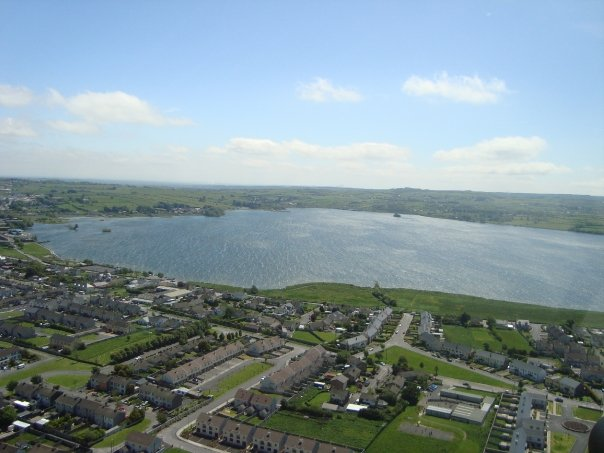
- Aerial view over Loughrea town towards the lake.

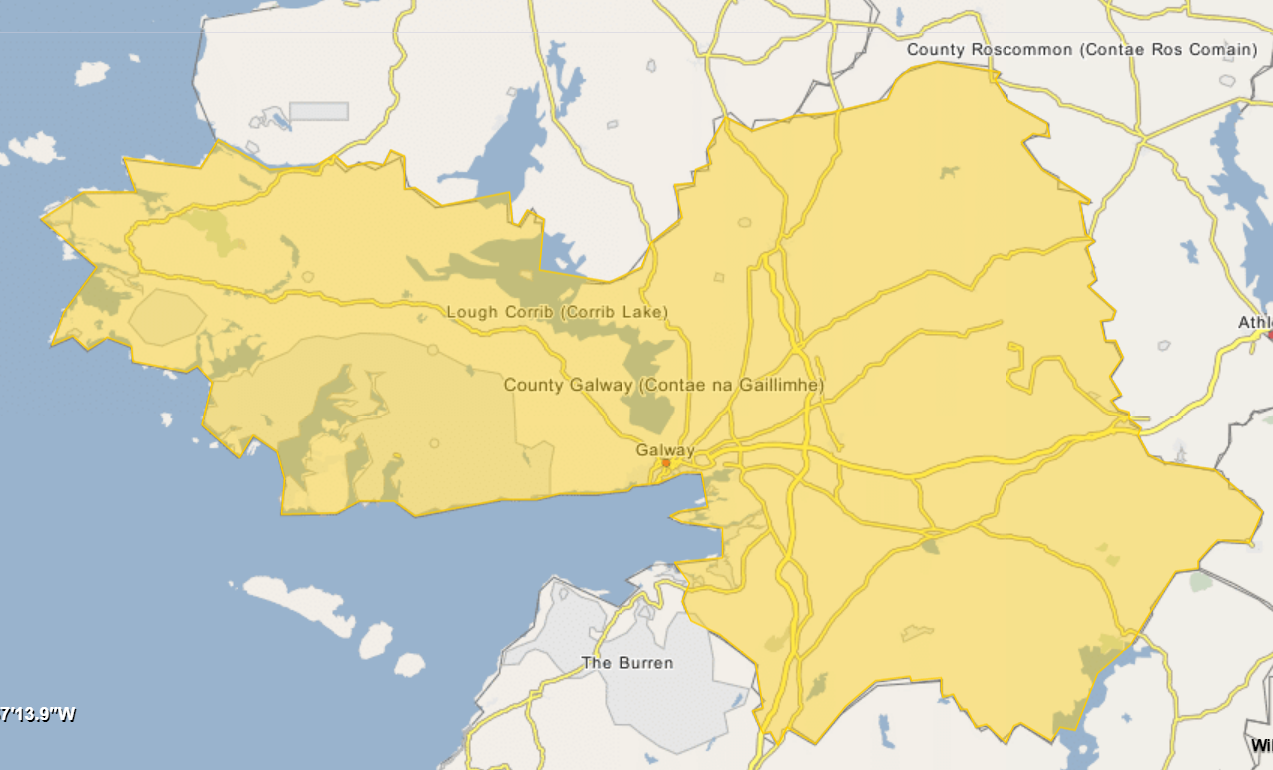
- Location in County Galway
- Location: County Galway, Ireland
- Coordinates: 53.189684°N 8.576302°W
- Lake type: natural freshwater lough
- Primary outflows: Loughrea River Town Moat
- Basin countries: Ireland
- Max. length: 2.61 km (1.62 mi)
- Max. width: 1.68 km (1.04 mi)
- Surface area: 3.01 km^{2} (740 acres)
- Surface elevation: 81 m (266 ft)
- Islands: Ash Island, Shore Island, Blake's Island, Barrack Island, Middle Island, Long Island, Switch Island, Stone Island North, Stone Islands South, Island McCoo
- Settlements: Loughrea

Lough Rea (Irish: Loch Riach, lit. 'speckled lake'), also Loughrea Lake, is a lake in Ireland, located south of Loughrea, County Galway.

== Wildlife ==
Lough Rea is stocked with three-spined stickleback, ninespine stickleback, eel, perch, brown trout, rudd and pike.

== In folklore ==
In the tradition of other Dindsenchas myths, according to Irish tradition, Lough Rea was formed after a battle fought between pre-Christian deities, who took the form of deer. The force of their battle causing a well to burst and the lake to form.

Another popular piece of folklore says that there was once a town where the lake is today, but the town was submerged underneath the water.

== See also ==
- List of loughs in Ireland
