= Loughrea =

Town in County Galway, Ireland

Loughrea Baile Locha Riach (Irish)
- Town
- Signage at the entrance to Loughrea

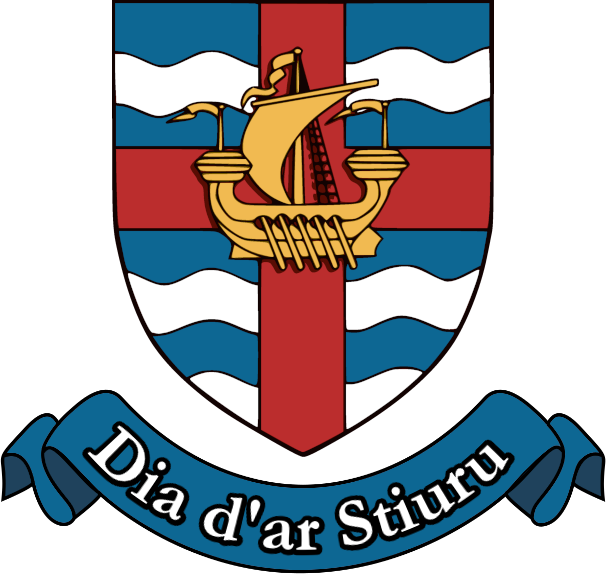
- Coat of arms
- Motto(s): Irish: Dia d'ár Stiúrú "God guiding Us"
- Location in Ireland
- Coordinates: 53.197°N 8.567°W
- Country: Ireland
- Province: Connacht
- County: County Galway
- Elevation: 82 m (269 ft)

Population (2022)
  - Total: 6,322
- Time zone: UTC±0 (WET)
  - Summer (DST): UTC+1 (IST)
- Eircode routing key: H62
- Telephone area code: +353(0)91
- Irish Grid Reference: M621163
- Website: discoverloughrea.com

Loughrea (/lɒxˈreɪ/ lokh-RAY; Irish: Baile Locha Riach, meaning 'town of the grey/speckled lake'), is a town in County Galway, Ireland. It lies to the north of a range of wooded hills, the Slieve Aughty Mountains and Lough Rea, the lake from which it takes its name. The town's cathedral, St Brendan's, dominates the urban skyline. The town is in a townland and civil parish of the same name.

The town increased in population in the late 20th and early 21st centuries. Although Loughrea serves as a commuter town for the city of Galway, it remains an independent market town. Loughrea is the fourth most populous settlement in County Galway, with a population of 6,322 as of 2022.

== Name ==
The town takes its name from Lough Rea, Irish: Loch Riach (riach being a variant of riabhach meaning grey or speckled). It is situated on the northern shore of the lake. The lake's Irish name is used in the name of the local Irish-language multi-faith primary school: Gaelscoil Riabhach. The town is located within an area that was historically called Trícha Máenmaige, and a barony called Loughrea.

== History ==
=== Pre-Norman ===
The town is in an area that was historically called Trícha Máenmaige, which was under the control of Ui Fhiachrach Fionn, and later of the Uí Maine. The area contains many examples of Gaelic and Early Christian settlements. There is evidence of crannog settlements on the Lake of Loughrea, with up to 14 individual crannogs identified dating back to the 6th–7th centuries AD.

=== Norman settlement ===
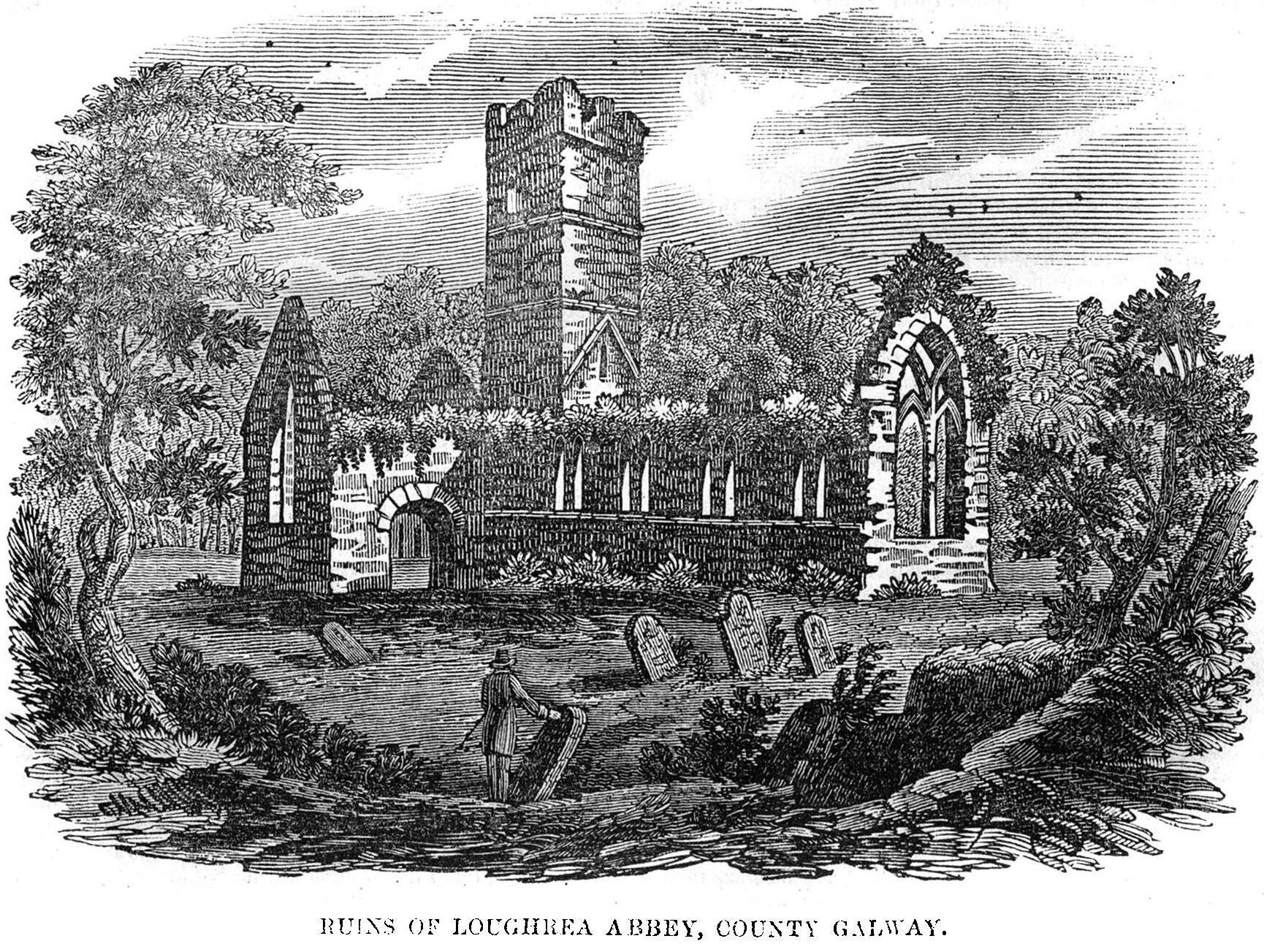
Ruins of Loughrea Abbey, 1834, Dublin Penny Journal

The modern town was founded in 1236 by Richard de Burgo, an Anglo-Norman knight who built a castle along an ancient route between the River Shannon and the west coast. Today the remains of the medieval town wall, medieval priory, moat and a town gate are all still to be seen. The House of Burgh adopted the names and customs of Gaelic Ireland and became closely intermarried and related to the local Gaelic nobility of Ireland. The Burghs even assumed the White Wand and the role of Irish clan chiefs in the following centuries, until 1543 when Ulick "Bourck, alias Mac William", embraced the surrender and regrant policies of Henry VIII, receiving it back to pass down under primogeniture with the new title, the Earl of Clanricarde.

=== Pre-Famine ===
By the 1700s, Loughrea was a regional market and garrison town. During the Williamite War in Ireland, an attempt by Williamite forces to take Galway was defeated in a short skirmish at Loughrea.

=== Post-Famine ===
Loughrea was at the centre of the Gaelic Revival towards the end of the 19th century. The various elements of this revival in the town included Celtic Revival Art, the Irish Literary Revival, Gaelic games and the Irish language revival.

=== Independence ===
Like many towns with garrisons, there was little support for the 1916 rebellion in Dublin, though some locals supported the rising in Galway. There was a Battalion of Irish Volunteers in Loughrea. They were not involved in any major battles and instead they mainly protected the local Sinn Féin Club members.

=== 20th century ===
From 1920 until 1960 Loughrea maintained its role as a market town. The town is also the cathedral town of the Roman Catholic diocese of Clonfert, and the 20th century saw a number of large-scale religious events. The 1960s brought industrial developments such as the Tynagh Mines.

== Economy ==
Loughrea was historically a farming town that cut its industrial teeth with the Tynagh mines, 10 km (6 mi) to the east. There is now a gas-powered electricity power station on the site of the mines. As well as being a dormitory town for Galway, Loughrea now hosts a number of pharmaceutical and data-processing industries. Loughrea's tourist infrastructure is supported by two hotels, a country resort, as well as a number of bed-and-breakfasts, restaurants, coffee shops and pubs.

== Demographics ==
Historical population
Year	Pop.	±%
1821	5,849	—
1831	6,268	+7.2%
1841	5,458	−12.9%
1851	3,621	−33.7%
1861	3,072	−15.2%
1871	3,072	+0.0%
1881	3,159	+2.8%
1891	2,815	−10.9%
1901	2,557	−9.2%
1911	2,388	−6.6%
1926	2,805	+17.5%
1936	2,891	+3.1%
1946	2,887	−0.1%
1951	2,847	−1.4%
1956	2,834	−0.5%
1961	2,784	−1.8%
1966	3,001	+7.8%
1971	3,075	+2.5%
1981	3,378	+9.9%
1986	3,360	−0.5%
1991	3,271	−2.6%
1996	3,335	+2.0%
2002	4,004	+20.1%
2006	4,532	+13.2%
2011	5,062	+11.7%
2016	5,556	+9.8%
2022	6,322	+13.8%

In the 20 years between the 2002 and 2022 census of Ireland, the population of Loughrea increased from 4,004 to 6,322 people.

As of the 2022 census, 4,770 of the town's inhabitants were Irish citizens, 107 held UK citizenship, 203 were from Poland, 297 were from elsewhere in the European Union, 128 were Indian citizens, 437 held other citizenships, while 336 did not state their citizenship.

White Irish were the largest ethnic group in Loughrea as of the 2022 census, with 3,911 of the population identifying as such, followed by Other White (828), White Irish Traveller (196), Asian or Asian Irish (356) and Black or Black Irish (128), with the rest identifying as other or not stating their ethnicity.

Roman Catholicism was the most predominant religion in the town in 2022, with 4,049 residents identifying as Catholic. 779 people stated that they were of other religions, with 1,494 people indicating that they had no religion or no stated religion.

== Places of interest ==
The Cathedral of St. Brendan on the lakeshore, in the town centre, is considered an important repository of Celtic Revival art and architecture. St. Brendan's Catholic Cathedral was designed by William Byrne in 1897 and completed five years later. Its double transepts are an unusual architectural feature. Spring-fed Loughrea Lake (Lough Rea) is overlooked by Knockash and fished for brown trout, pike and perch. There are also rudd, brook lamprey, three-spined stickleback, nine-spined stickleback and eels in the lake. The lake is home to many waterbirds. Migratory species from Europe live at the lake during the winter, and it provides nesting grounds for other species during the summer. The lake is listed as a site of international importance for the shoveler and a site of national importance for the coot and tufted duck. It is also used for water sports and swimming. Immediately behind the Loughrea boathouse are the remains of an old crannog. The Loughrea dwellers in ancient times would have sought protection from raiders by living in the comparative security provided by the lake.

There is a stone relief sculpture in town, on Millenium House, West Bridge, of Stoney Brennan's face. Brennan "according to legend, was hanged on Gallows’ Hill at Mount Carmel for stealing a turnip" during the 1700s.

== Transport ==
Loughrea is connected to the M6 Dublin-Galway motorway via the N65. The town was historically served by the Midland Great Western Railway and a railway branch from Attymon Junction, in use until 1975. This line was Ireland's last operational rural railway branch line, having outlasted most other country railway lines of this type by 10–20 years, and even surviving to have diesel trains used on it. The link road from the Ballinasloe–Galway motorway to Loughrea removed most of the remains of the original track bed. Loughrea railway station opened on 1 December 1890 and finally closed on 3 November 1975.

== Sport and culture ==
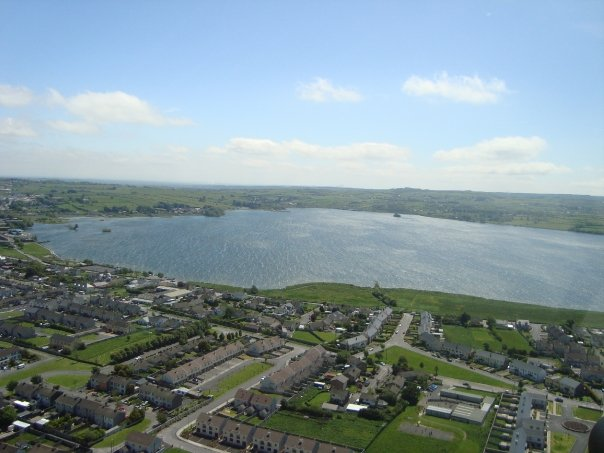
Loughrea Lake

Hurling is one of the dominant sports in the town and its immediate outskirts. Loughrea GAA Club were 2006 winners of both the Galway Senior Hurling and Connacht Senior Club Hurling Championships. They also reached the 2007 All-Ireland Senior Club Hurling Championship final, losing out to Ballyhale Shamrocks. Loughrea also has a rugby club, a soccer club, a Gaelic football club, a volleyball club, an 18-hole golf course, a cycling club and an athletic club.

Actor Kiefer Sutherland reportedly has an affection for the town, twice visiting family as a young boy and is said to have been amazed at the skill of the players down at the handball alley.

Each year, in October, the town plays host to the BAFFLE International Poetry Festival. Loughrea also has a Musical and Dramatic Society, historical society, and a community association. In the 2018 National Glór na nGael awards for "Irish language in local communities", Loughrea's "Gaeilge Locha Riach" was awarded best voluntary committee in Connaught. Gaeilge Locha Riach promotes the Irish language in Loughrea among the community and businesses. There is also a Foróige Youth club in the town.

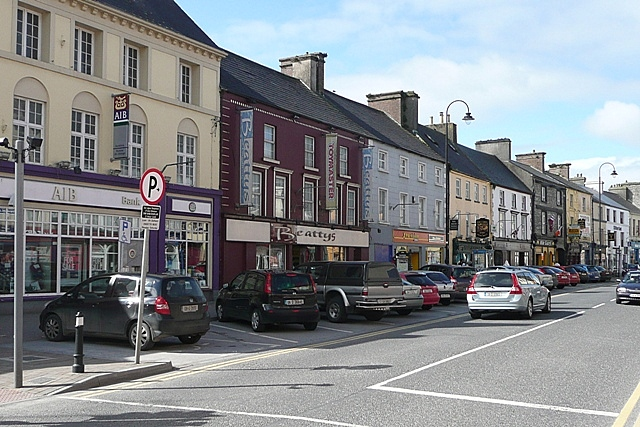
Loughrea Main Street

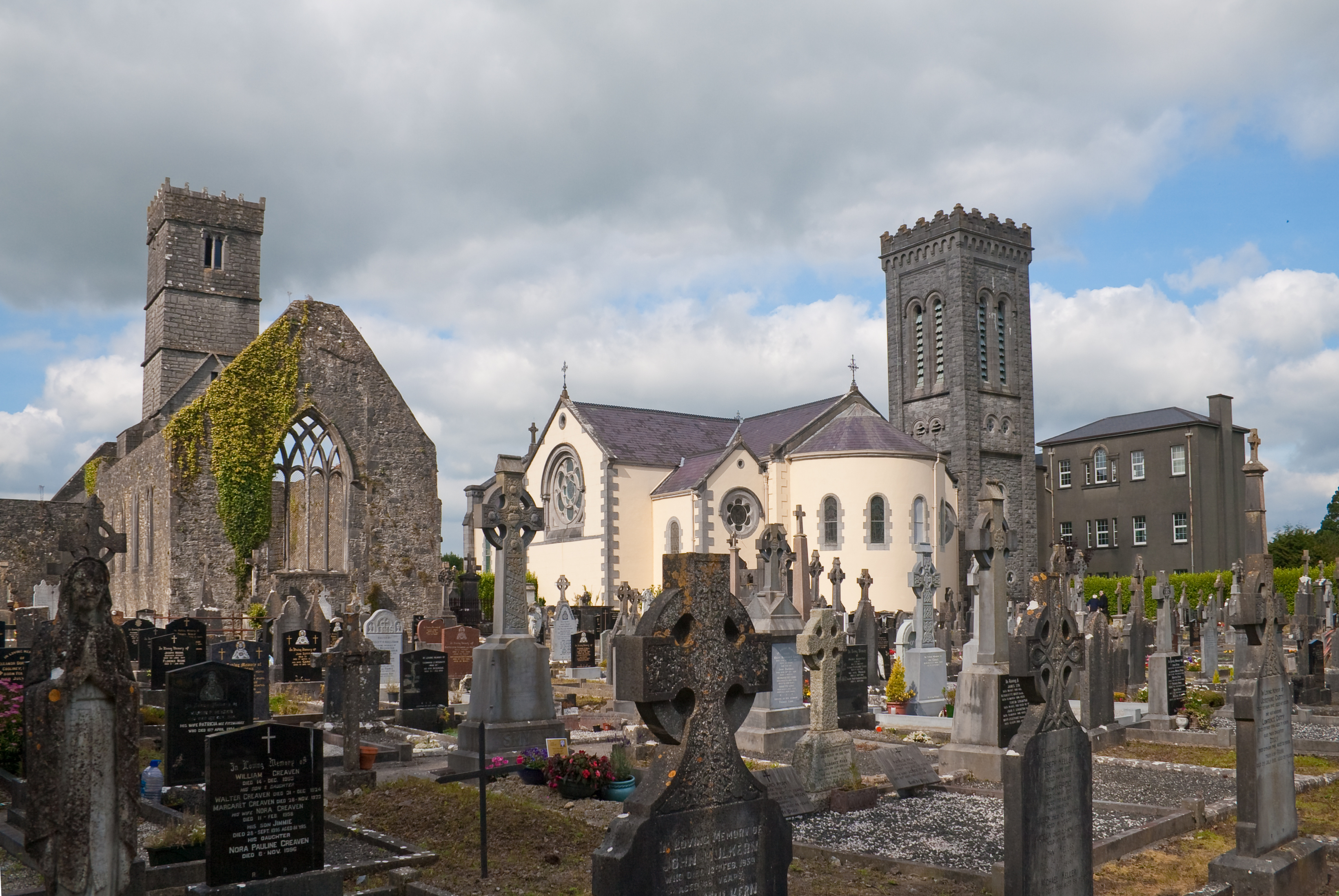
The old and new priories in Loughrea

Each year, the local triathlon club organises a junior and senior triathlon event. Loughrea's triathlon is part of the national event calendar under Triathlon Ireland rules.

== Notable people ==
- Mark Boyle (born 1979), Irish social activist and writer also known as "The Moneyless Man" owing to his choice in 2008 to stop using money. Though not born in Loughrea, Boyle lives his moneyless, tech-less life near Loughrea.
- William Malachy Burke (1819–1879), physician and Registrar General
- Johnny Coen, former Galway hurler and All-Ireland winner 2017
- Ciaran Fitzgerald, former Irish rugby International.
- Seumas O'Kelly (1881–1918), playwright and nationalist

== See also ==
- Frederick William Conway
- List of abbeys and priories in Ireland (County Galway)
- List of towns and villages in Ireland
- Marquis de St Ruth
