= Padraig Gearr Ó Mannin =

Padraig Gearr Ó Mannin (fl. 1798) was a United Irishman who participated in the Irish Rebellion of 1798 in County Mayo.

Ó Mannin was a native of Carnacregg, Menlough. Following news of the French landing under General Jean Humbert at Killala on 23 August 1798, and of the rout of government militia at the Battle of Castlebar on the 27th, a party of several dozen men from Menlough and its surrounding area assembled and marched towards County Mayo. However, after only a day, they were informed of the failure of the rebellion and were forced to return home. For several decades after there was bad blood between the United Irishmen of Counties Mayo and Galway, with the former taunting the Galwegians Where were the Galwaymen in the fight at Ballina?

Upon his return, Ó Mannin lived unobtrusively with his mother. However, a regiment of British foot soldiers were passing through Menlough, to participate in the Battle of Ballinamuck. Ó Mannin was forced to hide in his garden to avert arrest.

Two straggler soldiers entered his house and demanded food and drink from his mother. Upon finishing their meal, one of them noticed some bacon hanging in the kitchen. The bally old bitch did not give us a feed of the bacon, said one, to which the other replied She did not! Kill her!

At the sound of her screams, Padraig Gearr leapt over the garden fence, and with his blackthorn stick, he beat both soldiers till they were bleeding and prostrate on the floor. They recovered and made off.

Some days later, the regiment returned to Menlough and stopped outside Ó Mannin's house, and an officer called upon him to give an explanation for the incident.

The officer accepted his explanation, but said I'll put a sword in your hand and you must fight the pick man of my regiment in single combat. Ó Mannin replied No, but take out any two in your regiment with their swords and I'll fight them with my blackthorn and I will fight your whole regiment in pairs.

The officer was much impressed by Ó Mannin's bravado and said so. You are a brave man. here is a half sovereign, and drink to my health.

Ó Mannin lived on, and upon his death was buried at Killascobe, where his grave could be pointed out by his descendants as late as the 1940s. For some reason, it is known as the grave of Billy Ó Mannin, which was perhaps a nickname. The surname is generally now rendered as Mannion

== See also ==
- Soghain
- Ó Mannin
- James MacHugo
- Neddy Lohan
- Thunderbolt Gibbons
- Captain Kitt
- Anthony Daly
