= All-Ireland Senior Club Camogie Championship 1983 =

Camogie championship

Winners
- Champions: Buffers Alley (Wexford) (4th title)
- Manager: Norah Gahan

Runners-up
- Runners-up: Glenamaddy (Gal)

The 1983 All-Ireland Senior Club Camogie Championship for the leading clubs in the women's team field sport of camogie was won by Buffers Alley from Wexford, who defeated Glenamaddy from Galway in the final, played at Monamolin. It was the third in a record sequence of four in a row won by the club.

== Arrangements ==
The championship was organised on the traditional provincial system used in Gaelic Games since the 1880s, with Swatragh and Croagh-Kilfinny winning the championships of the other two provinces.

== The Final ==
Alley started with 1-4 to no reply and ran out easy winners in the final.

=== Final stages ===
September 1
Semi-Final

Buffers Alley (Wx)	1-5 – 0-1	Swatragh

Swatragh

September 8
Semi-Final

Glenamaddy (Gal)	3-3 – 1-0	Croagh-Kilfinny

October 30
Final

Buffers Alley (Wx)	3-7 – 0-6	Glenamaddy (Gal)

Monamolin

Buffers Alley	Glenamaddy

Buffers Alley (Wx):
GK	1	Terri Butler
FB	2	Ann Butler
RWB	3	Geraldine Wynne
CB	4	Margaret Leacy
LWB	5	Stellah Sinnott
MF	6	Fiona Cousins
MF	7	Elsie Walsh
MF	8	Norah Gahan (captain)
RWF	9	Caroline Farrington
CF	10	Gertrude O'Leary
LWF	11	Bridie Doran
FF	12	Teresa Hobbs

Glenamaddy (Gal):
GK	1	Chris Divilly
FB	2	Rita Divilly
RWB	3	Kitty Hoey
CB	4	Claire Geraghty
LWB	5	Claire Dolan
MF	6	Teresa Garvey
MF	7	Mary Kelly
MF	8	Teresa Rafferty
RWF	9	Catherine Ward
CF	10	Anne Divilly
LWF	11	Anne Gallagher
FF	12	Kathleen Garvey

Preceded by All-Ireland Senior Club Camogie Championship 1982	All-Ireland Senior Club Camogie Championship; 1964 – present	Succeeded by All-Ireland Senior Club Camogie Championship 1984
