= All-Ireland Senior Club Camogie Championship 1984 =

Camogie championship

Winners
- Champions: Buffers Alley (Wexford) (5th title)
- Manager: Mick Butler
- Captain: Norah Gahan

Runners-up
- Runners-up: Killeagh (Cork)
- Manager: Bertie Tory

The 1984 All-Ireland Senior Club Camogie Championship for the leading clubs in the women's team field sport of camogie was won for the fourth year in succession by Buffers Alley from Wexford who defeated Killeagh from Cork) in the final, played at Monamolin.

== Arrangements ==
The championship was organised on the traditional provincial system used in Gaelic Games since the 1880s, with Glenamaddy and Leitrim Fontenoys from Down winning the championships of the other two provinces. Marion Sweeney, Patricia Fitzgibbon and Anne Leahy scored Killeagh's goals in their victory over Leitrim. Elsie Cody, Gertrude O'Leary and Bridie Doran scored Buffers Alley's goals in their semi-final victory over Glenamaddy, while Kitty Hoey and Kathleen Garvey scored Glenamaddy's goals.

== The Final ==
Gertrude O'Leary’s goal secured a comeback victory for Buffers Alley in the final.

=== Final stages ===
September 1
Semi-Final

Buffers Alley (Wx)	3-1 – 2-2	Glenamaddy

Glenamaddy

September 8
Semi-Final

Killeagh (Cork)	3-3 – 0-2	Leitrim

Leitrim

October 28
Final

Buffers Alley (Wx)	2-4 – 1-4	Killeagh (Cork)

Monamolin

Buffers Alley (Wx)	Killeagh (Cork)

Buffers Alley (Wx):
GK	1	Kathleen Tonks
FB	2	Ann Butler
RWB	3	Geraldine Wynne
CB	4	Drothy Kenny
LWB	5	Elsie Cody
MF	6	Fiona Cousins
MF	7	Stellah Sinnott
MF	8	Norah Gahan (captain)
RWF	9	Caroline Farrington
CF	10	Gertrude O'Leary
LWF	11	Bridie Doran
FF	12	Teresa Hobbs

Killeagh (Cork):
GK	1	Kathleen Costine
FB	2	Marie O'Donovan
RWB	3	Mary Spillane
CB	4	Cathy Landers
LWB	5	Bereda Landers
MF	6	Patsy Keniry
MF	7	Shelley Spillane
MF	8	Ann Marie Landers
RWF	9	Brenie Costine
CF	10	Anne Leahy
LWF	11	Patricia Fitzgibbon
FF	12	Marion Sweeney (captain)

Preceded by All-Ireland Senior Club Camogie Championship 1983	All-Ireland Senior Club Camogie Championship; 1964 – present	Succeeded by All-Ireland Senior Club Camogie Championship 1985
