= Galway Junior Football Championship =

Annual Gaelic football competition

The Galway Junior Football Championship is an annual Gaelic football competition contested by lower-tier Galway GAA clubs. The winners of the Galway Championship qualify to represent their county in the Connacht Junior Club Football Championship. The winners also receive promotion to compete in the following year's intermediate grade.

Despite the competition's name, senior clubs may also play in this competition: for example, in 2018 Corofin won it.

== Qualification for subsequent competitions ==
=== Connacht Junior Club Football Championship ===
The Galway JFC winners qualify for the Connacht Junior Club Football Championship. It is the only team from County Galway to qualify for this competition. The Galway JFC winners enter the Connacht Junior Club Football Championship at the quarter-final stage. For example, 2018 runner-up Clonbur (who were defeated by senior club Corofin in the 2018 final) played in the Connacht JFC final.

=== All-Ireland Junior Club Football Championship ===
The Galway JFC winners — by winning the Connacht Junior Club Football Championship — may qualify for the All-Ireland Junior Club Football Championship, at which they would enter at the semi-final stage, providing they haven't been drawn to face the British champions in the quarter-finals.

== Roll of honour ==
Year	Winner	Score	Runner-Up	Score
2025	Carna Caiseal	2-15	Williamstown	2-14
2024	An Cheathrú Rua	2-11	Killererin	0-14
2023	Menlough	0-12	Tuam Stars	0-07
2022	Clifden	3-12	Athenry	1-11
2021	Moycullen	4-09	Claregalway	1-11
2020	St Brendan's	0-19	Clifden	2-08
2019	Glenamaddy	2-12	Salthill Knocknacarra	1-09
2018	Corofin	2-17	Clonbur	2-08
2017	St Gabriel's	0-12	Clonbur	0-09
2016	Oranmore-Maree	4-16	St Gabriel's	1-07
2015	Clifden	1–11	St Gabriels	1–07
2014	Oileáin Árann	0-16	Annaghdown	1-10
2013	Headford	2-10	Tuam Stars	0-14
2012	Ballinasloe	2-16	Clifden	4-09
2011	Clonbur	2-11	Headford	1-08
2010	Salthill-Knocknacarra	0-14	Ballinasloe	1-06
2009	An Spidéal	0-13	Headford	1-08
2008	Athenry	0-11	Renvyle	1-07
2007	St Colmans			
2006	Clifden			
2005	Loughrea		Salthill Knocknacara	
2004	Tuam Stars			
2003	Salthill Knocknacara		Kilconly	
2002				
2001	Salthill Knocknacara		Kilconly	
2000				
1999	Monivea-Abbeyknockmoy			
1998	Claregalway			
1997	St Grellans			
1996				
1995				
1994	Loughrea			
1993				
1992				
1991				
1990				
1989	Killererin			
1988				
1987	Mervue			
