= All-Ireland Senior Club Camogie Championship 1978 =

Camogie championship

Winners
- Champions: Ballyagran (Limerick) (1st title)
- Captain: Pauline McCarthy

Runners-up
- Runners-up: Buffers Alley (Wx)
- Captain: Kathleen Tonks

The 1978 All-Ireland Senior Club Camogie Championship for the leading clubs in the women's team field sport of camogie was won by Ballyagran of Limerick, who defeated Buffers Alley from Wexford in the final, played at Monamolin. That was the last club final to be played with the second crossbar, the "points bar," as per the rules of the game as amended by Congress in 1929.

== Arrangements ==
The championship was organised on the traditional provincial system used in Gaelic Games since the 1880s, with Portglenone defeating Swatragh in the Ulster final (with former Ahane player Vera Mackey on their side) and Athenry winning the Connacht championship. In Munster Ballyagran defeated Éire Óg from Cork and then got a bye from the Tipperary champions. They then staged a great second half recovery against Portglenone, who led 2–4 to 0–1 by half-time, to win the semi-final. Every member of the Buffers Alley team had played inter county players at senior or junior grade.

== The Final ==
The scale of the Ballyagran victory was unexpected, a five-point margin in one of the lowest scoring finals.

Agnes Hourigan wrote in the Irish Press:

Ballyagran scored an unexpectedly easy victory over Buffers Alley. Six of the Ballyagran team were on the Limerick senior team which won Al-Ireland junior medals in 1977, and five of the team played in the 1978 National Camogie League final, goalie Helen Butler, Pauline McCarthy, the O'Brien sister Geraldine and Bernadette and Liz Hayes.

=== Final stages ===
November 5
Semi-Final

Ballyagran (Lk)	4-3 – 2-5	Portglenone

Portglenone

November 5
Semi-Final

Buffers Alley (Wx)	2-6 – 0-8	Athenry

Athenry

Nov 19
Final

Ballyagran (Lk)	1-3 – 0-1	Buffers Alley (Wx)

Monamolin

Ballyagran	Buffers Alley

Ballyagran (Lk):
GK	1	Helen Butler
FB	2	Anne Fahy
RWB	3	Breda Murphy
CB	4	Geraldine O'Brien
LWB	5	Liz Hayes
MF	6	Bernadette O'Brien
MF	7	Pauline McCarthy (captain)
MF	8	Vera Mackey
RWF	9	Margaret Mary O'Keeffe
CF	10	Marita Murphy
LWF	11	Margaret Carroll
FF	12	Margo O'Connell

Buffers Alley (Wx):
GK	1	Kathleen Tonks
FB	2	Margaret Leacy
RWB	3	Geraldine Duggan
CB	4	Martina Cousins
LWB	5	Deirdre Cousins
MF	6	Fiona Cousins
MF	7	Dorothy Walsh
MF	8	Teresa Hobbs
RWF	9	Caroline O'Leary
CF	10	Maggie Hearne
LWF	11	Bridie Jacob
FF	12	Ann Butler

Preceded by All-Ireland Senior Club Camogie Championship 1977	All-Ireland Senior Club Camogie Championship; 1964 – present	Succeeded by All-Ireland Senior Club Camogie Championship 1979
