= Galway Intermediate Football Championship =

Annual Gaelic football competition

- Current season or competition: 2026 Galway Intermediate Football Championship
- Irish: Craobh Idirmhéanach Peile na Gaillimhe
- Code: Gaelic football
- Founded: 1982
- Region: County Galway (GAA)
- Trophy: John Cotter Cup
- Title holders: Moycullen (3rd title)
- First winner: St Gabriel's
- Most titles: Oughterard (4 titles)

The Galway Intermediate Football Championship, abbreviated as Galway IFC, is an annual Gaelic Athletic Association competition between the senior and junior Gaelic football clubs in Galway. The winners of the Galway Championship qualify to represent their county in the Connacht Intermediate Club Football Championship, the winners of which go on to the All-Ireland Intermediate Club Football Championship. The winning team is presented with the John Cotter Cup.

2024 saw the competition take on a new format, with group stages consisting of 4 groups of 4 teams. Although it is called the 'Intermediate' championship, senior teams may compete in the competition. For example, Corofin and Claregalway competed in the 2026 edition.

== Qualification for subsequent competitions ==
=== Connacht Intermediate Club Football Championship ===
The winners of the Galway Intermediate Football Championship qualify for the Connacht Intermediate Club Football Championship, where they compete against the intermediate club champions from the other counties in Connacht. The winners of the provincial championship qualify for the All-Ireland Intermediate Club Football Championship.

A number of Galway champions have subsequently won the Connacht Intermediate Club Football Championship. Caherlistrane won the provincial title in 2005, defeating Boyle of Roscommon by 0–13 to 0–5 in the final.

Moycullen won the title in 2007, defeating Ballintubber of Mayo by 3–11 to 1–8.

St Michael's retained the title for Galway in 2008, defeating Kilbride of Roscommon by 1–9 to 1–8.

In 2009, Naomh Anna, Leitir Móir became the third successive Galway winners, defeating Westport of Mayo by 2–14 to 2–13 in the provincial final.

St James' won the championship in 2010, defeating Strokestown of Roscommon by 0–14 to 1–9.

An Spidéal became the next Galway winners in 2018, defeating Fuerty of Roscommon by 1–14 to 0–16 in the final at Tuam Stadium.

Oughterard won the 2019 championship, defeating The Neale of Mayo by 1–16 to 0–11 in the final.

Dunmore MacHales became the next Galway winners in 2022, defeating St Dominic's of Roscommon by 1–16 to 1–13.

=== All-Ireland Intermediate Club Football Championship ===
The winners of the Connacht Intermediate Club Football Championship progress to the All-Ireland Intermediate Club Football Championship, where they compete against the champions of the other three provincial championships.

Two Galway clubs have won the All-Ireland Intermediate Club Football Championship.

Moycullen became the first Galway club to win the competition when they claimed the 2007–08 All-Ireland Intermediate Club Football Championship. Having won the Galway and Connacht championships in 2007, Moycullen defeated Dublin champions Fingal Ravens by 2–9 to 1–6 in the All-Ireland final at Croke Park on 17 February 2008.

Oughterard became the second Galway club to win the competition when they claimed the 2019–20 All-Ireland Intermediate Club Football Championship. Oughterard defeated Kerry champions Templenoe by 1–12 to 0–12 in the All-Ireland semi-final. They subsequently defeated Monaghan champions Magheracloone by 2–16 to 0–12 in the final at Croke Park on 25 January 2020.

=== Top Winners ===
Club	Wins	Years won	Runner‑up finishes	Years runner‑up
Oughterard	4	1984, 1996, 2001, 2019	1	2011
Cortoon Shamrocks	3	1999, 2003, 2020	3	1982, 1984, 1997
St Michael's	3	1985, 2008, 2024	2	1983, 1995
Naomh Anna, Leitir Móir	3	1995, 2009, 2021	2	1988, 2002
St Grellan's	3	1986, 1992, 2000	0	–
Moycullen	2	2007, 2015	2	1985, 2014
Claregalway	2	2002, 2017	1	2013
Killanin	2	1991, 2014	0	–
Dunmore MacHales	2	1993, 2022	2	2004, 2021
Monivea-Abbey	2	2016, 2023	0	–
Menlough	2	2006, 2013	0	–
Clonbur	2	1989, 1994	2	2003, 2005
Caltra	2	1997, 2025	2	1990, 2024
Caherlistrane	1	2005	2	2004, 2023
Annaghdown	1	1990	1	1996
St James'	1	2010	2	2006, 2009
Kilconly	1	2011	1	2022
Carna-Cashel	1	2012	0	–
Mountbellew-Moylough	1	1998	0	–
Mervue	1	1988	0	–
An Cheathrú Rua	1	1987	0	–
Salthill	1	1983	0	–
St Gabriel's	1	1982	0	–
St Brendan's	0	–	3	1989, 1991, 1994
Athenry	0	–	3	2007, 2012, 2015
Kilkerrin-Clonberne	0	–	3	1993, 2016, 2020
An Spidéal	0	–	3	1999, 2010, 2025
Bearna	0	–	2	1986, 1998
Micheál Breathnach	0	–	2	2018, 2019
Corofin	0	–	1	2000
Headford	0	–	1	1987
Oranmore-Maree	0	–	1	1992
Glenamaddy	0	–	1	2008
Williamstown	0	–	1	2017

== Roll of honour ==
Year	Winner	Score	Opponent	Score
1982	St Gabriel's	2–15	Cortoon Shamrocks	0–10
1983	Salthill	3–07	St Michael's	1–04
1984	Oughterard	2–15	Cortoon Shamrocks	1–04
1985	St Michael's	2–08	Moycullen	2–05
1986	St Grellan's	0–13	Barna	0–03
1987	An Cheathrú Rua	0–12	Headford	2–05
1988	Mervue	1–08	Naomh Anna, Leitir Móir	1–05
1989	Clonbur	1–08	St Brendan's	0–09
1990	Annaghdown	2–13	Caltra	0–05
1991	Killanin	1–08	St Brendan's	1–05
1992	St Grellan's	3–11	Oranmore-Maree	1–09
1993	Dunmore MacHales	1–07	Kilkerrin/Clonberne	0–06
1994	Clonbur	0–11	St Brendan's	1–05
1995	Naomh Anna, Leitir Móir	0–11	St Michael's	1–05
1996	Oughterard	1–10 (Replay 0–07)	Annaghdown	2–07 (Replay 0–05)
1997	Caltra	2–04	Cortoon Shamrocks	0–09
1998	Mountbellew/Moylough	1–09	Barna	0–07
1999	Cortoon Shamrocks	0–13	An Spidéal	0–10
2000	St Grellan's	1–06 (Replay 1–06)	Corofin	1–06 (Replay 0–08)
2001	Oughterard	1–13	Clifden	0–06
2002	Claregalway	0–08	Naomh Anna, Leitir Móir	0–07
2003	Cortoon Shamrocks	1–11	Clonbur	0–13
2004	Dunmore MacHales	1–9	Caherlistrane	0–11
2005	Caherlistrane	0–12	Clonbur	0–08
2006	Menlough	0–12	St James'	0–11
2007	Moycullen	1–10	Athenry	0–09
2008	St Michael's	0–11	Glenamaddy	0–10
2009	Naomh Anna, Leitir Móir	0–09	St James'	0–07
2010	St James'	0–09	An Spidéal	0–07
2011	Kilconly	2–05	Oughterard	0–07
2012	Carna-Cashel	2–13	Athenry	0–09
2013	Menlough	1–12	Claregalway	2–8
2014	Killanin	0–13	Moycullen	0–10
2015	Moycullen	1–10	Athenry	0–09
2016	Monivea-Abbey	0–09	Kilkerrin/Clonberne	0–08
2017	Claregalway	1–12	Williamstown	0–12
2018	An Spidéal	0–11 (Replay 1–13)	Micheál Breathnach	0–11 (Replay 1–11)
2019	Oughterard	0–14 (Replay 0–19, Pens 5–4)	Micheál Breathnach	0–14 (Replay 1–16, Pens 4–5)
2020	Cortoon Shamrocks	1–10	Kilkerrin-Clonberne	1–08
2021	Naomh Anna, Leitir Móir	2–07	Dunmore MacHales	1–09
2022	Dunmore MacHales	0–08	Kilconly	1–03
2023	Monivea-Abbey	4–18	Caherlistrane	0–08
2024	St Michael's	1–15	Caltra	0–15
2025	Caltra	1–18	An Spidéal	1–16
