= Mannin =

Mannin or Ó Mannin is a surname, and may refer to:

- Ethel Mannin (1900–1984), British novelist and political activist
- James Mannin (died 1779), Irish artist
- Padraig Gearr Ó Mannin (fl.1798), United Irishman

== See also ==
- Manning
- Mannion
- Mannin (journal), academic journal for the promotion of Manx culture
