= Manion =

Manion may refer to:

- Clarence Manion (1896-1979), American conservative and Dean of Notre Dame.
- Daniel Anthony Manion (1942-2024), United States federal judge for the United States Court of Appeals for the Seventh Circuit
- Ed Manion (born 1952), American saxophone player
- Jack Manion (1877–1959), San Francisco Police Sergeant
- John Manion (1931-2010), Canadian civil servant
- Katherine Manion (1867–1956), American physician
- Robert James Manion (1881–1943), leader of the Conservative Party of Canada
- Manyam Zamindar of French Yanam.

== See also ==
- Mannion
- James Mannon (born 1942), American sociologist
