= All-Ireland Senior Club Camogie Championship 1979 =

Camogie championship

Winners
- Champions: Buffers Alley (Wexford) (1st title)
- Captain: Kathleen Tonks

Runners-up
- Runners-up: Athenry (Gal)

The 1979 All-Ireland Senior Club Camogie Championship for the leading clubs in the women's team field sport of camogie was won by Buffers Alley from Wexford, who defeated Athenry from Galway in the final, played at Athenry.

== Arrangements ==
The championship was organised on the traditional provincial system used in Gaelic Games since the 1880s, with Ballyagran and Portglenone winning the championships of the other two provinces. Fiona Cousins, Teresa Hobbs, Dorothy Walsh and Bridie Doran scored Alley’s goal as they dethroned the champions Ballyagran in the semi-final.

== The Final ==
The final was played in miserable weather and underfoot conditions. Agnes Hourigan wrote in the Irish Press:

Buffers Alley were rewarded for their dedication and promotion of the games in the Monamolin-Kilmuckridge district of Wexford when they won the All Ireland club title for the first time at Athenry. They overcame the heavy pitch conditions much more effectively than the lighter local team. Their striking was longer, their combination better and this, allied to their determination, added up to a successful performance.

=== Final stages ===
September 1
Semi-Final

Buffers Alley (Wx)	4-2 – 0-1	Ballyagran

Monamolin

September 8
Semi-Final

Athenry (Gal)	10-7 – 3-2	Portglenone

December 2
Final

Buffers Alley (Wx)	2-6 – 1-2	Athenry (Gal)

Athenry

Buffers Alley	Athenry

Buffers Alley
GK	1	Kathleen Tonks (captain)
FB	2	Margaret Leacy
RWB	3	Geraldine Duggan
CB	4	Deirdre Cousins
LWB	5	Martina Cousins
MF	6	Fiona Cousins
MF	7	Maggie Hearne
MF	8	Elsie Walsh
RWF	9	Caroline O'Leary
CF	10	Dorothy Walsh
LWF	11	Teresa Hobbs
FF	12	Bridie Doran

Athenry
GK	1	Breda Coady
FB	2	Noreen Treacy
RWB	3	Chris Silke
CB	4	Anne Duane
LWB	5	Anne Delaney
MF	6	Olive Coady
MF	7	Madge Hobbins
MF	8	Anne Poniard
RWF	9	M. Sweeney
CF	10	Una Jordan
LWF	11	Anne Morris
FF	12	Teresa Duane

Preceded by All-Ireland Senior Club Camogie Championship 1978	All-Ireland Senior Club Camogie Championship; 1964 – present	Succeeded by All-Ireland Senior Club Camogie Championship 1980
