= Lettermore =

Village in County Galway, Ireland

Lettermore Leitir Móir
- Village
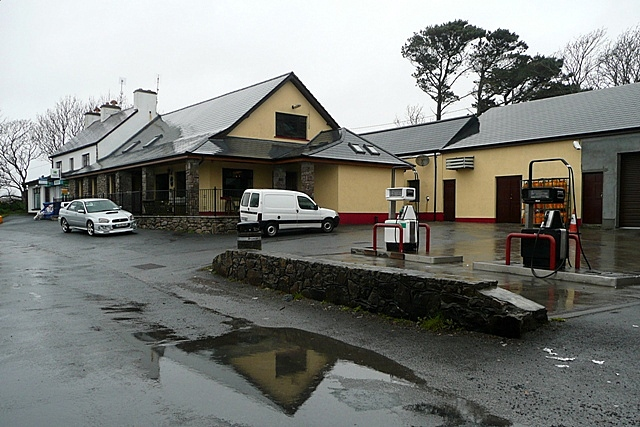
- Tigh Phlunkett and Siopa Phlunkett, public house and shop, Lettermore

- Location in Ireland
- Coordinates: 53°17′20″N 9°39′18″W
- Country: Ireland
- Province: Connacht
- County: County Galway
- Elevation: 1 m (3.3 ft)

Population (2022)
  - Total: 542
- Irish Grid Reference: L887279
- As this is a Gaeltact village, the Irish Leitir Móir is the official name.

Lettermore (Irish: Leitir Móir, lit. 'great rough hillside') is a Gaeltacht village in County Galway, Ireland. It is also the name of the island, linked by road to the mainland, on which the village sits. The main spoken language of the area is Irish.

Lettermore island is in two halves. The eastern half is known as Lettermore, while the western half is known as Lettercallow (Irish: Leitir Calaidh, lit. 'rough hillside by a marshy area').

== Demographics ==
Historical population

Year	Pop.	±%
1841	844	—
1851	661	−21.7%
1861	669	+1.2%
1871	718	+7.3%
1881	890	+24.0%
1891	832	−6.5%
1901	747	−10.2%
1911	801	+7.2%
1926	721	−10.0%

Year	Pop.	±%
1936	677	−6.1%
1946	815	+20.4%
1951	843	+3.4%
1956	820	−2.7%
1961	710	−13.4%
1966	600	−15.5%
1971	604	+0.7%
1979	597	−1.2%
1981	582	−2.5%

Year	Pop.	±%
1986	542	−6.9%
1991	508	−6.3%
1996	503	−1.0%
2002	497	−1.2%
2006	528	+6.2%
2011	548	+3.8%
2016	513	−6.4%
2022	542	+5.7%

Source: Central Statistics Office. "CNA17: Population by Off Shore Island, Sex and Year". CSO.ie. Population of Inhabited Islands Off the Coast (Report). Central Statistics Office. 2023.

== See also ==
- List of towns and villages in the Republic of Ireland
- Darach Ó Catháin
- Gorumna
- CLG Naomh Anna, Leitir Móir
- Fiachra Breathnach
- Seoighe Inish Bearachain
- Peigín Leitir Móir
