= Austin Stacks Camogie Club =

- Founded: 1930
- County: Dublin
- Colours: Blue and gold
- Grounds: Phoenix Park
| Home Colours | Away Colours |

Senior Club Championships
| | All Ireland | Leinster champions | Dublin champions |
|---|---|---|---|
| Camogie: | 2 | 3 | 11 |

Austin Stacks is a camogie club that won the All-Ireland Senior Club Camogie Championship in 1971 and 1972. The club won a further Leinster championship in 1973 and the Dublin Senior Championship on 11 occasions.

== Background ==
The cub was formed in 1930 by Molly Heron, Violet Forde, Molly Tubbert, Rose Kelly, Rita Blake and the Fallon sisters. Molly Fitzgerald-Murphy who trained Stacks teams for many years in Herbert Park, went on to become the Leinster Council and the Dublin County Board chair.

== Other achievements ==
After capturing the Dublin league title from Celtic in 1965, they supplied half of the Dublin inter-county team that won the All Ireland championship, Mary Ryan, Mary Sherlock, Orla Ni Shiochain, Brigid Keenan and Anne McAllister.

== All Ireland titles ==
Goals from Pauline Brennan, Anne Sheehy and Rita Halpin won their first All Ireland club championship in 1971. In 1972 they were strengthened by the arrival of Liz Neary, who had already won three All-Ireland Club medals with St Paul's, and the return of Sligo-born Mary Sherlock, holder of five All-Ireland senior medals. They beat Portglenone by 4–2 to 2–0 in the final.

== Players ==
Notable players included Bríd Reid, Liz Neary, (later to become a Phyllis Campbell and All Ireland winning captain Doreen Rogers. Teresa Walsh (won the trophy for the best individual athlete from a full programme of 38 events at Dublin sports in 1963.

== Colours ==
Austin Stacks wore a navy gym tunic with yellow and green bars around the skirt with a white blouse.
