= All-Ireland Senior Club Camogie Championship 1982 =

Camogie championship

Winners
- Champions: Buffers Alley (Wexford) (3rd title)
- Captain: Elsie Walsh

Runners-up
- Runners-up: Athenry (Gal)

The 1982 All-Ireland Senior Club Camogie Championship for the leading clubs in the women's team field sport of camogie was won by Buffers Alley from Wexford, who defeated Athenry from Galway in the final, played at Birr. It was the second in a record sequence of four in a row won by the club.

== Arrangements ==
The championship was organised on the traditional provincial system used in Gaelic Games since the 1880s, with Killeagh and Portglenone winning the championships of the other two provinces. Due to injury Pat Lenihan, Killeagh's star player, was unable to play in the third successive meeting in three years between Buffers Alley and Killeagh, this time at the semi-final stage. Alley's margin was one point before Dorothy Walsh doubled on a high ball from her sister, Elsie, for a late goal. Portglenone led Athenry by 1–4 to 1–1 at half time in the other semi-final, Teresa Dwane scored two goals early in the second half for Athenry and further goals from Anne Morris, Madge Hobbins and Marion Freaney secured a place in the final. Bronagh McIlvenna was the top scorer for Portglenone with 2–3. Goalkeeper, Sue Dillon, was Portglenone's star.

== The Final ==
The final was played in heavy rain in Carrickmacross. Athenry's two points in the first six minutes were their only scores in the match, as goals from Dorothy Walsh and Kathleen Tonks secured the championship for Buffers Alley.

=== Final stages ===
September 1
Semi-Final

Buffers Alley (Wx)	2-6 – 1-5	Killeagh

Piltown

September 8
Semi-Final

Athenry (Gal)	5-3 – 2-7	Portglenone

Carickmacross

November 14
Final

Buffers Alley (Wx)	3-2 – 0-2	Athenry (Gal)

Birr

Buffers Alley	Athenry

Buffers Alley (Wx):
GK	1	Terri Butler
FB	2	Ann Butler
RWB	3	Geraldine Duggan
CB	4	Margaret Leacy
LWB	5	Stellah Sinnott
MF	6	Fiona Cousins
MF	7	Caroline O'Leary
MF	8	Elsie Walsh (captain)
RWF	9	Kathleen Tonks
CF	10	Gertrude O'Leary
LWF	11	Dorothy Walsh
FF	12	Bridie Doran

Athenry (Gal):
GK	1	Breda Coady
FB	2	Noreen Treacy
RWB	3	Chris Silke
CB	4	Mary Higgins
LWB	5	Ann Connolly
MF	6	Sadie Higgins
MF	7	Olive Molloy
MF	8	Una Jordan
RWF	9	Teresa Duane
CF	10	Madge Hobbins
LWF	11	Anne Morris (captain)
FF	12	Marion Freaney

Preceded by All-Ireland Senior Club Camogie Championship 1981	All-Ireland Senior Club Camogie Championship; 1964 – present	Succeeded by All-Ireland Senior Club Camogie Championship 1983
