= Neddy Lohan =

Neddy Lohan (died in 1820) was Captain of Irish Whiteboys.

== Biography ==
Lohan was a captain of a group of Whiteboys in the Moylough area of County Galway, responsible for rural unrest and violence. They were opposed by Charles O'Rourke (Moylough), a landlord based in Moylough, who arrested suspected members and engaged them in pitched battles.

An ambush was planned by the Whiteboys, upon learning of his route on a given night. However, a young landowner named Brown was travelling the same road that night, and was killed in the belief that he was O'Rourke. He was well-regarded by local people and the Whiteboys.

O'Rourke arrested several men, and upon the information of an informer, Seamus a'Burca, Lohan was sentenced to death for the crime. Prior to sentencing, Lohan was asked if there were any gentlemen on the jury who could give him a character recommendation. Lohan pointed out a Mr. Blake of Garbally. On being asked what he had to say about Lohan, Blake replied, I never saw two dogs fighting, my lord, but Lohan would be the third.

Lohan was taken from Galway Gaol to be hanged, as was custom, at his own door. He sat on his coffin on a cart on the way. At Turloughmore he recognised a friend called O'Shaughnessy and threw him his hat, exclaiming I will you my old hat. This was afterwards called Lohan's Last Will and Testament.

Lohan was hanged in front of a crowd of hundreds at Cooloo Hill, in sight of his house. Two of his sisters were present, and it was stated that they were never in their right mind afterwards. The local historian, Martin Finnerty, recorded that his grandmother witnessed the event.

== See also ==
- Anthony Daly
- James MacHugo
- Padraig Gearr Ó Mannin
- Thunderbolt Gibbons
- Captain Kitt
- Andrew Ó hAughegan
