= Menlough =

Menlough Mionlach
- Village
- Location in Ireland
- Coordinates: 53°25′17″N 8°34′34″W
- Country: Ireland
- Province: Connacht
- County: County Galway
- Irish grid reference: M618413

Menlough (Irish: Mionlach) is a village in the civil parish of Killoscobe in northeast County Galway, Ireland. It is located 35 km from Galway, 27 km from Tuam, 30 km from Ballinasloe, and 20 km from Athenry. Together with nearby Skehana, Menlough is a half-parish within the diocesan parish of Killascobe in the Roman Catholic Archdiocese of Tuam.

== History ==
Evidence of ancient settlement in the area include a number of ringfort, souterrain and castle sites in the townlands of Menlough Eighter and Menlough Oughter.

Historically, the area was a stronghold of the O'Mannion clan, and the ruin of a former O'Mannion castle is located in the fields behind the grotto in Menlough village. Another O'Mannion castle in the parish, known as Garbally Castle, is better known as there are more extensive ruins. It is visible on the road from Galway to Menlough as it passes through Skehana.

The Ffrench family, one of the 14 Tribes of Galway, were local landowners by the 17th century. The Catholic church of St Marys, in the parish of Menlough-Skehana (Killascobe), was constructed in the mid-19th century on land granted by the Ffrench family.

Beside the church is a former Royal Irish Constabulary (RIC) barracks. Damaged by fire in 1922, during the War of Independence, it later became a Garda station and is now a private house. A monument to the Menlough battalion of the old IRA was erected in the village in the 1980s.

== Amenities ==
There are three pubs in the parish; one is located in Menlough village, one in the townland of Guilka and one in Skehana. There is also a shop.

The parish has two national schools. These are at Garbally (next to the castle) and in Menlough village. The latter school, Menlough National School (also known as Scoil Mhuire Naofa) is a co-educational (mixed) primary school, which had 77 pupils as of November 2009.

== Sport ==
Menlough GAA is the local Gaelic Athletic Association club and participates in the Galway Football Championship. The club's pitch is located outside the village on the approaches from Galway city. The facility has a clubhouse, dressing rooms and stand, and was developed in the early 1990s.

== Notable people ==
- Padraig Gearr Ó Mannin (fl. 1798), member of the United Irishmen, born Menlough

== See also ==
- List of towns and villages in Ireland
