= 1993 Wexford Senior Hurling Championship =

Annual hurling competition season

- Champions: Cloughbawn (3rd title)
- Runners-up: Rapparees

The 1993 Wexford Senior Hurling Championship was the 83rd completed staging of the Wexford Senior Hurling Championship since its establishment by the Wexford County Board in 1889.

Buffers Alley entered the championship as the defending champions, however, they were beaten by Rapparees in the semi-finals.

The final, a replay, was played on 24 October 1994 at Wexford Park, between Cloughbawn and Rapparees, in what was their first ever meeting in the final. Cloughbawn won the match by 2–10 to 2–07 to claim their third championship title overall and a first title in 42 years.

== Results ==
=== Final ===
10 October 1993 Final	Cloughbawn	1-08 - 1-08	Rapparees	Wexford Park
	B Kehoe 0-6, P Courtney 1-0, C McBride 0-1, A Fenlon 0-1.		J Fleming 1-1, P Carton 0-3, S Flood 0-1, J O'Connor 0-1, L Murphy 0-1, T Harrington 0-1.

=== Final replay ===
24 October 1993 Final replay	Cloughbawn	2-10 - 2-07	Rapparees	Wexford Park
	T Harrington 1-6, L Murphy 1-2, J Fleming 0-1, S Flood 0-1.		B Kehoe 1-3, R Furlong 1-1, C McBride 0-2, B Dwyer 0-1.
