= Brian O'Donoghue =

Irish Gaelic footballer

Personal information
- Native name: Brían Ó Donnchú (Irish)
- Born: 10 September 1983 (age 43) Galway, Ireland
- Occupation: Engineer
- Height: 1.93 m (6 ft 4 in)

Sport
- Sport: Gaelic Football
- Position: Goalkeeper
Club
- Years: Club
- 2001-: Claregalway
Inter-county
Years	County	Apps (scores)
2002-2006, 2015-2017	Galway	48 (0-0)
Inter-county titles
- Connacht titles: 4

Brian O'Donoghue (born 10 September 1983, in Galway) was an inter-county Gaelic football goalkeeper from Galway who plays for Claregalway and Galway,

O'Donoghue made his senior debut for Galway in June 2003, against Leitrim. He has battled with Alan Keane for the number one position in Galway's team.

== Soccer ==
O'Donoghue also plays for Mervue United in the League of Ireland First Division.
