= All-Ireland Senior Club Camogie Championship 1971 =

Camogie championship

Winners
- Champions: Austin Stacks (Dublin) (1st title)
- Captain: Mary Ryan

Runners-up
- Runners-up: Thurles (Tip)

The 1971 All-Ireland Senior Club Camogie Championship for the leading clubs in the women's team field sport of camogie was by Austin Stacks from Dublin, who defeated Thurles from Tipperary in the final, played at Croke Park.

== Arrangements ==
The championship was organised on the traditional provincial system used in Gaelic Games since the 1880s, with Portglenone and Ballinasloe winning the championships of the other two provinces.

== The Final ==
Pauline Brennan and Anne Sheehy got two goals each and Rita Halpin a fifth in Austin Stacks 12-point victory in the final. Stacks led 3-2 to 1-1 at half-time.

Agnes Hourigan wrote in the Irish Press:

The winners were a better trained side, showing a finer understanding and better teamwork, though the Tipperary girls had some fine strikers, but they were anxious to lift the ball even when a ground strike would have been m ore effective. The Tipperary girls had their best period just after the interval and it looked as if they were getting on top when they goaled to cut the margin to four points, but Austin Stacks recovered and, lasting better, they dominated the closing stages to win comfortably.

=== Provincial stages ===
December 5
Connacht

Ballinasloe (Galway)	bt	Breaffy (Mayo)

January 16, 1972
Leinster

Austin Stacks (Dublin)	4-2 – 4-1	St Paul’s (Kilkenny)

Naas

November 28
Munster

Thurles (Tipperary)	2-5 – 0-1	South Presentation (Cork)

Thurles

November 28
Ulster

Portglenone (Antrim)	bt	Clanna Gael (Armagh)

Lurgan

=== Final stages ===
September 1
Semi-Final

Austin Stacks (Dublin)	5-2 – 1-0	Portglenone (Antrim)

Randalstown

September 8
Semi-Final

Thurles (Tipperary)	1-3 – 1-1	Ballinasloe (Galway)

Thurles

March 19, 1972
Final

Austin Stacks (Dublin)	5-4 – 2-1	Thurles (Tipperary)

Croke Park

Austin Stacks	Thurles

Austin Stacks (Du):
GK	1	Sheila Murray
FB	2	Mary Ryan (captain)
RWB	3	Bríd Keenan
CB	4	Vera Sullivan
LWB	5	Fiona Murray
MF	6	Sheila McEvoy
MF	7	Lucy McEvoy
MF	8	Orla Ní Síocháin
RWF	9	Pauline Brennan
CF	10	Anne Sheehy
LWF	11	Rita Halpin
FF	12	Dympna Caldwell

Thurles (Tip)
GK	1	Sally Long
FB	2	Mary Graham
RWB	3	Margaret Murphy
CB	4	Bernie O'Dowd (captain)
LWB	5	Alice Perry
MF	6	Beatrice Lawrence
MF	7	Ann Ralph
MF	8	Kit Boland
RWF	9	Marion Moynihan
CF	10	Kay Bermingham
LWF	11	Margo Loughnane
FF	12	Marion Troy

Preceded by All-Ireland Senior Club Camogie Championship 1970	All-Ireland Senior Club Camogie Championship; 1964 – present	Succeeded by All-Ireland Senior Club Camogie Championship 1972
