= Darach Ó Catháin =

- Born: Darach Ó Catháin; 30 September 1922; Maimin, Lettermore, Connemara, Ireland
- Died: 29 September 1987 (aged 64) Leeds, West Yorkshire, England
- Genres: Sean-nós
- Occupations: Farmer, writer, composer
- Label: Gael-Linn Records

Darach Ó Catháin (30 September 1922 – 29 September 1987) was an Irish sean-nós singer. Along with his fellow Connemara-native, Seosamh Ó hÉanaí, he was one of the most prominent sean-nós singers of his day and was praised by Seán Ó Riada. Ó Catháin left Ireland for work and set down in Leeds, West Yorkshire where he lived out the rest of his life.

== Early life ==
Ó Catháin was born on 30 September 1922 at Maimin, Lettermore, Connemara seventh in a family of twelve children. In the English-language records of birth he is noted down as Dudley Keane, son of Coleman Keane and Monica Faherty. In 1935 his family moved to new government created Gaeltacht of Ráth Chairn, in County Meath. His love of singing and many of his songs were learned from his mother.

== Career ==
By the late 1950s he was established as one of the finest sean-nós singers in the country. In the early 60s Seán Ó Riada had begun to broadcast a series of radio programmes, Reacaireacht an Riadaigh, on RTÉ Radio 1. These programmes were to transform the traditional music. Darach Ó Catháin was the singer in those programmes. In 1962 a commercial recording was issued. Out of all of this came Ceoltóirí Cualann and eventually The Chieftains. But in the meantime, Ó Catháin disappeared; he fell in love and married when he was 19.

While he was performing with O Riada he was also working as a labourer on the building sites of London and the north of England. By 1963 he'd become convinced his family's future was in Leeds. In that year his wife, Bríd, sold the family home and moved to Yorkshire. In the intervening years Ó Catháin released another recording, Traditional Irish Unaccompanied Singing (1975). It cemented his reputation as a singer. Indeed, for many it established him as the greatest of the sean-nós singers. Darach Ó Catháin became an iconic figure within the Irish music tradition.

He won the "Best sean-nós singer" in Ireland in 1967 at the Oireachtas competitions and won the Ó'Riada Trophy.

== Personal life ==
When the Kane family sold their family home and moved to Leeds they were beginning an experiment that would not prove a total success but the Kanes are still in Leeds.

Dudley Kane – Darach Ó Catháin – is here in Leeds (RTÉ) follows that journey through the eyes of three of Darach's seven children and their mother, Bríd. When the family made that journey the eldest daughter, Barbara, was 16 and already in Boston (Massachusetts). She was later to rejoin her family. Bridie (15) and Monica (9) recall their early days in Leeds, their sense of dislocation – at loss in a language they had little knowledge of and the love they had for their father and his musical inheritance.

== Documentary ==
He was also the subject of a major television documentary Cérbh É? Darach Ó Catháin on TG4, first broadcast in November 2009. In this programme, one of a series in which major figures in contemporary traditional music, profile and pay homage to a master of their craft from a bygone age, Iarla Ó Lionáird traced the life and legacy of Ó Catháin.

In the documentary Darach Ó Catháin said, "When you've music in you, you're hearing music always."

== See also ==
- List of traditional Irish singers
