= Thunderbolt Gibbons =

Thunderbolt Gibbons, was the moniker of a Whiteboys captain in Ireland in the early nineteenth century.

== Background ==
Gibbons was a native of Barnaderg and became the leader of the Whiteboy movement in the area. He was noted for his speed, which caused him to be popularly called 'Thunderbolt', and in relation to his many escapes from arrest.

== Tiaquin and transportation ==
On the same night as a Whiteboy meeting at Tyquin, Athenry, a local 'Big House' was fired, and Gibbons was obliged to go on the run. He was forced to seek refuge in Connemara, but was eventually arrested. He was subsequently sentenced to be executed, but his sister entreated Mr. Bodkin of Annagh to intercede (Finnerty states that Bodkin was "vested with the power of king's prerogative and that meant that he could reprieve a condemned man from the gallows.") While Bodkin's intercession did not result in Gibbons's release, his sentence was reduced to transportation to Australia.

== Later life ==
Some years later, Gibbons was working near the governor's mansion when he saw an Australian Aborigine make off into the bush, having seized the governor's only child. After an epic chase, Thunderbolt succeeded in rescuing the child. According to Finerty "Thunderbolt's release was secured as a result, and with a well-lined wallet, he sailed for the United States where he was joined and greeted by comrades and exiles in general to enter on a career of success until his death when he died a wealthy man."

== See also ==
- Neddy Lohan
- Captain Kitt
- Anthony Daly (Whiteboy)
- Clann Taidg
