= Portglenone =

Village in County Antrim, Northern Ireland

Coordinates: 54.873°N 6.474°W

Portglenone: Irish: Port Chluain Eoghain
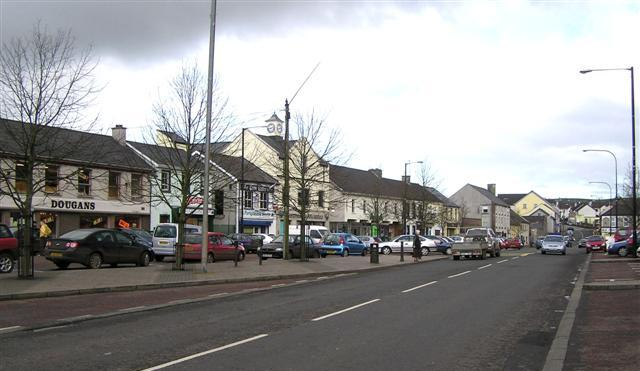
- Portglenone's main street

- Location within Northern Ireland
- Population: 1,174 (2011 Census)
- District: Mid and East Antrim
- County: County Antrim
- Country: Northern Ireland
- Sovereign state: United Kingdom
- Post town: BALLYMENA
- Postcode district: BT44
- Dialling code: 028
- UK Parliament: North Antrim
- NI Assembly: North Antrim

Portglenone (from Irish: Port Chluain Eoghain [ˈpˠɔɾˠt̪ˠ ˌxlˠuənʲ ˈoːənʲ], meaning 'landing place of Eoghan's meadow') is a village and civil parish in County Antrim, Northern Ireland. It lies 8.5 miles (14 km) west of Ballymena. It had a population of 1,174 people in the 2011 Census. Portglenone is beside the smaller village of Glenone (in County Londonderry), from which it is separated by the River Bann.

== History ==
In 1197, a castle was built in the area for Norman invader John de Courcy.

Much of Portglenone village was laid-out in the 17th century. A number of the area's churches, including Portglenone's Church of Ireland parish church, date to the 18th century.

Portglenone House, a former Georgian mansion in the village, was built c. 1808. Now known as Portglenone Abbey, or Our Lady of Bethlehem Cistercian Monastery, the house was purchased by the Cistercian order in the 20th century for use as a monastery. In the 1960s, a new monastery building was built. Designed by Padraig Ó Muireadhaigh, the new building has won several architectural awards.

== Places of interest ==
=== Portglenone Forest ===
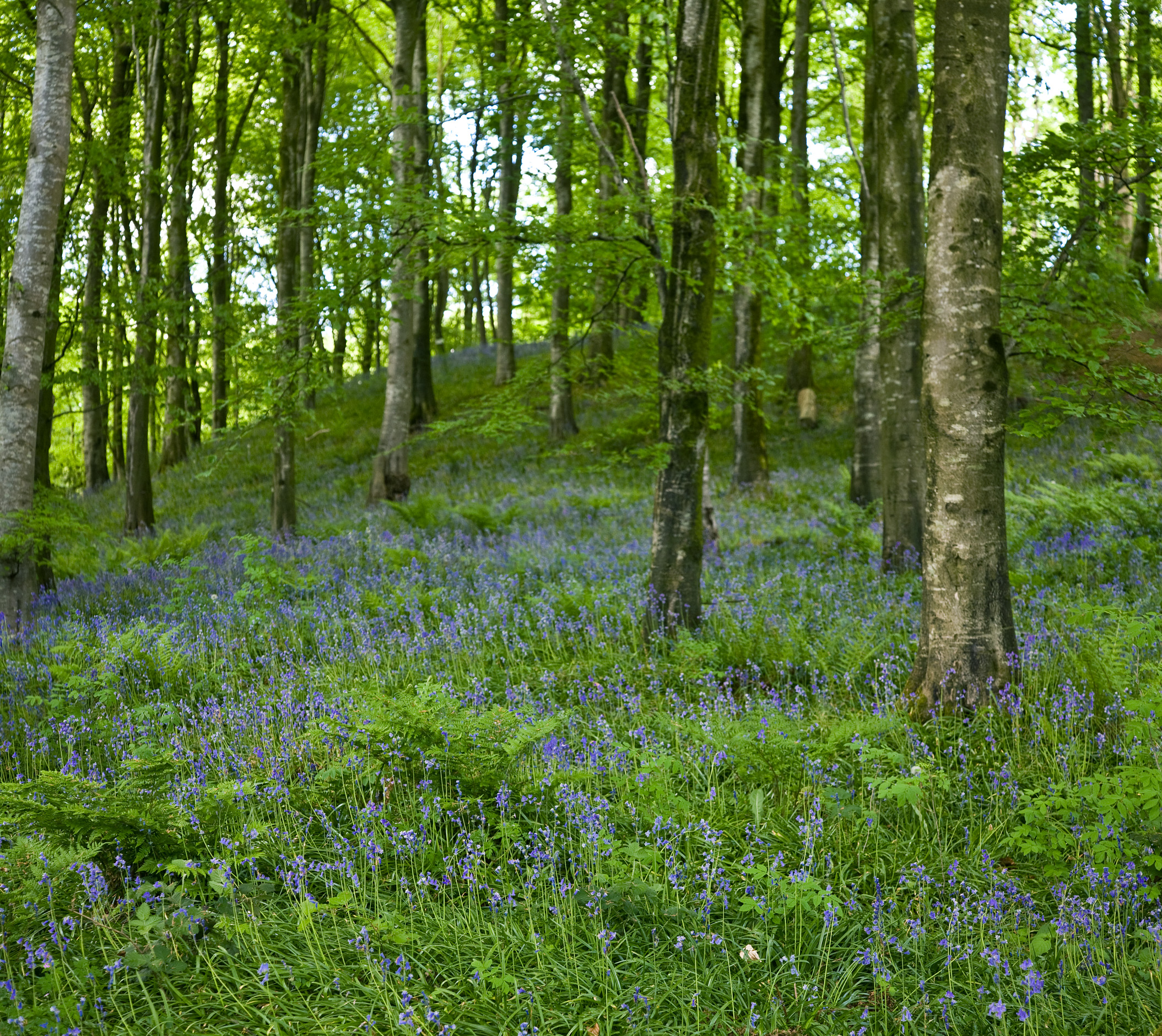
Bluebells in Portglenone Forest

Portglenone Forest Park, just outside the village, is classified as an 'ancient woodland'. It contains several marked nature trails and the River Bann flows through the forest. There is also a memorial to the United States servicemen stationed in the area during World War II. The foundations of several Nissen huts can still be seen throughout the wood.

=== Gig 'n The Bann festival ===
The Gig 'n the Bann is a local cross-community music and dance festival in Portglenone. It takes its name from the River Bann and has been held every year since 1999. Performers at previous festivals have included Paul McSherry and former members of Déanta.

== Demography ==
=== 2011 census ===
On census day in 2011, Portglenone had a population of 1,174 people (498 households) in the 2011 census.

46.8% were from a Catholic background and 50.6% were from a Protestant background.

=== 2001 census ===
Portglenone is classified as a village by the NISRA. On census day in 2001, there were 1,219 people living in Portglenone. Of these:

- 26.3% were aged under 16 years and 19.7% were aged 60 and over
- 47.9% of the population were male and 52.1% were female
- 47.1% were from a Catholic background and 52.6% were from a Protestant background
- 2.6% of people aged 16–74 were unemployed.

== Climate ==
Climate data for Portglenone (1991–2020)
| Month | Jan | Feb | Mar | Apr | May | Jun | Jul | Aug | Sep | Oct | Nov | Dec | Year |
|---|---|---|---|---|---|---|---|---|---|---|---|---|---|
| Record high °C (°F) | 14.6 (58.3) | 14.8 (58.6) | 19.4 (66.9) | 22.2 (72.0) | 24.6 (76.3) | 29.1 (84.4) | 29.7 (85.5) | 28.0 (82.4) | 25.5 (77.9) | 19.6 (67.3) | 17.0 (62.6) | 14.7 (58.5) | 29.7 (85.5) |
| Mean daily maximum °C (°F) | 7.2 (45.0) | 7.9 (46.2) | 9.6 (49.3) | 12.1 (53.8) | 14.9 (58.8) | 17.2 (63.0) | 18.7 (65.7) | 18.4 (65.1) | 16.5 (61.7) | 13.0 (55.4) | 9.7 (49.5) | 7.5 (45.5) | 12.7 (54.9) |
| Daily mean °C (°F) | 4.6 (40.3) | 4.9 (40.8) | 6.3 (43.3) | 8.3 (46.9) | 10.8 (51.4) | 13.3 (55.9) | 15.0 (59.0) | 14.8 (58.6) | 13.0 (55.4) | 9.9 (49.8) | 6.9 (44.4) | 4.9 (40.8) | 9.4 (48.9) |
| Mean daily minimum °C (°F) | 2.1 (35.8) | 1.9 (35.4) | 2.9 (37.2) | 4.6 (40.3) | 6.7 (44.1) | 9.4 (48.9) | 11.3 (52.3) | 11.2 (52.2) | 9.5 (49.1) | 6.9 (44.4) | 4.1 (39.4) | 2.3 (36.1) | 6.1 (43.0) |
| Record low °C (°F) | −10.7 (12.7) | −9.3 (15.3) | −6.8 (19.8) | −4.8 (23.4) | −1.7 (28.9) | 2.2 (36.0) | 4.9 (40.8) | 4.2 (39.6) | 0.7 (33.3) | −2.4 (27.7) | −7.5 (18.5) | −13.4 (7.9) | −13.4 (7.9) |
| Average precipitation mm (inches) | 89.2 (3.51) | 69.5 (2.74) | 69.4 (2.73) | 62.6 (2.46) | 64.8 (2.55) | 76.1 (3.00) | 85.2 (3.35) | 91.5 (3.60) | 75.4 (2.97) | 98.3 (3.87) | 98.5 (3.88) | 93.5 (3.68) | 974.0 (38.35) |
| Average precipitation days (≥ 1.0 mm) | 16.4 | 14.2 | 13.9 | 12.6 | 12.9 | 12.9 | 14.9 | 14.7 | 13.3 | 15.6 | 16.8 | 16.2 | 174.4 |
Source 1: Met Office
Source 2: Starlings Roost Weather

== Sport ==
Portglenone's camogie club won the Ulster senior club championship in 1971, 1972, 1973, 1974, 1977, 1978, 1979, 1982 and 1992. Notable players include Mairead McAtamney.

== Notable people ==
- Bernard Diamond, recipient of the Victoria Cross
- Emma Kearney, actress (Coronation Street, Emmerdale, Mr. Bhatti on Chutti)
- Wilson Sibbett (1948–2024), physicist known for his pioneering work on ultrashort pulse lasers and photonics, Wardlaw Professor of Physics at the University of St Andrews
- Canon Charles O'Neill (1887–1963), author of a version of the song The Foggy Dew, was born in Portglenone.

== See also ==
- List of civil parishes of County Antrim
- List of towns and villages in Northern Ireland
