= CLG Naomh Anna, Leitir Móir =

Gaelic football club in County Galway, Ireland

- Founded: 1964
- County: Galway
- Colours: Black & amber
- Grounds: Páirc a'Mháimín, Leitir Móir
- Coordinates: 53°15′26.20″N 9°36′03.46″W

Playing kits
Standard colours

CLG Naomh Anna, Leitir Móir is a Gaelic football club based in the Gaeltacht area of Leitir Móir, County Galway, Ireland. It is a member of the Galway GAA branch of the Gaelic Athletic Association. The club is concerned with the sport of football. Notable former players include Fiachra Breathnach, and Antoine 'Toto' Ó Griofa, former members of the Galway county team panel.

In 2009-2010 the club enjoyed the most successful year in their history, capturing the Galway Intermediate Football Championship and also the Connacht Intermediate Club Championship title. Naomh Anna, Leitir Móir eventually lost out to Cookstown Fr. Rock's from Tyrone in the All-Ireland series on 24 January 2010 at Pearse Park, Longford.

On 13 November 2021, the club won the Galway Intermediate Football Championship, defeating Dunmore in the final at Pearse Stadium in Salthill.

== Notable players ==
- Fiachra Breathnach

== Honours ==
- Connacht Intermediate Club Football Championship (1): 2010
- Galway Intermediate Football Championship (3): 1995, 2009, 2021
- Galway Intermediate Football League (West) (2): 1993, 2001
- Galway Intermediate Football Shield (West) (3): 1999, 2002, 2006
- Comórtas Peile na Gaeltachta Champions (Junior) (1): 1987
