= Captain Kitt =

Captain Kitt, Irish Whiteboys captain, fl. 1820.

== Background ==
Kitt was a native of the parish of Ballymacward and was leader of the Whiteboys in the area. He usually convened the meetings, which were called The Ballinafad, held at his home in Corskeaghdaly. Membership dues were ten pence a year, and Kitt was known to enforce collection.

He had a reputation as a very stern disciplinarian, but it was acknowledged that this was at a time when agitation and evictions had made the county very disturbed.

== Hampstead attack ==
One of his most famous exploits was an attack on Hampstead House while the owner was entertaining a large group of fellow land-lords. According to Martin Finnerty:

... in the midst of their carousing the house was attacked by ribbonmen under the command of Capt. Kitt. There can be no doubt but the attackers were in possession of heavy fire arms [because] until the big house was levelled by the Land Commission, the window stool of an upper window revealed the strength to some extent of the attackers. This stone stool was made into splinters in the middle and it was evident that nothing less than light cannon was in use. The occupants of the house returned the fire and the attackers were forced to retreat and some accounts reveal with the loss of one man.

== Later life ==
Kitt's ultimate fate seems to be unknown. Kitt is a very rare surname, found only in parts of east Galway. Latter-day bearers of the name include politicians Michael F. Kitt, Snr (1914–1974) and Tony Kett (1951–2009). The Dublin-born singer-songwriter David Kitt (born 1975) is the grandson of Michael F. Kitt, Snr.

== See also ==
- Neddy Lohan
- Thunderbolt Gibbons
- Anthony Daly (Whiteboy)
- Clann Taidg
