= Bernard Diamond (VC) =

Irish recipient of the Victoria Cross

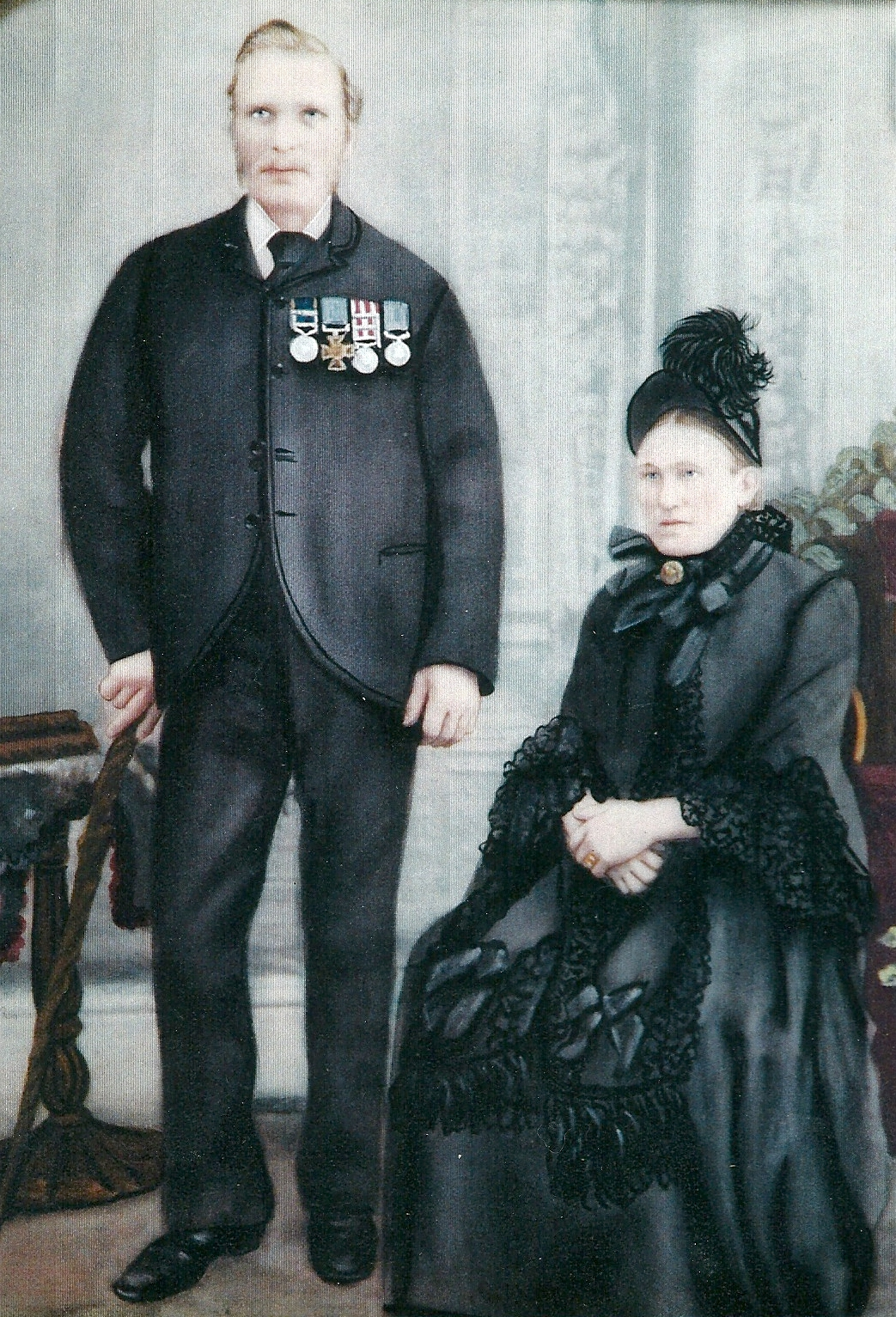
- Born: January 1827; Portglenone, County Antrim
- Died: 24 January 1892 (aged 64–65); Masterton, New Zealand
- Burial place: Masterton Cemetery
- Military career
- Allegiance: United Kingdom
- Branch: Bengal Army
- Rank: Sergeant
- Unit: Bengal Horse Artillery
- Conflicts: Second Anglo-Sikh War; Indian Mutiny
- Awards: Victoria Cross

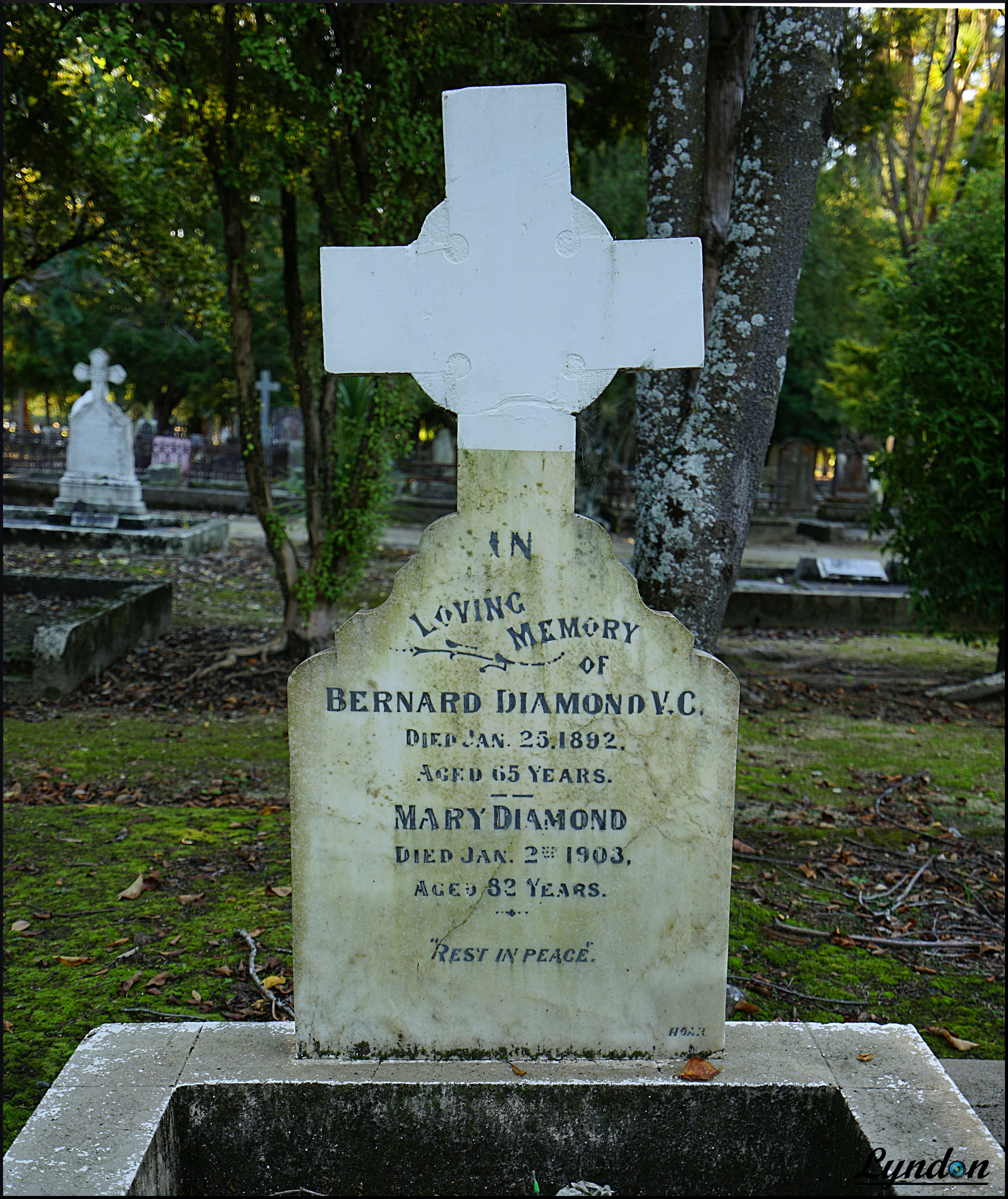
Bernard Diamond's grave site in Masterton

Bernard Diamond VC (January 1827 – 24 January 1892) in Portglenone, County Antrim, Ireland was a recipient of the Victoria Cross, the highest and most prestigious award for gallantry in the face of the enemy that can be awarded to British and Commonwealth forces.

== Details ==
He was approximately 30 years old, and a sergeant in the Bengal Horse Artillery, Bengal Army during the Indian Mutiny when the following deed took place on 28 September 1857 at Bolandshahr, India for which he and Gunner Richard Fitzgerald was awarded the Victoria Cross:

For an act of valour performed in action against the rebels and mutineers at Boolundshur, on the 28th September, 1857, when these two soldiers evinced the most determined bravery in working their gun under a very heavy fire of musketry, whereby they cleared the road of the enemy, after every other man belonging to it had been either killed or disabled by wounds. (Despatch of Major Turner, Bengal Horse Artillery, dated Boolundshur, 2 October 1857.)

== Further information ==
He died in Masterton, New Zealand on 24 January 1892 after emigrating, and was buried at the Archer Street Cemetery.

== The medal ==
His Victoria Cross is displayed at the QEII Army Memorial Museum in Waiouru, New Zealand.
