= Michael Crimmins =

Irish sportsperson

Personal information
- Native name: Mícheál Mac Cruimein (Irish)
- Born: 1974 (age 51–52) Birr, County Offaly

Sport
- Sport: Hurling
- Position: Goalkeeper and Striker
Club
- Years: Club
- 1994-present: Athenry
Club titles
- Galway titles: 7
- Leinster titles: 7
- All-Ireland Titles: 3
Inter-county
Years	County	Apps (scores)
1999-2002	Galway	8 (0-00)
Inter-county titles
- Leinster titles: 0
- All-Irelands: 0 World Cup = 2
- NHL: 1
- All Stars: 0

Michael Crimmins (born 1974 in Birr, County Offaly) is an Irish sportsperson. He plays hurling with his local club Athenry and was a member of the Galway senior inter-county team from 1999 until 2002.
