= All-Ireland Senior Club Camogie Championship 1977 =

Camogie championship

Winners
- Champions: Athenry (Galway) (1st title)
- Captain: Teresa Duane

Runners-up
- Runners-up: Portglenone (Ant)

The 1977 All-Ireland Senior Club Camogie Championship for the leading clubs in the women's team field sport of camogie was won by Athenry from Galway, who defeated Portglenone from Antrim in the final, played at Athenry.

== Arrangements ==
The championship was organised on the traditional provincial system used in Gaelic Games since the 1880s, with Ballyagran defeating Drom & Inch and Éire Óg from Cork to win the Munster championship and St Paul’s winning the Leinster championship. Athenry drew their strength from the successful local Presentation Convent team, and were Connacht champions for the third year in succession.

== The Final ==
Athenry’s overwhelming victory was certain from the start of the final and they led 5-4 to 0-1 at half-time and they maintain control in the second half against the breeze. Theresa Duane and Anne Morris scored four goals each. Agnes Hourigan wrote in the Irish Press:

Excellent defensive work by Noreen Tracey, Anne Duane and Anne Delaney kept the Ulster champions at bay throughout and the winners forwards continued to score virtually at will. Particularly prominent were Olive Coady on the wing and Midge Pionard at centrefield.

=== Final stages ===
March 5
Semi-Final

Athenry (Gal)	3-3 – 2-3	Ballyagran

September 8
Semi-Final

Portglenone (Ant)	1-4 – 0-3	St Paul’s

March 19, 1978
Final

Athenry (Gal)	10-5 – 1-1	Portglenone (Ant)

Athenry

Athenry	Portglenone

Athenry (Gal):
GK	1	Breda Coady
FB	2	Noreen Treacy
RWB	3	Gretta O'Brien
CB	4	Ann Duane
LWB	5	Anne Delaney
MF	6	Olive Coady
MF	7	Midge Poniard
MF	8	Madge Hobbins
RWF	9	Marion Freaney
CF	10	Mary Daly
LWF	11	Anne Morris
FF	12	Teresa Duane

Portglenone (Ant):
GK	1	Sue Dillon
FB	2	Ann Kelly
RWB	3	Enda Webb
CB	4	Jackie McAtamney
LWB	5	Vera McAleese
MF	6	Mairéad McAtamney
MF	7	Siobhán McAtamney
MF	8	Claire McIlvenna
RWF	9	Ann Marie O'Neill
CF	10	Sheena McAtamney
LWF	11	Briege Kelly
FF	12	Patricia O'Doherty

Preceded by All-Ireland Senior Club Camogie Championship 1976	All-Ireland Senior Club Camogie Championship; 1964 – present	Succeeded by All-Ireland Senior Club Camogie Championship 1978
