= Garbally Castle =

Tower house in County Galway, Ireland

Coordinates: 53.4065°N 8.6362°W

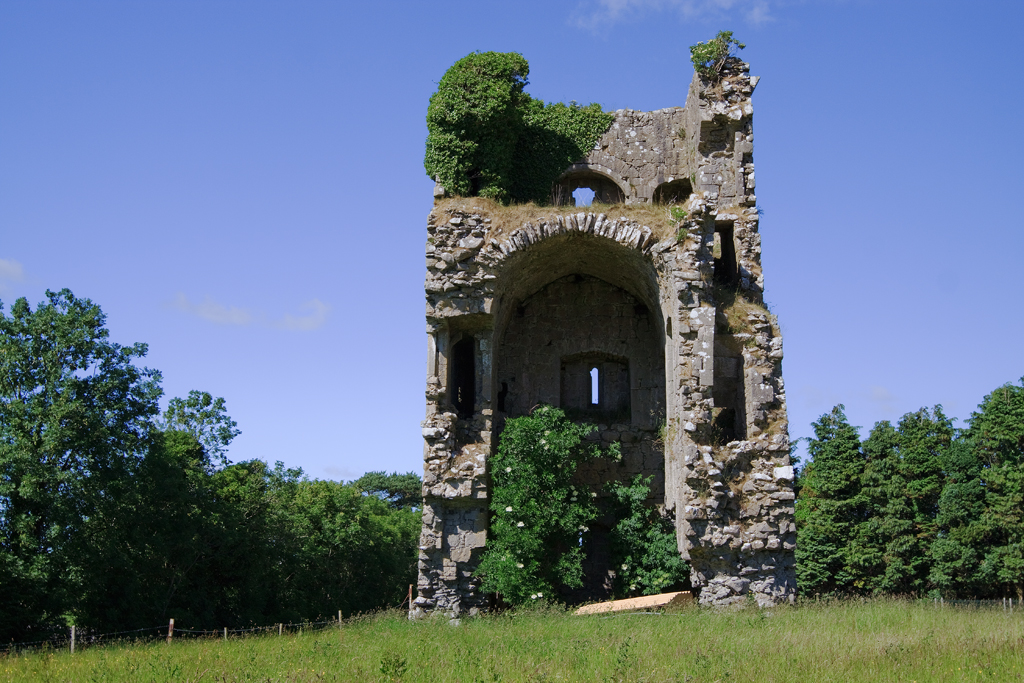
Ruin of Garbally Castle, near Skehanagh and Colmanstown

Garbally castle is a late medieval tower house located in the parish of Skehana, County Galway.

== Location ==
Garbally Castle is the dominant feature of the townland of Garbally in the parish of Skehana and sits at the junction of the R338 and the access road to St Kerrils Abbey. The Garbally townland is small, covering just over 74 acres (30 ha) and is only ever known to have been occupied by two households. The name is anglicised from the Irish Garbh Bhaile which means "rough enclosure" or "rough townland".

== History ==
Garbally Castle was built in 1499 by Malachy O'Kelly as a tower house, the Kelly clan being renowned in Ireland at this time as builders of fortresses. The castle was destroyed by MacWilliam De Burgo in 1504, he also destroyed two other O'Kelly fortresses at this time at Monivea and Gallagh. However, the extent of the destruction inflicted is uncertain as in 1832 Samuel Lewis noted that Garbally castle was "partially destroyed by Cromwell" along with the nearby castle in the 17th century. After this time the lands were owned by three Roman Catholic landowners, two of the named Patrick Ffrench, but by the Griffiths Valuation of Tenements in the early 1850s, Robert French, a diplomat who served as Secretary to the British Embassy in St. Petersburg and Vienna was the owner of the entire townland. Garbally was at this time leased to the Blake family and occupied by one Thomas Blake who was the son of the M.P., Patrick Blake. Patrick Blake was a participant in the trial of Neddy Lohan.

== The ruins ==
Garbally Castle is a ruin which has its interiors exposed. The castle is constructed as a three-storey tower around square floorplan. The most damaged side is on the southwest and here the thick side walls can be seen, with their mural passages, and there is a vaulted ceiling on the first floor. There is a pointed arch doorway on the southeastern wall which is overlooked by a gun loop in the south jamb and there is also a murder-hole. The parapets of the northeast and southeast walls retain the corbels which supported the machicolations. There are some windows in the north eastern wall, with three of them being simple slits. This is the side where a handball court has been created, several Irish monuments have been damaged by handball courts being constructed. Within the handball court there is a plaque which is a memorial to Ellen Mannion who died here in 1850, aged 25, with her husband Michael McDermott and their two children who sheltered in the ruined castle following from their eviction from their house.
