= Claregalway CLG =

Gaelic football club in County Galway, Ireland

Claregalway GAA
- Baile Chláir
- Founded: 1968
- County: Galway
- Nickname: The Balchies
- Colours
- Grounds: Claregalway GAA Grounds, Lakeview
- Coordinates: 53°20′16.84″N 8°56′18.54″W

Playing kits
Standard colours

Senior Club Championships
	All Ireland	Connacht champions	Galway champions
Football:	0	0	0

Claregalway GAA is a Gaelic football club based in Claregalway, County Galway, Ireland. It is a member of the Galway GAA branch of the Gaelic Athletic Association. Underage teams up to U-16's play in the Galway league and championships, while the Minor, Under-21 and Senior teams compete in all further levels.

Although not a traditional stronghold of football, the success of the Galway county teams of the 1950s and 1960s stimulated the imagination of footballs locally. It was not long after Galway's "Three In a Row" that the football club was founded in 1968.

Notable players include Brian O'Donoghue and Dan Cummins. Danny and Adrian are members of the county panel. Current Cork panellist Paddy Moran is a former underage star with the club.

== Notable players ==
- Dan Cummins
- Jack Glynn: 2022 GAA/GPA Young Footballer of the Year
- James Nallen
- Brian O'Donoghue

== Honours ==
- Galway Intermediate Football Championship: (2)
  - 2002, 2017
- Galway Junior Football Championship: (4)
  - 1986, 1993, 1998, 2007
- Galway Under-21 A Football Championship
  - 2019
- Galway Under-21 B Football Championship
  - 2002
