= Skehana =

Skehana An Sceachánach
- Townland
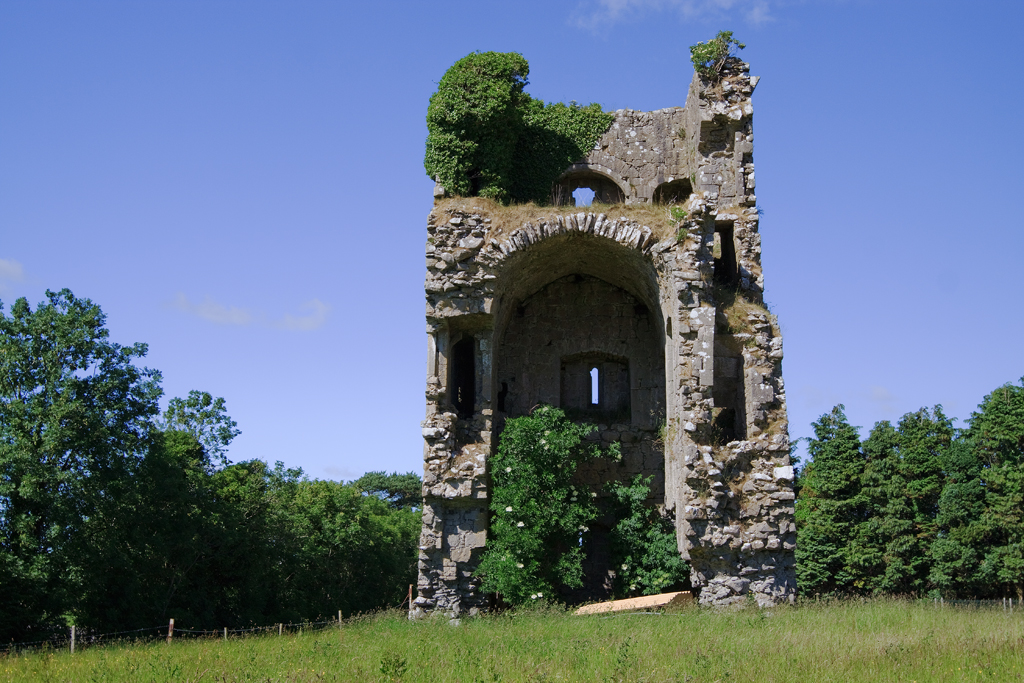
- The ruins of Garbally Castle are 200 m from Skehana Community Center

- Location in Ireland
- Coordinates: 53°25′03″N 8°38′09″W
- Country: Ireland
- Province: Connacht
- County: County Galway
- Time zone: UTC+0 (WET)
  - Summer (DST): UTC-1 (IST (WEST))
- Irish grid reference: M578400

Skehana or Skehanagh (Irish: An Sceachánach) is a small village and townland in County Galway, Ireland. The name Skehana derives from the Irish Sceith eánach meaning "place of the whitethorn".

Together with nearby Menlough, Skehana is a half-parish within the diocesan parish of Killascobe in the Roman Catholic Archdiocese of Tuam. The parish church in Skehana was built c. 1861 and is included on the Record of Protected Structures maintained by Galway County Council.

The local Gaelic Athletic Association club, Skehana Hurling Club, fields hurling teams at underage and adult Junior A grades.

The ruins of an Anglo-Norman tower house, Garbally Castle, are located immediately to the west of the local national school.

== See also ==
- List of towns and villages in Ireland
