= Willie Doran =

Irish sportsperson

Personal information
- Born: Boolavogue, County Wexford

Sport
- Sport: Hurling
- Position: Half-Forward
Club
- Years: Club
- Buffer's Alley
Inter-county
- Years: County
- 2003 - 2011: Wexford
Inter-county titles
- Leinster titles: 1

William Doran (born 1982 in Boolavogue, County Wexford) is an Irish sportsperson. He played hurling with his local club Buffer's Alley and was a member of the Wexford senior hurling team. He participated in Wexford's 2008 hurling championship campaign.

His uncle Tony and father Colm also played hurling with the Wexford senior hurling team.
