= Portglenone Parish Church =

Church in County Antrim, Northern Ireland

Portglenone Parish Church is the Church of Ireland parish church of Portglenone, County Antrim, Northern Ireland.

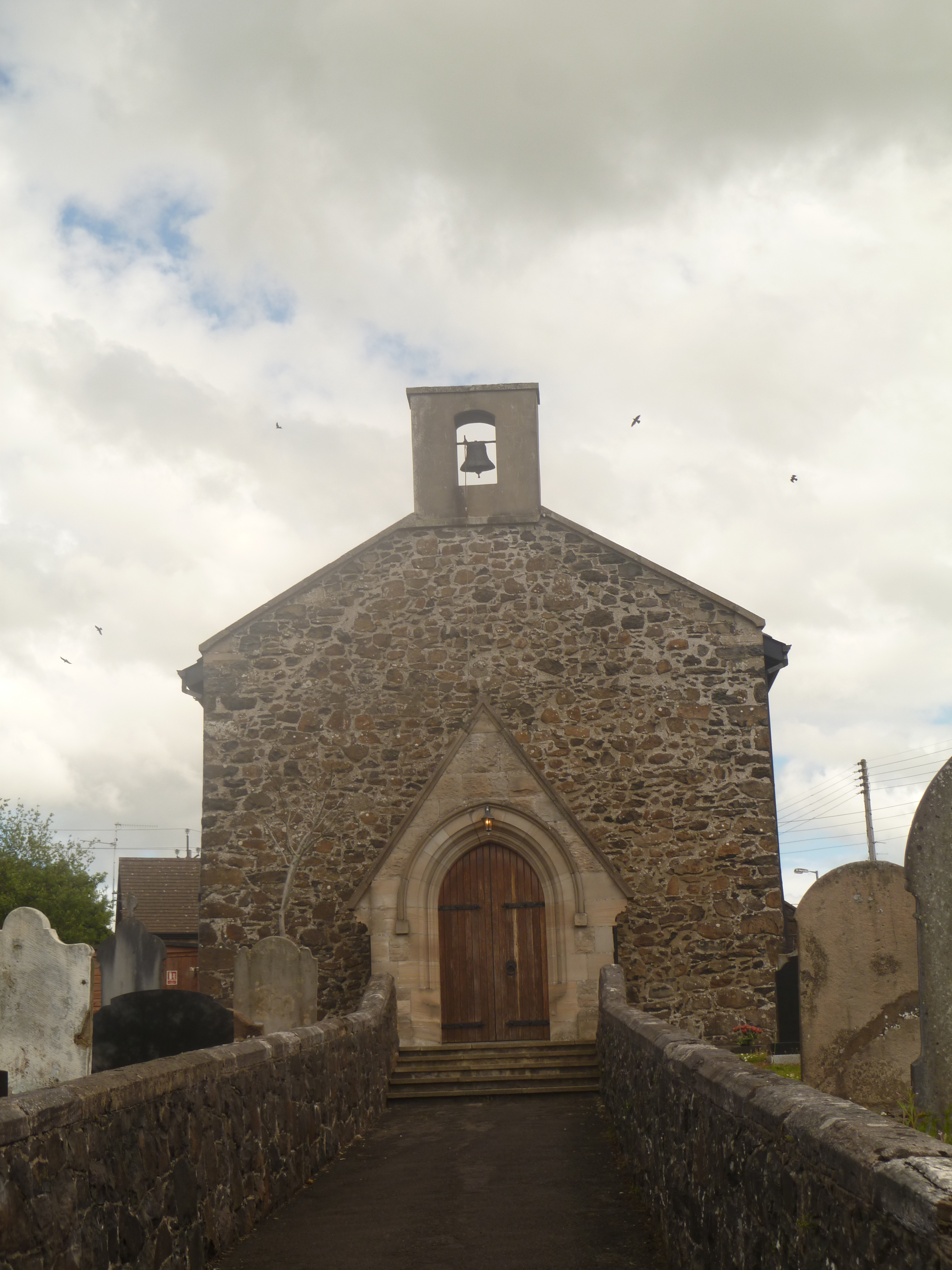
The west end of the church

== Description ==
Portglenone Church was consecrated in 1735, making it one of the oldest churches in the area. The porch was added and dedicated on 13 February 1912. The church was re-roofed in 1929.

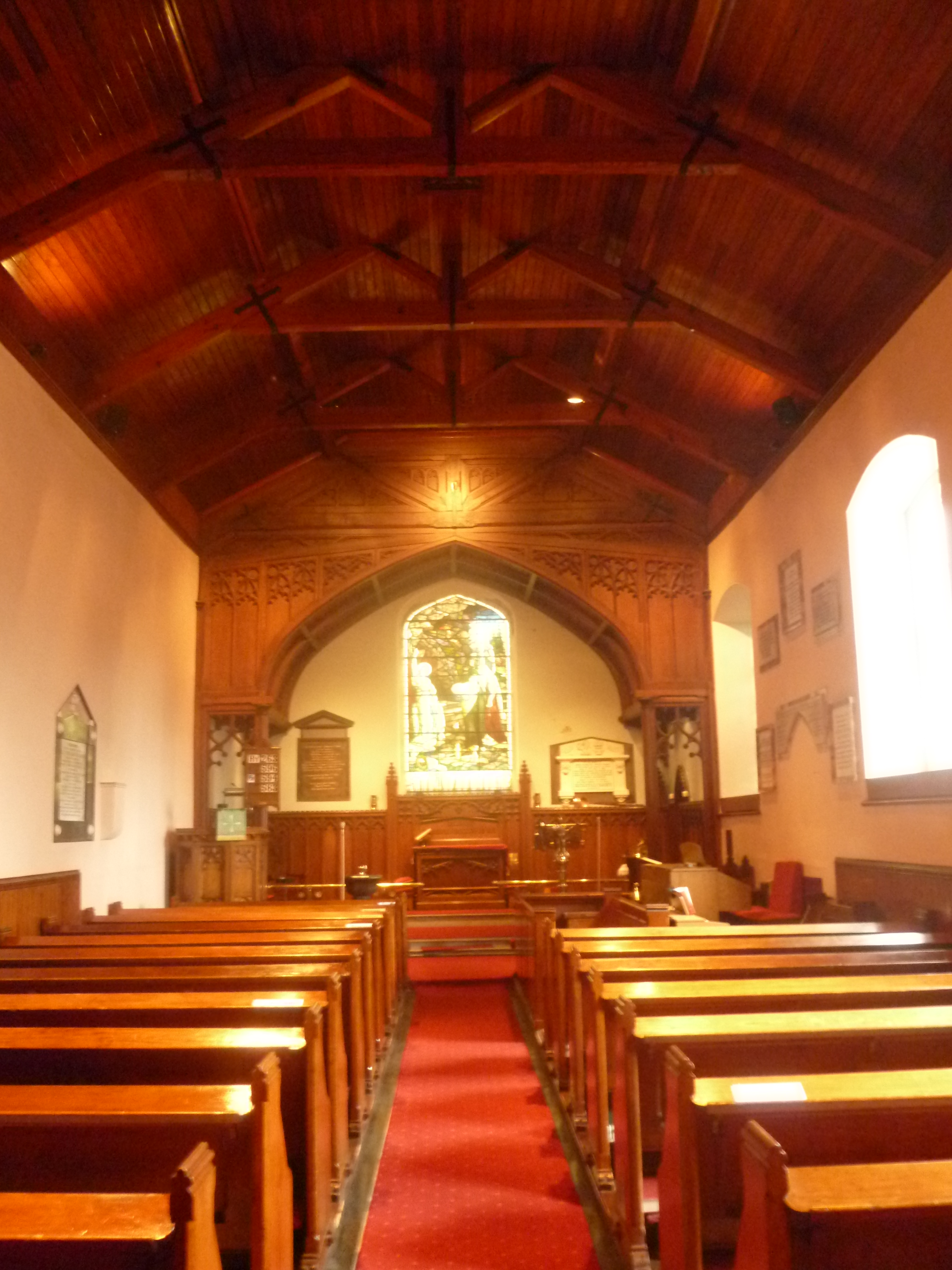
Interior, looking east
