= All-Ireland Senior Club Camogie Championship 1985 =

Camogie championship

Winners
- Champions: Crumlin Cuchulainn (Dublin) (1st title)
- Manager: Jimmy Boggan & Billy Maloney
- Captain: Yvonne Redmond

Runners-up
- Runners-up: Athenry (Gal)

The 1985 All-Ireland Senior Club Camogie Championship for the leading clubs in the women's team field sport of camogie was won by Crumlin Cuchulainns from Dublin), who defeated Athenry from Galway in the final, played at O'Toole Park. Crumlin fielded half the Dublin team that won the 1984 All-Ireland senior championship.

== Arrangements ==
The championship was organised on the traditional provincial system used in Gaelic Games since the 1880s, with Éire Óg and Eglish winning the championships of the other two provinces.

== The Final ==
Galway inter-county star Mary Keane was one of Crumlin’s stars against Athenry in the final.

=== Final stages ===
September 1
Semi-Final

Crumlin (Du)	2-4 – 1-5	Éire Óg

Ovens

October 6
Semi-Final

Athenry (Gal)	5-9 – 3-7	Eglish

Kenny Park

October 27
Final

Crumlin (Du)	4-8 – 3-2	Athenry (Gal)

O'Toole Park

Crumlin	Athenry

Crumlin (Du):
GK	1	Yvonne Redmond
FB	2	Anne Byrne
RWB	3	Ger Brady
CB	4	Anne Redmond
LWB	5	Bernie Toner
MF	6	Cathy Walsh
MF	7	Mary Mernagh
MF	8	Ger Byrne
RWF	9	Aileen Redmond
CF	10	Mary Keane
LWF	11	Anna Condon
FF	12	Barbara Redmond

Athenry (Gal):
GK	1	Breda Coady
FB	2	Noreen Treacy
RWB	3	Una Jordan
CB	4	Chris Silke
LWB	5	Mary Bellew
MF	6	Olive Molloy
MF	7	Bríd Holland
MF	8	Anne Coleman
RWF	9	Madge Hobbins
CF	10	Teresa Kavanagh
LWF	11	Anne Morris
FF	12	Marion Freaney

Preceded by All-Ireland Senior Club Camogie Championship 1984	All-Ireland Senior Club Camogie Championship; 1964 – present	Succeeded by All-Ireland Senior Club Camogie Championship 1986
