= Alan Keane (Gaelic footballer) =

Irish Gaelic footballer

Personal information
- Native name: Alan Ó Cathain (Irish)
- Born: Galway, Ireland
- Occupation: Garda
- Height: 1.95 m (6 ft 5 in)

Sport
- Sport: Gaelic Football
- Position: Goalkeeper
Club
- Years: Club
- Killererin
Club titles
- Galway titles: 4
Inter-county
- Years: County
- 2001–2006: Galway
Inter-county titles
- Connacht titles: 3
- All-Irelands: 1

Alan Keane is an inter-county Gaelic football goalkeeper for Galway. He has battled with Brian O'Donoghue for the position of first choice goalkeeper.

== Playing career ==
He made his debut for Galway in 2001 and has won 3 Connacht Senior Football Championship medals and 1 All-Ireland. He was called into the playing squad with no former inter-county experience at under age. He has also won Galway senior medals with his club and represented Connacht in the railway cup.
