= All-Ireland Senior Club Camogie Championship 1972 =

Camogie championship

Winners
- Champions: Austin Stacks (Du) (2nd title)
- Captain: Mary Ryan

Runners-up
- Runners-up: Portglenone (Ant)

The 1972 All-Ireland Senior Club Camogie Championship for the leading clubs in the women's team field sport of camogie was won for the second year in succession by Austin Stacks (Du), who defeated Portglenone (Ant) in the final, played at Croke Park.

== Arrangements ==
The championship was organised on the traditional provincial system used in Gaelic Games since the 1880s, with Oranmore and Ahane winning the championships of the other two provinces. Dublin champions Austin Stacks could call on with seven interprovincial players and were strengthened by the arrival of Liz Neary, who had already won three All- Ireland Club medals with St Paul’s, and the return of Sligo-born Mary Sherlock, holder of five All-Ireland senior medals. It was goalkeeper Sheila Murray who was player of the match in the semi-final victory over Oranmore, saving a wide variety of shots including a goal-bound 15-yard free. Portglenone were led by their All-Ireland star, Mairéad McAtamney, Sue McLarnon, Teresa McAtamney and Brigid Graham in their 11-point victory over Ahane, who had held a cake sale to help defray the cost of the journey.

== The Final ==
Anne Sheehy, Mary Ryan, Lucy McEvoy, Bríd Keenan and Vera Sullivan were key figures in Stacks’ win in the final.

=== Final stages ===
March 4, 1973
Semi-Final

Austin Stacks (Du)	4-5 – 1-3	Oranmore

Athenry

March 11, 1973
Semi-Final

Portglenone (Ant)	7-5 – 1-0	Ahane

Portglenone

March 25, 1973
Final

Austin Stacks (Du)	4-2 – 2-0	Portglenone (Ant)

Croke Park

Austin Stacks	Portglenone

Austin Stacks (Du):
GK	1	Sheila Murray
FB	2	Mary Ryan (captain)
RWB	3	Bríd Keenan
CB	4	Vera Sullivan
LWB	5	Dympna Caldwell
MF	6	Liz Neary 0-1
MF	7	Lucy McEvoy
MF	8	Orla Ní Síocháin 0–1
RWF	9	Pauline Brennan
CF	10	Anne Sheehy 2–0
LWF	11	Rita Halpin 2–0
FF	12	Mary Sherlock

Portglenone (Ant):
GK	1	Sue McLarnon
FB	2	Teresa McAtamney
RWB	3	Brigid Graham
CB	4	Olive Webb
LWB	5	Sadie McMullan
MF	6	Brenda Dillon
MF	7	Mairéad McAtamney
MF	8	Ann Kelly
RWF	9	Frances Graham
CF	10	Patricia O'Doherty
LWF	11	Enda Webb
FF	12	Sheena McAtamney

Preceded by All-Ireland Senior Club Camogie Championship 1971	All-Ireland Senior Club Camogie Championship; 1964 – present	Succeeded by All-Ireland Senior Club Camogie Championship 1973
