= Barnaderg =

Village in County Galway, Ireland

Coordinates: 53°29′N 8°43′W

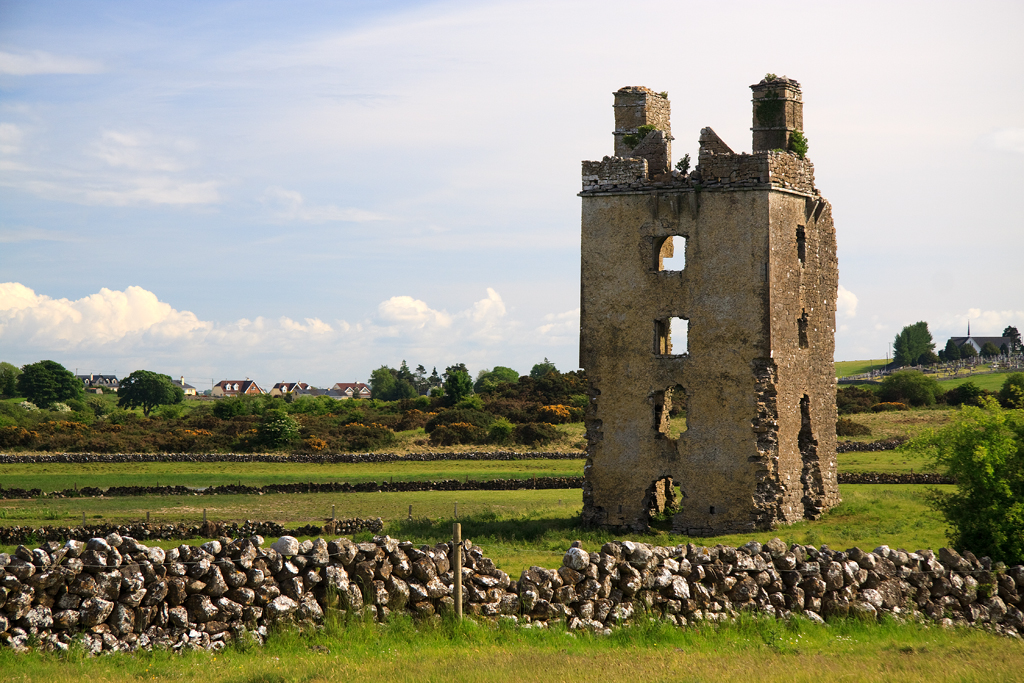
Barnaderg Castle, County Galway.

Barnaderg (Irish: Bearna Dhearg, meaning 'red gap') is a village located approximately 10 kilometres southeast of Tuam in eastern County Galway, Ireland.

Barnaderg Castle was a 16th-century stronghold of the O'Kelly clan.

A national school was built in Barnaderg in 1895. A new school was opened in 1973 and the old school became Barnaderg Community Centre. In June 2008, a €1.5m extension was opened at Barnaderg National School. In addition to the development of new classrooms, library, offices and other rooms, refurbishment of the existing building were carried out. As of October 2025, Barnaderg National School has 84 pupils, 6 teachers and 4 special needs assistants.

== Local people ==
- Thunderbolt Gibbons
