= Mannion =

Mannion is a surname of Irish origin. Notable people with the surname include:

- Aoife Mannion (born 1995), Woman professional football player
- Frank Mannion, Irish film producer
- Georgia Mannion (born 2003), Australian singer-songwriter known professionally as George Alice
- John Mannion Jnr (1944–2006), Irish politician
- Jonathan Mannion (born 1970), photographer and director
  - Mannion v. Coors Brewing Co., a copyright lawsuit brought by Jonathan Mannion, often referred to by his name.
- Karol Mannion, Irish gaelic football player
- Nico Mannion (born 2001), Italian-American basketball player
- Pace Mannion (born 1960), American basketball player
- Paul Mannion (born 1993), Irish gaelic football player
- Teresa Mannion, Irish journalist and broadcaster
- Wes Mannion (born 1970), director of Australia Zoo
- Wilf Mannion (1918–2000), English football player
- Will Mannion (born 1998), English football player
- John Mannion (born 1968), American politician
- Tom Mannion (born 1958) Scottish actor

== Fictional characters ==
- Chief Jack Mannion, fictional Irish-American in the television show The District
- Peter Mannion, a fictional MP in the British television series The Thick of It
- Nursing Sister Shelagh Turner (née Mannion), previously known by her religious name of Sister Bernadette, is a fictional Scottish midwife, medical secretary and nursing sister of Nonnatus House in the television show Call the Midwife
- Sir Christopher Mannion, a fictional magistrate in the novel The Leviathan by Rosie Andrews.

== See also ==
- Manion
- James Mannon, American sociologist
