= Bríd Reid =

Irish camogie player

Personal information
- Native name: Bríd Ní Riada (Irish)
- Born: Dublin, Ireland

Sport
- Sport: Camogie
- Position: full back
Inter-county**
| Years | County | Apps (scores) |
| 1953-59 | Dublin | ? |
Inter-county titles
- All-Irelands: 6
- * club appearances and scores correct as of (16:31, 30 June 2010 (UTC)). **Inter County team apps and scores correct as of (16:31, 30 June 2010 (UTC)).

Bríd Reid is a former camogie player, captain of the All Ireland Camogie Championship-winning team in 1959 and, unusually (for the time), returned by air from her honeymoon in The Isle of Man to captain the team to victory.

== Career ==
She won five All Ireland senior medals in 1953, 1954, 1955, 1957 and 1958. She scored a dramatic last minute winning goal for Dublin against Antrim in the 1957 final.
