= Fiachra Breathnach =

Irish Gaelic footballer from Galway

Personal information
- Native name: Fiachra Breathnach (Irish)
- Born: 21 November 1986 (age 39) Galway, Ireland
- Occupation: Barrister
- Height: 1.87 m (6 ft 2 in)

Sport
- Sport: Gaelic Football
- Position: Left Half Forward
Clubs
- Years: Club
- 2003–2015 2016–: Naomh Anna, Leitir Móir; St Vincents
Inter-county
Years	County	Apps (scores)
2006–2011	Galway	7 (1-1)
Inter-county titles
- Connacht titles: 1

Fiachra Breathnach (born 21 November 1986) is an Irish Gaelic footballer from Galway. Breathnach played his club football with Naomh Anna, Leitir Móir before transferring to St Vincents, and is a former county footballer for the Galway senior football panel.

== Underage level ==
Breathnach represented Galway City and West at u16 level in the Ted Webb competition in 2001 and again in 2002. He was a member of the Galway minor panels which won the Connaught championships in 2003 and 2004. Galway were beaten in the All Ireland Minor Football Championship Quarter-final in 2004 by Down by a single point, 0-15 to 1-11. Breathnach contributed 1-1 from midfield.

Breathnach attended St Jarlath's College, Tuam and was a member of the 2003 team that contested the Hogan Cup Final. Breathnach captained the St. Jarlaths College, Tuam Senior Football Team in 2004. He was chosen to represent Ireland as part of the International rules schoolboy series of that year. The Irish team recorded a first ever series victory over the Australians in the u18 International Rules Series. Breathnach scored eleven points in the second test and three points in the third test.

He then proceeded to win a 'Fresher A' intervarsity title with NUI,Galway (NUIG) in 2005. They defeated Cork IT in the final. Breathnach scored both goals for the NUIG team. Later that year, he won the 2005 All-Ireland U-21 Football Championship with Galway.

Breathnach captained the NUIG Men's Senior Gaelic Football Team in the Galway Senior Football Championships in 2007 and 2008. NUIG reached the semi-finals of the competition in both years but were defeated by Killerarin and Cortoon Shamrocks respectively. He also captained the NUI,Galway Men's Senior Gaelic Football Team in the "Sigerson" interversity competition in 2008.

== Galway Senior career ==
Breathnach is a former member of the Galway Senior Football Squad. He made his debut under Peter Forde in 2006 as a substitute in a SFC qualifier against Westmeath. Breathnach was named to start the match but was unable to take his place in the starting lineup due to illness. A "career highlight" was the "vital goal" he scored in the 2008 Connacht SFC final against Mayo.

== Club honours ==
Breathnach captained his club Naomh Anna, Leitir Móir to the Galway Intermediate Football Championship in 2009 and also the Connacht Intermediate Club title. Leitir Móir eventually lost to Cookstown Fr. Rock's from Tyrone in the All-Ireland series on 24 January 2010 at Pearse Park, Longford.

== See also ==
- Breathnach
