= Andrew Ó hAughegan =

Irish informant

Andrew Ó hAughegan (Ó Gegan, Gegan), Ribbonmen informant, fl. 1820.

Ó hAughegan was a servant of Patrick Cullen, a revenue officer who resided at Coorheen, Loughrea. On a night in late February or early March 1820, Cullen's house was visited by Ribbonmen led by Anthony Daly. Ó hAughegan gave the following account of the incident (Inft means Informant):

This Inft, being at his masters house at Coreen … he was awoke out of his Sleep by a Violent knocking at the Kitchen door ... Inft, having got up Opened the door and saw Several armed men about it who ordered Inft. to go down on his knees and bless himself which having done a book was put into his hand and he was directed to Kiss it he was then sworn as to whether there was guns swords or pistols in the House also not to prosecute a ribbon man and to go to Ballinafad next night and bring his party money with him Inft. looking up at the man who was speaking and who swore Informant knew him to be one Daly blind of an eye whom he Inft. had before seen in Loughrea and who then held a Sword over Informants head on one side and had a white Tape round his hat another man held a bayonet to Inft. on one side and a third man a gun to his breast on the other side on Inft. looking up Daly desired him to keep down his head and not to look up at him, Inft. was then asked if there was any other man in the House he replied there was Michl Burns who Coming to the door was made to kneel down and was Sworn in the same way as Inft.

Ó hAughegan attended the Ballinfad meeting (which was near Dunsandle) with Burns and Several of the Neighbours. He saw Daly among a great number of persons ... with a Sword in his hand as before and Something white on his hat. However, he was cautioned by a friend, John Ó hAughegan, not to go near Daly, as some injury was intended to be done to him ... being suspected of having given Information to his master against an Illicit still. Ó hAughegan ran away.

The following week Ribbonmen visited Cullen's house, demanding Ó hAughegan. Cullen said he had expelled him, though he had in fact hidden him in the hayloft. Departing, the Ribbonmen stated that Ó hAughegan should soon know his doom.

In fear of his life, Ó hAughegan went to James Daly, 1st Baron Dunsandle and Clanconal, who informed the authorities in a letter dated 15 March. On 19 March, six leading Ribbonmen from between Loughrea and Craughwell were arrested. These men joined some one hundred other insurgents who had been captured following a series of battles between them and the military. Nine were condemned to death (six reprieved), the rest sentenced to flogging, imprisonment or transportation. Anthony Daly was hung on Seefin, between Loughrea and Craughwell.

Ó hAughegan's fate is uncertain. James Daly wanted him removed from the county for his own safety, though there is no indication this took place. Local tradition relates that he was eventually captured by the Ribbonmen and hanged at Cregg Castle, Kilchreest.
