= James MacHugo =

Irish merchant and United Irishman

James MacHugo was an Irish merchant who in the revolutionary period 1797–1799 helped build a United Irish organisation in his native Loughrea, County Galway.

MacHugo was a merchant trading in tobacco until found guilty of smuggling, which led to revenue officers impounding his entire stock and putting him out of business. He became involved in the United Irishman movement, acting as a link between members in Loughrea and its environs and in Dublin.

He was a close associate of Francis Dillon and Peter Finnerty, all of whom helped build the society's network in the town, especially among its lower-class tradesmen. When Finnerty, as publisher of the United Irish paper the Press, was imprisoned in Dublin in spring 1798, he continued to stay in touch with the society in Loughrea via MacHugo; a report dated April 1798 stated that "There is strong ground to think that Peter Finnerty corresponds with his friends in this town thro' this man."

The local Anglo-Irish lord, Richard Trench, 2nd Earl of Clancarty, characterised the activities of MacHugo and associates as providing local people with a "secret introduction of modern philosophical opinions." Administration of seditious oaths and violent outbreaks, especially in the Slieve Aughty region, were on the rise at the time. However, because guns and ammunition were successfully seized by the authorities, when the actual Irish Rebellion of 1798 broke out, County Galway remained quiet.

In January 1799 MacHugo was still under surveillance, as the county was again disturbed and fears of a further rising were very great. Despite this, MacHugo remained free, and fades from the historical record afterwards.

== See also ==
- Edmond MacHugo
