= Menlough GAA =

Gaelic sports club in County Galway, Ireland

Menlough GAC
- Mionlach
- Founded: 1911
- County: Galway
- Nickname: The Monsters
- Colours: Green and Gold
- Grounds: Menlough GAC Grounds
- Coordinates: 53°25′26.10″N 8°35′16.77″W

Playing kits
Standard colours

Menlough is a Gaelic Athletic Association club based in Menlough, County Galway, Ireland. The club is a member of the Galway GAA. Menlough compete in the Galway Senior Club Football Championship.
