= James Mannon =

American sociologist

James M. Mannon (born February 16, 1942) is a professor emeritus of sociology at DePauw University in Indiana, and until his retirement held the Larz A. Whitcomb Professorship of Sociology at DePauw.

Mannon did his undergraduate and graduate studies at Southern Illinois University, and worked at Monmouth College (1968–1972), Millikin University (1973–1975), and Southern Illinois University before joining the DePauw faculty in 1975. He retired in 2001.

== Books ==
- Close, But No Cigar (self-published, 2015)
- Epilogue: Poems of Love and Loss (self-published through AuthorHouse, 2005)
- Emergency Encounters: a study of an urban ambulance service (1981) updated and re-released in 1991 as Emergency encounters: EMTs and their work, (Boston: Jones and Bartlett Publishers, 1992), ISBN 0-8046-9281-5.
- American gridmark: why you’ve always suspected that measuring up doesn’t count, (Tucson, Arizona: Harbinger House, 1990).
- Measuring up: the performance ethic in American culture, (Boulder, Colorado: Westview Press, 1997), ISBN 0-8133-3297-4 (paperback).
- Caring for the burned: life and death in a hospital burn center, (Springfield, Illinois, Thomas, 1985), ISBN 0-398-05089-9.
