= Buffers Alley GAA =

Gaelic games club in County Wexford, Ireland

Buffers Alley
- Aillí Na Buffaire
- Founded: 1870s
- County: Wexford
- Colours: Green, gold and white
- Grounds: Buffers Alley GAA Grounds, Ballinastraw Lower
- Coordinates: 52°33′49″N 6°19′38″W

Playing kits
Standard colours

Senior Club Championships
| | All Ireland | Leinster champions | Wexford champions |
|---|---|---|---|
| Hurling: | 1 | 3 | 12 |
| Camogie: | 5 | 8 | 14 |

Buffers Alley is a Gaelic Athletic Association club based in the villages of Kilmuckridge and Monamolin in County Wexford, Ireland. The club fields teams in Intermediate hurling, Gaelic football and camogie. It competes in Wexford competitions.

== History ==
The Buffers Alley club is one of the oldest in Wexford, founded in the late 1870s. Its name derives from a crossroads in Ballydaniel, about 4.4 km (3 mi) to the west of the current grounds. "Alley" means a narrow roadway, and does not appear to refer to a ball alley. 'Buffer' means countryman (non-Traveller), 'fool' or 'boxer'.

Buffers Alley club came quickly to the fore and won its first title in 1905. Twenty-three lean years followed for the club but the spirit of the men of 1905 eventually bore fruit when they won another junior title in 1928. History repeated itself 23 years later – 1951 when the third junior title came. In 1952 they played St Aidan's again in the senior championship but were narrowly defeated. Having played senior for three years they reverted to the junior grade in 1955.

In 1959 the Shamrocks defeated them in a memorable junior semi-final. With many young players coming from the Rackard League competitions, the club entered Intermediate competition in 1962 Even though it was only a junior club, this was the move that set Buffers Alley on the road to the top. They were beaten in their first Intermediate year by Hollow Rangers and Davidstown-Courtnacuddy the following year.

The first Intermediate win came in 1965, and that same year won under-21 honours for the first time, repeating it in 1966. These wins sowed the seeds for many years to come. Entering senior grade in 1967, they quickly came to the top, having been beaten by their rivals – Rathnure combination. 1968 was to be their year. Their success story really started on a terrible day in Belfield, with rain, wind, sleet, and snow, and a few loyal supporters; they slowly but surely overcame St Martin's side. Battling their way to the final, they went in as underdogs and made history on that memorable day in December against Harriers side. This team was captained by Joe Murphy in the absence of Captain, Paddy Sinnott. They repeated this in 1970. Beaten in the 1973 final by Rathnure. Buffers Alley returned to their winning ways in 1975 and 1976, beating Oulart-The Ballagh and Rapparees respectively. Defeats in the final of '80 and '81 were followed by what can only be described as the Golden Era for Buffers Alley, winning eight Wexford Senior Hurling Championship titles over the next ten years.

During the 1970s and 80s Buffers Alley made an impact on the football scene in County Wexford. They created a surprise in 1972 in winning the county junior football title. Proving this to be no flash in the pan, they won the Intermediate football final in 1974 and completed in senior ranks for a number of years. They returned to Intermediate ranks in the mid 80's and once again were successful in the Intermediate football championship in 1989.

Their first ever appearance in a Leinster Senior Club Hurling Championship final was in 1971 when they were narrowly defeated by St Rynagh's of Offaly. A Buffers Alley team captained by Sean Whelan beat a Kinnity back boned by the great Pat Delaney and the Corrigan brothers Mark and Paddy in the 1985 final and went all the way to the All-Ireland Final but was defeated by Kilruane MacDonagh's in a close final. They beat Ballyhale Shamrocks from Kilkenny in the 1988 Leinster Final. The crowning glory for Buffers Alley arrived on St Patrick's Day in 1989 when they became the first and only County Wexford club to win the All-Ireland Senior Club Hurling Championship with a win over O'Donovan Rossa.

The club last competed at this level in 1992 when they once again took Leinster Club honours but lost out to Sarsfields of Galway in the Semi-Final. Their next county final was in 2007 losing to Oulart and then in 2009 they faced the same opposition but lost again.

== Camogie ==
Buffers Alley camogie club is the joint second most successful in the history of the All-Ireland Senior Club Camogie Championship with a total of five victories in 1979, 1981, 1982, 1983 and 1984. They won further Leinster championship titles in 1975, and 1980. During this ascendance they won 14 successive Wexford county titles. Founded in 1969 by Tom O'Leary, Tom Butler, John Doyle, Syl Murphy, Bertie Cousins and Peter Kavanagh, they won the Wexford Junior Championship in their first year and the senior title in 1971.

== Honours ==
- All-Ireland Senior Club Hurling Championship (1)
  - 1989
- All-Ireland Senior Club Camogie Championship (5)
  - 1979, 1981, 1982, 1983, 1984; runners-up 1978, 1980
- Leinster Senior Club Hurling Championship (3)
  - 1986, 1988, 1992; runners-up 1983
- Leinster Senior Club Camogie Championship (8)
  - 1975, 1978, 1979, 1980, 1981, 1982, 1983, 1984
- Wexford Senior Hurling Championship (12)
  - 1968, 1970, 1975, 1976, 1982, 1983, 1984, 1985, 1988, 1989, 1991, 1992
- Wexford Intermediate Hurling Championship (2)
  - 1965, 2013
- Wexford Intermediate Football Championship (2)
  - 1974, 1989
- Wexford Junior Hurling Championship (4)
  - 1905, 1928, 1951, 1982
- Wexford Junior Football Championship (1)
  - 1972, 2022
- Wexford Under-21 Hurling Championship (5)
  - 1965 (with Oulart–The Ballagh), 1966 (with Oulart–The Ballagh), 1984 (with St. Patrick's), 1986 (with St. Patrick's), 2024
- Wexford Minor Football Championship (1)
  - 1983 (with St. Patrick's)
- Wexford Minor Hurling Championships: (1)
  - 1967 (with Oulart–The Ballagh)

== Notable players ==
- Mick Butler
- Tom Dempsey
- Tony Doran
- Willie Doran
- Ciarán Kenny
