= Athenry GAA =

Gaelic sports club in County Galway, Ireland

St. Mary's, Athenry
- Ath an Ri
- Founded: 1885
- County: Galway
- Colours: Maroon and white
- Grounds: Raheen, Athenry; Carnaun, Athenry
- Coordinates: 53.325°N 8.785°W

Playing kits
Standard colours

Senior Club Championships
	All Ireland	Connacht champions	Galway champions
Hurling:	3	8	8
Camogie:	2	8	13

St. Mary's, Athenry is a Gaelic Athletic Association club located in Athenry in County Galway, Ireland. In men's competitions, the club is a dual club competing in both Gaelic football and hurling at various age levels. The club also competes in camogie competitions, and has won several county, province and national titles in the sport.

== History ==
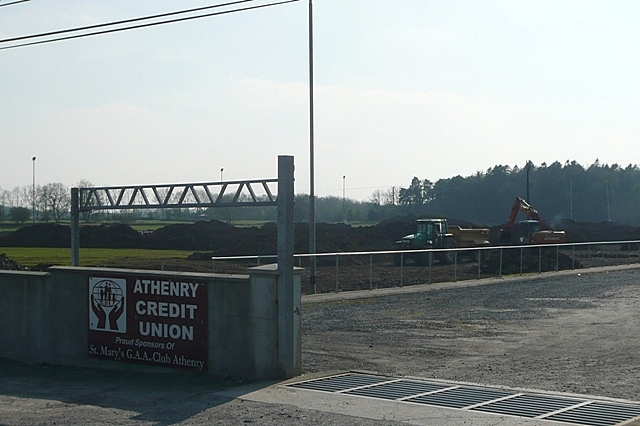
Grounds at Carnaun (2009 image)

Athenry GAA club was founded in 1885. In the late 19th and early 20th centuries, the club fielded both Gaelic football and hurling teams. The club also participated in handball competitions. While camogie was played locally from at least the 1920s, Athenry's camogie club was formally established in 1973.

== Hurling ==
The club contested its first county final in 1977. Victory on that occasion went to Kiltormer. Athenry's next county final appearance came in 1987, when they were victorious. They defeated Castlegar 1-12 to 2-6. They went all the way to the All-Ireland final but they were defeated by Midleton from Cork. Athenry also went on to compete in the next two county finals in 1988 and 1989 where they were defeated on both occasions. 1991 was Athenry's next county final appearance; however, they were again defeated by Kiltormer. Athenry's second county title came in 1994 after they defeated Sarsfields 2-6 to 0-9. Following this county final victory, six county titles (1996, 1998, 1999, 2000, 2002, 2004), six Connacht titles (1996, 1998, 1999, 2000, 2002, 2004), and three All Ireland titles (1997, 2000 and 2001) were achieved in a ten-year period from 1994 to 2004.

=== Honours ===
- All-Ireland Senior Club Hurling Championship (3): 1997, 2000, 2001
- Connacht Senior Club Hurling Championship (8): 1987, 1994, 1996, 1998, 1999, 2000, 2002, 2004
- Galway Senior Hurling Championship (8): 1987, 1994, 1996, 1998, 1999, 2000, 2002, 2004
- Galway Senior B Hurling Championship (1): 2024
- Galway Intermediate Hurling Championships (2): 1960, 1998
- Galway Junior A Hurling Championships (1): 2019

== Camogie ==
Athenry Camogie Club won the All-Ireland Senior Club Camogie Championship in 1977. They won further Connacht titles in 1972, 1975, 1976, 1978, 1979, 1982, 1985, 1986, 2006, 2007, 2008 and 2009 and were Galway senior champions on 13 occasions. The club was founded in 1973 by Gilbert McCarthy, a teacher at Presentation, Athenry, Christy Kelly and Anthony Poniard. Their initial club success was based on the successful Presentation School sides and many of the players who won All-Ireland senior and junior championships in 1974.

Kenny Park in Athenry is sometimes used as a home ground by the Galway senior camogie team.

Club player Kate Moran died the day after an injury in an April 2022 match.

In 2025, Athenry won their second All Ireland Senior Club Camogie title beating St. Finbarr's of Cork after a replay by 0–14 to 0–12.

=== Honours ===
- All-Ireland Senior Club Camogie Championship (2): 1977, 2025
- Connacht Senior Club Camogie Championship (8): 1976, 1977, 1978, 1979, 1982, 1985, 1986
- Galway Senior Camogie Championship (13): 1975, 1976, 1977, 1978, 1979, 1982, 1985, 1986, 2006, 2007, 2008, 2009, 2025

== Football ==
A team representing Athenry, competing as "Athenry De Wetts", won the Galway Senior Football Championship in 1903, 1904 and 1906. Later in the 20th century, teams from Athenry won several junior, minor and underage county football competitions.

== Notable players ==
- Eugene Cloonan
- Jarlath Cloonan
- Michael Crimmins
- Brian Hanley
- P. J. Molloy
- Joe Rabbitte
- Brian Feeney
- Tom Flynn
- Therese Maher
- Jessica Gill
