= Anthony Daly (Whiteboy) =

Irish activist (died 1820)

Anthony Daly (died 1820) was a native of Rahruddy, a townland west of Loughrea, County Galway, Ireland, and a member of the local Whiteboy movement. Daly was hanged on the Hill of Seefin in 1820 for allegedly attempting to assassinate local landlord James Hardiman Burke, father of explorer Robert O'Hara Burke, of St Clerans, Craughwell, County Galway, even though it was widely claimed that he was innocent.

Samuel Barber composed a significant choral work, "Anthony O Daly", lamenting his death, based on a poem of retribution by Antoine Ó Raifteirí translated by James Stephens in his collection, Reincarnations.

Numerous literary references have been made to Daly, including in John Steinbeck's short nonfiction work The Ghost of Anthony Daly.

== See also ==
- Andrew Ó hAughegan
- Neddy Lohan
