= Stellah Sinnott =

Irish camogie player and manager

Personal information
- Native name: Stella Ní Sionóid (Irish)
- Born: County Wexford, Ireland

Sport
- Sport: Camogie
- Position: center back
- Position: position
Inter-county
- Years: County
- Wexford

Stellah Sinnott (born 1962) is a camogie manager, winner of a Manager of the Year award after she guided Wexford to their first All Ireland title in 32 years in 2007. She was the first woman to manage a first rank inter-county camogie team.
