= Glenamaddy GAA =

Gaelic sports club in County Galway, Ireland

- Gleann na Madadh
- Founded: 1888
- County: Galway
- Nickname: Glan
- Colours: Blue & Gold
- Grounds: Glenamaddy
- Coordinates: 53°36′22.60″N 8°33′07.81″W

Playing kits
Standard colours

Glenamaddy GAA is a Gaelic Athletic Association club based in Glenamaddy, County Galway, Ireland. The club is a member of the Galway GAA. Glenamaddy compete in the Galway Intermediate Football Championship. The club has never won the competition.
