= Monamolin =

Irish village

Coordinates: 52°33′N 6°21′W

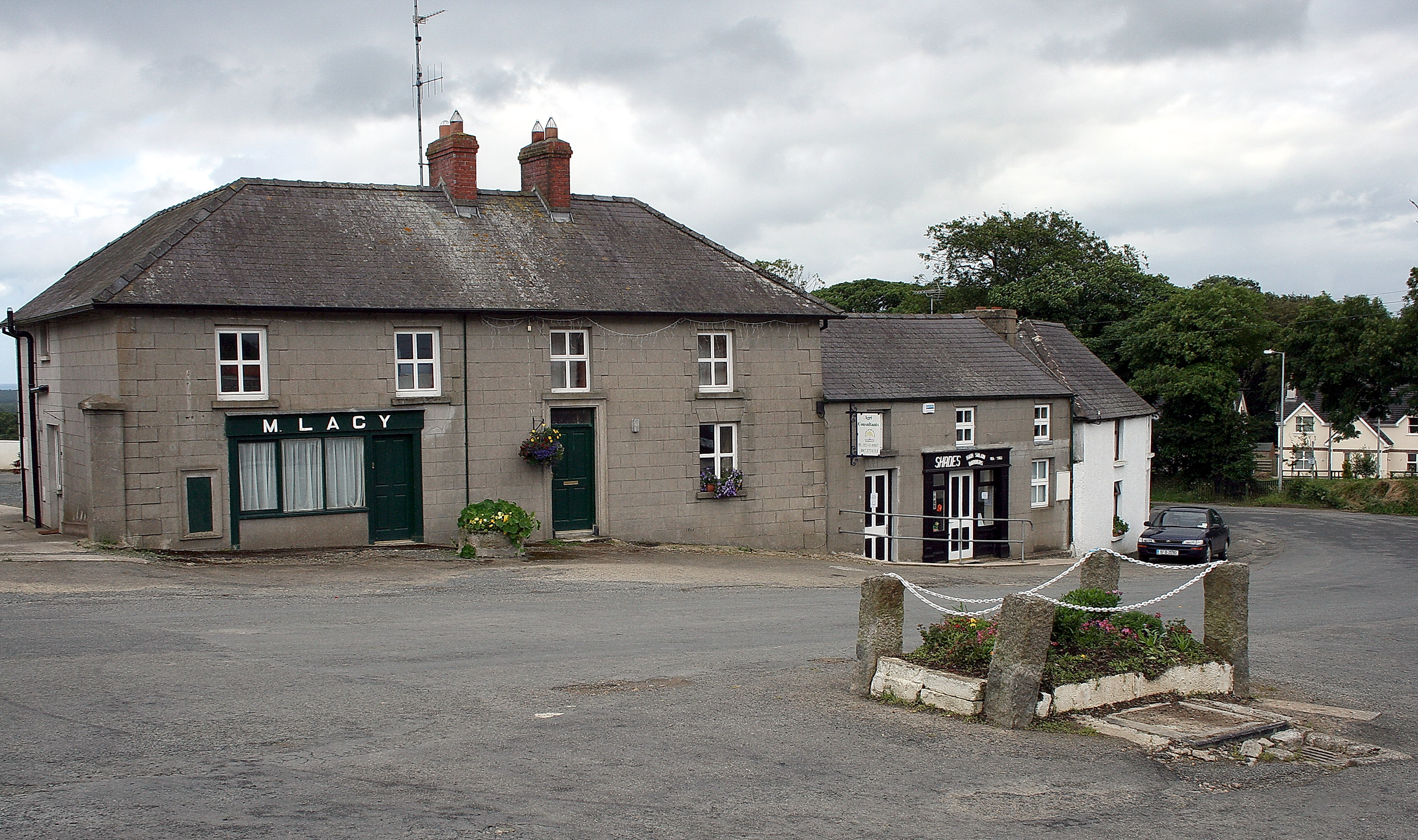
Village square, Manomolin

Monamolin or Monamoling (Irish: Muine Moling) is a small rural village in County Wexford, Ireland, about 11 km (6.8 mi) south of the town of Gorey.

Monamolin (in the civil parish of the same name), has a population of 661.

Villages nearby include Kilmuckridge, Oulart, Boolavogue, Ballycanew and Ballygarrett.

== Name ==
In 1685 Sir William Petty's map spells it Monemoling (a pronunciation which has survived to the present day). By 1837 the spelling had changed to Monemolin according to Samuel Lewis's Topographical Dictionary of Ireland. In 1851 The Index of Irish Townlands records it as Monomolin. However, Monamolin is the standardised spelling today.

The various English versions of the name all come from the Irish, Muine Moling. Saint Moling (d. 696) was a seventh-century Irish saint. O'Donaill's Irish-English Dictionary translates muine as "brushwood" or "scrub". Therefore, the name means "the brushwood" or "scrub of Moling".

== Amenities ==
Local services and locations include Court National School, a pub and shop, a Montessori group, Roman Catholic church, Church of Ireland church and Buffers Alley GAA club.

== See also ==
- List of towns and villages in the Republic of Ireland
