= Abbot of Clonfert =

The Abbot of Clonfert was the monastic head of the abbey of Clonfert in County Galway, Ireland. The abbey was founded by Saint Brendan in the early sixth century. The abbots also bore the title "Comarbai Brénaind", "successor of Saint Brendan".

== List of abbots ==
- Brendan (Brénaind moccu Altai; Bréanainn; Naomh Breandán), d. 16 May 577/8.
- Fintan Corach (Corad), d. 21 February 592.
- Senach, d. 604.
- Senach Garb mac Buidi, d. 10 September 621.
- Ségán Carrthach, d. 636.
- Cumméne Foto mac Fiachnai, also bishop, d. 12 November 661/2.
- Fáclán, fl. 696/7.
- Fachtnae mac Folachtáin, d. 729.
- Fiachnae us Maic Niad, d. 752.
- Cellán, d. 753.
- Suibne, d. 762.
- Crimthann mac Rechtgaile, d. 766.
- Ceithernach ua hErmono (?Rumono), d. 773.
- Flaithnio mac Congaile, d. 781.
- Mac Flaithniad, d. 783.
- Tipraite mac Ferchair, d. 786
- Muiredach, d. 792.
- Muiredach mac Ólchobair, d. 802.
- Ceannfaeladh
- Conghaltach
- Tipraite mac Ceithernaig, d. 817.
- Ólchobar mac Cummascaig, d. 820.
- Ruithnél, also bishop, d. 826.
- Coinnecán, possibly deposed 838.
- Feidlimid mac Cremthanin, also king of Munster, abbot of Cork, scribe and anchorite, died 28 August 847.
- Rechtabrae, d. 850.
- Connagan
- Cormac mac Ciaran
- Mugrón ua Cinn Fáelad, d. 885.
- Máel Tuili mac Cilléni, d. 888.
- Máel Petair ua Cuáin, also bishop and abbot of Terryglass, d. 895.
- Áed mac Ailella, d. 916.
- Áed mac Cellaig, d. 958.
- Eógan ua Catháin, d. 981.
- Máel Petair ua Tolaig, d. 992.
- Fiachra Ua Focarta
- Óengus ua Flainn, d. 1036.
- Coscrach mac Aingeda, also abbot of Killaloe, d. 1040.
- Diarmait mac Máel Brénainn, d. at Ardfert in 1074.
- Coinneccám Ua Flainn, d. 1081.
- Cenn Fáelad Ua hÓcáin, d. 1091.
- Ua Corcráin, also bishop, d. 1094.
- Gilla Muire Ua Fogartaig (Máel Muire Ua Fócarta), d. 1112.
- Máel Brénainn Ua hÁnradáin, d. 1132/4.
- Gilla Meic Aiblén Ua hAnmchada, d. 1166.

== Bishops of Clonfert ==
The following are the people at the abbey who were consecrated as bishops, though many did not hold the office of coarb or abbot.

- Móenu, d. 1 March 572.
- Eitchén, d. 578.
- Cenn Fáelad, d.807.
- Laithbertach mac Óengusso, d. 822.
- Cormac mac Áedáin, d. 922.
- Ciarán ua Gabla, d. 953.
- Cathal mac Cormaic, d. 963.
- Eochu mac Scolaige, d. 1031.

== See also ==
- Bishop of Clonfert
- Clonfert Cathedral
