= Barinthus =

Barinthus can refer to:

- Manannan Mac Lir, sea and weather god from Irish mythology
- Barvitus, supposed saint
- Barinthus, a character in the "Merry Gentry" series of books by Laurell K. Hamilton
- Vaccitech, a biotech company that renamed to Barinthus Biotherapeutics in 2023
