= Conghaltach mac Etguini =

Conghaltach mac Etguini (died 808) was Abbot of Clonfert.

Conghaltach is described as Prior, not Abbot, unless he held two offices at once, as did Cormac mac Ciaran and Ruthmael.

Preceded by Ceannfaeladh of Clonfert	Abbot of Clonfert; 802–802	Succeeded by Tibraide mac Cethernach
