= 620 (disambiguation) =

620 may refer to:

- 620 (year)
- 620 (number)
- 620 AM, an AM radio frequency
- 6-2-0, a locomotive wheel arrangement
- 620 film, a format of photographic film
- Cessna 620, a prototype airplane
- Rickenbacker 620, a model of electric guitar
