= Abbot of Lismore =

The Abbot of Lismore (Irish: Lios Mór; Latin: Lismorensis) was the head of Lismore Abbey, which is in modern-day County Waterford, Ireland.

The abbey was founded by Saint Mo Chutu in the early seventh century. After the death of Saint Mo Chutu, the abbots bore the title "Comarbai Mo Chutu" (i.e. "successor of Saint Mo Chutu"). A few of the abbots and others at the monastery were consecrated as bishops. In 1111, Niall mac Meic Áedacáin became the first diocesan bishop of Lismore when the diocese of Lismore was established by the Synod of Ráth Breasail.

== List of abbots ==
The following is a list of abbots and monastic bishops. (Those who are not fully considered as abbot are indicated in square brackets, and those who were consecrated as bishops, but did not hold the office of abbot are indicated in italics and rounded brackets):

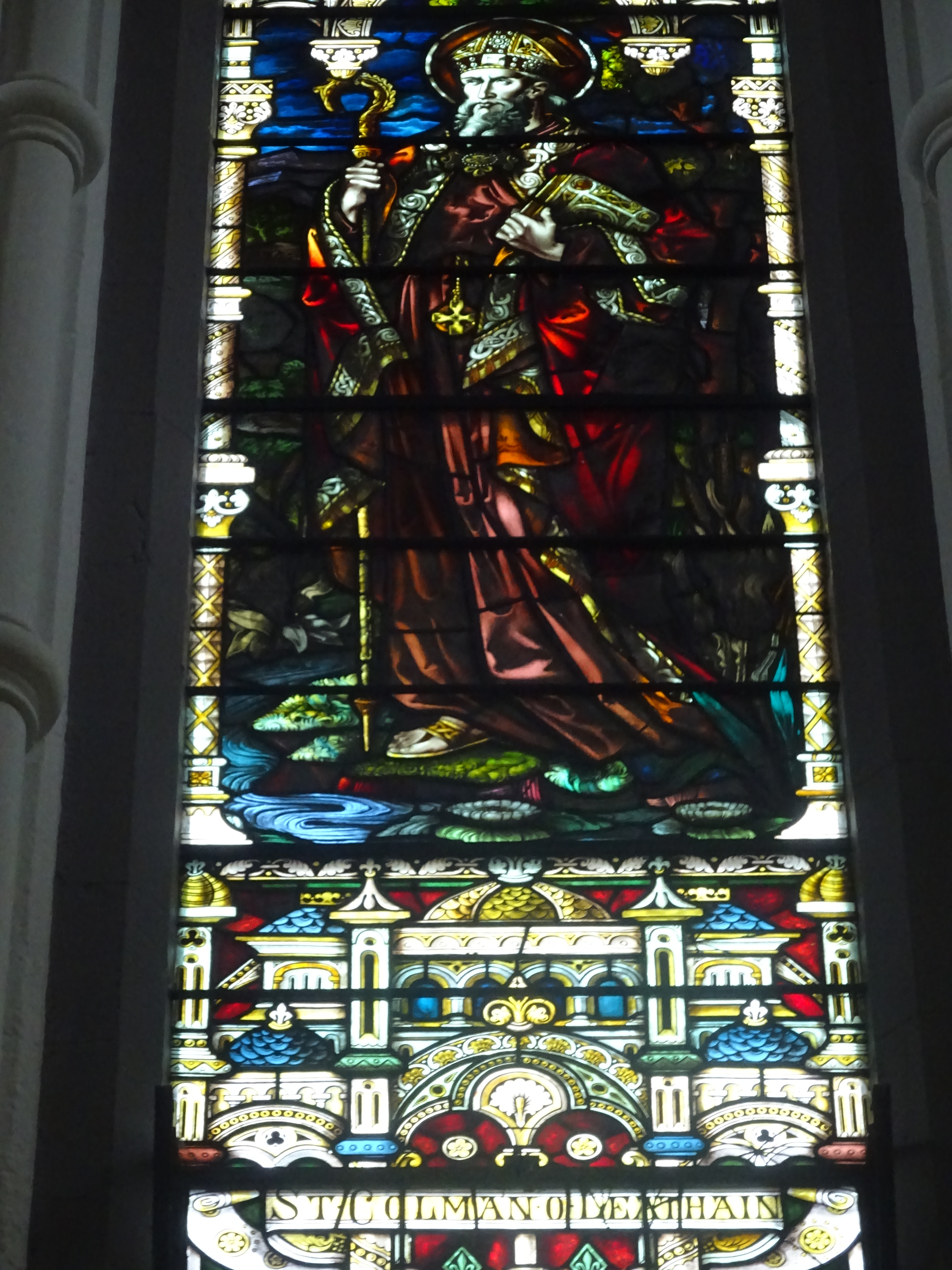
Stained glass image of Colmán of Lismore

- Saint Mo Chutu (Cathage, or Carrthach), d. 14 May 637/39.
- Names and dates of the abbots to the late 600s are unknown.
- [Conodur, possibly abbot of Lismore, fl. 696/97].^{[A]}
- Iarnlach (Iarlug, Iarlaga), also consecrated as a bishop, d. 16 January 700.
- Cuandae (Cuanu), d. 4 February 701.
- Colmán mac Findbairr (Mo Cholmóc, Colmán of Leathain, Colmán of Lismore), d. 22 January 703.
- Crónán ua hÉcáin, d. 1 June 718.
- Colmán ua Litáin, d. 25 July 730.
- Mac Óige, d. 3 December 752/53.
- Tríchmech (or Trígmech), also consecrated as a bishop, d. 7 July 760. (He is mentioned in the Annals of Inisfallen)
- Áedáin, d. 19 July 768.
- Suairlech mac Ciaráin, d. 4 December 774.
- Órach, also abbot of Inis Domle, d. 781.
- (Ronan, consecrated as a bishop, but not abbot of Lismore, d. 9 February 793).
- Áedán moccu Raichlich (mac Raichlich), also consecrated as a bishop, d. 16 March 814.
- Fland mac Faírchellaig, also abbot of Cork and Emly, d. 21 December 825.
- Daniél ua Líahaiti, also abbot of Cork, d. 863.
- Fland mac Forbassaig, d. 894.
- Máel Brigte mac Máel Domnaig, d. 912.
- [Cormac mac Mothla, king of Déise, abbot of Kilmolash. Consecrated as a bishop and was secnap (i.e. prior), d. 920].
- Ciarán mac Ciarmacáin, d. 938.
- Diarmait, d. 953.
- Diamait mac Torpthai, d. 954.
- (Cináed ua Con Minn, consecrated as a bishop, but not abbot of Lismore, also bishop at Inis Cathaig, d. 958).
- Máenach mac Cormaic, d. 959.
- Cathmug, also consecrated as a bishop at Cork, d. 961.
- Cináed mac Máel Chiaráin, d. 965.
- Cormac mac Máol Chiarain, d. 983.
- Ua Máel Sluaig, d. 1024.
- Muiredach Ua Rebacháin, d. 1041.
- Cináed mac Aichir, d. 1063.
- Máel Dúin Ua Rebacháin, d. 1090.
- (Gilla Mo Chutu Ua Rebacháin, consecrated as a bishop, but not abbot of Lismore, d. 1129).

== Notes ==
- ^{A} Only mentioned in the Annals of Inisfallen and Cáin Adomnáin, and probably an error for Conodor of Fore (d. 3 November 707)].

== Bibliography ==
- Fryde, E. B.; Greenway, D. E.; Porter, S.; Roy, I., eds. (1986). Handbook of British Chronology (3rd, reprinted 2003 ed.). Cambridge: Cambridge University Press. ISBN 0-521-56350-X.
- Moody, T. W.; Martin, F. X.; Byrne, F. J., eds. (1984). Maps, Genealogies, Lists: A Companion to Irish History, Part II. New History of Ireland. Vol. XI. Oxford: Oxford University Press. ISBN 0-19-821745-5.
