= Abbot of Emly =

The Abbot of Emly (Irish: Imleach Iubhair; Latin: Imilicensis) was the head of the monastery in Emly, which is in modern-day County Tipperary, Ireland.

The monastery was founded by Saint Ailbe in the early 6th century. After the death of Saint Ailbe, the abbots bore the title "Comarbai Ailbi" (i.e. "successor of Saint Ailbe "). A few of the abbots and others at the monastery were consecrated as bishops. Abbot Diarmait Ua Flainn Chua probably became the first diocesan bishop of Emly when the diocese of Emly was established at the Synod of Ráth Breasail in 1111.

== List of abbots ==
The following is a list of abbots and monastic bishops. (Those who were consecrated as bishops, but did not hold the office of abbot are indicated in italics and brackets):

- Saint Ailbe, d. 527/28, 534, or 542, and his feast day is celebrated on 12 September.
- Names and dates of the abbots from the first half of the 6th century to the mid 7th century are unknown.
- Conaing ua Daint, d. 661.
- Cuán, d. 686.
- Díbléne Elnai, fl. 696/97.
- Conamail mac Carthaig, d. 708.
- Cellach, d. 720.
- Fer dá Chrích, also abbot of Leighlin, d. 742.
- Abnér, d. 760.
- Cennselach mac Con Bairnne, d. 768.
- Senchán, d. 774.^{[A]}
- Senchán, d. 781.^{[A]}
- Senchán, also consecrated as a bishop, d. 11 December 785.^{[A]}
- Cuán, d. 787.
- Rechtabrae mac Mugthigirn, of the Éoganacht Airthair Chliach, d. 819.
- Fland mac Faircellaig, also abbot of Lismore and Cork, d. 21 December 825.
- Ólchobar mac Cináeda, king of Munster, d. 851.
- Fínán, d. 852.
- Máel Tuili, d. 858.
- Maine mac Uargusso, d. 858.
- Cenn Fáelad hua Mugthigirn, king of Munster, d. 872.
- Rudgal (Ruidgel) mac Fingaile, also consecrated as a bishop, d. 882.
- Cú cen Máthair, d. 887.
- Eógan mac Cinn Fáclad, son of King-abbot Cenn Fáelad hua Mugthigirn, d. 890.
- Mescill mac Cummascaig, d. 899.
- Flann mac Conail, d. 904.
- Tipraite mac Máel Finn, also consecrated as a bishop, d. 913.
- Mac Lenna, also abbot of Liath Mór Mo Cháemóc (Leighmore, County Tipperary), d. 935.
- Eochu mac Scannláin, d. 942.
- (Uarach, consecrated as a bishop, but was not abbot of Emly, d. 954).
- Máel Cellaig mac Áeda, d. 957.
- Fáelán mac Cáellaide, also consecrated as a bishop, d. 980.
- Tipraite, deposed 986.
- Cétfaid dalta Riata, d. 989.
- Marcán mac Cennéitig, also abbot of Inis Cealtra, Killaloe and Terryglass, and brother of High-King Brian Boru. Resigned 995, d. 1010.
- Colum ua Laigenáin, became abbot in 995, d. 1002.
- Dub Sláine ua Lorcáin, d. 1004. Probably was first cousin of High-King Brian Boru.
- Sáerbrethach, d. 1025. Probably Sáerbrethach mac Donnchada, father of King Carthach of Eóganacht Chaisil.
- (Máel Finnia, consecrated as a bishop, but was not abbot of Emly, d. 1039).
- Máel Ísu Ua Flainn Chua, resigned 1046, d. 1058.
- Clothna Muimnech, d. 1048.
- Cairpre Ua Lígda, also fer léigind (i.e. Lector), deposed 1052, killed in battle, by which time he seems to have regained the abbacy.
- Muiredach mac Carthaig, king of Eóganacht Chaisil and son of Carthach mac Sáerbrethach, and possibly grandson of Abbot Sáerbrethach of Emly. Seized the abbacy in 1052, possibly deposed, d. 1096.
- Máel Mórda, d. 1074.
- Máel Ísu Ua hÁrrachtáin, d. 1092.
- Diarmait Ua Flainn Chua, also fer léigind (i.e. Lector), and probably the first diocesan bishop of Emly, d. 1114.
- Conchobar Ua Ligda, d. 1122.
- Máel Mórda Ua Clothna, also abbot of Baltinglass and consecrated as a bishop, d. 1164.

== Notes ==
- ^{A} It is not known that there were three successive abbots of same name. Only the first and third appear in the Annals of the Four Masters, while the second is recorded in the Annals of Inisfallen.

== Bibliography ==
- Fryde, E. B.; Greenway, D. E.; Porter, S.; Roy, I., eds. (1986). Handbook of British Chronology (3rd, reprinted 2003 ed.). Cambridge: Cambridge University Press. ISBN 0-521-56350-X.
- Moody, T. W.; Martin, F. X.; Byrne, F. J., eds. (1984). Maps, Genealogies, Lists: A Companion to Irish History, Part II. New History of Ireland. Vol. XI. Oxford: Oxford University Press. ISBN 0-19-821745-5.
