= Móenu =

Móenu, who died 1 March 572, was an Irish bishop.

Maeineann is the first recorded bishop of Clonfert. At times, his successors would also be known as bishops of Uí Maine, the kingdom within which Clonfert was located. The next known bishop was Cumméne Fota, who died in 661, so a number of holders of the office would appear to be unknown.

Maeineann was a nephew of Brendan, and seems to have acted as his Coadjutor and head of the monastic school. It is not known if he was at any time its abbot, or if this was an office exclusive to Brendan.

Catholic Church titles
New creation	Bishops of Clonfert c.563–570	Succeeded by Cummian
