= Abnér =

- Died: 760

Religious life
- Religion: Christianity

Senior posting
- Previous post: Abbot of Imleach Iubhair

Abnér was an Irish Abbot who died 760.

Abnér was abbot of Imleach Iubhair in what is now County Tipperary. In pre-history, it was known as Medón Mairtine, or central Mairtine. The Mairtine was an extremely powerful group in pre-historic Munster.
