= Cumméne Fota =

Irish bishop

Cumméne Fota or Fada, anglicised Cummian (fl. c. 591 – 12 November 661 or 662), was an Irish bishop and fer léignid (lector) of Cluain Ferta Brénainn (Clonfert). He was an important theological writer in the early to mid 7th century.

== Life ==
His Life contains much legendary matter surrounding his birth and other aspects of his life. Cumméne Fota was son to Fiachna, king of West Munster. He early embraced a monastic state, and after some years was made abbot of Keltra, an isle in the lake Dergdarg, upon the river Shannon, sixteen miles from Limerick.

== De controversia paschali ==
He is famous for a Paschal letter (De controversia paschali) which displays his high level of learning. It was written around 632 to Ségéne mac Fiachnaí, abbot of Hy, in an attempt to persuade the monks of that house, whose authority bore great sway in the Pictish and Irish churches, to join with the Roman universal church as to the time of celebrating Easter.

It consists of five manuscript folios, contains quotes from the Vulgate and Vetus Latina Bible; patristic commentary by Augustine, Jerome, Cyprian, Origen, Ambrosiaster and Gregory the Great; extracts from Canon law, ecclesiastical history and synodal decrees from Nicea and Arles in their original, uncontaminated forms, in addition to a decretum that enjoined on the Irish that, if all else failed, they should take their problems to Rome.

Cummian was afterward made bishop of Clonfert. He also owned – among a library of at least forty manuscripts – ten Paschal tracts including one he attributed to "santus Patricius, papa noster" and possibly a letter of Pelagius. He may have written a computational manual, and a commentary on Mark. As Cummianus Longus he may be the author of a penitential, and a hymn on the apostles.

In 1162 his relics, along with those of Bishop Maeineann of Clonfert were translated to removed a protective shrine in Clonfert.

He is said to have been a foster-son of Saint Ita.

== See also ==
- Caolánn
- Cogitosus
- Bricín
- Irish Augustine

Preceded by Maeineann	Abbot of Clonfert ? – 661	Succeeded by Ceannfaeladh of Clonfert
