= Tighe O'DonoghueRoss =

Irish-American painter, engraver, and sculptor (1942–2023)

Tighe O'Donoghue/Ross
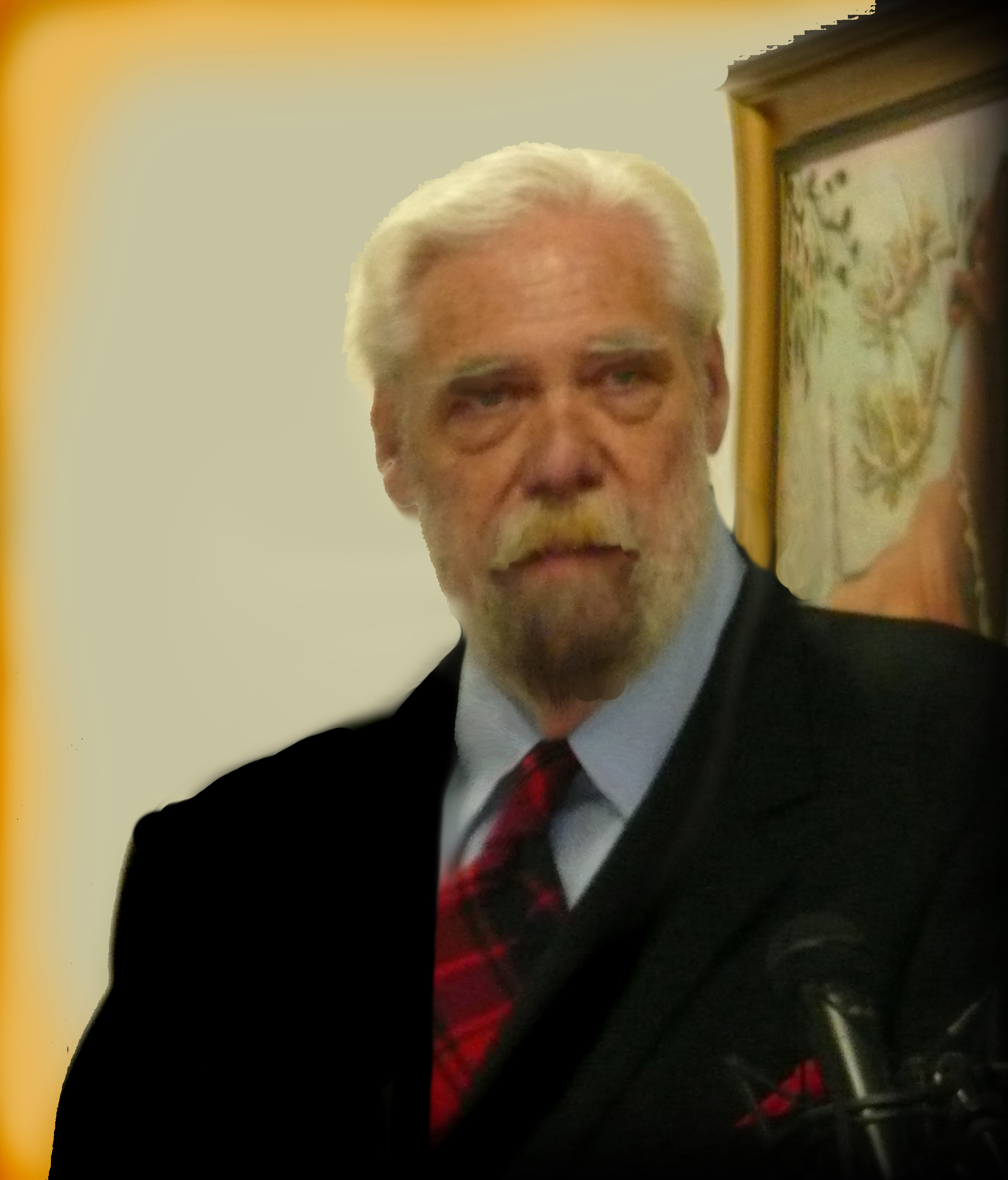
- Tighe O'Donoghue/Ross speaking at the launch of Rod O'Donoghue's book Heroic Landscapes in which his images are included.
- Born: April 15, 1942; New York City, U.S.
- Died: May 30, 2023 (aged 81)
- Style: Neo-Surrealism

Tighe O'Donoghue/Ross (April 15, 1942 – May 30, 2023) was an Irish-American painter, printmaker, and sculptor. He was the recognised hereditary chieftain of the Rapparee Sept the O'Donoghues of Ross.

He was better known as the artist and sculptor who created An Capall Mór, part of 'The Sculpture Road to Killarney' along the N22 traveling to Killarney from Cork, the stained glass windows in St Mary's Cathedral, Killarney, entitled "Dawn & Dusk", dedicated to his ancestors, and the large bronze of St Brendan on a seamount overlooking Fenit Harbour, Brendan's birthplace.

He was also known as Ross, Thomas O'Donohue, O'Donohue Ros, Ros.

O'DonoghuesRoss died on May 30, 2023, at the age of 81.

== Early life ==
Born Thomas Martin O'Donohue in Brooklyn, New York in 1942, he was fascinated with drawing from a very young age and pursued his talent by obtaining an Associate Arts degree from State University of New York at Farmingdale.

After working briefly in commercial art, he entered the United States Air Force, where he was appointed Flight Commander and then spent a tour in Libya, where he was assigned the duties of a Combat Artist during the French-Algerian War. After leaving the USAF, he worked for a time at the Doubleday & Co. publishing house, being promoted to Managing Editor of Dolphin Books. He continued his pursuit of art and also illustrated several books during this period, including creating original sepia etchings for John Gardner's Nickel Mountain, the cover of which was included in the 1975 jury exhibition at The American Institute of Graphic Arts, "Cover '75/Catch the Eye".

== Education and teaching career ==
O'Donoghue continued his study at university, earning a BFA and MFA, graduating magna cum laude from Lehman College of City University of New York in 1970. He taught at the Brooklyn Museum School of Art for a few years and was then offered the opportunity to teach at his alma mater, but he decided against it and moved instead with his wife and young son to a wilderness cabin in upstate New York in the late 1970s.

== Early career ==
O'Donoghue/Ross became well known as a printmaker during the 1970s boom years of the art market in the US, selling editions through various print publishers. His paintings and sculpture were also represented at Vorpal Galleries (Soho and San Francisco). He represented Ireland in the Biennale Internationaile de Gravure at the Moderna Galerija Ljubljana. He moved farther north to the coast of Maine in the early 1980s. In 1986 he traveled with his family to Ireland.

== Work ==
O'Donoghue/Ross has explored nearly every medium of visual expression. He has also experimented in various styles, from veristic (his St Brendan sculpture) to abstract (his Cathedral windows) though he has always returned to his own brand of neo-surrealism. As explained in a lengthy full-page set of articles about his "Mists of Time" exhibition that traveled the country under the auspices of the Siamsa Tíre Theatre and Arts Centre in County Kerry in 1995, he "pursues his own vision, on his own terms, moving from painting to sculpting to printmaking, from realistic to abstract to allegory, working in whatever style fulfilled his need to express the idea or emotion he wished to portray".

In his artist's statement for The Gathering 2013 catalog, he explained "My motivation is hard to define except to say that by making things I keep myself from being bored. That is the same reason that I constantly change focus, from sculpture in all forms to etchings, stained glass to painting, drawing and anything and everything in between."

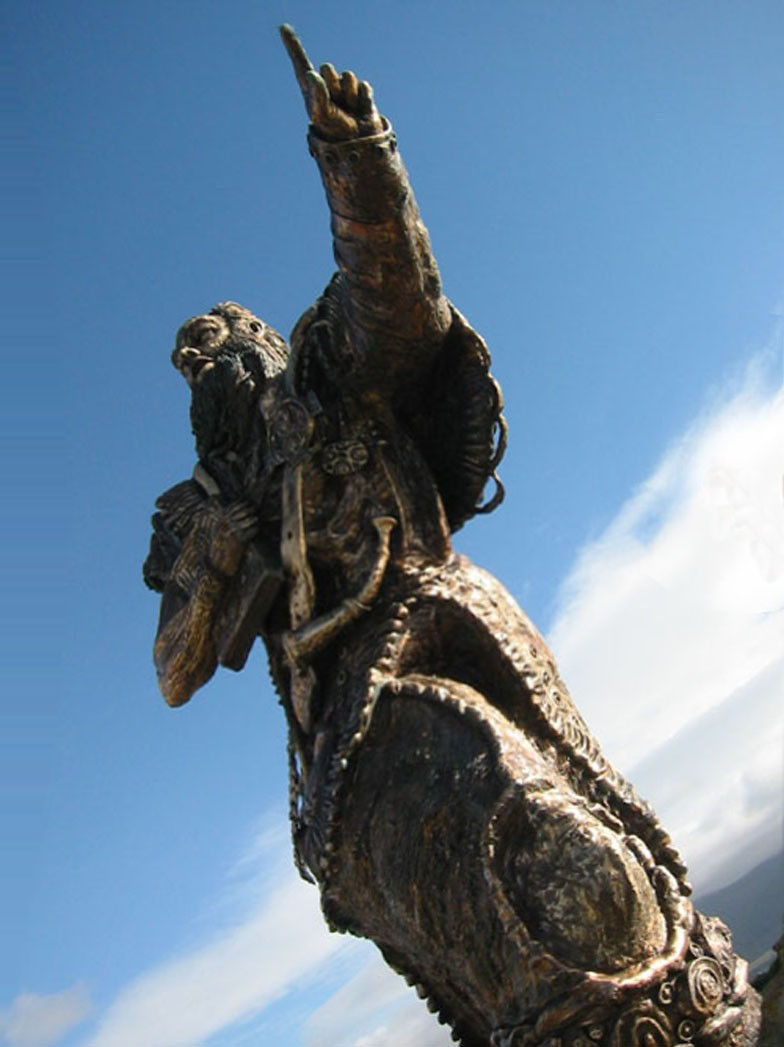
View of the monumental bronze sculpture, St Brendan the Navigator, created by Tighe O'Donoghue/Ross for the St Brendan Heritage Park atop Samphire Island at Fenit, County Kerry, Ireland

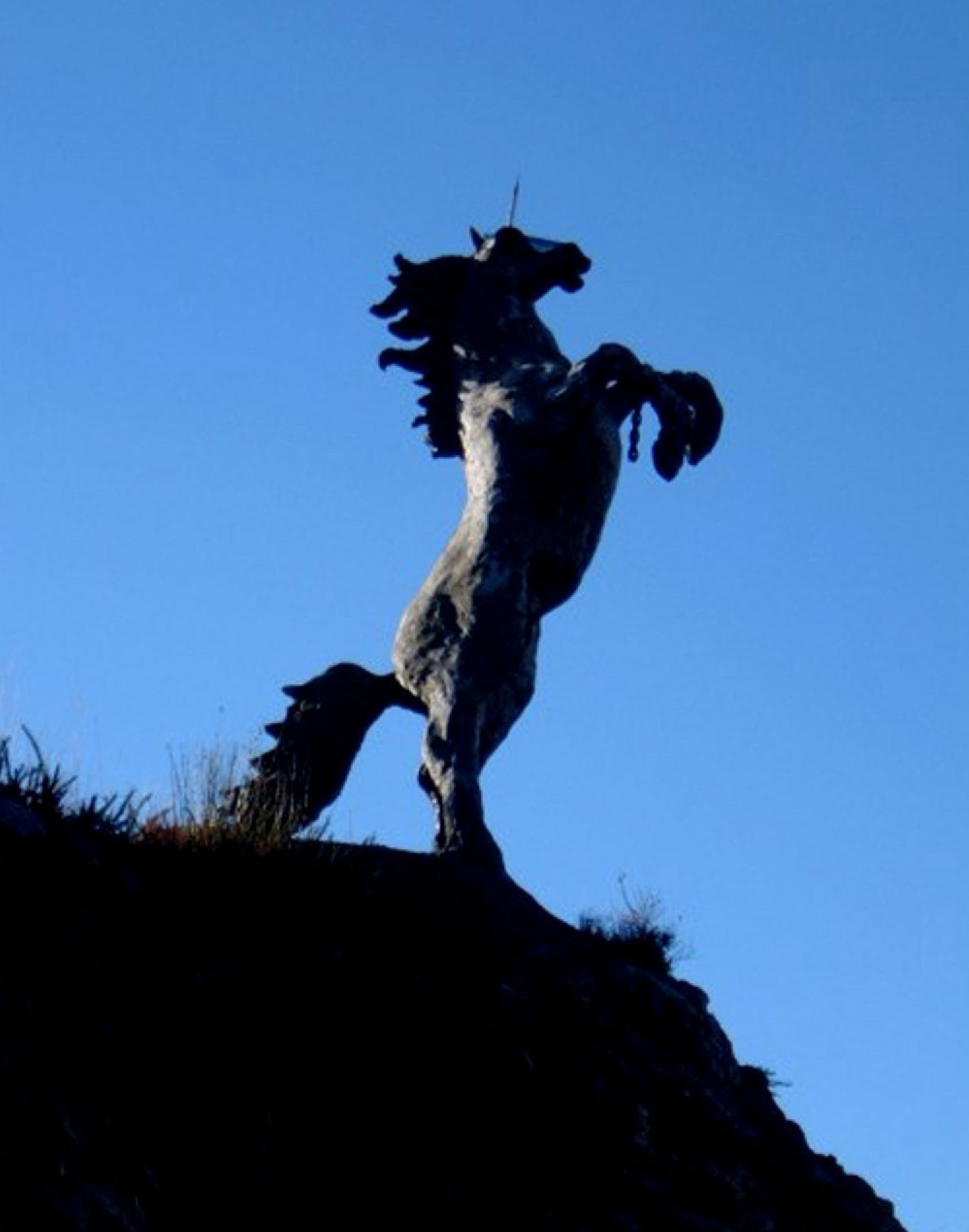
A monumental sculpture by Tighe O'Donoghue/Ross created in patinated ferro-cement of a war horse with helmet and broken chains atop an outcrop along the N22 roadway near Killarney, County Kerry, Ireland

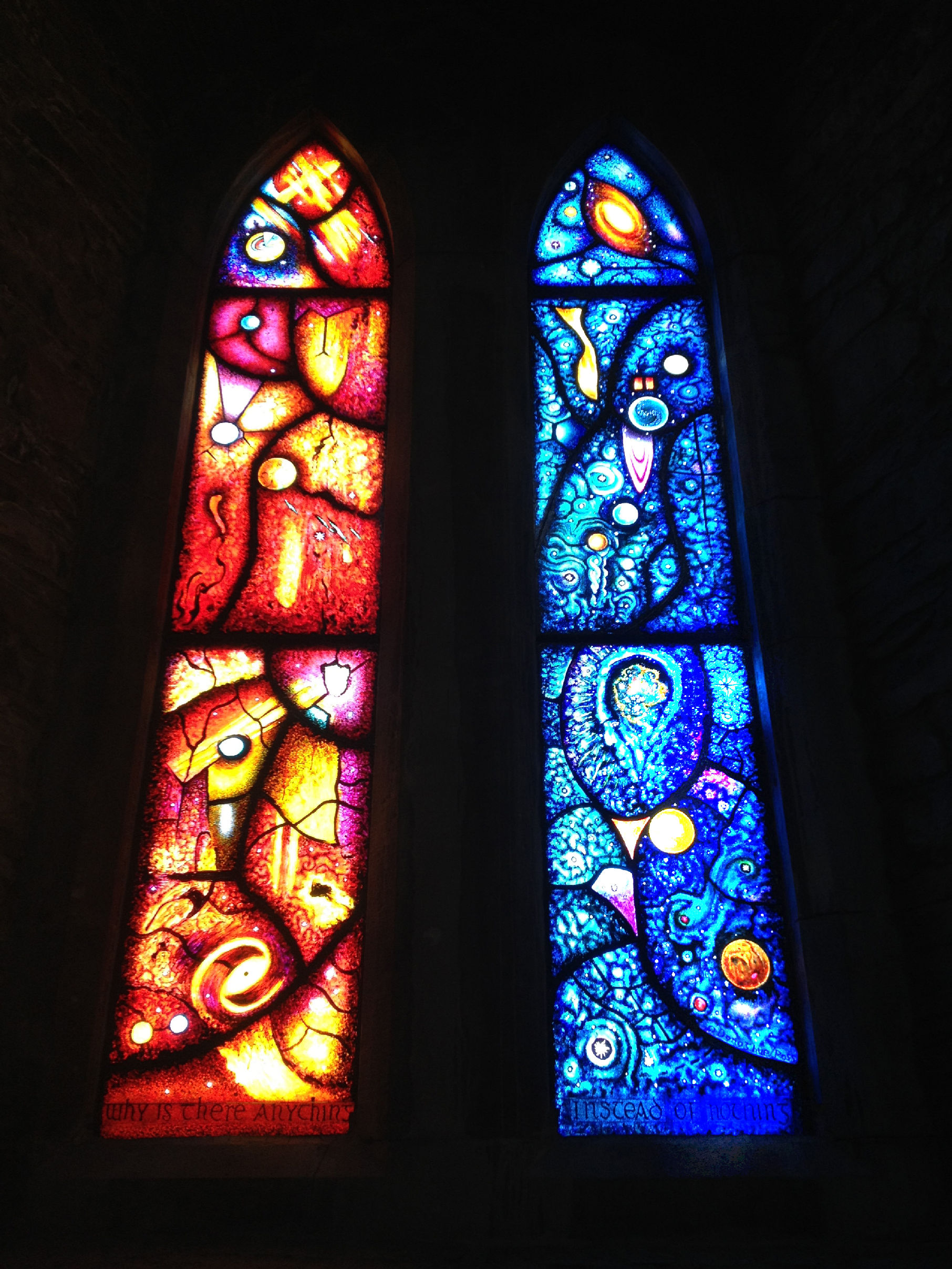
A pair of stained glass windows created by Tighe O'Donoghue/Ross installed at St Mary's Cathedral, Killarney, entitled Dawn & Dusk, commemorating his family and his Rapparee ancestors.

=== Prints ===
O'Donoghue/Ross' graphic work was mainly produced on multiple copper plates for each image, using etching, engraving, aquatint, mezzotint, drypoint and occasionally monoprints.

"He is reminiscent of de Chirico in his bold clarity of manner. But these coloured prints are more intimate, and disconcertingly confident, than de Chirico’s echoing streets."

"...his mezzotints and etchings are conceptually neat, solidly crafted images which wear their substantial concerns lightly.", said Aiden Dunne.

=== Sculpture ===
O'Donoghue/Ross began working in three dimension by modelling in the lost wax process, then moved to direct carving in stone and wood. He began stone carving with a pink granite stone he pulled from the ditch of his property in County Kerry and expanded from there. He has used both conventional and unconventional mediums to fashion his pieces, sometimes using unlikely found objects to create amalgamations of various combinations.

O'Donoghue/Ross' sculpture Capall Mór, part of "The Sculpture Road to Killarney" inspired the book By the Way, a Selection of Public Art in Ireland by Ann Lane. "The 'Capall Mor' is the piece that got me hooked in the beginning," she said. "I thought it was absolutely magnificent and I wanted to see more.". Locals have dubbed O'Donoghue/Ross' collection of roadside sculptures as "The Eighth Wonder of the World."

A bronze of St Brendan the Navigator was commissioned and funded by the Brendan Project in Fenit, County Kerry. It was officially dedicated by Bishop Murphy in September 2004, with the crowd standing against force 9 winds, much as the sculpture depicts the Saint.

=== Paintings ===
O'Donoghue/Ross favours oil painting for the depth and richness of colour. His work is inspired by the Old Masters and glazing as well as the scumbling technique which results in a wonderful subtlety of surface.

"He sees paintings as capable of very deep communication...starting a process...creating images that the artist himself is not conscious of. His paintings can evoke some deeper realization of what we have in common."

=== Stained glass ===
O’Donoghue/Ross was introduced to stained glass when commissioned to create windows for St Joseph’s Church in Fenit, County Kerry. Since then, he has received private commissions. Among his works are a pair of windows in St Mary’s Cathedral in Killarney, titled Dawn and Dusk, which include the inscriptions “Why is there Anything” and “Instead of Nothing” at the bottom of the panels.

The brochure produced by the Diocese of Kerry suggests 'The painted stained glass windows are a gateway, a portal into the light, a way of entering into a mood of meditation. They seek to invoke a feeling of mystery, or present an enigma and a profound experience of light and shade and colour.'

== Collections ==
O'Donoghue/Ross is represented in public and private collections around the world. Some of them include the Bibliotheque Nationale de France; the Brooklyn Museum; Dublin City Gallery The Hugh Lane; Kerry County Council; Utah Museum of Fine Arts; Smithsonian American Art Museum; and the Victoria and Albert Museum.

== Why Is There Anything Instead Of Nothing ==
A feature-length documentary film – Why Is There Anything Instead Of Nothing – about O’Donoghue/Ross and his family was produced by Patrick O’Shea and Southernman Films, completed in May 2017. Starline Entertainment originally contracted for worldwide distribution rights to the film in July that year. Shortly after signing, Variety, reported on Starline's representation. The following month, The Times of London featured an article about the film. Southernman Films now makes it publicly available at Why is there anything instead of nothing - Arts Feature Doc Full Film

== Reviews ==
"The subtleties and oddities of O'Donohue's combination of disparate elements bear considerable study. His art is rewarding, as all good art is, in accord with what the viewer brings to it."

"O'Donoghue has made his mark on the world of Irish art...presented with the panache of a skilled technician."

"All Tighe's paintings have a powerful symbolism, a meaning far beyond the themes that inspire them. When he depicts figures they are mythological, creations of his own psychological landscape...

ARTS Magazine described Tighe O'Donoghue/Ross as a visionary artist in the tradition of William Blake and the American artist, Albert Pinkham Ryder, but the wellspring of Tighe's creativity is unique..."The term 'visionary' is entirely accurate in so far as Tighe creates fantastic worlds of his own which reflect not what is but what might be, behind the veil of the reality that we normally experience."

"O'Donohue unabashedly likes being tied to a narrative; having a "thread to hold onto" is a spur to his creativity.
