= 620 =

620 in various calendars
- Gregorian calendar: 620; DCXX
- Ab urbe condita: 1373
- Armenian calendar: 69; ԹՎ ԿԹ
- Assyrian calendar: 5370
- Balinese saka calendar: 541–542
- Bengali calendar: 26–27
- Berber calendar: 1570
- Buddhist calendar: 1164
- Burmese calendar: −18
- Byzantine calendar: 6128–6129
- Chinese calendar: 己卯年 (Earth Rabbit); 3317 or 3110 — to — 庚辰年 (Metal Dragon); 3318 or 3111
- Coptic calendar: 336–337
- Discordian calendar: 1786
- Ethiopian calendar: 612–613
- Hebrew calendar: 4380–4381
- Hindu calendars
- Vikram Samvat: 676–677
- Shaka Samvat: 541–542
- Kali Yuga: 3720–3721
- Holocene calendar: 10620
- Iranian calendar: 2 BP – 1 BP
- Islamic calendar: 2 BH – 1 BH
- Japanese calendar: N/A
- Javanese calendar: 510–511
- Julian calendar: 620; DCXX
- Korean calendar: 2953
- Minguo calendar: 1292 before ROC 民前1292年
- Nanakshahi calendar: −848
- Seleucid era: 931/932 AG
- Thai solar calendar: 1162–1163
- Tibetan calendar: ས་མོ་ཡོས་ལོ་ (female Earth-Hare); 746 or 365 or −407 — to — ལྕགས་ཕོ་འབྲུག་ལོ་ (male Iron-Dragon); 747 or 366 or −406

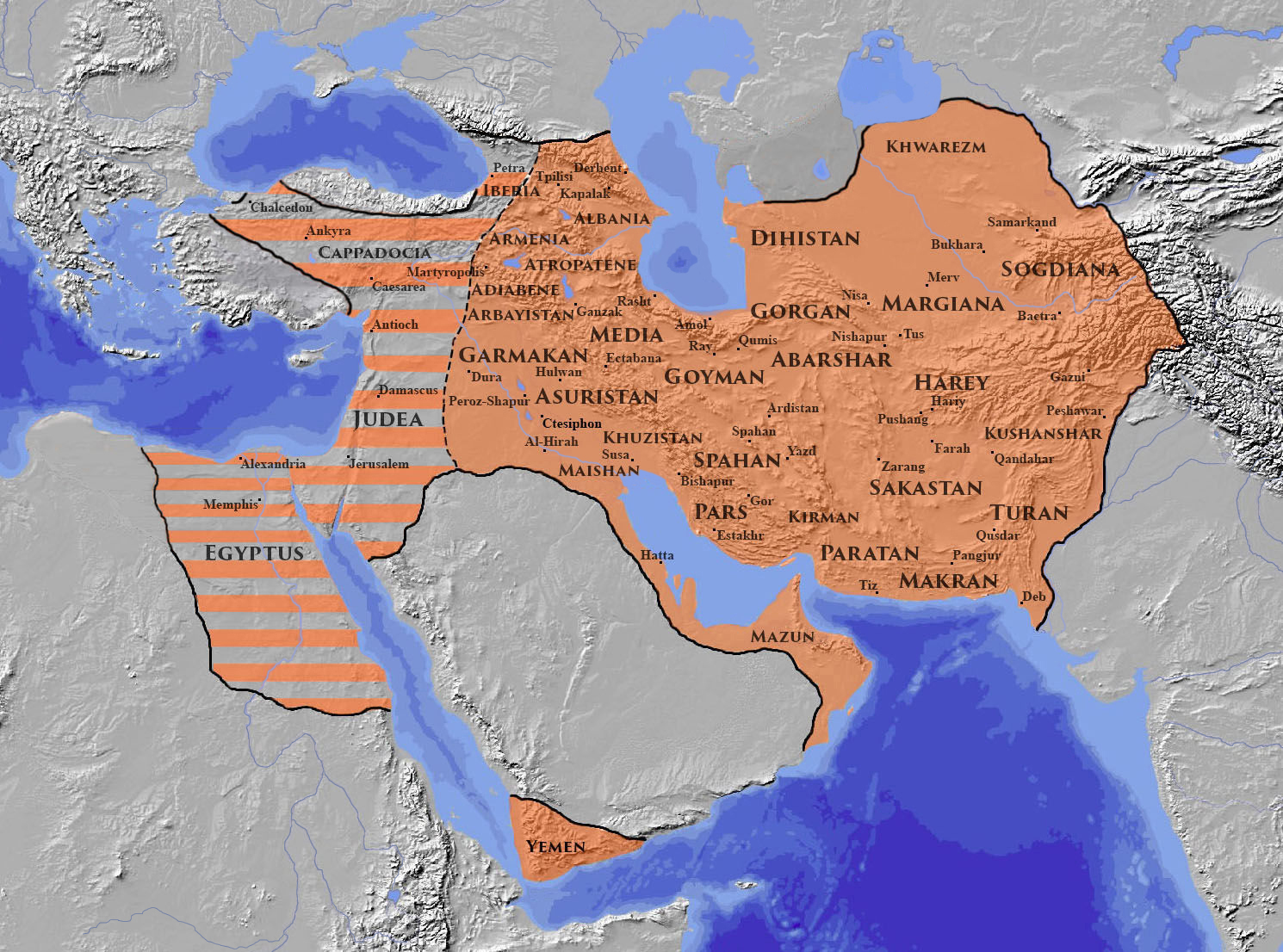
The Sasanian Empire ca. 620

Year 620 (DCXX) was a leap year starting on Tuesday of the Julian calendar. The designation 620 for this year has been used since the early medieval period, when the Anno Domini calendar era became the prevalent method in Europe for naming years.

== Events ==
=== By place ===
==== Byzantine Empire ====
- Byzantine–Sassanid War: King Khosrau II captures Ancyra, an important Byzantine military base in central Anatolia. After the conquest of Egypt and Palestine, he restores the Persian Empire as it existed in 490 BC under Darius I.
- The Slavs invade the area around Thessaloniki, which is unsuccessfully besieged. The city becomes a Byzantine enclave surrounded by Slavic territory. Urban life disappears and many towns in the Balkan Peninsula become villages.

==== Britain ====
- The Angles under King Edwin of Northumbria invade Rheged ("Old North") in Northern England, and expel King Llywarch Hen. He flees to Powys, and becomes a famous bard. Edwin's armies fight against Gododdin and Strathclyde.

==== Asia ====
- King Pulakeshin II defeats the Harsha army on the banks of the Narmada River. Harsha loses a major part of his elephant force and retreats. A truce establishes Narmada as the northern boundary of the Chalukya Kingdom (India).

==== America ====
- The town of Cholula is founded in central Mexico (later said to be the oldest continuously occupied town in all of North America).

=== By topic ===
==== Religion ====
- Weltenburg Abbey in Bavaria (Germany) is founded by Benedictine monks.
- Isra and Mi'raj (Muhammad's ascension to heaven to meet Allah).

== Births ==
- Li Tai, prince of the Tang dynasty (d. 652)
- Cedd, bishop of London (approximate date)

== Deaths ==
- Chuluo Khan, ruler of the Eastern Turkic Khaganate
- Eleutherius, Byzantine exarch of Ravenna
- Shen Faxing, official of the Sui dynasty

approximate date:

- Basolus, Frankish missionary
- Imerius of Immertal, Swiss monk
- John the Merciful, Patriarch of Alexandria
- Mirin, Irish monk and missionary
- Seanach Garbh, Irish abbot
