= Connagan =

Connagan (died 849) was Abbot and Bishop of Clonfert, Ireland.

Preceded by Rechtabhra	Abbot of Clonfert; 848–849	Succeeded by Cormac mac Ciaran
