= Abbot of Cork =

The Abbot of Cork was the head of the monastery at Cork in the province of Munster, Ireland. The monastery was founded by Saint Finbarr in the early seventh century. The abbots also bore the title "Comarbai Báirri", "successor of Saint Finbarr".

== List of abbots ==
The following is a list of abbots and early monastic bishops. (Those who were consecrated bishops, but did not hold the office of coarb or abbot are indicated in italics and brackets):

- Finbarr (Báirri; Barr; Fionnbharr; Lochan), died 25 September 620, 623 or 633.
- Suibne mac Máele Umai, d. 682.
- Rosséne, d. 686 or 687.
- Mend Maiche mac Duib dá Bárcc, fl. 690.
- From the late 7th to the mid 8th century, the names and dates of the abbots (and bishops) are not known.
- Dónait mac To Ence, died 8 May 764.
- Selbach mac Con Alltai, d. 772/74.
- T'Éróc, d. 792.
- Condmach mac Dónait, d. 800.
- Conaing mac Dónait, d. 816 or 817.
- Forbassach, d. 823.
- Fland mac Fairchellaig, also abbot of Lismore and Emly, died 21 December 825.
- Dúnlaing mac Cathassaig, deposed 834 and died 836.
- Feidlimid mac Cremthanin, also king of Munster, abbot of Clonfert, scribe and anchorite, died 28 August 847.
- Colum mac Airechtaig, d. 851.
- Daniél ua Liathaidi, also abbot of Lismore, d. 863.
- Rechtabrae mac Murchado, d. 868.
- (Domnall, consecrated as a bishop, but was not abbot of Cork, also scribe, d. 877).
- (Sóerbrethach mac Connaid, consecrated as a bishop, but was not abbot of Cork, d. 896).
- Arggatán mac Forindáin, possibly resigned 897; died 899.
- Ailill mac Eógain, styled princeps Triuin Corcaige "abbot of Trian Corcaige" (i.e. of the Third of Cork), d. 908.
- Flann mac Loige, d. 913.
- Finnechta, d. 928.
- Ailill mac Cuirc, d. 951.
- (Cathmug, consecrated as a bishop, but was not abbot of Cork, also abbot of Lismore, d. 961).
- (Fínnechta, consecrated as a bishop, but was not abbot of Cork, d. 978).
- Colum mac Ciarucáin, d. 989.
- Flaithern, d. 1001.
- Cellech ua Menngoráin, d. 1007.
- Cormac mac Dúnlaing, d. 1016.
- Cellach ua Selbaig, consecrated as a bishop, resigned 1025 and died 1036.
- Niall ua Meic Duib, d. 1026.
- Art ua hAirt, d. 1027.
- Cathal Martír, d. 1034.
- Óengus mac Catháin, also bishop, d. 1036.
- Dub dá Leithe Ua Cináeda, d. 1057.
- Murgrón Ua Mutáin, also bishop and fer léigind (i.e. Lector), d. 1057.
- Cléirech Ua Selbaig, d. 1085.
- (Ua Cochláin, consecrated as a bishop, but was not abbot of Cork, d. 1096).
- Mac Bethad Ua hÁilgenáin, d. 1106.
- Gilla Pátraic Ua Selbaig, d. 1109.
- Gilla Pátraic Ua hÉnna, death date unknown.
- Domnall Ua Selbaig, d. 1140.
- Finn mac meic Céilechair Ua Cennéitig, also abbot of Terryglass, d. 1152.
- Gilla Pátraic mac Donnchada Mac Carthaig (son of Donnchad Mac Carthaig, King of Desmond), d. 1157.

== See also ==
- Bishop of Cork
