= Rechtabhra =

Irish cleric (died 848)

Rechtabhra (died 848) was Abbot and Bishop of Clonfert.

Preceded by Ruthmael	Abbot of Clonfert; 824–848	Succeeded by Connagan
