= Litan =

Litan (died 900) was abbot of Tuam.

Litan was the fifth known abbot of Tuam, County Galway, but nothing else appears to be known of him. He was the apparent successor of Cormac mac Ciaran but because the sabbatical succession of Tuam is fragmentary, this is uncertain. The next person listed in connection with the monastery at Tuam would be in 947 but titled airchinneach (Erenagh), and so was probably not its abbot.

Events which occurred during his lifetime included:

- 879 - Death of Conchobhar mac Tadhg Mor, King of the three divisions of Connaught.
- 881 - King Ainbhith of Ulaid killed by the Conaille Muirtheimne.
- 888 - Death of Cerball mac Dúnlainge, King of Osraige.
- 893 - Battle of Benfleet; A shower of blood was rained in Ard Cianachta.
- 897 - The expulsion of the foreigners from Ireland, from the fortress of Ath Cliath.
- 899 - Death of Alfred the Great of Wessex, succeeded by his son, Edward the Elder.
- 900 - Diarmaid macCearbhall was driven from Osraighe; Ceallach mac Cearbhall, made king in his place.

Preceded by Cormac mac Ciaran?	Abbot of Tuam ? - 900	Succeeded by ?
