= Brandon Creek =

Village in County Kerry, Ireland

Coordinates: 52.2374°N 10.3111°W

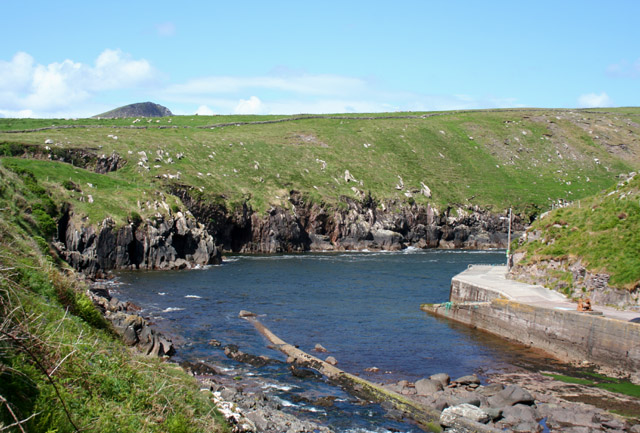
Pier at Brandon Creek

Brandon Creek (Irish: Cuas an Bhodaigh) is a small village located on the Dingle Peninsula, Ireland. The nearest town is Dingle, 13 km to the south via the R549 road.

According to the 9th century document "Voyage of St Brendan the Navigator", Saint Branden set sail westward from this point in the 6th century, and traveled across the Atlantic.

Adventurer Tim Severin took a five-man crew across the Atlantic to prove that St Brendan's voyage would have been possible in the 6th century. The journey departed in May 1976 from Brandon Creek.
