= Tibraide mac Fearchair =

Tibraide mac Fearchair (died 781 or 790) was Abbot of Clonfert.

There is some confusion over the length of Tibraide's term of office, as his death is listed twice in the annals, under 781 and 790. The explanation may be accidental reproduction, or two men of the same name successively holding office.

Preceded by Mac Flaithniadh	Abbot of Clonfert; 778–781/790	Succeeded by Muireadhach mac Olcobhar
