= Fachtna mac Folachtan =

Fachtna mac Folachtan (died 723) was Abbot of Clonfert.

Fachtna mac Folachtan is the third recorded abbot, including Brendan. Neither his immediate predecessors or successors are known with certainty.

Preceded by Seanach Garbh	Abbot of Clonfert ?–723	Succeeded by Fiachna ua Maicniadh
