= Aenghus Ua Flainn =

Aenghus Ua Flainn (died 1036) was Abbot of Clonfert. An apparent kinsman, Coinneccám Ua Flainn, was also abbot and died in 1081.

Preceded by Fiachra Ua Focarta	Abbot of Clonfert; 1006–1036	Succeeded by Ua Corcrain of Clonfert
