= Cellan of Clonfert =

Abbot of Clonfert, Ireland, 8th century

Cellan of Clonfert (died 748) was Abbot of Clonfert.

Preceded by Fiachna ua Maicniadh	Abbot of Clonfert; 747–748	Succeeded by Suibhne of Clonfert
