= Maelpeadair ua Tolaid =

Irish abbot, 10th century

Maelpeadair ua Tolaid (died 992) was Abbot of Clonfert.

Preceded by Eoghan Ua Cathain	Abbot of Clonfert; 980–992	Succeeded by Fiachra Ua Focarta
