= Ruthmael =

Irish abbot and bishop

Ruthmael (died 824) was Abbot and Bishop of Clonfert.

Preceded by Olcobhar mac Cummuscach	Abbot of Clonfert; 820–824	Succeeded by Rechtabhra
