= Muireadhach mac Olcobhar =

8th century Irish abbot

Muireadhach mac Olcobhar (died 797) was Abbot of Clonfert.

Preceded by Tibraide mac Fearchair	Abbot of Clonfert; 790–797	Succeeded by Ceannfaeladh of Clonfert
