= Crimhthann mac Reachtghal =

Irish abbot

Crimhthann mac Reachtghal (died 757) was Abbot of Clonfert, Ireland.

He is very uncertainly associated with Crimthann the Warlike, who defeated the Delbhna Nuadat at the battle of Bealach Cro in 756, during the reign of King Aedh Ailghin of Uí Maine, died 767.

Preceded by Suibhne of Clonfert	Abbot of Clonfert; 757–761	Succeeded by Cethernach ua Ermono
