= Fiachra Ua Focarta =

Irish abbot (died 1006)

Fiachra Ua Focarta (died 1006) was Abbot of Clonfert.

Preceded by Maelpeadair Ua Tolaid	Abbot of Clonfert; 992–1006	Succeeded by Aenghus Ua Flainn
