= Olcobhar mac Cummuscach =

Irish abbot (died 820)

- Died: 820

Olcobhar mac Cummuscach (died 820) was Abbot of Clonfert.

Preceded by Tibraide mac Cethernach	Abbot of Clonfert; 817–820	Succeeded by Ruthmael
