= Suibhne of Clonfert =

Suibhne of Clonfert (died 757) was Abbot of Clonfert.

Preceded by Cellan of Clonfert	Abbot of Clonfert; 748–757	Succeeded by Crimhthann mac Reachtghal
