= Mac Flaithniadh =

Mac Flaithniadh (died 778) was Abbot of Clonfert.

Preceded by Flaithniadh mac Congal	Abbot of Clonfert; 776–778	Succeeded by Tibraide mac Fearchair
