= Eoghan ua Cathain =

Irish abbot, 10th century

Eoghan ua Cathain (died 980) was Abbot of Clonfert.

There is a gap of sixty-six years between recorded abbots, rendering the exact succession between Aedh and Eoghan uncertain.

Preceded by Aedh mac Ailell	Abbot of Clonfert ?–980	Succeeded by Maelpeadair Ua Tolaid
