= Aedh mac Ailell =

Irish abbot of Clonfert

Aedh mac Ailell (died 914) was Abbot of Clonfert.

| Preceded by Cormac mac Ciaran | Abbot of Clonfert; 879?–914 | Succeeded by Eoghan Ua Cathain |
