= Fiachna ua Maicniadh =

Fiachna ua Maicniadh (died 747) was Abbot of Clonfert.

Preceded by Fachtna mac Folachtan	Abbot of Clonfert; 723?–747	Succeeded by Cellan of Clonfert
