= Tibraide mac Cethernach =

Abbot of Clonfert, Ireland

Tibraide mac Cethernach (died 817) was Abbot of Clonfert.

Preceded by Conghaltach mac Etguini	Abbot of Clonfert; 808–817	Succeeded by Olcobhar mac Cummuscach
