= Cethernach ua Ermono =

Cethernach ua Ermono (died 768) was Abbot of Clonfert.

| Preceded by Crimhthann mac Reachtghal | Abbot of Clonfert; 761–768 | Succeeded by Flaithniadh mac Congal |
