= Barvitus =

Saint Barvitus

Barvitus (fl. 545) was a supposed Scottish saint. David E. Thornton suggests that he is a manifestation of the cult of St Finbarr, from north-east Ulster. Barvitus is said to have been the disciple of St Brendan, and his companion in his wanderings.

== Historical records ==
Thomas Dempster in his Historia ecclesiastica gentis Scotarum stated that he wrote the life of his teacher, and flourished about 658, and that the Scotch church kept 5 January sacred to his memory. Other authorities refer to one Barnitus, not Barvitus, as the saint from whose accounts of his own experience Brandan was tempted to go on his search for the Fortunate Isles, but Barnitus and Barvitus were apparently variants of one name.

A Scottish breviary says that Barvitus' body, or relics, were venerated at Dreghorn. The exact connection of the saint with St. Brandan seems uncertain. The only work assigned to Barvitus by Dempster is one entitled 'De Brandani Rebus.' Thomas Tanner suggested that this might be the old manuscript life of St. Brandan preserved in Lincoln College library at Oxford. But Henry Octavius Coxe assigned the handwriting of this manuscript to the eleventh and twelfth centuries.
