= Flaithniadh mac Congal =

Flaithniadh mac Congal (died 776) was Abbot of Clonfert, Ireland.

Preceded by Cethernach ua Ermono	Abbot of Clonfert; 768–776	Succeeded by Mac Flaithniadh
