= Brendan the Navigator =

Irish monastic saint and explorer (circa 484-577)

Saint Brendan the Navigator
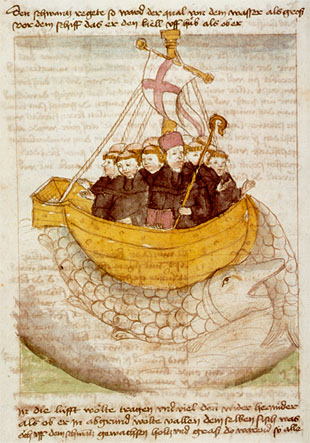
- "Saint Brendan and the Whale" from a 15th-century manuscript

Abbot
- Born: c. AD 484; Ciarraighe Luachra near Tralee, Kingdom of Munster
- Died: c. AD 577; Annaghdown, Kingdom of Connacht
- Venerated in: Catholic Church; Eastern Orthodox Church; Anglican Communion
- Major shrine: Clonfert, Ireland
- Feast: 16 May
- Attributes: Whale; priest celebrating Mass on board a ship while fish gather to listen; one of a group of monks in a small boat
- Patronage: Boatmen; divers; mariners; sailors; travellers; whales; portaging canoes; Diocese of Clonfert; Diocese of Kerry; United States Navy

Brendan of Clonfert (c. AD 484 – c. 577) is one of the early Irish monastic saints and one of the Twelve Apostles of Ireland. He is also referred to as Brendan the Navigator, Brendan the Voyager, Brendan the Anchorite, and Brendan the Bold. The Irish form of his name is Naomh Bréanainn or Naomh Breandán. He is mainly known for his legendary voyage to find the "Isle of the Blessed" which is sometimes referred to as "Saint Brendan’s Island". The written narrative of his journey comes from the immram Navigatio Sancti Brendani Abbatis (Voyage of Saint Brendan the Abbot).

Saint Brendan's feast day is celebrated on 16 May by Catholics, Anglicans, and Orthodox Christians.

== Sources ==
There is very little secure information concerning Brendan's life, although at least the approximate dates of his birth and death, and accounts of some events in his life, are found in Irish annals and genealogies. The earliest mention of Brendan is in the Vita Sancti Columbae (Life of Saint Columba) of Adamnán written between AD 679 and 704. The earliest mention of him as a seafarer appears in the Martyrology of Tallaght of the ninth century.

The principal works regarding Brendan and his legend are a "Life of Brendan" in several Latin (Vita Brendani) and Irish versions (Betha Brenainn) and the better known Navigatio Sancti Brendani Abbatis (Voyage of Saint Brendan the Abbot). Unfortunately, the versions of the Vita and the Navigatio provide little reliable information of his life and travels; they do, however, attest to the development of devotion to him in the centuries after his death. An additional problem is that the precise relationship between the Vita and the Navigatio traditions is uncertain.

The date when the Vita tradition began is uncertain. The earliest surviving copies are no earlier than the end of the twelfth century, but scholars suggest that a version of the Vita was composed before AD 1000. The Navigatio was probably written earlier than the Vita, perhaps in the second half of the eighth century. Aengus the Culdee, in his Litany, composed in the end of the eighth century, invoked "the sixty who accompanied St. Brendan in his quest for the Land of Promise".

Any attempt to reconstruct the facts of the life of Brendan or to understand the nature of his legend must be based principally on Irish annals and genealogies and on the various versions of the Vita Brendani.

== History ==
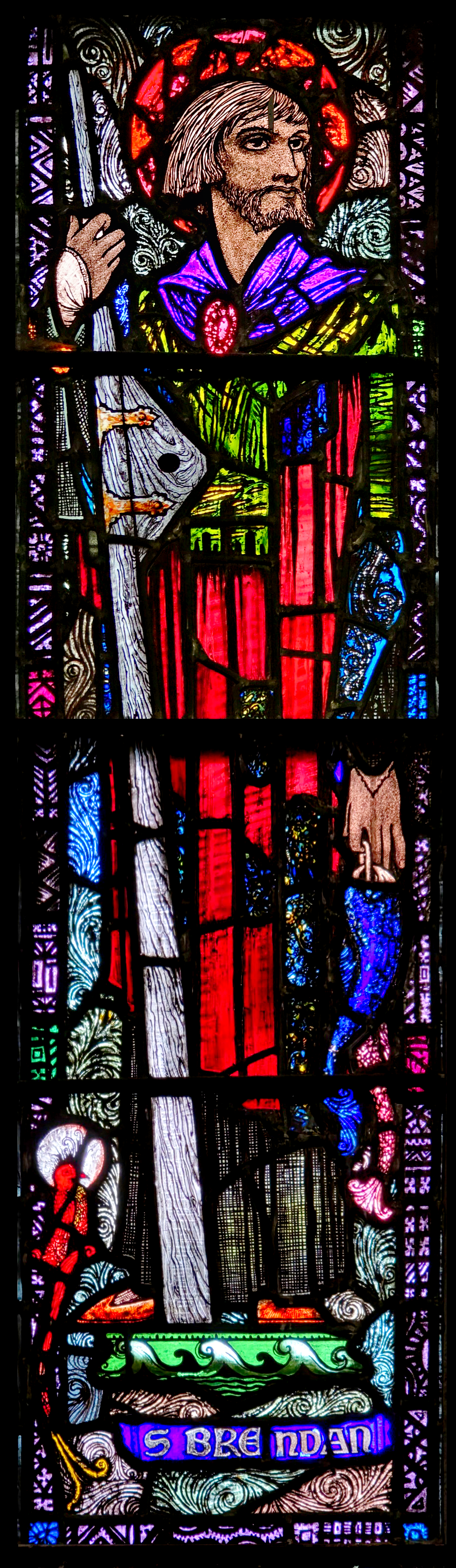
St. Brendan by Harry Clarke

=== Early life ===
Brendan was born in AD 484 in Tralee, in County Kerry, in the province of Munster, in the south-west of Ireland.

He was born among the Altraige, an Irish clan originally centred on Tralee Bay, to parents called Finnlug and Cara. Tradition has it that he was born in the Kilfenora/Fenit area on the north side of the bay. He was baptised at Tubrid, near Ardfert, by Erc of Slane, and was originally to be called Mobhí but signs and portents attending his birth and baptism led to him being christened Broen-finn or 'fair-drop'. For five years he was both educated and given in fosterage to St. Íte of Killeedy, "The Brigid of Munster". When he was six he was sent to Jarlath's monastery school at Tuam to further his education. Brendan is considered one of the "Twelve Apostles of Ireland", one of those said to have been tutored by the great teacher, Finnian of Clonard.

=== Foundations ===
At age 26, Brendan was ordained a priest by Erc. Afterward, he founded a number of monasteries. Brendan's first voyage took him to the Aran Islands, where he founded a monastery. He also visited Hinba (Argyll), an island off the Scottish coast, where he is said to have met Columcille. On the same voyage he travelled to Wales and finally to Brittany, on the northern coast of France.

Between AD 512 and 530, Brendan built monastic cells at Ardfert, and Shanakeel (Seana Cill, usually translated as the "Old Church"), at the foot of Mount Brandon. From there, he is supposed to have embarked on his famous seven-year voyage bound for Paradise. The old Irish calendars assigned a feast for the "egressio familiae Sancti Brendani".

=== Legendary journey ===
Brendan is primarily renowned for his legendary journey to the Isle of the Blessed as described in the Navigatio Sancti Brendani Abbatis (Voyage of Saint Brendan the Abbot) of the ninth century. Many versions exist that narrate how he set out on the Atlantic Ocean with sixteen monks (although other versions record fourteen monks and three unbelievers who joined in the last minute) to search for the Garden of Eden. One of these companions is said to have been Malo. The voyage is dated to AD 512–530, before his travel to the island of Great Britain. On his trip, Brendan is supposed to have seen Saint Brendan's Island, a blessed island covered with vegetation. He also encountered a sea monster, an adventure he shared with his contemporary Columcille. The most commonly illustrated adventure is his landing on an island which turned out to be a giant sea monster named "Jasconius".

==== The Voyage of Saint Brendan the Abbot ====
The earliest extant version of the Navigatio Sancti Brendani Abbatis (Voyage of Saint Brendan the Abbot) was recorded c. AD 900. There are over 100 manuscripts of the narrative throughout Europe and many translations. The Navigatio is plainly a Christian narrative, but also narrates natural phenomena and fantastical events and places, which appealed to a broad audience. The Navigatio contains many parallels and inter-textual references to Bran and The Voyage of Máel Dúin.

On the Kerry coast, Brendan built a currach-like boat of wattle, covered it with hides tanned in oak bark and softened with butter, and set up a mast and a sail. He and a small group of monks fasted for 40 days, and after a prayer on the shore, embarked in the name of the Most Holy Trinity. The narrative is characterized by much literary licence; for example, it refers to Hell where "great demons threw down lumps of fiery slag from an island with rivers of gold fire" and also to "great crystal pillars". Many speculate that these are references to volcanic activity around Iceland and to icebergs.

Synopsis

The journey of Brendan begins when he meets Saint Barinthus. Barinthus describes The Promised Land for Saints (Terra Repromissionis Sanctorum). As Barinthus describes his journey to this island, Brendan decides to visit the island also because it was described as a place of those who lived a certain lifestyle and embraced true faith of Christianity. Brendan assembles a group of fourteen monks who pray together with him in his community to leave with him on his journey. Before departing, Brendan and the monks fast at three-day intervals for forty nights and set out on the voyage that was described to him by Barinthus. They first embark towards the island called Saint Edna. After Brendan and the monks build a small boat for their journey, three people join them after Brendan has already chosen his companions. These three extras will not return to Ireland, as Brendan prophesies, since their number is now an unholy one.

For a period of seven years, the group travel the seas and come across various locations while searching for the Promised Land. One of the first islands they come across is an unnamed and uninhabited island. It is here that the first of the three extra travellers dies. The survivors leave and continue their journey to the Island of Sheep. After a short stay, they land on the back of a giant fish named Jasconius, which they believe to be an island. But once they light a fire, the island starts to move revealing its true nature. Other places they visit include the Island of Birds, the Island of Ailbe inhabited by a community of silent monks, and the Island of Strong Men. In some accounts, it is on the Island of Strong Men where the second of the three additional sailors leaves, remaining on the island instead of continuing. The third of the three is dragged away by demons.

After travelling for seven years, visiting some of the same places repeatedly, the wanderers finally arrive in the Promised Land for Saints. They are welcomed and allowed to enter briefly. Awed by what they see, they return to Ireland rejoicing.

==== Context ====
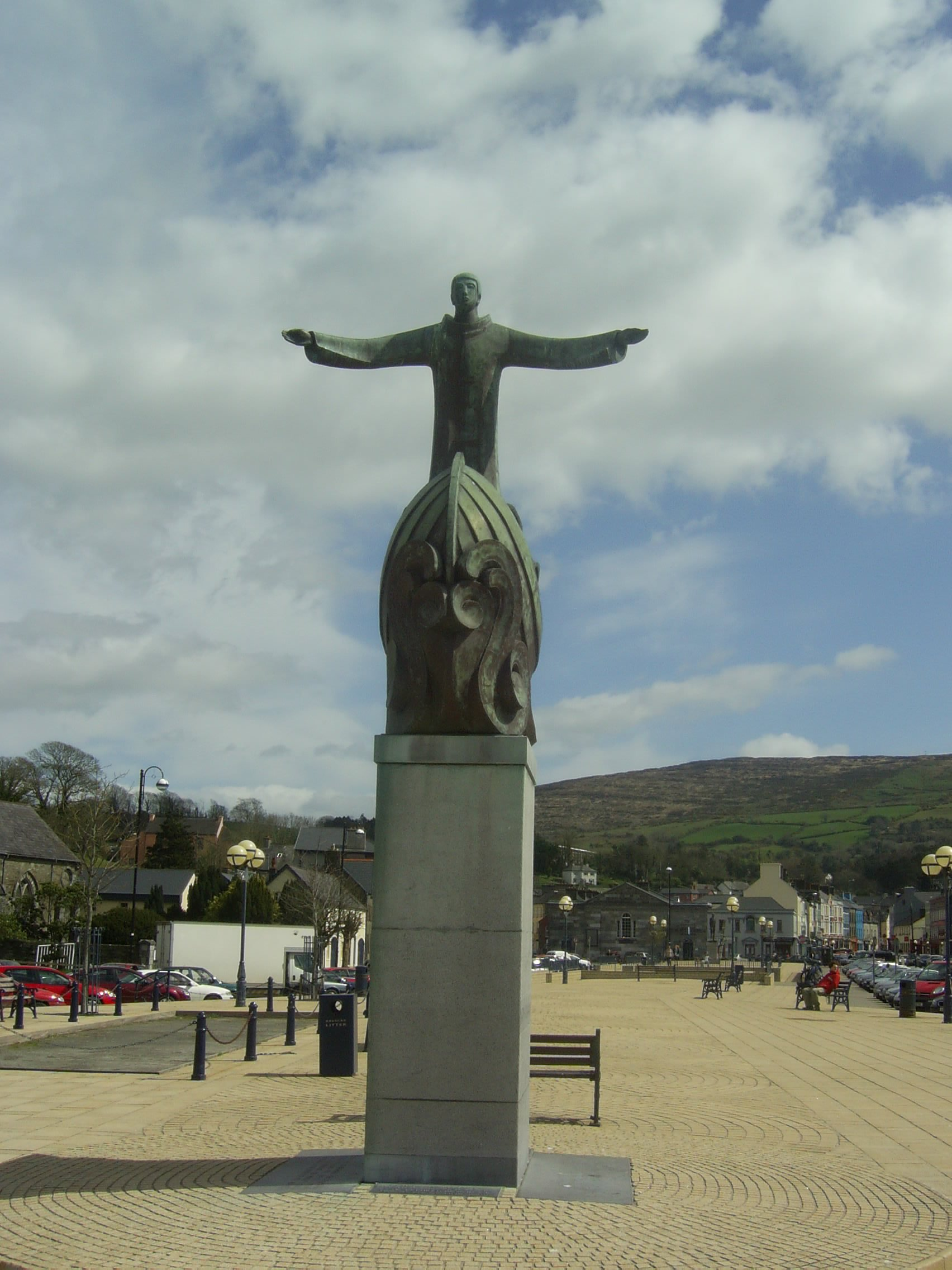
Sculpture of St Brendan, The Square Bantry, County Cork

The Navigatio fits in with a then-popular literary genre, peculiar to Ireland, called an immram. Irish immrama flourished during the seventh and eighth centuries. Typically, an immram is a tale that describes the hero's series of seafaring adventures. Some of the immrams involved the search for, and visits to, Tír na nÓg, an island far to the west, beyond the edges of the world map. There appear to be similarities with The Voyage of Bran written much earlier. In the Navigatio, this style of storytelling accorded with a religious ascetic tradition in which Irish monks travelled alone in boats, in a similar way to that in which their desert brothers isolated themselves in caves.

Brendan's voyages were one of the most remarkable and enduring of European legends. With many of the facts of Brendan's journeys coming from the Navigatio, it has been difficult for scholars to distinguish fact and folklore. The narrative of Brendan's voyage, developed during this time, shares some characteristics with immrams. Like an immram, the Navigatio tells the story of Brendan, who, with some companion monks, sets out to find the terra repromissionis sanctorum, ("Promised Land of the Saints"), that is, the Earthly Paradise.

Jude S. Mackley holds that efforts to identify possible, actual locations referred to in the Navigatio distract from the author's purpose of presenting a legend of "salvation, monastic obedience and the faith required to undertake such a pilgrimage."

==== Intertextuality ====
Scholars debate whether the Navigatio influenced The Voyage of Máel Dúin or vice versa. Jude Mackley suggests that an early Navigatio influenced an equally early Mael Duin and that inter-borrowing continued as the traditions developed. The Navigatio adapts the immram traditions to a Christian context.

A principal similarity between Mael Duin and the Navigatio is the introduction in both of three additional passengers. Mael Dúin is joined by his foster brothers, and Brendan by three additional monks. Both additions upset the equilibrium of the voyages, and only when the additional persons are no longer on board can each voyage be completed.

==== Anglo-Norman version ====
The Anglo-Norman Voyage of Saint Brendan is the earliest surviving narrative text of Anglo-Norman literature. It was probably translated around 1121 by a cleric called Benedeit at the commission of Adeliza of Louvain, the second wife of Henry I of England. In its use of octosyllabic couplets to recount a quest narrative drawn from Celtic sources, it has been described as a precursor of later Old French romances. Benedeit's version of the legend was itself retranslated several times into Latin prose and verse.

==== Early Dutch version ====
One of the earliest extant written versions of Brendan's legend is the Dutch De Reis van Sinte Brandaen (Mediaeval Dutch for The Voyage of Saint Brendan) of the twelfth century. Scholars believe it is derived from a now lost Middle High German text combined with Gaelic elements from Ireland and that it combines Christian and fairy tale elements. De Reis van Sinte Brandaen describes "Brandaen", a monk from Galway, and his voyage around the world for nine years. The journey began as a punishment by an angel who saw that Brandaen did not believe in the truth of a book of the miracles of creation and saw Brandaen throw it into a fire. The angel tells him that truth has been destroyed. On his journeys Brandaen encounters the wonders and horrors of the world, such as Judas Iscariot frozen on one side and burning on the other; people with swine heads, dog legs, and wolf teeth carrying bows and arrows; and an enormous fish that encircles Brandaen's ship by holding its tail in its mouth. The English poem the Life of Saint Brandan is a later derivation from the Dutch version.

==== Saint Brendan's Island ====
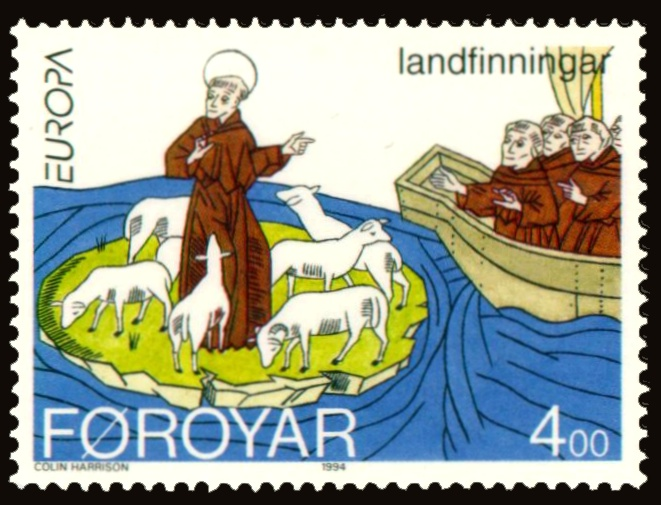
Faroese stamp depicting Saint Brendan, taking up the version that the island he discovered was in the Faroe Islands.

While the narrative is often assumed to be a religious allegory, there has been considerable discussion as to whether the legends are based on fact. There have been many interpretations of the possible geographical location of Saint Brendan's Island. Various pre-Columbian sea charts indicated it everywhere from the southern part of Ireland to the Canary Islands, Faroes, or Azores; to the island of Madeira; to a point 60 degrees west of the first meridian and very near the equator.

==== Tale of reaching North America ====
Belief in the existence of Saint Brendan's Island was almost completely abandoned until a new theory arose that the Irish were the first Europeans to encounter the Americas.

There is no reliable evidence to indicate that Brendan ever reached Greenland or the Americas. The Saint Brendan Society celebrates the belief that Brendan was the first European to reach North America. Tim Severin demonstrated that it is possible for a leather-clad boat such as the one described in the Navigatio to reach North America. Severin's film The Brendan Voyage of 1978, which documented his team's feat, inspired the Irish composer Shaun Davey to write his orchestral suite "The Brendan Voyage".

The Navigatio was known widely in Europe throughout the Middle Ages. Maps of Christopher Columbus' time often included an island denominated Saint Brendan's Isle that was placed in the western Atlantic Ocean.

Paul Chapman argues that Christopher Columbus learned from the Navigatio that the currents and winds would favour westbound travel by a southerly route from the Canary Islands, and eastbound travel by a more northerly route on the return, and hence followed this itinerary on all of his voyages.

=== Later life ===
Brendan travelled to Wales and the holy island of Iona, off the west coast of Scotland; returning to Ireland, he founded a monastery in Annaghdown, where he spent the rest of his life. He also founded a convent at Annaghdown for his sister Briga. Having established the bishopric of Ardfert, Brendan proceeded to Thomond, and founded a monastery at Inis-da-druim (currently Coney Island), in the present parish of Killadysert, County Clare, c. AD 550. He then journeyed to Wales and studied under Gildas at Llancarfan, and thence to Iona, for he is said to have left traces of his apostolic zeal at Kil-brandon (near Oban) and Kil-brennan Sound. After a mission of three years in Britain he returned to Ireland, and evangelized further in various parts of Leinster, especially at Dysart, County Kilkenny, Killeney near Durrow (Tubberboe Irish: Tóbar Bó, meaning 'Well of the cow'), and Brandon Hill. He established churches at Inchiquin, County Galway, and Inishglora, County Mayo, and founded Clonfert in Galway c. AD 557. He died c. AD 577 in Annaghdown, while visiting his sister Briga. Fearing that after his death his devotees might take his remains as relics, Brendan had previously arranged to have his body secretly returned to the monastery he founded in Clonfert, concealed in a luggage cart. He was interred in Clonfert Cathedral.

== Veneration ==
Brendan was recognised as a saint by the Catholic Church. His feast day is celebrated on 16 May. As the legend of the seven years voyage spread, crowds of pilgrims and students flocked to Ardfert. Religious houses were formed at Gallerus, Kilmalchedor, Brandon Hill, and the Blasket Islands, to meet the wants of those who came for spiritual guidance from Brendan. Brendan is the patron saint of sailors and travellers. At the United States Naval Academy in Annapolis, Maryland, a large stained glass window commemorates Brendan's achievements. At Fenit Harbour, Tralee, a substantial bronze sculpture by Tighe O'Donoghue/Ross was erected to honour the memory of Brendan. The project, including a Heritage Park and the Slí Bhreanainn (the Brendan way) was headed by Fr. Gearóid Ó Donnchadha and completed through the work of the St. Brendan Committee.

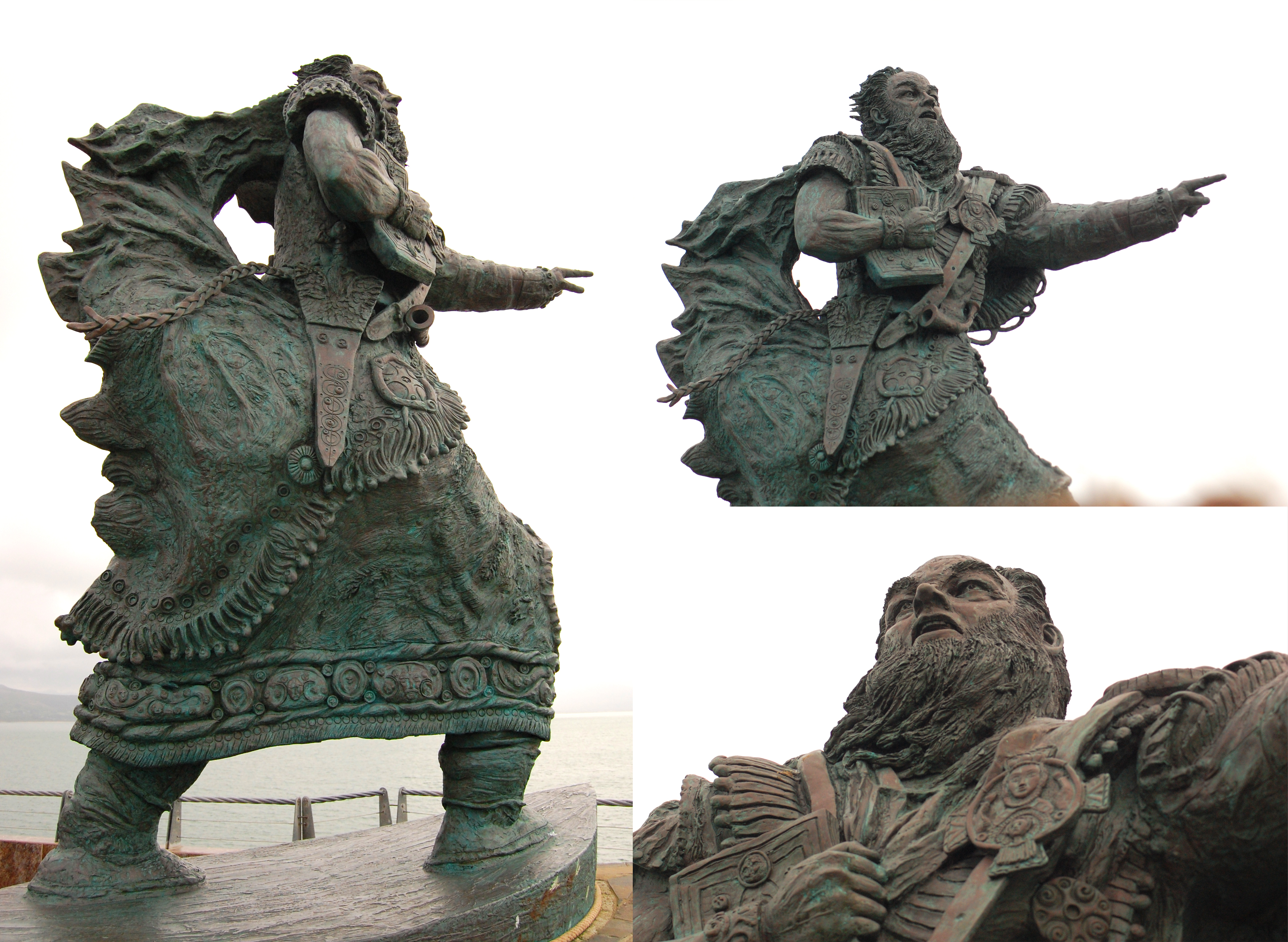
Statue of Brendan at Fenit Harbour

== Patronage ==
Brendan the Navigator (Brénainn moccu Alti or Brénainn maccu Alti as he is often known in medieval Irish) is the patron saint of two Irish dioceses, Kerry and Clonfert. He is also a patron saint of boatmen, mariners, travellers, elderly adventurers, whales, the United States Navy, and also of portaging canoes (carrying canoes overland).

== Establishments ==
St Brendan's activities as a churchman, however, were developed in Western Ireland, where his most important foundations are found, i.e., Ardfert (County Kerry), Inishdadroum (County Clare), Annaghdown (County Galway), and Clonfert (County Galway). His name is perpetuated in numerous place names and landmarks along the Irish coast (e.g., Brandon Hill, Brandon Point, Mount Brendan, Brandon Well, Brandon Bay, Brandon Head).

Brendan's most celebrated foundation was Clonfert Cathedral, in the year 563, over which he appointed Moinenn as Prior and Head Master. Brendan was interred in Clonfert.

The ruins of the ancient Cathedral of St. Brendan, and of its annexed chantries and detached chapels, contained examples of Irish ecclesiastic architecture from the seventh or eighth century to the medieval Gothic period. Following the Reformation, the cathedral was dismantled in A.D. 1641.

== Places associated with St Brendan ==
- Annaghdown, County Galway
- Ardfert, County Kerry
- Brancepeth and church of St Brandon, County Durham
- Brandon Creek on Dingle Peninsula, County Kerry
- Brandon Hill, County Kilkenny
- Bristol, Gloucestershire, England
- Canary Islands
- Clonfert, Ireland
- Dysart, County Kilkenny
- Faroe Islands
- Fenit Island, Tralee Bay, County Kerry
- Gallarus Oratory, County Kerry
- Hebrides
- Iceland
- Inishglora, County Mayo
- Isle of Iona, Scotland
- Killadysert, County Clare
- Killbrandon, near Oban, Scotland
- Kilbrennan Sound
- Killiney
- Inchiquin, County Galway
- Jan Mayen, who some claim was the first person to sight Jan Mayen Island
- Miami, Florida, United States: an elementary (K-8) and high school (9–12) are named in his honor
- Mount Brandon, County Kerry
- Newfoundland
- Nigeria, Iyamoyong, Cross River State: St Brendan Secondary School (a high school) is named in his honor
- Monhegan Island, Maine, United States
- Queensland, Australia: St. Brendan's College, Yeppoon: A Roman Catholic all-boys boarding high school founded by the Christian Brothers is named in his honor
- Samborombón Bay, Buenos Aires Province, Argentina

=== Brontë in Sicily ===
In the Sicilian town of Brontë there is a church dedicated to Saint Brendan, whose name in the local dialect is "San Brandanu". Since 1574, the "Chiesa di San Blandano" ("Church of Saint Brendan") has replaced a chapel of the same dedication and in the same location. The reasons for dedicating a church to Saint Brendan here are still unknown and probably untraceable. However, it is known that the Normans and the many settlers that followed the Norman invasion brought into Sicily the tradition of Saint Brendan; there are documents of the 13th century written in Sicily that refer to him. In 1799, the countryside surrounding Brontë became the British "Duchy of Horatio Nelson". The town of Drogheda, moreover, is twinned with Brontë.

== Appearances in popular culture ==
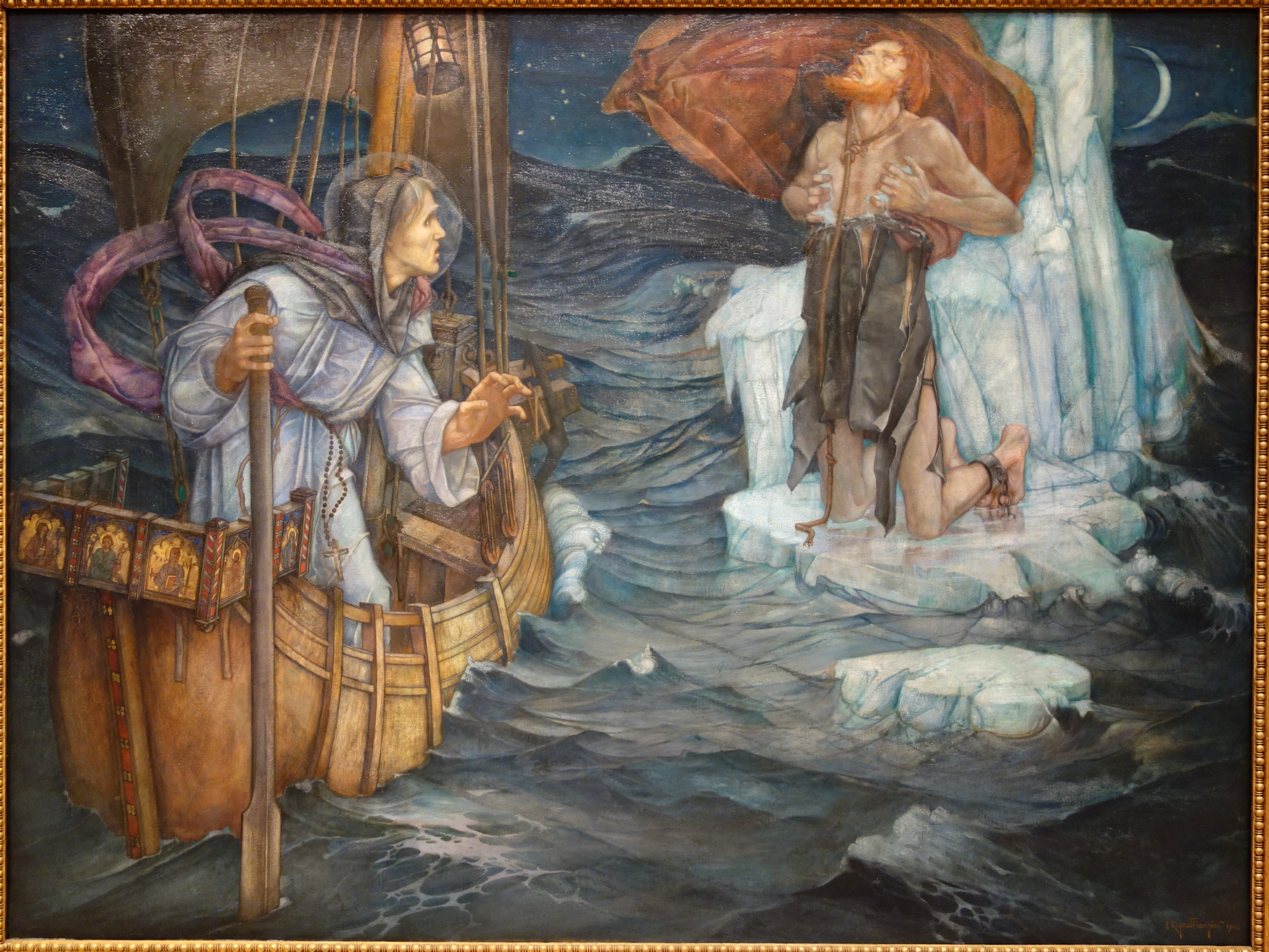
The Voyage of Saint Brendan by Edward Reginald Frampton, 1908

- Belfast poet Pádraic Fiacc wrote the poem LEGEND, where he suggests the great Irish evangelist St Brendan, met peacefully with the American Native Indian peoples – a different proposition to the later colonists who arrived from Europe searching for wealth.
- Australian novelist Patrick Holland re-imagines the Brendan voyage in his 2014 novel Navigatio.
- Scottish poet A.B. Jackson uses the 14th-century Dutch 'Van Sente Brandane' as the basis for his poetry collection The Voyage of St Brendan (Bloodaxe Books, 2021).
- American author and theologian Frederick Buechner retold the life of Brendan the Navigator in his 1987 novel, Brendan. The novel won the Christianity and Literature Book Award for Belles-Lettres in the same year.
- The "Brendan Voyage" is an orchestral suite for Uilleann pipes, written by Irish composer Shaun Davey recorded in 1980, featuring Liam O'Flynn. It is based on Tim Severin's book of the same name.
- The Celtic band Iona made an entire recording inspired by the voyage of Saint Brendan called Beyond These Shores, now available as part of the recording "The River Flows".
- Singer songwriter Sarana VerLin wrote an instrumental song titled "St Brendan's Reel" that appears on several albums including Amadon Crest.
- In the 2005 film Beowulf & Grendel, a travelling monk named Brendan the Celt sails to Denmark circa 521 A.D.
- J. R. R. Tolkien wrote a poem, "The Voyage of Saint Brendan", included in his time-travel story The Notion Club Papers, published posthumously (1992) in Sauron Defeated. He also published a version of the poem, titled "Imram", during his lifetime, in 1955.
- Tommy Makem's song "Brendan" on the album Rolling Home tells the story (explained in detail on the disk sleeve) of how Brendan had travelled to Newfoundland, down the coast to Florida, and thence back home to Ireland.
- Irish rock band The Elders have a song on their album Racing the Tide called "Saint Brendan Had a Boat".
- Saint Brendan has been adopted by the scuba diving industry as the Patron Saint of Scuba Divers.
- Irish folk singer Christy Moore had a humorous track called "St. Brendan's Voyage" on his 1985 album Ordinary Man.
- Canadian indie band The Lowest of the Low correlate the voyage of St Brendan to the Atlantic passage of French and Irish immigrants to eastern Canada in the song "St Brendan's Way" on the album Shakespeare My Butt.
- Ozarks folk singer Jimmy Driftwood wrote a humorous song about the voyage of St Brendan called "St. Brendan's Fair Isle".
- Irish poet James Harpur wrote a sonnet, "Brendan", included in his 2007 collection The Dark Age; it makes mention of Brendan's encounter with Judas.
- Novelist Morgan Llywelyn wrote a fictional version of Brendan's life in her 2010 book, Brendán.
- Novelist Patricia Kennealy-Morrison features a fictional Brendan in her book "The Deers Cry", a story with a science fiction twist. In this book, Brendan is a pagan who decides to leave Earth for another planet because of his dislike for Christianity.
- At the climactic scene of Robert E. Howard's story The Cairn on the Headland, the protagonist uses a hallowed Cross made by Saint Brendan in order to banish the Norse god Odin, who was about to come back to life and destroy modern Dublin.
- Matthew Arnold's poem "Saint Brandan" tells of the meeting with Judas on the iceberg.
- Alison Brown, an American banjo player, guitarist, composer, and producer, has a song called "The Wonderful Sea Voyage (of Holy Saint Brendan) on her "Alison Brown Quartet" CD.
- In Part 2 of John Crowley's 2017 novel Ka: Dar Oakley in the Ruin of Ymr, the crow Dar Oakley escorts a group of brothers and fisherman across the water. One of the brothers is revealed to be Saint Brendan.
- In the 2018 video game Call of Cthulhu, the fictional Darkwater Island features a statue of Saint Brendan in the docks. The fishermen of the island revere the saint, but the statue is defaced and later toppled by the cult on the island.
- In the 2020 video game Assassin's Creed Valhalla, players can solve many puzzles left by Brendan, voiced by Simon Lee Phillips.
- Robert Bruton's 2023 novel Empire in Apocalypse uses Brendan's voyage to Iceland to give witness to the volcanic eruption in 536 AD that led to a global climate catastrophe and ruined the hopes of a Roman Empire Revival in the West.
- In the movie The Secret of Kells, the main character is loosely based on the life and journeys of St. Brendan.

== See also ==
- List of people on the postage stamps of Ireland
- Maeineann of Clonfert
- Maolán
- Pre-Columbian trans-oceanic contact
- Saint Amaro, a semi-legendary Spanish navigator and saint
- Saint Brendan's Island, a phantom island said to have been discovered by St Brendan on his voyage
- Saint Brendan, patron saint archive

== Bibliography ==
=== Secondary sources ===
- Ó Donnchadha, Gearóid. St Brendan of Kerry, the Navigator. His Life & Voyages. Open Air, 2004 ISBN 1-85182-871-0
- Meijer, Reinder. Literature of the Low Countries: A Short History of Dutch Literature in the Netherlands and Belgium. New York: Twayne Publishers, Inc., 1971.

=== Primary sources ===
- Vita Sancti Brendani (Latin):
  - "The Life of St Brendan and His Prayer", trans. Gordon Barthos (Toronto, 2024)
- Navigatio Sancti Brendani Abbatis (Latin):
  - trans. J.F. Webb in The Age of Bede, ed. D. H. Farmer (Harmondsworth, 1983)
  - ed. Carl Selmer, Navigatio Sancti Brendani Abbatis (South Bend, IN, 1959)
  - trans. John O‟Meara and Jonathan Wooding, in The Voyage of Saint Brendan: Representative Versions of the Legend in English Translation, ed. W.R.J. Barron and Glyn S. Burgess (Exeter, 2002).
  - ed. and tr. G. Orlandi – R.E. Guglielmetti, Navigatio sancti Brendani. Alla scoperta dei segreti meravigliosi del mondo (Firenze, 2014).
- The First Irish Life of St Brendan
  - ed. and tr. Whitley Stokes, Lives of Saints from the Book of Lismore. Anecdota Oxoniensia, Mediaeval and Modern Series 5. Oxford, 1890. pp. 99–116, 247–261. Based on the Book of Lismore copy.
  - ed. and tr. Denis O’Donoghue, Brendaniana. St Brendan the Voyager in Story and Legend. Dublin, 1893. Partial edition and translation, based on the Book of Lismore as well as copies in Paris BNF celtique et basque 1 and BL Egerton 91.
- The Second Irish Life of St Brendan (conflated with the Navigatio). Brussels, Bibliothèque Royale de Belgique 4190–4200 (transcript by Mícheál Ó Cléirigh)
  - ed. and tr. Charles Plummer, Bethada náem nÉrenn. Lives of the Irish saints. Oxford: Clarendon, 1922. Vol. 1. pp. 44–95; vol. 2, 44–92.
- Voyage of St Brendan (Anglo-Norman)
  - The Anglo-Norman Voyage of St Brendan, ed. Brian Merrilees and Ian Short (Manchester, 1979)
  - The Anglo-Norman Voyage of St Brendan by Benedeit, ed. E.G. Waters (Oxford, 1928)
  - Benedeit – Le Voyage de Saint Brandan, ed. and transl. into German Ernstpeter Ruhe (München, 1977)
  - Transl. in The Voyage of Saint Brendan: Representative Versions of the Legend in English Translation, ed. W.R.J. Barron and Glyn S. Burgess (Exeter, 2002)

=== Further reading ===
- Bray, Dorothy, "Allegory in the Navigatio Sancti Brendani", Viator 26 (1995), 1–10.
- Burgess, Glyn S, and Clara Strijbosch, The Legend of St Brendan: A Critical Bibliography (Dublin, 2000)
- Dumville, David, "Two Approaches to the Dating of Nauigatio Sancti Brendani", Studi medievali, third s. 29 (1988), 87–102
- Esposito, M., "An Apocryphal Book of Enoch and Elias as a Possible Source for the Navigatio Sancti Brendani", Celtica 5 (1960), 192–206
- Gardiner, Eileen, Visions of Heaven and Hell Before Dante (New York: Italica Press, 1989), pp. 81–127, provides an English translation of the Latin text of the Voyage of St Brendan.
- Iannello, Fausto, Jasconius rivelato. Studio comparativo del simbolismo religioso dell' "isola-balena" nella Navigatio sancti Brendani (Alessandria: Edizioni dell'Orso, 2013)
- Illingworth, Robin N., "The Structure of the Anglo-Norman Voyage of St Brendan by Benedeit," Medium Aevum 55:2 (1986), 217–229
- Jones, Robin F., "The Mechanics of Meaning in the Anglo-Norman Voyage of Saint Brendan," Romanic Review 71:2 (1980), 105–113
- Moult, D. Pochin, "St Brendan: Celtic Vision and Romance,‟ in Ireland of the Saints (London, 1953), pp. 153–70
- Ritchie, R. L. G., "The Date of The Voyage of St Brendan‟, Medium Aevum 19 (1950), 64–66
- Sobecki, Sebastian, "From the désert liquide to the Sea of Romance – Benedeit's Voyage de saint Brandan and the Irish immrama", Neophilologus 87:2 (2003), 193–207
- Sobecki, Sebastian, The Sea and Medieval English Literature (Cambridge: 2008)
- Wooding, Jonathan, "St Brendan's Boat: Dead Hides and the Living Sea in Columban and Related Hagiography‟, in Studies in Irish Hagiography: Saints and Scholars, eds John Carey, Máire Herbert and Pádraig Ó Riain (Dublin, 2001), pp. 77–92
- Wooding, Jonathan, The Otherworld Voyage in Early Irish Literature (Dublin, 2000).
- Wooding, Jonathan, "The medieval and early modern cult of St Brendan," in Boardman, Steve, John Reuben Davies, Eila Williamson (eds), Saints' Cults in the Celtic World (Woodbridge, Boydell Press, 2009) (Studies in Celtic History),
- Murray, K. Sarah-Jane, "The Wave Cry, The Wind Cry," in From Plato to Lancelot (Syracuse University Press, 2008).

Catholic Church titles
New post	Abbot of Clonfert; 563–577	Succeeded by Seanach Garbh
