= Seanach Garbh =

Seanach Garbh (died 620) was Abbot of Clonfert.

Seanach is the second recorded abbot, including Brendan. Few details of his life appear to be known, and over one hundred years would pass before another abbot was recorded. Events during his lifetime included:

- 577 - Battle of Deorham
- 578 - foundation of Kongo Gumi
- 580 - Fearghus Scannal, King of Munster, was slain.
- 582 - Fearadhach, son of Duach, Lord of Osraighe, was slain by his own people.
- 585 - Famine in Gaul
- 597 - Brenainn mac Cairbre dies.
- 605 - Molua, i.e. Lughaidh Mac hUi Oiche, first abbot of Cluain Fearta Molua, died.
- 611 - The church of Beannchair Uladh was burned.
- 612 - The devastation of Torach by a marine fleet.
- 617 - The battle of Ceann Gubha

Preceded by Brendan	Abbot of Clonfert; 577?–620	Succeeded by Fachtna mac Folachtan
