= Cormac mac Ciaran =

Abbot of Tuam, Ireland

Cormac mac Ciaran (died 879) was Abbot of Tuam.

Cormac mac Ciaran is the fourth known abbot of Tuam, since its foundation as a Christian monastery by Jarlath in the 520's, and the first one known by name in over one hundred years.

According to his obituary in the Annals of the Four Masters, he was also Prior of Clonfert.

Events which occurred during his lifetime included:

- 857 – A peace conference held at Rath Aedha Mic Bric, overseen by King Máel Sechnaill mac Máele Ruanaid.
- 859 – The battle of Druim Da Mhaighe; Máel Sechnaill defeats the Vikings of Dublin.
- 862 – Máel Sechnaill mac Máele Ruanaid dies on 27 November.
- 864 – Osraighe slaughters the Vikings, with Cinnedidh mac Gaithin, at Mindroichet.
- 870 – The plundering of the men of the Three Plains, and of the Comanns as far as Sliabh Bladhma by Vikings.
- 874 – Ruaidhri, son of Mormind, King of Britain, came to Ireland, to shun the Dubhghoill.
- 877 – The first year of Flann Sinna, the son of Maelsechlainn, in sovereignty over Ireland.
- 878 – The oratory of Cianan was plundered and destroyed by the foreigners.

Preceded by Feardomhnach?	Abbot of Tuam ?–879	Succeeded by Litan
Preceded by Connagan	Prior of Clonfert; 849?–879	Succeeded by Aedh mac Ailell
