= Ceannfaeladh of Clonfert =

Ceannfaeladh of Clonfert (died 802) was Abbot of Clonfert.

Preceded by Muireadhach mac Olcobhar	Abbot of Clonfert; 797–802	Succeeded by Conghaltach mac Etguini
